= But Not for Me (film) =

1959 film directed by Walter Lang

- Theatrical release poster
- Directed by: Walter Lang
- Written by: John Michael Hayes
- Based on: Accent on Youth by Samson Raphaelson
- Produced by: William Perlberg; George Seaton
- Starring: Clark Gable; Carroll Baker; Lilli Palmer; Lee J. Cobb
- Cinematography: Robert Burks
- Edited by: Alma Macrorie
- Music by: Leith Stevens
- Production company: Perlberg-Seaton Productions
- Distributed by: Paramount Pictures
- Release date: 19 August 1959
- Running time: 104 minutes
- Country: United States
- Language: English
- Box office: $2.5 million (est. US/ Canada rentals)

But Not for Me is a 1959 American comedy film directed by Walter Lang and starring Clark Gable, Carroll Baker and Lilli Palmer. It was distributed by Paramount Pictures. It is based on the 1934 play Accent on Youth written by Samson Raphaelson.

== Plot ==
Russ Ward is a Broadway producer with a 30-year record of success who has been out of town. On returning to New York, everybody wants a piece of him: ex-wife Kathryn Ward, hard-drinking playwright Jeremiah "Mac" MacDonald, magazine reporter Roy Morton, business manager Miles Atwood, and lawyer Charles Montgomery, one after another.

The main topic of discussion is Give Me Your Hand, the new play Russ is producing. The reporter hears it's in trouble, but Russ says that's untrue. He vows it will be ready for its Boston tryout right on schedule. He and writer Mac have a story about a middle-aged man romancing a 22-year-old woman, and just can't seem to make it work.

Kathryn keeps reminding him of his age, which Russ likes to lie about. Russ tells loyal young secretary and student actress Ellie Brown it is likely time to retire because the new show is a mess.

Ellie is in love with Russ, so much so she proposes marriage to him. That gives him an idea. What if the play had the young woman pursuing the man? That way he wouldn't seem such a lecher. A delighted Mac rewrites it, and everyone involved works on it at the Long Island mansion where the former actress Kathryn lives, partly thanks to her alimony from Russ.

A rich backer named Bacos wants in, but Atwood says his money isn't needed because an anonymous angel is financing the whole show. Ellie reads the woman's part, and strikes everybody as perfect for it. Gordon Reynolds, an up-and-coming young actor in Ellie's acting class, gets the male lead. Gordon has been in love for a long time with Ellie, but Russ doesn't discourage her love for him.

The show's so-so in Boston, and a few of them panic, but Russ insists it'll be a hit on Broadway, and, sure enough, he's right. Now, he needs to let down Ellie gently, and next thing he knows, she and Gordon have gotten married. Ellie returns exasperated because Gordon wants to give up theater and move to Butte, Montana. She strips and leaps into Russ's bed so Gordon can catch her there and demand an annulment.

Everybody gets every misunderstanding sorted out. The newlyweds decide to compromise, and Russ, who finally has figured out that Kathryn was the anonymous angel who financed the show, is ready to give their relationship a second act.

== Cast ==
- Clark Gable as Russell "Russ" Ward
- Carroll Baker as Ellie Brown / Borden
- Lilli Palmer as Kathryn Ward
- Lee J. Cobb as Jeremiah MacDonald
- Barry Coe as Gordon Reynolds
- Thomas Gomez as Demetrios Bacos
- Charles Lane as Miles Atwood
- Wendell Holmes as Charles Montgomery
- Tom Duggan as Roy Morton

== Previous versions ==
The 1935 film Accent on Youth starred Herbert Marshall and Sylvia Sidney. The 1950 film version was a musical entitled Mr. Music, starring Bing Crosby and Nancy Olson.

== Novelization ==
A worthwhile novelization of the screenplay was written by American writer Edward S. Aarons (1916–1975) under the mild pseudonym Edward Ronns, published in a mass market, tie-in paperback edition by Pyramid Books (cover price 35¢) with a release date of September, 1959 and copyright assigned to Paramount Pictures Corporation. (Aarons is best known for his prolific "Assignment" espionage series, featuring agent Sam Durell.)
