= Dorothy Wegman Raphaelson =

American dancer, novelist, vaudeville performer (1904–2005)

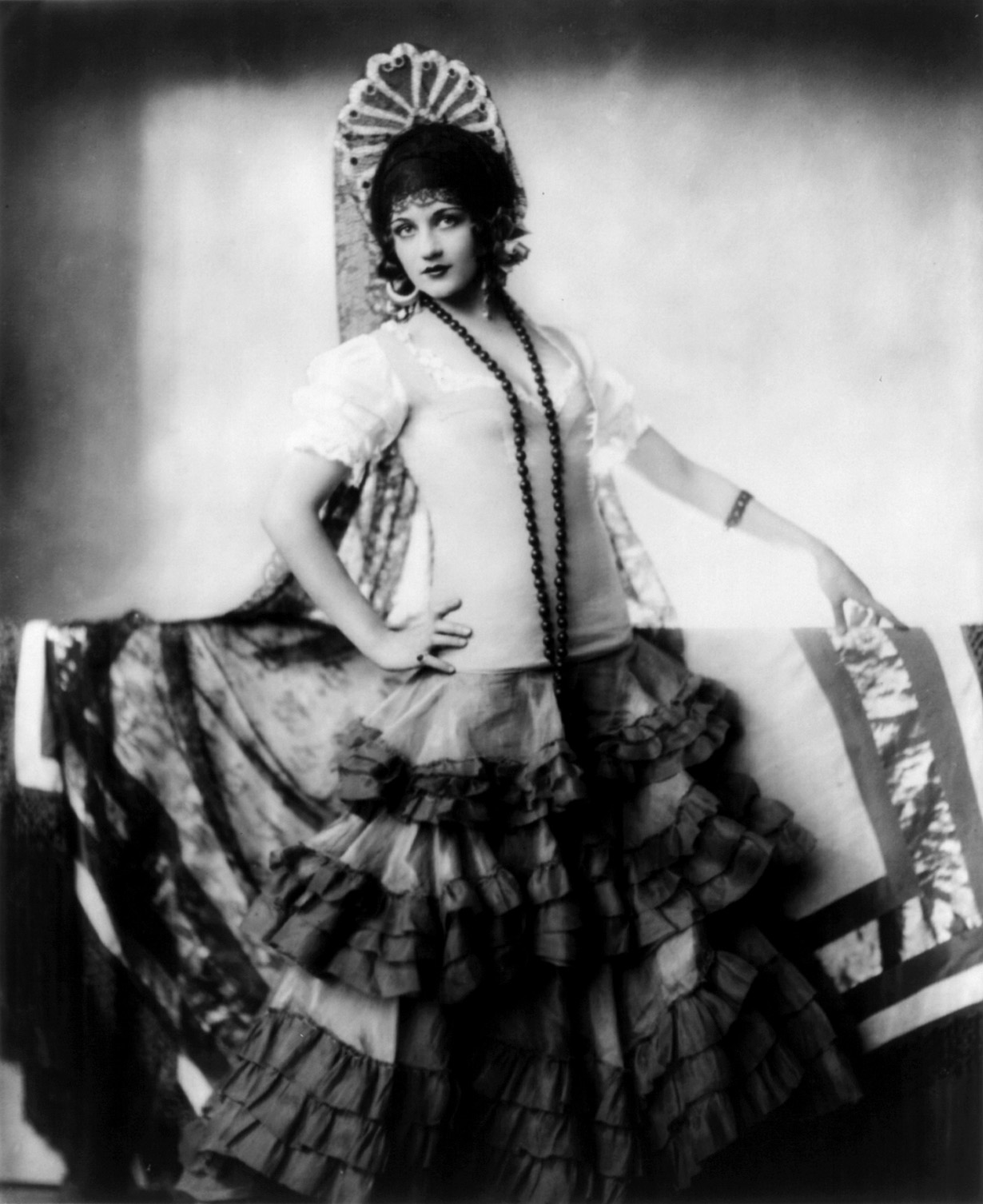
- Dorothy Wegman
- Born: Dorothy Deborah Wegman; November 27, 1904; New York City, U.S.
- Died: November 7, 2005 (aged 100); New York City, U.S.
- Occupation(s): Dancer, novelist
- Spouse: Samson Raphaelson (m. 1927; died 1983)
- Children: 2
- Relatives: Paul Raphaelson (grandson)

Dorothy Deborah Wegman Raphaelson (November 27, 1904 – November 7, 2005) was an American dancer, Ziegfeld Girl, vaudeville performer, and novelist.

== Early life ==
Dorothy Deborah Wegman was raised in the Washington Heights neighborhood of New York City. Her parents were immigrants from Russia. She had a sister Esther and a brother Daniel; their father was Abraham Wegman and their mother was Pasha (Krynsky) Wegman, and their father was an engineer.

== Career ==
Dorothy Wegman left high school to work full-time after her father's death. She worked for a clothing manufacturer while auditioning for stage roles. She danced in The Whirl of New York (1921), Bombo (1922), The Dancing Girl (1923) Topics of 1923 (1924), Big Boy (1925), No Foolin' (1926), and Rio Rita (1927–1928). She also appeared in the Ziegfeld Follies of 1924, the Ziegfeld Follies of 1925, and the Ziegfeld Follies of 1926. Her last show was the 1928 Ziegfeld production Rosalie, which she from which she "retired permanently, thanks to the stork and the increasing responsibilities of the domestic life she was eager to adapt.".

It is said that Marion Benda, "a well-known Ziegfeld beauty," nicknamed Wegman "Dorshka," but there is no evidence that Wegman ever performed on stage using that name. A 1935 newspaper article states that Wegman "distinguishes between old friends and newer friends and acquaintances now by the greeting they give her. 'Hello. Dolly,' belongs to her pre-Follies days; 'Hi, Dorothy' to the Follies period; and those who call her 'Dorshka' she knows from her later days in the theater and in Hollywood.".

Wegman did, however, publish two novels under the name Dorshka Raphaelson: Glorified (1930), based on her time as a dancer, and Morning Song (1948), which was also autobiographical.

== Personal life ==
Dorothy Wegman married writer Samson Raphaelson in late 1927. They had a son, Joel (1928–2021), and a daughter, Naomi (1930–2009). She was widowed when Samson Raphaelson died in 1983. She died in 2005, aged 100 years, in New York; at the time of her death, she was believed to be the second-to-last surviving Ziegfeld Girl. Her husband's papers, archived at the University of Illinois, includes a taped interview with Dorothy Wegman Raphaelson.
