= Accent on Youth (film) =

1935 film by Wesley Ruggles

- Directed by: Wesley Ruggles
- Screenplay by: Herbert Fields; Claude Binyon
- Produced by: Douglas MacLean
- Starring: Sylvia Sidney; Herbert Marshall; Phillip Reed; Holmes Herbert; Catherine Doucet; Astrid Allwyn
- Cinematography: Leon Shamroy
- Edited by: Otho Lovering
- Music by: Friedrich Hollaender; Tom Satterfield
- Production company: Paramount Pictures
- Distributed by: Paramount Pictures
- Release date: August 23, 1935
- Running time: 77 minutes
- Country: United States
- Language: English

Accent on Youth is a 1935 American comedy film directed by Wesley Ruggles and written by Herbert Fields and Claude Binyon based on the 1934 play of the same name written by Samson Raphaelson. The film stars Sylvia Sidney and Herbert Marshall and features Phillip Reed, Holmes Herbert, Catherine Doucet, Astrid Allwyn and Lon Chaney Jr. The film was released on August 23, 1935, by Paramount Pictures.

== Plot ==
When Steven Gaye, a successful New York playwright, turns forty he thinks he's too old for romance. But when he falls in love with his secretary Linda, he experiences the strongest emotions of his life. Feeling that he is too old for Linda, he decides to fix her up with Dick Reynolds, the young lead actor in his play. But while Dick is young and handsome, he is also dumb and immature. Tiring of the younger man, Linda longs for Steven's maturity and understanding.

== Cast ==
- Sylvia Sidney as Linda Brown
- Herbert Marshall as Steven Gaye
- Phillip Reed as Dickie Reynolds
- Holmes Herbert as Frank Galloway
- Catherine Doucet as Miss Eleanor Darling
- Astrid Allwyn as Genevieve Lang
- Ernest Cossart as Flogdell
- Lon Chaney Jr. as Chuck
- Dick Foran as Butch

== Reception ==
Andre Sennwald of The New York Times said, "Samson Raphaelson's pleasant little stage comedy of middle-aged love spends a good deal of its time being a garrulous bore in its motion picture version at the Paramount Theatre. Never notable for any startling excesses of invention, it slows down to a succession of dialogues as it reaches the screen, and is content to be a faithful photographic study of its original. It is still a mild delight, though, to contemplate the fresh and amusing point of view which is the basis of Accent on Youth. Mr. Raphaelson has written a comedy which might serve as a sort of amorous supplement to Walter Pitkin's hymn of encouragement to the middle-aged. He performs a definite service for the emotional bankrupt, even if he does not call it "Love Begins at Fifty."

Writing for The Spectator in 1935, Graham Greene described the film as a "dreary comedy", and characterized the acting of Marshall as the "usual canine performance of dumb suffering". Greene noted that there was one good scene toward the end of the film, but advised readers not to wait for it.
