= Golden Harvest (film) =

1933 film

- Directed by: Ralph Murphy
- Screenplay by: Nina Wilcox Putnam; Casey Robinson
- Produced by: Charles R. Rogers
- Starring: Richard Arlen; Chester Morris; Genevieve Tobin; Roscoe Ates
- Cinematography: Milton R. Krasner
- Music by: Harold Lewis
- Production company: Paramount Pictures
- Distributed by: Paramount Pictures
- Release date: September 22, 1933
- Running time: 72 minutes
- Country: United States
- Language: English

Golden Harvest is a 1933 American Pre-Code drama film directed by Ralph Murphy and written by Nina Wilcox Putnam and Casey Robinson. The film stars Richard Arlen, Chester Morris, Genevieve Tobin, Roscoe Ates, Julie Haydon, Elizabeth Patterson and Berton Churchill. The film was released on September 22, 1933, by Paramount Pictures.

== Plot ==
An ambitious grain trader Chris Martin, who through fair and foul means corners the wheat market and becomes a millionaire. Outgrowing his humble farm beginnings, Chris makes a bid for respectability by marrying Chicago socialite Cynthia Flint. Meanwhile, Chris's ex-sweetheart Ellen marries his down-to-earth brother Walt, who has chosen to remain on the family farm. Inevitably, the two brothers find themselves on opposite sides when Chris's greed overtakes his common sense.

== Cast ==
- Richard Arlen as Walt Martin
- Chester Morris as Chris Martin
- Genevieve Tobin as Cynthia Flint
- Roscoe Ates as Louis Jenkins
- Julie Haydon as Ellen Goodhue
- Elizabeth Patterson as Lydia
- Berton Churchill as Eben Martin
- Lawrence Gray as Hugh Jackson
- Henry Kolker as Henry Flint
- Richard Carle as Doctor Hoyt
- Charles Sellon as Jason Bowers
- Frederick Burton as Judge Goodhue
