= Skylark (1941 film) =

1941 film directed by Mark Sandrich

- Original poster
- Directed by: Mark Sandrich
- Written by: Zion Myers; Allan Scott
- Based on: Skylark by Samson Raphaelson
- Produced by: Mark Sandrich
- Starring: Claudette Colbert; Ray Milland; Brian Aherne
- Cinematography: Charles Lang
- Edited by: LeRoy Stone
- Music by: Victor Young
- Production company: Paramount Pictures
- Distributed by: Paramount Pictures
- Release date: November 21, 1941
- Running time: 94 minutes
- Country: United States
- Language: English

Skylark is a 1941 American comedy film directed by Mark Sandrich and starring Claudette Colbert, Ray Milland and Brian Aherne. It was produced and distributed by Paramount Pictures. Film historian James H. Farmer described Skylark as "light-hearted fluff" with the story of a woman on her fifth wedding anniversary, realizing that she is fed up with always coming in second to her husband's advertising business. Just at that moment, she meets a handsome attorney, and their innocent flirtation begins to turn into something more serious.

== Plot ==
On their fifth wedding anniversary, Lydia Kenyon (Claudette Colbert) feels she is neglected and treated insensitively by her husband, Tony (Ray Milland). He is very committed to his job as an advertising executive, and not only does it take up his time, but it requires a lot of less than desirable socializing with his clients. When Lydia finds out that Tony has sent his friend, George Gorell (Walter Abel), to select a fifth wedding anniversary gift for her, Lydia treats Tony's lack of sensitivity with humor, but when Tony, at one of their parties, "gives" their cook to his client's wife, the snooty Mrs. Myrtle Vantine (Binnie Barnes), Lydia becomes furious. Storming out of the party in the company of Jim Blake (Brian Aherne), a lawyer, who takes a frustrated Lydia off on a moonlight drive.

Lydia and Jim enjoy a pleasant outing, but nothing romantically happens as Lydia is driven back home. With the party now over, Tony is worried that Lydia has upset his client. He forces her to make an apology to Mrs. Vantine for causing a scene. Unbeknownst to Lydia, Jim has been carrying on an affair with Mrs. Vantine.

Embarrassed and angry, Lydia asks Jim to start divorce proceedings. Tony reacts, by claiming he will quit his job so that they can be together. Shortly after, however, Mrs. Vantine surprises Lydia with a visit and threatens to fire Tony if Lydia does not stop seeing Jim. Lydia explodes, insulting Mrs. Vantine, calling her a tramp and a "scheming cow." When Lydia discovers that Tony lied about quitting his job, she is granted a "Reno divorce", and begins seeing Jim seriously. Jim, in turn, has fallen in love with Lydia.

Tony refuses to accept the divorce and, since having lost his job, he takes a government job in South America hoping Lydia will come to him there. At their summer home, Lydia tells Tony she is now with Jim.

The next day Lydia and Jim go sailing on his yacht, ending up in a fierce storm. Lydia realizes she cannot live Jim's "peripatetic" lifestyle and still loves her husband. She ends her relationship with Jim and reunites with Tony as the ship docks in Havana, Cuba.

== Cast ==
- Claudette Colbert as Lydia Kenyon
- Ray Milland as Tony Kenyon
- Brian Aherne as Jim Blake
- Binnie Barnes as Myrtle Vantine
- Walter Abel as George Gorell
- Grant Mitchell as Frederick Vantine
- Mona Barrie as Charlette Gorell
- Ernest Cossart as Theodore
- James Rennie as Ned Franklyn
- Leonard Mudie as Jewelry clerk
- Warren Hymer as Big man in subway car
- Hobart Cavanaugh as Small man in subway car
- Edward Fielding as Scholarly man in subway car
- Leon Belasco as Long-haired man in subway car
- Irving Bacon as Ferryman
- Patricia Farr as Lil, Waitress at Hamburger Stand
- Fritz Feld as Maitre d'Hotel
- James Flavin as Subway Guard
- Henry Roquemore as Bartender
- Margaret Hayes as Blake's Receptionist

== Production ==
The film was based on Samson Raphaelson's novel that first appeared in the January 7–February 4, 1939 edition of Saturday Evening Post under the title Streamlined Heart. Raphaelson subsequently turned the novel into the stage play Skylark, as produced by John Golden (with its opening night on Broadway, New York, October 11, 1939, and was turned into a screenplay by Zion Myers and Allan Scott. (Note: Skylark as a play was also a London hit with Constance Cummings in the lead female role.) Paramount paid $85,000 for the film rights.

Allan Scott said the play "was very like the kind of plays I wrote myself but without a third act, so I rewrote it—barely managing, for the first time, to take an anti-Nazi stand in a comedy, just because it was a comedy."

== Reception ==
In a contemporary review, Variety magazine opined, "Picture carries several basic changes in story structure from Samson Raphaelson’s original tale which appeared as a 'Saturday Evening Post' serial, a book, and play. But revisions are decidedly advantageous in the transposition to the screen.

“Under skillful guidance of Mark Sandrich as producer-director, (the) story unfolds at a zestful pace, accentuating the comedic episodes to the utmost. Claudette Colbert’s performance of the wife (stage role created by Gertrude Lawrence), around whom the motivation revolves, is of high merit, and player takes advantage of every line and situation for delightful exposition. Ray Milland is topnotch as the business-absorbed advertising executive; Brian Aherne catches attention as the suave ‘other man’."

Film reviewer Hal Erickson, noted in 2019 "(that) 'Skylark's comic highlight is a slapstick sequence in which Colbert tries to prepare lunch in a yacht during a storm. The scene was shot in a single take, an accomplishment in which the actress took justifiable pride."

=== Awards ===
Loren L. Ryder was nominated for the Academy Award for Best Sound Recording, for work on Skylark.
