= Rendezvous at Midnight =

1935 film by Christy Cabanne

- Directed by: Christy Cabanne
- Screenplay by: Ferdinand Reyher; Gladys Buchanan Unger
- Produced by: Lou L. Ostrow
- Starring: Ralph Bellamy; Valerie Hobson; Catherine Doucet; Irene Ware; Helen Jerome Eddy; Purnell Pratt
- Cinematography: Robert H. Planck
- Edited by: Harry Marker
- Production company: Universal Pictures
- Distributed by: Universal Pictures
- Release date: February 11, 1935
- Running time: 60 minutes
- Country: United States
- Language: English

Rendezvous at Midnight is a 1935 American mystery film directed by Christy Cabanne and starring Ralph Bellamy, Valerie Hobson, Catherine Doucet and Irene Ware. The film was produced and distributed by Hollywood studio Universal Pictures. The film's title was originally intended for Secret of the Chateau, released the previous year, and the working title was then recycled for this film.

== Plot ==
Sandra Rogers is irritated that her fiancée, police commissioner Robert Edmonds, is always too busy with work to see her. To gain his attention, she jokingly confesses to having committed the murder of a ruthless businessman. When the businessman is discovered dead, suspicion points toward Rogers.

== Cast ==
- Ralph Bellamy as Commissioner Robert Edmonds
- Valerie Hobson as Sandra Rogers
- Catherine Doucet as Fernande
- Irene Ware as Myra
- Helen Jerome Eddy as Emmy
- Purnell Pratt as The Mayor
- Kathlyn Williams as Mrs. Arthur Dewey
- Edgar Kennedy as Mahoney
- Vivien Oakland as Lillian Haskins
- Arthur Vinton as Myles Crawford
- William P. Carleton as Judge
- Luis Alberni as Janitor

== Bibliography ==
- Weaver, Tom & Brunas, Michael & Brunas, John. Universal Horrors: The Studio's Classic Films, 1931-1946. McFarland & Company, 2007.
