= Emerson Treacy =

American actor (1900–1967)

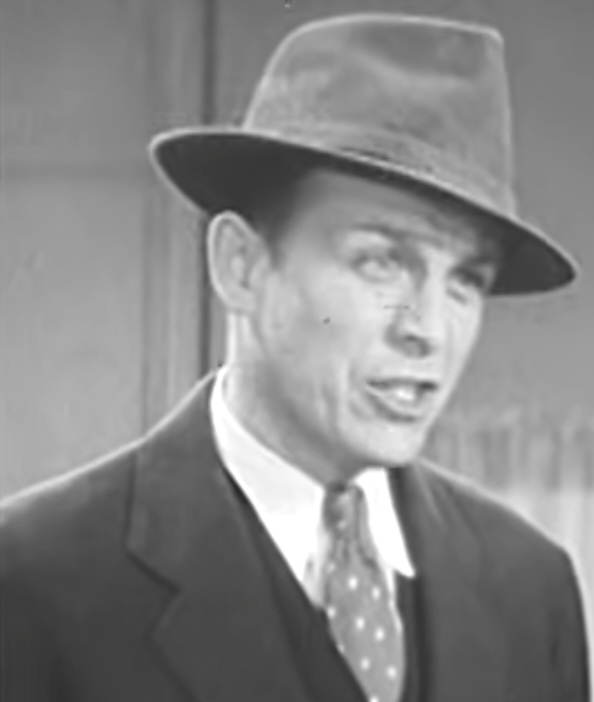
- Treacy in Long Shot (1939)
- Born: September 17, 1900; Philadelphia, Pennsylvania, U.S.
- Died: January 10, 1967 (aged 66); Hollywood, California, U.S.
- Resting place: Forest Lawn Memorial Park, Glendale
- Occupation: Actor
- Years active: 1930–1962
- Spouse: Ann McKay
- Children: 1

Emerson Treacy (September 17, 1900 – January 10, 1967) was an American film, Broadway, and radio actor.

== Early years ==
Treacy graduated from St. Joseph College in Philadelphia. When his father died in an automobile accident, Treacy became the executive responsible for the sporting goods factory that his family owned in Philadelphia. Prior to that development, he had planned to study law.

== Career ==
Treacy acted in New York, Los Angeles, and San Francisco. He and Gay Seabrook, "two of the best known portrayers of youthful roles in the country", performed in the play Tommy. Other plays in which he appeared included The Master Builder,a Take My Advice, Pigs, and Skidding. On Broadway he portrayed Purdy in Searching for the son (1936).

Treacy's professional acting debut occurred in a Provincetown Players production of Inheritors. He later worked for two years in a company headed by Jasper Deeter.

Treacy portrayed the flustered father of Spanky McFarland in the Our Gang short films Bedtime Worries and Wild Poses.

Treacy played in dozens of other feature films, including small roles in Adam's Rib and The Wrong Man, as well as television programs such as The Lone Ranger, Alfred Hitchcock Presents, and Perry Mason.

During World War II, Treacy wrote for the United States Office of War Information. He also worked for the American Red Cross as press agent for its chairman, Basil O'Connor, and as director of entertainment in the Southwest Pacific.

In 1949, Treacy sued Eddie Cantor and RKO Pictures for $150,000, alleging that "If You Knew Susie" contained portions of a play he submitted to the studio in 1938.

== Personal life and death ==
Treacy married actress Ann McKay on June 12, 1928, in Loyola College chapel. They had a son, Robert Emerson Treacy.

Treacy died at the Motion Picture Country Home and Hospital after undergoing surgery on January 10, 1967. He is buried in Forest Lawn Memorial Park, Glendale.

== Selected filmography ==
- Once a Gentleman (1930) - Junior
- Girls Demand Excitement (1931) - Bobby Cruikshank (uncredited)
- Once a Hero (1931, Short)
- Sky Raiders (1931) - Jimmy Devine
- The Mouthpiece (1932) - Robert Wilson (uncredited)
- Okay America! (1932) - Jerry Robbins
- Bedtime Worries (1933, Short) - Himself, Spanky's father
- Neighbors' Wives (1933) - Jeff Lee
- Wild Poses (1933, Short) - Himself, Spanky's father
- Two Alone (1934) - Milt Pollard
- The Man Who Reclaimed His Head (1934) - French Student Pacifist (uncredited)
- Eight Bells (1935) - Sparks
- Party Wire (1935) - Martin (uncredited)
- Honeymoon Limited (1935) - Bridegroom
- Champagne for Breakfast (1935) - Swifty Greer
- Dr. Socrates (1935) - Young Man (uncredited)
- Adventure in Manhattan (1936) - Injured Soldier in Play (uncredited)
- California Straight Ahead! (1937) - Charlie Porter
- Stand-In (1937) - Tommy (uncredited)
- Give Me a Sailor (1938) - Meryl (uncredited)
- Long Shot (1939) - Henry Knox
- Invitation to Happiness (1939) - Photographer (uncredited)
- They All Come Out (1939) - Larry Lee (uncredited)
- Gone with the Wind (1939) - (uncredited)
- Adam's Rib (1949) - Jules Frikke
- Key to the City (1950) - Reporter (uncredited)
- Wyoming Mail (1950) - Ben
- The Sound of Fury (1950) - Blind Preacher (uncredited)
- The Prowler (1951) - William Gilvray
- As Young as You Feel (1951) - Ernest (uncredited)
- Fort Worth (1951) - Ben Garvin
- Just This Once (1952) - Mr. Black (uncredited)
- Mutiny (1952) - Council Speaker
- Deadline – U.S.A. (1952) - City Editor (uncredited)
- A Star Is Born (1954) - Justice of the Peace (uncredited)
- Prince of Players (1955) - Protester Outside Theatre (uncredited)
- Run for Cover (1955) - Bank Clerk (uncredited)
- The Girl Can't Help It (1956) - Lawyer (uncredited)
- Alfred Hitchcock Presents (1956) (Season 1 Episode 25: "There Was an Old Woman") - Arthur the Deli Manager
- The Wrong Man (1956) - Mr. Wendon (uncredited)
- A Hatful of Rain (1957) - Mr. Wagner - Celia's Office Manager (uncredited)
- Sing, Boy, Sing (1958) - Doctor (uncredited)
- Handle with Care (1958) - Mr. Zollen (uncredited)
- Mardi Gras (1958) - Mr. Simmons (uncredited)
- The Sound and the Fury (1959) - Selby, Pawnshop Owner (uncredited)
- A Private's Affair (1959) - Mr. Walker (uncredited)
- All the Fine Young Cannibals (1960) - Minister (uncredited)
- High Time (1960) - Professor (uncredited)
- The Dark at the Top of the Stairs (1960) - George Williams (uncredited)
- Return to Peyton Place (1961) - Bud Humphries (uncredited)
- The Outsider (1961) - Mr. Bassett (uncredited)
- Lover Come Back (1961) - Magnuson, Ad Council Member (uncredited)
