= Son of the Border =

1933 film by Lloyd Nosler

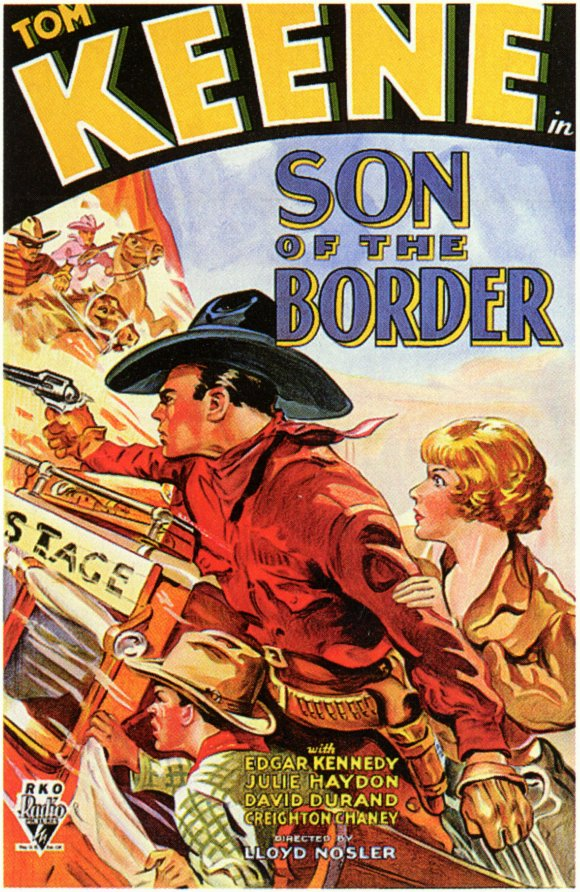
- Theatrical release poster
- Directed by: Lloyd Nosler
- Screenplay by: Wellyn Totman
- Story by: Wellyn Totman
- Produced by: David Lewis
- Starring: Tom Keene; Julie Haydon; Edgar Kennedy; Lon Chaney Jr. David Durand
- Cinematography: Nicholas Musuraca
- Edited by: Frederic Knudtson
- Music by: Arthur Lange; Max Steiner
- Production company: RKO Pictures
- Distributed by: RKO Pictures
- Release date: May 5, 1933
- Running time: 55 minutes
- Country: United States
- Language: English

Son of the Border is a 1933 American Pre-Code Western film directed by Lloyd Nosler, written by Wellyn Totman, and starring Tom Keene, Julie Haydon, Edgar Kennedy, Lon Chaney Jr. and David Durand. It was released on May 5, 1933 by RKO Pictures.

== Cast ==
- Tom Keene as Tom Owens
- Edgar Kennedy as Windy
- Julie Haydon as Doris
- David Durand as Frankie Breen
- Lon Chaney Jr. as Jack Breen
- Al Bridge as Tupper
- Charles King as Henchey
- Claudia Coleman as Sadie
