= Gay Seabrook =

American actress (1901–1970)

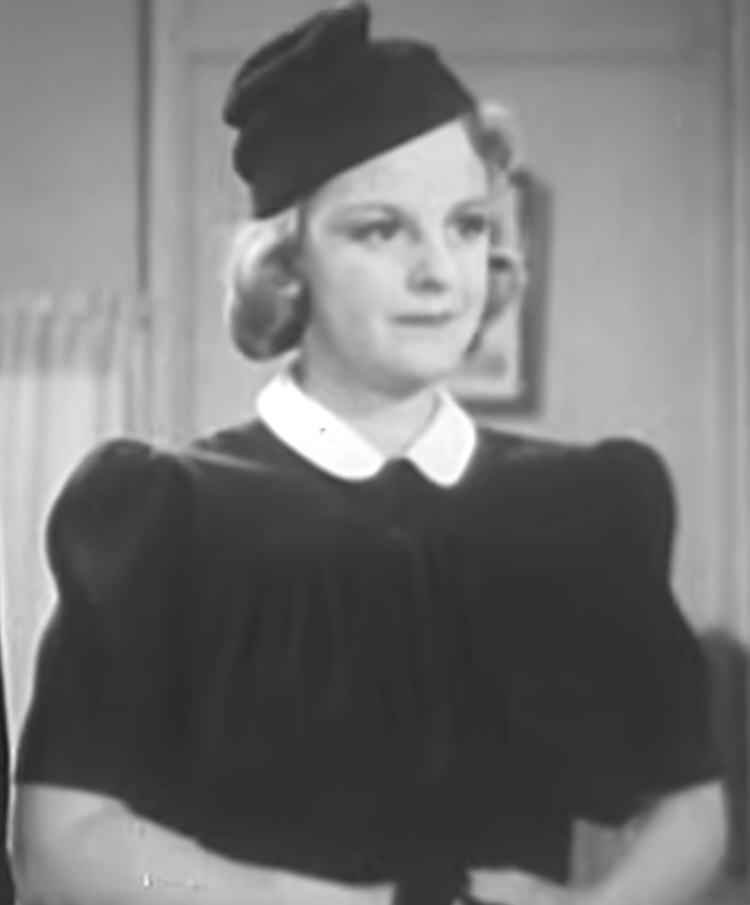
- Seabrook in Long Shot (1939)
- Born: Gladys Johnson; April 1, 1901; Seattle, Washington, U.S.
- Died: April 18, 1970 (aged 69); Bedford Hills, New York, U.S.
- Occupation: Actress
- Years active: 1930–1941

Gay Seabrook (born Gladys Johnson; April 1, 1901 – April 18, 1970) was an American film, Broadway and radio actress.

== Early years ==
Seabrook was the daughter of Rufus Johnson, a newspaper circulation manager.

She married screenwriter Edward E. Seabrook in 1920.

== Career ==
In the mid 1920s, Seabrook portrayed Mary Margaret in the play The Fool, which toured the United States for 62 weeks after having been presented "for some time in New York." She appeared in the Broadway productions of Crime Marches On (1935) and Three Men on a Horse (1942).

Seabrook was teamed with comedian Emerson Treacy to form the double-act Treacy and Seabrook. The team was very successful on radio and in theater during the early 1930s, with routines similar to those of real husband-and-wife team Burns and Allen. The two had worked together in 1928, teamed as young lovers in a production of the play Tommy. A newspaper article about the upcoming production described Treacy and Seabrook as "two of the best known portrayors of youthful roles in the country."

Seabrook also appeared as the ditzy mother of Spanky McFarland in the Our Gang short films Bedtime Worries and Wild Poses.

On radio, Seabrook played Susabelle on The Park Avenue Penners and was a member of the cast of Meet Mr. Meek.
