= Eight Bells (film) =

1935 American adventure film directed by Roy William Neill

- French poster
- Directed by: Roy William Neill
- Written by: Ethel Hill; Bruce Manning; John Wexley
- Based on: Eight Bells by Percy G. Mandley
- Produced by: J. G. Bachmann
- Starring: Ann Sothern; Ralph Bellamy; Catherine Doucet
- Cinematography: Joseph Walker
- Edited by: Gene Havlick
- Music by: Howard Jackson
- Production company: Columbia Pictures
- Distributed by: Columbia Pictures
- Release date: April 11, 1935
- Running time: 69 minutes
- Country: United States
- Language: English

Eight Bells is a 1935 American adventure film directed by Roy William Neill and starring Ann Sothern, Ralph Bellamy and Catherine Doucet. Produced by Columbia Pictures, it is based on the 1933 play Eight Bells by Percy G. Mandley.

== Plot ==
The owner of a line of steamships sends his prospective son-in-law Roy Dale to take a major cargo to Shanghai. Unbeknownst to him his daughter Marge smuggles herself aboard as a stowaway. Dale has experience only on passenger ships and when a hurricane hits he loses his nerve and wants to abandon ship. Marge sides with his first mate Steve Andrews and persuades the crew to stay aboard and keep the ship afloat.

== Cast ==
- Ann Sothern as Marge Walker
- Ralph Bellamy as Steve Andrews
- John Buckler as Roy Dale
- Catherine Doucet as Aunt Susan
- Arthur Hohl as Williams
- Charley Grapewin as Grayson
- Franklin Pangborn as Finch
- John Darrow as Carl
- Emerson Treacy as Sparks
- Addison Richards as Tracey
- David Clyde as MacIntyre
- Spencer Charters as Walker
- Lydia Knott as Sparks' Mother
- Keye Luke as Interpreter
- George Regas as Pedro
- Sidney Bracey as Gleason

== Bibliography ==
- Goble, Alan. The Complete Index to Literary Sources in Film. Walter de Gruyter, 1999.
