= The Scoundrel (1935 film) =

1935 film by Ben Hecht, Charles MacArthur

- Theatrical release poster
- Directed by: Ben Hecht; Charles MacArthur
- Written by: Ben Hecht; Charles MacArthur
- Produced by: Ben Hecht; Charles MacArthur
- Starring: Noël Coward; Julie Haydon; Stanley Ridges; Rosita Moreno; Lionel Stander
- Cinematography: Lee Garmes
- Edited by: Arthur Ellis
- Music by: George Antheil
- Production company: Paramount Pictures
- Distributed by: Paramount Pictures
- Release date: April 30, 1935
- Running time: 76 minutes
- Country: United States
- Language: English

The Scoundrel is a 1935 American drama film directed by Ben Hecht and Charles MacArthur, and starring Noël Coward, Julie Haydon, Stanley Ridges, Rosita Moreno and Lionel Stander. It was Coward's film debut, aside from a bit role in a silent film. It deals with supernatural redemption in a way rather similar to Ferenc Molnár's Liliom, and drew inspiration from the life of publisher Horace Liveright, who had died in September 1933.

== Plot ==
Anthony Mallare (Noël Coward) is a publisher who (it appears) wishes to ruin the life of every person he comes in contact with. Every sentence he says is like a poisoned dart aimed for the greatest damage, and delivered in cold lifeless tones. He is under no illusion regarding his own personality, remarking to his staff at large that he has found the perfect woman—one as empty as he is: "I must marry her ... it would be like two empty paper bags belabouring one another".

He finally manages to completely destroy the career and life of an aspiring young author Paul Decker (Stanley Ridges) and his girlfriend Cora Moore (Julie Haydon), who curses him with the hope that he will die friendless. Shortly afterward he is killed when his plane crashes into the ocean—Moore, upon hearing of the tragedy, remarks, "I've just found out there IS a God!"

Faced with the prospect of damnation he is allowed to go back to earth to find one person who will mourn for him—that person turns out to be Moore. Those around him are astonished to see him apparently alive and back at work, but gradually become aware that something supernatural is afoot.

== Cast ==
- Noël Coward as Anthony Mallare
- Julie Haydon as Cora Moore
- Stanley Ridges as Paul Decker
- Martha Sleeper as Julia Vivian
- Ernest Cossart as Jimmy Clay
- Rosita Moreno as Carlotta
- Eduardo Ciannelli as Maurice Stern
- Lionel Stander as Rothenstien
- O. Z. Whitehead as Calhoun
- Harry Davenport as Slezack
- Burgess Meredith as Bum (uncredited)

== Reception ==
The Scoundrel won the Academy Award for Best Original Story by writing team Hecht and MacArthur. It is an early role for Lionel Stander (his first year in pictures) and is a rare film role for columnist Alexander Woollcott typecast as an acid-tongued writer. It was also, reportedly, the first film for British-born character actor Ernest Cossart who had arrived in America in 1908 and, since the early 1920s, then been acting with New York's Theatre Guild theatre company.

The Scoundrel had its copyright renewed in 1962 (R297413 25 Jun 62) and for several years has been available via unauthorized VHS and DVD copies. In March 2008, the Noël Coward Society screened a 16mm copy of the film at the Paley Center for Media in New York City. (Renewal notice in Minus and Hale, Film Superlist, vol. 8, p. 747)
