= Down Memory Lane =

1949 film

Down Memory Lane is a 1949 Hollywood compilation film of silent and sound comedies from the library of pioneer producer Mack Sennett. Phil Karlson directed the film, with Steve Allen writing the screenplay and appearing on screen as himself.

== Production ==
Phil Karlson had just made a film for Eagle-Lion, The Big Cat, when asked to direct Down Memory Lane. He said someone from Eagle-Lion had the idea to make a film using all of Mack Sennett's old material including Bing Crosby and W.C. Fields. Karlson, who enjoyed the late-night disc jockey Steve Allen, approached him to work on the project.

Steve Allen remembered the film in his first memoir: “[Down Memory Lane] afforded me the unusual opportunity of working with Mack Sennett and Franklin Pangborn, two real experts in the field of comedy. [It was an] interesting assignment because I was given the opportunity to write the screenplay. This was not as weighty a matter as it sounds, however, since most of the picture consisted of ancient Mack Sennett film footage and the scenario ran to only sixteen pages. I also must admit that, although there were a few hilarious moments scattered here and there, it was rather a mess when patched together.”

Given the rushed shooting schedule (only two days), the "mess" Allen described was really deliberate. Allen fashioned the premise of a TV personality (Allen himself) reviving old Sennett comedies on his live program, only to have everything go wrong: the films arriving late and being shown in random order, with silent footage interrupted by sound footage; hastily improvised musical accompaniment; guest speaker Mack Sennett not showing up on time; and Allen's irate boss (played by Frank Nelson) objecting to the chaotic proceedings. Allen's loose framework fit the patchwork pattern of the old clips.

Critical reviews were respectful of the old film clips and welcomed newcomer Allen to the screen. In New South Wales, Australia, the film was double billed with Tokyo File 212.

== Cast ==
- Steve Allen (new footage)
- Bing Crosby (archive footage)
- W.C. Fields (archive footage)
- Franklin Pangborn (new/archive footage)
- Frank Nelson (new footage)
- Ben Turpin (archive footage)
- Irving Bacon (archive footage)
- Donald Novis (archive footage)
- Mack Sennett (new/archive footage)
- James Finlayson (archive footage)
- Marjorie Kane (archive footage)
- Mabel Normand (archive footage)
- Dorothy Granger (archive footage)
- Yvonne Peattie (new footage)
- Bud Jamison (archive footage)
- Charles Murray (archive footage)
- Billy Bletcher (archive footage)
- Mack Swain (archive footage)
- Gloria Swanson (archive footage)
- Elise Cavanna (archive footage)
- Florine McKinney (archive footage)
- Marvin Loback (archive footage)
- Toby Wing (archive footage)
- Phyllis Haver (archive footage)
- Harry Bowen (archive footage)
- Charles Gemora (archive footage)
- Renny McEvoy (archive footage)
- Thelma Hill (archive footage)
- Jo Ann Joyce (new footage)
- Rowland McCracken (new footage)
