= The Party's Over (1934 film) =

1934 film

- Film poster
- Directed by: Walter Lang
- Written by: Daniel Kusell; S. K. Lauren
- Starring: Stuart Erwin
- Distributed by: Columbia Pictures
- Release date: August 30, 1934
- Running time: 68 minutes
- Country: United States
- Language: English

The Party's Over is a 1934 American comedy film directed by Walter Lang.

== Cast ==
- Stuart Erwin as Bruce Blakely
- Ann Sothern as Ruth Walker
- Arline Judge as Phyllis
- Chick Chandler as Martin
- Patsy Kelly as Mabel
- Catherine Doucet as Sarah
- Marjorie Lytell as Betty Decker
- Henry Travers as Theodore
- William Bakewell as Clay
