= Come On Danger! =

1932 film directed by Robert Hill

- Directed by: Robert Hill
- Screenplay by: David Lewis; Lester Ilfeld
- Story by: Bennett Cohen
- Produced by: David O. Selznick
- Starring: Tom Keene; Julie Haydon
- Cinematography: Nick Musuraca
- Distributed by: RKO Radio Pictures
- Release date: 1932
- Running time: 60 minutes
- Country: United States
- Language: English
- Budget: $31,000
- Box office: $106,000

Come On Danger! is a 1932 Pre-Code Western film, and the first film Tom Keene would make at RKO Studios. It made a profit of $30,000.

It was remade in 1942 under the similar title, Come on Danger.

== Plot ==
Jim Madden, a Texas Ranger, is gunned down while investigating the murder of a local rancher. His younger brother, Larry, vows to track down the suspected killer, another rancher named Joan Stanton. While looking into the murders, he stumbles on a battle between Stanton and a group of men working for another rancher, Frank Sanderson. Stanton takes money from Sanderson that she feels is due to her.

Rescuing Stanton from the altercation, he keeps his identity as a Ranger secret, while attempting to learn the truth of what is going on. Through talks with Stanton, Madden learns that Sanderson has been setting her up for both the murder of the other rancher, and Jim's death.

Convinced by Stanton's story, Madden tells Stanton she must turn herself in, and she agrees. Before they can reach the Rangers, they are captured by Sanderson's men. Sanderson plans to kill Madden, and take Stanton to Mexico. With the help of the Rangers' cook, Rusty, as well as several of Stanton's men, Madden overcomes Sanderson and his men, and takes a vindicated Stanton back to the Rangers.

== Cast ==
(cast list as per AFI database)

- Tom Keene as Larry Madden
- Julie Haydon as Joan Stanton
- Rosco Ates as Rusty
- Robert Ellis as Frank Sanderson
- William Scott as Jim Madden
- Frank Lackteen as Piute
- Wade Boteler as Tex
- Roy Stewart as Inspector Clay
- Harry Tenbrook as Bill
