= Accent on Youth (play) =

Play written by Samson Raphaelson

- 2009 revival Playbill
- Original language: English
- Written by: Samson Raphaelson
- Characters: Chuck, Flogdell, Linda Brown, Steven Gaye
- Genre: Comedy

Premiere
- Date: Dec 25, 1934

Accent on Youth is a Broadway play written by Samson Raphaelson which debuted in 1934. It had three film adaptations and had a 2009 Broadway revival.

== Plot synopsis ==
Accent on Youth follows a lazy, middle-aged playwright who is spurred to write by his new young secretary.

== Production history ==
Accent on Youth opened at the Plymouth Theatre on Broadway on Christmas Day, 1934. It ran for 229 performances and closed on July 6, 1935. The original cast included Nicholas Hannen as playwright Steven Gaye and Constance Cummings as secretary Linda Brown. The play was directed by Benn W. Levy and the set was designed by Jo Mielziner.

The play has been adapted as a film several times. The 1935 film Accent on Youth starred Herbert Marshall and Sylvia Sidney. The second film version was a musical and titled Mr. Music in 1950, starring Bing Crosby and Nancy Olson. The third film version, titled But Not for Me (1959), starred Clark Gable with Carroll Baker.

In 2009, Accent on Youth was revived at the Samuel J. Friedman Theatre on Broadway. After 24 previews, it opened on April 29, 2009, and after 71 regular performances it closed on June 28, 2009. David Hyde Pierce played Steven Gaye, and Mary Catherine Garrison played Linda Brown. The show was directed by Daniel Sullivan with scenic design by John Lee Beatty, sound design by Obadiah Eaves, costume design by Jane Greenwood, lighting design by Brian MacDevitt, hair and wig design by Tom Watson, and makeup design by Angelina Avallone. It was produced by Daryl Roth and the Manhattan Theatre Club.
