= Franklin Pangborn =

American actor (1889–1958)

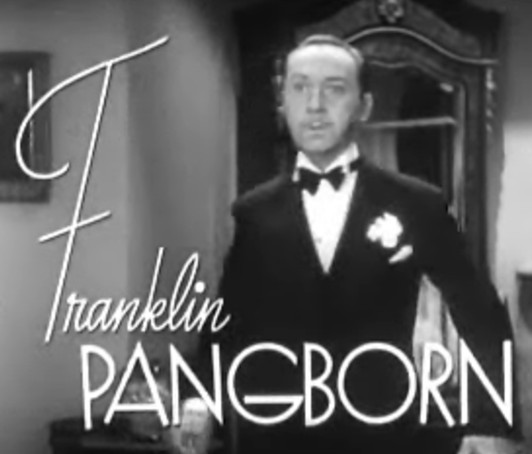
- Screenshot of trailer for Topper Takes a Trip, 1939
- Born: January 23, 1889; Newark, New Jersey, U.S.
- Died: July 20, 1958 (aged 69); Laguna Beach, California, U.S.
- Occupation: Actor
- Years active: 1910–1958

Franklin Pangborn (January 23, 1889 – July 20, 1958) was an American comedic character actor famous for playing small but memorable roles with comic flair. He appeared in many Preston Sturges movies as well as the W. C. Fields films International House, The Bank Dick, and Never Give a Sucker an Even Break. For his contributions to motion pictures, he received a star on the Hollywood Walk of Fame at 1500 Vine Street posthumously on February 8, 1960.

== Early years ==
Pangborn was born in Newark, New Jersey; his parents were Benjamin F. Pangborn, an engineer, and Harriet E. Pangborn. He attended Miller Street High School and Barringer High School. During World War I, he served for 14 months with the U.S. Army's 312th Infantry Regiment in Europe and was wounded and gassed during that time.

== Career ==
An encounter with actress Mildred Holland when he was 17 led to Pangborn's first professional acting experience. He was working for an insurance company when she learned about his ambitions for acting and offered him an extra's position with her company at $12 per week, initially during his two weeks' vacation. That opportunity grew into four years' touring with Holland and her troupe. Following that, he acted in Jessie Bonstelle's stock company.

Pangborn's Broadway credits included The Triumph of an Empress (1911), The Lily and the Prince (1911), Camille (1911), The Marionettes (1911), Ben Hur (1911), Joseph and His Brethren (1913), and Parasites (1924).

After being injured in the war, Pangborn went to the West Coast to recuperate. For three years he acted with Wilkes' Players in Los Angeles before he ventured into films. Along with the change in media he made a transition "from serious melodrama to the pie-throwing antics" of films of that time. His film debut came in The Jelly Fish, which was followed by Exit Smiling

In the early 1930s, Pangborn worked in short subjects for Mack Sennett, Hal Roach, Universal Pictures, Columbia Pictures, and Pathé Exchange, almost always in support of the leading players. (For example, he played a befuddled photographer opposite "Spanky" McFarland in the Our Gang short subject Wild Poses.) He also appeared in scores of feature films in small roles, cameos, and recurring gags.

Pangborn often played characters of similar styles: prissy, polite, elegant, highly energetic, often officious, fastidious, somewhat nervous, prone to becoming flustered but essentially upbeat, and with recognizable high-speed, patter-type speech. He typically played an officious desk clerk in a hotel, a self-important musician, a fastidious headwaiter, or an enthusiastic birdwatcher, and was usually put in a situation where he was frustrated or flustered by the antics of other characters.

Many years after Pangborn's death, LGBTQ historians claimed some of the characters he had portrayed onscreen had been gay stereotypes. Throughout his long career, such a topic was too sensitive to be discussed overtly by screenwriters, directors, studio executives or the newspaper columnists and critics who publicized movies. In 1933, before the Hays Office began censoring films, International House included a rare instance of a screenwriter and director briefly alluding to homosexuality in a scene that included Pangborn’s character. A character known as Professor Quail, portrayed by W.C. Fields, has just landed his autogyro on the roof of the titular hotel in the Chinese city of Wuhu, but he does not know where he is. He has the following exchange with the hotel manager, portrayed by Pangborn:

- Professor Quail: Hey! Where am I?
- Woman: Wu-Hu.
- Professor Quail: Woo-Hoo to you sweetheart! Hey Charlie! Where am I?
- Pangborn: WU-HU!
- (Fields then removes the flower from his lapel)
- Professor Quail: Don't let the posy fool ya!

Pangborn was an effective foil for many major comedians, including Fields, Harold Lloyd, Olsen and Johnson, and The Ritz Brothers. He appeared regularly in comedies, including several directed by Preston Sturges, and in some musicals of the 1940s. When movie roles became scarce, he worked in television, including The Red Skelton Show (in which he played a comical murderous bandit) and a This Is Your Life tribute to Mack Sennett, his old boss. Pangborn was briefly the announcer on Jack Paar's The Tonight Show in 1957, but was fired after the first few weeks for a lack of "spontaneous enthusiasm" and replaced by Hugh Downs.

Pangborn's final public performance came as a supporting player in The Red Skelton Show episode for April 22, 1958.

== Death ==
Pangborn died on July 20, 1958, in St. John's Hospital in Santa Monica, California, aged 69

== Selected filmography ==
All feature films are listed below. Many short films, however, are missing.

- The Jelly Fish (1926, Short) - Clarence, the Jelly Fish
- Exit Smiling (1926) - Cecil Lovelace (feature film debut)
- Finger Prints (1927) - The Bandoline Kid
- Getting Gertie's Garter (1927) - Algy Brooks
- High Hat (1927) - Minor Role
- The Night Bride (1927) - John Stockton
- Cradle Snatchers (1927) - Howard Drake
- The Rejuvenation of Aunt Mary (1927) - Melville
- The Girl in the Pullman (1927) - Hector Brooks
- My Friend from India (1927) - William / Tommy Valentine
- A Blonde for a Night (1928) - Hector
- On Trial (1928) - Turnbull
- The Rush Hour (1928) - Troublemaker at Bohemia Cafe (uncredited)
- Lady of the Pavements (1929) - M'sieu Dubrey, Dance Master
- The Sap (1929) - Ed Mason
- Not So Dumb (1930) - Leach
- Cheer Up and Smile (1930) - Professor
- Her Man (1930) - Sport
- A Lady Surrenders (1930) - Lawton
- Sunny (1930) - Party Guest (uncredited)
- A Woman of Experience (1931) - Hans, a Sailor
- Over the Counter (1932, Short) Department Store Employee (as Franklyn Pangborn)
- Stepping Sisters (1932) - Gason
- A Fool's Advice (1932) - Egbert, Hotel Clerk
- Midnight Patrol (1932)
- The Loud Mouth (1932, Short) - Freddie Quimby
- The Half-Naked Truth (1932) - Mr. Wellburton, Hotel Clerk
- The Candid Camera (1932, short) - Jack Towne
- Parachute Jumper (1933) - Man in Private Office (uncredited)
- Sweepings (1933) - Photographer (uncredited)
- Sing, Bing, Sing (1933, Short) - Herbert
- International House (1933) - Hotel Manager
- Professional Sweetheart (1933) - Herbert Childress
- Bed of Roses (1933) - Floorwalker
- The Important Witness (1933) - Groom
- Headline Shooter (1933) - Adolphus G. Crocker
- Menu (1933, Short) - John Xavier Omsk (uncredited)
- Wild Poses (1933, Little Rascals short) - Otto Phocus, the Portrait Photographer
- Only Yesterday (1933) - Tom (uncredited)
- Design for Living (1933) - Mr. Douglas, Theatrical Producer
- Flying Down to Rio (1933) - Hammerstein, the Hotel Manager (uncredited)
- Unknown Blonde (1934) - Male Co-Respondent
- Manhattan Love Song (1934) - Garrett Wetherby
- Strictly Dynamite (1934) - Mr. Bailey
- Many Happy Returns (1934) - Allen's Secretary
- Cockeyed Cavaliers (1934) - Town Crier (uncredited)
- King Kelly of the U.S.A. (1934) - J. Ashton Brockton
- Young and Beautiful (1934) - Radio Announcer
- That's Gratitude (1934) - Photographer
- Tomorrow's Youth (1934) - Thornton, the Tutor
- Imitation of Life (1934) - Mr. Carven (uncredited)
- Flirtation (1934) - Veterinarian
- College Rhythm (1934) - Peabody
- Eight Bells (1935) - Finch
- The Headline Woman (1935) - Hamilton
- She Married Her Boss (1935) - Window Dresser (uncredited)
- She Couldn't Take It (1935) - Spot's Secretary (uncredited)
- 1,000 Dollars a Minute (1935) - Reville
- Tango (1936) - Oscar the Photographer
- Don't Gamble with Love (1936) - Salesman
- Give Us This Night (1936) - Forcellini's Secretary
- Doughnuts and Society (1936) - Benson
- Mr. Deeds Goes to Town (1936) - the Tailor (uncredited)
- To Mary - with Love (1936) - Guest
- My Man Godfrey (1936) - Guthrie (uncredited)
- Swing Banditry (1936, short) - Radio Station Employee (uncredited)
- In His Steps (1936) - (uncredited)
- The Luckiest Girl in the World (1936) - Cashier
- Hats Off (1936) - Mr. Churchill
- Three Smart Girls (1936) - Jeweler (uncredited)
- The Mandarin Mystery (1936) - Mellish
- High Hat (1937) - Renaldo Breton
- Dangerous Number (1937) - Hotel Desk Clerk (uncredited)
- She's Dangerous (1937) - Renaud
- Rich Relations (1937) - Mr. Dwight
- They Wanted to Marry (1937) - Hotel Manager (uncredited)
- Swing High, Swing Low (1937) - Henri
- When Love Is Young (1937) - John Dorman
- We Have Our Moments (1937) - Joe the Bartender (uncredited)
- Step Lively, Jeeves! (1937) - Gaston
- A Star Is Born (1937) - Billy Moon (uncredited)
- Turn Off the Moon (1937) - Mr. Perkins
- Hotel Haywire (1937) - Fuller Brush Salesman (uncredited)
- Dangerous Holiday (1937) - Doffle
- She Had to Eat (1937) - Mr. Phoecian-Wylie
- Easy Living (1937) - Van Buren
- The Lady Escapes (1937) - Pierre
- It's All Yours (1937) - Schultz
- The Life of the Party (1937) - Beggs
- It Happened in Hollywood (1937) - Mr. Forsythe
- All Over Town (1937) - the Costumer
- Stage Door (1937) - Harcourt
- Living on Love (1937) - Ogilvie O. Oglethorpe
- I'll Take Romance (1937) - Kane's Secretary (uncredited)
- She Married an Artist (1937) - Paul
- Thrill of a Lifetime (1937) - Sam Williams
- Love on Toast (1937) - Finley
- Mad About Music (1938) - Hotel Manager (uncredited)
- Rebecca of Sunnybrook Farm (1938) - Hamilton Montmarcy
- Bluebeard's Eighth Wife (1938) - Assistant Hotel Manager
- Joy of Living (1938) - Orchestra Leader
- Doctor Rhythm (1938) - Mr. Stenchfield (Store Clerk)
- Vivacious Lady (1938) - Apartment Manager
- Three Blind Mice (1938) - Clerk
- Always Goodbye (1938) - Bicycle Salesman
- Four's a Crowd (1938) - Preston
- Carefree (1938) - Roland Hunter
- Just Around the Corner (1938) - Waters
- The Girl Downstairs (1938) - Adolf Pumpfel
- Topper Takes a Trip (1938) - Hotel Manager
- Broadway Serenade (1939) - Gene
- Fifth Avenue Girl (1939) - Higgins
- Turnabout (1940) - Mr. Pingboom
- Public Deb No. 1 (1940) - Bartender
- Spring Parade (1940) - Wiedlemeyer
- The Villain Still Pursued Her (1940) - Bartender (uncredited)
- Hit Parade of 1941 (1940) - Carter
- Christmas in July (1940) - Don Hartman, Radio Announcer
- The Bank Dick (1940) - J. Pinkerton Snoopington
- Where Did You Get That Girl? (1941) - Digby
- A Girl, a Guy and a Gob (1941) - Pet Shop Owner
- The Flame of New Orleans (1941) - Bellows
- Bachelor Daddy (1941) - Williams, Club Manager
- Tillie the Toiler (1941) - Perry Tweedale
- Never Give a Sucker an Even Break (1941) - The Producer
- Week-End for Three (1941) - Number Seven
- Sullivan's Travels (1941) - Mr. Casalsis
- Mr. District Attorney in the Carter Case (1941) - Charley Towne
- Call Out the Marines (1942) - Wilbur
- Obliging Young Lady (1942) - Prof. Gibney
- What's Cookin'? (1942) - Professor Bistell
- Moonlight Masquerade (1942) - Fairchild
- The Palm Beach Story (1942) - Manager
- Now, Voyager (1942) - Mr. Thompson
- George Washington Slept Here (1942) - Mr. Gibney
- Strictly in the Groove (1942) - Cathcart
- Reveille with Beverly (1943) - Vernon Lewis
- Two Weeks to Live (1943) - Mr. Pinkney
- Stage Door Canteen (1943) - Franklin Pangborn
- Honeymoon Lodge (1943) - Cathcart
- Holy Matrimony (1943) - Duncan Farll
- Crazy House (1943) - Hotel Clerk
- Never a Dull Moment (1943) - Sylvester
- My Best Gal (1944) - Mr. Porter
- The Great Moment (1944) - Dr. Heywood
- Allergic to Love (1944) - Stewart Ives III
- Hail the Conquering Hero (1944) - Reception Committee Chairman
- Reckless Age (1944) - Mr. Thurtle
- See My Lawyer (1945) - B.J. Wagonhorn
- The Horn Blows at Midnight (1945) - Radio Engineer / Sloan, House Detective
- Hollywood and Vine (1945) - Reggie Allen
- You Came Along (1945) - Hotel Clerk
- Tell It to a Star (1945) - Horace Lovelace
- The Sailor Takes a Wife (1945) - Salesman (uncredited)
- Lover Come Back (1946) - Hotel Clerk
- Two Guys from Milwaukee (1946) - Theatre Manager
- Calendar Girl (1947) - 'Dilly' Dillingsworth
- I'll Be Yours (1947) - Barber
- The Sin of Harold Diddlebock (1947) - Formfit Franklin
- Romance on the High Seas (1948) - Rio Hotel Clerk
- My Dream Is Yours (1949) - Sourpuss Manager
- Addio Mimí! (1949) - The Cat Lover
- Down Memory Lane (1949) - Mr. Sennett's Representative / Gilbert Sinclair
- Oh, Men! Oh, Women! (1957) - Steamship Clerk (uncredited)
- The Story of Mankind (1957) - Marquis de Varennes
