= The Luckiest Girl in the World =

1936 film by Edward Buzzell

- Directed by: Edward Buzzell
- Screenplay by: Herbert Fields; Henry Myers
- Story by: Anne Jordan
- Produced by: Charles R. Rogers
- Starring: Jane Wyatt; Louis Hayward; Nat Pendleton; Eugene Pallette; Catherine Doucet; Phillip Reed
- Cinematography: Merritt B. Gerstad
- Edited by: Dorothy Spencer
- Music by: Heinz Roemheld
- Production company: Universal Pictures
- Distributed by: Universal Pictures
- Release date: October 1, 1936
- Running time: 66 minutes
- Country: United States
- Language: English

The Luckiest Girl in the World is a 1936 American romantic comedy film directed by Edward Buzzell and written by Herbert Fields and Henry Myers. The film stars Jane Wyatt, Louis Hayward, Nat Pendleton, Eugene Pallette, Catherine Doucet and Phillip Reed. The film was released on October 1, 1936, by Universal Pictures.

== Plot ==
When the daughter of a millionaire wants to marry a poor man, her father challenges her to live on $150 a month to prove that she can survive.

== Cast ==
- Jane Wyatt as Pat Duncan
- Louis Hayward as Anthony McClellan
- Nat Pendleton as Dugan
- Eugene Pallette as Campbell Duncan
- Catherine Doucet as Mrs. Rosalie Duncan
- Phillip Reed as Percy Mayhew
- Viola Callahan as Mrs. Olson
- Dorothea Kent as Mary
- Edward Earle as Headwaiter
- Corbet Morris as Waiter
- Billy Wayne as Waiter
- Crauford Kent as Judge
- Mitchell Ingraham as Judge
- Milton Holmes as Tennis Player
- Leonard Carey as Butler
- Larry McGrath as Referee
- Al Lang as Referee
- Frances Gregg as Chambermaid
- Mary Russell as Manicurist
- Herbert Corthell as Bartender
- Henry Sylvester as Porter
- Dink Freeman as Bellboy
- Franklin Pangborn as Cashier
- Maude Turner Gordon as Elderly Woman
- James Flavin as Policeman
- Eddy Chandler as Policeman
- Harry Hayden as Manager
- Richard Powell as Announcer
- Pat Flaherty as Finnigan
- Samuel Adams as Doorman
- Walter Soderling as Store Proprietor
- Hooper Atchley as Conductor
- Harry Bowen as Taxicab Triver
- Harry Semels as Bum
- George Bean as Old Man
- Johnnie Morris as Spectator
- Elliott Rothe as Door Attendant
- George Du Count as Doorman at Café

== Production ==
The cinematographer was Merritt B. Gerstad.

== Critical response ==
BR Crisler of The New York Times wrote: "The cinematic counterpart of a racily written "novelette" in one of the popular five-cent magazines, it permits its pretty and neatly formularized people to behave and talk more brightly than usual, while its charming heroine, Jane Wyatt, gives off an authentic local debutante aura which is all the more unexpected."
