= Wake Up and Dream (1934 film) =

1934 film by Kurt Neumann

- Directed by: Kurt Neumann
- Screenplay by: John Meehan Jr.
- Story by: John Meehan Jr.
- Produced by: B. F. Zeidman
- Starring: Russ Columbo; Roger Pryor; June Knight; Catherine Doucet; Henry Armetta; Andy Devine
- Cinematography: Charles J. Stumar
- Edited by: Daniel Mandell
- Production company: Universal Pictures
- Distributed by: Universal Pictures
- Release date: October 1, 1934
- Running time: 77 minutes
- Country: United States
- Language: English

Wake Up and Dream is a 1934 American musical film directed by Kurt Neumann, written by John Meehan Jr., and starring Russ Columbo, Roger Pryor, June Knight, Catherine Doucet, Henry Armetta and Andy Devine. It was released on October 1, 1934, by Universal Pictures.

== Cast ==
- Russ Columbo as Paul Scotti
- Roger Pryor as Charlie Sullivan
- June Knight as Toby Brown
- Catherine Doucet as Madame Rose
- Henry Armetta as Giovanni Cellini
- Andy Devine as Joe Egbert aka Egghead
- Spencer Charters as Earl Craft
- Wini Shaw as Mae LaRue
- Gavin Gordon as Seabrook
- Richard Carle as Roger Babcock
- Paul Porcasi as Polopolis
- Maurice Black as Tom Romero
- Clarence Wilson as Hildebrand
- Arthur Hoyt as George Spelvin
- Philip Dakin as John Richards
- Jane Darwell as Landlady
