= Catherine Doucet =

American actress

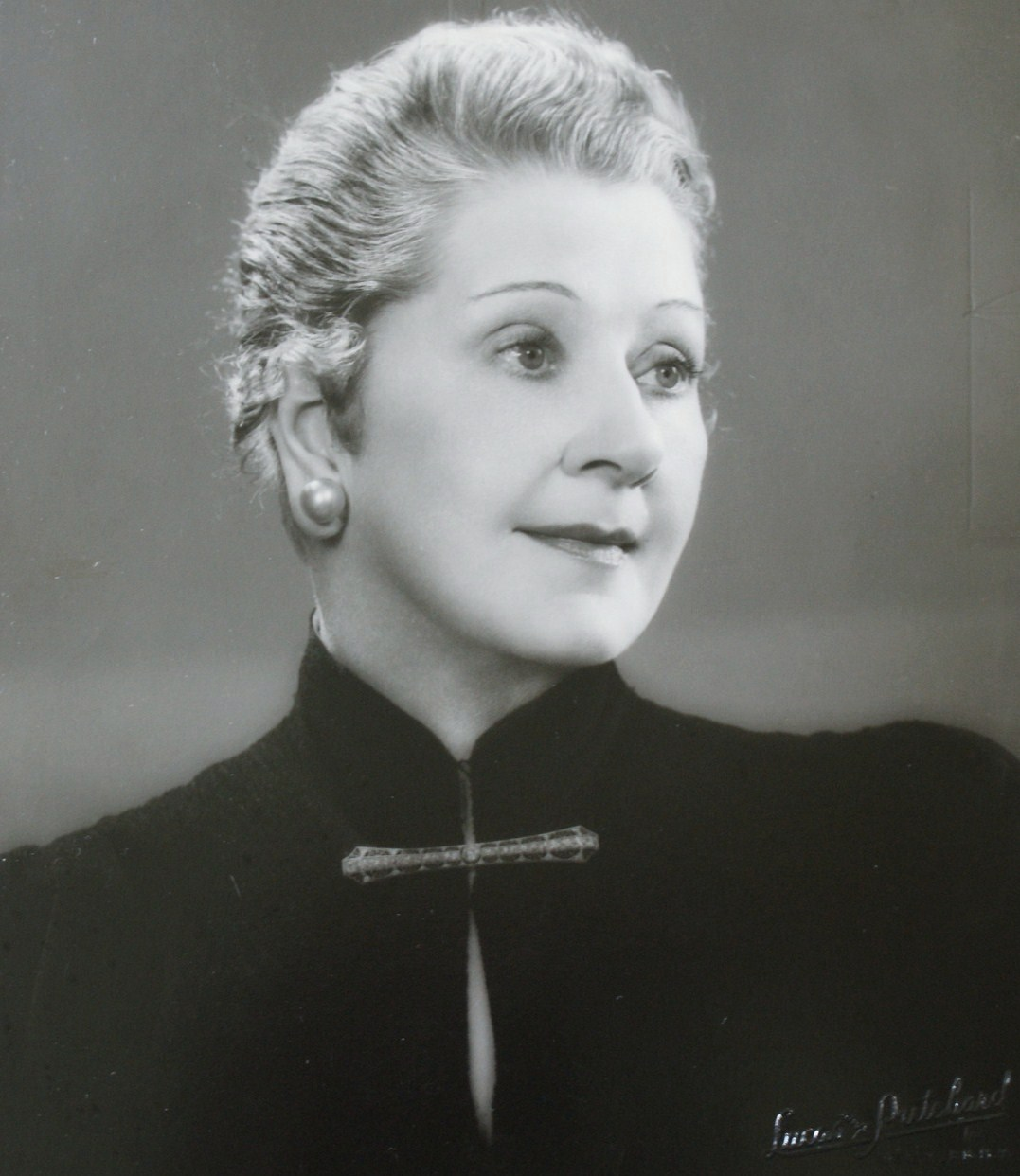
- Doucet in 1938
- Born: Catherine Green; June 20, 1875; Richmond, Virginia, U.S.
- Died: June 24, 1958 (aged 83); New York City, U.S.
- Other name: Catharine Doucet
- Occupation: Actress
- Years active: 1915-1954

Catherine Doucet (born Catherine Green; June 20, 1875 – June 24, 1958) was an American actress. She appeared in more than 30 films between 1915 and 1954. Her film debut came in As Husbands Go.

Doucet's work on Broadway began with Brown of Harvard (1906) and ended with Oh, Brother! (1945).

Doucet was married to Paul Doucet, "a prominent actor of French extraction" for 14 years until his death in 1928.

== Partial filmography ==
- From the Valley of the Missing (1915) - Mrs. Vandecar
- A Daughter of the Sea (1915) - Mrs.Rutland
- The Dragon (1916) - Mayme
- A Circus Romance (1916) - Zaidee
- Playing With Fire (1916) - Rosa Derblay
- The Steel Trail (1923) - Olga
- Beauty for Sale (1933) - Mrs. Gardner (uncredited)
- As Husbands Go (1934) - Emmie Sykes
- Little Man, What Now? (1934) - Mia Pinneberg
- The Party's Over (1934) - Sarah
- Servants' Entrance (1934) - Anastasia Gnu
- Wake Up and Dream (1934) - Madame Rose
- Rendezvous at Midnight (1935) - Fernande
- Eight Bells (1935) - Aunt Susan
- Age of Indiscretion (1935) - Jean Oliver
- Accent on Youth (1935) - Miss Eleanor Darling
- Millions in the Air (1935) - Mrs. Waldo-Walker
- These Three (1936) - Mrs. Lily Mortar
- The Golden Arrow (1936) - Miss Pommesby
- Poppy (1936) - Countess Maggi Tubbs DePuizzi
- The Luckiest Girl in the World (1936) - Mrs. Rosalie Duncan
- The Longest Night (1936) - Mrs. Wilson G. Wilson, a Customer
- Man of the People (1937) - Mrs. Hattie Reid
- When You're in Love (1937) - Jane Summers
- Oh, Doctor (1937) - Martha Striker
- Jim Hanvey, Detective (1937) - Adelaide Frost
- It Started with Eve (1941) - Mrs. Pennington
- Nothing But the Truth (1941) - Mrs. Van Dusen
- There's One Born Every Minute (1942) - Minerva Twine
- The Dude Goes West (1948) - Grandma Crockett
- Hollow Triumph (1948) - Mrs. Nielson - Patient (uncredited)
- Family Honeymoon (1949) - Mrs. Abercrombie
- Detective Story (1951) - Mrs. Farragut (uncredited)
