= Oh, Doctor =

1937 film directed by Ray McCarey

- Theatrical release poster
- Directed by: Ray McCarey
- Screenplay by: Harry Clork; Brown Holmes
- Based on: Oh, Doctor! by Harry Leon Wilson
- Produced by: Edmund Grainger
- Starring: Edward Everett Horton; Donrue Leighton; William Hall; Eve Arden; Thurston Hall; Catherine Doucet; William Demarest; Edward Brophy
- Cinematography: Milton Krasner
- Edited by: Bernard W. Burton
- Production company: Universal Pictures
- Distributed by: Universal Pictures
- Release date: April 1, 1937
- Running time: 72 minutes
- Country: United States
- Language: English

Oh, Doctor is a 1937 American comedy film directed by Ray McCarey and written by Harry Clork and Brown Holmes. It is based on the 1923 novel Oh, Doctor! by Harry Leon Wilson. The film stars Edward Everett Horton, Donrue Leighton, William Hall, Eve Arden, Thurston Hall, Catherine Doucet, William Demarest and Edward Brophy. The film was released on April 1, 1937, by Universal Pictures.

== Plot ==
Edward J. Billop is waiting to receive an inheritance, however he is a hypochondriac and believes he is going to die before receiving his inheritance.

== Cast ==
- Edward Everett Horton as Edward J. Billop
- Donrue Leighton as Helen Frohman
- William Hall as Rodney Cummings
- Eve Arden as Shirley Truman
- Thurston Hall as 'Doc' Erasmus Thurston
- Catherine Doucet as Martha Striker
- William Demarest as Marty Short
- Edward Brophy as Meg Smith
- Minerva Urecal as Death Watch Mary Mackleforth
