= Murder with Pictures =

1936 film by Charles Barton

- Directed by: Charles Barton
- Written by: George Harmon Coxe (writer); Jack Moffitt (writer); Sidney Salkow (writer)
- Produced by: Edward F. Cline (associate producer); A.M. Botsford (producer) (uncredited)
- Starring: See below
- Cinematography: Ted Tetzlaff
- Edited by: James E. Smith
- Distributed by: Paramount Pictures
- Release date: September 25, 1936
- Running time: 69 minutes
- Country: United States
- Language: English

Murder with Pictures is a 1936 American crime-mystery film based on a story by George Harmon Coxe. The film was directed by Charles Barton, the screenplay was written by Jack Moffitt and Sidney Salkow. Lew Ayres starred as Kent Murdock, Gail Patrick starred as Meg Archer; Paul Kelly and Benny Baker also appeared in the film. The film was released September 25, 1936.

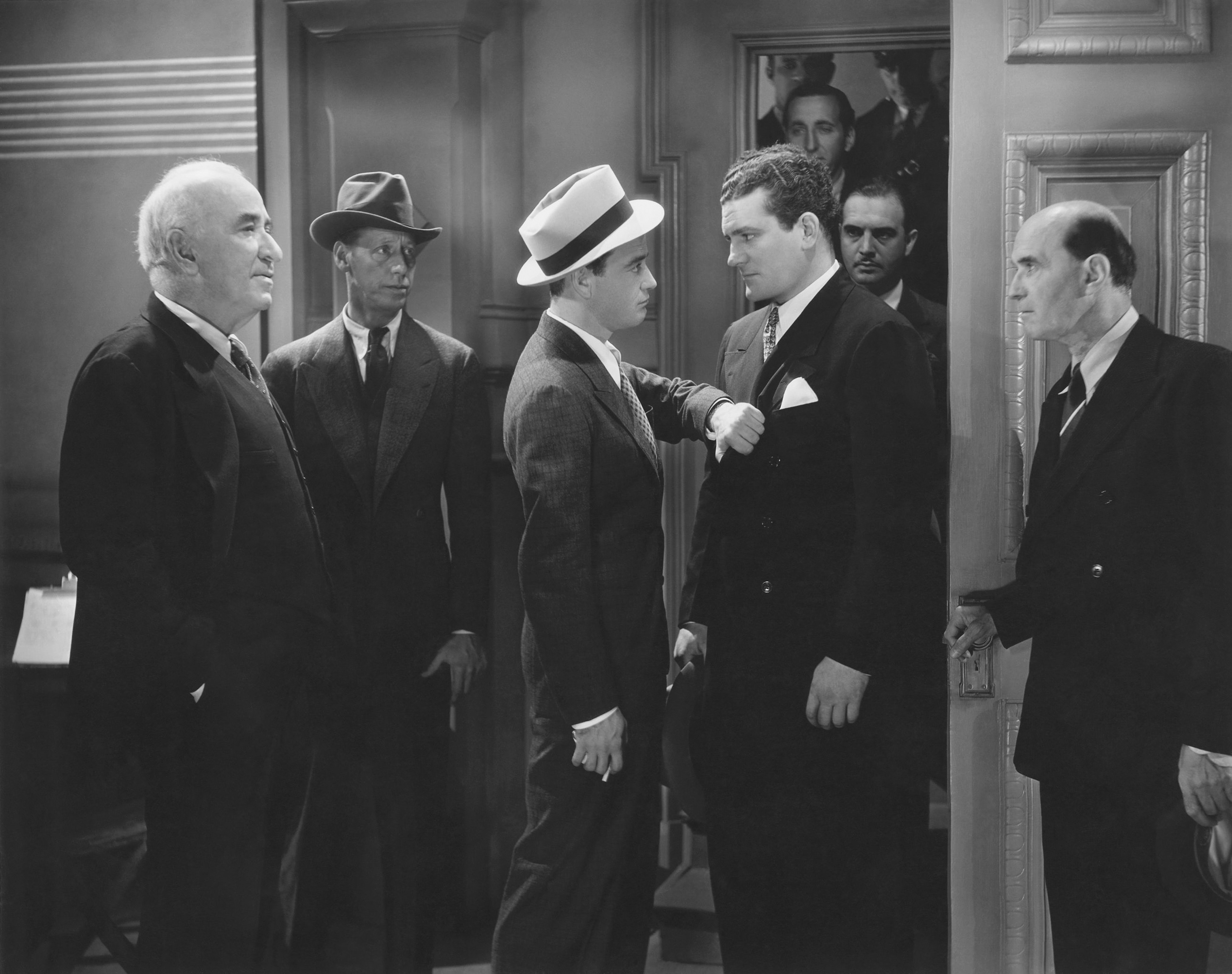
Frank Sheridan, Irving Bacon, Lew Ayres & Dan Rowan

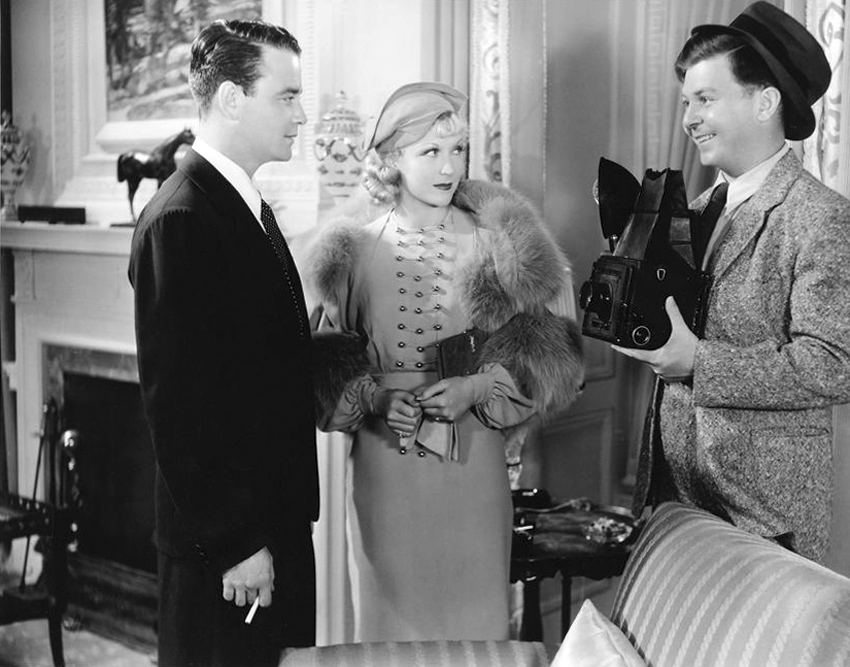
Lew Ayres, Joyce Compton and Benny Baker

== Plot ==
After gangster Nate Girard (Onslow Stevens) is acquitted of the murder of Arch Cusick, his lawyer Stanley Redfield (Ernest Cossart) invites the press to a party at his apartment during which he is killed. At the party newspaper photographer Kent Murdock (Lew Ayres) meets Meg Archer (Gail Patrick) who later escapes to Ayres' apartment in the same building after Redfield is killed. The police suspect Archer is responsible for the murder, but are unable to find her, even though she is hiding in Murdock's shower. Later during the police investigation at Redfield's apartment Murdock finds fellow newspaperman's cap which has a photographic plate hidden inside which can identify the murderer.

== Cast ==
- Lew Ayres as Kent Murdock
- Gail Patrick as Meg Archer
- Paul Kelly as I.B. McGoogin
- Benny Baker as Phil Doane
- Ernest Cossart as Stanley Redfield
- Onslow Stevens as Nate Girard
- Joyce Compton as Hester Boone
- Anthony Nace as Joe Cusick
- Joe Sawyer as Inspector Tom Bacon
- Don Rowan as Siki
- Frank Sheridan as Police Chief
- Irving Bacon as Det. Keogh
- Purnell Pratt as Editor
