= A Son Comes Home =

1936 film by Ewald André Dupont

- Directed by: E.A. Dupont
- Written by: Harry Hervey; Sylvia Thalberg
- Starring: Mary Boland; Julie Haydon; Donald Woods; Wallace Ford
- Cinematography: William C. Mellor
- Edited by: Chandler House
- Music by: Friedrich Hollaender; John Leipold
- Production company: Paramount Pictures
- Distributed by: Paramount Pictures
- Release date: July 31, 1936
- Running time: 77 minutes
- Country: United States
- Language: English

A Son Comes Home is a 1936 American drama film directed by E.A. Dupont and starring Mary Boland, Julie Haydon and Donald Woods. It was one of three films made by Dupont for Paramount Pictures.

== Cast ==
- Mary Boland as Mary Grady
- Julie Haydon as Jo
- Donald Woods as Denny
- Wallace Ford as Steve
- Roger Imhof as Detective Kennedy
- Anthony Nace as Brennan
- Gertrude W. Hoffman as Effie Wimple
- Eleanor Wesselhoeft as Essie Wimple
- Charles Middleton as Prosecutor
- Thomas E. Jackson as District Attorney
- John Wray as Gas Station Owner
- Robert Middlemass as Sheriff
- Lee Kohlmar as Proprietor
- Herbert Rawlinson as Bladeu
- George Hassell as Captain

== Bibliography ==
- St. Pierre, Paul Matthew. E.A. Dupont and His Contribution to British Film. Fairleigh Dickinson University Press, 2010 .
