= Angel (1937 film) =

1937 film by Ernst Lubitsch

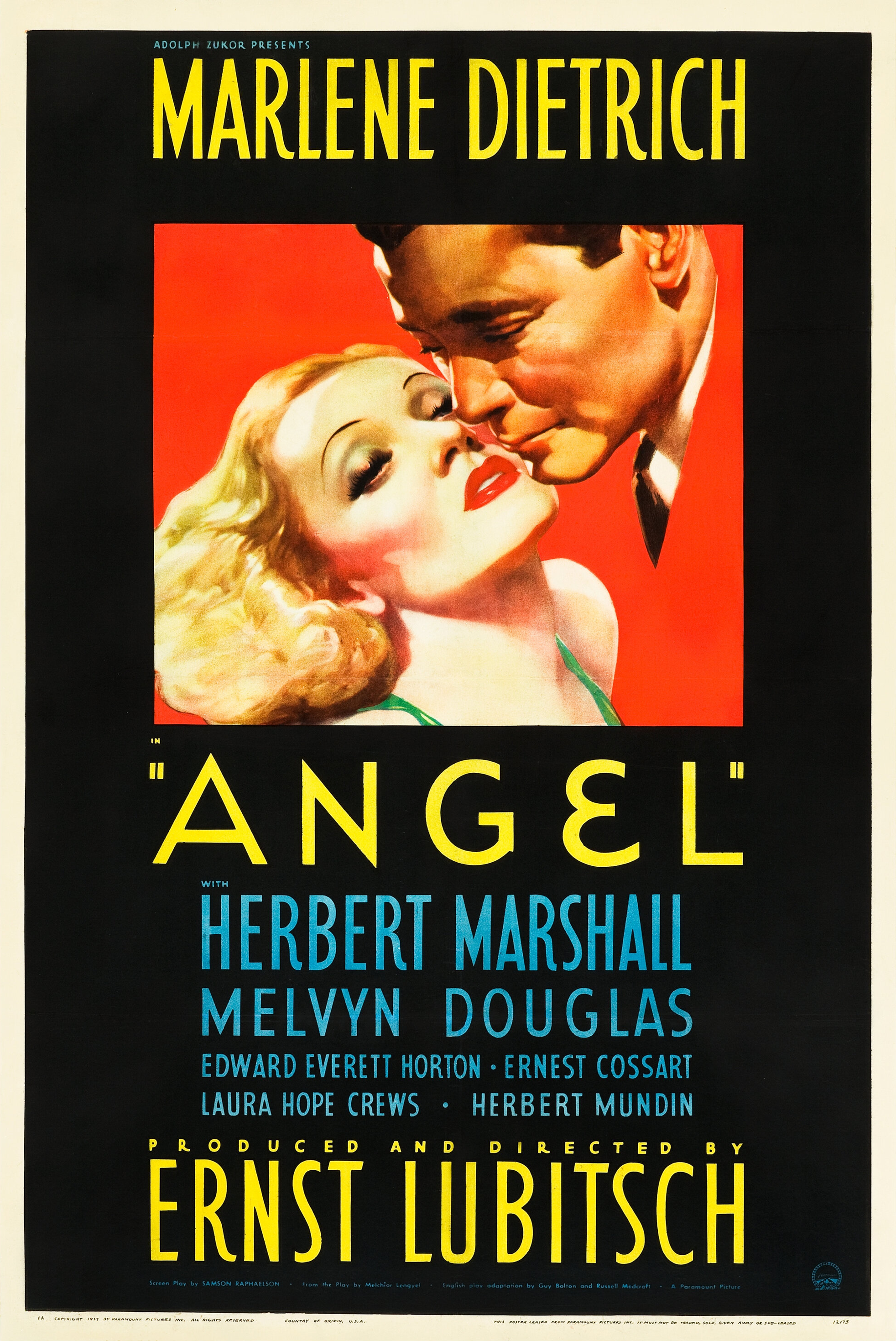
- Theatrical release poster
- Directed by: Ernst Lubitsch
- Screenplay by: Samson Raphaelson
- Based on: Angyal by Melchior Lengyel; English play adaptation by Guy Bolton Russell Medcraft
- Produced by: Ernst Lubitsch
- Starring: Marlene Dietrich; Herbert Marshall; Melvyn Douglas; Edward Everett Horton; Ernest Cossart; Laura Hope Crews; Herbert Mundin
- Cinematography: Charles Lang Jr.
- Edited by: William Shea
- Music by: Frederick Hollander
- Production company: Paramount Pictures
- Distributed by: Paramount Pictures
- Release date: 1937
- Running time: 91 minutes
- Country: United States
- Language: English

Angel is a 1937 American romantic drama film produced and directed by Ernst Lubitsch and starring Marlene Dietrich, Herbert Marshall, and Melvyn Douglas, with Edward Everett Horton, Ernest Cossart, Laura Hope Crews, and Herbert Mundin. The screenplay by Samson Raphaelson was based on an adaptation by Guy Bolton and Russell Medcraft from the play Angyal by Melchior Lengyel. The music score was by Frederick Hollander with additional music by Gioacchino Rossini from The Barber of Seville. The cinematography was by Charles Lang and the costume design by Travis Banton. The film was produced and distributed by Paramount Pictures.

== Plot ==
Maria, Lady Barker, is the wealthy but neglected wife of Sir Frederick Barker, a top-level British diplomat. Although Frederick loves her, he has been neglecting her in favor of his busy career. One day, when he is in Geneva on important business, she secretly flies to Paris to ask advice from her old friend, the Russian Grand Duchess Anna Dmitrievna, who operates a high-class escort business. By chance, Maria meets Anthony Halton, a charming man who has lived in India for several years. The salon was recommended to him by a friend. Although Maria insists that their liaison remain anonymous, they are attracted to each other, and they have a brief tryst, during which he calls her "Angel". Intending to have only a simple fling, she tries to end the relationship by leaving him without saying good-bye. However, he has fallen in love with her, and he begins searching for her.

At the races at Ascot, Maria spots Halton through her binoculars and goes home, pretending to have a headache. At a luncheon the following Saturday, Halton goes up to Frederick and reminds him that they are acquainted from the Great War—although they never met face-to-face. As young officers, they spent their Paris leaves with a charming modiste named Paulette. Identifying each other as "Poochy" and "Snooky" they treat each other as old friends. Halton confides in Frederick about his encounter with "Angel" and his obsession with her. The two of them make plans for Halton to have lunch with Frederick's wife, whose identity is heretofore unknown to Halton.

Maria is forewarned when Frederick tells her the story, thinking it will amuse her. Maria pretends not to recognize Halton when she meets him in her home. He has a moment's warning, seeing Maria's photograph just before she comes downstairs. When Maria and Halton are briefly left alone together, she makes it clear that she has no interest in continuing their relationship and that she considers his presence a threat to her marriage and her reputation. Still in love with her, he offers to meet her in Paris the following week, but she refuses.

Meanwhile, tickets have arrived for the vacation to Vienna that Frederick promised Maria earlier. Frederick has forgotten all about it, and decides to go to Geneva for a conference, although a capable man has been assigned the task. Even when he is reminded about the Vienna trip, he chooses to go to Geneva. Maria is crushed.

Frederick needs a private plane to ensure a long layover in Paris, and is shocked to learn that Lady Barker took a private plane there the week before. Maria asks Frederick to drop her off in Paris on his way to Geneva so she can go shopping. He conceals his suspicions from her, but goes to the Grand Duchess's salon to investigate. Maria appears. She is impressed by his jealousy—he wonders if she has been leading a double life—and the fact that he has missed the conference to find Angel. She claims that Angel is another woman who is in an adjoining room, and asks him to believe her without looking.

Frederick enters the other room, which is empty. While he is there, Halton asks Maria to come with him. Frederick joins them. He says he has met Angel. He says he has thought more about their married life together in the last few minutes than in all the years before. He humbly tells her that the train for Vienna leaves at 10. He has said goodbye to Angel, and so must Maria. She takes her arm and they walk out together without looking back.

== Cast ==
- Marlene Dietrich as Maria Barker
- Herbert Marshall as Sir Frederick Barker
- Melvyn Douglas as Anthony "Tony" Halton
- Edward Everett Horton as Graham, Sir Frederick's valet
- Ernest Cossart as Christopher "Chris" Wilton, the Barkers' butler
- Laura Hope Crews as the Grand Duchess Anna Dmitrievna
- Herbert Mundin as Mr. Greenwood
- Dennie Moore as Emma MacGillicuddy Wilton

== Reception ==
Rotten Tomatoes gives Angel a 100% rating, based on 5 contemporary and modern reviews.

Writing for The New York Times on November 4, 1937, Frank Nugent suggests that Lubitsch has lost “or mislaid” his famous touch, and lays the blame firmly at Dietrich's door. “If the Lubitsch touches were used at all, they were employed to caress the help,” meaning the supporting cast, whom he praised.

On June 19, 2017, Richard Brody praised the film in The New Yorker: “Ernst Lubitsch serves medicinal bitters in the champagne flutes of this terse, elliptical, comedy-tinged yet pain-seared romance.... a game of cruel destiny, albeit one that’s played on the world stage against a backdrop of looming war. He contrasts Frederick’s sexless gravity with Anthony’s seductive frivolity; with suavely piercing touches of erotic wit, he points ahead to the modern audacities of Belle de Jour and Last Tango in Paris, and to the higher irresponsibilities that make life worth living. In Lubitsch’s world, all politics is sexual.”

== Bibliography ==
- Halliwell, Leslie. Mountain of Dreams: The Golden Years of Paramount Pictures. Stonehill Publishing Company, 1976.
- McBride, Joseph. How Did Lubitsch Do It?. Columbia University Press, 2018.
