= Julie Haydon =

American actress (1910–1994)

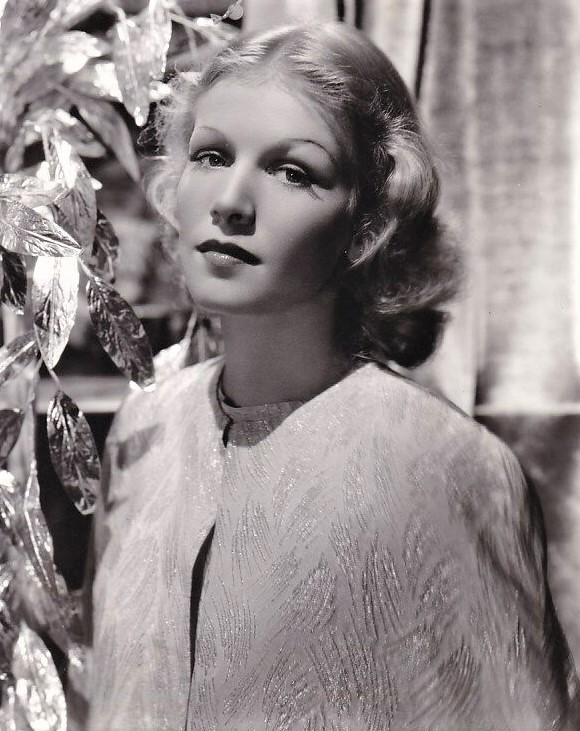
- Haydon in 1936
- Born: Donella Donaldson; June 10, 1910; Oak Park, Illinois, U.S.
- Died: December 24, 1994 (aged 84); La Crosse, Wisconsin, U.S.
- Resting place: Gate of Heaven Cemetery
- Occupation: Actress
- Years active: 1931–1963
- Spouse(s): George Jean Nathan (1955-1958) (his death)

Julie Haydon (born Donella Donaldson, June 10, 1910 – December 24, 1994) was an American Broadway, film, and television actress who received second billing as the female lead in the Ben Hecht–Charles MacArthur 1935 film vehicle for Noël Coward, The Scoundrel. After her Hollywood career ended in 1937, she turned to the theatre, originating the roles of Kitty Duval in The Time of Your Life (1939) and Laura Wingfield in The Glass Menagerie (1945). Later she became an editor of works by her husband and a lecturer on his works and about many celebrities with whom she worked.

== Early career and films ==
Born in the Chicago suburb of Oak Park, to Orin Donaldson, a newspaper publisher, and Ella Horton, Haydon began her acting career when she was 19, studying with Neely Dickson at the Hollywood Community Theater. She then toured with Minnie Maddern Fiske in Mrs. Bumstead Leigh. Within two years, she played Ophelia in a production of Hamlet at the Hollywood Playhouse.

Shortly after, she began appearing in films, in 1931. Her first film, in which she was billed under her birth name, was The Great Meadow, a Johnny Mack Brown Western drama made by MGM. In 1932, she signed with RKO, and her first major role came that year in The Conquerors, directed by William Wellman Her most notable performance came in 1935's The Scoundrel playing opposite Noël Coward, but, despite a new contract with MGM, only a few more films were to come in her short career, including A Family Affair (1937), the initial movie in the Andy Hardy series.

Some people, including Haydon, have held that it was Haydon and not Fay Wray who provided the heroine's bone-chilling screams in the King Kong film of 1933, but this claim is disputed.

Haydon retired from films in 1937.

== Theatre ==
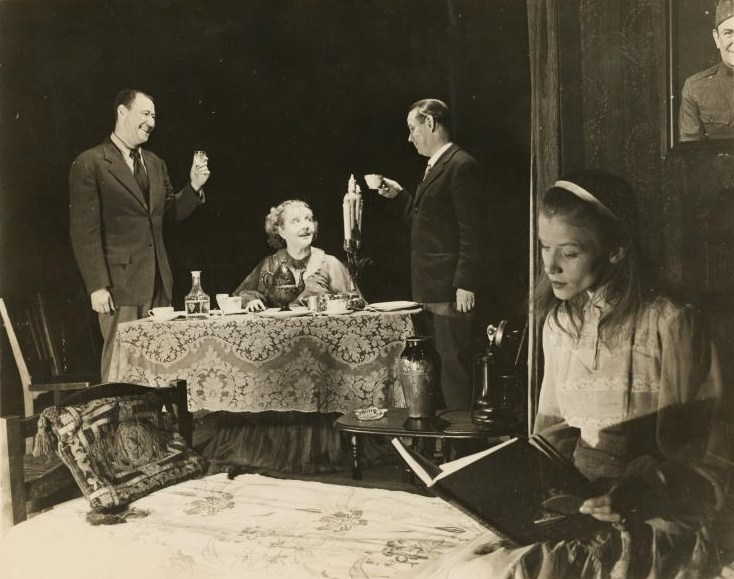
Haydon (right) in the original Broadway production of The Glass Menagerie (1945)

Haydon debuted on Broadway in 1935 in Bright Star by Philip Barry, which ran for only seven performances before closing. Her next Broadway production, Shadow and Substance by Paul Vincent Carroll, in which she played a saintly maid, was more successful, running for nine months in 1938. Next, in 1939, she created the role of the prostitute, Kitty Duval, in William Saroyan's Pulitzer Prize-winning The Time of Your Life. She also starred in the 1942 Broadway production of Saroyan's play Hello Out There. Haydon was the original Laura Wingfield in the first production of Tennessee Williams' The Glass Menagerie in 1945. Her final appearance on Broadway came in 1947's Our Lan'.

== Television ==
Beginning in 1949, Haydon began making appearances on television. She performed in episodes of Kraft Television Theater (1949), Armstrong Circle Theater (1950), The United States Steel Hour (1954), and Robert Montgomery Presents (1954).

== Later career ==
After his death, she delivered lectures taken from books written by her husband, George Jean Nathan, two collections of which Haydon edited. She also wrote occasional magazine articles about the actors she had worked with in her career.

Haydon recorded two albums for Folkways Records in the early 1960s, George Jean Nathan's The New American Credo (1962) and Colette's Music Hall (L'Envers du Music-Hall): By Colette (1963).

In 1962, the actress left New York City and returned to the Midwest. For a decade, she was actress in residence at the College of St. Teresa in Winona, Minnesota. She played the role of Amanda Wingfield in revivals of The Glass Menagerie, and in 1980, returned to New York to perform the role off-off-Broadway.

== Personal ==
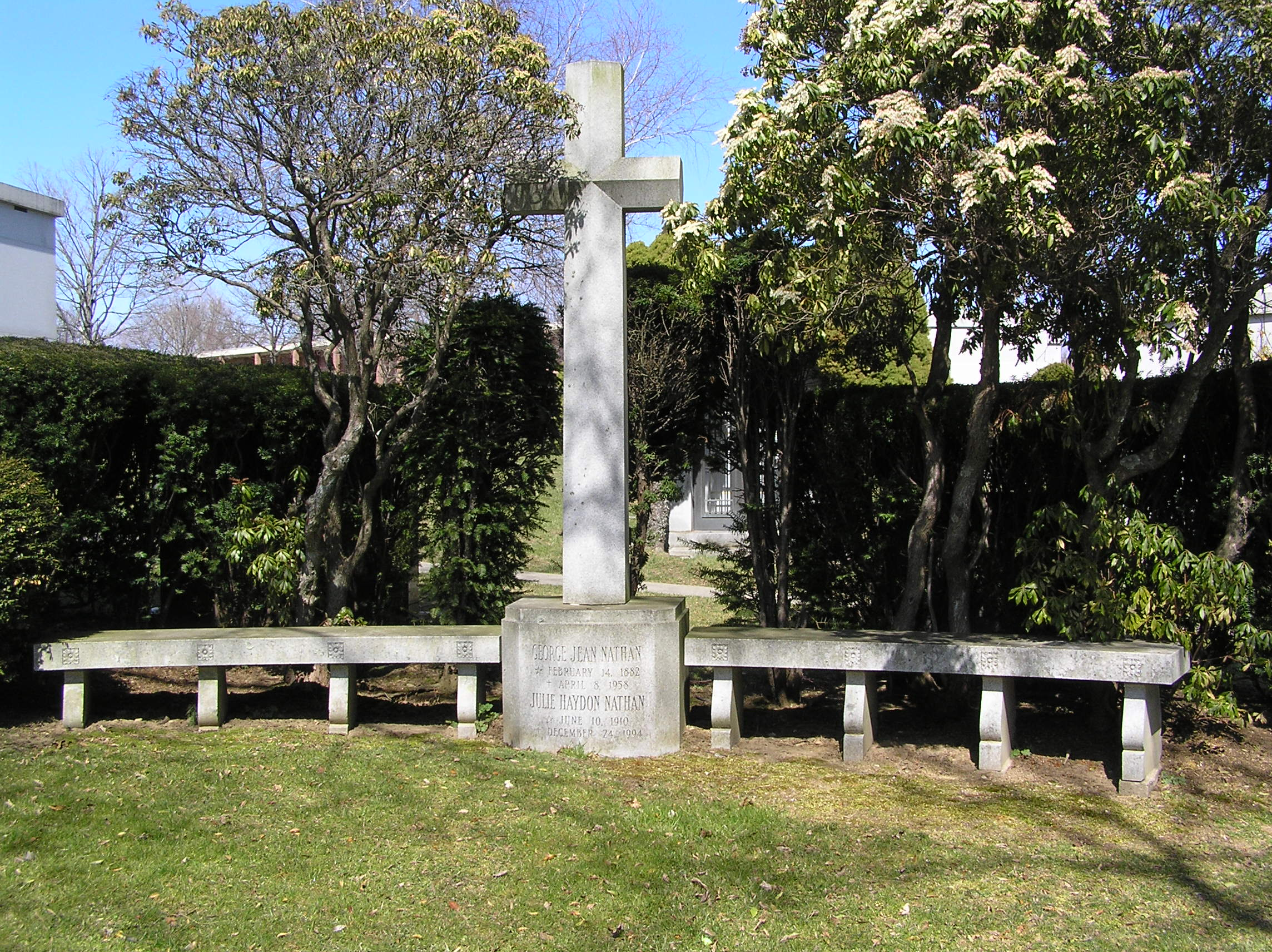
The grave of Julie Haydon and her husband, George Jean Nathan, in Gate of Heaven Cemetery

In 1955, at the age of 45, Haydon married 73-year-old drama critic George Jean Nathan, who died three years later. She never remarried and worked as a drama coach as well as appearing onstage in community theater and college productions.

== Death ==
Haydon died on December 24, 1994, in La Crosse, Wisconsin, of abdominal cancer, aged 84. She was buried next to her husband in the Cemetery of the Gate of Heaven in Hawthorne, New York.

A collection of Nathan-Haydon papers were donated to the La Crosse Public Library archives. A collection of Nathan papers is at Cornell University.

== Filmography ==
Year	Title	Role	Notes
1931	The Great Meadow	Pioneer Mother	Uncredited
1932	The Beast of the City	Blonde in Police Lineup	Uncredited
1932	Symphony of Six Million	Miss Grey - Felix's Nurse-Receptionist	
1932	The Roadhouse Murder	Maid	Uncredited
1932	Westward Passage	Bridesmaid	Uncredited
1932	Thirteen Women	Mary	(scenes deleted)
1932	Come On Danger!	Joan Stanton	
1932	A Bill of Divorcement	Party Guest	Uncredited
1932	The Conquerors	Frances Standish Lennox	
1933	Lucky Devils	Doris Jones	
1933	Scarlet River	Julie Haydon	Uncredited
1933	Song of the Eagle	Gretchen	
1933	Son of the Border	Doris	
1933	Golden Harvest	Ellen Goodhue	
1933	After Tonight	Hysterical Nurse	Uncredited
1934	Their Big Moment	Fay Harley	
1934	The Age of Innocence	May Welland	
1934	When Strangers Meet	Mrs. Mary Mason	
1935	The Scoundrel	Cora Moore	
1936	A Son Comes Home	Jo	
1936	The Longest Night	Eve Sutton	
1937	A Family Affair	Joan Hardy Martin	
1947	Citizen Saint	Sister Delphina	
