= The Longest Night (1936 film) =

1936 film

- Directed by: Errol Taggart
- Screenplay by: Robert Hardy Andrews
- Based on: The Whispering Window; 1936 novel by Cortland Fitzsimmons
- Produced by: Lucien Hubbard; Samuel Marx
- Starring: Robert Young; Florence Rice; Ted Healy; Julie Haydon; Catherine Doucet; Janet Beecher
- Cinematography: Lester White
- Edited by: Robert J. Kern
- Music by: Edward Ward
- Production company: Metro-Goldwyn-Mayer
- Distributed by: Metro-Goldwyn-Mayer
- Release date: October 2, 1936
- Running time: 51 minutes
- Country: United States
- Language: English

The Longest Night is a 1936 American mystery film directed by Errol Taggart and written by Robert Hardy Andrews. The film stars Robert Young, Florence Rice, Ted Healy, Julie Haydon, Catherine Doucet and Janet Beecher. The film was released on October 2, 1936, by Metro-Goldwyn-Mayer. Running a mere 51 minutes, it is believed to be the shortest feature ever produced by MGM, lending a certain irony to the title.

Elements of the plot were later reworked into the 1941 Marx Bros. comedy The Big Store.

== Plot ==
A department store where she works is robbed by Eve Sutton and an accomplice, Carl Briggs. A wristwatch they stole is recognized by Eve's sister Joan, who reports her suspicions to Mrs. Briggs, who is Eve's boss at the store.

Joan bumps into Charley Phelps, the store owner's son, who develops a personal interest in her. As an investigation into the robbery begins, Carl Briggs is shot and killed, his mother's body is also found, and Eve and a co-worker, Mr. Grover, are taken hostage.

To bring help, Joan starts a fire that sets off the store's sprinkler system. Firemen and police race to the scene as Joan and a crew of cleaning ladies fend off the gang, while Charley fights and overcomes the scheme's mastermind and killer, Grover.

== Cast ==
- Robert Young as Charley Phelps
- Florence Rice as Joan Sutton
- Ted Healy as Police Sergeant Magee
- Julie Haydon as Eve Sutton
- Catherine Doucet as Mrs. Wilson G. Wilson
- Janet Beecher as Mrs. Briggs
- Leslie Fenton as Carl Briggs
- Sidney Toler as Captain Holt
- Paul Stanton as Mr. Grover
- Etienne Girardot as Kendrick Kinney
- Tommy Bupp as Albert Wilson
- Samuel S. Hinds as Hastings
- Minor Watson as Hardy
- Kitty McHugh as Midge Riley
- Olin Howland as Smythe
- Gertrude Sutton as Miss Ashforth
- John Hyams as Mr. Fergus
