= David Lewis (producer) =

American film producer

- Born: David Levy; December 14, 1903; Trinidad, Colorado, U.S.
- Died: March 13, 1987 (aged 83); Los Angeles, California, U.S.
- Burial place: Forest Lawn Glendale
- Occupation: Film producer
- Partner: James Whale

David Lewis (born David Levy; December 14, 1903 – March 13, 1987) was a prominent American Hollywood film producer in the 1940s and 1950s, who produced such films as Dark Victory (1939), Arch of Triumph (1948), and Raintree County (1957). He worked for Warner Brothers, Paramount and M-G-M and was elected a vice president of Enterprise Productions, Inc. in 1946.

He was also the longtime romantic partner of director James Whale from 1930 to 1952. Although they were separated at the time of Whale's death in 1957, Lewis later released the contents of Whale's suicide note. Whale was cremated per his request and his ashes were interred in the Columbarium of Memory at Forest Lawn Memorial Park, Glendale. When David Lewis died in 1987, his executor and Whale biographer James Curtis had his ashes interred in a niche across from Whale's.

Lewis was portrayed in the 1998 film Gods and Monsters by David Dukes.

== Filmography ==
=== Producer ===
- More, 1969, executive producer (as David L. Lewis)
- Raintree County, 1957
- The Seventh Sin, 1957
- The End of the Affair, 1955
- Arch of Triumph, 1948
- The Other Love, 1947
- Tomorrow Is Forever, 1946
- It's a Pleasure, 1945
- Blind Adventure, 1933

=== Associate producer ===
- Frenchman's Creek, 1944
- Till We Meet Again, 1944
- In This Our Life, 1942
- Kings Row, 1942
- Million Dollar Baby, 1941
- All This, and Heaven Too, 1940
- 'Til We Meet Again, 1940
- Each Dawn I Die, 1939
- Dark Victory, 1939
- The Sisters, 1938 (uncredited)
- Secrets of an Actress, 1938 (uncredited)
- Four's a Crowd, 1938 (uncredited)
- Men Are Such Fools, 1938 (uncredited)
- Camille, 1936
- Riffraff, 1936
- Stingaree, 1934
- Where Sinners Meet, 1934
- Two Alone, 1934
- Headline Shooter, 1933
- Flying Devils, 1933
- Cross Fire, 1933
- Son of the Border, 1933
- Scarlet River, 1933

=== Writer ===
- Come on Danger!, 1932 (screenplay)
- Sinner's Parade, 1928 (story)

== Bibliography ==
- James Curtis, James Whale: A New World of Gods and Monsters, Faber & Faber, 1998
- Boze Hadleigh, Hollywood Gays, Barricade Books,1996
- James Curtis, The creative producer, Scarecrow Press, 1993
