= Long Shot (1939 film) =

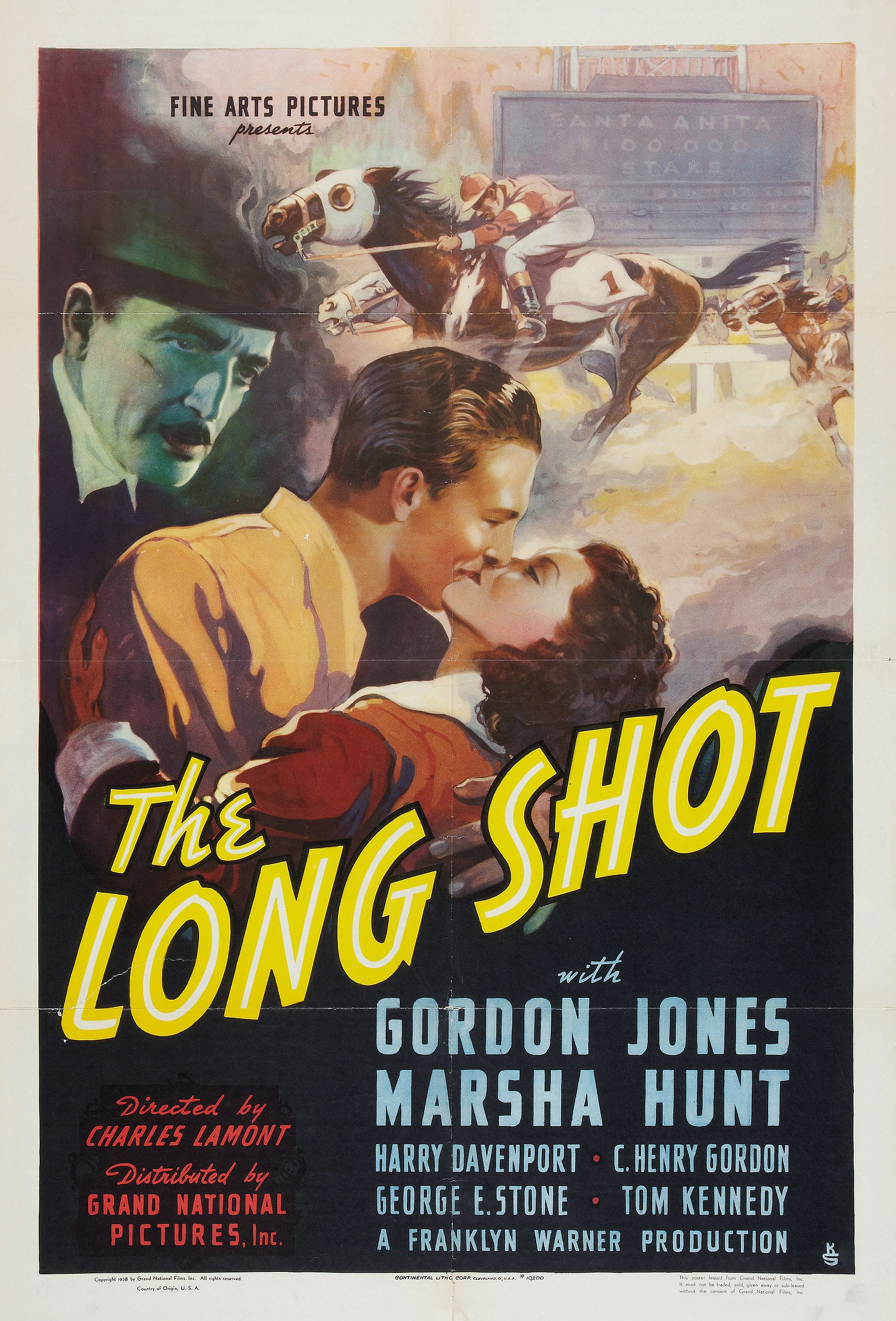
- Theatrical release poster
- Directed by: Charles Lamont
- Written by: Ewart Adamson (screenplay); Harry Beresford (original story) and George Callaghan (original story)
- Produced by: Charles Lamont (associate producer); Franklyn Warner (producer)
- Starring: See below
- Cinematography: Arthur Martinelli
- Edited by: Bernard Loftus
- Distributed by: Grand National Pictures
- Release date: January 6, 1939
- Running time: 69 minutes
- Country: United States
- Language: English

Long Shot is a 1939 American horse racing film directed by Charles Lamont. The film is also known as The Long Shot.

== Plot ==
Henry Sharon is about to be ruined financially by rival stable owner Lew Ralston when he gets an idea to fake his own death. His prize horse Certified Check is bequeathed to niece Martha, a young woman Ralston had hoped to marry.

Martha and friend Jeff Clayton begin to enter Certified Check in races, but he always loses. Then they get a tip that the horse hates running near the rail.

Given an outside post, Certified Check has a legitimate shot to win the big stakes race at Santa Anita, but first he must be kept out of sight to keep Ralston from sabotaging his chances.

== Cast ==
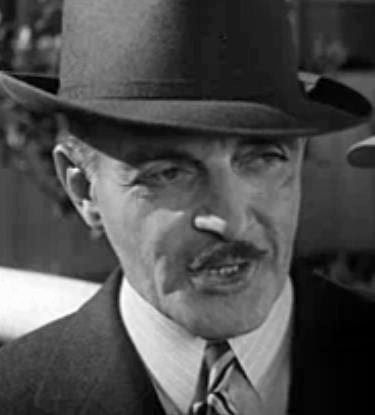
C. Henry Gordon in Long Shot

- Gordon Jones as Jeff Clayton
- Marsha Hunt as Martha Sharon
- C. Henry Gordon as Lew Ralston
- George Meeker as Dell Baker
- Harry Davenport as Henry Sharon
- George E. Stone as Danny Welch
- Frank Darien as Zeb Jenkins
- Tom Kennedy as Mike Claurens
- Emerson Treacy as Henry Knox
- Gay Seabrook as Helen Knox
- Benny Burt as Joe Popopopolis
- James Robinson as Tucky
- Denmore Chief as Certified Check
- Joe Hernandez as Racing Announcer
- James Keefe as Racing Announcer

Wilson Benge, Dorothy Fay, Earle Hodgins, Wilbur Mack, Carl Meyer, Lee Phelps, Norman Phillips, Jason Robards Sr. and Claire Rochelle appear uncredited.

== See also ==
- List of films about horses
- List of films about horse racing
