= The Conquerors (1932 film) =

1932 film

- Theatrical release poster
- Directed by: William Wellman
- Written by: Robert Lord
- Story by: Howard Estabrook
- Produced by: David O. Selznick
- Starring: Richard Dix; Ann Harding
- Cinematography: Edward Cronjager
- Edited by: William Hamilton
- Music by: Max Steiner
- Production company: RKO Radio Pictures
- Distributed by: RKO Radio Pictures
- Release date: November 18, 1932
- Running time: 86 minutes
- Country: United States
- Language: English
- Budget: $619,000
- Box office: $528,000

The Conquerors is a 1932 American pre-Code Western film that spans several generations in a family that lives through a series of financial crises with faith in the future of the country. It was directed by William A. Wellman, and stars Richard Dix and Ann Harding as a young couple who move from New York City to the American West and build a banking empire.

== Plot ==
In a prosperous New York City in 1873, lowly bank clerk Roger Standish is fired from his job after he is caught courting Caroline Ogden, the daughter of the bank's president. The failure of Ogden's bank in the Panic of 1873 brings about her father's financial collapse and death. Undismayed, Caroline offers to marry Roger and proposes that they travel west in search of new opportunities.

While traveling through Nebraska on a raft, Roger is shot when the Slade gang robs them. He is taken to the nearby town of Fort Allen, where the town's doctor, Dan L. Blake operates successfully. Although he is a drunkard, he proves competent, washing his hands and instruments in alcohol. His wife, Matilda, runs the hotel and welcomes Caroline like a member of the family. Months later, the same bandits attack the town. Roger rallies the community against them, but falls off his horse because he is still too weak; the posse continues on without him and hangs the entire gang at once. Caroline is inspired to open a bank there. With the help of the Blakes, Standish Bank is an instant success, and on opening day Caroline gives birth to twins, a boy and a girl.

As Fort Allen prospers, the possibility of being bypassed by the railroad threatens its growth. Caroline discovers that the railroad's president was a friend of her father, and charms him by offering to prepare a favorite sweetbread recipe from DelMonico's restaurant in New York City. The next scene is opening day of the railroad station, but the arrival of the first train is horribly marred. Their son is riding with Doc Blake in a buggy when the whistle blast from the incoming train throws the team of horses—who have never seen or heard a train—into a wild panic. They gallop down the road alongside the track and then swerve across it. The buggy is smashed upside down on the track in the path of the oncoming train, and the little boy is pinned underneath it. Doc struggles to get him free; the braking train kills the child and the man trying to save him. Though the family mourns their loss, Roger and Caroline's daughter, Frances grows into a beautiful young woman and marries Warren Lennox, one of the employees in Standish's bank.

The prosperous times come to an end with the depression of the 1890s. Overextended because of poor judgement by their son-in-law, the Standish National Bank is forced to close because of a run on its deposits. Caroline tells Standish they have lived through this before. Lennox commits suicide just as his son and Caroline and Roger's grandchild, Roger Standish Lennox, is born. The young boy grows up in a world of technological marvels, and after America's entry into World War I joins the Lafayette Escadrille and becomes a decorated fighter pilot. While watching him in a victory parade after the Armistice, Caroline collapses and dies.

The decade that follows is one of great growth. The Standish National Bank, having survived the hard times of the 1890s, is thriving once again under Lennox's management. His grandfather observes that the country is getting ahead of itself again, like a growing boy who busts his britches every once in a while. When the stock market crash of 1929 brings the good times to an end, Lennox approaches the elderly Standish and asks him to sign papers dissolving his $5 million trust fund so that Lennox can put the money into the bank. As Standish signs the papers, Lennox expresses his optimism that the country will recover and reach new heights, filling his grandfather with pride at both Lennox's sense of responsibility and his faith in America's future.

== Cast ==
- Richard Dix as Roger Standish/Roger Lennox
- Ann Harding as Caroline Ogden
- Edna May Oliver as Matilda Blake
- Guy Kibbee as Dan L. Blake
- Julie Haydon as Frances Standish Lennox
- Donald Cook as Warren Lennox
- Walter Walker as Thomas B. Ogden
- Wally Albright as Twins
- Marilyn Knowlden as Twins
- Harry Holman as Stubby
- Jason Robards, Sr. as Lane (as Jason Robards)
- E. H. Calvert as Doctor

== Production ==
The railroad scenes were filmed on the Sierra Railroad in Tuolumne County, California.

== Reception ==
According to RKO records, the film recorded a loss of $230,000.
