= Mr. Music =

1950 film by Richard Haydn

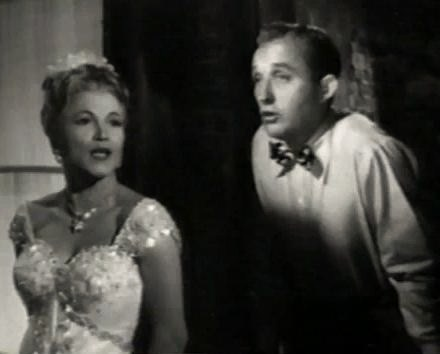
- Dorothy Kirsten and Bing Crosby in Mr. Music
- Directed by: Richard Haydn
- Written by: Samson Raphaelson (play Accent on Youth); Arthur Sheekman (screenplay)
- Starring: Bing Crosby; Nancy Olson; Charles Coburn; Groucho Marx
- Cinematography: George Barnes
- Edited by: Doane Harrison; Everett Douglas
- Music by: Van Cleave
- Distributed by: Paramount Pictures
- Release date: December 20, 1950 (New York)
- Running time: 110 minutes
- Country: United States
- Language: English
- Box office: $2.3 million (US/ Canada rentals)

Mr. Music is a 1950 film starring Bing Crosby and Nancy Olson, directed by Richard Haydn, and released by Paramount Pictures. It is based on the play Accent on Youth written by Samson Raphaelson. Filming took place from October to December 1949 in Hollywood.

== Plot ==
New York theater producer Alex Conway travels with composer Paul Merrick to Lawford College, Paul’s alma mater, where students are reviving one of his musicals. The current campus hero is Jefferson Blake, a handsome athlete, so Katherine Holbrook—the class valedictorian and chair of the alumni welcoming committee—convinces Paul to mention Jeff in one of his songs.

Paul sings "And You'll Be Home" in the show. After the show, Paul and Alex return to New York. Although Paul is broke, he would rather play golf than work. When he asks Alex for a $15,000 advance against his next musical, which Alex plans to produce with financing from multi-millionaire Tippy Carpenter, Alex agrees on the condition that Paul hire a secretary to ensure that he stays productive and does not squander the money. Paul agrees but has second thoughts when he discovers that Alex has hired the serious Kate.

Kate continually hounds him to work, but Paul snubs her efforts so that he can play golf and entertain his girlfriend Lorna. Kate, an aspiring psychiatrist, accuses Paul of being afraid of failure. Paul intends to fire Kate but feels guilty because he would be breaking his agreement with Alex.

Lorna announces her intention to marry Tippy for his money. Paul discovers that Kate and her aunt Amy have moved into the guest room of his penthouse apartment. He begins working on a new score, and when Jeff visits the city, Paul encourages him to take Kate on the town. For the first time, Jeff notices Kate's charms and kisses her, but Kate is more interested in the older, more mature Paul than in Jeff.

After three weeks, Paul throws a party to celebrate that he has written eight songs and completed the score for the musical revue Mr. Music. The day after the party, Jeff tells Paul that he is losing competitions because he cannot stop thinking about Kate, even though he knows that Kate is in love with Paul. Paul is surprised to hear about Kate's feelings, and when Lorna returns to him and they become engaged, he tells Kate about Jeff's visit and that she should pursue someone closer to her own age.

Kate is devastated and plans to quit but refrains when she learns that Tippy has pulled his money from the show. Aunt Amy tries to interest her wealthy friend Jerome Thisbee to back the show, but Alex and Paul are disappointed when Thisbee offers only $300, not the $300,000 that they need. Kate announces her plan to return to graduate school, but instead returns to Lawford after Paul's butler brings news that the Friars Club has agreed to help them.

Some time later, Paul brings Alex to Lawford. The college students, aided by name performers including comedian Groucho Marx, have staged Mr. Music for the benefit of several potential backers. Although the backers refuse to finance the show with Alex as producer, Thisbee furnishes a $300,000 check. Lorna, who realizes that she is more interested in money than in Paul, ends their engagement and asks Kate to return the ring. As Kate has rejected Jeff, who is back on a winning streak, she asks Paul if she can keep the ring, and when he consents, they become engaged.

== Cast ==
- Bing Crosby as Paul Merrick
- Nancy Olson as Katherine Holbrook
- Charles Coburn as Alex Conway
- Ruth Hussey as Lorna Marvis
- Robert Stack as Jefferson Blake
- Tom Ewell as "Cupcake" Haggerty
- Ida Moore as Aunt Amy
- Charles Kemper as Mr. Danforth
- Donald Woods as Tippy Carpenter
- Richard Haydn (aka Claud Curdle) as Jerome Thisbee
- Irving Bacon as Jewelry Salesman
- Norma Zimmer as Singer (uncredited)
- Dave Barbour as Guitarist (uncredited)

As themselves:

- Marge Champion
- Gower Champion
- Groucho Marx
- Dorothy Kirsten
- Peggy Lee
- The Merry Macs

== Soundtrack ==
- "Once More the Blue and White", sung by Bing Crosby
- "Milady", sung by students
- "And You'll Be Home", sung by Crosby and chorus, and again by chorus.
- "High on the List," sung by Crosby
- "Wouldn't It Be Funny", sung by Crosby
- "Accidents Will Happen", sung by Crosby, and again by Crosby and Dorothy Kirsten
- "Wasn't I There?", sung by Crosby
- "Life Is So Peculiar", sung by Crosby and Peggy Lee, also by the Merry Macs and again by Crosby and Groucho Marx
- "Mr. Music", sung by chorus

All of the songs were written by Jimmy Van Heusen (music) and Johnny Burke (lyrics).

Crosby recorded six of the songs for Decca Records, which were issued on an album titled Songs from Mr. Music. Crosby's songs were also included in the Bing's Hollywood series.

== Reception ==
In a contemporary review for The New York Times, critic Bosley Crowther called Mr. Music "one of the cheeriest and brightest of current films" and wrote: "There's no point in being coy about it: Bing has not been too fortunate In the general characteristics of his roles in his past three or four films. But in this light, romantic entertainment, based on Samson Raphaelson's play, 'Accent on Youth,' he acts the sort of droll, informal fellow that he himself happens to be. And since Bing's genial songsmith in this story takes more joyously to golfing than to work, it's the sort of job that our hero can well wrap his golf clubs around. ... 'Mr. Music' may not stack up with the best of the Crosby films, but it is certainly a contemporary achievement that the master may lean happily upon."

Variety editor Abel Green wrote: "Despite a contrived story, the ingredients are sufficiently well mixed to make 'Mr. Music' a box-office winner. ... The crooner-star does a good job in a role wherein he fits in easily, and might well have been a truly convincing characterization if not snarled by the cliche elements. By and large, however, Crosby makes the part breathe."
