= Ernest Cossart =

English-American actor

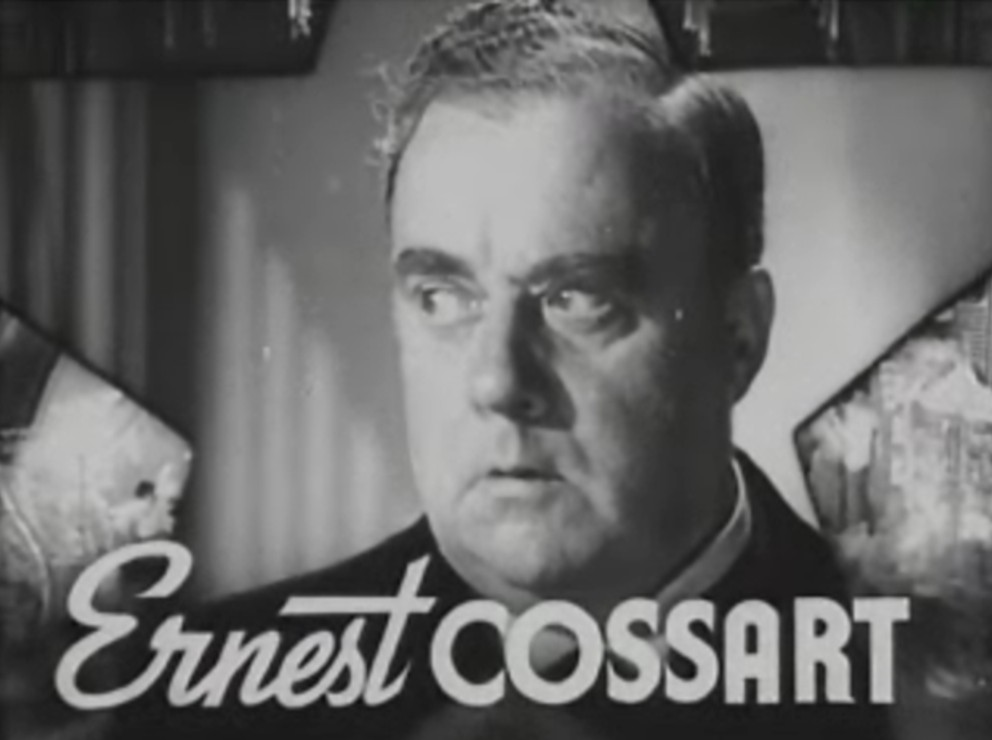
- from the trailer for the film The Great Ziegfeld (1936)
- Born: Emil Gottfried von Holst; 24 September 1876; Cheltenham, Gloucestershire, England, UK
- Died: 21 January 1951 (aged 74); New York City, US
- Years active: 1916–1950
- Spouse: Maude Davis (m. 1906)

Ernest Cossart (born Emil Gottfried von Holst, 24 September 1876 – 21 January 1951) was an English-American actor. After a stage career in England, he moved to the US, appearing on Broadway and all around the country. In the 1930s and 1940s, he appeared in films, specializing in playing butlers, valets, and similar roles, but playing a range of other parts.

== Life and career ==
Cossart was born in Cheltenham, Gloucestershire, the younger of the two children of Adolph von Holst (1846–1901), a professional musician, and his first wife, Clara (née Lediard; 1841–1882).

The elder child, Gustavus, later known as Gustav Holst, became a leading English composer. Emil attended Cheltenham Grammar School and Dean Close School, and then became a clerk in a wine company's office. When he decided to pursue an acting career, he took the stage name Ernest Cossart, appearing on stage in Britain before moving to the US in 1908, working in Broadway productions and all over the country. During the First World War, he served in the Canadian Expeditionary Force and was severely wounded. After the war, he appeared in musical comedy in the West End before returning to Broadway in 1919.

In the late 1920s, Cossart made a return to the London stage, acting with Alfred Lunt and Lynn Fontanne in a West End transfer of a Broadway success, Caprice. In 1932, he appeared as Colonel Tallboys in the world premiere of Bernard Shaw's Too True to Be Good, with Beatrice Lillie and Leo G. Carroll.

Cossart moved into acting in Hollywood films in the 1930s. He was often typecast as butlers; The New York Times said of him:

Butlers, the supreme gift of the British Empire to Hollywood and mystery fiction, are the specialty of Ernest Cossart. You have seen him buttling with frozen gravity and punctilio of bedtick vest in "Two for Tonight" and "Accent on Youth," and you will now see him as the correct gentleman's gentleman in "Angel," which Ernst Lubitsch has made with Marlene Dietrich and Herbert Marshall.

In Angel, Cossart and Edward Everett Horton as the servants were judged to have had the best of the film. In addition to such roles, Cossart played a range of different characters, appearing as Pa Monaghan with Ronald Reagan in Kings Row, and as Squire Brown in Tom Brown's School Days. In two films, he played Roman Catholic priests, one French and the other Irish-American.

During the Second World War, Cossart was a co-founder, with Sir Cedric Hardwicke, Basil Rathbone, and other expatriate actors, of a fund to help artists in distress in Britain.

Cossart died in New York at the age of 74, survived by his wife, the actress Maude Davis, and their daughter, the actress Valerie Cossart (1907–1994).

== Broadway roles ==
- Mary of Scotland (1933) as Lord Throgmorton

== Partial filmography ==
- The Strange Case of Mary Page (1916)
- The Scoundrel (1935) – Jimmy Clay
- Two for Tonight (1935) – Homps
- The Great Ziegfeld (1936) – Sidney
- Desire (1936) – Aristide Duvalle
- Palm Springs (1936) – Starkey
- Murder with Pictures (1936) – Stanley Redfield
- Three Smart Girls (1936) – Binns
- Champagne Waltz (1937) – Waiter
- As Good as Married (1937) – Quinn
- Angel (1937) – Wilton
- Bringing Up Baby (1938) – Joe
- Letter of Introduction (1938) – Andrews
- Zaza (1938) – Marchand
- Three Smart Girls Grow Up (1939) – Binns
- Never Say Die (1939) – Jeepers
- The Magnificent Fraud (1939) – Duval
- Lady of the Tropics (1939) – Father Antoine
- Tower of London (1939) – Tom Clink
- The Light That Failed (1939) – Beeton
- A Bill of Divorcement (1940) – Rev. Dr. Pumphrey
- Tom Brown's School Days (1940) – Squire Brown
- Kitty Foyle (1940) – Pop
- Skylark (1941) – Theodore
- Kings Row (1942) – Pa Monaghan
- Tonight and Every Night (1944) – Sam Royce
- The Girl of the Limberlost (1945)
- Cluny Brown (1946) – Syrett
- The Jolson Story (1946) – Father McGee
- Angel Street (play) (1950) – Inspector, Ford Theatre Hour, season 3, episode 4 (television)
