= Paul Raphaelson =

American photographer

Paul Raphaelson (born 1968, New York City), is an American artist best known for urban landscape photography.

In the early 1990s, after moving to Providence, Rhode Island, he started producing formally complex, often dark depictions of the urban, suburban, and industrial landscape. This work, which grew into the project titled "Wilderness" continued to evolve when Raphaelson moved to Brooklyn, New York in 1995. The work went unnoticed by the larger photography art world until it was discovered by Sandra S. Phillips of the San Francisco Museum of Modern Art. It later caught the attention of former Museum of Modern Art curator John Szarkowski, who acquired prints on behalf of private collections.

Raphaelson began working in color in 2005, continuing to explore urban spaces bordering the occupied and abandoned, and the residential and industrial.

In 2012 he brought a hand camera into the New York City Subway, photographing passengers through the reflections, obfuscations, and framing of the train windows.

In 2013 he was the last photographer granted permission to photograph the Domino Sugar Refinery in Williamsburg, Brooklyn, before its 2014 demolition and redevelopment. He expanded the project beyond ruin photographs, to encompass document, industrial history, and a philosophical exploration of the significance of ruin art in post-industrial popular culture. This project culminated in the 2017 book, Brooklyn's Sweet Ruin: Relics and Stories of the Domino Sugar Refinery.

Raphaelson's grandfather was the playwright and screenwriter Samson Raphaelson, who became a passionate amateur photographer and writer on photography in the last two decades of his life.

Raphaelson's ongoing projects include experiments with images and text, and photographic noise.

== Projects ==
- Sweet Ruin (2013-2014): Photographs and book exploring the final relics of the Domino Sugar Refinery.
- Sub/Culture (2012): A fragmented and disorienting look at the New York City Subway, through the reflections and obfuscations the train windows.
- Lost Spaces, Found Gardens (2005 to 2006): Color work exploring liminal and overgrown spaces, mostly in Bushwick, Brooklyn.
- Wilderness (1994-2003): Black and white large format urban landscape work.
- Southwest (1988- ): An ongoing exploration of the old and new in the American Southwest.
- Chicago (1988-1990): Small camera urban landscapes and street pictures.

== Exhibitions ==
- Sweet Ruin, solo exhibit, Front Room Gallery, NYC, 2017
- Summer Sampler, group exhibit, Front Room Gallery, NYC, 2017
- Shifting Perspectives, group exhibit, Brooklyn Historical Society DUMBO, 2017
- Coda, group exhibit, Front Room Gallery, Brooklyn, 2017
- Beyond Ruin Porn, group exhibit, Front Room Gallery, Brooklyn, 2016
- Street Shots NYC, group exhibit, South Street Seaport Museum, NYC, 2013
- Brooklyn Utopias?, group exhibit, Brooklyn Historical Society, 2009 - 2010
- Lost Spaces, Found Gardens, individual exhibit, Brooklyn Public Library, 2009
- Ten Years Under The Manhattan Bridge, individual exhibit, Brooklyn Public Library, 2008
- Brooklynature, juried exhibit, St. Joseph's College, Brooklyn, 2007
- Environment: Place, juried exhibit, Photomedia Center.org, 2005
- Emotional Distance, group exhibit, Gallery Sink, Denver, 2002
- Off The Highway, group exhibit, Gallery Sink, Denver, 2001
- Paul Raphaelson, individual exhibit, Monographs, Ltd., New York, 2000
- Urban Interpretations, group exhibit, Colorado College, Colorado Springs, 1999
- Off the Highway, group exhibit, David Floria Gallery, Aspen, Colorado, 1996
- Wilderness, individual exhibit, Gallery One, Providence, 1995
- Off the Highway, group exhibit, Robin Rule Modern and Contemporary, Denver, 1995

== Works ==
- Brooklyn's Sweet Ruin: Relics and Stories of the Domino Sugar Refinery (Schiffer Publishing, 2017)
