= Bedtime Worries =

1933 film

- Directed by: Robert F. McGowan
- Produced by: Robert F. McGowan; Hal Roach
- Starring: George McFarland; Matthew Beard; Tommy Bond; Jerry Tucker; Georgie Billings; Pete the Pup; Emerson Treacy; Gay Seabrook; Harry Bernard; Billy Bletcher; Lee Phelps; Frank Terry
- Cinematography: Hap Depew
- Edited by: William H. Terhune
- Music by: Leroy Shield; Marvin Hatley
- Distributed by: MGM
- Release date: September 9, 1933
- Running time: 20:05
- Country: United States
- Language: English

Bedtime Worries is a 1933 Our Gang short comedy film directed by Robert F. McGowan. It was the 124th Our Gang short to be released.

== Plot ==
On the day he is promoted to head clerk (or "head cluck," as Spanky mistakenly puts it), Spanky's father (Emerson Treacy) declares that it is time Spanky stopped sleeping in his parents' room and go to bed in his own room. Earlier, the gang asked Spanky if they could board Pete, their dog. Spanky could not do that. During his first night alone, Spanky envisions all sorts of imaginary horrors, from a bat (actually a moth) to "the boogeyman."

Thus, when a burglar (Harry Bernard) climbs into Spanky's window, the boy's dozing parents fail to believe his story. Passing himself off as Santa Claus, the burglar attempts to steal everything that is not nailed down. The orphaned gang stop at Spanky's house to stay. He tells them Santa was visiting and when Stymie sees him, he realizes that this man is a burglar. The gang comes to the rescue and tackle down the burglar and the police arrive and take the burglar away.

== Production notes ==
With Bobby Hutchins, Dickie Moore and Dorothy DeBorba having departed after the previous film (Mush and Milk), Spanky is left to carry the next two films. New Our Gang members would not be introduced until 1934

Bedtime Worries was the first film since 1930 to employ only a minimal music score, relying more on dialogue than visual humor.

== Cast ==
=== The Gang ===
- George McFarland as Spanky
- Matthew Beard as Stymie
- Tommy Bond as Tommy
- Jerry Tucker as Jerry
- Georgie Billings as Georgie
- Pete the Pup as Himself

=== Additional cast ===
- Emerson Treacy as Emerson, Spanky's father
- Gay Seabrook as Gay, Spanky's mother
- Harry Bernard as The burglar
- Billy Bletcher as Radio Voice (voice)
- Lee Phelps as Officer
- Frank Terry as Radio voice (voice)
- David Sharpe as Gay (double)

== See also ==
- Our Gang filmography
