= Samson Raphaelson =

American writer (1894–1983)

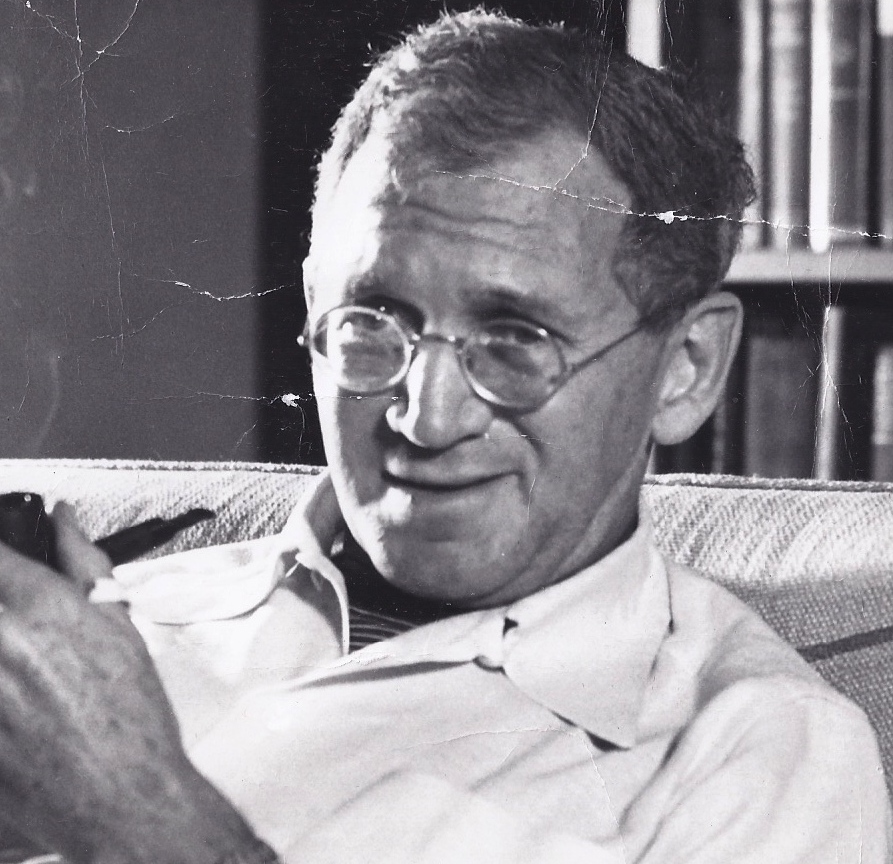
- Born: March 30, 1894; New York City, U.S.
- Died: July 16, 1983 (aged 89); New York City, U.S.
- Education: University of Illinois at Urbana-Champaign
- Occupations: Playwright; novelist; screenwriter; reporter
- Years active: 1925–1965
- Spouse: Dorothy Wegman Raphaelson (m. 1927)
- Children: 2
- Relatives: Bob Rafelson (nephew); Paul Raphaelson (grandson)

Samson Raphaelson (March 30, 1894 – July 16, 1983) was an American playwright, screenwriter and fiction writer.

While working as an advertising executive in New York, he wrote a short story based on the early life of Al Jolson, called The Day of Atonement, which he then converted into a 1925 play, The Jazz Singer. In 1927 this would become the first talking picture, with Jolson its star. He then worked as a screenwriter with Ernst Lubitsch on sophisticated comedies such as Trouble in Paradise, The Shop Around the Corner, and Heaven Can Wait and with Alfred Hitchcock on Suspicion. His short stories appeared in The Saturday Evening Post and other leading magazines, and he taught creative writing at the University of Illinois.

== Career on Broadway ==
Raphaelson was born to a Jewish family in New York, the son of Anna (Marks) and Ralph Raphaelson. After graduating from the University of Illinois, he lived for varying periods in Chicago, San Francisco, and New York, working as a journalist and an advertising writer, while trying to establish himself as writer of short stories. He had become a successful advertising executive in New York when his secretary encouraged him to convert his short story “The Day of Atonement” into a play. Showing him the manuscript of a play, she pointed out how few words were on each page, adding that he had dictated more than that in two hours the previous afternoon. She volunteered to take dictation over the weekend. The result, by Sunday evening, was a complete draft of The Jazz Singer.

Raphaelson's second play, Young Love, was banned in Boston when authorities found it too racy. It starred Dorothy Gish, one of the leading actresses of the day.

Three of his subsequent six plays produced on Broadway were chosen for publication in the annual Ten Best Plays of the Season, compiled by Burns Mantle, the widely read critic of the New York Daily News, at the time the largest circulation daily in the U.S. They were Accent On Youth (1934), Skylark (1939) and Jason (1941).

Accent On Youth was a critical and popular success both on Broadway and in London's West End, where the young Greer Garson played the leading role. Skylark, another substantial hit, starred Gertrude Lawrence. Jason was less successful commercially but won high praise from the New York critics. One called it “the best play of the season” and added that it contained “some of the finest writing to grace a stage in several years.” Another, commenting on one main character inspired by the colorful writer William Saroyan, wrote: “Many authors have tried to put into their plays characters that possess the picturesque qualities attributed to Saroyan, but Mr. Raphaelson is the first to do the thing successfully.”

== Other writing and activities ==
In 1948, Raphaelson taught a master class in “creative writing with an emphasis on the drama” at the University of Illinois. He recorded the experience in a book, The Human Nature of Playwriting. The introduction expresses Raphaelson's deep regard for language so visible in his writing:

This course does not aim directly to teach writing. Whether you write or not after you finish school means nothing to me as a teacher. In fact, I don’t think it is important from any viewpoint. But whether you live or not is important; and how you live. You may become businessmen or women, office workers, farmers, or wives, and as such you will be, whether you know it or not, deeply related to the culture of your age. That culture is largely expressed by creative writers through the written word. And if from this course you get a notion of how that written word comes into being, of the connection between a writer and his own life and between his life and all lives, then this course will be successful indeed.

In the 1940s many Raphaelson short stories appeared in Ladies Home Journal, Good Housekeeping, and The Saturday Evening Post, in that period the nation's highest-paying publishers of short fiction.

In later years, as a result of Raphaelson's newly found passion for photography, he wrote a variety of articles for the leading photographic magazines. Some of his thousands of photos ran in the magazines, both as accompaniments to his articles and independent of them.

In 1983, the University of Wisconsin Press published Three Screen Comedies by Samson Raphaelson with an introduction by Pauline Kael. All directed by Lubitsch, the three were Trouble in Paradise, Heaven Can Wait, and Raphaelson's favorite, The Shop Around the Corner; this last had starred James Stewart and Margaret Sullavan, and Pauline Kael, the eminent film critic of The New Yorker, called it “as close to perfection as a movie made by mortals is ever likely to be; it couldn’t be the airy wonder it was without the structure Raphaelson built into it.” (The story was remade in 1998 as You've Got Mail, with Tom Hanks and Meg Ryan.) Of his screenplays in general, Kael declared:

Raphaelson took the giddiest inspirations and then polished his dialogue until it had the gleam of appliquéd butterfly wings on a Ziegfeld girl’s toque, but the skeletal strength of his screenplays was what made it possible for the ideas and the words to take flight.

Three Screen Comedies also included a reprint of Freundschaft, Raphaelson's wry and affectionate reflection on his working relationship with Lubitsch that had originally appeared in The New Yorker in 1982.

In 1977, Raphaelson received the Laurel Award for lifetime achievement in screenwriting from the Writers Guild of America.

In an interview series entitled "Creativity with Bill Moyers," an episode that aired in 1982 profiled Raphaelson's career and included an extended interview with him by Moyers. This program is among the extras included on the Criterion Collection DVD of "Heaven Can Wait."

In his seventies and early eighties Raphaelson became an adjunct professor at Columbia University in New York, where he taught a course in screenwriting. In 1976 Columbia awarded him an honorary degree.

Raphaelson died on July 16, 1983, at the age of eighty-nine.

== Family ==
His first wife was Rayna Simon from Chicago, who also studied at the University of Illinois. She became a legendary figure, Rayna Prohme, thanks to Vincent Sheean's bestselling book Personal History in the 1930s.

Raphaelson was married for 56 years to Dorothy Wegman, known to friends and family as Dorshka. The name was given to her by her friend Marion Benda, a fellow dancer in the Ziegfeld Follies in the early 1920s. Dorshka Raphaelson published two novels: Glorified, an account of her life in the Follies, and Morning Song, a highly praised story about growing up in New York's Washington Heights.

Raphaelson's son, Joel (1928–2021), became a senior ad executive and close associate of advertising legend David Ogilvy. Joel edited The Unpublished David Ogilvy: His Secrets of Management, Creativity, and Success - from Private Papers and Public Fulminations, prized reading for advertising professionals. Joel also co-wrote (with Kenneth Roman) Writing that Works. Photographer Paul Raphaelson is Joel's son.

Samson's daughter, Naomi (1930–2009), was a newspaper reporter and columnist in Lancaster, Pennsylvania. Samson's much-younger first cousin, once removed, Bob Rafelson, sometimes jokingly referred to by him as his nephew, directed several films from the 1960s through the 2000s, including Five Easy Pieces.

Samson Raphaelson died in July 1983, at the age of 89. Dorshka Raphaelson died in November 2005, just 22 days short of her 101st birthday. At her death The New York Times reported that she had been one of the last two living Ziegfeld girls.

== Filmography ==
Year	Title
1931	The Magnificent Lie
1931	The Smiling Lieutenant
1932	Broken Lullaby
1932	One Hour With You
1932	Trouble In Paradise
1934	Caravan
1934	The Merry Widow
1934	The Queen's Affair
1934	Servants' Entrance
1935	Ladies Love Danger
1935	Dressed to Thrill
1937	The Last of Mrs. Cheyney
1937	Angel
1940	The Shop Around the Corner
1941	Skylark
1941	Suspicion
1943	Heaven Can Wait
1946	The Harvey Girls
1946	Ziegfeld Follies
1947	Green Dolphin Street
1948	That Lady in Ermine
1949	In the Good Old Summertime
1953	Main Street to Broadway

== Collected plays ==
- The Jazz Singer (1925)
- Young Love
- The Wooden Slipper
- Accent on Youth (1934)
- Skylark (1939)
- Jason (1941)
- The Perfect Marriage (1944)
- Hilda Crane (1950)
- Bannerline (1951)
