= Florence Wagner =

American screenwriter

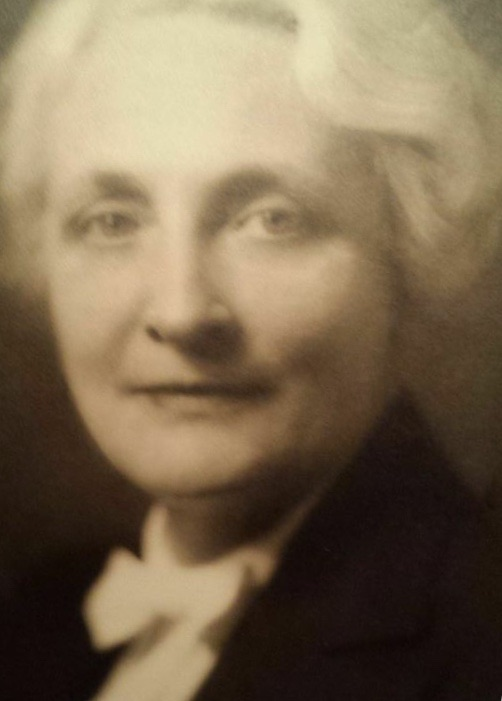
- Born: Florence Mason Welch; January 23, 1883; Topeka, Kansas, US
- Died: October 9, 1971 (aged 88); La Jolla, California, US
- Occupations: Screenwriter, suffragist, journalist
- Spouse(s): Rob Wagner; James Breese

Florence Wagner (née Welch) was an American screenwriter and journalist.

== Biography ==
Born and raised in Topeka, Kansas, Florence embarked on a career as a journalist, working at The Topeka Daily Herald and The Topeka Daily Capital as a European correspondent, among other beats.

She moved to Los Angeles and began teaching at Polytechnic High School, eventually meeting artist and writer Rob Wagner, whom she married in 1914. The pair worked on a number of socialist projects together before becoming jointly enamoured with film.

Florence wrote two films—Among the Missing and Men of the Night—and contributed to a third, Strangers of the Evening. Meanwhile, Rob edited several films and wrote about the industry for The Saturday Evening Post and Collier's, among other publications.

In 1929, they founded Rob Wagner's Script, a liberal magazine renowned for publishing work by writers like Ray Bradbury and featuring contributions by film industry insiders like Charlie Chaplin, Cecil B. deMille, and Walt Disney. They continued running it together until Rob's death in 1942; Florence ended up selling it in 1947.

In 1948, she married aviator and inventor James Breese, a longtime friend; the pair lived in New Mexico together for a time.

== Selected filmography ==
- Among the Missing (1934)
- Strangers of the Evening (1932)
- Men of the Night (1926)
