= Francis Sayles =

American actor (1891–1944)

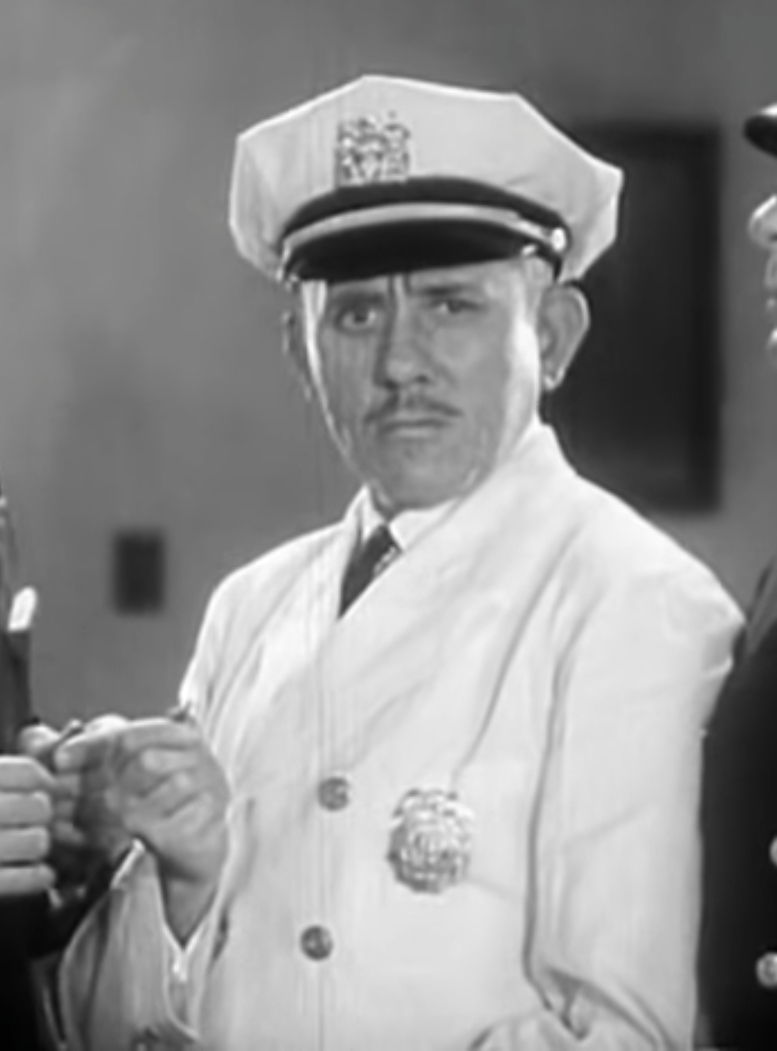
- Sayles in Midnight Phantom (1935)
- Born: November 22, 1891; Buffalo, New York City, U.S.
- Died: March 19, 1944 (aged 52); Los Angeles, California, U.S.
- Occupation: Actor
- Years active: 1932–1944

Francis Sayles (November 22, 1891 – March 19, 1944) was an American character actor at the beginning of the sound film era. In the short dozen years of his career he appeared in over 100 films, most of them features. While he was normally cast in small uncredited parts, he was occasionally cast in featured roles, as in the role of Dickman in the 1934 film, One in a Million, starring Dorothy Wilson and Charles Starrett.

== Life and career ==
Sayles was born on November 22, 1891, in Buffalo, New York. His film debut occurred in a small role of a detective in Strangers of the Evening (1932), starring ZaSu Pitts. Other notable films in which Sayles appears include: the featured role of Charlie Blaine in 1932's Blonde Venus, starring Marlene Dietrich and Cary Grant; a small role in The Gay Deception (1935), starring Francis Lederer and Frances Dee; a bit part as a waiter in the 1936 romantic comedy More Than a Secretary, starring Jean Arthur, George Brent, and Lionel Stander; the featured role of Charlie in Archie Mayo's 1937 drama Black Legion, starring Humphrey Bogart; as Detective William Jones in the 1938 western The Purple Vigilantes, starring Robert Livingston, Ray Corrigan, and Max Terhune; an uncredited role in Michael Curtiz' 1939 western, Dodge City, starring Errol Flynn and Olivia de Havilland; as a politician in Orson Welles' 1941 classic, Citizen Kane; as a taxi driver in the 1943 Howard Hawks' romantic comedy, Ball of Fire (1942), starring Gary Cooper and Barbara Stanwyck; again as a cab driver in the 1943 biopic, The Pride of the Yankees, starring Gary Cooper and Teresa Wright; and the 1944 biography The Adventures of Mark Twain, starring Fredric March and Alexis Smith. Sayles had a small role of an elevator operator in the 1944 film, Casanova Brown, again starring Cooper and Wright. It was his final film, he died on March 19, 1944, while the film was still in production. It was released later that year in August.

== Filmography ==
(Per AFI database)

- Blonde Venus (1932)
- Strangers of the Evening (1932)
- False Faces (1932)
- The Texas Bad Man (1932)
- College Rhythm (1934)
- The Big Shakedown (1934)
- One in a Million (1934)
- Home on the Range (1934)
- One Hour Late (1934)
- Hands Across the Table (1935)
- Love Me Forever (1935)
- Midnight Phantom (1935)
- The Gay Deception (1935)
- Big Brown Eyes (1936)
- Florida Special (1936)
- Love Begins at 20 (1936)
- Alibi for Murder (1936)
- The Music Goes 'Round (1936)
- More Than a Secretary (1936)
- Yours for the Asking (1936)
- Black Legion (1937) as Charlie
- The Plainsman (1937)
- Wells Fargo (1937)
- Make Way for Tomorrow (1937)
- 45 Fathers (1937)
- The Shadow (1937)
- Easy Living (1937)
- Alcatraz Island (1937)
- The Man in Blue (1937)
- Sophie Lang Goes West (1937)
- Partners in Crime (1937) (credited as Francis H. Sayles)
- Sing and Be Happy (1937)
- The Hit Parade (1937)
- It Happened in Hollywood (1937)
- Trapped (1937)
- I Promise to Pay (1937)
- Broadway Musketeers (1938)
- Wives Under Suspicion (1938)
- Swing That Cheer (1938)
- Secrets of a Nurse (1938)
- The Purple Vigilantes (1938)
- Down on the Farm (1938)
- Newsboys' Home (1938)
- Man of Conquest (1939)
- King of the Underworld (1939) (?)
- Dodge City (1939)
- The Big Guy (1939)
- Hollywood Cavalcade (1939)
- Riders of Black River (1939)
- Devil's Island (1939)
- For Love or Money (1939)
- Union Pacific (1939)
- Laugh It Off (1939)
- Riders of Pasco Basin (1940)
- Private Affairs (1940)
- One Crowded Night (1940)
- Henry Aldrich for President (1941) (credited as Francis H. Sayles)
- Man Made Monster (1941)
- Mr. District Attorney in the Carter Case (1941)
- Pacific Blackout (1941)
- Public Enemies (1941)
- Rags to Riches (1941)
- The Son of Davy Crockett (1941)
- Thunder Over the Prairie (1941)
- Thundering Hoofs (1941)
- World Premiere (1941)
- Citizen Kane (1941) as Politician (uncredited)
- Ball of Fire (1941)
- Secrets of the Underground (1942)
- Wild Bill Hickok Rides (1942)
- Stagecoach Express (1942)
- Sunset on the Desert (1942)
- North of the Rockies (1942)
- Alias Boston Blackie (1942)
- The Mystery of Marie Roget (1942)
- Take a Letter, Darling (1942)
- Dr. Broadway (1942)
- Sweater Girl (1942)
- Thundering Hoofs (1942)
- Somewhere I'll Find You (1942) as Pearcley (voice) (uncredited)
- The Glass Key (1942)
- Unseen Enemy (1942)
- Strictly in the Groove (1942)
- Coney Island (1943)
- Crazy House (1943)
- Fighting Frontier (1943)
- The Good Fellows (1943)
- Honeymoon Lodge (1943)
- Moonlight in Vermont (1943)
- The Pride of the Yankees (1943) as Cab Driver (uncredited)
- Hi, Good Lookin'! (1944)
- Casanova Brown (1944)
- Ministry of Fear (1944)
- Shine on Harvest Moon (1944)
- Sing a Jingle (1944)
- The Adventures of Mark Twain (1944)
