= His Nibs =

His Nibs

- May refer to: As in the novel (His Nibs) by Alan L Corbett, the Devil/Lucifer.
- Cribbage, a phrase used for a particular draw
- His Nibs (film), a 1921 comedy film
