= Men of the Night =

Men of the Night may refer to:

- Men of the Night (1926 film), American silent crime directed by Albert S. Rogell
- Men of the Night (1934 film), American drama written and directed by Lambert Hillyer
