= Speed to Spare =

Speed to Spare may refer to:

- Speed to Spare (1937 film)
- Speed to Spare (1948 film)
