= Charles Sellon =

American actor (1870–1937)

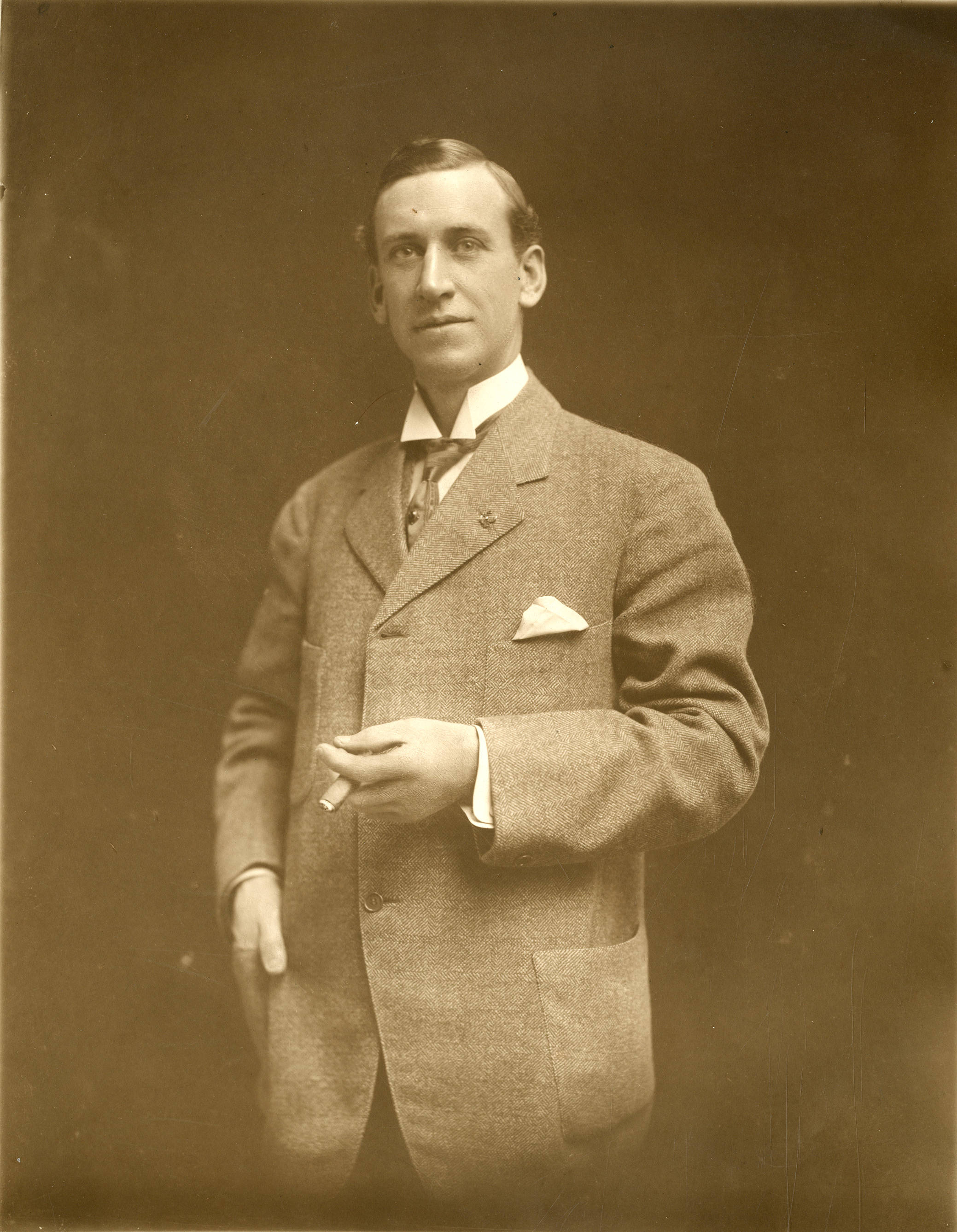
- Born: August 24, 1870; Boston, Massachusetts, U.S.
- Died: June 26, 1937 (aged 66); La Crescenta, California, U.S.
- Resting place: Valhalla Memorial Park Cemetery
- Occupation: Actor
- Years active: 1901–1935
- Spouse: Florence E. Willis (1896-1937, his death)
- Children: 1

Charles A. Sellon (August 24, 1870 – June 26, 1937) was an American stage and film actor.

Sellon appeared in more than 100 films and stage acts between 1901 and 1935. He played the blind Mr. Muckle in W. C. Fields' comedy It's a Gift (1934) and the wheelchair-using uncle in Bright Eyes (1934) with Shirley Temple. His other films included The Mighty, The Painted Desert, and Tracked in the Snow Country.

On Broadway, Sellon appeared in The Challenge (1919), Roads of Destiny (1918), The Pawn (1917), and The Cat and the Fiddle (1907).

Sellon was married to Florence E. Willis from 1896 until his death. They had one child together: a son, Robert Charles Sellon.

== Partial filmography ==
- The Bad Man (1923)
- South Sea Love (1923)
- Flowing Gold (1924)
- Merton of the Movies (1924)
- Sundown (1924)
- The Monster (1925)
- Private Affairs (1925)
- The Lucky Devil (1925)
- The Calgary Stampede (1925)
- The Night Ship (1925)
- High Steppers (1926)
- The Cow's Kimona (1926)
- Racing Blood (1926)
- The Speeding Venus (1926)
- Easy Pickings (1927)
- The Mysterious Rider (1927)
- The Prairie King (1927)
- The Valley of the Giants (1927)
- Love Me and the World Is Mine (1928)
- Feel My Pulse (1928)
- Something Always Happens (1928)
- Easy Come, Easy Go (1928)
- What a Night! (1928)
- The Gamblers (1929)
- The Man and the Moment (1929)
- Bulldog Drummond (1929)
- Big News (1929)
- The Saturday Night Kid (1929)
- The Vagabond Lover (1929)
- Burning Up (1930)
- Under a Texas Moon (1930)
- Let's Go Native (1930)
- Borrowed Wives (1930)
- For the Love o' Lil (1930)
- Big Money (1930)
- Tom Sawyer (1930)
- The Painted Desert (1931)
- Behind Office Doors (1931)
- Laugh and Get Rich (1931)
- Penrod and Sam (1931)
- The Age for Love (1931)
- The Drifter (1932)
- The Dark Horse (1932)
- Make Me a Star (1932)
- I Am a Fugitive from a Chain Gang (1932)
- Speed Madness (1932)
- As the Devil Commands (1932)
- Hoop-La (1933) (uncredited)
- Baby Face (1933) (uncredited)
- Employees' Entrance (1933)
- Ready for Love (1934)
- It's a Gift (1934)
- Bright Eyes (1934)
- The Casino Murder Case (1935)
- Life Begins at 40 (1935)
- Diamond Jim (1935)
- In Old Kentucky (1935)
