= The Age of Consent (film) =

1932 film directed by Gregory La Cava

- Directed by: Gregory La Cava
- Screenplay by: Sarah Y. Mason; Francis Cockrell
- Based on: Cross Roads; 1929 play by Martin Flavin
- Produced by: Pandro S. Berman; David O. Selznick
- Starring: Dorothy Wilson; Arline Judge; Richard Cromwell
- Cinematography: J. Roy Hunt
- Edited by: Jack Kitchin
- Distributed by: RKO Radio Pictures
- Release date: August 19, 1932
- Running time: 63 minutes
- Country: United States
- Language: English
- Budget: $125,000

The Age of Consent is a 1932 American pre-Code drama film directed by Gregory La Cava. The film stars Richard Cromwell as a young man who becomes involved with a waitress of a seedy restaurant, co-starring Dorothy Wilson and Arline Judge.

== Plot ==
Mike Harvey and Betty Cameron are college sweethearts at a New York college. They are so anxious to consummate their relationship that Mike suggests that the two of them quit college, get married and move to California where a friend of his has offered him a job. Both Mike's mentor, Professor Matthews, and Betty talk him out of it. In a funk, Mike goes to the local diner.

Dora is a waitress who has had a crush on Mike and suggests that he walk her home after her late shift. Arriving at her house, she invites him in. Once in the house she lets him know that her father is working the night shift, offers Mike some of the liquor her father keeps hidden and turn on the music. The drunken couple begin kissing and end up having sex. They wake up the next morning as Dora is asking Mike if he's sorry for what happened. At that moment Dora's father comes in. He sees the rumpled condition of the couple, hears Dora's words and immediately has Mike arrested for corrupting the morals of a minor.

Matthews bails Mike out and when they meet with Dora and her father in the District Attorney's office, Mr Swales presents Mike with two options: marry Dora or have charges brought against him. Despite Professor Matthews attempts to intervene, Dora's father insists that Mike marry his daughter and Mike finally acquiesces. The plan is made for them to get married that night and leave immediately for California. Mike goes to see Betty who has changed her mind and wants to leave school right away to get married. Mike tells her that he has to marry someone and why, she becomes distraught and suggests they run away and get married right away. He tells her that he has to do the right thing by Dora and leaves. Betty is visibly upset and later Duke Galloway, a classmate of Mike and Betty's offers to take her for a ride to help cheer her up.

Mike arrives at Dora's house. Her father lets him know that the preacher is on the way. Dora comes downstairs in a white suit for the wedding and so that she can leave with Mike right away. Professor Matthews is standing up for Mike. Before the preacher can arrive, Professor Matthews is summoned to the hospital and he takes Mike with him with Dora and her father following behind.

When they arrive at the hospital they find out that Duke has had a bad car accident. Betty is badly injured but Duke dies from his injuries at the hospital. Dora sees Mike and Betty and tells her father that she refuses to marry Mike because she can see how much he and Betty love each other.

The last scene shows a now married Mike and Betty on the train to California.

== Cast ==
- Dorothy Wilson as Betty Cameron
- Arline Judge as Dora Swale
- Richard Cromwell as Michael (Mike) Harvey
- Eric Linden as Duke Galloway
- John Halliday as Professor David Matthews
- Aileen Pringle as Barbara
- Reginald Barlow as Mr. Swale
