= Among the Missing (film) =

1934 film directed by Albert S. Rogell

- Directed by: Albert S. Rogell
- Written by: Herbert Asbury; Fred Niblo Jr. Florence Wagner
- Produced by: Sid Rogell
- Starring: Richard Cromwell; Henrietta Crosman; Billie Seward
- Cinematography: Joseph H. August
- Edited by: John Rawlins
- Production company: Columbia Pictures
- Distributed by: Columbia Pictures
- Release date: September 25, 1934
- Running time: 62 minutes
- Country: United States
- Language: English

Among the Missing is a 1934 American drama film directed by Albert S. Rogell and starring Richard Cromwell, Henrietta Crosman and Billie Seward. It was produced and distributed by Columbia Pictures.

== Plot ==
Two young jewel thieves, Tommy and Gordon, hide their jewels with their slightly crazy Aunt Martha to avoid the police. They trick her into helping them sell the jewels. She moves in with the boys and learns of their criminal activities. She helps reform Tommy, who is falling in love with Judy, a local girl. When Tommy takes one last job, Aunt Martha must bail him out and save his blossoming romance with Judy.

== Cast ==
- Richard Cromwell as Tommy aka The Kid
- Henrietta Crosman as Aunt Martha Abbott
- Billie Seward as Judy
- Arthur Hohl as Gordon
- Ivan F. Simpson as Smeed
- Ben Taggart as Police Officer Flannagan
- Wade Boteler as Detective Rogers
- Harry C. Bradley as Alvin Abbott
- Claire Du Brey as Mrs. Alvin Abbott
- Douglas Cosgrove as Police Captain Drake
- Paul Hurst as Police Capt. Bill Connors
- Joseph Crehan as Detective O'Malley
- George Guhl as Detective Jones
- Kathrin Clare Ward as Mrs. Bull - Scrubwoman
- Vessie Farrell as Mrs. Hunter - Scrubwoman
- John M. Sullivan as Judge
- Fred Kelsey as Police Sgt. Murphy
- Gladys Gale as Mrs. Randall
- Cyril Thornton as Brennan
- Lee Phelps as Detective Gaynor
- Delmar Watson as First Boy
- Bobby Caldwell as Second Boy
- Tom McGuire as Detective
- Lew Meehan as Detective
- Lee Shumway as Detective
- Billy Sullivan as Court Clerk
- Blanche Payson as Police Matron
- Jack Mower as Police Radio Broadcaster

== Bibliography ==
- Matlin, Leonard. Turner Classic Movies Presents Leonard Maltin's Classic Movie Guide: From the Silent Era Through 1965: Third Edition. Penguin, 2015.
- Rainey, Buck. Sweethearts of the Sage: Biographies and Filmographies of 258 actresses appearing in Western movies. McFarland & Company, 1992.
