= Tol'able David (1930 film) =

1930 film

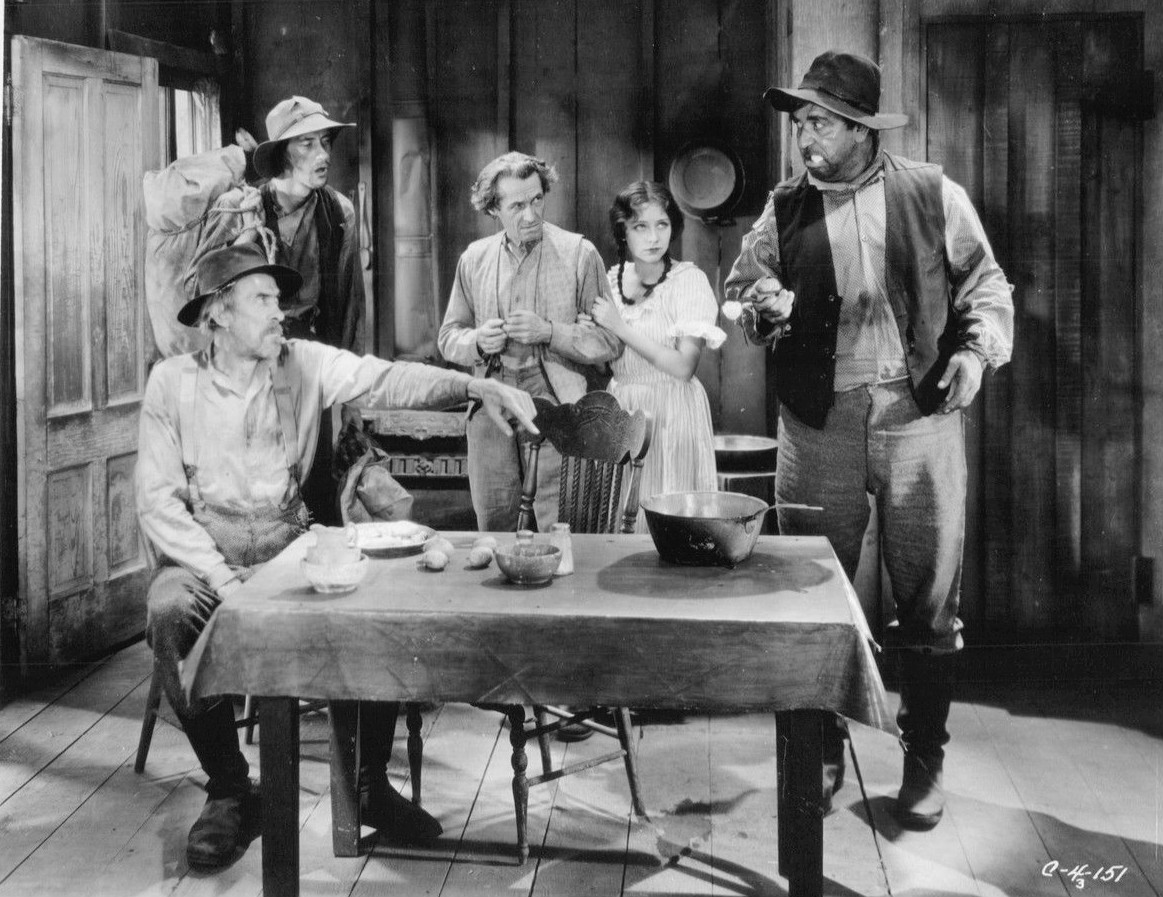
- Scene from the film
- Directed by: John G. Blystone
- Written by: Benjamin Glazer (screenplay)
- Based on: "Tol'able David" by Joseph Hergesheimer
- Produced by: Harry Cohn
- Starring: Richard Cromwell; Noah Beery
- Cinematography: Ted Tetzlaff
- Edited by: Glen Wheeler
- Distributed by: Columbia Pictures
- Release date: November 15, 1930
- Running time: 65 minutes
- Country: United States
- Language: English

Tol'able David is a 1930 American pre-Code drama film directed by John G. Blystone and produced and released by Columbia Pictures. It is a remake of the 1921 silent film Tol'able David, which starred Richard Barthelmess and Ernest Torrence.

The Columbia film stars Richard Cromwell in the Barthelmess part after he won an audition over thousands of hopefuls and Harry Cohn gave him his screen name and a $75/week contract.

It is preserved in the Library of Congress.

== Cast ==
- Richard Cromwell as David Kinemon
- Noah Beery as Luke Hatburn
- Joan Peers as Esther Hatburn
- Henry B. Walthall as Amos Hatburn
- Tom Keene as Alan Kinemon
- Edmund Breese as Hunter Kinemon
- Barbara Bedford as Rose Kinemon
- Helen Ware as Mrs. Kinemon
- Harlan Knight as Iska Hatburn
- John Carradine as Buzzard Hatburn (*billed as Peter Richmond)
