= Stranger in Town (1931 film) =

1931 film

- Directed by: Erle C. Kenton
- Written by: Carl Erickson
- Screenplay by: Harvey Thew
- Produced by: Lucien Hubbard
- Starring: Charles "Chic" Sale; Ann Dvorak
- Cinematography: Dev Jennings
- Music by: Leo F. Forbstein; W. Franke Harling
- Distributed by: Warner Bros. Pictures
- Release date: August 6, 1931
- Running time: 65 minutes
- Country: United States
- Language: English

Stranger in Town is a 1931 American pre-Code drama film directed by Erle C. Kenton and starring Charles "Chic" Sale and Ann Dvorak.

== Cast ==
- Charles "Chic" Sale - Ulysses Crickle
- Ann Dvorak - Marian Crickle
- David Manners - Jerry Fleming
- Noah Beery Sr. - J.B. Hilliker
- Raymond Hatton - Elmer
- Lyle Talbot - Brice
