= Baby Face Morgan =

1942 film

- Original film poster
- Directed by: Arthur Dreifuss
- Written by: Jack Rubin; Oscar Brodney
- Screenplay by: Edward Dein; Jack Rubin
- Produced by: Leon Fromkess (executive producer); Jack Schwarz
- Starring: Mary Carlisle; Richard Cromwell; Chick Chandler
- Cinematography: Arthur Reed
- Edited by: Dan Miller
- Music by: Leo Erdody
- Distributed by: Producers Releasing Corporation
- Release date: September 15, 1942
- Running time: 63 minutes
- Country: United States
- Language: English

Baby Face Morgan is a 1942 American crime comedy thriller film directed by Arthur Dreifuss. It stars Mary Carlisle and Richard Cromwell.

The film was a notable "B" effort for PRC (Producers Releasing Corporation). Jack Schwarz was producer, and Leon Fromkess was listed as "in charge of production".

== Plot ==
With America engaged in fighting World War II, the traditional gangsters have fallen on tough times. 'Doc' Rogers (Robert Armstrong) summons criminals from around the nation for a summit. He proposes that the only way they can regain their former wealth and influence is by uniting under a strong leader. As the now deceased Mob Boss "Big Morgan" was their greatest leader, Rogers, his lieutenant, decides to bring in Morgan's son Edward 'Baby Face' Morgan (Richard Cromwell) to lead the gangsters. Rogers sends two of his loyal but dim-witted henchmen to see whether Edward has the capabilities of his father, and if he does, to bring him back.

Edward, who never knew his father or the life he led, is a small-town delivery boy. The two henchmen misinterpret his account of taking collections and leaving pineapples as proof he uses hand grenades to support his extortion racket and brings him back to Doc. Doc immediately sees that Edward and his cousin Ollie (Chick Chandler) are naive youngsters but decides to use Edward's name as a unifying element. However, Doc ensures that the gangsters never meet Edward nor does Edward meet the criminals or know what business they are in. Doc sets Edward and Ollie up as President and Vice President of one of Big Morgan's shelf corporations called the Acme Protection Agency where the profits of the criminals' extortion rackets are deposited. Edward and Ollie believe they are running an insurance company staffed with one of Doc's henchmen, his moll and an office full of rabbits that the henchman wants to use to make a fur coat for his moll. The criminals are told that Big Morgan's brutal son "Baby Face" is running things and they believe Doc's stories of his cruelty.

Doc believes the Federal authorities are occupied with Japanese-Americans and the German American Bund so they will have a free run. The gangsters begin to extort trucking companies and all pay up, except one led by Virginia (Mary Carlisle) who throws the gangster out of her office. They plan revenge by destroying one of her trucks on its run. When Virginia's courage makes the newspapers, Ollie decides that their insurance company can sell policies to the victims of "Baby Face Morgan" though Edward does not realise that he is Baby Face. When Virginia and Edward meet they fall in love. Virginia buys a large policy, the gangsters destroy the truck and Edward pays off the next day. Edward's prompt payment leads all the other trucking companies to purchase policies from Acme Protection and challenge the gangsters to destroy their old vehicles when they refuse to pay the extortion.

It does not take long before the Mob comes looking for their profits that have been recycled back to the trucking companies. "Baby Face" takes a crash course in acting as a tough guy.

== Cast ==
- Mary Carlisle as Virginia Clark
- Richard Cromwell as Edward 'Baby Face' Morgan
- Robert Armstrong as 'Doc' Rogers
- Chick Chandler as Oliver Harrison
- Warren Hymer as Wise Willie
- Charles Judels as 'Deacon' Davis
- Vince Barnett as Lefty Lewis
- Ralf Harolde as Joe Torelli
- Hal K. Dawson as J.B. Brown
- Toddy Peterson as Mabel
- Kenneth Chryst as 'Mouse'
- Pierce Lyden as Gap

== Reception ==
According to B Movies by Don Miller, "Most of the remainder of the 1942 PRC product dealt with gangsters, crime or whodunit puzzles, reliable standbys of the indie companies catering to action and grind theater houses. Baby Face Morgan played it for laughs, with Cromwell as a rube posing as a tough racketeer. Armstrong, [co-star] Chick Chandler and Carlisle lent strong support, and while it never scaled any heights it was a passable spoof of the genre."
