= The Purple Vigilantes =

1938 film

- Theatrical release poster
- Directed by: George Sherman
- Written by: William Colt MacDonald
- Screenplay by: Betty Burbridge; Oliver Drake
- Produced by: Sol C. Siegel
- Starring: Robert Livingston; Ray Corrigan; Max Terhune
- Cinematography: Ernest Miller
- Edited by: Lester Orlebeck
- Music by: Alberto Colombo
- Distributed by: Republic Pictures
- Release date: January 24, 1938
- Running time: 58 minutes
- Country: United States
- Language: English

The Purple Vigilantes is a 1938 American Western film directed by George Sherman and starring Robert Livingston, Ray Corrigan, and Max Terhune. Written by Betty Burbridge and Oliver Drake, the film is about a rancher who organizes other ranchers to form a vigilante group in order to rid their town of outlaws. After the outlaws are defeated, some of the men, posing as the vigilant group, go on a crime spree. The Purple Vigilantes is the 12th entry in the Three Mesquiteers series of B-movies produced by Republic Pictures. The film was released in the United Kingdom as Purple Riders because at that time the word "vigilante" was unknown in Britain.

John Denvir, in his book, Legal Reelism: Movies as Legal Texts, compared the hooded-and-robed vigilantes in the film to the Ku Klux Klan. He cited The Purple Vigilantes as being "the series western most clearly inspired by the Klan", noting that the film was "treating its hooded terrorist organization as originally serving a legitimate purpose but corrupted over time."

== Cast ==
- Robert Livingston as Stony Brooke
- Ray Corrigan as Tucson Smith
- Max Terhune as Lullaby Joslin
- Joan Barclay as Jean McAllister
- Earl Dwire as David Ross
- Earle Hodgins as J. T. McAllister
- Francis Sayles as Wiliam Jones
- George Chesebro as Eggers
- Robert Fiske as George Drake
- Jack Perrin as Duncan
- Ernie Adams as Blake
- William Gould as Jenkins, Saloon Owner
- Harry Strang as Murphy
- Ed Cassidy as Sheriff Jim (as Edward Cassidy)
