= Dangerous Crossroads =

1933 film

- Theatrical release poster
- Directed by: Lambert Hillyer
- Screenplay by: Lew Levenson
- Story by: Horace McCoy; Charles R. Condon
- Starring: Charles "Chic" Sale; Diane Sinclair; Frank Albertson; Preston Foster; Jackie Searl; Niles Welch
- Cinematography: Benjamin H. Kline
- Edited by: Gene Havlick
- Production company: Columbia Pictures
- Distributed by: Columbia Pictures
- Release date: June 15, 1933
- Running time: 62 minutes
- Country: United States
- Language: English

Dangerous Crossroads is a 1933 American pre-Code action film directed by Lambert Hillyer and written by Lew Levenson. The film stars Charles "Chic" Sale, Diane Sinclair, Frank Albertson, Preston Foster, Jackie Searl and Niles Welch. The film was released on June 15, 1933, by Columbia Pictures.

== Cast ==
- Charles "Chic" Sale as Rufe Marvin
- Diane Sinclair as Lois
- Frank Albertson as Jimmy Blake
- Preston Foster as Hinton
- Jackie Searl as Jackie
- Niles Welch as Curtis
- Eddie Kane as Herb Jackson
- Tom Forman as Lefty
