= The New School Teacher =

1924 film

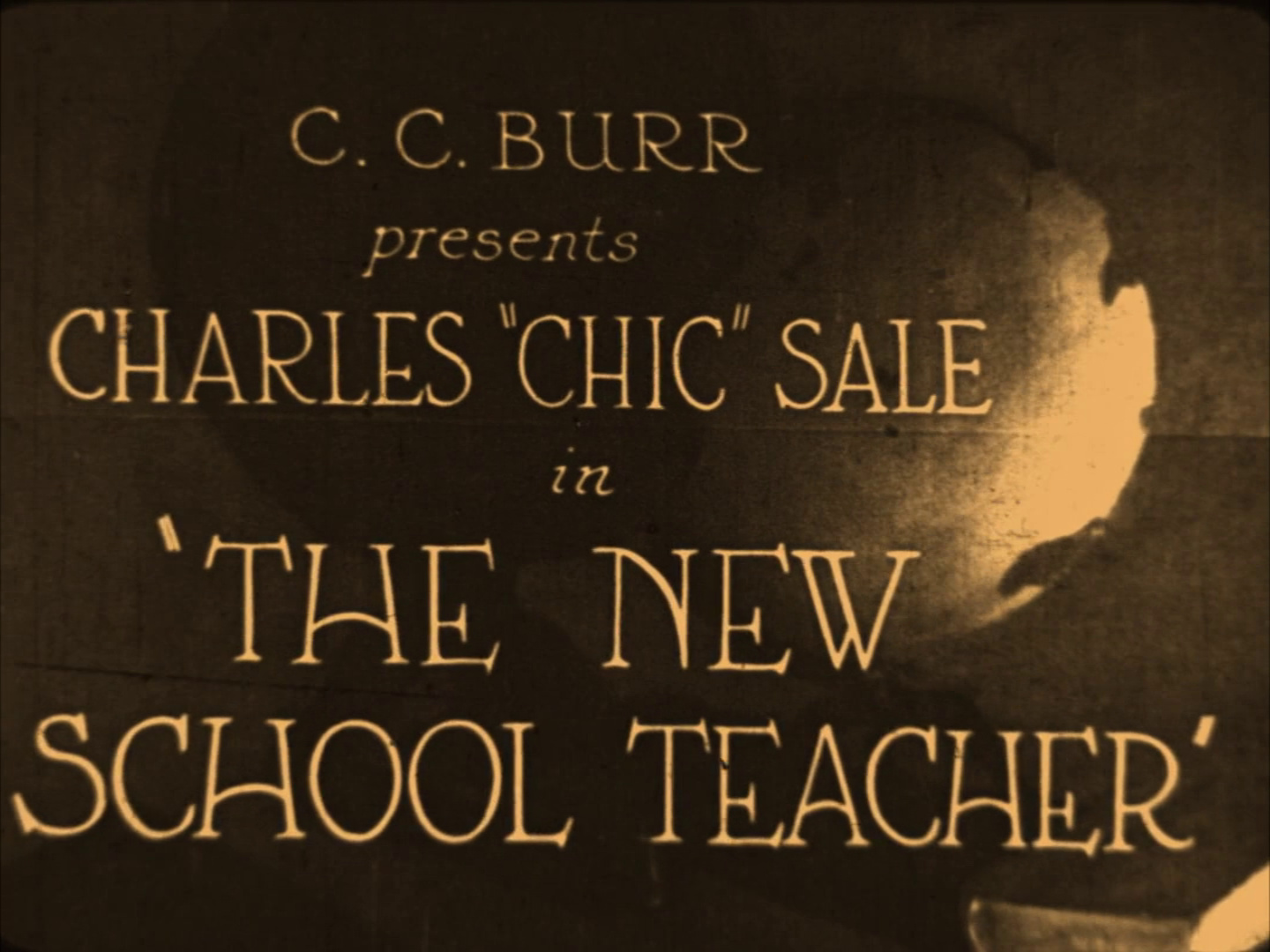
- Directed by: Gregory La Cava
- Written by: Ray Harris; Gregory La Cava
- Based on: Short stories by Irvin S. Cobb
- Produced by: C.C. Burr
- Starring: Charles 'Chic' Sale; Doris Kenyon; Mickey Bennett
- Cinematography: William McCoy; Neil Sullivan
- Production company: C.C. Burr Productions
- Distributed by: Associated Exhibitors
- Release date: June 1, 1924
- Running time: 52 minutes
- Country: United States
- Languages: Silent; English intertitles

The New School Teacher is a 1924 American silent comedy film directed by Gregory La Cava and starring Charles 'Chic' Sale, Doris Kenyon and Mickey Bennett. It was based on short stories by Irvin S. Cobb, and distributed by Associated Exhibitors.

== Synopsis ==
The New School Teacher (1924)

A new absent-minded schoolteacher arrives in a small town, but rapidly becomes a laughing stock due to the antics of his pupils. However, he proves himself to be a hero when the school building is set on fire by an escaped arsonist.

== Main cast ==
- Charles 'Chic' Sale as Professor Timmons
- Doris Kenyon as Diana Pope
- Mickey Bennett as Philander Pope
- Russell Griffin as Waldo Pope
- Robert Bentley as Diana's Fiancé
- Harlan Knight as Pupil
