= In Old Kentucky (1935 film) =

1935 film by George Marshall

- Theatrical release poster
- Directed by: George Marshall
- Written by: Sam Hellman; Gladys Lehman; Henry Johnson
- Based on: In Old Kentucky; 1893 play by Charles T. Dazey
- Produced by: Edward Butcher
- Starring: Will Rogers; Dorothy Wilson; Russell Hardie
- Cinematography: L. William O'Connell
- Edited by: Jack Murray
- Music by: Arthur Lange
- Production company: Fox Film Corporation
- Distributed by: 20th Century Fox
- Release date: November 22, 1935
- Running time: 86 minutes
- Country: United States
- Language: English
- Box office: $1,438,000 (U.S. and Canada rentals)

In Old Kentucky is a 1935 American comedy film starring Will Rogers, Dorothy Wilson and Russell Hardie. Two feuding families decide to settle a dispute with a horse race. It was Rogers' last film and was released posthumously after he was killed in a plane crash on August 15, 1935. The picture's supporting cast features Bill "Bojangles" Robinson as Wash Jackson. The film was released by 20th Century Fox. It was filmed on location on two sites in Thousand Oaks, California: Deerwood Stock Farm and Borchard Ranch.

== Synopsis ==
In Kentucky, amiable horse trainer Steve Tapley is caught up in the long-running feud between two families the Martingales and the Shattucks. It is decided to settle matter over a horse race.

== Cast ==
- Will Rogers as Steve Tapley
- Dorothy Wilson as Nancy Martingale
- Russell Hardie as Dr. Lee Andrews
- Charles Sellon as Ezra Martingale
- Louise Henry as Arlene Shattuck
- Esther Dale as Dolly Breckenridge
- Alan Dinehart as Slick Doherty
- Charles Richman as Pole Shattuck
- Etienne Girardot as Pluvius J. Aspinwall
- John Ince as Sheriff
- Bill Robinson as Wash Jackson
- Greyboy the Horse as Greyboy

== See also ==
- List of films about horses
- List of films about horse racing
