= Men of America =

1932 film

- Directed by: Ralph Ince
- Screenplay by: Samuel Ornitz; Jack Jungmeyer
- Story by: Henry McCarty; Humphrey Pearson
- Produced by: David O. Selznick
- Starring: William Boyd; Charles "Chic" Sale; Dorothy Wilson; Ralph Ince; Henry Armetta
- Cinematography: J. Roy Hunt
- Edited by: Edward Schroeder
- Music by: Max Steiner
- Production company: RKO Pictures
- Distributed by: RKO Pictures
- Release date: November 25, 1932
- Running time: 58 minutes
- Country: United States
- Language: English

Men of America is a 1932 American pre-Code Western film directed by Ralph Ince and written by Samuel Ornitz and Jack Jungmeyer. The film stars William Boyd, Charles "Chic" Sale, Dorothy Wilson, Ralph Ince, and Henry Armetta. The film was released on November 25, 1932, by RKO Pictures.

== Cast ==
- William Boyd as Jim Parker
- Charles "Chic" Sale as Smokey Joe Miller
- Dorothy Wilson as Anne
- Ralph Ince as Cicero
- Henry Armetta as Tony Garboni
- Inez Palange as Mrs Garboni
- Alphonse Ethier as Indian Tom
- Teresa Maxwell-Conover as Abigail
- Eugene Strong as 'Bugs' Foster
- Gene Layman as Henry Ellis
- Fred Lindstrand as Ole Jensen
- Frank Mills as Louie
