= Eight Girls in a Boat (1934 film) =

1934 film by Richard Wallace

- Theatrical release poster
- Directed by: Richard Wallace
- Screenplay by: Helmut Brandis; Lewis R. Foster; Casey Robinson
- Produced by: Charles R. Rogers
- Starring: Dorothy Wilson; Douglass Montgomery; Kay Johnson; Walter Connolly; Ferike Boros; James Bush; Barbara Barondess
- Cinematography: Gilbert Warrenton
- Production company: Paramount Pictures
- Distributed by: Paramount Pictures
- Release date: January 5, 1934
- Running time: 85 minutes
- Country: United States
- Language: English

Eight Girls in a Boat is a 1934 American Pre-Code drama film directed by Richard Wallace and written by Helmut Brandis, Lewis R. Foster and Casey Robinson. It is a remake of the 1932 German film Eight Girls in a Boat, which was also co-written by Brandis.

The film stars Dorothy Wilson, Douglass Montgomery, Kay Johnson, Walter Connolly, Ferike Boros, James Bush and Barbara Barondess. The film was released on January 5, 1934, by Paramount Pictures.

== Plot ==
While attending a girls' school in Switzerland, young Christa Storm discovers she is expecting a baby. Student David wants to marry her, but he is poor and Christa's father objects to him as a suitable spouse. Christa contemplates suicide by poison and even enjoys a final night out with friends before having a change of heart.

Others from the rowing team, including the coach, are unaware of Christa's plight. To punish her, the coach at one point makes Christa do strenuous dives and strokes in the water until she nearly collapses. All turns out well for her in the end.

== Cast ==
- Dorothy Wilson as Christa Storm
- Douglass Montgomery as David Perrin
- Kay Johnson as Hannah
- Walter Connolly as Storm
- Ferike Boros as Frau Kruger
- James Bush as Paul Lang
- Barbara Barondess as Pickles
- Colin Campbell as Smallman
- Jennifer Gray as The Strange One
- Ruth Heinaman as Goggles
- Baby Peggy as Hortense
- Margaret Marquis as Elizabeth
- Dorothy Drake as The Naughty
- Kathleen Fitz as The Ritzy
- Phyllis Ludwig as The Cry-Baby
- Marjorie L. Carver as Bobby
- Virginia Hall as Mary
- Kay Hammond as Katza
