= One in a Million (1934 film) =

1935 film by Frank R. Strayer

- Directed by: Frank R. Strayer
- Written by: Karl Brown; Robert Ellis
- Produced by: Maury M. Cohen
- Starring: Dorothy Wilson; Charles Starrett; Guinn 'Big Boy' Williams
- Cinematography: M.A. Anderson
- Edited by: Roland D. Reed
- Production company: Invincible Pictures
- Distributed by: Chesterfield Pictures
- Release date: September 15, 1934 (US)
- Running time: 70 minutes
- Country: United States
- Language: English

One in a Million is a 1934 American drama film directed by Frank R. Strayer and starring Dorothy Wilson, Charles Starrett and Guinn 'Big Boy' Williams.

== Cast ==
- Dorothy Wilson as Dorothy 'Babe' Brooks
- Charles Starrett as Donald Cabot Jr.
- Guinn 'Big Boy' Williams as Spike McGafferty
- Gwen Lee as Kitty Kennedy
- Holmes Herbert as Donald Cabot Sr.
- Francis Sayles as Mr. Dickman
- Fred Santley as Frankie, aka 'Madame Francois'
- Barbara Rogers as Patsy Purcell
- Robert Frazer as Detective Captain
- Belle Daube as Aunt Helen
- Lew Kelly as Store Detective Rourke
- Jane Keckley as Mrs. Woods, Dickman's neighbor
- Gladys Blake as Switchboard Operator
- John Elliott as Store Manager
- Leyland Hodgson as Aunt Helen's Butler
- Eddie Fetherston as Eddie
- Allen Wood as Bellhop
- Albert Pollet as Desk Clerk
- Hal Price as Witness Harry Miller

== Bibliography ==
- Michael R. Pitts. Poverty Row Studios, 1929–1940: An Illustrated History of 55 Independent Film Companies, with a Filmography for Each. McFarland & Company, 2005.
