= Laugh and Get Rich =

1931 film directed by Gregory La Cava

- Theatrical release poster
- Directed by: Gregory La Cava
- Written by: Douglas MacLean; Ralph Spence (dialogue)
- Screenplay by: Gregory La Cava
- Produced by: William LeBaron
- Starring: Edna May Oliver; Hugh Herbert; Dorothy Lee; Russell Gleason
- Cinematography: Jack MacKenzie
- Edited by: Jack Kitchin
- Production company: RKO Radio Pictures
- Distributed by: RKO Radio Pictures
- Release dates: March 27, 1931 (NYC); April 20, 1931 (US)
- Running time: 72 minutes
- Country: United States
- Language: English

Laugh and Get Rich is a 1931 pre-Code American comedy film, directed by Gregory La Cava, from a screenplay he also wrote with contributions from Douglas MacLean, who also was the associate producer, and Ralph Spence. The film stars Dorothy Lee, Edna May Oliver, Hugh Herbert, and Russell Gleason, and revolves around the antics in a boarding house in the early 1930s, run by Oliver, and the complications caused by her husband.

== Plot ==
Sarah Austin runs a boarding house during the Depression, always on the verge of bankruptcy. Her husband, Joe is a shiftless person who has never understood the concept of work; he is constantly involving them in get-rich-quick schemes. Their daughter, Alice, has her eyes set on poor young inventor, Larry Owens, but her mother wishes she would become involved with Bill Hepburn, seemingly from a well-connected family.

Sarah's illusions about Bill, however, are dashed when Bill kidnaps Joe, whom he mistakes for Mr. Pennypacker. Shortly after this, Joe takes Sarah's life savings, which she has hidden in a lamp, and invests it in an oil well, conned into it by one of Sarah's boarders, Mr. Phelps. When Sarah finds out, she is furious, so Joe goes out and takes a job as a ditch digger. However, much to everyone's surprise, the oil well actually strikes oil. Believing that they are rich, Sarah and Joe go visit Sarah's sister, Cassie Palfrey, who lives in an estate on Long Island.

While there, the oil well runs dry, and their newfound wealth evaporates. However, all is not lost, as they find out that one of Larry's inventions (which Joe has promoted), a tire valve, has attracted an investor, and they will be making over $50,000 per year off the invention, a veritable fortune in 1931.

== Cast ==
- Edna May Oliver as Sarah Austin
- Hugh Herbert as Joe Austin
- Dorothy Lee as Alice Austin
- Russell Gleason as Larry Owens
- John Harron as Bill Hepburn
- Charles Sellon as Biddle
- George Davis as Vincentini
- Robert Emmett Keane as Phelps
- Maude Fealy as Miss Teasdale
- Louise Mackintosh as Mrs. Cassandra 'Cassie' Palfrey
- Lita Chevret as Party guest
- Rochelle Hudson as Joan
- Ivan Lebedeff as The Count

Source:Cast list as per AFI database, and Theiapolis.com

== Production ==
"Board and Room" was the working title of the film during production.

== Reception ==
Mordaunt Hall of The New York Times gave the film a good review, calling it, "...a pleasant little comedy of boarding house life, distinguished by the performance of Edna May Oliver as the head of the establishment."

Silver Screen magazine gave it a good, but not great, review, stating the film was "... a nice homey comedy ..." which was "entertaining, but not a laugh riot", and praised Herbert, but were less impressed by Oliver. Photoplay was a bit kinder, complimenting both Herbert and Oliver, and saying that the film was "Good for plenty of laughs", and that audience members would be "... agreeably surprised at the newness of the treatment and gags." Motion Picture Magazine was the most impressed, not only praising Herbert and Oliver, but also Dorothy Lee, John Harron, and Russell Gleason as well. They called the picture, "... one of the best little comedies to happen along in many a celluloid moon."
