= Dorothy Wilson (actress) =

American actress (1909–1998)

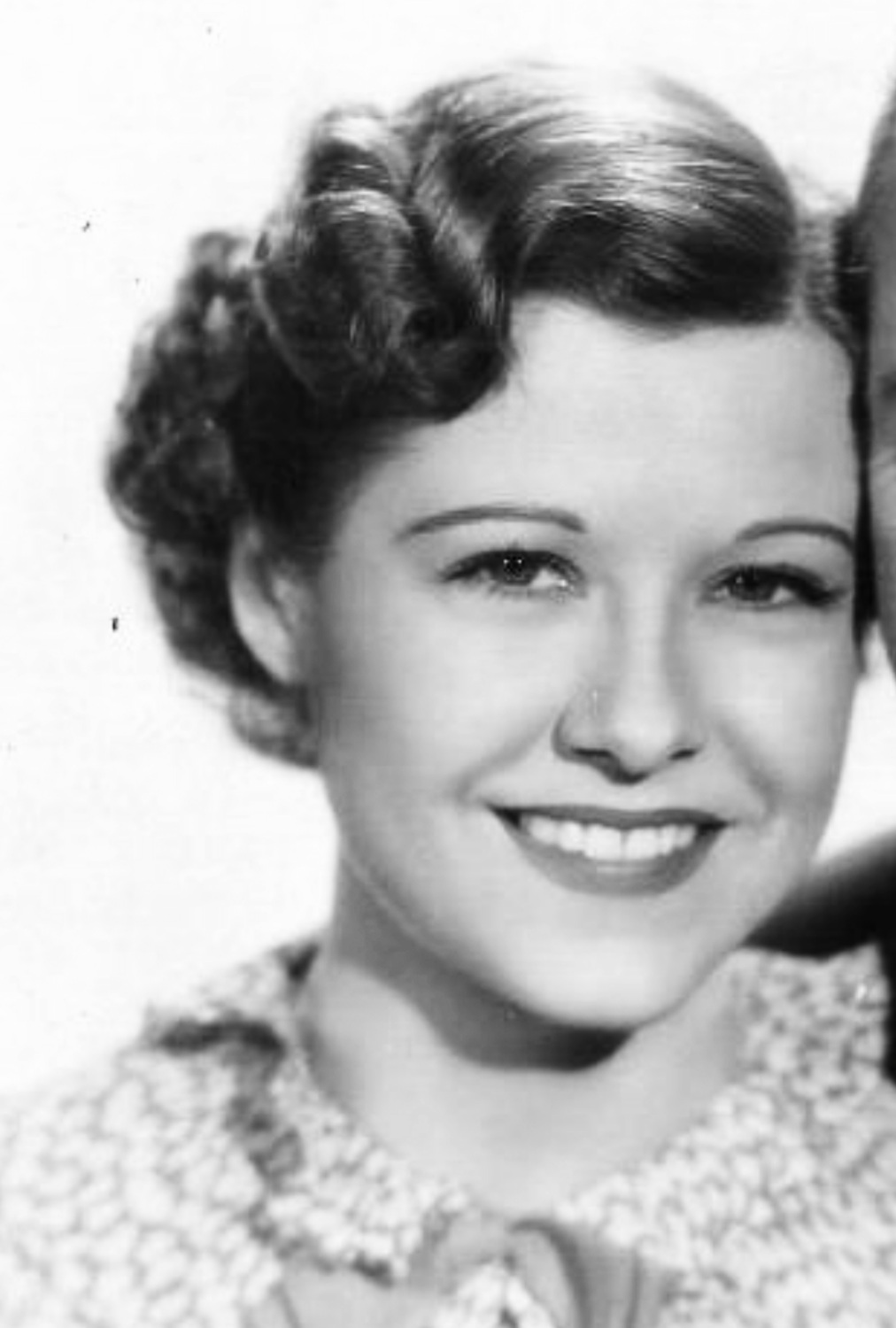
- Wilson in Bad Boy (1935)
- Born: November 14, 1909; Minneapolis, Minnesota, U.S.
- Died: January 7, 1998 (aged 88); Lompoc, California, U.S.
- Occupation: Actress
- Years active: 1932–1943
- Spouse: Lewis R. Foster (m. 1936; died 1974)
- Children: 2

Dorothy Wilson (November 14, 1909 – January 7, 1998) was an American movie actress of the 1930s.

== Early life ==
Wilson was born and raised in Minneapolis, Minnesota, moving to Los Angeles, California, after her high school graduation. Ironically, she had no interest in acting and had moved to Los Angeles due to an urge to travel.

== Career ==
In 1930, she began working as a secretary and applied at several employment agencies. She received a job at RKO Pictures, and for two years she worked there as a secretary. She often took notes for director Gregory La Cava; she was noticed by the executive in charge of casting and offered a screen test for La Cava's upcoming 1932 film The Age of Consent. She won one of the two lead coed roles, opposite Richard Cromwell. Her performance in the movie received good reviews.

The same year, she was selected as one of the WAMPAS Baby Stars, along with future Hollywood legend Ginger Rogers and Gloria Stuart. She starred opposite some of Hollywood's biggest names, including Harold Lloyd, Richard Dix, Tom Keene, Preston Foster and Will Rogers. She appeared in 20 films between 1932 and 1937.

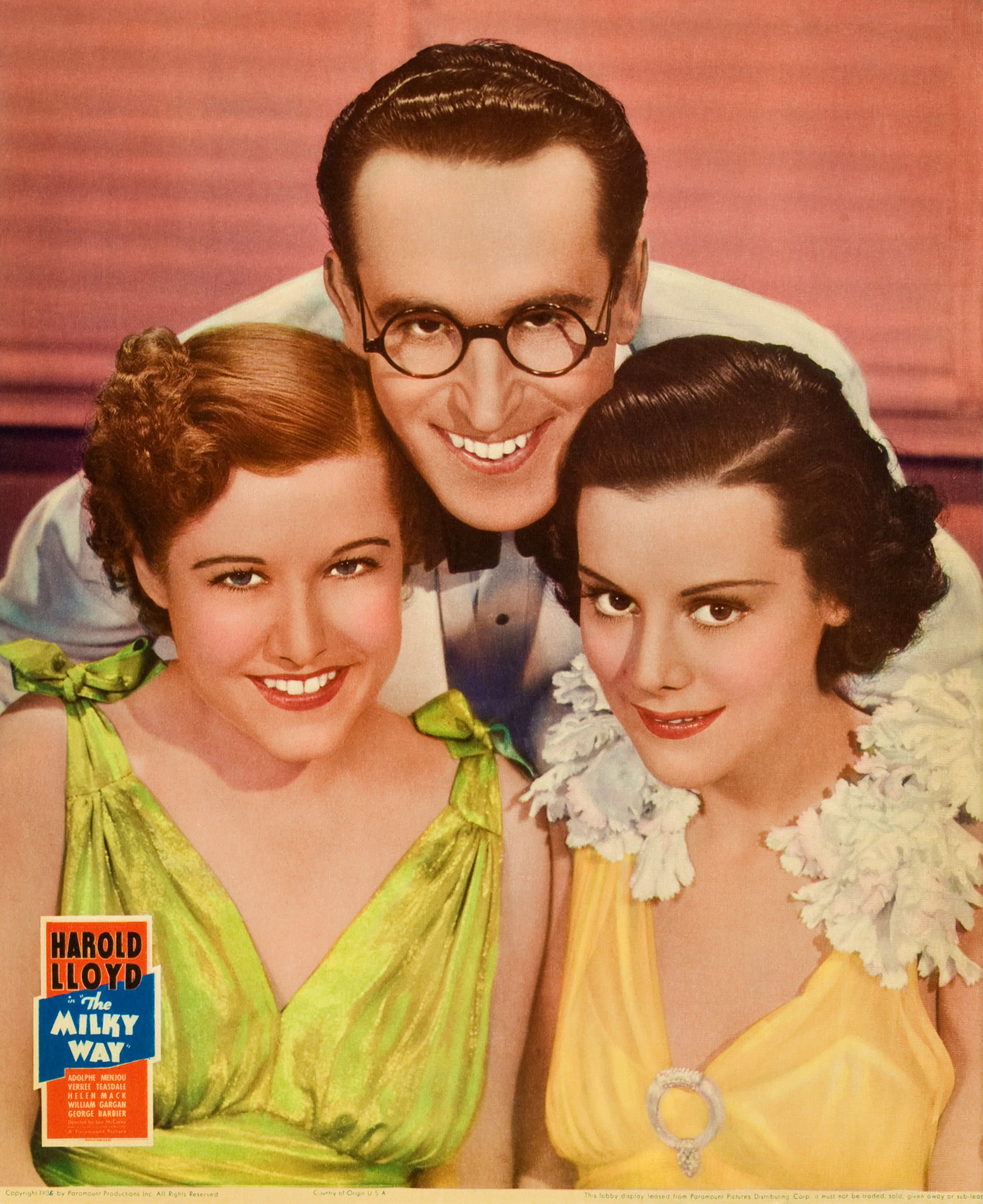
Dorothy Wilson, Harold Lloyd, and Helen Mack in a poster for The Milky Way (1936)

She was asked to test for the part of Melanie Hamilton in the epic movie Gone with the Wind, which she did, but she did not win the role, its being awarded to Olivia de Havilland. She starred in only two films after getting married, and then retired from acting to devote time to her family. She returned to acting only once, in an uncredited role in the 1943 film Whistling in Brooklyn.

== Personal life and death ==
In 1936, she married scriptwriter Lewis R. Foster, whom she had met while filming the 1934 movie Eight Girls in a Boat. Foster won an Oscar for his script for Mr. Smith Goes to Washington, released in 1939 and starring James Stewart and Jean Arthur, based on Foster's book The Gentleman from Montana. She and Foster remained together and raised a family of two children. Foster died in 1974. Dorothy never remarried and died in Lompoc, California, on January 7, 1998.

== Partial filmography ==
- The Age of Consent (1932) - Betty Cameron
- Men of America (1932) - Anne
- Lucky Devils (1933) - Fran Whitley
- Scarlet River (1933) - Judy Blake
- Before Dawn (1933) - Patricia
- Above the Clouds (1933) - Connie
- Eight Girls in a Boat (1934) - Christa Storm
- His Greatest Gamble (1934) - Alice Stebbins
- The Merry Widow (1934) - Maxim Girl (uncredited)
- The White Parade (1934) - Zita Scofield
- When a Man's a Man (1935) - Kitty Baldwin
- One in a Million (1935) - Dorothy 'Babe' Brooks
- Circus Shadows (1935) - Elaine Cavanaugh
- The Last Days of Pompeii (1935) - Clodia
- Bad Boy (1935) - Sally Larkin
- In Old Kentucky (1935) - Nancy Martingale
- The Milky Way (1936) - Polly Pringle
- Hollywood Boulevard (1936) - Minor Role (scenes deleted)
- Craig's Wife (1936) - Ethel Landreth
- Speed to Spare (1937) - Eileen Hart
- Whistling in Brooklyn (1943) - Radio Quartette Member (uncredited) (final film role)
