= Frank Albertson =

American actor (1909–1964)

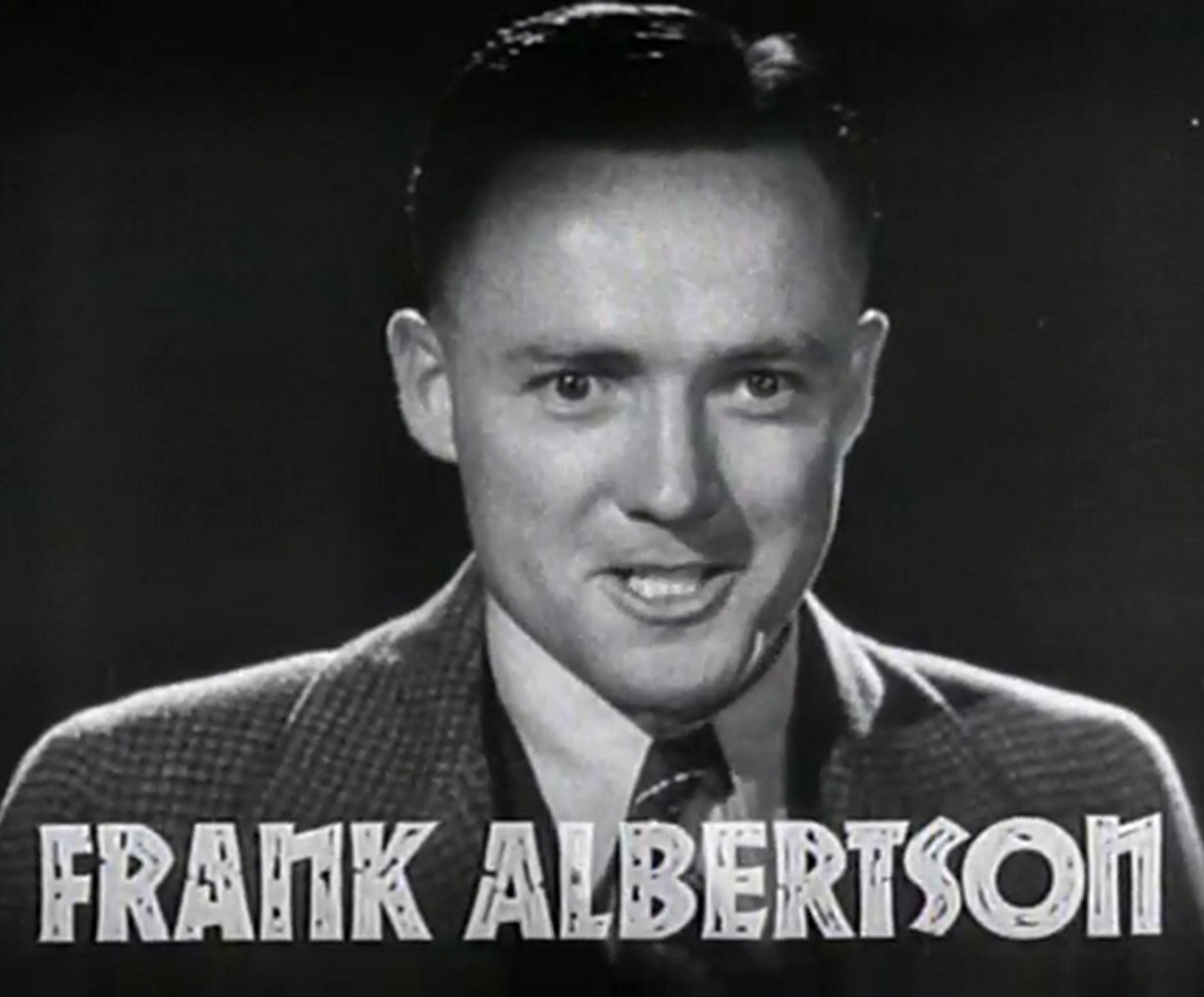
- Albertson in the trailer for Fury (1936)
- Born: Francis Healey Albertson; February 2, 1909; Fergus Falls, Minnesota, U.S.
- Died: February 29, 1964 (aged 55); Santa Monica, California, U.S.
- Resting place: Holy Cross Cemetery, Culver City, California
- Occupation: Actor
- Years active: 1923–1964
- Children: 5

Francis Healey Albertson (February 2, 1909 – February 29, 1964) was an American actor who had supporting roles in films such as It's a Wonderful Life (1946) and Psycho (1960).

== Early life ==
Albertson was a native of Fergus Falls, Minnesota, the first child of Frank (or Francis) B. and Mary (née Healey) Albertson. He spent his childhood first in nearby Frazee, and later in Puyallup, Washington. As a young man in Los Angeles, he worked as a laboratory assistant in a photographic shop, which resulted in contacts leading to his acting career.

== Career ==
Albertson made well over 100 appearances (1923–1964) in movies and television. In his early career he often sang and danced in such films as Just Imagine (1930) and A Connecticut Yankee (1931). He was featured in Alice Adams (1935) as the title character's brother, and as playwright Leo Davis in Room Service (1938) opposite the Marx Brothers. He served in the U.S. Army Air Forces' First Motion Picture Unit making training films during World War II. As he aged, he moved from featured roles to supporting and character parts. He can be seen as Sam Wainwright, the businessman fond of saying "Hee-Haw" in the movie It's a Wonderful Life (1946).

On October 10, 1950, Albertson starred in "Give and Take" on Armstrong Circle Theatre. He portrayed future U.S. President Theodore Roosevelt in the 1956 episode "Rough Rider" of the television series My Friend Flicka. He guest-starred in the western series The Californians and twice in the crime drama Richard Diamond, Private Detective.

In Psycho (1960), Albertson portrayed Tom Cassidy, the wealthy client who flirts with Marion Crane (Janet Leigh) and provides the $40,000 in cash she later absconds with. In the 1960-61 television season, Albertson played the character Mr. Cooper in five episodes of the sitcom Bringing Up Buddy, starring Frank Aletter. In 1962, he appeared as Henry Bildy on the TV western Lawman in the episode titled "Heritage of Hate".

In 1964, Albertson was cast as Jim O'Neal in the episode "The Death of a Teacher" of drama Mr. Novak. One of his latter screen appearances was as Sam, the bewildered mayor of Sweet Apple, Ohio in the 1963 film musical Bye Bye Birdie.

Albertson's final acting appearance was on The Andy Griffith Show, in which he played a Marine commander completing an inspection. The episode aired on May 19, 1964, three months after his death.

== Death ==
Albertson died in his sleep at his home in Santa Monica, California, on Leap Day--Saturday, February 29, 1964--aged 55. The cause of death was an apparent heart attack. He had five children (Note: Albertson's obituary in The New York Times lists four children ("two sons, Frank Jr. and Tony, and two daughters, Mrs. Gretchen Olberg and Juliet Albertson") as survivors, along with his wife.) from his two marriages. He was buried in Holy Cross Cemetery, Culver City, California.

== Recognition ==
For his contributions to the film industry, Albertson received a motion pictures star on the Hollywood Walk of Fame at 6754 Hollywood Boulevard. The star was dedicated on February 8, 1960.

== Filmography ==
- The Covered Wagon (1923) as Minor Role (uncredited)
- The Farmer's Daughter (1928) as Allan Boardman Jr.
- Prep and Pep (1928) as Bunk Hill
- Blue Skies (1929) as Richard Lewis (episode 2)
- Words and Music (1929) as Skeet Mulroy
- Salute (1929) as Midshipman Albert Edward Price
- Happy Days (1929) as Frankie Albertson
- Men Without Women (1930) as Ensign Albert Edward Price
- The Big Party (1930) as Jack Hunter
- Son of the Gods (1930) as Kicker
- Spring Is Here (1930) as Stacy Adams
- Born Reckless (1930) as Frank Sheldon
- So This Is London (1930) as Junior Draper
- Wild Company (1930) as Larry Grayson
- Just Imagine (1930) as RT-42
- A Connecticut Yankee (1931) as Emile le Poulet / Clarence
- Big Business Girl (1931) as Johnny Saunders
- Traveling Husbands (1931) as Barry Greene
- The Brat (1931) as Stephen Forester
- Way Back Home (1931) as David Clark
- The Tiger's Son (1931)
- The Cohens and Kellys in Hollywood (1932) as Frank Albertson (uncredited)
- Racing Youth (1932) as Teddy Blue
- Huddle (1932) as Larry
- Air Mail (1932) as Tommy Bogan
- The Lost Special (1932, Serial) as Tom Hood
- The Billion Dollar Scandal (1933) as Babe Partos
- The Cohens and Kellys in Trouble (1933) as Bob Graham
- Ann Carver's Profession (1933) as Jim Thompson
- Dangerous Crossroads (1933)
- Midshipman Jack (1933) as Russell H. Burns
- Ever in My Heart (1933) as Sam Archer
- Rainbow Over Broadway (1933) as Don Hayes
- King for a Night (1933) as Dick Morris
- The Last Gentleman (1934) as Allan Blaine, Augusta's adopted son
- The Life of Vergie Winters (1934) as Ranny Truesdale
- Hollywood Hoodlum (1934) as Daniel Patrick Ryan
- Bachelor of Arts (1934) as Pete Illings
- Enter Madame (1935) as John Fitzgerald
- College Scandal (1935) as Student (scenes deleted)
- Doubting Thomas (1935) as Jimmy Brown
- Alice Adams (1935) as Walter Adams
- Waterfront Lady (1935) as Ronny Hillyer aka Bill
- Personal Maid's Secret (1935) as Kent Fletcher
- East of Java (1935) as Larry Page
- Kind Lady (1935) as Peter Santard
- Ah, Wilderness! (1935) as Arthur
- The Farmer in the Dell (1936) as Davy Davenport
- Fury (1936) as Charlie
- The Plainsman (1936) as A Young Trooper
- Navy Blue and Gold (1937) as Weeks
- Hold That Kiss (1938) as Steve Evans
- Mother Carey's Chickens (1938) as Tom Hamilton Jr.
- Fugitives for a Night (1938) as Matt Ryan
- Room Service (1938) as Leo Davis
- Spring Madness (1938) as Hat
- The Shining Hour (1938) as Benny Collins
- Bachelor Mother (1939) as Freddie Miller
- Framed (1940) as Henry T. 'Hank' Parker
- The Ghost Comes Home (1940) as Ernest
- When the Daltons Rode (1940) as Emmett Dalton
- Dr. Christian Meets the Women (1940) as Bill Ferris
- Behind the News (1940) as Jeff Flavin
- Ellery Queen's Penthouse Mystery (1941) as Sanders
- Man Made Monster (1941) as Mark Adams
- Father Steps Out (1941) as Jimmy Dugan
- Citadel of Crime (1941) as Jim Rogers
- Burma Convoy (1941) as Mike Weldon
- Flying Cadets (1941) as Bob Ames
- Louisiana Purchase (1941) as Robert Davis, Jr.
- Man from Headquarters (1942) as Larry Doyle
- Shepherd of the Ozarks (1942) as Lieutenant James J. 'Jimmy' Maloney, Jr.
- Junior G-Men of the Air (1942, Serial) as Jerry Markham
- Wake Island (1942) as Johnny Rudd
- City of Silent Men (1942) as Gil Davis
- Underground Agent (1942) as Johnny Davis
- Silent Witness (1943) as Bruce L. Strong, Attorney
- Keep 'Em Slugging (1943) as Frank Moulton
- Here Comes Elmer (1943) as Joe Maxwell
- Mystery Broadcast (1943) as Michael Jerome
- O, My Darling Clementine (1943) as 'Dapper' Dan Franklin
- Rosie the Riveter (1944) as Charlie Doran
- And the Angels Sing (1944) as Oliver
- I Love a Soldier (1944) as Little Soldier (uncredited)
- Arson Squad (1945) as Tom Mitchell
- How Doooo You Do!!! (1945) as Tom Brandon
- Gay Blades (1946) as Frankie Dowell
- They Made Me a Killer (1946) as Patrolman Al Wilson
- Ginger (1946) as Barney O'Hara
- It's a Wonderful Life (1946) as Sam Wainwright
- The Hucksters (1947) as Max Herman
- Killer Dill (1947) as William T. Allen
- Shed No Tears (1948) as Lieutenant Hutton, Police Detective
- Main Street to Broadway (1953) as Frank Albertson (uncredited)
- Girl on the Run (1953) as Hank
- The Man Who Knew Too Much (1956) as Worker at the Taxidermist's (uncredited)
- Nightfall (1957) as Dr. Edward Gurston
- The Enemy Below (1957) as Lieutenant Crain
- The Last Hurrah (1958) as Jack Mangan
- Official Detective (1958, Episode: "Muggers") as Detective David 'King' Cassidy
- Psycho (1960) as Tom Cassidy
- Man-Trap (1961) as Paul Snavely
- Don't Knock the Twist (1962) as Herbert 'Herb' Walcott
- Papa's Delicate Condition (1963) as Gambler (uncredited)
- Bye Bye Birdie (1963) as Sam, the Mayor
- Johnny Cool (1963) as Bill Blakely

=== Selected television ===
Year	Title	Role	Notes
1958	Alfred Hitchcock Presents	Regis	Season 3 Episode 27: "Disappearing Trick"
1959	Alfred Hitchcock Presents	Sergeant Kirby	Season 4 Episode 16: "Out There – Darkness"
1959	Peter Gunn	Capt. Clark	Season 2 Episode 8 "Kidnap"
1959	Wanted Dead or Alive	George Elkins	Season 2 Episode 9 "The Tyrant"
1960	Wanted Dead or Alive	Sheriff Mike Strata	Season 3, Episode 8 "To the Victor"
1960	Leave It to Beaver	Mr. Gannon	Season 3 Episode 17 "Wally's Test"
1961	Bringing Up Buddy	Mr. Cooper	Recurring role, 6 episodes
1961	The Tom Ewell Show	Al Gallagher	Season 1, Episode 24 "The Prying Eye"
1961	Alfred Hitchcock Presents	George Wyncliff	Season 6 Episode 30: "You Can't Trust a Man"
1963	The Alfred Hitchcock Hour	Constable Tom Batterman	Season 1, Episode 28: "Last Seen Wearing Blue Jeans"
1963	Bonanza	Sam Walker	Season 5, Episode 2 "A Passion for Justuce"
1964	Mr. Novak	Jim O'Neal	Season 1, Episode 20 "The Death of a Teacher"
1964	The Andy Griffith Show	Colonel Watson	Season 4 Episode 32 "Gomer Pyle, U.S.M.C."
