= Inez Palange =

American actress

- Born: Antonietta Parillo; June 13, 1889; Roccasicura, Italy
- Died: October 16, 1962 (aged 73); Los Angeles, California, United States
- Other name: Ines Palange
- Occupations: Actress; singer
- Years active: 1930–1958

Inez Palange (June 13, 1889 – October 16, 1962), also written as Ines Palange, was an Italian-born American actress and singer who was best known for her role as Mrs. Camonte in the 1932 film Scarface.

== Early life ==
She was born in Roccasicura, Italy on June 13, 1889.

== Music career ==
Prior to her film career she was part of Les Iris Palange, a comedy and singing duo with Alberto Palange. At least two of their recordings on Victor records from 1917 are part of the Library of Congress catalogue (and posted to YouTube). They performed in Italian. A bit about her experience as an immigrant along with others is noted in a book on Italian immigrants.

== Film career ==
Palange performed in the first Italian language dialogue film, Sei tu l'amore?, released in 1930.

Palange played the mother of a gangster in Scarface (1932). Her dialogue with the character of her American-born daughter in which she warns against her son's character has been described as portraying two conflicting character traits, her Old World wisdom in seeing through her son's facade but expressed in halting, non-standard English, underlining her status in the New World as an unassimilated and uneducated immigrant, signifying her inability to relate her insights to her daughter.

Palange had a variety of supporting, minor, and bit roles in various Hollywood films.

== Personal life ==
She died October 16, 1962, in Los Angeles, California.

== Selected filmography ==
- Sei tu l'amore? (1930) - The modiste
- Always Goodbye (1931) - Italian Maid (uncredited)
- Frankenstein (1931) - Villager (uncredited)
- Scarface (1932) - Mrs. Camonte, Tony's Mother
- Speak Easily (1932) - Rosa - Tony's Wife (uncredited)
- Tiger Shark (1932) - Mike's Neighbor (uncredited)
- Men of America (1932) - Mrs. Garboni (uncredited)
- Grand Slam (1933) - Woman at Wedding Party (uncredited)
- The White Sister (1933) - Italian Mother (uncredited)
- The Mind Reader (1933) - Cleaning Lady (uncredited)
- Heroes for Sale (1933) - Mrs. Bonicelli (uncredited)
- Pilgrimage (1933) - Mrs. Carlucci (uncredited)
- Mary Stevens, M.D. (1933) - Tony's Wife (uncredited)
- Night Flight (1933) - Simone's Maid (uncredited)
- Fugitive Lovers (1934) - Maria (uncredited)
- Bedside (1934) - Italian Mother (uncredited)
- I've Got Your Number (1934) - Italian Lady (uncredited)
- Merry Wives of Reno (1934) - Italian Woman (uncredited
- All Men Are Enemies (1934) - Proprietress (uncredited)
- The Age of Innocence (1934) - Natasia (uncredited)
- Society Doctor (1935) - Mrs. Esposito (uncredited)
- Enchanted April (1935) - Castle Servant (uncredited)
- After Office Hours (1935) - Diner Owner's Wife (uncredited)
- Black Fury (1935) - Mrs. Morova (uncredited)
- Dinky (1935) - Junkman's Wife (uncredited)
- Break of Hearts (1935) - Violin Student's Mother (uncredited)
- The Flame Within (1935) - Bar and Flophouse Manager (uncredited)
- Case of the Missing Man (1935) - Italian Mother
- The Melody Lingers On (1935) - Louisa
- A Night at the Opera (1935) - Maid (uncredited)
- It Had to Happen (1936) - Italian Mother (uncredited)
- Robin Hood of El Dorado (1936) - Nurse with Madre (uncredited)
- Women Are Trouble (1936) - Italian Mother (uncredited)
- His Brother's Wife (1936) - Native Mother (uncredited)
- Dodsworth (1936) - Teresa - Edith's Housekeeper (uncredited)
- Libeled Lady (1936) - Fortune Teller (uncredited)
- A Woman Rebels (1936) - Signora Grassi (uncredited)
- Once a Doctor (1937) - Mrs. Rossi (uncredited)
- Man of the People (1937) - Italian Woman (uncredited)
- Sea Devils (1937) - Mrs. Palange - Italian Woman (uncredited)
- Song of the City (1937)- Mrs. 'Mama' Romandi
- You Can't Have Everything (1937) - Mrs. Romano (uncredited)
- The Firefly (1937) - Flower Woman (uncredited)
- Portia on Trial (1937) - Mrs. Gannow
- Ebb Tide (1937) - Native Woman (uncredited)
- Wise Girl (1937) - Italian Hat Customer (uncredited)
- Change of Heart (1938) - Italian Cook (uncredited)
- Little Miss Roughneck (1938) - Mercedes Orozco
- The Black Doll (1938) - Rosita, the housekeeper
- The Baroness and the Butler (1938) - Gypsy Fortune-Teller (uncredited)
- Penrod and His Twin Brother (1938) - Foreign Woman (uncredited)
- King of the Newsboys (1938) - Neighbor (uncredited)
- Yellow Jack (1938) - Dr. Finlay's Housekeeper (uncredited)
- Speed to Burn (1938) - Mama Gambini
- Marie Antoinette (1938) - Fish Wife (uncredited)
- Flirting with Fate (1938) - Señora Lopez
- Road Demon (1938) - Mama Gambini
- Winner Take All (1939)- Mama Gambini
- The Lady and the Mob (1939) - Mrs. Angela Zambrogio (uncredited)
- Only Angels Have Wings (1939) - Lily's Aunt (uncredited)
- Chicken Wagon Family (1939) - Mrs. Buzzi
- The Grapes of Wrath (1940) - Woman in Camp (uncredited)
- Viva Cisco Kid (1940) - Maria (uncredited)
- One Million B.C. (1940) - Tohana
- I Was an Adventuress (1940) - Fisherman's Wife
- On Their Own (1940) - Mrs. Galentoni (uncredited)
- Behind the News (1940) - Almedo's Landlady (uncredited)
- Romance of the Rio Grande (1941)- Mama Lopez
- Caught in the Act (1941) - Mary Ripportella
- Flight from Destiny (1941) - Mrs. Moraciagos (uncredited)
- Under Fiesta Stars (1941) - Mrs. Romero
- Beyond the Blue Horizon (1942) - Native Nurse (uncredited)
- The Gay Sisters (1942) - Italian Woman Going to Court (uncredited)
- Life Begins at Eight-Thirty (1942) - Mrs. Spano (uncredited)
- Out of This World (1945) - Mrs. Palukas (uncredited)
- A Bell for Adano (1945) - Italian Woman (uncredited)
- Murder in the Music Hall (1946) - Mrs. Aldine (uncredited)
- The Homestretch (1947) - Gypsy Woman (uncredited)
- Unconquered (1947) - Squaw (uncredited)
- The Loves of Carmen (1948) - Woman in Crowd (uncredited)
- The Snake Pit (1948) - Italian Patient (uncredited)
- Captain Carey, U.S.A. (1950) - Villager (uncredited)
- September Affair (1950) - Concierge (uncredited)
- The Miracle of Our Lady of Fatima (1952) - Townswoman (uncredited)
- Cry of the Hunted (1953) - Old Woman (uncredited)
- Monster from the Ocean Floor (1954) - Tula
- Hot Blood (1956) - Gypsy (uncredited)
- The Ten Commandments (1956) - Slave (uncredited)
