= Gregory La Cava =

American film director

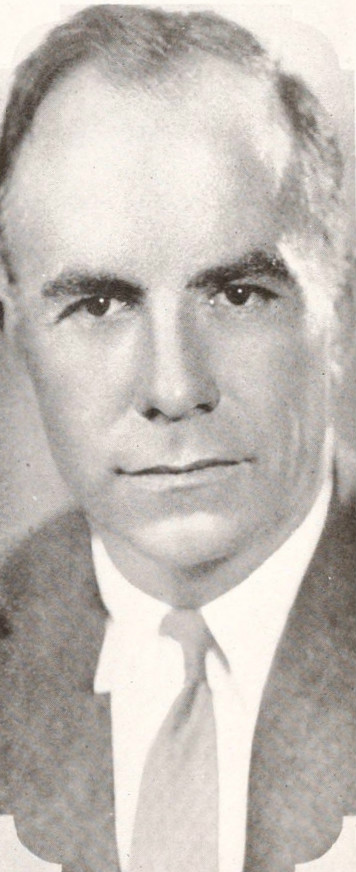
- La Cava in 1926
- Born: March 10, 1892; Towanda, Pennsylvania, US
- Died: March 1, 1952 (aged 59); Malibu, California, US
- Occupation: Film director

Gregory La Cava (March 10, 1892 – March 1, 1952) was an American film director of Italian descent best known for his films of the 1930s, including My Man Godfrey and Stage Door, which earned him nominations for Academy Award for Best Director.

== Career ==
La Cava was born in Towanda, Pennsylvania. His father was a shoemaker, and the family moved to Rochester, New York. La Cava reported for the Rochester Evening News and studied at the Art Institute of Chicago. He was a member of the Art Students' League.

=== Animator ===
Around 1913, he started doing odd jobs at the Barré Studio. By 1915, he was an animator on the Animated Grouch Chasers series.

Policy and Pie part 1 of 2 (1918)

Policy and Pie part 2 of 2 (1918)

Towards the end of 1915, William Randolph Hearst decided to create an animation studio to promote the comic strips printed in his newspapers. He called the new company International Film Service, and he hired La Cava to run it (for double what he was making with Barré). La Cava's first employee was his co-worker at the Barré Studio, Frank Moser. Another was his fellow student in Chicago, Grim Natwick (later to achieve fame at Disney). As he developed more and more of Hearst's comics into cartoon series, he came to put semi-independent units in charge of each, leading to the growth of individual styles.

La Cava also had the significant advantage over other studios of an unlimited budget: Hearst's business sense completely broke down when it came to his Hearst-Vitagraph News Pictorial and the "living comic strips" they contained. La Cava's main fault as a producer and director was that his cartoons were too clearly animated comic strips, hampered by speech balloons when rival Bray Studio was creating more effective series with original characters. He was apparently aware of this fault, and he had his animators study Charlie Chaplin films to improve their timing and characterization. But he didn't have time to achieve very much, because in July 1918, Hearst's bankers caught up with him and International Film Service was shut down.

Hearst still wanted his characters animated, so he licensed various studios to continue the IFS series. La Cava and most of the IFS staff got jobs with John Terry's studio (not surprising since John Terry himself was an IFS alumnus). This only lasted a few months before Terry's studio went out of business. The animators were immediately hired by Goldwyn-Bray (as Bray Productions was now known), but La Cava was not, since Goldwyn-Bray had several producers of its own and La Cava was not interested in starting over. Instead, he moved west to Hollywood.

=== Live action reels and features ===
By 1922, La Cava had become a live-action director of two-reel comedies, the direct competitor to animated films. Among the actors he directed in the silent era are:

- Bebe Daniels (Feel My Pulse, 1928)
- Richard Dix
- W. C. Fields (So's Your Old Man, 1926 and Running Wild, 1927) He became a good friend and drinking companion of Fields.

La Cava worked his way up to feature films in the silent era, but it is for his work in sound films of the 1930s—especially comedies—that he is best known today. And though he did not always get credit, he also often had a hand in creating the screenplays for his films. Among the sound films he directed are:

- Laugh and Get Rich (1931) with Edna May Oliver and Hugh Herbert

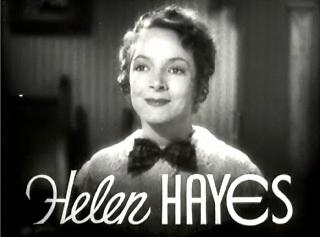
Helen Hayes in La Cava's film What Every Woman Knows (1934)

- The Half-Naked Truth (1932) with Lupe Vélez and Lee Tracy
- The Age of Consent (1932) for RKO, starring Richard Cromwell, Eric Linden, and Dorothy Wilson.
- Symphony of Six Million (1932) for RKO, based on a story by Fannie Hurst and starring Ricardo Cortez and Irene Dunne, which featured one of the first symphonic scores of the talkie era by Max Steiner.
- Bed of Roses (1932) with Constance Bennett and Pert Kelton
- Gabriel Over the White House (1933) with Walter Huston
- What Every Woman Knows (1934) with Helen Hayes
- The Affairs of Cellini (1934) with Constance Bennett and Fredric March
- Private Worlds (1935) with Claudette Colbert, Charles Boyer and Joel McCrea
- She Married Her Boss (1935) with Claudette Colbert and Melvyn Douglas
- My Man Godfrey (1936, nominated for the Best Director Academy Award) with William Powell and Carole Lombard
- Stage Door (1937, also nominated for Best Director) with Katharine Hepburn, Adolphe Menjou, and Gail Patrick, as well as his first of three consecutive films with Ginger Rogers
- Fifth Avenue Girl (1939) with Ginger Rogers and Walter Connolly
- Primrose Path (1940) with Ginger Rogers and Joel McCrea

During the 1940s, his career floundered when his output dropped severely. He only officially directed one film after 1942, Living in a Big Way (1947).

== Personal life and death ==
La Cava and his first wife, Beryl, had a son. They were divorced in 1937. On December 2, 1940, La Cava married Mrs. Grace O. Garland, widow of William J. Garland. He died on March 1, 1952, in his sleep at his home. His remains were buried at Chapel of the Pines Crematory.

== Filmography ==
| Year | Film | Academy Award Nominations | Academy Award Wins |
|---|---|---|---|
| 1921 | His Nibs | | |
| 1923 | The Life of Reilly | | |
| 1923 | Beware of the Dog | | |
| 1924 | Restless Wives | | |
| 1924 | The New School Teacher | | |
| 1925 | Womanhandled | | |
| 1926 | Let's Get Married | | |
| 1926 | Say It Again | | |
| 1926 | So's Your Old Man | | |
| 1927 | Paradise for Two | | |
| 1927 | Running Wild | | |
| 1927 | Tell It to Sweeney | | |
| 1927 | The Gay Defender | | |
| 1928 | Half a Bride | | |
| 1928 | Feel My Pulse | | |
| 1929 | Saturday's Children | | |
| 1929 | Big News | | |
| 1929 | His First Command | | |
| 1931 | Laugh and Get Rich | | |
| 1931 | Smart Woman | | |
| 1932 | Symphony of Six Million | | |
| 1932 | The Age of Consent | | |
| 1932 | The Half-Naked Truth | | |
| 1933 | Gabriel Over the White House | | |
| 1933 | Bed of Roses | | |
| 1933 | Gallant Lady | | |
| 1934 | The Affairs of Cellini | 4 | 0 |
| 1934 | What Every Woman Knows | | |
| 1935 | Private Worlds | 1 | 0 |
| 1935 | She Married Her Boss | | |
| 1936 | My Man Godfrey | 6 | 0 |
| 1937 | Stage Door | 4 | 0 |
| 1939 | Fifth Avenue Girl | | |
| 1940 | Primrose Path | 1 | 0 |
| 1941 | Unfinished Business | | |
| 1942 | Lady in a Jam | | |
| 1947 | Living in a Big Way | | |
| 1948 | One Touch of Venus | | |
