= Lucky Dog (film) =

1933 film by Zion Myers

- Directed by: Zion Myers
- Screenplay by: Zion Myers; Roland Asher
- Story by: Zion Myers
- Produced by: Carl Laemmle, Jr.
- Starring: Charles "Chic" Sale; Tom O'Brien; Harry Holman; Clarence Geldart
- Cinematography: Jerome Ash
- Edited by: Charles Hochberg
- Production company: Universal Pictures
- Distributed by: Universal Pictures
- Release date: April 20, 1933
- Running time: 60 minutes
- Country: United States
- Language: English

Lucky Dog is a 1933 American drama film directed by Zion Myers and written by Zion Myers and Roland Asher. The film stars Charles "Chic" Sale, Tom O'Brien, Harry Holman and Clarence Geldart. The film was released on April 20, 1933, by Universal Pictures.

== Cast ==
- Charles "Chic" Sale as Arthur Wilson
- Tom O'Brien as The Detective
- Harry Holman as The Business Man
- Clarence Geldart as Drunk #1
