= Charles "Chic" Sale =

Actor, entertainer and author

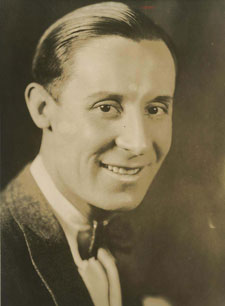
- Born: Charles Partlow Sale; August 25, 1885; Huron, South Dakota, U.S. (formerly Dakota Territory)
- Died: November 7, 1936 (aged 51); Los Angeles, California, U.S.
- Occupations: Actor, comedian
- Years active: 1915–1936
- Spouse: Marie Bishop (m. 1912)
- Children: 4

Charles Partlow "Chic" Sale (August 25, 1885 – November 7, 1936) was a vaudevillian, stage and movie actor, and author who specialized in playing older men and rural characters. He wrote several bestselling books based on the characters in his performances.

== Early years ==
Sale was born in Huron, South Dakota to dentist Dr. Frank Orville Sale and poet Lillie Belle Partlow Sale. In 1894, when Sale was 9, the family moved to Urbana, Illinois. Sale's family included older sister Edna, younger brother Dwight and younger sister Virginia (who would go on to become a film and television actor and writer).

In 1900, Sale, now known as "Chic", quit school at age 15 to work at the Big Four rail yard in Urbana. He soon learned he could make people laugh with his impersonations, especially of rural characters he had met. His brother Dwight was also a talented comic and storyteller, and the brothers put together an act. However, Dwight moved to Arizona to accept a job as a miner, and was killed in a mining accident in 1907.

== Vaudeville ==
After Dwight's death, Sale developed a solo act that involved impersonations of older rural characters. Sale took his act to vaudeville, and centered on one character, "The Specialist", a carpenter named Lem Putt who only built outhouses. The New York Clipper took in his show in January 1917, and noted, "Chic Sale, on very late, made the customary riotous hit he has been making regularly all season in metropolitan vaudeville houses." Sale also made occasional appearances in the Ziegfeld Follies and the Shubert Winter Garden shows, playing older rural men.

== Movies ==
In 1920, Sale was offered a Hollywood movie contract by Christie Studios. Movie columnist Grace Kingsley reported in the Los Angeles Times that "Chic Sale, currently performing at the Orpheum this week, will return to town as a Christie star once his present tour concludes in the middle of next month. His first film will be a five-reel adaptation of Irvin S. Cobb's The Smart Aleck, followed by starring roles in other well-known stories suited to his talents." The movie, eventually named His Nibs, co-starred Colleen Moore, and Sale played many of the "hick" characters himself.

Sale went on to appear in over twenty films, all of them comedies except for one of his final movies, 1935's The Perfect Tribute. Sale took on the role of Abraham Lincoln, dramatizing Lincoln's disappointment at the lackluster reaction to his Gettysburg Address. Lincoln happens to meet a boy, who asks him to come with him and act as an attorney his brother, for a dying soldier who wishes to dictate his last will and testament. The soldier was blinded at the Battle of Gettysburg, and not realizing that he is talking to the President, tells Lincoln about the extraordinary speech he has heard about, and how everyone present was so overawed by the speech that they were left speechless.

== Author ==
By 1929, Sale was well-known across the United States for his Lem Putt act. He became aware that other vaudeville actors were stealing his act, and decided to publish it as a book, thus enshrining its copyright status. Sale enlisted the aid of a political cartoonist, Roy James, and the result was a slim 31-page book, The Specialist. James' illustrations brought Sale's humor to life, and the book enjoyed great success. Sale spent the next several months responding to fan mail, and his next book was titled I'll Tell you Why. Sale also wrote another book,The Champion Cornhusker Crashes the Movies.

A year later, the book was so popular that Sale was able to parlay his portrayal of Lem Putt into an advertising campaign for Ex-Lax. The Specialist sold more than a million copies within a few years.

In his fifties, Sale observed that 25 years earlier he was playing the part of an 80-year-old man, but that in his middle age he was doing young men's parts. "If I live to be 70, I expect to be Shirley Temple's biggest rival."

== Personal life and death ==
Sale married Marie Bishop in 1912, and they raised four children: Cherry, Charles, Mary and Dwight. Sale died suddenly in 1936, age 52, from lobar pneumonia.

== Legacy ==
For many years "Chic Sale" was used as a euphemism for an outhouse, which Sale found unflattering, calling it "a terrible thing to have happen." Sale also became a well-known popular culture figure during the 1930s, and was often the butt of jokes by comedians like Groucho Marx, usually in reference to The Specialist. Sale is also mentioned as an aside late in the Marx Brothers film, Animal Crackers, in a conversation between Ravelli (Chico Marx) and Captain Spaulding.

Sale became the inspiration for a generation of comedians. Milton Supman, when he became a professional comedian, changed his name to Soupy Sales as a reference to Chic Sale.

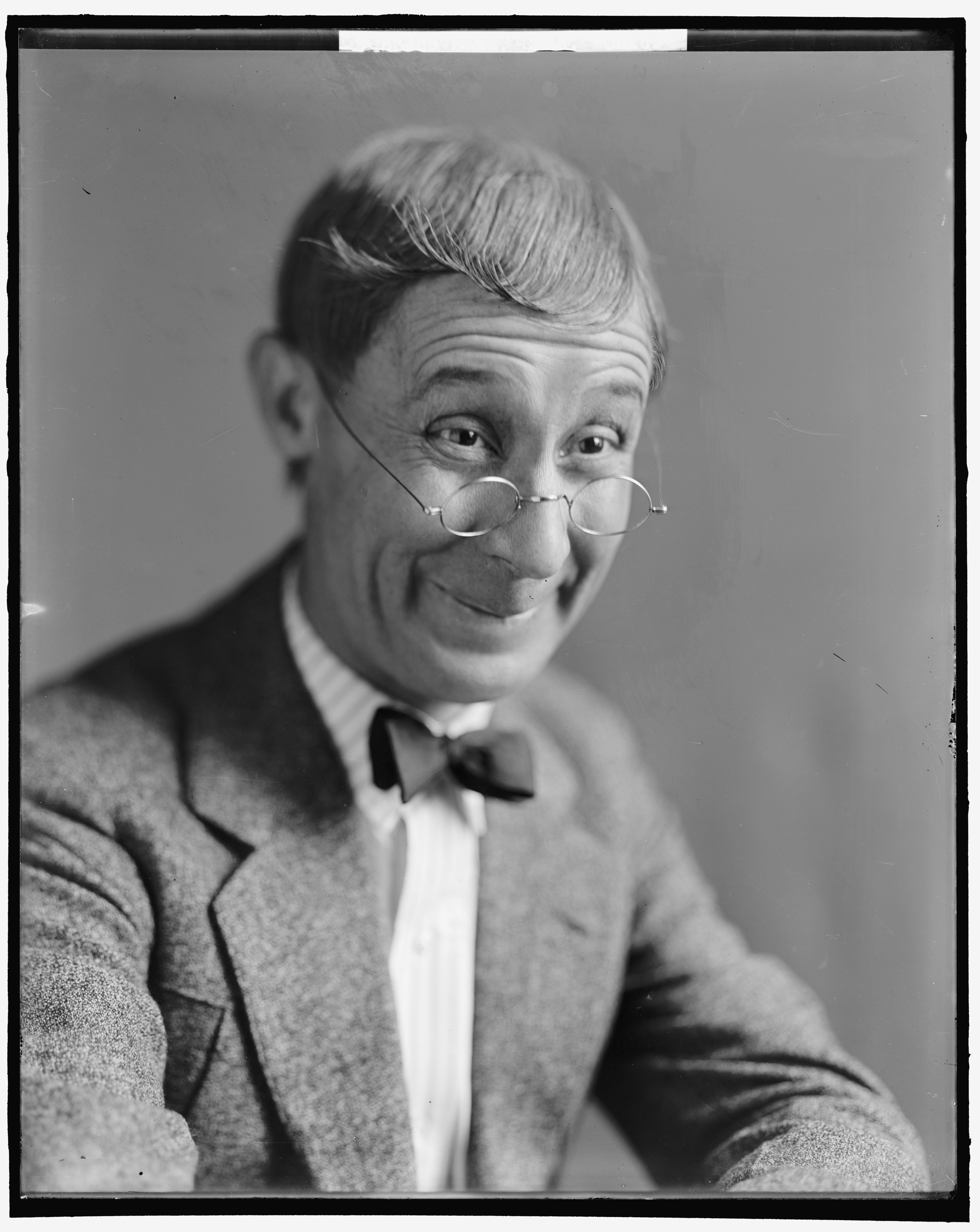
One of Sale's typical characters

== Filmography ==
Twenty films are listed at Turner Classic Movies:

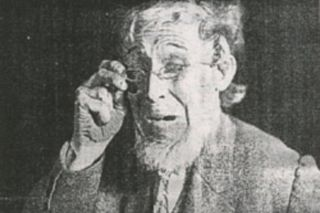
Still image from His Nibs of one the characters played by Sale

Year	Title	Role	Notes
1921	His Nibs	Theo. Bender (segment "His Nibs") / Wally Craw / Mr. Percifer / Elmer Bender / Peelee Gear Jr. / Miss Dessie Teed / The Boy	
1924	The New School Teacher	Prof. Timmons	
1927	They're coming to get me		Short
1931	The Star Witness	Pvt. Summerill	
1932	The Expert	Grandpa John T. Minick	
1932	When a Feller Needs a Friend	Uncle Jonas Tucker	
1932	Stranger in Town	Ulysses Crickle	
1932	Men of America	Smokey Joe Miller	
1933	Lucky Dog	Arthur Wilson	
1933	Dangerous Crossroads	Locomotive Engineer	
1933	The Chief	Uncle Joe	
1934	Treasure Island	Ben Gunn	
1935	The Fighting Westerner	Deputy Tex Murdock	
1935	It's a Great Life	Grandpa Barclay	
1936	Man Hunt	Ed Hoggins	
1936	Important News	Scoop Stevens with James Stewart as Corn	Short
1936	The Gentleman from Louisiana	Deacon Devlin	
1936	The Man I Marry	Sheriff Clem Loudecker	
1937	You Only Live Once	Ethan	final film role
