= Scarlet River =

1933 film by Otto Brower

- Theatrical release poster
- Directed by: Otto Brower
- Screenplay by: Harold Shumate
- Story by: Harold Shumate
- Produced by: David O. Selznick
- Starring: Tom Keene; Dorothy Wilson; Roscoe Ates; Lon Chaney Jr. Edgar Kennedy
- Cinematography: Nicholas Musuraca
- Edited by: Frederic Knudtson
- Music by: Max Steiner
- Production company: RKO Pictures
- Distributed by: RKO Pictures
- Release date: March 10, 1933
- Running time: 54 minutes
- Country: United States
- Language: English
- Budget: $30,000

Scarlet River is a 1933 American pre-Code Western film directed by Otto Brower, written by Harold Shumate, and starring Tom Keene, Dorothy Wilson, Roscoe Ates, Lon Chaney Jr. and Edgar Kennedy. It was released on March 10, 1933, by RKO Pictures.

== Plot ==
The West. A covered wagon pulls into view and stops. The couple in it have reached the end of the line. There is no water. A flourish of car horns announces the arrival of a huge limousine and a crowd of people, there to sell oil leases. Every attempt to find another location or angle is frustrated by real—and comical—life. The Hollywood cross-country marathon is the last straw.

Back at the studio restaurant, a colleague shows star Tom Baxter a photo of the Scarlet River Ranch, about to be returned with an unsolicited scenario. The photograph dissolves into the live ranch, where the mailman is trying to fit a returned manuscript into the mailbox. The eager author, Ulysses Mope, gallops up and falls off his horse. The mailman outlines the situation at the ranch: Miss Judy must renew the note or the lender will foreclose.

Foreman Jeff approves young Buck's chewing tobacco and gets him to take care of his horse. Ulysses tells Jeff about his movie plot: A foreman is planning to steal a ranch and force the owner to marry him. Ulysses is oblivious to the fact that he is describing Jeff, who turns on him, blaming Ulysses for a long list of problems draining their resources. Judy enters, and Jeff pressures her to marry him. Ulysses interrupts with the studio's letter about using the ranch as a location.

Jeff meets with banker "Clink" McPherson and demands a larger cut from their deal, but Clink threatens to tell the sheriff that Jeff is responsible for the rustling, hay-burning's and water-poisoning.

The Tom Baxter troupe arrives in a parade of vehicles. Tom is attracted to Judy and distrusts Jeff. Ulysses tells him about their troubles. Tom sees through it.

Jeff accuses Tom (who does all his own stunts) of being a "powder puff actor," and the director arranges for Jeff to do a stunt. He fails, and Tom does it properly, before Judy's admiring eyes. In the bunkhouse, Jeff picks a fight with Tom, who quickly knocks him out.

Later, Judy watches the filming of a kiss, and confesses to Tom that she could never make love in front of people. Ulysses interferes with the love scene, and the director calls for Benny to bring the "job stick", a slender length of wood and cord which he entangles in Ulysses' vest. If he can get it off without breakage, he can have a job.

Tom offers to enroll Buck in a good private school—and to bring him home for monthly visits. He kisses Judy. She slaps him. They apologize to each other.

That night, Tom rides after Jeff and sees him kill several steers, supposedly because they drank bad water. Tom has been investigating. If a veterinarian finds no poison, Jeff will be arrested.

Tom confronts Buck about his smoking and disrespect for his sister. Judy comes in while he is spanking the boy, who lies about what provoked the punishment. Judy is furious.

On the set, Buck has stopped smoking. He says sorry to Tom. McPherson has kidnapped Judy and, supposedly, Jeff. He sends Dummy with a note. Tom catches him, but he can't talk. The note says that Judy will be killed unless Tom and his crew leave Scarlet River.

Dummy rides up to the hideout and slips inside a back window. It is Tom. He tells Judy about Jeff. They run, but Judy is captured. Buck and Ulysses have been watching. Buck goes for the filmmakers and Ulysses for the sheriff.

McPherson plans to make Tom's fall from a cliff appear accidental. Tom tells Judy to keep running when he makes a break. The crew arrives and with manpower, blanks—and a live grenade—they stop McPherson's men. McPherson grabs Judy, and Jeff follows, telling him to let her go. McPherson kills him. Tom throws himself from horseback through the window and knocks McPherson out.

The sheriff thanks them for their help. When Judy asks Buck what he is doing there, Tom says he and Buck are partners. Tom and Judy walk off, his arm around her.

At last, Ulysses detaches the job stick. The director screams for Benny.

== Cast ==
- Tom Keene as Tom Baxter
- Dorothy Wilson as Judy Blake
- Lon Chaney Jr. as Jeff Todd (billed as Creighton Chaney, his birth name
- Roscoe Ates as Ulysses
- Edgar Kennedy as Sam Gilroy
- Hooper Atchley as 'Clink' McPherson
- Billy Butts as Buck Blake
- Betty Furness as Babe Jewel
- Jack Raymond as Benny
- James Mason as Dummy
- Yakima Canutt as Yak

Myrna Loy, Joel McCrea, Bruce Cabot and Rochelle Hudson have brief, uncredited cameos in an early scene at the film studio.

The director of photography was Nicholas Musuraca, who later worked with Jacques Tourneur on Cat People and Out of the Past.

== Production ==
David Lewis had been producing Tom Keene Westerns at RKO. He said head of production David O. Selznick wanted to do something different and requested Lewis make a Keene western set in the circus. It was realised that this would be too expensive - Keene Westerns had a budget ceiling for $30,000 - so the concept was revised to be about a movie cowboy, as the film could be shot on the RKO backlot.

== Reception ==
The film was well received and played at the Roxy in New York, a rare honor for a B Western. Lewis wrote that "Selznick didn't pay the slightest bit of attention."
