= Caught in the Act (1941 film) =

1941 film

- Directed by: Jean Yarbrough
- Written by: Al Martin; Robert James Cosgriff
- Produced by: Ted Richmond
- Starring: Henry Armetta; Iris Meredith; Inez Palange
- Cinematography: Mack Stengler
- Edited by: Martin G. Cohn; Carl Pierson
- Production company: Producers Releasing Corporation
- Distributed by: Producers Releasing Corporation
- Release date: January 17, 1941
- Running time: 62 minutes
- Country: United States
- Language: English

Caught in the Act is a 1941 American comedy crime film directed by Jean Yarbrough and starring Henry Armetta, Iris Meredith and Inez Palange. It was made and distributed as a low-budget second feature by the Producers Releasing Corporation.

== Synopsis ==
On his daughter's wedding day, construction foreman Mike Ripportella suddenly finds himself pursued by an attractive blonde, gangsters, and the police who want to pin a murder on him.

== Cast ==
- Henry Armetta as Mike Ripportella
- Iris Meredith as Lucy Ripportella
- Robert Baldwin as Jim Keene
- Charles Miller as Leonard Brandon
- Inez Palange as Mary Ripportella
- Richard Terry as Henderson - Extortion Gangster
- Joey Ray as Davis - Extortion Gangster
- Maxine Leslie as Fay Kingman
- William Newell as Police Sergeant Riley
- Jack Cheatham as Police Detective
- Fern Emmett as Gossip
- George McKay as Police Detective
- Frank O'Connor as Policeman
- Ralph Peters as Policeman
- Rose Plumer as Gossip

== Bibliography ==
- Fetrow, Alan G. Feature Films, 1940-1949: a United States Filmography. McFarland, 1994.
- Langman, Larry & Finn, Daniel. A Guide to American Crime Films of the Forties and Fifties. Greenwood Press, 1995.
