= Above the Clouds =

1933 film

- Directed by: Roy William Neill
- Written by: Albert DeMond
- Based on: Speed Demons by George B. Seitz
- Starring: Robert Armstrong; Richard Cromwell; Dorothy Wilson
- Cinematography: John Stumar
- Edited by: John Rawlins
- Production company: Columbia Pictures
- Distributed by: Columbia Pictures
- Release date: December 13, 1933
- Running time: 68 minutes
- Country: United States
- Language: English

Above the Clouds is a 1933 American pre-Code crime film directed by Roy William Neill and starring Robert Armstrong, Richard Cromwell and Dorothy Wilson. It was produced and distributed by Columbia Pictures.

== Cast ==
- Robert Armstrong as Scoop Adams
- Richard Cromwell as Dick Robinson
- Dorothy Wilson as Connie
- Edmund Breese as Crusty
- Morgan Wallace as Chandler
- Dorothy Revier as Dolly
- Bessie Barriscale as Mother
- Geneva Mitchell as Mabel
- Luis Alberni as Speakeasy Owner

== Bibliography ==
- Fetrow, Alan G. Sound films, 1927-1939: a United States Filmography. McFarland, 1992.
- Ness, Richard. From Headline Hunter to Superman: A Journalism Filmography. Scarecrow Press, 1997.
