= Feel My Pulse =

1928 film

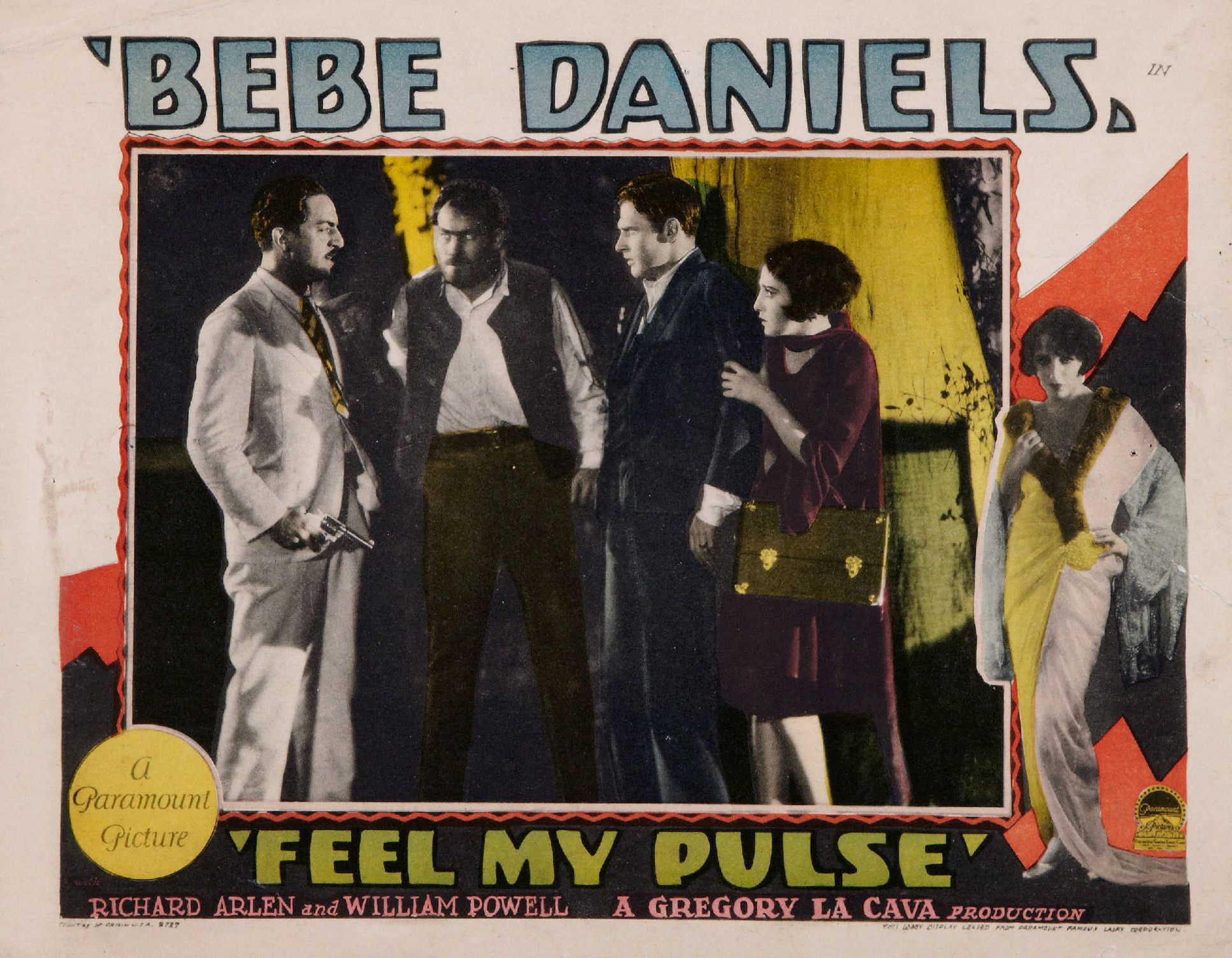
- Lobby card
- Directed by: Gregory La Cava
- Written by: Nicholas T. Barrows; Keene Thompson; George Marion, Jr. (titles)
- Story by: Howard Emmett Rogers
- Produced by: Gregory La Cava; Jesse L. Lasky; Adolph Zukor
- Starring: Bebe Daniels; Richard Arlen; William Powell
- Cinematography: J. Roy Hunt
- Production company: Paramount Pictures
- Distributed by: Paramount Pictures
- Release date: February 26, 1928
- Running time: 86 minutes
- Country: United States
- Language: Silent (English intertitles)

Feel My Pulse is a 1928 American silent comedy film directed by Gregory La Cava and starring Bebe Daniels.

A copy of Feel My Pulse is preserved in the Library of Congress archives.

On January 1, 2024, Feel My Pulse entered the Public domain in the United States.

== Plot ==
Barbara Manning is a wealthy hypochondriac who inherits a sanatorium and finds love and adventure.

== Cast ==
- Bebe Daniels as Barbara Manning
- Richard Arlen as Her Problem
- William Powell as Her Nemesis
- Melbourne MacDowell as Her Uncle Wilberforce
- George Irving as Her Uncle Edgar
- Charles Sellon as Her Sanitarium's Caretaker
- Heinie Conklin as Her Patient
- Harry Cording as Rum Running Boatman (uncredited)
- Guy Oliver as Physician (uncredited)
