= Richard Cromwell (actor) =

American actor (1910–1960)

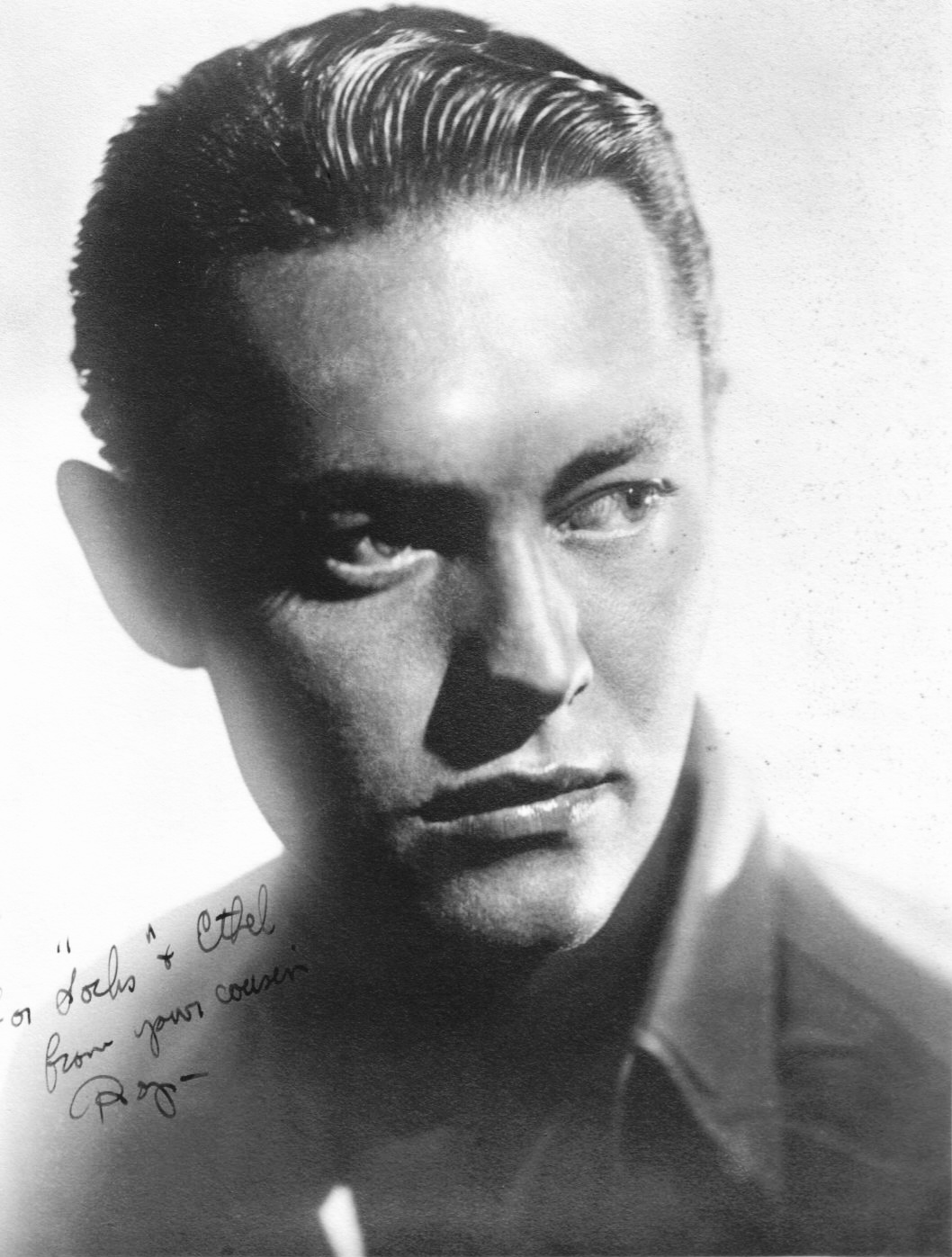
- Autographed photo of Cromwell, c. 1933
- Born: LeRoy Melvin Radabaugh; January 8, 1910; Long Beach, California, U.S.
- Died: October 11, 1960 (aged 50); Hollywood, California, U.S.
- Resting place: Fairhaven Memorial Park, Santa Ana, California
- Other names: Roy Radabaugh
- Occupation: Actor
- Years active: 1930–1948
- Spouse: Angela Lansbury (m. 1945; div. 1946)

Richard Cromwell (born LeRoy Melvin Radabaugh; January 8, 1910 – October 11, 1960) also known as Roy Radabaugh, was an American actor. His career was at its pinnacle with his work in Jezebel (1938) with Bette Davis and Henry Fonda and again with Fonda in John Ford's Young Mr. Lincoln (1939). Cromwell's fame was perhaps first assured in The Lives of a Bengal Lancer (1935), with Gary Cooper and Franchot Tone. That film was the first major effort directed by Henry Hathaway and it was based upon the popular novel by Francis Yeats-Brown. The Lives of a Bengal Lancer earned Paramount Studios a nomination for Best Picture in 1935, though Mutiny on the Bounty instead took the top award at the Academy Awards that year.

In The Filmgoer's Companion, Leslie Halliwell summed up Cromwell's enduring appeal when he described him as "a leading man, [the] gentle hero of early sound films."

== Early life ==
Radabaugh enrolled as a teenager in the Chouinard Art Institute in Los Angeles on a scholarship. He ran a shop in Hollywood where he sold pictures, made lampshades, and designed colour schemes for houses, including "decorating a bathroom for Colleen Moore and designing a house that he rented to Cole Porter."

== Career ==
Radabaugh can be seen in King of Jazz (1930), along with the film's star, Paul Whiteman and his orchestra. On a whim, friends encouraged him to audition in 1930 for the remake of the Richard Barthelmess silent: Tol'able David (1930). Radabaugh won the role over thousands of hopefuls. In storybook fashion, Harry Cohn gave him his screen name and launched his career. Cromwell earned $75 per week for his work on Tol'able David. Noah Beery Sr. and John Carradine co-starred in the film. Later, Cohn signed Cromwell to a multi-year contract based on the strength of his performance and success in his first venture at the box-office. Amidst the flurry of publicity during this period, Cromwell toured the country, even meeting President Herbert Hoover in Washington, D.C.

Cromwell by then had maintained a deep friendship with Marie Dressler, which continued until her death from cancer in 1934. Dressler was nominated for a second Best Actress award for her 1932 portrayal of the title role in Emma. With that film, Dressler personally insisted that her studio bosses cast Cromwell on a loan-out in the lead opposite her. This was another break that helped sustain his rising status in Hollywood. Emma also starred Myrna Loy in one of her earlier screen performances.

Cromwell's next role in 1932 was as Mike in Gregory La Cava's, The Age of Consent, co-starring Eric Linden and Dorothy Wilson. Cromwell is also remembered during this period in Hoop-La (1933), where he is seduced by Clara Bow. Next, the much in demand Cromwell starred in Tom Brown of Culver.

Next up was an early standout performance by Cromwell as the leader of the youth gang in Cecil B. DeMille's now cult-favorite, This Day and Age (1933). To ensure that Cromwell's character used current slang, DeMille asked high school student Horace Hahn to read the script and comment. He starred with Jean Arthur in 1934, in "The Most Precious Thing in Life."

Cromwell's many early pictures were made at Columbia Pictures and elsewhere. Cromwell starred with Will Rogers in Life Begins at 40 for Fox Film Corporation in 1935 and appeared in Poppy in 1936 as the suitor of W.C. Fields' daughter, Rochelle Hudson. In 1937, he portrayed the young bank-robber in love with Helen Mack and on the lam from Lionel Atwill in The Wrong Road.

=== 1940s ===
In the early 1940s, Universal Pictures released Enemy Agent starring Cromwell as a draftsman who thwarts the Nazis. In 1942, he went on to appear in marginal but still watchable fare such as Baby Face Morgan, which co-starred Mary Carlisle.

Cromwell enjoyed a career boost, if not a critically acclaimed performance, in the film adaptation of the hit radio serial: Cosmo Jones, Crime Smasher (1943), opposite Gale Storm. Next up at Monogram Pictures, he was cast as a doctor working covertly for a police department to catch mobsters in the forgettable though endearing Riot Squad, wherein his "fiancée", Rita Quigley, breaks their engagement.

== Personal life ==
Back in California for good, Cromwell was married once, briefly (1945–1946), to actress Angela Lansbury, when she was 19 and Cromwell was 35.

Cromwell made just one statement to the press regarding his wife of nine months and one of her habits: "All over the house, tea bags. In the middle of the night she'd get up and start drinking tea. It nearly drove me crazy."

According to the biography: Angela Lansbury, A Life on Stage and Screen, Lansbury stated in a 1966 interview that her first marriage, "was a mistake" and that she learned from it. She stated, "I wouldn't have not done it", and, "I was too young at 19. [The marriage] shouldn't have happened." Articles based on interviews with Lansbury have stated that Cromwell was gay. Cromwell and Lansbury remained friends until his death in 1960.

== Death and legacy ==
In July 1960, Cromwell signed with producer Maury Dexter for 20th Century Fox's planned production of The Little Shepherd of Kingdom Come, co-starring Jimmie Rodgers, Bob Dix (son of Richard Dix), and Neil Hamilton who replaced Cromwell in the film. Cromwell became ill and died on October 11, 1960, in Hollywood of liver cancer, at the age of 50. He is interred at Fairhaven Memorial Park in Santa Ana, California.

Cromwell's legacy has been preserved by his nephew, Dan Putnam, and his cousin, Bill Keane IV, both of the Conejo Valley in Southern California, as well as the family of his late niece, Joan Radabaugh, of the Central Coast. In 2005, Keane donated materials relating to Cromwell's radio performances to the Thousand Oaks Library's Special Collection, "The American Radio Archive". In 2007, Keane donated memorabilia relating to Cromwell's film career and ceramics work to the AMPAS Margaret Herrick Library in Beverly Hills.

Cromwell was mentioned in Gore Vidal's satirical novel Myra Breckinridge (1968) as "the late Richard Cromwell, so satisfyingly tortured in Lives of a Bengal Lancer".

== Filmography ==
Year	Movie	Role	Other notes
1930	King of Jazz	cowboy (walk-on)	Cromwell can be seen in the Song of the Dawn number.
1930	Tol'able David	David	Directed by John Blystone, starred opposite Noah Beery Sr. Silent star Richard Barthelmess, who gave his blessing to Cromwell's portrayal, was the original David in the 1921 classic directed by Henry King. Gary Cooper was also originally offered this role and very interested but Adolph Zukor at Paramount Pictures refused to loan out his top star to Columbia, then perceived as a "lower-class" studio (according to Larry Swindell's bio of Cooper, The Last Hero, Doubleday, 1980).
1931	Fifty Fathoms Deep	Pinky Caldwell	First of several pairings with Jack Holt for Columbia.
1931	Shanghaied Love	The Boy	Third feature for Columbia, co-starred Sally Blane and again, Noah Beery Sr.
1931	Maker of Men	Bob Dudley	Jack Holt co-starred and a very young Marion Morrison aka John Wayne appeared with his Trojan Football teammates; Gridiron scenes filmed at USC.
1932	The Age of Consent	Mike	Cromwell's first loanout to RKO; this film was directed by Gregory LaCava and was the screen debut, in an uncredited role, for Mildred Shay.
1932	Emma	Ronnie	Cromwell was on loan out to MGM for director Clarence Brown; this production's cast also included Jean Hersholt.
1932	Tom Brown of Culver	Robert Randolph III	Universal's William Wyler directed Cromwell here along with H.B. Warner, Slim Summerville, Tom Brown, Ben Alexander, and Sidney Toler. Also, Tyrone Power's first onscreen appearance is as a bit player in a scene opposite Cromwell in this film.
1932	The Strange Love of Molly Louvain	James "Jimmy" Cook, the bellhop	Director: Michael Curtiz for Warner Bros., with Ann Dvorak, Lee Tracy, Guy Kibbee, and Charles Middleton.
1932	That's My Boy	Tommy Jefferson Scott	Another football flick wherein Cromwell plays opposite Mae Marsh, Dorothy Jordan, and Douglass Dumbrille.
1933	This Day and Age	Steve Smith	For DeMille at Paramount Pictures, Cromwell stars with Charles Bickford and Judith Allen.
1933	Hoop-La	Chris Miller	Directed by Frank Lloyd for Fox pictures. Final major starring role for Clara Bow. Cromwell co-starred with Preston Foster and James Gleason.
1933	Above the Clouds	Dick Robinson	
1934	Carolina	drugstore clerk	Opposite Janet Gaynor, originally entitled: "The House of Connelly".
1934	Most Precious Thing in Life	Chris Kelsey	
1934	Name the Woman	Clem Rogers	
1934	Among the Missing	Tommy aka The Kid	
1934	When Strangers Meet	Paul Tarman	
1935	Life Begins at 40	Lee Austin	Opposite Will Rogers and Rochelle Hudson, this was one of Rogers' last films.
1935	Lives of a Bengal Lancer	Lt. Stone	Cromwell's favorite role.
1935	McFadden's Flats	Sandy MacTavish	
1935	Men of the Hour	Dave Durkin	
1935	Unknown Woman	Larry Condon	
1935	Annapolis Farwell	Boyce Avery	
1935	Star Night at The Cocoanut Grove	as himself	MGM Technicolor Short showing celebs at play in Hollywood. Cromwell is seated at a table with Gary Cooper.
1936	Poppy	Billy Farnsworth	One of many pairings for Cromwell opposite Rochelle Hudson.
1937	Torpedoed	Lt. Bill Armstrong	
1937	The Road Back	Ludwig	Very large cast including Noah Beery Jr.—Cromwell was one of the few actors to work with both Beery Sr. and Jr. Fine camera work was done here by cinematographer John J. Mescall.
1937	The Wrong Road	Jimmy	Cromwell's director here was James Cruze. Other members of the cast were Marjorie Main, Joseph Crehan, Arthur Horst, and Rex Evans. Costumes were by Eloise.
1938	Jezebel	Ted Dillard	Cromwell's second role in a William Wyler-directed film.
1938	Come on, Lethernecks!	Jimmy Butler	
1938	Storm Over Bengal	Neil Allison	
1939	Young Mr. Lincoln	Matt Clay	Henry Fonda, who played Lincoln, was quoted in an interview that he had a professional admiration for the "always dependable Richard Cromwell."
1940	Village Barn Dance	Dan Martin	
1940	Enemy Agent	Jimmy Saunders	Exactly one hour in length, this film has Cromwell in the role of a draftsman who is wrongly accused of crimes perpetrated by Nazi spies. Jack Carson stands out in an early role as a G-Man feigning drunkenness to help thwart the crooks who've stolen aircraft factory blueprints.
1940	The Villain Still Pursued Her	Edward Middleton	Co-starring Buster Keaton, this take-off of the long-running Los Angeles stage hit The Drunkard, also co-starred Margaret Hamilton. It was recently re-released on DVD.
1941	Parachute Battalion	Spence	
1941	Riot Squad	Doctor Tom Brandon	
1942	Baby Face Morgan	Edward "Baby Face" Morgan	This is the best of the several of Cromwell's "B" efforts for PRC. Cromwell's co-star here was Robert Armstrong, of King Kong fame. Cromwell and Armstrong had also worked together in Enemy Agent.
1943	The Crime Smasher	Police Sergeant Pat Flanagan	
1948	Bungalow 13	Patrick Macy	Cromwell's comeback that never was.

== Bibliography ==
- Blum, Daniel. Screen World, 1961, Chilton Company, Philadelphia, New York, 1961.
- Cary, Diana Serra. Jackie Coogan—The World's Boy King, Scarecrow Press, Lanham, Maryland, 2003.
- Crivello, Kirk. "Richard Cromwell--A Memoir and A Filmography", article in Filmograph, Vol. IV, No. 4, Orlean, Virginia, (likely mid-1970s).
- Edelman, Rob and Audrey Kupferberg. Angela Lansbury, A Life on Stage and Screen, Birch Lane Press, New York, 1996.
- [Editors, various]. Cut! Hollywood Murders, Accidents and Other Tragedies, Barron's Press, Hauppauge, N.Y., 2006.
- [Editors, various]. Picture Show Annual for 1932, Amalgamated Press LTD., The Fleetway House, London, 1932.
- Higham, Charles. Cecil B. DeMille: A Biography . . ., Charles Scribner's Sons, New York, 1973.
- Isherwood, Christopher. Lost Years, A Memoir 1945–1951, Vintage Books, Division of Random House, London (Copyright Don Bachardy), 2000.
- Lamparski, Richard. Hollywood Diary—Twelve Untold Tales . . ., BearManor Media, Albany, Georgia, 2006.
- Lee, Betty. Marie Dressler: The Unlikeliest Star, The University Press of Kentucky, Lexington, 1997.
- Morino, Marianne. The Hollywood Walk of Fame, Ten Speed Press, Berkeley, 1987.
- Palmer, Paul R. "Richard Cromwell", article in Film Fan Monthly, No. 167 (Leonard Maltin, Editor), Teaneck, New Jersey, May 1975.
- Vermilye, Jerry. The Films of the Thirties, Citadel Press, Secaucus, New Jersey, 1982.
- Vidal, Gore. Myra Breckinridge, Little, Brown, & Co., Boston, Toronto, 1968.
