= Speed to Spare (1937 film) =

- Theatrical release poster
- Directed by: Lambert Hillyer
- Screenplay by: Bert Granet; Lambert Hillyer
- Produced by: Irving Briskin; Ralph Cohn
- Starring: Charles Quigley; Dorothy Wilson; Eddie Nugent
- Cinematography: Benjamin Kline
- Edited by: Viola Lawrence
- Production company: Columbia Pictures
- Distributed by: Columbia Pictures
- Release date: 4 May 1937
- Running time: 60 minutes
- Country: United States
- Language: English

Speed to Spare is a 1937 sports film directed by Lambert Hillyer. It was produced by Columbia Pictures.

== Cast ==
- Charles Quigley as Tommy Morton
- Dorothy Wilson as Eileen Hart
- Eddie Nugent as "Skids" Brannigan
- Patricia Farr as Peaches Davis
- Gene Morgan as Breakaway Wilson
- John Gallaudet as Dan Kelly
- Gordon Elliott as Steve Fellows
- Jack Gardner as Ralph Bennett
- Lester Dorr as Otto Behrman
- Arthur Aylesworth as Kennedy

== Reception ==
A review in the New York Daily News called the film "spirited", and "thrilling".
