= Strangers of the Evening =

1932 film

- A poster bearing the film's American reissue title: The Hidden Corpse
- Directed by: H. Bruce Humberstone
- Written by: Stuart Anthony; Warren Duff
- Based on: The Illustrious Corpse novel by Tiffany Thayer
- Produced by: Samuel Bischoff
- Starring: ZaSu Pitts; Lucien Littlefield; Eugene Pallette
- Cinematography: Arthur Edeson
- Edited by: David Berg; Martin G. Cohn
- Music by: Val Burton
- Distributed by: Tiffany Pictures
- Release date: May 15, 1932
- Running time: 70 minutes
- Country: United States
- Language: English

Strangers of the Evening (reissued as The Hidden Corpse) is a 1932 American pre-Code mystery film produced by Samuel Bischoff for Tiffany Pictures, directed by H. Bruce Humberstone, and starring ZaSu Pitts, Lucien Littlefield and Eugene Pallette. Based on Tiffany Thayer's novel The Illustrious Corpse, the screenplay was adapted by Stuart Anthony and Warren Duff.

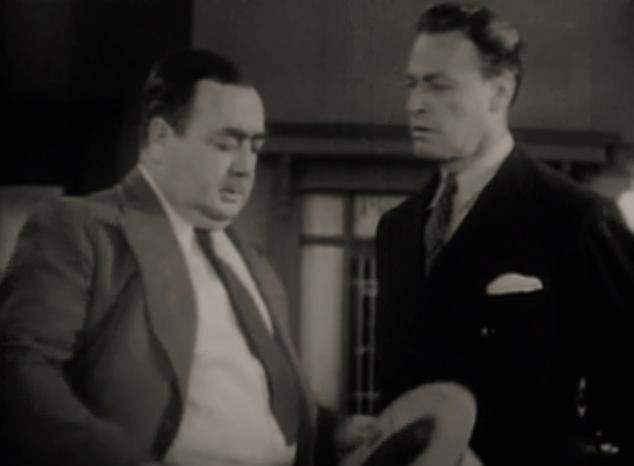
Eugene Pallette and Mahlon Hamilton

== Plot ==
The body of what appears to be lawyer and aspiring politician Clark C. McNaughton is brought to the Chandler Undertaking Parlor which is on 52nd Street, his face mangled from a car accident, but it is really the body of a man called Jack Lee who died in a car accident. It will be novice nineteen year old undertaker Tommy Freeman's (Harold Waldridge) first solo job. and he's very apprehensive. Dr. Joseph Chandler (Warner Richmond), is the owner of the establishment, but he and his accomplices are trying to avoid an investigation, since McNaughton actually died of a gunshot wound having been shot by Lee in an argument. Tommy has a bad feeling about the case, so he tells Dr. Raymond Everette (Theodore von Eltz) that he's going out for "coffee" so he can delay the embalming. Shortly after, Everette's fiancée Ruth (Miriam Seegar) stops in for a visit. Feeling like she is being followed by her father, Frank Daniels (Lucien Littlefield), she says she can't stay long. Daniels, who has indeed been following her, confronts Everette and warns him to stay away from his daughter. Ruth, who has been hiding in another room, leaves the back way and hails a taxi cab just as Tommy returns to discover that Dr. Everette is leaving as well. He and Ruth are planning on eloping.

Two passersby discover what appears to be a dead man laying in the alley nearby and decide to deliver him to the undertaker. Tommy warns them they should've called the cops instead of bringing him there, but the two men leave and after some discussion decide to tell a cop anyway. The cop knocks on the door, startling already skittish Tommy, then the cop tries to go after the two men who brought the body there but is unable to find them. Meanwhile the second body starts to move, and a frightened Tommy runs from the building. Later two cops arrive to collect the body of the dead man found in the alley but no one is at the undertakers, so they take the only body there, Lee's body, which is the one being passed off as McNaughton.

The next day the newspaper headlines announce that Frank Daniels has been found dead, his face mangled beyond recognition, which prompts a murder investigation and a search for the two men, as well as a search for Tommy, Ruth and Dr. Everette. Chandler phones his accomplice and advises him that he had to bury McNaughton in his own casket since Lee's body is now missing. Days later Dr. Everette and Ruth read in the news that they are wanted for the murder of Daniels and that they have been traced to a Chicago hotel, but the pair leave quickly after seeing two cops knocking on their hotel door.

A man with amnesia, who is really Frank Daniels, stops by the police station and tells Detective Brubacher (Eugene Pallette) that he knows about a murder on 52nd Street, but can't seem to remember anything about it. After questioning Daniels he finds out that the man is living on 84th Street with a nice lady named Sybil. The other detective gives him the name of Richard Roe, and has Sybil brought in for questioning.

Sybil tells Brubacher that she found Richard/Daniels on 52nd Street wearing nothing but a raincoat and that she brought him home with her, got him some clothes, and has been taking care of him ever since. Everette is determined to find out the truth to clear his name and Ruth's, he goes back to the undertaker's and talks to Chandler, who doesn't know much and what he does know he isn't sharing. Everette sees McNaughton's bloody clothes in Chandler's desk drawer, but Chandler warns him to mind his own business. Everette then goes to Sybil's to look at the raincoat Richard was found in and discovers that it belonged to Tommy, and that there's a slip of paper with an address on it. Next he goes to visit Tommy who is hiding out at a friend's apartment in Philadelphia, Tommy tells him he ran when the body started to move.

The cops exhume what they believe to be Daniels' body, but Chandler sees the body and claims that it is McNaughton's body, however Daniels' uncle (Tully Marshall) claims it isn't his nephew, in spite of the mangled face. The district attorney gives the okay to exhume McNaughton's body, but Chandler and his men get there first. Everette intercepts and arranges to deliver the body, Chandler and his men to Brubacher and the district attorney. A short while later Frank Daniels appears at the police station, Ruth recognizes him, and she and Everette are cleared.

== Cast ==
- ZaSu Pitts as Sybil Smith
- Eugene Pallette as Detective Brubacher
- Lucien Littlefield as Frank "Snookie" Daniels aka Richard Roe
- Tully Marshall as Robert Daniels
- Miriam Seegar as Ruth Daniels
- Theodore von Eltz as Dr. Raymond Everette
- Warner Richmond as Dr. Joseph Chandler
- Harold Waldridge as Tommy Freeman
- Mahlon Hamilton as Charles E. Frisbee, Deputy District Attorney
- Alan Roscoe as Sutherland
- William Scott as Passerby
- Francis Sayles as Roberts
