= Men of the Night (1926 film) =

1926 film directed by Albert S. Rogell

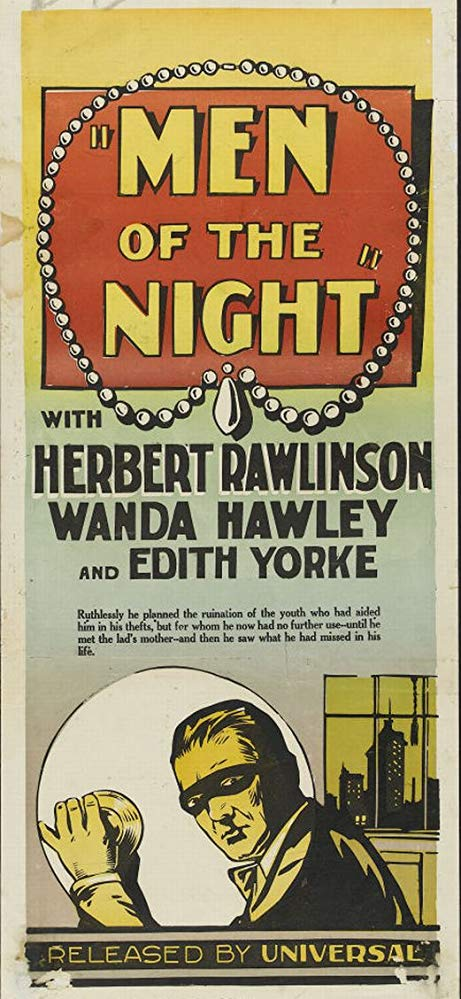
- Directed by: Albert S. Rogell
- Written by: Lucille De Nevers (adaptation)
- Based on: "Men of the Night" by Florence Wagner
- Produced by: Sterling Pictures
- Starring: Herbert Rawlinson
- Distributed by: Sterling Pictures
- Release date: June 1926
- Running time: 6 reels
- Country: United States
- Language: Silent (English intertitles)

Men of the Night is a 1926 American silent crime film directed by Albert S. Rogell and starring Herbert Rawlinson. It was produced and distributed by independent film producer Sterling Pictures.

== Plot ==
As described in the press sheet for the film, Mrs. Abbott, an elderly woman, is turned out by her landlady because she cannot pay the rent. In urgent need of money, she consents to sell to her landlady a miniature with a picture of her grandmother with which she had previously refused to part. To make a living, Mrs. Abbott sells newspapers. She is accosted one night by Rupert Dodds, an art dealer, and Dick Foster, his young companion. Dodds sees her transparent honesty an excellent shield to the illegal activities in their art shop. In reality they are thieves who melt down gold and silver articles they obtain. Working in the shop is Trixie Moran, the bookkeeper with whom Dick is in love, and Thomas Bogen, who melts the jewelry. Dick takes to calling Mrs. Abbott "Mother" and she calls him "Son." She grows to love the youth and he is fond of her. Sales in the antique shop pickup fifty per cent due to Mrs. Abbott. Among its customers is Lady Broderick, who invites Dodds to visit her and see her collection of jades. Mrs. Abbott first sees that Dodds and Dick are thieves after she diverts the suspicions of the police and then overhears the two laughing to each other. Her former landlady sells to Bogen the miniature, and he asks $100 to part with it. Dick buys and gives it to her, further cementing her interest in him and his love for Trixie. Trixie, however, while fond of him, spurns his affections because he is under Dodds' thumb. Dodds himself has some interest in Trixie. Mrs. Abbott discovers that they are planning to rob the Broderick house, and she follows to rescue the young man. She arrives just as Dodds has opened the safe, and compels him, under the threat of screaming, to put back the gems. She finds that he had kept one package, which she takes and returns to the safe, but the lights come on and she is captured by the butler, seemingly in the act of robbing it. Dick escapes. The butler also makes her put the miniature that Dick had given her in the safe. The police arrest her, and she is tried and convicted when Dick and Trixie appear, after Dick had turned against Dodds because he would have let the old woman go to prison. Disck confesses and clears Mrs. Abbott. The judge believes Dick has now gone straight and allows him to go free. Through the miniature held by Lady Broderick, it is discovered that Mrs. Abbott is her long-lost sister and heir to a fortune in England. Disk and Trixie quickly marry at Mrs. Abbott's suggestion, she adopts him, and she accompanies them on their honeymoon to England where she will claim her fortune.

== Cast ==
- Herbert Rawlinson as J. Rupert Dodds
- Gareth Hughes'' as Dick Foster
- Wanda Hawley as Trixie Moran
- Lucy Beaumont as Mrs. Abbott
- Jay Hunt as Thomas Bogen
- Mathilde Brundage as Lady Broderick (credited as Mathilda Brundage)

== Preservation ==
A print of Men of the Night is preserved in the Library of Congress collection.
