= His Nibs (film) =

1921 film

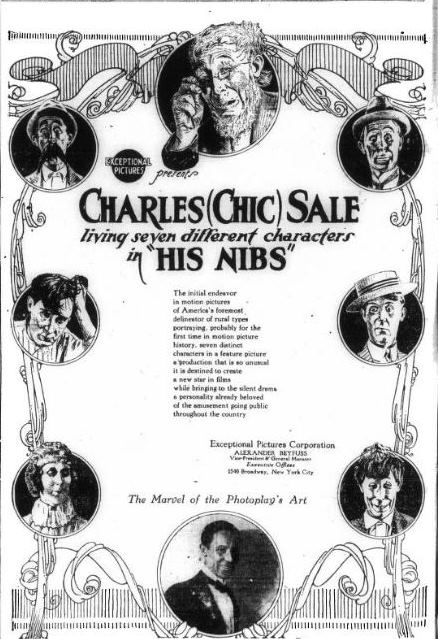
- Advertisement
- Directed by: Gregory La Cava
- Written by: Arthur Hoerl (intertitles and screenplay)
- Starring: Charles 'Chic' Sale; Colleen Moore; Joseph Dowling; J. P. Lockney
- Edited by: Arthur Hoerl
- Production company: Exceptional Pictures
- Distributed by: "His Nibs" Syndicate
- Release date: October 1921
- Country: United States
- Language: Silent (English intertitles)

His Nibs is a 1921 American comedy film directed by Gregory La Cava and starring Chic Sale and Colleen Moore.

== Plot ==
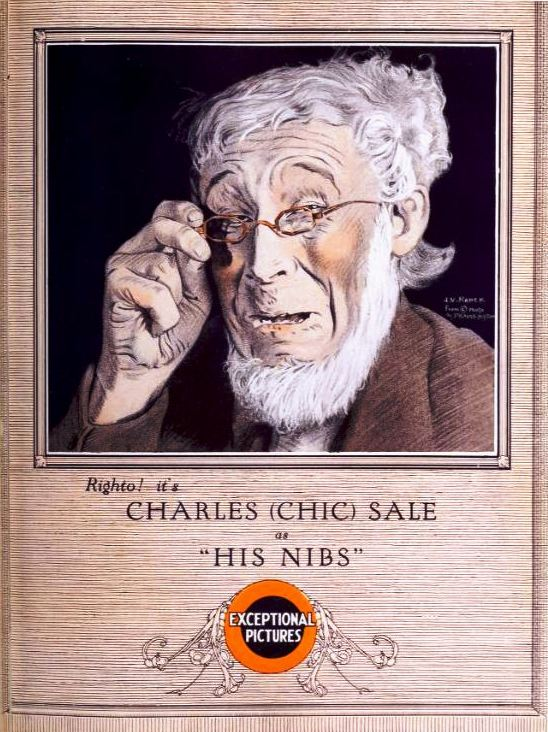
His Nibs ad, 1921

The Slippery Elm Picture Palace screens the film He Fooled ’Em All as various rural characters watch. The owner, operator, and projectionist is "His Nibs". He tells the audience that he has cut the titles from the film but will explain the action. "The Boy" (Sale) leaves a small town in the film-within-the-film to get rich in the city, but he is swindled out of his money, his clothes are stolen, and he is forced to become a dishwasher to pay his rent.

"The Girl" (Moore) and The Girl's father (Dowling) are talked into visiting the city by a swindler, but luckily they end up at the hotel where "The Boy" is working, and he disrupts the plot. All this is explained by "His Nibs" as the film shows, "His Nibs" offering his own commentary on the action as the story advances. Having eliminated the customary happy ending, "His Nibs" tells the audience that The Boy and The Girl got married just the same.

== Cast ==
- Charles "Chic" Sale as The Boy, Theodore Bender, "His Nibs"/Miss Dessie Teed, theater organist/Wally Craw, local weather prophet/Mr. Percifer, editor of The Weekly Bee/Elmer Bender/Peelee Gear Jr., boy tenor)
- Colleen Moore as The Girl
- Joseph Dowling as The Girl's father
- J. P. Lockney as Old Sour Apples
- Walt Whitman as The Boy's Father
- Lydia Yeamans Titus as The Boy's Mother
- Harry Edwards as First Villain

== Background ==
The background of this film is complicated and unclear. The film was originally based on a short story, "The Smart Aleck", by Irvin S. Cobb from The Saturday Evening Post, a story of a small-town wit that travels to the big city and finds himself out of his depth. His Nibs started life as The Smart Aleck, a vehicle for Charles 'Chic' Sale, a popular comedian popular in the 1920s for his caricatures of rural 'hick' characters... a “rural protean comedian” according to the New York Tribune. Filmed between March and May 1920, The Smart Aleck was very different in style and form when it was released some time later as His Nibs.

It is possible that, in its original form, the film was poorly received, and rather than start over from scratch the existing film was re-edited and a new framing story was shot around the existing material. The original The Smart Aleck appears to have been a spoof of the popular story of the young, unspoiled man who goes to the city, fights off temptation and manages to save his sweetheart in the end. That format of film was still very popular at the time, and as Chic Sale was best known for his great variety of caricatures, it is possible that playing only one character ("The Boy," in the best D.W. Griffith style) was poorly received. If this was the case, then The Smart Aleck is the story upon which His Nibs is based. This theory has been suggested by film historian Richard Koszarski.

The film The Smart Aleck is presented as a film-within-the-film (retitled He Fooled 'Em All). The new, framing story consists of Sales playing most of the parts himself, including the spinster organist but chiefly as the projectionist, who has cut the title cards from the film so he can give the audience his own interpretation.

Moore's work on this film overlapped with her work on the drama When Dawn Came (1920). His Nibs was her second Robertson-Cole film, the first being The Devil's Claim (1920).

== Preservation status ==
Preserved by UCLA Film and Television Archive.

== Bibliography ==
- Jeff Codori (2012), Colleen Moore; A Biography of the Silent Film Star, McFarland Publishing, Print ISBN 978-0-7864-4969-9, EBook ISBN 978-0-7864-8899-5
