= Frank Dexter =

German-American director

- Born: February 2, 1882; German Empire
- Died: January 29, 1965 (aged 82); Los Angeles, California; United States
- Occupation: Art director
- Years active: 1931 - 1949 (film)

Frank Dexter (1882–1965) was a German-born American art director.

== Selected filmography ==
- Damaged Goods (1937)
- Drums of Destiny (1937)
- Raw Timber (1937)
- Fugitive Lady (1938)
- My Old Kentucky Home (1938)
- Girl from Rio (1939)
- Rubber Racketeers (1942)
- The Gay Amigo (1949)
- Amazon Quest (1949)

== Bibliography ==
- Gevinson, Alan. Within Our Gates: Ethnicity in American Feature Films, 1911-1960. University of California Press, 1997.
