= Drums of Destiny =

1937 film

- Directed by: Ray Taylor
- Written by: Roger Whately; John T. Neville
- Produced by: E.B. Derr; Frank Melford
- Starring: Tom Keene; Edna Lawrence; Budd Buster
- Cinematography: Arthur Martinelli
- Edited by: Finn Ulback
- Music by: Abe Meyer
- Production company: Crescent Pictures
- Distributed by: Crescent Pictures
- Release date: June 12, 1937
- Running time: 62 minutes
- Country: United States
- Language: English

Drums of Destiny is a 1937 American Western film directed by Ray Taylor and starring Tom Keene, Edna Lawrence and Budd Buster.

It sometimes confused with the 1937 film Old Louisiana also made by Crescent and starring Keene, which was originally known by this title.

The film's sets were designed by the art director Frank Dexter.

== Plot ==
Following the War of 1812 a force of American troops are raised to combat Spanish-led Indian attacks from Spanish Florida.

== Cast ==
- Tom Keene as Capt. Jerry Crawford
- Edna Lawrence as Rosa Maria Dominguez
- Budd Buster as Kentuck
- Ray Bennett as Jenkins
- Robert Fiske as Bill Holston
- Carlos De Valdez as Don Salvador Dominguez
- David Sharp as Lt. Bill Crawford
- John Merton as Toby Simmons
- Ray Jones as Renegade
- Chief Flying Cloud as Indian
- Henry Hall as Pa Green
- Chief Many Treaties as Indian
- Aurora Navarro as Rosa Maria's Duenna
- Artie Ortego as Indian
- Marin Sais as Ma Green
- Charles Unger as Johnny Green

== See also ==
- Florida Western

== Bibliography ==
- Gevinson, Alan. Within Our Gates: Ethnicity in American Feature Films, 1911-1960. University of California Press, 1997.
