= The Glory Trail =

1936 film directed by Lynn Shores

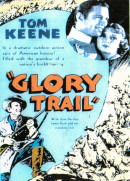
- Poster for the film
- Directed by: Lynn Shores
- Written by: John Thomas Neville
- Produced by: E. B. Derr
- Starring: Tom Keene; Joan Barclay; E. H. Calvert
- Cinematography: Arthur Martinelli
- Edited by: Donald Barratt
- Music by: Abe Meyer
- Production company: Crescent Pictures
- Release date: September 15, 1936 (US)
- Running time: 70 minutes
- Country: United States
- Language: English

The Glory Trail is a 1936 American Western film. Directed by Lynn Shores, the film stars Tom Keene, Joan Barclay, and E. H. Calvert. It was released on September 15, 1936.

== Cast ==
- Tom Keene as Captain John Morgan
- Joan Barclay as Lucy Strong
- E. H. Calvert as Colonel Strong
- Frank Melton as Lieutenant Gilchrist
- William Royle as Captain Fetterman
- Walter Long as Riley
- Allen Greer as Indian Joe
- William Crowell as Wainwright
- Harve Foster as Hampton
- Ann Hovey as Julie Morgan
- John Lester Johnson as Toby
- Etta McDaniel as Mandy
- James Bush as David Kirby

== See also ==
- List of films and television shows about the American Civil War
