= E.B. Derr =

American film producer

- Born: Edward Bennett Derr; 20 May 1891; West Bethlehem, Pennsylvania, United States
- Died: 13 August 1974 (aged 83); Los Angeles, California, United States
- Occupation: Producer
- Years active: 1930–1943

Edward Bennett Derr (May 20, 1891 – August 13, 1974) was an American film producer during the genesis of the sound era. Born in West Bethlehem, Pennsylvania in 1891, he would produce almost forty films in the 1930s and early 1940s. Derr retired from the film industry in 1943, after co-producing The Deerslayer, for which he also wrote the screenplay adaptation from the James Fenimore Cooper's novel, The Deerslayer: Or, the First War-Path, A Tale.

== Filmography ==
(as per AFI's database)

Year	Title	Role	Notes
1930	Big Money	Producer	
1930	Her Man	Producer	
1930	Holiday	Producer	
1930	Night Work	Producer	
1930	Pardon My Gun	Producer	
1930	Sin Takes a Holiday	Producer	
1930	Swing High	Producer	
1931	Beyond Victory	Producer	
1931	Lonely Wives	Producer	
1931	The Painted Desert	Producer	
1932	Scarface	Producer	
1932	Sky Devils	Producer	Produced underlying film which was recut into Sky Devils
1936	Rebellion	Producer	
1936	The Glory Trail	Producer	
1937	Drums of Destiny	Producer	
1937	Old Louisiana	Producer	
1937	County Fair	Producer	
1937	The Law Commands	Producer	
1937	Raw Timber	Producer	
1937	Battle of Greed	Producer	
1937	Under Strange Flags	Producer	
1938	Female Fugitive	Producer	
1938	Gang Bullets	Producer	
1938	My Old Kentucky Home	Producer	
1938	Barefoot Boy	Producer	
1938	Numbered Woman	Producer	
1938	I Am a Criminal	Producer	
1939	Girl from Rio	Producer	
1939	Star Reporter	Producer	
1939	Should a Girl Marry?	Producer	
1939	Undercover Agent	Producer	
1939	Convict's Code	Producer	
1941	Criminals Within	Producer	
1941	Battle of Greed	Producer	
1941	Secret Evidence	Producer	
1943	Deerslayer	Producer, screenplay	
