= Undercover Agent =

1939 film directed by Howard Bretherton

- Title card for the film
- Directed by: Howard Bretherton
- Screenplay by: Milton Raison
- Story by: Martin Mooney
- Produced by: E. B. Derr
- Starring: Russell Gleason; Shirley Deane; J. M. Kerrigan
- Cinematography: Arthur Martinelli
- Edited by: Howard Dillinger; Russell Schoengarth
- Music by: Abe Meyer
- Production company: Crescent Pictures
- Distributed by: Monogram Pictures
- Release date: April 5, 1939 (US)
- Running time: 56 minutes
- Country: United States
- Language: English

Undercover Agent is a 1939 American drama film directed by Howard Bretherton and starring Russell Gleason, Shirley Deane, and J. M. Kerrigan. It was released on April 5, 1939.

== Cast ==
- Russell Gleason as William Trent
- Shirley Deane as Betty Madison
- J. M. Kerrigan as Thomas "Pop" Madison
- Maude Eburne as Mrs. Minnow
- Oscar O'Shea as Pat Murphy
- Ralf Harolde as Bartel
- Selmer Jackson as Graham
- Ray Bennett as Pussyfoot
- Ralph Sanford as Joe Blake
