= Convict's Code =

1939 film by Lambert Hillyer

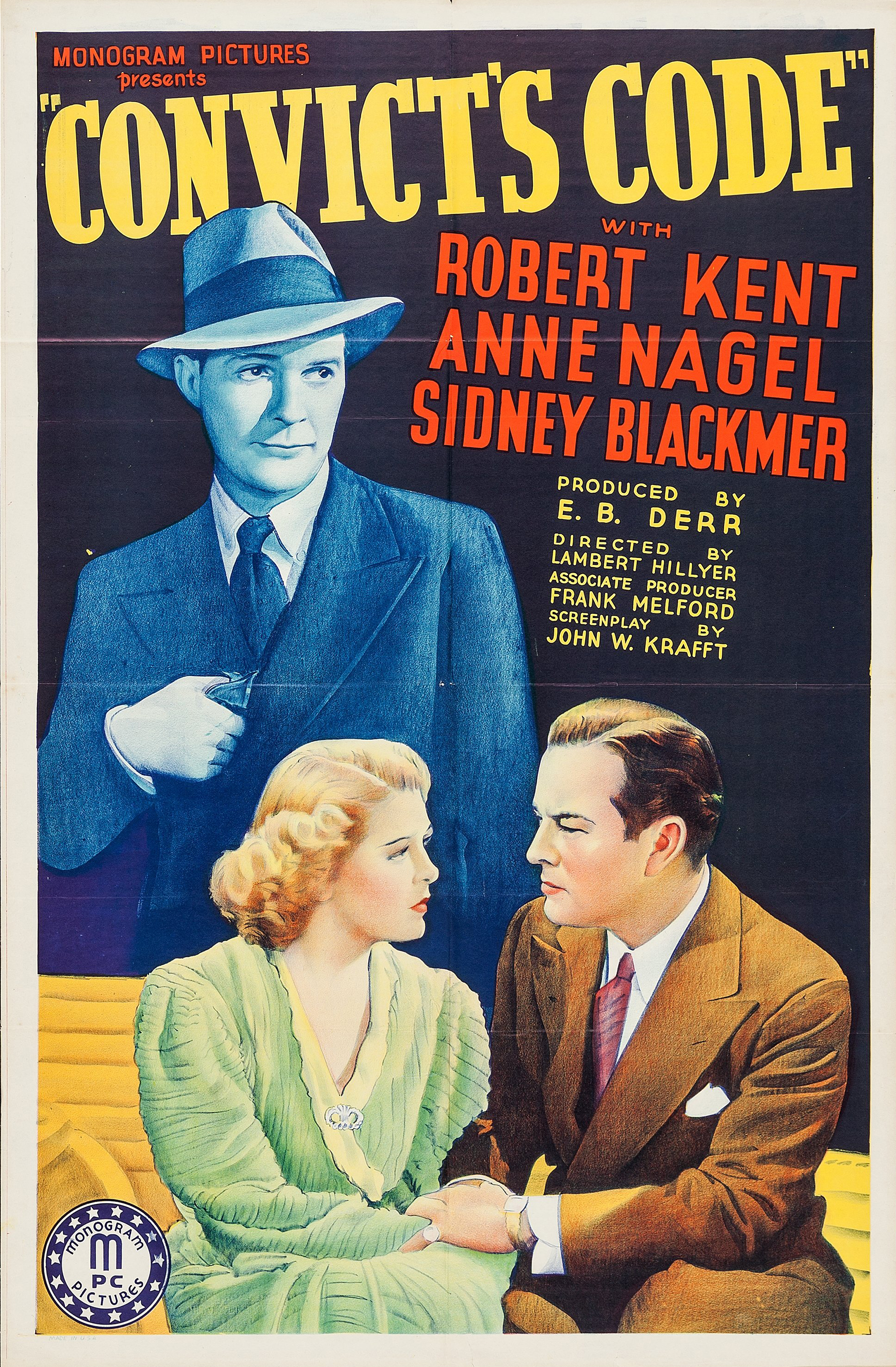
- Theatrical release poster
- Directed by: Lambert Hillyer
- Written by: John W. Krafft
- Produced by: E.B. Derr (producer); Frank Melford (associate producer)
- Starring: Robert Kent; Anne Nagel; Sidney Blackmer
- Cinematography: Arthur Martinelli
- Edited by: Russell F. Schoengarth
- Music by: Abe Meyer
- Distributed by: Monogram Pictures
- Release date: January 18, 1939
- Running time: 62 minutes
- Country: United States
- Language: English

Convict's Code is a 1939 American film directed by Lambert Hillyer.

== Plot ==
On parole after three years in prison, a football player encounters the man who had framed him.

== Cast ==
- Robert Kent as Dave Tyler
- Anne Nagel as Julie Warren
- Sidney Blackmer as Gregory Warren
- Victor Kilian as Bennett
- Norman Willis as Russell
- Maude Eburne as Mrs. Magruder
- Ben Alexander as Jeff Palmer
- Pat Flaherty as Sniffy
- Carleton Young as Pete Jennings
- Howard C. Hickman as Warden
- Joan Barclay as Elaine
- Harry Strang as Tom Lynch
