= Confidential (1935 film) =

1935 film by Edward L. Cahn

- Directed by: Edward L. Cahn
- Screenplay by: Wellyn Totman; Olive Cooper
- Story by: Scott Darling; John Rathmell
- Produced by: Nat Levine
- Starring: Donald Cook; Evalyn Knapp; Theodore von Eltz; Warren Hymer; J. Carrol Naish; Herbert Rawlinson
- Cinematography: Jack A. Marta; Ernest Miller
- Edited by: Ray Curtiss
- Production company: Mascot Pictures
- Distributed by: Mascot Pictures
- Release date: October 16, 1935
- Running time: 65 minutes
- Country: United States
- Language: English

Confidential is a 1935 American crime film directed by Edward L. Cahn and written by Wellyn Totman and Olive Cooper. The film stars Donald Cook, Evalyn Knapp, Theodore von Eltz, Warren Hymer, J. Carrol Naish and Herbert Rawlinson. The film was released on October 16, 1935, by Mascot Pictures.

== Plot ==
The plot surrounds a gang which is plotting to take over all of the number's rackets in the city. The mastermind of the gang J. W. Keaton played by Herbert Rawlinson introduces the gang’s new push to expand in the opening scene. FBI Agent Dave Elliot played by Donald Cook is assigned to investigate and find the elusive mastermind by Inspector Arthur R. Preston played by Clay Clement. To accomplish this, he makes contact with a number's runner, “Midget” Regan, and joins the gang. There is a three-way romantic triangle by Dave Elliot, the gang’ bookkeeper, Maxine Travers, played by Evelyn Knapp, and “midget” Regan played by Warren Hymer. Hymer supplies a lot of comic relief to the story. J. Carrol Naish as “Lefty” Tate is the violent gang member.

== Cast ==
- Donald Cook as FBI Agent Dave Elliott
- Evalyn Knapp as Maxine Travers
- Theodore von Eltz as Mr. Walsh
- Warren Hymer as 'Midget' Regan
- J. Carrol Naish as 'Lefty' Tate
- Herbert Rawlinson as J.W. Keaton
- Kane Richmond as J.W. 'Jack' Keaton, Jr.
- Guy Edward Hearn as Insp. Stone
- James P. Burtis as Lacey
- Clay Clement as Insp. Arthur M. Preston
- Reed Howes as FBI Agent Bob Arnold
- Morgan Wallace as H. Van Cleve
- Monte Carter as Giuseppe Tomasso Giaconelli
- Al Bridge as Hanover
- Earl Eby as FBI Agent Nash
- Lynton Brent as FBI Agent Connors
- George Chesebro as Sardo
- Mary Gwynne as Woman
- Frank Marlowe as G-Man
- Lillian Castle as Mary
- Donald Kerr as Reporter
- Edwin Argus as Character
- Jack Gustin as Henchman
- David Worth as FBI Agent
- Allen Connor as Official
- Tom Brower as Elderly Man
- Harry Harvey, Sr. as Short Pool Player
- Robert Homans as Fat Pool Player
- Allan Cavan as One of Keaton's Lieutenants
- Earl Dwire as Secretary
- John Ince as One of Keaton's Lieutenants
- Lee Phelps as One of Keaton's Lieutenants

== Critical reception ==
Motion Picture Herald described the film as "An effective version of the current cycle of G-Man production", and wrote, "With a modicum of comedy and romance this is chiefly melodrama and altogether convincing."
