= Adventure in Sahara =

1938 film

- Film poster
- Directed by: D. Ross Lederman
- Written by: Maxwell Shane; Samuel Fuller
- Starring: Paul Kelly
- Cinematography: Franz Planer
- Edited by: Otto Meyer
- Distributed by: Columbia Pictures
- Release date: November 15, 1938
- Running time: 60 minutes
- Country: United States
- Language: English

Adventure in Sahara is a 1938 American adventure film directed by D. Ross Lederman and starring Paul Kelly.

== Plot ==
Jim Wilson receives a telegram that his brother, who served in the French Foreign Legion has died. He decides to join the Legion and requests to be assigned to a particular commander, Savatt. The Legion is walking to their next outpost when they find a soldier who quickly dies, but manages to tell them he deserted and had no choice.

The new commander Savatt is clearly abusive and enjoys humiliating his men. One of the men is ill and tries to hit Savatt with a shovel. The man collapses and dies. Savatt orders the men on a long march. As they return to the fort, the Arabs are attacking. The Arabs retreat.

One of the soldiers is punished with constant patrol on the wall. Jim accuses Savatt of killing the soldier. He is arrested and placed in solitary confinement. One of the men sneaks him food. Jim returns to his bunk once the punishment is over. A patrol is sent out and Jim is included, although he is weak. They spot a plane but the Arabs arrive there first. The Legion arrives in time to save the pilot, who is Jim's fiancé, Carla Preston. Savatt tells Jim that he will stand duty at the wall all day, due to his disrespect to Carla, as interpreted by Savatt.

The men decide to mutiny and take the lieutenant to the guardhouse. They enter Savatt's quarters and take him prisoner. They give the officers a choice to follow them or Savatt. They chose to stay with Savatt. They are given food and water for 150 km, with the nearest fort 700 km away, and told to march into the desert. One of the men forges the lieutenant's signature on orders to obtain supplies for them. Two of the men dress as Arabs and leave with the orders.

Carla discovers what Jim has done and that he will be court-martialed. Savatt's men begin to die. However, Savatt kills an Arab and dresses like him. He arrives at the next fort and reports the mutiny. Karnoldi arrives at Carla's quarters. She fights him off as Jim arrives.

The men talk about rebelling and taking the supplies, but the Legionnaires arrive with Savatt. The Arabs arrive and attack the Legionaires outside the fort, where they will be massacred. Jim orders the men to open the gates to let them in. Jim's men and the Legionnaires join forces to defeat the Arabs.

The men who rebelled are put on trial. The lieutenant testifies for the men, and accuses Savatt of multiple crimes. The men are sentenced to four months in prison, and will be discharged from the service. Jim tells Carla he has to serve the 4 months. She tells him she'll be there when he gets out.

== Cast ==
- Paul Kelly as Jim Wilson
- C. Henry Gordon as Capt. Savatt
- Lorna Gray as Carla Preston
- Robert Fiske as Lt. Dumond
- Marc Lawrence as Poule
- Dick Curtis as Karnoldi
- Stanley Brown as René Malreaux
- Al Bridge as Cpl. Dronov (as Alan Bridge)
- Ray Bennett as Ladoux (as Raphael Bennett)
- Charles R. Moore as Gungadin (as Charles Moore)
- Dwight Frye as Gravet, 'the Jackal'
- Stanley Andrews as Col. Rancreux
