= Gang Bullets =

1938 American film directed by Lambert Hillyer

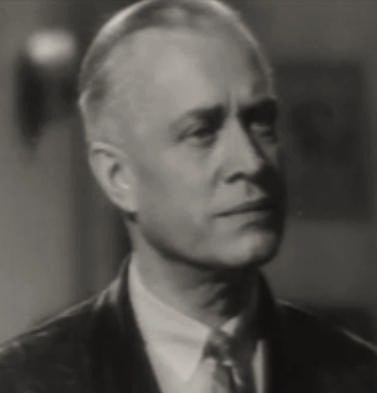
- Charles Trowbridge in the film
- Directed by: Lambert Hillyer
- Written by: John T. Neville
- Produced by: E.B. Derr (producer); Frank Melford (associate producer)
- Starring: See below
- Cinematography: Arthur Martinelli
- Edited by: Russell F. Schoengarth
- Distributed by: Monogram Pictures
- Release date: November 10, 1938
- Running time: 63 minutes
- Country: United States
- Language: English

Gang Bullets is a 1938 American crime drama film directed by Lambert Hillyer.

The film is also known as The Crooked Way in the United Kingdom.

== Plot summary ==
A ruthless but clever gangster who knows every loophole in the law has the tables turned by a dedicated district attorney and his assistant.

== Cast ==
- Anne Nagel as Patricia Wayne
- Robert Kent as Asst. Dist. Atty. John Carter
- Charles Trowbridge as Dist. Atty. Dexter Wayne
- Morgan Wallace as 'Big Bill' Anderson
- J. Farrell MacDonald as Police Chief Mike Reardon
- John T. Murray as Horace Meade
- Joseph Crehan as Jim Wallace
- Benny Bartlett as Billy Jones
- John Merton as Red Hampton, Henchman
- Roger Williams as George Stanley, Henchman
- John Dilson as Police Commissioner R. D. Brown
- Donald Kerr as Joe Armstrong, Henchman

== See also ==
- Turner Classic Movies
- You Tube
- Archive
