= Robert Fiske (actor) =

American actor (1889–1944)

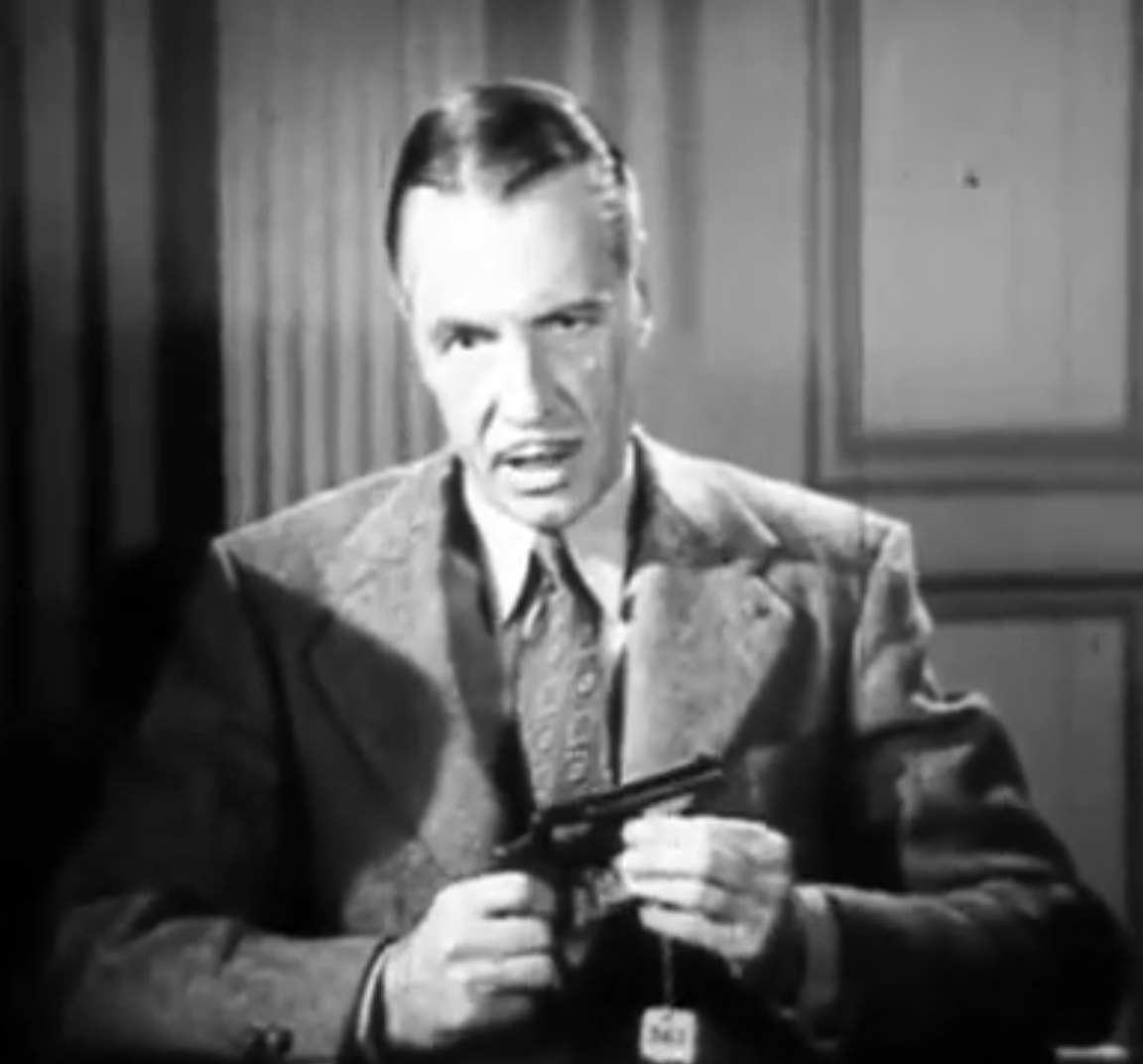
- Fiske in Today I Hang (1942)
- Born: Robert Lawrence Fiske; October 20, 1889
- Died: September 12, 1944 (aged 54); Sunland, California, U.S.
- Resting place: Forest Lawn Memorial Park, Glendale, California
- Occupation: Actor
- Years active: 1936–1944

Robert Fiske (October 20, 1889 – September 12, 1944) was an American actor on film and stage during the first half of the 20th century.

In the late 1920s, Fiske acted with the Sharp Players at the Pitt Theater in Pittsburgh, Pennsylvania. By the early 1930s, he had his own troupe in Pennsylvania.

Robert Fiske appeared in 66 films, primarily low-budget features, and usually wore a dapper, pencil-thin mustache. He joined the Columbia Pictures stock company in 1938 (as did Richard Fiske, who had to change his screen name from "Robert Fiske" as a result). Robert Fiske was frequently cast in Columbia's features, westerns, and serials, although he did accept assignments from other studios (notably as one of the suspects in Dick Tracy vs. Crime, Inc.). Today's audiences may know him as one of the villain's henchmen in the 1943 serial Batman.

Fiske died in Sunland, California of congestive heart failure at the age of 54, and was buried at Forest Lawn Memorial Park (Glendale).

== Selected filmography ==
- The Sky Parade (1936) - Scotty Allen
- Grand Jury (1936) - District Attorney (uncredited)
- Missing Girls (1936) - Ralph Gilmartin
- Alibi for Murder (1936) - Aviator (uncredited)
- Adventure in Manhattan (1936) - Dario - Henchman (uncredited)
- The Cowboy Star (1936) - Movie Director Martin (uncredited)
- Song of the Gringo (1936) - Defense Attorney
- Battle of Greed (1937) - Lawyer Hammond
- The Devil Diamond (1937) - 'Professor' John Henry Morgan, alias Moreland
- The Devil's Playground (1937) - Officer (uncredited)
- Old Louisiana (1937) - Luke E. Gilmore
- Criminals of the Air (1937) - Groom (uncredited)
- The Law Commands (1937) - John Abbott
- Drums of Destiny (1937) - Bill Holston
- Raw Timber (1937) - Bart Williams
- Roaring Six Guns (1937) - Jake Harmon - Banker
- Luck of Roaring Camp (1937) - Sheriff (uncredited)
- Hawaiian Buckaroo (1938) - J.J. Gillespie (uncredited)
- The Purple Vigilantes (1938) - George Drake
- Born to Be Wild (1938) - Man (uncredited)
- Cassidy of Bar 20 (1938) - Clay Allison
- Test Pilot (1938) - Attendant (uncredited)
- Flight into Nowhere (1938) - Dr. Butler
- Numbered Woman (1938) - Bob Wetherby
- The Great Adventures of Wild Bill Hickok (1938, Serial) - Morrell - Phantom Raider Chief
- Religious Racketeers (1938) - The Great LaGagge a.k.a. Louis LaGagge a.k.a. The Great Garno
- South of Arizona (1938) - Mark Kenyon
- Sunset Trail (1938) - Monte Keller
- The Colorado Trail (1938) - Deacon Webster
- West of the Santa Fe (1938) - Banker Frank Parker
- Crime Takes a Holiday (1938) - Automobile Salesman (uncredited)
- The Lady Objects (1938) - Mr. Horn (uncredited)
- Adventure in Sahara (1938) - Lt. Dumond
- I Am a Criminal (1938) - Attorney Phil Collins
- Smashing the Spy Ring (1938) - Lieutenant General (uncredited)
- The Thundering West (1939) - Harper (uncredited)
- Society Lawyer (1939) - Lefty - Crelliman's Henchman (uncredited)
- They Made Her a Spy (1939) - Davis (uncredited)
- Racketeers of the Range (1939) - Roger Whitlock
- Timber Stampede (1939) - Matt Chaflin
- The Man from Sundown (1939) - Captain Prescott
- Overland with Kit Carson (1939, Serial) - Henry Clay (Ch. 1) (uncredited)
- Sued for Libel (1939) - Radio Actor (uncredited)
- Buried Alive (1939) - Prosecuting Attorney Gerald Storm (uncredited)
- The Shadow (1940, Serial) - Stanford Marshall
- East Side Kids (1940) - Cornwall - a.k.a. Robert Morrison
- Passport to Alcatraz (1940) - Stanford Marshall
- Carolina Moon (1940) - Barrett
- Deadwood Dick (1940, Serial) - Ashton - Committeeman [Chs.1-6]
- Colorado (1940) - Mr. Carter (uncredited)
- Before I Hang (1940) - District Attorney
- The Green Archer (1940, Serial) - Savini
- Texas Terrors (1940) - Barker - Defense Attorney
- Law and Order (1940) - Ed Deal
- Along the Rio Grande (1941) - Doc Randall
- The Big Boss (1941) - George Fellows
- The Apache Kid (1941) - Joe Walker
- International Lady (1941) - Headwaiter (uncredited)
- Borrowed Hero (1941) - Grover Duncan (uncredited)
- Dick Tracy vs. Crime, Inc. (1941, Serial) - Walter Cabot
- Today I Hang (1942) - Det. Johnson
- A Tragedy at Midnight (1942) - Ricci's Doctor (uncredited)
- Black Dragons (1942) - Phillip Wallace
- Riders of the Northland (1942) - Mr. Strong (uncredited)
- Vengeance of the West (1942) - Gil Kirby
- The Secret Code (1942, Serial) - Investigator Ryan
- Gentleman Jim (1942) - Telegrapher (uncredited)
- The Valley of Vanishing Men (1942, Serial) - Harvey Cole (uncredited)
- Dead Man's Gulch (1943) - James Westfall (uncredited)
- Batman (1943, Serial) - Foster [Ch. 1-4] (uncredited)
- The Texas Kid (1943) - Naylor
- The Last Horseman (1944) - Barkley (uncredited)
- Cyclone Prairie Rangers (1944) - Emil 'Sierra' Weber a.k.a. Ed Wayne (uncredited) (final film role)
