= Rebellion (1936 film) =

1936 American western film

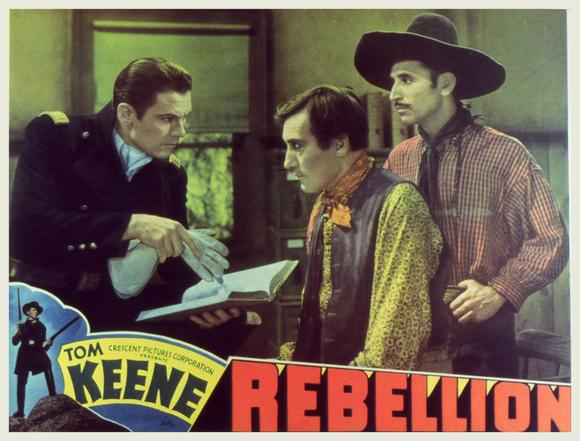
- Lobby card
- Directed by: Lynn Shores
- Story by: John T. Neville
- Produced by: E.B. Derr
- Starring: Tom Keene; Rita Hayworth; Duncan Renaldo
- Cinematography: Arthur Martinelli
- Music by: Abe Meyer
- Distributed by: Crescent Pictures Corporation
- Release date: October 27, 1936 (U.S.)
- Running time: 62 minutes
- Country: United States
- Language: English

Rebellion is a 1936 American Western film directed by Lynn Shores and starring Tom Keene, Rita Hayworth, and Duncan Renaldo.

== Cast ==
- Tom Keene as Captain John Carroll
- Rita Hayworth as Paula Castillo (credited as Rita Cansino)
- Duncan Renaldo as Ricardo Castillo
- William Royle as Harris
- Gino Corrado as Pablo
- Roger Gray as Honeycutt
- Bob McKenzie as Judge Moore
- Allan Cavan as President Zachary Taylor (credited as Allen Cavan)
- Jack Ingram as Henchman Hank
- Lita Cortez as Marquita
- Theodore Lorch as General Vallejo (credited as Theodore Lorsch)
- Merrill McCormick as Dr. Semple (credited as W. M. McCormick)
- Ralph Bucko as Henchman (uncredited)
- Allen Greer as Castillo Rider (uncredited)
- Al Haskell as Gang Member (uncredited)
- George Regas as Gang Member (uncredited)
