= Carlos De Valdez =

Peruvian-American actor

- Born: 19 March 1894; Arica, Peru
- Died: 30 October 1939 (aged 45); Encino, California; United States
- Occupation: Actor
- Years active: 1934 - 1940 (film)

Carlos De Valdez (19 March 1894 – 30 October 1939) was a Peruvian-American film actor who appeared in around forty American films.

De Valdez died in the Encino neighborhood of Los Angeles at the age of 45.

== Partial filmography ==
- Paris Interlude (1934)
- The Prescott Kid (1934)
- The Florentine Dagger (1935)
- Bonnie Scotland (1935)
- Robin Hood of El Dorado (1936)
- The Bold Caballero (1936)
- Men in Exile (1937)
- Old Louisiana (1937)
- Drums of Destiny (1937)
- The Last Train from Madrid (1937)
- Lancer Spy (1937)
- Conquest (1937)
- Romance in the Dark (1938)
- Blockade (1938)
- Suez (1938)
- The Llano Kid (1939)

== Bibliography ==
- Pitts, Michael R. Western Movies: A Guide to 5,105 Feature Films. McFarland, 2012.
