= Ray Jones (actor) =

American film and television actor

- Jones in 1940
- Born: Dewey Roy Jones; November 11, 1898; Panola County, Texas, U.S.
- Died: October 27, 1975 (aged 76); Los Angeles, California, U.S.
- Occupations: Film and television actor
- Spouse: Irene Cole (m. 1933)

Dewey Roy Jones (November 11, 1898 – October 27, 1975) was an American film and television actor. He was known for playing Renegade in the 1937 film Drums of Destiny.

== Life and career ==
Jones was born in Panola County, Texas. He began his screen career in 1928, appearing in the short film His Unlucky Night. In the same year, he appeared in the short films The Chicken, His Campus Carmen, Motorboat Mamas, The Bargain Hunt and The Burglar. In 1932, he appeared in the film Cornered.

Later in his career, Jones made his television debut in the syndicated anthology television series Your Favorite Story. He guest-starred in numerous television programs including Gunsmoke, Bonanza, Wagon Train, The Life and Legend of Wyatt Earp, Tombstone Territory, Have Gun – Will Travel, Tales of Wells Fargo, Bat Masterson and The Californians. He played Renegade in the 1937 film Drums of Destiny, starring along Tom Keene, Edna Lawrence and Budd Buster, and appeared in numerous films such as Cattle Stampede, Showdown at Boot Hill, Toughest Gun in Tombstone, North from the Lone Star, The Son of Davy Crockett, Top Gun, The Return of Jack Slade, Law of the Panhandle, The Brass Legend, The Vanishing Outpost, Fort Osage, The Fastest Gun Alive and A Lady Takes a Chance.

Jones retired from acting in 1963, last appearing in the syndicated western television series Death Valley Days.

== Death ==
Jones died on October 27, 1975, at the Broadway Community Hospital in Los Angeles, California, at the age of 76. He was buried at Rosedale Cemetery.
