= Female Fugitive (1938 film) =

1938 film

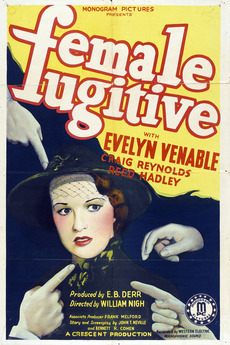
- Poster for the film
- Directed by: William Nigh
- Screenplay by: John T. Melville
- Story by: Bennett R. Cohen
- Produced by: E. B. Derr
- Starring: Evelyn Venable; Craig Reynolds; Reed Hadley
- Cinematography: Arthur Martinelli
- Edited by: Finn Ulback
- Music by: Abe Meyer
- Production company: Crescent Pictures
- Distributed by: Monogram Pictures
- Release date: April 15, 1938 (US)
- Running time: 58 minutes
- Country: United States
- Language: English

Female Fugitive is a 1938 American drama film, directed by William Nigh. The film stars Evelyn Venable, Craig Reynolds, and Reed Hadley. It was released on April 15, 1938.

== Plot ==
Peggy Mallory discovers that her husband, Jim, is part of a gang of truck hijackers, when she unknowingly drives the car which helps him and his gang escape. Disgusted, she leaves Jim, and finds work as the cook for artist Bruce Dunning. Initially she does not tell him the truth about herself, and the two fall in love. Eventually, she feels she cannot keep the secret from him and tells him all that has happened to her, after which he promises to protect her.

Meanwhile, her husband, who is still in love with her, has tracked her down after seeing a picture of her which was painted by Dunning. He arrives at Dunning's place to retrieve her, and in the confrontation it is made clear that Peggy was not an accomplice. Roberts, a G-man who has also been tracking Peggy, has overheard the exchange. There is a gun battle in which Roberts kills Jim. With her name cleared, Peggy is now free to marry Bruce.

== Cast ==
- Evelyn Venable as Peggy Mallory/Ann Williams
- Craig Reynolds as Jim Mallory
- Reed Hadley as Bruce Dunning
- John Kelly as Red
- Charlotte Treadway as Mrs. Bannister
- John Merton as Mort
- Ray Bennett as Burke
- Reginald Sheffield as Doctor
- Emmett Vogan as Leonard
- Martha Tibbetts as Claire Bannister
- Lee Phelps as Roberts

== Reception ==
The Daily News gave the film a lukewarm review, finding it disappointing, although they did compliment the work of Evelyn Venable. Harrison's Reports likewise gave the film a mediocre review, calling it "acceptable", but again praised the performance of Venable.
