= Circus Shadows =

1935 film

- Directed by: Charles Hutchison
- Written by: Sherman L. Lowe; C.C. Cheddon
- Produced by: Sam Efrus
- Starring: Dorothy Wilson; Kane Richmond; William Ruhl
- Cinematography: J. Henry Kruse
- Edited by: Fred Bain
- Music by: Lee Zahler
- Production company: Peerless Pictures
- Distributed by: Peerless Pictures
- Release date: May 3, 1935
- Running time: 66 minutes
- Country: United States
- Language: English

Circus Shadows is a 1935 American crime drama film directed by Charles Hutchison and starring Dorothy Wilson, Kane Richmond and William Ruhl. It was produced by the independent company Peerless Pictures. It was distributed by Universal Pictures in the United Kingdom.

== Cast ==
- Dorothy Wilson as Elaine Cavanaugh
- Kane Richmond as Dale Wentworth
- William Ruhl as Dave Zirillo
- Russell Hopton as A Dip
- Dorothy Revier
- Sam Ash
- Sumner Getchell as Dale's Friend
- Gladys Gale
- Ann Hovey
- Tove Linden
- John Ince
- Roy Rice
- Stan Scharling
- George Lloyd
- Marjorie O'Connell

== Bibliography ==
- Fetrow, Alan G. . Sound films, 1927-1939: a United States Filmography. McFarland, 1992.
- Pitts, Michael R. Poverty Row Studios, 1929–1940: An Illustrated History of 55 Independent Film Companies, with a Filmography for Each. McFarland & Company, 2005.
