= The Law Commands =

1937 film

- Directed by: William Nigh
- Written by: Bennett Cohen (story and screenplay)
- Produced by: E.B. Derr (producer); Bernard A. Moriarty (associate producer)
- Starring: Tom Keene; Robert Fiske; Budd Buster
- Cinematography: Arthur Martinelli
- Edited by: Donald Barratt
- Music by: Abe Meyer
- Production company: Crescent Pictures
- Distributed by: Crescent Pictures
- Release date: May 7, 1937
- Running time: 58 minutes
- Country: United States
- Language: English

The Law Commands is a 1937 American Western film directed by William Nigh and starring Tom Keene, Lorraine Randall, Robert Fiske and Budd Buster. It was produced by the Poverty Row company Crescent Pictures.

== Cast ==
- Tom Keene as Dr. Keith Kenton
- Lorraine Randall as Mary Lee Johnson
- Robert Fiske as John Abbott
- Budd Buster as Kentuck' Jones
- Matthew Betz as Frago, lead henchman
- John Merton as Frank Clark
- Carl Stockdale as Jed Johnson
- Marie Stoddard as Min Jones
- Charlotte Treadway as Martha Abbott
- David Sharpe as Danny Johnson
- Allan Cavan as Judge
- Horace B. Carpenter as Jason, lead farmer

== Bibliography ==
- Pitts, Michael R. Western Movies: A Guide to 5,105 Feature Films. McFarland, 2012.
