= Secret Evidence =

1941 film directed by William Nigh

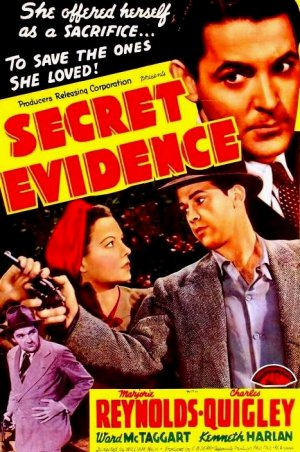
- Poster for the film
- Directed by: William Nigh
- Screenplay by: Brenda Cline
- Story by: Edward Bennett
- Produced by: E. B. Derr
- Starring: Marjorie Reynolds; Charles Quigley; Kenneth Harlan
- Cinematography: Arthur Martinelli
- Edited by: Helene Turner
- Music by: Edward J. Kay
- Production company: Producers Releasing Corporation
- Distributed by: Producers Releasing Corporation
- Release date: January 31, 1941
- Running time: 65 minutes
- Country: United States
- Language: English

Secret Evidence is a 1941 American drama film directed by William Nigh and starring Marjorie Reynolds, Charles Quigley, and Kenneth Harlan. Made and distributed as a second feature by Producers Releasing Corporation, the film was released on January 31, 1941.

== Cast ==
- Marjorie Reynolds as Linda Wilson
- Charles Quigley as David Harrison
- Ward McTaggart as Tony Baxter
- Howard Masters as Jerry Wilson
- Bob White as Sniffy
- Kenneth Harlan as Frank Billings
- Donald Curtis as Murphy
- Charles Phipps as Father
- Dorothy Vaughan as Mother
- Budd Buster as Frank

== Bibliography ==
- Fetrow, Alan G. Feature Films, 1940-1949: a United States Filmography. McFarland, 1994.
