= Ann Hovey =

American actress (1911–2007)

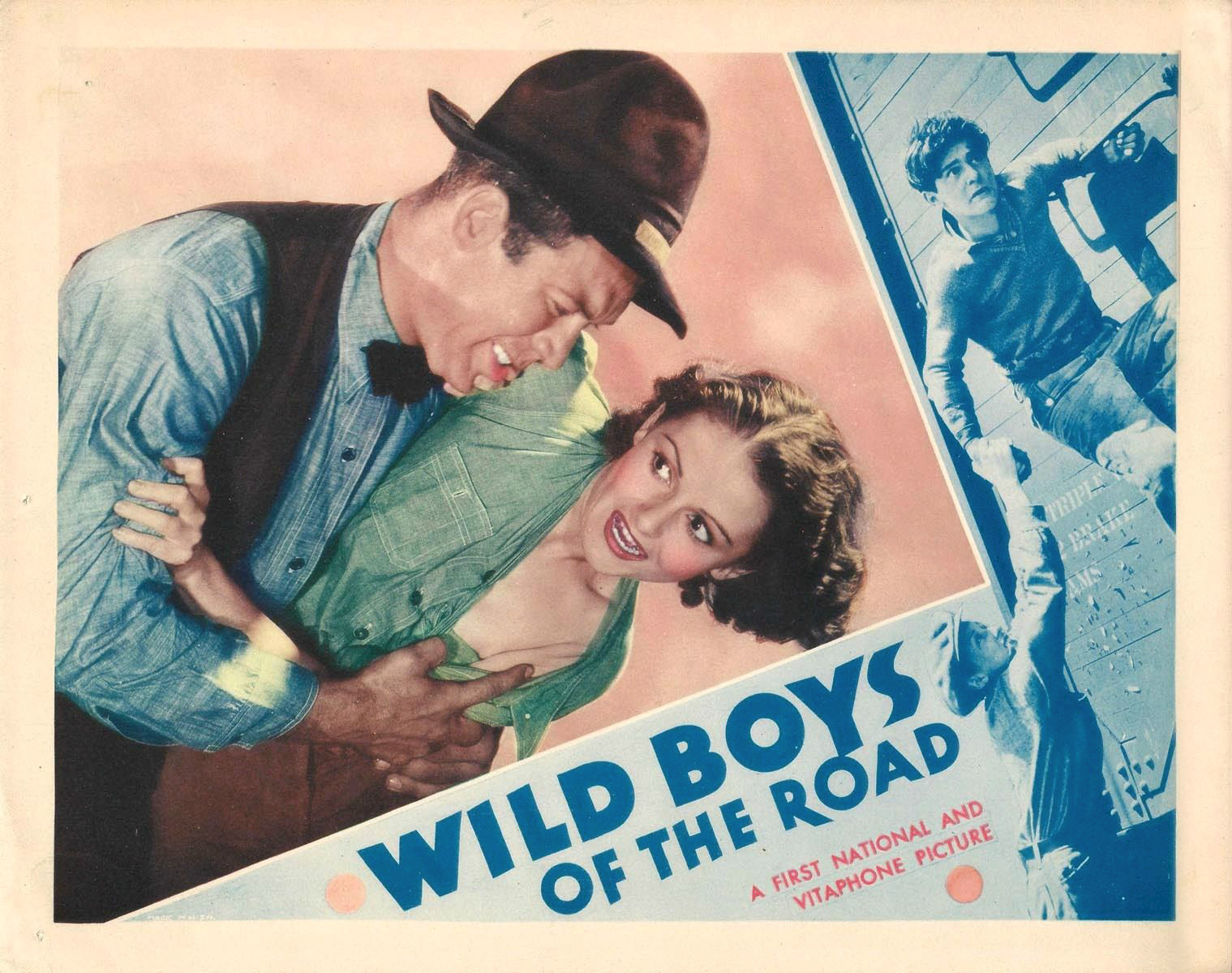
- Lobby card from Wild Boys of the Road (1933)
- Born: Ann Jacques Hovey; August 29, 1911; Mount Vernon, Indiana
- Died: August 25, 2007 (aged 95); Arizona
- Occupation: Film actress
- Years active: 1933–1938
- Spouse(s): William Crowell (1938-19??; divorced); Robert Husey (?-?) (his death)

Ann Hovey (August 29, 1911 – August 25, 2007) was an American chorus girl and film actress of the 1930s, primarily in B-movies.

"Hovey was involved in a car accident that caused a temporary loss of sight in her left eye. She attended Indiana High School, and after graduation worked as a chorus girl. In 1933, she began appearing in films as an uncredited chorus girl, like in 42nd Street and Private Detective 62. In 1938, she had a minor role in Flirting with Fate, which was her last. That year she married William Crowell of Crowell Publishing, and retired from acting. She died on August 25, 2007 in Arizona at age 95"

== Life and career ==
Born Ann Jacques Hovey in Mount Vernon, Indiana, Hovey was born into a wealthy and prominent family. A descendant of Alvin Peterson Hovey, a Union Army officer during the Civil War and the governor of Indiana from 1888 to 1891, Hovey's mother had been a part of the San Francisco high society scene until marrying Hovey's father, a prominent banker.

On a minor contract with Warner Bros., Hovey began appearing in films in 1933, her first being as an uncredited chorus girl in 42nd Street with Ginger Rogers and Warner Baxter, which would be Ginger Rogers' breakthrough movie. Hovey's first credited role was in the 1933 film Private Detective, starring William Powell. She appeared in six films that year, two of which were credited. In 1934 she appeared in three films, one of which was credited, but was selected as one of thirteen girls to be "WAMPAS Baby Stars", the last year that "WAMPAS" made those selections.

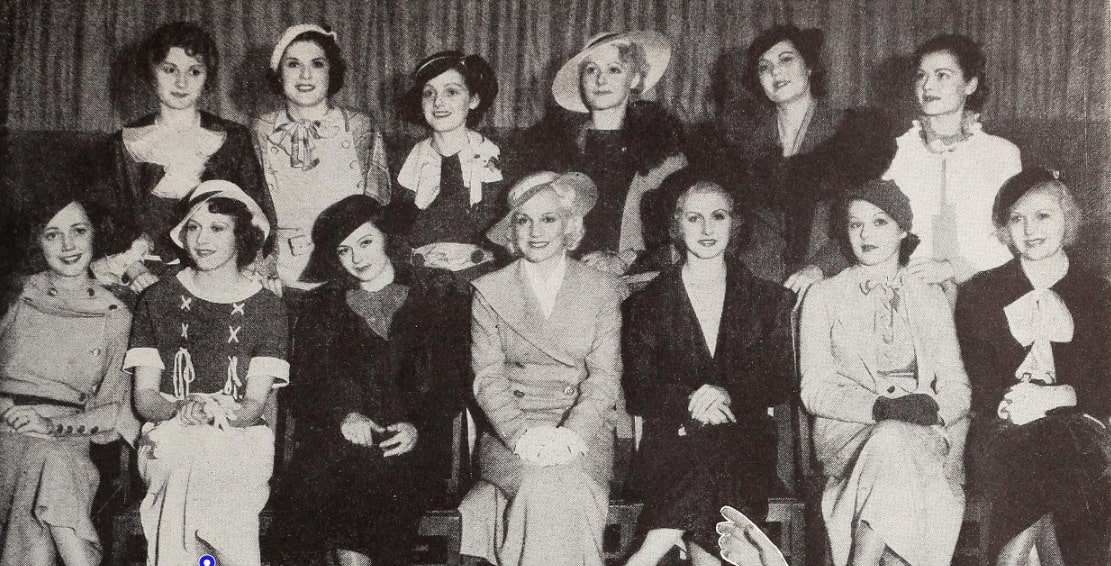
WAMPAS Baby Stars 1934 with Hovey back row third from left

In 1935, Hovey appeared in only one film, Circus Shadows, but was still receiving attention due to her "WAMPAS Baby Star" title. Dark haired and pretty, Hovey eventually caught the attention of studios after appearing in several films as a chorus girl and in minor acting roles, and in 1936 she signed a contract with RKO. That year she appeared in only one film, but it would be her most memorable, placing her in a supporting role to cowboy film star Tom Keene and Joan Barclay in the western The Glory Trail.

She would have roles in five films in 1937, three of which were credited; then, in 1938 she would have a minor role in Flirting with Fate, which would be her last. That year she married William Crowell of the Crowell Publishing Company, and retired from acting.

== Later years and death ==
She and Crowell later divorced, and she married Robert Husey, a press agent, to whom she would remain married until his death. During the mid-1990s, when informed that she was being sought after by fans of her films, Hovey commented, "I'm surprised. I never thought I was any good." She and Husey had moved to Arizona, where she was residing at the time of her death, only four days shy of her 96th birthday, on August 25, 2007.

== Partial filmography ==
- 42nd Street (1933) (uncredited)
- Gold Diggers of 1933 (1933) (uncredited)
- Wild Boys of the Road (1933)
- Easy to Love (1934) (uncredited)
- Kiss and Make-Up (1934)
- Young and Beautiful (1934)
- Circus Shadows (1935)
- The Glory Trail (1936)
- Annapolis Salute (1937)
- Danger Patrol (1937)
- Flirting with Fate (1938)

== Sources ==
- Liebman, Roy (2000). The Wampas Baby Stars: A Biographical Dictionary, 1922–1934. Jefferson, North Carolina: McFarland. ISBN 0-7864-0756-5.
