= Arthur Martinelli =

American cinematographer (1881–1967)

- Born: April 29, 1881; Italy
- Died: September 7, 1967 (aged 86); Hollywood, California, United States
- Occupation: Cinematographer
- Years active: 1916—48

Arthur Martinelli (April 29, 1881 — September 7, 1967) was an American cinematographer whose career spanned from the silent era through the golden age of American movies. During that time he shot over 100 films. A pioneer in the industry, he was the cinematographer to film the first movie to star Ethel and John Barrymore.

== Career ==
Martinelli was thought to be one of the first film cameramen in the United States. In 1915 he was employed by International Pictures, and he moved to Metro Pictures Corp., the forerunner of Metro-Goldwyn-Mayer in 1916. In the 1910s some of his notable films include: The White Raven, starring Ethel Barrymore (1917); 1918's Kildare of Storm, starring Broadway actress Emily Stevens; the Emmy Wehlen vehicle, A Favor to a Friend (1919); and Henry Otto's 1919 comedy, Fair and Warmer. In 1921 he was asked for his opinion about the role of a director in films:

A capable director is a most vital necessity to the motion picture cameraman and the star. There have been many instances where a cameraman has worked hard and obtained good photography, but due to poor direction, the picture was a failure.

In the remaining years of the silent era, some of the more notable films which Martinelli shot include: Polly With a Past (1920), starring Ina Claire who was reprising her stage role; Alias Ladyfingers (1921), directed by Bayard Veiller; Ella Cinders (1926), based on the popular comic strip and starring Colleen Moore; and 1926's The Greater Glory, starring Conway Tearle and Boris Karloff.

After the advent of sound film, Martinelli would be the director of photography on what is considered the first feature length zombie film, White Zombie (1932), starring Bela Lugosi. During the Hollywood's Golden Age, Martinelli would film over 50 pictures, including: Supernatural (1933), starring Carole Lombard and Randolph Scott; Revolt of the Zombies, the 1936 sequel to White Zombie, starring Dorothy Stone and Dean Jagger; the 1937 western, Drums of Destiny, starring Tom Keene; the 1939 crime drama Star Reporter; the 1940 Bela Lugosi horror film, The Devil Bat; the film noir Federal Fugitives (1941); the 1941 drama, Double Cross; the final installment in the Scattergood Baines film series, Cinderella Swings It (1943); the 1944 Charlie Chan film Black Magic; and the 1945 western, In Old New Mexico, based on O. Henry's 1909 character, The Cisco Kid.

His final film was 1948's The Story of Life, a notorious sex hygiene exploitation film, done in 1948.

== Filmography ==
(Per AFI database)

- The Purple Lady (1916)
- The End of the Tour (1917)
- The Greatest Power (1917)
- The Trail of the Shadow (1917)
- The White Raven (1917)
- Alias Mrs. Jessop (1917)
- Her Fighting Chance (1917)
- A Successful Adventure (1918)
- Sylvia on a Spree (1918)
- The Winning of Beatrice (1918)
- Kildare of Storm (1918)
- Pay Day (1918)
- A Favor to a Friend (1919)
- Johnny-on-the-Spot (1919)
- The Amateur Adventuress (1919)
- Fools and Their Money (1919)
- Fair and Warmer (1919)
- That's Good (1919)
- Love, Honor and Obey (1920)
- The Misleading Lady (1920)
- Polly With a Past (1920)
- The Walk-Offs (1920)
- Alias Ladyfingers (1921)
- The Idle Rich (1921)
- The Man Who (1921)
- A Message From Mars (1921)
- A Trip to Paradise (1921)
- The Face Between (1922)
- The Right That Failed (1922)
- Sherlock Brown (1922)
- Youth to Youth (1922)
- East Side - West Side (1923)
- The Meanest Man in the World (1923)
- Ella Cinders (1926)
- The Greater Glory (1926)
- Mariett Dances Today (1928)
- Mary Lou (1928)
- Sombras de gloria (1930)
- White Zombie (1932)
- Supernatural (1933)
- Las fronteras del amor (1934)
- Girl in the Case (1934)
- No matarás (1935)
- $20 a Week (1935)
- Rebellion (1936)
- The Glory Trail (1936)
- Just My Luck (1936)
- Revolt of the Zombies (1936)
- I Conquer the Sea! (1936)
- Drums of Destiny (1937)
- Old Louisiana (1937)
- Nation Aflame (1937)
- County Fair (1937)
- The Law Commands (1937)
- Mile-a-Minute-Love (1937)
- Raw Timber (1937)
- Trailin' Trouble (1937)
- Under Strange Flags (1937)
- Mis dos amores (1938)
- Castillos en el aire (1938)
- Female Fugitive (1938)
- Gang Bullets (1938)
- Ten Laps to Go (1938)
- Shadows Over Shanghai (1938)
- My Old Kentucky Home (1938)
- Numbered Woman (1938)
- Cipher Bureau (1938)
- Verbena trágica (1939)
- La Inmaculada (1939)
- Long Shot (1939)
- Panama Patrol (1939)
- Star Reporter (1939)
- Undercover Agent (1939)
- The Covered Trailer (1939)
- The Witness Vanishes (1939)
- Inside Information (1939)
- The Mad Empress (1939)
- Convict's Code (1939)
- Tengo fe en ti (1940)
- Devil Bat (1940)
- The Deadly Game (1941)
- Double Trouble (1941)
- Federal Fugitives (1941)
- Mr. Celebrity (1941)
- Paper Bullets (1941)
- Secret Evidence (1941)
- Criminals Within (1941)
- Double Cross (1941)
- The Miracle Kid (1941)
- The Power of God (1942)
- Inside the Law (1942)
- Professor Creeps (1942)
- Cinderella Swings It (1943)
- Deerslayer (1943)
- Here Comes Kelly (1943)
- Swing Out the Blues (1944)
- Call of the Jungle (1944)
- West of the Rio Grande (1944)
- Black Magic (1944)
- In Old New Mexico (1945)
- Youth for the Kingdom (1945)
- The Story of Life (1948)

== Personal life and death ==
Martinelli was the uncle of Emmy-nominated cinematographer Enzo Martinelli, who he became guardian of after the death of Enzo's parents when the boy was 12. Martinelli allowed Enzo to use his darkroom and camera equipment, which nurtured the younger Martinelli's interest in camera work.

Martinelli died on September 7, 1967, at Braewood Sanitarium in South Pasadena, California.
