= Big Money (film) =

1930 film

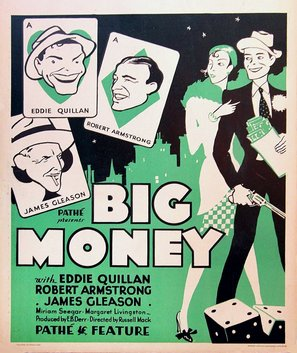
- Directed by: Russell Mack
- Written by: Walter DeLeon; Russell Mack
- Produced by: E.B. Derr
- Starring: Eddie Quillan; Robert Armstrong; James Gleason
- Cinematography: John J. Mescall
- Edited by: Joseph Kane
- Music by: Josiah Zuro
- Production company: Pathé Exchange
- Distributed by: Pathé Exchange
- Release date: October 28, 1930
- Running time: 80 minutes
- Country: United States
- Language: English

Big Money is a 1930 American pre-Code comedy-drama film directed by Russell Mack and starring Eddie Quillan, Robert Armstrong, and James Gleason. It was produced and distributed by Pathé Exchange, shortly before the company was completely absorbed by RKO.

The film's sets were designed by the art director Carroll Clark.

== Plot ==
A message boy from a brokerage house ends up having to take care of $50,000 overnight.

== Cast ==
- Eddie Quillan as Eddie
- Robert Armstrong as Ace
- James Gleason as Tom
- Margaret Livingston as Mae
- Miriam Seegar as Joan McCall
- Robert Edeson as Mr. McCall
- Dorothy Christy as Leila
- G. Pat Collins as Smiley
- Morgan Wallace as Durkin
- Myrtis Crinley as Flora
- Robert Gleckler as Monk
- Charles Sellon as Bradley
- Kit Guard as Lefty
- Johnnie Morris as Weejee
- Frank Sabini as Waiter
- Clara Palmer as Society Woman
- Spec O'Donnell as Elevator Boy
- Mona Rico as Maid
- Murray Smith as Izzy
- Jack McDonald as Butler
- Zita Moulton as Michael
- Jack Hanlon as Office Boy
- Richard Cramer as Detroit Dan
- Maurice Black as Lewis Wilder
- Edgar Dearing as Detective
- Harry Semels as Waiter
- Harry Tyler as Wendell

== Bibliography ==
- Munden, Kenneth White. The American Film Institute Catalog of Motion Pictures Produced in the United States, Part 1. University of California Press, 1997.
