= Vengeance of the West =

1942 film by Lambert Hillyer

- Theatrical release poster
- Directed by: Lambert Hillyer
- Screenplay by: Luci Ward
- Story by: Jack Townley
- Produced by: Leon Barsha
- Starring: Wild Bill Elliott; Tex Ritter; Frank Mitchell; Adele Mara; Dick Curtis; Robert Fiske
- Cinematography: George Meehan
- Edited by: Burton Kramer
- Production company: Columbia Pictures
- Distributed by: Columbia Pictures
- Release date: August 16, 1942
- Running time: 61 minutes
- Country: United States
- Language: English

Vengeance of the West is a 1942 American Western film directed by Lambert Hillyer and written by Luci Ward. The film stars Wild Bill Elliott, Tex Ritter, Frank Mitchell, Adele Mara, Dick Curtis and Robert Fiske. The film was released on August 16, 1942, by Columbia Pictures.

== Cast ==
- Wild Bill Elliott as Joaquin Murietta / The Black Shadow
- Tex Ritter as Captain Tex Lake
- Frank Mitchell as Cannonball Boggs
- Adele Mara as Anita Morell
- Dick Curtis as Jeff Gorman
- Robert Fiske as Gil Kirby
- Ted Mapes as Mason
- Eva Puig as Maria
- José Luis Tortosa as Florencio
- Guy Wilkerson as Long John
