= Morgan Wallace =

American actor (1881–1953)

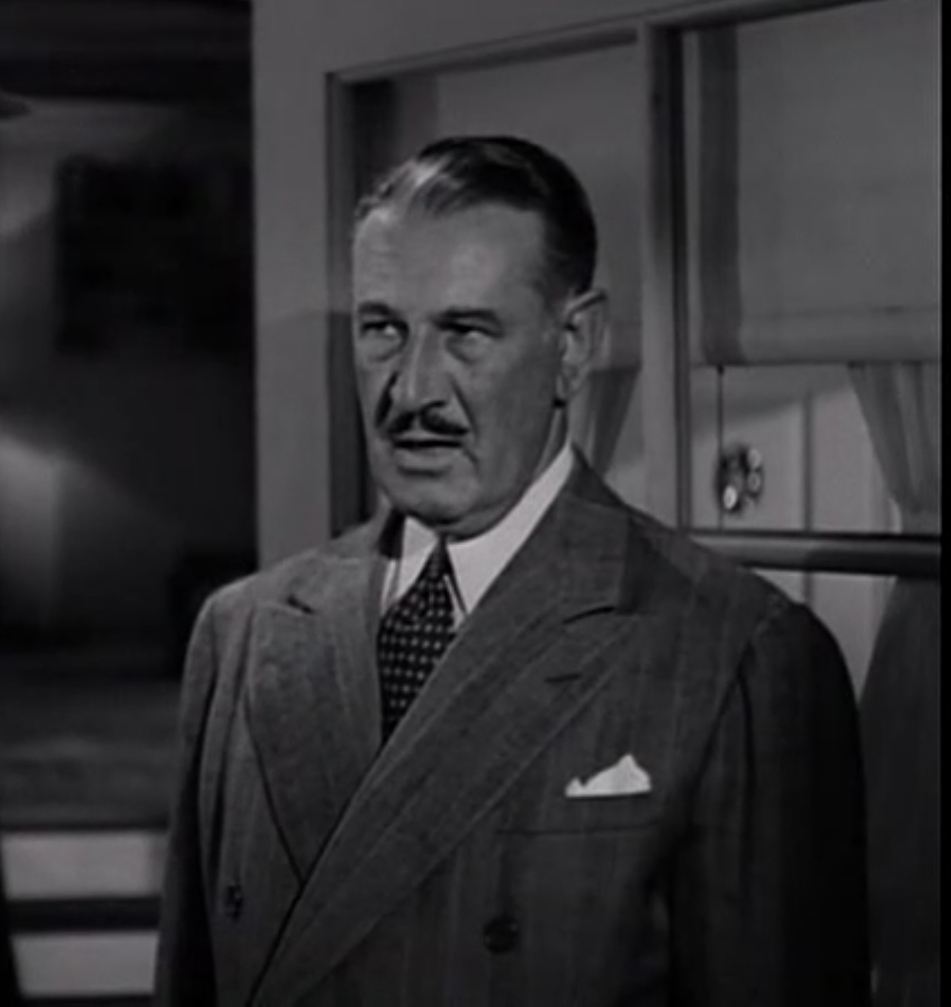
- Wallace in Dick Tracy (1945)
- Born: Maier Weill; July 28, 1881; Lompoc, California, U.S.
- Died: December 12, 1953 (aged 72); Tarzana, California, U.S.
- Resting place: Forest Lawn Memorial Park, Glendale, California
- Occupation: Actor
- Years active: 1914–1946
- Spouse(s): Louise Chapman (m. 19??)

Morgan Wallace (born Maier Weill, July 28, 1881 – December 12, 1953) was an American actor. He appeared in more than 120 films between 1914 and 1946. He is perhaps best known to today's audiences for two W.C. Fields comedies. In It's a Gift (1934) he persistently asks grocer Fields for "Kumquats!" In My Little Chickadee (1940), he is a suspicious gambler who challenges Fields in a poker game. Wallace is also known for his performance as the sinister, international menace in Charlie Chan at the Olympics (1936).

== Early life ==
Born in Lompoc, California, Wallace was the son of Isidore and Hannah Weill. His father was a Jewish immigrant from France, and his mother was born in California. He attended the University of California.

== Stage ==
Wallace toured with a Shakespearean repertory company before organizing his own stock company, The Morgan Wallace Players, in Bangor, Maine, in 1903. During World War I he set up theaters in army camps.

In 1918, the Morgan Wallace Players performed in the Grand Theater in Sioux City, Iowa, and in 1927, the troupe performed in Harrisburg, Pennsylvania. In 1922, he acted in a production of Lawful Larceny at the Savoy Theatre in London, England.

Wallace's Broadway credits included Romeo and Juliet (1904), The Widow's Might (1909), The Tavern (1920), Nature's Nobleman (1921), The Law Breaker (1922), The Stork (1925), Gentle Grafters (1926), Ballyhoo (1927), Women Go On Forever (1927; Wallace also appeared in the 1931 film version), and Congratulations (1929).

== Film ==
Morgan Wallace claimed that his first film credit was D. W. Griffith's silent feature Dream Street (1921), but he had appeared in silent films as far back as 1914 (he's in a couple of Charlie Chaplin comedies filmed at Keystone). He "resigned from the Keystone" to return to the New York stage, before his career was interrupted by military service. He returned to films after the war, and left in 1924 to concentrate on stage work.

Wallace was one of the stage-trained actors signed by Hollywood studios for the new talking pictures; he began a second and much more successful movie career in 1930. He soon became a dependable all-purpose character player, equally adept at playing upstanding citizens, prosperous businessmen, and urbane villains.

In 1933 Wallace was one of the founders of the Screen Actors Guild. He was SAG member #3.

Unlike many character actors, Morgan Wallace was never under long-term contract to any single studio. His prominence in the actors' union may have discouraged studios from offering the influential Wallace steady employment. His ability as a character actor was undeniable, however, so Wallace kept working on a freelance basis for most of the Hollywood studios.

During World War II Wallace managed camp shows for the USO. Very late in his career he had a surprising and prominent character role in I'll Remember April (1945), as an industrialist who calmly announces that he has embezzled six million dollars; is murdered; and "returns from the dead" to unmask his own killer. His final film was The Falcon's Alibi (1946).

== Broadway encore ==
That same year Morgan Wallace returned to the Broadway stage for a featured role in the new comedy Loco (1946), starring screen actress Jean Parker. The play ran for exactly one month in the late fall of 1946. Wallace then retired at the age of 65, and returned to his home in California.

== Death ==
He died on December 12, 1953 at the age of 72 in Tarzana, California, and was interred in Forest Lawn Memorial Park, Glendale, California.

== Selected filmography ==
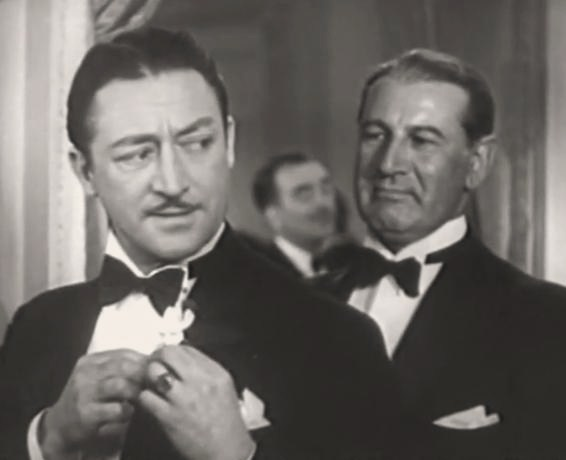
Theodore von Eltz (left) and Morgan Wallace in The Headline Woman (1935)

- Gentlemen of Nerve (1914) as Spectator (film debut)
- Tillie's Punctured Romance (1914) as Thief in 'A Thief's Fate' (uncredited)
- Bringing Up Betty (1919) as Duke of Medonia
- Flying Pat (1920) as William Endicott
- Dream Street (1921) as Masked Violinist
- Orphans of the Storm (1921) as Marquis de Praille
- One Exciting Night (1922) as J. Wilson Rockmaine
- The Hotel Mouse (1923; British film) as Honorable Harry Hurlingham
- The Fighting Blade (1923) as Lord Robert Erisey
- The Dangerous Maid (1923) as Col. Percy Kirk
- Torment (1924) as Jules Carstock
- Daring Love (1924) as Jerry Hayden
- A Woman Who Sinned (1924) as George Ransdell
- Sandra (1924) as François Molyneaux
- Reckless Romance (1924) as Harold Shrewsbury
- Sisters (1930) as William Tully
- Up the River (1930) as Frosby (uncredited)
- Big Money (1930) as Durkin
- It Pays to Advertise (1931) as L.R. McChesney
- The Maltese Falcon (1931) as District Attorney (uncredited)
- Smart Money (1931) as District Attorney Black (uncredited)
- Women Go on Forever (1931) as Jake
- Alexander Hamilton (1931) as James Monroe
- Expensive Women (1931) as Arthur Raymond's Pal (uncredited)
- The Unholy Garden (1931) as Capt. Kruger (uncredited)
- The Ruling Voice (1931) as Board Member (uncredited)
- Safe in Hell (1931) as Mr. Bruno, the Hangman
- Hell's House (1932) as Frank Gebhardt
- The Final Edition (1932) as Neil Selby
- The Beast of the City (1932) as Police Captain (uncredited)
- Steady Company (1932) as Tuxedo Carter
- The Wet Parade (1932) as Bootlegger Leader (uncredited)
- Grand Hotel (1932) as Chauffeur
- The Mouthpiece (1932) as E.A. Smith
- Fast Companions (1932) as Cueball Kelly
- Lady and Gent (1932) as Cash Enright
- Blonde Venus (1932) as Dr. Pierce
- Wild Girl (1932) as Phineas Baldwin
- If I Had a Million (1932) as Mike, Jackson's Gangster Friend (uncredited)
- Central Park (1932) as District Attorney (uncredited)
- Smoke Lightning (1933) as Sheriff Archie Kyle
- Terror Aboard (1933) as Morton Hazlitt
- Jennie Gerhardt (1933) as O'Brien (uncredited)
- Mama Loves Papa (1933) as Mr. McIntosh
- The Song of Songs (1933) as Admirer (uncredited)
- Golden Harvest (1933) as Trading Center Spokesman (uncredited)
- Bombshell (1933) as H.E. Gillette (uncredited)
- The Prizefighter and the Lady (1933) as Mr. Black, Fight Promoter (uncredited)
- Above the Clouds (1933) as Chandler
- Mr. Skitch (1933) as Jones (uncredited)
- The Meanest Gal in Town (1934) as Sydney Sterling (uncredited)
- David Harum (1934) as Mr. Blake (uncredited)
- Three on a Honeymoon (1934) as Dunning (uncredited)
- I Believed in You (1934) as Oliver Lang i.e. Long
- The Trumpet Blows (1934) as Police Inspector
- Sleepers East (1934) as Prosecuting Attorney (uncredited)
- Many Happy Returns (1934) as Nathan Silas
- The Merry Widow (1934) as Prosecuting Attorney (uncredited)
- We Live Again (1934) as The Colonel
- Cheating Cheaters (1934) as Holmes
- The Third Sex (1934) as Paul Van Dyne
- College Rhythm (1934) as Broker's Manager, First Tramp (uncredited)
- It's a Gift (1934) as Jasper Fitchmueller
- Murder on a Honeymoon (1935) as McArthur, a.k.a. Arthur Mack
- The Devil Is a Woman (1935) as Dr. Mendez (uncredited)
- Goin' to Town (1935) as J. Henry Brash (uncredited)
- The Headline Woman (1935) as Clarkey
- Dante's Inferno (1935) as Capt. Morgan
- Orchids to You (1935) as Attorney (uncredited)
- Thunder Mountain (1935) as Rand Leavitt
- Confidential (1935) as H. Van Cleve
- 1,000 Dollars a Minute (1935) as Big Jim Bradley
- Rendezvous (1935) as Gardner (uncredited)
- Mary Burns, Fugitive (1935) as Managing editor
- Dangerous Waters (1936) as Heegan (uncredited)
- Sutter's Gold (1936) as General Fremont
- Love on a Bet (1936) as Morton, Escaped Convict
- Robin Hood of El Dorado (1936) as Hacendado Wanting to Fight (uncredited)
- Human Cargo (1936) as Gilbert Fender
- Fury (1936) as Fred Garrett
- Mr. Cinderella (1936) as Mr. Emmett Fawcett
- House of Secrets (1936) as Dr. Kenmore
- Pennies from Heaven (1936) as Restaurant Partner (uncredited)
- Charlie Chan at the Olympics (1937) as Honorable Charles Zaraka
- The Californian (1937) as Tod Barsto
- Under Suspicion (1937) as Carey MacGregor
- The Lady in the Morgue (1938) as Layman
- Hold That Kiss (1938) as Mr. Wood, Tommy's Boss (uncredited)
- Numbered Woman (1938)
- Three Comrades (1938) as Owner of Wrecked Car (uncredited)
- Woman Against Woman (1938) as Morton
- Delinquent Parents (1938) as Charles Wharton, as an adult
- Letter of Introduction (1938) as Editor (uncredited)
- Billy the Kid Returns (1938) as J. B. Morganson
- Gang Bullets (1938) as 'Big Bill' Anderson
- Star Reporter (1939) as Joe Draper / Charles Benton
- The Mystery of Mr. Wong (1939) as Brendan Edwards
- Broadway Serenade (1939) as Mr. Park (uncredited)
- Union Pacific (1939) as Sen. Smith (uncredited)
- Timber Stampede (1939) as Dunlap
- Mr. Moto Takes a Vacation (1939) as David Perez
- The Star Maker (1939) as Lou Morris
- Parole Fixer (1940) as Ben
- My Little Chickadee (1940) as Gambler (uncredited)
- I Love You Again (1940) as Mr. Belenson
- Spring Parade (1940) as Frederick, Aide-de-Camp (uncredited)
- Three Men from Texas (1940) as Captain Andrews
- Ellery Queen, Master Detective (1940) as Zachary
- Blame It on Love (1940) as Mr. Wadsworth
- In Old Colorado (1941) as Sheriff Jack Collins
- Adventure in Washington (1941) as Senator Burrows (uncredited)
- Scattergood Meets Broadway (1941) as Reynolds
- Harmon of Michigan (1941) as Alumni Committee Man (uncredited)
- Honky Tonk (1941) as Mayor Adams (uncredited)
- Sea Raiders (1941, Serial) as Capt. Lester [Chs. 1-3, 6-7]
- Design for Scandal (1941) as Man Whose Head is Painted (uncredited)
- Gaslight (1944) as Fred Garrett (uncredited)
- Kismet (1944) as Merchant (uncredited)
- Song of the Sarong (1945) as Cyrus P. Adams
- I'll Remember April (1945) as Henry Childs
- Dick Tracy (1945) as Steve Owens
- The Falcon's Alibi (1946) as Bender (final film)
