= Federal Fugitives =

1941 film

- Original film poster
- Directed by: William Beaudine
- Written by: Martin Mooney (story & screenplay)
- Produced by: John T. Coyle
- Starring: Neil Hamilton; Doris Day (Note: Doris Day Renna born 1910 was distinguished from singer/actor Doris Day. As an actress, Day was known for Thou Shalt Not Kill (1939) and Village Barn Dance (1940). She died in 1998 at Huntington Beach, California.); Victor Varconi; Charles C. Wilson
- Cinematography: Arthur Martinelli
- Edited by: Robert O. Crandall
- Music by: Alberto Colombo
- Production company: Producers Releasing Corporation
- Distributed by: Producers Releasing Corporation
- Release date: March 29, 1941
- Running time: 66 minutes
- Country: United States
- Language: English

Federal Fugitives (a.k.a. International Spy) is a 1941 American film noir directed by William Beaudine. The film stars Neil Hamilton, Doris Day, Victor Varconi, and Charles C. Wilson.

== Plot ==
Government agent Captain James Madison (Neil Hamilton) spots a man in Washington D.C. that he thinks is Otto Lieberman (Victor Varconi), a fugitive that caused an aircraft crash that killed eight people. Without Lieberman's knowledge, Madison manages to identify him by his fingerprints on a water glass. He then learns his address after having his regular cab driver, Chuck (Lyle Latell), follow him. Lieberman has now assumed the identity of Dr. Frederic Haskell and is working with Bruce Lane (Charles C. Wilson), a wealthy lobbyist suspected of dealing with foreign agents.

The two men embark on a scheme to gain control of the aircraft plant owned by Henry Gregory (George M. Carleton). Gregory has invented a casting-process that uses plastic for some of the parts in an aircraft. Learning that Lieberman and Lane have met with Gregory, Madison also meets him and asks that he be introduced to them as Robert Edmunds, Gregory's partner in Los Angeles.

Lane's assistant Rita Bennett (Doris Day), is caught up in the scheme, but falls for the government agent. Rita is afraid that Edmunds is going to be poisoned, but before she can warn him, she is struck down by a speeding car. After days in the hospital, she tries to carry out the warning, but the government agent is now at Haskell's hideout and about to take a poison pill. With Chuck and his friend Ox (Frank Moran), Rita takes them to the hideout. They subdue the foreign agents while Madison pursues Haskell, who falls down an elevator shaft to his death. Finally, Rita and Madison embrace and kiss.

== Cast ==
- Neil Hamilton as Capt. James Madison/Robert Edmunds
- Doris Day as Rita Bennett
- Victor Varconi as Otto Lieberman a.k.a. Dr. Frederic Haskell
- Charles C. Wilson as Bruce Lane (as Charles Wilson)
- George M. Carleton as Henry Gregory
- Frank Shannon as Col. Hammond
- Betty Blythe as Marcia, Lane's sister
- Lyle Latell as Chuck
- Frank Moran as Ox, Chuck's Pal

== Production ==
Principal photography for Federal Fugitives under the working title of International Spy took place in two weeks from mid-February 1941. After a stint in Great Britain, director William "One Shot" Beaudine returned to America in 1937 but had trouble re-establishing himself at the major studios.

After working at Warner Brothers, Beaudine found work on Poverty Row, working for studios specializing in low-budget films, such as Monogram Pictures and Producers Releasing Corporation. Beaudine became a specialist in comedies, thrillers and melodramas making dozens for these studios. By the 1940s, Beaudine had a reputation for being a resourceful, no-nonsense director who could make feature films in a matter of days, sometimes as few as five.

Typical of the low-budget spy genre of the period that often linked together latest aviation technology, Federal Fugitives did not have the benefit of on-location or studio sound stage scenes to create an aviation milieu. The aircraft being depicted is the top-secret Bell P-39 Airacobra in a scale model form.

== Reception ==
Shortly after release, Federal Fugitives was followed up by Emergency Landing, another B film. Although only notable as one of a group of 1941 low-budget action films revolving around military aviation, the film was soon eclipsed by real-life events.
