= We're Only Human (film) =

1935 American film directed by James Flood

- Directed by: James Flood; Clem Beauchamp (assistant)
- Screenplay by: Rian James; Bartlett Cormack
- Based on: Husk; 1935 story in The Saturday Evening Post by Thomas Walsh
- Produced by: Edward Kaufman
- Starring: Preston Foster; Jane Wyatt; James Gleason
- Cinematography: J. Roy Hunt
- Edited by: Archie F. Marshek
- Music by: Roy Webb
- Production company: RKO Radio Pictures
- Distributed by: RKO Radio Pictures
- Release date: December 27, 1935
- Running time: 68 minutes
- Country: United States
- Language: English

We're Only Human is a 1935 American crime drama film directed by James Flood from a screenplay by Rian James. Starring Preston Foster, Jane Wyatt, and James Gleason, it was released by RKO Radio Pictures on December 27, 1935. The film is based on Husk, a 1935 story in The Saturday Evening Post, by Thomas Walsh.

== Plot ==
A police detective and his girlfriend try to catch an escaped gangster.

== Cast ==
- Preston Foster as Det. Sgt. Pete 'Mac' McCaffrey
- Jane Wyatt as Sally Rogers
- James Gleason as Detective Danny Walsh
- Arthur Hohl as Lawyer John Martin
- John Arledge as Johnny O'Brien
- Jane Darwell as Mrs. Walsh
- Moroni Olsen as Inspector J.R. Curran
- Christian Rub as William Anderson
- Mischa Auer as William 'Lefty'

== Critical response ==
Variety’s reviewer gave the film a mostly negative assessment, and wrote that the story is “very simple and elementary” and “just barely manages to maintain some suspense”. The performances of Preston Foster and Jane Wyatt were described as “hackneyed”, however “Christian Rub …. gives a swell performance …. while Rafaela Ottiano …. also impresses.”

The Film Daily described the film as "primarily a fast moving melodramatic yarn" that benefited from a romance between the Preston Foster and Jane Wyatt characters and good performances from the cast.
