= Eva Puig =

Mexican actress (1894–1968)

- Born: February 3, 1894; Coatzacoalcos, Veracruz, Mexico
- Died: October 6, 1968 (aged 74); Panorama City, California, United States
- Other name: Eva Ladero De Guevara Puig
- Occupation: Actress
- Years active: 1936 - 1946 (film)

Eva Puig (1894–1968) was a Mexican film actress.

== Partial filmography ==
- The Crime of Dr. Forbes (1936) - Mrs. Luigi (uncredited)
- Rancho Grande (1940) - Mama Fernandez (uncredited)
- Forty Little Mothers (1940) - Mama Lupini (uncredited)
- I Want a Divorce (1940) - Peppy's Mother (uncredited)
- North West Mounted Police (1940) - Ekawe
- The Texas Rangers Ride Again (1940) - Maria
- Romance of the Rio Grande (1940) - Marta
- Bowery Boy (1940) - Woman (uncredited)
- Ride on Vaquero (1941) - Maria (uncredited)
- Singapore Woman (1941) - Natasha
- Hold Back the Dawn (1941) - Lupita
- Mob Town (1941) - Mrs. Minch (uncredited)
- Below the Border (1942) - Aunt Maria
- Rio Rita (1942) - Marianna
- Vengeance of the West (1942) - Maria
- Undercover Man (1942) - Rosita Lopez
- The Lone Star Ranger (1942)
- Arabian Nights (1942) - Old Woman (uncredited)
- The Cisco Kid Returns (1945) - Señora
- A Medal for Benny (1945) - Mrs. Catalina (uncredited)
- A Bell for Adano (1945) - Woman (uncredited)
- Navajo Kid (1945) - 2nd Navajo Woman (uncredited)
- Snafu (1945) - Josephina
- Masquerade in Mexico (1945) - Bullfight Spectator (uncredited)
- San Antonio (1945) - Old Mexican Woman (uncredited)
- Two Sisters from Boston (1946) - Maria - Hairdresser (uncredited)
- Wild Beauty (1946) - Winnie (uncredited)
- Plainsman and the Lady (1946) - Anita Lopez (final film role)

== Bibliography ==
- Robert McLaughlin. We'll Always Have the Movies: American Cinema during World War II. University Press of Kentucky, 2006.
