= Mary Lawrence (actress) =

American actress (1918–1991)

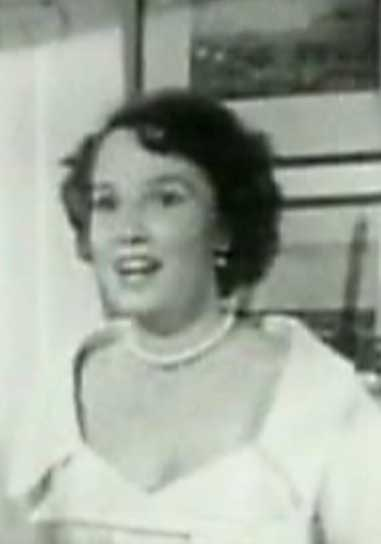
- Mary Lawrence (1952), in The Lady Says No
- Born: Mary Lou Lender; May 17, 1918; Newark, Ohio, U.S.
- Died: September 24, 1991 (aged 73); Santa Monica, California, U.S.
- Occupations: Actor, author
- Years active: 1937–1965
- Spouse(s): Delmer Daves (m. 1938; died 1977) Samuel Doak Young Sr.
- Children: 3

Mary Lawrence (born Mary Lou Lender, May 17, 1918 – September 24, 1991) was an American actress, who had a career in film and television.

== Early years ==
Lawrence was born Mary Lou Lender in Newark, Ohio. She and her family moved to Columbus, Ohio, when she was 2 years old. Her early acting experiences came while she was in Columbus schools.

== Acting ==
While on vacation in California, Lawrence met family friend Elliott Nugent, who introduced her to Harold Lloyd. Loyd in turn gave her a part in his film, The Professor. She married soon after making the film and retired from acting to raise her children.

Lawrence eventually resumed acting, beginning with work in little theater productions. Bob Cummings was a friend of the family, and he asked her to be on his television show. She played Ruth Helm on Love That Bob from 1956 to 1958. Other television programs in which she was seen included Climax, Playhouse 90, and Dragnet. She had a recurring role in the syndicated television series Casey Jones, where she played Jones's wife Alice with Alan Hale Jr. as her husband. She also appeared in episodes of The Donna Reed Show.

Films in which Lawrence acted included No Man of Her Own, State Fair, and The Stratton Story.

== Writing ==
After Lawrence retired from acting, she turned to writing books on art. Her published works included Mother and Child (1975), Lovers (1982), and Children in Art (posthumous).

== Personal life and death ==
Lawrence married film director Delmer Daves, who wrote the screenplay for The Professor. They were wed from 1938 to 1977. Following his death she married banker Samuel Doak Young Sr. She had three children. She died of complications resulting from pneumonia on September 24, 1991, in St. John's Hospital and Health Center in Santa Monica, California, aged 73.

== Filmography ==
List of acting performances in film and television
Title	Year	Role	Notes
County Fair	1937	Julie Williams	credited as Mary Lou Lender
Numbered Woman	1938	Margie	credited as Mary Lender
Professor Beware	1938	The Bride	credited as Mary Lou Lender
Obliging Young Lady	1942	Bird Lover	Uncredited
The Stratton Story	1949	Dot	
Task Force	1949	Ruth Rankin	Uncredited
No Man of Her Own	1950	Lucy Hunt	Uncredited
The Sound of Fury	1950	Kathy	Uncredited
Night into Morning	1951	Edith Bottomly	
The Lady Says No	1951	Mary	
Code Two	1953	Girl	Uncredited
The Lady Says No	1953	Louise Malvine	Uncredited
Arena	1953	Young Woman	Uncredited
Climax!	1955		Episode: "Flight 951"
The Bob Cummings Show	1955–1958	Ruth Helm	7 episodes
A Cry in the Night	1956	Madge Taggart	
These Wilder Years	1956	Mrs. Callahan	Uncredited
Burns and Allen	1956	Dr. J.L. Hendricks' nurse	Season 6, Episode 39: "Mrs. Sohmers Needs a Psychologist"
Casey Jones	1957–1958	Alice Jones	16 episodes
The Donna Reed Show	1959	Myra Keppler	Episode: "Parting Of The Ways"
Dragnet	1959	Barbara Roxwell	Episode: "The Big Byron"
Sea Hunt	1961	Dr. Barnes	Episode: "The Aquanettes"
The Asphalt Jungle	1961	Marian Gower	Episode: "The Lady and the Lawyer"
The Lawbreakers	1961	Marian Gower	film adaptation of The Asphalt Jungle episode "The Lady and the Lawyer"
Back Street	1961	Marge Claypole	
The Best Man	1964	Mrs. Merwin	
Youngblood Hawke	1964	Mrs. Givney	Uncredited
Run for Your Life	1965	Mrs. Beaumont	Episode: "The Cold, Cold War of Paul Bryan", (final appearance)

== Bibliography ==
- — (1975). Mother and Child: 100 Works of Art with Commentaries by 106 Distinguished People. Thomas Y. Crowell Company. ISBN 9780690009705.
- — (1982). Lovers: 100 Works of Art Celebrating Romantic Love, With Commentaries by the Distinguished and the Great. A & W Publishers. ISBN 0-89479-116-8.
