= Clay Clement =

American actor (1888–1956)

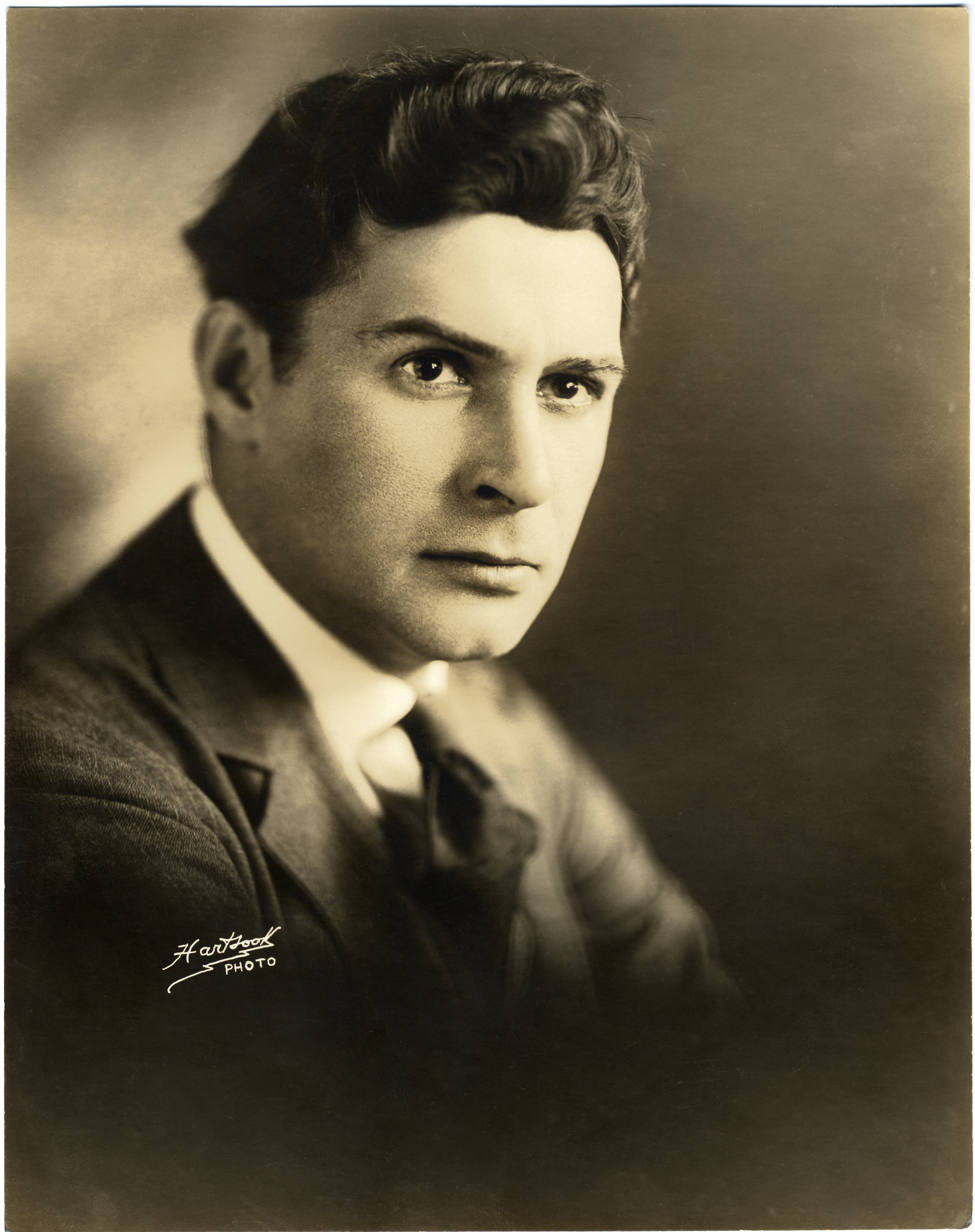
- Born: Claudius Laird Geiger; May 19, 1888; Lebanon, Ohio, U.S.
- Died: October 20, 1956 (aged 68); Watertown, New York, U.S.
- Occupation: Actor
- Years active: 1909–1952
- Spouse: Mary Frey (1888–1947; her death)
- Children: 1
- Relatives: James Kenneth Campbell (nephew); J. Kenneth Campbell (grandnephew); Kim Gruenenfelder (great-grandniece); Emma Rosenblum (great-grandniece)

Clay Clement (May 19, 1888 – October 20, 1956) was an American stage, film, and television actor. He appeared in more than 80 films between 1918 and 1947. Clement was one of the earliest members of the Screen Actors Guild. He was born in Lebanon, Ohio and died in Watertown, New York.

== Selected filmography ==
- Stolen Honor (1918) - Robert Macklin
- The Purple Lily (1918) - Frank Farnsworth
- The Heart of a Girl (1918) - J. Drake
- The Power and the Glory (1918) - Shade Buckheath
- Appearance of Evil (1918) - Charlie Royce
- The Sea Waif (1918) - Silas Jones
- Forest Rivals (1919) - Jean Dubois
- The Steel King (1919) - Arthur Whipple
- Hollywood Speaks (1932) - (uncredited)
- False Faces (1932) - Dr. Kelly (uncredited)
- Washington Merry-Go-Round (1932) - Samuel D. Marcus - Producer (uncredited)
- Evenings for Sale (1932) - Von Trask
- Manhattan Tower (1932) - Kenneth Burns
- Rasputin and the Empress (1932) - Minor Role (uncredited)
- Lawyer Man (1932) - Tony's Friend (uncredited)
- Second Hand Wife (1933) - Peter Cavendish
- The Past of Mary Holmes (1933) - G.K. Ethridge
- Tonight Is Ours (1933) - Seminoff
- Hard to Handle (1933) - Federal Man #1 (uncredited)
- The Circus Queen Murder (1933) - Lubbell (uncredited)
- The Working Man (1933) - Atkinson - Hartland Co. Man (uncredited)
- The Kiss Before the Mirror (1933) - Reporter at Trial (uncredited)
- Hold Me Tight (1933) - Blair
- The Nuisance (1933) - Judge (uncredited)
- The Silk Express (1933) - Myton Associate (uncredited)
- Don't Bet on Love (1933) - Arnold Ross, Attorney at Law (uncredited)
- Bureau of Missing Persons (1933) - Burton C. Kingman
- The World Changes (1933) - Lt. Col. George Armstrong Custer
- Son of a Sailor (1933) - Blanding (uncredited)
- Advice to the Lovelorn (1933) - Joseph C. Douglas - District Attorney (uncredited)
- Wonder Bar (1934) - Businessman (uncredited)
- Journal of a Crime (1934) - Inspector
- House of Mystery (1934) - John Prendergast aka John Pren
- Upper World (1934) - Medical Examiner (uncredited)
- Let's Be Ritzy (1934) - Mr. Hildreth
- The Thin Man (1934) - Quinn (uncredited)
- The Personality Kid (1934) - Duncan
- Now I'll Tell (1934) - Fight Fan (uncredited)
- Madame Du Barry (1934) - Nobleman at Duc de Choiseul's Meeting (uncredited)
- Side Streets (1934) - Jack
- Friends of Mr. Sweeney (1934) - Charles Cramer (uncredited)
- I Sell Anything (1934) - Peter Van Gruen
- The St. Louis Kid (1934) - Man with Gun at Flora's (uncredited)
- I Am a Thief (1934) - Man at Hoyle's Meeting (uncredited)
- Murder in the Clouds (1934) - Flight Commander
- Sweet Music (1935) - Mr. Johnson
- Dinky (1935) - Gerald Standish
- Chinatown Squad (1935) - Earl Raybold
- Don't Bet on Blondes (1935) - T. Everett Markham
- Woman Wanted (1935) - Smiley's Henchman (uncredited)
- Streamline Express (1935) - John Bradley
- Confidential (1935) - Insp. Arthur M. Preston
- Whipsaw (1935) - Harry Ames
- Hitch Hike Lady (1935) - Warden
- Two Against the World (1936) - Mr. Banning
- The Leavenworth Case (1936) - Inspector Holmes
- It Had to Happen (1936) - McCloskey - Scaffa's Attorney (uncredited)
- The Leathernecks Have Landed (1936) - Capt. Halstead
- Wife vs. Secretary (1936) - Herbert 'Herb' (uncredited)
- The Great Ziegfeld (1936) - Jack - Barber Shop Customer (uncredited)
- The First Baby (1936) - Obstetrician (uncredited)
- Let's Sing Again (1936) - Jackson
- The Three Wise Guys (1936) - Manager of Magnin's (uncredited)
- Hearts in Bondage (1936) - Lt. Worden
- Nobody's Fool (1936) - Fixer Belmore
- Bad Guy (1937) - Bronson
- Rosalie (1937) - Captain Banner
- Arson Gang Busters (1938) - Hamilton
- A Trip to Paris (1938) - Duroche
- Numbered Woman (1938)
- Straight Place and Show (1938) - Carter (uncredited)
- King of Alcatraz (1938) - Fred Cateny (uncredited)
- Disbarred (1939) - Attorney Roberts
- Off the Record (1939) - Jaeggers
- Star Reporter (1939) - Whittaker
- Society Smugglers (1939) - Anthony Harrison
- Each Dawn I Die (1939) - Stacey's Attorney
- Girl from Rio (1939) - 'Mitch' Mitchell
- The Roaring Twenties (1939) - Bramfield, the Broker (uncredited)
- Allegheny Uprising (1939) - John Penn
- Parole Fixer (1940) - Stebbins (uncredited)
- Granny Get Your Gun (1940) - Riff Daggett
- Teddy, the Rough Rider (1940, Short) - Avery D. Andrews (uncredited)
- Passport to Alcatraz (1940) - Drexel Stuyvesunt
- I'm Still Alive (1940) - Roger, First Director
- Boomerang (1947) - Judge Tate (uncredited)
- Celanese Theatre (1952, Episode: "On Borrowed Time") - Dr. Evans
