= Numbered Woman =

1938 film directed by Karl Brown

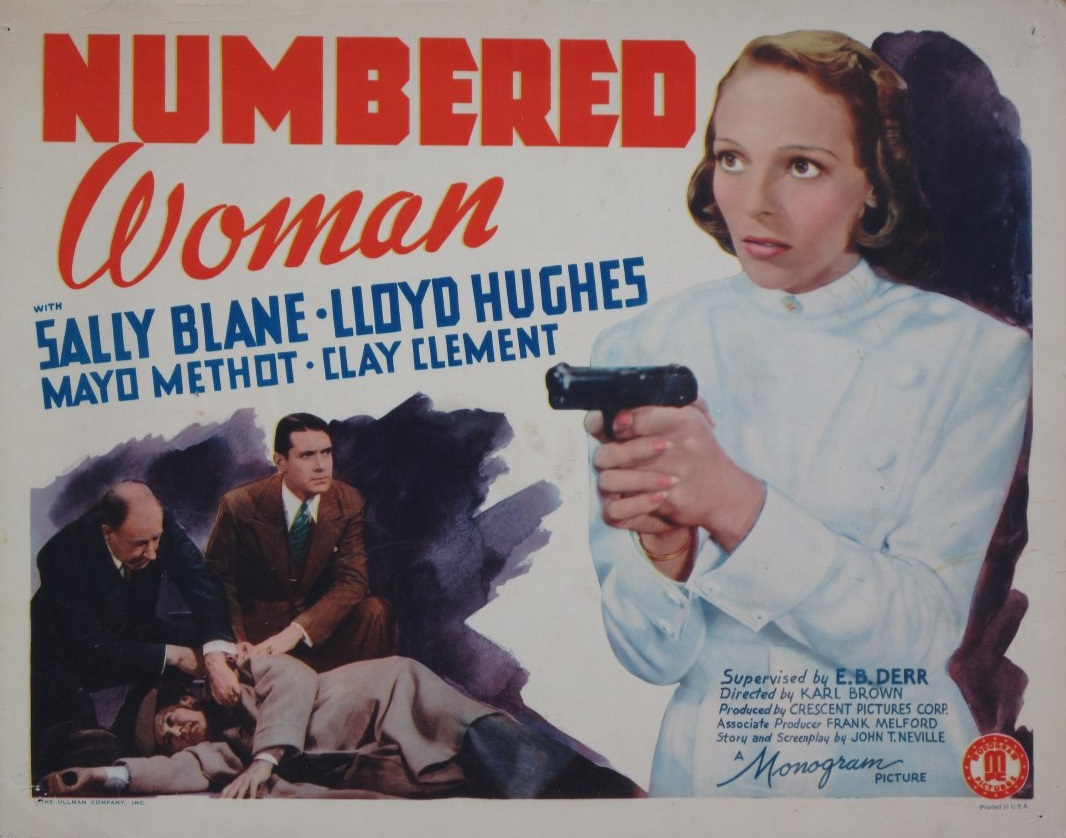
- Poster for the film
- Directed by: Karl Brown
- Written by: John T. Neville
- Produced by: E. B. Derr
- Starring: Sally Blane; Lloyd Hughes; Mayo Methot; Clay Clement
- Cinematography: Arthur Martinelli
- Edited by: Finn Ulback
- Music by: Abe Meyer
- Production company: Monogram Pictures
- Release date: May 22, 1938 (US)
- Running time: 63 minutes
- Country: United States
- Language: English

Numbered Woman is a 1938 American drama film. Directed by Karl Brown, the film stars Sally Blane, Lloyd Hughes, Mayo Methot, and Clay Clement. It was released on May 22, 1938. Its working title during production was Private Nurse.

== Cast ==
- Sally Blane as Linda Morgan
- Lloyd Hughes as Dr. Steven Russell
- Mayo Methot as Vicki
- Clay Clement as Lew Adams
- J. Farrell MacDonald as Captain Ryan
- Mary Lawrence (actress) as Margie (as Mary Lender)
- John Arledge as Tommy Morgan
- Ward Bond as Detective
- Morgan Wallace as Blake
- Robert Fiske as Ferguson
- Ralph Dunn as Red
