= Raw Timber =

1937 film

- Directed by: Ray Taylor
- Written by: John T. Neville; Bennett Cohen
- Produced by: E.B. Derr; Bernard A. Moriarty
- Starring: Tom Keene; Kathryn Keys; Budd Buster
- Cinematography: Arthur Martinelli
- Edited by: Donald Barratt
- Music by: Abe Meyer
- Production company: Crescent Pictures
- Distributed by: Crescent Pictures
- Release date: July 6, 1937
- Running time: 63 minutes
- Country: United States
- Language: English

Raw Timber is a 1937 American lumberjack Western film directed by Ray Taylor and starring Tom Keene, Kathryn Keys and Budd Buster.

The film's sets were designed by the art director Frank Dexter.

== Plot ==
Newly appointed member of the Forest Service, Tom Corbin, is concerned that the local lumber company has been logging the land too much. The company is jointly owned by the beautiful Dale McFarland and Bart Williams. Tom tells Riley, the lumber boss, that they have harvested more than they have been allowed, and Riley knocks him out cold. He is discovered and carried by Jim Hanlon and Kentuck back to the lumber company to recover. When he wakes, the first thing he does is deck Riley, and threatens to turn his boss in to Forest Service superintendent Lane, but unbeknownst to Tom, Lane is collaborating with Williams.

The Forest Service has sent an investigator to visit the logging area, but Lane suspects Jim Hanlon of being the investigator and orders Riley to shoot him. Tom protects Jim from the bullet, but the next morning, they are shot at again. The furious Hanlon tells Lane that he will report him to the department, and in response, Lane kills him. Williams uses the murder to blackmail Lane into forging permits to allow the full exploitation of the forest. To cover his tracks, Williams sends Riley to kills Lane and make it look like Tom committed the murder. Tom discovers the dying superintendent, who confesses to his misdeeds, but the sheriff arrives and arrests Tom as a suspect in the murders of both Lane and Hanlon.

Kentuck helps Tom escape, and they are pursued by the sheriff. His hideout is discovered when Riley follows Dale as she is bringing food to him, and shoots at Tom, but misses. The sheriff has witnessed Riley's unsuccessful attempt to kill Tom and puts the pieces together, that Tom is innocent and Riley is the murderer. Teaming up, Tom and the sheriff overhear Riley and Williams admit their guilt in conversation, and are swiftly arrested. Dale marries Tom and promises to manage the lumber company in an ethical manner.

== Cast ==
- Tom Keene as Tom Corbin
- Kathryn Keys as Dale McFarland
- Budd Buster as Kentuck
- Robert Fiske as Bart Williams
- Lee Phelps as Goss 'Bull' Riley
- Jack Rutherford as Supervisor Lane
- Ray Bennett as Insp. Joe Hanlon
- Bartlett A. Carre as The Coroner
- Fred Parker as Frank
- Dorothy Vernon as Housekeeper
- Slim Whitaker as Sheriff

== Bibliography ==
- Pitts, Michael R. Western Movies: A Guide to 5,105 Feature Films. McFarland, 2012.
