= Twelve Crowded Hours =

1939 film by Lew Landers

- Directed by: Lew Landers
- Written by: Garrett Fort; Peter Ruric
- Produced by: Robert Sisk
- Starring: Richard Dix; Lucille Ball
- Cinematography: Nicholas Musuraca
- Edited by: Harry Marker
- Music by: Robert Russell Bennett (uncredited)
- Production company: RKO Pictures
- Distributed by: RKO Pictures
- Release date: March 3, 1939
- Running time: 64 min
- Language: English

Twelve Crowded Hours is a 1939 drama film directed by Lew Landers and starring Richard Dix and Lucille Ball.

== Plot ==
When the brother of his girlfriend Paula Sanders is accused of murder, reporter Nick Green tries to clear him.

He suspects gangster George Costain of the crime. Nick steals a satchel of Costain's policy racket receipts, placing his life and Paula's in great danger.

== Cast ==
- Richard Dix as Nick Green
- Lucille Ball as Paula Sanders
- Allan Lane as Dave Sanders
- Donald MacBride as Det. Sgt. Joe Keller
- Cy Kendall as George Costain
- John Arledge as Red
- Emory Parnell as Doorkeeper
