= I Am a Criminal =

- Theatrical release poster
- Directed by: William Nigh
- Screenplay by: John W. Krafft
- Story by: Harrison Jacobs
- Produced by: E.B. Derr
- Starring: John Carroll; Kay Linaker; Craig Reynolds; Martin Spellman; Lester Matthews; Mary Kornman
- Cinematography: Paul Ivano
- Edited by: Russell F. Schoengarth
- Production company: Monogram Pictures
- Distributed by: Monogram Pictures
- Release date: December 7, 1938
- Running time: 74 minutes
- Country: United States
- Language: English

I Am a Criminal is a 1938 American crime film directed by William Nigh and written by John W. Krafft. The film stars John Carroll, Kay Linaker, Craig Reynolds, Martin Spellman, Lester Matthews and Mary Kornman. The film was released on December 7, 1938, by Monogram Pictures.

== Cast ==
- John Carroll as Brad McArthur
- Kay Linaker as Linda La Rue
- Craig Reynolds as Clint Reynolds
- Martin Spellman as Bobby
- Lester Matthews as District Attorney George Lane
- Mary Kornman as Alice Martin
- May Beatty as Maggie
- Robert Fiske as Attorney Phil Collins
- Byron Foulger as Ed Harper
- Edward Earle as Clark
- Jack Kennedy as Sheriff
- Allan Cavan as DeMotte
