= County Fair (1937 film) =

1937 film by Howard Bretherton

- Directed by: Howard Bretherton
- Written by: John T. Neville
- Produced by: E.B. Derr
- Starring: John Arledge; Mary Lawrence; J. Farrell MacDonald; Fuzzy Knight
- Cinematography: Arthur Martinelli
- Edited by: Donald Barratt
- Music by: Abe Meyer
- Production company: Crescent Pictures Corporation
- Distributed by: Monogram Pictures
- Release date: November 24, 1937
- Running time: 72 minutes
- Country: United States
- Language: English

County Fair is a 1937 American drama film directed by Howard Bretherton and starring John Arledge, Mary Lawrence and J. Farrell MacDonald. It was a remake of the 1932 film The County Fair.

== Cast ==
- John Arledge as John Hope
- Mary Lawrence as Julie Williams
- J. Farrell MacDonald as Calvin Williams, Julie's Father
- Fuzzy Knight as Whitey the Trainer
- Jimmy Butler as Buddy Williams, Julie's Brother
- Harry Worth as Turner the Gambler
- Matty Roubert as Snipe, Turner's Jockey
- William Hunter as Dutch, Turner Henchman
- Henry Hall as Commissioner
- Edwin Mordant as Mr. Brooks, Moon Glow's Owner

== See also ==
- List of films about horses
- List of films about horse racing

== Bibliography ==
- Langman, Larry & Ebner, David. Hollywood's Image of the South: A Century of Southern Films. Greenwood Publishing, 2001.
