= Cornered (1932 film) =

1932 film

- Directed by: B. Reeves Eason
- Written by: Ruth Todd (story); Wallace MacDonald (scenario)
- Produced by: Harry Cohn
- Starring: Tim McCoy; Shirley Grey
- Cinematography: John Stumar
- Edited by: Otto Meyer
- Music by: Mischa Bakaleinikoff
- Distributed by: Columbia Pictures
- Release date: August 5, 1932
- Running time: 62 minutes

Cornered is a 1932 American pre-Code Western film directed by B. Reeves Eason and starring Tim McCoy. It was produced and released by Columbia Pictures.

A copy is held by the Library of Congress.

== Cast ==
- Tim McCoy as Sheriff Tim Laramie
- Shirley Grey as Jane Herrick
- Noah Beery as Laughing Red Slavens
- Raymond Hatton as Deputy Jacklin
- Niles Welch as Moody Pierson
- Claire McDowell as Jane's Aunt
- Walter Long as Henchman Slade
- Walter Brennan as court clerk (uncredited)
- Edmund Cobb as ranch hand (uncredited)
- Ray Jones as townsman (uncredited)

== Plot ==
Sheriff Laramie maintains that his friend (Pierson) is innocent of murder. Laramie is fired after Pierson escapes, and the two join an outlaw gang. Laramie and Pierson are rescued, and the real killer is revealed.
