= Cyclone Prairie Rangers =

1944 film by Benjamin H. Kline

- Theatrical release poster
- Directed by: Benjamin H. Kline
- Screenplay by: Elizabeth Beecher
- Story by: Elizabeth Beecher
- Produced by: Jack Fier
- Starring: Charles Starrett; Dub Taylor; Constance Worth; Jimmie Davis; Jimmy Wakely
- Cinematography: Fayte M. Browne
- Edited by: Aaron Stell
- Production company: Columbia Pictures
- Distributed by: Columbia Pictures
- Release date: November 9, 1944
- Running time: 56 minutes
- Country: United States
- Language: English

Cyclone Prairie Rangers is a 1944 American Western film directed by Benjamin H. Kline and written by Elizabeth Beecher. The film stars Charles Starrett, Dub Taylor, Constance Worth, Jimmie Davis and Jimmy Wakely. The film was released on November 9, 1944, by Columbia Pictures.

== Cast ==
- Charles Starrett as Steve Travis
- Dub Taylor as Cannonball
- Constance Worth as Lola
- Jimmie Davis as Jimmie Davis
- Jimmy Wakely as Jimmy Wakely
- Robert Fiske as Emil Weber
- Clancy Cooper as Henry Vogel
- Ray Bennett as Sheriff Morgan
- I. Stanford Jolley as Smoke Ellis
- Eddie Phillips as Tony Johnson
- Edmund Cobb as Clem Dunphy
- Forrest Taylor as Lee Bennett
- Paul Conrad as Jim Leonard
- John Tyrrell as Doc Pearson
- Edna Harris as Waitress
- Steve Clark as Dana
