= John Arledge =

American actor (1906–1947)

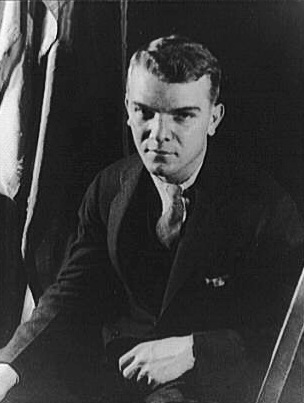
- John Arledge in 1932
- Born: Johnson Lundy Arledge; March 12, 1906; Crockett, Texas, U.S.
- Died: May 15, 1947 (aged 41); Hollywood, California, U.S.
- Occupation: Actor
- Years active: 1930–1947

Johnson Lundy Arledge (March 12, 1906 – May 15, 1947) was an American film and stage actor.

== Biography ==
He played dozens of supporting roles in the Hollywood movies of the 1930s–1940s, including the tractor driver who destroys a house in The Grapes of Wrath.

Arledge pursued engineering as a major in college, but eventually his work with a little theatre turned his interest to acting. He performed in vaudeville before taking on his first film role in 1931.

== Filmography ==
This filmography is believed to be complete.

- King of Jazz (1930) - First Pianist at Giant Piano ('Rhapsody in Blue') / Quartet Member ('Nellie') (as Johnson Arledge)
- Young Sinners (1931) – Jimmy
- Daddy Long Legs (1931) – Jimmy McBride
- The Spider (1931) – Tommy
- Heartbreak (1931) – Jerry Sommers
- After Tomorrow (1932) – Office Worker / Wedding Rehearsal Guest (uncredited)
- Disorderly Conduct (1932) – Driver with Flat Tire (uncredited)
- Careless Lady (1932) – Hank Oldfield
- Huddle (1932) – Pidge
- Week Ends Only (1932) – Ted Lane
- Hell's Highway (1932) – Carter
- Olsen's Big Moment (1933) – Harry Smith
- Jimmy and Sally (1933) – Joe
- Coming Out Party (1934) – Party Crasher (uncredited)
- Flirtation Walk (1934) – 'Spike'
- Bachelor of Arts (1934) – Robert Neal
- Devil Dogs of the Air (1935) – Mac
- Mary Jane's Pa (1935) – Linc Overman
- Old Man Rhythm (1935) – Pinky Parker
- The Farmer Takes a Wife (1935) – Man Talking About Transcontinental Railroad (uncredited)
- Shipmates Forever (1935) – Johnny 'Coxswain' Lawrence
- We're Only Human (1935) – Johnny O'Brien
- You May Be Next (1936) – Eddie House
- Two in Revolt (1936) – John Woods
- Murder on a Bridle Path (1936) – Joey Thomas
- Don't Turn 'Em Loose (1936) – Walter Clifford
- The Big Game (1936) – Spike Adams
- Big City (1937) – Buddy
- Saturday's Heroes (1937) – Ted Calkins
- County Fair (1937) – John Hope
- Prison Nurse (1938) – Mousie
- Numbered Woman (1938)
- Campus Confessions (1938) – Freddy Fry
- You Can't Cheat an Honest Man (1939) – Phineas Whipsnade
- Twelve Crowded Hours (1939) – Red
- 6,000 Enemies (1939) – Phil Donegan
- All Women Have Secrets (1939) – Joe Tucker
- Gone with the Wind (1939) – Dying Soldier (uncredited)
- The Grapes of Wrath (1940) – Davis
- The Fighting 69th (1940) – Second Alabama Man (uncredited)
- Strange Cargo (1940) – Dufond
- It's a Date (1940) – Newcomer on Ship (uncredited)
- Ski Patrol (1940) – Dick Reynolds
- Flight Angels (1940) – Mr. Perry
- City for Conquest (1940) – Salesman
- The Flag of Humanity (1940, Short) – Jeremy
- Arizona (1940) – Southern Lieutenant (uncredited)
- Cheers for Miss Bishop (1941) – 'Snapper' MacRae
- That's My Man (1947) – Thunder's Owner (uncredited)
- I Wonder Who's Kissing Her Now (1947) – Clerk (uncredited)
- Dark Passage (1947) – Lonely Man (uncredited) (final film role)
