= Criminals Within =

1941 film by Joseph H. Lewis

- DVD cover of the film
- Directed by: Joseph H. Lewis
- Screenplay by: Edward Bennett
- Story by: Arthur Hoerl
- Produced by: E. B. Derr
- Starring: Eric Linden; Ben Alexander; Donald Curtis
- Cinematography: Arthur Martinelli
- Edited by: Howard Dillinger
- Production company: Producers Releasing Corporation
- Distributed by: Producers Releasing Corporation
- Release date: June 27, 1941 (US)
- Running time: 70 minutes
- Country: United States
- Language: English

Criminals Within (also issued as Army Mystery) is a 1941 American drama film directed by Joseph H. Lewis and starring Eric Linden, Ben Alexander and Donald Curtis. It was released on June 27, 1941.

== Cast ==
- Eric Linden as Corporal Greg Carroll
- Ben Alexander as Sergeant Paul
- Donald Curtis as Lieutenant Harmon
- Ann Doran as Linda
- Constance Worth as Alma Barton
- Weldon Heyburn as Sergeant Blake
- Dudley Dickerson as Sam Dillingham
- Bernice Pilot as Mamie
- Ray Erlenborn as Private Norton
- I. Stanford Jolley as Carl Flegler
