= Cassidy of Bar 20 =

1938 film by Lesley Selander

- Directed by: Lesley Selander
- Written by: Clarence E. Mulford
- Screenplay by: Norman Houston
- Produced by: Harry Sherman
- Starring: William Boyd; Russell Hayden; Frank Darien; Nora Lane; Robert Fiske; John Elliott
- Cinematography: Russell Harlan
- Edited by: Sherman A. Rose
- Production company: Paramount Pictures
- Distributed by: Paramount Pictures
- Release date: February 25, 1938
- Running time: 56 minutes
- Country: United States
- Language: English

Cassidy of Bar 20 is a 1938 American Western film directed by Lesley Selander and written by Norman Houston. The film stars William Boyd, Russell Hayden, Frank Darien, Nora Lane, Robert Fiske and John Elliott. The film was released on February 25, 1938, by Paramount Pictures.

== Plot ==
When bad-guys begin harassing the townsfolk, Hoppy's (William Boyd) former gal Nora Blake (Nora Lane) sends him a plea for help. Hoppy is the boss of Bar 20 ranch in Texas, so he rides down the Camino Real in the New Mexico cattle country near Alamogordo.

Before he and his saddlemates, "Lucky" Jenkins (Russell Hayden) and "Pappy (Frank Darien), can reach her ranch, they are stopped by Clay Allison (Robert Fiske), a cattle-rustler who is in almost complete control of the district, and wants to extend his holdings by seizing Nora's cattle and driving her out.

Shortly before the final shoot-out the good-guys are having dinner. When the shooting begins, Pappy hurries to finish his meal before joining in the mayhem.

== Cast ==
- William Boyd as Hopalong Cassidy
- Russell Hayden as Lucky Jenkins
- Frank Darien as Pappy
- Nora Lane as Nora Blake
- Robert Fiske as Clay Allison
- John Elliott as Tom Dillon
- Margaret Marquis as Mary Dillon
- Gertrude Hoffman as Ma Caffrey
- Carleton Young as Jeff Caffrey
- Gordon Hart as Judge Belcher
- Ed Cassidy as Sheriff Hawley
