= My Old Kentucky Home (1938 film) =

1938 film by Lambert Hillyer

- Directed by: Lambert Hillyer
- Written by: John T. Neville
- Produced by: E.B. Derr; Frank Melford
- Starring: Evelyn Venable; Grant Richards; Clara Blandick
- Cinematography: Arthur Martinelli
- Edited by: Finn Ulback
- Music by: Abe Meyer
- Production company: Crescent Pictures
- Distributed by: Monogram Pictures
- Release date: February 9, 1938
- Running time: 72 minutes
- Country: United States
- Language: English

My Old Kentucky Home is a 1938 American romantic drama film directed by Lambert Hillyer and starring Evelyn Venable, Grant Richards and Clara Blandick. It takes its title from the song "My Old Kentucky Home". It was distributed by Monogram Pictures. The film's sets were designed by the art director Frank Dexter.

== Plot ==
Larry Blair is engaged to Lisbeth, but is tempted by the attractions of a female singer. When Larry suffers an accident and risks losing his sight, it is Lisbeth who nurses him back to health.

== Cast ==
- Evelyn Venable as Lisbeth Calvert
- Grant Richards as Larry Blair
- Clara Blandick as Julia 'Granny' Blair
- Bernadene Hayes as Gail Burke
- J. Farrell MacDonald as Mayor Jim Hopkins
- Margaret Marquis as Lucy Belle
- Cornelius Keefe as Trent Burke
- Kitty McHugh as Peggy Price
- Raquel Davidovich as Babette
- Paul White as Scipio-Singer
- Mildred Gover as Callio
- Hall Johnson as Leader of the Hall Johnson Choir

== Bibliography ==
- John E. Kleber. The Kentucky Encyclopedia. University Press of Kentucky, 2015.
