= Battle of Greed =

1937 film by Howard Higgin

- Film poster
- Directed by: Howard Higgin
- Written by: John T. Neville
- Produced by: E.B. Derr; Bernard A. Moriarty
- Starring: Tom Keene; Gwynne Shipman; James Bush
- Cinematography: Paul Ivano
- Edited by: Donald Barratt
- Music by: Abe Meyer
- Production company: Crescent Pictures
- Distributed by: Crescent Pictures
- Release date: January 18, 1937
- Running time: 65 minutes
- Country: United States
- Language: English

Battle of Greed is a 1937 American Western film directed by Howard Higgin and starring Tom Keene, Gwynne Shipman and James Bush.

The film's sets were designed by the art director Edward C. Jewell.

== Plot ==
A silver strike in Virginia City leads to cutthroat completion to exploit the discovery.

== Cast ==
- Tom Keene as John Storm
- Gwynne Shipman as Linda Avery
- James Bush as Mark Twain
- Jimmy Butler as Danny Storm
- Robert Fiske as Hammond
- Carl Stockdale as Sawyer
- Ray Bennett as Henchman Bates
- William Worthington as Judge William H. Avery
- Henry Roquemore as Judge Albion
- Foxy Callahan as Jockey Brown
- Lloyd Ingraham as Virginny
- Budd Buster as Comstock

== Bibliography ==
- Pitts, Michael R. Western Movies: A Guide to 5,105 Feature Films. McFarland, 2012.
