= Under Strange Flags =

1937 US film directed by I. V. Willat

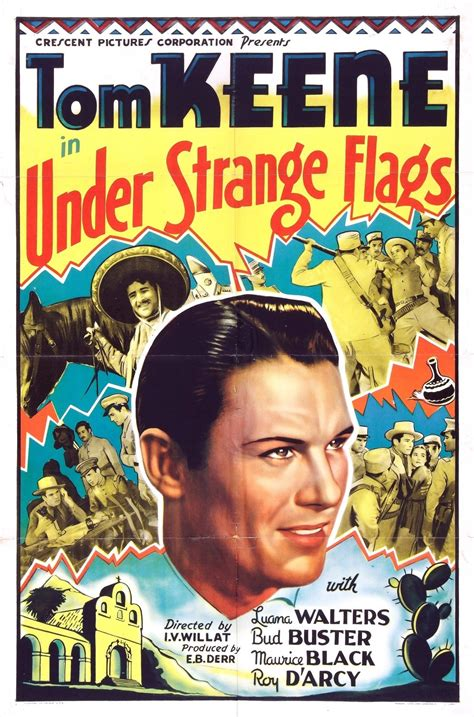
- Film poster
- Directed by: I. V. Willat
- Screenplay by: Mary Ireland (scenario)
- Story by: John H. Auer
- Produced by: E. B. Derr
- Starring: Tom Keene; Luana Walters; Maurice Black
- Cinematography: Arthur Martinelli
- Production company: Crescent Pictures
- Release date: August 16, 1937 (US)
- Running time: 64 minutes
- Country: United States
- Language: English

Under Strange Flags is a 1937 American drama film directed by I. V. Willat and starring Tom Keene, Luana Walters, and Maurice Black. It was released on August 16, 1937. During production, it was also titled South of Sonora and Beyond Victory at various times.

== Cast ==
- Tom Keene as Tom Kenyon
- Luana Walters as Dolores de Vargas
- Maurice Black as Pancho Villa
- Chris-Pin Martin as Lopez
- Budd Buster as Tequila
- Ernest Gillen as Garcia
- Jane Wolfe as Mrs. Kenyon
- Paul Sutton as General Barranca
- Roy D'Arcy as Morales
- Paul Barrett as Denny de Vargas
