= Timber Stampede =

1939 US film directed by David Howard

- Directed by: David Howard; Kenneth Holmes (assistant)
- Written by: Paul Franklin; Bernard McConville
- Screenplay by: Morton Grant
- Produced by: Bert Gilroy
- Starring: George O'Brien; Chill Wills; Marjorie Reynolds
- Cinematography: Harry Wild
- Edited by: Frederic Knudtson
- Music by: Roy Webb
- Production company: RKO Radio Pictures
- Distributed by: RKO Pictures
- Release date: June 30, 1939 (US)
- Running time: 59 minutes
- Country: United States
- Language: English

Timber Stampede is a 1939 American Western film directed by David Howard from a screenplay by Morton Grant, based on a story by Bernard McConville and Paul Franklin. The film stars George O'Brien, Chill Wills, and Marjorie Reynolds. RKO Radio Pictures produced and distributed the film, which was released on June 30, 1939.

== Cast ==
- George O'Brien as Scott Baylor
- Chill Wills as Whopper Hatch
- Marjorie Reynolds as Anne Carr
- Morgan Wallace as Dunlap
- Robert Fiske as Matt Chaflin
- Guy Usher as Jay Jones
- Earl Dwire as Henry Clay Baylor
- Frank Hagney as Champ - Henchman
- Bob Burns as Sheriff Lyman
- Monte Montague as Jake
- Bud Osborne as Brady
