= Edna Lawrence =

American model and film actress

- Born: March 1, 1916; Harris County, Texas; United States
- Died: October 29, 1995 (aged 79); Los Angeles, California; United States
- Occupations: Actress, Model
- Years active: 1934 - 1940 (film)

Edna Lawrence (1916–1995) was an American model and film actress.

== Selected filmography ==
- Drums of Destiny (1937)
- Rancho Grande (1940)

== Bibliography ==
- Pitts, Michael R. Western Movies: A Guide to 5,105 Feature Films. McFarland, 2012.
