= Girl from Rio (1939 film) =

1939 film directed by Lambert Hillyer

The Code of the Mounted
- Directed by: Lambert Hillyer
- Written by: Milton Raison; John Thomas Neville
- Produced by: E. B. Derr
- Starring: Movita; Warren Hull; Alan Baldwin
- Cinematography: Paul Ivano
- Edited by: Robert S. Golden; Russell Schoengarth
- Production company: Monogram Pictures
- Release date: August 7, 1939 (US)
- Running time: 63 minutes
- Country: United States
- Language: English

Girl from Rio is a 1939 American drama film directed by Lambert Hillyer from a screenplay by Milton Raison and John Thomas Neville. The film stars Movita, Warren Hull, and Alan Baldwin.

== Plot ==
Marquita Romero is a singer in Rio de Janeiro, is engaged to an American newspaper reporter, Steven Ward. The day before she is to have her theatrical singing debut in Rio de Janeiro, she receives a call from New York City. Her brother, Carlos, has been arrested and charged with murder. She decides to rush to his side. When she arrives in New York City, she talks to Carlos' wife, Annette Templeton, and learns that the charges stem from the fire which engulfed the club where they were both performing. Carlos and Annette had been fired shortly before the fire, due to the club owner's jealousy over Carlos and Annette's relationship. The day after he fired them, Mitchell, the club owner, asked to speak with Carlos at the club. After their meeting, Carlos leaves, and the club burns down, which also results in a death. When Marquita goes to discuss the case with Carlos' attorney, she finds out that the attorney believes Carlos to be guilty, and has no plans to offer a significant defense.

Ward has followed his fiancé to New York. Learning the story from Marquita, he engages the help of an old friend, Robert Montgomery, who is a renowned New York attorney, and Montgomery agrees to represent Carlos. Ward uncovers the fact that Mitchell has had several clubs burn down, and has collected numerous insurance claims on the fires. With this evidence in hand, he approaches the investigator for the Pyramid Fire Insurance Company, Dennis Slater, hoping that he would dig deeper. However, Slater does not take up the investigation, instead demanding that Ward find more incriminating evidence.

Stymied, Marquita goes undercover at another one of Mitchell's clubs as a singer. Shortly after she arrives at the club, Mitchell's girlfriend becomes jealous, and decides to look into her history. She uncovers the fact that Marquita is Carlos' sister, and tells Mitchell about her. Mitchell confronts her in his office, and is threatening to kill her, when Marquita grabs Mitchell's gun and fires it at him. She misses, but the incendiary rounds in the weapon start a fire, which uncovers how Mitchell started all the other fires. As the fire spreads, Ward arrive to rescue Marquita. The following day Mitchell is arrested, and Marquita and Carlos return to their home in Rio de Janeiro.

== Cast ==
- Movita as Marquita Romero
- Warren Hull as Steven Ward
- Alan Baldwin as Carlos
- Kay Linaker as Vicki
- Clay Clement as Mitchell
- Pamela Blake (credited Adele Pearce) as Annette Templeton
- Soledad Jiménez (credited as Soledad Jiminez) as Lola
- Richard Tucker as Roger Montgomery
- Dennis Moore as Collins
