= Ray Bennett (actor) =

American film, stage and television actor

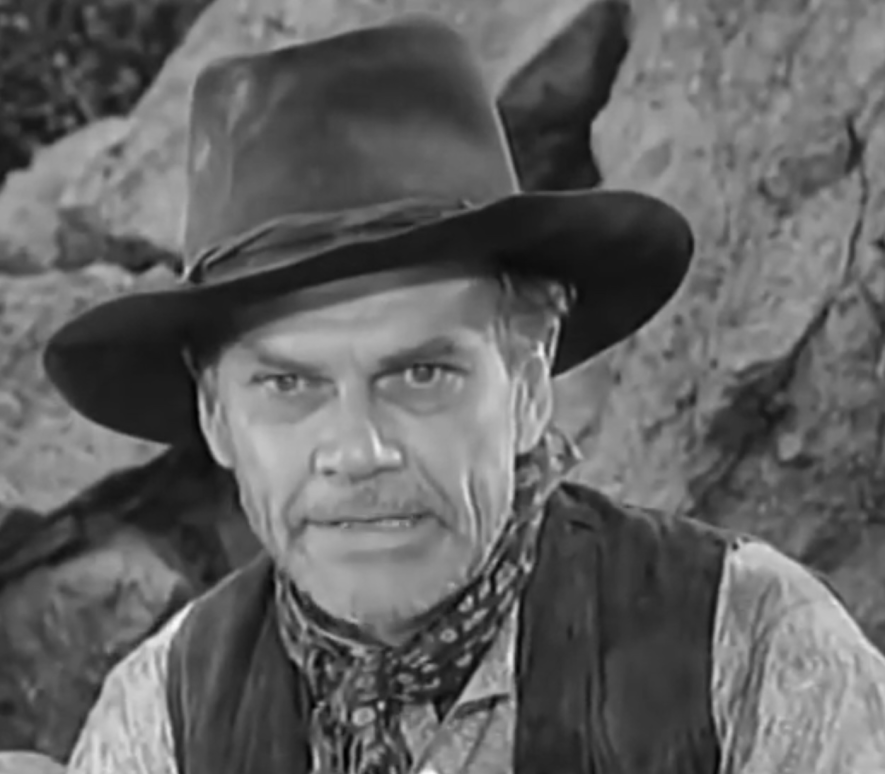
- Bennett in The Lone Ranger, 1949
- Born: Raphael Fabian Bennett; March 21, 1895; Portland, Oregon, U.S.
- Died: December 18, 1957 (aged 62); Hollywood, California, U.S.
- Occupations: Film, stage and television actor

Raphael Fabian Bennett (March 21, 1895 – December 18, 1957) was an American film, stage and television actor. He was best known for playing Leach Killgrain in the 1941 film The Return of Daniel Boone.

== Life and career ==
Bennett was born in Portland, Oregon, the son of George Bennett and Ella Costillo, a writer. He began his stage career in 1917, playing numerous roles with stage groups in California. During his stage career, in 1922, he appeared in the stage play The Prodigal Son at the Gamut Theater. He then began his screen career in 1937, appearing in the film Battle of Greed, playing Henchman Bates. In the same year, he appeared in the films Old Louisiana, Parole Racket, Racketeers in Exile, Motor Madness, The Frame-Up, Drums of Destiny, Forlorn River, Raw Timber, The Devil's Saddle Legion, Public Cowboy No. 1, The Firefly, Luck of Roaring Camp and Texas Trail.

Later in his career, Bennett guest-starred in television programs including Gunsmoke, The Life and Legend of Wyatt Earp, The Roy Rogers Show, Adventures of Superman and Death Valley Days. In 1938, He played Black Bart Taggart in the film The Lone Ranger, and in 1941, he starred as Leach Killgrain in the film The Return of Daniel Boone, starring along with Wild Bill Elliott, Betty Miles, Dub Taylor, Walter Soderling and Carl Stockdale. He appeared in numerous films such as Strange Lady in Town, Frontier Revenge, Woman of the North Country, Black Bart, Man from the Black Hills, Rimfire, Cyclone Prairie Rangers, Texas Renegades, Hidden Gold, Gauchos of Eldorado and Thunder Over the Prairie. He last appeared in the syndicated anthology television series Target.

== Death ==
Bennett died on December 18, 1957, of a heart attack in Hollywood, California, at the age of 62.
