= Lee Phelps =

American actor (1893–1953)

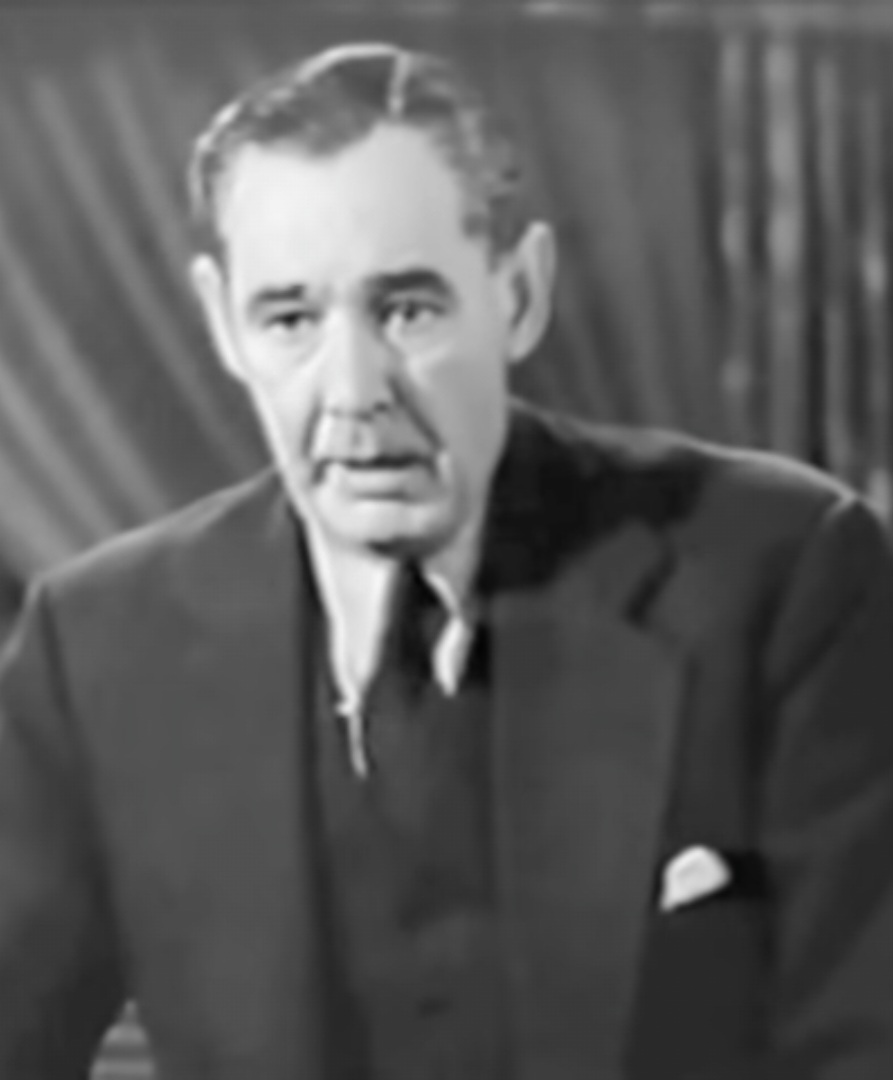
- Phelps in Female Fugitive (1938)
- Born: Napoleon Bonaparte Kukuck; May 15, 1893; Philadelphia, Pennsylvania, U.S.
- Died: March 19, 1953 (aged 59); Los Angeles, California, U.S.
- Occupation: Actor
- Years active: 1917–1953
- Spouse(s): Mary Warren (m.1916)
- Children: 2

Lee Phelps (born Napoleon Bonaparte Kukuck; May 15, 1893 – March 19, 1953) was an American film actor. He appeared in more than 600 films between 1917 and 1953, mainly in uncredited roles. He also appeared in three films that won the Academy Award for Best Picture (Grand Hotel, You Can't Take It with You, and Gone with the Wind).

Phelps appeared in the 1952 episode "Outlaw's Paradise" as a judge in the syndicated western television series, The Adventures of Kit Carson, starring Bill Williams in the title role. He also appeared in a 1952 TV episode (#90) of The Lone Ranger.

== Personal life ==
In 1916, Lee Phelps married actress Mary Warren. They had two daughters, Marilee and Patricia.

== Death ==
Phelps died in his home March 19, 1953.

== Selected filmography ==
- The Fuel of Life (1917)
- Limousine Life (1918)
- False Ambition (1918) as Peter van Dixon
- The Reckoning Day (1918)
- The Secret Code (1918)
- The Little Shepherd of Kingdom Come (1920)
- The Freshie (1922)
- Baby Clothes (1926)
- Putting Pants on Philip (1927)
- Anna Christie (1930) as Larry
- The Divorcee (1930)
- Danger Lights (1930)
- Paid (1930)
- No Limit (1931)
- Strangers May Kiss (1931)
- The Last Parade (1931)
- The Champ (1931)
- Vanity Street (1932)
- Bedtime Worries (1933)
- Transatlantic Merry-Go-Round (1934)
- Among the Missing (1934)
- Murder in the Private Car (1934) (uncredited)
- The Boss Rider of Gun Creek (1936)
- The Magnificent Brute (1936)
- Palm Springs (off screen credit) (1936)
- Raw Timber (1937)
- Under Suspicion (1937)
- The Gladiator (1938)
- Female Fugitive (1938)
- Boys' Reformatory (1939)
- The Roaring Twenties (1939) as Bailiff (uncredited)
- Kid Nightingale (1939)
- The Philadelphia Story (1940)
- The Bride Came C.O.D. (1941) as Policeman (uncredited)
- War Dogs (1942)
- Saboteur (1942) as Plant Security Officer (uncredited)
- Girls of the Big House (1945)
- Gun Law Justice (1949)
- Timber Fury (1950)
- Desperadoes of the West (1953)
