= John T. Neville =

American screenwriter

- Born: December 29, 1886; Harrisonville, Missouri; United States
- Died: October 25, 1970 (aged 83); Los Angeles, California; United States
- Occupation: Writer
- Years active: 1927 - 1946 (film)

John T. Neville (1886–1970) was an American screenwriter.

== Selected filmography ==
- Her Mad Night (1932)
- Behind Jury Doors (1932)
- Malay Nights (1932)
- Sister to Judas (1932)
- Revenge at Monte Carlo (1933)
- Alimony Madness (1933)
- Her Resale Value (1933)
- Ticket to a Crime (1934)
- Rebellion (1936)
- Ridin' On (1936)
- The Lion's Den (1936)
- Battle of Greed (1937)
- Drums of Destiny (1937)
- Raw Timber (1937)
- County Fair (1937)
- My Old Kentucky Home (1938)
- Numbered Woman (1938)
- Never Give a Sucker an Even Break (1941)
- Shake Hands with Murder (1944)

== Bibliography ==
- Pitts, Michael R. Western Movies: A Guide to 5,105 Feature Films. McFarland, 2012.
