= Old Louisiana =

1937 film by Irvin Willat

- Directed by: Irvin Willat
- Starring: Tom Keene, Rita Hayworth, and Will Morgan
- Cinematography: Arthur Martinelli
- Production company: Crescent Pictures
- Distributed by: Crescent Pictures
- Release date: 1937
- Running time: 60 minutes
- Country: United States
- Language: English

Old Louisiana is a 1937 American Western film, directed by Irvin Willat. It stars Tom Keene, Rita Hayworth, and Will Morgan.
