= Abe Meyer =

American composer (1901–1969)

- Born: January 26, 1901; Brooklyn, New York, United States
- Died: May 1969 (aged 68); Los Angeles, California; United States
- Occupations: Composer, musical director, talent agent
- Years active: 1923–1940 (film); 1940-1962 (agency)

Abe Meyer (1901–1969) was an American composer of film scores. He pioneered the practice of making stock music available to movie producers, beginning in 1930.

== Career ==
In the early 1920s Meyer was hired as confidential secretary for symphonic conductor Hugo Riesenfeld, and soon became Riesenfeld's assistant and business representative. In 1923 Riesenfeld and Meyer joined forces with Broadway star Eddie Cantor for Cantor's first motion picture, A Few Moments with Eddie Cantor, an experimental talking picture produced by inventor Lee de Forest.

In January 1926 Riesenfeld and Meyer made their offices in the new Steinway Hall in New York City. That same year Meyer gained his first experience in tailoring music to film when he prepared several three-minute silent films for Raquel Meller, international singing star making stage presentations in New York; Meyer's films were shown to set the mood and atmosphere for each of Meller's Spanish-language songs. In June 1926 Meyer became Riesenfeld's business partner. An enterprising businessman then in his late twenties, Meyer incorporated in March 1928. Still working out of Steinway Hall, Meyer booked musical talent for movie theaters and private entertainments.

== New direction ==
Meyer made the transition from stage presentations to the new field of talking pictures, with Riesenfeld -- and by extension, Meyer -- approached by several producers to provide 12 musical scores for their feature-length productions. Five of these were for the independent Tiffany-Stahl studio, which hired Meyer in 1929 as "supervisor of music and sound effects." By December 1929, Meyer was supervising his own staff of songwriters and orchestra conductors who worked on a freelance basis. Meyer himself took charge of all arrangements and synchronization for Abe Meyer, Inc.

In 1930 Meyer opened a new concern, Abe Meyer Synchronizing Service, Ltd., which found immediate acceptance. Meyer carefully built up an extensive library of musical themes, recorded by a full orchestra and suitable for any kind of movie scene. He sold his selections to producers by the amount of film footage needed. For example, if a producer needed five minutes of music for a radio-studio scene, Meyer had the appropriate music on file. This became a very lucrative business, especially helpful to independent producers who couldn't afford their own permanent staff of composers and musicians. Dozens of feature films, westerns, and serials of the 1930s have musical scores throughout, all credited to Abe Meyer. In 1934 he moved to larger quarters at the General Service Studio in Hollywood.

A 1935 dispatch by syndicated columnist Hubbard Keavy, titled "Music by the Foot", described how the Abe Meyer operation serviced a typical customer: "For $80 you can get 200 feet of 'Home, Sweet Home' or a hi-de-ho fox trot or the 'chase and fight' music so essential to the horse opera. The sale of canned music to the movies has become a major enterprise and a virtual monopoly in the hands of Abe Meyer. Meyer's library, with its 5,000 titles, furnishes the music, and incidentally the sound effects, for about 90 percent of the independent product. His basic rate for music is 40 cents a foot for the first 200 feet, 30 cents for the next 200, and 25 cents for the balance. This might be a typical music order for a western: something snappy like 'Pony Boy' for the main title, 120 feet; 'Home, Sweet Home' for the opening scenes, 180 feet; music for the death scene, 110 feet; for the last reel, in which occur the inevitable chase and fight, about 500 feet; and 70 feet of 'love music' for the sweethearts' reunion. The bill for this comes to $285."

Abe Meyer had a standing arrangement with Universal Pictures as a music contractor, usually working without screen credit, to provide suitable music for action pictures. The biggest of these productions was the ambitious Sutter's Gold (1936); he also compiled scores for Universal's Buck Jones westerns and the original Flash Gordon serial. Perhaps his most ambitious score was for the 1938 Columbia serial The Secret of Treasure Island, which employed many original and novel musical effects not typically heard in Meyer's library scores.

In 1938 the musicians' union, the American Federation of Musicians, came out strongly against the widespread use of "canned music". An Associated Press report explained: "Musicians get $10 an hour, with a three-hour minimum, for movie work. That explains why the smaller producers keep Abe Meyer in business. Meyer, who would have to junk his 2,000,000-foot library, isn't worried. He says he'll just reorganize and record fresh tracks for his clients." Meyer joined the staff of Monogram Pictures as its musical director in 1938.

== Career change ==
By 1940, nine of Hollywood's 11 established movie studios dominated the production of motion pictures and had their own self-contained music departments; only Monogram and PRC did not. Most of the smaller independent companies (Tiffany, World Wide, Tower, Majestic, Mayfair, Chesterfield, Reliable, Grand National, Resolute, Superior, Spectrum, Puritan, Metropolitan, etc.) had disappeared from the scene. Facing a smaller customer base, Abe Meyer gave up his career serving the motion picture industry and returned to his 1920s specialty of handling musical performers; in 1942 he became a talent agent with MCA, and worked in the agency's "music-picture department" out of the Beverly Hills office. By November 1942, 11 MCA employees joined the armed forces, including Abe Meyer; Meyer was later honorably discharged from the U. S. Army (he was then in his early forties).

With Meyer no longer supplying stock music, producers of the 1940s turned instead to Lee Zahler, another composer with his own library of orchestral scores.

Meyer became head of MCA's music department in 1950 and retired from that organization in 1962. Since the 1920s his business interests often took him to other countries and he became a seasoned traveler, spending annual vacations in Tahiti. He devoted his remaining years to world travel, and died in Los Angeles in 1969.

== Selected filmography ==
- Painted Faces (1929)
- Honeymoon Lane (1931)
- Unholy Love (1932)
- A Strange Adventure (1932)
- The Return of Chandu (1934, serial)
- Take the Stand (1934)
- Legong (1935)
- The Unwelcome Stranger (1935)
- School for Girls (1935)
- The New Adventures of Tarzan (1935, serial)
- Suicide Squad (1935)
- The Mine with the Iron Door (1936)
- The Devil on Horseback (1936)
- Song of the Trail (1936)
- In His Steps (1936)
- County Fair (1937)
- The 13th Man (1937)
- Raw Timber (1937)
- Roaring Timber (1937)
- The Law Commands (1937)
- The Painted Trail (1938)
- My Old Kentucky Home (1938)
- The Secret of Treasure Island (1938, serial)
- Saleslady (1938)
- Gun Packer (1938)
- Numbered Woman (1938)
- The Marines Are Here (1938)
- Fisherman's Wharf (1939)
- Undercover Agent (1939)
