= List of American films of 1941 =

American films released in 1941

Around 500 American feature films were released in 1941.

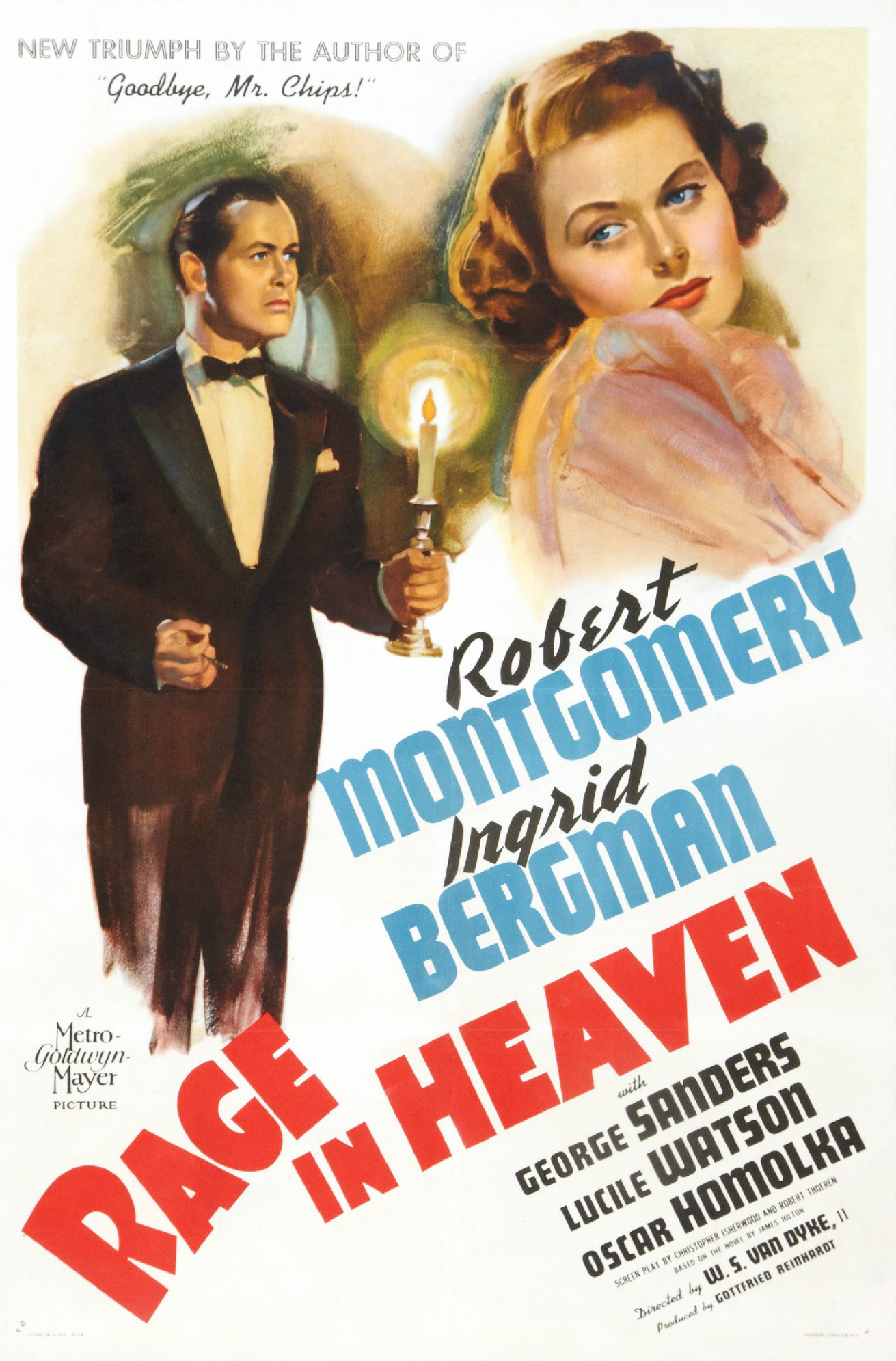
Rage in Heaven starring Robert Montgomery and Ingrid Bergman.

How Green Was My Valley won Best Picture at the Academy Awards.

== A–B ==
Title	Director	Cast	Genre	Notes
Accent on Love	Ray McCarey	George Montgomery, Osa Massen, J. Carrol Naish	Drama	20th Century Fox
Across the Sierras	D. Ross Lederman	Wild Bill Elliott, Luana Walters, Richard Fiske	Western	Columbia
Adam Had Four Sons	Gregory Ratoff	Ingrid Bergman, Warner Baxter, Susan Hayward	Drama	Columbia
Adventure in Washington	Alfred E. Green	Herbert Marshall, Virginia Bruce, Gene Reynolds	Drama	Columbia
Affectionately Yours	Lloyd Bacon	Merle Oberon, Rita Hayworth, Dennis Morgan	Comedy	Warner Bros.
All-American Co-Ed	Leroy Prinz	Frances Langford, Johnny Downs, Marjorie Woodworth	Comedy	United Artists
Aloma of the South Seas	Alfred Santell	Dorothy Lamour, Jon Hall, Katherine DeMille	Adventure	Paramount
Along the Rio Grande	Edward Killy	Tim Holt, Betty Jane Rhodes, Ruth Clifford	Western	RKO
Among the Living	Stuart Heisler	Albert Dekker, Susan Hayward, Frances Farmer	Horror	Paramount
Andy Hardy's Private Secretary	George B. Seitz	Lewis Stone, Mickey Rooney, Kathryn Grayson	Family	MGM
Angels with Broken Wings	Bernard Vorhaus	Jane Frazee, Mary Lee, Binnie Barnes	Comedy	Republic
The Apache Kid	George Sherman	Don "Red" Barry, Lynn Merrick, LeRoy Mason	Western	Republic
Appointment for Love	William A. Seiter	Charles Boyer, Margaret Sullavan, Rita Johnson	Romantic comedy	Universal
Arizona Bound	Spencer Gordon Bennet	Buck Jones, Tim McCoy, Luana Walters	Western	Monogram
Arizona Cyclone	Joseph H. Lewis	Johnny Mack Brown, Fuzzy Knight, Nell O'Day	Western	Universal
Arkansas Judge	Frank McDonald	Roy Rogers, Veda Ann Borg, Pauline Moore	Western	Republic
Babes on Broadway	Busby Berkeley	Judy Garland, Mickey Rooney, Fay Bainter	Musical	MGM; third in Berkeley's backyard musicals
Bachelor Daddy	Harold Young	Edward Everett Horton, Donald Woods, Evelyn Ankers	Comedy	Universal
Back in the Saddle	Lew Landers	Gene Autry, Smiley Burnette, Mary Lee	Western	Republic
Back Street	Robert Stevenson	Charles Boyer, Margaret Sullavan, Richard Carlson	Drama	Universal. Remake of the 1932 film
Badlands of Dakota	Alfred E. Green	Robert Stack, Frances Farmer, Richard Dix	Western	Universal
The Bad Man	Richard Thorpe	Wallace Beery, Lionel Barrymore, Laraine Day	Western	MGM
Bad Man of Deadwood	Joseph Kane	Roy Rogers, Carol Adams, Sally Blane	Western	Republic
Bad Men of Missouri	Ray Enright	Jane Wyman, Dennis Morgan, Wayne Morris	Western	Warner Bros.
Bahama Passage	Edward H. Griffith	Sterling Hayden, Madeleine Carroll, Flora Robson	Adventure	Paramount
Ball of Fire	Howard Hawks	Gary Cooper, Barbara Stanwyck, Oskar Homolka	Comedy	RKO. Remade as a musical in 1948
The Bandit Trail	Edward Killy	Tim Holt, Ray Whitley, Janet Waldo	Western	RKO
Barnacle Bill	Richard Thorpe	Wallace Beery, Marjorie Main, Leo Carrillo	Comedy	MGM
Bedtime Story	Alexander Hall	Loretta Young, Fredric March, Robert Benchley	Comedy	Columbia; Remade as a 1964 film
Belle Starr	Irving Cummings	Gene Tierney, Randolph Scott, Dana Andrews	Western	20th Century Fox
The Big Boss	Charles Barton	Otto Kruger, Gloria Dickson, John Litel	Crime	Columbia
The Big Store	Charles Reisner	Marx Brothers, Tony Martin, Virginia Grey	Comedy	Last of the Marx Brothers’ films with MGM
Billy the Kid	David Miller	Robert Taylor, Brian Donlevy, Ian Hunter	Western	MGM. Remake of 1930 film Billy the Kid
Billy the Kid's Fighting Pals	Sam Newfield	Bob Steele, Carleton Young, Al St. John	Western	PRC
Billy the Kid in Santa Fe	Sam Newfield	Bob Steele, Marin Sais, Rex Lease	Western	PRC
Billy the Kid's Range War	Sam Newfield	Bob Steele, Joan Barclay, Carleton Young	Western	PRC
Billy the Kid's Round-Up	Sam Newfield	Buster Crabbe, Carleton Young, Joan Barclay	Western	PRC
Billy the Kid Wanted	Sam Newfield	Buster Crabbe, Dave O'Brien, Glenn Strange	Western	PRC
Birth of the Blues	Victor Schertzinger	Bing Crosby, Mary Martin, Brian Donlevy	Musical	Paramount
The Black Cat	Albert S. Rogell	Basil Rathbone, Broderick Crawford, Bela Lugosi	Horror	Universal. Based on the short story by Edgar Allan Poe
Blonde Comet	William Beaudine	Virginia Vale, Robert Kent, Vince Barnett	Action	PRC
The Blonde from Singapore	Edward Dmytryk	Florence Rice, Leif Erickson, Alexander D'Arcy	Drama	Columbia
Blonde Inspiration	Busby Berkeley	John Shelton, Virginia Grey, Albert Dekker	Comedy	MGM
Blondie Goes Latin	Frank R. Strayer	Penny Singleton, Arthur Lake, Tito Guízar	Comedy	Columbia
Blondie in Society	Frank R. Strayer	Penny Singleton, Arthur Lake, Jonathan Hale	Comedy	Columbia
Blood and Sand	Rouben Mamoulian	Tyrone Power, Linda Darnell, Rita Hayworth	Drama	20th Century Fox. Previously made in both 1922 and 1916
Blossoms in the Dust	Mervyn LeRoy	Greer Garson, Walter Pidgeon, Felix Bressart	Drama	MGM. 4 Academy Award nominations
Blues in the Night	Anatole Litvak	Priscilla Lane, Betty Field, Lloyd Nolan	Musical	Warner Bros.
The Body Disappears	D. Ross Lederman	Jeffrey Lynn, Jane Wyman, Edward Everett Horton	Comedy	Warner Bros.
Border Vigilantes	Derwin Abrahams	William Boyd, Russell Hayden, Frances Gifford	Western	Paramount
Borrowed Hero	Lewis D. Collins	Florence Rice, Alan Baxter, Constance Worth	Drama	Monogram
Bowery Blitzkrieg	Wallace Fox	East Side Kids, Keye Luke, Warren Hull	Comedy	Monogram
The Bride Came C.O.D.	William Keighley	James Cagney, Bette Davis, Eugene Pallette	Comedy	Warner Bros.
The Bride Wore Crutches	Shepard Traube (1907–1983)	Lynne Roberts, Robert Armstrong, Edgar Kennedy	Comedy	20th Century Fox
Broadway Limited	Gordon Douglas	Victor McLaglen, Patsy Kelly, ZaSu Pitts	Comedy	United Artists
Buck Privates	Arthur Lubin	Abbott and Costello, Lee Bowman, Jane Frazee	Comedy	Universal
Bullets for O'Hara	William K. Howard	Joan Perry, Roger Pryor, Anthony Quinn	Crime	Warner Bros.
Burma Convoy	Noel M. Smith	Charles Bickford, Evelyn Ankers, Cecil Kellaway	Drama	Universal
Bury Me Not on the Lone Prairie	Ray Taylor	Johnny Mack Brown, Fuzzy Knight, Nell O'Day	Western	Universal
Buy Me That Town	Eugene Forde	Constance Moore, Lloyd Nolan, Albert Dekker	Comedy	Paramount

== C–D ==
Title	Director	Cast	Genre	Notes
Cadet Girl	Ray McCarey	Carole Landis, George Montgomery, William Tracy	Musical comedy	20th Century Fox
The Case of the Black Parrot	Noel M. Smith	William Lundigan, Maris Wrixon, Paul Cavanagh	Mystery	Warner Bros.
Caught in the Act	Jean Yarbrough	Henry Armetta, Iris Meredith, Inez Palange	Comedy	PRC
Caught in the Draft	David Butler	Bob Hope, Dorothy Lamour, Eddie Bracken	Comedy	Paramount
Charley's Aunt	Archie Mayo	Jack Benny, Kay Francis, Anne Baxter	Comedy	20th Century Fox
Charlie Chan in Rio	Harry Lachman	Sidney Toler, Victor Sen Yung, Kay Linaker	Mystery	20th Century Fox
Cheers for Miss Bishop	Tay Garnett	Martha Scott, William Gargan, Edmund Gwenn	Drama	Universal
The Chocolate Soldier	Roy Del Ruth	Nelson Eddy, Risë Stevens, Nigel Bruce	Musical	MGM
Citadel of Crime	George Sherman	Robert Armstrong, Linda Hayes, Frank Albertson	Drama	Republic
Citizen Kane	Orson Welles	Orson Welles, Joseph Cotten, Dorothy Comingore	Drama	RKO; Academy Award Best Original Screenplay; voted AFI and Sight & Sound greatest film of all time
City of Missing Girls	Elmer Clifton	Astrid Allwyn, H. B. Warner, John Archer	Crime	Independent
Come Live with Me	Clarence Brown	James Stewart, Hedy Lamarr, Ian Hunter	Comedy	MGM
Confessions of Boston Blackie	Edward Dmytryk	Chester Morris, Harriet Hilliard, Richard Lane	Mystery	Columbia
Confirm or Deny	Archie Mayo	Don Ameche, Joan Bennett, Roddy McDowall	War drama	20th Century Fox
The Corsican Brothers	Gregory Ratoff	Douglas Fairbanks Jr., Ruth Warrick, Akim Tamiroff	Swashbuckler	United Artists
Country Fair	Frank McDonald	June Clyde, Eddie Foy Jr., William Demarest	Comedy	Republic
The Cowboy and the Blonde	Ray McCarey	Mary Beth Hughes, George Montgomery, Alan Mowbray	Comedy	20th Century Fox
Cracked Nuts	Edward F. Cline	Stuart Erwin, Una Merkel, Mischa Auer	Comedy	Universal
Criminals Within	Joseph H. Lewis	Eric Linden, Ann Doran, Ben Alexander	Drama	PRC
Cyclone on Horseback	Edward Killy	Tim Holt, Marjorie Reynolds, Ray Whitley	Western	RKO
Dance Hall	Irving Pichel	Carole Landis, Cesar Romero, June Storey	Romance	20th Century Fox
A Dangerous Game	John Rawlins	Richard Arlen, Andy Devine, Jean Brooks	Mystery	Universal
Dangerous Lady	Bernard B. Ray	Neil Hamilton, June Storey, Evelyn Brent	Mystery	PRC
Dangerously They Live	Robert Florey	John Garfield, Nancy Coleman, Raymond Massey	Thriller	Warner Bros.
Dead Men Tell	Harry Lachman	Sidney Toler, Sheila Ryan, Kay Aldridge	Mystery	20th Century Fox. Charlie Chan
The Deadly Game	Phil Rosen	Charles Farrell, June Lang, John Miljan	Thriller	Monogram
Death Valley Outlaws	George Sherman	Don "Red" Barry, Lynn Merrick, Milburn Stone	Western	Republic
Desert Bandit	George Sherman	Don "Red" Barry, Lynn Merrick, William Haade	Western	Republic
Design for Scandal	Norman Taurog	Rosalind Russell, Walter Pidgeon, Edward Arnold	Comedy	MGM
Desperate Cargo	William Beaudine	Ralph Byrd, Carol Hughes, Julie Duncan	Thriller	PRC
The Devil and Daniel Webster	William Dieterle	Edward Arnold, Walter Huston, James Craig	Fantasy	RKO
The Devil and Miss Jones	Sam Wood	Jean Arthur, Charles Coburn, Robert Cummings	Comedy	RKO
The Devil Commands	Edward Dmytryk	Boris Karloff, Amanda Duff, Richard Fiske	Horror	Columbia
The Devil Pays Off	John H. Auer	Osa Massen, J. Edward Bromberg, Margaret Tallichet	Drama	Republic
Dive Bomber	Michael Curtiz	Errol Flynn, Fred MacMurray, Alexis Smith	War drama	Warner Bros.
Doctors Don't Tell	Jacques Tourneur	Florence Rice, John Beal, Edward Norris	Mystery	Republic
Doomed Caravan	Lesley Selander	William Boyd, Andy Clyde, Russell Hayden	Western	Paramount
Double Cross	Albert H. Kelley	Kane Richmond, Wynne Gibson, Pauline Moore	Crime	PRC
Double Date	Glenn Tryon	Edmund Lowe, Una Merkel, Peggy Moran	Comedy	Universal
Double Trouble	William Beaudine	Harry Langdon, Cathy Lewis, Charley Rogers	Comedy	Monogram
Down in San Diego	Robert B. Sinclair	Bonita Granville, Dan Dailey, Ray McDonald	Comedy	MGM
Down Mexico Way	Joseph Santley	Gene Autry, Fay McKenzie, Harold Huber	Western	Republic
Dr. Jekyll and Mr. Hyde	Victor Fleming	Spencer Tracy, Ingrid Bergman, Lana Turner	Horror	MGM. Based on Robert Louis Stevenson novel; remake of 1931 film
Dr. Kildare's Wedding Day	Harold S. Bucquet	Lew Ayres, Laraine Day, Red Skelton	Drama	MGM
Dressed to Kill	Eugene Forde	Lloyd Nolan, Mary Beth Hughes, Sheila Ryan	Mystery	20th Century Fox
The Driftin' Kid	Robert Emmett Tansey	Tom Keene, Betty Miles, Glenn Strange	Western	Monogram
Dude Cowboy	David Howard	Tim Holt, Marjorie Reynolds, Ray Whitley	Western	RKO
Dumbo	Ben Sharpsteen	Edward Brophy, Herman Bing, Cliff Edwards	Animated	Disney; won Oscar for Musical Score
Dynamite Canyon	Robert Emmett Tansey	Tom Keene, Sugar Dawn, Evelyn Finley	Western	Monogram

== E–F ==
Title	Director	Cast	Genre	Notes
Ellery Queen and the Murder Ring	James P. Hogan	Ralph Bellamy, Margaret Lindsay, Mona Barrie	Mystery	Columbia
Ellery Queen and the Perfect Crime	James P. Hogan	Ralph Bellamy, Margaret Lindsay, H. B. Warner	Mystery	Columbia
Ellery Queen's Penthouse Mystery	James P. Hogan	Ralph Bellamy, Margaret Lindsay, Anna May Wong	Mystery	Columbia
Emergency Landing	William Beaudine	Forrest Tucker, Carol Hughes, Evelyn Brent	Action	PRC
Escort Girl	Edward E. Kaye	Betty Compson, Margaret Marquis, Robert Kellard	Crime	Independent
The Face Behind the Mask	Robert Florey	Peter Lorre, Evelyn Keyes, George E. Stone	Horror	Columbia
Father Takes a Wife	Jack Hively	Adolphe Menjou, Gloria Swanson, Desi Arnaz	Comedy	RKO
Father's Son	D. Ross Lederman	John Litel, Frieda Inescort, Christian Rub	Drama	Warner Bros.
Father Steps Out	Jean Yarbrough	Frank Albertson, Lorna Gray, Jed Prouty	Comedy	Monogram
Federal Fugitives	William Beaudine	Neil Hamilton, Victor Varconi, George Carleton	Thriller	PRC
The Feminine Touch	W. S. Van Dyke	Rosalind Russell, Don Ameche, Kay Francis	Romantic comedy	MGM
Fiesta	LeRoy Prinz	Ann Ayars, Armida, Antonio Moreno	Musical	United Artists
Fighting Bill Fargo	Ray Taylor	Johnny Mack Brown, Fuzzy Knight, Jean Brooks	Western	Universal
The Flame of New Orleans	René Clair	Marlene Dietrich, Mischa Auer, Roland Young	Romantic comedy	Universal
Flight from Destiny	Vincent Sherman	Geraldine Fitzgerald, Jeffrey Lynn, Thomas Mitchell	Drama	Warner Bros.
Flying Blind	Frank McDonald	Jean Parker, Richard Arlen, Nils Asther	Drama	Paramount
Flying Cadets	Erle C. Kenton	William Gargan, Edmund Lowe, Peggy Moran	Adventure	Universal
Flying Wild	William Beaudine	Leo Gorcey, David Gorcey, Joan Barclay	Aviation	Monogram. Fifth in East Side Kids series
Footlight Fever	Irving Reis	Alan Mowbray, Donald MacBride, Elyse Knox	Comedy	RKO
Footsteps in the Dark	Lloyd Bacon	Errol Flynn, Brenda Marshall, Ralph Bellamy	Mystery	Warner Bros.
For Beauty's Sake	Shepard Traube	Marjorie Weaver, Ned Sparks Joan Davis	Comedy	20th Century Fox
Forbidden Trails	Robert N. Bradbury	Buck Jones, Tim McCoy, Raymond Hatton	Western	Monogram
Forced Landing	Gordon Wiles	Richard Arlen, Eva Gabor, J. Carrol Naish	Action	Paramount
Four Mothers	William Keighley	Priscilla Lane, Rosemary Lane, Lola Lane	Drama	Warner Bros.
Free and Easy	George Sidney	Robert Cummings, Ruth Hussey, Judith Anderson	Comedy	MGM
Fugitive Valley	S. Roy Luby	Ray Corrigan, Max Terhune, Julie Duncan	Western	Monogram

== G–H ==
Title	Director	Cast	Genre	Notes
Gambling Daughters	Max Nosseck	Cecilia Parker, Gale Storm, Roger Pryor	Mystery	PRC
Gangs of Sonora	John English	Robert Livingston, Bob Steele, Rufe Davis	Western	Republic
The Gang's All Here	Jean Yarbrough	Frankie Darro, Mantan Moreland, Robert Homans	Action comedy	Monogram
Gauchos of El Dorado	Lester Orlebeck	Bob Steele, Tom Tyler, Rufe Davis	Western	Republic
The Gay Falcon	Irving Reis	George Sanders, Wendy Barrie, Allen Jenkins	Mystery	RKO
The Gay Vagabond	William Morgan	Roscoe Karns, Ruth Donnelly, Margaret Hamilton	Comedy	Republic
Gentleman from Dixie	Albert Herman	Jack La Rue, Marian Marsh, Clarence Muse	Drama	Monogram
The Get-Away	Edward Buzzell	Robert Sterling, Donna Reed, Charles Winninger	Crime	MGM
A Girl, a Guy and a Gob	Richard Wallace	Lucille Ball, George Murphy, Edmond O'Brien	Comedy	RKO
Glamour Boy	Ralph Murphy	Jackie Cooper, Susanna Foster, Walter Abel	Comedy	Paramount
Golden Hoofs	Lynn Shores	Jane Withers, Buddy Rogers, Kay Aldridge	Comedy	20th Century Fox
Go West, Young Lady	Frank R. Strayer	Ann Miller, Glenn Ford, Ann Miller	Western comedy	Columbia
Great Guns	Monty Banks	Laurel and Hardy, Sheila Ryan, Mae Marsh	Comedy	20th Century Fox
The Great American Broadcast	Archie Mayo	Alice Faye, John Payne, Jack Oakie	Comedy	20th Century Fox
The Great Awakening	Reinhold Schünzel	Ilona Massey, Alan Curtis, Binnie Barnes	Drama	United Artists
The Great Lie	Edmund Goulding	Mary Astor, Bette Davis, George Brent	Drama	Warner Bros.; based on novel The Far Horizon; Academy Award for Astor
The Great Mr. Nobody	Benjamin Stoloff	Eddie Albert, Joan Leslie, John Litel	Comedy	Warner Bros.
The Great Swindle	Lewis D. Collins	Jack Holt, Marjorie Reynolds, Henry Kolker	Mystery	Columbia
The Great Train Robbery	Joseph Kane	Bob Steele, Claire Carleton, Milburn Stone	Western	Republic
The Gunman from Bodie	Spencer Gordon Bennet	Buck Jones, Tim McCoy, Raymond Hatton	Western	Monogram
H. M. Pulham, Esq.	King Vidor	Robert Young, Hedy Lamarr, Ruth Hussey	Drama	MGM.
Hands Across the Rockies	Lambert Hillyer	Wild Bill Elliott, Dub Taylor, Kenneth MacDonald	Western	Columbia
The Hard-Boiled Canary	Andrew L. Stone	Susanna Foster, Allan Jones, Margaret Lindsay	Comedy	Paramount
Hard Guy	Elmer Clifton	Jack LaRue, Mary Healy, Iris Adrian	Crime	PRC
Harmon of Michigan	Charles Barton	Tom Harmon, Anita Louise, Larry Parks	Sports	Columbia
Harvard, Here I Come	Lew Landers	Maxie Rosenbloom, Arline Judge, Marie Wilson	Comedy	Columbia
Hello, Sucker	Edward F. Cline	Hugh Herbert, Peggy Moran, June Storey	Comedy	Universal
Hellzapoppin'	H. C. Potter	Ole Olsen, Chic Johnson, Martha Raye	Musical comedy	Universal; based on stage musical
Henry Aldrich for President	Hugh Bennett	Jimmy Lydon, Mary Anderson, June Preisser	Comedy	Paramount
Here Comes Happiness	Noel M. Smith	Mildred Coles, Edward Norris, Richard Ainley	Comedy	Warner Bros.
Here Comes Mr. Jordan	Alexander Hall	Robert Montgomery, Evelyn Keyes, Claude Rains	Comedy	Columbia; 7 Oscar nominations, 2 wins; prequel to Down to Earth (1947)
Her First Beau	Theodore Reed	Jane Withers, Jackie Cooper, Josephine Hutchinson	Comedy drama	Columbia
High Sierra	Raoul Walsh	Ida Lupino, Humphrey Bogart, Joan Leslie	Film noir	Warner Bros.; remade as I Died a Thousand Times (1955)
Highway West	William C. McGann	Brenda Marshall, Arthur Kennedy, William Lundigan	Crime	Warner Bros.
Hit the Road	Joe May	Gladys George, Barton MacLane, Dead End Kids	Crime Comedy	Universal
Hold Back the Dawn	Mitchell Leisen	Charles Boyer, Olivia de Havilland, Paulette Goddard	Romance	Paramount
Hold That Ghost	Arthur Lubin	Abbott and Costello, Richard Carlson, Joan Davis	Comedy	Universal
Honeymoon for Three	Lloyd Bacon	Ann Sheridan, George Brent, Jane Wyman	Comedy	Warner Bros.
Honky Tonk	Jack Conway	Clark Gable, Lana Turner, Claire Trevor	Western	MGM
Honolulu Lu	Charles Barton	Lupe Vélez, Bruce Bennett, Leo Carrillo	Comedy	Columbia
Horror Island	George Waggner	Dick Foran, Peggy Moran, Leo Carrillo	Thriller	Universal
How Green Was My Valley	John Ford	Walter Pidgeon, Maureen O'Hara, Roddy McDowall	Drama	20th Century Fox; nominated for 10 Academy Awards, won 5, including Best Picture
Hudson's Bay	Irving Pichel	Paul Muni, Gene Tierney, Virginia Field	Historical	20th Century Fox
Hurricane Smith	Bernard Vorhaus	Ray Middleton, Jane Wyatt, Harry Davenport	Action	Republic
Hurry, Charlie, Hurry	Charles E. Roberts	Leon Errol, Mildred Coles, Cecil Cunningham	Comedy	RKO

== I–J ==
Title	Director	Cast	Genre	Notes
I Killed That Man	Phil Rosen	Ricardo Cortez, Joan Woodbury, Iris Adrian	Mystery	Monogram
I Wake Up Screaming	H. Bruce Humberstone	Betty Grable, Victor Mature, Carole Landis	Film noir	20th Century Fox
I Wanted Wings	Mitchell Leisen	Ray Milland, William Holden, Brian Donlevy	Drama	Paramount
I Was a Prisoner on Devil's Island	Lew Landers	Sally Eilers, Donald Woods, Eduardo Ciannelli	Crime	Columbia
Ice-Capades	Joseph Santley	James Ellison, Phil Silvers, Barbara Jo Allen	Comedy	Republic
I'll Sell My Life	Elmer Clifton	Rose Hobart, Michael Whalen, Joan Woodbury	Crime	Independent
I'll Wait for You	Robert B. Sinclair	Robert Sterling, Marsha Hunt, Carol Hughes	Drama	MGM
In Old Cheyenne	Joseph Kane	Roy Rogers, Joan Woodbury, George "Gabby" Hayes	Western	Republic
In Old Colorado	Howard Bretherton	William Boyd, Russell Hayden, Margaret Hayes	Western	Paramount
In the Navy	Arthur Lubin	Abbott and Costello, Dick Powell, Claire Dodd	Comedy	Universal
International Lady	Tim Whelan	George Brent, Ilona Massey, Basil Rathbone	Spy thriller	United Artists
International Squadron	Lewis Seiler, Lothar Mendes	Ronald Reagan, Olympe Bradna, James Stephenson	War	Warner Bros.
Invisible Ghost	Joseph H. Lewis	Bela Lugosi, Polly Ann Young, John McGuire	Horror	Monogram
It Started with Eve	Henry Koster	Deanna Durbin, Charles Laughton, Robert Cummings	Musical	Universal
Jesse James at Bay	Joseph Kane	Roy Rogers, Sally Payne, George "Gabby" Hayes	Western	Republic
Johnny Eager	Mervyn LeRoy	Robert Taylor, Lana Turner, Edward Arnold	Film noir	MGM
Jungle Man	Harry L. Fraser	Buster Crabbe, Sheila Darcy, Charles Middleton	Adventure	PRC

== K–L ==
Title	Director	Cast	Genre	Notes
Kansas Cyclone	George Sherman	Don "Red" Barry, Lynn Merrick, Dorothy Sebastian	Western	Republic
Kathleen	Harold S. Bucquet	Shirley Temple, Gail Patrick, Laraine Day	Drama	MGM
Keep 'Em Flying	Arthur Lubin	Abbott and Costello, Martha Raye, Carol Bruce	Comedy	Universal
The Kid from Kansas	William Nigh	Leo Carrillo, Andy Devine, Ann Doran	Action	Universal
The Kid's Last Ride	S. Roy Luby	Ray Corrigan, Max Terhune, Luana Walters	Western	Monogram
King of Dodge City	Lambert Hillyer	Wild Bill Elliott, Tex Ritter, Dub Taylor	Western	Columbia
King of the Zombies	Jean Yarbrough	Dick Purcell, Joan Woodbury, Henry Victor	Horror comedy	Monogram
Kiss the Boys Goodbye	Victor Schertzinger	Mary Martin, Don Ameche, Virginia Dale	Comedy	Paramount
Kisses for Breakfast	Lewis Seiler	Jane Wyatt, Shirley Ross, Dennis Morgan	Comedy	Warner Bros.
Knockout	William Clemens	Arthur Kennedy, Olympe Bradna, Virginia Field	Drama	Warner Bros.
Ladies in Retirement	Charles Vidor	Ida Lupino, Louis Hayward, Evelyn Keyes	Drama	Columbia
Lady Be Good	Norman Z. McLeod	Eleanor Powell, Ann Sothern, Robert Young	Musical	MGM
The Lady Eve	Preston Sturges	Barbara Stanwyck, Henry Fonda, Eugene Pallette	Screwball comedy	Paramount
The Lady from Cheyenne	Frank Lloyd	Loretta Young, Robert Preston Edward Arnold	Western	Universal
Lady from Louisiana	Bernard Vorhaus	John Wayne, Ona Munson, Henry Stephenson	Drama	Republic
Lady Scarface	Frank Woodruff	Dennis O'Keefe, Mildred Coles, Judith Anderson	Crime	RKO
Last of the Duanes	James Tinling	George Montgomery, Eve Arden, Lynne Roberts	Western	20th Century Fox
Las Vegas Nights	Ralph Murphy	Bert Wheeler, Constance Moore, Tommy Dorsey	Musical	Paramount
Law of the Range	Ray Taylor	Johnny Mack Brown, Nell O'Day, Fuzzy Knight	Western	Universal
Law of the Timber	Bernard B. Ray	Marjorie Reynolds, Monte Blue, J. Farrell MacDonald	Crime	PRC
Law of the Tropics	Ray Enright	Constance Bennett, Jeffrey Lynn, Mona Maris	Drama	Warner Bros.
Let's Go Collegiate	Jean Yarbrough	Frankie Darro, Marcia Mae Jones, Jackie Moran	Comedy	Monogram
Let's Make Music	Leslie Goodwins	Jean Rogers, Bob Crosby, Elisabeth Risdon	Musical	RKO
Life Begins for Andy Hardy	George B. Seitz	Lewis Stone, Mickey Rooney, Fay Holden	Family	MGM; 11th in series
Life with Henry	Theodore Reed	Jackie Cooper, Eddie Bracken, Leila Ernst	Comedy	Paramount
The Little Foxes	William Wyler	Bette Davis, Herbert Marshall, Teresa Wright	Drama	RKO; 8 Oscar nominations
The Lone Rider Ambushed	Sam Newfield	George Houston, Al St. John, Frank Hagney	Western	PRC
The Lone Rider Fights Back	Sam Newfield	George Houston, Al St. John, Dorothy Short	Western	PRC
The Lone Rider in Frontier Fury	Sam Newfield	George Houston, Al St. John, Hillary Brooke	Western	PRC
The Lone Rider in Ghost Town	Sam Newfield	George Houston, Rebel Randall, Al St. John	Western	PRC
The Lone Rider Rides On	Sam Newfield	George Houston, Hillary Brooke, Al St. John	Western	PRC
Lone Star Law Men	Robert Emmett Tansey	Tom Keene, Betty Miles, Frank Yaconelli	Western	Monogram
The Lone Wolf Keeps a Date	Sidney Salkow	Warren William, Frances Robinson, Bruce Bennett	Mystery	Columbia
The Lone Wolf Takes a Chance	Sidney Salkow	Warren William, June Storey, Henry Wilcoxon	Mystery	Columbia
Look Who's Laughing	Allan Dwan	Edgar Bergen, Lucille Ball, Jim Jordan	Comedy	RKO
Louisiana Purchase	Irving Cummings	Bob Hope, Vera Zorina, Irène Bordoni	Comedy	Paramount
Love Crazy	Jack Cummings	William Powell, Myrna Loy, Gail Patrick	Romantic comedy	MGM
Lucky Devils	Lew Landers	Andy Devine, Richard Arlen, Janet Shaw	Mystery	Universal
Lydia	Julien Duvivier	Merle Oberon, Joseph Cotten, Edna May Oliver	Drama	United Artists

== M–N ==
Title	Director	Cast	Genre	Notes
The Mad Doctor	Tim Whelan	Basil Rathbone, Ellen Drew, Ralph Morgan	Horror	Paramount
The Maltese Falcon	John Huston	Humphrey Bogart, Mary Astor, Sydney Greenstreet	Mystery	Warner Bros.; based on novel by Dashiell Hammett
A Man Betrayed	John H. Auer	John Wayne, Frances Dee, Wallace Ford	Drama	Republic
Man Hunt	Fritz Lang	Walter Pidgeon, Joan Bennett, George Sanders	Thriller	20th Century Fox. remade as Rogue Male
Man at Large	Eugene Forde	George Reeves, Marjorie Weaver, Steven Geray	Mystery	20th Century Fox
Man from Montana	Ray Taylor	Johnny Mack Brown, Nell O'Day, Jean Brooks	Western	Universal
Man Made Monster	George Waggner	Lon Chaney Jr., Lionel Atwill, Anne Nagel	Horror	Universal
Manpower	Raoul Walsh	Edward G. Robinson, Marlene Dietrich, George Raft	Drama	Warner Bros.
The Man Who Lost Himself	Edward Ludwig	Brian Aherne, Kay Francis, Henry Stephenson	Drama	Universal
Married Bachelor	Edward Buzzell	Robert Young, Ruth Hussey, Felix Bressart	Romantic comedy	MGM
Marry the Boss's Daughter	Thornton Freeland	Brenda Joyce, Hardie Albright, Ludwig Stössel	Comedy	20th Century Fox
Maisie Was a Lady	Edwin L. Marin	Ann Sothern, Lew Ayres, Maureen O'Sullivan	Comedy	MGM
The Masked Rider	Ford Beebe	Johnny Mack Brown, Nell O'Day, Virginia Carroll	Western	Universal
The Medico of Painted Springs	Lambert Hillyer	Charles Starrett, Wheeler Oakman, Ben Taggart	Western	Columbia
Meet Boston Blackie	Robert Florey	Chester Morris, Rochelle Hudson, Richard Lane	Mystery	Columbia
Meet John Doe	Frank Capra	Gary Cooper, Barbara Stanwyck, Walter Brennan	Dramatic comedy	Warner Bros.
Meet the Chump	Edward F. Cline	Hugh Herbert, Jeanne Kelly, Anne Nagel	Comedy	Universal
Melody for Three	Erle C. Kenton	Jean Hersholt, Fay Wray, Astrid Allwyn	Drama	RKO. Dr. Christian series
Melody Lane	Charles Lamont	Leon Errol, Anne Gwynne, Robert Paige	Comedy	Universal
The Men in Her Life	Gregory Ratoff	Loretta Young, Conrad Veidt, Otto Kruger	Drama	Columbia
Men of Boys Town	Norman Taurog	Spencer Tracy, Mickey Rooney, Darryl Hickman	Drama	MGM
Men of the Timberland	John Rawlins	Richard Arlen, Andy Devine, Linda Hayes	Action	Universal
Mercy Island	William Morgan	Ray Middleton, Gloria Dickson, Otto Kruger	Drama	Republic
The Mexican Spitfire's Baby	Leslie Goodwins	Lupe Vélez, Leon Errol, ZaSu Pitts	Comedy	RKO. One of series
Million Dollar Baby	Curtis Bernhardt	Ronald Reagan, Priscilla Lane, Jeffrey Lynn	Comedy	Warner Bros.
The Miracle Kid	William Beaudine	Tom Neal, Carol Hughes, The Miracle Kid	Sports	PRC
Miss Polly	Fred Guiol	ZaSu Pitts, Slim Summerville, Brenda Forbes	Comedy	United Artists
A Missouri Outlaw	George Sherman	Don "Red" Barry, Lynn Merrick, Paul Fix	Western	Republic
Mob Town	William Nigh	Dick Foran, Anne Gwynne, Billy Halop	Comedy drama	Universal
Model Wife	Leigh Jason	Joan Blondell, Dick Powell, Charles Ruggles	Comedy	Universal
The Monster and the Girl	Stuart Heisler	Ellen Drew, Robert Paige, Paul Lukas	Horror	Paramount
Moonlight in Hawaii	Charles Lamont	Jane Frazee, Johnny Downs, Mischa Auer	Musical	Universal
Moon Over Her Shoulder	Alfred L. Werker	Lynn Bari, John Sutton, Dan Dailey	Comedy	20th Century Fox
Moon Over Miami	Walter Lang	Betty Grable, Don Ameche, Carole Landis	Romantic comedy	20th Century Fox
Mountain Moonlight	Nick Grinde	Betty Jane Rhodes, John Archer, Kane Richmond	Comedy	Republic
Mr. Celebrity	William Beaudine	Robert "Buzz" Henry, James Seay, William Halligan	Comedy	PRC
Mr. Bug Goes to Town	Dave Fleischer	Kenny Gardner Jack Mercer, Tedd Pierce	Animated	Paramount
Mr. Dynamite	John Rawlins	Lloyd Nolan, Irene Hervey, J. Carrol Naish	Thriller	Universal
Mr. & Mrs. Smith	Alfred Hitchcock	Carole Lombard, Robert Montgomery, Gene Raymond	Screwball comedy	RKO
Mr. District Attorney	William Morgan	Dennis O'Keefe, Florence Rice, Peter Lorre	Mystery	Republic
Mr. District Attorney in the Carter Case	Bernard Vorhaus	James Ellison, Virginia Gilmore, Franklin Pangborn	Mystery	Republic
Murder Among Friends	Ray McCarey	Marjorie Weaver, John Hubbard, Mona Barrie	Mystery	20th Century Fox
Murder by Invitation	Phil Rosen	Wallace Ford, Marian Marsh, Sarah Padden	Mystery	Monogram
Mutiny in the Arctic	John Rawlins	Richard Arlen, Andy Devine, Anne Nagel	Adventure	Universal
My Life with Caroline	Lewis Milestone	Ronald Colman, Anna Lee, Charles Winninger	Comedy	RKO
Mystery Ship	Lew Landers	Paul Kelly, Lola Lane, Larry Parks	Thriller	Columbia
Naval Academy	Erle C. Kenton	Freddie Bartholomew, Jimmy Lydon, Pierre Watkin	Drama	Columbia
Navy Blues	Lloyd Bacon	Ann Sheridan, Martha Raye, Jack Oakie	Musical comedy	Warner Bros.
Nevada City	Joseph Kane	Roy Rogers, Sally Payne, George "Gabby" Hayes	Western	Republic
Never Give a Sucker an Even Break	Edward Cline	W. C. Fields, Gloria Jean, Mona Barrie	Comedy	Universal
New York Town	Charles Vidor	Fred MacMurray, Mary Martin, Robert Preston	Romantic comedy	Paramount
Niagara Falls	Gordon Douglas	Marjorie Woodworth, Tom Brown, ZaSu Pitts	Comedy	United Artists
Nice Girl?	William A. Seiter	Deanna Durbin, Franchot Tone, Walter Brennan	Musical	Universal
The Night of January 16th	William Clemens	Robert Preston, Ellen Drew, Nils Asther	Crime	Paramount
Nine Lives Are Not Enough	A. Edward Sutherland	Ronald Reagan, Joan Perry, Faye Emerson	Drama	Warner Bros.
No Greater Sin	William Nigh	Leon Ames, Luana Walters, Pamela Blake	Drama	Independent
No Hands on the Clock	Frank McDonald	Jean Parker, Chester Morris, Dick Purcell	Crime	Paramount
North from the Lone Star	Lambert Hillyer	Wild Bill Elliott, Richard Fiske, Dorothy Fay	Western	Columbia
Nothing But the Truth	Elliott Nugent	Bob Hope, Paulette Goddard, Edward Arnold	Comedy	Paramount
The Nurse's Secret	Noel M. Smith	Lee Patrick, Julie Bishop, Regis Toomey	Mystery	Warner Bros.

== O–P ==
Title	Director	Cast	Genre	Notes
The Officer and the Lady	Sam White	Rochelle Hudson, Bruce Bennett, Roger Pryor	Drama	Columbia
One Foot in Heaven	Irving Rapper	Fredric March, Martha Scott, Gene Lockhart	Biography	Warner Bros.
One Night in Lisbon	Edward H. Griffith	Fred MacMurray, Madeleine Carroll, Patricia Morison	Thriller	Paramount
Our Wife	John M. Stahl	Melvyn Douglas, Ruth Hussey, Ellen Drew	Comedy	Columbia
Out of the Fog	Anatole Litvak	Ida Lupino, John Garfield, Eddie Albert	Drama	Warner Bros.
Outlaws of Cherokee Trail	Lester Orlebeck	Robert Livingston, Bob Steele, Rufe Davis	Western	Republic
Outlaws of the Desert	Howard Bretherton	William Boyd, Andy Clyde, Duncan Renaldo	Western	Paramount
Outlaws of the Panhandle	Sam Nelson	Charles Starrett, Frances Robinson, Ray Teal	Western	Columbia
Outlaws of the Rio Grande	Sam Newfield	Tim McCoy, Rex Lease, Charles King	Western	PRC
Pacific Blackout	Ralph Murphy	Robert Preston, Martha O'Driscoll, Eva Gabor	Mystery	Paramount
Pals of the Pecos	Lester Orlebeck	Robert Livingston, Bob Steele, Rufe Davis	Western	Republic
Paper Bullets	Phil Rosen	Joan Woodbury, Jack La Rue, Alan Ladd	Crime	PRC
Parachute Battalion	Leslie Goodwins	Robert Preston, Nancy Kelly, Edmond O'Brien	War	RKO
Paris Calling	Edwin L. Marin	Elisabeth Bergner, Randolph Scott, Basil Rathbone	Film noir	Universal
The Parson of Panamint	William C. McGann	Charlie Ruggles, Ellen Drew, Phillip Terry	Western	Paramount
Passage from Hong Kong	D. Ross Lederman	Lucile Fairbanks, Paul Cavanagh, Richard Ainley	Mystery	Warner Bros.
The Penalty	Harold S. Bucquet	Lionel Barrymore, Edward Arnold, Marsha Hunt	Crime drama	MGM
Penny Serenade	George Stevens	Irene Dunne, Cary Grant, Beulah Bondi	Drama	Columbia; Oscar nomination for Grant
The People vs. Dr. Kildare	Harold S. Bucquet	Lew Ayres, Laraine Day, Bonita Granville	Drama	MGM
The Perfect Snob	Ray McCarey	Lynn Bari, Cornel Wilde, Charles Ruggles	Comedy	20th Century Fox
Petticoat Politics	Erle C. Kenton	Ruth Donnelly, Roscoe Karns, Polly Moran	Comedy	Republic
The Phantom Cowboy	George Sherman	Don "Red" Barry, Virginia Carroll, Milburn Stone	Western	Republic
The Pinto Kid	Lambert Hillyer	Charles Starrett, Louise Currie, Bob Nolan	Western	Columbia
The Pioneers	Albert Herman	Tex Ritter, Wanda McKay, Red Foley	Western	Monogram
Pirates on Horseback	Lesley Selander	William Boyd, Russell Hayden, Eleanor Stewart	Western	Paramount
The Pittsburgh Kid	Jack Townley	Billy Conn, Jean Parker, Veda Ann Borg	Sports	Republic
Play Girl	Frank Woodruff	Kay Francis, Mildred Coles, Nigel Bruce	Comedy	RKO
Playmates	David Butler	John Barrymore, Kay Kyser, Lupe Vélez	Comedy	RKO
Pot o' Gold	George Marshall	James Stewart, Paulette Goddard, Charles Winninger	Comedy	United Artists
Power Dive	James P. Hogan	Richard Arlen, Jean Parker, Helen Mack	War	Paramount
Prairie Pioneers	Lester Orlebeck	Robert Livingston, Bob Steele, Rufe Davis	Western	Republic
Prairie Stranger	Lambert Hillyer	Charles Starrett, Cliff Edwards, Patti McCarty	Western	Columbia
Private Nurse	David Burton	Brenda Joyce, Jane Darwell, Sheldon Leonard	Drama	20th Century Fox
Public Enemies	Albert S. Rogell	Wendy Barrie, Phillip Terry, Edgar Kennedy	Comedy	Republic
Puddin' Head	Joseph Santley	Judy Canova, Francis Lederer, Raymond Walburn	Comedy	Republic

== R–S ==
Title	Director	Cast	Genre	Notes
Rage in Heaven	W. S. Van Dyke	Robert Montgomery, Ingrid Bergman, George Sanders	Thriller	MGM
Rags to Riches	Joseph Kane	Alan Baxter, Mary Carlisle, Jerome Cowan	Crime	Republic
Raiders of the Desert	John Rawlins	Andy Devine, Richard Arlen, Maria Montez	Adventure	Universal
Rawhide Rangers	Ray Taylor	Johnny Mack Brown, Fuzzy Knight, Nell O'Day	Western	Universal
Reaching for the Sun	William A. Wellman	Joel McCrea, Ellen Drew, Eddie Bracken	Comedy	Paramount
Red River Valley	Joseph Kane	Roy Rogers, Gabby Hayes, Sally Payne	Western	Republic
Redhead	Edward L. Cahn	Johnny Downs, June Lang, Eric Blore	Comedy	Monogram
Reg'lar Fellers	Arthur Dreifuss	Billy Lee, Sarah Padden, Roscoe Ates	Comedy	PRC
The Reluctant Dragon	Alfred L. Werker	Robert Benchley, Frances Gifford, Nana Bryant	Family	Disney
Remember the Day	Henry King	Claudette Colbert, John Payne, Shepperd Strudwick	Drama	20th Century Fox
Repent at Leisure	Frank Woodruff	Kent Taylor, Wendy Barrie, Thurston Hall	Comedy	RKO
The Return of Daniel Boone	Lambert Hillyer	Wild Bill Elliott, Betty Miles, Carl Stockdale	Western	Columbia
The Richest Man in Town	Charles Barton	Frank Craven, Edgar Buchanan, Roger Pryor	Comedy	Columbia
Ride, Kelly, Ride	Norman Foster	Eugene Pallette, Marvin Stephens, Rita Quigley	Sports	20th Century Fox
Ride on Vaquero	Herbert I. Leeds	Cesar Romero, Mary Beth Hughes, Lynne Roberts	Western	20th Century Fox
Riders of the Badlands	Howard Bretherton	Charles Starrett, Russell Hayden, Cliff Edwards	Western	Columbia
Riders of the Purple Sage	James Tinling	George Montgomery, Mary Howard, Lynne Roberts	Western	20th Century Fox
Riders of the Timberline	Lesley Selander	William Boyd, Andy Clyde, Eleanor Stewart	Western	Paramount
Ridin' on a Rainbow	Lew Landers	Gene Autry, Mary Lee, Carol Adams	Western	Republic
Ridin' the Cherokee Trail	Spencer Gordon Bennet	Tex Ritter, Betty Miles, Forrest Taylor	Western	Monogram
Riding the Sunset Trail	Robert Emmett Tansey	Tom Keene, Betty Miles, Frank Yaconelli	Western	Monogram
Ringside Maisie	Edwin L. Marin	Ann Sothern, George Murphy, Robert Sterling	Comedy	MGM
Riot Squad	Edward Finney	Richard Cromwell, Rita Quigley, John Miljan	Crime	Monogram
Rise and Shine	Allan Dwan	Jack Oakie, Linda Darnell, George Murphy	Crime comedy	20th Century Fox
Road Agent	Charles Lamont	Dick Foran, Leo Carrillo, Andy Devine	Western	Universal
Road Show	Hal Roach	Carole Landis, Adolphe Menjou, John Hubbard	Drama	United Artists
Road to Zanzibar	Victor Schertzinger	Bob Hope, Bing Crosby, Dorothy Lamour	Comedy	Paramount; second in Road series
Roar of the Press	Phil Rosen	Jean Parker, Wallace Ford, Suzanne Kaaren	Mystery	Monogram
Roaring Frontiers	Lambert Hillyer	Tex Ritter, Bill Elliott, Ruth Ford	Western	Columbia
Robbers of the Range	Edward Killy	Tim Holt, Virginia Vale, Emmett Lynn	Western	RKO
Robin Hood of the Pecos	Joseph Kane	Roy Rogers, Marjorie Reynolds, George "Gabby" Hayes	Western	Republic
Romance of the Rio Grande	Herbert I. Leeds	Cesar Romero, Patricia Morison, Lynne Roberts	Western	Paramount
Rookies on Parade	Joseph Santley	Bob Crosby, Ruth Terry, Marie Wilson	Musical	Republic
The Round Up	Lesley Selander	Richard Dix, Patricia Morison, Preston Foster	Western	Paramount
The Royal Mounted Patrol	Lambert Hillyer	Charles Starrett, Russell Hayden, Wanda McKay	Western	Columbia
Saddlemates	Lester Orlebeck	Robert Livingston, Bob Steele, Rufe Davis	Western	Republic
Saddle Mountain Roundup	S. Roy Luby	Ray Corrigan, Max Terhune, Jack Mulhall	Western	Monogram
Sailors on Leave	Albert S. Rogell	Shirley Ross, William Lundigan, Ruth Donnelly	Comedy	Republic
The Saint in Palm Springs	Jack Hively	George Sanders, Wendy Barrie, Linda Hayes	Mystery	RKO
San Antonio Rose	Charles Lamont	Jane Frazee, Eve Arden, Robert Paige	Musical	Universal
Scattergood Baines	Christy Cabanne	Guy Kibbee, Carol Hughes, John Archer	Comedy	RKO
Scattergood Meets Broadway	Christy Cabanne	Guy Kibbee, Mildred Coles, Joyce Compton	Comedy	RKO
Scattergood Pulls the Strings	Christy Cabanne	Guy Kibbee, Bobs Watson, Susan Peters	Comedy	RKO
Scotland Yard	Norman Foster	Nancy Kelly, Edmund Gwenn, Henry Wilcoxon	Crime	20th Century Fox
The Sea Wolf	Michael Curtiz	Edward G. Robinson, Ida Lupino, John Garfield	Adventure	Warner Bros.
Secret Evidence	William Nigh	Marjorie Reynolds, Charles Quigley, Kenneth Harlan	Drama	PRC
Secret of the Wastelands	Derwin Abrahams	William Boyd, Andy Clyde, Barbara Britton	Western	Paramount
Secrets of the Lone Wolf	Edward Dmytryk	Warren William, Ruth Ford, Eric Blore	Mystery	Columbia
Sergeant York	Howard Hawks	Gary Cooper, Walter Brennan, Joan Leslie	Biography	Warner Bros.;Oscar for Cooper; 10 nominations
Shadow of the Thin Man	W. S. Van Dyke	William Powell, Myrna Loy, Donna Reed	Mystery	MGM; 4th in series
Shadows on the Stairs	D. Ross Lederman	Frieda Inescort, Paul Cavanagh, Heather Angel	Mystery	Warner Bros.
The Shanghai Gesture	Josef von Sternberg	Gene Tierney, Walter Huston, Victor Mature	Thriller	United Artists
She Knew All the Answers	Richard Wallace	Joan Bennett, Franchot Tone, Eve Arden	Comedy	Columbia
The Shepherd of the Hills	Henry Hathaway	John Wayne, Betty Field, Harry Carey	Drama	Paramount
Sheriff of Tombstone	Joseph Kane	Roy Rogers, Elyse Knox, George "Gabby" Hayes	Western	Republic
Shining Victory	Irving Rapper	James Stephenson, Geraldine Fitzgerald, Donald Crisp	Drama	Warner Bros.
A Shot in the Dark	William C. McGann	William Lundigan, Nan Wynn, Ricardo Cortez	Drama	Warner Bros.
Sierra Sue	William Morgan	Gene Autry, Fay McKenzie, Smiley Burnette	Western	Republic
Sign of the Wolf	Howard Bretherton	Michael Whalen, Grace Bradley, Mantan Moreland	Adventure	Monogram
Silver Stallion	Edward Finney	David Sharpe, LeRoy Mason, Janet Waldo	Western	Monogram
Sing Another Chorus	Charles Lamont	Jane Frazee, Johnny Downs, Mischa Auer	Comedy	Universal
Sing for Your Supper	Charles Barton	Jinx Falkenburg, Charles "Buddy" Rogers, Eve Arden	Musical	Columbia
Singapore Woman	Jean Negulesco	Brenda Marshall, Virginia Field, David Bruce	Drama	Warner Bros.
The Singing Hill	Lew Landers	Gene Autry, Mary Lee, Virginia Dale	Western	Republic
Sis Hopkins	Joseph Santley	Judy Canova, Bob Crosby, Susan Hayward	Comedy	Republic
Six Gun Gold	David Howard	Tim Holt, Fern Emmett, Eddy Waller	Western	RKO
Six Lessons from Madame La Zonga	John Rawlins	Lupe Vélez, Leon Errol, Helen Parrish	Comedy	Universal
Skylark	Mark Sandrich	Claudette Colbert, Ray Milland, Brian Aherne	Comedy	Paramount
Sleepers West	Eugene Forde	Lloyd Nolan, Lynn Bari, Mary Beth Hughes	Mystery	20th Century Fox
The Smiling Ghost	Lewis Seiler	Alexis Smith, Wayne Morris, Brenda Marshall	Comedy	Warner Bros.
Smilin' Through	Frank Borzage	Jeanette MacDonald, Brian Aherne, Ian Hunter	Drama	MGM
So Ends Our Night	John Cromwell	Fredric March, Margaret Sullavan, Glenn Ford	Drama	United Artists
The Son of Davy Crockett	Lambert Hillyer	Wild Bill Elliott, Iris Meredith, Dub Taylor	Western	Columbia
South of Panama	Jean Yarbrough	Roger Pryor, Virginia Vale, Lionel Royce	Thriller	PRC
South of Tahiti	George Waggner	Maria Montez, Brian Donlevy, Broderick Crawford	Adventure	Universal
Spooks Run Wild	Phil Rosen	Bela Lugosi, Leo Gorcey, Huntz Hall, Bobby Jordan	Comedy	Columbia
Steel Against the Sky	A. Edward Sutherland	Alexis Smith, Lloyd Nolan, Gene Lockhart	Drama	Warner Bros.
Strange Alibi	D. Ross Lederman	Arthur Kennedy, Joan Perry, Jonathan Hale	Drama	Warner Bros.
The Strawberry Blonde	Raoul Walsh	James Cagney, Olivia de Havilland, Rita Hayworth	Comedy	Warner Bros.
Stick to Your Guns	Lesley Selander	William Boyd, Jennifer Holt, Andy Clyde	Western	Paramount
The Stork Pays Off	Lew Landers	Victor Jory, Rochelle Hudson, Maxie Rosenbloom	Comedy	Columbia
Sullivan's Travels	Preston Sturges	Joel McCrea, Veronica Lake, Robert Warwick	Comedy	Paramount; voted one of 100 top films
Sundown	Henry Hathaway	Gene Tierney, Bruce Cabot, George Sanders	War	United Artists
Sun Valley Serenade	H. Bruce Humberstone	Sonja Henie, Lynn Bari, John Payne	Musical	20th Century Fox
Sunny	Herbert Wilcox	Anna Neagle, Ray Bolger, Edward Everett Horton	Musical	RKO
Sunset in Wyoming	William Morgan	Gene Autry, Smiley Burnette, Maris Wrixon	Western	Republic
Suspicion	Alfred Hitchcock	Cary Grant, Joan Fontaine, Nigel Bruce	Thriller	RKO; Oscar for Fontaine
Swamp Water	Jean Renoir	Walter Brennan, Walter Huston, Anne Baxter	Drama	20th Century Fox
Swamp Woman	Elmer Clifton	Ann Corio, Jack La Rue, Ian MacDonald	Drama	PRC
Sweetheart of the Campus	Edward Dmytryk	Ruby Keeler, Ozzie Nelson, Harriet Hilliard	Musical	Columbia
Swing It Soldier	Harold Young	Ken Murray, Frances Langford, Elvia Allman	Musical	Universal

== T–U ==
Title	Director	Cast	Genre	Notes
Tall, Dark and Handsome	H. Bruce Humberstone	Cesar Romero, Virginia Gilmore, Milton Berle	Comedy	20th Century Fox
Tanks a Million	Fred Guiol	William Tracy, James Gleason, Elyse Knox	Comedy	United Artists
Tarzan's Secret Treasure	Richard Thorpe	Johnny Weissmuller, Maureen O'Sullivan, Johnny Sheffield	Adventure	MGM; fifth in series
Texas	George Marshall	William Holden, Glenn Ford, Claire Trevor	Western	Columbia
The Texas Marshal	Sam Newfield	Tim McCoy, Art Davis, Karl Hackett	Western	PRC
That Hamilton Woman	Alexander Korda	Vivien Leigh, Laurence Olivier, Alan Mowbray	Historical	United Artists
That Night in Rio	Irving Cummings	Don Ameche, Alice Faye, Carmen Miranda	Musical	20th Century Fox
That Uncertain Feeling	Ernst Lubitsch	Merle Oberon, Melvyn Douglas, Burgess Meredith	Comedy	United Artists
They Dare Not Love	James Whale	Martha Scott, George Brent, Paul Lukas	Drama	Columbia
They Died with Their Boots On	Raoul Walsh	Errol Flynn, Olivia de Havilland, Sydney Greenstreet	Western	Warner Bros.; story of General Custer
They Meet Again	Erle C. Kenton	Jean Hersholt Dorothy Lovett, Neil Hamilton	Drama	RKO
They Met in Argentina	Jack Hively	Maureen O'Hara, James Ellison, Diosa Costello	Drama	RKO
They Met in Bombay	Clarence Brown	Clark Gable, Rosalind Russell, Peter Lorre	Adventure	MGM
Thieves Fall Out	Ray Enright	Eddie Albert, Joan Leslie, Jane Darwell	Comedy	Warner Bros.
This Woman Is Mine	Frank Lloyd	Franchot Tone, Carol Bruce, Nigel Bruce	Adventure	Universal
Three Girls About Town	Leigh Jason	Joan Blondell, Janet Blair, Binnie Barnes	Comedy	Columbia
Three Sons o' Guns	Benjamin Stoloff	Marjorie Rambeau, Wayne Morris, Irene Rich	Comedy	Warner Bros.
Thunder Over the Prairie	Lambert Hillyer	Charles Starrett, Cliff Edwards, David Sharpe	Western	Columbia
Tight Shoes	Albert S. Rogell	John Howard, Binnie Barnes, Broderick Crawford	Comedy	Universal
Tillie the Toiler	Sidney Salkow	Kay Harris, William Tracy, Daphne Pollard	Comedy	Columbia
Time Out for Rhythm	Sidney Salkow	Rudy Vallée, Ann Miller, The Three Stooges	Musical comedy	Columbia
Tobacco Road	John Ford	Charley Grapewin, Dana Andrews, Gene Tierney	Drama	20th Century Fox; from novel by Erskine Caldwell
Tom, Dick and Harry	Garson Kanin	Ginger Rogers, George Murphy, Alan Marshal	Comedy	RKO
Tonto Basin Outlaws	S. Roy Luby	Ray Corrigan, Max Terhune, Jan Wiley	Western	Monogram
Too Many Blondes	Thornton Freeland	Rudy Vallée, Helen Parrish, Lon Chaney Jr.	Comedy	Universal
Top Sergeant Mulligan	Jean Yarbrough	Nat Pendleton, Carol Hughes, Marjorie Reynolds	Comedy	Monogram
Topper Returns	Roy Del Ruth	Joan Blondell, Roland Young, Carole Landis	Comedy	United Artists; second sequel to 1937 film
The Trial of Mary Dugan	Robert Z. Leonard	Laraine Day, Robert Young, Tom Conway	Drama	MGM
Tumbledown Ranch in Arizona	S. Roy Luby	Ray Corrigan, Max Terhune, Sheila Darcy	Western	Monogram
Tuxedo Junction	Frank McDonald	Sally Payne, Frankie Darro, Thurston Hall	Musical	Republic
Twilight on the Trail	Howard Bretherton	William Boyd, Wanda McKay, Andy Clyde	Western	Paramount
Two-Faced Woman	George Cukor	Greta Garbo, Melvyn Douglas, Constance Bennett	Romantic comedy	MGM
Two Gun Sheriff	George Sherman	Don "Red" Barry, Lynn Merrick, Lupita Tovar	Western	Republic
Two in a Taxi	Robert Florey	Anita Louise, Russell Hayden, Dick Purcell	Comedy	Columbia
Two Latins from Manhattan	Charles Barton	Joan Davis, Jinx Falkenburg, Joan Woodbury	Comedy	Columbia
Uncle Joe	William Strohbach	Gale Storm, ZaSu Pitts, Slim Summerville	Comedy	Monogram
Under Age	Edward Dmytryk	Nan Grey, Alan Baxter, Mary Anderson	Crime	Columbia
Under Fiesta Stars	Frank McDonald	Gene Autry, Smiley Burnette, Carol Hughes	Western	Republic
Underground	Vincent Sherman	Jeffrey Lynn, Philip Dorn, Kaaren Verne	War	Warner Bros.
Underground Rustlers	S. Roy Luby	Ray Corrigan, Max Terhune, Gwen Gaze	Western	Monogram
Unexpected Uncle	Peter Godfrey	Charles Coburn, James Craig, Anne Shirley	Comedy	RKO
Unfinished Business	Gregory La Cava	Irene Dunne, Robert Montgomery, Preston Foster	Comedy	Universal
Unholy Partners	Mervyn LeRoy	Edward G. Robinson, Laraine Day, Edward Arnold	Drama	MGM

== V–Z ==
Title	Director	Cast	Genre	Notes
A Very Young Lady	Harold D. Schuster	Jane Withers, Nancy Kelly, John Sutton	Comedy	20th Century Fox
Virginia	Edward H. Griffith	Madeleine Carroll, Fred MacMurray, Sterling Hayden	Drama	Paramount
The Wagons Roll at Night	Ray Enright	Humphrey Bogart, Eddie Albert, Joan Leslie, Sylvia Sidney	Drama	Warner Bros.
Wanderers of the West	Robert F. Hill	Tom Keene, Sugar Dawn, Betty Miles	Western	Monogram
Washington Melodrama	S. Sylvan Simon	Ann Rutherford, Frank Morgan, Dan Dailey	Drama	MGM
Week-End in Havana	Walter Lang	Alice Faye, Carmen Miranda, John Payne	Musical comedy	20th Century Fox
Weekend for Three	Irving Reis	Jane Wyatt, Dennis O'Keefe, Edward Everett Horton	Comedy	RKO
We Go Fast	William C. McGann	Alan Curtis, Lynn Bari, Sheila Ryan	Drama	20th Century Fox
West of Cimarron	Lester Orlebeck	Bob Steele, Tom Tyler, Rufe Davis	Western	Republic
West Point Widow	Robert Siodmak	Anne Shirley, Richard Carlson, Frances Gifford	Comedy	Paramount
Western Union	Fritz Lang	Randolph Scott, Robert Young, Virginia Gilmore	Western	20th Century Fox
When Ladies Meet	Robert Z. Leonard	Joan Crawford, Robert Taylor, Greer Garson	Romantic comedy	MGM
Where Did You Get That Girl?	Arthur Lubin	Leon Errol, Helen Parrish, Eddie Quillan	Musical comedy	Universal
Whistling in the Dark	S. Sylvan Simon	Red Skelton, Conrad Veidt, Ann Rutherford	Comedy	MGM
Wide Open Town	Lesley Selander	William Boyd, Russell Hayden, Evelyn Brent	Western	Paramount
Wild Geese Calling	John Brahm	Henry Fonda, Joan Bennett, Warren William	Drama	20th Century Fox
The Wild Man of Borneo	Robert B. Sinclair	Frank Morgan, Billie Burke, Bonita Granville	Comedy	MGM
The Wolf Man	George Waggner	Lon Chaney Jr., Claude Rains, Ralph Bellamy	Horror	Universal; 4 sequels for Chaney
A Woman's Face	George Cukor	Joan Crawford, Melvyn Douglas, Conrad Veidt	Drama	MGM
World Premiere	Ted Tetzlaff	John Barrymore, Frances Farmer, Eugene Pallette	Comedy	Paramount
Wrangler's Roost	S. Roy Luby	Ray Corrigan, Max Terhune, Gwen Gaze	Western	Monogram
Wyoming Wildcat	George Sherman	Don "Red" Barry, Julie Duncan, Syd Saylor	Western	Republic
A Yank in the R.A.F.	Henry King	Tyrone Power, Betty Grable, John Sutton	War	20th Century Fox
You Belong to Me	Wesley Ruggles	Barbara Stanwyck, Henry Fonda, Ruth Donnelly	Romantic comedy	Columbia
You'll Never Get Rich	Sidney Lanfield	Fred Astaire, Rita Hayworth, Robert Benchley	Musical comedy	Columbia
You're in the Army Now	Lewis Seiler	Jimmy Durante, Jane Wyman, Phil Silvers	Comedy	Warner Bros.
You're Out of Luck	Howard Bretherton	Frankie Darro, Kay Sutton, Mantan Moreland	Comedy	Monogram
You're the One	Ralph Murphy	Bonnie Baker, Orrin Tucker, Edward Everett Horton	Comedy	Paramount
Ziegfeld Girl	Robert Z. Leonard	James Stewart, Judy Garland, Hedy Lamarr, Lana Turner	Musical drama	MGM
Zis Boom Bah	William Nigh	Peter Lind Hayes, Mary Healy, Jan Wiley	Musical	Monogram

== Documentaries ==
Title	Director	Cast	Genre	Notes
A Place to Live	Irving Lerner		Documentary	
Ring of Steel		Narrated by Spencer Tracy		Army recruiting film

== Serials ==
Title	Director	Cast	Genre	Notes
Adventures of Captain Marvel	William Witney, John English	Tom Tyler, Frank Coghlan Jr., Louise Currie	Serial	Republic's first comic book adaptation
Dick Tracy vs Crime Inc	William Witney, John English	Ralph Byrd	Serial	Based on the comic strip
The Green Hornet Strikes Again	Ford Beebe, John Rawlins	Warren Hull, Keye Luke	Serial	Sequel to The Green Hornet (1940)
Jungle Girl	William Witney, John English	Frances Gifford	Serial	Republic
Jungle Man	Harry L. Fraser	Buster Crabbe, Sheila Darcy	Serial	
Riders of Death Valley	Ray Taylor	Dick Foran, Buck Jones, Ford Beebe	Serial	Universal
Sea Raiders	Ford Beebe	Dead End Kids, Little Tough Guys	Serial	
Sky Raiders	Ford Beebe	Donald Woods	Serial	
White Eagle	James W. Horne	Buck Jones, Dorothy Fay	Serial	

== Shorts ==
Title	Director	Cast	Genre	Notes
An Ache in Every Stake	Del Lord	The Three Stooges	Comedy short	
All the World's a Stooge	Del Lord	The Three Stooges	Comedy short	
All This and Rabbit Stew	Tex Avery	Bugs Bunny	Animation	Warner Bros.
The Art of Self Defense	Jack Kinney	Goofy	Animation	
Aviation Vacation	Tex Avery	Looney Tunes	Animation	
Chef Donald	Jack King	Donald Duck	Cartoon	
Dutiful But Dumb	Del Lord	The Three Stooges	Comedy Short	Columbia
Elmer's Pet Rabbit	Chuck Jones	Elmer Fudd, Bugs Bunny	Cartoon	Warner Bros.
Golden Eggs	Wilfred Jackson	Donald Duck	Cartoon	
The Heckling Hare	Tex Avery	Looney Tunes	Animation	
Hiawatha's Rabbit Hunt	Friz Freleng	Bugs Bunny	Animation	
I'll Never Heil Again	Jules White	The Three Stooges	Comedy Short	Columbia
In the Sweet Pie and Pie	Jules White	The Three Stooges	Comedy short	Columbia
The Little Whirlwind	Riley Thomson	Mickey Mouse	Animated Short	
The Midnight Snack	Hanna-Barbera		Animated short	Tom and Jerry
Moods of the Sea			Avant-garde Short	
The Nifty Nineties			Animated Short	
The Night Before Christmas	Hanna-Barbera		Animated Short	Tom and Jerry
Old MacDonald Duck	Jack King	Donald Duck	Cartoon	
Pantry Panic	Walter Lantz	Woody Woodpecker	Animated	Universal
Scrub Me Mama with a Boogie Beat	Walter Lantz		Animated short	7 minutes
So Long Mr. Chumps	Jules White	The Three Stooges	Comedy	Columbia
Some More of Samoa	Del Lord	The Three Stooges	Comedy	Columbia
Timber		Donald Duck, Peg Leg Pete	Animated Short	
Tortoise Beats Hare	Tex Avery	Bugs Bunny, Cecil Turtle	Animation	
Trail of the Silver Spurs	S. Roy Luby	Ray "Crash" Corrigan, Max Terhune, Dorothy Short	Western	Monogram
Wabbit Twouble		Bugs Bunny	Animation	

== See also ==
- 1941 in the United States
