= Walter Soderling =

American film, radio and stage actor

- Soderling in The Falcon in Hollywood, 1944
- Born: April 13, 1872; Milwaukee, Wisconsin, U.S.
- Died: April 10, 1948 (aged 75); Los Angeles, California, U.S.
- Education: Harvard University; Northwestern University; University of Chicago
- Occupations: Film, radio and stage actor

Walter Soderling (April 13, 1872 – April 10, 1948) was an American film, radio and stage actor. He was best known for playing Morgan in the Blondie film series.

== Life and career ==
Soderling was born in Milwaukee, Wisconsin. He attended Harvard University, Northwestern University and the University of Chicago. He began his stage career in 1907, appearing in the Broadway play My Wife. During his stage career, he appeared in the stage plays The Undercurrent, Judy Drops In, The Barber Had Two Sons, The Prodigal Husband and Much Ado About Nothing. During his stage career, he played Nels, the delighted dim-witted character in the radio program Mr. and Mrs. He then began his screen career in 1933, appearing in the short film Static. In 1936, he appeared in the film The Luckiest Girl in the World.

Later in his career, Soderling played Morgan in the Blondie films Blondie, Blondie Meets the Boss and Blondie Has Servant Trouble. In 1941, he starred as Mayor Elwell in the film The Return of Daniel Boone, starring along with Wild Bill Elliott, Betty Miles, Dub Taylor, Ray Bennett and Carl Stockdale. He appeared in numerous films such as Out West with the Peppers, The Gay Falcon Mr. Smith Goes to Washington, Zombies on Broadway, The Blocked Trail, The Face Behind the Mask, When the Daltons Rode, Confessions of Boston Blackie and Santa Fe Trail. He last appeared in the film Special Agent.

== Death ==
Soderling died on April 10, 1948, in Los Angeles, California, at the age of 75.
