= Wild Horse Stampede =

1943 film by Alan James

- Film poster
- Directed by: Alan James
- Screenplay by: Elizabeth Beecher (story); Frances Kavanaugh (screenplay)
- Produced by: Robert Emmett Tansey
- Starring: Ken Maynard; Hoot Gibson; Betty Miles
- Cinematography: Marcel Le Picard
- Edited by: Fred Bain
- Music by: Frank Sanucci
- Production company: Monogram Pictures
- Release date: April 16, 1943
- Running time: 59 minutes
- Country: United States
- Language: English

Wild Horse Stampede is a 1943 American Western film directed by Alan James and starring Ken Maynard and Hoot Gibson, who play marshals with their own names in the manner of Gene Autry and Roy Rogers. It was the first of eight Monogram Pictures "The Trail Blazers" film series, replacing the studio's Range Busters series.

== Plot ==
Cowboys Hoot Gibson and Ken Maynard try to help newly appointed sheriff Bob Tyler. The Army needs a herd of horses to help protect the new railroad line from Indian attacks, but bad guy and town boss Carson tries to stop the delivery. Gibson, Maynard, and Tyler must save the day.

== Cast ==
- Ken Maynard as U.S. Marshal Ken Maynard
- Hoot Gibson as U.S. Marshal Hoot Gibson
- Betty Miles as Betty Wallace
- Bob Baker as Marshal Bob Tyler
- Ian Keith as Carson
- Si Jenks as Rawhide
- Robert McKenzie as Puckett
- John Bridges as Colonel Black
- Kenneth Harlan as Borman
- I. Stanford Jolley as Commissioner Brent
- Forrest Taylor as Marshal Cliff Tyler
- Kenne Duncan as Hanley
- Glenn Strange as Henchman Tip
- Tom London as Henchman Westy
- Reed Howes as Henchman Tex
- Foxy Callahan as Henchman
- Chick Hannan as Bartender
- Tex Palmer as Henchman

== Production ==
With many actors called up for World War II, Monogram Pictures began a series starring two older but still popular Western stars, Hoot Gibson and Ken Maynard. Maynard recalled Monogram offered each of them $600 per film. When Maynard remarked to Gibson that the pair of them should lose some weight for the film, Gibson replied "For the kind of money we're gettin' I ain't missin' no desserts".
