= Riding the Sunset Trail =

1941 film by Robert Emmett Tansey

- Theatrical release poster
- Directed by: Robert Emmett Tansey
- Screenplay by: Robert Emmett Tansey; Frances Kavanaugh
- Produced by: Robert Emmett Tansey
- Starring: Tom Keene; Betty Miles; Frank Yaconelli; Sugar Dawn; Slim Andrews; Kenne Duncan
- Cinematography: Marcel Le Picard
- Edited by: Fred Bain
- Music by: Frank Sanucci
- Production company: Monogram Pictures
- Distributed by: Monogram Pictures
- Release date: October 31, 1941
- Running time: 56 minutes
- Country: United States
- Language: English

Riding the Sunset Trail is a 1941 American Western film directed by Robert Emmett Tansey and written by Robert Emmett Tansey and Frances Kavanaugh. The film stars Tom Keene, Betty Miles, Frank Yaconelli, Sugar Dawn, Slim Andrews and Kenne Duncan. The film was released on October 31, 1941, by Monogram Pictures.

== Cast ==
- Tom Keene as Tom Sterling
- Betty Miles as Betty Dawson
- Frank Yaconelli as Lopez Mendoza
- Sugar Dawn as Sugar Dawson
- Slim Andrews as Jasper Raines
- Kenne Duncan as Jay Lynch
- Fred Hoose as Judge Little
- Gene Alsace as Pecos Dean
- Tom Seidel as Bronco West
- Earl Douglas as Drifter Smith
- Tom London as Sheriff Hays
- James Sheridan as Rip Carson
- Jimmy Aubrey as Jim Dawson
