= Arizona Roundup =

1942 film

- Theatrical release poster
- Directed by: Robert Emmett Tansey
- Screenplay by: Robert Emmett Tansey; Frances Kavanaugh
- Produced by: Robert Emmett Tansey
- Starring: Tom Keene; Frank Yaconelli; Sugar Dawn; Jack Ingram; Hope Blackwood; Steve Clark
- Cinematography: Marcel Le Picard
- Edited by: Fred Bain
- Music by: Frank Sanucci
- Production company: Monogram Pictures
- Distributed by: Monogram Pictures
- Release date: March 6, 1942
- Running time: 56 minutes
- Country: United States
- Language: English

Arizona Roundup is a 1942 American Western film produced and directed by Robert Emmett Tansey who co-wrote the film with Frances Kavanaugh. The film stars Tom Keene, Frank Yaconelli, Sugar Dawn, Jack Ingram, Hope Blackwood in her only film and Steve Clark. The film was released on March 6, 1942, by Monogram Pictures.

== Plot ==
Tom Kenyon (Tom Keene) and his sidekick Pierre La Fair (Frank Yaconelli) are hired by rancher Mike O'Day and his daughter Sugar (Sugar Dawn) to deliver wild horses to the government's remount station. Ed Spencer and Ted Greenway form a combine that they plan to use to charge an exorbitant price to O'Day to get the horses shipped. Tom then discloses that he is a government agent and has a plan to beat their villainous scheme.

== Cast ==
- Tom Keene as Tom Kenyon
- Prince as Prince
- Frank Yaconelli as Pierre La Fair
- Sugar Dawn as Sugar O'Day
- Jack Ingram as Duke Carlton
- Hope Blackwood as Tony O'Day
- Steve Clark as Mike O'Day
- Tom Seidel as Hank Waters
- Nick Moro as Pancake
- Hal Price as Ted Greenway
- I. Stanford Jolley as Ed Spincer
- Fred Hoose as Mr. Holms
- James Sheridan as Kansas
- Gene Alsace as Rocky
- Steven Clensos as Buck
