= Pals of the Silver Sage =

- Theatrical release poster
- Directed by: Albert Herman
- Screenplay by: Robert Emmett Tansey
- Story by: George Victor Martin
- Produced by: Edward Finney
- Starring: Tex Ritter; Sugar Dawn; Slim Andrews; Clarene Curtis; Glenn Strange; Carleton Young
- Cinematography: Marcel Le Picard
- Edited by: Robert Golden
- Production company: Monogram Pictures
- Distributed by: Monogram Pictures
- Release date: April 22, 1940
- Running time: 52 minutes
- Country: United States
- Language: English

Pals of the Silver Sage is a 1940 American Western film directed by Albert Herman and written by Robert Emmett Tansey. The film stars Tex Ritter, Sugar Dawn, Slim Andrews, Clarene Curtis, Glenn Strange and Carleton Young. The film was released on April 22, 1940, by Monogram Pictures.

== Plot ==
Tex gets a job on Sugar Gray's ranch. He soon discovers how the brand on her cattle have been changed to that of Vic Insley's, then he gets the brands switched back, while resisting attempts on his life. Now he must find a way to get the cattle to market.

== Cast ==
- Tex Ritter as Tex Wright
- Sugar Dawn as Sugar Grey
- Slim Andrews as Cactus
- Clarene Curtis as Ruth Hill
- Glenn Strange as Vic Insley
- Carleton Young as Jeff Grey
- Joe McGuinn as Cowhide
- Chester Gan as Ling
- Warner Richmond as Sheriff
