= The Dude Wrangler =

1930 film

- Trade magazine ad
- Directed by: Richard Thorpe
- Written by: Robert N. Lee; Caroline Lockhart (novel)
- Produced by: Cliff P. Broughton
- Starring: Lina Basquette; Tom Keene; Clyde Cook
- Production company: K.B.S. Productions
- Distributed by: Sono Art-World Wide Pictures
- Release date: July 1, 1930
- Running time: 60 minutes
- Country: United States
- Language: English

The Dude Wrangler is a 1930 American pre-Code comedy Western film directed by Richard Thorpe and starring Lina Basquette, Tom Keene and Clyde Cook.

== Cast ==
- Lina Basquette as Helen Dane
- Tom Keene as Wally McCann (credited as George Duryea)
- Clyde Cook as Pinkey Fripp
- Francis X. Bushman as Canby
- Ethel Wales as Mattie
- Margaret Seddon as Aunt Mary
- Sôjin Kamiyama as Wong
- Wilfrid North as The 'Snorer'

== Bibliography ==
- Pitts, Michael R. Poverty Row Studios, 1929–1940: An Illustrated History of 55 Independent Film Companies, with a Filmography for Each. McFarland & Company, 2005.
