= The Sea Wolf (1941 film) =

1941 film by Michael Curtiz

- Theatrical release poster
- Directed by: Michael Curtiz
- Screenplay by: Robert Rossen
- Based on: The Sea-Wolf; 1904 novel by Jack London
- Produced by: Hal B. Wallis (executive); Henry Blanke (associate)
- Starring: Edward G. Robinson; Ida Lupino; John Garfield; Alexander Knox
- Cinematography: Sol Polito
- Edited by: George Amy
- Music by: Erich Wolfgang Korngold
- Production company: Warner Bros. Pictures
- Distributed by: Warner Bros. Pictures
- Release date: March 21, 1941
- Running time: 100 minutes (original cut); 86 minutes (re-release cut)
- Country: United States
- Language: English
- Budget: $1,013,217
- Box office: $1,881,000

The Sea Wolf is a 1941 American adventure drama film adaptation of Jack London's 1904 novel The Sea-Wolf with Edward G. Robinson, Ida Lupino, John Garfield, and Alexander Knox making his debut in an American film. The film was written by Robert Rossen and directed by Michael Curtiz.

The film was first premiered on board the S.S. America traveling from Los Angeles to San Francisco, its special group of passengers including many cast members. A private screening the following day—22 March—was presented at the California home of Jack London's widow, Charmain London.

Later it was screened at the 9th annual Turner Classic Movies Film Festival on April 26, 2018, in Los Angeles. The version of the film screened was the original theatrical cut that was reassembled after 35mm nitrate elements were discovered at the Museum of Modern Art. It included thirteen minutes of footage that were cut from the film in 1947 when it was re-released as a double-feature with the 1940 Errol Flynn vehicle with a similar name. The original cut of the film, digitally remastered and restored, was released through the Warner Archive Collection on DVD and Blu-ray on October 10, 2017.

== Plot ==
San Francisco 1900 : Fiction writer Humphrey Van Weyden and escaped convict Ruth Webster are passengers on a ferry that collides with another vessel and sinks. They are rescued from drowning by the Ghost, a seal-hunting ship. The Ghost's captain is Wolf Larsen, who delights in abusing his crew.

Larsen refuses to return to port early and forces Van Weyden to work in the kitchen under the supervision of "Cooky", the ship's cook. He also compels Van Weyden to spend time alone with him in his cabin, where the two discuss philosophy and the nature of humanity. Larsen asserts the Nietzschean proposition that man is essentially an amoral animal, and that morality is a construct that has no bearing on life onboard his ship. He predicts that Van Weyden's character will change as he accustoms himself to the uncivilized life among the crew, where no one has any value higher than his own personal gain.

When Dr. Prescott, the ship's drunken doctor, determines that the unconscious Webster needs a transfusion to survive, Larsen "volunteers" George Leach, even though there is no way to test if his blood is compatible. The blood ends up being compatible, and Ruth Webster recovers. She comes to depend on Leach for protection. Larsen humiliates Prescott, who retaliates by revealing to the crew that Larsen's own brother, Death, another sea captain, is hunting him, having vowed to kill him; Prescott then commits suicide.

Fear of being hunted drives some members of the crew to mutiny, led by George Leach. They ambush Larsen and throw him and his first mate overboard. However, Larsen manages to grab a trailing rope, climb back aboard, and put down the mutiny. He announces that an informant revealed to him who the conspirators were. However, instead of punishing them, he betrays the informant, Cooky. They punish Cooky by dropping him into the water, dragging him behind the ship as he holds onto a rope for dear life. This is at first intended as a practical joke; however, a shark bites off one of Cooky's legs. The crewmen pull him and his life is saved.

Eventually, Leach, Webster, Van Weyden, and a crewman, Johnson, escape on a dory. However, they discover that Larsen replaced their water supply with vinegar. Later, while the others sleep, Johnson sacrifices himself by going overboard to help conserve the little water they have.

Larsen suffers from intense headaches that leave him temporarily blind, but hides his condition from the crew, knowing that he will eventually lose his sight permanently. When Larsen's brother catches up with him, the Ghost is attacked by cannon and, after several hits, begins to sink. The Ghost escapes into a fog bank, but Larsen is blind again and his debility is revealed to all. Thus, the crew seizes this opportunity to abandon ship by taking to the lifeboats and will leave Larsen aboard by himself.

Van Weyden, Leach, and Webster sight the outline of a ship through the fog, but realize that it is the Ghost and, having no other choice, reboard it. The ship appears to be deserted, George Leach goes below for provisions. He is ambushed by Wolf Larsen, who locks him in a storage compartment. Larsen is determined to go down with the Ghost and take as many others with him as he can. Van Weyden tries to get the key from Larsen and is fatally shot, but manages to hide the fact from the now near completely blind captain. He tricks Larsen into giving Webster the key by promising to stay with Larsen to the bitter end. This act of seeming self-sacrifice disturbs Larsen, causing him to question his whole philosophy, until he realizes that Van Weyden is dying from his bullet wound. Vindicated in his own mind, Larsen awaits his demise. Leach and Webster reboard the dory and sail toward a nearby island.

== Cast ==
- Edward G. Robinson as Wolf Larsen
- Ida Lupino as Ruth Webster
- John Garfield as George Leach
- Alexander Knox as Humphrey Van Weyden
- Gene Lockhart as Louis J. Prescott
- Barry Fitzgerald as Cooky
- Stanley Ridges as Johnson
- David Bruce as Young Sailor
- Francis McDonald as Svenson
- Howard Da Silva as Harrison
- Frank Lackteen as Smoke
- Ethan Laidlaw as Crewman (uncredited)

== Production ==
Robert Rossen's re-draft of the script may be the greatest influence on the film. While the tyrannical captain remained both victim and oppressed in a capitalist hierarchy, he became a symbol of fascism. Rossen also split the novel's idealistic hero into an intellectual dishwasher and a rebellious seaman and gave the seaman a love interest, played by Lupino. Rossen added scenes for this pair, partly urged by Lupino. However, Warner Bros. Pictures cut many political items during production.

George Raft backed out of the role of Leach just as filming was about to begin, after five days of negotiation over the changes he wanted. He was put on suspension. In its Nov. 4, 1940 article, The New York Times did not report details of the failed negotiations. Filmink magazine later said "as if that mattered with Michael Curtiz directing, and Edward G Robinson starring from a Jack London novel."

The eerie atmosphere was heightened by the studio's newly installed fog-making machine in the largest soundstage that could accommodate full-scale ship deck sets.

The Sea Wolf has several connections to the city of London, Ontario, aside from the source author's surname. Studio executive Jack L. Warner and cast member Gene Lockhart were both born in the city and cast member Knox attended university there. For these reasons, the film's Canadian premiere was held at London's Capitol Theatre.

== Reception ==
Bosley Crowther gave the film a mixed review in The New York Times on March 22, 1941: “…We don't recall that (Larsen) has ever been presented with such scrupulous psychological respect… (but) the drive of the drama is impaired, for precious time is wasted [talking] when bloody business on deck might be occupying the screen, …When topside, however, it rolls along ruthlessly…” Crowther expressed “emphatic criticism” on two points, “the representation of a crude blood transfusion at sea is not only implausible but completely anachronistic. And, in the second place, we dislike sea-pictures photographed in a tank, where the water laps as in a bathtub and the fog rolls like a steam-room mist. At least a good half of the effect in a sea-picture comes from the sea, and when that element is lacking the whole thing seems flat and synthetic. This, we regret to say, is a major fault in "The Sea Wolf."

On March 23, 1941, in a feature headlined “Another Hardy Perennial Blooms,” The New York Times compared the many different film versions of the novel.

On Rotten Tomatoes, the film has a rare but perfect 100% fresh rating, based on 8 contemporary and today's reviews.

According to Warner Bros figures, the film earned $1,237,000 domestically and $644,000 foreign.

== Awards ==
The film was nominated for the Oscar for Best Special Effects (Byron Haskin, Nathan Levinson) at the 14th Academy Awards.

== Radio adaptation ==
The Sea Wolf was presented on Screen Directors Playhouse on February 3, 1950, with Robinson re-creating his role from the film.

== See also ==
- List of American films of 1941
