= Gunning for Justice =

1948 film directed by Ray Taylor

- Theatrical release poster
- Directed by: Ray Taylor
- Screenplay by: J. Benton Cheney
- Produced by: Barney Sarecky
- Starring: Johnny Mack Brown; Raymond Hatton; Max Terhune; Evelyn Finley; I. Stanford Jolley; House Peters Jr.
- Cinematography: Harry Neumann
- Edited by: John C. Fuller
- Production company: Monogram Pictures
- Distributed by: Monogram Pictures
- Release date: November 7, 1948
- Running time: 55 minutes
- Country: United States
- Language: English

Gunning for Justice is a 1948 American Western film directed by Ray Taylor and written by J. Benton Cheney. The film stars Johnny Mack Brown, Raymond Hatton, Max Terhune, Evelyn Finley, I. Stanford Jolley and House Peters Jr. The film was released on November 7, 1948 by Monogram Pictures.

== Cast ==
- Johnny Mack Brown as Johnny Mack
- Raymond Hatton as Banty
- Max Terhune as Alibi Parsons
- Evelyn Finley as Winnie Stewart
- I. Stanford Jolley as Blake
- House Peters Jr. as Kirk Wheeler
- Ted Adams as Lem Tolliver
- Bud Osborne as The Cook
- Dan White as Sheriff
- Bob Woodward as Jarvis
- Carol Henry as Petrie
- Boyd Stockman as Smoky
- Dee Cooper as Luke
- Bill Potter as Potter
