= Wanderers of the West =

1941 film

- Theatrical release poster
- Directed by: Robert F. Hill
- Screenplay by: Robert Emmett Tansey
- Produced by: Robert Emmett Tansey
- Starring: Tom Keene; Sugar Dawn; Slim Andrews; Betty Miles; Tom Seidel; Stanley Price
- Cinematography: Jack Young
- Edited by: Fred Bain
- Production company: Monogram Pictures
- Distributed by: Monogram Pictures
- Release date: July 25, 1941
- Running time: 58 minutes
- Country: United States
- Language: English

Wanderers of the West is a 1941 American Western film directed by Robert F. Hill and written by Robert Emmett Tansey. The film stars Tom Keene, Sugar Dawn, Slim Andrews, Betty Miles, Tom Seidel and Stanley Price. The film was released on July 25, 1941, by Monogram Pictures.

== Cast ==
- Tom Keene as Tom Mallory / The Arizona Kid
- Sugar Dawn as Sugar Dean
- Slim Andrews as Slim
- Betty Miles as Laura Lee
- Tom Seidel as Waco Dean / Rusty Mack
- Stanley Price as Jack Benson
- Gene Alsace as Bronco
- Tom London as Sheriff
- James Sherridan as Jeff Haines
- Fred Hoose as Bartender
