= Dynamite Canyon =

1941 film

- Theatrical release poster
- Directed by: Robert Emmett Tansey
- Screenplay by: Robert Emmett Tansey; Frances Kavanaugh
- Produced by: Robert Emmett Tansey
- Starring: Tom Keene; Sugar Dawn; Slim Andrews; Evelyn Finley; Stanley Price; Kenne Duncan
- Cinematography: Jack Young
- Edited by: Fred Bain
- Production company: Monogram Pictures
- Distributed by: Monogram Pictures
- Release date: August 8, 1941
- Running time: 58 minutes
- Country: United States
- Language: English

Dynamite Canyon is a 1941 American Western film directed by Robert Emmett Tansey and written by Robert Emmett Tansey and Frances Kavanaugh. The film stars Tom Keene, Sugar Dawn, Slim Andrews, Evelyn Finley, Stanley Price and Kenne Duncan. The film was released on August 8, 1941, by Monogram Pictures.

== Cast ==
- Tom Keene as Tom Evans / Ed 'Trigger' Jones
- Sugar Dawn as Sugar Gray
- Slim Andrews as Slim
- Evelyn Finley as Midge Reed
- Stanley Price as Duke Rand
- Kenne Duncan as Rod
- Gene Alsace as Regan
- Tom London as Captain Gray
- Fred Hoose as Colonel Blake
- Rusty the Horse as Rusty
