= Ghost Guns =

1944 film directed by Lambert Hillyer

- Directed by: Lambert Hillyer
- Written by: Frank H. Young; Bennett Cohen
- Produced by: Charles J. Bigelow
- Starring: Johnny Mack Brown; Raymond Hatton; Evelyn Finley
- Cinematography: Marcel Le Picard
- Edited by: Pierre Janet
- Music by: Edward J. Kay
- Production company: Monogram Pictures
- Distributed by: Monogram Pictures
- Release date: November 17, 1944
- Running time: 60 minutes
- Country: United States
- Language: English

Ghost Guns is a 1944 American Western film directed by Lambert Hillyer. This is the thirteenth film in the "Marshal Nevada Jack McKenzie" series, and stars Johnny Mack Brown as Jack McKenzie and Raymond Hatton as his sidekick Sandy Hopkins, with Evelyn Finley, Riley Hill and Ernie Adams.

== Cast ==
- Johnny Mack Brown as Marshal Nevada Jack McKenzie
- Raymond Hatton as Marshal Sandy Hopkins
- Evelyn Finley as Ann Jordan
- Riley Hill as Ted Connors
- Ernie Adams as Doc Edwards
- Sarah Padden as Aunt Sally
- Jack Ingram as Waco - Henchman
- Tom Quinn as Stringer - Henchman
- Frank LaRue as Judge Kelbro
- John Merton as Matson
- Steve Clark as Steve
- Marshall Reed as Blackjack - Henchman
- George Morrell as Station Agent

== Bibliography ==
- Martin, Len D. The Allied Artists Checklist: The Feature Films and Short Subjects of Allied Artists Pictures Corporation, 1947-1978. McFarland & Company, 1993.
