= Lone Star Law Men =

1941 film by Robert Emmett Tansey

- Theatrical release poster
- Directed by: Robert Emmett Tansey
- Screenplay by: Robert Emmett Tansey; Frances Kavanaugh
- Produced by: Robert Emmett Tansey
- Starring: Tom Keene; Frank Yaconelli; Betty Miles; Sugar Dawn; Gene Alsace; Glenn Strange
- Cinematography: Robert E. Cline
- Edited by: Fred Bain
- Production company: Monogram Pictures
- Distributed by: Monogram Pictures
- Release date: December 5, 1941
- Running time: 58 minutes
- Country: United States
- Language: English

Lone Star Law Men is a 1941 American Western film directed by Robert Emmett Tansey and written by Robert Emmett Tansey and Frances Kavanaugh. The film stars Tom Keene, Frank Yaconelli, Betty Miles, Sugar Dawn, Gene Alsace and Glenn Strange. The film was released on December 5, 1941, by Monogram Pictures.

== Cast ==
- Tom Keene as Tom Sterling
- Frank Yaconelli as Lopez Mendoza
- Betty Miles as Betty Grey
- Sugar Dawn as Sugar Grey
- Gene Alsace as Marshal Brady
- Glenn Strange as Marshal Scott
- Charles King as Duke Lawson
- Fred Hoose as Marshal James
- Stanley Price as Moose Mason
- James Sheridan as Red
- Reed Howes as Ace
