= The Sheriff of Medicine Bow =

1948 film directed by Lambert Hillyer

- Theatrical release poster
- Directed by: Lambert Hillyer
- Screenplay by: J. Benton Cheney
- Produced by: Barney Sarecky
- Starring: Johnny Mack Brown; Raymond Hatton; Max Terhune; Evelyn Finley; Bill Kennedy; George J. Lewis
- Cinematography: Harry Neumann
- Edited by: Carl Pierson
- Production company: Monogram Pictures
- Distributed by: Monogram Pictures
- Release date: October 3, 1948
- Running time: 55 minutes
- Country: United States
- Language: English

The Sheriff of Medicine Bow is a 1948 American Western film directed by Lambert Hillyer and written by J. Benton Cheney. The film stars Johnny Mack Brown, Raymond Hatton, Max Terhune, Evelyn Finley, Bill Kennedy and George J. Lewis. The film was released on October 3, 1948, by Monogram Pictures.

== Cast ==
- Johnny Mack Brown as Johnny Mack Brown
- Raymond Hatton as Banty Prentiss
- Max Terhune as Alibi
- Evelyn Finley as Nan Prentiss
- Bill Kennedy as Barry Stuart
- George J. Lewis as Buckeye
- Frank LaRue as Jim Carson
- Peter Perkins as Pardo
- Carol Henry as Grogan
- Bob Woodward as Duke
