= Arizona Frontier =

1940 film

- Theatrical release poster
- Directed by: Albert Herman
- Screenplay by: Robert Emmett Tansey
- Produced by: Edward Finney
- Starring: Tex Ritter; Slim Andrews; Evelyn Finley; Frank LaRue; Tris Coffin; Gene Alsace
- Cinematography: Marcel Le Picard
- Edited by: Fred Bain
- Production company: Monogram Pictures
- Distributed by: Monogram Pictures
- Release date: August 19, 1940
- Running time: 60 minutes
- Country: United States
- Language: English

Arizona Frontier is a 1940 American Western film directed by Albert Herman and written by Robert Emmett Tansey. The film stars Tex Ritter, Slim Andrews, Evelyn Finley, Frank LaRue, Tris Coffin and Gene Alsace. The film was released on August 19, 1940, by Monogram Pictures.

== Cast ==
- Tex Ritter as Tex Whitedeer
- Slim Andrews as Slim Chance
- Evelyn Finley as Honey Lane
- Frank LaRue as Captain Farley
- Tris Coffin as Lt. James
- Gene Alsace as Bisbee
- Richard Cramer as Graham
- James Pierce as Kansas
- Jim Thorpe as Gray Cloud
- Hal Price as Joe Lane
- James Sheridan as Henchman
- Chick Hannan as Henchman
- Art Wilcox as Art Wilcox
