= Evelyn Finley =

American actress (1916–1989)

- Born: March 11, 1916; Douglas, Arizona. U.S.
- Died: April 7, 1989 (aged 73); Big Bear City, California, U.S.
- Occupations: Film actress, stuntwoman
- Years active: 1936–1985
- Spouse: Lee Roberts

Evelyn Finley (March 11, 1916 – April 7, 1989) was an American B-movie actress and stuntwoman of the 1940s through the 1980s, mostly in western films. Sometimes she is credited as Eve Anderson.

== Biography ==
Born in Douglas, Arizona, Finley, an accomplished equestrian, started off as a stuntwoman in the 1936 film The Texas Rangers, playing the stunt double to actress Jean Parker, then later in the 1939 film The Light That Failed. She began acting in the early 1940s, on contract with Monogram Pictures, often starring opposite Tom Keene and Tex Ritter. Her first acting film role was alongside Ritter, in Arizona Frontier, released in 1940. In 1942 she starred opposite Max Terhune and Dave Sharpe in Trail Riders, and in 1943 she again starred alongside Max Terhune, with Ray "Crash" Corrigan, in Cowboy Commandos.

Through the remainder of the 1940s and well into the 1950s, she starred and performed stunts in numerous films, most notably Ghost Guns in 1944 and Sundown Riders in 1948. In Ghost Guns, she starred in the lead role, and also performed her own stunts, a regular event throughout her early career, and she received high praise for her riding stunts in that movie.

She has often been called one of the greatest horseback riders in film history, joining the company of Nell O'Day and Betty Miles. Despite her age, she continued to work in the stunt business, either as an advisor or as an actual stunt performer, into the mid-1980s. Her last film in which she worked as a stunt technical advisor was the 1985 film Silverado, starring Kevin Costner and Scott Glenn. She died of heart failure on April 7, 1989, in Big Bear City, California, at the age of 73.

== Filmography ==
- Arizona Frontier (1940)
- Dynamite Canyon (1941)
- Trail Riders (1942)
- Black Market Rustlers (1943)
- Cowboy Commandos (1943)
- Ghost Guns (1944)
- Valley of Vengeance (1944)
- Prairie Rustlers (1945)
- The Sheriff of Medicine Bow (1948)
- Gunning for Justice (1948)
- Perils of the Wilderness (1956)
