= Sheila Darcy =

American actress (1914–2004)

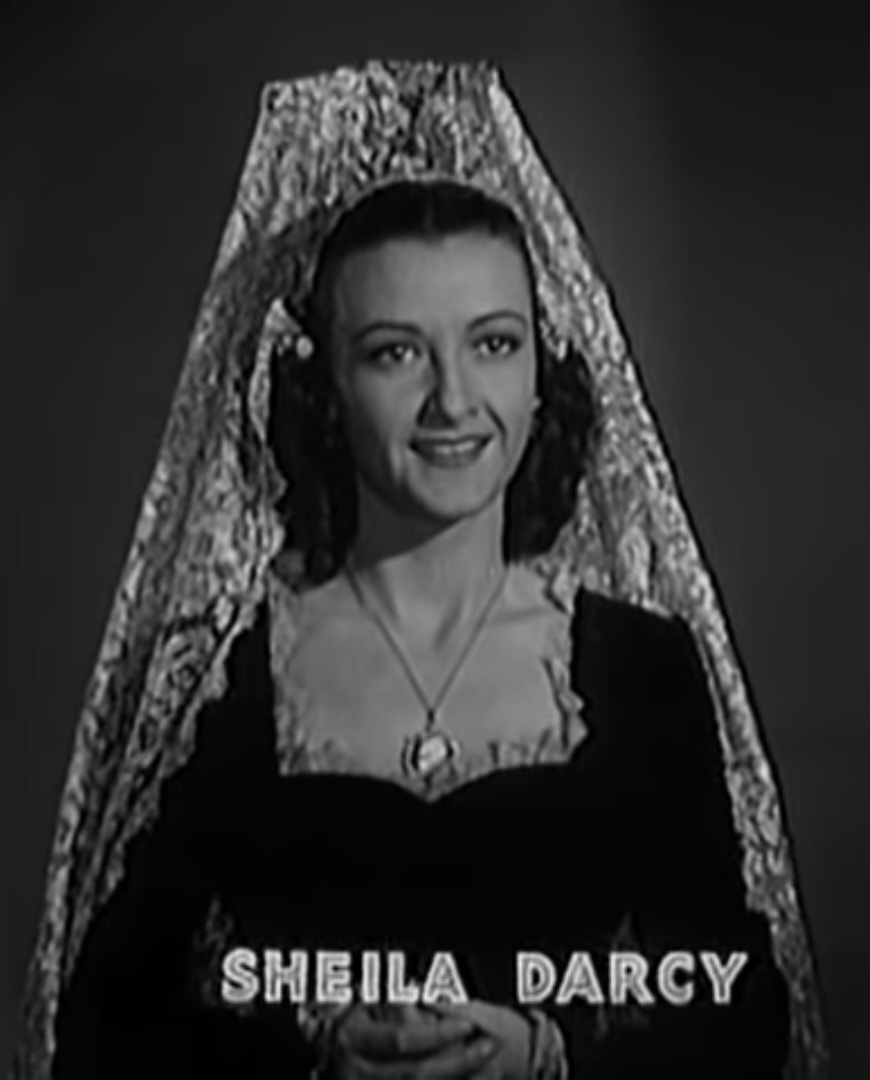
- Darcy in Zorro's Fighting Legion (1939)
- Born: Rebecca Benedict Heffener; August 8, 1914; York, Pennsylvania, U.S.
- Died: February 24, 2004 (aged 89); Kearny Mesa, California, U.S.
- Other names: Rebecca Wassem
- Occupation: Actress
- Years active: 1932–1951
- Spouses: Erich von Stroheim Jr. (1946-?); Preston Foster (m. 1946; died 1970)

Sheila Darcy (born Rebecca Benedict Heffener; August 8, 1914 – February 24, 2004), also known as "Rebecca Wassem", was an American film actress of the 1930s and the 1940s.

== Biography ==
Born Rebecca Benedict Heffener in York, Pennsylvania, Darcy moved to Hollywood when she was 18 to pursue a career in acting. She began her career using the name Rebecca Wassem and received her first role, uncredited, in the 1932 film Jewel Robbery. Two years later she received more roles, starring in two films that year. By 1935 her career had taken off, and from then until 1941 she had roles in 41 films. In most of her early films, she played the heroine in B-movies, often Westerns.

Darcy's best known roles were as the female lead in cliffhangers, such as the 1939 film Zorro's Fighting Legion, in which she performed opposite Reed Hadley. She also played the Dragon Lady in the serial Terry and the Pirates, released in 1940. In Westerns, she often played opposite popular cowboy actors Ray "Crash" Corrigan and Max Terhune. In 1941 she starred or co-starred in six films and had uncredited appearances in two others. Her Hollywood career effectively ended following the release of Jungle Man in 1941, although a decade later she did have a bit part in one other film, Tomahawk.

In 1943, Darcy was "a teacher of a new method for strengthening weak eyes."

Darcy married Erich von Stroheim Jr. on May 27, 1943, in Hollywood. She also was married to actor Preston Foster, and they remained together until his death in 1970. She died at age 89 on February 24, 2004, in Kearny Mesa, California.

== Partial filmography ==
- Illegal Traffic (1938)
- The Man in the Iron Mask (1939)
- Irish Luck (1939)
- Zorro's Fighting Legion (1939)
- Terry and the Pirates (1940)
- Jungle Man (1941)
- Tumbledown Ranch in Arizona (1941)
- Dangerous Lady (1941)
- Tomahawk (1951)
