= Desperate Cargo =

1941 film by William Beaudine

- Theatrical film poster
- Directed by: William Beaudine
- Written by: Morgan Cox (screenplay); John T. Coyle (screenplay)
- Based on: story "Loot Below" by Eustace L. Adams
- Produced by: John T. Coyle
- Starring: Ralph Byrd; Julie Duncan; Carol Hughes
- Cinematography: Jack Greenhalgh
- Edited by: Guy V. Thayer Jr.
- Music by: Whitey Jowett
- Production company: Producers Releasing Corporation
- Distributed by: Producers Releasing Corporation
- Release date: 4 July 1941
- Running time: 67 minutes 71 minutes (Ontario, Canada)
- Country: United States
- Language: English

Desperate Cargo is a 1941 American crime drama film directed by William Beaudine and starring Ralph Byrd, Carol Hughes, Julie Duncan and Jack Mulhall. It was made by the low-budget independent Producers Releasing Corporation. It is based on the 1937 Argosy magazine serial Loot Below by Eustace Lane Adams.

== Plot ==
On the Caribbean island of Puerto Nueva, a disparate group of individuals await a Boeing 314 Clipper, the Caribbean Clipper that will take them to Miami. Tony Bronson is the new purser for the flight who disrupts the robbery of New York journalist Jim Halsey at their hotel.

Halsey is a passenger on the same flight, flying to the U.S. to begin an assignment for his newspaper that will ultimately have him stationed in the Orient. Having some money left, Halsey arranges a double date for Tony with two entertainers in a sister act, Ann Howard and Peggy Morton. The women have learned that their show in New York has been canceled and are stranded in Puerto Nueva without the fare to leave. Ann tries to manipulate Tony into arranging free passage for them on the Clipper. Tony falls in love with Ann and Jim proposes to Peggy.

Among the other passengers are Madden, Ryan, Desser and Professor Carter, their ringleader and a former pilot who flew Clippers for the airline. Their plan is to hijack the aircraft in mid-air, rob the passengers and steal a shipment of $500,000 from the plane's safe. Carter will then land in a remote area of the Caribbean Sea, where the gang and their loot will be collected.

When they take over the aircraft by killing the navigator and copilot, Carter locks the passengers in their quarters and the crew in the cargo compartment. After landing, although the gang has the money stolen from their captives, the safe is locked and only Tony can open it. Ryan is ordered to force the purser to open the safe, but in a struggle for Ryan's gun, Tony shoots him and escapes, jumping from the aircraft. Swimming over to the cargo hold, he frees pilot Hank MacFarland and the rest of the crew, then returns to the cockpit where Carter threatens to burn the Clipper. Tony overpowers him, and holding the rest of the gang at gunpoint, he allows MacFarland to regain control of the aircraft. Jim and Tony are finally reunited with their sweethearts as the Clipper heads to Miami, where the police are waiting to apprehend the gang.

== Cast ==
- Ralph Byrd as Tony Bronson
- Julie Duncan as Ann Howard
- Carol Hughes as Peggy Morton
- Jack Mulhall as Jim Halsey
- I. Stanford Jolley as "Professor" Carter
- Kenneth Harlan as Capt. Hank MacFarland
- Richard Clarke as Henchman Ryan
- Johnstone White as Madden, a valet/henchman
- Paul Bryar as Henchman Desser
- Thornton Edwards as Manuelo
- Don Forrest as Navigator Williams
- Loretta Russell as Mrs. Pettingill, a passenger
- Rick Vallin as Radioman Stevens
- Harry Depp as Crouse, a small passenger

== Production ==
A Boeing 314 Clipper is prominently featured in Desperate Cargo, but only in stock footage.

Principal photography for the film, with a working title of Dangerous Cargo, took place from mid to late May 1941. Although the film is set aboard a Boeing 314 Clipper, nearly all of the shots are interior views filmed on a soundstage.

== Reception ==
In a modern-day review, writer Catherine Yronwode found many redeeming characteristics in the film, including the casting of a number of interesting actors, such as silent screen stars Kenneth Harlan as the airliner pilot and Jack Mulhall as the second male lead. She wrote: "All in all, this was a great little movie of its type. Sure, it could have been better – a shorter set-up and more tension in the final scenes, a staccato musical score to heighten the drama, a cuter and more compliant lead actress – but it is certainly worth a viewing."
