= Wyoming Wildcat =

1941 film by George Sherman

- Directed by: George Sherman
- Screenplay by: Bennett Cohen; Anthony Coldeway
- Story by: Bennett Cohen
- Produced by: George Sherman
- Starring: Don "Red" Barry; Julie Duncan; Frank M. Thomas; Syd Saylor; Dick Botiller; Edmund Cobb
- Cinematography: William Nobles
- Edited by: Lester Orlebeck
- Music by: Cy Feuer; William Lava
- Production company: Republic Pictures
- Distributed by: Republic Pictures
- Release date: January 6, 1941
- Running time: 56 minutes
- Country: United States
- Language: English

Wyoming Wildcat is a 1941 American Western film directed by George Sherman and written by Bennett Cohen and Anthony Coldeway. The film stars Don "Red" Barry, Julie Duncan, Frank M. Thomas, Syd Saylor, Dick Botiller and Edmund Cobb. The film was released on January 6, 1941, by Republic Pictures.

== Plot ==
Soldier Bill Gannon returns to Wyoming, after being released from service in the Spanish–American War. However, when he gets there, he discovers that his father has turned into an outlaw, due to the dishonesty and bad faith of others. His father still cares for him and does not want him to be involved in the bandit life; so, he pushes his son away. Bill moves somewhere else and gets a job, as a guard on a stagecoach route. Too bad it's the stagecoach his father's gang was about to steal.

== Cast ==
- Don "Red" Barry as Bill Gannon
- Julie Duncan as Terrie Carson
- Frank M. Thomas as Frank Gannon
- Syd Saylor as Butch McCord
- Dick Botiller as Blackie Jordan
- Edmund Cobb as Duke Edwards / Sam Collins
- Ed Brady as Timmons
- Ed Cassidy as Sheriff #2
- George Sherwood as Jackson

== Bibliography ==
- Fetrow, Alan G. Feature Films, 1940-1949: a United States Filmography. McFarland, 1994.
