= The Return of Daniel Boone =

1941 film by Lambert Hillyer

- Theatrical release poster
- Directed by: Lambert Hillyer
- Screenplay by: Paul Franklin; Joseph Hoffman
- Story by: Paul Franklin
- Produced by: Leon Barsha
- Starring: Wild Bill Elliott; Betty Miles; Dub Taylor; Ray Bennett; Walter Soderling; Carl Stockdale
- Cinematography: Philip Tannura
- Edited by: Mel Thorsen
- Production company: Columbia Pictures
- Distributed by: Columbia Pictures
- Release date: May 7, 1941
- Running time: 60 minutes
- Country: United States
- Language: English

The Return of Daniel Boone is a 1941 American Western film directed by Lambert Hillyer and written by Paul Franklin and Joseph Hoffman. The film stars Wild Bill Elliott, Betty Miles, Dub Taylor, Ray Bennett, Walter Soderling and Carl Stockdale. The film was released on May 7, 1941, by Columbia Pictures.

== Plot ==
Leach Killgrain conspires with the mayor to create conditions where all the ranchers in the county would have no option but to sell their land. He plans to buy all that land cheaply. But some individuals stand up to him and try to expose Killgrain's scheme.

== Cast ==
- Wild Bill Elliott as Wild Bill Boone
- Betty Miles as Ellen Brandon
- Dub Taylor as Cannonball
- Ray Bennett as Leach Killgrain
- Walter Soderling as Mayor Elwell
- Carl Stockdale as Jeb Brandon
- Bud Osborne as Red
- Francis Walker as Bowers
- Lee Powell as Tax Collector Fuller
- Tom Carter as Wagner
- Edmund Cobb as Henderson
- Verda Rodik as Melinda
- Verna Rodik as Matilda
