= Jungle Man (film) =

1941 film by Harry L. Fraser

- Original film poster
- Directed by: Harry L. Fraser
- Written by: Rita Douglas (story and screenplay)
- Produced by: Mervyn Freeman (associate producer); Ted Richmond (producer); George R. Batcheller Jr.
- Starring: Buster Crabbe; Charles B. Middleton; Sheila Darcy
- Cinematography: Mervyn Freeman; Jack Greenhalgh
- Edited by: Holbrook N. Todd
- Music by: Alberto Colombo
- Production company: Producers Releasing Corporation
- Distributed by: Producers Releasing Corporation
- Release date: 19 September 1941 (premiere)
- Running time: 63 minutes
- Country: United States
- Language: English

Jungle Man is a 1941 American adventure film directed by Harry L. Fraser and starring Buster Crabbe in his first of many films for Producers Releasing Corporation. He is reunited with Charles B. Middleton from the Flash Gordon serials. Cinematographer and associate producer Mervyn Freeman (1890–1965) was an experienced newsreel cameraman.

== Plot summary ==
Bruce Kellogg and his friend Alex are off to Africa on an expedition to the "City of the Dead" that is actually footage of Angkor Wat. Bruce's fiancée Betty and her father decide to go along to visit her father's brother James who is a missionary in the same part of Africa. Arriving at the Rev Graham's home they meet Dr Hammond who has spent five years developing a serum to a deadly fever that rages in the area. The results of his work are placed on a freighter to America that has been sunk by a submarine.

As Alex and Bruce venture to the lost city, an epidemic of the fever rages in the territory.

== Cast ==
- Buster Crabbe as Dr. Robert Hammond, aka Junga
- Charles B. Middleton as Rev. James Graham
- Sheila Darcy as Betty Graham
- Vince Barnett as Buckthorn the Guide
- Weldon Heyburn as Bruce Kellogg
- Robert Carson as Andy
- Paul Scott as William Graham
- Hal Price as Capt. Aleck
- Floyd Shackelford as Friday

== Production ==
The film had the working title of King of the Tropics. In 1951 it was retitled Drums of Africa as part of a package of PRC films now titled "Pictorial Films" that were sold to television.
