= Julie Duncan =

American film actress (1919–86)

Julie Duncan (January 17, 1919 – June 20, 1986) was an American film actress who appeared in short subjects and Westerns. A native of Cornish, New Hampshire, she was a champion steeplechase rider.

== Selected filmography ==
- Texas Terrors (1940)
- Wyoming Wildcat (1941)
- Desperate Cargo (1941)
- Fugitive Valley (1941)
- Overland Stagecoach (1942)
- Texas Trouble Shooters (1942)
- Bullets and Saddles (1943)
- Haunted Ranch (1943)
- Cowboy in the Clouds (1943)
- Youth Aflame (1944)

=== Short subjects ===
- Three Smart Saps (1942)
- Sappy Pappy (1942)
- They Stooge to Conga (1943)
