= Ridin' the Cherokee Trail =

1941 film

- Theatrical release poster
- Directed by: Spencer Gordon Bennet
- Screenplay by: Edmond Kelso
- Produced by: Edward Finney
- Starring: Tex Ritter; Slim Andrews; Forrest Taylor; Betty Miles; Jack Roper; Fred Burns
- Cinematography: Marcel Le Picard
- Edited by: Robert Golden
- Music by: Frank Sanucci
- Production company: Monogram Pictures
- Distributed by: Monogram Pictures
- Release date: February 25, 1941
- Running time: 61 minutes
- Country: United States
- Language: English

Ridin' the Cherokee Trail is a 1941 American Western film directed by Spencer Gordon Bennet and written by Edmond Kelso. The film stars Tex Ritter, Slim Andrews, Forrest Taylor, Betty Miles, Jack Roper and Fred Burns. The film was released on February 25, 1941, by Monogram Pictures.

== Plot ==
Texas Rangers Tex Ritter and Slim Andrews are tasked with stopping outlaw Bradley Craven, who is terrorizing a small territory to prevent it from joining the Union . Because Craven operates out of the Cherokee Strip where they have no jurisdiction, Tex and Slim go undercover, posing as outlaws to lure him across the border for arrest . They join forces with a local rancher and his daughter to stop the villain, leading to a series of skirmishes and a desperate final confrontation after their cover is blown .

== Cast ==
- Tex Ritter as Tex Ritter
- Slim Andrews as Slim
- Forrest Taylor as Brad Craven
- Betty Miles as Ruth Wyatt
- Jack Roper as Squint
- Fred Burns as Wyatt
- Nolan Willis as Dirk Fargo
- Gene Alsace as Bat
- Bob Card as Captain Wallace
- Chick Hannan as Blackie
- Jack Gillette as Tennessee Rambler Fiddle Player
- Harry Blair as Tennessee Rambler Guitar Player
- 'Happy Tex' Martin as Tennessee Rambler Banjo Player
- Cecil Campbell as Tennessee Rambler Steel Guitar Player
- Kid Clark as Tennessee Rambler Accordion Player
- Snub Pollard as Saloon Drunk (uncredited)
