= Sugar Dawn =

American former child actor

Mervelyn Sugar Steinberg, known as Sugar Dawn, (born 14 November 1931, in San Francisco) is an American former child actor who appeared in Western films during the 1930s and 1940s.

Dawn's co-stars included Tex Ritter and Tom Keene. Dawn was a trick rider too, and her pony was called Chiquita.

== Personal life ==
Dawn has been married twice, has one daughter, Dawn and two grandchildren.

== Partial filmography ==
- Lone Star Law Men (1941)
- Wanderers of the West (1941)
