= Tom Keene (actor) =

American actor (1896–1963)

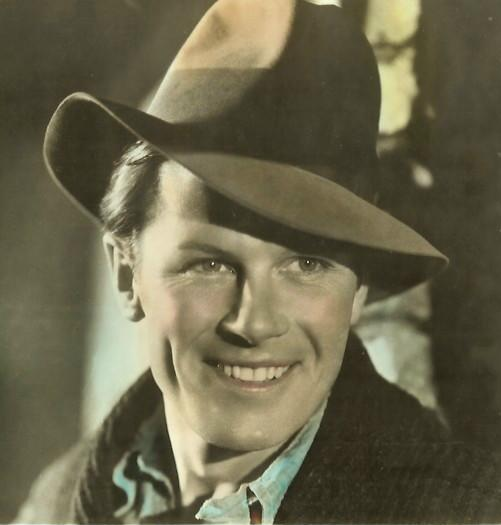
- Publicity photograph of Tom Keene for Our Daily Bread (1934)
- Born: George Duryea; December 30, 1896; Rochester, New York, U.S.
- Died: August 4, 1963 (aged 66); Woodland Hills, Los Angeles, California, U.S.
- Resting place: Forest Lawn Memorial Park Cemetery, Glendale, California, U.S.
- Other names: Dick Powers; Richard Powers
- Occupation: Actor
- Years active: 1923–1959
- Spouse: Grace Stafford (m. 1919; div. 1940)

Tom Keene (born George Duryea; December 30, 1896 – August 4, 1963) was an American actor known mostly for his roles in B Westerns. During his almost 40-year career in motion pictures Tom Keene worked under three different names. From 1923, when he made his first picture, until 1930 he worked under his birth name, George Duryea. The last film he made under this name was Pardon My Gun. Beginning with the 1930 film Tol'able David, he used Tom Keene as his moniker. This name he used until 1944 when he changed it to Richard Powers. The first film he used this name in was Up in Arms. He continued to primarily use this name for the rest of his film career, though still used Tom Keene on occasion.

== Early life and career ==
Born George Duryea (no known relation to fellow actor Dan Duryea despite a resemblance) in Rochester, New York, Keene studied at Columbia University and Carnegie Tech before embarking on an acting career. He made his film debut in the 1923 short film The Just a Little Late Club. Keene followed with roles in The Godless Girl (1929) directed by Cecil B. DeMille; Tide of Empire (1929) with Renée Adorée; Thunder with Lon Chaney, Sr.; Tol'able David (1930) and Sundown Trail (1931).

In 1934, King Vidor cast him in the socially conscious Depression oriented classic Our Daily Bread with Karen Morley.

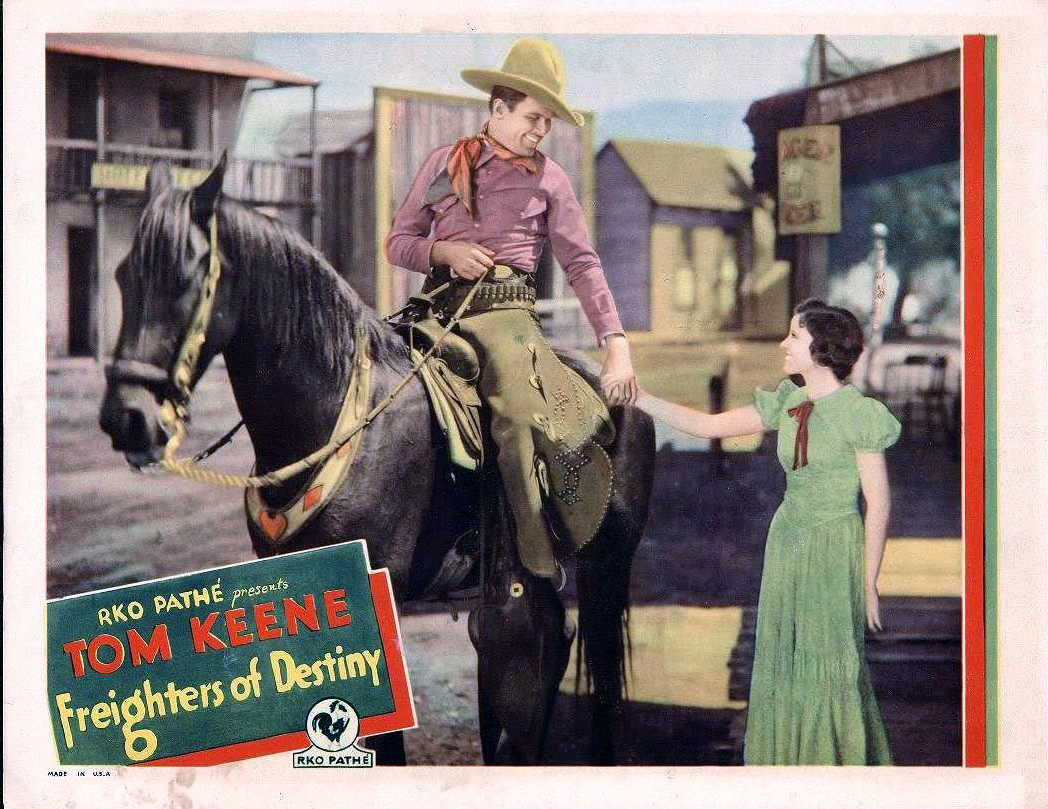
1931 lobby card

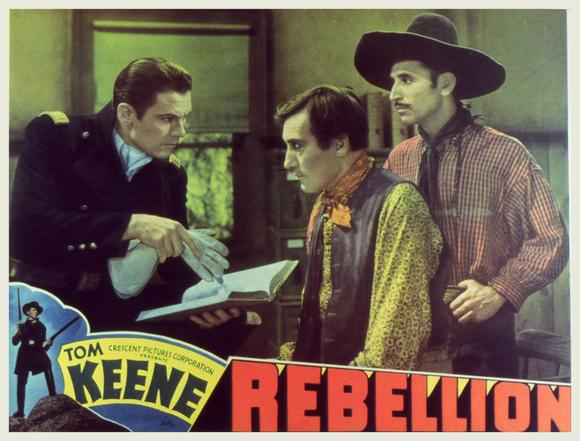
Keene (left) in 1936 lobby card

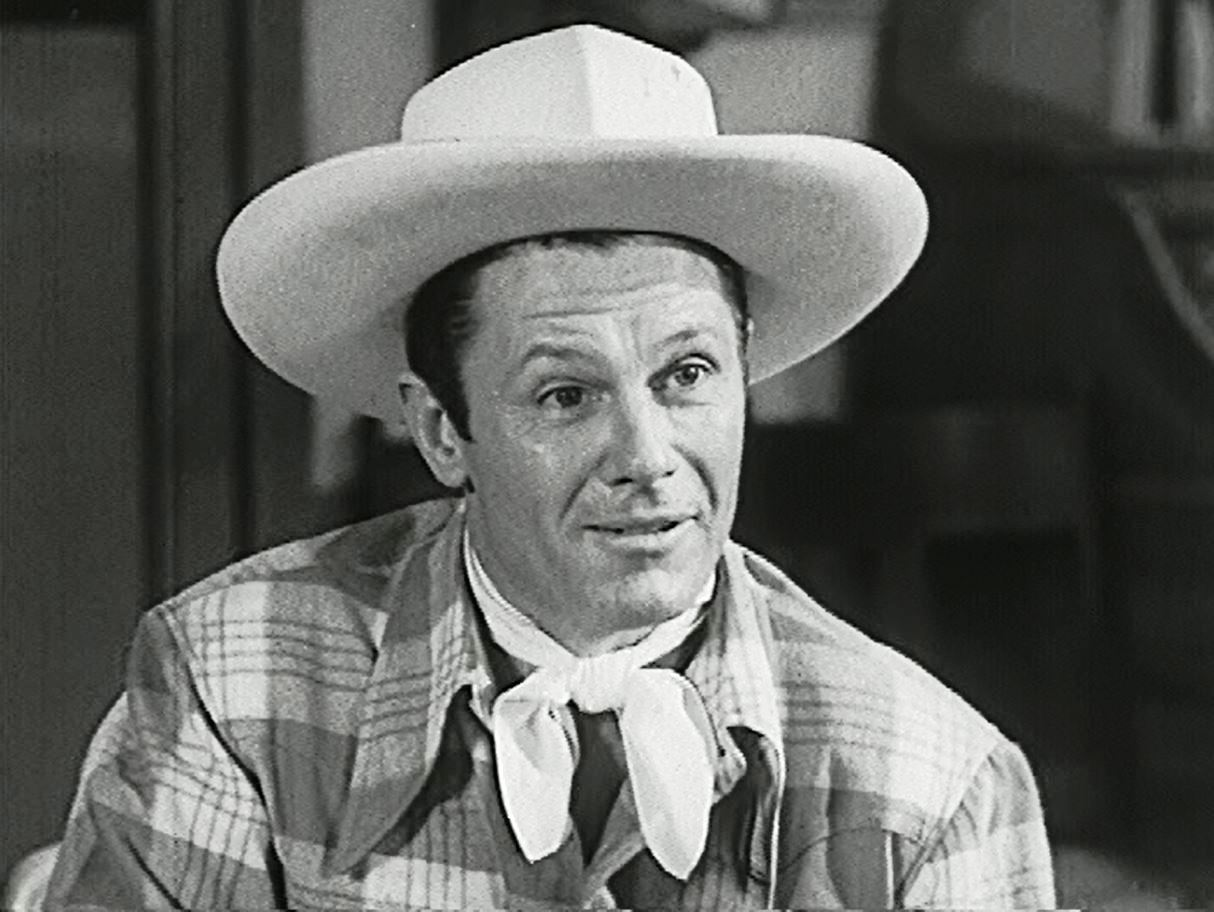
Tom Keene in Western Mail (1942)

During the 1940s, Keene appeared in the film serial The Great Alaskan Mystery and two Dick Tracy films Dick Tracy's Dilemma and Dick Tracy Meets Gruesome (1947). In the 1950s, he moved on to television with guest roles on The Range Rider; Buffalo Bill, Jr.; Fury; Judge Roy Bean and The Adventures of Ozzie and Harriet. Keene's last film role was in Ed Wood's cult film Plan 9 from Outer Space (1957). He retired soon after this and focused on real estate and the insurance business.

== Death ==
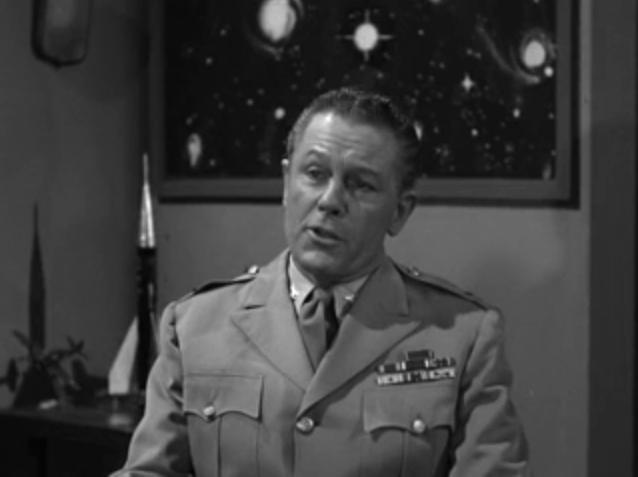
Tom Keene in Plan 9 from Outer Space (1959), his last role.

Keene died of cancer on August 4, 1963, aged 66. He was interred in the Forest Lawn Memorial Park Cemetery in Glendale, California.

== Filmography ==
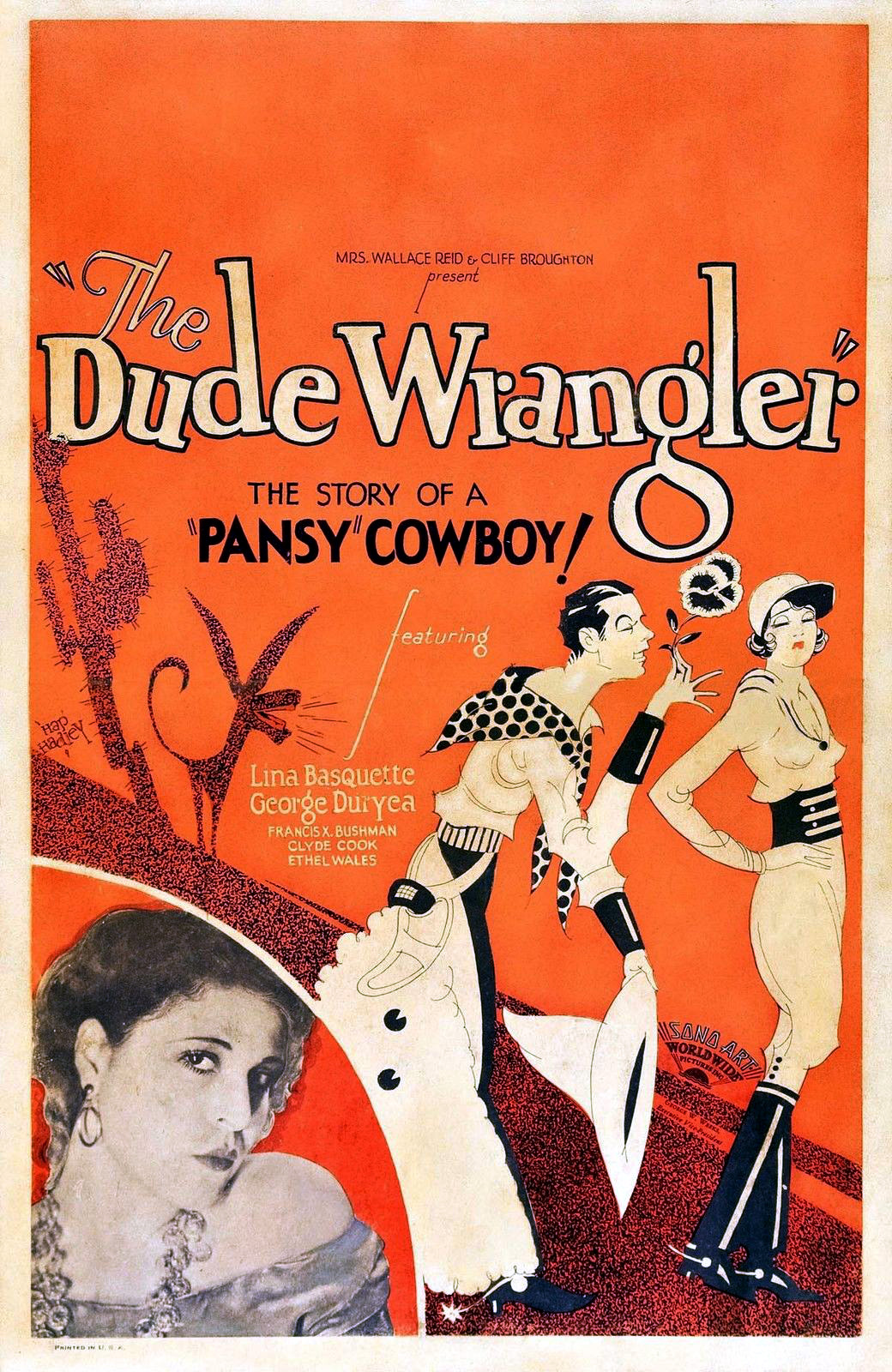
Poster for The Dude Wrangler (1930).

Later in his career (after 1944), Keene was often credited as Richard Powers, and once as Dick Powers.

Year	Title	Role	Notes
1928	The Godless Girl	Bob Hathaway	Credited as George Duryea
1928	Marked Money	Clyde	Credited as George Duryea
1929	Tide of Empire	Dermod D'Arcy	Credited as George Duryea
1929	Honky Tonk	Freddie Gilmore	Credited as George Duryea
1929	Thunder	Jim	Credited as George Duryea
1929	In Old California	Lt. Tony Hopkins	Credited as George Duryea
1930	Beau Bandit	W.S. "Bill" Howard	Credited as George Duryea
1930	The Dude Wrangler	Wally McCann	Credited as George Duryea
1930	Night Work	Harvey Vanderman	Credited as George Duryea
1930	Pardon My Gun	Ted Duncan	Credited as George Duryea
1930	Tol'able David	Alan Kinemon	
1931	Sundown Trail	Buck Sawyer	
1931	Freighters of Destiny	Steve Macey	
1931	Suicide Fleet	Lt. James Keene	Uncredited
1932	Partners	Dick Barstow	
1932	The Saddle Buster	Montana ("Monty")	
1932	Ghost Valley	Jerry Long	
1932	Beyond the Rockies	Blackjack	
1932	Come On Danger!	Larry Madden, Texas Ranger	
1932	Renegades of the West	Tom Bagby	
1933	The Cheyenne Kid	Tom Larkin	
1933	Scarlet River	Tom Baxter	
1933	Son of the Border	Tom Owens	
1933	Sunset Pass	Jack Rock / Jim Collins	
1933	Cross Fire	Tom 'Jack' Allen	
1934	Our Daily Bread	John Sims	Alternative title: Hell's Crossroads
1935	Hong Kong Nights	Himself	
1936	Timothy's Quest	David Masters	
1936	Drift Fence	Jim Travis	
1936	Desert Gold	Randolph Gale	
1936	The Glory Trail	Captain John Carroll	
1936	Rebellion	Captain John Carroll	
1937	Battle of Greed	John Storm	
1937	Old Louisiana	John Colfax	
1937	Under Strange Flags	Tom Kenyon	
1937	The Law Commands	Dr. Keith Kenton	
1937	Drums of Destiny	Capt. Jerry Crawford	
1937	Raw Timber	Tom Corbin	
1937	God's Country and the Man	Jim Reid	
1937	Where Trails Divide	Tom Allen	
1937	Romance of the Rockies	Dr. Tom Foster	
1938	The Painted Trail	Tom Gray posing as the Pecos Kid	
1941	Wanderers of the West	Tom Mallory posing as The Arizona Kid	
1941	Dynamite Canyon	Marshal Tom Evans Posing as Ed 'Trigger' Jones	
1941	The Drifin' Kid	Tom Sterling	
1941	Riding the Sunset Trail	Tom Sterling	
1941	Lone Star Law Men	Tom Sterling	
1942	Western Mail	Tom Allen	
1942	Arizona Roundup	Tom Kenyon	
1942	Where Trails End	Tom Kenyon	
1944	Up in Arms	Ashley's Aide	Credited as Richard Powers
1944	The Navy Way	Steve Appleby	Credited as Richard Powers
1944	The Great Alaskan Mystery	Burger	Serial [Ch. 11], Credited as Richard Powers
1944	Jungle Woman	Joe - Fingerprint Man	Credited as Richard Powers
1944	Goodnight, Sweetheart	Reporter	Uncredited
1944	The Port of 40 Thieves	Scott Barton	Credited as Richard Powers
1944	San Diego, I Love You	Reporter	Uncredited
1944	Lights of Old Santa Fe	Frank Madden	Credited as Richard Powers
1944	Sergeant Mike	Reed	Credited as Richard Powers
1945	Dangerous Intruder	Curtis	Credited as Richard Powers
1945	Girls of the Big House	Barton Sturgis	Credited as Richard Powers
1946	San Quentin	Hal Schaeffer, Robbery Detail	Credited as Richard Powers
1947	Dick Tracy's Dilemma	Fred	Credited as Richard Powers
1947	Seven Keys to Baldpate	Steve Bland	Credited as Richard Powers
1947	Thunder Mountain	Johnny Blue	Credited as Richard Powers
1947	Crossfire	Detective	Credited as Richard Powers
1947	Under the Tonto Rim	John Dennison	Credited as Richard Powers
1947	Dick Tracy Meets Gruesome	Dr. Frankey	Uncredited
1947	Wild Horse Mesa	Hod Slack	Credited as Richard Powers
1948	The Judge Steps Out	Mrs. Winthrop's Attorney	Uncredited
1948	Western Heritage	Spade Thorne	Credited as Richard Powers
1948	Berlin Express	Major	Credited as Richard Powers
1948	Race Street	Al	Credited as Richard Powers
1948	Return of the Bad Men	Jim Younger	Credited as Richard Powers
1948	Blood on the Moon	Ted Elser	Credited as Richard Powers
1948	Indian Agent	Monty Hutchins	Credited as Richard Powers
1949	Brothers in the Saddle	Nash Prescott	Credited as Richard Powers
1950	Storm over Wyoming	Tug Caldwell	Credited as Richard Powers
1950	Desperadoes of the West	Ward Gordon	Serial, Credited as Richard Powers
1950	The Milkman	Duzik	Uncredited
1950	Trail of Robin Hood	Himself	Credited as Tom Keene
1951	Texans Never Cry	Tracy Wyatt	Credited as Richard Powers
1951	The Fat Man	Mac	Uncredited
1951	Home Town Story	Abbott, Bob's campaign manager	Uncredited
1951	The Stu Erwin Show	Arthur Hale	Episode: "The Big Game"
1951	The Range Rider	Lang	Episode: "The Grand Fleece"
1952	Red Planet Mars	Major General George Burdette	Uncredited
1952	Sky King	Sheriff	2 episodes Credited as Richard Powers
1953	The Moonlighter	Sheriff	Credited as Richard Powers
1953	The Abbott and Costello Show	Joe	2 episodes Credited as Richard Powers
1953	General Electric Theater	Slocum	Episode: "Woman's World"; Credited as Richard Powers
1953	Crossroad Avenger	The Tucson Kid	TV Movie; Credited as Tom Keene
1954	Outlaw's Daughter	Bank Manager	Uncredited
1954	Hopalong Cassidy	Bill Bricker	Episode: "Steel Trails West"; Credited as Richard Powers
1955	Dig That Uranium	Frank Loomis	Credited as Richard Powers
1955	The Millionaire	Attorney Marlowe	Episode: "The Uncle Robby Story"
1956	Wetbacks	Highway Patrol Inspector	Credited as Richard Powers
1956	Tension at Table Rock	Man Killed by Sam	Uncredited
1957	Plan 9 from Outer Space	Col. Tom Edwards	Credited as Tom Keene
1958	Once Upon a Horse...	Himself	Credited as Tom Keene
1958	Casey Jones	John Patrick	Episode: "The Silk Train"; Credited as Richard Powers
1958	Tales of the Texas Rangers	Morgan Thorpe	Episode: "Traitor's Gold"; Credited as Richard Powers
1959	Death Valley Days	Charlie Duff	Episode: "Stagecoach Spy"; Credited as Richard Powers
