= Betty Miles =

American actress

- Born: Elizabeth Harriet Henninger; January 11, 1910; Santa Monica, California, U.S.
- Died: June 9, 1992 (aged 82); Hughson, California, U.S.
- Occupations: Film actress, stuntwoman, drama teacher, school educator

Betty Miles (January 11, 1910 – June 9, 1992) was an American B-movie film actress and stuntwoman of the late 1930s and well into the 1940s, who later became an educator. Her father, George Henry T. Henninger, was a Texas cattleman, and had taught her to ride horses from an early age.

== Early life ==
Born in Santa Monica, California as Elizabeth Harriet Henninger, she attended the University of Southern California, graduating from the college of Letters, Arts and Sciences in 1931. While attending college, she took part in several debate competitions, winning three. Educated, athletic, attractive, and an accomplished equestrian, she began acting after graduation, playing in several theater plays through 1936. In 1937, she had her first, albeit minor, film role, in Nothing Sacred.

== Acting and stuntwoman career ==
Having an interest in western films, she caught the attention of Monogram Pictures when, while watching the filming of a movie scene, she noticed that the actress was having difficulty with her riding, causing several retakes. Miles offered to help her with instruction, and in doing so she showed herself to be an accomplished and talented rider, and was given a contract by Monogram. In 1941 she starred in Ridin' the Cherokee Trail with Tex Ritter and Slim Andrews. That same year she starred in another five films, including The Return of Daniel Boone. During 1943–44 she starred in another six films, three in each year, often playing opposite Tom Keene. She starred in several of the Trail Blazer serials, alongside Hoot Gibson, Bob Steele, and Ken Maynard. Her last role was in Gangsters of the Frontier. In her films, she usually did her own riding and stunts, and often worked as a stuntwoman on films.

After her film career ended, she began working on tour with several circuses, alongside her friend and fellow accomplished rider and actress Evelyn Finley. At times during this period she taught dramatic acting classes at such studios as 20th Century Fox, Universal Pictures, and Columbia Pictures.

== Later life ==
By 1946 her involvement with acting had finished, and she elected not to return to the circus. She became a teacher for the Fresno, California public school system. She later served as the "Dean of Girls" for the Simi Valley school systems, then later held positions of a similar role in the Turlock and Los Angeles school systems. She retired from teaching in 1976, and moved to Hughson, California, where she lived the remainder of her life to be near to her son, Lynn Rees Miles (born March 8, 1942), and her two grandchildren. She died there on June 9, 1992, aged 82.
