= The Lone Defender =

1930 film

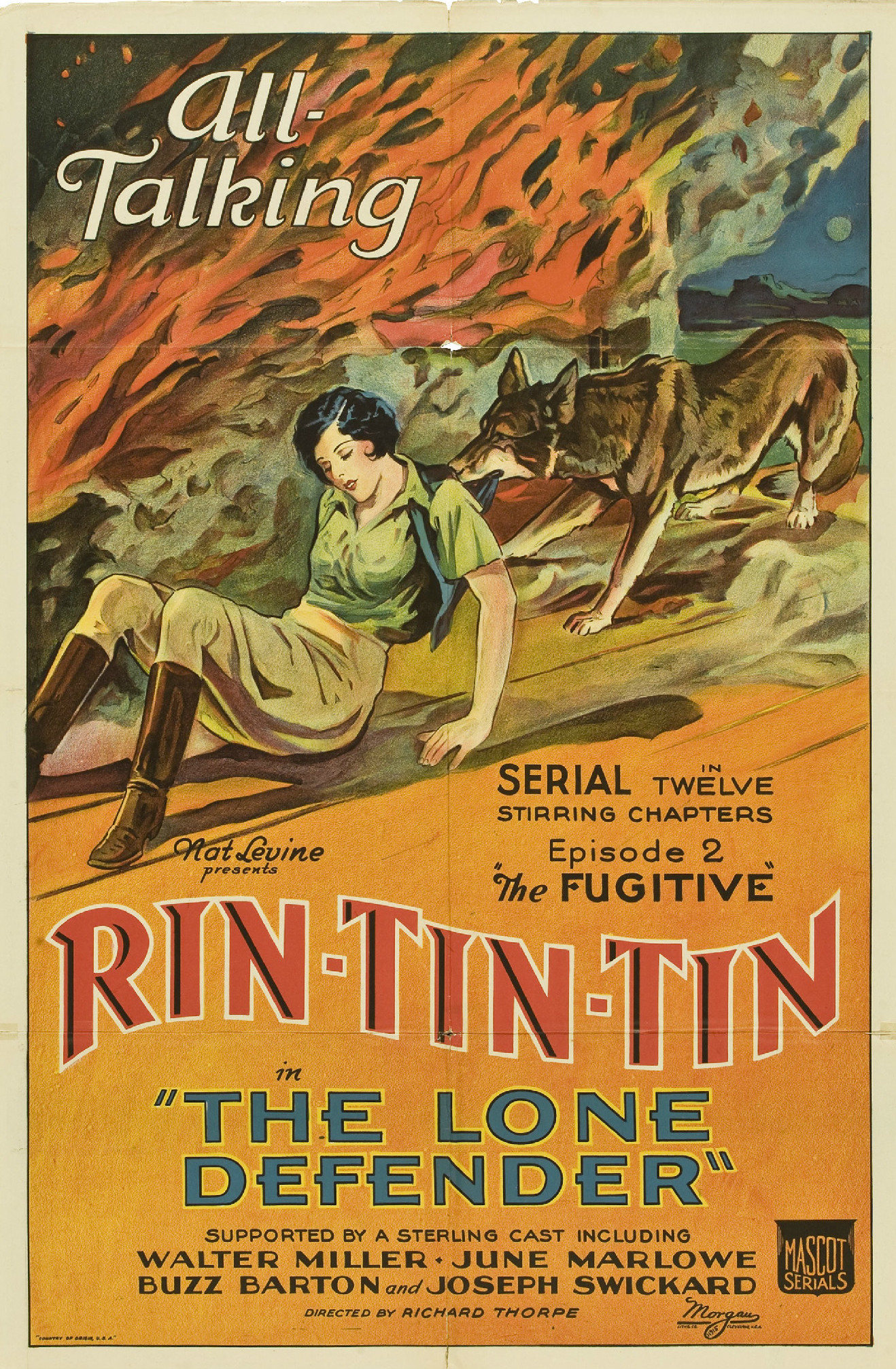
- Poster for chapter two of the serial
- Directed by: Richard Thorpe
- Written by: William Presley Burt; Bennett Cohen; Harry Fraser
- Produced by: Nat Levine
- Starring: Rin Tin Tin; Walter Miller; June Marlowe; Josef Swickard; Buzz Barton; Lee Shumway
- Cinematography: Benjamin Kline
- Edited by: Wyndham Gittens
- Music by: Lee Zahler
- Distributed by: Mascot Pictures
- Release date: 1930
- Running time: 12 chapters (217 min)
- Country: United States
- Language: English
- Budget: $40,000 (estimated)

The Lone Defender is a 1930 American Pre-Code Mascot Western serial film starring Rin Tin Tin. It was Mascot's first all-sound serial (the second to have any sound at all, after the partial sound in The King of the Kongo). It was Rin Tin Tin's first serial at Mascot, after being dropped by Warner Bros. when they decided animal pictures would not work with "Talkies". He also starred in the later serial The Lightning Warrior, which was his last appearance (he died in 1932).

The plot revolves around Rin Tin Tin as "Rinty" and a secret gold mine fought over by the criminal "The Cactus Kid" and the legitimate owners. Material from this serial was edited into a feature film version and released under the same name in 1934.

== Plot ==
Prospector Juan Valdez is murdered by The Cactus Kid and his gang in an attempt to discover the location of his gold mine. Valdez's dog Rinty witnesses the murder and can also lead the gang to the mine, making him the villains' target throughout the serial. In addition, while being blamed as the wolf that has been attacking local livestock, Rinty must help Valdez's daughter Dolores legitimately find and claim the mine.

The mysterious figure of Ramon is constantly on hand, overhearing pieces of the villains' conversations. He appears to be another bandit but his actions seem to contradict that. It is revealed in the finale of the serial that Ramon is in fact "Marco Roberto", an agent of the Justice Department.

== Cast ==
- Rin Tin Tin as "Rinty", Juan Valdez's dog
- Josef Swickard as Juan Valdez, Prospector who owns a secret gold mine
- June Marlowe as Dolores Valdez, Juan Valdez's daughter
- Walter Miller as Marco Roberto, Justice Department Agent posing as the "Mysterious Figure", Ramon
- Buzz Barton as Buzz, Ramon's sidekick
- Lee Shumway as Amos Harkey, the villainous cantina owner
- Julia Bejarano as Maria, the Dueña
- Lafe McKee as Sheriff Billings
- Arthur Morrison as Limpy
- Frank Lanning as Burke, Prospector and Juan Valdez's partner
- Bob Kortman as Jenkins, one of the Cactus Kid's Henchmen
- Victor Metzetti as Red, one of the Cactus Kid's Henchmen
- Otto Metzetti as Red's Partner

== Production ==
=== Stunts ===
- Joe Bonomo
- Kermit Maynard
- Arthur Metzetti
- Victor Metzetti

== Chapter titles ==
1. Mystery of the Desert
2. The Fugitive
3. Jaws of Peril
4. Trapped
5. Circle of Death
6. Surrounded by the Law
7. The Ghost Speaks
8. The Brink of Destruction
9. The Avalanche
10. Fury of the Desert
11. Cornered
12. Vindicated

_{Source:}

== See also ==
- List of film serials by year
- List of film serials by studio

Preceded by The King of the Kongo (1929)	Mascot Serial; The Lone Defender (1930)	Succeeded by The Phantom of the West (1931)
