= The Shadow of the Eagle =

1932 film

- Film poster
- Directed by: Ford Beebe; B. Reeves Eason
- Written by: Ford Beebe; Colbert Clark; Wyndham Gittens
- Produced by: Nat Levine
- Starring: John Wayne; Dorothy Gulliver; Kenneth Harlan; Walter Miller; Roy D'Arcy; Richard Tucker; Pat O'Malley; Ivan Linow
- Cinematography: Benjamin H. Kline; Victor Scheurich
- Edited by: Wyndham Gittens; Ray Snyder
- Music by: Lee Zahler
- Distributed by: Mascot Pictures
- Release date: February 1, 1932
- Running time: 12 chapters (218 minutes)
- Country: United States
- Language: English

The Shadow of the Eagle (a.k.a. Shadow of the Eagle) is a 1932 American Pre-Code Mascot 12 episode film serial, directed by Ford Beebe and B. Reeves Eason and produced by Nat Levine. The film stars John Wayne in his first serial role. He would go on to star in two other serials for Mascot, The Hurricane Express (1932) and The Three Musketeers (1933). The Shadow of the Eagle is now in the public domain.

== Plot ==
Colonel Nathan B. "Skipper" Gregory, a former World War I ace pilot, is the owner of a travelling carnival that has fallen on hard times. Only the money brought in by Craig McCoy, the carnival stunt pilot, keeps the carnival from closing. Jean Gregory, Colonel Gregory's daughter, works with Craig as a wing walker and parachutist.

A mysterious pilot, the legendary "Eagle", thought to have been shot down by accident by his own squadron and killed in the war, attempts to sabotage the Evans Aero Co., a large corporation. He sends threatening messages to the company's five directors by skywriting the date that the "Eagle" was shot down: May 23, 1918. Gregory is thought to be the Eagle because he has a grudge against Evans Aero, which stole his plans for a radio-piloted aircraft. Suspicion also falls on McCoy, who is also skilled in skywriting, and had left the message about the "Eagle" after being paid by an anonymous source.

Craig suspects that the "Eagle" is Mr. Green, a director of the corporation, a pilot who flew in the same squadron as the "Eagle", and the likely culprit who stole the plans to Gregory's invention. When confronted, Green escapes and teams up with two compatriots, Tim Moore and Boyle, but Craig grabs the plans and rushes back to the carnival to show Jean.

Gregory, who uses a wheelchair, tries to hide from the authorities. Someone steels Craig's aircraft and tries to burn down the carnival. Hoping to prove her father's innocence, the pair then learn of Gregory's disappearance, captured by the henchmen of the "Eagle". A murder occurs at the corporation and Gregory is again implicated.

Jean still thinks that her father is innocent and with Craig, escapes death on many occasions, fighting with gang members, as they go after the real "Eagle". Craig enlist the aid of the carnival's midget, strongman, and ventriloquist to track down the criminal (the characters here uncannily resembling those in the 1930 Lon Chaney film The Unholy Three). Craig unmasks the evildoer and brings the ordeal to an end.

== Cast ==
- John Wayne as Craig McCoy
- Edward Hearn as Colonel Nathan B. Gregory
- Dorothy Gulliver as Jean Gregory, Colonel Gregory's daughter
- Richard Tucker as Major Evans, company owner
- Ivan Linow as Heinie, the carnival strongman
- James Bradbury Jr. as Henry, the carnival ventriloquist
- Ernie Adams as Frederick "Pat" Kelly, the carnival barker
- Billy West as Bob the Clown
- Lloyd Whitlock as Green, a director
- Walter Miller as Danby, a director
- Edmund Burns as Clark, a director
- Pat O'Malley as Ames, a director
- Kenneth Harlan as Ward, a director
- "Little Billy" Rhodes as the Midget
- Roy D'Arcy as Gardner
- Bud Osborne as Tim Moore
- Yakima Canutt as Boyle
- Monte Montague as Policeman Callahan
- Murdock MacQuarrie as Frank the Watchman (uncredited)

== Chapter titles ==
1. The Carnival Mystery
2. Pinholes
3. The Eagle Strikes
4. The Man of a Million Voices
5. The Telephone Cipher
6. The Code of the Carnival
7. Eagle or Vulture?
8. On the Spot
9. When Thieves Fall Out
10. The Man Who Knew
11. The Eagle's Wings
12. The Shadow Unmasked

_{Source:}

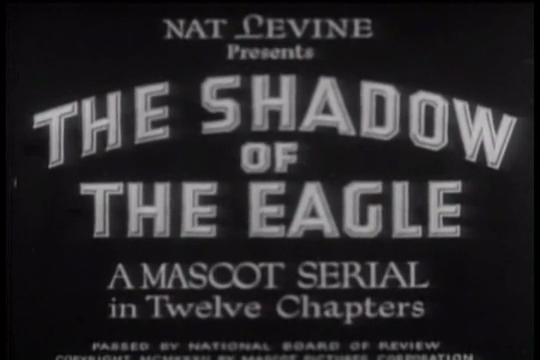
Title card

== Production ==
During the 1930s, after starring in The Big Trail (1930), its subsequent commercial failure meant that Wayne was relegated to minor roles in A-pictures, or starring, with his name over the title, in many low-budget Poverty Row Westerns, mostly at Monogram Pictures and serials for Mascot Pictures Corporation, such as The Shadow of the Eagle. (Note: By Wayne's own estimation, he appeared in about 80 horse operas from 1930 to 1939.)

The Shadow of the Eagle was cheaply staged and relied heavily on studio sets for interior sequences, although much of the carnival scenes are shot outdoors. Although one of the "poverty row" studios, Mascot was important to Wayne's career and he went on to make two more serials for the studio. In The Shadow of the Eagle, Wayne does most of his own stunt work, which solidified him as a bona fide action star. As the carnival stunt pilot, a Travel Air 2000, commonly known as the "Wichita Fokker", was a popular aircraft used in Hollywood features.

== Reception ==
Although concentrating on the aviation aspects of the production, aviation film historian James M. Farmer in Celluloid Wings: The Impact of Movies on Aviation (1984), characterized The Shadow of the Eagle as a lightweight formula melodrama.

Like many other serials, The Shadow of the Eagle was re-edited into a feature film version when it was released in home video form. The chapter screen titles were eliminated to create a more continuous flow.

== See also ==
- John Wayne filmography
- List of American films of 1932
- List of film serials
- List of film serials by studio
- List of films in the public domain in the United States

| Preceded by The Lightning Warrior (1931) | Mascot Serial; The Shadow of the Eagle (1932) | Succeeded by The Last of the Mohicans (1932) |
