= The Phantom of the West =

1931 film

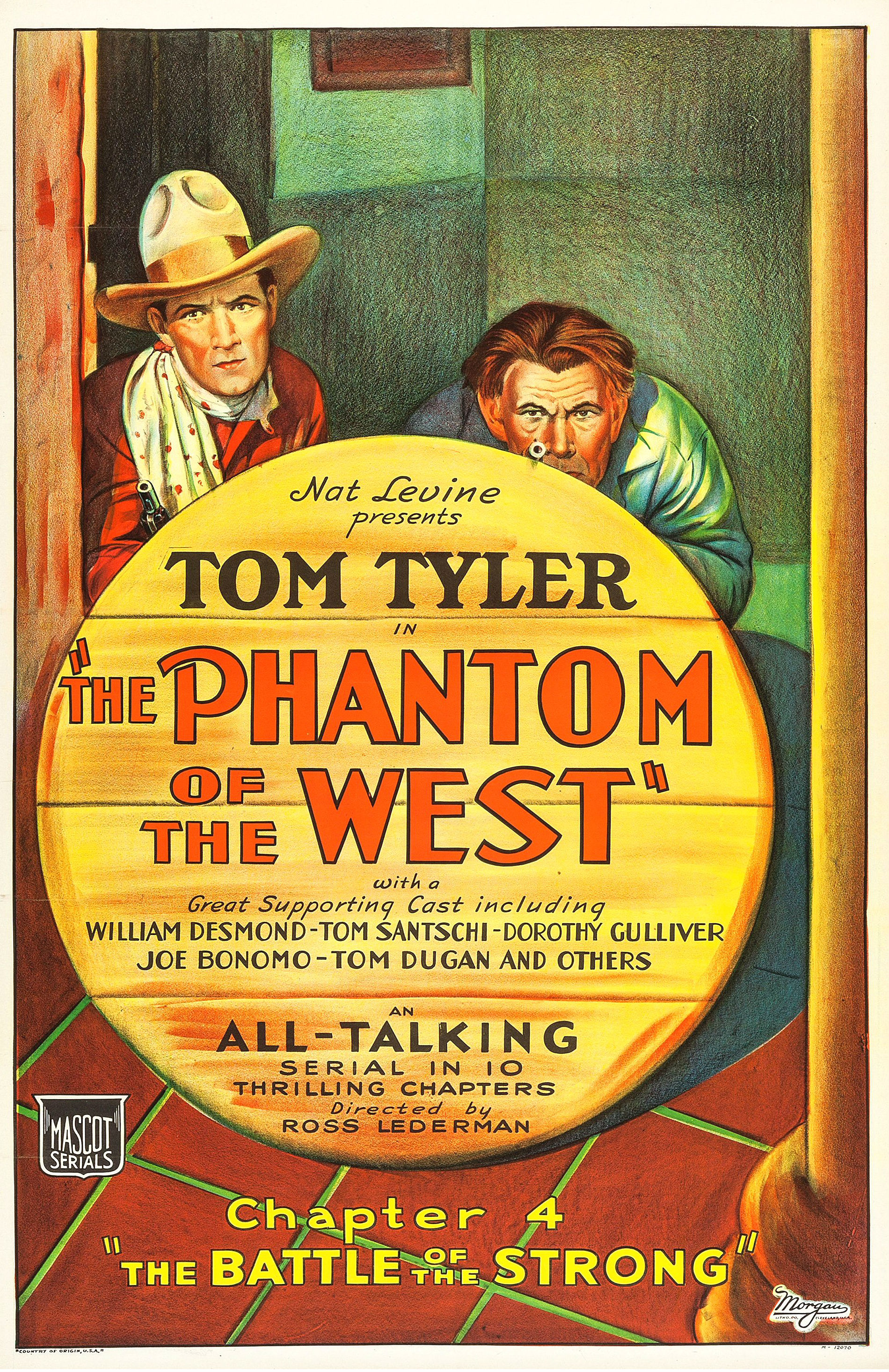
- Film poster
- Directed by: D. Ross Lederman; Theodore Joos
- Written by: Wyndham Gittens; Ford Beebe; Ben Cohen
- Produced by: Nat Levine
- Starring: Tom Tyler; William Desmond; Tom Santschi; Dorothy Gulliver; Philo McCullough; Frank Lanning
- Cinematography: M. A. Anderson; Ben Kline; Joseph Novak
- Edited by: Wyndham Gittens
- Music by: Lee Zahler
- Distributed by: Mascot Pictures
- Release date: January 1, 1931
- Running time: 10 chapters (172 minutes)
- Country: United States
- Language: English

The Phantom of the West is a 1931 American pre-Code Western film serial and was the second all-talking serial produced by Mascot Pictures. Tom Tyler stars as Jim Lester, trying to prove that Francisco Cortez (Frank Lanning) is innocent of killing Lester's father years before. The real villain is the mysterious Phantom and his League of the Lawless.

== Plot summary ==
Francisco Cortez escapes prison after serving fifteen years for the murder of Jim Lester's father. Hunted by a posse, the escaped convict takes refuge in Jim Lester's house. When Lester discovers him, Cortez proclaims his innocence. He lists the names of seven men, one of which is the real killer, the murderer calling himself "The Phantom".

== Cast ==
- Tom Tyler as Jim Lester
- William Desmond as Martin Blaine
- Tom Santschi as Bud Landers
- Dorothy Gulliver as Mona Cortez, Francisco Cortez's daughter
- Philo McCullough as Royce Macklin
- Frank Lanning as Francisco Cortez, escaped convict falsely accused of murdering Jim Lester's father
- Tom Dugan as Oscar, Sheriff's deputy and comic relief
- Joe Bonomo as Keno, a gunman
- Frank Hagney as Sheriff Jim H. Ryan
- Hallie Sullivan as Ruby Blair
- Kermit Maynard as Peter Drake
- Dick Dickinson as Harvey Stewart

== Production ==
=== Stunts ===
- Joe Bonomo
- Yakima Canutt
- Cliff Lyons
- Kermit Maynard

== Chapter titles ==
1. The Ghost Rides
2. Stairway of Doom
3. Horror in the Dark
4. Battle of the Strong
5. League of the Lawless
6. Canyon of Calamity
7. Price of Silence
8. House of Hate
9. Fatal Secret
10. Rogue's Roundup

_{Source:}

== See also ==
- List of film serials
- List of film serials by studio

Preceded by The Lone Defender (1930)	Mascot Serial; The Phantom of the West (1931)	Succeeded by King of the Wild (1931)
