= The Three Musketeers (1933 serial) =

- Film poster
- Directed by: Armand Schaeffer; Colbert Clark
- Written by: Norman Hall; Colbert Clark; Ben Cohn; Wyndham Gittens
- Based on: The Three Musketeers; 1844 novel by Alexandre Dumas
- Produced by: Nat Levine
- Starring: John Wayne; Ruth Hall; Jack Mulhall; Raymond Hatton; Francis X. Bushman Jr.
- Edited by: Ray Snyder
- Music by: Lee Zahler
- Distributed by: Mascot Pictures
- Release date: April 7, 1933
- Running time: 12 chapters (210 min); Film (96 min)
- Country: United States
- Language: English

The Three Musketeers is a 1933 American pre-Code film serial directed by Armand Schaeffer and Colbert Clark, and produced by Nat Levine for Mascot Pictures. The film serial was very loosely based on Alexandre Dumas' 1844 novel The Three Musketeers, with the musketeers changed into three soldiers in the French Foreign Legion, and d'Artagnan being reconfigured as Lt. Tom Wayne (played by John Wayne), a pilot in the United States military.

Wayne only received fourth billing behind Raymond Hatton, Francis X. Bushman Jr. and Jack Mulhall who play the three legionnaires. Lon Chaney Jr. had a co-starring role in the serial, mainly appearing in chapters one and ten.

== Plot ==
In the harsh deserts of North Africa, the French Foreign Legion provides a military presence. Lt. Tom Wayne is framed for the murder of Armand Corday, his fiancé's brother. He vows to capture the real killer, a mysterious Arab terrorist known only as El Shaitan. He encounters three bumptious legionnaires: Clancy, an Irishman always spoiling for a fight; Renard, a wily Frenchman; and Schmidt, a German who loves sausages. They are the surviving members of a Foreign Legion unit that was wiped out in an attack.

Nicknamed the "Devil of the Desert", El Shaitan remains a shadowy figure, hiding his face and his true identity, as a result of which many people are mistakenly suspected of being the cult leader in the course of the serial, while other characters impersonate him for their own ends. At a meeting place called "The Devil's Circle", El Shaitan commands a fanatic desert cult, a secret society formed to fight against the French authorities.

When Clancy, Renard and Schmidt are trapped by a horde of Berber tribesmen, Lt. Wayne quickly stops the attack using the machine gun mounted on his aircraft. The three legionnaires are in constant danger but Wayne comes to their rescue many times, acting as a modern-day d'Artagnan. Eventually, the trio, with the aid of their new friend, triumph over their adversaries.

== Cast ==
- John Wayne as Tom Wayne
- Ruth Hall as Elaine Corday
- Jack Mulhall as Clancy
- Raymond Hatton as Renard
- Francis X. Bushman Jr. (Ralph Bushman) as Schmidt
- Noah Beery Jr. as Stubbs
- Al Ferguson as Ali, chief henchman
- Hooper Atchley as El Kadur
- George Magrill as El Maghreb
- Edward Peil Sr. as Ratkin
- Gordon de Main as Colonel Duval
- William Desmond as Captain Boncour
- Robert Warwick as Colonel Brent
- Creighton Chaney (Lon Chaney Jr.) as Armand Corday
- Robert Frazer as Major Booth.

(Note: Frazer played both the masked El Shaitan and Major Booth but, once unmasked, El Shaitan's identity turned out to be one of the other suspects. Cline considers this "all quite confusing.")

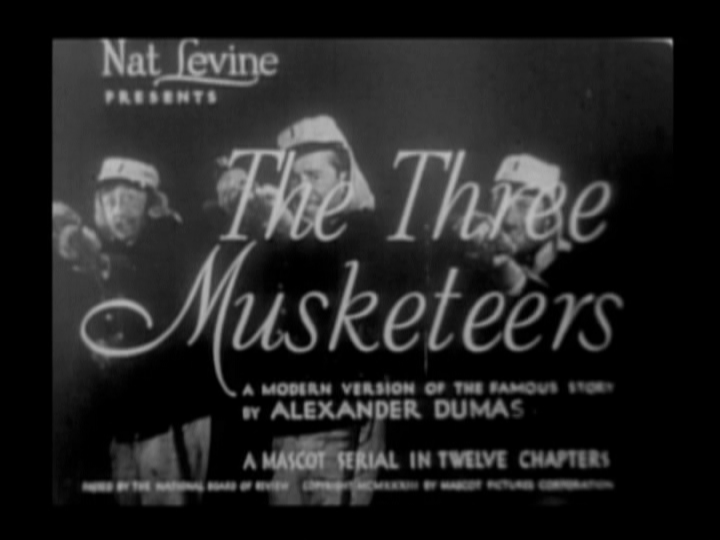
The Three Musketeers title card screenshot

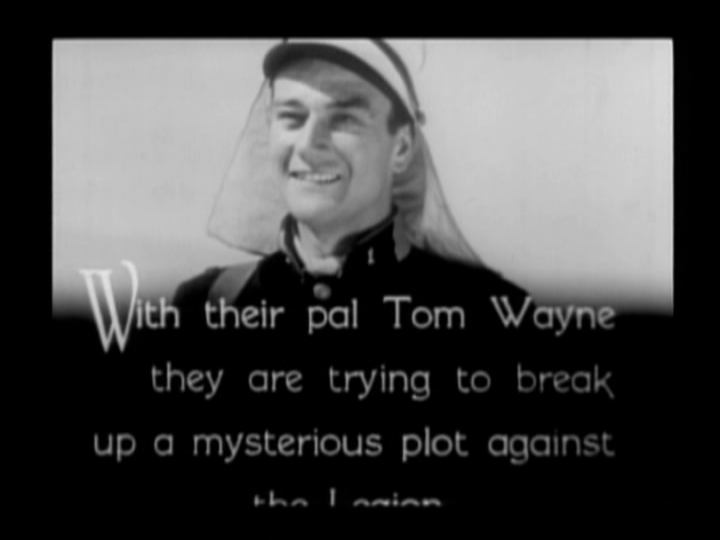
John Wayne as Lt. Tom Wayne

== Reception ==
Like many other serials, The Three Musketeers was reedited into a feature film version when it was rereleased. In 1946, Favorite Films Corporation edited the serial into a 60-minute feature film called Desert Command. The chapter screen titles were eliminated to create a more continuous flow.

== Chapters ==
1. The Fiery Circle
2. One for All - and All for One!
3. The Master Spy
4. Pirates of the Desert
5. Rebel Rifles
6. Death's Marathon
7. Naked Steel
8. The Master Strikes
9. The Fatal Cave
10. Trapped
11. The Measure of a Man
12. The Glory of Comrades

_{Source:}

== John Wayne ==
During the 1930s, after starring in The Big Trail (1930), its subsequent commercial failure meant that Wayne was relegated to minor roles in A-pictures, or starring, with his name over the title, in many low-budget Poverty Row Westerns, mostly at Monogram Pictures and serials for Mascot Pictures Corporation. Wayne would star in two other Mascot serials: The Shadow of the Eagle (1932) and The Hurricane Express (1932). (Note: By Wayne's own estimation, he appeared in about 80 horse operas from 1930 to 1939.)

== See also ==
- John Wayne filmography
- List of American films of 1933
- List of film serials
- List of film serials by studio
- List of films in the public domain in the United States

Preceded by The Whispering Shadow (1933)	Mascot Serial; The Three Musketeers (1933)	Succeeded by Fighting with Kit Carson (1933)
