= The Golden Stallion (1927 film) =

1927 film

- Directed by: Harry S. Webb
- Written by: William A. Berke; Carl Krusada
- Produced by: Nat Levine
- Starring: Maurice 'Lefty' Flynn; Joe Bonomo
- Distributed by: Mascot Pictures
- Release date: January 15, 1927
- Running time: 10 episodes
- Country: United States
- Languages: Silent; English intertitles

The Golden Stallion is a 1927 American silent Western film serial produced by Nat Levine's Mascot Pictures (the first serial produced by Mascot) and directed by Harry S. Webb.

== Plot ==
Two men search for a fabled gold mine. The clue to the mine's location is branded on the neck of a wild horse, "White Fury", and the men battle each other to capture the horse first.

== Cast ==
- Maurice Bennett Flynn as Wynne Randall
- Joe Bonomo as Ewart Garth
- Jay J. Bryan as Black Eagle
- Ann Small as Watona
- White Fury the Horse as The Golden Stallion
- Bert De Marc
- Billy Franey
- Tom London as Jules La Roux
- Molly Malone as Joan Forythe
- Burr McIntosh as Elmer Kendall
- Josef Swickard as John Forsythe
