= Heroes of the Wild =

1927 film

- Directed by: Harry S. Webb
- Written by: Carl Krusada
- Produced by: Nat Levine
- Starring: Jack Hoxie; Josephine Hill
- Distributed by: Mascot Pictures
- Release date: November 1, 1927
- Running time: 10 episodes
- Country: United States
- Languages: Silent; English intertitles

Heroes of the Wild is a 1927 American silent Western film serial produced by Nat Levine, directed by Harry S. Webb and released by Mascot Pictures. The film is considered to be lost.

== Plot ==
A young woman is heir to a large fortune, but the key to finding it is on the leg markings of a horse called "The Ghost of the Gauchos". Unfortunately, the woman's uncle—her legal guardian—has his own plans for her fortune, and they don't include sharing it with her.

== Cast ==
- Jack Hoxie as Jack Hale
- Josephine Hill as Selma Sanderson
- Joe Bonomo as John Kemp
- Tornado the Dog as Tornado
- White Fury the Horse as White Fury
- Linda Loredo as Carmen
- Jay J. Bryan as Winslow
- Emily Gerdes as Myra
- Helen Gibson as Julia
