= The Galloping Ghost (serial) =

1931 film

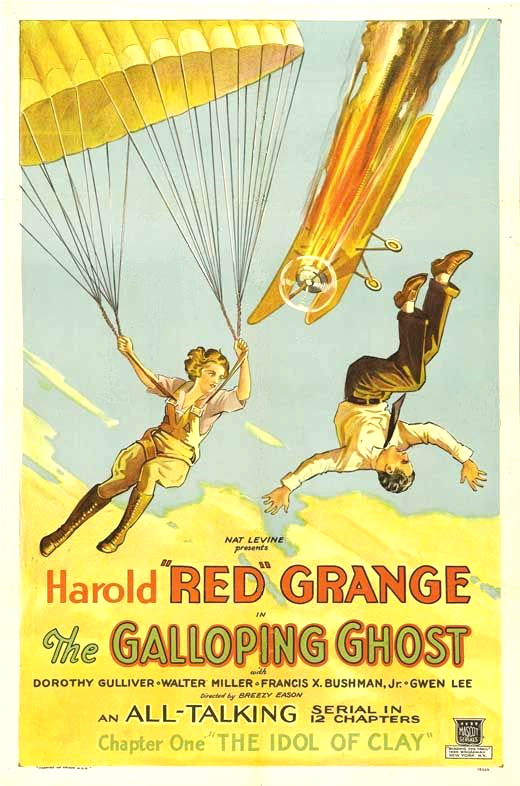
- Film poster
- Directed by: B. Reeves Eason; Benjamin H. Kline
- Written by: Ford Beebe; Wyndham Gittens; Helmer Walton Bergman
- Produced by: Nat Levine
- Starring: Harold "Red" Grange; Dorothy Gulliver; Tom Dugan; Gwen Lee; Ralph Bushman
- Cinematography: Tom Galligan; Benjamin H. Kline; Ernest Miller
- Edited by: Ray Snyder; Gilmore Walker
- Music by: Lee Zahler
- Distributed by: Mascot Pictures
- Release date: September 1, 1931 (United States)
- Running time: 12 chapters (226 minutes)
- Country: United States
- Language: English

The Galloping Ghost is a 1931 American pre-Code Mascot serial film co-directed by B. Reeves Eason and Benjamin H. Kline. The title is the nickname of the star, real life American football player Red Grange. Serial historian Raymond William Stedman lists Lon Chaney Jr. as appearing in Ghost in a small uncredited part as a henchman, but this has never been verified.

== Plot ==
Red Grange is thrown off the Clay College football team in disgrace when his friend, Buddy Courtland, takes a bribe to throw the big game and Red attacks him in anger. Red then proceeds to investigate and hunt down the head of the gambling ring responsible, a criminal enterprise operated out of the Mogul Taxi company offices. Red eventually clears his name, and both he and Buddy are reinstated on the team.

== Cast ==
- Harold 'Red' Grange as "Red" Grange, Clay College Football Star
- Ralph Bushman as Buddy Courtland
- Dorothy Gulliver as Barbara Courtland, Red's Girlfriend
- Tom Dugan as Jerry, Red's Sidekick
- Gwen Lee as Irene Courtland, Buddy's Wife
- Theodore Lorch as Dr. Julian Blake, Brain Surgeon
- Walter Miller as George Elton
- Edward Hearn as Coach Harlow
- Edward Peil, Sr. as The Coach of Baxter Team
- Stepin Fetchit as "Snowball"
- Wilfred Lucas as Sportscaster
- Frank Brownlee as Tom, Garage Manager
- Ernie Adams as Brady, Henchman
- Dick Dickinson as Mogul Taxi Clerk, Henchman
- Tom London as Mullins, Henchman
- Yakima Canutt as Henchman (uncredited)
- Lon Chaney Jr. as Henchman (uncredited) - unverified
- Fred Toones as a Football Fan (uncredited)

== Production ==
Grange received this starring role thanks to his business manager, and theater owner, Frank Zambrino. The serial took three weeks to film and Grange earned $4,500 overall.

Director B. Reeves Eason was reportedly fired during filming and replaced by the uncredited Benjamin H. Kline.

=== Stunts ===
This serial was filmed at a time before "stuntmen did mostly everything" which meant that Grange had to do a lot of his own stunts.

== Chapter titles ==
1. The Idol of Clay
2. Port of Peril
3. The Master Mind
4. The House of Secrets
5. The Man Without a Face
6. The Torn $500 Bill
7. When the Lights Went Out
8. The Third Degree
9. Sign in the Sky
10. The Vulture's Lair
11. The Radio Patrol
12. The Ghost Comes Back

_{Source:}

== See also ==
- List of American football films
- List of film serials by year
- List of film serials by studio

Preceded by The Vanishing Legion (1931)	Mascot Serial; The Galloping Ghost (1931)	Succeeded by The Lightning Warrior (1931)
