= The Vanishing Legion =

1931 film

- Theatrical release poster
- Directed by: Ford Beebe; B. Reeves Eason
- Written by: Wyndham Gittens; Ford Beebe; Helmer Walton Bergman
- Produced by: Nat Levine
- Starring: Harry Carey; Edwina Booth; Frankie Darro; Rex the Wonder Horse
- Distributed by: Mascot Pictures
- Release date: June 2, 1931
- Running time: 12 chapters (220 min)
- Country: United States
- Language: English

The Vanishing Legion is a 1931 American pre-Code Western film serial from Mascot, directed by Ford Beebe and B. Reeves Eason.

Stars Harry Carey and Edwina Booth were originally intended to be in the studio's previous serial, King of the Wild, but had to be re-cast when the MGM film Trader Horn (1931) overran its schedule. Both also starred in the Mascot serial The Last of the Mohicans and Carey was the lead in The Devil Horse. An infection received while filming Trader Horn led to Booth's retirement from acting. Boris Karloff supplied the voice of the serial's mystery villain, "The Voice".

== Plot ==
Masked mystery villain The Voice is out to sabotage the Milesburg Oil Co. "Happy" Cardigan needs to successfully drill for oil before his contract with Milesburg expires or he goes broke. Jimmie Williams' father, Jed (Edward Hearn), has been framed for murder. Secretary Caroline Hall appears to have an ulterior motive. The mysterious "Vanishing Legion" is also on the scene. Jimmie and Cardigan team up, along with Jimmie's horse Rex, to defeat The Voice and solve the mysteries surrounding Milesburg.

== Cast ==
- Harry Carey as "Happy" Cardigan, drilling for oil before his contract expires
- Edwina Booth as Caroline Hall
- Frankie Darro as Jimmie Williams, whose father is wanted for murder, teams up with Cardigan to unmask The Voice
- Rex the Wonder Horse as Rex, King of Wild Horses, whom only Jimmie can ride
- William Desmond as Milesburg's Sheriff
- Philo McCullough as Stevens
- Yakima Canutt as Yak
- Joe Bonomo as Stuffy
- Tom Dugan as Warren, Oil Company director
- Lafe McKee as Hornbeck, Oil Company lawyer
- Bob Kortman as Marno, henchman of The Voice
- Paul Weigel as Larribee, another Oil Company director
- Olive Carey as Nurse Lewis
- Boris Karloff as the voice of The Voice, the serial's masked mystery villain

== Chapter titles ==
1. Voice from the Void
2. Queen of the Night Riders
3. The Invisible Enemy
4. The Fatal Message
5. The Trackless Trail
6. The Radio Riddle
7. The Crimson Clue
8. Doorway of Disaster
9. When Time Stood Still
10. Riding the Whirlwind
11. Capsule of Oblivion
12. Hoofs of Horror [sic]

_{Source:}

== See also ==
- Harry Carey filmography
- Boris Karloff filmography
- List of film serials
- List of film serials by studio

Preceded by King of the Wild (1931)	Mascot Serial; The Vanishing Legion (1931)	Succeeded by The Galloping Ghost (1931)
