= The Hurricane Express =

1932 film

- Film poster
- Directed by: Armand Schaeffer; J.P. McGowan
- Written by: Colbert Clark; Barney Sarecky; Wyndham Gittens; George Morgan; J.P. McGowan
- Produced by: Nat Levine
- Starring: John Wayne; Shirley Grey; Conway Tearle; Tully Marshall; J. Farrell MacDonald; Matthew Betz; Edmund Breese; James Burtis; Joseph Girard; Lloyd Whitlock
- Distributed by: Mascot Pictures
- Release date: August 1, 1932
- Running time: 12 chapters (227 min)
- Country: United States
- Language: English

The Hurricane Express, condensed version

The Hurricane Express, Chapter 1: The Wrecker

The Hurricane Express is a 1932 American Pre-Code 12-chapter Mascot Pictures film serial. Written by Colbert Clark, Barney Sarecky, Wyndham Gittens, George Morgan, and J.P. McGowan, the serial was directed by Armand Schaeffer and J.P. McGowan and produced by Nat Levine. The Hurricane Express stars John Wayne as aircraft pilot Larry Baker. Wayne goes after a mystery villain named "The Wrecker", who was responsible for a train crash that killed Baker's father.

== Plot ==
The L & R Railroad is in competition with an airline for lucrative transport contracts. When the "Hurricane Express" is sabotaged and involved in a train wreck, one of his victims is Larry Baker's father, Jim. A mysterious figure known as "the Wrecker" is responsible for the train crashes. Air Transport Company pilot Baker wants to find the Wrecker, but with a host of suspects, it will be difficult, since the murderer can disguise himself to look like almost anyone.

One of the main suspects in the train crashes is Walter Gray, the airline manager and Larry's boss, who stands to gain if the L & R Railroad loose contracts. Suspicion is also cast on Tom Jordan, a recently discharged and disgruntled railroad engineer. Another suspect is Frank Stratton, an escaped convict who had wrongfully been convicted. Complicating matters is that Gloria Stratton is Frank Stratton's daughter, and Larry is in love with her.

Gloria tries to help Larry find the villains behind the train crashes, and when the "Hurricane Express" is again ready to go back into service, the pair are in air, flying as an escort to the speeding train. With a full load of gold, the train is a tempting target for the Wrecker.

The continuing attacks on the L & R Railroad put Gloria and Larry in danger, but they are determined to bring the Wrecker and his gang to justice. Finally, the young pilot is able to capture the murderers and can to look forward to a happy future with Gloria.

== Chapter titles ==
1. The Wrecker
2. Flying Pirates
3. The Masked Menace
4. Buried Alive
5. Danger Lights
6. Airport Mystery
7. Sealed Lips
8. Outside the Law
9. The Invisible Enemy
10. The Wrecker's Secret
11. Wings of Death
12. Unmasked

_{Source:}

== Cast ==
- Tully Marshall as Howard L. Edwards, Railroad manager
- Conway Tearle as Stevens, Railroad attorney
- John Wayne as Larry Baker
- Shirley Grey as Gloria Stratton, aka Gloria Martin
- Edmund Breese as Frank Stratton, Gloria's father
- Lloyd Whitlock as Walter Gray, Airline manager
- Al Bridge as Carlson, Plainville station agent
- Matthew Betz as Tom Jordan, a railroad engineer
- Joseph W. Girard as Detective Matthews
- James P. Burtis as Detective Hemingway, Matthews' assistant
- Ernie Adams as Henchman Barney, The Wrecker's machine gunner henchman
- Charles King as Mike, one of The Wrecker's henchmen
- J. Farrell MacDonald as Jim Baker, a railroad engineer (Larry Baker's Dad)
- Al Ferguson as Sandy, The Wrecker's pilot
- Glenn Strange as Jim, one of The Wrecker's henchmen
- Fred "Snowflake" Toones as Sam, the Porter (uncredited)
- Yakima Canutt as Henchman (uncredited)

== Production ==
During the 1930s, after starring in The Big Trail (1930), its subsequent commercial failure meant that Wayne was relegated to minor roles in A-pictures, or starring, with his name over the title, in many low-budget Poverty Row Westerns, mostly at Monogram Pictures and serials for Mascot Pictures Corporation, such as The Hurricane Express. (Note: By Wayne's own estimation, he appeared in about 80 horse operas from 1930 to 1939.)

The Hurricane Express was cheaply staged and relied heavily on studio sets for interior sequences. Two elements, however, were critical, the use of a train and an aircraft. Airline pilot Larry Baker flies as the co-pilot on a Trans World Airlines Ford Trimotor (c/n NC8411). The aircraft flew from the Grand Central Airport in Glendale, California, a favourite locale for Hollywood films featuring aviation.

While the Ford Trimotor appears in the first two chapters, the Curtiss "Jenny" is used in an aircraft-to-train transfer (a favourite stunt in the 1920s was a transfer from aircraft to aircraft, or other moving vehicles). A Fokker Trimotor also appears.

== Reception ==
Although concentrating on the aviation aspects of the production, aviation film historian James M. Farmer in Celluloid Wings: The Impact of Movies on Aviation (1984), characterized The Hurricane Express as a lightweight formula melodrama.

Like many other serials, after the conclusion of the serial, The Hurricane Express was re-edited into a feature film version which eliminated approximately two-thirds of the original serial footage. Almost no footage from the middle chapters of the serial were used. Although one of the "poverty row" studios, Mascot was important to Wayne's career and he went on to make two more serials for the studio. In The Hurricane Express, Wayne does most of his own stunt work, which solidified him as a bona fide action star.

== See also ==
- John Wayne filmography
- List of American films of 1932
- List of film serials by year
- List of film serials by studio

Preceded by The Last of the Mohicans (1932)	Mascot Serial; The Hurricane Express(1932)	Succeeded by The Devil Horse (1932)
