= Vultures of the Sea =

1928 film

- Directed by: Richard Thorpe
- Written by: William P. Burt; Wyndham Gittens
- Produced by: Nat Levine
- Starring: Johnnie Walker; Shirley Mason; Boris Karloff
- Distributed by: Mascot Pictures
- Release date: August 1, 1928
- Running time: 10 episodes
- Country: United States
- Language: Silent with English intertitles

Vultures of the Sea is a 1928 American adventure film serial directed by Richard Thorpe. The film is considered to be lost. A still exists of Boris Karloff in his makeup as "Grouchy".

== Plot ==
When a man is falsely convicted and sentenced to die for a murder committed aboard a ship, the man's son gets a job as a crewman to discover the real killer and clear his father's name.

== Cast ==
- Johnnie Walker
- Shirley Mason
- Tom Santschi
- Frank Hagney
- Boris Karloff - Grouchy
- Horace B. Carpenter (unconfirmed)
- George Magrill
- Joseph Bennett
- Arthur Dewey
- Joe Mack (as Joseph Mack)
- J. P. Lockney (as John P. Lockney)
- Lafe McKee
- Leo D. Maloney
- Tom Mintz
- Jack Perrin
