= The Fatal Warning =

1929 film

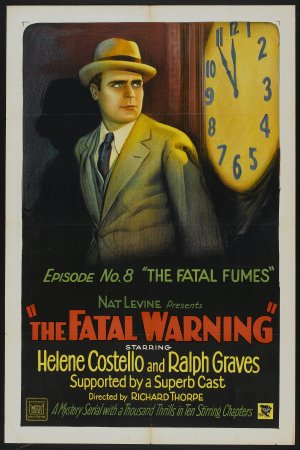
- Film poster
- Directed by: Richard Thorpe
- Written by: Wyndham Gittens
- Produced by: Nat Levine
- Starring: Helene Costello; Ralph Graves; Boris Karloff
- Distributed by: Mascot Pictures
- Release date: February 15, 1929
- Running time: 10 episodes
- Country: United States
- Language: Silent with English intertitles

The Fatal Warning is a 1929 mystery silent film serial directed by Richard Thorpe for Mascot. Wyndham Gittens wrote the screenplay, based on his own original plot idea. It co-starred an early appearance of Boris Karloff as "Mullins". The film is considered to be a lost film.

== Plot ==
After William Rogers, a bank executive, disappears, he is charged with embezzling money from the bank. But his daughter Dorothy asks her criminologist friend Russell Thorne to help her find her missing father and restore his good name.

== Cast ==
- Helene Costello as Dorothy Rogers
- Ralph Graves as Russell Thorne
- George Periolat as William Rogers
- Phillips Smalley as Leonard Taylor
- Boris Karloff as Mullins
- Lloyd Whitlock as Norman Brooks
- Syd Crossley as Dawson
- Thomas G. Lingham as John Harman
- Symona Boniface as Marie Jordan
- Martha Mattox as Mrs. Charles Peterson
- Gertrude Astor

== Chapter Titles ==
[1] “The Fatal Warning,” released 15 February 1929
[2] “The Phantom Flyer,” released 22 February 1929
[3] “The Crash of Doom,” released 1 March 1929
[4] “The Pit of Peril,” released 8 March 1929
[5] “The Clutching Hand,” released 15 March 1929
[6] “Into Thin Air,” released 22 March 1929
[7] “The House of Horror,” released 29 March 1929
[8] “The Fatal Fumes,” released 5 April 1929
[9] “By Whose Hand,” released 12 April 1929
[10] “Unmasked," released 17 April 1929

== See also ==
- List of lost films
