= Isle of Sunken Gold =

1927 film

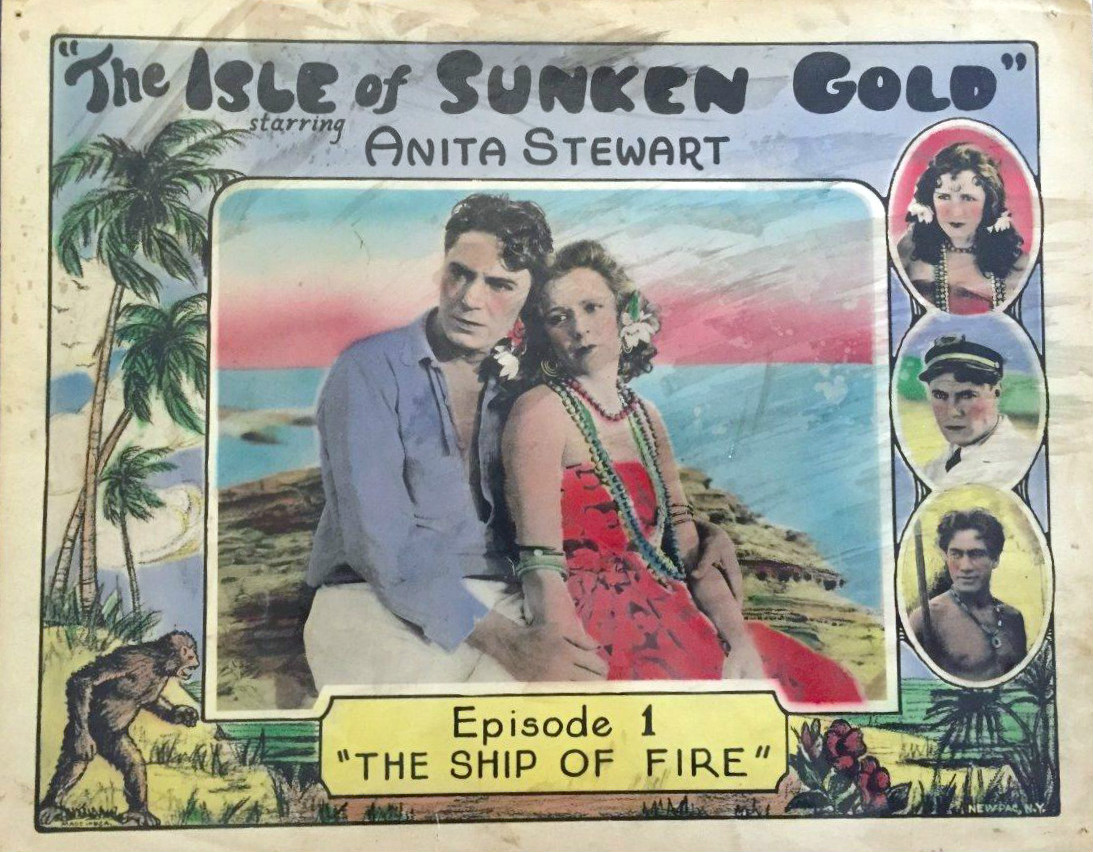
- Lobby card
- Directed by: Harry S. Webb
- Produced by: Nat Levine
- Starring: Anita Stewart; Duke Kahanamoku
- Distributed by: Mascot Pictures
- Release date: September 1, 1927
- Running time: 10 episodes
- Country: United States
- Language: Silent (English intertitles)

Isle of Sunken Gold is a 1927 American silent adventure film serial directed by Harry S. Webb. The film was long considered to be lost, however, chapters 4, 5, and 6 and reel 1 of chapter 7 were recently discovered in a European archive and retranslated back into English.

== Plot ==
A ship captain gets a hold of half of a map leading to a treasure buried on an island in the South Seas. The ruler of the island, a beautiful princess, has the other half of the map, and the two join forces to battle a gang of pirates and a group of islanders who don't want anyone to get the treasure. It is discovered in a cave guarded by a ferocious fanged ape named Kong

== Cast ==
- Anita Stewart as Princess Kala of Tafofu
- Duke Kahanamoku as Lono
- Bruce Gordon as Tod Lorre, captain of the Roamer
- Evangeline Russell as Lua
- Curtis 'Snowball' McHenry as Possum
- Jack P. Pierce (credited as John Pierce)

== Chapter titles ==
1. Isle of Sunken Gold
2. Trapped in Mid-Air
3. Engulfed by the Sea
4. The Volcano's Pit
5. The Hulk of Death
6. The Prey of Sharks
7. Fire of Revenge
8. The Battle of Canoes
9. Trapped by the Ape
10. The Devil Ape's Secret
