= The Vanishing West =

1928 film

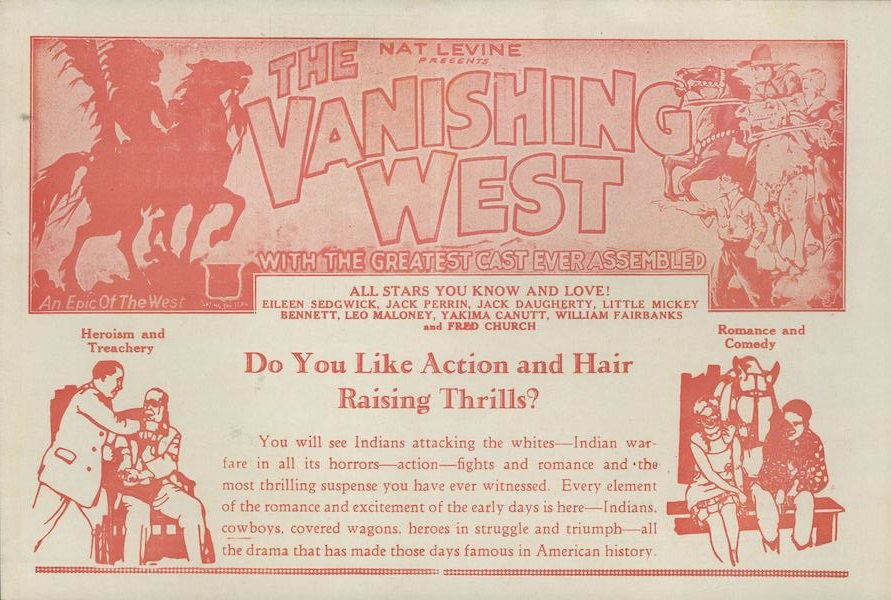
- Film poster
- Directed by: Richard Thorpe
- Written by: Wyndham Gittens
- Produced by: Nat Levine
- Starring: Jack Perrin; Eileen Sedgwick
- Distributed by: Mascot
- Release date: October 15, 1928
- Running time: 10 episodes
- Country: United States
- Languages: Silent; English intertitles

The Vanishing West is a 1928 American silent Western film serial directed by Richard Thorpe. The film is considered to be lost.

== Cast ==
- Jack Perrin as Jack Marvin
- Eileen Sedgwick as Betty Kincaid
- Jack Dougherty as Jim Marvin (as Jack Daugherty)
- Yakima Canutt as Steve Marvin
- Leo D. Maloney as Jack Trent
- William Fairbanks as Long Collins
- Mickey Bennett as Wally Lee (as Little Mickey Bennett)
- Helen Gibson as Mrs. Kincaid
- Bob Burns as Robert Lee
- Fred Church
- Harry Lorraine

== See also ==
- List of film serials
- List of film serials by studio
