= King of the Wild =

1931 film

- Directed by: B. Reeves Eason; Richard Thorpe; Lionel Backus (asst.); Theodore Joos (asst.)
- Written by: Wyndham Gittens; Ford Beebe
- Produced by: Nat Levine
- Starring: Walter Miller; Nora Lane; Dorothy Christy; Tom Santschi; Boris Karloff; Arthur McLaglen; Mischa Auer
- Cinematography: Benjamin H. Kline; Edward A. Kull
- Music by: Lee Zahler
- Distributed by: Mascot Pictures
- Release date: May 1, 1931
- Running time: 12 chapters (248 min)
- Country: United States
- Language: English

King of the Wild is a 1931 American pre-Code Mascot movie serial. The complete serial is available on DVD from Alpha Video.

A seven-reel feature version of the serial was later released in South America under the title Bimi.

== Plot ==
Robert Grant, framed for a coup in the Indian country of Ranjapur, escapes from prison to Africa in search of the real villains. Here he meets Sheik Mustapha (Boris Karloff), who has evidence to clear him and the location of a secret diamond mine.

== Cast ==
- Walter Miller as Robert Grant, American escapee from Ranjapur
- Nora Lane as Muriel Armitage, Tom Armitage's sister
- Dorothy Christy as Mrs LaSalle
- Tom Santschi as Harris, Villainous Animal trapper
- Boris Karloff as Mustapha, an African sheikh
- Arthur McLaglen as Bimi, the Ape man
- Carroll Nye as Tom Armitage, Muriel's brother who knows the location of a secret diamond mine
- Victor Potel as Peterson
- Albert DeWinton as Cyril Wainwright
- Martha Lalande as Mrs Colby
- Mischa Auer as Dakka, an escaped lunatic
- Lafe McKee as Officer

== Production ==
The stars of King of the Wild were originally intended to be Harry Carey and Edwina Booth, but filming on the MGM film Trader Horn (1931) went over-schedule, forcing Mascot to recast the serial with Walter Miller and Nora Lane instead.

Also appearing in the serial was real-life explorer Albert DeWinton. He later went after explorer Percy Fawcett, who had disappeared in Brazil several years earlier. DeWinton also disappeared in the Amazon in early 1934 and was presumed dead. Bimi, the Ape Man, was played by actor Victor McLaglen's brother Arthur, and Mischa Auer plays an escaped lunatic named Dakka.

King of the Wild is sometimes misreported as an alternate title for the serial King of the Kongo, which also co-starred Boris Karloff, but they are two different serials.

== Chapter titles ==
1. Man Eaters
2. Tiger of Destiny
3. The Avenging Horde
4. Secret of the Volcano
5. Pit of Peril
6. Creeping Doom
7. Sealed Lips
8. Jaws of the Jungle
9. Door of Dread
10. Leopard's Lair
11. The Fire of the Gods
12. Jungle Justice

_{Source:}

== See also ==
- Boris Karloff filmography
- List of film serials by year
- List of film serials by studio

Preceded by The Phantom of the West (1931)	Mascot Serial; King of the Wild (1931)	Succeeded by The Vanishing Legion (1931)
