= The Lightning Warrior =

1931 film

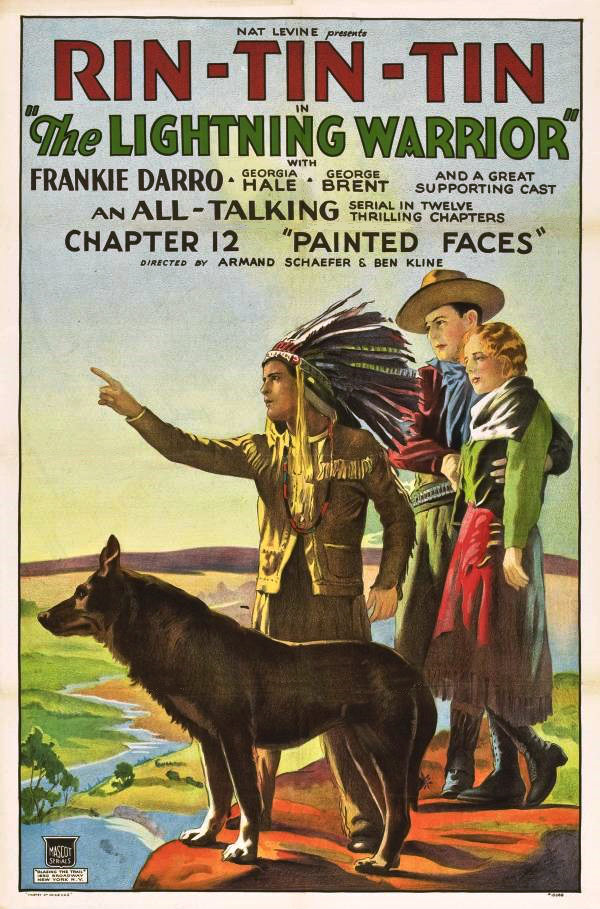
- Poster of chapter 12
- Directed by: Benjamin H. Kline; Armand Schaefer
- Written by: Ford Beebe; Wyndham Gittens; Colbert Clark
- Produced by: Nat Levine
- Starring: Rin Tin Tin; Frankie Darro; Hayden Stevenson; George Brent; Pat O'Malley; Georgia Hale; Theodore Lorch
- Cinematography: Tom Galligan; Ernest Miller; William Nobles
- Edited by: Wyndham Gittens; Ray Snyder
- Music by: Lee Zahler
- Distributed by: Mascot Pictures
- Release date: December 1, 1931
- Running time: 12 chapters (250 min)
- Country: United States
- Language: English

The Lightning Warrior is a 1931 American Pre-Code Mascot Western movie serial starring Rin Tin Tin in his last role. It is regarded as one of the better Mascot serials. A number of the production's outdoor action sequences were filmed on the rocky Iverson Movie Ranch in Chatsworth, California, known for its huge sandstone boulders and widely recognized as the most heavily filmed outdoor shooting location in the history of the movies. Released in December 1931, this was the last movie of the original Rin Tin Tin, as he died in August 1932, being replaced that same year by Rin Tin Tin Jr.

The film also marked the final film role for actress Georgia Hale before she retired from making films that same year, though she lived 55 more years after retiring.

== Plot ==
The Wolfman, a mysterious masked figure, is leading an Indian uprising to drive local settlers off their land. The Wolfman kills Jimmy Carter's father and Alan Scott's brother, which leads the two heroes and Alan's dog Rinty to hunt down and defeat the villain.

== Cast ==
- Rin Tin Tin as "Rinty", a dog known as The Lightning Warrior to the local Indians
- Frankie Darro as Jimmy Carter
- George Brent as Alan Scott, government agent
- Patrick H. O'Malley, Jr. as Sheriff Brown
- Georgia Hale as Dianne
- Theodore Lorch as Pierre La Farge
- Lafe McKee as John Hayden
- Frank Brownlee as Angus McDonald
- Bob Kortman as Wells, henchman
- Dick Dickinson as Adams, henchman
- Yakima Canutt as Ken Davis and Deputy
- Frank Lanning as Indian George/ Jim

== Chapter titles ==
1. Drums of Doom
2. The Wolf Man
3. Empty Saddles
4. Flaming Arrows
5. The Invisible Enemy
6. The Fatal Name
7. The Ordeal of Fire
8. The Man Who Knew
9. Traitor's Hour
10. Secret of the Cave
11. Red Shadows
12. Painted Faces

_{Source:}

Preceded by The Galloping Ghost (1931)	Mascot Serial; The Lightning Warrior(1931)	Succeeded by The Shadow of the Eagle (1931)
