= Tom Dugan (actor, born 1889) =

Irish actor (1889–1955)

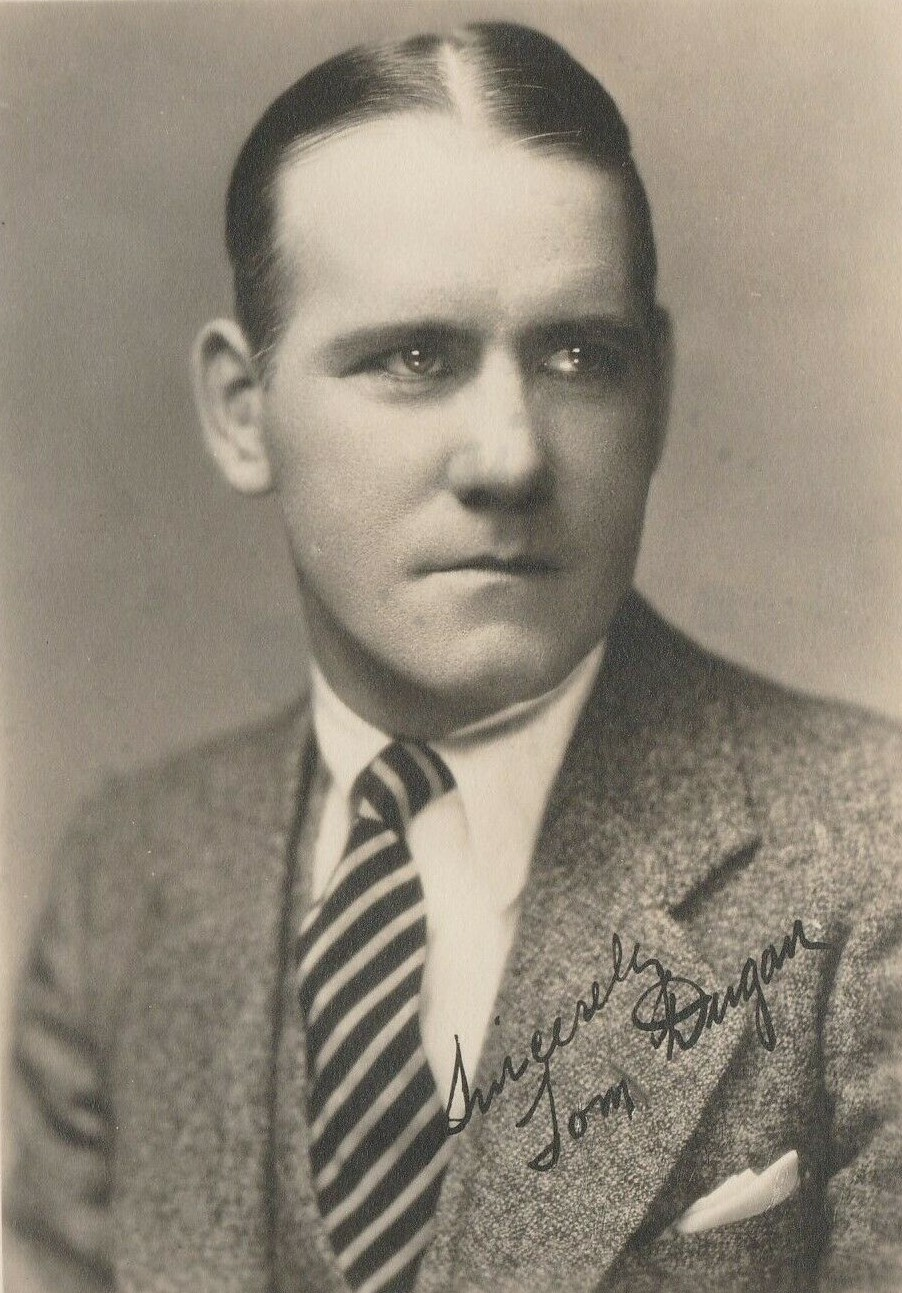
- Dugan in the 1930s
- Born: 1 January 1889; Dublin, Ireland
- Died: 7 March 1955 (aged 66); Redlands, California, U.S.
- Resting place: San Fernando Mission Cemetery
- Occupation: Actor
- Years active: 1927–1955
- Spouses: Marie Engle; Marie Raymond

Tom Dugan (1 January 1889 – 7 March 1955) was an Irish actor. He appeared in more than 260 films between 1927 and 1955. He was born in Dublin, Ireland and died in Redlands, California, after injuries sustained in a road accident.

== Life and career ==
At an early age, Tom Dugan's family moved to Philadelphia where he was educated at the Philadelphia High School. After leaving school, he tried three trades (shoe cutting, neck tie cutting and paper hanging) in quick succession but he had a good tenor voice, so he decided on show business. He appeared in a travelling medicine show, then a minstrel troupe before going on stage. He was a headliner for the Keith Circuit in America for several years. He also played in musical comedies in New York City and in vaudeville theatres like Earl Carroll's Vanities. He eventually became a Broadway comedian.

Dugan appeared in nearly 270 films between 1927 and 1955 and had also some television roles near the end of his life. He supported comedians like Charley Chase and appeared in Lights of New York (1928), the first all-talking picture. Dugan also worked as an actor and perhaps also writer for the Hal Roach studios in the mid-1930s. He mostly played small roles, often as an Irish cop, gangster or cab driver. His best film role was perhaps the Polish actor Bronski who disguises himself as Adolf Hitler in Ernst Lubitsch's To Be or Not to Be (1942).

== Death ==
Dugan died 7 March 1955 in Redlands, California. His remains are interred at San Fernando Mission Cemetery in North Hollywood.

== Partial filmography ==
- What Every Girl Should Know (1927)
- The Kid Sister (1927)
- The Swell-Head (1927)
- By Whose Hand? (1927)
- Sharp Shooters (1928)
- Dressed to Kill (1928)
- The Midnight Taxi (1928)
- Melody of Love (1928) as Lefty (credited as Tommy Dugan)
- Shadows of the Night (1928)
- The Barker (1928)
- The Million Dollar Collar (1929)
- Sonny Boy (1929)
- Drag (1929) as Charlie Parker
- The Bad One (1930)
- The Phantom of the West (1931)
- The Vanishing Legion (1931)
- The Galloping Ghost (1931 serial)
- Big City Blues (1932) as Red
- The Pride of the Legion (1932)
- Palooka (1934)
- The Gilded Lily (1935)
- Princess O'Hara (1935)
- The Affair of Susan (1935)
- The Case of the Missing Man (1935)
- Three Kids and a Queen (1935)
- Divot Diggers (1936)
- Pennies from Heaven (1936)
- Wife vs. Secretary (1936) as Finney
- Nobody's Baby (1937)
- True Confession (1937)
- Youth Takes a Fling (1938)
- There's That Woman Again (1938)
- The House of Fear (1939)
- Missing Evidence (1939)
- Mystery of the White Room (1939)
- Laugh It Off (1939)
- The Fighting 69th (1940)
- Cross-Country Romance (1940)
- Half a Sinner (1940)
- So You Won't Talk (1940)
- The Boys from Syracuse (1940)
- Meet the Stewarts (1942)
- To Be or Not to Be (1942)
- Yankee Doodle Dandy (1942)
- Bataan (1943)
- In Society (1944)
- Accomplice (1946)
- The Shadow Returns (1946) as the cab driver Shrevvy
- Bringing Up Father (1946)
- The Pilgrim Lady (1947)
- Half Past Midnight (1948)
- On the Town (1949)
- Take Me Out to the Ball Game (1949)
- The Lemon Drop Kid (1951)
- Crashout (1955)
