= Frank Lanning =

American actor (1872–1945)

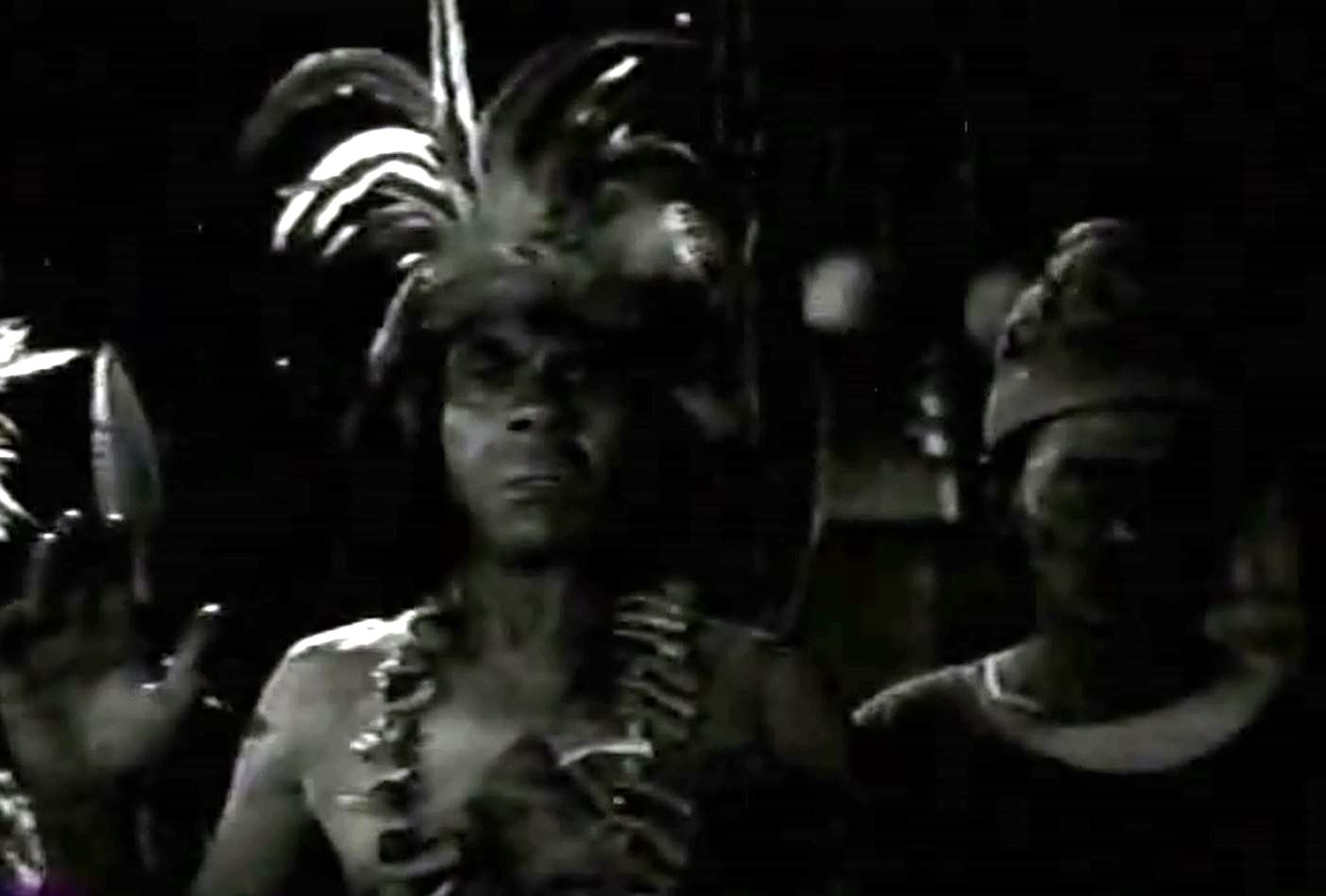
- Lanning in makeup as a witch doctor in Tarzan the Tiger (1929)
- Born: August 14, 1872; Marion, Iowa, US
- Died: June 17, 1945 (aged 72); Los Angeles, California, US
- Occupation: Actor
- Years active: 1910–1934

Frank Lanning (August 14, 1872 – June 17, 1945) was an American actor of the silent era. He appeared in 84 films between 1910 and 1934. He was born in Marion, Iowa and died in Los Angeles, California. Lanning's film debut came in The Mended Lute. He acted for Biograph, Kalem, Universal and Pathe studios.

== Selected filmography ==
- My Hero (1912)
- The Severed Hand (1914)
- Buckshot John (1915)
- The Three Godfathers (1916)
- The Little Patriot (1917)
- Bull's Eye (1917)
- The Lion's Claws (1918)
- Huck and Tom (1918) - Injun Joe
- Bare-Fisted Gallagher (1919)
- Haunting Shadows (1919)
- Desert Gold (1919)
- The Prince and Betty (1919)
- A Sagebrush Hamlet (1919)
- Daredevil Jack (1920)
- That Girl Montana (1921)
- Cameron of the Royal Mounted (1921)
- Out of the Silent North (1922)
- Another Man's Boots (1922)
- Step on It! (1922)
- Drifting (1923)
- The Remittance Woman (1923)
- Ten Scars Make a Man (1924)
- Ace of Spades (1925)
- The Fighting Ranger (1925)
- Stand and Deliver (1928)
- Rough Romance (1930)
- The Lone Defender (1930)
- Temple Tower (1930)
- The Lightning Warrior (1931)
- The Phantom of the West (1931)
- The Fighting Fool (1932)
