= Ladies Crave Excitement =

1935 film by Nick Grinde

- Directed by: Nick Grinde
- Written by: John Rathmell (story); Wellyn Totman (screenplay); Scott Darling (screenplay)
- Produced by: Nat Levine (producer)
- Starring: Norman Foster; Evalyn Knapp; Esther Ralston
- Cinematography: Ernest Miller; William Nobles
- Edited by: Ray Curtiss
- Production company: Mascot Pictures
- Distributed by: Republic Pictures (1935–67); CBS (1967–85); Viacom (1985–present)
- Release date: 1935
- Running time: 73 minutes
- Country: United States
- Language: English

Ladies Crave Excitement is a 1935 American action–comedy drama film released by Mascot Pictures, directed by Nick Grinde and starring Norman Foster, Evalyn Knapp and Esther Ralston.

== Plot ==
Don Phelan, the ace newsreel reporter, falls in love with Wilma Howell, the daughter of the owner of another newsreel company that is a bitter rival of the one Don works for. The rivalry, with cameramen jostling each other out of the way, acts of sabotage, and reporters fighting to get the 'scoop', does not bode well for the romance.

== Cast ==
- Norman Foster as Don Phelan
- Evalyn Knapp as Wilma Howell
- Esther Ralston as Miss Winkler
- Eric Linden as Bob Starke
- Purnell Pratt as Amos Starke
- Irene Franklin as Victoria (Vi)
- Emma Dunn as Mrs. Phelan
- Gilbert Emery as J. Fenton Howell
- Russell Hicks as Bert Taylor
- Christian Rub as Lars Swenson
- Francis McDonald as Terry
- Matt McHugh as Johnson
- Jason Robards Sr. as Nick
- Syd Saylor as Flynn
- George "Gabby" Hayes as Dan McCloskey
- Max Wagner as Pat

== Release ==
Ladies Crave Excitement was released on DVD on July 26, 2010. The film was again released on DVD on August 27, 2013.
