= The King of the Kongo =

1929 film

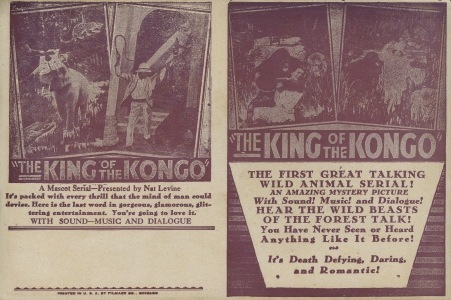
- Directed by: Richard Thorpe
- Written by: Harry Sinclair Drago; Wyndham Gittens
- Produced by: Nat Levine
- Starring: Jacqueline Logan; Walter Miller; Richard Tucker; Boris Karloff
- Cinematography: Ernest Laszlo; Ray Ries
- Distributed by: Mascot Pictures
- Release date: August 9, 1929
- Running time: 10 chapters (213 min)
- Country: United States
- Languages: Sound (Part-Talking); English

The King of the Kongo (1929) is a Mascot film serial starring Jacqueline Logan and Walter Miller, directed by Richard Thorpe. The film featured an early Boris Karloff as "Scarface Macklin", Robert Frazer as the native chieftain and Joe Bonomo playing the gorilla.

It was the first serial to have sound, although only partial sound ("Part Talking") rather than the later (and now standard) "All-Talking" productions with complete sound. The first episode was a "three reeler" with the remaining nine episodes being "two reelers" (approximately 15 minutes per film reel).

== Plot ==
Diana Martin and Secret Service agent Larry Trent are searching the jungle for their missing relatives (her father and his brother). The plot involves a gang of ivory smugglers, a gorilla and a lost treasure hidden in the jungle.

== Cast ==
- Jacqueline Logan as Diana Martin
- Walter Miller as Larry Trent, Secret Service Agent
- Richard Tucker as Chief of the Secret Service
- Boris Karloff as Scarface Macklin
- Larry Steers as Jack Drake
- Harry Todd as Commodore
- Richard Neill as Prisoner
- Lafe McKee as Trader John
- J.P. Lockney as Priest. (some sources list Lockney as Leckray due to poor video transfers. This is an error in transcription.)
- William P. Burt as Mooney
- J. Gordon Russell as Derelict
- Robert Frazer as Native chieftain
- Ruth Davis as Poppy
- Joe Bonomo as the Gorilla

== Music ==
The serial featured a theme song entitled “Love Thoughts of You” which was composed by Lois Leeson (words) and Lee Zahler (music).

== Production ==
The King of the Kongo was the first film serial to have a sound element. Larger serial-producing studios (for example, Pathé and Universal Studios) were reluctant to change from silent film production (although Universal released their own Part-Talking serial, Tarzan the Tiger, later that year) while smaller studios could not afford to do so. Legend has it that producer and studio owner Nat Levine carried the sound discs in his lap from Los Angeles to New York City, by train and aeroplane, for them to be safely developed. For financial reasons, these discs could not have been repaired or replaced if anything had gone wrong. This was two years after the first Part-Talking film, The Jazz Singer (1927), had been released and a year after the first "All-Talking" film, Lights of New York (1928).

Despite an announcement that two different versions of this serial would be released, (a "Part Talking" version and a silent version intended for theatres not yet equipped for sound), no evidence exists for a silent version being released. All current (as of 2024) transfers of the film are the sound version but without the sound. Some prints have the sound credits excised.

King of the Kongo is sometimes misreported as an alternate title for the 1931 serial King of the Wild, which also starred Boris Karloff.

=== Stunts ===
- Joe Bonomo
- Yakima Canutt

== Chapter titles ==
1. Into the Unknown
2. Terrors of the Jungle
3. Temple of Beasts
4. Gorilla Warfare
5. Danger in the Dark
6. The Fight at Lions Pit
7. The Fatal Moment
8. Sentenced to Death
9. Desperate Chances
10. Jungle Justice

== Preservation status ==
Chapter 1 (three reels) • Into the Unknown (reel 1 and 2 missing, only reel 3 exists)
Chapter 2 (two reels) • Terrors of the Jungle (both reels exist)
Chapter 3 (two reels) • Temple of Beasts (no sound exists)
Chapter 4 (two reels) • Gorilla Warfare (both reels survive)
Chapter 5 (two reels) • Danger in the Dark (sound discs for both reels survive) restoration was finished in 2013
Chapter 6 (two reels) • The Fight at Lions Pit (sound discs for both reels survive) National Film Preservation Foundation project began fall 2014 finished 2015
Chapter 7 (two reels) • The Fatal Moment (sound disc for reel 2 survives)
Chapter 8 (two reels) • Sentenced to Death (both reels survive)
Chapter 9 (two reels) • Desperate Choices (sound disc for reel 1 only survives)
Chapter 10 (two reels) • Jungle Justice (National Film Preservation Foundation restoration project began as of June 2015, finished 2016)

In 2011, collector/historian Eric Grayson, owner of a 16mm silent print, restored the sound to several scenes of the film, using discs from Ron Hutchinson's Vitaphone Project. These reels were Chap 5 r1, Chap 5 r2, and Chap 6 r2. The results of some of the talking scenes have been posted on YouTube.

In 2012, a Kickstarter successfully helped fund a restoration of Chapter 5. National Film Preservation Foundation grant is underway for Chapter 10. A grant for Chapter 6 was issued in June 2014.

In 2019, preservationist Grayson initiated a massive search for surviving materials and has an updated restoration scheduled for 2024. This includes mostly 35mm footage and a few 16mm inserts plus all of the surviving discs.

In 2024, the film's restoration was completed, and it has been released on DVD and dual-layer Blu-Ray discs.
