= Another Man's Boots =

1922 film

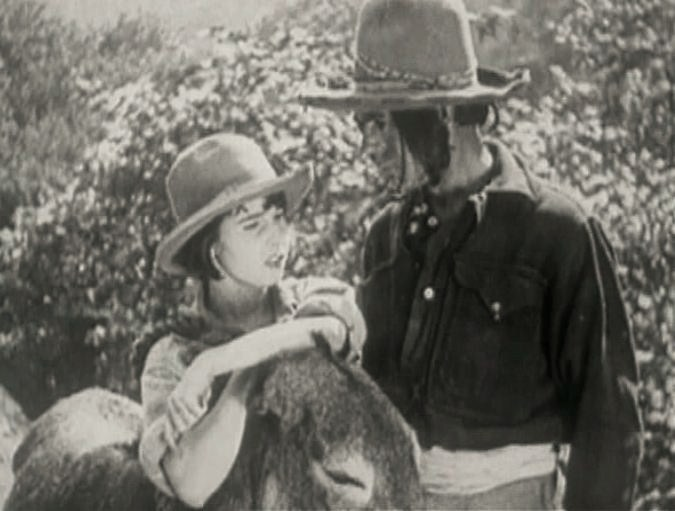
- Directed by: William James Craft
- Written by: Daniel F. Whitcomb
- Produced by: Ivor McFadden
- Starring: Francis Ford; Bob Kortman; Frank Lanning
- Cinematography: Edward T. Estabrook
- Production company: Ivor McFadden Productions
- Distributed by: Anchor Film Distributors; Aywon Film Corporation
- Release date: September 1, 1922
- Running time: 60 minutes
- Country: United States
- Languages: Silent; English intertitles

Another Man's Boots is a 1922 American silent Western film directed by William James Craft and starring Francis Ford, Bob Kortman and Frank Lanning.

== Cast ==
- Francis Ford as The Stranger
- Elvira Weil as Nell Hadley
- Harry Smith as Ned Hadley
- Bob Kortman as Sly Stevens
- Frank Lanning as Injun Jim
