= Mascot Pictures =

Former American film company

Mascot Pictures Corporation
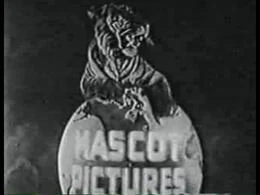
- Industry: Film studio
- Founded: 1927; 99 years ago
- Defunct: 1935; 91 years ago
- Fate: Merged
- Successor: Republic Pictures
- Headquarters: First: Santa Monica Boulevard, Los Angeles, United States; Later: Studio City, Los Angeles, California, United States
- Key people: Nat Levine
- Products: The King of the Kongo (1929); The Shadow of the Eagle (1932); In Old Santa Fe (1934); The Phantom Empire (1935)

Mascot Pictures Corporation was an American film company of the 1920s and 1930s, best known for producing and distributing film serials and B-westerns. Mascot was formed in 1927 by film producer Nat Levine. In 1935, it merged with several other companies to form Republic Pictures.

Mascot's serial The King of the Kongo (1929) was the first serial to include sound, beating Universal Studios by several months.

The company's logo featured a roaring tiger resting on top of a model of the planet Earth.

Initially renting its equipment and facilities, the company grew successful enough by 1933 to acquire Sennett Studios, which is now CBS Studio Center.

== Early years ==
Mascot was created in 1927 by Nat Levine, a former personal secretary to Marcus Loew, after the success of his independent serial The Silent Flyer (1926).

In the beginning the company operated out of the upstairs offices of a contractor's business on Santa Monica Boulevard. It rented all of its equipment and facilities.

In 1929 the studio made serial history with the production of The King of the Kongo. This was the first serial, from any production company, to be made with sound. Mascot's first all-talking production was The Phantom of the West (1931)

== Sennett Studios ==
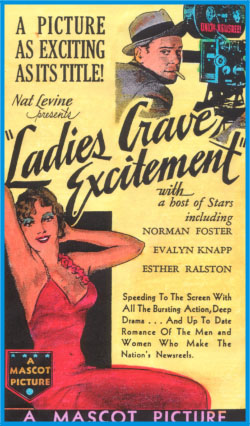
It was from small Mascot Pictures, but Ladies Crave Excitement (1935) still packed "Bursting Action, Deep Drama...And Up To Date Romance" into its 73 minutes. Supervising editor Joseph H. Lewis would soon become a prolific director of B westerns. His later film noirs, including the independently produced Gun Crazy (1949), would become renowned.

By 1933 Mascot was successful enough to rent, and later buy, Sennett Studios, after the original owner, silent-film comedy producer-director Mack Sennett, went bankrupt because of the Great Depression. This made the company a true film studio. That studio lot is now CBS Studio Center.

Mascot was responsible for the popularity of the concept of the "singing cowboy" and the "musical western". In 1935 the studio produced The Phantom Empire with the then untried Gene Autry as the lead.

== Republic Pictures ==
Mascot's film laboratory was Consolidated Film Industries. In 1935, under pressure from that company's owner, Herbert Yates, Mascot was merged by CFI with Monogram Pictures, Liberty Pictures, Chesterfield Pictures and Invincible Pictures to form Republic Pictures, a production-distribution company designed by Yates. Levine was designated head of the serial and B-Western arm of the company, and the Mascot studio facilities and contract personnel became Republic assets as part of the merger. Within two years, however, along with most of his colleagues at Republic who had owned other companies, Levine found himself in a disagreeable situation and left Republic. With only the Mascot name and film library remaining in his possession, Levine found employment elsewhere in the motion picture industry and Mascot Pictures survived only through reissues of its sound serials and a single, new feature film edited from the "Phantom Empire" serial, released in 1940.

== Legacy ==
Several careers began at Mascot Pictures.

=== Actors ===
- Gene Autry
- Smiley Burnette
- John Wayne

=== Production crew ===
- Ford Beebe
- B. Reeves Eason
- Joseph Kane
- The Lydecker brothers
- William Witney

== Filmography ==
- Men with Steel Faces (1940) (feature version of "The Phantom Empire")
- Doughnuts and Society (1936)
- The Fighting Marines (1935)
- Harmony Lane (1935)
- Confidential (1935)
- Waterfront Lady (1935)
- Streamline Express (1935)
- The Adventures of Rex and Rinty (1935)
- Ladies Crave Excitement (1935)
- The Headline Woman (1935)
- One Frightened Night (1935)
- The Miracle Rider (1935)
- Behind the Green Lights (1935)
- The Phantom Empire (1935) (film serial)
- Little Men (1934)
- Mystery Mountain (1934)
- The Marines Are Coming (1934)
- In Old Santa Fe (1934)
- Crimson Romance (1934)
- Young and Beautiful (1934)
- The Law of the Wild (1934)
- Burn 'Em Up Barnes (1934) (feature version of the serial)
- Burn 'Em Up Barnes (1934) (film serial)
- The Lost Jungle (1934) (feature variation of the serial)
- The Lost Jungle (1934) (film serial)
- The Lone Defender (1934) (feature version of same-title serial)
- The Mystery Squadron (1933)
- The Wolf Dog (1933)
- Laughing at Life (1933)
- Fighting with Kit Carson (1933)
- The Whispering Shadow (1933)
- The Three Musketeers (1933)
- The Devil Horse (1932)
- The Pride of the Legion (1932)
- The Hurricane Express (1932)
- The Last of the Mohicans (1932)
- The Shadow of the Eagle (1932)
- The Lightning Warrior (1931)
- The Galloping Ghost (1931)
- The Vanishing Legion (1931)
- King of the Wild (1931)
- The Phantom of the West (1931)
- The Lone Defender (1930) (film serial)
- The King of the Kongo (1929)
- The Fatal Warning (1929)
- Vultures of the Sea (1928)
- The Vanishing West (1928)
- Heroes of the Wild (1927)
- Isle of Sunken Gold (1927)
- The Golden Stallion (1927)

Additionally,

- The Silent Flyer (1926) was created by Nat Levine but was not in the strict sense of the word a Mascot production.

== See also ==
- List of film serials by studio includes a list of serials produced by Mascot.
