= Poverty Row =

Slang term used in Hollywood to refer to small film production companies

Poverty Row was a group of small Hollywood studios that produced B movies from the 1920s to the 1950s, typically with much smaller budgets and lower production values than those of the major studios. Although many of these studios were based in the vicinity of Gower Street in Hollywood, the term does not necessarily relate to any specific physical location.

Many of the films produced by Poverty Row studios were those of series in the Western, comedy, adventure and crime genres.

== Studios ==
While some Poverty Row studios had a brief existence, releasing only a few films, others operated in a manner similar to that of major film studios such as Metro-Goldwyn-Mayer, Warner Bros. Pictures and Paramount Pictures, but on a much smaller scale.

Some Poverty Row studios were able to maintain permanent lots and recognizable standing sets, maintained cast and crew under contracts, and produce a more varied output than other smaller firms.

The primary Poverty Row studios included:

- CBC Productions, founded by Harry Cohn, was considered a Poverty Row studio from 1919 until its reorganization in 1924 as Columbia Pictures.
- Tiffany Pictures was in operation from 1921 through 1932 as both a production company (about 90 films) and a distributor.
- Mascot Pictures was formed in 1927 by Nat Levine and merged into Republic Pictures in 1935.
- Larry Darmour Productions flourished from 1927 through the 1930s, mainly on the popularity of its Mickey McGuire short-film series starring Mickey Rooney. Darmour was also the principal producer for Majestic Pictures until 1935.
- Monogram Pictures was created in 1931 by the merger of Sono Art-World Wide Pictures with W. Ray Johnston's Rayart. After the attempted 1935 merger of Monogram into Republic Pictures, Johnston took Monogram independent again, and in the following decades produced films ranging from college/teen musicals starring popular swing bands to classic stories such as Oliver Twist and the final films of Kay Francis. Monogram evolved, in relatively stable financial condition, into Allied Artists in 1953. Monogram/Allied released the 48 feature films of the Bowery Boys.
- Republic Pictures was organized in 1935 when Herbert J. Yates combined six other established Poverty Row companies (Monogram, Mascot Pictures, Liberty Pictures, Majestic Pictures, Chesterfield Pictures and Invincible Films) with his Consolidated Film Laboratories. Republic began by releasing serial shorts and Westerns with Gene Autry in the 1930s before eventually riding the success of eventual superstars Roy Rogers and John Wayne. Republic's The Quiet Man (1952) was nominated for the Academy Award for Best Picture, and John Ford won the Oscar for Best Director.
- Grand National Films Inc. was organized in 1936 with some significant talent (James Cagney and director Charles Lamont) but could not survive without its own distribution channel. It folded in 1939 after having released approximately 100 films.
- Producers Releasing Corporation (PRC) emerged in 1939 and lasted until 1946, when it was absorbed into Eagle-Lion Films. PRC presented a steady output of Westerns and gangster films with occasional high spots, such as Edgar G. Ulmer's film noir classic Detour (1945) and Minstrel Man (1944), which was nominated for two Academy Awards for its music.

=== Lower-tier studios ===
The smallest studios, including Tiffany Pictures, Victory Pictures, Mascot Pictures, and Chesterfield Pictures, often packaged and released films from independent producers, British "quota quickie" films or exploitation films such as Hitler, Beast of Berlin to supplement their own limited production capacity. Producers would sometimes create a new studio when their former ones failed, such as Harry S. Webb and Bernard B. Ray's Reliable Pictures and Metropolitan Pictures.

Some organizations such as Astor Pictures and Realart Pictures began by obtaining the rights to rerelease older films from other studios before producing their own films.

== Decline ==
The breakup of the studio system (and its block-booking practice, which left independent theaters eager for content from the Poverty Row studios) following 1948's United States v. Paramount Pictures, Inc. decision and the advent of television were among the factors that led to the decline and ultimate disappearance of the traditional Poverty Row studios, although small and independent studios continue to exist through the present day.

== See also ==
- Independent film
- Vulgar auteurism
- Auteur theory
- Roger Corman
- French New Wave
- Classical Hollywood cinema
- Grindhouse
