= Wyndham Gittens =

West Indian screenwriter

- Born: 7 February 1885; Barbados, West Indies
- Died: 18 June 1967 (aged 82); Dunedin, Florida
- Years active: 1917-1966

Wyndham Gittens (7 February 1885 – 18 June 1967) was a West Indian screenwriter. He wrote for more than 60 films between 1917 and 1966. He was born in Barbados, West Indies and died in Dunedin, Florida.

== Selected filmography ==
- Pardon My Gun (1942)
- Tim Tyler's Luck (1937)
- The Lost Jungle (1934)
- The Mystery Squadron (1933)
- The Three Musketeers (1933)
- The Devil Horse (1932)
- The Hurricane Express (1932)
- The Last of the Mohicans (1932)
- The Shadow of the Eagle (1932)
- The Lightning Warrior (1931)
- The Galloping Ghost (1931)
- King of the Wild (1931)
- The Phantom of the West (1931)
- The Lone Defender (1930)
- The King of the Kongo (1929)
- The Fatal Warning (1929)
- The Red Sword (1929)
- Hey Rube! (1928)
- The Vanishing West (1928)
- Crashing Through (1928)
- Vultures of the Sea (1928)
- Stranded (1927)
- Pretty Clothes (1927)
- Western Pluck (1926)
- The Lodge in the Wilderness (1926)
- Out of the West (1926)
- The Power of the Weak (1926)
- The Everlasting Whisper (1925)
- Greater Than a Crown (1925)
- The Measure of a Man (1924)
- The Sunset Trail (1924)
- Alimony (1924)
- Desert Driven (1923)
- Itching Palms (1923)
- Can a Woman Love Twice? (1923)
