= Masked villain =

Character type

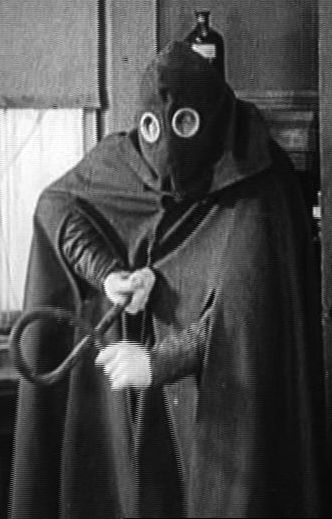
The Hooded Terror in the Pearl White serial The House of Hate, which defined the "masked mystery villain" type

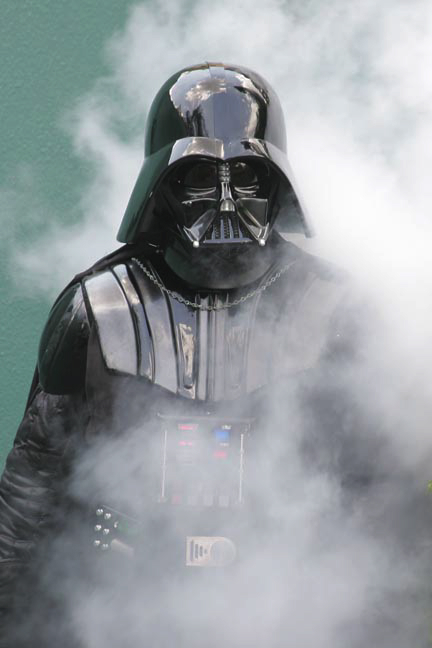
Darth Vader, the masked villain from Star Wars

A masked villain, also seen as masked mystery villain, is a stock character in genre fiction. It was developed and popularized in movie serials, beginning with The Hooded Terror in The House of Hate, (1918) the first fully-costumed mystery villain of the movies, and frequently used in the adventure stories of pulp magazines and sound-era movie serials in the early twentieth century, as well as postmodern horror films where the character "hides in order to claim unsuspecting victims". They can also appear in crime fiction to add to the atmosphere of suspense and suspicion. It is used to engage the readers or viewers by keeping them guessing just as the characters are, and suspension by drawing on the fear of the unknown. The "Mask" need not be literal (although it often is), referring more to the subterfuge involved.

The masked villain originated in early 20th-century French literature and cinema. Key early examples include Zigomar, created by Léon Sazie in 1909, a masked criminal who led the "Gang of Z" and inspired three films directed by Victorin Jasset: Zigomar, roi des voleurs, Zigomar contre Nick Carter and Zigomar, peau d'anguille. Another major figure is Fantômas, created by Marcel Allain and Pierre Souvestre in 1911, a master of disguise who became a cultural icon through five silent serials directed by Louis Feuillade: Fantômas (1913), Juve contre Fantômas (1913), Le Mort Qui Tue (1913), Fantômas contre Fantômas (1914), and Le Faux Magistrat (1914).

They are the often main antagonist of the story, often acting behind the scenes with henchmen confronting the protagonists directly. Usually, the protagonists must discover the villain's true identity before they can be defeated. Often, the villain will turn out to be either one of the protagonists themselves, or a significant supporting character. The author may give the viewer or reader clues, with many red herrings, as to the villain's identity - sometime as the characters find them and sometimes for the audience alone. However, the identity is not usually revealed to the audience before it is revealed to the characters of the story.

== Examples ==
=== Serials ===
- "The Clutching Hand" in The Exploits of Elaine
- "The Hooded Terror" in The House of Hate
- Fur-coated Mystery Man in The Phantom Foe
- "Monsieur X" in The Trail of the Octopus
- "The Frog" in The Mark of the Frog
- "The Wolf Devil" in Queen of the Northwoods
- "The Hidden Hand" in The Hidden Hand
- "The Iron Claw" in The Iron Claw
- "The Faceless Terror" in The Fatal Fortune
- "The Purple Shadow" in The Purple Riders
- "The Claw" in The Mystery Rider
- "The Iron Hand" in The Invisible Hand
- "Phantom Face" in The Mystery Mind
- "The Black Hawk" in The Air Mail Mystery
- "The Scorpion" in Blake of Scotland Yard
- "The Tiger Shark" in The Fighting Marines.
- "The Ghost" in Dick Tracy vs. Crime, Inc. - "One of the most memorable of all the masked villains of serials" according to William C. Cline.
- "The Dragon" in Ace Drummond.
- "The Lightning" in The Fighting Devil Dogs.
- "The Skull" in Deadwood Dick
- "Don Del Oro" in Zorro's Fighting Legion
- "The Wasp" in Mandrake the Magician.
- "The Scorpion" in Adventures of Captain Marvel.
- "The Octopus" in The Spider's Web
- "The Gargoyle" in The Spider Returns.
- "The Crimson Ghost" in The Crimson Ghost
- "The Wasp" in Mandrake the Magician
- "Captain Mephisto" in Manhunt of Mystery Island.
- "The Rattler" in Mystery Mountain
- "The Wizard" in Batman and Robin.
- "The Master Key" in The Master Key.

The following villains were not actually "masked" but remained hidden from view:

- "The Voice" in The Vanishing Legion
- "The Black Ace" in The Mystery Squadron.
- "The Lame One" in Dick Tracy.
- "The Black Tiger" in The Shadow.
- "Mr. M" in The Mysterious Mr. M.
- "Dr. Vulcan" in King of the Rocket Men.

=== Television ===
- "The Hooded Claw" from The Perils of Penelope Pitstop.

=== Films ===
- Michael Myers from Halloween
- Ghostface from Scream
- Darth Vader from Star Wars
- Yokai (Robert Callaghan) from Big Hero 6
