= Joe Bonomo (strongman) =

American bodybuilder and actor

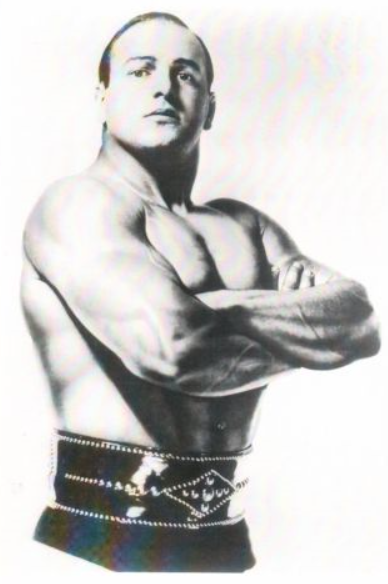
- An image of Bonomo published in 1954
- Born: Joseph Bonomo; December 25, 1901; Coney Island, Brooklyn, New York, U.S.
- Died: March 28, 1978 (aged 76); Los Angeles, California, U.S.
- Occupations: Stunt performer, strongman

Joseph Bonomo (December 25, 1901 – March 28, 1978) was a famous American weightlifter, strongman, film stunt performer, and actor.

== Biography ==
Bonomo was born to Esther and Albert Bonomo, Sephardic Jewish immigrants from Smyrna, Turkey. His mother emigrated to the United States in 1890 or 1893 and his father in 1894; both lived for a time in France before sailing to their respective emigrations. As a child Bonomo built himself into a strongman, winning the "Mr. Modern Apollo" contest of 1921, for which the prizes included a ten-week movie contract.

He began as a stunt double, soon doubling for Lon Chaney in The Hunchback of Notre Dame and then playing a variety of roles. He lost the role of Tarzan in Tarzan the Mighty when he injured himself before shooting.

Bonomo took interest in dieting and physical culture. His 1954 book Power Plus Cable Course was endorsed by Bernarr Macfadden. In 1951 he authored Calorie Counter and Control Guide, which sold 17 million copies.

== Selected filmography ==
Year	Title	Role	Notes
1924	Wolves of the North	Pierre DuPree	Serial, lost film
1926	The Flaming Frontier	Rain in the Face	Silent feature
1929	The King of the Kongo	Gorilla	Serial "talkie"
1929	Courtin' Wildcats	Gorilla	
1932	The Lone Trail	Jed	

== Selected publications ==
- Bonomo Power Plus System of Physical Development (1944)
- How To Relax (1943)
- Building Body Power (1950)
- Calorie Counter and Control Guide (1951)
- Mighty Joe Bonomo's Famous 3-week Speed Course in Super-strength Dynamic Energy, Greater Health (1952)
- The Famous Joe Bonomo 'Power-Plus' Cable-Course (1954)
- The Scientific & Easy Way to Gain Weight (1958)
- The Strongman: Pictorial Autobiography of Joe Bonomo (1968)
