= Nat Levine =

American film producer (1899–1989)

- Born: July 26, 1899; New York City
- Died: August 6, 1989 (aged 90); Woodland Hills, Los Angeles
- Occupation: Film producer
- Years active: 1921–1946
- Spouse: Frances Levine

Nat Levine (July 26, 1899 – August 6, 1989), was an American film producer. He produced 105 films between 1921 and 1946. Born in New York City, he entered the film industry as an accountant for Metro Pictures and became personal secretary to Metro head Marcus Loew.

He moved to Hollywood in 1925, setting out to produce his own movies. He had made many friends in film distribution, and arranged with them to release his films on the independent state's rights market. He called his company Mascot Pictures.

== Mascot ==
Levine knew that theater managers, especially in smaller towns, liked movies that emphasized action. He filled that demand with western and dramatic serials. Levine was well aware that small-town exhibitors were slow to convert to the new talking-picture technology, so he concentrated on silent pictures until the end of the silent-film era. Levine released his 1929 serial The King of the Kongo in both talking and silent versions. He hired Walt Disney's recording equipment for his early sound films, until he was able to afford his own.

Levine was careful with his production budgets, filming largely outdoors to save money on constructing sets, and hiring mostly less expensive silent-film actors whose names still meant something at the boxoffice. When Warner Brothers dropped its enormously popular Rin Tin Tin series of silent features, Nat Levine signed the dog and his trainer, Lee Duncan, to work in Mascot serials. Levine also hired silent-era western stars, including Ken Maynard, Harry Carey, and Tom Tyler.

Mascot entered the feature-film market in 1932 with Pride of the Legion, an adventure story with the young Victor Jory. The company continued to produce lightweight features with bygone names like William Haines and Erich von Stroheim, but its main output was still action serials. One of Mascot's leading stars was Frankie Darro, an athletic young actor who was very popular with audiences. Levine valued Darro so highly that he raised Darro's salary from $1,000 weekly (for The Vanishing Legion) to $2,000 (for The Lightning Warrior), then to $3,000 (for The Devil Horse), $4,000 (for The Wolf Dog), and $5,000 (for Burn 'Em Up Barnes).

Darro's high salaries were highly unusual for the notoriously cheap Levine. "He was a promoter and a money man, but you have to give him credit for picking the right things to make and the right men to create them for him," recalled screenwriter Maurice Geraghty. "I was paid $25 a week and worked six days a week, 8:30 to 6:00, and I mean worked. It was a real sweatshop operation, but jobs were hard to come by at the time... Offices were located in a cement factory, [and] across the street was a cemetery. You had a feeling that it wouldn't be long before you ended up there." Levine's biggest coup was luring cowboy superstar Tom Mix out of retirement to star in a deluxe serial, The Miracle Rider (1935). Levine was justifiably proud of this film, which grossed more than one million dollars—exceptional returns for a serial. Levine used some of the profits to expand his operation, buying the former Mack Sennett studio.

Herbert Yates, who owned a film laboratory that serviced many small studios, wanted to combine these studios into one powerful company, with himself at the helm. Mascot was one of Yates's clients, and it merged into Yates's new Republic Pictures in 1935. Republic used Mascot's physical plant as its new base of operations, using Mascot's personnel. Levine, accustomed to being his own boss, was uncomfortable with the new setup, and Yates bought out Levine and his interests for one million dollars.

Levine was reckless with the windfall, and after a brief association with Metro-Goldwyn-Mayer in 1938, he raised some cash by reissuing a few of his more popular serials, still using the Mascot brand name, in 1940.

Levine became the manager of the Picfair Theater on Pico and Fairfax in West Los Angeles until the early 1960's when he moved on to the Rolling Hills Theatre in Torrance, California, the same movie theater where four of its employees were murdered during the February 11, 1973 screenings of Disney's “The World's Greatest Athlete” and “Now You See Him, Now You Don't”. Levine held this position through the 1960s. He became a resident of the Motion Picture Home in Woodland Hills, California, where he died in 1989.

== Selected filmography ==
- Rose of the Desert (1925)
- The Silent Flyer (1926)
- The Golden Stallion (1927)
- Isle of Sunken Gold (1927)
- Heroes of the Wild (1927)
- Vultures of the Sea (1928)
- The Vanishing West (1928)
- The Fatal Warning (1929)
- The King of the Kongo (1929)
- The Devil Horse (1932)
- The Pride of the Legion (1932)
- The Law of the Wild (1934)
- Little Men (1934)
- 1,000 Dollars a Minute (1935)
- Ladies Crave Excitement (1935)
- Behind the Green Lights (1935)
- Ticket to Paradise (1936)
- The House of a Thousand Candles (1936)
