= Jimmy and Sally =

1933 film

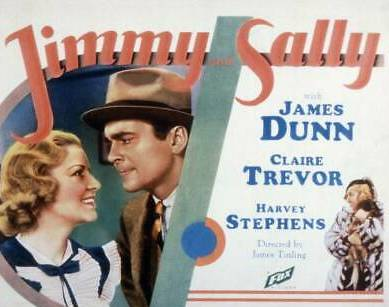
- Lobby card
- Directed by: James Tinling
- Screenplay by: Paul Schofield; Marguerite Roberts; William Conselman (dialogue)
- Starring: James Dunn; Claire Trevor; Harvey Stephens; Lya Lys; Jed Prouty; Gloria Roy
- Cinematography: Joseph A. Valentine
- Edited by: Ralph Dixon
- Music by: Arthur Lange
- Production company: Fox Film Corporation
- Distributed by: Fox Film Corporation
- Release date: November 24, 1933
- Running time: 65 minutes
- Country: United States
- Language: English

Jimmy and Sally is a 1933 American pre-Code comedy-drama film directed by James Tinling and written by Paul Schofield and Marguerite Roberts with additional dialogue by William Conselman. Starring James Dunn, Claire Trevor, Harvey Stephens, Lya Lys, and Jed Prouty, the story concerns a self-centered publicist who relies on his secretary's creativity but takes her affection for him for granted. After a series of publicity blunders and being fired several times, he humbly acknowledges that he is the one responsible for letting their relationship collapse. Though she has accepted a marriage proposal from another publicist in his absence, the girl still loves him, and ultimately chooses him.

== Plot ==
Jimmy O'Connor works as a publicist for the Marlowe Meat Packing Company. He relies heavily on the creativity of his secretary, Sally Johnson, to come up with good slogans. Sally lives across the hall of the same apartment house as Jimmy and she likes him, although he is rather self-absorbed. When Sally develops the slogan "Eat Meat and Rule the World", Jimmy presents it to Mr. Marlowe as his own. Marlowe allows Jimmy to go ahead and set up a publicity stunt involving a circus act in the Marlowe department store window. The stunt flops when the elephant goes berserk after being spooked by a mouse. Marlowe fires Jimmy, but re-hires him the following day as the publicist for his mistress, Pola Wenski, a cabaret singer, since Jimmy has found out about their relationship. When Jimmy takes Pola, with whom he is slightly infatuated, back to her house to celebrate, he passes out on her couch.

Sally is infuriated when she meets up with Jimmy in the morning. But Jimmy is more interested in her hearing the story he has come up for the singer, that she has fallen in love with an unnamed gangster who is unaware of her affections. The story brings hordes of gangsters to Pola's club and Pola falls for Slug Morgan. Morgan's cronies proceed to eject Jimmy and Marlowe from the club and Marlowe fires Jimmy for the second time. Jimmy decides to open his own publicist agency, and Marlowe hires Sally to fill Jimmy's position. She is much more successful than Jimmy ever was, and when she visits Jimmy in his office and sees him struggling, she offers him an account, but Jimmy is too proud to accept. Sally chides Jimmy for his ingratitude and self-absorption, and dumps him for good.

Jimmy moves to the West Coast and begins working for another meat packing company. Meanwhile, another Marlowe publicist, Ralph Andrews, asks Sally to marry him and she accepts, even though she is still fond of Jimmy. One of Jimmy's coworkers encourages him to return to the East Coast and try to win Sally back. Jimmy returns to Marlowe and asks him for a job, whereupon Marlow tells him to see the head of the publicity department—Sally. Humbled, Jimmy admits to Sally how wrongly he behaved and promises to regain her respect. He sees she is wearing an engagement ring, but Sally tells him not to give up so easily. Then he asks her to marry him, and she accepts. They embrace as Sally's supposed fiancé Ralph enters the office and sees them.

== Cast ==
- James Dunn as Jimmy O'Connor
- Claire Trevor as Sally Johnson
- Harvey Stephens as Ralph Andrews
- Lya Lys as Pola Wenski
- Jed Prouty as E. W. Marlowe
- Gloria Roy as Shirley
- Alma Lloyd as Mary
- John Arledge as Joe

== Production ==
=== Development ===
The film was based on the unpublished story "Tough Guy" by Mauri Grashin and James Seymour. According to the AFI Catalog of Feature Films, the script by Paul Schofield and Marguerite Roberts was enhanced by dialogue from William Conselman and additional writing from Charlotte Miller.

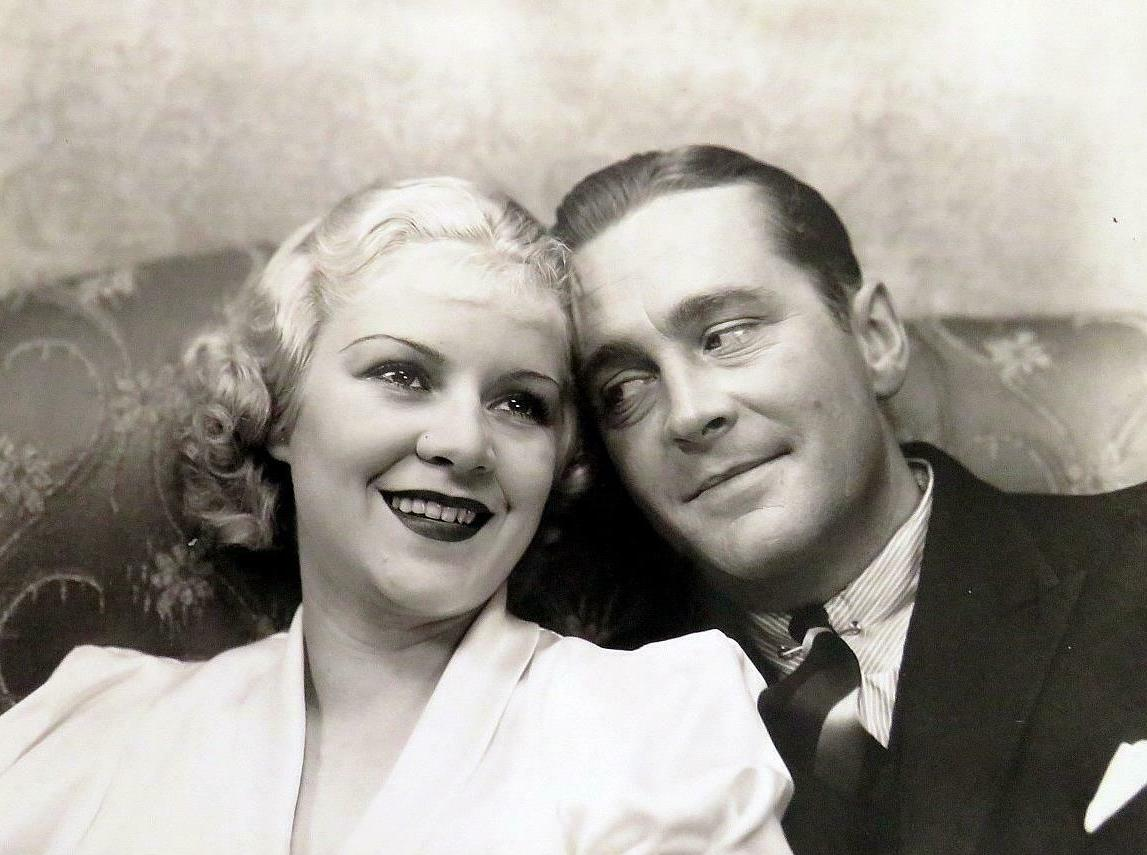
Publicity photo of Claire Trevor and James Dunn

=== Casting ===
Capitalizing on the success of Bad Girl (1931), which propelled James Dunn (making his film debut) and Sally Eilers to overnight stardom, Fox Film sought to team the duo in more projects. Dunn and Eilers went on to star in Over the Hill (1931), Dance Team (1932), Sailor's Luck (1933), and Hold Me Tight (1933). Jimmy and Sally was written and titled especially for the popular duo. But when Eilers bowed out of the project, Fox gave her part to Claire Trevor. This was Trevor's feature film debut. The chemistry between Dunn and Trevor proved so successful that Fox paired them again in two 1934 films—Hold That Girl and Baby Take a Bow.

=== Music ===
Songs in the film—"It's the Irish in Me", "You're My Thrill", and "Eat Marlowe's Meats"—were composed by Jay Gorney with lyrics by Sidney Clare. Dunn's rendition of "It's the Irish in Me" marks the first time he sings on screen.

=== Filming ===
According to a news report, director Tinling kept Dunn happy during the filming by leaving a piano at the back of the set, where Dunn practiced playing and singing between takes.

== Release ==
The film was released on November 24, 1933. The runtime has been listed alternately as 65 or 68 minutes.

== Critical reception ==
A contemporary review cited by Trevor biographer Derek Sculthorpe called the film "[a] highly diverting piece of nonsense with no pretensions to be anything else", but noted that the presence of Dunn and Trevor "was sufficient to ensure the success of any film, for both these young people have an irresistible sense of fun and delightful stage personalities". Another review, hinting at the film's release at the height of the Great Depression, called it "Guaranteed to drive away the 1933 blues". The Indianapolis Star described it as "another of those luxurious romances of youth which have been a favorite product of Hollywood for many years", concluding, "As a comedy, 'Jimmy and Sally' is easy to take. … The bill is the type many will like". The Montreal Gazette called it "an amusing little programme picture", adding: "There is some excellent comedy in this film along the lines of satire on the publicity man whose great schemes always overreach the mark but provide plenty of excitement in so doing". The Courier-Journal wrote: "'Jimmy and Sally' is a story of a youth's battle to find himself and is not, in its premise, unlike many a story of youth. It is filled with situations to thwart the cock-sure young man and some of these incidents are amusing".

The Sydney Morning Herald, however, tagged the film for a lack of novelty, with the humorous scenes depicting Jimmy's schemes going wrong as the bright spots in "a mass of otherwise dull material".

Numerous reviews complimented Trevor on her feature film debut. The Courier-Journal called her "a pretty girl who has a very attractive voice". Dunn's persona, however, was seen as less appealing than the happy-go-lucky style that had made him a fan favorite in his previous films. The New York Daily News, which gave the film 2 stars, wrote: "Jimmy isn't such a bright ray of sunshine as he has been in other pictures, as he is made to think so much of himself and his ability to get on that he saddens his sweetheart and maddens his friends".

Sculthorpe commended William Conselman's "wise-cracking dialogue" for improving the quality of the script. Conselman, a former newspaperman, polished his ear for colloquialisms by eavesdropping on people's conversations at prizefights and dances.

== Sources ==
- Matheson, Sue (2019). The John Ford Encyclopedia. Rowman & Littlefield. ISBN 978-1-538-10382-1.
- Sculthorpe, Derek (2018). Claire Trevor: The Life and Films of the Queen of Noir. McFarland. ISBN 978-1-476-63069-4.
