= Bad Girl (1931 film) =

1931 film

- Theatrical release poster
- Directed by: Frank Borzage
- Written by: Edwin J. Burke (continuity & dialogue); Rudolf Sieber (uncredited)
- Based on: Bad Girl (1928 novel) by Viña Delmar; Bad Girl (1930 play) by Viña Delmar and Brian Marlowe
- Starring: Sally Eilers; James Dunn; Minna Gombell
- Cinematography: Chester A. Lyons
- Edited by: Margaret Clancey
- Production company: Fox Film Corporation
- Distributed by: Fox Film Corporation
- Release date: August 14, 1931
- Running time: 90 minutes
- Country: United States
- Language: English
- Budget: Under $100,000
- Box office: $1.1 million

Bad Girl is a 1931 American pre-Code drama film directed by Frank Borzage and starring Sally Eilers, James Dunn, and Minna Gombell. The screenplay was adapted by Edwin J. Burke from the 1928 novel by Viña Delmar and the 1930 play by Delmar and Brian Marlowe. The plot follows the courtship and marriage of two young, working-class people and the misunderstandings that result from their not having learned to trust and communicate with one another. The film propelled then-unknown actors Eilers and Dunn to stardom. It was nominated for three Academy Awards, including Best Picture, and won for Best Director and Best Adapted Screenplay.

== Plot ==
Dorothy Haley and Edna Driggs are store models, first seen in bridal clothes at their job one afternoon. After work Dorothy fends off her boss, who wants to take her for a ride, by claiming to be married to a prizefighter. The girls then go to Coney Island. On the return steamboat trip, the women make a bet about attracting a certain man's attention, and Dorothy proceeds to annoy him by playing a ukulele. This man is Eddie Collins; after his initial grouchy reaction to the women, he slowly forms a connection with Dorothy and sees her home. Eddie works in a radio shop and dreams of having a shop on his own, for which he has been saving.

Eddie forgets to show up for a date and Dorothy angrily finds him in his boarding house, where they remain together until 4 a.m. Eddie walks her home but she is afraid to go up, fearing the reaction of her abusive elder brother who is her guardian. Eddie proposes marriage as a solution and Dorothy joyfully accepts. Her brother calls her a tramp and evicts her from her home. Dorothy suffers some anxiety the next day when Eddie seems to have disappeared; he then turns up, having made arrangements for a new place to live, and the two are happily married.

Ten weeks later, Dorothy confides to Edna that she is pregnant, but is reluctant to tell Eddie the news when she learns that he is ready to open his new shop, an expensive commitment. Instead she tells Eddie that she would like to return to work, to which he objects. Wrongly guessing that she really wants a larger place to live, Eddie cancels his plans for the shop in favor of a lavish new apartment and the purchase of new furnishings, increasing Dorothy's worries. By the time Eddie finally finds out he is to become a father, the two mutually misunderstand that the other is unhappy about the pregnancy, resulting in a strain on their marriage. The strain intensifies when Eddie stays out late at night to earn extra money as a boxer to pay for the services of Dr. Burgess, the best obstetrician in the city, all without telling Dorothy. Eddie is being pummeled in one of these prizefights while Dorothy leaves for the hospital; when he returns and Dorothy sees him bruised and bandaged, she assumes he was in a barroom brawl and turns her back on him. After their son is born, Dorothy plans to leave Eddie; however, before that can happen the misunderstanding is cleared up, and the couple returns home together to raise their child.

== Cast ==
- Sally Eilers as Dorothy Haley
- James Dunn as Eddie Collins
- Minna Gombell as Edna Driggs

Uncredited:

- Frank Austin as upstairs tenement neighbor
- Irving Bacon as expectant father
- Frank Darien as Lathrop
- Jesse De Vorska as expectant father
- Paul Fix as nervous expectant father
- Guy Edward Hearn as male nurse
- Aggie Herring as seamstress
- Claude King as Dr. Burgess
- Louis Natheaux as Mr. Thompson
- Sarah Padden as Mrs. Gardner
- William Pawley as Jim Haley
- Charles Sullivan as Mike the prizefighter
- William Watson as Floyd

== Themes ==
The Depression-era backdrop of poverty and deprivation tinges the characters' preoccupation with and fears about earning money and paying for their needs.

== Production ==
=== Development ===
The development of Bad Girl from the novel and play into a film required extensive purging and rewriting of the material to conform to the dictates of the Hays Office. A November 16, 1928, memo from the Hays Office put a damper on the whole production, stating: "'Bad Girl' might be produced as a sex hygiene picture called 'Motherhood.' It is simply the story of girl who is 'bad' for one night, marries the boy the next day, and then has a baby". The memo described the novel as a "nauseating story of doctors, illnesses, etc." and as "cheap and shoddy writing about cheap and shoddy people". Several studios besides Fox were interested in the rights to the novel and play, including Pathé, Metro-Goldwyn-Mayer, Paramount Pictures, Universal Pictures, and Columbia Pictures, but were either scared off by the Hays Office's warnings of extensive cuts by the censor or the difficulty of dramatizing the novel's main subject of obstetrics. Between 1929 and 1930, the Hays Office advised numerous producers not to attempt an adaptation because it would be "too censorable".

Fox, however, came up with a treatment that avoided the scandalous elements of the story and smoothed over the whole issue of premarital sex which Dorothy had with Eddie during their late night in his apartment. Instead, the implications of their night together are not addressed and Eddie's proposal of marriage to save Dorothy from the shame of facing her brother at 4 a.m. comes off as spontaneous. All that remains of the provocative content of the novel is the title, Bad Girl. The script was approved by the Hays Office in May 1931 with only a small number of "relatively minor" changes.

Despite the vote of approval, Fox executives did not hold much stock in the film's commercial appeal and even Borzage refused to direct it. But Fox pressured Borzage into accepting the assignment since his contract was about to expire and was not expected to be renewed. The studio further showed its lack of enthusiasm for the project by budgeting less than $100,000 for the production and hiring unknown actors. As a result, Borzage had a "fairly free hand" in the production.

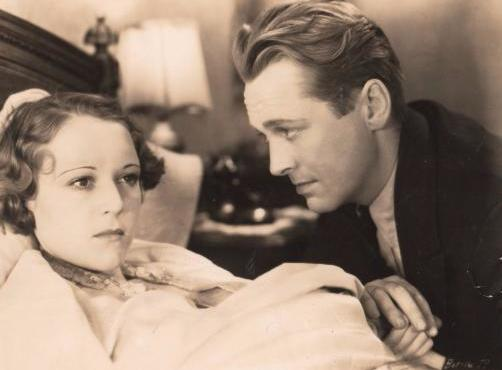
Sally Eilers and James Dunn in a scene from the film

=== Casting ===
Borzage wanted Spencer Tracy to play the lead role, but Fox would not agree to this. After seeing a screen test that New York stage actor James Dunn had done at Fox Film's Astoria Studios in Queens, Borzage chose him for the role of Eddie and Dunn was signed to a Fox contract. Dunn made his screen debut in Bad Girl. Eilers had previously appeared in Buster Keaton films as an ingénue and was known for using "the filthiest language in Hollywood", thus connecting her in some way to the title character.

=== Filming ===
Production took place between June 1 and July 4, 1931.

== Release ==
The film premiered at the Roxy Theatre in New York City on August 14, 1931, and in Los Angeles on August 25. It had its official U.S. release on September 13, 1931. The film was not released in Europe.

Stage producer Robert V. Newman filed suit against Fox and the Roxy Theatre after the New York premiere, contending that he had sold Fox the rights to the play on the condition that the film not be released before September 1. The New York Supreme Court threw out the case, stating that "no substantial damage" had been done by the earlier premiere date.

== Reception ==
=== Box office ===
Bad Girl was one of Fox's most successful releases of 1931, earning $1.1 million at the box office.

=== Critical reception ===
The Pittsburgh Post-Gazette praised the film as a modern take on contemporary life, describing it as "so human, so free from pretense and so provocatively real". According to Borzage biographer Hervé Dumont, the film surprised contemporary critics as it was "stripped of all conventional ingredients—love triangles, jealousy, sex appeal or crimes—but buoyed by the cheerful exuberance that apparently effortlessly metamorphoses a mixture of little nothings into a gem of subtlety and charm". Dumont notes that Borzage deftly circumvented anything that could be considered provocative and instead brought out the humor and sentimentality of the relationship between the main characters. Reid calls the result both realistic and romantic. A Los Angeles Times review credits Borzage as "the dominant force" behind the film, but also commends screenwriter Edwin J. Burke's dialogue "as amazingly skillful in satisfying the demand for wisecracks while retaining the quality of naturalness and always keeping in character".

James Dunn's performance was singled out by many reviews as the pivot around which the film revolves. The Baltimore Evening Sun wrote: "Without Dunn, Bad Girl would be just another movie. With him, it's something that provokes chuckles, tears, laughs, sighs and everything else that a nice little movie hopes to provoke". The Los Angeles Times called Dunn's first starring turn "triumphant", asserting that "no performance has lately equaled the impression made by this rather plain young man, who, aside from having a likable personality, scores a major hit by his ability as an actor". The Pittsburgh Post-Gazette said of Dunn: "Sincere, honest and natural, his performance is flawless". Rebutting a review that claimed any actor would have succeeded in the "sure-fire part", a Pittsburgh Post-Gazette reviewer argued:

It was a role so skillfully conceived and executed, so sympathetically played and so warm and sincere that one's natural inclination is to put the actor in this case above the role rather than the role above the actor. ... Mr. Dunn, on the other hand, created a character. It had a definite form. It breathed life. It had depth and feeling. Not for a moment were you conscious of James Dunn. You were conscious only of Eddie Collins.

The Brattleboro Reformer wrote: "James Dunn, as the sensitive, nervous, conscientious young husband in this, his first, picture gives a performance of astonishing strength. … He presents a new kind of film star and a personality of infectious charm". The scene in which Dunn as Eddie pleads with Dr. Burgess to take his wife's case was cited by the Los Angeles Times as "the equal of any of the great moments in past pictures", and by the Pittsburgh Post-Gazette as "probably the most notable work of the season".

Critics also praised the female performers. The Los Angeles Times called Sally Eilers' role "easily her best performance and it, too, is perfect". The Bratteboro Reformer commended Eilers' ability to convey a range of moods and emotions while also projecting personal charm. Minna Gombell was cited for adding "warmth and sympathy" to her characterization of the wisecracking friend.

=== Accolades ===
Bad Girl was nominated in three categories at the 5th Academy Awards, winning in two:

Award	Category	Nominee	Result
Academy Awards	Best Motion Picture	Winfield Sheehan for Fox Film	Nominated
Academy Awards	Best Director	Frank Borzage	Won
Academy Awards	Best Adapted Screenplay	Edwin J. Burke	Won

Bad Girl was named one of the ten best films of the year by Film Daily, and one of the "Ten Best Pictures of 1931" by The New York Times.

== Adaptations ==
The film spawned several adaptations. In October 1931, Fox produced a Spanish-language adaptation for the South American market titled Marido y Mujer (Husband and Wife), directed by Bert Sebell and released in 1932. Bad Boy, also starring James Dunn and directed by John G. Blystone, was released in 1935. 20th Century Fox remade the story in 1940 as Manhattan Heartbeat, starring Robert Sterling and Virginia Gilmore.

== Re-teaming Dunn and Eilers ==
Following the film's success, Fox immediately teamed Dunn and Eilers in more films together. They starred in Over the Hill (1931), Dance Team (1932), Sailor's Luck (1933), and Hold Me Tight (1933). The 1933 film Jimmy and Sally was also written and titled with the duo in mind, but after Eilers declined to play the lead, her part was given to Claire Trevor.

== Sources ==
- Dumont, Hervé (2015). Frank Borzage: The Life and Films of a Hollywood Romantic. McFarland. ISBN 978-1-476-61331-4.
- Reid, John Howard (August 2011). Silent Movies & Early Sound Films on DVD: New Expanded Edition. John Howard Reid. ISBN 978-0-557-43335-3.
- Sculthorpe, Derek (2018). Claire Trevor: The Life and Films of the Queen of Noir. McFarland. ISBN 978-1-476-63069-4.
