= Jay Gorney =

Russian-born Jewish American musical theater and film songwriter

Jay Gorney (December 12, 1896 – June 14, 1990) was an American theater and film song writer.

== Life and career ==
Gorney was born Abraham Jacob Gornetzsky on December 12, 1896, in Białystok, Russia (now part of Poland), the son of Frieda (Perlstein) and Jacob Gornetzsky. His family was Jewish. In 1906, he witnessed the Bialystok pogrom, which forced his family into hiding for nearly two weeks; they soon fled to the United States, arriving on 14 September 1906. The family settled in Detroit, Michigan, where Jacob Gornetzsky became an engineer at the newly formed Ford Motor Company. Frieda Gornetzsky bought a piano for her children. At age 14, after two years of lessons, Gorney was offered a job as a pianist at a local nickelodeon.

He worked his way through the University of Michigan (Class of 1917) and the University of Michigan Law School (Class of 1919) as a pianist. His studies were interrupted by World War I, during which he enlisted in the Navy. After graduating, he practiced law briefly before pursuing a career in music.

Gorney relocated with his wife to New York City, where he began his song writing career on Tin Pan Alley. He contributed numerous songs to musicals by the Shubert brothers. Ira Gershwin introduced Gorney to lyricist Yip Harburg, who became a frequent collaborator. The pair's most famous song was "Brother Can You Spare a Dime," based on a lullaby that Gorney learned as a child in Russia. It first appeared in the 1932 Shubert production of New Americana and became the anthem of the Great Depression.

The Gorney-Harburg writing partnership ended when Harburg had an affair with Gorney's wife, whom he subsequently married.

Gorney later wrote the song, "You're My Thrill" with lyrics by Sidney Clare. It was introduced in the film Jimmy and Sally (1933).

Gorney is credited with bringing Shirley Temple to 20th Century-Fox (then known as Fox Films). As he was leaving a viewing of her latest picture, Frolics of Youth, Gorney saw Temple dancing in the movie theater lobby. Recognizing her from the screen, he arranged for her to have a tryout for the movie Stand Up and Cheer!, which he was working on as a songwriter. The role, which featured Temple singing "Baby Take a Bow" (which was co-written by Gorney) with James Dunn, turned out to be a breakthrough role for Temple. The song would become the title for Baby Take a Bow, the first film by Fox to feature Temple in a starring role.

Gorney's second marriage was to Sondra Karyl (Kattlove), a public relations consultant. Their daughter, Karen Lynn Gorney, is an actress and dancer who was in the original cast of All My Children, and starred opposite John Travolta in Saturday Night Fever. Gorney has two sons, Dr. Roderic Gorney (with first wife Edelaine Roden) and Dan Gorney (with Sondra Karyl).

Gorney's 2005 biography, Brother, Can You Spare a Dime? The Life of Composer Jay Gorney was written by his widow Sondra.
