= Stand Up and Cheer! =

1934 film

- Directed by: Hamilton MacFadden
- Written by: Dialogue: Lew Brown; Ralph Spence; Story: Will Rogers; Philip Klein
- Produced by: Winfield Sheehan
- Starring: Warner Baxter; Madge Evans; Sylvia Froos; John Boles; James Dunn "Aunt Jemima"; Shirley Temple; Arthur Byron; Ralph Morgan; Nigel Bruce "Skins" Miller; Lucien Littlefield; Nick Foran; Mitchell & Durant; Stepin Fetchit
- Cinematography: Ernest Palmer; L. W. O'Connell
- Edited by: Margaret Clancey
- Music by: Lew Brown; Jay Gorney
- Production company: Fox Film
- Distributed by: Fox Film
- Release dates: 19 April 1934 (NYC); 4 May 1934 (US)
- Running time: 80 minutes/69 minutes (edited version)
- Country: United States
- Language: English

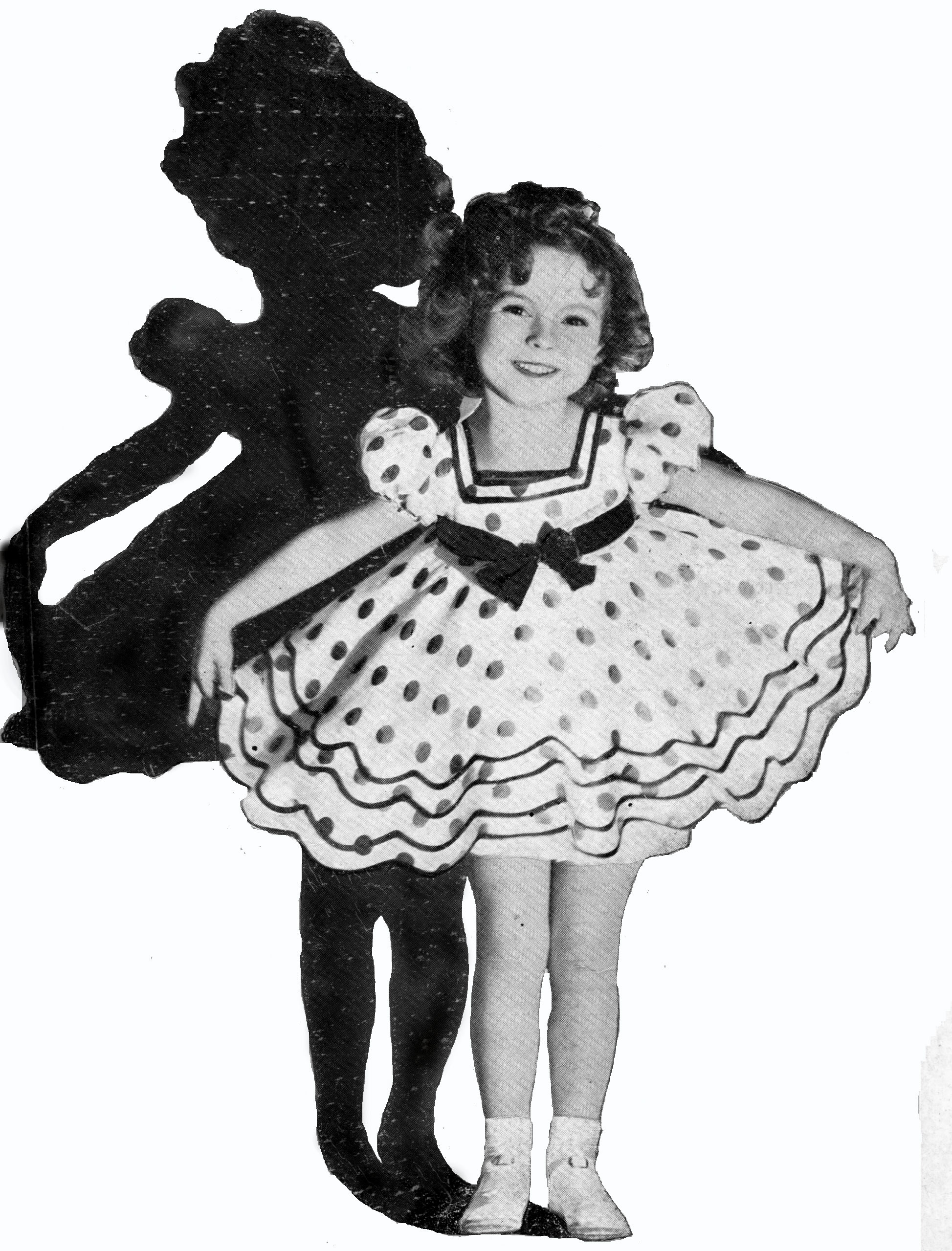
Stand Up and Cheer! made Shirley Temple a star.

Stand Up and Cheer! is a 1934 American Pre-Code musical film directed by Hamilton MacFadden. The screenplay by Lew Brown and Ralph Spence was based upon a story idea by Will Rogers and Philip Klein. The film is about efforts undertaken during the Great Depression to boost the morale of the country. It is essentially a vehicle for a string of vaudeville acts and a few musical numbers. The film is best known for providing the first big breakthrough role for legendary child actress Shirley Temple. A little known bit player before the film, by the end of the year, she appeared in 10 movies, including 4 starring roles in major feature-length films.

== Plot ==
The President of the United States decides that the true cause of the Great Depression (raging when the film was released) is a loss of "optimism" as a result of a plot by financiers and bankers who are getting rich from the Depression. The President then appoints Lawrence Cromwell as secretary for the newly created Department of Amusement. Cromwell creates an army of entertainers and sends them out across the country. Much of the action centers around Cromwell auditioning acts in his office (with interruptions from janitor "George Bernard Shaw", played by Stepin Fetchit). At the end, as a musical production number breaks forth, Cromwell looks out of his office window and sees the Depression literally, instantaneously lift.

== Cast ==
- Warner Baxter as Lawrence Cromwell
- Madge Evans as Mary Adams
- Shirley Temple as Shirley Dugan
- James Dunn as Jimmy Dugan
- Nigel Bruce as Eustis Dinwiddle
- Ralph Morgan as Secretary to President
- Stepin Fetchit as "George Bernard Shaw"
- Tess Gardella as Aunt Jemima
- Scotty Beckett as Auditioning Boy
- John Boles as himself
- Dick Foran as himself (billed as Nick)

== Production ==
During production, the film was known as "Fox Follies". Perhaps the most memorable scene in the movie was the song and dance number by James Dunn and Shirley Temple titled "Baby Take a Bow". Temple, who was signed to a $150/week contract initially guaranteed for just two weeks while the film was in full production, did not have enough time to learn the dance routine for the film and instead used a routine she learned from Meglin's. Dunn then learned the routine from her. In recording the sound track for the song, her voice accidentally cracked on the last note, but the producers actually liked it and kept it in. Before filming the dance routine, she slipped and fell while walking in, cutting her head. To remedy this, her mother covered the cut with a spit curl. As filming of the dance number started, Temple's potential quickly became apparent. By the time she was finished, she was brought straight into Fox Film offices and had her contract extended to a year with a seven-year option. The number became so popular that it would serve as the title to her next film, Baby Take a Bow, also starring Dunn.

== Reception ==
=== Critical reception ===
Mordaunt Hall of The New York Times wrote that the film "often comes close to a conception of what a modern Gilbert and Sullivan opus might be. It is true that there are several intrusive numbers which have little to do with the bright pivotal idea, but they have the virtue of being good entertainment." John Mosher of The New Yorker reviewed it as mediocre, writing it had "a few good numbers and a lot of very dreary libretto work." Film Daily reported "Despite a weakness in construction that has left it with a few air pockets, this musical jamboree has several highlights that will suffice to satisfy the patrons and make them pass the word around." It added that Shirley Temple "just about steals the show and leaves the customers hungry for more of her." "Richly satiric, the story introduces hilarious types and presents a delightfully mad picture of Washington", wrote the New York Daily Mirror. The New York Herald Tribune wrote that it was "successful neither as musical comedy nor hilarious fantasy, but it must be granted certain pleasant features. Amazingly enough, one of them is a child actress." The New York Daily News wrote that although it "was designed to wipe away our fears and blues over these hard times by insisting that the depression is over, I'm afraid it is going to have just the opposite effect. Little Shirley Temple earned the only burst of spontaneous applause."

The film was given a strong endorsement by Variety, especially the work of "newcomer" Shirley Temple, whom they cited as the film's "unofficial star." Although modern scholars often point to the film as an example of typical Great Depression entertainment, Variety expressed reservations about its theme. "This musical is a hodge-podge principally handicapped by a national depression premise. Americans now like to think of themselves in the light of being on the upturn and having rounded that long-awaited corner, so Cheer's plot motivation is basically questionable [and] open to debate."

== Releases ==
The film premiered April 19, 1934 at Radio City Music Hall in New York City.

The film was a box office dismal for Fox.

Eleven minutes of footage were deleted for modern home video release, most of it racial in nature. In 2009, the film was available on both videocassette and DVD in the original black-and-white version and a computer-colorized version of the original. Some versions included theatrical trailers and other special features.

== Merchandise ==
The polka-dot dress worn by Shirley Temple in her song and dance number with Dunn served as the model of the dress used on the first Shirley Temple dolls made by toy manufacturer Ideal in 1934. In 1958, Temple's television show, Shirley Temple's Storybook went into production. At the time, she persuaded various manufacturers to release ancillary merchandise including the Baby Take a Bow polka-dot dress (Edwards 233).

== See also ==
Documentaries about the Depression years featuring clips from this film:

- Brother, Can You Spare a Dime? (1975)
- America, Lost and Found (1979)
