= James Dunn (actor) =

American actor (1901–1967)

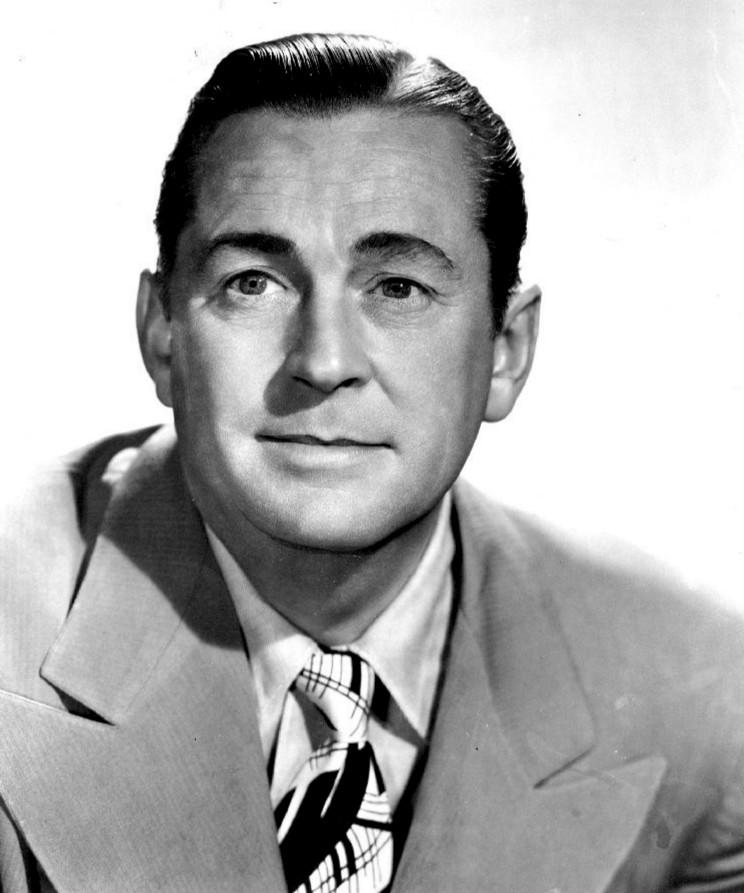
- 20th Century Fox studio portrait of Dunn, c. mid-1940s
- Born: James Howard Dunn; November 2, 1901; Manhattan, New York, U.S.
- Died: September 1, 1967 (aged 65); Santa Monica, California, U.S.
- Occupations: Actor; vaudeville performer
- Years active: 1927–1966
- Spouses: Edna O'Lier (div. 1922) Frances Gifford (m. 1937; div. 1943) Edna Rush (m. 1945–1967)

James Howard Dunn (November 2, 1901 – September 1, 1967), billed as Jimmy Dunn in his early career, was an American actor and vaudeville performer. The son of a New York stockbroker, he initially worked in his father's firm but was more interested in theater. He landed jobs as an extra in short films produced by Paramount Pictures in its Long Island studio, and also performed with several stock theater companies, culminating with playing the male lead in the 1929 Broadway musical Sweet Adeline. This performance attracted the attention of film studio executives, and in 1931, Fox Film signed him to a Hollywood contract.

His screen debut in the 1931 film Bad Girl made him an overnight box-office star and he was cast as the lead in a succession of romantic drama and comedy films. In 1934, he co-starred with Shirley Temple in her first three films. In 1935, at the height of his popularity, he broke his studio contract two years before it expired and became a free agent. With musicals on the wane in the late 1930s, he was cast in a series of B movies and struggled with alcoholism in his personal life. In 1945, having not worked for a major studio for five years, he was selected by director Elia Kazan for the role of Johnny Nolan, the dreamy alcoholic father in A Tree Grows in Brooklyn (1945), which earned him the Academy Award for Best Supporting Actor.

The Oscar did not advance his film career, however, and while he still found roles in Broadway productions, he became a character actor on television. He had a regular role in the hit sitcom It's a Great Life from 1954 to 1956, and guest-starred in dozens of episodes of popular television series from the 1950s through mid-1960s. In 1960, his contributions to film and television were recognized with two stars on the Hollywood Walk of Fame.

== Early life ==
James Howard Dunn was born on November 2, 1901, in Manhattan. His parents, Ralph H. Dunn (c. 1875–1943), a member of the New York Stock Exchange, and mother Jessie L. Archer (c. 1871–1946) had married in January 1901. He was their only child. He was of Irish descent.

In December 1905, while wintering with his parents at Shippan Point, Connecticut, the four-year-old Dunn had a near-accident, reported in The New York Times, when a bulldog belonging to his babysitter lunged at him. He was unhurt. Dunn grew up in New Rochelle, New York, and attended school there. He often skipped high school classes to hang around film studios in the upper Bronx.

== Career ==
=== Early film and stage career ===
After graduation, Dunn tried his hand at sales, selling lunch wagons and also becoming an automobile demonstrator. He worked for three years in his father's brokerage firm. But his real love was the theater. In 1927 he left his father's employ to join a small theatrical troupe. He later said in a 1934 interview: "I wasn't at all sure I'd be a hit, or even an actor good enough to obtain reasonably steady work. But that didn't make a lot of difference. I could not see any other career and I knew I wouldn't be happy unless I tried it". He also sought out jobs as an extra in short films at Paramount Pictures' Long Island studios. He joined a stock theater company out of Englewood, New Jersey, for a 37-week engagement, and performed with another company, the Permanent Players, at the Playhouse Theatre in Winnipeg, Canada, for a 22-week run. With the latter troupe, he was said to be "highly popular" among theatre-goers for his "pleasing, breezy personality". Upon his return to New York, he landed the male lead in the touring company of the musical Sweet Adeline, opposite Helen Morgan.

=== Success in Hollywood ===
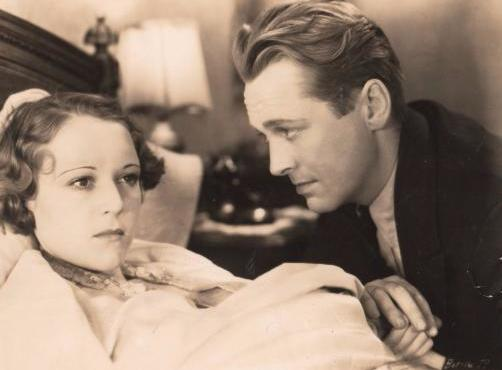
Dunn and Sally Eilers in Bad Girl

Dunn's Broadway performance attracted the attention of film studio executives. In 1931, Metro-Goldwyn-Mayer (MGM), which conducted its screen tests at Fox Film's Astoria Studios in Queens, New York, called Dunn in for a screen test. A Fox Film employee asked if they could also test Dunn, and had him read a scene from the stage production of Bad Girl. While MGM was not impressed with their result, Fox director Frank Borzage liked Dunn's screen test and wanted to cast him in his upcoming film version of Bad Girl. Dunn signed a film contract with Fox a few days later and relocated to Hollywood; his mother came to live with him the following year.

Dunn made his screen debut in Bad Girl (1931), which catapulted him and co-star Sally Eilers to "overnight fame". A Baltimore Evening Sun review wrote: "Without Dunn, Bad Girl would be just another movie. With him, it's something that provokes chuckles, tears, laughs, sighs and everything else that a nice little movie hopes to provoke". The Los Angeles Times called Dunn's star turn "triumphant", asserting that "no performance has lately equaled the impression made by this rather plain young man, who, aside from having a likable personality, scores a major hit by his ability as an actor".

Fox immediately re-teamed Dunn and Eilers in Over the Hill (1931), followed by Dance Team (1932), Sailor's Luck (1933), and Hold Me Tight (1933). Dunn also played the lead in Sob Sister (1931), Society Girl (1932), and Hello, Sister! (1933). By the end of 1932, Dunn was considered "one of the top 10 box office draws". By the end of 1933, he was being referred to as "America's boy friend".

=== Shirley Temple co-star ===
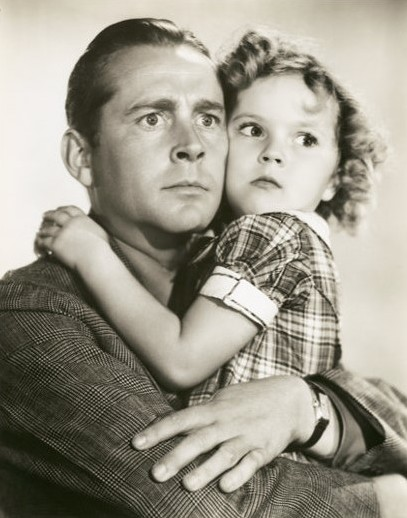
Dunn and Shirley Temple in a publicity photo for Bright Eyes (1934)

In 1934, Dunn appeared in seven films for Fox. Three of them were also the first three film appearances of six-year-old Shirley Temple. In Stand Up and Cheer!, Dunn and Temple play a father and daughter who perform in one song-and-dance sequence. Rather than have the young girl learn a new routine, the producers had Temple teach Dunn the steps to a tap-dance routine she had learned in her dancing school. Their memorable performance prompted studio executives to immediately cast them in a follow-up film, Baby Take a Bow, a remake of the 1928 silent film Square Crooks. Temple again plays Dunn's daughter in this film, whose title was the name of Dunn and Temple's song in Stand Up and Cheer! Their third film pairing was in Bright Eyes, a vehicle specifically written for Temple and co-starring Dunn as a bachelor pilot and friend of Temple's character's deceased father who seeks to adopt her. Temple sings "On the Good Ship Lollipop" aboard Dunn's character's airplane in this film. Later that same year, Temple was cast in a small part as Dunn's neighbor in Change of Heart.

Dunn and Temple worked well together. Temple later said that the day they began shooting their first film "was the start of my great romance with Jimmy Dunn". (Note: On an October 25, 1988, segment of Larry King Live, Temple said that as a child she had wanted to marry Dunn.) She also appreciated the fact that Dunn treated her as a peer. Dunn admitted that he was initially worried about playing opposite Temple, saying: "All actors dislike working with children. The kids usually steal most of your scenes, or run away with the picture entirely". Despite this, he admired Temple's professionalism and professed to being one of her fans. Temple received top billing in each of their films, and her career soon eclipsed his.

=== Career decline ===
During his five years as a contract player with Fox, Dunn appeared in 30 films. In 1935, at the height of his popularity, Dunn broke his studio contract two years before its expiration. He was about to start filming a remake of The Song and Dance Man, but the project was shelved due to Fox's merger with Twentieth Century Pictures. Dunn claimed he was "dissatisfied with pictures recently given me – except those with Shirley Temple". He was reportedly reimbursed for the remainder of his contract.

In 1936, Dunn signed a two-picture deal with Republic Pictures, with Hearts in Bondage being his first starring turn for the studio. With musicals on the wane in the late 1930s, Dunn's career slumped as he found roles in a series of "mediocre comedies and melodramas".

His prospects were also hurt by his problem with alcoholism. He admitted to a Los Angeles Times journalist in 1945 that he had often gone out for a few drinks with colleagues in the middle of the day while working on the Fox lot. According to Dorothy Lee, who worked alongside him on Take a Chance (1933), Dunn and co-star Lillian Roth took turns getting drunk during the production. Lee said: "They were both darling people ... when they were sober. When they began drinking heavily, they couldn't work at all. As soon as Jimmy sobered up, Lillian would go on a bender. They shot around them as much as they could, but they had scenes together and it was difficult to get them on the set at the same time. So I wound up staying in New York longer than I expected". During the filming of George White's 1935 Scandals, shooting started in the late morning to accommodate Dunn and other members of the cast who frequently imbibed. As drinking affected Dunn's performances in the late 1930s and early 1940s, he was regarded as "unemployable" by the major film studios.

In 1940, Dunn returned to Broadway for an 87-week run in the hit musical Panama Hattie with Ethel Merman, to positive reviews.

=== Academy Award winner ===
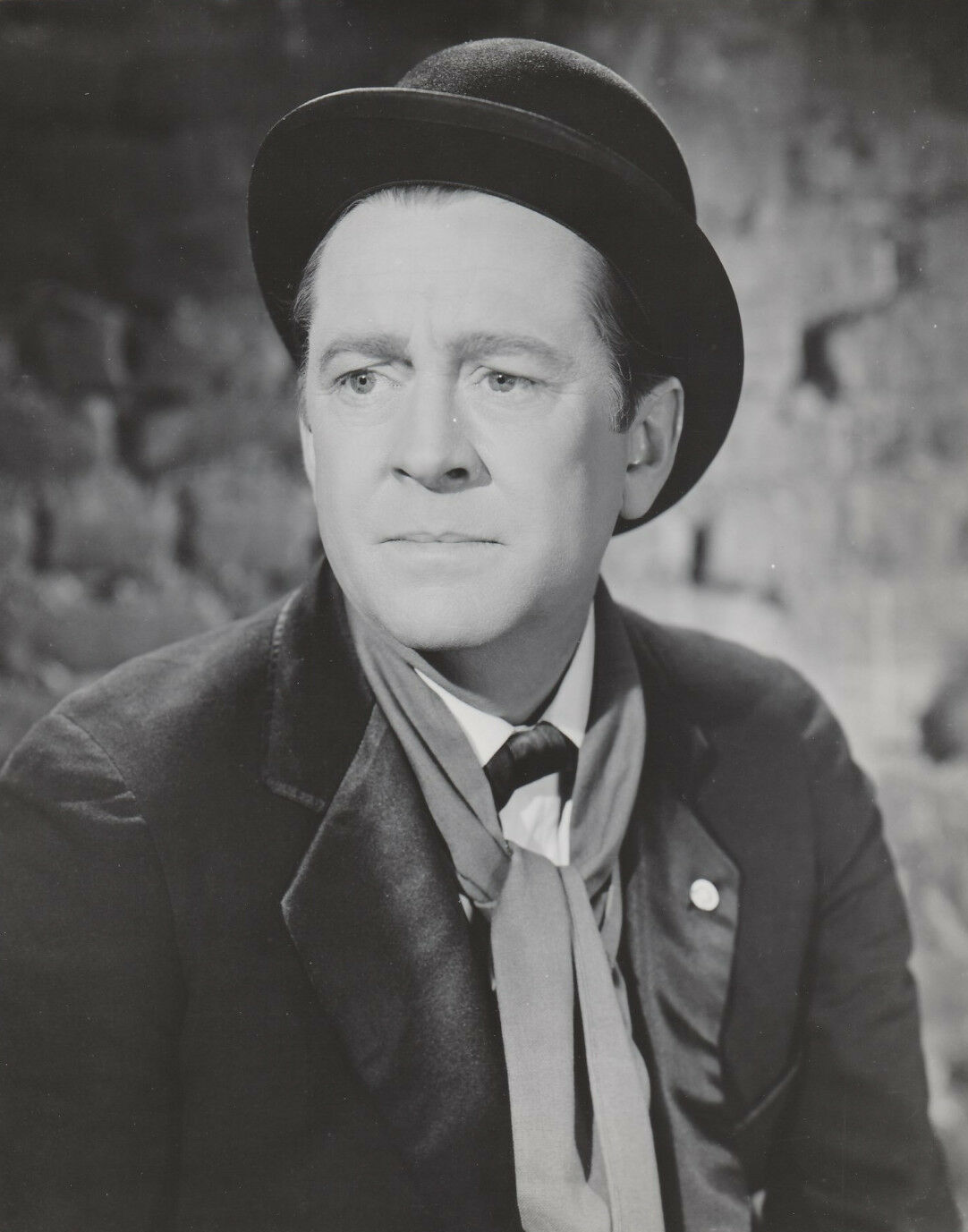
Publicity photo of Dunn as Johnny Nolan in A Tree Grows in Brooklyn (1945)

Dunn had not worked for a major studio for five years when he was called in to screen-test for the role of Johnny Nolan, the dreamy alcoholic father in the 20th Century Fox production A Tree Grows in Brooklyn (1945). Dunn had returned to Hollywood in 1944 to seek film roles but had not applied for this part for fear of another rejection. However, a friend, actress and dancer Gloria Grafton, urged casting directors involved in the extensive talent search to hire him. Director Elia Kazan said he chose Dunn for the role because drinking had impacted the actor's career, and because he saw "a trace of pain in Dunn's face that indicated he had 'failed the test of life' and [Kazan] wanted to bring that 'pain' to the screen". Dunn reportedly drew from his own experiences for his characterization.

Critics widely hailed Dunn's performance as his "finest". The Pittsburgh Sun-Telegraph wrote: "Mr. Dunn's Johnny Nolan has the mark of greatness about it, and he has never done before, nor ever will again, anything of more sublime conviction". Bosley Crowther of The New York Times commended the strong screen chemistry achieved by Dunn and Peggy Ann Garner, who played his daughter Francie:

Little Miss Garner, with her plain face and lank hair, is Francie Nolan to the life. And James Dunn plays her father, Johnny Nolan, with deep and sympathetic tenderness. In the radiant performance by these two actors of a dreamy adoration between father and child is achieved a pictorial demonstration of emotion that is sublimely eloquent.

At the 18th Academy Awards ceremony, Dunn won the Academy Award for Best Supporting Actor for his performance.

Winning the Oscar, however, did not revive his film prospects, and acting jobs were slow in coming. He returned to the role of an alcoholic father in Killer McCoy (1947) opposite Mickey Rooney, to complimentary reviews. His last film performance for nearly a decade was in the short film A Wonderful Life (1951), produced for the Christian film industry. Dunn appeared in four films in the 1960s, including another role as an alcoholic in The Bramble Bush (1960).

=== Return to the stage ===
In 1947, largely on the basis of his performance in A Tree Grows in Brooklyn, Dunn was cast as Jamie Tyrone, a man who resorted to drink to forget his unhappy past, in Eugene O'Neill's semi-autobiographical play A Moon for the Misbegotten. Considered the "name" actor in the production, Dunn was given a run-of-the-play contract and $1,000 per week, compared to the $750 per week salary of fellow performer J. M. Kerrigan. During rehearsals, O'Neill was dissatisfied with Dunn's portrayal of Tyrone, a character based on O'Neill's brother, claiming that Dunn "wasn't playing the role with enough gentlemanliness". The director defended Dunn's interpretation of the script. Meanwhile, Dunn felt out of his league playing tragedy rather than comedy. He had never seen an O'Neill play and said his wife had persuaded him to take the part for the "prestige". The production budget was increased by 10% to enable dress rehearsals to take place in New York rather than in the first out-of-town tryout in Columbus, Ohio, in order to accommodate Dunn's poor health. While Dunn's performance garnered critical praise on the tour, he left the production before it reached Broadway.

In 1948, Dunn succeeded James Stewart in Harvey, appearing in 108 performances of the long-running Broadway play. In 1951, Dunn played Willy Loman in Death of a Salesman at the Norwich Summer Theater. In 1964, he played the title role in Finian's Rainbow in a two-week summer engagement at the Melodyland Theatre in Anaheim, California.

=== Television career ===
In 1949, Dunn pursued a new direction as a character actor on television. He guest-starred in dozens of episodes of popular television series in the 1950s through mid-1960s, including Bonanza, Rawhide, Route 66, Ben Casey, and The Virginian. He had a regular role in the popular sitcom It's a Great Life, which aired 78 episodes from 1954 to 1956. Dunn played Earl Morgan, the deadbeat brother-in-law of the main character, Amy Morgan (Frances Bavier), who was always concocting get-rich-quick schemes to interest Amy's tenants, Steve Connors (William Bishop) and Denny Davis (Michael O'Shea). The three male comedians had good rapport and often ad-libbed their lines. The role required Dunn to play slapstick, which he had only done previously onstage.

In 1962, Dunn played a clown in full makeup and costume in an episode of Follow the Sun, and sang "On the Good Ship Lollipop" from his 1934 film Bright Eyes. In 1963 he played the character of P. J. Cunningham, the manager-driver for a music band led by Bobby Rydell, in the unsold Desilu half-hour television pilot Swingin' Together.

== Screen persona and recognition ==
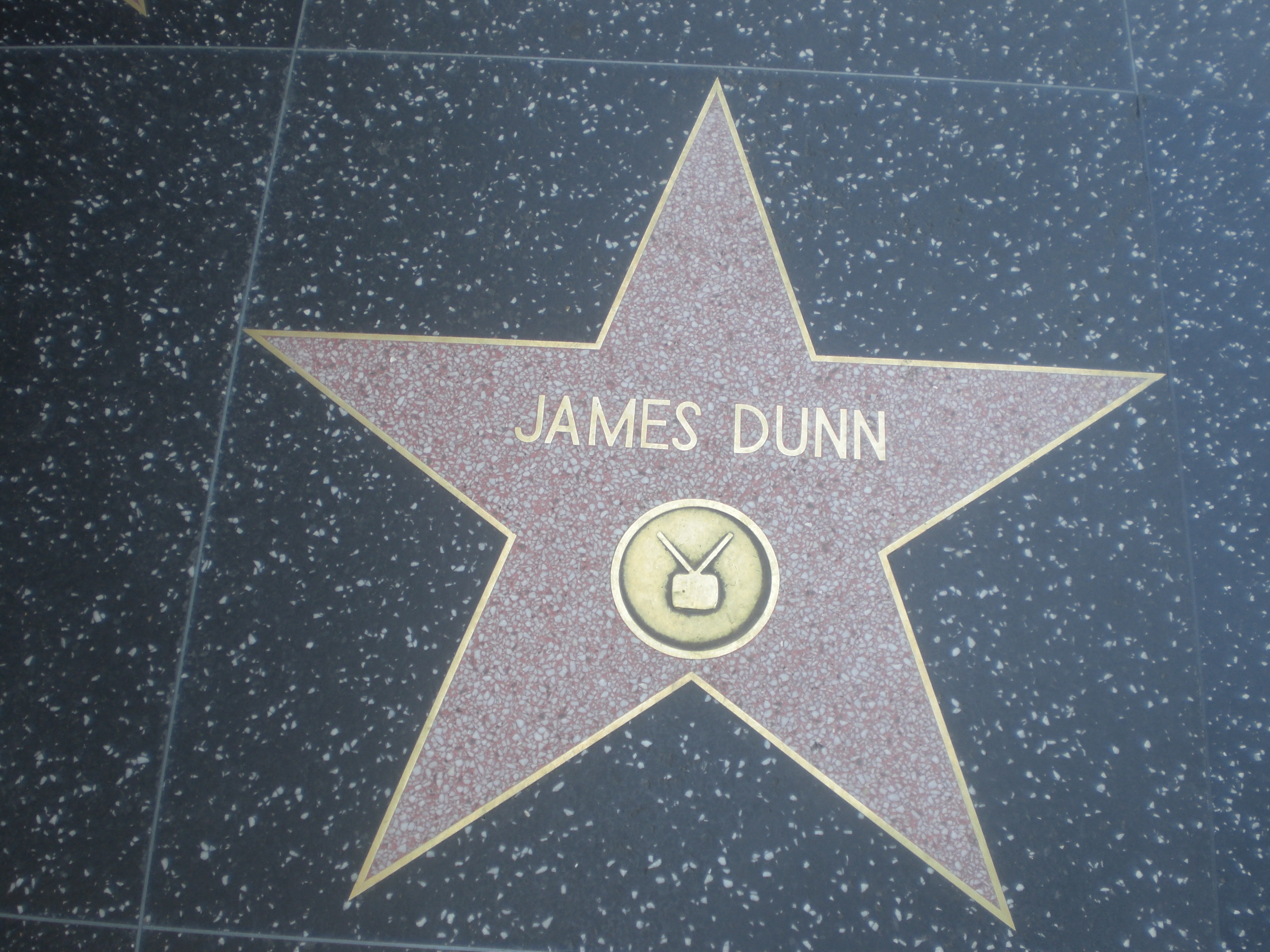
Star on the Hollywood Walk of Fame honoring Dunn's contributions to television

Dunn's smile, described as "sunny", "whimsical", "infectious", and "winning", was often singled out as an asset. The Arcadia Tribune claimed Dunn's smile was "patterned after the one the Prince of Wales uses".

In his Hollywood heyday in the 1930s, Dunn was noted for his "clean-cut good looks and boyish charm". As he matured, The New York Times described Dunn's "trademark" as an "expression of slightly battered wistfulness". The Associated Press characterized Dunn's later screen persona as "a well-meaning type of fellow whom women marry to mother".

Dunn was honored with two stars on the Hollywood Walk of Fame—one for his contributions to motion pictures at 6555 Hollywood Boulevard, and one for his contributions to television at 7010 Hollywood Boulevard. Both were dedicated on February 8, 1960.

== Personal life ==
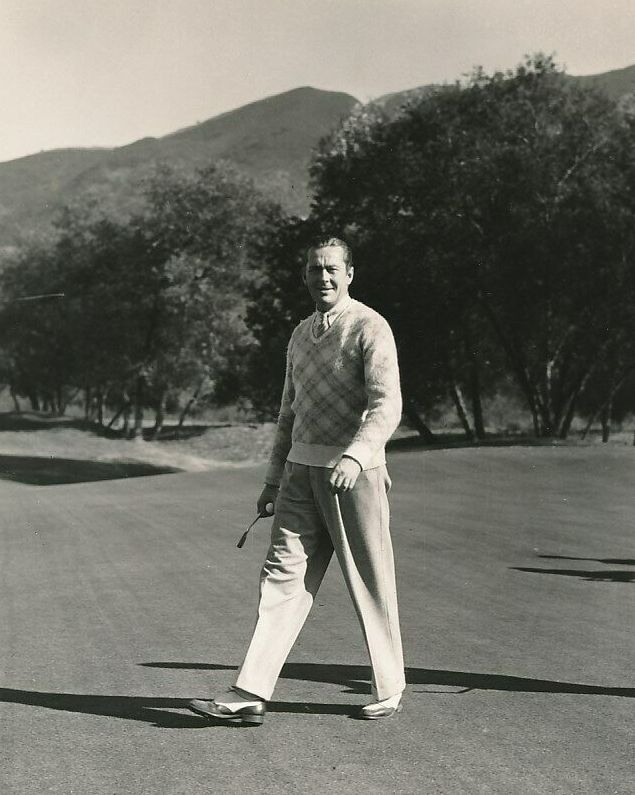
Dunn at the Lakeside Golf Club in Burbank

Even after his rise to stardom, Dunn was described as "unaffected and friendly". On the set of Hold Me Tight (1933), he insisted on filling in for an extra who was going home sick and who had confided to Dunn that he could not afford to lose his day's pay of $7.50. Author Pete Haynes, a Malibu, California, resident who played with Dunn's adopted son, Billy Pick, in the 1950s, remembers Dunn as "down to earth and friendly toward every person he came in contact with".

Dunn's sense of humor was often evident. To commemorate the leap year of 1936, he announced a $50 prize to the woman who could send him the best proposal, with a $25 prize for the runner-up. He received a total of 10,000 submissions and awarded first prize to a 20-year-old native of Oklahoma, who wrote him a four-page poem. An Associated Press wire photo showed the two sharing a toast at Dunn's studio in January 1937. Dunn awarded the second prize to a woman from Fort Beaufort, South Africa, and sent runner-up gifts to three other American women.

When he was not working, Dunn enjoyed playing golf and flying his airplane. He earned a pilot's license shortly after his arrival in California, having received training from Bob Blair, a charter pilot at Los Angeles Municipal Airport, who described him as "ultra-conservative" in the air. By 1940, Dunn had logged 750 flying hours. While under contract to Fox, however, the studio forbade him from participating in the 1935 Ruth Chatterton Air Derby.

=== Marriages ===
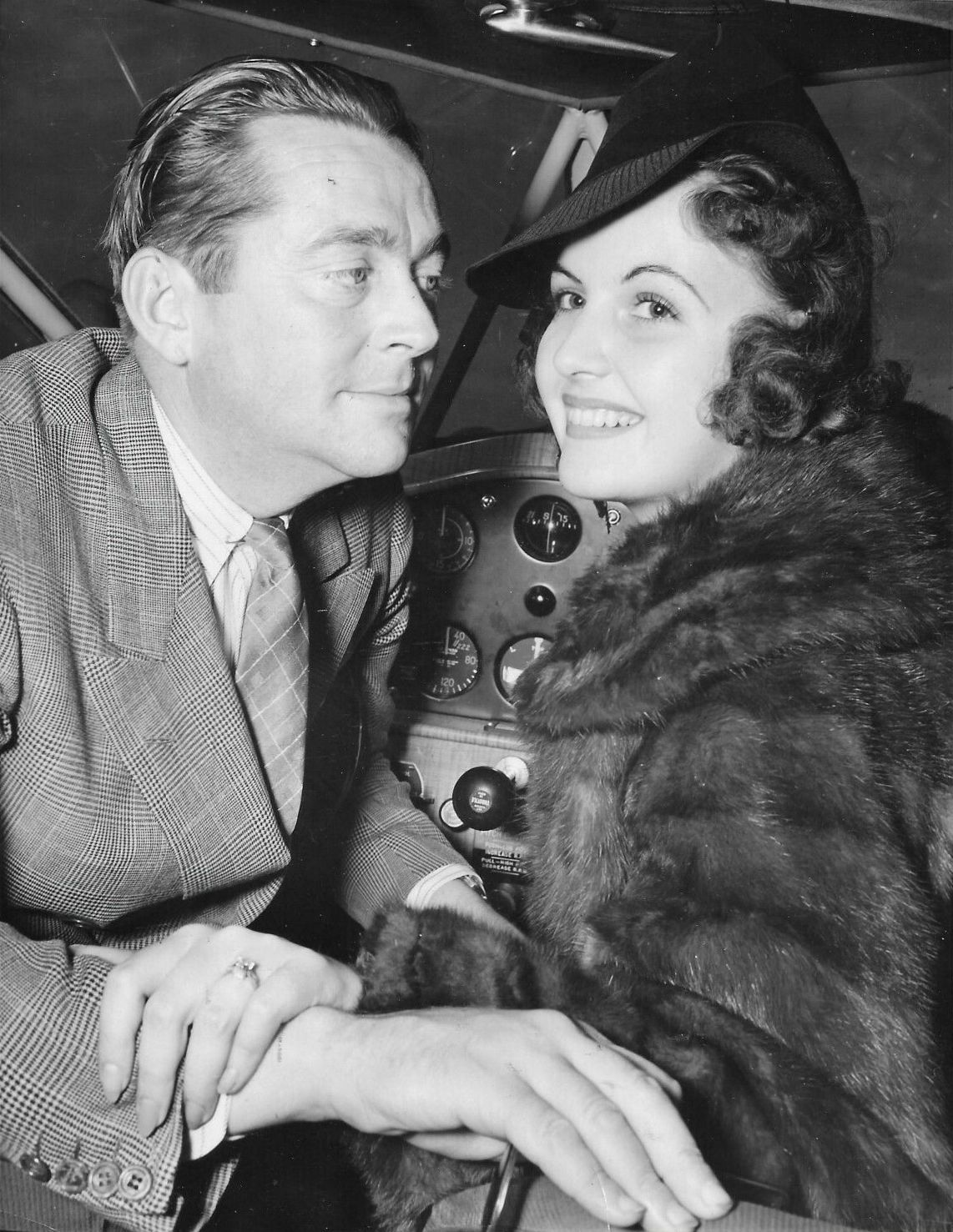
Dunn and Gifford in the cockpit of his airplane, 1937

Dunn was married three times. His first marriage ended in divorce in 1922. On Christmas Day 1937, Dunn and his fiancée, 17-year-old actress Frances Gifford, flew in his plane to Yuma, Arizona, to be married in a Presbyterian church there and afterwards returned to Hollywood. The couple later starred together in Mercy Plane (1939) and Hold That Woman! (1940). The marriage failed in 1942 as Dunn's career was in decline and he was struggling with alcoholism; their divorce was finalized in 1943. In 1945 Dunn married his third wife, singer Edna Rush, who survived him. Dunn adopted Rush's three-and-a-half-year-old son Billy.

=== Finances ===
In the 1930s, Dunn's weekly earnings were in the thousands of dollars; he also charged $5,000 for a personal appearance tour. His mother took charge of his finances and invested most of his earnings in stocks, bonds, real estate, and trust funds, giving him a weekly allowance. As a result, after Dunn left Fox and his career slumped, he had financial security. Upon his 1938 marriage, Dunn's mother gave him control of his portfolio. Thereafter Dunn lost a $40,000 option on a play, Cock of the Walk, that failed to reach Broadway, as well as thousands of dollars in the stock market. He was forced to sell his $50,000 house and move to a two-bedroom apartment in Malibu, from where he commuted to Hollywood. In October 1951, he filed for bankruptcy. However, his mother had reserved one trust fund for him which matured when he turned 50 and paid out $900 per month for life.

=== Death ===
Dunn died on September 1, 1967, aged 65, from complications following stomach surgery at Santa Monica Hospital. His funeral service in Santa Monica was attended by some 200 people, including fellow actors. His body was cremated and his ashes strewn at sea.

== Filmography ==
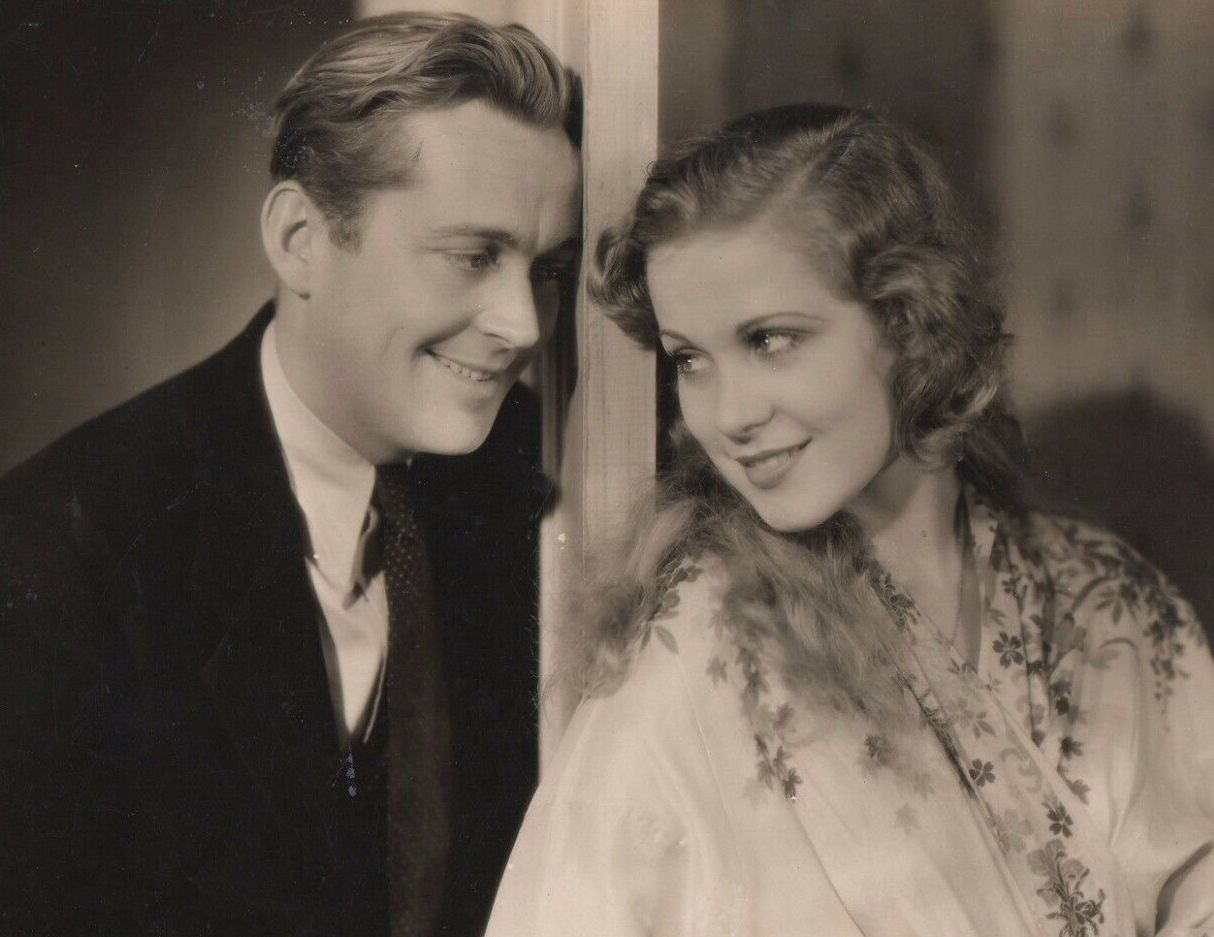
Dunn and Boots Mallory in Hello, Sister! (1933)

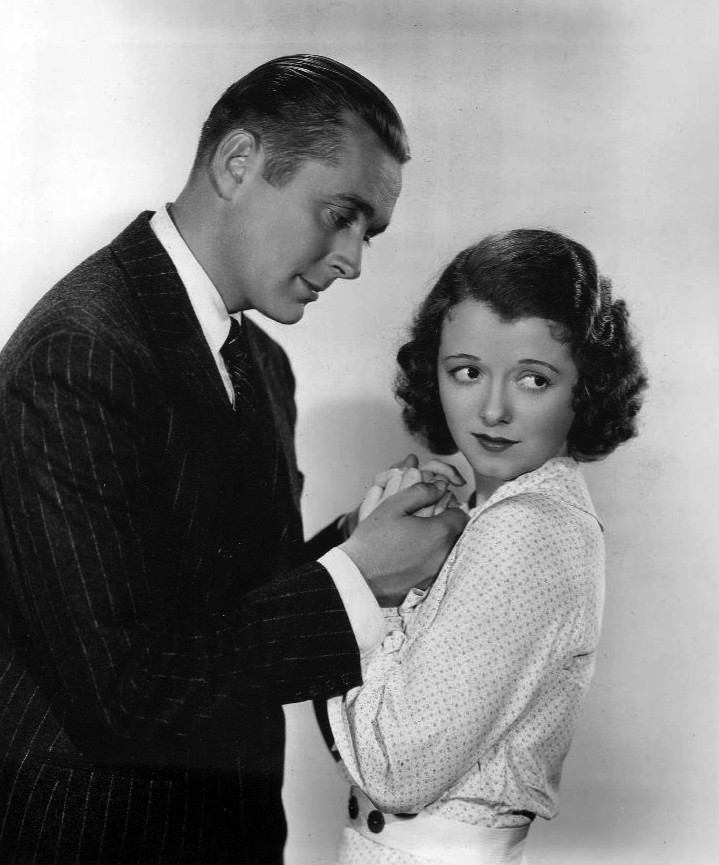
Dunn and Janet Gaynor in Change of Heart (1934)

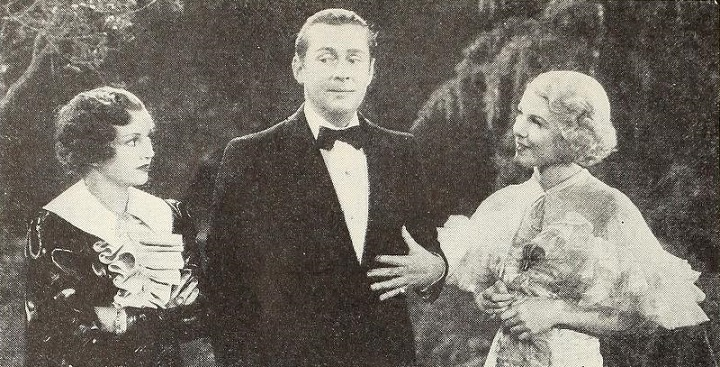
(L. to r.) Arline Judge, Dunn, and Rosina Lawrence in Welcome Home (1935)

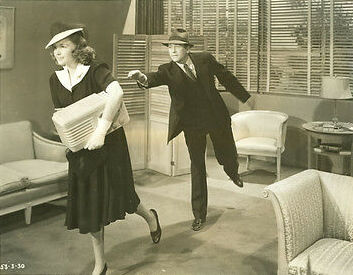
Dunn and Frances Gifford in Hold That Woman! (1940)

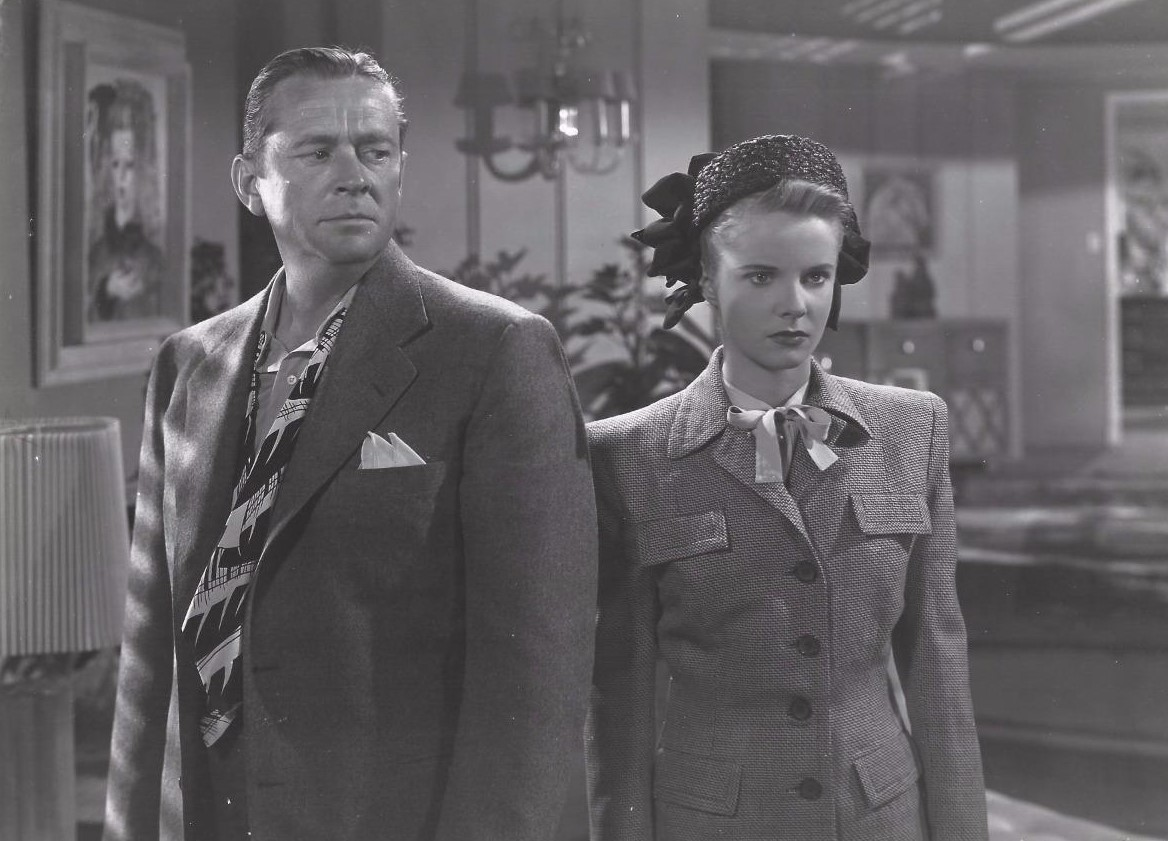
Dunn and Mona Freeman in That Brennan Girl (1946)

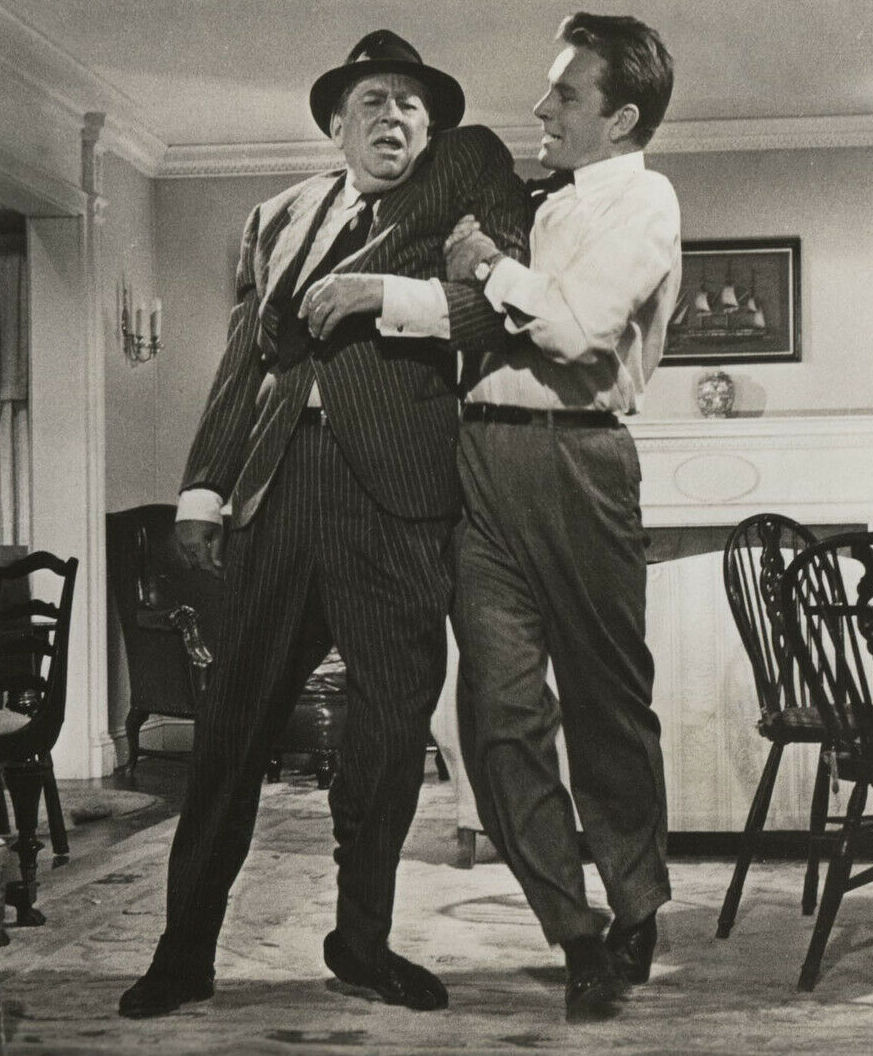
Dunn and Richard Burton in The Bramble Bush (1960)

Film
Year	Title	Role	Notes
1929	In the Nick of Time		Short
1930	Believe It or Not	Reporter	Short, uncredited
1930	Barefoot Days		Short
1930	Tom Thumbs Down		Short
1930	The Varsity Show		Short
1931	Retire Inn		Short
1931	Bad Girl	Eddie Collins	
1931	Sob Sister	Garry Webster	
1931	Over the Hill	Johnny Shelby (as adult)	
1932	Society Girl	Johnny Malone	
1932	Dance Team	Jimmy Mulligan	
1932	Handle with Care	Bill Gordon	
1933	Hold Me Tight	Chuck Evans	
1933	Hello, Sister!	Jimmy	
1933	The Girl in 419	Dr. Daniel French	
1933	Sailor's Luck	Jimmy Fenimore Harrigan	
1933	Arizona to Broadway	Smiley	
1933	Jimmy and Sally	Jimmy O'Connor	
1933	Take a Chance	Duke Stanley	
1934	Baby Take a Bow	Eddie Ellison	
1934	Have a Heart	Jimmie Flaherty	
1934	Bright Eyes	James 'Loop' Merritt	
1934	365 Nights in Hollywood	Jimmie Dale	
1934	Hold That Girl	Barney Sullivan	
1934	Stand Up and Cheer!	Jimmy Dugan	
1934	Change of Heart	Mack McGowan	
1935	George White's 1935 Scandals	Eddie Taylor	
1935	Welcome Home	Richard Foster	
1935	The Payoff	Joe McCoy	
1935	The Daring Young Man	Don McLane	
1935	Bad Boy	Eddie Nolan	
1936	Two-Fisted Gentleman	Mickey	
1936	Don't Get Personal	Bob McDonald	
1936	Come Closer, Folks	Jim Keene	
1936	Hearts in Bondage	Lieutenant Kenneth Reynolds	
1936	Mysterious Crossing	Addison Francis Murphy	
1937	We Have Our Moments	John Wade	
1937	Venus Makes Trouble	Buzz Martin	
1937	Living on Love	Gary Martin	
1938	Shadows Over Shanghai	Johnny McGinty	
1939	Mercy Plane	"Speed" Leslie	
1939	Pride of the Navy	Speed Brennan	
1940	Hold That Woman!	Jimmy Parker	
1940	Son of the Navy	Malone	
1942	The Living Ghost	Nick Trayne	
1943	The Ghost and the Guest	Webster Frye	
1944	Leave It to the Irish	Terry Moran	
1944	Government Girl	Sergeant Joe Bates	
1945	A Tree Grows in Brooklyn	Johnny Nolan	Academy Award for Best Supporting Actor
1945	The Caribbean Mystery	Smith	
1946	That Brennan Girl	Denny Reagan	
1947	Killer McCoy	Brian McCoy	
1948	Texas, Brooklyn & Heaven	Mike	
1950	The Golden Gloves Story	Joe Riley	
1951	A Wonderful Life	Henry Wood	
1960	The Bramble Bush	Stew Schaeffer	
1962	Hemingway's Adventures of a Young Man	Telegrapher	
1966	The Oscar	Network executive	
1968	Shadow Over Elveron	Luke Travers	Television movie

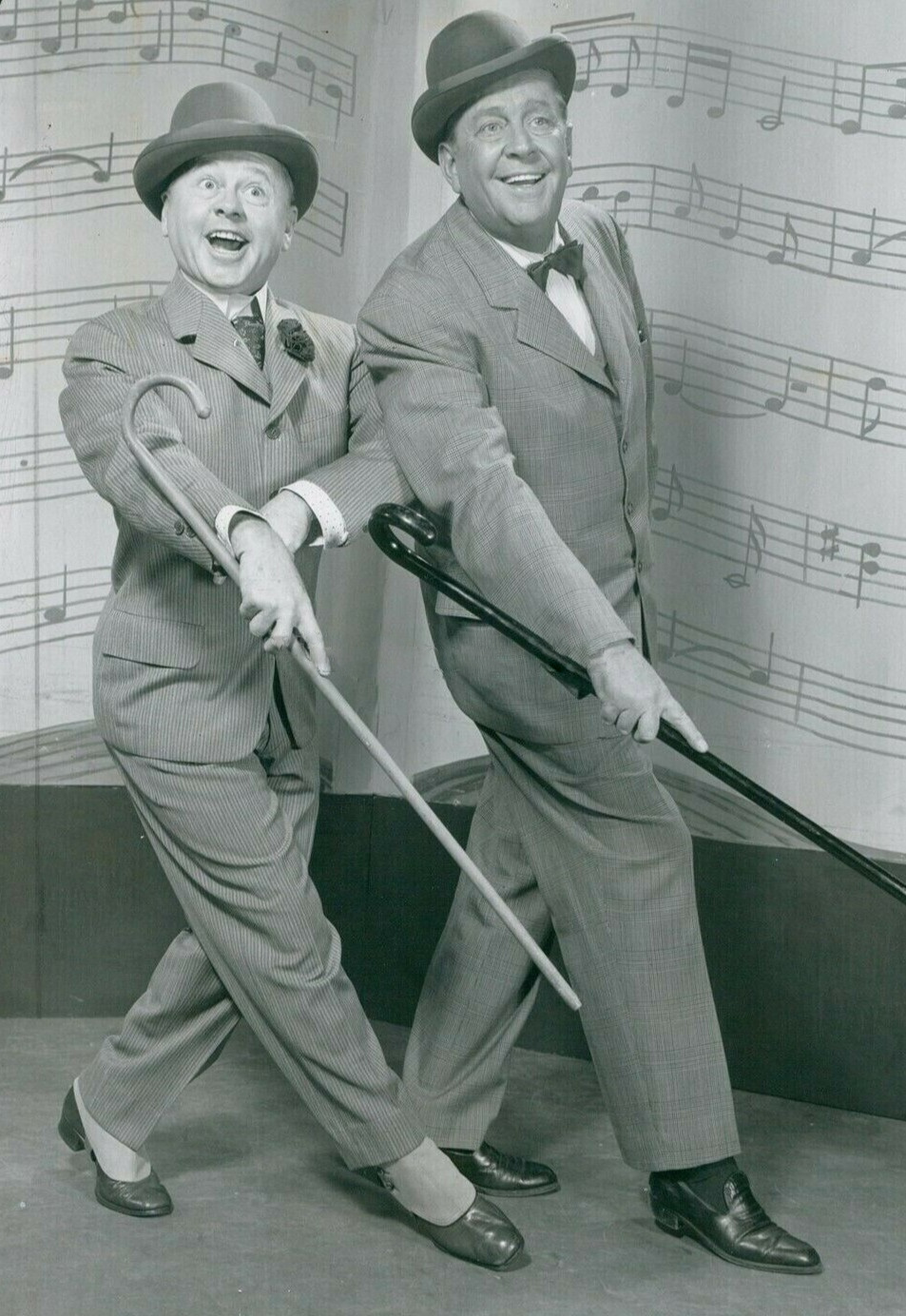
Dunn and Mickey Rooney in the television special Mr. Broadway (1957)

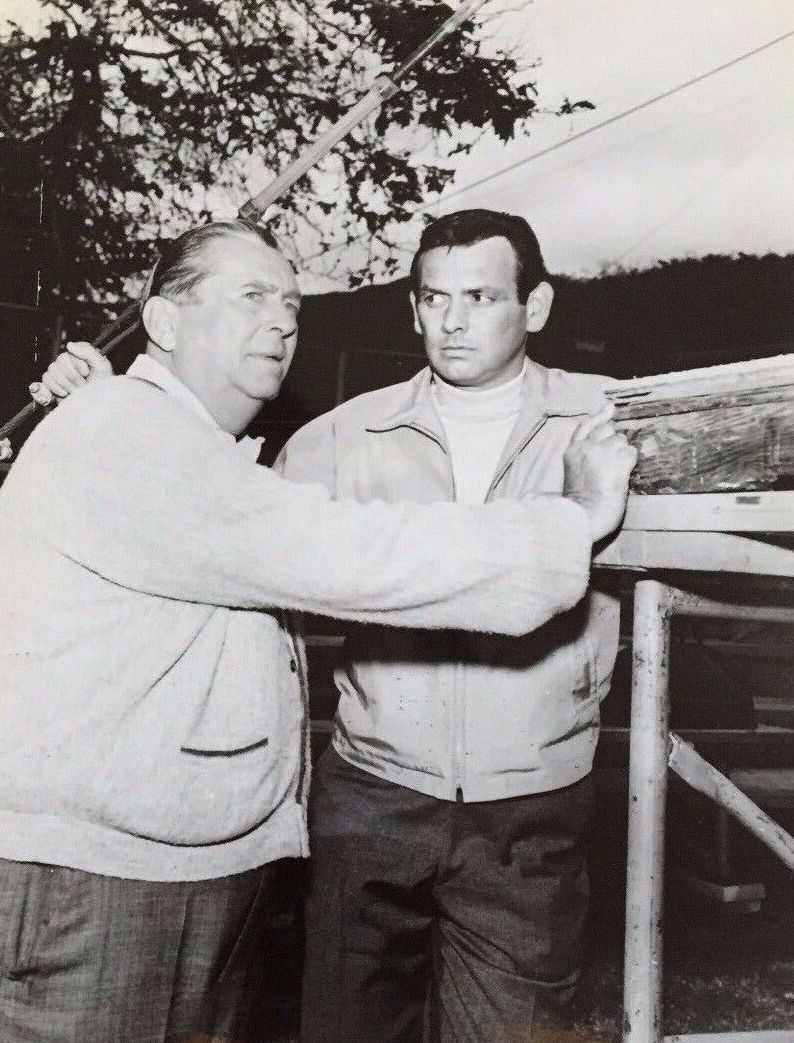
Dunn with David Janssen in The Fugitive (1963)

TV
Year	Title	Role	Notes
1948	The Chevrolet Tele-Theatre	Cassidy	Episode: "No Shoes"
1951	The Garry Moore Evening Show	Guest appearance	October 24, 1951; Acted out a scene from A Tree Grows in Brooklyn with Margaret O'Brien
1954–1956	It's a Great Life	Earl Morgan	76 episodes
1954	Schlitz Playhouse of Stars	Bookkeeper	Episode: "The Treasure of Santo Domingo"
1955	Studio One	Bookkeeper	Episode: "A Picture in the Paper"
1955	Schlitz Playhouse of Stars	Coach Dan McLain	Episode: "Nothing to Do Until Next Fall"
1956	Climax!	Eldon Abernathy	Episode: "The Secret of River Lane"
1957	The Red Skelton Show	Guest appearance	January 29, 1957
1957	Mr. Broadway	Jerry Cohan	May 11, 1957
1957	Climax!		Episode: "Keep Me in Mind"
1958	Wanted Dead or Alive	Gabe	1 episode
1958	The Nine Lives of Elfego Baca	J. Henry Newman	Several episodes
1959	Bonanza	Danny	1 episode
1959	Rawhide	Flood	1 episode
1960	Route 66	Van Carter	2 episodes
1961	The Investigators	Chief Reynolds	Episode: "The Mind's Own Fire"
1962	The Virginian	Congressman	1 episode
1962	Wagon Train	Winslow	1 episode
1962	Follow the Sun	Clown	Episode: "Run, Clown, Run"
1963	The Fugitive	Bragan	Episode: "Decision in the Ring"
1963	Swingin' Together	P. J. Cunningham	Unsold TV pilot
1965	Branded	Manning	1 episode

== Bibliography ==
- Beatty, Jerome (1935). Shirley Temple. Saalfield Publishing Company. p. 75. "James Dunn, who appeared in three pictures with Shirley and who was to see her pass him in importance, is one of her greatest 'fans'."
- Bodnar, John (2006). Blue-Collar Hollywood: Liberalism, Democracy, and Working People in American Film. JHU Press. ISBN 9780801885372.
- Bradley, Edwin M. (2015). The First Hollywood Sound Shorts, 1926-1931. McFarland. ISBN 9781476606842.
- Brotherton, Jamie; Okuda, Ted (2013). Dorothy Lee: The Life and Films of the Wheeler and Woolsey Girl. McFarland. ISBN 9781476600482.
- Deane, Pamala S. (2014). James Edwards: African American Hollywood Icon. McFarland. ISBN 9780786458165.
- Edwards, Anne (2017). Shirley Temple: American Princess. Rowman & Littlefield. ISBN 9781493026920.
- Ellenberger, Allen R. (2015). Margaret O'Brien: A Career Chronicle and Biography. McFarland. ISBN 9781476604015.
- Erickson, Hal (2009). Encyclopedia of Television Law Shows. McFarland. ISBN 9780786454525.
- Gelb, Arthur; Gelb, Barbara (2016). By Women Possessed: A Life of Eugene O'Neill. Penguin. ISBN 9780698170681.
- Griffin, William D. (1990). The Book of Irish Americans. Times Books. ISBN 9780812912647.
- Hall, Constance Valis (2010). Tap Dancing America: A Cultural History. Oxford University Press. ISBN 9780199745890.
- Hammontree, Patsy Guy (1998). Shirley Temple Black: A Bio-bibliography. Greenwood Press. ISBN 9780313258480.
- Hawes, William (2015). Live Television Drama, 1946–1951. McFarland. ISBN 9781476608495.
- Haynes, Pete (2018). 1950s Malibu: Growing up in Paradise. Page Publishing Inc. ISBN 9781642988895.
- Hyatt, Wesley (2004). A Critical History of Television's The Red Skelton Show, 1951-1971. McFarland. ISBN 9780786417322.
- Kasson, John F. (2014). The Little Girl Who Fought the Great Depression: Shirley Temple and 1930s America. W. W. Norton & Company. p. 80. ISBN 9780393240795.
- Kinn, Gail; Piazza, Jim (2006). The Academy Awards: The Complete Unofficial History (4th ed.). Black Dog & Leventha. ISBN 9781579125455.
- Kobal, John (1985). People Will Talk. Knopf. ISBN 978-0-394-53660-6.
- Lindvall, Terry; Quicke, Andrew (2011). Celluloid Sermons: The Emergence of the Christian Film Industry, 1930-1986. NYU Press. ISBN 9780814753255.
- Maltin, Leonard (1994), Leonard Maltin's Movie Encyclopedia, Dutton, ISBN 0-525-93635-1
- Mayer, Geoff (2017). Encyclopedia of American Film Serials. McFarland. ISBN 9781476627199.
- Romano, Frederick V. (2004). The Boxing Filmography: American Features, 1920-2003. McFarland. ISBN 9780786417933.
- Seaman, Barbara (1996). Lovely Me: The Life of Jacqueline Susann. Seven Stories Press. ISBN 9781888363371.
- Shea, Laura (2015). A Moon for the Misbegotten on the American Stage: A History of the Major Productions. McFarland. ISBN 9781476621777.
- Terrace, Vincent (2013). Television Specials: 5,336 Entertainment Programs, 1936-2012 (2nd ed.). McFarland. ISBN 9781476612409.
- Terrace, Vincent (2020). Encyclopedia of Television Pilots: 2,470 Films Broadcast 1937-2019 (2nd ed.). McFarland. ISBN 9781476638102.
- Thomas, Tony (1984). That's Dancing!. Abrams. ISBN 9780810916821.
- Tucker, David C. (2010). Lost Laughs of '50s and '60s Television: Thirty Sitcoms That Faded Off Screen. McFarland. ISBN 9780786455829.
