= Swingin' Together =

- Genre: Musical comedy
- Written by: Howard Leeds
- Directed by: Gene Reynolds
- Starring: Bobby Rydell; James Dunn
- Theme music composer: Kal Mann and Dave Appell
- Opening theme: "Swingin' Together"
- Country of origin: United States
- Original language: English
- No. of episodes: 1

Production
- Producers: Jerry Thorpe; Howard Kreitsik
- Running time: 30 minutes
- Production companies: Desilu Productions; Ludlow Productions

Original release
- Network: CBS
- Release: August 26, 1963

Swingin' Together is a 30-minute unsold television pilot co-produced by Desilu Productions and Ludlow Productions. The proposed musical comedy series stars Bobby Rydell as the leader of a rock band called Bobby Day and the Four Knights, who travel around the country on an old bus driven by their manager, P. J. Cunningham (James Dunn), seeking their big break. The pilot aired on August 26, 1963, in the first season of CBS' Vacation Playhouse, a summer showcase for unsold Desilu television pilots.

== Plot ==
Bobby Day (Bobby Rydell) is the leader of a rock 'n roll band called Bobby Day and the Four Knights. The band members live on an old bus named The Lucinda, driven by their manager, P. J. Cunningham (James Dunn), and travel to one-night gigs across the country seeking their big break. In the pilot, P. J. has booked them at a country club benefit. They set up and start playing "The Twist", but are told to leave by the organizer, Linda Craig (Stefanie Powers), who objects to their style of music. P. J. collars Linda's father and threatens him with a lawsuit. Her father apologizes to the band members and assures them that they will be able to continue. At the benefit, the band plays "The Start of Something Big", energizing the crowd. Bobby attempts to speak with Linda, who is still unhappy with their style of music, but when they launch into a cover of "Let's Twist Again", Linda's father encourages her to join in the dancing and she begins to enjoy it.

== Cast ==
- Bobby Rydell as Bobby Day
- James Dunn as P. J. Cunningham
- Ben Bryant as Skooby-doo
- Larry Merrill as Steve
- Peter Brooks as Yogi
- Art Metrano as Big D

=== Guest stars (uncredited) ===
- Stefanie Powers as Linda Craig
- Lloyd Corrigan as Mr. Craig
- Frank Cady as Woody (gas station attendant)

Three of Bing Crosby's sons—Dennis, Lindsay, and Phillip—appear as singers.

== Production ==
=== Development ===
The concept for a television series starring Bobby Rydell, then a popular singer, began in fall 1961 with the tentative title The Bobby Rydell Show. That same year, a feature film called Teenage Millionaire cast Jimmy Clanton in the role of Bobby Schultz, an orphaned singer who records a song at his aunt's radio station and sees it become popular thanks to his new girlfriend. Desilu retitled their project Teenage Millionaire and planned to cast Rydell as Bobby Schultz and Judy Rawlins as his girlfriend. In December 1961, the concept was revised further into a series featuring Rydell as the leader of a rock 'n roll band, with the title Saturday Nights. The title was then changed to Swingin' Together.

The show business theme was common to other Desilu pilots of the time, but the rock 'n roll angle was unique. Swingin' Together was co-produced by Desilu Productions and Ludlow Productions.

In 1962 Rydell released a song called "Swingin' Together" with Chubby Checker on the B-side of their 45 record "Teach Me To Twist".

=== Filming ===
The pilot was filmed in January 1963 at Desilu Studios. It was directed by Gene Reynolds and produced by Jerry Thorpe. Howard Kreitsik produced for Desilu Studios.

== Release ==
The pilot aired on August 26, 1963, during the first season of Vacation Playhouse on CBS.

== Critical reception ==
A review in The Pittsburgh Press called the episode "painful" to watch. It commended the contribution of character actor James Dunn as the band's manager-driver, but panned the insipid dialogue between the band members. The Morning Call summed it up as "a rock-'n'-roll pilot film that has nothing much, except Bobby Rydell singing, drumming and smiling". The Philadelphia Daily News called the episode "a skimpy little pilot, designed exclusively to give Bobby Rydell a chance to sing".

== Sources ==
- Goldberg, Lee (2015). Unsold Television Pilots: 1955-1989. Adventures in Television. ISBN 9781511590679.
- Irvin, Richard (2020). The Forgotten Desi and Lucy TV Projects: The Desilu Series and Specials that Might Have Been. BearManor Media. ISBN 978-1-62933-545-2.
- Standard Catalog of American Records, 1950-1975 (2nd ed.). Krause Publications. 2000. ISBN 9780873419345.
- Terrace, Vincent (2020). Encyclopedia of Television Pilots: 2,470 Films Broadcast 1937-2019 (2nd ed.). McFarland. ISBN 9781476638102.
