= Slaves of Beauty =

1927 film

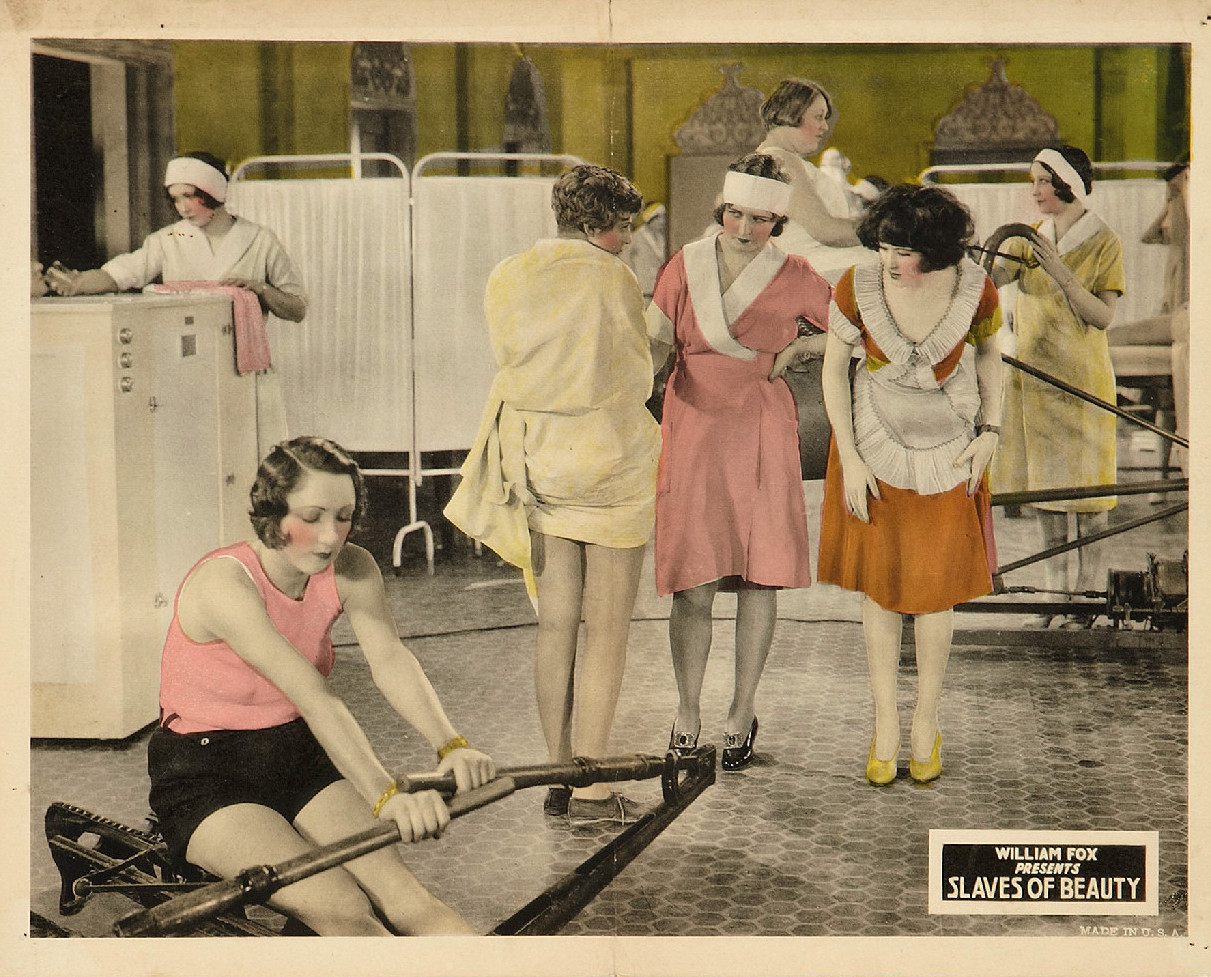
- Lobby card
- Directed by: John G. Blystone; Jasper Blystone
- Written by: William M. Conselman (scenario); James K. McGuinness (titles)
- Based on: "The Grandflapper" by Nina Wilcox Putnam
- Produced by: William Fox
- Starring: Olive Tell; Holmes Herbert; Earle Foxe
- Cinematography: L. William O'Connell
- Edited by: Margaret Clancey
- Distributed by: Fox Film Corporation
- Release date: June 5, 1927
- Running time: 60 minutes; 6 reels; 5,412 feet
- Country: United States
- Language: Silent (English intertitles)

Slaves of Beauty is a 1927 American silent comedy drama film directed by John G. Blystone and starring Olive Tell, Holmes Herbert, Earle Foxe, Margaret Livingston, and future talent agent Sue Carol. The film was written by William M. Conselman from a story by Nina Wilcox Putnam entitled "The Grandflapper," edited by Margaret Clancey and photographed by L. William O'Connell, with intertitles by James Kevin McGuinness. The movie, released by the Fox Film Corporation, is a comedic send-up of the beauty salon industry with a running time of 60 minutes.

== Cast ==
- Olive Tell as Anastasia Jones
- Holmes Herbert as Leonard Jones
- Earle Foxe as Paul Perry
- Margaret Livingston as Goldie
- Sue Carol as Dorothy Jones
- Richard Walling as Robert
- Mary Foy as Irishwoman
- Mickey Bennett (small role)

== Preservation status ==
The film is now lost.
