= Margaret Clancey =

American film editor and actress

- Born: Margaret Virginia Lysight; July 29, 1897; Tucson, Arizona, USA
- Died: March 8, 1989 (aged 91); Los Angeles, California, USA
- Occupation(s): Film editor, actress
- Years active: 1915-1940
- Spouse: James Clancey

Margaret Clancey (sometimes credited as Margaret V. Clancy or under her birth name, Margaret Lysight) was an American film editor and actress. Clancey edited 30 Hollywood films at Fox and United Artists from 1927 to 1938.

== Biography ==
Margaret, daughter of Austin Lysight and Cornelia Hill, was born and raised in Tucson, Arizona. In her teens, after graduating from high school (where she was class valedictorian, wrote for her high school magazine, and starred in school plays), she moved to Los Angeles in 1915 to pursue an acting career.

She quickly found work in minor roles at Keystone and Fine Arts; she played several minor roles in D.W. Griffith's Intolerance, and also appeared in Diane of the Follies, Hands-Up, Madame Bo Peep, and Mr. Grex of Monte Carlo. In 1917, she got her big break when she was cast in a lead role as an ingenue in Kisaburô Kurihara's Yume No Tabiji, shot in Yokohama, Japan. She stayed in Japan for two years.

She returned to Los Angeles in 1919, where she worked as a member of Allan Dwan's company and married photographer James Clancey. That same year, she found employment as a film editor at Select Pictures. By 1925, she was working at Fox, and later she found herself at United Artists. She did not receive credits on many of her earliest editing jobs.

== Selected filmography ==
- The Hill Billy (1924)
- The Heart of Salome (1927)
- Slaves of Beauty (1927)
- Hangman's House (1928)
- Mother Knows Best (1928)
- They Had to See Paris (1929)
- Song o' My Heart (1930)
- Liliom (1930)
- Annabelle's Affairs (1931)
- Bad Girl (1931)
- Heartbreak (1931)
- Dance Team (1932)
- After Tomorrow (1932)
- Society Girl (1932)
- Best of Enemies (1933)
- Stand Up and Cheer! (1934)
- Hell in the Heavens (1934)
- Bad Boy (1935)
- Splendor (1935)
- The Gay Desperado (1936)
- History Is Made at Night (1937)
- The Adventures of Tom Sawyer (1938)
