= Disorderly Conduct (film) =

1932 film

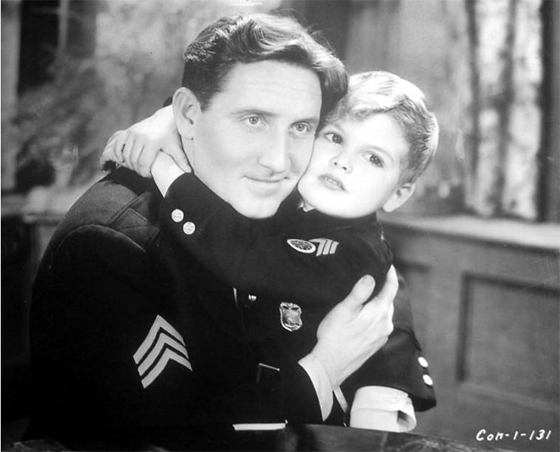
- Publicity still with Spencer Tracy and Dickie Moore
- Directed by: John W. Considine Jr.
- Written by: William Anthony McGuire
- Produced by: William Fox
- Starring: Spencer Tracy; Sally Eilers; Ralph Bellamy
- Cinematography: Ray June
- Music by: George Lipschultz
- Distributed by: Fox Film Corporation
- Release date: March 20, 1932
- Running time: 82 minutes
- Country: United States
- Language: English
- Budget: $300,000
- Box office: $427,659 (US rentals)

Disorderly Conduct is a 1932 American pre-Code film directed by John W. Considine Jr. starring Spencer Tracy, Sally Eilers and Ralph Bellamy. It was the seventh picture Tracy made under his contract with Fox Film Corporation, and the first to make a profit since his debut Up the River.

Mordaunt Hall, in his review for The New York Times, praised the film's "racy dialogue and highly commendable performances", but bemoaned the "strained and implausible" story.

== Plot ==
A policeman becomes involved with a young woman after clashing with her politician father.

== Cast ==
- Spencer Tracy as Dick Fay
- Sally Eilers as Phyllis Crawford
- El Brendel as Olsen
- Dickie Moore as Jimmy
- Ralph Bellamy as Captain Tom Manning
- Ralph Morgan as James Crawford
- Alan Dinehart as Fletcher
- Frank Conroy as Tony Alsotto
- Cornelius Keefe as Stallings
- Geneva Mitchell as Phoebe Darnton
- Sally Blane as Helen Burke
- Nora Lane as Gwen Fiske
- Charley Grapewin as Limpy
