= The Monster Maker =

1944 film by Sam Newfield

- Promotional release poster
- Directed by: Sam Newfield
- Written by: Lawrence Williams; Pierre Gendron; Martin Mooney
- Produced by: Sigmund Neufeld
- Starring: J. Carrol Naish; Ralph Morgan; Tala Birell
- Cinematography: Sam Newfield
- Edited by: Robert E. Cline
- Music by: Albert Glasser
- Distributed by: Producers Releasing Corporation
- Release date: April 15, 1944
- Running time: 62 minutes
- Country: United States
- Language: English

The Monster Maker is a 1944 science-fiction horror film starring J. Carrol Naish and Ralph Morgan. Albert Glasser supplied the film score, his first, an assignment for which he was paid US$250.

== Plot ==
Dr. Markoff (J. Carrol Naish) has concocted a formula that spreads acromegaly, a hideous disease that extends bones and distorts facial features. Markoff has no moral dilemma in experimenting on unsuspecting human subjects. His amoral behavior assumes monstrous dimensions when famed concert pianist Lawrence (Ralph Morgan) is injected with the doctor's disease-inducing serum. In return for an antidote, Markoff intends to exact more than his pound of flesh by extorting a fortune from Lawrence and demanding the hand of the musician's pretty daughter Patricia (Wanda McKay).

== Cast ==
- J. Carrol Naish as Dr. Igor Markoff
- Ralph Morgan as Anthony Lawrence
- Tala Birell as Maxine
- Wanda McKay as Patricia Lawrence
- Terry Frost as Bob Blake
- Glenn Strange as Giant / Steve
- Alexander Pollard as Butler / Stack
- Sam Flint as Dr. Adams
- Ace the Wonder Dog as Ace

== Production and reception ==
PRC hadn't released a horror picture in nearly 17 months, having spent most of 1943 substantially expanding their capabilities by purchasing the bankrupt Chadwick Studio (a poverty row operation that specialized in renting stages and production equipment to low-budget producers along Gower) for $305,000. While critics, what few that would review a PRC release, complained about the film's lack of action, production values were noted to be somewhat higher than earlier releases. The working title of this film was The Devil's Apprentice.

The film holds an extremely low 3% on Rotten Tomatoes and a 4.7/10 on the Internet Movie Database.

== See also ==
- List of films in the public domain in the United States
