= Carnival (1935 film) =

1935 film by Walter Lang

- Directed by: Walter Lang
- Screenplay by: Robert Riskin
- Story by: Robert Riskin
- Produced by: Samuel J. Briskin
- Starring: Jimmy Durante; Sally Eilers
- Cinematography: Allen G. Siegler
- Edited by: Richard Cahoon; Gene Milford
- Color process: Black and white
- Production company: Columbia Pictures
- Distributed by: Columbia Pictures
- Release date: February 15, 1935
- Running time: 77 minutes
- Country: United States
- Language: English

Carnival is a 1935 American comedy film directed by Walter Lang and starring Lee Tracy, Sally Eilers and Jimmy Durante.

The film also includes a young Lucille Ball in a small uncredited role as a nurse.

== Cast ==
- Lee Tracy as Chick Thompson
- Sally Eilers as Dasiy
- Jimmy Durante as Fingers
- Florence Rice as Miss Holbrook
- Thomas E. Jackson as Mac
- Dickie Walters as Poochy (as John Richard Walters)
