= Society Girl (1932 film) =

1932 film

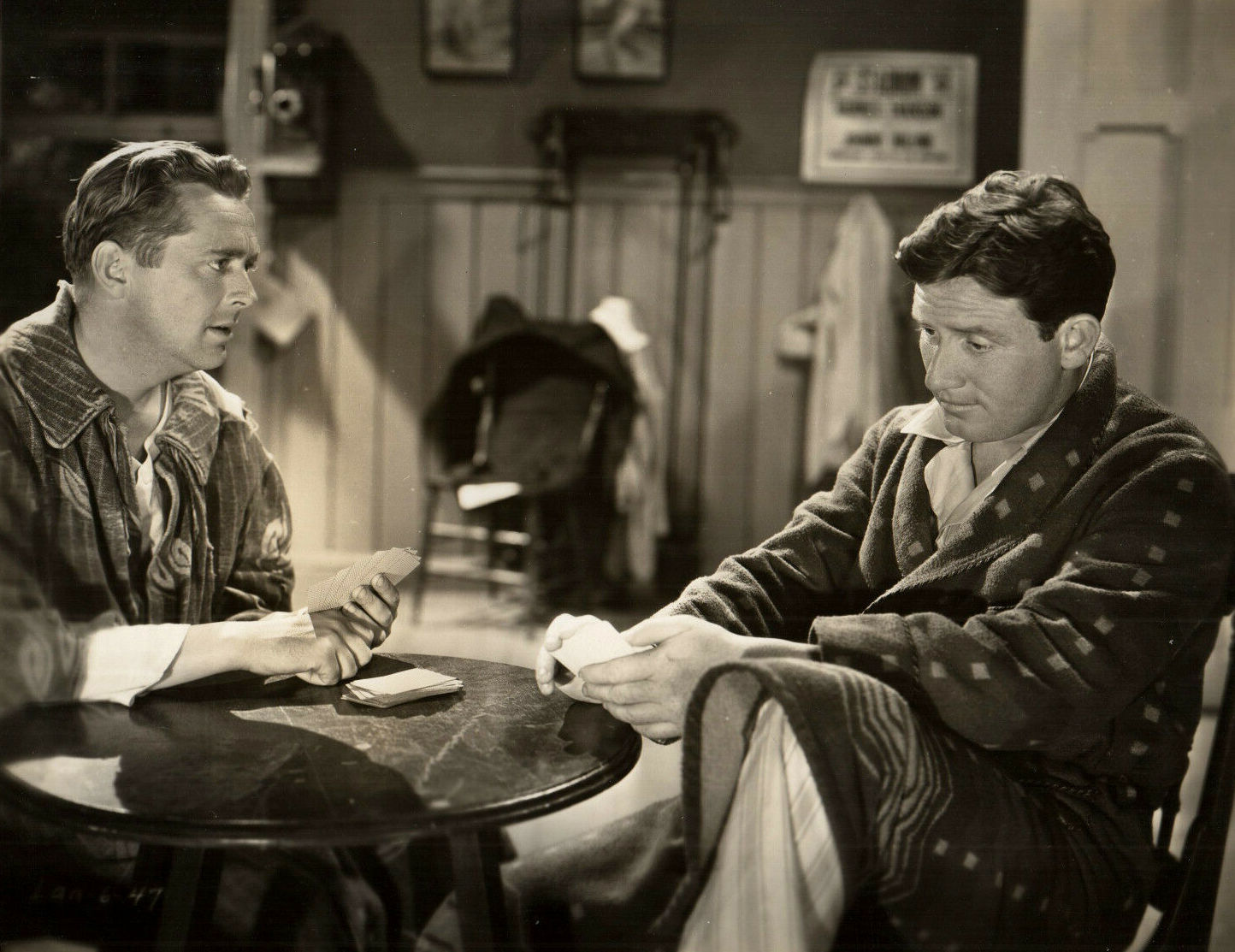
- James Dunn and Spencer Tracy in a scene from the film
- Directed by: Sidney Lanfield
- Produced by: William Fox
- Starring: James Dunn; Peggy Shannon; Spencer Tracy
- Cinematography: George Barnes
- Edited by: Margaret Clancey
- Distributed by: Fox Film Corporation
- Release date: November 7, 1932
- Country: United States
- Language: English

Society Girl is a 1932 American pre-Code film directed by Sidney Lanfield and starring James Dunn, Peggy Shannon and Spencer Tracy. The film presents a rare supporting role for Tracy, momentarily at the nadir of his career with Fox Film Corporation, who plays Briscoe, a boxer's frustrated manager. The picture was produced by William Fox, photographed by George Barnes, and edited by Margaret Clancey.

== Cast ==
- James Dunn as Johnny Malone
- Peggy Shannon as Judy Gelett
- Spencer Tracy as Briscoe
- Walter Byron as Warburton
- Bert Hanlon as Curly
- Marjorie Gateson as Alice Converse
- Eula Guy as Miss Halloway
