= Walls of Gold =

1933 film by Kenneth MacKenna

- Directed by: Kenneth MacKenna
- Written by: Lester Cole; Kathleen Norris; Edmond Seward; Wallace Sullivan
- Produced by: Sol M. Wurtzel
- Starring: Sally Eilers; Norman Foster; Ralph Morgan
- Cinematography: George Schneiderman
- Music by: Samuel Kaylin
- Production company: Fox Film Corporation
- Distributed by: Fox Film Corporation
- Release date: October 21, 1933
- Running time: 74 minutes
- Country: United States
- Language: English

Walls of Gold is a 1933 American pre-Code drama film directed by Kenneth MacKenna and starring Sally Eilers, Norman Foster, and Ralph Morgan.

== Cast ==
- Sally Eilers as Jeanie Satterlee Ritchie
- Norman Foster as Barnes Ritchie
- Ralph Morgan as J. Gordon Ritchie
- Rosita Moreno as Carla Monterez
- Rochelle Hudson as Joan Street
- Fred Santley as Tony Val Raalte
- Marjorie Gateson as Cassie Street
- Mary Mason as 'Honey' Satterlee
- Margaret Seddon as Mrs. Satterlee

== Bibliography ==
- Goble, Alan. The Complete Index to Literary Sources in Film. Walter de Gruyter, 1999.
