= Ralph Morgan =

American actor (1883–1956)

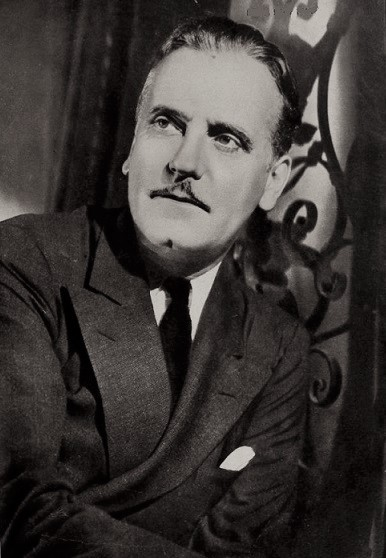
- Morgan in 1934
- Born: Raphael Kuhner Wuppermann; July 6, 1883; New York City, U.S.
- Died: June 11, 1956 (aged 72); New York City, U.S.
- Education: Columbia University
- Occupation: Actor
- Years active: 1908–1953
- Spouse: Grace Arnold (nee Georgiana Louise Iverson)
- Children: Claudia Morgan
- Relatives: Frank Morgan (brother)

President of the Screen Actors Guild
- In office 1938–1940
- Preceded by: Robert Montgomery
- Succeeded by: Edward Arnold
- In office 1933–1933
- Preceded by: Office established
- Succeeded by: Eddie Cantor

Acting President of the Actors' Equity Association
- In office June 17, 1924 – August 12, 1924
- Preceded by: John Emerson
- Succeeded by: John Emerson

Raphael Kuhner Wuppermann (July 6, 1883 – June 11, 1956), known professionally as Ralph Morgan, was a Hollywood stage and film character actor, and union activist. He was a brother of actor Frank Morgan as well as the father of actress Claudia Morgan.

== Early life ==
Morgan attended Trinity School, Riverview Military Academy and graduated from Columbia University with a law degree. However, after almost two years' practicing, he abandoned the world of jurisprudence for the vocation of journeyman actor, having already appeared in Columbia's annual Varsity Show. In 1905, billed as Raphael Kuhner Wupperman, he appeared in The Khan of Kathan, that year's variety show.

== Career ==
His first role on the stage came in The Bachelor in 1909 and, in 1913, he joined the Summer stock cast at Denver's Elitch Theatre. Later he played John Marvin in the 1918 hit play, Lightnin' . Morgan made his debut in silent films in 1915, appearing in several productions made on the East Coast. In the early talkie era, he played such leading roles in such productions as Strange Interlude in 1932 and Rasputin and the Empress also in 1932.

"I have great faith in the sense of justice inherent in my fellow player. I believe he wants to and will fight to correct any injustice so long as he feels confident that this fight will be waged cleanly and in keeping with the high calling of his profession."

— Ralph Morgan on the Screen Actors Guild and the professional etiquette between fellow thespians

A member of Equity in his younger days, Morgan was a founding member of the Screen Actors Guild. He would serve as its president twice.

One of his roles was in the 1942 serial Gang Busters, in which he played a brilliant surgeon turned master criminal. Morgan later worked in both radio and television, frequently in religious dramas filmed for Family Theater Productions.

== Recognition ==
Morgan has a star in the Motion Pictures section of the Hollywood Walk of Fame at 1617 Vine Street. It was dedicated February 8, 1960. The Screen Actors Guild honored Morgan by naming an award after him that is awarded by the L.A. Local Honors and Tributes Committee each year, with the inscription stating, "Devotion to the cause of actors, courage to fight for the right and sacrifice of self for others."

== Personal life and death ==
Morgan died on June 11, 1956, aged 72, of a lung ailment.

== Selected filmography ==
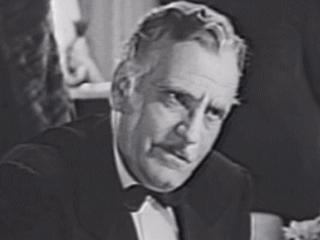
Morgan in The Monster Maker (1944)

- Seeds of Jealousy (1914) (film debut)
- The Man Trail (1915)
- The Master of the House (1915) as Young Hoffman - the Son
- Madame X (1916) as Raymond Floriot
- The Penny Philanthropist (1917) as Tom Oliphant
- The Man Who Found Himself (1925) as Edwin Macauley Jr
- Honor Among Lovers (1931) as Riggs
- Dance Team (1932) as Alex Prentice
- Charlie Chan's Chance (1932) as Barry Kirk
- Cheaters at Play (1932) as Freddie Isquith
- After Tomorrow (1932) as Dr. Sullivan (uncredited)
- Disorderly Conduct (1932) as James Crawford
- Devil's Lottery (1932) as Captain Geoffrey Maitland
- Strange Interlude (1932) as Charlie Marsden
- Jungle Mystery (1932, Serial) as Recap Narrator (voice, uncredited)
- Rasputin and the Empress (1932) as The Czar - Nicholai Alexander
- The Son-Daughter (1932) as Fang Fou Hy
- Humanity (1933) as Dr. William MacDonald
- Trick for Trick (1933) as Azrah
- Shanghai Madness (1933) as Li Po Chang
- The Power and the Glory (1933) as Henry
- Doctor Bull (1933) as Dr. Verney, Owner Verney Laboratory
- Walls of Gold (1933) as J. Gordon Ritchie
- The Mad Game (1933) as Judge Penfield
- The Kennel Murder Case (1933) as Raymond Wrede - the Secretary
- Orient Express (1934) as Dr. Richard Czinner
- Stand Up and Cheer! (1934) as Secretary to President
- The Last Gentleman (1934) as Henry Loring
- Their Big Moment (1934) as Dr. Portman
- She Was a Lady (1934) as Stanley Vane
- A Girl of the Limberlost (1934) as Wesley Sinton
- Transatlantic Merry-Go-Round (1934) as Herbert Rosson
- Hell in the Heavens (1934) as Lt. 'Pop' Roget
- Little Men (1934) as Professor Bhaer
- I've Been Around (1935) as John Waring
- The Unwelcome Stranger (1935) as Mike Monahan
- Star of Midnight (1935) as Roger Classon
- Calm Yourself (1935) as Mr. Kenneth S. Rockwell
- Condemned to Live (1935) as Prof. Paul Kristan
- Magnificent Obsession (1935) as Randolph
- Muss 'em Up (1936) as Jim Glenray, Paul's Brother in Law
- Speed (1936) as Mr. Dean
- The Ex-Mrs. Bradford (1936) as Leroy Hutchins, Warcloud's Owner
- Human Cargo (1936) as District Attorney Carey
- Little Miss Nobody (1936) as Gerald Dexter
- Anthony Adverse (1936) as Signore Debruille
- Yellowstone (1936) as James Foster / Anderson
- General Spanky (1936) as Yankee General
- Crack-Up (1936) as John R. Fleming
- The Man in Blue (1937) as The 'Professor'
- Exclusive (1937) as Horace Mitchell
- The Outer Gate (1937) as John Borden
- The Life of Emile Zola (1937) as Commander of Paris
- That's My Story (1937) as Carter
- Mannequin (1937) as Briggs
- Wells Fargo (1937) as Nicholas Pryor
- Love Is a Headache (1938) as Reginald 'Reggie' Odell
- Wives Under Suspicion (1938) as Shaw MacAllen
- Mother Carey's Chickens (1938) as Captain John Carey
- Barefoot Boy (1938) as John Hale
- Army Girl (1938) as Maj. Hal Kennett
- Shadows Over Shanghai (1938) as Howard Barclay
- Out West with the Hardys (1938) as Bill Northcote
- Orphans of the Street (1938) as Martin Sands
- The Lone Wolf Spy Hunt (1939) as Spiro
- Fast and Loose (1939) as Nicholas Torrent
- Man of Conquest (1939) as Stephen F. Austin
- Trapped in the Sky (1939) as Colonel Whalen
- Way Down South (1939) as Timothy Reid Sr.
- Smuggled Cargo (1939) as John Clayton
- Geronimo (1939) as Gen. Steele
- Forty Little Mothers (1940) as Judge Joseph M. Williams
- I'm Still Alive (1940) as Producer Walter Blake
- The Mad Doctor (1941) as Dr. Charles Downer
- Adventure in Washington (1941) as Senator Cummings
- Dick Tracy vs. Crime, Inc. (1941, Serial) as J.P. Morton
- A Close Call for Ellery Queen (1942) as Alan Rogers
- Klondike Fury (1942) as Dr. Brady
- Gang Busters (1942, Serial) as Dr. Clayton Maxton - aka Prof. Mortis
- A Gentleman After Dark (1942) as Morrison
- Night Monster (1942) as Kurt Ingston
- The Traitor Within (1942) as John Scott Ryder
- Hitler's Madman (1943) as Jan Hanka
- Stage Door Canteen (1943) as Ralph Morgan
- Jack London (1943) as George Brett
- The Impostor (aka Strange Confession) (1944) as Col. DeBoivin
- Weird Woman (1944) as Prof. Millard Sawtelle
- The Monster Maker (1944) as Lawrence
- Trocadero (1944) as Sam Wallace
- The Great Alaskan Mystery (1944, Serial) as Dr. Miller
- Enemy of Women (1944) as Mr. Quandt
- The Monster and the Ape (1945, Serial) as Professor Franklin Arnold
- Hollywood and Vine (1945) as B.B. Lavish / Richard Lavish
- This Love of Ours (1945) as Dr. Lane
- Black Market Babies (1945) as Dr. Henry Jordon
- Mr. District Attorney (1947) as Ed Jamison
- Song of the Thin Man (1947) as David I. Thayar
- The Last Round-up (1947) as Charlie Mason
- Sleep, My Love (1948) as Dr. Rhinehart
- Sword of the Avenger (1948) as Don Adolfo Rivera
- The Creeper (1948) as Dr. Lester Cavigny
- Blue Grass of Kentucky (1950) as Maj. Randolph McIvor
- Heart of the Rockies (1951) as Andrew Willard
- Gold Fever (1952) as Nugget Jack (final film)
