= Bad Boy (1935 film) =

1935 film by John G. Blystone

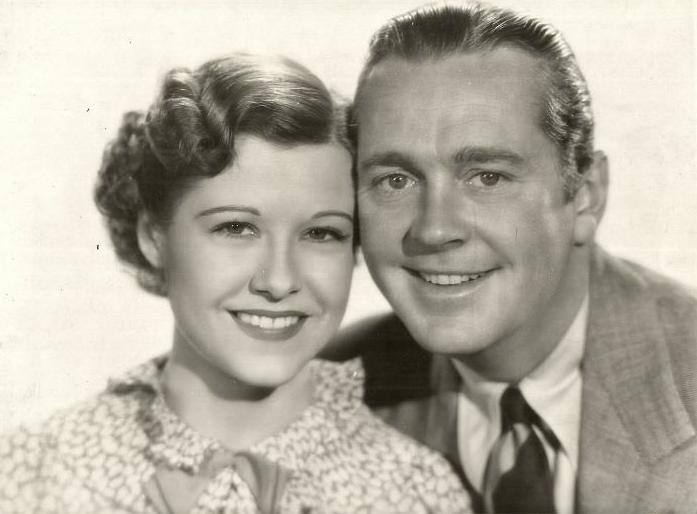
- Press photo of Dorothy Wilson and James Dunn
- Directed by: John G. Blystone
- Screenplay by: Allen Rivkin
- Produced by: Edward Butcher
- Starring: James Dunn; Dorothy Wilson; Louise Fazenda; Victor Kilian; John Wray; Luis Alberni
- Cinematography: Bert Glennon
- Edited by: Margaret Clancey
- Music by: Arthur Lange
- Production company: Fox Film Corporation
- Distributed by: 20th Century-Fox
- Release date: October 25, 1935
- Running time: 56 minutes
- Country: United States
- Language: English

Bad Boy is a 1935 American comedy film directed by John G. Blystone and written by Allen Rivkin. The film stars James Dunn, Dorothy Wilson, Louise Fazenda, Victor Kilian, John Wray and Luis Alberni. The film was released on October 25, 1935, by 20th Century-Fox.

== Plot ==
Cynical Eddie spends most of his time hustling suckers at the pool hall, much to the dismay of his girlfriend, Sally. Her mother and stepfather disapprove of Eddie's lifestyle and lack of steady employment and demand that the two stop seeing each other. Instead, the couple secretly marry, but Eddie, despite his best efforts, has trouble finding a job. He becomes increasingly desperate, and eventually is on the verge of giving up entirely.

== Cast ==
- James Dunn as Eddie Nolan
- Dorothy Wilson as Sally Larkin
- Louise Fazenda as Mrs. Harris
- Victor Kilian as Sid
- John Wray as Fred Larkin
- Luis Alberni as Tony
- Beulah Bondi as Mrs. Larkin
- Allen Vincent as Bob Carey
