= Hold That Girl =

1934 film

- Theatrical release poster
- Directed by: Hamilton MacFadden
- Screenplay by: Dudley Nichols; Lamar Trotti
- Starring: James Dunn; Claire Trevor; Alan Edwards; Gertrude Michael; John Davidson; Robert McWade
- Cinematography: George Schneiderman
- Music by: David Buttolph
- Production company: Fox Film Corporation
- Distributed by: Fox Film Corporation
- Release date: March 24, 1934
- Running time: 66 minutes
- Country: United States
- Language: English

Hold That Girl is a 1934 American comedy film directed by Hamilton MacFadden and written by Dudley Nichols and Lamar Trotti. The film stars James Dunn, Claire Trevor, Alan Edwards, Gertrude Michael, John Davidson and Robert McWade. The film was released on March 24, 1934, by Fox Film Corporation.

== Cast ==
- James Dunn as Barney Sullivan
- Claire Trevor as Tonie Bellamy
- Alan Edwards as Tom Mallory
- Gertrude Michael as Dorothy Lamont
- John Davidson as Ackroyd
- Robert McWade as McCloy
- Effie Ellsler as Grandmother
- Jay Ward as Warren
