= Dance Team (film) =

1932 film

- Theatrical release poster
- Directed by: Sidney Lanfield
- Screenplay by: Edwin J. Burke
- Starring: James Dunn; Sally Eilers; Ralph Morgan; Minna Gombell; Edward Crandall; Nora Lane
- Cinematography: James Wong Howe
- Edited by: Margaret Clancey
- Production company: Fox Film Corporation
- Distributed by: Fox Film Corporation
- Release date: January 15, 1932
- Running time: 76 minutes
- Country: United States
- Language: English

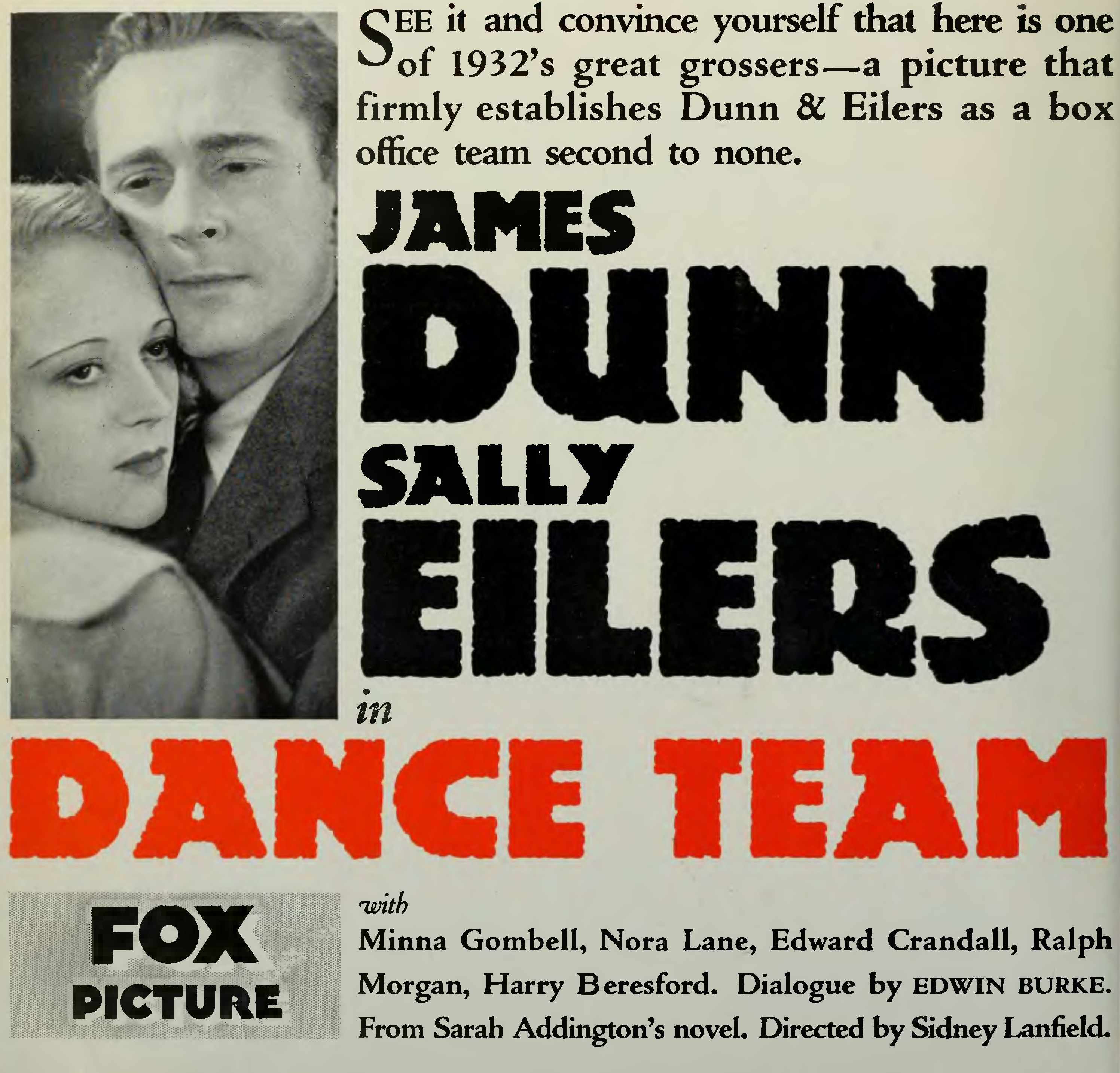
Dance Team ad in The Film Daily, 1932

Dance Team is a 1932 American Pre-Code comedy film directed by Sidney Lanfield and written by Edwin J. Burke. The film stars James Dunn, Sally Eilers, Ralph Morgan, Minna Gombell, Edward Crandall and Nora Lane. The film was released on January 15, 1932, by Fox Film Corporation.

== Cast ==
- James Dunn as Jimmy Mulligan
- Sally Eilers as Poppy Kirk
- Ralph Morgan as Alex Prentice
- Minna Gombell as Cora Stuart
- Edward Crandall as Fred Penworthy
- Nora Lane as Jane Boyden
- Harry Beresford as Herbert Wilson
- Charles Williams as Benny Weber

== Critical reception ==
The Film Daily praised the performances of Dunn and Eilers and wrote that the film should increase their popularity. It continued, "It is easily the best of all the many stories of hoofers that have reached the screen. Their characterizations are well rounded, and the story has the knack of tugging at the heart strings and bringing a laugh at the same time."
