= Square Crooks =

1928 film

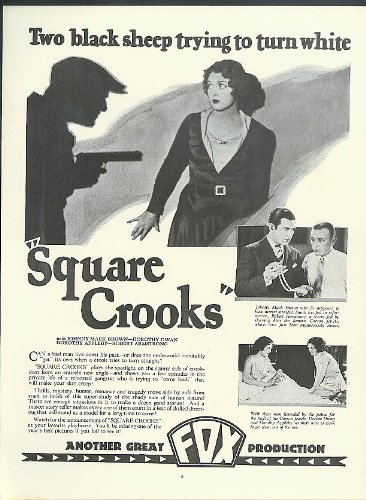
- Directed by: Lewis Seiler
- Written by: Malcolm Stuart Boylan; Becky Gardiner; James P. Judge (play)
- Produced by: Philip Klein
- Starring: Robert Armstrong; Johnny Mack Brown; Dorothy Dwan
- Cinematography: Rudolph J. Bergquist
- Edited by: Jack Dennis
- Production company: Fox Film
- Distributed by: Fox Film
- Release date: March 4, 1928
- Country: United States
- Languages: Silent; English intertitles

Square Crooks is a 1928 American silent comedy drama film directed by Lewis Seiler and starring Robert Armstrong, Johnny Mack Brown and Dorothy Dwan. The screenplay is based on the 1926 play Square Crooks by James P. Judge. The screenplay was rewritten and made as the sound film Baby Take a Bow in 1934.

== Premise ==
After being released from jail, two former criminals attempt to go straight. They manages to land jobs as chauffeurs for a wealthy family, but a vindictive detective is not convinced they have given up crime and tries to arrest them for stealing jewels.

== Cast ==
- Robert Armstrong as Eddie Ellison
- Johnny Mack Brown as Larry Scott
- Dorothy Dwan as Jane Brown
- Dorothy Appleby as Kay Ellison
- Eddie Sturgis as Mike Ross
- Clarence Burton as Harry Welsh
- Jackie Combs as Phillip Carson

== Bibliography ==
- Solomon, Aubrey. The Fox Film Corporation, 1915-1935: A History and Filmography. McFarland, 2011.
