= Hold Me Tight (1933 film) =

1933 film

- Directed by: David Butler
- Screenplay by: Gladys Lehman
- Starring: James Dunn; Sally Eilers; Frank McHugh; June Clyde
- Cinematography: Arthur C. Miller
- Edited by: Irene Morra
- Music by: R.H. Bassett
- Production company: Fox Film Corporation
- Distributed by: Fox Film Corporation
- Release date: May 20, 1933
- Running time: 72 minutes
- Country: United States
- Language: English

Hold Me Tight is a 1933 American pre-Code drama film directed by David Butler and written by Gladys Lehman. The film stars James Dunn, Sally Eilers, Frank McHugh and June Clyde. The film was released on May 20, 1933, by Fox Film Corporation.

== Plot ==
Chuck and Molly are workers in a department store and get married. She plans to quit her job, only to discover that Dolan the malicious store detective who had designs on her, has arranged to have Chuck fired. Molly now has to support her husband on her pay from the store as he struggles to find a job.

== Cast ==
- James Dunn as Chuck
- Sally Eilers as Molly
- Frank McHugh as Billy
- June Clyde as Dottie
- Clay Clement as Blair
- Noel Francis as Trudie
- Dorothy Peterson as Mary Shane
- Kenneth Thomson as Dolan

== Bibliography ==
- Solomon, Aubrey. The Fox Film Corporation, 1915-1935. A History and Filmography. McFarland & Co, 2011.
