= Sally Eilers =

American actress (1908–1978)

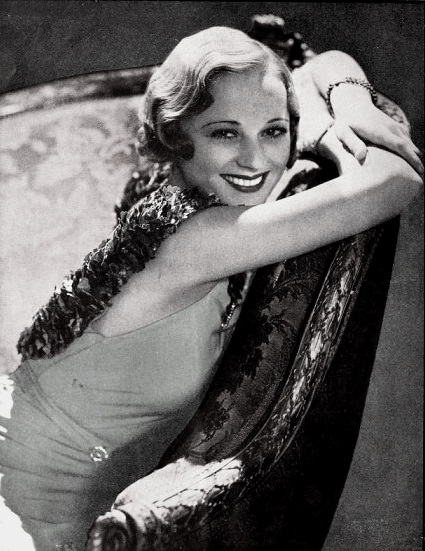
- Eilers in 1933
- Born: Dorothea Sally Eilers; December 11, 1908; New York City, U.S.
- Died: January 5, 1978 (aged 69); Woodland Hills, California, U.S.
- Resting place: Forest Lawn Memorial Park, Glendale, California
- Education: Fairfax High School
- Occupation: Actress
- Years active: 1927–1950
- Known for: Quick Millions; The Black Camel
- Spouses: Hoot Gibson (m. 1930; div. 1933) Harry Joe Brown (m. 1933; div. 1943) Howard Barney (m. 1943; div. 1946) Hollingsworth Morse (m. 1949; div. 1958)
- Children: 1

Dorothea Sally Eilers (December 11, 1908 – January 5, 1978) was an American actress.

== Early life ==
Eilers was born in New York City to a Jewish-American mother, Paula (or Pauline) Schoenberger, and a German-American father, Hio Peter Eilers (an inventor). She had one sibling, a brother, Hio Peter Eilers Jr. When Eilers was young, she moved to Los Angeles with her parents, and in 1927 she graduated from Fairfax High School.

== Career ==
She made her film debut in 1927 in The Red Mill, directed by Roscoe "Fatty" Arbuckle. After several minor roles as an extra, in 1927–1928 she found work with Mack Sennett as one of his "flaming youth" comedians in several comedy short subjects, along with Carole Lombard, who had been a school friend. In 1928, she was chosen as one of the WAMPAS Baby Stars, a yearly list of young actresses selected for having "shown the most promise during the past 12 months."

Eilers was a popular figure in early-1930s Hollywood, known for her high spirits and vivacity. Her films were mostly comedies and crime melodramas such as Quick Millions (1931) with Spencer Tracy and George Raft. By the end of the decade, her popularity had waned, and her subsequent film appearances were few. She made her final film appearance in Stage to Tucson (1950).

== Personal life ==
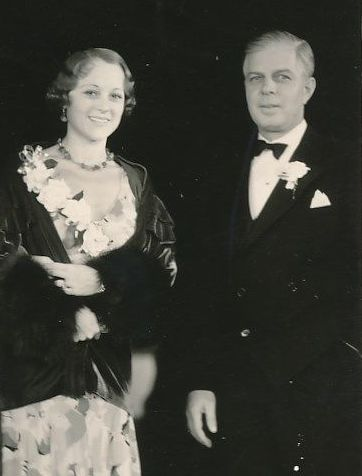
Eilers and Hoot Gibson in 1951

She was married four times, beginning with Western actor Hoot Gibson. She and her second husband, Harry Joe Brown, had one child, a son, Harry Joe Brown Jr. (1934–2006). She lived in a mansion in Beverly Hills, California designed by architect Paul R. Williams.

== Death ==
During her final years, Eilers suffered poor health, and died from a heart attack on January 5, 1978, in Woodland Hills, California, at the age of 69. She was cremated and her remains were interred in a small niche in the Freedom Mausoleum, Columbarium of Understanding, Forest Lawn Memorial Park Cemetery, Glendale, California.

== Partial filmography ==
- The Red Mill (1927) (uncredited)
- Sunrise: A Song of Two Humans (1927)
- Paid to Love (1927)
- The Cradle Snatchers (1927)
- The Campus Vamp (1928) (short subject)
- Fazil (1928)
- The Good-Bye Kiss (1928)
- The Crowd (1928)
- Dry Martini (1928)
- Broadway Babies (1929)
- Weary River (1929)
- Sailor's Holiday (1929)
- The Long Long Trail (1929)
- The Show of Shows (1929)
- She Couldn't Say No (1930)
- Let Us Be Gay (1930)
- Doughboys (1930)
- Trigger Tricks (1930)
- Roaring Ranch (1930)
- Clearing the Range (1931)
- Parlor, Bedroom and Bath (1931)
- Quick Millions (1931)
- The Black Camel (1931)
- A Holy Terror (1931)
- Over the Hill (1931)
- Reducing (1931)
- Bad Girl (1931)
- Disorderly Conduct (1932)
- Hat Check Girl (1932)
- Hold Me Tight (1933)
- Made on Broadway (1933)
- Sailor's Luck (1933)
- Second Hand Wife (1933)
- Central Airport (1933)
- State Fair (1933)
- Walls of Gold (1933)
- She Made Her Bed (1934)
- Three on a Honeymoon (1934)
- I Spy (1934)
- Pursuit (1935)
- Alias Mary Dow (1935)
- Carnival (1935)
- Remember Last Night? (1935)
- Don't Get Personal (1936)
- Florida Special (1936)
- Talk of the Devil (1936) (British)
- Without Orders (1936)
- Strike Me Pink (1936)
- Danger Patrol (1937)
- We Have Our Moments (1937)
- Lady Behave! (1937)
- Tarnished Angel (1938)
- Condemned Women (1938)
- Everybody's Doing It (1938)
- The Nurse from Brooklyn (1938)
- Full Confession (1939)
- They Made Her a Spy (1939)
- I Was a Prisoner on Devil's Island (1941)
- First Aid (1943) (short subject)
- A Wave, a WAC and a Marine (1944)
- Strange Illusion (1945)
- Coroner Creek (1948)
- Stage to Tucson (1950)
