= Baby Take a Bow =

1934 American comedy-drama film directed by Harry Lachman

- Theatrical release poster
- Directed by: Harry Lachman
- Written by: John V. A. Weaver; William Conselman; Henry Johnson
- Screenplay by: Philip Klein; Edward E. Paramore Jr.
- Based on: Square Crooks; 1926 play by James P. Judge
- Produced by: John Stone
- Starring: Shirley Temple; James Dunn; Claire Trevor; Alan Dinehart
- Cinematography: L. William O'Connell
- Edited by: Alfred DeGaetano; Al De Gaetano
- Music by: Samuel Kaylin; David Buttolph
- Production company: Fox Film Corporation
- Distributed by: Fox Film Corporation
- Release date: June 30, 1934
- Running time: 76 minutes
- Country: United States
- Language: English
- Budget: $183,000
- Box office: $1,134,000

Baby Take a Bow (sometimes written as Baby, take a Bow, etc. in promotional posters at the time) is a 1934 American comedy-drama film directed by Harry Lachman and is one of the earliest Hays code Hollywood films (its MPAA certificate marks it as the third ever code-approved film). The screenplay by Philip Klein and Edward E. Paramore Jr. is based on the 1926 play Square Crooks by James P. Judge. Shirley Temple plays the child of an ex-convict (James Dunn) trying to make a better life for himself and his family. The film was a commercial success and is critically regarded as pleasant and sentimental. A musical number features Dunn and Temple.

== Plot ==
After serving time in Sing Sing, Eddie Ellison (James Dunn) marries his fiancée Kay (Claire Trevor) and eventually the two have a daughter they name Shirley (Shirley Temple). Eddie helps his friend, and former convict, Larry Scott (Ray Walker), who is engaged to Shirley's dance instructor Jane (Dorothy Libaire), get a job as a chauffeur for his employer, factory owner Stuart Carson (Richard Tucker).

Trigger Stone (Ralf Harolde), who also served time in Sing Sing, steals Mrs. Carson's (Olive Tell) pearl necklace and asks Eddie and Larry to sell it for him, but they refuse. Private investigator Welch (Alan Dinehart), the man responsible for Eddie's conviction, tells the head of the National Insurance Company he suspects the chauffeurs are guilty of the robbery and informs Mr. Carson about their prison records, prompting him to fire them.

Trying to escape from the police, Trigger gives the pearl necklace to Shirley, who believes it is a belated birthday present. As part of a game, she hides it in her father's pocket, and when he finds it while Welch is searching the apartment, he conceals it in the carpet sweeper, but unbeknownst to him, the neighbor's maid Anna (Lillian Stuart) borrows and empties it before returning it. Kay returns home, and when she hears the story, they try to open the sweeper. Welch returns and opens it himself, only to find it empty.

After Welch leaves, Eddie, Larry, Kay and Jane search the apartment building for the necklace. When Trigger threatens Eddie with a gun, Eddie subdues him and ties him up, then goes for the police. During his absence, Shirley discovers the necklace in the garbage can downstairs. She brings it to Eddie but instead finds Trigger, who convinces her to let him free. He takes her hostage and climbs to the roof, where he shoots Eddie. Although injured, Eddie manages to capture Trigger. Shirley takes the necklace from Trigger's pocket, and detective Flannigan (James Flavin) tells her she will be eligible for the $5,000 reward.

== Cast ==
- Shirley Temple as Shirley Ellison, Eddie & Kay's 6-year-old daughter
- James Dunn as Eddie Ellison, Kay's husband & Shirley's father
- Claire Trevor as Kay Ellison, Eddie's wife & Shirley's mother & Jane's best friend
- Alan Dinehart as Welch
- Ray Walker as Larry Scott, Eddie's best friend & Jane's boyfriend
- Dorothy Libaire as Jane Scott, Larry's girlfriend & Kay's best friend
- Ralf Harolde as Trigger Stone
- James Flavin as Det. Flannigan
- Richard Tucker as Stuart Carson
- Olive Tell as Mrs. Carson

== Production ==
Title card

James P. Judge's play Square Crooks was filmed under that title in 1928 by Lewis Seiler. The working titles for the remake were Always Honest and Going Straight. Both The Hollywood Reporter and Variety reported the film was banned in Nazi Germany, although no reason was given by the German censors.

The song "On Account-a I Love You" was written by Sam H. Stept and Bud Green and sung by Temple and Dunn. The dress that Temple wore on film while singing this song was part of a 2015 exhibition, Love, Shirley Temple. The exhibition, which toured among several US locations, also included other dresses Temple wore between 1928 and 1941 as well as other memorabilia from this time. Items from the exhibition were auctioned off in July 2015 and this dress sold for $52,000.

== Release ==
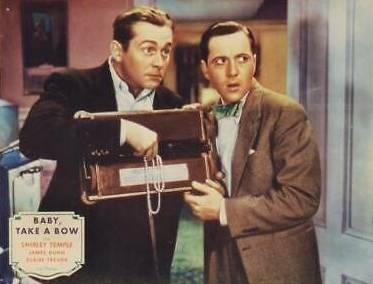
Lobby card featuring James Dunn and Ray Walker

The film was one of Fox's biggest hits of the year.

== Critical reception ==
Channel 4 called the film a "slender but cute tale" that is "slow for the most part, but a scene on a rooftop where the real baddie uses the tot as a human shield should amuse."

TV Guide rated the film two out of four stars and commented, "Forget the plot and enjoy the child star in one of her most entertaining roles."

== Home media ==
In 2009, the film was available on videocassette and DVD in both the original black and white and in computer-colorized versions. Some editions had special features and theatrical trailers.
