= Yakima Canutt filmography =

Yakima Canutt (November 29, 1895 – May 24, 1986) was an American rodeo rider, actor, stuntman and action director who developed many stunt riding techniques while introducing safety measures and devices of his own design; and either directed, coordinated stunts or appeared in over 300 films:

== Filmography ==
Title	Year	Crew	Stunts	Actor	Notes
Foreman of Bar Z Ranch	1915		stunts		Uncredited
Lightning Bryce	1919			Deputy	Serial, Ep. 15, Uncredited
The Girl Who Dared	1920			Bob Purdy	
The Heart of a Texan	1922			Link	
The Forbidden Range	1923			Buck Madison	
Days of '49	1924				
Sell 'Em Cowboy	1924			Luke Strong	
Ridin' Mad	1924			Steve Carlson	
The Desert Hawk	1924			Handy Man	
The Riddle Rider	1924				
Branded a Bandit	1924		stunts, uncredited	Jess Dean	
The Cactus Cure	1925			Bud Osborne	
Romance and Rustlers	1925			Bud Kane	
Scar Hanan	1925	story		Scar Hanan	
A Two-Fisted Sheriff	1925			Jerry O'Connell	
The Riding Comet	1925			Slim Ranthers	
Wolves of the Road	1925			The Pronto Kid	
White Thunder	1925			Chick Richards	
The Mystery Box	1925			Whipping boss	
The Human Tornado	1925			Jim Marlow	
The Strange Rider	1925			Jim Weston	
Wild Horse Canyon	1925				Uncredited
The Devil Horse	1926	second unit director	stunts, uncredited	Dave Carson	
Desert Greed	1926	producer		Yak Carroll	
The Outlaw Breaker	1926	producer; writer		Yak Darnell	
The Iron Rider	1926	producer		Yak Halliday	
King of the Rodeo	1926	producer			Uncredited
Hell Hounds of the Plains	1926			Yak Hammond	
The Fighting Stallion	1927			Yak	
Pals of the West	1927				Uncredited
The Vanishing West	1928			Steve Marvin	
The King of the Kongo	1929		stunts		Uncredited
The Three Outcasts	1929			Dick Marsh	
Bad Men's Money	1929		stunts, uncredited	Jim Donovan	
Captain Cowboy	1929				
Riders of the Storm	1929				
A Texan's Honor	1929			Bob Morgan	
Firebrand Jordan	1930		stunts, uncredited	Red Carson	
Bar-L Ranch	1930		stunts, uncredited	Steve	
The Cheyenne Kid	1930	story	stunt double, uncredited	Marshal Utah Kane	
The Texan	1930			Cowboy	Uncredited
Ridin' Law	1930			Buck Lambert	
The Lonesome Trail	1930			Two-Gun	
Canyon Hawks	1930			Jack Benson	
Breed of the West	1930		stunt double	Cowhand	Uncredited
Westward Bound	1930			Gang leader Jim	
Freighters of Destiny	1931		stunts		Uncredited
Sundown Trail	1931		stunt double		Uncredited
The Phantom of the West	1931		stunts		Uncredited
Pueblo Terror	1931		stunt double, uncredited	Ballen, crooked Foreman	
The Vanishing Legion	1931		stunt double, uncredited	Yak / Bill Peters	Serial, [Chs. 1 & 3] / [Ch. 4]
The Galloping Ghost	1931		stunts	Henchman	Serial, Uncredited
The Hurricane Horseman	1931		stunt double: Lane Chandler, uncredited	Sheriff Jones	
Two Fisted Justice	1931		stunt double, uncredited	Perkins	
The Lightning Warrior	1931		stunt double: George Brent	Ken Davis / Deputy	Serial, [Ch. 3] / [Ch. 8], Uncredited
Battling with Buffalo Bill	1931	second unit director, uncredited		Scout Jack Brady	
The Cheyenne Cyclone	1931		stunt double uncredited	Henchman Ed Brady	
Beyond the Rockies	1932		stunt double		Uncredited
Come on Danger!	1932		stunts		Uncredited
Ghost Valley	1932		stunt double		Uncredited
Lawless Valley	1932		stunt double: Lane Chandler		Uncredited
Partners	1932		stunt double		Uncredited
Renegades of the West	1932		stunt double		Uncredited
The Black Ghost	1932			Wild Bill, Indian scout	(archive footage)
The Reckless Rider	1932		stunt double		Uncredited
The Saddle Buster	1932		stunt double		Uncredited
The Texan	1932		stunt double		Uncredited
Vanishing Men	1932		stunts		Uncredited
Riders of the Golden Gulch	1932	story	stunts		Uncredited
The Shadow of the Eagle	1932		stunts, uncredited	Henchman Boyle	
Battling Buckaroo	1932		stunts, uncredited	Sheriff Rawlins	
The Texas Tornado	1932			Henchman Jackson	
The Last of the Mohicans	1932			Black Fox, messenger / bullion wagon driver	Serial, [Ch.1] / [Ch.6]
The Hurricane Express	1932		stunts	Henchman	Uncredited
Guns for Hire	1932		stunts, uncredited	Sheriff Pete Peterson	
The Last Frontier	1932		stunt double: Lon Chaney, Jr, uncredited	Wild Bill Hickok	Serial, [Chs. 1-2]
The Devil Horse	1932			Slim / Henchman	Serial, [Chs. 3-4, 8] / [Chs. 11-12], Uncredited
Law and Lawless	1932		stunt double: Tex Barnes, uncredited	Tex Barnes	
The Wyoming Whirlwind	1932		stunts, uncredited	Buck Jackson	
Cross Fire	1933		stunt double		Uncredited
King of the Wild Horses	1933		stunts: Horses		Uncredited
Laughing at Life	1933		stunt double: Victor McLaglen		Uncredited
The Cheyenne Kid	1933		stunt double		Uncredited
The Mystery Squadron	1933		stunts		Uncredited
Via Pony Express	1933	stunt double		Henchman	Uncredited
Scarlet River	1933		stunt double: Tom Keene and Lon Chaney, Jr.	Yak, a Wrangler	
The Telegraph Trail	1933		stunts, uncredited	High Wolf	
The Three Musketeers	1933		stunts	El Shaitan, when masked / Legion Officer	Serial, [Ch. 8], Uncredited
The Whispering Shadow	1933		stunt coordinator	Detective	Serial, [Ch. 12], Uncredited
Son of the Border	1933		stunt double: Tom Keene	Yak	Uncredited
Fighting Texans	1933		stunts, uncredited	Henchman Joe	
Fighting with Kit Carson	1933		stunts	Mystery Rider	Uncredited
The Wolf Dog	1933		stunt coordinator, uncredited	Bill	
Riders of Destiny	1933		stunt double: John Wayne, uncredited	Henchman	
Sagebrush Trail	1933		stunt double: John Wayne, uncredited	Ed Walsh, Outlaw Gang Leader	
Burn 'Em Up Barnes	1934		stunt coordinator		Uncredited
Elinor Norton	1934		stunts		Uncredited
Mystery Mountain	1934		stunts		Serial, Uncredited
Range Riders	1934		stunts		Uncredited
The Lost Jungle	1934		stunts		Uncredited
The Sundown Trail	1934		stunts		Uncredited
The Trail Beyond	1934		stunts		Uncredited
Wild Gold	1934	stunt double	stunt double		Uncredited
The Lucky Texan	1934		stunt double: John Wayne, uncredited	Joe Cole	
West of the Divide	1934		stunt double: John Wayne, uncredited	Hank Gentry Henchman	
Blue Steel	1934		stunt double: John Wayne	Danti, the Polka Dot Bandit	
The Man from Utah	1934		stunts, uncredited	Cheyenne Kent	
Monte Carlo Nights	1934		stunts	Casino Hood	Uncredited
Randy Rides Alone	1934		stunt double uncredited	Henchman Spike	
Carrying the Mail	1934		stunts, uncredited	Shank outlaw gang leader	Short
The Man from Hell	1934		stunts, uncredited	Yak Henchman	
Desert Man	1934		stunts, uncredited	Outlaw Spade	Short
Fighting Through	1934		stunts, uncredited	Big Jack Thorne	
The Star Packer	1934		stunts, uncredited	Yak, Travers' Indian Sidekick	
Pals of the West	1934		stunt double, uncredited	Larkin	Short
The Law of the Wild	1934		stunts	Townsman	Uncredited
The Lawless Frontier	1934		stunt double: John Wayne, uncredited	Joe, Zanti's Henchman	
'Neath the Arizona Skies	1934		stunts, uncredited	Sam Black	
Between Men	1935		stunts		
Big Calibre	1935		stunts		Uncredited, (archive footage)
Texas Terror	1935		stunts, stunt double		Uncredited
The Courageous Avenger	1935		stunts		Uncredited, (archive footage)
The Cowboy and the Bandit	1935		stunts		Uncredited
The Cyclone Ranger	1935		stunt double		Uncredited
The Desert Trail	1935		stunts		Uncredited, (archive footage)
The Farmer Takes a Wife	1935		stunt		Uncredited
The Fighting Marines	1935	second unit director, uncredited	stunts		Uncredited
The Last Days of Pompeii	1935		stunts		Uncredited
The New Frontier	1935		stunt double		Uncredited
Welcome Home	1935		stunts		Uncredited
Outlaw Rule	1935		stunts, uncredited	Blaze Tremaine	
Pals of the Range	1935		stunts, uncredited	Henchman Brown	
Cyclone of the Saddle	1935		stunts, uncredited	Snake	
The Miracle Rider	1935		stunt double	Indian chief	Uncredited
Circle of Death	1935	director, uncredited	stunt coordinator	Young Brave	
The Dawn Rider	1935		stunts, uncredited	Saloon Owner	
Branded a Coward	1935		stunts, uncredited	'The Cat' original	
Paradise Canyon	1935		stunts, uncredited	Curly Joe Gale	
Dante's Inferno	1935			Stoker on the Paradise	Uncredited
Westward Ho	1935			Red Ballard henchman	
Rough Riding Ranger	1935		stunts, uncredited	Henchman Draw	
Lawless Range	1935		stunts, uncredited	Joe Burns, chief henchman	
Darkest Africa	1936		stunts		Uncredited
Oh, Susanna!	1936		stunts		Uncredited
The Charge of the Light Brigade	1936		stunt double: Errol Flynn		Uncredited
The Lawless Nineties	1936		stunt double: John Wayne		Uncredited
The Three Mesquiteers	1936		stunts		Uncredited
The Trail of the Lonesome Pine	1936		stunts		Uncredited
Custer's Last Stand	1936		stunts	Renegade / Indian	Serial, Uncredited
The Oregon Trail	1936		stunt double, uncredited	Tom Richards	
King of the Pecos	1936			Henchman Pete	
The Clutching Hand	1936		stunt double, uncredited,	Number Eight, garage-owner / chauffeur thug	
The Lonely Trail	1936			Trooper Bull Horrell	
Wildcat Trooper	1936			The Raven	
Winds of the Wasteland	1936		stunts	Henchman Smokey	Uncredited
The Vigilantes Are Coming	1936		stunt double: Robert Livingston and others, uncredited	Henchman Barsam	Serial, [Ch. 1]
The Black Coin	1936		stunts, uncredited	Ed McMahan thug	Serial, [Chs. 3,10-14]
Trailin' West	1936		stunts	Gambler	Uncredited
Ghost-Town Gold	1936		stunts, uncredited	Buck Barrington's Henchman	
The Big Show	1936			Driver of Cattle Truck	Uncredited
The Bold Caballero	1936		stunt double	Murdered Peon / Soldier	Uncredited
Ten Laps to Go	1936		stunts, uncredited	Barney Smith - Henchman	
Roarin' Lead	1936		stunt double: Ray Corrigan, uncredited	Henchman Canary	
Ali Baba Goes to Town	1937		stunts		Uncredited
Riders of the Dawn	1937		stunts		Uncredited
Rootin' Tootin' Rhythm	1937		stunts		Uncredited
Yodelin' Kid from Pine Ridge	1937		stunts		Uncredited
Zorro Rides Again	1937		stunt double: John Carroll		Uncredited
Riders of the Whistling Skull	1937		stunt double: Ray Corrigan, uncredited	Otah	
Hit the Saddle	1937		stunt double, uncredited	Buck - McGowan Henchman	
Trouble in Texas	1937		stunt double, uncredited, archive footage	Henchman Squint Palmer	
Nancy Steele Is Missing!	1937			Convict in Prison Break	Uncredited
Gunsmoke Ranch	1937			Henchman Spider	
Come On, Cowboys	1937		stunt coordinator, uncredited	Henchman Jake	
The Painted Stallion	1937		stunt double: Ray Corrigan and LeRoy Mason, uncredited	Tom	
It Could Happen to You!	1937			Truck Driver	Uncredited
Range Defenders	1937			Henchman Hodge	
Riders of the Rockies	1937			Arizona Ranger Sergeant Beef	
S.O.S. Coast Guard	1937		stunts	Seaman	Uncredited
Heart of the Rockies	1937			Charlie Coe, Dawson henchman	
Prairie Thunder	1937			Chief High Wolf	
Conquest	1937			Cossack	Uncredited
The Mysterious Pilot	1937		stunt double, uncredited	Indian Luke	Serial, [Chs.1-2,4-8,15]
In Old Chicago	1938		stunts		Uncredited
Army Girl	1938		stunt coordinator		Uncredited
Call the Mesquiteers	1938		stunts		Uncredited, (archive footage)
Dick Tracy Returns	1938		stunts		Uncredited
Frontier Town	1938		stunts		Uncredited, (archive footage)
Red River Range	1938		stunts		Uncredited
Riders of the Black Hills	1938		stunts		Uncredited
The Lone Ranger	1938		stunts		Serial, Uncredited
The Mexicali Kid	1938		stunts		Uncredited, (archive footage)
The Painted Stallion	1938		stunt double	Tom	(archive footage)
The Painted Trail	1938		stunts		Uncredited, (archive footage)
Hollywood Stadium Mystery	1938		stunts	Photographer	Uncredited
The Secret of Treasure Island	1938		stunts, uncredited	Dreer Mole-Men Leader	
Pals of the Saddle	1938		stunts	Henchman	Uncredited
Overland Stage Raiders	1938		stunts	Bus Driver	Uncredited
Storm Over Bengal	1938			Tribesman	Uncredited
Santa Fe Stampede	1938		stunts	Ben Carey	Uncredited
Captain Fury	1939		stunts		Uncredited
Desperate Trails	1939		stage driving double: Horace Murphy		Uncredited
Dodge City	1939		stunts		Uncredited
Man of Conquest	1939		stunts		Uncredited
New Frontier	1939		stunts		Uncredited
The Light That Failed	1939		stunts		Uncredited
The Lone Ranger Rides Again	1939		stunts		Uncredited
The Oregon Trail	1939		stunts		Uncredited, (archive footage)
Three Texas Steers	1939		stunts		Uncredited
Young Mr. Lincoln	1939		stunts		Uncredited
Stagecoach	1939	second unit director, uncredited	stunt coordinator	Cavalry scout	Uncredited
The Night Riders	1939			Mob Member	Uncredited
Daredevils of the Red Circle	1939			G-man	Serial, [Chs. 10, 12], Uncredited
Wyoming Outlaw	1939			Henchman Ed Sims	
Dust Be My Destiny	1939			Ambulance Man	Uncredited
The Kansas Terrors	1939		stunt double, uncredited	The Sergeant	
Cowboys from Texas	1939		stunts, uncredited	Tex Dawson	
Gone with the Wind	1939		stunt coordinator, uncredited; stunt double: Clark Gable, uncredited	Renegade	
Zorro's Fighting Legion	1939		stunts	Trooper	Uncredited
Boom Town	1940		stunts		Uncredited
Lone Star Raiders	1940		stunt coordinator		Uncredited
One Million B.C.	1940		stunts		Uncredited
The Border Legion	1940		stunt coordinator		Uncredited
The Trail Blazers	1940		stunt double		Uncredited
Three Faces West	1940		stunt coordinator		Uncredited
Virginia City	1940		stunt double: Errol Flynn / Guinn Williams		Uncredited
When the Daltons Rode	1940		stunts		Uncredited
Young Bill Hickok	1940		stunt double: stagestunt		Uncredited
Calling Philo Vance	1940			Sailor on the Sorrento	Uncredited
Pioneers of the West	1940			Henchman Nolan	
Ghost Valley Raiders	1940			Marty Owens, Stagedriver	
Dark Command	1940	second unit director, uncredited	stunt coordinator	Townsman on balcony	Uncredited
The Carson City Kid	1940			Pete - Bartender	Uncredited
Deadwood Dick	1940		stunt double: Don Douglas	Henchman	Serial, [ch. 5], Uncredited
The Ranger and the Lady	1940		stunt coordinator, uncredited	Mack	
Oklahoma Renegades	1940			Rancher	Uncredited
Under Texas Skies	1940			Henchman Talbot	
Frontier Vengeance	1940			Henchman Zack	
Mysterious Doctor Satan	1940			Sailor at Winch	Serial, [Chs. 3-4], Uncredited
Country Fair	1941		stunts		Uncredited
Gangs of Sonora	1941		stunts		Uncredited
Jungle Girl	1941		stunt coordinator		Serial, Uncredited
Pals of the Pecos	1941		stunts		Uncredited
They Died with Their Boots On	1941		stunt coordinator		Uncredited
Western Union	1941		stunts		
White Eagle	1941		stunts	Henchman	Serial, [Ch. 4], Uncredited
Prairie Pioneers	1941		stunt coordinator	Henchman Morrison	Uncredited
The Great Train Robbery	1941			Klefner	
Saddlemates	1941		stunts	Wagon driver	Uncredited
Nevada City	1941		stunts	second Stagecoach Driver	Uncredited
Kansas Cyclone	1941			Wagon Driver	Uncredited
Bad Man of Deadwood	1941		stunts	Stage Driver	Uncredited
Gauchos of El Dorado	1941			Henchman Snakes	
Code of the Outlaw	1942		stunt double: Tom Tyler		
Flying Tigers	1942		stunt coordinator		Uncredited
Gentleman Jim	1942		stunts		Uncredited
Heart of the Rio Grande	1942			Wranger	Uncredited
Spy Smasher	1942		stunts	Armored Car Driver	Serial, [Ch. 9], Uncredited
Remember Pearl Harbor	1942			Bar Brawler	Uncredited
Perils of Nyoka	1942			Tuareg	Uncredited
Shadows on the Sage	1942			Red Harvey, a Henchman	
Idaho	1943		stunts		Uncredited
King of the Cowboys	1943			Duke Wilson Henchman	Uncredited
Santa Fe Scouts	1943				Uncredited
Calling Wild Bill Elliott	1943			Militiaman	Uncredited
Riders of the Rio Grande	1943			Deputy	Uncredited
Coney Island	1943			Saloon Waiter in Brawl	Uncredited
Song of Texas	1943			Rodeo performer	Uncredited
Thundering Trails	1943		stunt coordinator		Uncredited
For Whom the Bell Tolls	1943			Young cavalryman	Uncredited
In Old Oklahoma	1943	second unit director, uncredited	stunts	Brawler	Uncredited
Call of the Rockies	1944	second unit director, uncredited			
Pride of the Plains	1944			Henchman Bowman	
Hidden Valley Outlaws	1944		stunt coordinator	Vigilante Tracy	Uncredited
San Fernando Valley	1944	second unit director			
The Fighting Seabees	1944	second unit director, uncredited	stunts		Uncredited
The San Antonio Kid	1944		stunt coordinator		Uncredited
Tucson Raiders	1944	second unit director			
Vigilantes of Dodge City	1944	second unit director			
Zorro's Black Whip	1944	second unit director			
Along the Navajo Trail	1945	second unit director	stunts		Uncredited
Dakota	1945	second unit director	stunt double		Uncredited
Federal Operator 99	1945	director			
The Man from Oklahoma	1945	second unit director, uncredited			
Manhunt of Mystery Island	1945	director			
Sheriff of Cimarron	1945	director			
Sunset in El Dorado	1945		stunt double: Roy Rogers		Uncredited
The Topeka Terror	1945	second unit director	stunts		Uncredited, (archive footage)
Desert Command	1946			El Shaitan masked	Uncredited
My Pal Trigger	1946	second unit director; uncredited director			
Santa Fe Uprising	1946	second unit director			
Sun Valley Cyclone	1946	second unit director			
Under Nevada Skies	1946	second unit director			
Angel and the Badman	1947	second unit director			
Northwest Outpost	1947	second unit director			
That's My Man	1947	second unit director			
Trail to San Antone	1947		stunts		Uncredited, (archive footage)
Twilight on the Rio Grande	1947	second unit director			
Wyoming	1947	second unit director			
Adventures of Frank and Jesse James	1948	director			
Carson City Raiders	1948	director			
Dangers of the Canadian Mounted	1948	director			
G-Men Never Forget	1948	director			
Moonrise	1948	second unit director			
Oklahoma Badlands	1948	director	stunts	Rancher	Uncredited
Sons of Adventure	1948	director			
The Untamed Breed	1948		stunt coordinator		Uncredited
Hellfire	1949	second unit director			
Red Stallion in the Rockies	1949	second unit director	stunt coordinator		
The Doolins of Oklahoma	1949	second unit director			
Devil's Doorway	1950	second unit director, uncredited			
Fast on the Draw	1950			Rodeo Scene Stock Footage	Uncredited
Stage to Tucson	1950	second unit director			
The Showdown	1950			Davis	
Rocky Mountain	1950		stunt coordinator	Trooper Ryan	Uncredited
Only the Valiant	1951		stunt coordinator		Uncredited
Soldiers Three	1951	second unit director, uncredited			
Spoilers of the Plains	1951		horse-wagon transfer stunt		Uncredited
Hangman's Knot	1952	second unit director			
Ivanhoe	1952	second unit director, uncredited			
Battle Circus	1953		stunts		Uncredited
Knights of the Round Table	1953	second unit director, uncredited			
Last of the Comanches	1953	second unit director			
King Richard and the Crusaders	1954	second unit director			
The Lawless Rider	1954	director			
Helen of Troy	1956	second unit director			
Westward Ho the Wagons!	1956	second unit director			
Zarak	1956	assistant director			
Old Yeller	1957	second unit director			
Ben-Hur	1959	second unit director			
Rio Bravo	1959		stunt coordinator	Gunman on horse	Uncredited
Zorro Rides Again	1959		stunts		Uncredited
Spartacus	1960	second unit director	stunt coordinator; stunts		Uncredited
Swiss Family Robinson	1960	second unit director			
El Cid	1961	second unit director			
The Fall of the Roman Empire	1964	second unit director			
Cat Ballou	1965	second unit director; executive in charge of production uncredited	stunt coordinator		Uncredited
Captain Mephisto and the Transformation Machine	1966	director			TV movie
Code 645	1966	director			
Khartoum	1966	second unit director			
R.C.M.P. and the Treasure of Genghis Khan	1966	director			TV movie
The Flim-Flam Man	1967	second unit director			
Blue	1968	second unit director; uncredited director	stunts		Uncredited
Where Eagles Dare	1968	second unit director			
A Man Called Horse	1970	second unit director			
Rio Lobo	1970	second unit director			
Song of Norway	1970	second unit director			
Breakheart Pass	1975	second unit director	stunt coordinator		
Equus	1977	technical advisor			
