= Circle of Death =

Circle of Death may refer to:

== Arts and entertainment ==
- Circle of Death, a 2008 album by Dance Club Massacre
- The Circle of Death, a 1922 German silent film directed by William Karfiol
- The Circle of Death, a 1935 American film directed by Yakima Canutt

== Sports and recreation ==
- Circle of death (boating), a hazardous phenomenon experienced by motorboats
- Circle of Death (cycling), the hardest Tour de France stage in the Pyrenees
- Circle of Death (drinking game) or Kings, a drinking game using playing cards
- Circle of Death (sports), a type of tie in sporting events

== See also ==
- Red Ring of Death, an indicator of some types of Xbox 360 technical problems
