= Humanity (film) =

1933 film

- Directed by: John Francis Dillon
- Screenplay by: Bradley King
- Starring: Ralph Morgan; Boots Mallory; Alexander Kirkland; Irene Ware; Noel Madison; Wade Boteler
- Cinematography: L. William O'Connell
- Edited by: Frank Hull
- Production company: Fox Film Corporation
- Distributed by: Fox Film Corporation
- Release date: March 3, 1933
- Running time: 70 minutes
- Country: United States
- Language: English

Humanity is a 1933 American Pre-Code drama film directed by John Francis Dillon and written by Bradley King. The film stars Ralph Morgan, Boots Mallory, Alexander Kirkland, Irene Ware, Noel Madison and Wade Boteler. The film was released on March 3, 1933, by Fox Film Corporation.

== Cast ==
- Ralph Morgan as Dr. William MacDonald
- Boots Mallory as Nancy Moore
- Alexander Kirkland as Bill MacDonald
- Irene Ware as Olive Pelton
- Noel Madison as Sam Bernstein
- Wade Boteler as Police Lt. Mike Farley
- Christian Rub as Schmiddy
- Betty Jane Graham as Rosie Schmidt
- Ferike Boros as Mrs. Bernstein
- George Irving as Dr. Van Buren
- Crauford Kent as James Pelton
- Nella Walker as Mrs. James Pelton
