= James Flavin =

American actor (1906–1976)

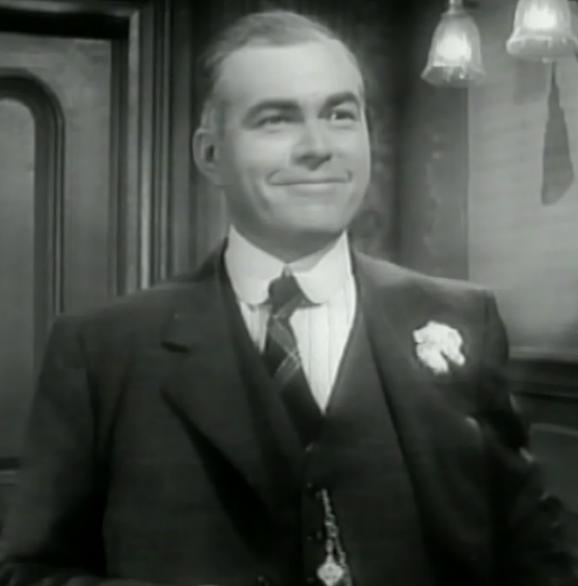
- Flavin in The Fabulous Dorseys (1947)
- Born: James William Flavin Jr. May 14, 1906; Portland, Maine, U.S.
- Died: April 23, 1976 (aged 69); Los Angeles, California, U.S.
- Resting place: Holy Cross Cemetery, Culver City, California, U.S.
- Occupation: Actor
- Years active: 1932–1976
- Spouse: Lucile Browne (m. 1932)
- Children: 1

James William Flavin Jr. (May 14, 1906 – April 23, 1976) was an American character actor whose stage, film, and television career lasted some forty years.

== Early life ==
Flavin was born in Portland, Maine, the son of a hotel waiter of Canadian-English origins and a mother, Katherine, whose father was an Irish immigrant. He graduated from Portland High School in 1923. He then enrolled at the United States Military Academy (West Point), where he played football, but did not graduate.

== Career ==
Summer stock companies flocked to Maine each year, and in 1929 Flavin was asked to fill in for an actor. He did well with the part and the company manager offered him $150 per week to accompany the troupe back to New York. Flavin accepted and by the spring of 1930, he resided in a rooming house at 108 W. 87th Street in Manhattan.

Flavin worked his way across the country in stock productions and tours, arriving in Los Angeles around 1932. He quickly made the transition to movies, landing the lead role in his very first film, a Universal serial, The Airmail Mystery (1932). He married his costar in that film, Lucile Browne, that same year. The serial marked virtually the last time that Flavin would play the lead in a film. Thereafter, he was restricted almost exclusively to supporting characters, many of whom were unnamed. He specialized in uniformed cops and hard-bitten detectives, but also played chauffeurs, cabbies, and even a 16th-century palace guard.

Flavin appeared in nearly four hundred films between 1932 and 1971. He appeared in almost one hundred television episodes, including the NBC sitcom, The People's Choice, starring Jackie Cooper, several episodes as police Detective Sawyer, who was being driven nuts by Gracie Allen on The Burns and Allen Show, and three times as a sheriff on the western aviation adventure series, Sky King, before his final appearance, as U.S. President Dwight D. Eisenhower, in Francis Gary Powers: The True Story of the U-2 Spy Incident (1976), a dramatization of the shooting down in 1960 by the former Soviet Union of the U-2 pilot, Francis Gary Powers.

Flavin portrayed Sam Cooper in the 1958 episode, "The Ed Church Case", of the CBS crime drama series, Richard Diamond, Private Detective, starring David Janssen. In 1959, he guest starred as Big Dan Girod in the episode, "Invitation to a Murder", on the ABC/WB detective series, Bourbon Street Beat, starring Andrew Duggan. In 1960, Flavin appeared in The Twilight Zone episode "A Passage for Trumpet".

From 1960 to 1962, Flavin was cast as Robert Howard in 33 episodes of the ABC/Warner Brothers drama series, The Roaring 20s, starring with Dorothy Provine, Donald May, Rex Reason, John Dehner, Gary Vinson, and Mike Road.

From 1960 to 1962, Flavin appeared three times on the CBS sitcom, Pete and Gladys, with Harry Morgan and Cara Williams. He also had a recurring role on CBS' talking-horse sitcom Mister Ed as Mr. Kramer, the stable owner. Flavin portrayed Fire Chief Hawkins in the 1964 episode, "Beyond a Reasonable Doubt", on the NBC education drama series, Mr. Novak, starring James Franciscus.

Flavin made his Broadway debut in the 1969 revival of The Front Page, in which he played Murphy and briefly took over the lead role of Walter Burns from Robert Ryan.

== Death ==
Flavin died at Cedars-Sinai Medical Center in Los Angeles, California, on April 23, 1976, after suffering a heart attack. His widow, Lucile Browne Flavin, died 17 days later. The couple is interred at Holy Cross Cemetery in Culver City, California.

== Selected filmography ==
- The Airmail Mystery (1932) as Bob Lee
- McKenna of the Mounted (1932) as Corporal Randall McKenna
- Back Street (1932) as Reporter (uncredited)
- Okay, America! (1932) as Minor Role (uncredited)
- The Most Dangerous Game (1932) as First Mate on Yacht (uncredited)
- The All American (1932) as Don Lindsay
- Air Mail (1932) as Man with Radio Report (uncredited)
- Hot Pepper (1933) as Second Policeman (uncredited)
- King Kong (1933) as Second Mate Briggs
- Hello, Sister! (1933) as Fireman
- Riot Squad (1933) as Detective Mack McCue
- Ship of Wanted Men (1933) as Frank Busch
- Only Yesterday (1933) as Billy (uncredited)
- Beloved (1934) as Wilcox
- The Big Race (1934) as Bill Figg
- The Crosby Case (1934) as Detective O'Shea (uncredited)
- Affairs of a Gentleman (1934) as Donovan (uncredited)
- Wild Gold (1934) as Detective (uncredited)
- Now I'll Tell (1934) as Cop on Beach (uncredited)
- Baby Take a Bow (1934) as Flannigan
- The Affairs of Cellini (1934) as Palace Guard (uncredited)
- Gift of Gab (1934) as Alumni President (uncredited)
- Wake Up and Dream (1934) as Cop (uncredited)
- The Brand of Hate (1934) as Holt Larkins
- Bright Eyes (1934) as Bob, Pilot (uncredited)
- Society Doctor (1935) as Detective Ewing (uncredited)
- After Office Hours (1935) as Police Detective (uncredited)
- Secrets of Chinatown (1935) as Brandhma
- Death Flies East (1935) as Co-Pilot (uncredited)
- Captain Hurricane (1935) as Freighter Officer (uncredited)
- Straight from the Heart (1935) as Policeman (uncredited)
- G Men (1935) as Agent with Jean (uncredited)
- Public Hero No. 1 (1935) as Flavin, Federal Agent (uncredited)
- People Will Talk (1935) as First Reporter (uncredited)
- Chinatown Squad (1935) as Detective (uncredited)
- Silk Hat Kid (1935) as Gangster (uncredited)
- The Murder Man (1935) as Policeman at Merry-Go-Round (uncredited)
- The Daring Young Man (1935) as Informant on Telephone (uncredited)
- Woman Wanted (1935) as Mac, Policeman (uncredited)
- Man on the Flying Trapeze (1935) as Henry, Chauffeur (uncredited)
- Special Agent (1935) as Agent Arresting Julie (uncredited)
- Shipmates Forever (1935) as Instructing Officer (uncredited)
- Rendezvous (1935) as 2nd Military Policeman (uncredited)
- Remember Last Night? (1935) as Policeman (uncredited)
- One Way Ticket (1935) as Ed
- The Littlest Rebel (1935) as Yankee Guard (uncredited)
- Magnificent Obsession (1935) as Chauffeur (uncredited)
- Song and Dance Man (1936) as Taxi Driver (uncredited)
- Charlie Chan at the Race Track (1936) as Detective at Headquarters (uncredited)
- Straight from the Shoulder (1936) as Policeman (uncredited)
- My Man Godfrey (1936) as Detective #2 (uncredited)
- They Met in a Taxi (1936) as Policeman (uncredited)
- The Luckiest Girl in the World (1936) as Policeman
- Two in a Crowd (1936) as Policeman (uncredited)
- The Magnificent Brute (1936) as Hunkie Partner (uncredited)
- Born to Dance (1936) as Ship's Officer (uncredited)
- Mysterious Crossing (1936) as Plainclothesman (uncredited)
- Dangerous Number (1937) as Cab Driver (uncredited)
- You Only Live Once (1937) as State Trooper (uncredited)
- Let's Get Married (1937) as Dolan (uncredited)
- Midnight Taxi (1937) as Detective McCormick (uncredited)
- Motor Madness (1937) as Miller (uncredited)
- I Promise to Pay (1937) as Bill Seaver
- That I May Live (1937) as Policeman (uncredited)
- San Quentin (1937) as Guard Announcing Jailbreak (uncredited)
- The League of Frightened Men (1937) as Joe
- This Is My Affair (1937) as Prison Guard (uncredited)
- Angel's Holiday (1937) as Detective (uncredited)
- Married Before Breakfast (1937) as Police Passenger (uncredited)
- Girls Can Play (1937) as Bill O'Malley
- Fit for a King (1937) as Ship's Officer (uncredited)
- Big City (1937) as Comet Cab Driver (uncredited)
- My Dear Miss Aldrich (1937) as Dr. Spitzy Calahan (uncredited)
- Charlie Chan on Broadway (1937) as Detective (uncredited)
- Dangerously Yours (1937) as Driver (uncredited)
- Hot Water (1937) as Policeman (uncredited)
- Live, Love and Learn (1937) as Marine Who Likes Painting (uncredited)
- Thoroughbreds Don't Cry (1937) as Timmie's Agent (uncredited)
- 45 Fathers (1937) as Policeman (uncredited)
- Big Town Girl (1937) as State Trooper (uncredited)
- Mannequin (1937) as Burly Man (uncredited)
- The Bad Man of Brimstone (1937) as Second Federal Marshal (uncredited)
- The Buccaneer (1938) as British Sergeant (uncredited)
- Everybody's Doing It (1938) as Detective Hayes (uncredited)
- Penitentiary (1938) as Doran (uncredited)
- Born to Be Wild (1938) as Striker (uncredited)
- Night Spot (1938) as Kidnapper (uncredited)
- Start Cheering (1938) as Gas Station Attendant (uncredited)
- Test Pilot (1938) as Pilot (uncredited)
- Alexander's Ragtime Band (1938) as Army Captain (uncredited)
- Wives Under Suspicion (1938) as Jenks, Chauffeur (uncredited)
- Speed to Burn (1938) as Radio Car Policeman (uncredited)
- The Shopworn Angel (1938) as Guard Yelling 'Halt!' (uncredited)
- Gateway (1938) as Guard (uncredited)
- I Am the Law (1938) as George, Witness (uncredited)
- You Can't Take It with You (1938) as Jailer (uncredited)
- Three Loves Has Nancy (1938) as Jack's Friend (uncredited)
- Too Hot to Handle (1938) as Young Reporter (uncredited)
- Time Out for Murder (1938) as Police Sergeant at Roundup (uncredited)
- Lightning Carson Rides Again (1938) as Justice Department Agent
- The Arkansas Traveler (1938) as Trainman (uncredited)
- Five of a Kind (1938) as Policeman (uncredited)
- Blondie (1938) as Policeman in Accident Car (uncredited)
- Ride a Crooked Mile (1938) as Hack (uncredited)
- Convicts at Large (1938) as Detective Sergeant Berkovich
- While New York Sleeps (1938) as 2nd Cop (uncredited)
- The Duke of West Point (1938) as Plebe Hockey Coach #1
- Swing, Sister, Swing (1938) as Pilot (scenes deleted)
- Sweethearts (1938) as Melody Theater Doorman (uncredited)
- Thanks for Everything (1938) as Policeman
- Charlie Chan in Honolulu (1938) as Homicide Division Desk Sergeant (uncredited)
- Jesse James (1939) as Cavalry Captain (uncredited)
- Pardon Our Nerve (1939) as Policeman (uncredited)
- The Ice Follies of 1939 (1939) as Doorman (uncredited)
- Sergeant Madden (1939) as Police Interrogator (uncredited)
- Everybody's Baby (1939) as Police Announcer (uncredited)
- Code of the Streets (1939) as Doorman
- The Lady's from Kentucky (1939) as Policeman (uncredited)
- Union Pacific (1939) as Paddy (uncredited)
- Big Town Czar (1939) as George Mitchell (uncredited)
- Rose of Washington Square (1939) as Guard (uncredited)
- Tell No Tales (1939) as Officer Simmons (uncredited)
- They Asked for It (1939) as Cop (uncredited)
- Unmarried (1939) as Oil Driller (uncredited)
- The Gracie Allen Murder Case (1939) as Turnkey (uncredited)
- 6,000 Enemies (1939) as Ring Announcer (uncredited)
- Mickey the Kid (1939) as Sanders
- They All Come Out (1939) as Officer (uncredited)
- Each Dawn I Die (1939) as Policeman (uncredited)
- They Shall Have Music (1939) as Police Sergeant (uncredited)
- Mr. Wong in Chinatown (1939) as Sergeant Jerry
- When Tomorrow Comes (1939) as Coast Guard Man on Road (uncredited)
- Irish Luck (1939) as Hotel Detective Fluger
- Calling All Marines (1939) as Sergeant Smith
- Fast and Furious (1939) as Policeman Guarding Entrance (uncredited)
- The Roaring Twenties (1939) as Policeman (uncredited)
- Joe and Ethel Turp Call on the President (1939) as Policeman (uncredited)
- The Cisco Kid and the Lady (1939) as Sergeant O'Riley
- Remember the Night (1940) as Court Attendant (uncredited)
- The Grapes of Wrath (1940) as Guard (uncredited)
- The Fighting 69th (1940) as Supply Sergeant (uncredited)
- Broadway Melody of 1940 (1940) as Bouncer (uncredited)
- Castle on the Hudson (1940) as Death Row Guard (uncredited)
- Framed (1940) as Cop (uncredited)
- Double Alibi (1940) as Patrolman Johnson (uncredited)
- Women Without Names (1940) as Guard (uncredited)
- Johnny Apollo (1940) as Guard in Library (uncredited)
- And One Was Beautiful (1940) as McRafferty, Jail Guard (uncredited)
- It All Came True (1940) as Roaring 90's Club Doorman (uncredited)
- Those Were the Days! (1940) as Policeman (uncredited)
- Hot Steel (1940) as Storm Swenson
- Girl in 313 (1940) as Detective Carvin
- La Conga Nights (1940) as Grogan (uncredited)
- The Way of All Flesh (1940) as Policeman (uncredited)
- Florian (1940) as Policeman (uncredited)
- The Ghost Breakers (1940) as Hotel Porter (uncredited)
- Brother Orchid (1940) as Parking Attendant at Fat Dutchy's (uncredited)
- Lucky Cisco Kid (1940) as Ranch Foreman (uncredited)
- The Man Who Talked Too Much (1940) as Pete, Prison Guard (uncredited)
- Queen of the Mob (1940) as Third FBI Director
- Sailor's Lady (1940) as Motorcycle Cop (uncredited)
- Private Affairs (1940) as Doorman (uncredited)
- Manhattan Heartbeat (1940) as Truck Driver
- South of Pago Pago (1940) as Cafe Customer
- When the Daltons Rode (1940) as Annabella's Brother (uncredited)
- The Golden Fleecing (1940) as Cop (uncredited)
- Rhythm on the River (1940) as Detective (uncredited)
- The Great Profile (1940) as Detective
- Yesterday's Heroes (1940) as Scout (uncredited)
- Knute Rockne All American (1940) as Army Assistant Coach (uncredited)
- The Long Voyage Home (1940) as Dock Policeman (uncredited)
- North West Mounted Police (1940) as Mountie (uncredited)
- The Devil's Pipeline (1940) as Dowling
- Dancing on a Dime (1940) as Policeman (uncredited)
- Youth Will Be Served (1940) as Buck Miller
- Street of Memories (1940) as Dance Hall Manager (uncredited)
- Give Us Wings (1940) as Mr. White (uncredited)
- Tin Pan Alley (1940) as Army Sergeant (uncredited)
- Four Mothers (1941) as Demolition Man (uncredited)
- High Sierra (1941) as Policeman (uncredited)
- Tall, Dark and Handsome (1941) as Detective in Cigar Store (uncredited)
- The Wild Man of Borneo (1940) as Policeman (uncredited)
- Mr. & Mrs. Smith (1941) as Attractive Woman's Escort (uncredited)
- Buck Privates (1941) as Recruiting Sergeant (uncredited)
- Western Union (1941) as Deputy Sheriff (uncredited)
- The Strawberry Blonde (1941) as Ticket Inspector on Boat (uncredited)
- Footsteps in the Dark (1941) as Police Broadcaster (uncredited)
- Pot o' Gold (1941) as Sheriff Bud Connolly (uncredited)
- Ride on Vaquero (1941) as Officer Johnson (uncredited)
- Ziegfeld Girl (1941) as Buck, Truck Driver (uncredited)
- The People vs. Dr. Kildare (1941) as Bob Hackley (uncredited)
- Reaching for the Sun (1941) as First Guard (uncredited)
- Affectionately Yours (1941) as Tomassetti
- Adventure in Washington (1941) as Matty (uncredited)
- Sunny (1941) as Motorcycle Cop (uncredited)
- The Bride Came C.O.D. (1941) as Interrogating Detective (uncredited)
- Manpower (1941) as Orderly About to Give Bath (uncredited)
- Life Begins for Andy Hardy (1941) as Policeman (uncredited)
- Belle Starr (1941) as Sergeant
- Hold Back the Dawn (1941) as Immigration Guard (uncredited)
- We Go Fast (1941) as Police Lieutenant Bardette
- Texas (1941) as Abilene Fight Announcer (uncredited)
- Great Guns (1941) as Army Captain at White Army Tent (uncredited)
- I Wake Up Screaming (1941) as Detective (uncredited)
- New York Town (1941) as Recruiting Sergeant (uncredited)
- Skylark (1941) as Subway Guard (uncredited)
- Shadow of the Thin Man (1941) as Cop Who Greets Nick at Racetrack (uncredited)
- The Night of January 16th (1941) as Patrolman Kelly
- Kathleen (1941) as Moving Man
- Bedtime Story (1941) as Hotel Guest in Room 625 (uncredited)
- You're in the Army Now (1941) as Officer (uncredited)
- Treat 'Em Rough (1942) as Joe Trosper
- Mr. and Mrs. North (1942) as Police Captain (uncredited)
- A Yank on the Burma Road (1942) as Police Radio Dispatcher (uncredited)
- Ride 'Em Cowboy (1942) as Railroad Detective #2 (uncredited)
- Born to Sing (1942) as Cop (uncredited)
- Reap the Wild Wind (1942) as Girl's Father (uncredited)
- Broadway (1942) as Doorman (uncredited)
- To the Shores of Tripoli (1942) as Warden (uncredited)
- Juke Box Jenny (1942) as First Customs Officer
- Kid Glove Killer (1942) as Keenan, Detective Grilling Eddie (uncredited)
- Saboteur (1942) as Motorcycle Cop (voice, uncredited)
- Fingers at the Window (1942) as Lieutenant Schaeffer
- Larceny, Inc. (1942) as Bank Guard (uncredited)
- Yankee Doodle Dandy (1942) as Union Army Veteran #1 on Caisson (uncredited)
- Juke Girl (1942) as Atlanta Policeman (uncredited)
- Ten Gentlemen from West Point (1942) as Captain Luddy
- Tough As They Come (1942) as Process Server (uncredited)
- The Big Shot (1942) as Detective (uncredited)
- Thru Different Eyes (1942) as Thomas
- Night in New Orleans (1942) as Egan (uncredited)
- Iceland (1942) as Sergeant (uncredited)
- Gentleman Jim (1942) as George Corbett (uncredited)
- Life Begins at Eight-Thirty (1942) as Policeman (uncredited)
- City Without Men (1943) as Coast Guard Officer (uncredited)
- Air Force (1943) as Major A.M. Bagley
- Something to Shout About (1943) as Policeman (uncredited)
- It Ain't Hay (1943) as Cop (uncredited)
- Hello, Frisco, Hello (1943) as Headwaiter (uncredited)
- Mission to Moscow (1943) as American Senator (uncredited)
- Action in the North Atlantic (1943) as Merchant Marine School Lieutenant-Commander (uncredited)
- Heaven Can Wait (1943) as Policeman (uncredited)
- Swing Shift Maisie (1943) as Radio Policeman (uncredited)
- So Proudly We Hail! (1943) as Captain O'Brien (uncredited)
- Murder on the Waterfront (1943) as Commander George Kalin
- Thank Your Lucky Stars (1943) as Policeman (uncredited)
- Corvette K-225 (1943) as 1st Lieutenant Bill Gardner
- I Dood It (1943) as Federal Agent (uncredited)
- Footlight Glamour (1943) as Mr. Phillips (uncredited)
- The Iron Major (1943) as Football Umpire (uncredited)
- Riding High (1943) as Train Conductor (uncredited)
- There's Something About a Soldier (1943) as Civilian Brawler (uncredited)
- Ladies Courageous (1944) as Gardner (uncredited)
- Four Jills in a Jeep (1944) as Military Police Sergeant (uncredited)
- Uncertain Glory (1944) as Captain of Mobile Guard
- Bermuda Mystery (1944) as Dempsey (uncredited)
- Once Upon a Time (1944) as Skeptic on Subway (uncredited)
- Christmas Holiday (1944) as Policeman (uncredited)
- Mr. Winkle Goes to War (1944) as Sergeant (uncredited)
- Abroad with Two Yanks (1944) as Sergeant Wiggins
- Strange Affair (1944) as Bank Security Guard (uncredited)
- Laura (1944) as Detective McEveety (uncredited)
- The Princess and the Pirate (1944) as Naval Officer (uncredited)
- Hollywood Canteen (1944) as Marine Sergeant (uncredited)
- Here Come the Waves (1944) as Shore Patrolman (uncredited)
- Together Again (1944) as Policeman (uncredited)
- God Is My Co-Pilot (1945) as Major at Kweilin Airbase (uncredited)
- Without Love (1945) as Sergeant (uncredited)
- Circumstantial Evidence (1945) as Guard (uncredited)
- Pillow to Post (1945) as Louie, Army Sergeant in Jeep (uncredited)
- Don Juan Quilligan (1945) as Police Sergeant (uncredited)
- Wonder Man (1945) as Bus Driver (uncredited)
- Conflict (1945) as Detective Lieutenant Workman (uncredited)
- Murder, He Says (1945) as Police Officer (uncredited)
- Within These Walls (1945) as Guard (uncredited)
- Anchors Aweigh (1945) as Radio Cop
- Over 21 (1945) as Captain (uncredited)
- Incendiary Blonde (1945) as Mounted Policeman (uncredited)
- The Shanghai Cobra (1945) as H.R. Jarvis
- Duffy's Tavern (1945) as Cop (uncredited)
- Mildred Pierce (1945) as Detective (uncredited)
- Johnny Angel (1945) as Flavin, Mate of the Quincy (uncredited)
- Hold That Blonde (1945) as Laundry Truck Driver (uncredited)
- Masquerade in Mexico (1945) as FBI Agent (uncredited)
- San Antonio (1945) as Streeter, Cattleman (uncredited)
- The Spider (1945) as Officer Johnny Tracy
- Tars and Spars (1946) as Chief Bosun Mate Gurney (uncredited)
- Young Widow (1946) as Subway Conductor (uncredited)
- Sentimental Journey (1946) as Detective Sergeant McFarland (uncredited)
- The Hoodlum Saint (1946) as Man Assigning Numbers at Dance Contest (uncredited)
- A Stolen Life (1946) as Investigator (uncredited)
- Her Kind of Man (1946) as Evans (uncredited)
- The Strange Love of Martha Ivers (1946) as Detective #1
- Easy to Wed (1946) as Joe
- Boys' Ranch (1946) as Baseball Stadium Policeman (uncredited)
- Rendezvous with Annie (1946) as Turnkey
- Courage of Lassie (1946) as Lieutenant Tom Arnold (uncredited)
- It Shouldn't Happen to a Dog (1946) as Police Lieutenant (uncredited)
- The Missing Lady (1946) as Police Inspector Cardona
- Step by Step (1946) as Woods (uncredited)
- Cloak and Dagger (1946) as Colonel Walsh
- Angel on My Shoulder (1946) as Bellamy
- Two Years Before the Mast (1946) as Crimp (uncredited)
- Nobody Lives Forever (1946) as Shake Thomas
- The Mighty McGurk (1947) as Police Officer (uncredited)
- Ladies' Man (1947) as Automat Manager (uncredited)
- Easy Come, Easy Go (1947) as Plainclothes Man (uncredited)
- Nora Prentiss (1947) as District Attorney
- The Fabulous Dorseys (1947) as Gorman
- My Favorite Brunette (1947) as Detective Lieutenant 'Mac' Hennessey (uncredited)
- Lost Honeymoon (1947) as Officer Max Riley (uncredited)
- It Happened on Fifth Avenue (1947) as First Policeman (uncredited)
- Dishonored Lady (1947) as Police Sergeant Patella (uncredited)
- Robin Hood of Texas (1947) as Police Captain Danforth
- Desert Fury (1947) as Sheriff Pat Johnson
- Song of the Thin Man (1947) as Reardon, Police Officer (uncredited)
- Black Gold (1947) as Mac, Race Clerk (uncredited)
- Joe Palooka in the Knockout (1947) as Policeman
- Unconquered (1947) as Villager (uncredited)
- Nightmare Alley (1947) as Hoatley - First Carnival Owner (uncredited)
- Sleep, My Love (1948) as Police Lieutenant Mitchell (uncredited)
- My Girl Tisa (1948) as Guard (uncredited)
- The Noose Hangs High (1948) as Traffic Cop (uncredited)
- Fury at Furnace Creek (1948) as Judge Advocate (uncredited)
- Secret Service Investigator (1948) as Police Inspector Thorndyke
- The Velvet Touch (1948) as Sergeant Oliphant
- The Babe Ruth Story (1948) as First Mate at Ruth's Bar (uncredited)
- One Touch of Venus (1948) as Kerrigan
- The Return of October (1948) as Detention Ward Guard (uncredited)
- The Plunderers (1948) as Sergeant Major
- Bungalow 13 (1948) as Lieutenant Sam Wilson
- Shockproof (1949) as Policeman in Park (uncredited)
- Homicide (1949) as Detective Lieutenant Boylan
- My Dream Is Yours (1949) as Coconut Grove Waiter (uncredited)
- Flamingo Road (1949) as Angry Carnival Creditor (uncredited)
- Mississippi Rhythm (1949) as Stan Caldwell
- Mighty Joe Young (1949) as Schultz
- Abbott and Costello Meet the Killer, Boris Karloff (1949) as Inspector Wellman
- Blondie Hits the Jackpot (1949) as Brophy
- The Devil's Henchman (1949) as Police Sergeant Briggs
- Prison Warden (1949) as Guard Captain Peter Butler
- Key to the City (1950) as S.F. Cop, Costume Party Arrest (uncredited)
- When Willie Comes Marching Home (1950) as General Brevort (uncredited)
- Dakota Lil (1950) as Secret Service Chief
- Rock Island Trail (1950) as Railroad Workman (uncredited)
- The Savage Horde (1950) as Guard
- Armored Car Robbery (1950) as Police Lieutenant Phillips
- Destination Murder (1950) as Police Lieutenant Brewster
- My Friend Irma Goes West (1950) as Sheriff (uncredited)
- South Sea Sinner (1950) as Andrews
- Operation Pacific (1951) as Mick, SP Commander (uncredited)
- Oh! Susanna (1951) as Captain Worth
- Up Front (1951) as Minor Role
- Follow the Sun (1951) as Henry Gibbs (uncredited)
- Fighting Coast Guard (1951) as Commander Rogers
- According to Mrs. Hoyle (1951) as Prosecuting Attorney
- Rhubarb (1951) as O'Leary, Manhattan Police Chief (uncredited)
- Come Fill the Cup (1951) as Russ, Homicide Captain (uncredited)
- Sailor Beware (1952) as Petty Officer (uncredited)
- The Fighter (1952) as Cop (uncredited)
- Jumping Jacks (1952) as General Sterling (uncredited)
- Here Come the Marines (1952) as Colonel Evans
- Carrie (1952) as Mike, Bartender (uncredited)
- O. Henry's Full House (1952) as Cop (segment "The Cop and the Anthem") (uncredited)
- My Pal Gus (1952) as Bailiff (uncredited)
- Million Dollar Mermaid (1952) as Conductor
- Star of Texas (1953) as Texas Rangers Captain Sturdivant
- Confidentially Connie (1953) as Harry, Club Chairman (uncredited)
- Trouble Along the Way (1953) as Coach Buck Holman (uncredited)
- Abbott and Costello Go to Mars (1953) as First Policeman in Bank
- Francis Covers the Big Town (1953) as Detective Mulvaney (uncredited)
- Hot News (1953) as Al Bragg
- Fighter Attack (1953) as Colonel Allison
- The Eddie Cantor Story (1953) as Kelly, Policeman (uncredited)
- Ma and Pa Kettle at Home (1954) as Motorcycle Cop (uncredited)
- I Beheld His Glory (1954) as Doctor (uncredited)
- Untamed Heiress (1954) as Policeman (uncredited)
- Massacre Canyon (1954) as Colonel Tarant (uncredited)
- Mister Roberts (1955) as Military Policeman
- Apache Ambush (1955) as Colonel Marshall
- The Naked Street (1955) as Attorney Michael X. Flanders
- Never Say Goodbye (1956) as Timmy
- Francis in the Haunted House (1956) as Police Chief Martin
- Top Secret Affair (1957) as American Legionnaire (uncredited)
- The Wings of Eagles (1957) as Military Policeman at Garden Party (uncredited)
- Hold That Hypnotist (1957) as Jake Morgan
- Footsteps in the Night (1957) as Mr. Bradbury
- The Restless Breed (1957) as Secret Service Chief
- Beau James (1957) as Captain Dennis (uncredited)
- Night Passage (1957) as Tim Riley
- Wild Is the Wind (1957) as Wool Buyer
- Up in Smoke (1957) as Policeman
- Alfred Hitchcock Presents (1958) (Season 4 Episode 8: "Safety for the Witness") as Joe Felix
- The Last Hurrah (1958) as Police Capt. Michael J. Shanahan (uncredited)
- Johnny Rocco (1958) as Mooney
- Alfred Hitchcock Presents (1959) (Season 4 Episode 35: "Touché") as Dan
- The Rifleman(1960) (Season 2, Episode 27: "Lariat") as Morody
- Alfred Hitchcock Presents (1962) (Season 7 Episode 36: "First Class Honeymoon") as Tony the Doorman
- The Alfred Hitchcock Hour (1962) (Season 1 Episode 10: "Day of Reckoning") as Coroner
- Critic's Choice (1963) as Security Guard (uncredited)
- It's a Mad, Mad, Mad, Mad World (1963) as Patrolman (uncredited)
- Cheyenne Autumn (1964) as Ft. Robinson Sergeant of the Guard (uncredited)
- The Adventures of Bullwhip Griffin (1967) as Ship Ticket Agent (uncredited)
- Good Times (1967) as Lieutenant
- In Cold Blood (1967) as Clarence Duntz
- The Barefoot Executive (1971) as Father O'Leary
