= Texas Terror =

Texas Terror may refer to:

- Texas Terror (film), a 1935 western film starring John Wayne
- Texas Terror, a franchise in the Arena Football League in the late 1990s, later Houston ThunderBears
