= On Probation (1935 film) =

1935 film directed by Charles Hutchison

- Directed by: Charles Hutchison
- Written by: Sherman L. Lowe; Crane Wilbur
- Produced by: Sam Efrus
- Starring: Monte Blue; Lucile Browne; William Bakewell
- Cinematography: J. Henry Kruse
- Edited by: Fred Bain
- Music by: Cecil Stewart
- Production company: Peerless Pictures
- Distributed by: Hollywood Film Exchange
- Release date: April 1, 1935
- Running time: 71 minutes
- Country: United States
- Language: English

On Probation is a 1935 American drama film directed by Charles Hutchison and starring Monte Blue, Lucile Browne and William Bakewell.

== Cast ==
- Monte Blue as Al Murray
- Lucile Browne as Jane Murray
- William Bakewell as Bill Coleman
- Barbara Bedford as Mable Gordon
- Matthew Betz as Dan
- Edward LeSaint as Judge
- Betty Jane Graham as Jane at Age 12
- Arthur Loft as Benson
- Henry Roquemore as Lambert
- Lloyd Ingraham as Horne
- King Kennedy as Clarence
- Margaret Fealy as Fagan Woman

== Bibliography ==
- Pitts, Michael R. Poverty Row Studios, 1929–1940: An Illustrated History of 55 Independent Film Companies, with a Filmography for Each. McFarland & Company, 2005.
