= Rainbow Valley (film) =

1935 film

- Film poster
- Directed by: Robert N. Bradbury
- Written by: Lindsley Parsons
- Produced by: Paul Malvern
- Starring: John Wayne; George "Gabby" Hayes
- Cinematography: William Hyer; Archie Stout
- Edited by: Carl Pierson
- Distributed by: Monogram Pictures
- Release date: March 15, 1935
- Running time: 52 minutes
- Country: United States
- Language: English

Rainbow Valley is a 1935 American Western film released by Monogram Pictures, written by Lindsley Parsons, directed by Robert N. Bradbury and starring John Wayne and George Hayes.

== Plot ==
Riding to the small town of Rainbow Valley, John Martin meets George, the mailman for the area, who is looking for water for his car. Martin, surprised to see a car, gives George his canteen of water. Farther down the road, highwaymen have set up an ambush for George. Martin, who is following on horseback, drives off the highwaymen.

Martin takes George to the town doctor. Eleanor, the postmistress, is suspicious of Martin, but George explains how he fought off the gang. The townspeople are tired of being terrorized by the highwaymen. They are circulating a petition to the governor for assistance in completing their road and ridding it of the gang, which is led by Rogers, a wealthy landowner whose goal is to drive out the townspeople and buy their land cheaply.

Martin went to school for engineering, and volunteers to take charge of the road work. With Martin's encouragement, the road workers start defending themselves against gang attacks. A shoot-out occurs, and George uses dynamite to fend off the attackers.

Rogers walks into the Post Office and steals the road petition, substituting another petition to release a gang member, Butch, from jail. The gang also steals all the remaining dynamite.

Two weeks later, Martin and George wonder why they have not heard any response to the petition. At the gang hideout, the pardoned Butch wants to see Martin, who was his cellmate in jail. Martin seems happy to hear that Butch is in town, and meets with him. He agrees to destroy the road in return for a cut of the profits when the townspeople sell out.

The townspeople gather and talk about how Martin has betrayed them. Powell issues a call to arms. George and Eleanor find a letter from the governor. Martin is actually an undercover agent who is trying to bust the gang.

The mob approaches the gang and Martin. A shoot-out begins between the townspeople and the gang. Butch sets off the dynamite, killing Rogers and all of his men. Martin arrests Butch and explains his undercover assignment to the townspeople.

George drives his car up to the hill and remarks on the road's success. In the back seat of the car, Martin and Eleanor are kissing.

== Cast ==
- John Wayne as John Martin
- Lucile Browne as Eleanor
- George "Gabby" Hayes as George Hale
- LeRoy Mason as Rogers
- Lloyd Ingraham as Warden Powell
- Jay Wilsey as Butch Galt
- Frank Ball as Powell
- Bert Dillard as Henchman Spike
- Lafe McKee as Storekeeper
- Eddie Parker as Prison Guard
