= Hello, Sister! (1933 film) =

1933 American film

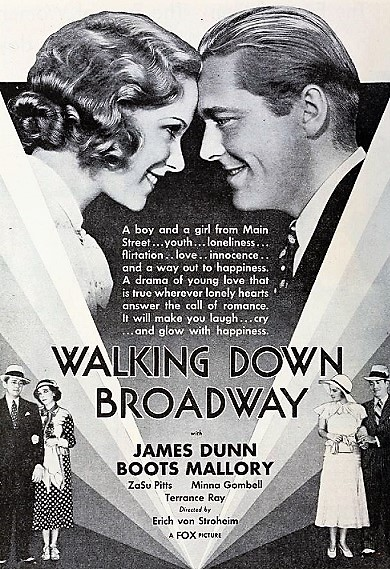
- Original film poster
- Directed by: No director credit given Erich von Stroheim; Raoul Walsh; Alfred L. Werker; Edwin Burke
- Written by: Dawn Powell (play Walking Down Broadway); Erich von Stroheim; Leonard Spigelgass; Maurine Dallas Watkins; Edwin Burke
- Produced by: Winfield R. Sheehan; Sol M. Wurtzel
- Starring: James Dunn; ZaSu Pitts; Minna Gombell; Boots Mallory
- Cinematography: James Wong Howe
- Edited by: Frank E. Hull
- Music by: Arthur Lange
- Distributed by: Fox Film Corporation
- Release date: April 14, 1933
- Running time: 60 minutes
- Country: United States
- Language: English

Hello, Sister! is a 1933 American pre-Code drama-romance film produced by Fox Film Corporation. It was directed by Erich von Stroheim, Raoul Walsh, Alfred L. Werker, and Edwin Burke, although none of those directors are credited. The film is a re-edited version of von Stroheim's now-lost film Walking Down Broadway.

The film stars James Dunn, ZaSu Pitts, Minna Gombell, and Boots Mallory. The story follows the relationship between an innocent, small-town boy and girl who are overmatched by the vastness and crudeness of New York City, but whose love overcomes both their surroundings and their friends' attempts to separate them. The theme of loneliness among singles and the practice of "picking up" strangers to satisfy sexual longing are also explored. Hello, Sister! was also thought to have been lost, until a print was found in the early 1970s.

== Title ==
According to the Motion Picture Herald, "Hello, Sister!" is "the salutation of the 'pick-up.'"

== Plot ==
Mona encourages her two friends Millie and Peggy, both newcomers to the city, to accompany her "walking down Broadway" to meet men. They encounter two young men on the street and pair off, though not with the ones they prefer. Millie, a homely, eccentric woman who likes to talk about death, immediately casts her eye on Jimmy, a shy Midwesterner, but Jimmy prefers Peggy, a sweet, innocent girl from the South. But Mac, an abrasive New Yorker, takes Peggy for his partner and Jimmy is forced to be with Millie as the group heads off to Coney Island. At the amusements, Mac proves himself to be a boor and Peggy wants to go home, but Millie convinces her to go dancing with them. On the way home, they see a dog hit by a car and Jimmy picks up the injured animal; Peggy offers to help treat it at her apartment. Millie slips and falls into a sewer and is rescued by Jimmy.

Back at the rooming house, Peggy settles Millie into a warm bath and joins Jimmy, Mac, and Mona in the latter's apartment. Mac makes a pass at her and she runs back to her room. Jimmy brings her a sandwich and they open up to each other, sharing that neither has any experience in picking up strangers. Peggy invites Jimmy to climb up the roof through a skylight in her room and they continue talking, then kiss. Jimmy leaves very late at night, feeling very much in love. Mac sees him leave and decides that Peggy is free for the taking. He breaks into Peggy's room and tries to rape her but is stopped by Mona, who has heard the commotion from her downstairs apartment. Mona and Mac tussle and brawl all the way back down the stairs.

After three months of dating, Jimmy and Peggy decide to rent a house on Long Island if Jimmy can get a raise. Then Peggy discovers she is pregnant and hesitantly informs Jimmy, who is overjoyed and says they must get married right away. Mac and Millie, jealous of the couple's happiness, independently scheme to break them apart. When Jimmy comes late to the marriage-license bureau, missing Peggy, he heads to Peggy's rooming house and meets Mac on the way. Mac tells him that he had been in Peggy's room after Jimmy left that night, and Jimmy punches him. Jimmy then finds Millie in Peggy's apartment and questions her about Peggy's fidelity. Upset that he makes fun of her, Millie tells Jimmy that she and Peggy often pick up men. Jimmy hits Millie as well and goes out to find an agitated Peggy, who is standing in the street in the rain without an umbrella. Jimmy bombards her with accusations of her infidelity and Peggy is angry at him for believing these lies, but doesn't say a word in her defense. She runs back up to her room in tears and locks the door.

Distressed to see her friend in such a state, Millie goes out to the street to talk to Jimmy, followed by Mona and Mac. Just then the rooming house erupts in flames. The fire has been caused by dynamite stored in the basement by a drunkard; no one had believed him when he told them what he was doing. Realizing that Peggy is inside and Jimmy must save her, Millie admits that she lied to him out of jealousy. Mac also admits that he lied and Jimmy punches him again. Then Jimmy rushes into the smoke-filled building to save Peggy, but cannot open her door. He climbs up to the roof and jumps in through the skylight to find Peggy collapsed in her bed. He pulls her up to the roof to breathe fresh air and helps her cross over to another rooftop to wait for rescuers. He admits he was consumed with jealousy when he thought she was seeing other men, and says that he wouldn't want to go on living if something happened to her. He asks her to forgive him, and they embrace.

== Cast ==
- James Dunn as Jimmy
- ZaSu Pitts as Millie
- Minna Gombell as Mona
- Boots Mallory as Peggy

Uncredited

- Terrance Ray as Mac
- Will Stanton as Drunk
- Henry Kolker as Jamieson Brewster
- Walter Walker as Sedgwick
- Astrid Allwyn as Webster's secretary
- Claude King as Dr. A. Peterson
- Wade Boteler as passerby at apartment
- James Flavin as fireman

== Production history ==
=== Development of original film ===
Erich von Stroheim was hired by Fox Films to write and direct a film under the working title of Walking Down Broadway. On September 2, 1931, Fox executive Winfield Sheehan approved the project on several conditions. One was that von Stroheim, who was known for filming excessive footage, would be limited to shooting 85,000 feet of film, or 95 minutes of screen time.

The script was based on the unproduced play Walking Down Broadway by Dawn Powell. According to Fox staff writer Leonard Spigelgass, who assisted von Stroheim with the screenplay, the director "was chiefly interested in the neuroses" of the film's characters, who had been changed from "simple American characters into far more complicated ones, Viennese-oriented". Producer Sol M. Wurtzel urged von Stroheim to implement Wurtzel's idea of introducing the idea of marriage between the characters at the very beginning of the film to make them more "sympathetic". The final shooting script was filed on August 9, 1932, with the subtitle "An inconsequential story concerning small people along The Great White Way".

=== Casting ===
ZaSu Pitts, the star of von Stroheim's silent films Greed (1924) and The Wedding March (1928), was chosen by the director to play the part of Millie. Von Stroheim once called Pitts "the greatest psycho-pathological actress in the American cinema"; in this film, he envisioned her as the centerpiece of the story, the "romantic martyr". Von Stroheim originally wanted George Raft to play Mac; the part was ultimately filled by Terrance Ray. Boots Mallory was a newcomer to film, and James Dunn was a Fox contract player who had made his screen debut in the 1931 film Bad Girl. Cinematographer James Wong Howe alleged that von Stroheim physically bruised Mallory when she was too exhausted to cry on cue. Von Stroheim also ran a 12 ft (3.7 m) length of thread up Dunn's pant leg, tied to Dunn's genitals, and tugged upon it every time he wanted the actor to show more emotion in his scenes.

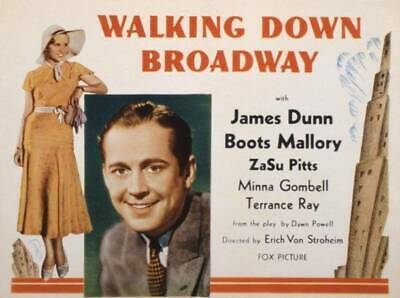
Lobby card

=== Filming ===
Von Stroheim completed the filming of Walking Down Broadway in 48 days from August to October 1932, on a budget of $300,000. Fox executives were pleased with von Stroheim's timeliness and planned to hire him to direct another film. But upon viewing the footage, they balked at the "sexual obsessions, neuroses, and other grim aspects of the film". According to White, the screening audience was composed of "studio lot secretaries" and the feedback was that the production was "morbid, unpleasant, strange, and unsavory". Wurtzel, who was involved in a "power struggle" at the studio with Sheehan, led the push to re-edit and re-shoot the film. Spigelgass later wrote that Sheehan was the one who fired von Stroheim from the project.

=== Re-editing and re-shooting ===
To protect the studio's reputation, false reports were sent out to industry trade journals blaming the need to cut the film on von Stroheim's penchant for filming excessive footage. A November 1932 article in Variety reported:

[Fox] decided to remake about 50% of the picture. … Impossible story plus miscasting of Zasu Pitts and Boots Mallory are the reasons. … James Dunn and Terrance Ray, other two members of the cast, gave poor performances with the direction rather than their ability blamed for the result.

Writer Edwin Burke, coming off an Academy Award win for Best Adapted Screenplay for the Fox film Bad Girl, was brought in to script new scenes and also direct some retakes, as did directors Alfred L. Werker and Raoul Walsh. (Note: While a New York Times article mentioned Alan Crosland as another director on the project, the American Film Institute did not find any material to corroborate this.) Wurtzel assumed responsibility for the re-shooting, which extended from February to March 1933 and cost $62,000. The film was renamed Hello, Sister! and released without a directorial credit. Von Stroheim had no say in the re-editing of the film. After this experience, he left directing and went into acting.

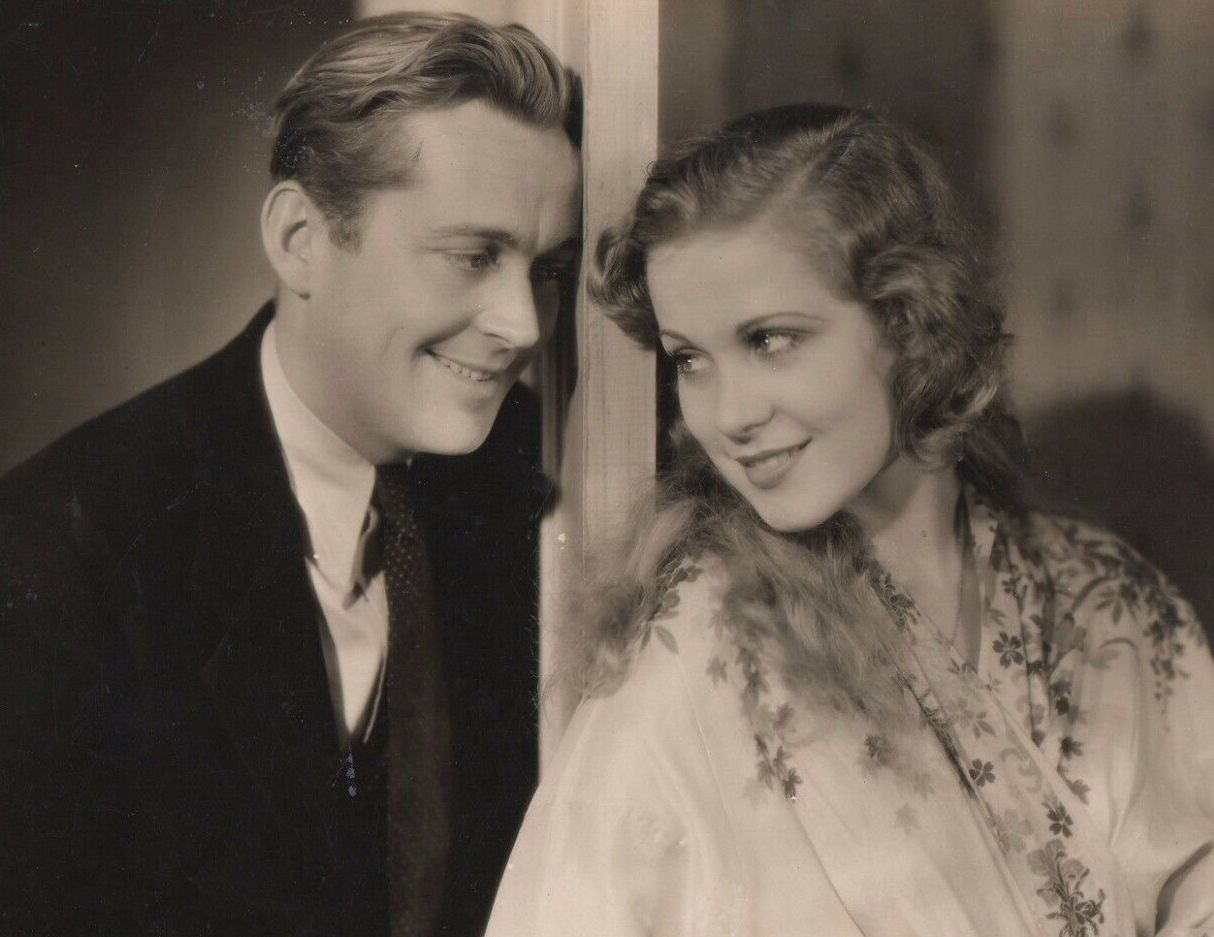
Publicity photo of James Dunn and Boots Mallory in the film

=== Comparison between versions ===
The final cut, which clocked in at 61 minutes, bore little resemblance to the original in tone and characterization. The films differ in emphasis in many places, particularly in the characters of Mac and Millie. According to the AFI Catalog of Feature Films, Mac is even more vulgar in Walking Down Broadway, while Millie plays a more important role thematically. Hello, Sister! changed the original characterization of "the turtle-petting, hunchback-befriending, blood and pickle-loving Millie" into a comedic presence right from the start.

The most obvious difference between the films is their endings. In the original, the apartment blaze is caused by Millie trying to kill herself by opening the gas in her oven. The action then switches to her hospital bed, where she encourages Jimmy and Peggy to reunite and then "succumbs to an agonizing, terrifying death". In the re-edited film, the apartment blaze is caused by dynamite that has been stored in the basement by a drunkard, who also functions as comic relief.

Through analysis of the production stills from Walking Down Broadway, film historian William K. Everson has estimated that about 60% of Hello, Sister! comes from von Stroheim's footage, while von Stroheim biographer Richard Koszarski asserts that 75% of the final cut contains von Stroheim's work. Based on the re-shooting script dated February 6, 1933, the American Film Institute determined that the following scenes were shot by von Stroheim:

some shots of the "walk down Broadway"; Millie's dialogue with Jimmy as they walk about her fondness for funerals; Jimmy finding the injured dog; Millie falling in the sewer and Jimmy rescuing her; hallway shots as Jimmy goes to Peggy's apartment; Jimmy and Peggy climbing up to look out the skylight in her apartment (however most of the apartment scene is new); Mac's attempted rape of Peggy and his subsequent fight with Mona; Jimmy's talk with his boss in the bank; the marriage license bureau scenes; Jimmy and Peggy's argument in the rain; Peggy's return to the apartment; the fight in the street; the explosion and most of the fire sequence.

Noting the studio's upheaval of von Stroheim's original intent, film historians have decried Hello, Sister! as "an uncredited mediocrity", a "mutilated, garbled and partially reshot" film, and "a mongrel artifact".

== Release ==
Hello, Sister! was released on April 14, 1933. It was marketed in England under the title Clipped Wings. The film was a box-office flop.

== Critical reception ==
Colin Patrick of The Indianapolis Star said the characters, the setting, and Dunn's presence in the film all drew comparisons to Bad Girl (1931), which launched Dunn's film career, "but Hello, Sister lacks the simple, human sincerity of that good play". He also called the storyline "hokum", explaining: "When they have to have an explosion caused by a habitual drunk with a mania for collecting dynamite to arrive at a climax, you may be sure that the story tellers are running out of ideas". Gilbert Kanour of the Baltimore Evening Sun panned the film, writing: "Half a dozen actors do the best they can to make 'Hello Sister' something else than a dull torment, but the task is too much for them". Mollie Merrick felt the film should win "worst picture of the year", writing: "It cost plenty; was completely remade, launched a new star who is everything but star material, and was just one colossal bore". The Film Daily noted that the film is "[f]or adults only. Its story is hackneyed and considerably off-color, with dialogue which at times cannot be described as wholesome". Harold R. Cohen of the Pittsburgh Post-Gazette did not even bother reviewing the film upon its 1933 release; referring to the combined cost of the original and re-edited versions, he summed it up as "$375,000 worth of pure, unadulterated cinematic garbage".

Some contemporary reviews endorsed the romantic elements of the film. The Hartford Courant wrote:

Hello Sister is a typical James Dunn picture, full of sweetness and light and young romance. … James Dunn gives his usual ingratiating performance and Miss Mallory is delightful. ZaSu Pitts competently handles the comedy relief, and Terrance Ray is about as disagreeable a villain as one can conceive. Minna Gombell is excellent as the girl whose morals aren't proof against diamonds.

The Kansas City Star credits Mallory, Dunn, and Pitts for lifting the film above its forgettable plot, writing:

For its real entertainment comes from the beauty and charm of Boots Mallory (who saves the picture), from Jimmy Dunn's always welcome portrayal of an earnest and honest young punk in the city, from Zasu Pitts' comedy and from the tender and sympathetic handling of the 'pick-up' problem as it affects girls who want to be good but who don't want to be lonesome.

The Daily News singled out the film's unusual substitution of the love triangle for a "rectangle"—"two men after the same girl and two girls after the same man". The Akron Beacon Journal stated that the film is "aimed at the feminine trade and the romance is frequently relieved by laughs".

== Preservation status ==
Hello, Sister! was thought to have been lost until film historian Everson discovered a print in the early 1970s. Hello, Sister! was publicly aired as part of the Film Forum's "Fox Before the Code" series in December 2006.

== Sources ==
- Bradley, Edwin M. (2020). Hollywood Musicals You Missed: Seventy Noteworthy Films from the 1930s. McFarland. ISBN 978-1-476-63993-2.
- Rosenbaum, Jonathan (2010). Goodbye Cinema, Hello Cinephilia: Film Culture in Transition. University of Chicago Press. ISBN 978-0-226-72665-6.
- Stumpf, Charles (2010). ZaSu Pitts: The Life and Career. McFarland. ISBN 978-0-786-46023-6.
