= The Crooked Trail =

1936 film

- Theatrical release poster
- Directed by: S. Roy Luby
- Written by: George H. Plympton (original story and screenplay)
- Produced by: A.W. Hackel (producer) (uncredited)
- Starring: See below
- Cinematography: Jack Greenhalgh
- Edited by: S. Roy Luby
- Release date: 1936
- Running time: 60 minutes
- Country: United States
- Language: English

The Crooked Trail is a 1936 American Western film directed by S. Roy Luby.

== Cast ==
- Johnny Mack Brown as Jim Blake
- Lucile Browne as Helen Carter
- John Merton as Harve Tarlton
- Charles King as Lanning
- Ted Adams as Estaban Solano
- John Van Pelt as Tex, a Miner
- Ed Cassidy as Grimby, a Miner
- Horace Murphy as Carter
