= Secrets of Chinatown =

1935 film

- Directed by: Fred C. Newmeyer
- Written by: Guy Morton
- Produced by: Kenneth J. Bishop
- Starring: Nick Stuart; Lucile Browne; James Flavin
- Cinematography: William Beckway
- Edited by: William Austin
- Production company: Commonwealth Productions
- Distributed by: Excellent Film Exchange (Canada); Syndicate Pictures (US)
- Release date: February 20, 1935
- Running time: 63 minutes
- Countries: Canada; United States
- Language: English

Secrets of Chinatown is a 1935 Canadian-American mystery thriller film directed by Fred C. Newmeyer and starring Nick Stuart, Lucile Browne and James Flavin.

The film was shot at the Willows Park Studios in Victoria, British Columbia and on location in Vancouver by Kenneth J. Bishop's Commonwealth Productions. It was not able to qualify for the British Quota which was a blow to its commercial prospects. Commonwealth went out of business before the film was released, and it was used as part of the arrangement to pay off creditors. When Bishop relaunched production with a new company two years later, he signed a distribution contract with Columbia Pictures and took much greater care to make sure his films were eligible for the British Quota.

== Plot ==
A private detective is brought in by the police commissioner to investigate the reasons for a major outbreak of crime in Chinatown.

== Cast ==
- Nick Stuart as Robert Rand
- Lucile Browne as Zenobia
- Raymond Lawrence as Donegal Dawn
- James Flavin as Brandhma
- Harry Hewitson a Chan Tow Ling
- James McGrath as Commissioner
- Reginald Hincks as Dr. Franklin
- John Barnard as Doverscourt
- Arthur Legge-Willis as Yogi of Madrada

== Bibliography ==
- Morris, Peter. Embattled Shadows: A History of Canadian Cinema, 1895-1939. McGill-Queen's Press - MQUP, 1992.
