= 'Neath the Arizona Skies =

1934 film by Harry L. Fraser

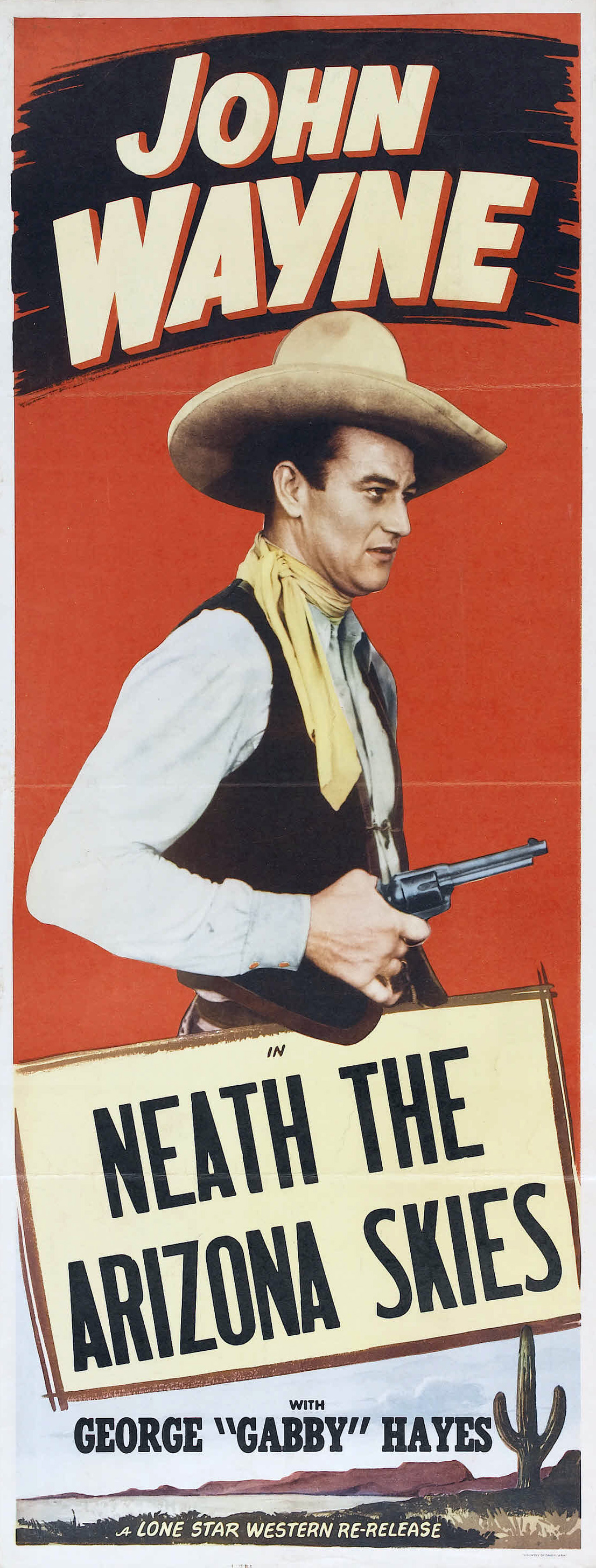
- Theatrical re-release poster
- Directed by: Harry L. Fraser
- Written by: Burl R. Tuttle
- Produced by: Paul Malvern for Lone Star Productions
- Starring: John Wayne; George "Gabby" Hayes
- Cinematography: Archie Stout
- Edited by: Charles J. Hunt
- Music by: Billy Barber
- Distributed by: Monogram Pictures Corporation
- Release date: December 5, 1934
- Running time: 52 minutes
- Country: United States
- Language: English

'Neath the Arizona Skies is a 1934 Western film directed by Harry L. Fraser, produced by Lone Star Productions, released by Monogram Pictures and starring John Wayne. Wayne's character attempts to locate a little girl's father, so that she may claim a $50,000 Indian oil claim. The film co-stars Sheila Terry and Shirley Jean Rickert. George "Gabby" Hayes played a featured character with a speaking role, but his name was omitted from the cast list in the opening credits.

'Neath the Arizona Skies

== Plot ==
Chris Morrell is the surrogate father of Nina, a young Indian girl who is a U.S. government ward because her father left her mother before birth and her mother died in childbirth. An oil strike makes Nina's mother's Indian oil land lease worth $50,000, which Morrell will get to take care of Nina if he can find her father and have him sign guardianship papers (or prove the father is dead).

Minions of Sam Black, the local outlaw ringleader, hear about the oil land claim and Black determines to collect it. The gang comes to take Nina from Morrell, but Morrell escapes with her. He sends her off on horseback to his friend Bud Moore's ranch while he deals with the outlaws, eventually stampeding their horses away. He makes his getaway but collapses in exhaustion near a brook. Nina arrives at the ranch only to discover Bud Moore died the year before. Nina gets taken care of by Matt Downing, a good-natured cook, in contrast to the obviously evil Vic Byrd, the new ranch owner who insists that she stay to do work.

Vic goes to town and robs $6,000 from a local businessman with the help of Bud Moore's brother, Jim. During his escape, Jim happens upon Morrell collapsed from exhaustion, and swaps clothes with him to deflect suspicion. Also riding home from town, Moore's sister Clara discovers the passed out Morrell in the clothes she had heard the local businessman describe as being worn by the robber. She revives him though she is suspicious of him and ties him up beforehand. When she learns he is Bud's friend, she frees him and takes him to her homestead, where he runs into Jim and recognizes him as the man that took his clothes, and therefore is the robber. They have words but Morrell does not tell Clara about Jim.

Matt informs Tom, another ranch worker, that Tom is Nina's father, which he knows because he was there with Morrell when Nina was born.

Vic and Jim go to retrieve the robbed money from the stump where Jim hid it and come across the stampeded horses of Sam Black and his gang. They gather the horses and when they run across a gang member, they ask to be led to Sam Black. Vic offers to turn Nina over to Black in exchange for $10,000 and Morrell's murder, to which Black readily agrees. Meanwhile, Morrell happens upon Matt, who tells him Nina is at the ranch with her father Tom, and the two ride off together. Jim leads Vic to the hidden money, where Vic shoots him and takes off with the cash. Morrell and Matt see Vic ride away and discover the bleeding Jim, who tells them Vic is going to the ranch to get Nina to turn over to Sam Black. Black's gang arrives at Clara's homestead looking for Morrell, and when she says he is not there, they force Clara to go with them.

Vic arrives at the ranch, where Tom is joyously playing with Nina. Vic insists on taking the girl, just as Morrell shows up. Nina yells at the front door to greet Morrell and runs out and jumps into his arms, and Vic follows, gun in hand, but just before he can shoot Morrell, Tom shoots Vic from inside.

Immediately after, Sam Black's gang arrives, and a shoot-out breaks out with Morrell, Tom and Nina taking cover in a cabin while Black and his gang retreat to the ranch house, which is close enough that they continue to shoot at each other. At a break in the shooting, Morrell and Tom realize they have only one bullet left and conspire about how to use it. Not knowing that, Black yells out to offer to trade Clara for Nina. Morrell offers himself instead, and they agree Morrell and Clara will walk past each other through the courtyard between the house and the cabin. The two start off, Morrell giving Tom a final instruction as he leaves to "be sure and use that last bullet right". After Morrell and Clara pass each other, Tom shoots the gun, and Morrell grunts and drops to the dirt.

Black's gang rushes past Morrell to get to Nina, but Morrell was playing dead and trips the last gang member to pass, just as the Sheriff arrives with a posse. Black goes in the cabin, knocks Tom down, shoves Clara aside, grabs Nina, shoots Tom (apparently dead), and jumps out the window with Nina. With the gang occupied in a shoot-out with the Sheriff's posse, Morrell rushes in the cabin and follows Black on horseback as the Sheriff and posse arrest the gang.

Black jumps off a cliff with his horse and Nina into a small lake, and Morrell leaps after them, sans horse. Morrell and Black fight under the water while Nina (she is really back now!) struggles out with the horse. Bubbles emerge at the surface, followed by Morrell, who swims to Nina and hugs her as bubbles pop up from the spot where Black was, his last gasp.

In a final comical scene typical of B-movies of the era, Matt and Nina giggle in fits as they peek in on Morrell and Clara stealing some smooches.

== Cast ==
- John Wayne as Chris Morrell
- Sheila Terry as Clara Moore
- Shirley Jean Rickert as Nina (credited as Shirley Jane Rickert)
- Jack Rockwell as Vic Byrd
- Yakima Canutt as Sam Black
- Harry L. Fraser as henchman in the brush (credited as Weston Edwards)
- Jay Wilsey as Jim Moore (credited as Buffalo Bill Jr.)
- Philip Kieffer as Jameson Hodges (credited as Phil Keefer)
- Earl Dwire as Tom
- George "Gabby" Hayes as Matt Downing (uncredited)

== See also ==
- John Wayne filmography
- Yakima Canutt filmography
