= Boots Mallory =

American actress, dancer, and model (1913–1958)

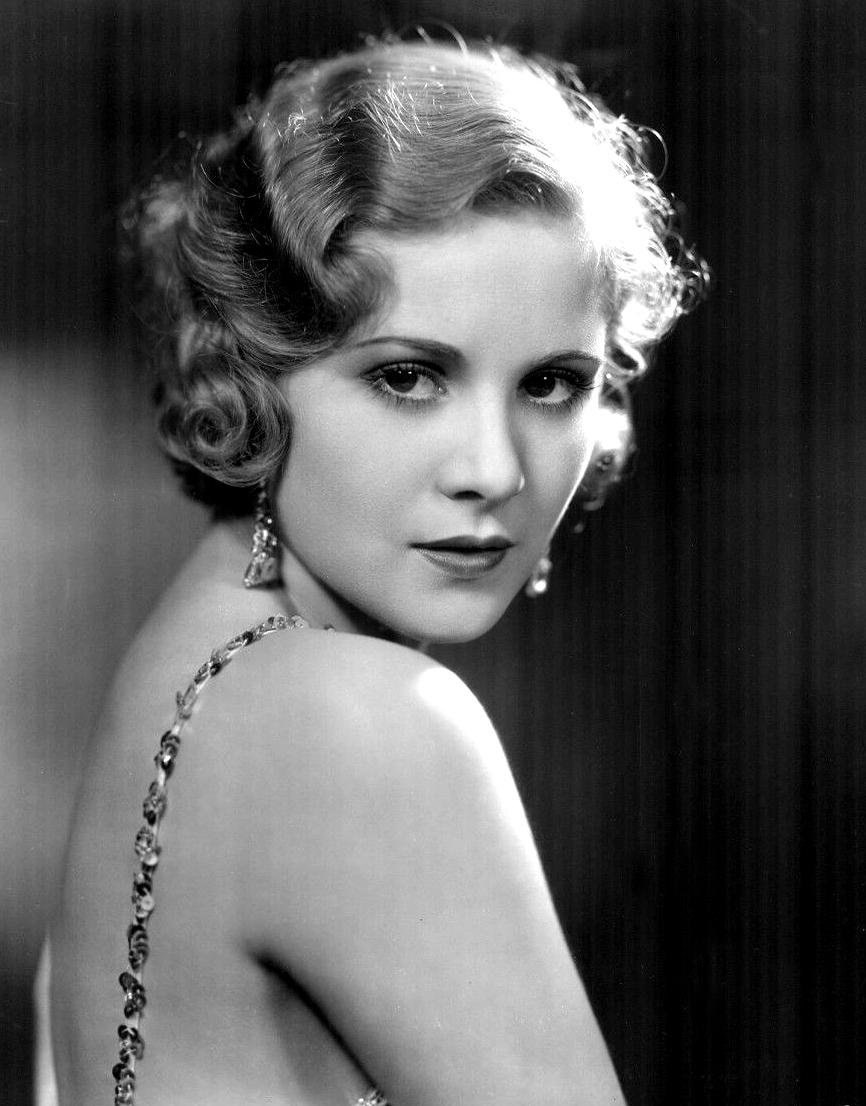
- Mallory in 1934
- Born: Patricia Mallory; October 22, 1913
- Died: December 1, 1958 (aged 45); Santa Monica, California, U.S.
- Years active: 1932–1938
- Spouses: William Cagney (m. 1933; div. 1946) Herbert Marshall (m. 1947)
- Children: 2

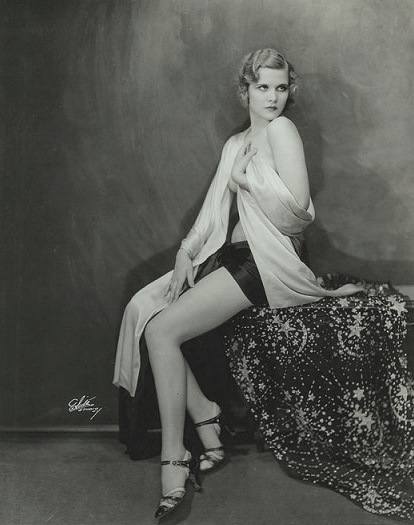
Boots Mallory, by Luther S. White, 1930s

Patricia "Boots" Mallory (October 22, 1913 – December 1, 1958) was an American film actress, dancer, and model.

== Career ==
Mallory was born on October 22, 1913. She grew up in Mobile, Alabama, where her father operated a tugboat. She became a model for the Walter Thornton Modeling Agency in New York.

Moving to Hollywood, she found employment with Fox Films and was cast in the film version of Dawn Powell's play Walking Down Broadway. This was the first sound film by Erich von Stroheim. He shared both screenwriting and directing credits and regarded Mallory as his discovery. The play told the story of a young unmarried woman involved in a love triangle who becomes pregnant. The finished film, however, strongly suggested a lesbian relationship between Mallory's character and the character played by ZaSu Pitts. Other sexual themes involving the character played by James Dunn were considered too daring. Fox executives brought in director Alfred L. Werker to drastically cut Von Stroheim's version and to shoot additional scenes. The film was finally released under the new title Hello, Sister! (1933) with little promotion and was not a success. Von Stroheim's original version was neither copyrighted nor released, and is considered lost.

In 1932 her second completed film, Handle with Care, also co-starring James Dunn, was released and marked her debut. Mallory was chosen as one of the WAMPAS Baby Stars of 1932.

A tall blonde, Mallory was well regarded for her striking looks and was photographed by such photographers as Alfred Cheney Johnston, Hal Phyfe, and George Hurrell. She also was painted nude by the pin-up artist Rolf Armstrong.

Over the next few years, Mallory played the lead in several "B" pictures, including the Rin Tin Tin serial The Wolf Dog (1933), and received top-billing in Carnival Lady (1934) and The Big Race (1934). On radio she worked with James Cagney in productions for Lux Radio Theatre. She made her final film appearance in an uncredited role in the Laurel and Hardy film Swiss Miss (1938).

== Personal life ==
Mallory was first married at the age of 16, and by 1933 had married her second husband, film producer William Cagney, brother of James Cagney. She and William Cagney had two children, fraternal twins Jill and Stephan. She was married to Herbert Marshall. She died after a long illness in Santa Monica, California, on December 1, 1958.

== Filmography ==
- Handle with Care (1932)
- Humanity (1933)
- Hello, Sister! (1933)
- The Wolf Dog (1933)
- Carnival Lady (1933)
- The Big Race (1934)
- Sing Sing Nights (1934)
- Powdersmoke Range (1935)
- Here's Flash Casey (1938)
- Swiss Miss (1938) (uncredited)
