= Young as You Feel (1931 film) =

1931 film

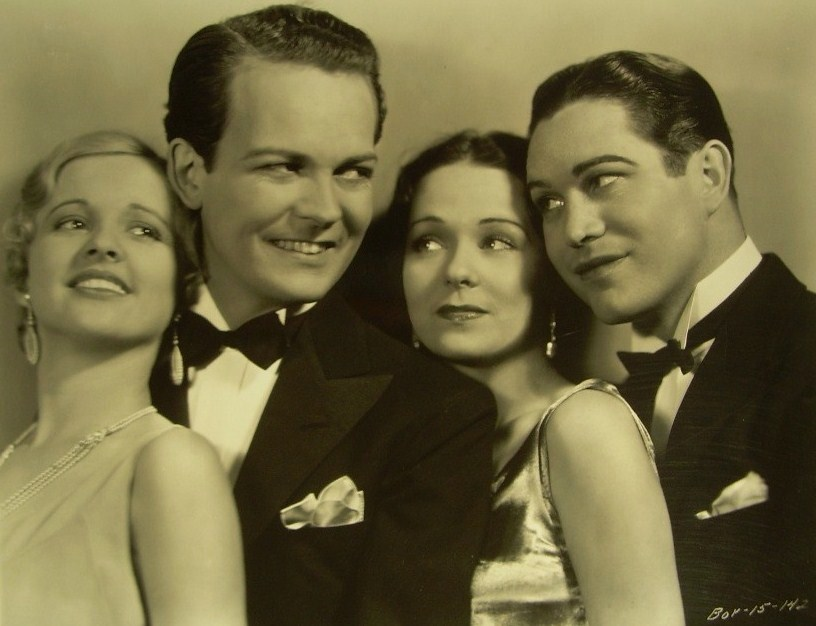
- Lucile Browne, Don Dillaway, Rosalie Roy, and Terrance Ray
- Directed by: Frank Borzage
- Written by: George Ade (play); Edwin J. Burke
- Starring: Will Rogers; Fifi D'Orsay; Lucien Littlefield
- Cinematography: Chester A. Lyons
- Edited by: Margaret Clancey
- Production company: Fox Film Corporation
- Distributed by: Fox Film Corporation
- Release date: August 23, 1931
- Running time: 78 minutes
- Country: United States
- Language: English

Young as You Feel is a 1931 American pre-Code comedy film directed by Frank Borzage and starring Will Rogers, Fifi D'Orsay, and Lucien Littlefield. The story was later remade by Fox in 1940 under the same title as part of the Jones Family series of films.

== Cast ==
- Will Rogers as Lemuel Morehouse
- Fifi D'Orsay as Fleurette
- Lucien Littlefield as Noah Marley
- Don Dillaway as Billy Morehouse
- Terrance Ray as Tom Morehouse
- Lucile Browne as Dorothy Gregson
- Rosalie Roy as Rose Gregson
- Gregory Gaye as Pierre
- John T. Murray as Colonel Stanhope
- Brandon Hurst as Robbins
- C. Henry Gordon as Harry Lamson
- Marcia Harris as Mrs. Denton
- Otto Hoffman as Secretary
- Joan Standing as Lemuel's Secretary
- Bob Burns as Colorado Detective
- Eddy Chandler as Death of a Faun Picket
- Harvey Clark as Colorado Hotel Manager
- Charles Coleman as Butler
- Paul Fix as Desk Clerk
- Tom Kennedy as Colorado Detective
- Cecilia Parker as Undetermined Role
- James Pierce as Jack, a Cop

== Bibliography ==
- Goble, Alan. The Complete Index to Literary Sources in Film. Walter de Gruyter, 1999.
