= The Brand of Hate =

1934 film

- Lobby card
- Directed by: Lewis D. Collins
- Written by: Jack Natteford
- Produced by: A.W. Hackel
- Starring: Bob Steele; Lucile Browne; William Farnum
- Cinematography: William C. Thompson
- Edited by: S. Roy Luby
- Production company: Supreme Pictures
- Distributed by: Commodore Pictures
- Release date: November 2, 1934
- Running time: 63 minutes
- Country: United States
- Language: English

The Brand of Hate is a 1934 American Western film directed by Lewis D. Collins and starring Bob Steele, Lucile Browne and William Farnum.

== Cast ==
- Bob Steele as Rod Camp
- Lucile Browne as Margie Larkins
- William Farnum as Joe Larkins
- Mickey Rentschler as Bud Larkins
- George 'Gabby' Hayes as Bill Larkins
- James Flavin as Holt Larkins
- Archie Ricks] as Slim Larkins
- Charles K. French as Mr. Camp
- Jack Rockwell as Sheriff Bailey
- Rose Plumer as Mrs. Camp
- Blackie Whiteford as Camp Ranch Hand
- Bill Patton as Camp Ranch Hand
