= The Airmail Mystery =

1932 film

- Film poster
- Directed by: Ray Taylor
- Written by: Ella O'Neill (story); Basil Dickey; George H. Plympton; George Morgan
- Produced by: Henry MacRae
- Starring: James Flavin; Al Wilson; Walter Brennan; Wheeler Oakman
- Music by: David Broekman
- Distributed by: Universal Pictures
- Release date: March 28, 1932
- Running time: 12 chapters (225 min.)
- Country: United States
- Language: English

The Airmail Mystery is a 1932 Universal pre-Code movie serial directed by Ray Taylor, written by Ella O'Neill, starring James Flavin and Wheeler Oakman, and featuring Al Wilson doing the aerial stunts. The Airmail Mystery was Universal's first aviation serial that set the pattern for the aviation serials and feature films to follow. The film also marks the film debut of James Flavin. The Airmail Mystery is considered a lost film.

== Plot ==
Airmail pilot Bob Lee, owner of a gold mine, faces off against "The Black Hawk" who has kidnapped Jimmy Ross, Bob's best friend. The Black Hawk carries out a series of attacks on Bob's ore shipments by air, using an unusual catapult device that launches aircraft into the sky to intercept Bob's aircraft. With his sweetheart, Mary Ross, Bob constantly battles against his enemy, and eventually is able to defeat him.

== Chapter titles ==
1. Pirates of the Air
2. Hovering Death
3. A Leap for Life
4. A Fatal Crash
5. The Hawk Strikes
6. The Bridge of Destruction
7. The Hawk's Treachery
8. The Aerial Third Degree
9. The Attack on the Mine
10. The Hawk's Lair
11. The Law Strikes
12. The Mail Must Go Through

_{Source:}

== Cast ==
- James Flavin as Bob Lee
- Lucile Browne as Mary Ross
- Wheeler Oakman as Judson Ward ("The Black Hawk")
- Frank Hagney as Moran
- Sidney Bracey as Driscoll
- Nelson McDowell as "Silent" Simms
- Walter Brennan as Holly
- Al Wilson as Jimmy Ross
- Bruce Mitchell as Capt. Grant
- Jack Holley as Andy

== Production ==
Al Wilson (who played the hero's sidekick Jimmy Ross in the serial) worked together with stuntmen like Frank Clarke and Wally Timm and also for movie companies, including Universal Pictures. After numerous appearances in stunt roles, he started his actor career in 1923, with the serial, The Eagle's Talons. He produced his own movies until 1927, when he went back to work with Universal. Wilson was also one of the pilots in Hell's Angels (1930) and during filming, he was involved in an accident where the mechanic Phil Jones died. This episode marked the end of his career as stunt pilot in movies, although he continued to work as an actor.

Wilson's last role was in The Airmail Mystery. After production was complete, during the National Air Races in Cleveland in 1932, Wilson's aircraft crashed and he died a few days later in hospital due to the injuries he suffered. (Note: The accident is documented in the film Pylon Dusters: 1932 and 1938 Air Races, an historic film about the 1932 Cleveland Air Race.)

== See also ==
- List of American films of 1932
- List of film serials by year
- List of film serials by studio

Preceded by Detective Lloyd (1932)	Universal Serial; The Airmail Mystery (1932)	Succeeded by Heroes of the West (1932)
