= Cannonball Express (film) =

1932 film

- Directed by: Wallace Fox
- Written by: Bernard McConville
- Produced by: Fanchon Royer
- Starring: Rex Lease; Tom Moore; Lucile Browne
- Cinematography: Arthur Reed
- Edited by: Carl Himm
- Music by: Lee Zahler
- Production company: Fanchon Royer Pictures
- Distributed by: Sono Art-World Wide Pictures; Gaumont British Distributors (UK)
- Release date: February 7, 1932
- Running time: 59 minutes
- Country: United States
- Language: English

Cannonball Express is a 1932 American action film directed by Wallace Fox and starring Rex Lease, Tom Moore and Lucile Browne.

== Cast ==
- Rex Lease as Ned Logan
- Tom Moore as John Logan
- Lucile Browne as Sally
- Leon Ames as Jack Logan
- Ruth Renick as Mary Logan

== Bibliography ==
- Langman, Larry & Finn, Daniel. A Guide to American Crime Films of the Thirties. Greenwood Press, 1995.
