= Handle with Care (1932 film) =

1932 film

- Directed by: David Butler
- Screenplay by: Frank Craven; Sam Mintz
- Story by: David Butler
- Produced by: Randall Faye; George King
- Starring: James Dunn; Boots Mallory; El Brendel; Victor Jory
- Cinematography: John Schmitz
- Edited by: Irene Morra
- Music by: R.H. Bassett; Peter Brunelli
- Distributed by: 20th Century Fox
- Release date: December 25, 1932
- Running time: 72 minutes
- Country: United States
- Language: English

Handle with Care is a 1932 American pre-Code film directed by David Butler and starring James Dunn, Boots Mallory, and El Brendel. Victor Jory appears in a supporting role. The film's working title was Divided by Two.

== Cast ==
- James Dunn as Bill Gordon
- Boots Mallory as Helen Barlow
- El Brendel as Carl Lundstrom
- Victor Jory as 1st Public Enemy
- George Ernest as Charlie
- Frank Craven as Radio Announcer
- Pat Hartigan as Callahan
- Frank O'Connor as Police Lieutenant
- Buster Phelps as Tommy
- Louise Carver as Hat Customer
- Heinie Conklin as Cook
- Jane Withers as Young Girl
