= Lucile Browne =

American actress (1907–1976)

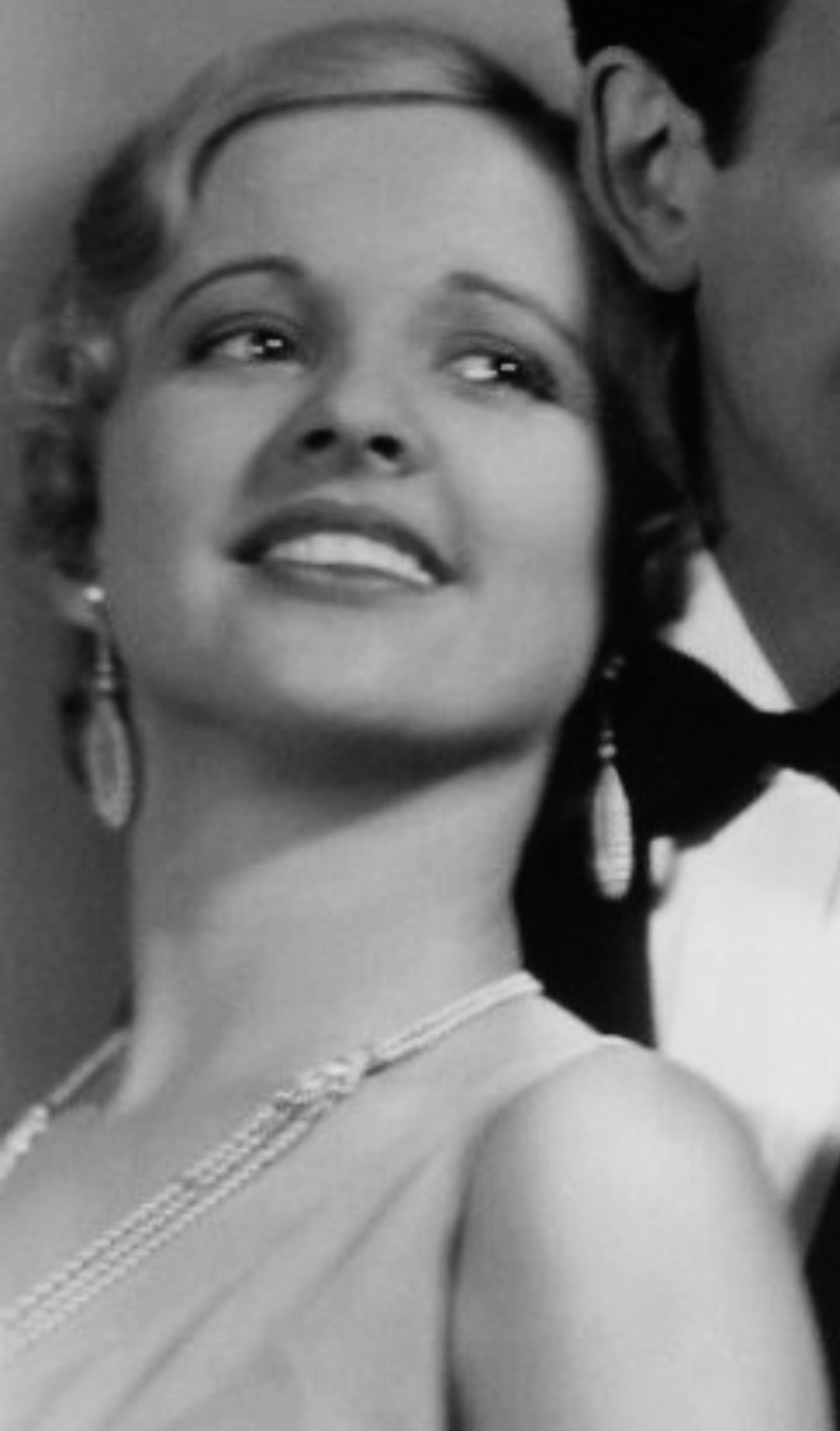
- Browne in Young as You Feel (1931)
- Born: Lucile Ruth Browne; March 18, 1907; Memphis, Tennessee, U.S.
- Died: May 10, 1976 (aged 69); Lexington, Virginia, U.S.
- Other names: Lucille Browne
- Occupation: Actress
- Years active: 1914–1950
- Spouse: James Flavin (m. 1932; died 1976)
- Children: 1

Lucile Ruth Browne (March 18, 1907 – May 10, 1976) was an American film actress. She starred opposite John Wayne in the 1935 films Texas Terror and Rainbow Valley.

== Personal life ==
The daughter of Mr. and Mrs. Harris L. Browne, she was born in Memphis, Tennessee, and moved to St. Petersburg, Florida in 1923. She began studying elocution when she was 10 years old, studied under an instructor from the University of Chicago, and attended Noyes School of Expression in Boston, Massachusetts. She was a 1925 graduate of St. Petersburg High School.

In 1926, Browne was named Miss Florida in a beauty contest sponsored by the Tampa Times as judges selected her based on photographs of dozens of candidates. She had been named Miss St. Petersburg by a magazine the previous year. Before she made films, she worked as a model in New York and acted with a theatrical company in Chicago.

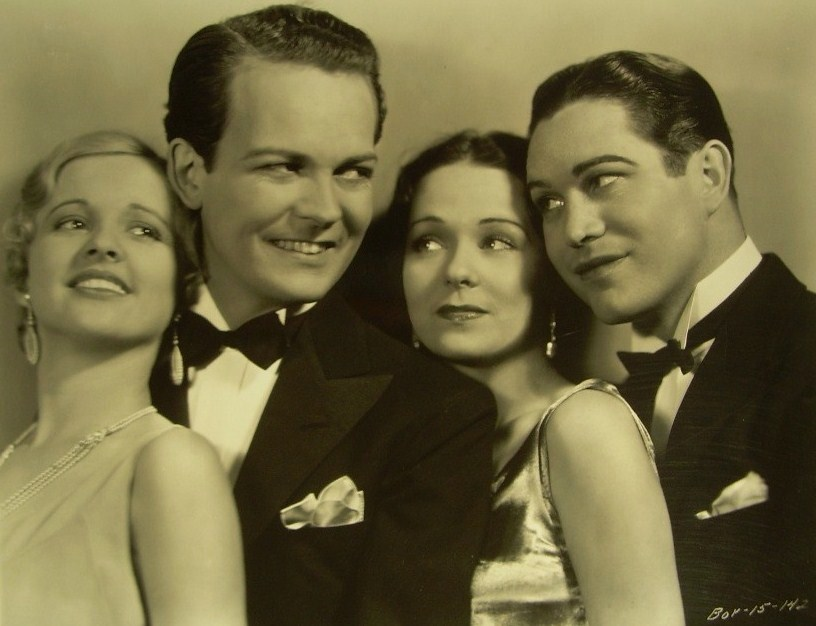
Frank Borzage's Young as You Feel (1931)

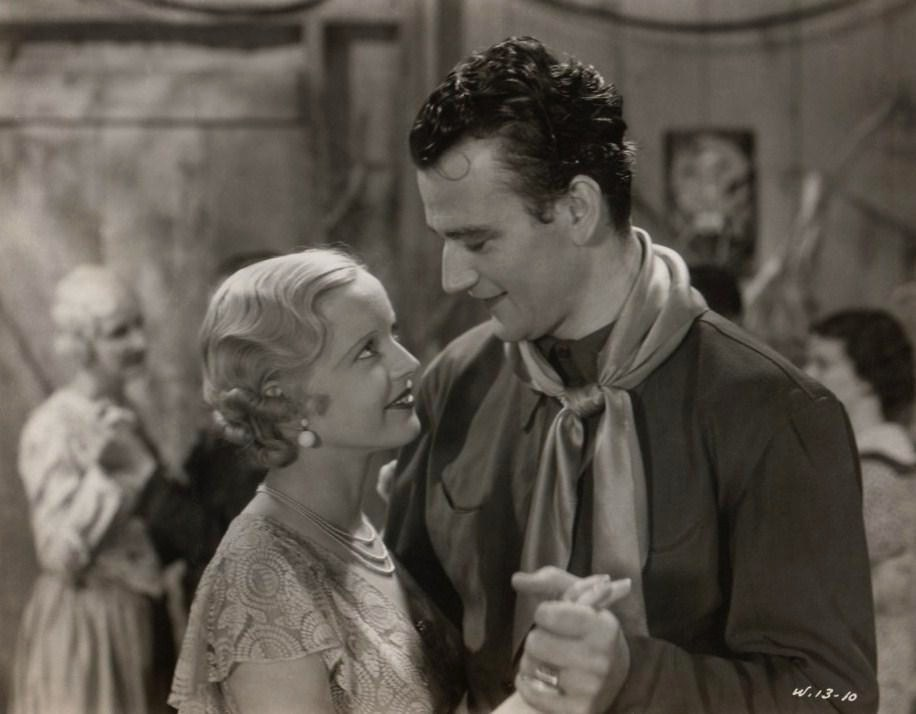
Browne and John Wayne in Texas Terror (1935)

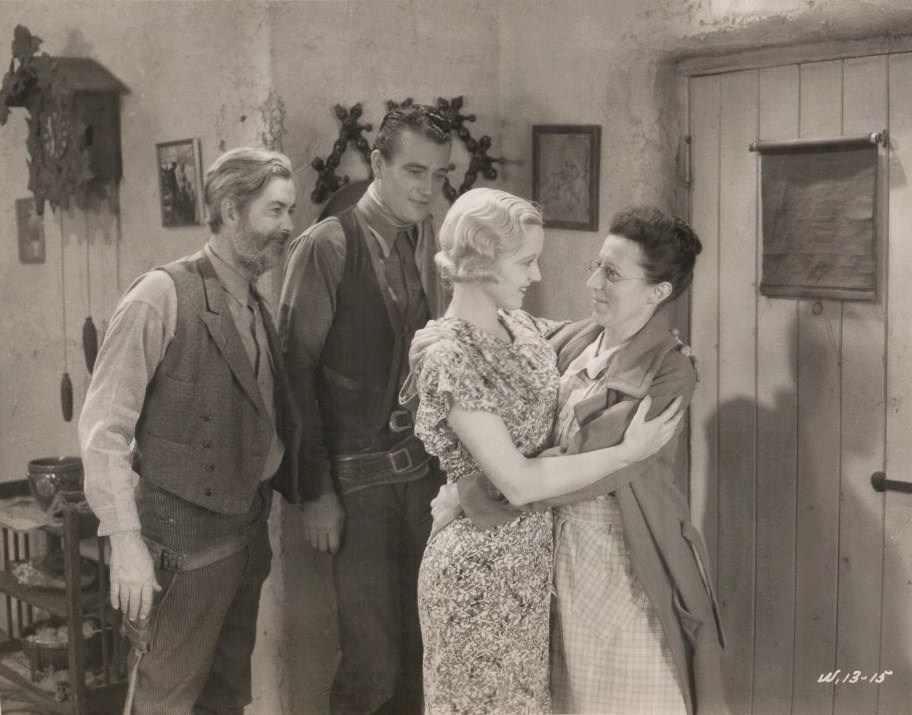
Gabby Hayes, John Wayne, Browne and Fern Emmett in Texas Terror (1935)

While filming The Airmail Mystery in 1932, Browne met her future husband, actor James Flavin. They married soon after and stayed together for more than 40 years until his death April 23, 1976. Browne died 17 days later on May 10. The couple had one son, Dr. William James Flavin, a professor.

== Partial filmography ==
- The Last of the Duanes (1930) - Ruth Garrett
- Soup to Nuts (1930) - Louise - Otto's Niece
- Young as You Feel (1931) - Dorothy Gregson
- Danger Island (1931, Serial) - Bonnie Adams
- Girls About Town (1931) - Edna Howard
- Battling with Buffalo Bill (1931) - Jane Mills
- The Texan (1932) - Mary Lou
- Cannonball Express (1932) - Sally
- The Airmail Mystery (1932) - Mary Ross
- The Last of the Mohicans (1932, Serial) - Alice Munro
- Parole Girl (1933) - Miss Manning (uncredited)
- Fra Diavolo (1933) - Zerlina
- King of the Arena (1933) - Mary Hiller
- Double Harness (1933) - Valerie Colby Moore
- The Crimson Paradise (1933) - Connie
- Flying Down to Rio (1933) - Belinha's Friend (uncredited)
- The Mystery Squadron (1933) - Dorothy Gray
- Now I'll Tell (1934) - Nurse (scenes deleted)
- Hide-Out (1934) - Blonde with Headache (uncredited)
- The Law of the Wild (1934) - Alice Ingram
- Elinor Norton (1934) - Publisher's Staff (uncredited)
- The Brand of Hate (1934) - Margie Larkins
- Texas Terror (1935) - Bess Mathews
- Secrets of Chinatown (1935) - Zenobia
- Rainbow Valley (1935) - Eleanor
- On Probation (1935) - Jane Murray
- Western Frontier (1935) - Mary Harper
- Tumbling Tumbleweeds (1935) - Jerry
- Magnificent Obsession (1935) - Nurse (uncredited)
- The Crooked Trail (1936) - Helen Carter
- Cheyenne Rides Again (1937) - Sally Lane
- Dead End (1937) - Well-Dressed Woman (uncredited)
- Sweethearts (1938) - Chorus Girl (uncredited)
- Missing Daughters (1939) - Estelle (uncredited)
- Ride, Tenderfoot, Ride (1940) - Marcia (uncredited)
- Doctors Don't Tell (1941) - (uncredited)
- A Tragedy at Midnight (1942) - Nurse (uncredited)
- Once Upon a Time (1944) - Miss Flemming (uncredited)
- Ladies of Washington (1944) - Taxi Passenger (uncredited)
- The Thin Man Goes Home (1944) - Skating Woman (uncredited)
- A Woman of Distinction (1950) - Manicurist (uncredited)
- No Sad Songs for Me (1950) - Mrs. Hendrickson (uncredited)
