= Murray Seldeen =

American film editor

- Born: November 9, 1904; Massachusetts, United States
- Died: December 10, 1987 (aged 83); Riverside, California; United States
- Occupation: Editor
- Years active: 1932–1966 (film)

Murray Seldeen (November 9, 1904 – December 10, 1987) was an American film editor.

== Selected filmography ==
- The Texan (1932)
- One Exciting Adventure (1934)
- It Happened in New York (1935)
- Navy Blues (1937)
- Hit the Saddle (1937)
- Romance on the Run (1938)
- Storm Over Bengal (1938)
- Woman Doctor (1939)
- Hit Parade of 1941 (1940)

== Bibliography ==
- Allan R. Ellenberger. Ramon Novarro: A Biography of the Silent Film Idol, 1899-1968; With a Filmography. McFarland, 1999.
