= The Big Race =

1934 film by Fred C. Newmeyer

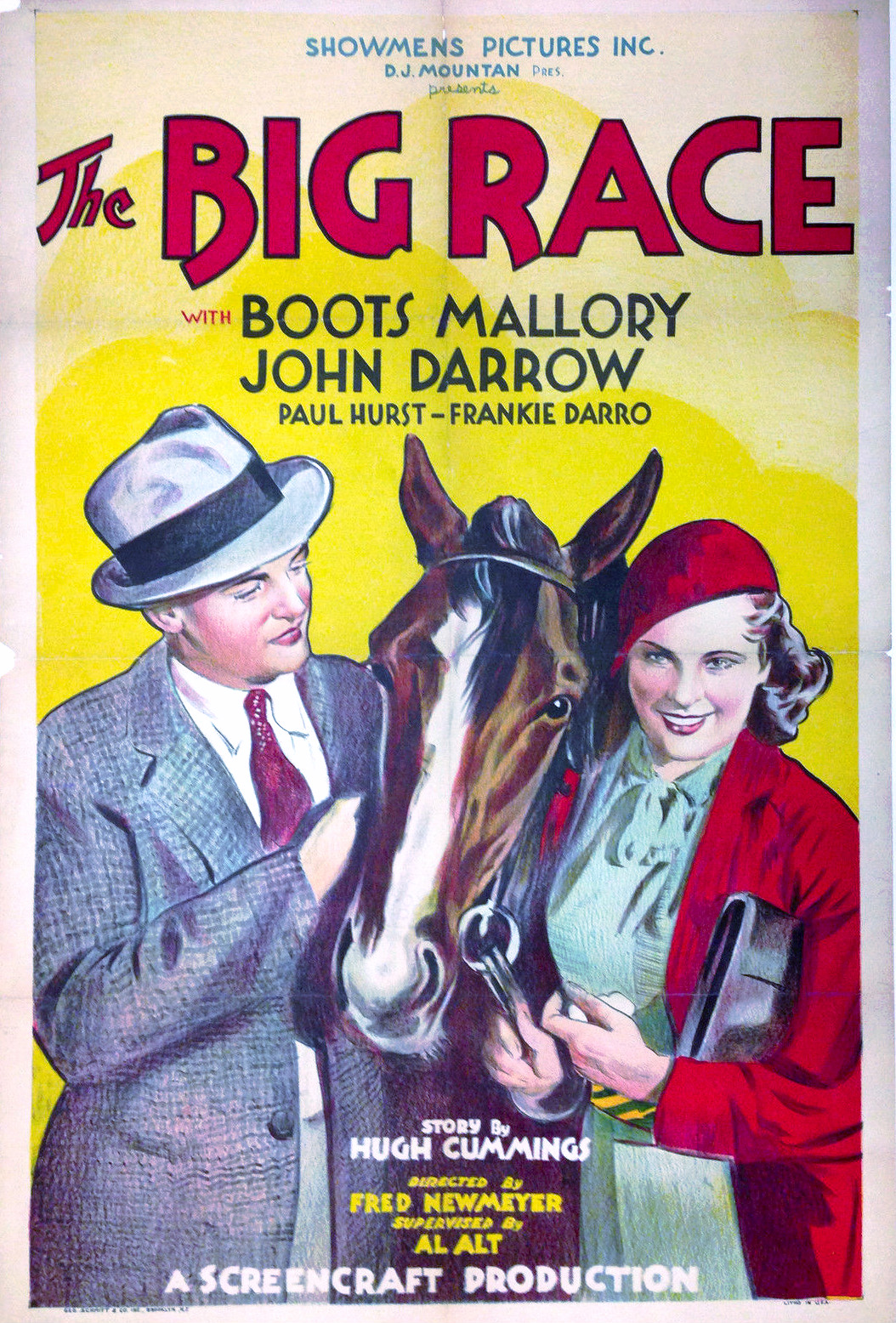
- Theatrical release poster
- Directed by: Fred C. Newmeyer
- Written by: Hugh Cummings
- Starring: Boots Mallory; John Darrow; Paul Hurst
- Cinematography: George Meehan
- Edited by: S. Roy Luby
- Production company: Screencraft Productions
- Distributed by: Showmen's Pictures
- Release date: 1934
- Running time: 68 minutes
- Country: United States
- Language: English

The Big Race is a 1934 American film directed by Fred C. Newmeyer.

It was also known as Raising the Wind.

== Cast ==
- Boots Mallory as Patricia
- John Darrow as Bob Hamilton
- Paul Hurst as Skipper O'Nea
