= Frank E. Hull =

American film editor

- Born: October 17, 1882; Wheatland, Kansas, United States
- Died: May 22, 1968 (aged 85); Los Angeles, California, United States
- Occupation: Film editor
- Years active: 1920-1950

Frank E. Hull (1882–1968) was an American film editor. He spent many years working for Fox Film and MGM.

== Selected filmography ==
- Just Out of College (1920)
- The Penalty (1920)
- Out of the Storm (1920)
- The Merry Widow (1925)
- The Wedding March (1928)
- The Awful Truth (1929)
- Up the River (1930)
- Born Reckless (1930)
- Seas Beneath (1931)
- Merely Mary Ann (1931)
- Hello, Sister! (1933)
- I Loved You Wednesday (1933)
- Student Tour (1934)
- Evelyn Prentice (1934)
- This Side of Heaven (1934)
- No More Ladies (1935)
- The Unguarded Hour (1936)
- Lord Jeff (1938)
- The Adventures of Huckleberry Finn (1939)
- The Secret of Dr. Kildare (1939)
- Thunder Afloat (1939)
- Florian (1940)
- Dulcy (1940)
- Come Live with Me (1941)
- Somewhere I'll Find You (1942)
- Nazi Agent (1942)
- Slightly Dangerous (1943)
- Maisie Goes to Reno (1944)
- Merton of the Movies (1947)

== Bibliography ==
- Solomon, Aubrey. The Fox Film Corporation, 1915-1935: A History and Filmography. McFarland, 2011.
