= White Thunder =

White Thunder may refer to:

- original title of The Viking (1931 film)
- White Thunder, a 2002 documentary about Varick Frissell, producer of The Viking
- White Thunder (film), a 1925 film starring Yakima Canutt
- nickname of Scott Steiner, American professional wrestler
- White Thunder, Cheyenne medicine man and father of Owl Woman
