= The Wolf Dog =

1933 American film series

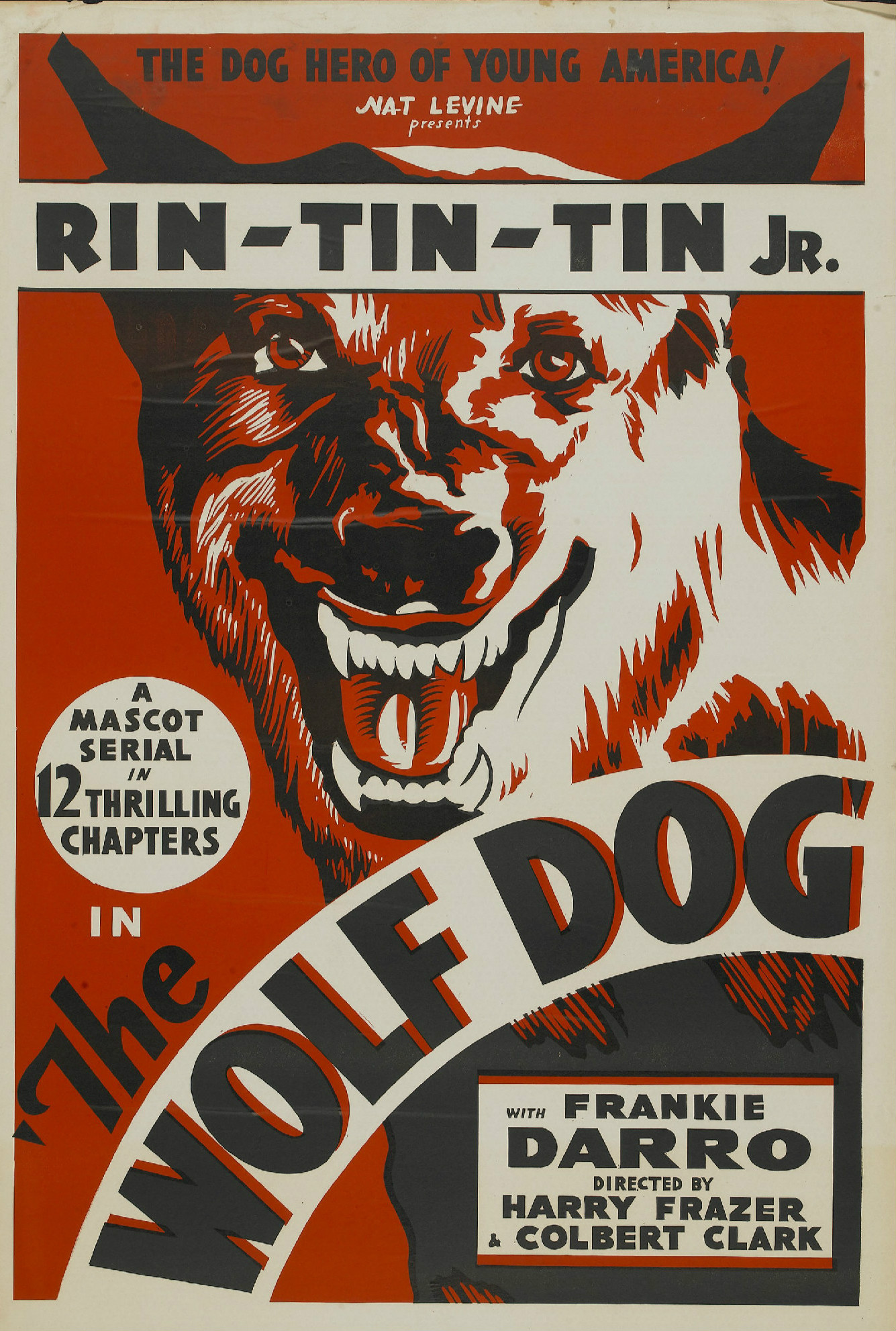
- Directed by: Colbert Clark; Harry L. Fraser
- Written by: Barney A. Sarecky; Sherman L. Lowe; Al Martin; Wyndham Gittens; Colbert Clark
- Produced by: Nat Levine
- Starring: Frankie Darro; Rin Tin Tin, Jr. Boots Mallory; George J. Lewis; Henry B. Walthall; Hale Hamilton
- Cinematography: Tom Galligan; Harry Neumann; William Nobles
- Edited by: Earl Turner
- Music by: Lee Zahler
- Distributed by: Mascot Pictures
- Release date: September 30, 1933
- Running time: 12 chapters (240 min)
- Country: United States
- Language: English

The Wolf Dog is a 1933 American Pre-Code Mascot film serial directed by Colbert Clark and Harry L. Fraser and starring Frankie Darro and Rin Tin Tin, Jr. The plot concerns a young boy becoming the heir to a fortune and a villain attempting to take it from him. The boy's canine pet, Rin Tin Tin Jr., is the star of the film, protecting his master from a succession of murder attempts.

This was Rin Tin Tin Jr.'s first serial outing, having replaced the original Rin Tin Tin who died in 1932. He also starred in two other serials, The Law of the Wild (1934) and The Adventures of Rex and Rinty (1935). The Wolf Dog was released on September 30, 1933.

== Plot ==
Youngster Frank Courtney discovers that he has inherited control of a Los Angeles shipping line. The current president, Norman Bryan, does not want to lose his position and conspires to have the boy killed. Rin Tin Tin Jr., the Wonder Dog, protects the boy from Bryan's murderous plots throughout the serial's running time.

== Cast ==
- Frankie Darro as Frank Courtney, heir to a shipping line
- Rin Tin Tin, Jr. as Pal, Frank's dog
- Boots Mallory as Irene Blane, who is really Frank's cousin Irene Courtney
- George J. Lewis as Bob Whitlock, radio operator
- Henry B. Walthall as Jim Courtney
- Hale Hamilton as Norman Bryan, villainous current president of the shipping line
- Fred Kohler as Joe Stevens
- Donald Reed as Swanson
- Gordon De Main as Murphy
- Tom London as Brooks
- Stanley Blystone as Lang
- Max Wagner as Dave Harmon
- Leon Holmes as Napoleon
- Sarah Padden as Mrs. Stevens
- Dickie Moore as Boy at Airport
- Carroll Nye as Radio Announcer
- Lew Meehan as Rancher
- Harry Tenbrook as Sailor (uncredited)

== Production ==
=== Stunts ===
- Yakima Canutt - the "Ram Rod" (stunt coordinator)
- George Magrill
- Kermit Maynard

== Chapter titles ==
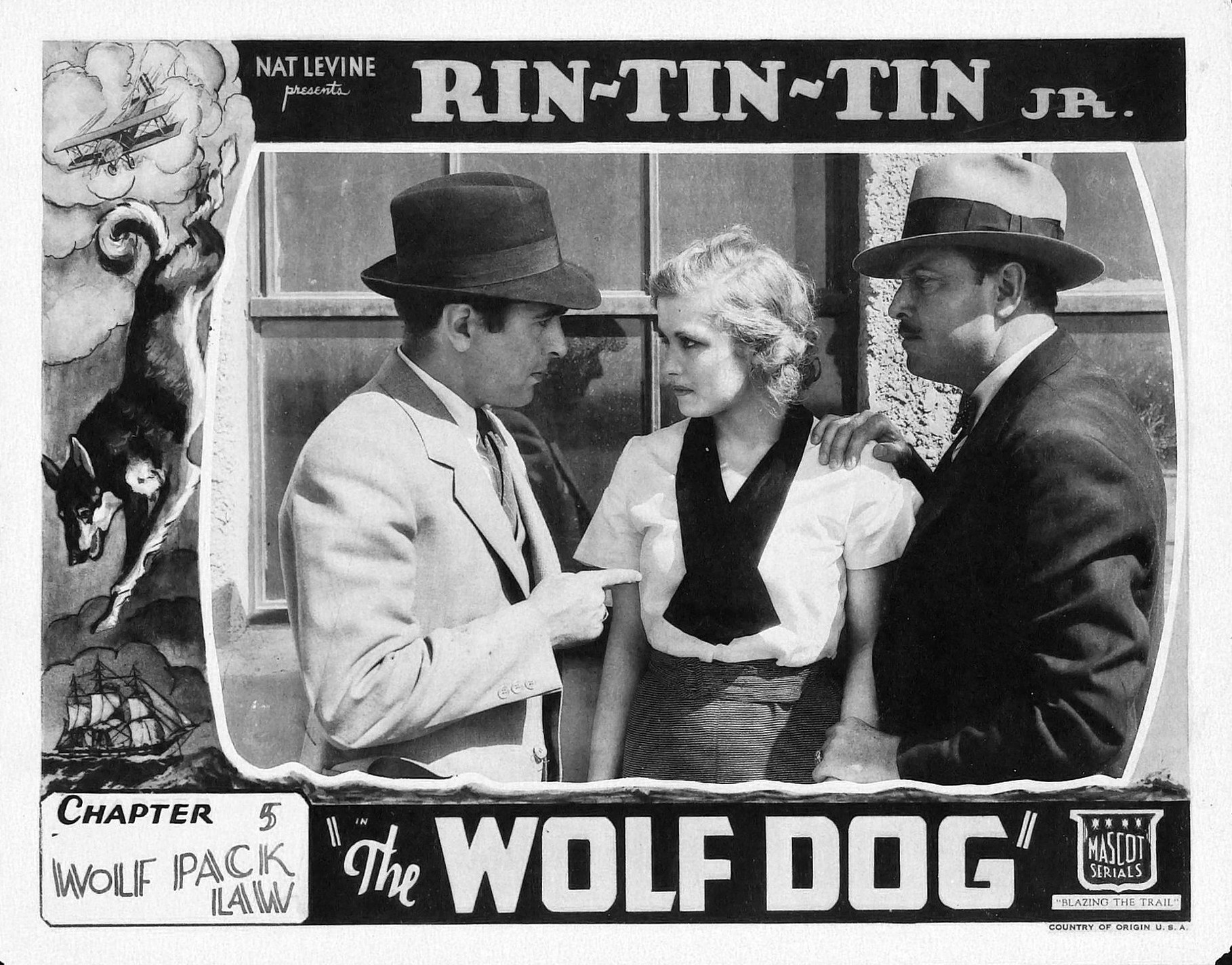
Lobby card for Chapter 5

1. The Call of the Wilderness
2. The Shadow of a Crime
3. The Fugitive
4. A Dead Man's Hand
5. Wolf Pack Law
6. The Gates of Mercy
7. The Empty Room
8. Avenging Fangs
9. Wizard of the Wireless
10. Accused
11. The Broken Record
12. Danger Lights

_{Source:}

== See also ==
- List of film serials
- List of film serials by studio

Preceded by Fighting with Kit Carson (1933)	Mascot Serial; The Wolf Dog (1933)	Succeeded by The Mystery Squadron (1933)
