= The Texan (1932 film) =

1932 film

- Directed by: Clifford S. Smith
- Produced by: Gene Marcus
- Starring: Jay Wilsey; Lucile Browne; Bobby Nelson
- Cinematography: Ross Fisher
- Edited by: Murray Seldeen
- Distributed by: Principal Attractions
- Release date: 1932 (US)
- Running time: 6 reels
- Country: United States
- Language: English

The Texan is a 1932 American Western film directed by Clifford S. Smith, starring Jay Wilsey, Lucile Browne, and Bobby Nelson.

== Cast ==
- Jay Wilsey (credited Buffalo Bill Jr.) as William Lloyd Rusk
- Lucile Browne as Mary Lou
- Bobby Nelson as Bobby
- Lafe McKee
- Jack Mower
- Art Mix
- Duke R. Lee
