= The Mystery Squadron =

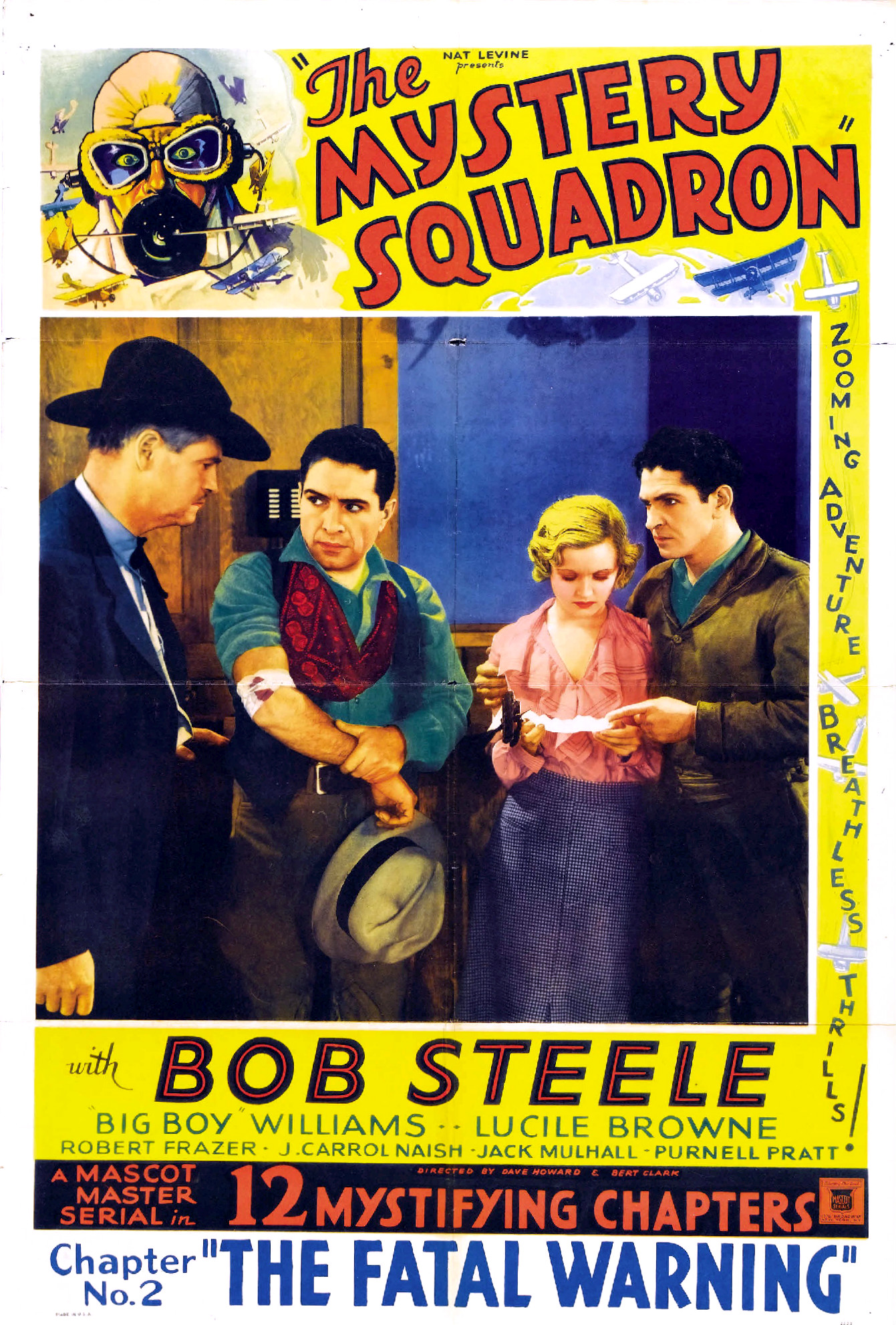
- Poster of chapter 2
- Directed by: Colbert Clark; David Howard
- Written by: Sherman L. Lowe; Al Martin; Barney A. Sarecky; Colbert Clark; David Howard; Wyndham Gittens
- Produced by: Nat Levine
- Starring: Bob Steele; Guinn "Big Boy" Williams; Lucile Browne; Jack Mulhall; Purnell Pratt
- Cinematography: Ernest Miller; William Nobles; Alvin Wyckoff
- Edited by: Wyndham Gittens; Earl Turner
- Music by: Lee Zahler
- Distributed by: Mascot Pictures
- Release date: December 22, 1933 (U.S.)
- Running time: 12 chapters (220 min)
- Country: United States
- Language: English

The Mystery Squadron (aka Mystery Squadron) is a 1933 American pre-Code 12-chapter Mascot film serial, directed by Colbert Clark and David Howard. The film was produced by Nat Levine, and stars Western star Bob Steele, Guinn "Big Boy" Williams, Lucile Browne, Purnell Pratt and Jack Mulhall. The Mystery Squadron made an impressive use of a great deal of aerial footage to enliven the action. (Note: Despite Mascot's relatively meagre budgets, by the 1930s, along with Universal Pictures, the lowly "poverty row" studio dominated serials.)

== Plot ==
At an air show, ace flyers Fred Cromwell (Bob Steele) and his partner, Bill "Jelly Bean" Cook (Guinn "Big Boy" Williams) perform aerial feats that prove they are the greatest aviators around. A dam being built by Stephen Gray (Lafe McKee), the owner of a construction firm, comes under attack from the mysterious pilot, the "Black Ace", and his "Mystery Squadron" of pilots. With Gray facing financial ruin, he asks Henry Davis (Jack Mulhall), the dam's foreman and ex-stunt pilot to hire Fred and Bill.

The identity of the Black Ace is so secret that it is even concealed from his own men in the Mystery Squadron. Fred and his partner, Bill seek to unmask the Black Ace and stop his attacks on Gray's power dam. The Mystery Squadron is headquartered in a secret cave near the dam.

A rich gold mine is threatened by the dam's construction and a number of individuals behave suspiciously, including Lafe Johnson (Purnell Pratt), a rival contractor, Martin (Edward Peil, Sr.), the hotel owner, Collins (J. Carrol Naish), a construction employee for Gray and Dr. Flint (Robert Frazer). When the Mystery Squadron strikes again, Fred finds Davis tied up in his car. Davis explains he has been held captive by the raiders.

Fred and Bill finally confront Davis with evidence that he is the Black Ace. Davis panics and takes off in his aircraft only to be shot down by Fred and his partner.

== Cast ==
- Bob Steele as Fred Cromwell, old stunt pilot friend of Henry Davis
- Guinn "Big Boy" Williams as Bill "Jellybean" Cook, old stunt pilot friend of Henry Davis
- Lucile Browne as Dorothy Gray
- Jack Mulhall as Henry Davis, dam foreman and ex-stunt pilot
- Purnell Pratt as Lafe Johnson
- Robert Frazer as Dr Flint
- J. Carrol Naish as Collins
- Edward Peil, Sr. as Martin
- Bob Kortman as Bracken
- Lafe McKee as Stephen Gray

== Production ==
Up to four Travel Air 2000s, commonly known as the "Wichita Fokker", a popular aircraft used in Hollywood features, were used in various aerial sequences. Most of the attacks by air, however, were shot with miniatures on diorama sets.

=== Stunts ===
- Yakima Canutt
- George Magrill

== Reception ==
Hans J. Wollstein in his review of The Mystery Squadron wrote, "... Mystery Squadron contains many well-made aerial fights and stunts but is also filled with all kinds of silly and seemingly unnecessary gaffes. When a dart carrying a warning note is thrown through a window, for example, that same window is shown in the following shot as not only securely closed but covered by an undamaged lace curtain." and ".. (Williams') supposedly comical craving for jellybeans quickly becomes tiring."

== Chapter Titles ==
1. The Black Ace
2. The Fatal Warning
3. The Black Ace Strikes
4. Men of Steel
5. The Death Swoop
6. Doomed
7. Enemy Signals
8. The Canyon of Calamity
9. The Secret of the Mine
10. Clipped Wings
11. The Beast at Bay
12. The Ace of Aces

_{Source:}

== See also ==
- Bob Steele filmography
- List of film serials by year
- List of film serials by studio

Preceded by The Wolf Dog (1933)	Mascot Serial; The Mystery Squadron (1933)	Succeeded by The Lost Jungle (1934)
