= Texas Terror (film) =

1935 film

- Theatrical poster
- Directed by: Robert N. Bradbury
- Produced by: Paul Malvern
- Starring: John Wayne; George "Gabby" Hayes
- Cinematography: William Hyer; Archie Stout (uncredited)
- Edited by: Carl Pierson
- Music by: Billy Barber
- Production companies: Lone Star Productions; Monogram Pictures Corporation
- Distributed by: Monogram Pictures Corporation
- Release date: February 1, 1935
- Running time: 51 minutes
- Country: United States
- Language: English

Texas Terror is a 1935 American Monogram romantic Western film directed by Robert N. Bradbury and starring John Wayne, George "Gabby" Hayes and Lucile Brown.

== Plot ==
Sheriff John Higgins (John Wayne) believes he accidentally killed his best friend Dan Matthews during a shootout with robbers. Overcome by guilt, he resigns his badge and becomes a prospector. Dan's daughter Bess (Lucile Browne) arrives from the East to run her late father's struggling ranch. Former sheriff Ed Williams (Gabby Hayes) convinces John to work as her foreman to atone quietly—without revealing his role in her father's death.

As John helps Bess manage the ranch and bonds with her, she hears rumors about the incident, straining their growing romance. Meanwhile, outlaws threaten the ranch with theft and violence.

Through action, confrontations, and alliances (including with local Native Americans), John uncovers the truth—Dan was killed by the bandits, not him. He defeats the gang, clears his name, wins Bess's forgiveness and love, and finds redemption.

== Cast ==
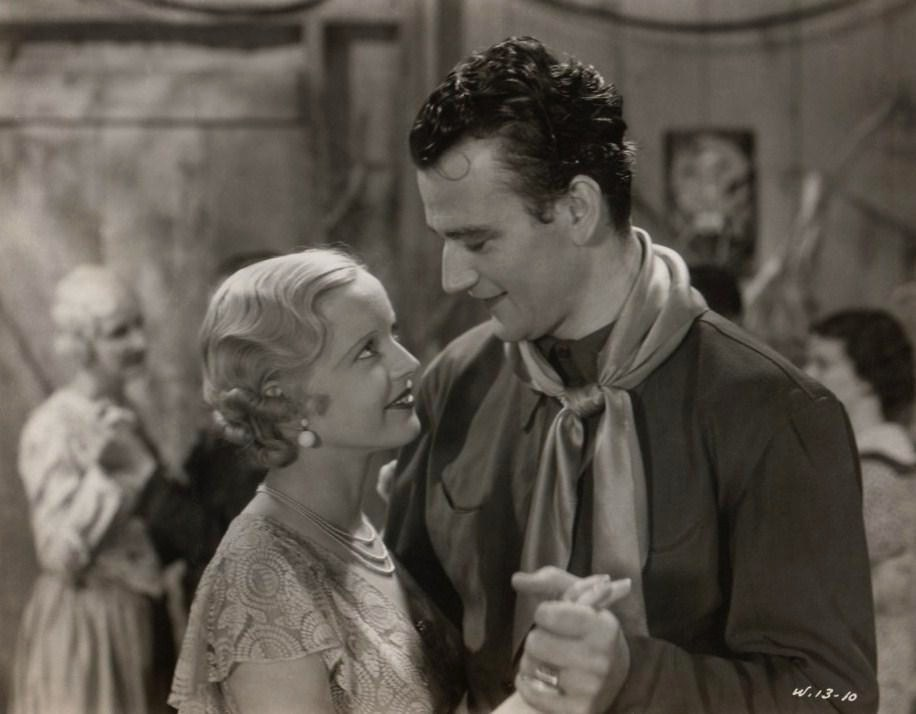
Lucile Browne and John Wayne in Texas Terror (cropped film still)

- John Wayne as John Higgins
- Lucile Browne as Bess Matthews (billed as Lucille Browne)
- LeRoy Mason as Joe Dickson (billed as Leroy Mason)
- Fern Emmett as Aunt Martha Hubbard
- George "Gabby" Hayes as Sheriff Ed Williams (billed as George Hayes)
- Jay Wilsey as Blackie Martin (billed as Buffalo Bill Jr.)
- John Ince as blacksmith Bob
- Henry Roquemore as dance MC (billed as Henry Roguemore)
- Jack Duffy as Jake Abernathy

== Reception ==
Texas Terror was released on February 1, 1935.

Reviewing the film as part of a collection, Stuart Galbraith called it part of a series of "substandard, ultra-cheap John Wayne pictures". Reviewing another collection, Ike Oden of DVD Verdict called it a "disposable footnote".

== See also ==
- John Wayne filmography
- List of American films of 1935
