= Methodology =

Study of research methods

In its most common sense, methodology is the study of research methods. However, the term can also refer to the methods themselves or to the philosophical discussion of associated background assumptions. A method is a structured procedure for bringing about a certain goal, like acquiring knowledge or verifying knowledge claims. This normally involves various steps, like choosing a sample, collecting data from this sample, and interpreting the data. The study of methods concerns a detailed description and analysis of these processes. It includes evaluative aspects by comparing different methods. This way, it is assessed what advantages and disadvantages they have and for what research goals they may be used. These descriptions and evaluations depend on philosophical background assumptions. Examples are how to conceptualize the studied phenomena and what constitutes evidence for or against them. When understood in the widest sense, methodology also includes the discussion of these more abstract issues.

Methodologies are traditionally divided into quantitative and qualitative research. Quantitative research is the main methodology of the natural sciences. It uses precise numerical measurements. Its goal is usually to find universal laws used to make predictions about future events. The dominant methodology in the natural sciences is called the scientific method. It includes steps like observation and the formulation of a hypothesis. Further steps are to test the hypothesis using an experiment, to compare the measurements to the expected results, and to publish the findings.

Qualitative research is more characteristic of the social sciences and gives less prominence to exact numerical measurements. It aims more at an in-depth understanding of the meaning of the studied phenomena and less at universal and predictive laws. Common methods found in the social sciences are surveys, interviews, focus groups, and the nominal group technique. They differ from each other concerning their sample size, the types of questions asked, and the general setting. In recent decades, many social scientists have started using mixed-methods research, which combines quantitative and qualitative methodologies.

Many discussions in methodology concern the question of whether the quantitative approach is superior, especially whether it is adequate when applied to the social domain. A few theorists reject methodology as a discipline in general. For example, some argue that it is useless since methods should be used rather than studied. Others hold that it is harmful because it restricts the freedom and creativity of researchers. Methodologists often respond to these objections by claiming that a good methodology helps researchers arrive at reliable theories in an efficient way. The choice of method often matters since the same factual material can lead to different conclusions depending on one's method. Interest in methodology has risen in the 20th century due to the increased importance of interdisciplinary work and the obstacles hindering efficient cooperation.

== Definitions ==
The term "methodology" is associated with a variety of meanings. In its most common usage, it refers either to a method, to the field of inquiry studying methods, or to philosophical discussions of background assumptions involved in these processes. Some researchers distinguish methods from methodologies by holding that methods are modes of data collection while methodologies are more general research strategies that determine how to conduct a research project. In this sense, methodologies include various theoretical commitments about the intended outcomes of the investigation.

=== As method ===
The term "methodology" is sometimes used as a synonym for the term "method". A method is a way of reaching some predefined goal. It is a planned and structured procedure for solving a theoretical or practical problem. In this regard, methods stand in contrast to free and unstructured approaches to problem-solving. For example, descriptive statistics is a method of data analysis, radiocarbon dating is a method of determining the age of organic objects, sautéing is a method of cooking, and project-based learning is an educational method. The term "technique" is often used as a synonym both in the academic and the everyday discourse. Methods usually involve a clearly defined series of decisions and actions to be used under certain circumstances, usually expressable as a sequence of repeatable instructions. The goal of following the steps of a method is to bring about the result promised by it. In the context of inquiry, methods may be defined as systems of rules and procedures to discover regularities of nature, society, and thought. In this sense, methodology can refer to procedures used to arrive at new knowledge or to techniques of verifying and falsifying pre-existing knowledge claims. This encompasses various issues pertaining both to the collection of data and their analysis. Concerning the collection, it involves the problem of sampling and of how to go about the data collection itself, like surveys, interviews, or observation. There are also numerous methods of how the collected data can be analyzed using statistics or other ways of interpreting it to extract interesting conclusions.

=== As study of methods ===
However, many theorists emphasize the differences between the terms "method" and "methodology". In this regard, methodology may be defined as "the study or description of methods" or as "the analysis of the principles of methods, rules, and postulates employed by a discipline". This study or analysis involves uncovering assumptions and practices associated with the different methods and a detailed description of research designs and hypothesis testing. It also includes evaluative aspects: forms of data collection, measurement strategies, and ways to analyze data are compared and their advantages and disadvantages relative to different research goals and situations are assessed. In this regard, methodology provides the skills, knowledge, and practical guidance needed to conduct scientific research in an efficient manner. It acts as a guideline for various decisions researchers need to take in the scientific process.

Methodology can be understood as the middle ground between concrete particular methods and the abstract and general issues discussed by the philosophy of science. In this regard, methodology comes after formulating a research question and helps the researchers decide what methods to use in the process. For example, methodology should assist the researcher in deciding why one method of sampling is preferable to another in a particular case or which form of data analysis is likely to bring the best results. Methodology achieves this by explaining, evaluating and justifying methods. Just as there are different methods, there are also different methodologies. Different methodologies provide different approaches to how methods are evaluated and explained and may thus make different suggestions on what method to use in a particular case.

According to Alexander Spirkin, "[a] methodology is a system of principles and general ways of organising and structuring theoretical and practical activity, and also the theory of this system". Helen Kara defines methodology as "a contextual framework for research, a coherent and logical scheme based on views, beliefs, and values, that guides the choices researchers make". Ginny E. Garcia and Dudley L. Poston understand methodology either as a complex body of rules and postulates guiding research or as the analysis of such rules and procedures. As a body of rules and postulates, a methodology defines the subject of analysis as well as the conceptual tools used by the analysis and the limits of the analysis. Research projects are usually governed by a structured procedure known as the research process. The goal of this process is given by a research question, which determines what kind of information one intends to acquire.

=== As discussion of background assumptions ===
Some theorists prefer an even wider understanding of methodology that involves not just the description, comparison, and evaluation of methods but includes additionally more general philosophical issues. One reason for this wider approach is that discussions of when to use which method often take various background assumptions for granted, for example, concerning the goal and nature of research. These assumptions can at times play an important role concerning which method to choose and how to follow it. For example, Thomas Kuhn argues in his The Structure of Scientific Revolutions that sciences operate within a framework or a paradigm that determines which questions are asked and what counts as good science. This concerns philosophical disagreements both about how to conceptualize the phenomena studied, what constitutes evidence for and against them, and what the general goal of researching them is. So in this wider sense, methodology overlaps with philosophy by making these assumptions explicit and presenting arguments for and against them. According to C. S. Herrman, a good methodology clarifies the structure of the data to be analyzed and helps the researchers see the phenomena in a new light. In this regard, a methodology is similar to a paradigm. A similar view is defended by Spirkin, who holds that a central aspect of every methodology is the world view that comes with it.

The discussion of background assumptions can include metaphysical and ontological issues in cases where they have important implications for the proper research methodology. For example, a realist perspective considering the observed phenomena as an external and independent reality is often associated with an emphasis on empirical data collection and a more distanced and objective attitude. Idealists, on the other hand, hold that external reality is not fully independent of the mind and tend, therefore, to include more subjective tendencies in the research process as well.

For the quantitative approach, philosophical debates in methodology include the distinction between the inductive and the hypothetico-deductive interpretation of the scientific method. For qualitative research, many basic assumptions are tied to philosophical positions such as hermeneutics, pragmatism, Marxism, critical theory, and postmodernism. According to Kuhn, an important factor in such debates is that the different paradigms are incommensurable. This means that there is no overarching framework to assess the conflicting theoretical and methodological assumptions. This critique puts into question various presumptions of the quantitative approach associated with scientific progress based on the steady accumulation of data.

Other discussions of abstract theoretical issues in the philosophy of science are also sometimes included. This can involve questions like how and whether scientific research differs from fictional writing as well as whether research studies objective facts rather than constructing the phenomena it claims to study. In the latter sense, some methodologists have even claimed that the goal of science is less to represent a pre-existing reality and more to bring about some kind of social change in favor of repressed groups in society.

=== Related terms and issues ===
Viknesh Andiappan and Yoke Kin Wan use the field of process systems engineering to distinguish the term "methodology" from the closely related terms "approach", "method", "procedure", and "technique". On their view, "approach" is the most general term. It can be defined as "a way or direction used to address a problem based on a set of assumptions". An example is the difference between hierarchical approaches, which consider one task at a time in a hierarchical manner, and concurrent approaches, which consider them all simultaneously. Methodologies are a little more specific. They are general strategies needed to realize an approach and may be understood as guidelines for how to make choices. Often the term "framework" is used as a synonym. A method is a still more specific way of practically implementing the approach. Methodologies provide the guidelines that help researchers decide which method to follow. The method itself may be understood as a sequence of techniques. A technique is a step taken that can be observed and measured. Each technique has some immediate result. The whole sequence of steps is termed a "procedure". A similar but less complex characterization is sometimes found in the field of language teaching, where the teaching process may be described through a three-level conceptualization based on "approach", "method", and "technique".

One question concerning the definition of methodology is whether it should be understood as a descriptive or a normative discipline. The key difference in this regard is whether methodology just provides a value-neutral description of methods or what scientists actually do. Many methodologists practice their craft in a normative sense, meaning that they express clear opinions about the advantages and disadvantages of different methods. In this regard, methodology is not just about what researchers actually do but about what they ought to do or how to perform good research.

== Types ==
Theorists often distinguish various general types or approaches to methodology. The most influential classification contrasts quantitative and qualitative methodology.

=== Quantitative and qualitative ===
Quantitative research is closely associated with the natural sciences. It is based on precise numerical measurements, which are then used to arrive at exact general laws. This precision is also reflected in the goal of making predictions that can later be verified by other researchers. Examples of quantitative research include physicists at the Large Hadron Collider measuring the mass of newly created particles and positive psychologists conducting an online survey to determine the correlation between income and self-assessed well-being.

Qualitative research is characterized in various ways in the academic literature but there are very few precise definitions of the term. It is often used in contrast to quantitative research for forms of study that do not quantify their subject matter numerically. However, the distinction between these two types is not always obvious and various theorists have argued that it should be understood as a continuum and not as a dichotomy. A lot of qualitative research is concerned with some form of human experience or behavior, in which case it tends to focus on a few individuals and their in-depth understanding of the meaning of the studied phenomena. Examples of the qualitative method are a market researcher conducting a focus group in order to learn how people react to a new product or a medical researcher performing an unstructured in-depth interview with a participant from a new experimental therapy to assess its potential benefits and drawbacks. It is also used to improve quantitative research, such as informing data collection materials and questionnaire design. Qualitative research is frequently employed in fields where the pre-existing knowledge is inadequate. This way, it is possible to get a first impression of the field and potential theories, thus paving the way for investigating the issue in further studies.

Quantitative methods dominate in the natural sciences but both methodologies are used in the social sciences. Some social scientists focus mostly on one method while others try to investigate the same phenomenon using a variety of different methods. It is central to both approaches how the group of individuals used for the data collection is selected. This process is known as sampling. It involves the selection of a subset of individuals or phenomena to be measured. Important in this regard is that the selected samples are representative of the whole population, i.e. that no significant biases were involved when choosing. If this is not the case, the data collected does not reflect what the population as a whole is like. This affects generalizations and predictions drawn from the biased data. The number of individuals selected is called the sample size. For qualitative research, the sample size is usually rather small, while quantitative research tends to focus on big groups and collecting a lot of data. After the collection, the data needs to be analyzed and interpreted to arrive at interesting conclusions that pertain directly to the research question. This way, the wealth of information obtained is summarized and thus made more accessible to others. Especially in the case of quantitative research, this often involves the application of some form of statistics to make sense of the numerous individual measurements.

Many discussions in the history of methodology center around the quantitative methods used by the natural sciences. A central question in this regard is to what extent they can be applied to other fields, like the social sciences and history. The success of the natural sciences was often seen as an indication of the superiority of the quantitative methodology and used as an argument to apply this approach to other fields as well. However, this outlook has been put into question in the more recent methodological discourse. In this regard, it is often argued that the paradigm of the natural sciences is a one-sided development of reason, which is not equally well suited to all areas of inquiry. The divide between quantitative and qualitative methods in the social sciences is one consequence of this criticism.

Which method is more appropriate often depends on the goal of the research. For example, quantitative methods usually excel for evaluating preconceived hypotheses that can be clearly formulated and measured. Qualitative methods, on the other hand, can be used to study complex individual issues, often with the goal of formulating new hypotheses. This is especially relevant when the existing knowledge of the subject is inadequate. Important advantages of quantitative methods include precision and reliability. However, they have often difficulties in studying very complex phenomena that are commonly of interest to the social sciences. Additional problems can arise when the data is misinterpreted to defend conclusions that are not directly supported by the measurements themselves. In recent decades, many researchers in the social sciences have started combining both methodologies. This is known as mixed-methods research. A central motivation for this is that the two approaches can complement each other in various ways: some issues are ignored or too difficult to study with one methodology and are better approached with the other. In other cases, both approaches are applied to the same issue to produce more comprehensive and well-rounded results.

Qualitative and quantitative research are often associated with different research paradigms and background assumptions. Qualitative researchers often use an interpretive or critical approach while quantitative researchers tend to prefer a positivistic approach. Important disagreements between these approaches concern the role of objectivity and hard empirical data as well as the research goal of predictive success rather than in-depth understanding or social change.

=== Others ===
Various other classifications have been proposed. One distinguishes between substantive and formal methodologies. Substantive methodologies tend to focus on one specific area of inquiry. The findings are initially restricted to this specific field but may be transferrable to other areas of inquiry. Formal methodologies, on the other hand, are based on a variety of studies and try to arrive at more general principles applying to different fields. They may also give particular prominence to the analysis of the language of science and the formal structure of scientific explanation. A closely related classification distinguishes between philosophical, general scientific, and special scientific methods.

One type of methodological outlook is called "proceduralism". According to it, the goal of methodology is to boil down the research process to a simple set of rules or a recipe that automatically leads to good research if followed precisely. However, it has been argued that, while this ideal may be acceptable for some forms of quantitative research, it fails for qualitative research. One argument for this position is based on the claim that research is not a technique but a craft that cannot be achieved by blindly following a method. In this regard, research depends on forms of creativity and improvisation to amount to good science.

Other types include inductive, deductive, and transcendental methods. Inductive methods are common in the empirical sciences and proceed through inductive reasoning from many particular observations to arrive at general conclusions, often in the form of universal laws. Deductive methods, also referred to as axiomatic methods, are often found in formal sciences, such as geometry. They start from a set of self-evident axioms or first principles and use deduction to infer interesting conclusions from these axioms. Transcendental methods are common in Kantian and post-Kantian philosophy. They start with certain particular observations. It is then argued that the observed phenomena can only exist if their conditions of possibility are fulfilled. This way, the researcher may draw general psychological or metaphysical conclusions based on the claim that the phenomenon would not be observable otherwise.

== Importance ==
It has been argued that a proper understanding of methodology is important for various issues in the field of research. They include both the problem of conducting efficient and reliable research as well as being able to validate knowledge claims by others. Method is often seen as one of the main factors of scientific progress. This is especially true for the natural sciences where the developments of experimental methods in the 16th and 17th century are often seen as the driving force behind the success and prominence of the natural sciences. In some cases, the choice of methodology may have a severe impact on a research project. The reason is that very different and sometimes even opposite conclusions may follow from the same factual material based on the chosen methodology.

Aleksandr Georgievich Spirkin argues that methodology, when understood in a wide sense, is of great importance since the world presents us with innumerable entities and relations between them. Methods are needed to simplify this complexity and find a way of mastering it. On the theoretical side, this concerns ways of forming true beliefs and solving problems. On the practical side, this concerns skills of influencing nature and dealing with each other. These different methods are usually passed down from one generation to the next. Spirkin holds that the interest in methodology on a more abstract level arose in attempts to formalize these techniques to improve them as well as to make it easier to use them and pass them on. In the field of research, for example, the goal of this process is to find reliable means to acquire knowledge in contrast to mere opinions acquired by unreliable means. In this regard, "methodology is a way of obtaining and building up ... knowledge".

Various theorists have observed that the interest in methodology has risen significantly in the 20th century. This increased interest is reflected not just in academic publications on the subject but also in the institutionalized establishment of training programs focusing specifically on methodology. This phenomenon can be interpreted in different ways. Some see it as a positive indication of the topic's theoretical and practical importance. Others interpret this interest in methodology as an excessive preoccupation that draws time and energy away from doing research on concrete subjects by applying the methods instead of researching them. This ambiguous attitude towards methodology is sometimes even exemplified in the same person. Max Weber, for example, criticized the focus on methodology during his time while making significant contributions to it himself. Spirkin believes that one important reason for this development is that contemporary society faces many global problems. These problems cannot be solved by a single researcher or a single discipline but are in need of collaborative efforts from many fields. Such interdisciplinary undertakings profit a lot from methodological advances, both concerning the ability to understand the methods of the respective fields and in relation to developing more homogeneous methods equally used by all of them.

== Criticism ==
Most criticism of methodology is directed at one specific form or understanding of it. In such cases, one particular methodological theory is rejected but not methodology at large when understood as a field of research comprising many different theories. In this regard, many objections to methodology focus on the quantitative approach, specifically when it is treated as the only viable approach. Nonetheless, there are also more fundamental criticisms of methodology in general. They are often based on the idea that there is little value to abstract discussions of methods and the reasons cited for and against them. In this regard, it may be argued that what matters is the correct employment of methods and not their meticulous study. Sigmund Freud, for example, compared methodologists to "people who clean their glasses so thoroughly that they never have time to look through them". According to C. Wright Mills, the practice of methodology often degenerates into a "fetishism of method and technique".

Some even hold that methodological reflection is not just a waste of time but actually has negative side effects. Such an argument may be defended by analogy to other skills that work best when the agent focuses only on employing them. In this regard, reflection may interfere with the process and lead to avoidable mistakes. According to an example by Gilbert Ryle, "[w]e run, as a rule, worse, not better, if we think a lot about our feet". A less severe version of this criticism does not reject methodology per se but denies its importance and rejects an intense focus on it. In this regard, methodology has still a limited and subordinate utility but becomes a diversion or even counterproductive by hindering practice when given too much emphasis.

Another line of criticism concerns more the general and abstract nature of methodology. It states that the discussion of methods is only useful in concrete and particular cases but not concerning abstract guidelines governing many or all cases. Some anti-methodologists reject methodology based on the claim that researchers need freedom to do their work effectively. But this freedom may be constrained and stifled by "inflexible and inappropriate guidelines". For example, according to Kerry Chamberlain, a good interpretation needs creativity to be provocative and insightful, which is prohibited by a strictly codified approach. Chamberlain uses the neologism "methodolatry" to refer to this alleged overemphasis on methodology. Similar arguments are given in Paul Feyerabend's book Against Method.

However, these criticisms of methodology in general are not always accepted. Many methodologists defend their craft by pointing out how the efficiency and reliability of research can be improved through a proper understanding of methodology.

A criticism of more specific forms of methodology is found in the works of the sociologist Howard S. Becker. He is quite critical of methodologists based on the claim that they usually act as advocates of one particular method usually associated with quantitative research. An often-cited quotation in this regard is that "[m]ethodology is too important to be left to methodologists". Alan Bryman has rejected this negative outlook on methodology. He holds that Becker's criticism can be avoided by understanding methodology as an inclusive inquiry into all kinds of methods and not as a mere doctrine for converting non-believers to one's preferred method.

== In different fields ==
Part of the importance of methodology is reflected in the number of fields to which it is relevant. They include the natural sciences and the social sciences as well as philosophy and mathematics.

=== Natural sciences ===
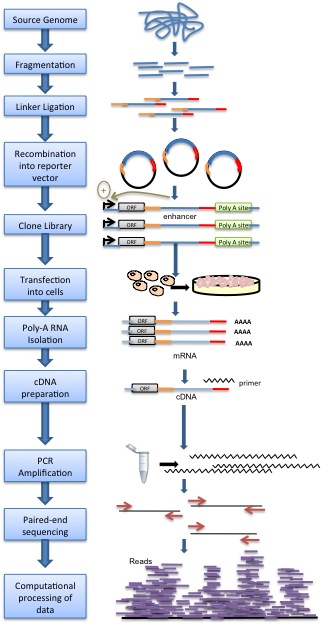
The methodology underlying a type of DNA sequencing

The dominant methodology in the natural sciences (like astronomy, biology, chemistry, geoscience, and physics) is called the scientific method. Its main cognitive aim is usually seen as the creation of knowledge, but various closely related aims have also been proposed, like understanding, explanation, or predictive success. Strictly speaking, there is no one single scientific method. In this regard, the expression "scientific method" refers not to one specific procedure but to different general or abstract methodological aspects characteristic of all the aforementioned fields. Important features are that the problem is formulated in a clear manner and that the evidence presented for or against a theory is public, reliable, and replicable. The last point is important so that other researchers are able to repeat the experiments to confirm or disconfirm the initial study. For this reason, various factors and variables of the situation often have to be controlled to avoid distorting influences and to ensure that subsequent measurements by other researchers yield the same results. The scientific method is a quantitative approach that aims at obtaining numerical data. This data is often described using mathematical formulas. The goal is usually to arrive at some universal generalizations that apply not just to the artificial situation of the experiment but to the world at large. Some data can only be acquired using advanced measurement instruments. In cases where the data is very complex, it is often necessary to employ sophisticated statistical techniques to draw conclusions from it.

The scientific method is often broken down into several steps. In a typical case, the procedure starts with regular observation and the collection of information. These findings then lead the scientist to formulate a hypothesis describing and explaining the observed phenomena. The next step consists in conducting an experiment designed for this specific hypothesis. The actual results of the experiment are then compared to the expected results based on one's hypothesis. The findings may then be interpreted and published, either as a confirmation or disconfirmation of the initial hypothesis.

Two central aspects of the scientific method are observation and experimentation. This distinction is based on the idea that experimentation involves some form of manipulation or intervention. This way, the studied phenomena are actively created or shaped. For example, a biologist inserting viral DNA into a bacterium is engaged in a form of experimentation. Pure observation, on the other hand, involves studying independent entities in a passive manner. This is the case, for example, when astronomers observe the orbits of astronomical objects far away. Observation played the main role in ancient science. The scientific revolution in the 16th and 17th century affected a paradigm change that gave a much more central role to experimentation in the scientific methodology. This is sometimes expressed by stating that modern science actively "puts questions to nature". While the distinction is usually clear in the paradigmatic cases, there are also many intermediate cases where it is not obvious whether they should be characterized as observation or as experimentation.

A central discussion in this field concerns the distinction between the inductive and the hypothetico-deductive methodology. The core disagreement between these two approaches concerns their understanding of the confirmation of scientific theories. The inductive approach holds that a theory is confirmed or supported by all its positive instances, i.e. by all the observations that exemplify it. For example, the observations of many white swans confirm the universal hypothesis that "all swans are white". The hypothetico-deductive approach, on the other hand, focuses not on positive instances but on deductive consequences of the theory. This way, the researcher uses deduction before conducting an experiment to infer what observations they expect. These expectations are then compared to the observations they actually make. This approach often takes a negative form based on falsification. In this regard, positive instances do not confirm a hypothesis but negative instances disconfirm it. Positive indications that the hypothesis is true are only given indirectly if many attempts to find counterexamples have failed. A cornerstone of this approach is the null hypothesis, which assumes that there is no connection (see causality) between whatever is being observed. It is up to the researcher to do all they can to disprove their own hypothesis through relevant methods or techniques, documented in a clear and replicable process. If they fail to do so, it can be concluded that the null hypothesis is false, which provides support for their own hypothesis about the relation between the observed phenomena.

=== Social sciences ===
Significantly more methodological variety is found in the social sciences, where both quantitative and qualitative approaches are used. They employ various forms of data collection, such as surveys, interviews, focus groups, and the nominal group technique. Surveys belong to quantitative research and usually involve some form of questionnaire given to a large group of individuals. It is paramount that the questions are easily understandable by the participants since the answers might not have much value otherwise. Surveys normally restrict themselves to closed questions in order to avoid various problems that come with the interpretation of answers to open questions. They contrast in this regard to interviews, which put more emphasis on the individual participant and often involve open questions. Structured interviews are planned in advance and have a fixed set of questions given to each individual. They contrast with unstructured interviews, which are closer to a free-flow conversation and require more improvisation on the side of the interviewer for finding interesting and relevant questions. Semi-structured interviews constitute a middle ground: they include both predetermined questions and questions not planned in advance. Structured interviews make it easier to compare the responses of the different participants and to draw general conclusions. However, they also limit what may be discovered and thus constrain the investigation in many ways. Depending on the type and depth of the interview, this method belongs either to quantitative or to qualitative research. The terms research conversation and muddy interview have been used to describe interviews conducted in informal settings which may not occur purely for the purposes of data collection. Some researcher employ the go-along method by conducting interviews while they and the participants navigate through and engage with their environment.

Focus groups are a qualitative research method often used in market research. They constitute a form of group interview involving a small number of demographically similar people. Researchers can use this method to collect data based on the interactions and responses of the participants. The interview often starts by asking the participants about their opinions on the topic under investigation, which may, in turn, lead to a free exchange in which the group members express and discuss their personal views. An important advantage of focus groups is that they can provide insight into how ideas and understanding operate in a cultural context. However, it is usually difficult to use these insights to discern more general patterns true for a wider public. One advantage of focus groups is that they can help the researcher identify a wide range of distinct perspectives on the issue in a short time. The group interaction may also help clarify and expand interesting contributions. One disadvantage is due to the moderator's personality and group effects, which may influence the opinions stated by the participants. When applied to cross-cultural settings, cultural and linguistic adaptations and group composition considerations are important to encourage greater participation in the group discussion.

The nominal group technique is similar to focus groups with a few important differences. The group often consists of experts in the field in question. The group size is similar but the interaction between the participants is more structured. The goal is to determine how much agreement there is among the experts on the different issues. The initial responses are often given in written form by each participant without a prior conversation between them. In this manner, group effects potentially influencing the expressed opinions are minimized. In later steps, the different responses and comments may be discussed and compared to each other by the group as a whole.

Most of these forms of data collection involve some type of observation. Observation can take place either in a natural setting, i.e. the field, or in a controlled setting such as a laboratory. Controlled settings carry with them the risk of distorting the results due to their artificiality. Their advantage lies in precisely controlling the relevant factors, which can help make the observations more reliable and repeatable. Non-participatory observation involves a distanced or external approach. In this case, the researcher focuses on describing and recording the observed phenomena without causing or changing them, in contrast to participatory observation.

An important methodological debate in the field of social sciences concerns the question of whether they deal with hard, objective, and value-neutral facts, as the natural sciences do. Positivists agree with this characterization, in contrast to interpretive and critical perspectives on the social sciences. According to William Neumann, positivism can be defined as "an organized method for combining deductive logic with precise empirical observations of individual behavior in order to discover and confirm a set of probabilistic causal laws that can be used to predict general patterns of human activity". This view is rejected by interpretivists. Max Weber, for example, argues that the method of the natural sciences is inadequate for the social sciences. Instead, more importance is placed on meaning and how people create and maintain their social worlds. The critical methodology in social science is associated with Karl Marx and Sigmund Freud. It is based on the assumption that many of the phenomena studied using the other approaches are mere distortions or surface illusions. It seeks to uncover deeper structures of the material world hidden behind these distortions. This approach is often guided by the goal of helping people effect social changes and improvements.

=== Philosophy ===
Philosophical methodology is the metaphilosophical field of inquiry studying the methods used in philosophy. These methods structure how philosophers conduct their research, acquire knowledge, and select between competing theories. It concerns both descriptive issues of what methods have been used by philosophers in the past and normative issues of which methods should be used. Many philosophers emphasize that these methods differ significantly from the methods found in the natural sciences in that they usually do not rely on experimental data obtained through measuring equipment. Which method one follows can have wide implications for how philosophical theories are constructed, what theses are defended, and what arguments are cited in favor or against. In this regard, many philosophical disagreements have their source in methodological disagreements. Historically, the discovery of new methods, like methodological skepticism and the phenomenological method, has had important impacts on the philosophical discourse.

A great variety of methods has been employed throughout the history of philosophy:

- Methodological skepticism gives special importance to the role of systematic doubt. This way, philosophers try to discover absolutely certain first principles that are indubitable.
- The geometric method starts from such first principles and employs deductive reasoning to construct a comprehensive philosophical system based on them.
- Phenomenology gives particular importance to how things appear to be. It consists in suspending one's judgments about whether these things actually exist in the external world. This technique is known as epoché and can be used to study appearances independent of assumptions about their causes.
- The method of conceptual analysis came to particular prominence with the advent of analytic philosophy. It studies concepts by breaking them down into their most fundamental constituents to clarify their meaning.
- Common sense philosophy uses common and widely accepted beliefs as a philosophical tool. They are used to draw interesting conclusions. This is often employed in a negative sense to discredit radical philosophical positions that go against common sense.
- Ordinary language philosophy has a very similar method: it approaches philosophical questions by looking at how the corresponding terms are used in ordinary language.
- Many methods in philosophy rely on some form of intuition. They are used, for example, to evaluate thought experiments, which involve imagining situations to assess their possible consequences in order to confirm or refute philosophical theories.
- The method of reflective equilibrium tries to form a coherent perspective by examining and reevaluating all the relevant beliefs and intuitions.
- Pragmatists focus on the practical consequences of philosophical theories to assess whether they are true or false.
- Experimental philosophy is a recently developed approach that uses the methodology of social psychology and the cognitive sciences for gathering empirical evidence and justifying philosophical claims.

=== Mathematics ===
In the field of mathematics, various methods can be distinguished, such as synthetic, analytic, deductive, inductive, and heuristic methods. For example, the difference between synthetic and analytic methods is that the former start from the known and proceed to the unknown while the latter seek to find a path from the unknown to the known. Geometry textbooks often proceed using the synthetic method. They start by listing known definitions and axioms and proceed by taking inferential steps, one at a time, until the solution to the initial problem is found. An important advantage of the synthetic method is its clear and short logical exposition. One disadvantage is that it is usually not obvious in the beginning that the steps taken lead to the intended conclusion. This may then come as a surprise to the reader since it is not explained how the mathematician knew in the beginning which steps to take. The analytic method often reflects better how mathematicians actually make their discoveries. For this reason, it is often seen as the better method for teaching mathematics. It starts with the intended conclusion and tries to find another formula from which it can be deduced. It then goes on to apply the same process to this new formula until it has traced back all the way to already proven theorems. The difference between the two methods concerns primarily how mathematicians think and present their proofs. The two are equivalent in the sense that the same proof may be presented either way.

=== Statistics ===
Statistics investigates the analysis, interpretation, and presentation of data. It plays a central role in many forms of quantitative research that have to deal with the data of many observations and measurements. In such cases, data analysis is used to cleanse, transform, and model the data to arrive at practically useful conclusions. There are numerous methods of data analysis. They are usually divided into descriptive statistics and inferential statistics. Descriptive statistics restricts itself to the data at hand. It tries to summarize the most salient features and present them in insightful ways. This can happen, for example, by visualizing its distribution or by calculating indices such as the mean or the standard deviation. Inferential statistics, on the other hand, uses this data based on a sample to draw inferences about the population at large. That can take the form of making generalizations and predictions or by assessing the probability of a concrete hypothesis.

=== Pedagogy ===
Pedagogy can be defined as the study or science of teaching methods. In this regard, it is the methodology of education: it investigates the methods and practices that can be applied to fulfill the aims of education. These aims include the transmission of knowledge as well as fostering skills and character traits. Its main focus is on teaching methods in the context of regular schools. But in its widest sense, it encompasses all forms of education, both inside and outside schools. In this wide sense, pedagogy is concerned with "any conscious activity by one person designed to enhance learning in another". The teaching happening this way is a process taking place between two parties: teachers and learners. Pedagogy investigates how the teacher can help the learner undergo experiences that promote their understanding of the subject matter in question.

Various influential pedagogical theories have been proposed. Mental-discipline theories were already common in ancient Greek and state that the main goal of teaching is to train intellectual capacities. They are usually based on a certain ideal of the capacities, attitudes, and values possessed by educated people. According to naturalistic theories, there is an inborn natural tendency in children to develop in a certain way. For them, pedagogy is about how to help this process happen by ensuring that the required external conditions are set up. Herbartianism identifies five essential components of teaching: preparation, presentation, association, generalization, and application. They correspond to different phases of the educational process: getting ready for it, showing new ideas, bringing these ideas in relation to known ideas, understanding the general principle behind their instances, and putting what one has learned into practice. Learning theories focus primarily on how learning takes place and formulate the proper methods of teaching based on these insights. One of them is apperception or association theory, which understands the mind primarily in terms of associations between ideas and experiences. On this view, the mind is initially a blank slate. Learning is a form of developing the mind by helping it establish the right associations. Behaviorism is a more externally oriented learning theory. It identifies learning with classical conditioning, in which the learner's behavior is shaped by presenting them with a stimulus with the goal of evoking and solidifying the desired response pattern to this stimulus.

The choice of which specific method is best to use depends on various factors, such as the subject matter and the learner's age. Interest and curiosity on the side of the student are among the key factors of learning success. This means that one important aspect of the chosen teaching method is to ensure that these motivational forces are maintained, through intrinsic or extrinsic motivation. Many forms of education also include regular assessment of the learner's progress, for example, in the form of tests. This helps to ensure that the teaching process is successful and to make adjustments to the chosen method if necessary.

=== Medical sciences ===
Medical research methodology applies the general principles of scientific inquiry to the study of human health and disease. Its primary objective is to generate reliable evidence for the prevention, diagnosis, treatment, and prognosis of diseases while ensuring patient safety and ethical integrity.

Contemporary medical research is largely guided by the principles of evidence-based medicine (EBM), which integrates the best available scientific evidence with clinical expertise and patient values.

Medical methodology encompasses a wide range of research designs. Observational studies, including cross-sectional, case-control, and cohort studies, are commonly used to investigate disease prevalence, risk factors, and prognosis, whereas experimental studies, particularly randomized controlled trials (RCTs), are regarded as the reference standard for evaluating therapeutic interventions because they minimize bias through randomization, allocation concealment, and blinding when appropriate.

Systematic reviews and meta-analyses synthesize evidence from multiple studies and occupy the highest level in most evidence hierarchies.

Methodological rigor in medical research requires careful study planning, including clearly defined eligibility criteria, appropriate sample size estimation, standardized outcome measures, prespecified statistical analyses, and measures to minimize systematic errors (bias) and confounding. Increasing emphasis is also placed on reproducibility, transparency of analytical procedures, and open reporting of research methods.

To improve the quality and transparency of biomedical research, several internationally accepted reporting guidelines have been developed. These include CONSORT for randomized clinical trials, STROBE for observational studies, PRISMA for systematic reviews and meta-analyses, STARD for diagnostic accuracy studies, and CARE for clinical case reports.

Together with the principles of Good Clinical Practice (ICH-GCP), these standards promote methodological consistency, facilitate critical appraisal, and improve reproducibility across research centers. The growing importance of reproducibility has also influenced neurophysiological and biomedical engineering research. Recent methodological studies have emphasized standardized signal acquisition, transparent preprocessing pipelines, deterministic analytical procedures, and comprehensive reporting of methods to facilitate replication and comparison of results across laboratories. Such approaches are increasingly regarded as essential for the clinical translation of electrophysiological biomarkers.

Beyond study design, contemporary medical methodology emphasizes the critical appraisal of evidence. Systems such as GRADE (Grading of Recommendations Assessment, Development and Evaluation) are widely used to assess the certainty of evidence and the strength of clinical recommendations, complementing traditional evidence hierarchies.

== Related concepts ==
Methodology has several related concepts, such as paradigm and algorithm. In the context of science, a paradigm is a conceptual worldview. It consists of a number of basic concepts and general theories, that determine how the studied phenomena are to be conceptualized and which scientific methods are considered reliable for studying them. Various theorists emphasize similar aspects of methodologies, for example, that they shape the general outlook on the studied phenomena and help the researcher see them in a new light.

In computer science, an algorithm is a procedure or methodology to reach the solution of a problem with a finite number of steps. Each step has to be precisely defined so it can be carried out in an unambiguous manner for each application. For example, the Euclidean algorithm is an algorithm that solves the problem of finding the greatest common divisor of two integers. It is based on simple steps like comparing the two numbers and subtracting one from the other.

== See also ==
- Paradigm – Set of distinct concepts or thought patterns
- Ethnomethodology
- Philosophical methodology
- Political methodology
- Scientific method
- Software development process
- Survey methodology
