= Helen A. Myron =

American costume designer (1905–1983)

- Born: Helen Alberta Markowitz; April 8, 1905; San Francisco, California, U.S.
- Died: September 11, 1983 (aged 78); San Diego County, California, U.S.
- Other name: Helen Alberta Cramer
- Occupation: Costume designer
- Years active: 1933 - 1940
- Known for: Designing costumes for motion picture actors
- Spouse: Duncan Cramer

Helen A. Myron (1905–1983) was an American costume designer who worked at Fox Film and 20th Century Fox from 1933 to 1940. She is credited on about 40 motion pictures, mostly B movies including five Charlie Chan films. She has been noted in several histories of costume design for film.

Myron graduated from the University of California - Berkeley, and commenced her career in costume design in 1933. In 1941 she married Duncan Cramer, who was an art director at 20th Century Fox. Cramer and Myron are credited together on five films released in 1935 and 1936. After 1940, there is just a single, 1947 credit for Helen Myron; Duncan Cramer's career continued through 1971. A photograph of Myron's "hostess pyjama outfit", worn by Claire Trevor in the 1935 film Navy Wife, is still widely reproduced.
