= Disneyfication =

Transformation into Disney-like characteristics

In the field of sociology, the term Disneyfication describes the commercial transformation of things (e.g. entertainment) or environments into something simplified, controlled, and 'safe'—reminiscent of the Walt Disney brand (such as its media, theme parks, etc.).

The term broadly describes the process of stripping a real place or thing of its original character and representing it in a sanitized format where references to anything negative or inconvenient are removed, and the facts are simplified with the intent of rendering the subject more pleasant and easily grasped. In the case of physical places, this involves replacing the real with an idealized, tourist-friendly veneer—resembling the "Main Street, U.S.A." attractions at Disney theme parks. Based on rapid Western-style globalization and consumerist lifestyles, the term Disneyfication is mostly used derogatorily to imply the social and cultural homogenization of things. In other words, according to The Disneyization of Society, "to Disneyfy means to translate or transform an object into something superficial and even simplistic." The term can also be used to describe the internationalization of American mass culture; the notion of entertainment that is bigger, faster, and better but with worldwide, Americanized uniformity. More specifically, some may use Disneyfication to be associated with a statement about the cultural products of the Disney company itself, denoting the general process of rendering material (a fairy tale, novel, historical event) into a standardized format that is recognizable as being a product of the Walt Disney Company according to Bryman.

== Disney in popular culture ==
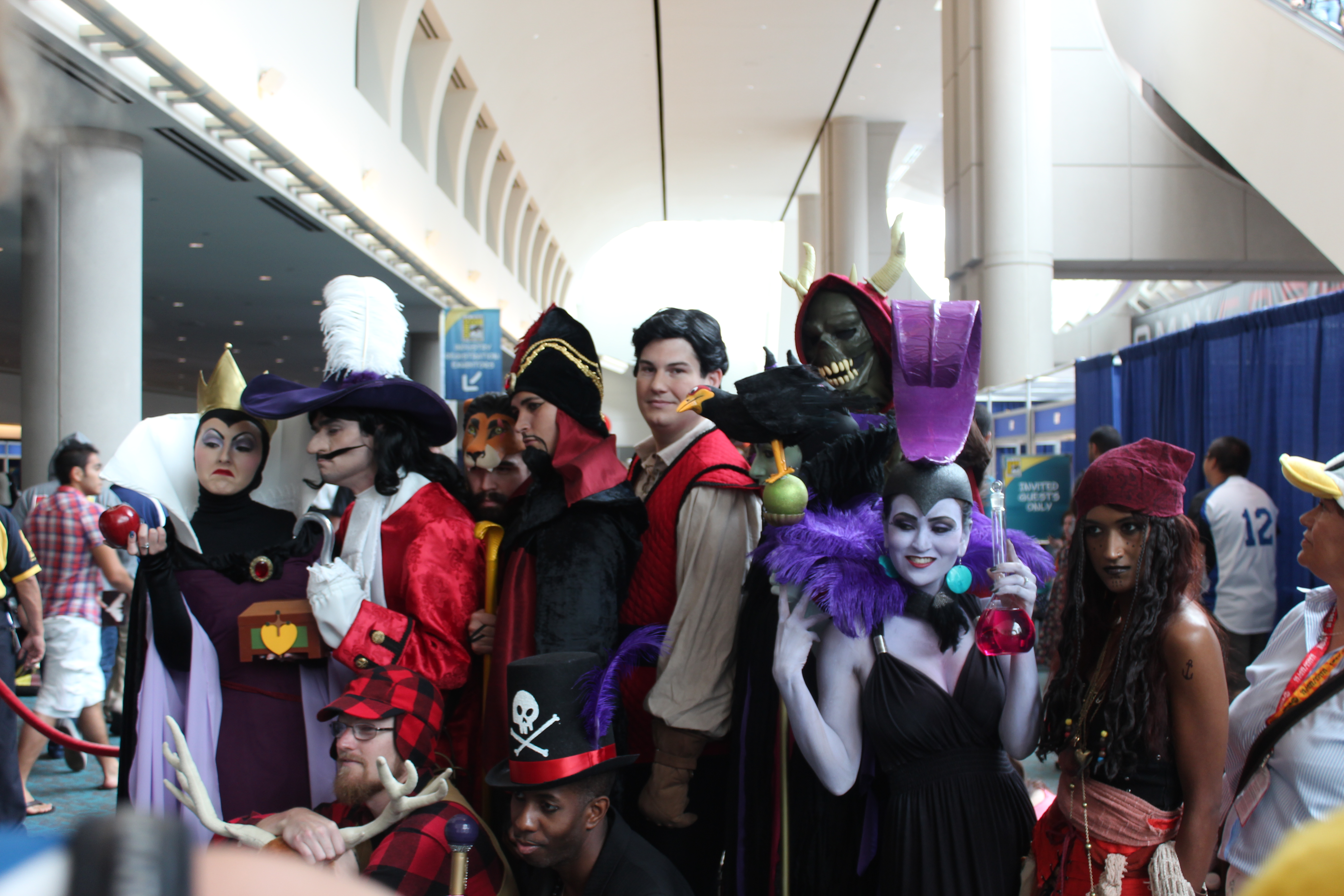
Group dresses up as Disney characters at convention.

At the start of the twentieth century, popular culture was reaching its highest potential in terms of what it would become today by modern standards of overall American culture. The mass production of pleasure and entertainment is meant for a profit-inducing audience and that change within the entertainment industry is actually catered to its audience. Trends are influenced by the people of the time period in which it was being produced. The history of popular culture can be traced back to the start of early human communities and the addition of electricity in the home that really defined the modern concept of culture, with examples from the 1900s such as the radio, bright signs, automobiles, and the television.

The Walt Disney Company created a monumental shift in the world of popular culture since the decision to use Mickey Mouse as the icon and purveyor of the American Dream. The company gained the ability to influence the world with the power of association and gradually created cultural shifts as a result of Disneyfication becoming so popular in the west. The desire and demand for Americanized or Disneyfied culture spread to other countries through film, songs, architecture, stories, and other real-world elements. Over time, each concept in popular culture defined the overall culture of the time it was developed and Walt Disney's addition to Hollywood altered local and international perceptions of popular culture through Disneyfication, which is typically used to alter a topic in popular culture like stories, amusement parks, or fan conventions. Events like wars and other major world events became the driving forces behind these cultural shifts and can be held accountable for the push to Disneyfy the world, or as the definition insinuates, to make a safe space or thing in an unsafe environment or time. The Walt Disney Company was created as a result of creating something out of a desire to comfort scared individuals or to alter the appearance to appeal to family-friendly ideals in a controlled manner, but the term Disneyfication did not come until 1959.

At the start of the Company's history, after World War I, Walt Disney was inspired to use his interest in expanding the imagination to cure the world's distress and anguish. After coming back from the war in 1918, the young Walt Disney took his first step in the animation world and got a job that allowed him to draw for a film company. By 1922, Disney spent his time recruiting animators in order to jumpstart his first company, Laugh-o-Grams, which led to Walt Disney's first out-of-the-box idea. In 1923, halfway through the filming of Alice Comedies, the company went broke and forced Disney to sell his camera in order to move in with an uncle in Hollywood. Disney became the epitome of the American Dream and started a billion-dollar company in a run-down garage. By 1928, Walt Disney began working with a distributor that allowed for the creations of the company to be recognized by hundreds, including the success of the famed character Oswald the Lucky Rabbit whose rights were later given to another company. Mickey Mouse became the most famous character in the world and the new face of the Walt Disney Company. Mickey's success became far greater than anticipated by the Disney animators and his fame surpassed that of the actor Charlie Chaplin among all ages and was used in global platforms such as international political propaganda because of his popularity among people. Every artwork produced since then has been a clear trademark of the Disney name and, in turn, every cultural aspect in the Disney films or world has been changed to fit the Disneyfication process.

== Disneyfication of society ==
According to Merriam-Webster, Disneyfication is the process in sociology in which a person, place, or things are simplified or altered to meet the same image requirements of Disney productions. Characters and stories created or used by Disney have been able to alter the ideas of stories, art, gender, sexuality, disability, race, and perspective of the ordinary. The Disney craze became so great and widespread that The Walt Disney Company was able to Disneyfy amusement parks for other countries. These places in Europe and Asia now have their own piece of the desired Disneyfied Western society. The major success of the media produced by the company is also an important key factor and attributed to the specific techniques of earlier films that left an impact on people, including psychologically affecting events like the death of a family member or rules for being seen as beautiful. The term Disneyfication has been used in sociological studies to explain the process of the transformation of things to essentially sugarcoat the reality of unsafe environments or issues like the threat of a unique identity.

Map to Epcot's World Showcase

For example, Walt Disney's creation of an amusement park is the embodiment of what Disneyfication was meant to describe, an escape from a harsh reality. Imagination was the original source of inspiration for Mr. Disney and, according to Disneyland and Culture, "The happiest place on earth can in the twenty-first century accommodate what in the twentieth represented the pure and abject horror that people fled to Disneyland to escape from". The Walt Disney Company intricately pitched the theme park to their targeted audience, those who wanted an escape. In particular, the parks were given names ending in world or land to give the illusion that real life stops and fantasy begins because the "imagineers" are able to make dreams come true by focusing on different themes not seen in everyday life. EPCOT, one of Disney's many themed parks, opened in 1982 with the purpose of inviting the public to explore a fun multicultural experience for families and friends. The attraction brings the chance to visit over 11 cultural experiences, including a variety of cuisines, without having to travel far and with the comfort of knowing one is in a safe and controlled space. This "land" alone has been able to bring more exposure to controlled cultural exposure by creating an Americanized vision of Asian and European architecture, food, music, clothing, and stories. It also provides the ability to expand Disneyfication into other countries like China and Japan with the openings of Shanghai Disneyland and Tokyo Disney, despite the fact that people all over the world have grown fearful over time that their own folk tales or myths would fall victim to a form of Disneyfication. Walt Disney's rapid Disneyfication of nostalgic stories is often connected to American capitalism but still creates success in the ways in which Walt Disney presented the park and films to the American audience. The Walt Disney Company found a clever and comforting way for Disneyfication to make its way into the entertainment business worldwide.

The term Disneyfication was coined by Lawrence Lipton in 1959, while Disneyization was coined by New York University's Peter K. Fallon and popularized by Alan Bryman in The Disneyization of Society (2004), in which he described it as "the process by which the principles of the Disney theme parks are coming to dominate more and more sectors of American society as well as the rest of the world." Though the two are largely used interchangeably, Bryman states his preference of Disneyization over Disneyfication because he takes the latter to be accompanied by negative connotations and described four dimensions of Disneyization in particular:

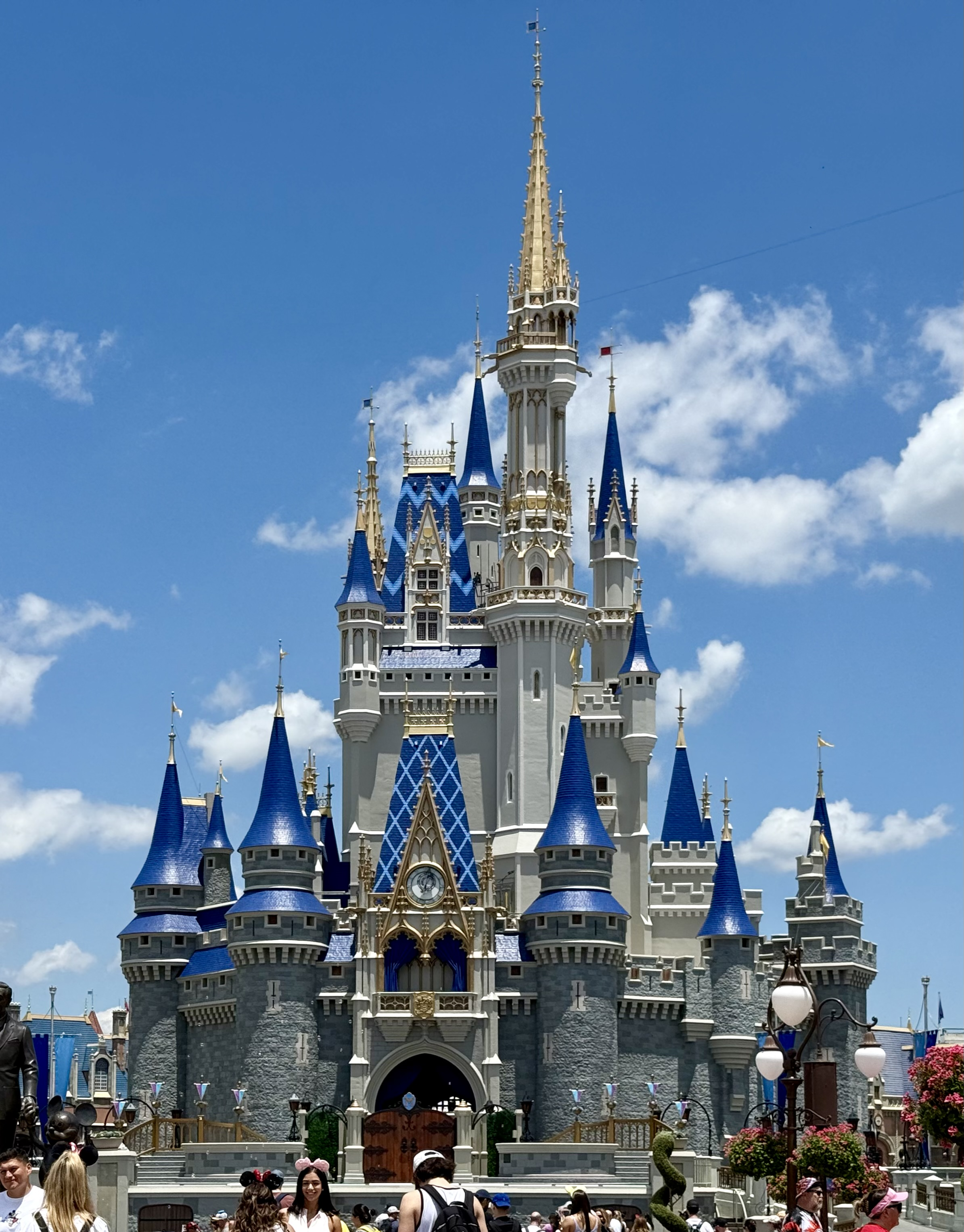
Cinderella's castle near Fantasyland in Disney Park

- Theming – where an institution or object is placed into a narrative that is mostly unrelated to the institution or object to which it is applied. Example: themed restaurants (e.g. Rainforest Cafe), or themed hotels on the Las Vegas Strip.
- Hybrid consumption – where multiple forms of consumption that are associated with different industries become "interlocked with each other." Example: restaurants at IKEA and Costco.
- Merchandising – the promotion and sale of goods or services with objects bearing copyright images and/or logos. Example: clothing, pens, and stationery with New York City branding.
- Performative labor – making employees not only providers of services but also of entertainment; in other words, frontline service work is made a performance.

== See also ==
- Escapism
- Celebration, Florida

Similar concepts

- Cocacolonization
- McDonaldization
- Walmarting
