= Good Dame =

1934 film by Marion Gering

- Directed by: Marion Gering
- Screenplay by: Sam Hellman; Vincent Lawrence; William R. Lipman
- Produced by: B. P. Schulberg
- Starring: Sylvia Sidney; Fredric March; Jack La Rue; Noel Francis; Russell Hopton; Bradley Page; Kathleen Burke
- Cinematography: Leon Shamroy
- Edited by: Jane Loring
- Production company: Paramount Pictures
- Distributed by: Paramount Pictures
- Release date: February 16, 1934
- Running time: 72 minutes
- Country: United States
- Language: English

Good Dame is a 1934 American pre-Code drama film directed by Marion Gering and written by Sam Hellman, Vincent Lawrence and William R. Lipman. The film stars Sylvia Sidney, Fredric March, Jack La Rue, Noel Francis, Russell Hopton, Bradley Page and Kathleen Burke. The film was released on February 16, 1934, by Paramount Pictures.

== Cast ==
- Sylvia Sidney as Lillie Taylor
- Fredric March as Mace Townsley
- Jack La Rue as Bluch Brown
- Noel Francis as Puff Warner
- Russell Hopton as 'Spats' Edwards
- Bradley Page as Regan
- Kathleen Burke as Zandra
- Guy Usher as Detective Fallon
- Joseph J. Franz as Detective Scanlon
- Miami Alvarez as Cora
- William Farnum as Judge Flynn
