= The Sheik Steps Out =

1937 film by Irving Pichel

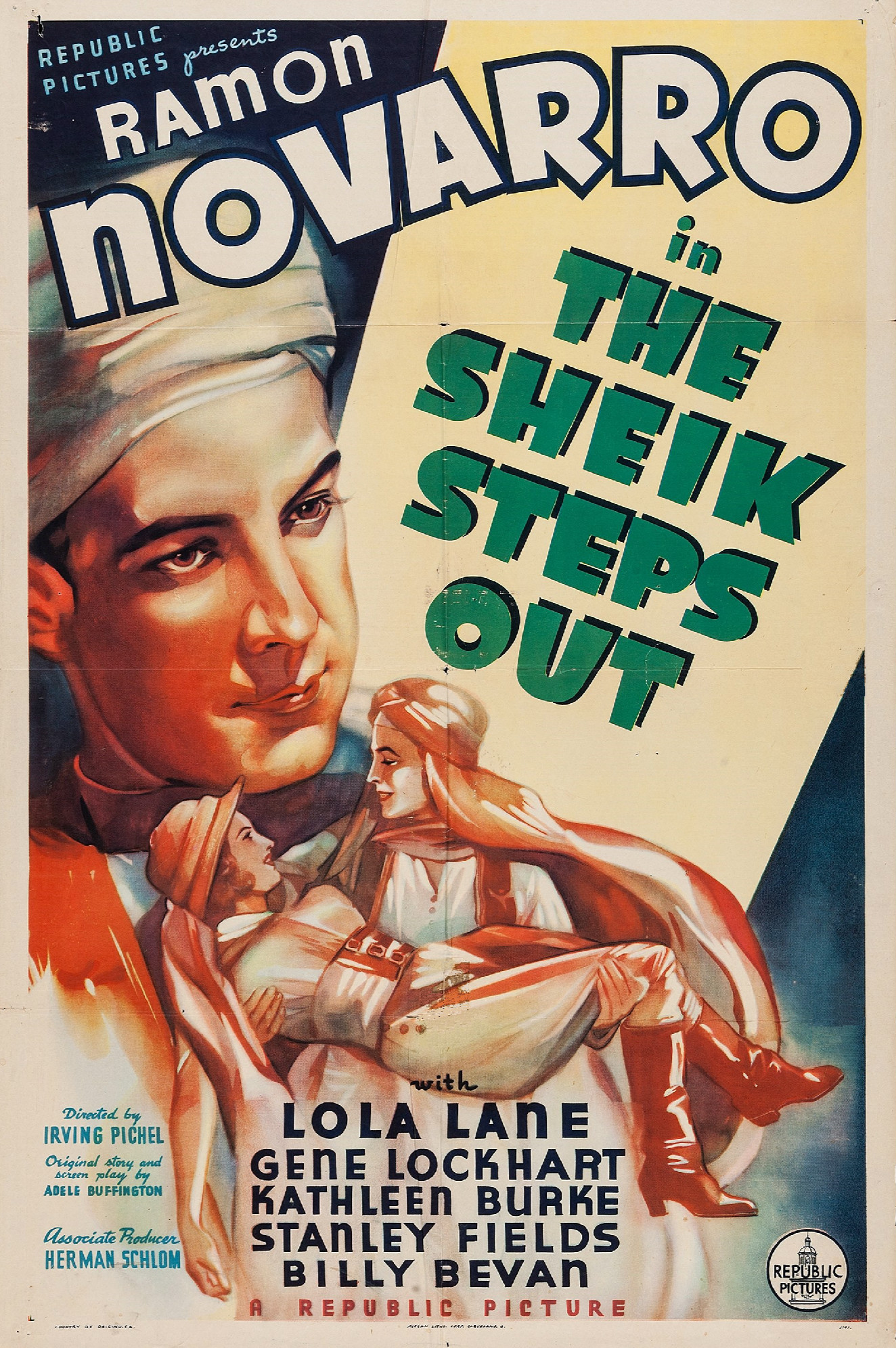
- Theatrical release poster
- Directed by: Irving Pichel
- Screenplay by: Adele Buffington; Gordon Kahn
- Produced by: Herman Schlom
- Starring: Ramon Novarro; Lola Lane; Gene Lockhart; Kathleen Burke; Stanley Fields; Billy Bevan
- Cinematography: Jack A. Marta
- Edited by: Ernest J. Nims; Murray Seldeen
- Music by: Alberto Colombo
- Production company: Republic Pictures
- Distributed by: Republic Pictures
- Release date: September 6, 1937
- Running time: 65 minutes
- Country: United States
- Language: English

The Sheik Steps Out is a 1937 American musical film directed by Irving Pichel and written by Adele Buffington and Gordon Kahn. The film stars Ramon Novarro, Lola Lane, Gene Lockhart, Kathleen Burke, Stanley Fields and Billy Bevan. The film was released on September 6, 1937, by Republic Pictures.

== Cast ==
- Ramon Novarro as Ahmed Ben Nesib
- Lola Lane as Phyllis 'Flip' Murdock
- Gene Lockhart as Samuel P. Murdock
- Kathleen Burke as Gloria Parker
- Stanley Fields as Abu Saal
- Billy Bevan as Munson
- Charlotte Treadway as Polly Parker
- Robert Coote as Lord Eustace Byington
- Leonid Kinskey as Allusi Ali
- Georges Renavent as Count Mario
- Jamiel Hasson as Kisub
- C. Montague Shaw as Dr. Peabody - Minister
- George Sorel as Lt. Bordeaux

== Critical reception ==
Motion Picture Herald stated that marketers of the film could exploit "the return of Ramon Novarro to motion pictures after an extended and never very widely explained absence." Noting that the film had elements in common with Novarro's earlier successes, it commented, "Adele Buffington's story and screen play indicate complete comprehension on her part of the showman's requirements in effecting the reinstatement of the star as a box office figure."
