= Kathleen Burke =

American actress (1913–1980)

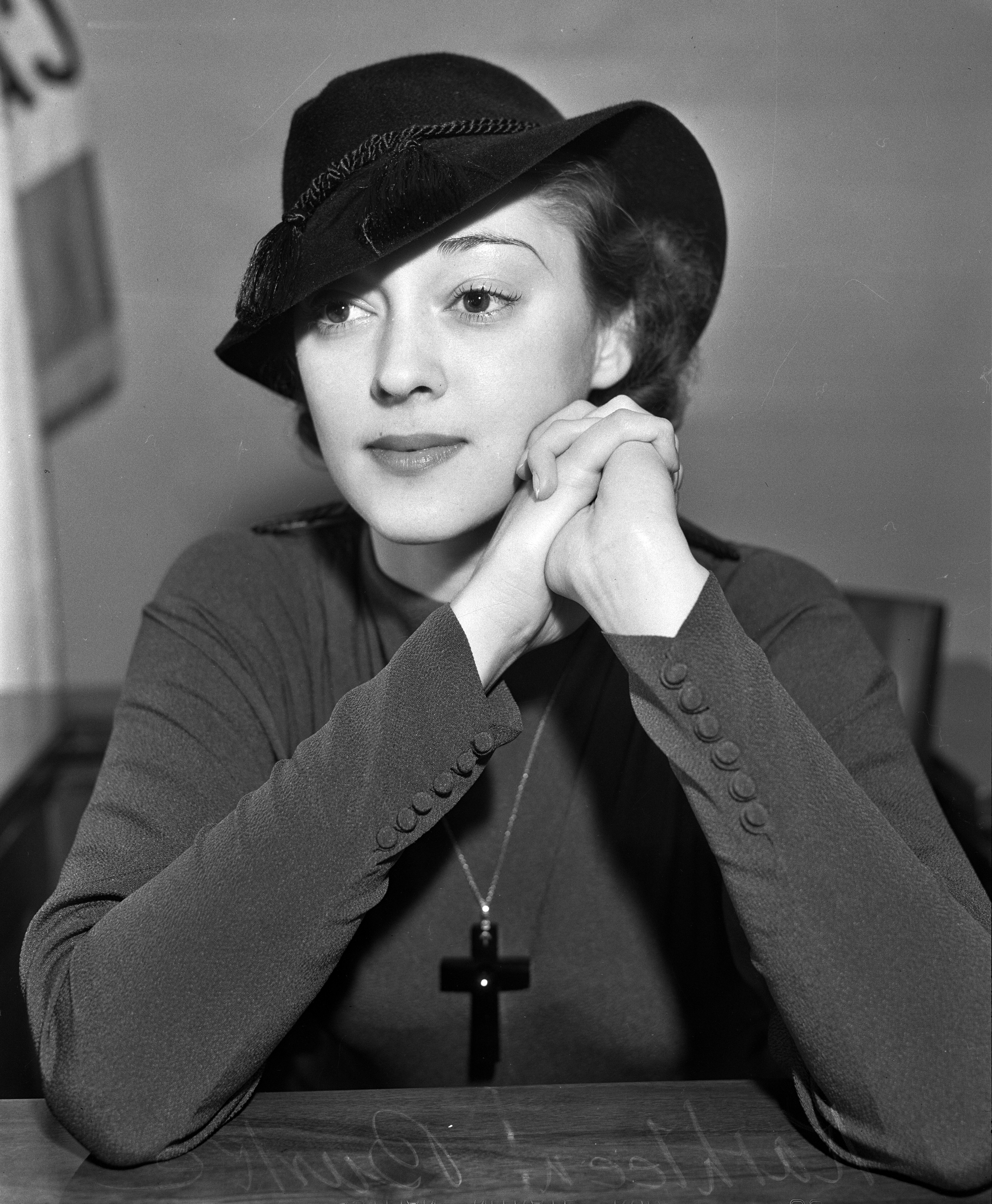
- Burke in 1934
- Born: Kathleen B. Burke; September 5, 1913; Hammond, Indiana, U.S.
- Died: April 9, 1980 (aged 66); Chicago, Illinois, U.S.
- Occupation: Actress
- Years active: 1932–1942
- Spouses: Glen Nelson Rardin (m. 1933; div. 1934): Jose Torres Fernandez (m. 1936; div. 19??); Forrest L. Smith (m. 19??)
- Children: 1

Kathleen B. Burke (September 5, 1913 – April 9, 1980) was an American movie actress of the 1930s and former model.

== Early years ==
Born in Hammond, Indiana, in 1913, Burke was a graduate of Hammond High School. She moved with her parents to Chicago when she was 15, and she acted in amateur productions there. She worked as a dental assistant in Chicago.

== Career ==
Burke was a fashion model and acted on radio in Chicago before winning a talent contest sponsored by Paramount Pictures to play Lota the Panther Woman in Island of Lost Souls (1932), the first sound film adaptation of H.G. Wells's novel The Island of Dr. Moreau. The contest, announced in July 1932, reportedly had 60,000 applicants from around the country. Burke was announced as the winner on September 29.

This success led to more than a score of screen appearances over the following six years, most notably as the leading lady in The Lives of a Bengal Lancer (1935) opposite Gary Cooper, and The Last Outpost with Cary Grant that same year. Her final film role was in 1938, whereupon she retired from screen acting at the age of 25.

By the early 1940s, Burke sought to escape the Panther Woman image by acting on stage in other kinds of roles. In 1942, she acted in both a drama, Night Must Fall, and a comedy, Yes, My Darling Daughter in summer theater at Great Neck, New York.

== Personal life ==
Burke married Glenn Rardin, a photographer whose pictures of her helped her to win a nationwide Panther Girl contest. They separated less than two months after the wedding, reconciled, then separated again and eventually divorced on November 8, 1934. She was also married to Jose Fernandez, a Spanish dancer from Mexico. Her last marriage was to Forrest Smith, who survived her.

== Death ==
Burke died on April 9, 1980, in Chicago, at age 66.

== Partial filmography ==
- Island of Lost Souls (1932) - Lota, the Panther Woman
- Murders in the Zoo (1933) - Evelyn Gorman
- Sunset Pass (1933) - Jane Preston
- Torch Singer (1933) - Sobbing Girl (uncredited)
- The Mad Game (1933) - Marilyn Kirk
- Six of a Kind (1934) - Woman (uncredited)
- Good Dame (1934) - Zandra
- School for Girls (1934) - Gladys Deacon
- Bulldog Drummond Strikes Back (1934) - Jane Sothern (uncredited)
- The Merry Widow (1934) - Prisoner (uncredited)
- The Lives of a Bengal Lancer (1935) - Tania Volkanskaya
- Rocky Mountain Mystery (1935) - Flora Ballard
- Mutiny Ahead (1935) - Carol Bixby
- The Awakening of Jim Burke (1935) - Laura
- Navy Wife (1935) - Serena Morrison
- The Last Outpost (1935) - Ilya
- Nevada (1935) - Hettie Ide
- The Lion Man (1936) - Adelaide Passmore
- Craig's Wife (1936) - Eulilah
- The Sheik Steps Out (1937) - Gloria Parker
- Boy of the Streets (1938) - Julie Stone
- Rascals (1938) - Dr. Carter's Nurse (final film role)
