= Murders in the Zoo =

1933 film by A. Edward Sutherland

- Directed by: A. Edward Sutherland
- Written by: Philip Wylie; Seton I. Miller
- Starring: Charlie Ruggles; Lionel Atwill; Gail Patrick; Randolph Scott; Kathleen Burke
- Cinematography: Ernest Haller
- Production company: Paramount Productions, Inc.
- Distributed by: Paramount Productions, Inc.
- Release date: March 31, 1933
- Country: United States

Murders in the Zoo is a 1933 pre-Code horror film directed by A. Edward Sutherland, written by Philip Wylie and Seton I. Miller. Particularly dark, even for its time, film critic Leonard Maltin called the film "astonishingly grisly."

== Plot ==
Big-game hunter and wealthy zoologist Eric Gorman is an insanely jealous husband who uses his animal knowledge to dispose of his impulsive wife's lovers. The film opens in an Indian jungle with Gorman using a needle and thread to sew a colleague's mouth closed after having discovered that he had kissed his wife, and then he seals the man's fate by abandoning him in the jungle with the wild beasts. Gorman later pretends to be surprised at hearing that the man had been eaten by tigers. Both Gorman and his wife Evelyn then return to America aboard a ship packed with captured animals he intends to add to his collection at a major zoo. On the ship, Evelyn has a relationship with Roger Hewitt. She tries to keep it secret from Gorman, but he finds out. Once back in the States, he begins to devise a plan to kill Hewitt.

The zoo is beginning to run into financial trouble and the new press agent, Peter Yates, a man terrified of most of the zoo's animals and considered to be an alcoholic, suggests hosting a fundraising dinner for the rich to raise funds and awareness. The last straw is when Gorman finds his wife at Hewitt's apartment where they have been plotting their escape and her divorce. Gorman invites Hewitt to the dinner and poisons him with mamba venom that he obtained from the zoo's laboratory doctor, Jack Woodford. Evelyn accuses her husband of murdering Hewitt. Outraged, Gorman attacks her, but she is able to escape into his office where she finds a mechanical mamba head seeping with real mamba poison in his desk. She now knows for a fact that he killed Hewitt, and takes the snake head with the intention of telling Dr. Woodford. Gorman finds his wife and throws her to the alligators, where she is torn to shreds.

The following day the zoo is closed as keepers search for the missing poisonous mamba. A group of children who sneak into the zoo discover tattered remains of Evelyn's dress. Dr. Woodford accuses Gorman of murdering both his wife and Roger Hewitt. Gorman attacks Woodford with the mechanical snake head, just as he had done to Hewitt. The doctor's assistant Jerry gives Woodford a shot of the antitoxin he had created in time to save his life. She also realizes that Gorman is responsible for the apparent mamba attack when he tries to stop her, and sounds the zoo's alarms. A police chase ensues as Gorman is pursued through the zoo. Gorman releases big cats from the carnivore house to keep the police back but they chase Gorman and force him into the cage of a reticulated python, which then slowly kills and devours him.

In the epilogue, Jerry visits a convalescing Dr. Woodford in the hospital. The stress, meanwhile, has caused Yates to fall off the wagon, and he is seen fearlessly meandering through the zoo, even swatting on the nose a still free lion that had been stalking him. The lion turns away and Yates drunkenly moseys on singing a song.

== Cast ==
Cast sourced from the American Film Institute.

- Charlie Ruggles as Peter Yates
- Lionel Atwill as Eric Gorman
- Gail Patrick as Jerry Evans
- Randolph Scott as Dr. Jack Woodford
- John Davis Lodge as Roger Hewitt
- Kathleen Burke as Evelyn Gorman
- Harry Beresford as Professor Evans

Edward McWade makes an uncredited appearance as Dan; as do Jane Darwell and Samuel S. Hinds as banquet guests.

== Production ==
Following the release of Island of Lost Souls in late December 1932 in New York, Paramount Pictures began preparing work on Murders in the Zoo. On December 22 and 23, William H. Wright of Paramount Publix Corporation sent two copies of the script for Murders in the Zoo and some substitute pages to Dr. James Wingate at the Association of Motion Picture Producers in Hollywood. By December 27, The Hollywood Citizen News announced that Paramount had added Randolph Scott to Murders in the Zoo, with Scott beating other actors to the role such as Stuart Erwin, Gordon Westcott and John Lodge. Also cast is Gail Patrick, Charlie Ruggles and John Lodge. The initial director set up for the film was Edward Sutherland.

William Wright sent the censors the final script for Murders in the Zoo on December 28, despite the film being set to start filming the day beforehand. Censors objected to scenes of where a character proclaims "Good God!" and where a character kicks his wife's hand loose to drop her into a pond. Further casting is completed after this letter including Kathleen Burke from Island of Lost Souls, taking it away from Adrienne Ames, Lona Andre and Susan Fleming. The films final script is dated January 4, 1933 and is in production by January 5, 1933.

To promote the film, Paramount invited the press and some of their stars (including Marlene Dietrich, Gary Cooper, Miriam Hopkins, Cary Grant, Frances Dee and The Marx Brothers) to a luncheon and to view the shooting of the wild beasts for the finale of the film. On set, 17 of the cats got engaged in a fight which led to the death of a puma.

== Release ==
On February 28, 1933, Paramount previews Murders in the Zoo at the Alexander Theatre in Glendale. The preview version of the film ran for 65 minutes while the final release ran at 61 minutes. Several censors from New York, Massachusetts, Pennsylvania, Ontario, and the United Kingdom requested censorship between March 10 and March 23, ranging from requests to remove scenes of a man's mouth sewn together to scenes of a woman being thrown into the alligator pond. The film was banned in Germany, Sweden and Latvia. While Quebec and Australia initially banned the film, it later passed with a variety of cuts.

Murders in the Zoo was distributed theatrically by Paramount Productions, Inc. on March 31, 1933, where it opened in New York at Broadway's Paramount Theatre. For its first six days at the Paramount the film took in $18,540. In comparison, the high had been Finn and Hattie with $85,900 and the low was Hello, Everybody which took in $15,600. In Los Angeles, the film grossed $14,000 in its one-week run at the Paramount and $23,000 at Hollywood's Paramount. Film historian Gregory William Mank described the film as "a box office disappointment", while Norbert Lusk wrote in the Los Angeles Times about the New York Box Office that the film had "pretty good reviews on the whole, but with no enthusiasm wasted. The latter is difficult to understand for horror films go this is more convincing and out of the ordinary than many and provides legitimate thrills... However, in spite of these merits, the cast is not strong in box office names and because of this it may never achieve the success it deserves"

Along with The Mad Ghoul, The Mad Doctor of Market Street and The Strange Case of Doctor Rx, Murders in the Zoo was released on Blu-ray as part of Scream! Factory's Universal Horror Collection Volume 2 on July 23, 2019, with a commentary track by Gregory William Mank. In 2023 it was released on Blu-ray in the UK as part of a compilation from Eureka Entertainment titled Creeping Horror, with a commentary track by Kevin Lyons and Jonathan Rigby.

== Reception ==
From contemporary reviews, Variety referred to the film as "A weak sister, Murders in the Zoo will have to battle for what it gets." and that "Edward Sutherland's direction slipped up in allowing Lionel Atwill to become too heavy. Actor is sufficient of a menace to get along without a hideous laugh and a flock of withering looks." The review went on to note that Kathleen Burke "fails to impress" and that Gail Patrick is "no beauty" and that the film "will have to depend on the animals and horror to attract." The Los Angeles Times raved over the movie, saying, "Roars, shrieks, and cackling of the wild animals on the screen at the Paramount yesterday were echoed to an amazing degree by the audience, at times driven to a mild state of hysteria by scenes in 'Murders in the Zoo'." However, a New York Times movie critic says, "Those who demand their leaven of romance even in horror pictures are likely to find 'Murders in the Zoo' inadequate in this direction." Though he also claims that "it happens that the director has been almost too effective in dramatizing these cheerless events…Lionell Atwill as the insanely jealous husband is almost too convincing for comfort…[and judging] by its ability to chill and terrify, this film is a successful melodrama."

From retrospective reviews, Mark Clark wrote an article on Lionel Atwill as an actor and says that Murders in the Zoo was the "quintessential Lionel Atwill film." In the article Clark claims that "Atwill performs here with the quiet, coiled striking power of a beast tracking its prey. He glides effortlessly across the screen, speaking volumes with a barely perceptible change in tenor in his voice, unveiling his character's hidden passions with a simple, unguarded glance."
