= Star for a Night (film) =

1936 film by Lewis Seiler

- Directed by: Lewis Seiler
- Written by: Saul Elkins; Frances Hyland; Michaelis Stangeland
- Produced by: Sol M. Wurtzel
- Starring: Claire Trevor; Jane Darwell; Arline Judge
- Cinematography: Ernest Palmer
- Edited by: Alex Troffey
- Music by: Samuel Kaylin; Charles Maxwell
- Production company: Twentieth Century Fox
- Distributed by: Twentieth Century Fox
- Release date: August 20, 1936
- Running time: 76 minutes
- Country: United States
- Language: English

Star for a Night is a 1936 American drama film directed by Lewis Seiler and starring Claire Trevor, Jane Darwell and Arline Judge.

The film's sets were designed by the art director Duncan Cramer.

== Cast ==
- Claire Trevor as Nina Lind
- Jane Darwell as Mrs. Martha Lind
- Arline Judge as Mamie de la Mont
- Evelyn Venable as Anna Lind
- J. Edward Bromberg as Doctor Spelimeyer
- Dean Jagger as Fritz Lind
- Alan Dinehart as James Dunning
- Joyce Compton as Ellen Romaine
- Susan Fleming as Mildred La Rue
- Adrienne Marden as Katherine Lind
- Frank Reicher as Doctor Heimkin
- Dickie Walters as Paul Lind
- Chick Chandler as Eddie
- Astrid Allwyn as Josephine Hall
- Hattie McDaniel as Hattie

== Bibliography ==
- Goble, Alan. The Complete Index to Literary Sources in Film. Walter de Gruyter, 1999.
