= Black Sheep (1935 film) =

1935 film by Allan Dwan

- Directed by: Allan Dwan
- Written by: Allen Rivkin; Allan Dwan
- Produced by: Sol M. Wurtzel
- Starring: Edmund Lowe; Claire Trevor; Tom Brown
- Cinematography: Arthur C. Miller
- Edited by: Alex Troffey
- Music by: Samuel Kaylin
- Production company: Fox Film Corporation
- Distributed by: 20th Century-Fox Film Corporation
- Release date: June 14, 1935
- Running time: 76 minutes
- Country: United States
- Language: English

Black Sheep is a 1935 American mystery drama film directed by Allan Dwan and starring Edmund Lowe, Claire Trevor, and Tom Brown. It was produced by the Fox Film Corporation. The film's sets were designed by the art director Duncan Cramer.

== Plot ==
Aboard a luxury liner, gambler John Francis Dugan makes the acquaintance of socialite Jeanette Foster, who has a reputation for using men to get her way. Jeanette cajoles him into sneaking her into First Class, where they see young Fred Curtis lose $1,200 at poker to two oilmen, Belcher and Schmelling.

Fred's troubles grow worse when the haughty Millicent Bath has his markers. A noted thief who has stolen a princess's pearls, she blackmails him into helping her sneak the pearls into the country. Fred is so forlorn that he considers jumping overboard, until Jeanette stops him.

Dugan decides to help. He wins back Fred's debts at cards. When they return to Fred's stateroom, Dugan spots a photo of Fred's deceased mother and is shocked to discover that she was his ex-wife; they were from different social classes, and under her wealthy mother's influence, she left Dugan and took their child. Fred is his long-lost son. Dugan resolves never to tell Fred he is his father.

Mrs. Bath has hidden the pearls inside a cane's handle. Dugan distracts her, replaces the pearls with pills, then hides the valuables inside the pocket of Belcher, the oilman. They spill out at Customs and are claimed by Mrs. Bath to belong to her, causing her to be taken away by the authorities. Dugan says goodbye to Fred and meets with Jeannette, who promises to change her old ways. He proposes to her and they kiss.

== Cast ==
- Edmund Lowe as John Francis Dugan
- Claire Trevor as Jeanette Foster
- Tom Brown as Fred Curtis
- Eugene Pallette as Colonel Upton Calhoun Belcher
- Adrienne Ames as Mrs. Millicent Caldwell Bath
- Herbert Mundin as Oscar
- Ford Sterling as Mather
- Jed Prouty as Orville Schmelling
- Billy Bevan as Alfred
- David Torrence as Captain Savage
- Mary Blackwood as Edith
- Wade Boteler as Customs Officer
- Don Brodie as Reporter
- Tex Brodus as Passenger
- Edward Cecil as Bridge Player
- Allan Conrad as Third Officer
- Robert Elliott as Detective Clancy
- Bess Flowers as Woman at Bar
- Grace Goodall as Bridge Player
- Douglas Gordon as Steward
- Maude Turner Gordon as Mrs. Curtis
- Dell Henderson as Customs Officer
- Colin Kenny as Ship's Officer
- James B. 'Pop' Kenton as Bridge Player
- Slim Martin as Orchestra Leader
- Richard Powell as Riley - Customs Officer
- Gloria Roy as Passenger
- Reginald Sheffield as Oscar's Friend
- Edwin Stanley as Oscar's Friend
- Libby Taylor as Betty - Millicent's Maid
- Silvia Vaughan as Stewardess
- Marion Weldon as Passenger

== Bibliography ==
- Lombardi, Frederic. Allan Dwan and the Rise and Decline of the Hollywood Studios. McFarland, 2013.
- Solomon, Aubrey. The Fox Film Corporation, 1915-1935: A History and Filmography. McFarland, 2011.
