= Billy Bevan =

Australian actor (1887–1957)

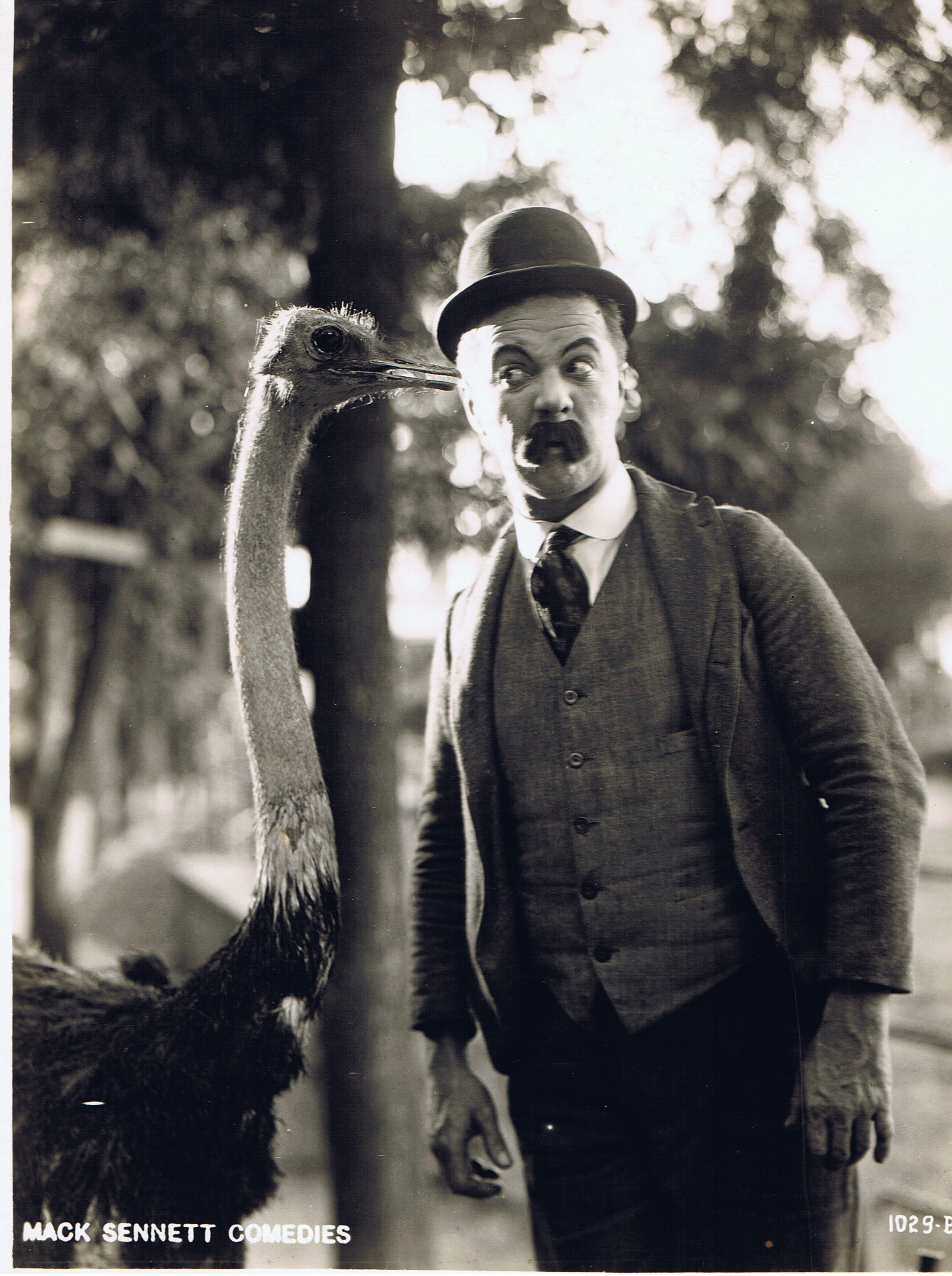
- Bevan, 1920s
- Born: William Bevan Harris; 29 September 1887; Orange, New South Wales, Australia
- Died: 26 November 1957 (aged 70); Escondido, California, U.S.
- Occupations: Actor; comedian
- Years active: 1916–1952
- Spouses: Leah Leona Roberts (1918–52), Betsy Rees (1954–his death)
- Children: 2 daughters

Billy Bevan (born William Bevan Harris; 29 September 1887 – 26 November 1957) was an Australian-born vaudevillian who became an American film actor. He appeared in more than 250 American films from 1916 to 1952. He died just before new audiences discovered him in Robert Youngson's silent-comedy compilations. The Youngson films mispronounce his name as "Be-VAN"; Bevan himself offered the proper pronunciation in a Voice of Hollywood reel in 1930: "Bevan" rhyming with "seven".

== Career ==
Bevan was born in the country town of Orange, New South Wales, Australia. He went on the stage at an early age, traveled to Sydney and spent eight years in Australian light opera, performing as Willie Bevan. He sailed to America with the Pollard’s Lilliputian Opera Company in 1912, and later toured Canada. Bevan broke into films with the Sigmund Lubin studio in 1916. When the company disbanded, Bevan became a supporting actor in Mack Sennett movie comedies. An expressive pantomimist, Bevan's quiet scene-stealing attracted attention, and by 1922 Bevan was a Sennett star. He supplemented his income, however, by establishing a citrus and avocado farm at Escondido, California.

Usually filmed wearing a derby hat and a drooping mustache, Bevan may not have possessed an indelible screen character like Charlie Chaplin but he had a friendly, funny presence in the frantic Sennett comedies. Much of the comedy depended on Bevan's skilled timing and reactions; he was the first to perform the familiar "oyster" routine—in which a bowl of "fresh oyster stew" shows alarming signs of life and battles the guy trying to eat it—in the Sennett comedy Wandering Willies (1926). The routine was later performed by Curly Howard, Lou Costello, and Huntz Hall.

By the mid-1920s Bevan was often teamed with Andy Clyde; Clyde soon graduated to his own starring series. The late 1920s found Bevan playing in wild marital farces for Sennett. Bevan lost his starring berth when Sennett canceled all contracts to retool his studio for the new talking pictures; Bevan had already completed several silent shorts, which were released gradually through 1929.

The advent of talkies took their toll on the careers of many silent stars, including Billy Bevan. Although he did co-star in a few talkie shorts, including the "Taxi Boys" comedy Thundering Taxis (1932) and the ZaSu Pitts short She Whoops to Conquer (1934), his starring roles had come to an end. He was still a resourceful actor, and in 1929 he began a second career as a character actor and bit player: a bus driver in High Voltage, a hotel employee in the Mae Murray film Peacock Alley, Second Lieutenant Trotter in Journey's End. For the next 20 years he often would play rowdy cockneys (as in Pack Up Your Troubles with The Ritz Brothers), and affable Englishmen (as in Tin Pan Alley and Terror by Night). He played a friendly bus conductor opposite Greer Garson in one of the opening scenes of Mrs. Miniver.

Billy Bevan died in 1957 in Escondido, California.

== Filmography ==
- Salome vs. Shenandoah (1919)
- Distilled Love (1920, Short)
- Married Life (1920) - Hospital Staff / Janitor (uncredited)
- Love, Honor and Behave (1920) - A Fake Lawyer
- A Small Town Idol (1921) - Director
- Home Talent (1921) - Minor Role (uncredited)
- On Patrol (1922) - star policeman then convict
- The Crossroads of New York (1922) - Press Agent
- The Extra Girl (1923) - Comedian
- The White Sin (1924) - Travers Dale
- One Spooky Night (1924) - Man in the Haunted House
- Flirty Four-Flushers (1926, Short) - Jerry Connors / Archibald De Shyster
- Easy Pickings (1927) - The Detective
- The Golf Nut (1927) - Billy Divott
- The Girl from Everywhere (1927) - Messenger
- Riley the Cop (1928) - Paris Cabman (uncredited)
- High Voltage (1929) - Gus (The Driver)
- Weak But Willing (1929) - George Downing
- The Trespasser (1929) - Reporter (uncredited)
- The Sky Hawk (1929) - Tom Berry
- Peacock Alley (1930) - Walter - Bell Captain
- Journey's End (1930) - 2nd Lt. Trotter
- Temptation (1930) - Sam
- For the Defense (1930) - Drunk (uncredited)
- Monte Carlo (1930) - Train Conductor (uncredited)
- For the Love o' Lil (1930) - Edward O. Walker
- Born to Love (1931) - Departing British Soldier (uncredited)
- The Spy (1931) - Minor Role (uncredited)
- Chances (1931)
- Transatlantic (1931) - Hodgkins
- Waterloo Bridge (1931) - Soldier on the Make (uncredited)
- The Silent Witness (1932) - Horace Ward
- Sky Devils (1932) - The Colonel
- Vanity Fair (1932) - Joseph Sedley
- Payment Deferred (1932) - Hammond
- Me and My Gal (1932) - Ashley (uncredited)
- Cavalcade (1933) - George Grainger
- Luxury Liner (1933) - Schultz
- Looking Forward (1933) - Mr. Barker, Night Watchman
- A Study in Scarlet (1933) - Will Swallow
- Peg o' My Heart (1933) - Detective #2 (uncredited)
- Midnight Club (1933) - Detective (uncredited)
- Too Much Harmony (1933) - Stage Director
- The Way to Love (1933) - M. Prial
- Alice in Wonderland (1933) - Two of Spades (uncredited)
- Caravan (1934) - Police Sergeant
- The Lost Patrol (1934) - Hale
- Stingaree (1934) - Mac
- Shock (1934) - Meadows
- One More River (1934) - Cloakroom Attendant
- Bulldog Drummond Strikes Back (1934) - Man in Hotel Room (uncredited)
- The Painted Veil (1934) - Bridegroom (scenes deleted)
- Limehouse Blues (1934) - Herb
- Mystery Woman (1935) - Jepson
- Vanessa: Her Love Story (1935) - Horse Auctioneer (uncredited)
- Black Sheep (1935) - Alfred
- Dressed to Thrill (1935) - Canadian Soldier (uncredited)
- The Last Outpost (1935) - Private Foster
- A Tale of Two Cities (1935) - Jerry Cruncher
- The Widow from Monte Carlo (1935) - Police Officer Watkins (uncredited)
- Song and Dance Man (1936) - Curtis
- Mr. Deeds Goes to Town (1936) - Cabby (uncredited)
- Champagne Charlie (1936) - Mr. Boswick - Ship Bartender (uncredited)
- Dracula's Daughter (1936) - Albert
- Private Number (1936) - Frederick
- Piccadilly Jim (1936) - Taxi Driver
- Lloyd's of London (1936) - Innkeeper
- God's Country and the Woman (1937) - Plug Hat
- Personal Property (1937) - Frank the Waiter (uncredited)
- Slave Ship (1937) - Atkins
- Another Dawn (1937) - Pvt. Hawkins
- The Sheik Steps Out (1937) - Munson
- The Wrong Road (1937) - McLean
- Bringing Up Baby (1938) - Johe - Bartender (uncredited)
- The Girl of the Golden West (1938) - Nick
- Blond Cheat (1938) - The Bartender (uncredited)
- The Young in Heart (1938) - Kennel Man (uncredited)
- Meet the Girls (1938) - Bartender (uncredited)
- Mysterious Mr. Moto (1938) - Customs Official (uncredited)
- Shadows Over Shanghai (1938) - Gallicuddy
- Arrest Bulldog Drummond (1938) - Aquarium Guard (uncredited)
- Up the River (1938) - Bartender (uncredited)
- A Christmas Carol (1938) - Street Watch Leader (uncredited)
- Let Freedom Ring (1939) - Cockney (uncredited)
- Captain Fury (1939) - Duffy
- Grand Jury Secrets (1939) - Masseur (uncredited)
- Pack Up Your Troubles (1939) - British Sergeant (uncredited)
- We Are Not Alone (1939) - Mr. Jones
- The Earl of Chicago (1940) - Guide
- The Invisible Man Returns (1940) - Jim (uncredited)
- Rebecca (1940) - Policeman (uncredited)
- The Long Voyage Home (1940) - Joe - Limehouse Barman (uncredited)
- Tin Pan Alley (1940) - Stage Doorman
- Scotland Yard (1941) - Porter (uncredited)
- Penny Serenade (1941) - McDougal (uncredited)
- One Night in Lisbon (1941) - Lord Fitzleigh's Aide (uncredited)
- Shining Victory (1941) - Chivers
- Dr. Jekyll and Mr. Hyde (1941) - Mr. Weller
- Suspicion (1941) - Ticket Taker (uncredited)
- Confirm or Deny (1941) - Mr. Bindle
- The Man Who Wouldn't Die (1942) - Phillips - the Butler
- This Above All (1942) - Farmer (uncredited)
- Mrs. Miniver (1942) - Bus Conductor (uncredited)
- Hi, Neighbor (1942) - Guest (uncredited)
- Counter-Espionage (1942) - George Barrow
- A Yank at Eton (1942) - Tour Guide (uncredited)
- I Married a Witch (1942) - Puritan Vendor (uncredited)
- London Blackout Murders (1943) - Air Raid Warden
- Forever and a Day (1943) - Wartime Cabby
- Young and Willing (1943) - Phillips
- Holy Matrimony (1943) - Cabby (uncredited)
- The Return of the Vampire (1943) - Horace - Civil Defense Worker (uncredited)
- Jane Eyre (1943) - Bookie (uncredited)
- The Lodger (1944) - Bartender (uncredited)
- Once Upon a Time (1944) - Patrol Cop-Driver (uncredited)
- The Invisible Man's Revenge (1944) - Sergeant
- The Pearl of Death (1944) - Constable (uncredited)
- National Velvet (1944) - Constable (uncredited)
- Tonight and Every Night (1945) - Cabbie (uncredited)
- The Picture of Dorian Gray (1945) - Malvolio Jones - Chairman
- Scotland Yard Investigator (1945) - Porter (uncredited)
- Terror by Night (1946) - Train Attendant
- Devotion (1946) - Mr. Ames (uncredited)
- Cluny Brown (1946) - Uncle Arn Porritt (uncredited)
- Moss Rose (1947) - White Horse Cabby (uncredited)
- Love from a Stranger (1947) - Taxi Driver (uncredited)
- It Had to Be You (1947) - Evans - the Butler
- The Swordsman (1948) - Old Andrew
- The Black Arrow (1948) - Dungeon Keeper
- Let's Live a Little (1948) - Morton (uncredited)
- The Secret Garden (1949) - Barney
- The Secret of St. Ives (1949) - Douglas (uncredited)
- That Forsyte Woman (1949) - Porter (uncredited)
- Tell It to the Judge (1949) - Winston - Kitty's Butler (uncredited)
- Fortunes of Captain Blood (1950) - Billy Bragg
- Rogues of Sherwood Forest (1950) - Will Scarlet
- Three Secrets (1950) - Ed Jackson (uncredited)
- Hans Christian Andersen (1952) - Town Councilman (uncredited)

== Gallery ==
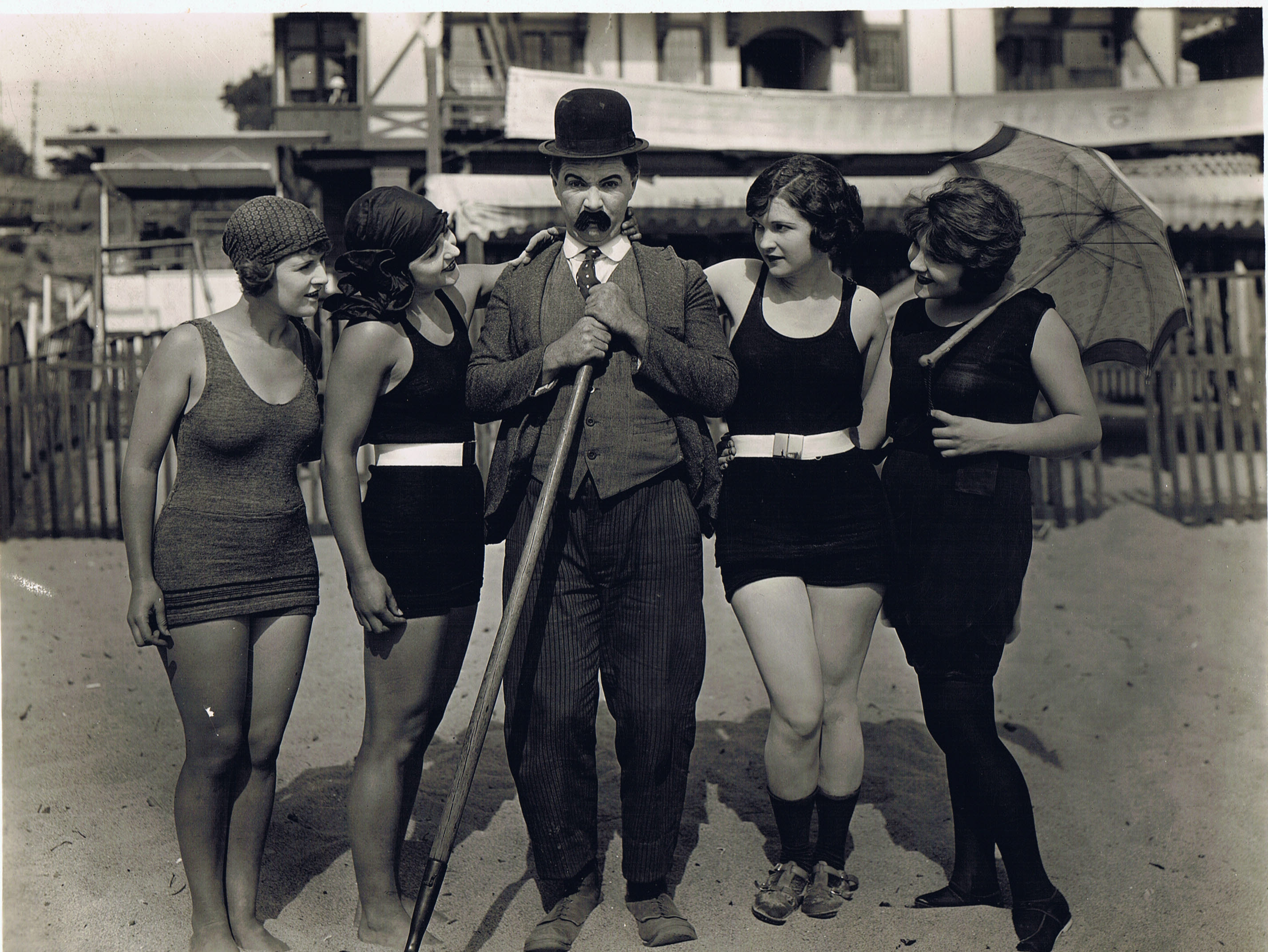
Billy Bevan and Mack Sennett Bathing Beauties, 1920s

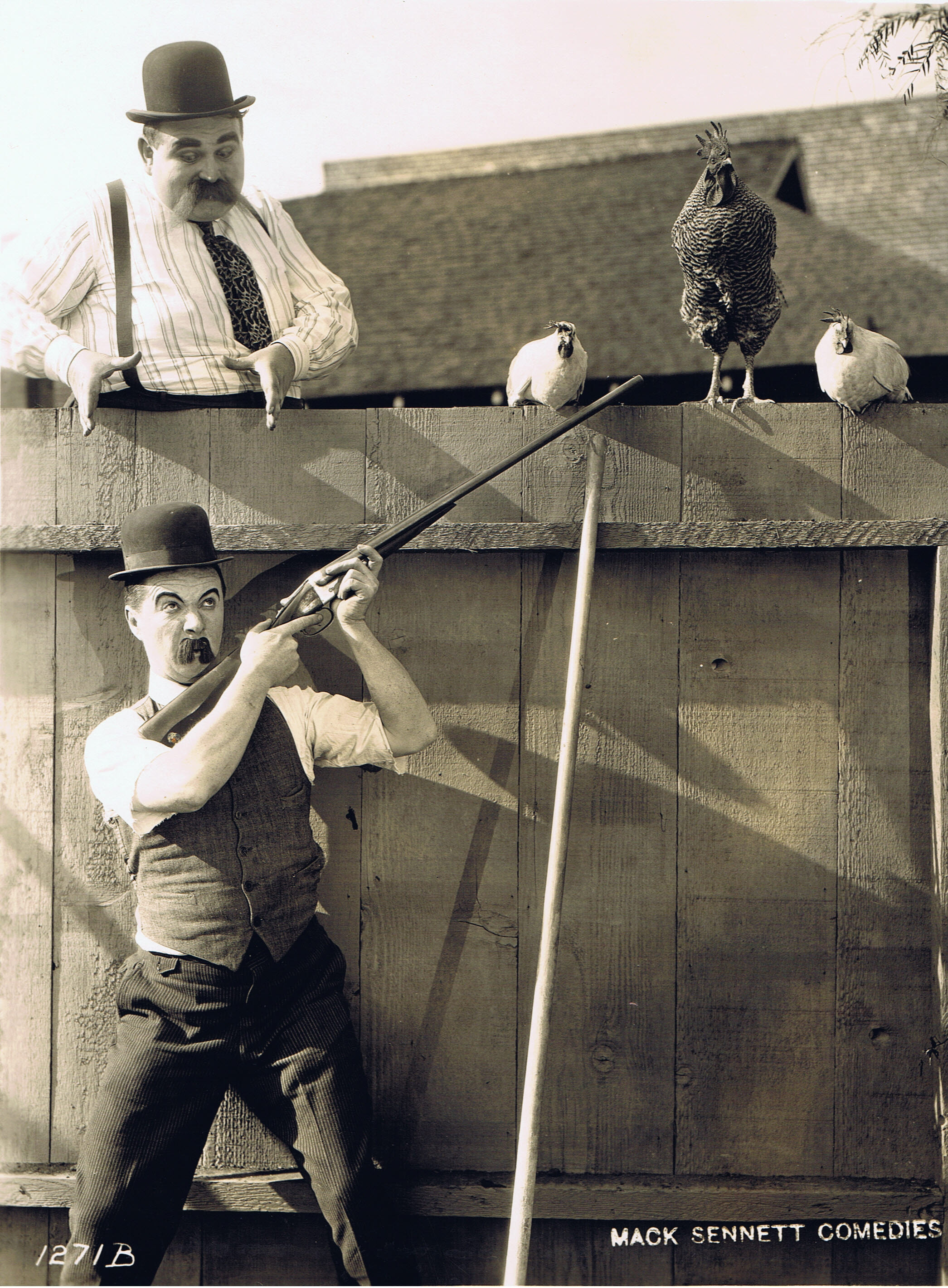
Scene from Oh! Daddy!, featuring Billy Bevan (bottom) and Mildred June (not shown), 1922
