= Alex Troffey =

Polish film editor

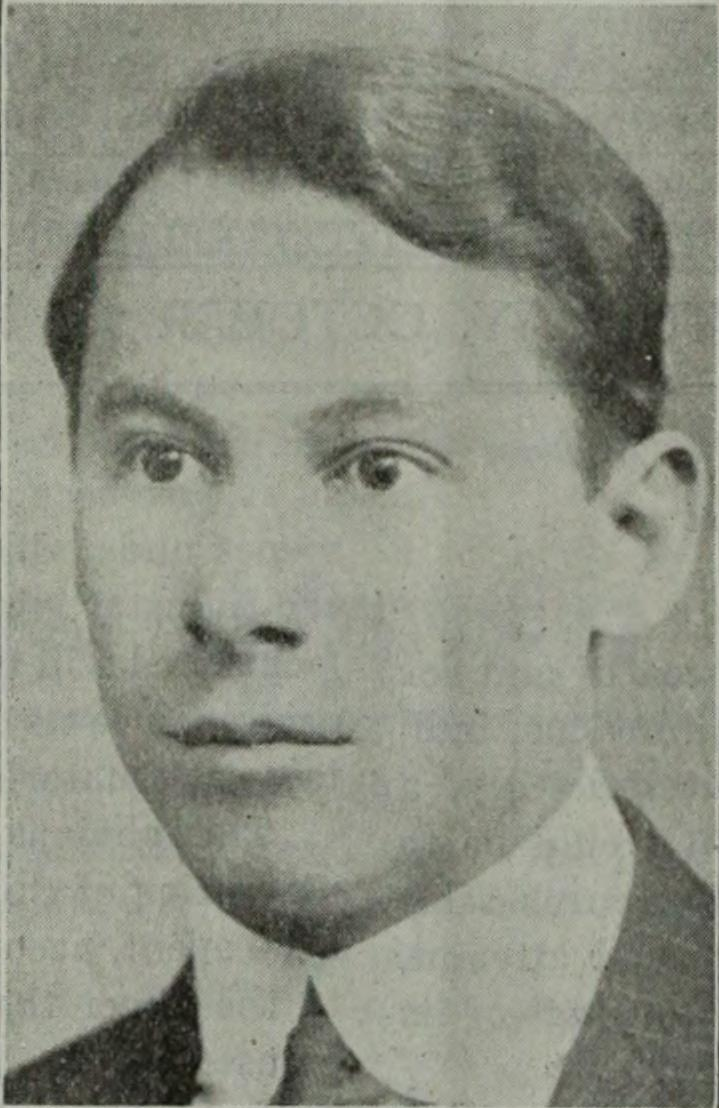
- Born: Alexander Trufimoff; 14 June 1895; Ostrołęka, Congress Poland, Russian Empire
- Died: 11 September 1978 (aged 83); Los Angeles, California, United States
- Other name: Alexander George Trufimoff
- Occupation: Editor
- Years active: 1918–1947 (film)

Alex Troffey (14 June 1895 – 11 September 1978) was a Polish-born film editor who immigrated to the United States in 1905.

== Selected filmography ==
- The Border Legion (1918)
- Home Sweet Home (1926)
- Fleetwing (1928)
- Hot Pepper (1933)
- Black Sheep (1935)
- Star for a Night (1936)
- Think Fast, Mr. Moto (1937)
- The Man Who Wouldn't Talk (1940)
- They Meet Again (1941)
- Whispering Ghosts (1942)

== Bibliography ==
- Hanke, Ken. Charlie Chan at the Movies: History, Filmography, and Criticism. McFarland, 1990.
