= The Mad Game =

1933 film by Irving Cummings

- Directed by: Irving Cummings
- Screenplay by: William Conselman; Henry Johnson
- Story by: William Conselman; Henry Johnson
- Produced by: William Fox
- Starring: Spencer Tracy; Claire Trevor; Ralph Morgan; J. Carrol Naish
- Cinematography: Arthur Charles Miller
- Distributed by: Fox Film Corporation
- Release date: October 27, 1933 (United States)
- Running time: 73 mins.
- Country: United States
- Language: English

The Mad Game is a 1933 American Pre-Code crime drama film starring Spencer Tracy and Claire Trevor and directed by Irving Cummings.

== Plot ==
An imprisoned bootlegger is recruited from incarceration to help capture his own gang after they kidnap the daughter of the judge who jailed him.

== Cast ==
- Spencer Tracy as Edward Carson
- Claire Trevor as Jane Lee
- Ralph Morgan as Judge Penfield
- Howard Lally as Thomas Penfield
- J. Carrol Naish as Chopper Allen
- John Miljan as William Bennett
- Matt McHugh as Butts McGee
- Kathleen Burke as Marilyn Kirk
- Mary Mason as Lila Penfield
- Willard Robertson as Warden
- John Davidson as Doctor
- Paul Fix as Lou
