= Boy of the Streets =

1937 American drama film directed by William Nigh

- Theatrical release poster
- Directed by: William Nigh
- Screenplay by: Gilson Brown; Scott Darling
- Story by: Rowland Brown
- Starring: Jackie Cooper; Maureen O'Connor; Kathleen Burke; Robert Emmett O'Connor; Marjorie Main; Matty Fain
- Cinematography: Gilbert Warrenton
- Edited by: Russell F. Schoengarth
- Production company: Monogram Pictures
- Distributed by: Monogram Pictures
- Release date: December 8, 1937
- Running time: 76 minutes
- Country: United States
- Language: English

Boy of the Streets is a 1937 American drama film directed by William Nigh and written by Gilson Brown and Scott Darling. The film stars Jackie Cooper, Maureen O'Connor, Kathleen Burke, Robert Emmett O'Connor, Marjorie Main and Matty Fain. The film was released on December 8, 1937, by Monogram Pictures.

== Cast ==
- Jackie Cooper as Chuck Brennan
- Maureen O'Connor as Nora
- Kathleen Burke as Julie Stone
- Robert Emmett O'Connor as Police Officer Rourke
- Marjorie Main as Mrs. Mary Brennan
- Matty Fain as Blackie Davis
- George Cleveland as Tim 'Flannel-Mouth' Farley
- Wild Bill Elliott as Dr. Allan
- Guy Usher as Fog Horn Brennan
- Paul White as Spike
