= The Last Outpost (1935 film) =

1935 adventure film by Charles Barton

- Cary Grant and Gertrude Michael in the DVD cover for The Last Outpost.
- Directed by: Charles Barton; Louis J. Gasnier
- Screenplay by: Charles Brackett; Frank Partos; Philip MacDonald
- Produced by: E. Lloyd Sheldon
- Starring: Cary Grant; Claude Rains; Gertrude Michael; Kathleen Burke; Colin Tapley; Billy Bevan
- Cinematography: Theodor Sparkuhl
- Edited by: Jack Dennis
- Music by: Bernhard Kaun; William E. Lynch; Milan Roder; Heinz Roemheld
- Production company: Paramount Pictures
- Distributed by: Paramount Pictures
- Release date: October 11, 1935
- Running time: 76 minutes
- Country: United States
- Language: English

The Last Outpost is a 1935 American adventure film directed by Charles Barton and Louis J. Gasnier and written by Charles Brackett, Frank Partos and Philip MacDonald. It is based on F. Britten Austin's novel The Drum. The film stars Cary Grant, Claude Rains, Gertrude Michael, Kathleen Burke, Colin Tapley, Margaret Swope and Billy Bevan. The film was released on October 11, 1935, by Paramount Pictures.

== Plot ==
In Kurdistan during World War I, Captain Michael Andrews is a British officer captured by Kurds, imprisoned, and awaiting execution. The local Turkish commander helps Andrews escape and confides that he is a British intelligence officer (initially "Smith," later named as John Stevenson) in disguise. The two set out to warn friendly villagers of a pending Kurdish attack. After a difficult river crossing, and after Andrews flirts with a married tribal woman, Stevenson returns to espionage. Andrews, who has hurt his leg, goes to Cairo for medical treatment. There, Andrews falls in love with his nurse, Rosemary Haydon, who ultimately refuses Andrews by saying that she is secretly married to a man who she had known briefly a few years before.

Andrews transfers to the Sudan, where his patrol takes over a fort after finding that its troops had been massacred. Meanwhile, Stevenson goes back to Haydon—revealed as his wife—who confesses her love for Andrews. Stevenson requests a transfer to the Sudan to confront Andrews. Shortly after Stevenson reaches the fort, thousands of African tribesman attack it. Realizing that a handful of men can't hold the fort, Andrews, Stevenson, and their troops set out over sand dunes and eventually enter the jungle with the tribesmen in hot pursuit. British troops appear out of nowhere, deus ex machina, defeat the tribesmen, and rescue Andrews. Stevenson, mortally wounded in the battle, dies a hero's death, presumably leaving Andrews free to marry widow Haydon.

== Cast ==
- Cary Grant as Captain Michael Andrews
- Claude Rains as John Stevenson
- Gertrude Michael as Rosemary Haydon
- Kathleen Burke as Ilya
- Colin Tapley as Lt. Prescott
- Billy Bevan as Cpl. Foster
- Georges Renavent as Turkish major
- Robert Adair as Sergeant in general's office
- Claude King as General
- Olaf Hytten as Doctor
- Frank Elliott as Colonel
- Nick Shaid as Haidar

== Production ==
=== Nomadic footage ===
The Last Outpost borrows stock footage from earlier productions, notably Merian C. Cooper's 1925 silent ethnographic documentary Grass—A Nation's Battle for Life. The spectacular river-crossing and mountain-climbing scenes are a genuine record, filmed by Cooper, of traditional Bakhtiari migrations in Iran.

== Critical response ==
Frank S. Nugent of the The New York Times described the film as "a well-made, if somewhat familiar, melodrama." He disagreed with publicity that marketed the film as "another Bengal Lancer", which he stated had been made for a male audience, while The Last Outpost, with the inclusion of a romantic subplot, was aimed at a female audience. He expounded on this point with the comment, "The Last Outpost is at its best during those spirited moments at the beginning and the end of the picture when Cary Grant and Claude Rains are upsetting the plans of the Turks or exchanging leaden compliments with the tribesmen. It bogs down—from a masculine viewpoint—for long minutes in between when Mr. Grant and Miss Michael go about the sober business of becoming romantically involved. It does seem, with all the drawing rooms available, that Paramount could have preserved the Sudan for the sterner things of life."

Writing for The Spectator in 1935, Graham Greene gave a mixed review, describing the first half-hour of the film as "remarkably good" and the remaining 40 minutes as "quite abysmally bad". Greene praised the direction and camerawork of the first part as employing a "fine vigour to present a subject which could not have been presented on the stage", and he praised the acting of both Rains and Grant. The second part of the film (after Grant's character descends the mountain pass to Cairo and Rain's character returns to fight the Kurds) Greene described as "padded out [...] by the addition of a more than usually stupid triangular melodrama of jealousy and last-minute rescue".

Variety provided a largely negative review, and described the film as "a crazy-quilt of melodrama, travelog [sic], history, jungle clips and whatnot." It said that although the "central idea of the story is simple and logical enough ... the route taken in fashioning the narrative gets more confusing and tiresome with each successive reel." Of the performances, it said, "To Cary Grant, Claude Rains and Gertrude Michael fall the assignment of giving life and conviction to the romantic segment of the plot. They all do well by their roles."

In their December, 1935 edition, Modern Screen gave the film a two-star review, and described it as "a western thriller done up in soldier suits."It went on to say that it had "all the action and every bit of the hocum which used to mark the horse operas of William S. Hart and Tom Mix … a first rate cast, including (Cary) Grant, Gertrude Michael and Claude Rains, is wasted on an outmoded story."
