= Navy Wife (1935 film) =

1935 film by Allan Dwan

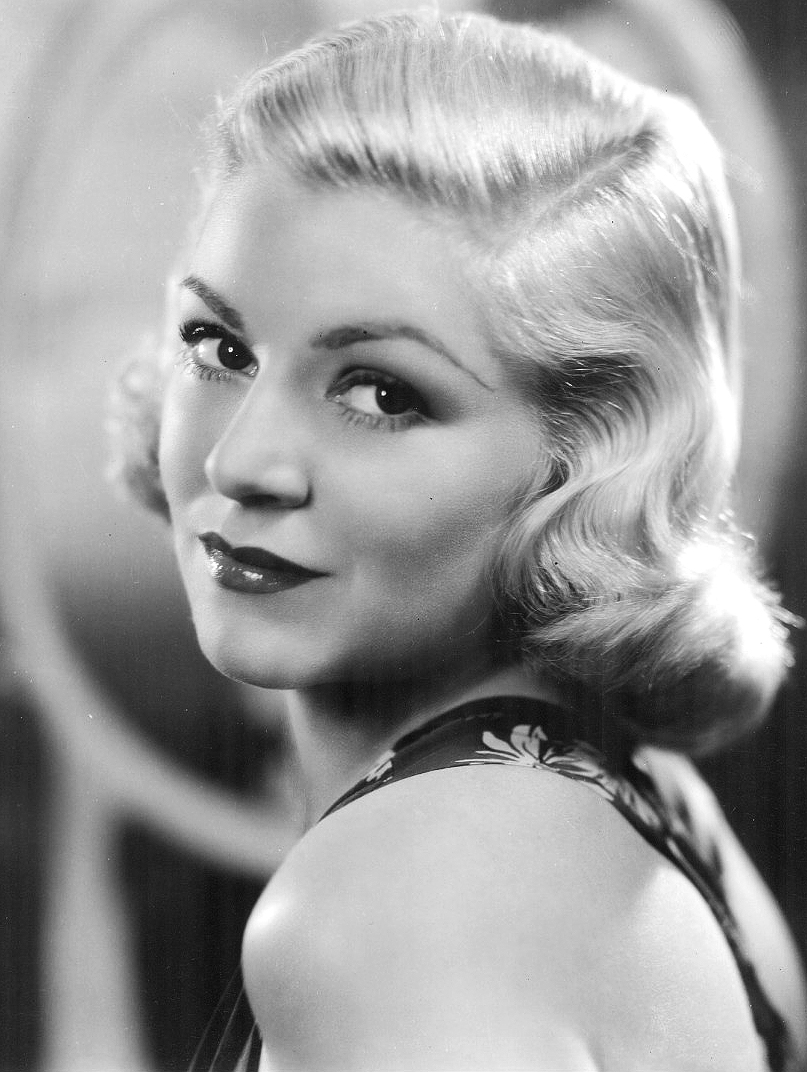
- Claire Trevor starred as Vicky Blake
- Directed by: Allan Dwan
- Screenplay by: Sonya Levien; Edward T. Lowe Jr.
- Based on: Beauty's Daughter by Kathleen Norris
- Produced by: Sol M. Wurtzel
- Starring: Claire Trevor; Ralph Bellamy; Jane Darwell; Warren Hymer; Ben Lyon; Kathleen Burke
- Cinematography: Rudolph Maté; John F. Seitz
- Edited by: Alfred DeGaetano
- Music by: David Buttolph; Hugo Friedhofer
- Production company: Fox Film Corporation
- Distributed by: 20th Century Fox
- Release date: November 29, 1935
- Running time: 69 minutes
- Country: United States
- Language: English

Navy Wife is a 1935 American drama film directed by Allan Dwan and written by Sonya Levien and Edward T. Lowe Jr. It is based on the 1935 novel Beauty's Daughter by Kathleen Norris. The film stars Claire Trevor, Ralph Bellamy, Jane Darwell, Warren Hymer, Ben Lyon and Kathleen Burke. The film was released on November 29, 1935, by 20th Century Fox.

== Plot ==
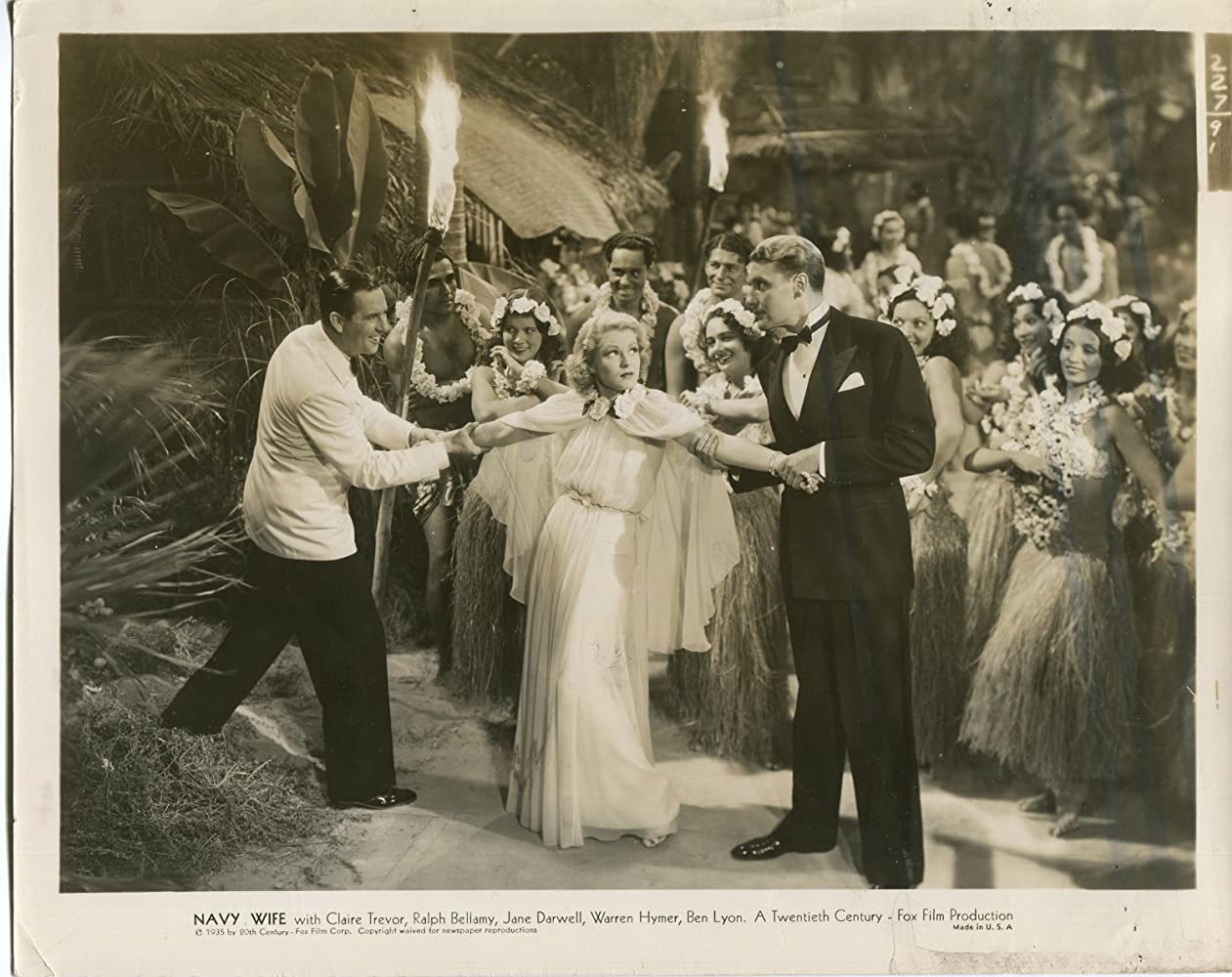
Ben Lyon, Claire Trevor and Ralph Bellamy in Navy Wife

When 50,000 sailors come to San Diego, California, many of them check into the U.S. Naval Hospital due to sustaining injuries on rented motorcycles. Sailor Butch pretends to have dislocated his hip, although he actually has a double-jointed hip, so that he will have a reason to see the nurse Vicky Blake. After meeting the newly hired chief surgeon, Vicky becomes attracted to Quentin. After Quentin leaves to see his daughter in Santa Barbara, California, Vicky comes to the conclusion that Quentin is not interested in her the same way due to not being over his wife's death. Through different circumstances, both Quentin and Vicky transfer to Honolulu, Hawaii. Doctor Pete Milford proposes to Vicky while on a boat, but Vicky says that she refuses due to her career. After Vicky tries to make Quentin jealous by pretending to date Pete, she eventually is honest with Quentin about her feelings because of Quentin's disabled daughter Susan who is in a wheelchair. While Vicky is helping Susan recuperate, Quentin becomes acquainted with Serena Morrison through Pete and the two of them spend time with each other for a few months. When Vicky comes back, with Susan who is now able to walk, Quentin visits Serena without telling Vicky that Serena called him to meet. After Pete tells Vicky how Quentin met Serena through him, the two of them get drunk together. Serena discovers that Quentin was leading her on to capture a spy ring that she was involved in, leading Serena to shoot Quentin. After Vicky finds out about the ordeal, she visits Quentin in his hospital room where the two embrace.

== Production and release ==
Allan Dwan said that the film had nothing from the novel. The Fox Film Corporation joined with Twentieth Century Pictures as the film was entering production in Hawaii. The film's exteriors were shot in Hawaii while a few scenes happened at the San Diego Naval Training Station Hospital. Ben Lyon was surprised about signing a contract for the film due to not having a lead role for a while. Navy Wife was the first film that deals with life as part of the Navy Nurse Corps and Medical Corps of the United States Navy. A short feature about the science behind manufacturing and a newsreel were shown alongside the film during its theatrical run.

== Reception ==
Variety said that the film was "likely to suffer" due to "coming at the tag end of a long flotilla of navy pictures" while praising the performances of the main cast. The Film Daily wrote that it has "a fine cast in a logically developed story" and that "the name of Kathleen Norris as author should mean something". The Paducah Sun-Democrat said that the film has "one of the most startling surprise climaxes ever conceived." The St. Louis Star and Times said that "scenes on board a passenger liner" were "unusual".
