= Duncan Cramer =

American cinematic art director (1901–1980)

- Born: William Duncan Cramer; June 22, 1901; Logansport, Indiana, United States
- Died: February 14, 1980 (aged 78); Orange County, California, United States
- Occupation: Art Director
- Years active: 1929 - 1971 (film & TV)
- Spouse: Helen A. Myron

Duncan Cramer (1901–1980) was an American motion picture art director active from 1929 to 1971. He headed the Art Department of 20th Century Fox Studios, and is credited for the sets of more than a hundred films and television series.

Cramer and David S. Hall were the art directors for the 1935 film Dante's Inferno. In 2014, the film was shown and discussed in a videorecorded program of the Art Directors Guild. Cramer was nominated twice for an Emmy Award for the television program Four Star Playhouse. Cramer's papers are in the collection of the Margaret Herrick Library.

== Selected filmography ==
- The Silent Witness (1932)
- Black Sheep (1935)
- The Great Hotel Murder (1935)
- Star for a Night (1936)
- Charlie Chan at the Circus (1936)
