= Alan Bryman =

British social scientist

Alan Bryman (1947–2017) was Professor of Organisational and Social research at the University of Leicester, prior to this Bryman spent 31 years at Loughborough University.

== Academic career ==
He is best known for three main areas of work. Bryman has long been associated with research methods and in particular the use of mixed methods; this led to him publishing the book Social Research Methods (now in the 6th Edition) and Quantitative Data Analysis with SPSS 12 and 13: A Guide for Social Scientists with Duncan Cramer. His Quantity and Quality In Social Research (1988) is yet another significant contribution in the field of research methods.

Bryman has also published widely on leadership, organisational culture and management. His more recent work focuses upon contemporary society, with Bryman considering the influence of Disney and McDonald's on modern society.
