= Claire Trevor =

American actress (1910–2000)

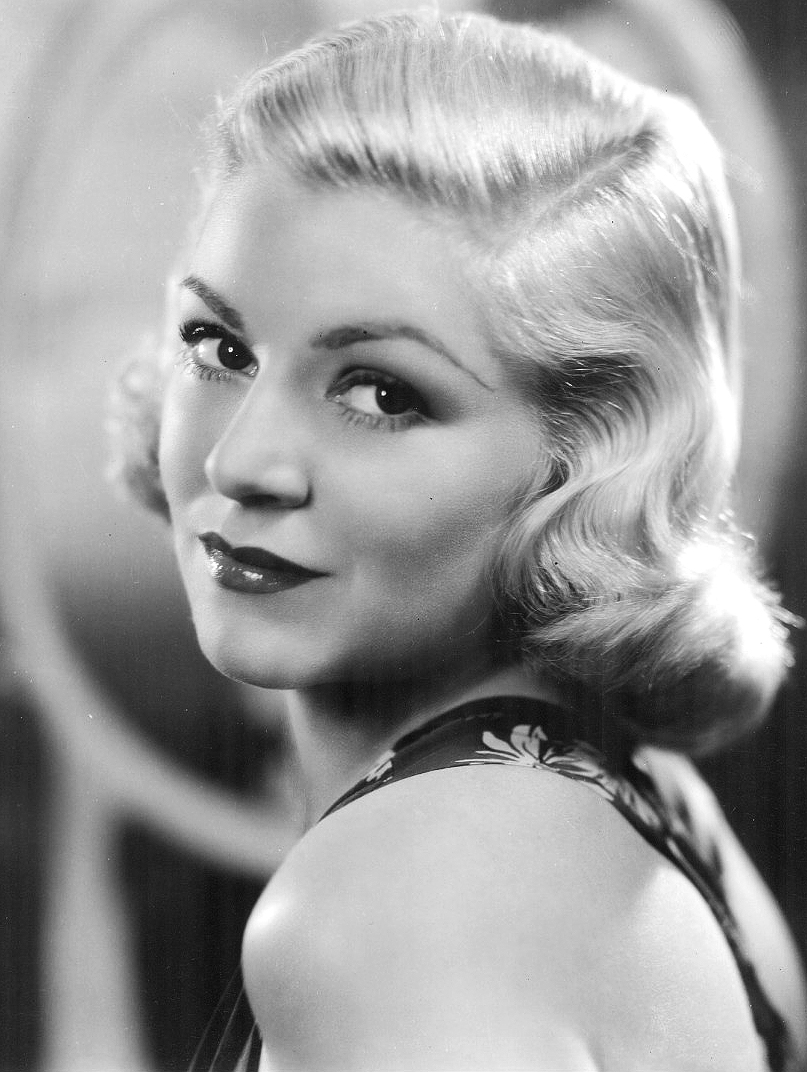
- Trevor in the 1930s
- Born: Claire Wemlinger; March 8, 1910; New York City, NY, U.S.
- Died: April 8, 2000 (aged 90); Newport Beach, California, U.S.
- Occupation: Actress
- Years active: 1929–1987
- Known for: Key Largo; Dead End; The High and the Mighty
- Spouses: Clark Andrews (m. 1938; div. 1942); Cylos William Dunsmore (m. 1943; div. 1947); Milton H. Bren (m. 1948; died 1979)
- Children: 1
- Awards: Academy Award for Best Supporting Actress (1948); Emmy Award (1957)

Claire Trevor (née Wemlinger; March 8, 1910 – April 8, 2000) was an American actress. She appeared in 65 feature films from 1933 to 1982, winning the Academy Award for Best Supporting Actress for her role in Key Largo (1948), and received nominations for her roles in The High and the Mighty (1954) and Dead End (1937). Trevor received top billing, ahead of John Wayne, for Stagecoach (1939).

== Early life ==
Trevor was born on March 8, 1910, in Bensonhurst, Brooklyn, New York City, the only child of Noel Wemlinger, a Fifth Avenue merchant tailor (of French birth but German ancestry), and his wife, Benjamina ("Betty"), who was of Irish birth. For many years, her year of birth was misreported as 1909, which is why her age at the time of her death was initially given as 91, not 90.

She was raised in New York City, and from 1923 on, in Larchmont, New York. She attended Mamaroneck High School, where she acted in school plays and won a school public speaking contest. She graduated in 1928.

== Career ==
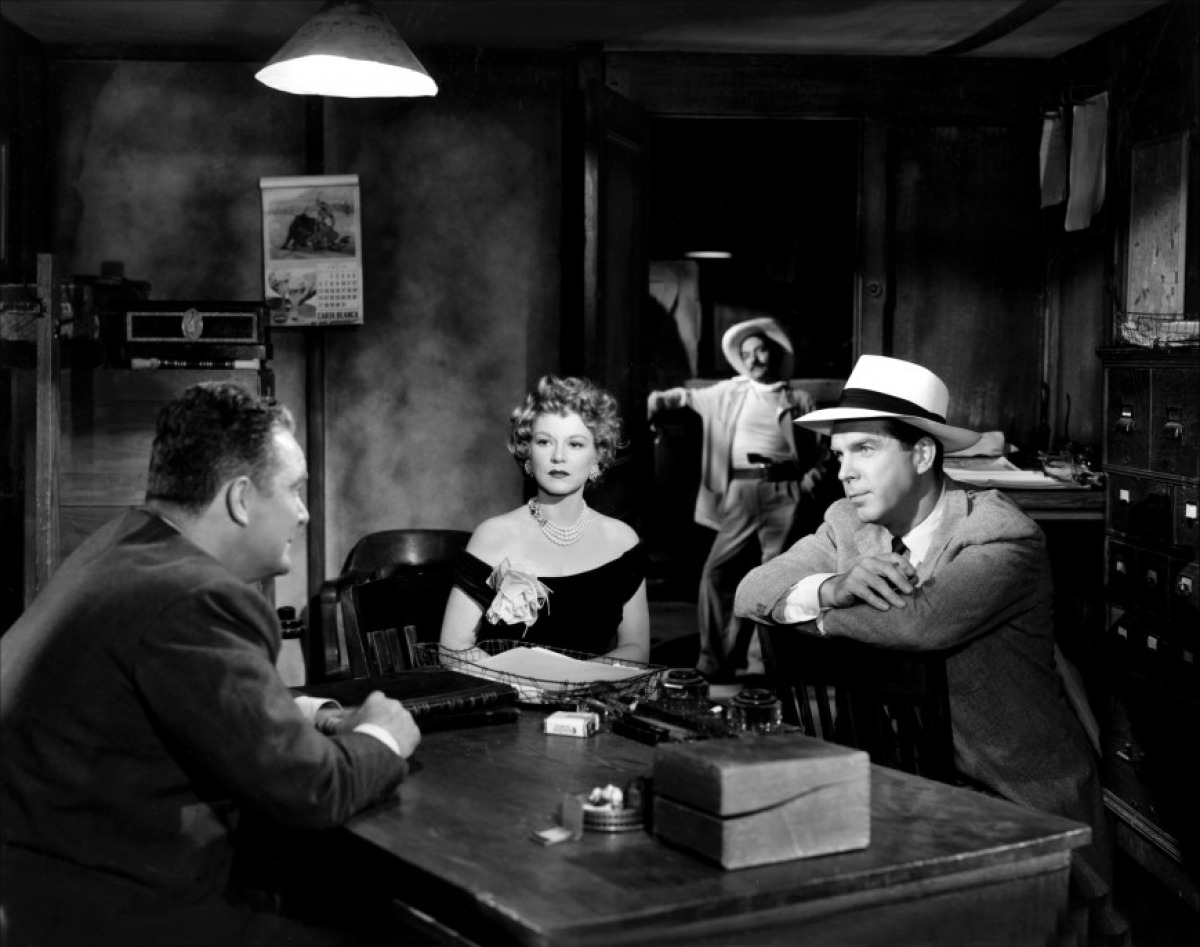
With Fred MacMurray (r.) in Borderline (1950)

After completing high school, Trevor began her career with six months of art classes at Columbia University and six months at the American Academy of Dramatic Arts. She made her stage debut in the summer of 1929 with a repertory company in Ann Arbor, Michigan. She subsequently returned to New York, where she appeared in a number of Brooklyn-filmed Vitaphone short films and performed in summer stock theatre. In 1932, she starred on Broadway as the female lead in Whistling in the Dark.

Trevor made her film debut in Jimmy and Sally (1933), a film originally written for the popular screen duo of James Dunn and Sally Eilers. When Eilers declined the role, Trevor was cast in her place. From 1933 to 1938, Trevor starred in 29 films, often having either the lead role or the role of heroine. In 1937, she was the second lead actress (after top-billed Sylvia Sidney) in Dead End, with Humphrey Bogart, which led to her nomination for Best Supporting Actress. From 1937 to 1940, she appeared with Edward G. Robinson in the popular radio series Big Town, while continuing to make movies. In the early 1940s, she also was a regular on The Old Gold Don Ameche Show on the NBC Red Radio Network, starring with Ameche in presentations of plays by Mark Hellinger. In 1939, she was well established as a solid leading lady. One of her more memorable performances during this period includes the Western Stagecoach (1939).

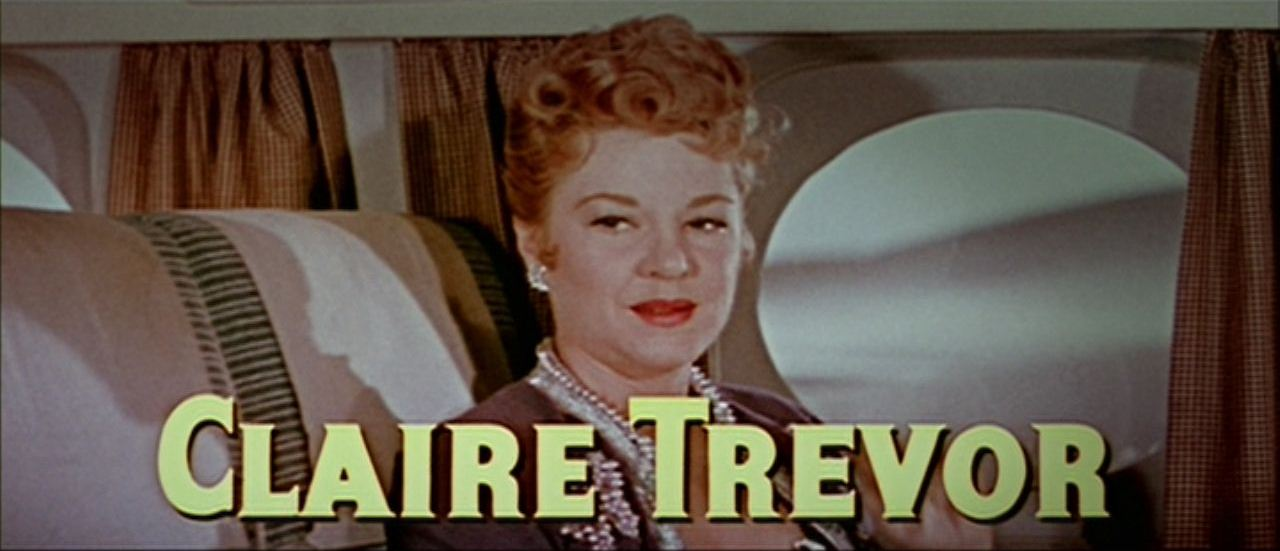
Trevor in The High and the Mighty (1954), which earned her an Academy Award nomination for Best Supporting Actress

Two of Trevor's most memorable roles were opposite Dick Powell in Murder, My Sweet (1944) and with Lawrence Tierney in Born to Kill (1947). In Key Largo (1948), Trevor played Gaye Dawn, a washed-up, alcoholic nightclub singer and gangster's moll. For that role, she won the Academy Award for Best Supporting Actress. Her third and final Oscar nomination was for her performance in The High and the Mighty (1954). In 1957, she won an Emmy for her role in the Producers' Showcase episode titled "Dodsworth". Trevor moved into supporting roles in the 1950s, with her appearances becoming very rare after the mid-1960s. She played Charlotte, the mother of Kay (Sally Field) in Kiss Me Goodbye (1982). Her final television role was for the 1987 television film, Norman Rockwell's Breaking Home Ties. Trevor made a guest appearance at the 70th Academy Awards in 1998.

== Personal life and death ==
Trevor married Clark Andrews, director of her radio show, in 1938; they divorced four years later. She married Navy Lieutenant Cylos William Dunsmore in 1943. Their son was her only child. The couple divorced in 1947. The next year, Trevor married Milton Bren, a film producer with two sons from a previous marriage, and moved to Newport Beach, California.

In 1978, Trevor's son died in the crash of PSA Flight 182, and this was followed by the death of her husband Milton from a brain tumor in 1979. Devastated by these losses, she returned to Manhattan for some years, living in a Fifth Avenue apartment and taking a few acting roles amid a busy social life. She eventually returned to California, where she remained for the rest of her life, becoming a generous supporter of the arts.

Trevor supported Thomas Dewey in the 1944 United States presidential election.

On April 8, 2000, Trevor died at a hospital in Newport Beach, California, at age 90. For her contribution to the motion picture industry, she has a star on the Hollywood Walk of Fame at 6933 Hollywood Boulevard.

== Legacy ==
The Claire Trevor School of the Arts at the University of California, Irvine, was named in Trevor's honor. Her Oscar and Emmy statuettes are on display in the Arts Plaza, next to the Claire Trevor Theatre.

According to her biography on the website of Claire Trevor School of the Arts, "Trevor's acting career spanned more than seven decades and included successes in stage, radio, television, and film...[She] often played the hard-boiled blonde, and every conceivable type of 'bad girl' role."

== Filmography ==
Film
Year	Title	Role	Notes
1933	Life in the Raw	Judy Halloway	Film debut
1933	Jimmy and Sally	Sally Johnson	
1933	The Mad Game	Jane Lee	
1933	The Last Trail	Patricia Carter	
1934	Elinor Norton	Elinor Norton	
1934	Baby Take a Bow	Kay Ellison	
1934	Wild Gold	Jerry Jordan	
1934	Hold That Girl	Tonie Bellamy	
1935	Spring Tonic	Betty Ingals	
1935	Black Sheep	Jeanette Foster	
1935	My Marriage	Carol Barton	
1935	Navy Wife	Vicky Blake	
1935	Dante's Inferno	Betty McWade	
1936	Career Woman	Carroll Aiken	
1936	Star for a Night	Nina Lind	
1936	To Mary – with Love	Kitty Brant	
1936	Human Cargo	Bonnie Brewster	
1936	Song and Dance Man	Julia Carroll	
1936	15 Maiden Lane	Jane Martin	
1937	Big Town Girl	Fay Loring	
1937	Second Honeymoon	Marcia	
1937	One Mile from Heaven	Lucy 'Tex' Warren	
1937	King of Gamblers	Dixie Moore	
1937	Time Out for Romance	Barbara Blanchard	
1937	Dead End	Francey	Nominated—Academy Award for Best Supporting Actress
1938	Five of a Kind	Christine Nelson	
1938	Valley of the Giants	Lee Roberts	
1938	Walking Down Broadway	Joan Bradley	
1938	The Amazing Dr. Clitterhouse	Jo Keller	
1939	Stagecoach	Dallas	
1939	I Stole a Million	Laura Benson	
1939	Allegheny Uprising	Janie MacDougall	
1940	Dark Command	Miss Mary Cloud	
1941	Texas	'Mike' King	
1941	Honky Tonk	'Gold Dust' Nelson	
1942	The Adventures of Martin Eden	Connie Dawson	
1942	Crossroads	Michelle Allaine	
1942	Street of Chance	Ruth Dillon	
1943	The Woman of the Town	Dora Hand	
1943	Good Luck, Mr. Yates	Ruth Jones	
1943	The Desperadoes	Countess Maletta	
1944	Murder, My Sweet	Mrs. Helen Grayle	
1945	Johnny Angel	Lilah 'Lily' Gustafson	
1946	The Bachelor's Daughters	Cynthia	
1946	Crack-Up	Terry Cordell	
1947	Born to Kill	Helen Trent	
1948	Raw Deal	Pat Cameron	
1948	The Velvet Touch	Marian Webster	
1948	The Babe Ruth Story	Claire (Hodgson) Ruth	
1948	Key Largo	Gaye Dawn	Academy Award for Best Supporting Actress
1949	The Lucky Stiff	Marguerite Seaton	
1950	Borderline	Madeleine Haley, aka Gladys LaRue	
1951	Best of the Badmen	Lily	
1951	Hard, Fast and Beautiful	Millie Farley	
1952	Stop, You're Killing Me	Nora Marko	
1952	My Man and I	Mrs. Ansel Ames	
1952	Hoodlum Empire	Connie Williams	
1953	The Stranger Wore a Gun	Josie Sullivan	
1954	The High and the Mighty	May Holst	Nominated—Academy Award for Best Supporting Actress
1955	Man Without a Star	Idonee	
1955	Lucy Gallant	Lady MacBeth	
1956	The Mountain	Marie	
1958	Marjorie Morningstar	Rose Morgenstern	
1962	Two Weeks in Another Town	Clara Kruger	
1963	The Stripper	Helen Baird	
1965	How to Murder Your Wife	Edna	
1967	The Cape Town Affair	Sam Williams	
1982	Kiss Me Goodbye	Charlotte Banning	Final film role
Television
Year	Title	Role	Notes
1953-1954	The Ford Television Theatre	Nora Hale/Felicia Crandell	2 episodes
1954-1955	Lux Video Theatre	Ellen Creed/Mary Scott	2 episodes Nominated—Primetime Emmy Award for Best Actress in a Single Performance
1955	General Electric Theater	Cora Leslie	Season 2 Episode 15: Foggy Night
1956	Schlitz Playhouse of Stars	Mary Hunter	Season 5 Episode 15: Fool Proof
1956	Producers' Showcase	Fran Dodsworth	Season 2 Episode 10: Dodsworth; Primetime Emmy Award for Best Single Performance by an Actress
1956-1961	Alfred Hitchcock Presents	Mary Prescott/Mrs. Meade	2 episodes
1957	Playhouse 90	Elizabeth Owen	Season 1 Episode 28: If You Knew Elizabeth
1959	Westinghouse Desilu Playhouse	Savannah Brown	Season 1 Episode 11: Happy Hill
1959	Wagon Train	C.L. Harding	Season 3 Episode 3: The C.L. Harding Story
1959	The Untouchables	Kate Clark 'Ma' Barker	Season 1 Episode 2: Ma Barker and Her Boys
1961	The Investigators	Kitty Harper	Season 1 Episode 3: New Sound for the Blues
1962	Dr. Kildare	Veronica Johnson, Nurse	Season 2 Episode 12: The Bed I've Made
1983	The Love Boat	Nancy Fairchild	Season 7 Episode 13: The Misunderstanding/Love Below Decks/The End is Near
1987	Murder, She Wrote	Judith Harlan	Season 4 Episode 3: Witness for the Defense
1987	Breaking Home Ties	Grace Porter	Television film

== Radio appearances ==
Year	Program	Episode/source
1946-1949	Suspense	2 episodes
1946	Reader's Digest – Radio Edition	Two for a Penny
1952	Hollywood Star Playhouse	Father's Day
1954	Lux Radio Theatre	Mildred Pierce
