= Fugitive Road =

1934 film by Frank R. Strayer

- Wera Engels and Erich von Stroheim
- Directed by: Frank R. Strayer
- Written by: Charles Belden; Robert Ellis
- Produced by: Maury M. Cohen
- Starring: Erich von Stroheim; Wera Engels; Leslie Fenton
- Cinematography: M.A. Anderson
- Edited by: Roland D. Reed
- Production company: Invincible Pictures
- Distributed by: Chesterfield Pictures
- Release date: August 22, 1934
- Running time: 69 minutes
- Country: United States
- Language: English

Fugitive Road is a 1934 American comedy drama film directed by Frank R. Strayer and starring Erich von Stroheim, Wera Engels and Leslie Fenton. It is set a border post in Austria following World War I. A variety of different people trying to cross the border end up stranded there, including an American gangster and a naïve young Russian woman hoping to sail to New York to join her brother.

It was shot at the Universal Studios with sets designed by the art director Edward C. Jewell.

== Cast ==
- Erich von Stroheim as Hauptmann Oswald Von Traunsee
- Wera Engels as Sonya Valinoff
- Leslie Fenton as Frank Riker
- George Humbert as Papa Vinocchio
- Hank Mann as Johann, Traunsee's orderly
- Harry Holman as Burgomaster
- Ferdinand Schumann-Heink as Doctor
- Michael Visaroff as Police capt. with moustache
- Wilhelm von Brincken as Lieutenant Berne
- Harry Allen as Herbert Smythe, ambulance driver
- Anna Demetrio as Mama Vinocchio
- Leonid Kinskey as Nicholas Petrovich, tall smuggler
- Florence Enright as Burgomaster's Wife
- Harry Schultz as Sergeant
- Edith Kingdon as Tourist
- Vangie Beilby as Tourist
- Hans Fuerberg as Second Lieutenant

== Bibliography ==
- Michael R. Pitts. Poverty Row Studios, 1929–1940: An Illustrated History of 55 Independent Film Companies, with a Filmography for Each. McFarland & Company, 2005.
