= Happiness C.O.D. =

1935 film by Charles Lamont

- Directed by: Charles Lamont
- Written by: Robert Ellis; Helen Logan
- Produced by: George R. Batcheller
- Starring: Maude Eburne; Donald Meek; Irene Ware
- Cinematography: M.A. Anderson
- Edited by: Roland D. Reed
- Production company: Chesterfield Pictures
- Distributed by: Chesterfield Pictures
- Release date: September 10, 1935
- Running time: 69 minutes
- Country: United States
- Language: English

Happiness C.O.D. is a 1935 American romantic comedy film directed by Charles Lamont and starring Maude Eburne, Donald Meek and Irene Ware. It was produced and distributed by the independent Chesterfield Pictures shortly before it was merged into Republic Pictures.

== Plot ==
When meek widower Thomas F. Sherridan, a construction engineer and owner of the Continental Construction Co., receives a telegram from his eldest son Ken informing him of his impending visit home, he promptly organizes a family reunion. Tom's sister Addie, who raised his three children and still manages his household, prepares a special dinner to celebrate Ken's homecoming. Ken, an architect "with new ideas" shows up with a mustache and a new girl friend, department store heiress Beatrice Manning, and announces that he has quit his job. When younger brother Larry and his sister Carroll arrive, the three siblings make plans to dine out, thoughtlessly leaving Tom and Aunt Addie behind. Once alone, Tom reveals to Addie that he is nearly bankrupt, in part because his extravagant offspring have always charged their various purchases to his account. Addie disapproves of this practice and also of Carroll's boyfriend, Jim Martin, who has been separated from his wife since she became an invalid after being seriously injured in a car accident while out with another man. Shortly after his arrival home, Ken, while dining with Beatrice and her father, sees Carroll and Jim together, and later, he tells Carroll that Jim isn't good enough for her.

Meanwhile, Tom insists on keeping his financial woes a secret from his family, and he is harassed by sleazy businessman Lester Walsh, holder of the $20,000 mortgage on Tom's house. Walsh attempts to bribe Tom into approving the use of an inexpensive and inferior cement for the construction of a hospital in which Walsh has an interest. Addie finally tells Ken, Larry and Carroll how dire their father's financial situation is, and realizing the error of their ways, they all resolve to help. Carroll offers to wed Jim in exchange for $20,000, but he refuses, saying that such an arrangement would spoil their relationship. Addie, who has been courted for several years by Sam Townsend, offers him her hand, and he gladly accepts. The Reverend Huxley, an old friend of Addie's, decides to adopt one of Ken's avant-garde designs, previously rejected by the Manning Department Store, for his new tabernacle, a project on which Tom, Ken and Sam are to be partners. The only dark cloud on the horizon is a series of armed robberies in the locale, which Addie fears may have been committed by Larry, who once bragged about owning a gun; however, it is soon discovered that Larry has sold his gun and car and is working as a soda jerk in order to help his father. The balance of the Sherridans' mortgage is mysteriously paid off, and Carroll soon realizes that the anonymous benefactor is none other than Jim, whose wife has recently died. A grateful Ken invites Jim to a celebration at the Sherridan home as he eagerly begins the design of the future house for the newly united family.

== Cast ==
- Maude Eburne as Aunt Addie
- Donald Meek as Thomas Sherridan
- Irene Ware as Carroll Sherridan
- William Bakewell as Ken Sherridan
- Polly Ann Young as Eleanor
- Lona Andre as Beatrice Manning
- Frank Coghlan Jr. as Larry Sherridan
- Malcolm McGregor as Jim Martin
- Edwin Maxwell as Lester Walsh
- Robert McKenzie as Sam Townsend
- Fred Sumner as Mr. Manning
- Richard Carlyle as Rev. Huxley
- John Dilson as Snyder

== Bibliography ==
- Michael R. Pitts. Poverty Row Studios, 1929–1940: An Illustrated History of 55 Independent Film Companies, with a Filmography for Each. McFarland & Company, 2005.
