= The Dark Hour (1936 film) =

1936 film by Charles Lamont

- Hedda Hopper and Irene Ware
- Directed by: Charles Lamont
- Written by: Ewart Adamson (writer); Sinclair Gluck (novel The Last Trap)
- Produced by: George R. Batcheller
- Starring: See below
- Cinematography: M.A. Anderson
- Edited by: Roland D. Reed
- Production company: Chesterfield Pictures
- Distributed by: Chesterfield Pictures
- Release date: February 18, 1936
- Running time: 64 minutes
- Country: United States
- Language: English

The Dark Hour is a 1936 American film directed by Charles Lamont.

== Plot ==
When Elsa Carson's (Irene Ware) Uncle, Henry Carson (William V. Mong), is found murdered there is no shortage of suspects. To start with these include her other Uncle, Charles Carson (Hobart Bosworth), her fiancé, Jim Landis (Ray Walker), who is investigating the case; her Aunt, Mrs. Tallman (Hedda Hopper); and Foot, the Butler (E.E. Clive).

Elsa also doesn't know that retired Police Detective, Paul Bernard (Berton Churchill), has been on the trail of her Uncle Charles and the Butler for years, or that others might have their own motives for the murder.

Things then start to look bleak for Elsa when the murder weapon and a disguise are found in her room.

=== Differences from novel ===
Ewart Adamson based the screenplay on the 1928 novel The Last Trap, by American mystery writer Sinclair Gluck. The working title for the film was "The Last Trap".

The film omits many details from the novel. As Retired Police Detective Paul Bernard (Berton Churchill), admits to his young protégé, Jim Landis (Ray Walker), he only moved to the neighbourhood to gather evidence against Elsa's (Irene Ware) Uncle Charles Carson (Hobart Bosworth); and finally caught him in “The Last Trap” after a year.

== Cast ==
- Ray Walker as Jim Landis
- Berton Churchill as Paul Bernard
- Irene Ware as Elsa Carson
- Hobart Bosworth as Charles Carson
- Hedda Hopper as Mrs. Tallman
- E. E. Clive as Foot, the Butler
- Harold Goodwin as Peter Blake
- William V. Mong as Henry Carson
- Michael Mark as Arthur Bell
- John St. Polis as Dr. Munro
- Miki Morita as Choong
- Aggie Herring as Mrs. Dubbin
