= Sons of Steel (1934 film) =

1934 film by Charles Lamont

- Directed by: Charles Lamont
- Written by: Charles Belden
- Produced by: Lon Young (producer)
- Starring: See below
- Cinematography: M.A. Anderson
- Edited by: Roland D. Reed
- Production company: Chesterfield Pictures
- Distributed by: Chesterfield Pictures
- Release date: December 15, 1934
- Running time: 65 minutes
- Country: United States
- Language: English

Sons of Steel is a 1934 American film directed by Charles Lamont.

== Cast ==
- Charles Starrett as Phillip Mason Chadburne
- Polly Ann Young as Rose Mason
- William Bakewell as Roland Chadburne
- Walter Walker as John Chadburne
- Holmes Herbert as Curtis Chadburne
- Richard Carlyle as Tom Mason
- Florence Roberts as Sarah Mason
- Aileen Pringle as Enid Chadburne
- Adolph Milar as Stanislaus
- Edgar Norton as Higgins
- Barbara Bedford as Miss Peters
- Tom Ricketts as Williams
- Frank LaRue as Mike - the Foreman
- Al Thompson as Carson
- Harry Semels as Ryan
- Lloyd Ingraham as Draftsman
- Edward LeSaint as Mr. Herman
