= Edward C. Jewell =

American art director

- Born: January 5, 1894; Pontiac, Michigan, United States
- Died: September 25, 1963 (aged 69); Los Angeles, California, United States
- Other names: Edward Jewell, Ed Jewell
- Occupation: Art Director
- Years active: 1927–1963 (film)

Edward C. Jewell (1894–1963) was an American art director who worked on the sets of over a hundred and fifty film productions during his career. He worked for a variety of studios including Columbia Pictures in the 1930s and Producers Releasing Corporation in the 1940s, and along with Dave Milton he is one of the best known set designers for second features. Earlier in his career he was part of the design team which worked on Cecil B. DeMille's 1927 epic The King of Kings.

== Selected filmography ==
- The King of Kings (1927)
- His Dog (1927)
- Craig's Wife (1928)
- Captain Swagger (1928)
- Sal of Singapore (1928)
- Marked Money (1928)
- The Spieler (1928)
- Strange Cargo (1929)
- His First Command (1929)
- Oh, Yeah! (1929)
- The Flying Fool (1929)
- The Trespasser (1929)
- The Squealer (1930)
- Ladies Must Play (1930)
- Officer O'Brien (1930)
- Dirigible (1931)
- Ten Cents a Dance (1931)
- The Secrets of Wu Sin (1932)
- Rainbow Over Broadway (1933)
- By Appointment Only (1933)
- Goodbye Love (1933)
- On the Stroke of Nine (1933)
- Fugitive Road (1934)
- False Pretenses (1935)
- The Lady in Scarlet (1935)
- Death from a Distance (1935)
- In Paris, A.W.O.L. (1936)
- Murder at Glen Athol (1936)
- In His Steps (1936)
- Ellis Island (1936)
- Battle of Greed (1937)
- Rebellious Daughters (1938)
- Commandos Strike at Dawn (1942)
- Good Luck, Mr. Yates (1943)
- Shadow of Terror (1945)
- Dangerous Intruder (1945)
- Counter-Attack (1945)
- Secrets of a Sorority Girl (1945)
- God's Country (1946)
- Philo Vance's Secret Mission (1947)
- Lady at Midnight (1948)
- Gunfight at Comanche Creek (1963)

== Bibliography ==
- Michael L. Stephens. Art Directors in Cinema: A Worldwide Biographical Dictionary. McFarland, 1998.
