= Twin Husbands =

1933 film by Frank R. Strayer

- Directed by: Frank R. Strayer
- Written by: Robert Ellis (original story); Anthony Coldeway (screenplay)
- Produced by: Maury M. Cohen (producer)
- Cinematography: M.A. Anderson
- Edited by: Roland D. Reed
- Production company: Invincible Pictures
- Distributed by: Chesterfield Pictures
- Release date: November 30, 1933
- Running time: 68 minutes
- Country: United States
- Language: English

Twin Husbands is a 1933 American Pre-Code film directed by Frank R. Strayer.

== Plot ==
A man wakes disoriented in a strange mansion and appears to have lost 4 years of memory. He finds evidence that his name is Jerry Werrendon and a butler named Greyson affirms that he is Jerry and the mansion belongs to him. The butler tells him he has been unwell which seems to explain his confusion and memory loss. But Jerry quickly realizes that none of it is true and something nefarious is afoot. Jerry is intrigued and decides to go along with the ruse to find out the truth. But Chloe his fake wife and Colton his fake secretary soon realize that he's figured out the truth and offer him $10,000 to impersonate Werrendon in a scheme to get $200,000 in bonds from Werrendon's estate trustee. Jerry is still curious and accepts the offer, loath to abandon the intrigue. He eavesdrops on Chloe and Colton planning an escape to South America. After a meeting with Lewis, the estate trustee, Jerry receives the bonds and places them in a safe, the combination of which only the real Werrendon knows. However, in the night, Chloe and Colton discover two thieves breaking into the safe. The thieves immediately recognize Jerry as “The Sparrow” (a master safe cracker) as soon as they see him and he lets them escape before the police arrive. A very confused and convoluted interview follows, regarding Jerry's identity, and police sergeant Kerrigan eventually orders Chloe and Jerry to headquarters for questioning. But Jerry instead takes Chloe to his house explaining that Kerrigan is in his employ and he had the butler phone him with instructions to impersonate a police sergeant. Jerry finds that Chloe was simply trying to save her wastrel of a husband from Colton's financial schemes and confronts Lewis, the estate trustee, about the bonds. Lewis confesses that he was the one who hired the two thieves to steal the bonds because he needed money. Jerry then finds documents revealing that Werrrenden was dead in Colton's private vault and shows the documents to Chloe. Jerry, Chloe, Greyson, and Lewis, all convince the real police that Jerry really is Werrendon and Colton's claims that Jerry is an imposter are just the ravings of a man having a nervous breakdown. Because of his own illegal activities, Jerry cannot expose Carlton's but forces him to leave immediately for South America. Chloe then pleads with Jerry to stay with her and Jerry chooses to reform and remain.

== Cast ==
- John Miljan as Jerry Van Trevor/Jerry Werrenden
- Shirley Grey as Chloe Werrenden
- Monroe Owsley as Colton Drain
- Hale Hamilton as Colonel Gordon Lewis
- Robert Elliott as Sergeant Kerrigan
- Maurice Black as Feets
- William Franklin as Chuck
- Wilson Benge as Greyson the Butler
