= August Weekend =

1936 film by Charles Lamont

- Directed by: Charles Lamont
- Written by: Faith Baldwin; Paul Perez
- Produced by: George R. Batcheller
- Starring: Valerie Hobson; Paul Harvey; G. P. Huntley
- Cinematography: M.A. Anderson
- Edited by: Roland D. Reed
- Production company: Chesterfield Pictures
- Distributed by: Chesterfield Pictures
- Release date: February 18, 1936
- Running time: 62 minutes
- Country: United States
- Language: English

August Weekend or August Week End or Week-End Madness is a 1936 American drama film directed by Charles Lamont and starring Valerie Hobson, Paul Harvey and G. P. Huntley. The screenplay was adapted by Paul Perez from a story by Faith Baldwin. It was produced by Chesterfield Motion Pictures and distributed by Grand National Distributors.

== Cast ==
- Valerie Hobson as Claire Barry
- Paul Harvey as George Washburne
- G. P. Huntley as Kim Sherwood
- Betty Compson as Ethel Ames
- Frank Melton as Ronnie Washburne
- Edgar Norton as Grimsby
- Gigi Parrish as Elinor
- Maynard Holmes as Dave Maxwell
- Claire McDowell as Alma Washburne
- Howard C. Hickman as Spencer
- Paul West as Taxi Driver
- Phyllis Crane as Receptionist at switchboard
- Jack Gardner as Tom, secretary of Northern Country Club
- Paul Irving as Max Stanfield
- Dorothea Kent as Midge Washburne
