= Murder at Glen Athol =

1936 film by Frank R. Strayer

- Directed by: Frank R. Strayer
- Written by: John W. Krafft (adaptation); John W. Krafft (screenplay); Norman Lippincott (novel Murder at Glen Athol)
- Produced by: Maury M. Cohen (producer)
- Starring: John Miljan; Irene Ware; Iris Adrian
- Cinematography: M.A. Anderson
- Edited by: Roland D. Reed
- Production company: Invincible Pictures
- Distributed by: Chesterfield Pictures
- Release date: 1936
- Running time: 64 minutes
- Country: United States
- Language: English

Murder at Glen Athol is a 1936 American mystery film directed by Frank R. Strayer and starring John Miljan, Irene Ware and Iris Adrian.

== Plot summary ==
Irene Ware in Murder at Glen Athol.

A famous detective is invited to a swanky party at an elegant mansion. Before the night is over, he finds himself involved with gangsters, blackmail and murder.

== Cast ==
- John Miljan as Bill Holt, the detective
- Irene Ware as Jane Maxwell
- Iris Adrian as Muriel Randel
- Noel Madison as Gus Colleti
- Oscar Apfel as Reuben Marshall
- Barry Norton as Tom Randel
- Harry Holman as Campbell Snowden
- Betty Blythe as Ann Randel
- Lew Kelly as Police Sgt. Olsen
- Wilson Benge as Simpson, the Randel Butler
- E.H. Calvert as Dist. Atty. McDougal
