= Chandu the Magician =

1930s American radio show

- Audio CD collection cover
- Country of origin: United States
- Language: English
- Announcer: Howard Culver
- Written by: Vera Oldham
- Directed by: Cyril Armbrister
- Original release: 10 March 1932 – 6 September 1950

Chandu the Magician is an American supernatural radio drama which originally aired from 1931 to 1936. A revival on a different network took place 12 years later, airing from 1948 to 1950. The series was created by Harry A. Earnshaw (1878–1953) and Raymond R. Morgan. The two series portrayed the adventures of Frank Chandler, also known as Chandu, an American who had learned mystical arts, such as astral projection, which he used to fight criminals and villains, including the evil Roxor. Chandu was Steve Ditko's and Stan Lee's inspiration for the more famous Marvel Comics character Doctor Strange.

== Radio version ==
=== The original version ===
Launched in 1931 on KHJ in Los Angeles (part of The Don Lee Network, a CBS affiliate), the series was soon broadcast across the West Coast on the Don Lee-Columbia Network. It was then heard, starting in February 1932, on the East Coast on WOR, a Mutual Network affiliate. Mutual began broadcasting the series in the Midwest on October 8, 1932. The series was sponsored by White King Soap for the Don Lee-Columbia Network and by Beech Nut Gum on the Mutual Network.

Gayne Whitman played the lead role of American-born Frank Chandler, who had learned occult secrets from a yogi in India. Known as Chandu, he possessed several supernatural skills, including astral projection, teleportation and the ability to create illusions. In the film Chandu is initiated to "go forth with his youth and strength to conquer the evil that threatens mankind". His sister, Dorothy Regent, was portrayed by Margaret MacDonald.

Cyril Armbrister directed the scripts by Vera Oldham which took Chandu to far-flung locales, both real and mythical. Romantic interludes for Chandu were introduced with Egyptian Princess Nadji (Veola Vonn). Music was first furnished by Felix Mills and then Raymond Paige. According to Veola Vonn, the program was broadcast from the KHJ building on Melrose Avenue; the KHJ building is still standing, although the KHJ studios are no longer in use.

In 1932, Walter Winchell noted: "One of the smaller radio chains has a feature called Chandu, which is Hindu-Chinese for an opium preparation. In fewer words – dope".

In 1935, the production moved to WGN Chicago, a Mutual Broadcasting affiliate, with a new cast, including Howard Hoffman in the title role and Cornelia Osgood as Dorothy. Her children, Bob and Betty, were played by Olan Soule and Audrey McGrath. When this series came to an end in 1936, WGN's productions of Chandu were transcribed in the Chicago facilities of the World Broadcasting System for use on other stations. In April 1935, they were being broadcast on one other station, WJR in Detroit, Mich.

=== Revival ===
Twelve years later, the series was revived on the Mutual–Don Lee Network on June 28, 1948, as a 15-minute weekday program starring Tom Collins as Chandu and Luis van Rooten as the villainous Roxor, plotting world domination. With Howard Culver as the announcer and music by organist Korla Pandit, that series continued until January 28, 1949. The serial continuity was dropped on February 2, 1949 in favor of 30-minute episodes, each with a self-contained storyline, continuing in that format until April 28, 1949. Culver often read commercials with Pandit's organ music in the background.

On October 15, 1949, Chandu the Magician moved to ABC, where it was heard Saturdays at 7:30 pm until June and then on Wednesdays at 9:30 pm. The last broadcast was September 6, 1950.

== Film adaptations ==
In 1932, Chandu the Magician was adapted into a film starring Edmund Lowe as the eponymous character, with Bela Lugosi as Roxor and Irene Ware as Nadji. Strangely, in the later serial The Return of Chandu (1934), Lugosi took over the lead role. On February 26, 1934, the "Looking Back" column in the Fairbanks Daily News-Miner noted:

"Radio fans who have been enjoying the Chandu the Magician broadcasts, which have been sponsored by the National Grocery and Reliance Coffee, will be happy to know that the program has been made into a talking picture. The broadcast, which is regularly heard over KFQD, can be seen at the Empress Theater for this premier production".

== Original series episodes ==
- 03/17/32 #9 Transferred to Egypt
- 03/23/32 #13 The Slave Auction
- 04/12/32 #27 Important Papers Missing
- 04/13/32 #28 Betty & Bob Disappear
- 04/20/32 #33 Abdallah Joins Chandu
- 04/21/32 #34 Held at Gunpoint
- 05/30/32 #61 Finds Hidden Passageway
- 05/31/32 #62 Captured by Roxor
- 09/12/32 #136 Chandu Warns Nicky
- 09/13/32 #137 Betty Reminisces
- 09/14/32 #138 Gunfire Heard
- 09/30/32 #150 Learns Estaben's Identity
- 10/03/32 #151 Nadji Disappears
- 10/04/32 #152 Dimitri Defeated
- 10/05/32 #153 Exposes Count to Nicholas
- 10/06/32 #154 Saves Nadji from Fire
- 10/07/32 #155 Leaving After the Fire
- 10/11/32 #157 Warns Murderer
- 10/12/32 #158 Yogi Warns Chandu
- 10/13/32 #159 The Clock Strikes Five
- 11/08/32 #177 News Of Robert's Whereabouts
- 11/16/32 #183 Will Chandu Save Dorothy
- 11/17/32 #184 Magic Fails
- 11/18/32 #185 Chandu & Betty Visit Dorothy
- 11/21/32 #186 Cobra Decides Fate
- 11/22/32 #187 Bob Plans a Swap
- 11/23/32 #188 To the Temple
- 11/24/32 #189 Robert Returns
- 11/25/32 #190 Finds Betty & Bob
- 11/28/32 #191 Dr. Shaw & Black Magic
- 11/29/32 #192 Nadji Arrives
- 11/30/32 #193 Magic Successful
- 01/27/33 #235 In Algiers
- 01/30/33 #236 Buying Perfume
- 01/31/33 #237 Sees Nicholas
- 02/01/33 #238 Warning from Chandu
- 02/03/33 #240 Motor Trouble
- 02/06/33 #241 Family Reunited
- 02/07/33 #242 Betty & Bob Sneak Out
- 02/08/33 #243 Tells Story
- 02/09/33 #244 Note from Dimitri
- 02/10/33 #245 Blank Letter
- 02/13/33 #246 At Dimitri's Villa
- 02/14/33 #247 Driver Flees
- 02/15/33 #248 Nicky's Information
- 02/16/33 #249 Crystal Smashed
- 02/17/33 #250 Snake Charmer
- 02/20/33 #251 Discuss Situation
- 02/21/33 #252 Locked in Inner Room
- 02/22/33 #253 Chandu Recognized
- 02/23/33 #254 Note Found
- 04/17/33 #291 Water Supply Low
- 04/18/33 #292 Crystal Vision Fulfilled
- 04/19/33 #293 Nadji Is Murder Suspect
- 04/20/33 #294 Cigarette Poison Discovered
- 04/21/33 #295 Vindion Spotted
- 04/24/33 #296 A Man Looks Like Vindion
- 04/25/33 #297 Native Tells a Story
- 04/26/33 #298 Aboard the Liner
- 04/27/33 #299 The Island of Lura
- 05/01/33 #301 At the Entrance of the Cave
- 05/02/33 #302 Drums Underground
- 05/03/33 #303 Bob Explores the Cave
- 05/04/33 #304 Nadji Gives Chandu a Warning
- 05/05/33 #305 Vindion Talks to His People (Several Skips)
- 05/08/33 #306 Nadji Is Convinced She Must Stay
- 05/09/33 #307 Vindion Forced to Awaked the Children
- 05/10/33 #308 Vindion Tries to Stop Chandu
- 05/11/33 #309 Bob Finds Poison and a Letter
- 05/17/33 #313 Drawings from Limura
- 05/23/33 #317 Nadji Is Afraid of Vitrius
- 05/24/33 #318 In Vitrius' Observatory
- 05/25/33 #319 Vitrius' Telescope Is a Radio
- 05/26/33 #320 Plans to the Ruined Temple
- 05/29/33 #321 Vitrius Changes Plans
- 05/30/33 #322 Bob & Betty Worried About Their Mother
- 05/31/33 #323 The Temple of Death
- 06/01/33 #324 Vitrius Thought Chandler Was Dead
- 07/07/33 #350 Mrs. Regis Meets with Mr. Motleon
- 08/21/33 #381 Preparing for the Next Trip
- 10/24/34 ## Chandu Warns Nicholas
- 10/25/34 ## Betty Reminisces
- 10/26/34 ## Gunfire Heard
- 10/29/34 ## Estaben's Identity Is Learned
- 10/30/34 ## Nadji Disappears
- 10/31/34 ## Dimitri Defeated
- 11/01/34 ## Exposes Count to Nicholas
- 11/02/34 ## Nadji Saved from Fire
- 11/06/34 ## Miniature Statue Recovered
- 11/08/34 ## Cafe Waiter Is Otto
- 11/09/34 ## Yogi Warns Chandu
- 11/20/34 ## News of Robert's Location
- 12/19/34 ## Will Chandu Save Dorothy
- 12/20/34 ## Magic Fails
- 12/21/34 ## Chandu & Betty Visit Dorothy
- 12/25/34 ## Bob Plans a Swap
- 12/26/34 ## To the Temple
- 12/27/34 ## Robert Returns
- 12/28/34 ## Bob & Betty Found
- 12/31/34 ## Dr Shaw & Black Magic
- 12/22/34 ## Cobra Decides Fate
- 01/01/35 ## Nadji Arrives
- 01/02/35 ## Magic Successful
- 06/24/35 ## Adrift at Sea
- 06/25/35 ## Poison Death
- 06/26/35 ## Nadji Is Accused
- 06/27/35 ## Cigarettes of Death
- 06/28/35 ## Rescue at Sea
- 07/01/35 ## The Island of Suva
- 07/02/35 ## MrWilson's Charter Boat
- 07/03/35 ## The Footprint
- 07/04/35 ## Vindion Strikes
- 07/06/35 ## The Search for Nadji
- 07/07/35 ## Desertion
- 07/09/35 ## The Cave
- 07/11/35 ## Reunited
- 07/12/35 ## Another Encounter
- 07/15/35 ## Rescued
- 07/16/35 ## The Power of Chandu
- 07/17/35 ## The Awakening
- 07/18/35 ## Wilson's Mission
- 07/23/35 ## The Palace of the Secret Star
- 07/30/35 ## A Mental Picture
- 07/31/35 ## Rescued Again
- 08/01/35 ## The Devious Plot
- 08/02/35 ## Beware of Vitrius
- 08/05/35 ## Marshall Is Captured
- 08/06/35 ## A Message in Code
- 08/07/35 ## Clash of the Wizards
- 08/08/35 ## Chandu Victorious
- 09/13/35 ## Ruby Mine in Burma

== Revival episodes ==
- 06/28/48 # 1 Chandler Returns
- 06/29/48 # 2 Secret Papers Missing
- 06/30/48 # 3 Is Regent Alive?
- 07/01/48 # 4 In Alexandria
- 07/02/48 # 5 Dorothy Disappears
- 07/05/48 # 6 Search for Dorothy
- 07/06/48 # 7 Slave Auction Rescue
- 07/07/48 # 8 To Cairo
- 07/08/48 # 9 Blue Flame
- 07/09/48 # 10 Secret Place
- 07/12/48 # 11 Note from Nadji
- 07/13/48 # 12 Betty Meets Abdullah
- 07/14/48 # 13 Chandu Meets Nadji
- 07/15/48 # 14 Betty Is Kidnapped
- 07/19/48 # 15 Betty Is Found
- 07/20/48 # 16 Roxor Meets Nadji
- 07/21/48 # 17 Secret Entrance
- 07/22/48 # 18 Spell on Dorothy
- 07/23/48 # 19 Crystal Ball
- 07/26/48 # 20 Breaking The Spell
- 07/27/48 # 21 Betty & Bob Disappear
- 07/28/48 # 22 Secret Door
- 07/29/48 # 23 Roxor Threatens Death
- 07/30/48 # 24 Bob Rescued
- 08/02/48 # 25 Abdullah Disappears
- 08/03/48 # 26 Emerald Casket
- 08/04/48 # 27 Disappearing Ink
- 08/05/48 # 28 Looking for Casket
- 08/06/48 # 29 Sick Camel
- 08/09/48 # 30 Trouble with Guides
- 08/10/48 # 31 Low Water Supply
- 08/11/48 # 32 Abdullah's Affections
- 08/12/48 # 33 Gordon Douglas
- 08/13/48 # 34 Douglas' Dinner
- 08/16/48 # 35 Douglas Is an Imposter
- 08/17/48 # 36 Finding a Letter
- 08/18/48 # 37 Nile Cruise
- 08/19/48 # 38 Chandu's Disguise
- 08/20/48 # 39 Manuscript Found
- 08/23/48 # 40 Douglas Tells Roxor
- 08/24/48 # 41 Letter Arrives
- 08/25/48 # 42 Roxor's Plans
- 08/26/48 # 43 Fraud's Identity
- 08/27/48 # 44 Abdullah Stabbed
- 08/30/48 # 45 Inquest Planned
- 08/31/48 # 46 Douglas Disappears
- 09/01/48 # 47 Lost in the Catacombs
- 09/02/48 # 48 Chandu's Rescue
- 09/03/48 # 49 Roxor Is Alive
- 09/06/48 # 50 Chandu Escapes
- 09/07/48 # 51 Reaching the Ruins
- 09/08/48 # 52 Judy Allen
- 09/09/48 # 53 Torture Chamber
- 09/10/48 # 54 Story Teller
- 09/13/48 # 55 Cairo Restaurant
- 09/14/48 # 56 Robert's Ring
- 09/15/48 # 57 Arenia the Spider
- 09/16/48 # 58 Curse on Betty
- 09/17/48 # 59 Ben Ali's House
- 09/20/48 # 60 Opening the Letter
- 09/21/48 # 61 Sonya Shoots Nadji
- 09/22/48 # 62 Betty & Bob Run
- 09/23/48 # 63 Arenia Is Shot
- 09/24/48 # 64 Message for Nadji
- 09/27/48 # 65 Mirror of Life
- 09/28/48 # 66 Roxor Is Killed
- 09/29/48 # 67 Exploring The Garden
- 09/30/48 # 68 Family Is Reunited
- 10/01/48 # 69 Explosion
- 10/04/48 # 70 Contacts Dorothy
- 10/05/48 # 71 Gardener Recognized
- 10/06/48 # 72 Bribery Attempt
- 10/07/48 # 73 Secret Meeting
- 10/08/48 # 74 Landmark Spotted
- 10/11/48 # 75 Map Found
- 10/12/48 # 76 Fortune Told
- 10/13/48 # 77 Dancing Partner Recognized
- 10/14/48 # 78 Meets Dimitri
- 10/15/48 # 79 Spell Cast on Bob
- 10/18/48 # 80 Gypsy Coming After Betty & Bob
- 10/19/48 # 81 Dimitri Asked to Leave
- 10/20/48 # 82 Castle Plans Found
- 10/21/48 # 83 Warning from Nadji
- 10/22/48 # 84 Advice for Nicholas
- 10/25/48 # 85 Tells About Plans
- 10/26/48 # 86 Spell Cast
- 10/27/48 # 87 Nadji Told of Curse
- 10/28/48 # 88 Looking for Dorothy
- 10/29/48 # 89 Finding Dorothy's Hat
- 11/01/48 # 90 Nicholas Has Disappeared
- 11/02/48 # 91 Trying to Escape
- 11/03/48 # 92 Thinks Nicholas Is in the Castle
- 11/04/48 # 93 Nicholas Found
- 11/05/48 # 94 Dwarf Spotted
- 11/08/48 # 95 Chandler Admits Real Mission
- 11/09/48 # 96 To Go to Schmitar Mountain
- 11/10/48 # 97 Call from Paris
- 11/11/48 # 98 Threat from Dimitri
- 11/12/48 # 99 Stranger Spotted
- 11/15/48 #100 Fortune Told
- 11/16/48 #101 Chandler Trapped
- 11/17/48 #102 Enters Cave
- 11/18/48 #103 Learns Estaben's Identity
- 11/19/48 #104 Influences Dimitri
- 11/22/48 #105 Metso's Killed
- 11/23/48 #106 Spell Broken
- 11/24/48 #107 Threat from Dwarf
- 11/25/48 #108 Nadji Arrives
- 11/26/48 #109 Fire
- 11/29/48 #110 Chandler Escapes Fire
- 11/30/48 #111 Forged Letter
- 12/01/48 #112 Nadji Leaves
- 12/02/48 #113 Lupu Arrives
- 12/03/48 #114 Chandler Discovered
- 12/06/48 #115 Reveals Himself as Chandu (Dropout)
- 12/07/48 #116 Kingdom Regained
- 12/08/48 #117 Phone Call from Robert
- 12/09/48 #118 Lab Emptied
- 12/10/48 #119 Gomez Spotted
- 12/13/48 #120 Robert Seen in Crystal
- 12/14/48 #121 Learns Roxor's Location
- 12/15/48 #122 Wants to Enter Village of the Lost
- 12/16/48 #123 Jeff Worried
- 12/17/48 #124 Warned About Jeff
- 12/20/48 #125 Jeff's New Mission
- 12/21/48 #126 House in the Desert
- 12/22/48 #127 Saved from Spider
- 12/23/48 #128 Jeff Found
- 12/24/48 #129 Tries to Contact Robert
- 12/27/48 #130 Imposter Found Out
- 12/28/48 #131 Robert Found
- 12/29/48 #132 Story Told
- 12/30/48 #133 Looking for Betty
- 12/31/48 #134 Dorothy in Temple
- 01/03/49 #135 Talks to Chief
- 01/04/49 #136 Fate to Be Decided Soon
- 01/05/49 #137 Fails Cobra Test
- 01/06/49 #138 Refuses Escape Plan
- 01/07/49 #139 Robert Returns
- 01/10/49 #140 Truth About Dr. Shaw
- 01/11/49 #141 Help from Yogi
- 01/12/49 #142 Murderer Revealed
- 01/13/49 #143 Dorothy Safe
- 01/14/49 #144 Planning Tiger Hunt
- 01/17/49 #145 Tiger Killed
- 01/18/49 #146 Saves Lao Sing (Faulty)
- 01/19/49 #147 In Calcutta
- 01/20/49 #148 Dinner Invitation
- 01/21/49 #149 Dr. Shaw in Calcutta
- 01/24/49 #150 Under Dr. Shaw's Influence
- 01/25/49 #151 Impersonates Chandler
- 01/26/49 #152 Bob Missing
- 01/27/49 #153 Strange Markings
- 01/28/49 #154 Frank Returns to India
- 02/03/49 # 1 The Black Steps
- 02/10/49 # 2 The Village of Thieves
- 02/17/49 # 3 Man with the Photographic Memory
- 02/24/49 # 4 The Brotherhood of the Blood Oath
- 03/03/49 # 5 The Spell of Dimitri
- 03/10/49 # 6 Framed for Drug Smuggling
- 03/17/49 # 7 The Temple at Karnak
- 03/24/49 # 8 Temple Under the Sea
- 03/31/49 # 9 The House of Fear
- 04/14/49 #11 The Voice of Darkness
- 04/21/49 #12 The Ominous Sahara
- 04/28/49 #13 The Fog on the Forgotten Valley
- 07/26/50 Rocket Sabotage
- 08/02/50 Clever Jeff Adams
- 08/09/50 Henry the Dress Designer
- 08/16/50 Black Market Hi-Jackers
