= Edward Jewell =

Edward Jewell may refer to:

- Edward Alden Jewell (1888–1947), New York Times art critic, American novelist
- Edward C. Jewell (1894–1963), American film art director
