= The Ghost Walks =

1934 film by Frank R. Strayer

- Directed by: Frank R. Strayer
- Written by: Charles Belden
- Produced by: Maury M. Cohen
- Starring: John Miljan; June Collyer
- Cinematography: M.A. Anderson
- Edited by: Roland D. Reed
- Production company: Invincible Pictures Corp.
- Distributed by: Chesterfield Pictures
- Release date: December 1, 1934
- Running time: 69 minutes
- Country: United States
- Language: English

The Ghost Walks is a 1934 American comedy mystery film directed by Frank R. Strayer starring John Miljan and June Collyer.

== Plot ==
On a stormy night, a theatrical producer, his secretary, and playwright Prescott Ames are stranded when their car skids off the road and gets stuck. The three take refuge in the nearby home of Dr. Kent, a friend of Ames's. One of Kent's patients, who is staying at the house, is acting strangely, and the others in the house tell the newcomers that she is behaving this way because it is the anniversary of her husband's murder. At dinner, the group begins exchanging accusations about the murder, when suddenly the lights go out, and soon afterwards comes the first in a series of mysterious and fearful events.

The producer thinks all the strange occurrences are part of a ploy to get him to produce a play for Ames: One of the other characters exclaims, "These fools think we are putting on a play for their benefit!" The dinner-party was a scene from Ames's play, but when a madman sneaks into the house and tries to graft different body parts on the theatrical producer and his secretary, they realize it isn't a play.

== Cast ==
- John Miljan as Prescott Ames
- June Collyer as Gloria Shaw
- Richard Carle as Herman Wood
- Henry Kolker as Dr. Kent
- Johnny Arthur as Homer Erskine
- Spencer Charters as a Guard
- Donald Kirke as Terry Shaw aka Terry Gray
- Eve Southern as Beatrice
- Douglas Gerrard as Carroway (billed as Douglas Gerard)
- Wilson Benge as Jarvis
- Jack Shutta as Head Guard
- Harry Strang as Guard

== Reception ==
Wanda Hale of the New York Daily News gave the film two out of four stars, highlighting "several funny scenes, with Johnny Arthur and Richard Carle as the comics. Then, too, there is the suave John Miljan and the lovely June Collyer and Eve Southern to add romance to the horrors."

In 1997, author Michael R. Pitts complimented the plot element of the dress rehearsal in the film's first act, and wrote: "While the remainder of the film does not quite live up to these early scenes, it is a well-modulated melodrama which never seems to take itself too seriously."

== See also ==
- List of ghost films
