= The Quitter (1934 film) =

1934 film

- Directed by: Richard Thorpe
- Written by: Robert Ellis
- Produced by: George R. Batcheller
- Starring: Charley Grapewin; Emma Dunn; Barbara Weeks
- Cinematography: M.A. Anderson
- Production company: Chesterfield Pictures
- Distributed by: Chesterfield Pictures
- Release date: February 5, 1934
- Running time: 68 minutes
- Country: United States
- Language: English

The Quitter is a 1934 American drama film directed by Richard Thorpe and starring Charley Grapewin, Emma Dunn and Barbara Weeks. It was produced and distributed by the Poverty Row studio Chesterfield Pictures.

== Plot ==
When her husband, the founder of a crusading newspaper, doesn't return from serving in France in World War I his wife takes over both the newspaper and the raising of their two sons. As he grows one of her sons wants the newspaper to abandon its traditional stance and try and move more up market. Stories also begin to circulate that her husband did not die in the war, but is still living abroad under a new identity.

== Cast ==
- Charley Grapewin as Ed Tilford
- Emma Dunn as Cordelia Tilford
- William Bakewell as Russell Tilford
- Barbara Weeks as Diana Winthrop
- Hale Hamilton as Maj. Stephen Winthrop
- Glen Boles as Eddie Tilford
- Mary Kornman as Annabelle Hibbs
- Lafe McKee as Zack
- Aggie Herring as Hannah
- Jane Keckley as Sister Hooten
- Edward LeSaint as Travers
- John Elliott as Advertiser
- Frank LaRue as Townsman
- Phillips Smalley as Graham the Banker

== Bibliography ==
- Pitts, Michael R. Poverty Row Studios, 1929-1940. McFarland & Company, 2005.
