= By Appointment Only (1933 film) =

1933 film

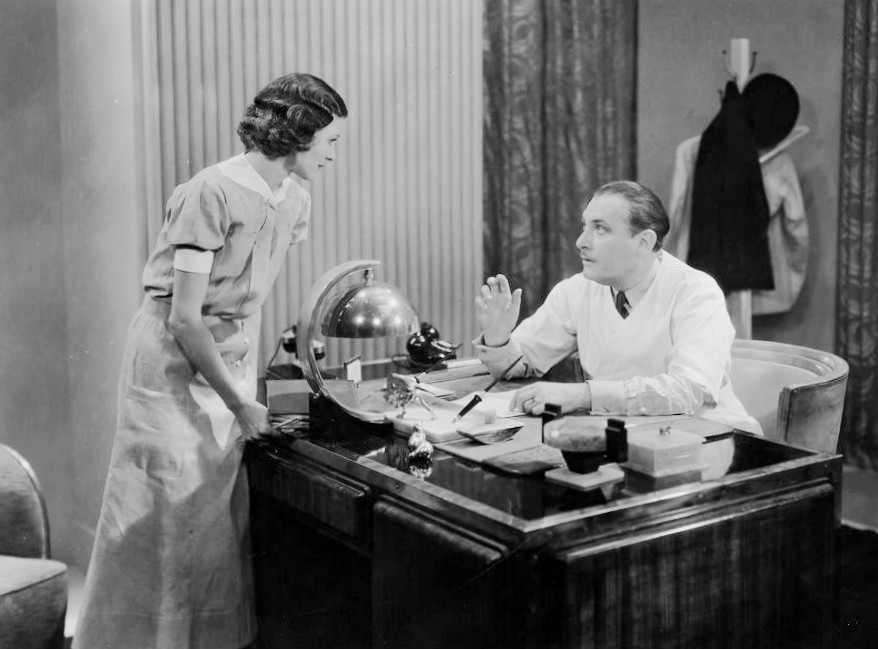
- Marceline Day and Lew Cody in a scene from the film.
- Directed by: Frank R. Strayer
- Written by: Robert Ellis (screenplay and dialogue); Frank R. Strayer (writer)
- Produced by: Maury M. Cohen (producer)
- Cinematography: M. A. Anderson
- Edited by: Roland D. Reed
- Distributed by: Chesterfield Pictures
- Release date: July 7, 1933
- Running time: 67 minutes
- Country: United States
- Language: English

By Appointment Only is a 1933 American pre-Code film directed by Frank R. Strayer.

== Plot ==
Successful doctor Michael Travers juggles a busy schedule of patients, one of whom is the mother of 14-year-old Judy. After Judy's mother dies, Travers and his fiancé, Diane Manners, take responsibility for Judy's care. Upon returning from a three-year trip to Europe, Travers finds himself falling in love with Judy, despite her engagement to Diane's younger brother, Dick. Tensions rise as the four become aware of each other's feelings. Travers finally realizes how things must be, and the film ends with the marriage of Judy and Dick.

== Cast ==
- Lew Cody as Dr. Michael Travers
- Aileen Pringle as Diane Manners
- Sally O'Neil as Judy Carroll
- Edward Morgan as Richard "Dick" Manners
- Edward Martindel as Judge Barry Phelps
- Wilson Benge as Withers, the Butler
- Marceline Day as Miss Brown aka Brownie
- Claire McDowell as Mrs. Mary Carroll
- Pauline Garon as Gwen Reid
- Gladys Blake as Helen, Switchboard Operator
