= In Paris, A.W.O.L. =

1936 film

- Directed by: Roland D. Reed
- Written by: Ewart Adamson
- Produced by: William Rowland
- Starring: Lola Lane; Irene Ware; Lawrence Gray
- Cinematography: Harry Jackson
- Edited by: Arthur Hilton
- Music by: Maurice Ruebens
- Production company: William Rowland Productions
- Distributed by: Principal Distributing
- Release date: April 1, 1936
- Running time: 67 minutes
- Country: United States
- Language: English

In Paris, A.W.O.L. is a 1936 American comedy film directed by Roland D. Reed and starring Lola Lane, Irene Ware and Lawrence Gray. The film's sets were designed by the art director Edward C. Jewell. It was later reissued under the alternative title Let's Pretend We're Sweethearts.

== Plot ==
A vaudeville performer enlists in the American Expeditionary Force during World War I after falling out with his romantic and professional partner. They are later reunited in Paris.

== Cast ==
- Lola Lane as Lola
- Irene Ware as Constance
- Lawrence Gray as Buddy
- Chick Chandler as Eddie
- George Meeker as David
- Sam Lee as Vaudeville Act
- Al Shaw as Vaudeville Act
- Richard Tucker as Army Officer
- Jack La Rue as Soldier
- George Humbert as Performer
- John Kelly as Performer
- Junior Schiemph as Soldier
- Marty Brooks as Soldier

== Bibliography ==
- Fetrow, Alan G. . Sound films, 1927-1939: a United States Filmography. McFarland, 1992.
- Hanson, Patricia King . The American Film Institute Catalog of Motion Pictures Produced in the United States: Feature Films, 1931-1940, Volumes 1-3. University of California Press, 1993.
- Mank, Gregory William. Bela Lugosi and Boris Karloff: The Expanded Story of a Haunting Collaboration, with a Complete Filmography of Their Films Together.
