= The Return of Chandu =

1934 American film serial

- Directed by: Ray Taylor
- Written by: Barry Barringer (adaptation); Harry A. Earnshaw (radio show); R.R. Morgan (radio show); Vera M. Oldham (radio show)
- Produced by: Sol Lesser
- Starring: Bela Lugosi
- Cinematography: John Hickson
- Edited by: Carl Himm; Louis Sackin
- Production company: Sol Lesser Productions
- Distributed by: Principal Distributing Corp.
- Release date: October 1, 1934
- Running time: 208 minutes (12 chapters); 65 minutes (theatrical version)
- Country: United States
- Language: English

The Return of Chandu, Chapter 1, The Chosen Victim

The Return of Chandu is a 1934 American 12-episode fantasy film serial based on the radio series Chandu the Magician. It was produced by Sol Lesser and directed by Ray Taylor, and starred Béla Lugosi as Frank Chandler (known professionally as Chandu the Magician).

The serial was originally offered to theaters in any one of three ways: as a conventional serial of 12 weekly chapters running 20 minutes each; as a 76-minute feature film comprising the first four episodes, to be followed by the remaining eight episodes in weekly serial format; or as the 76-minute feature as a self-contained attraction, ending not with cliffhanger but with a specially filmed ending resolving the story. In 1935, the remaining eight episodes of the serial were also edited into a second feature film, 65 minutes long, released as Chandu on the Magic Island.

The Return of Chandu cast Lugosi against type as a romantic lead. It marked one of the few times that Lugosi played a protagonist rather than an antagonist: in fact, Lugosi had played Roxor, the main villain, in the 1932 film Chandu the Magician.

== Plot summary ==
Frank Chandler (Béla Lugosi in a rare heroic role): a powerful but kind man who has spent most of his life in the Orient, where he is renowned under the name of "Chandu the Magician" for his tremendous skill with White Magic. He is in love with the Princess Nadji of Egypt, who has lately escaped to America and is now staying with the Chandler family at their home in Beverly Hills, California. Princess Nadji believes she has left her troubles behind in Egypt, but when the Chandlers hold a party in her honor, she learns that her life is still in jeopardy, as are the lives of her friends. Chandu, presently arriving home from Egypt himself, is pursued by enemies at the airport, and escapes only by using his magic ring. At the party, some shady guests conspire to poison Princess Nadji, and Chandu arrives just in time to snatch the glass of deadly wine out of her hand.

Chandu explains to Nadji what has happened, and why she is in danger. A cult of Black Magic sorcerers, the Sect of Ubasti, have recently recovered the perfectly preserved body of their last high priestess, Ossana. Legend tells that Ossana will one day be resurrected and will rule the "lost continent" of Lemuria again; however, in order to resurrect her, the Ubasti must make a human sacrifice, and the sacrifice must be an Egyptian princess of royal blood. Chandu says: "Princess Nadji is the only living Egyptian princess and the Ubasti will stop at nothing". The cult are determined to capture Nadji and sacrifice her to their god.

The 12 chapters of The Return of Chandu follow Chandu and his family (his sister, his nephew, and his niece) on various adventures while they struggle, by both magical and not-so-magical means, to rescue and protect Princess Nadji from the Sect of Ubasti. Their journey brings them finally to the land of Lemuria itself, where Chandu must decide whether he can renounce his love for Nadji in order to save her life.

== Cast ==
- Béla Lugosi as Frank Chandler, aka Chandu the Magician
- Maria Alba as Princess Nadji
- Clara Kimball Young as Dorothy Regent
- Dean Benton as Bob Regent
- Phyllis Ludwig as Betty Regent
- Lucien Prival as Vindhyan [Chs. 1-4]
- Cyril Armbrister as Henchman Sutra [Chs.1-4]
- Murdock MacQuarrie as The "Voice" of Ubasti [Chs. 4-12]
- Wilfred Lucas as Capt. Wilson [Chs. 4-12]
- Jack J. Clark as Vitras, High Priest of Ubasti [Chs. 4-12]
- Josef Swickard as Tyba, the White Magician [Chs. 8-12]

== Chapter list ==
1. The Chosen Victim
2. The House in the Hills
3. On the High Seas
4. The Evil Eye
5. The Invisible Circle
6. Chandu's False Step
7. Mysterious Magic
8. The Edge of the Pit
9. The Terror Invisible
10. The Crushing Rock
11. The Uplifted Knife
12. The Knife Descends

== Production ==
Filming began in July 1934; the serial was ready for release in October. Although the main titles of the film credit producer Sol Lesser's own Principal Pictures Corporation, The Return of Chandu was released to theaters by the independent First Division organization on October 9, 1934. Many theaters led off with the feature film, comprising the first four chapters, followed by a special trailer giving advance previews of the action to come, and telling audiences that the remainder of the story would be seen in eight weekly installments.

== Reception ==
Motion Picture Daily said: "The Return of Chandu is 12 episodes of thrills and mystery. It will keep the youngsters on the edge of their seats. Although there have been tentative plans to release the film as a feature [later fulfilled], it cuts up into a much better serial with promise of a good reception at neighborhood box-offices. Director Ray Taylor's handling of suspense is excellent."

"This new Chandu will deliver all its promises," reported The Exhibitor, noting Chandu's popularity on radio. "Chandu background has the radio plugging to aid it and, as a serial, it contains all the thrills, fights, punches, etc. Kids will love it and the grown folks will probably be intrigued by it as well."

Film Daily reviewed the 76-minute feature version: "Béla Lugosi creates thrills and suspense in a tingling drama of Oriental magic. It is all done with a polish and class that lifts it out of the thrill hoke division, and makes it an hour of thrills for an intelligent audience to enjoy."

Roland Barton of Independent Exhibitors Film Bulletin picked up on the first four chapters being the stronger portion of the serial: "Had the producers been able to maintain the same interest in the second half as they did in the first, they would have a knockout on their hands. As it is, these further screen adventures of Chandu the magician constitute an engrossing, well told mystery film." Barton advised exhibitors, "The trailer following the feature gives the serial a grand sendoff. You should be able to realize some worthwhile money with this."

== See also ==
- Chandu the Magician, an earlier film in which Lugosi portrayed the character of Roxor
