= O'Malley of the Mounted (1936 film) =

1936 film by David Howard

- Theatrical release poster
- Directed by: David Howard
- Screenplay by: Frank Howard Clark; Daniel Jarrett
- Story by: William S. Hart
- Produced by: Sol Lesser
- Starring: George O'Brien; Irene Ware; Stanley Fields; James Bush; Victor Potel; Reginald Barlow
- Cinematography: Frank B. Good
- Edited by: Arthur Hilton
- Production company: 20th Century Fox
- Distributed by: 20th Century Fox
- Release date: March 27, 1936
- Running time: 59 minutes
- Country: United States
- Language: English

O'Malley of the Mounted is a 1936 American Western film directed by David Howard and written by Frank Howard Clark and Daniel Jarrett. The film stars George O'Brien, Irene Ware, Stanley Fields, James Bush, Victor Potel and Reginald Barlow. The film was released on March 27, 1936, by 20th Century Fox.

== Cast ==
- George O'Brien as Constable O'Malley RCMP aka Duke Kinnard
- Irene Ware as Edith 'Edie' Hyland
- Stanley Fields as Red Jagger
- James Bush as Bud Hyland
- Victor Potel as Gabby
- Reginald Barlow as Commissioner
- Richard Cramer as Henchman Butch
- Tom London as Henchman Lefty
- Crauford Kent as Inspector McGregor
