= Maury M. Cohen =

American film producer (c. 1913–1979)

Maury Cohen
- Born: Maurice Cohen c. 1913; Chicago, Illinois, United States
- Died: March 15, 1979; Los Angeles, California, United States
- Occupation: Producer
- Years active: 1932–77
- Spouse: Bonnie Jean Williams (1950-1979, his death)

Maury Cohen (ca. 1913 - March 15, 1979), also known as Maury M. Cohen, was an American film producer most active during the 1930s. He owned one of the Poverty Row studios, Invincible films, which specialized in making low-budget feature films. After leaving film in the early 1940s, Cohen founded and ran the historic dance club in Los Angeles, the Hollywood Palladium.

== Career ==
In the early 1930s, Cohen founded Invincible Pictures, which specialized in low-budget films. His company teamed with Chesterfield Pictures, headed by George R. Batcheller, and they were often referred to as "C and I" or "Chesterfield and Invincible". The two companies shared the same personnel and equipment.

Low-budget production companies had budgets of around $10,000, and shot pictures in a matter of days, rather than weeks. They would use rented facilities, and would incorporate stock footage and musical numbers in order to lengthen their pictures. The combined company of Chesterfield-Invincible produced more than 100 features, and launched the careers of directors Richard Thorpe and Charles Lamont.

By 1933, C and I had a production and distribution deal with Universal Pictures which allowed them to use the resources of the major studio, including the studio's sets, film and recording equipment. The latter was especially important, enabling C and I to exceed the audible quality of the other independent studios. In 1936, Cohen led a contingent which negotiated a deal with Allied Pictures Corporation, whereby Allied would provide Chesterfield and Invincible with financial support allowing them to create a higher caliber of picture than then had been producing during the early 1930s. Also in 1933, Cohen was at the forefront of a movement by independent producers to change the NRA code, in order to assure the validity of theaters being able to show a second feature on a program. Cohen and Batcheller ended their deal with Universal in 1934, and entered into an agreement with Pathe, to utilize their facilities and equipment.

The double feature, which came into vogue during the Great Depression, gave thrifty moviegoers two full-length films for the price of one. The major studios resisted this policy, not wishing to let their product be sold for less than the usual price. Smaller companies like Chesterfield and Invincible catered to the "bargain night" exhibitors with lower-priced pictures, and the majors began losing business to the minors. Only then did the major studios make budget films specifically for double-feature programs; the studios established their own "B" units, and the double feature became the standard program everywhere.

Cohen announced in August 1934 that C and I would produce 18 films in the 1934-35 schedule. In early 1935 Cohen survived a health scare, when he had to undergo emergency appendectomy procedure. Rumors began circulating in May 1935 that Cohen's company, along with Batcheller's, were to merge with Republic Pictures. Cohen denied those rumors. In December 1936, it was reported that Cohen was seeking to sell Invincible and begin producing for one of the major studios. Less than two weeks later, Cohen had signed agreements with Samuel J. Briskin to leave Invincible and had signed on with RKO to produce, which led to Invincible being disbanded. The remnants of Invincible were one of a number of Poverty Row studios taken over by Herbert Yates in 1936 and merged into his newly formed Republic Pictures in an attempt to create a dominant low-budget producer with enough power to take on the major studios. His first film at his new studio was 1937's Living on Love (originally titled Love in a Basement), directed by Lew Landers. Cohen's stay at RKO was short-lived however, and after his year-long contract expired, he left RKO.

At the end of 1938, Cohen signed an agreement with Meglin Kiddies, to produce a series of films for the company. In 1939 Cohen was hired by United Artists to produce a Spanish language film, slated solely for the foreign market. The film was titled La Inmaculada, and starred Fortunio Bonanova. In 1940, Cohen was part of a government anti-trust lawsuit against the major film production companies, which claimed that independent producers were systematically excluded from producing by the majors.

In 1941, Cohen opened a dance venue in Hollywood, the Palladium, located on the site of the original Paramount Pictures. The Palladium opened on October 29, 1940, with an opening act headlined by Frank Sinatra, along with Tommy Dorsey and his Orchestra. During World War II it was an extremely successful endeavor, particularly among military personnel, and it remained a popular dance spot through the 1940s and 1950s. Cohen would work on the production for one last film, 1977's Damnation Alley, on which he was the associate producer. The film stars Jan-Michael Vincent and George Peppard.

Cohen married Bonnie Jean Williams in 1950. The couple had two children, Jonathan and Richard. The couple remained married until Cohen's death on March 15, 1979.

== Filmography ==
(Per AFI database)

An * denotes a featured or starring role

- The Secrets of Wu Sin (1932)
- Escapade (1932)
- In the Money (1933)
- By Appointment Only (1933)
- Dance Girl Dance (1933)
- Fugitive Road (1934)
- In Love with Life (1934)
- The Ghost Walks (1934)
- Port of Lost Dreams (1934)
- One in a Million (1934)
- Twin Husbands (1934)
- Condemned to Live (1935)
- Public Opinion (1935)
- Death from a Distance (1935)
- Symphony of Living (1935)
- Society Fever (1935)
- Ellis Island (1936)
- Hitch Hike to Heaven (1936)
- Easy Money (1936)
- The Bridge of Sighs (1936)
- It Couldn't Have Happened – But It Did (1936)
- Brilliant Marriage (1936)
- Tango (1936)
- Three of a Kind (1936)
- Murder at Glen Athol (1936)
- Danger Patrol (1937)
- Quick Money (1937)
- You Can't Buy Luck (1937)
- The Big Shot (1937)
- Living on Love (1937)
- Double Danger (1938)
- La Inmaculada (1939)
- Damnation Alley (1977)
