= Chandu the Magician (film) =

1932 film

Chandu The Magician
- Directed by: William Cameron Menzies; Marcel Varnel
- Screenplay by: Barry Conners; Philip Klein
- Starring: Edmund Lowe; Irene Ware; Bela Lugosi; Herbert Mundin
- Cinematography: James Wong Howe
- Edited by: Harold D. Schuster
- Music by: Louis De Francesco
- Color process: Black and white
- Production company: Fox Film Corporation
- Distributed by: Fox Film Corporation
- Release date: September 18, 1932
- Running time: 71 minutes
- Country: United States
- Language: English

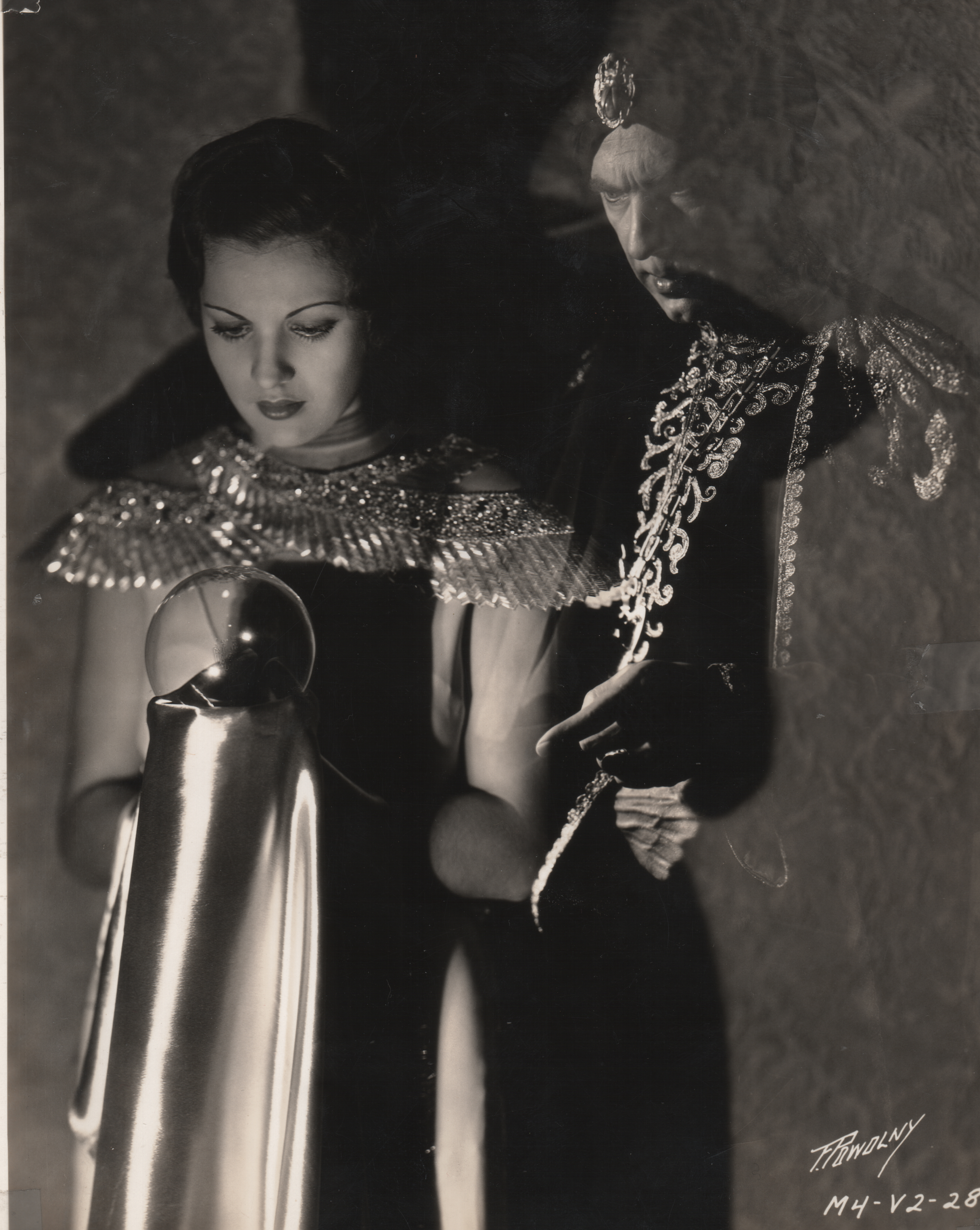
Irene Ware and Bela Lugosi

Chandu the Magician is a 1932 American pre-Code fantasy horror mystery film and starring Edmund Lowe, Irene Ware, Bela Lugosi and Herbert Mundin. Based on the radio play of the same name, written by Harry A. Earnshaw, Vera M. Oldham and R.R. Morgan. The radio series was broadcast from 1931 to 1936, and Fox obtained the rights hoping the film would appeal to a ready-made audience. In 1934 Chandu returned in a twelve part serial, The Return of Chandu, with Bela Lugosi playing the title role.

== Plot ==
For three years, Frank Chandler has studied eastern magic with the Yogis in India and is now known by his new identity, Chandu. He now has the power to teleport, astral project, mesmerize, as well as project illusions. With these supernatural abilities he has been entrusted by his teacher to "go forth with his youth and strength to conquer the evil that threatens mankind". Chandu is sent to Egypt to deal with an Egyptian megalomaniac known as Roxor. Roxor kidnaps Chandu's brother-in-law, Robert Regent, an inventor who has developed a death ray whose beams reach halfway round the world. The evil Roxor plots to use the ray to aid his plans for world domination. Chandu must utilise all his psychic abilities to rescue his brother-in-law, and also his sister and their children, whom Roxor has kidnapped in a plot to force Regent into revealing the secrets of his death ray. Chandu's sweetheart Egyptian Princess Nadji is also kidnapped, leaving Chandu with the quandary whom to rescue first. Using his Yogi abilities, Chandu makes daring escapes, including one from a submerged sarcophagus. Eventually he succeeds in rescuing everyone and mesmerizing Roxor long enough to destroy both the death ray and the villain's entire lair.

== Cast ==
- Edmund Lowe as Chandu/Frank Chandler
- Irene Ware as Princess Nadji
- Bela Lugosi as Roxor
- Herbert Mundin as Albert Miggles
- Henry B. Walthall as Robert Regent
- Weldon Heyburn as Abdulah
- June Lang as Betty Lou Regent (as June Vlasek)
- Michael Stuart as Bobby Regent (as Nestor Aber)
- Virginia Hammond as Dorothy Regent
- Nigel De Brulier as Yogi Teacher (uncredited)
- John George as Bidder (uncredited)
- Charles Stevens as Ali (uncredited)

== Critical reception ==
The New York Times called it "whooping entertainment for the children and a series of naïvely juvenile escapades for the grown-ups".

== See also ==
- The Return of Chandu serial with Bela Lugosi
