= William Bakewell =

American actor (1908–1993)

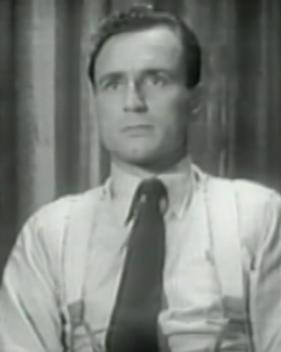
- Bakewell in The Fabulous Dorseys (1947)
- Born: William Robertson Bakewell; May 2, 1908; Los Angeles, California, U.S.
- Died: April 15, 1993 (aged 84); Los Angeles, California, U.S.
- Other name: Billy Bakewell
- Occupation: Actor
- Years active: 1923–1975
- Spouses: Jennifer Holt (m. 1946; div. 1948) Diane Griffith (m. 1954)
- Children: 2

William Robertson Bakewell (May 2, 1908 – April 15, 1993) was an American actor. He achieved his greatest fame as one of the leading juvenile performers of the late 1920s and early 1930s.

== Early years ==
Bakewell was a native of Los Angeles, where he attended the Harvard School for Boys and Page Military Academy.

== Career ==
Bakewell began his film career as an extra in the silent movie Fighting Blood (1924) and appeared in some 170 films and television shows. He had supporting roles at the end of the silent era and reached the peak of his career around 1930. He is perhaps best remembered for playing German soldier Albert Kropp in All Quiet on the Western Front (1930) and Rodney Jordan, Joan Crawford's brother, in Dance, Fools, Dance (1931). He also co-starred in Gold Diggers of Broadway (1929).

In 1933, Bakewell contributed to the founding of the Screen Actors Guild, and was the 44th of the original 50 members. He never achieved stardom after the Depression years, although he became familiar in dozens of films, including his short appearance as a mounted soldier in Gone with the Wind (1939) whom Scarlett O'Hara asks when the Yankee soldiers are coming to Atlanta.

During World War II, Bakewell served in the U.S. Army with the rank of second lieutenant. He was stationed at the 73rd Evacuation Hospital and at the Radio Section of the Special Service Division as the post intelligence officer. He also worked under the department that handled distribution of recorded programs to overseas station circuits.

He starred in the Columbia Pictures serial Hop Harrigan (1946), where he played a top Air Corps pilot. He also portrayed Major Tobias Norton and a Keelboat Race Master of Ceremonies in the phenomenally popular Disney series Davy Crockett (1954-1955).

In the 1960s, he guest-starred in numerous sitcoms, including Guestward, Ho!, The Tab Hunter Show, Pete and Gladys, Bringing Up Buddy, Mister Ed, Leave It to Beaver, The Jack Benny Program, Petticoat Junction , and Hazel. He also was cast in episodes of Peter Gunn, Sea Hunt, Wagon Train, The Roaring 20s, The Virginian, Arrest and Trial, and 87th Precinct. He played the Virginia statesman George Wythe in the episode "George Mason" in the 1965 NBC documentary series Profiles in Courage. His last film appearance was in The Strongest Man in the World (1975). He spent most of the last half of his life as a successful realtor in California.

Bakewell served on the board of the Motion Picture & Television Fund for four decades.

== Book ==
Bakewell's autobiography, Hollywood Be Thy Name: Random Recollections of a Movie Veteran from Silents to Talkies to TV, which chronicled his long screen career, was published in 1991.

== Death ==
On April 15, 1993, Bakewell died of leukemia in Los Angeles, California, at the age of 84.

== Partial filmography ==
- Fighting Blood (1923) - Minor Role (uncredited)
- A Regular Fellow (1925)
- The Last Edition (1925) - 'Ink' Donovan
- The Gilded Butterfly (1926) - Party Guest (uncredited)
- The Waning Sex (1926) - Minor Role (uncredited)
- Whispering Wires (1926) - (uncredited)
- Old Ironsides (1926) - Young Philadelphian (uncredited)
- Bertha, the Sewing Machine Girl (1926)
- The Heart Thief (1927) - Victor
- Mother (1927) - Jerry Ellis
- The Magic Flame (1927)
- The Shield of Honor (1927) - Jerry MacDowell
- West Point (1927) - 'Tex' McNeil
- The Latest from Paris (1928) - Bud Dolan
- The Devil's Trademark (1928) - Tom Benton
- The Harold Teen (1928) - Percival
- The Battle of the Sexes (1928) - Billy Judson
- Annapolis (1928) - Skippy
- Lady of the Pavements (1929) - A Pianist
- The Iron Mask (1929) - Louis XIV / Twin Brother
- Hot Stuff (1929) - Mack Moran
- On with the Show! (1929) - Jimmy/Performer in 'Bicycle Built for Two' Number
- Gold Diggers of Broadway (1929) - Wally
- Lummox (1930) - Paul Charvet
- Playing Around (1930) - Jack
- All Quiet on the Western Front (1930) - Albert Kropp
- The Bat Whispers (1930) - Brook
- Paid (1930) - Carney
- Reducing (1931) - Tommy Haverly
- The Great Meadow (1931) - Jack Jarvis (uncredited)
- Dance, Fools, Dance (1931) - Rodney Jordan
- Daybreak (1931) - Otto
- A Woman of Experience (1931) - Count Karl Runyi
- Politics (1931) - Benny Emerson
- Guilty Hands (1931) - Tommy Osgood
- The Spirit of Notre Dame (1931) - Jim Stewart
- Cheaters at Play (1932) - Maurice Perry
- While Paris Sleeps (1932) - Paul Renoir
- Back Street (1932) - Richard Saxel - Walter's Son
- The Secret of Madame Blanche (1933) - Minor Role (scenes deleted)
- Lucky Devils (1933) - Slugger Jones
- Three-Cornered Moon (1933) - Douglas Rimplegar
- A Man of Sentiment (1933) - John Russell
- Straightaway (1933) - Billy Dawson
- You Can't Buy Everything (1934) - Donny 'Don' Bell as a man
- The Quitter (1934) - Russell Tilford
- Speed Wings (1934) - Jerry
- Green Eyes (1934) - Cliff Miller
- Straight Is the Way (1934) - Dr. Wilkes
- The Party's Over (1934) - Clay
- The Curtain Falls (1934) - Barry Graham
- Crimson Romance (1934) - Adolph
- Sons of Steel (1934) - Roland Chadburne
- Laddie (1935) - Robert Pryor
- On Probation (1935) - Bill Coleman
- Strangers All (1935) - Dick Carter
- Manhattan Butterfly (1935) - Stevens aka Stephen Collier
- Together We Live (1935) - Billy
- Happiness C.O.D. (1935) - Ken Sherridan
- Lady Luck (1936) - Dave Haines
- Sea Spoilers (1936) - Lieut. Commander Mays
- Quality Street (1937) - Lt. Spicer (uncredited)
- Mile-a-Minute-Love (1937) - Bob Jackson
- Dangerous Holiday (1937) - Tom Wilson
- Jungle Menace (1937) - Tom Banning
- Trapped by G-Men (1937) - Dick Withers
- Exiled to Shanghai (1937) - Andrew
- The Higgins Family (1938) - Eddie Davis
- The Duke of West Point (1938) - Committee Captain
- King of the Turf (1939) - Intern
- Hotel Imperial (1939) - Cadet (uncredited)
- Zenobia (1939) - Townsman at Zeke's Recitation (uncredited)
- Those High Grey Walls (1939) - Kibitzer (uncredited)
- Gone with the Wind (1939) - Mounted Officer
- Beyond Tomorrow (1940) - David Chadwick
- The Saint Takes Over (1940) - Shipboard Card Player (uncredited)
- Seven Sinners (1940) - Ensign
- Cheers for Miss Bishop (1941) - Jim Forbes (uncredited)
- Dr. Kildare's Victory (1942) - Mr. Hubbell
- The Dawn Express (1942) - Tom Fielding
- I Live on Danger (1942) - Mac
- The Postman Didn't Ring (1942) - Robert Harwood Jr.
- The Loves of Edgar Allan Poe (1942) - Hugh Pleasant
- King of the Mounties (1942) - Cpl. Hall Ross
- Submarine Alert (1943) - Agent Pomeroy - Fleming's Aide (uncredited)
- Yanks Ahoy (1943) - Ens. Crosby (uncredited)
- Hop Harrigan America's Ace of the Airways (1946) - Hop Harrigan
- The Fabulous Dorseys (1947) - Eddie
- The Farmer's Daughter (1947) - Windor
- The Trespasser (1947) - Bruce Coleman, the Literary Editor
- The Bachelor and the Bobby-Soxer (1947) - Winters
- Messenger of Peace (1947) - Pastor Willie von Adel
- King of the Bandits (1947) - Captain Frank Mason
- Arthur Takes Over (1948) - Lawrence White
- So This Is New York (1948)
- Romance on the High Seas (1948) - Dudley
- Night Wind (1948) - Capt. Kingston (uncredited)
- Miraculous Journey (1948) - (uncredited)
- You Gotta Stay Happy (1948) - Dick Hebert
- The Capture (1950) - Tolin
- Oh! Susanna (1951) - Lieutenant (uncredited)
- Wells Fargo Gunmaster (1951) - Charlie Lannon
- When the Redskins Rode (1951) - Appleby
- Come Fill the Cup (1951) - Hal Ortman
- Radar Men from the Moon (1952) - Ted Richards
- Room for One More (1952) - Milkman (scenes deleted)
- So This Is Love (1953) - Charles, Waiter (uncredited)
- Lucky Me (1954) - Jaguar Owner (uncredited)
- Davy Crockett, King of the Wild Frontier (1955) - Maj. Tobias Norton (archive footage)
- Official Detective (1958, TV Series) - Sam Graves
- Hell's Five Hours (1958) - Minor Role (uncredited)
- Johnny Rocco (1958) - Joe, Police Scientist (uncredited)
- Sea Hunt - Episode Monte Cristo (1958)
- The Big Fisherman (1959) - Minor Role (uncredited)
- Not with My Wife, You Don't! (1966) - Brig. Gen. Swift (uncredited)
- Bonanza (1967-1968, TV Series) - Henshaw / Slatter (2 episodes)
- That Girl (1970, TV Series) - Mr. Macintosh (1 episode)
- The Strongest Man in the World (1975) - Professor
