= Paul Perez (screenwriter) =

American screenwriter (1894–1984)

- Born: Paul Edward Friedenberg; July 18, 1894; New York, New York, USA
- Died: March 13, 1984 (aged 89); Chelsea, Maine, USA
- Occupation(s): Screenwriter, journalist
- Spouse: Molly O'Sullivan

Paul Perez (born Paul Friedenberg) was an American screenwriter active primarily during the 1920s and 1930s; he wrote for both English- and Spanish-language films over the course of his career, and often worked on Westerns. He also had several credits as an actor and editor.

== Biography ==
Paul was born in New York City to art dealer Robert Fridenberg and his wife, Mariam Barnett. He grew up in Manhattan near his extended family of German extraction; as a boy, he accidentally shot a nurse who was attending to his mother in their home while playing with his uncle's gun.

He married England-born actress Molly O'Sullivan in the early 1920s; the pair had one son, Paul Powers Perez. While living in New York City and London, after appearing in a few acting roles and working as a newspaperman, he worked in the publicity department at Universal. By the late 1920s, the family had moved to Los Angeles; by 1926, Perez was employed at Universal as a scenarist, where he was known for writing titles. He later worked as a screenwriter at First National.

Perez was more or less retired by the early 1950s, when he moved to Oaxaca, Mexico, and pursued his passion for photography. He reportedly traveled extensively through southern Mexico, where her purchased masks and other artifacts at local markets.

== Selected filmography ==
As screenwriter:

- La inmaculada (1939)
- The Missing Guest (1938)
- Flaming Frontiers (1938)
- One Man Justice (1937)
- Two-Fisted Sheriff (1937)
- Paradise Express (1937)
- Once a Doctor (1937)
- The Last of the Mohicans (1936)
- Easy Money (1936)
- Brilliant Marriage (1936)
- The Little Red Schoolhouse (1936)
- August Week End (1936)
- Ring Around the Moon (1936)
- Java Seas (1935)
- Te quiero con locura (1935)
- I Give My Heart (1935)
- Piernas de seda (1935)
- Radio Parade of 1935 (1934)
- The Great Defender (1934)
- Smoky (1933)
- No dejes la puerta abierta (1933)
- Melodía prohibida (1933)
- Una viuda romántica (1933)
- One Year Later (1933)
- It's Great to Be Alive (1933)
- El rey de los Gitanos (1933)
- El último varon sobre la tierra (1933)
- El caballero de la noche (1932)
- The Doomed Battalion (1932)
- Hotel Continental (1932)
- Hay que casar al príncipe (1931)
- Their Mad Moment (1931)
- Goldie (1931)
- Camino del infierno (1931)
- La gran jornada (1931)
- Toast of the Legion (1931)
- El valiente (1930)
- The Isle of Lost Ships (1929)
- The Great Divide (1929)
- The Man and the Moment (1929)
- The Girl in the Glass Cage (1929)
- Careers (1929)
- Prisoners (1929)
- Love and the Devil (1929)
- Saturday's Children (1929)
- Why Be Good? (1929)
- Children of the Ritz (1929)
- Weary River (1929)
- His Captive Woman (1929)
- Broadway Fever (1929)
- Three Week-Ends (1928)
- The Gun Runner (1928)
- The Bushranger (1928)
- The Floating College (1928)
- Marriage by Contract (1928)
- Captain Swagger (1928)
- The Wright Idea (1928)
- The Grain of Dust (1928)
- Silent Evidence (1928)
- Green Grass Widows (1928)
- Ladies of the Night Club (1928)
- Chinatown Charlie (1928)
- Flying Luck (1927)
- Home Made (1927)
- Blondes by Choice (1927)
- The Demi-Bride (1927)
- White Pants Willie (1927) (uncredited)
- Frisco Sally Levy (1927) (uncredited)

As actor:

- Just a Woman (1918)
- The Apple-Tree Girl (1917)

As editor:

- Silent Evidence (1928)
