= Cheers of the Crowd =

1935 film directed by Vin Moore

- Directed by: Vin Moore
- Written by: George Waggner
- Produced by: Trem Carr
- Starring: Russell Hopton; Irene Ware; Harry Holman
- Cinematography: Milton R. Krasner
- Edited by: Ernie Leadlay
- Production company: Monogram Pictures
- Distributed by: Monogram Pictures
- Release date: August 5, 1935
- Running time: 60 minutes
- Country: United States
- Language: English

Cheers of the Crowd is a 1935 American drama film directed by Vin Moore and starring Russell Hopton, Irene Ware and Harry Holman.

== Cast ==
- Russell Hopton as Lee Adams
- Irene Ware as Mary Larkin
- Harry Holman as Honest John Brady
- Bradley Page as Blake Walton
- John Quillan as Eddie
- Wade Boteler as Dan O'Reilly
- John Dilson as Barney Booth
- Roberta Gale as Betty O'Reilly
- Betty Blythe as Lil Langdon Walton

== Bibliography ==
- Monaco, James. The Encyclopedia of Film. Perigee Books, 1991.
