= Captain Swagger =

1928 film

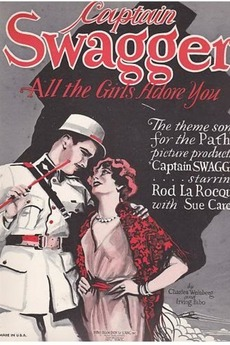
- Film poster
- Directed by: Edward H. Griffith
- Written by: Adelaide Heilbron (adaptation); Paul Perez (titles)
- Story by: Leonard Praskins
- Produced by: Hector Turnbull
- Starring: Rod La Rocque; Sue Carol; Richard Tucker; Victor Potel; Ullrich Haupt
- Cinematography: John J. Mescall
- Edited by: Harold McLernon
- Music by: Josiah Zuro
- Production company: Pathé Exchange
- Distributed by: Pathé Exchange
- Release date: October 14, 1928
- Running time: 65 minutes
- Country: United States
- Languages: Sound (Synchronized) (English intertitles)

Captain Swagger is a 1928 American synchronized sound crime drama film directed by Edward H. Griffith and stars Rod La Rocque. While the film has no audible dialog, it was released with a synchronized musical score with sound effects utilizing the RCA Photophone sound-on-film sound system. The film was released with both the sound-on-disc and sound-on-film formats. The film was produced and distributed by the Pathé Exchange company.

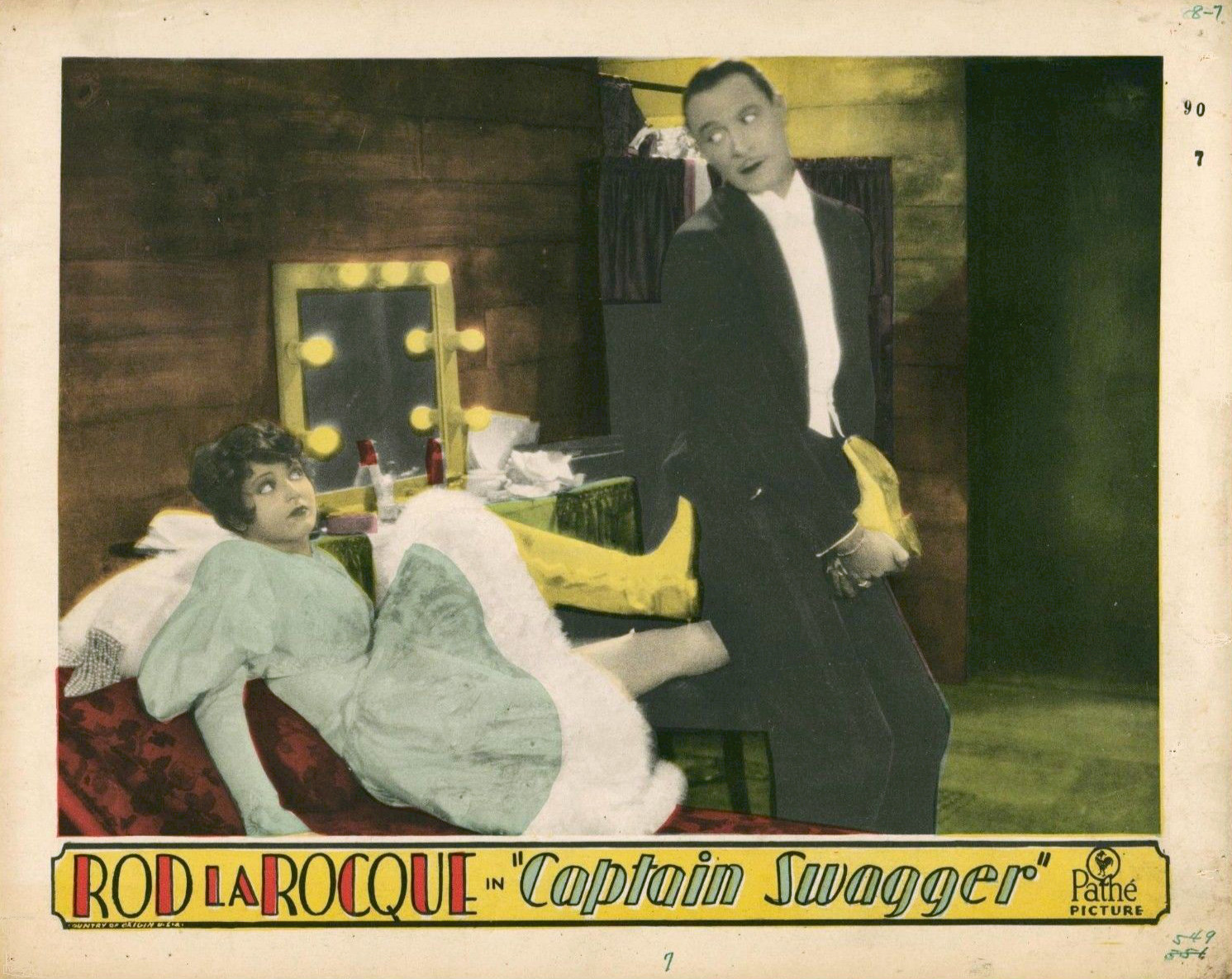
Captain Swagger lobby card

== Plot ==
In war-torn France, 1917, American flying ace Hugh Drummond, known as “Captain Swagger”, earns his nickname for his bold flying and brash demeanor as a member of the Lafayette Escadrille. During a fierce air battle, he downs the notorious German ace Baron Von Stahl and risks his life to drag the enemy flier from the wreckage of his burning plane. In a moment of mutual respect, Von Stahl, realizing his comrades are approaching, hands Drummond his Mauser pistol and allows him to escape safely.

A decade later in 1928, Drummond lives in New York in a lavish studio apartment with his devoted wartime mechanic-turned-valet Jean. The days of heroism are long past; now broke and desperate, Drummond faces eviction. When he rediscovers Von Stahl’s old Mauser pistol, he impulsively resolves to take from the world what he feels it owes him.

His first attempt at robbery in Central Park results in an unexpected encounter. He holds up a Rolls-Royce occupied by drunken socialite Phil Poole and struggling dancer Sue Arnold, who is fending off Phil’s unwanted advances. Taking pity on Sue, Drummond returns the wallet and allows Poole to leave. Sue, alone and unable to pay her rent, gratefully accepts Drummond’s offer to stay in his apartment while he and Jean sleep in a wrecked limousine in the park.

The next day, Drummond attempts to pawn the Mauser pistol and unknowingly enters a pawnshop operated by Von Stahl, now the secret leader of a criminal gang using the shop as a front. Though Drummond doesn’t recognize him, Von Stahl is amused and secretly orders the pawnbroker to lend his former enemy $200, without revealing his identity.

Still believing Hugh is a bandit, Sue agrees to help him "go straight." When she fails to land a solo dancing job at the Viennese nightclub, Drummond convinces the manager to take them on as a dance duo. Their Russian-themed act becomes a success, and though neither admits it aloud, they fall in love.

Trouble returns when Phil Poole resurfaces at the nightclub. Not recognizing Drummond as the man who held him up, Phil woos Sue again and eventually proposes to her, presenting her with a string of pearls. Jealous, Drummond tells Sue that if she marries Poole, he’ll return to crime—and even outlines a detailed plan to rob the Viennese.

Sue refuses Phil’s proposal and prepares to return the pearls. Meanwhile, Drummond goes backstage—but while he’s gone, the Viennese is held up by masked men in a manner strikingly similar to his plan. Sue suspects the worst. In reality, Hugh witnesses the robbery and chases down the masked leader into the club’s cellar. In the ensuing struggle, he shoots the man—only to discover it’s Von Stahl. Remembering the German’s wartime mercy, Hugh helps him escape and returns the stolen loot to the police mid-chase, without revealing his role.

Back at Drummond’s apartment, Von Stahl hides in the dressing room as Sue arrives with Phil, who waits outside. Seeing her pearls on Hugh’s table, Sue is heartbroken, assuming he led the robbery. Unable to explain, Hugh remains silent—until Von Stahl steps out and confesses everything. He takes the pearls and leaves to return them to Poole, advising him “not to wait for the young lady.”

Poole, taking it in stride, quickly diverts his attention to another pretty girl waiting for a taxi.

With the truth revealed, Drummond admits he never was a real criminal, though he regrets that Sue wasn’t the one who reformed him. Smiling, Sue walks into the arms of her swaggering hero.

== Cast ==
- Rod La Rocque as Hugh Drummond ("Captain Swagger")
- Sue Carol as Sue Arnold
- Richard Tucker as Phil Poole
- Victor Potel as Jean
- Ullrich Haupt as Baron Von Stahl
- Maurice Black as Manager, Viennese Club (uncredited)
- Ray Cooke as Chauffeur (uncredited)
- Charlie Hall as Messenger (uncredited)
- William H. O'Brien as Waiter (uncredited)

== Music ==
The film featured a theme song entitled "You're Wonderful" by Paul Ash, Buddy Fields and Jack Gordon. Also featured on the soundtrack is the song entitled "Captain Swagger (All The Girls Adore You)" which was composed by Charles Weinberg and Irving Bibo.

== Production ==
Principal photography on Captain Swagger began on June 4, 1928, with location shooting at Clover Airfield, Santa Monica. The aircraft from Wings (1927) were used in the production. These included the Airco DH.4, SPAD S.XIII and Fokker D.VII.

The film's sets were designed by the art director Edward C. Jewell.

== Reception ==
Mordaunt Hall in his review in the December 24, 1928 issue of The New York Times, commented on the actors: " 'Captain Swagger' is not only exceptionally entertaining but is also well acted. There are many deft touches in various spots; none of the situations are overdone. Mr. La Rocque plays his part in amiable fashion, giving to it the right amount of humor. Miss Carol, of course, is very pretty and in the rôle of Sue Arnold is more than acceptable." More recent reviews, however, by film historians Stephen Pendo and Michael Paris considered the film "pap".

== Preservation ==
Captain Swagger is preserved today at the George Eastman House Motion Picture Collection and a Danish Film Institute Archive facility.

== See also ==
- List of early sound feature films (1926–1929)
