= Federal Agent (film) =

1936 film by Sam Newfield

- Theatrical release poster
- Directed by: Sam Newfield
- Screenplay by: Barry Barringer
- Story by: Robert Ellis
- Produced by: George A. Hirliman
- Starring: William Boyd; Irene Ware; Don Alvarado; Lenita Lane; George Cooper; Charles A. Browne
- Cinematography: Harry Forbes
- Edited by: Charles J. Hunt
- Production company: Winchester Pictures
- Distributed by: Republic Pictures
- Release date: April 14, 1936
- Running time: 59 minutes
- Country: United States
- Language: English

Federal Agent is a 1936 American crime film directed by Sam Newfield and written by Barry Barringer. The film stars William Boyd, Irene Ware, Don Alvarado, Lenita Lane, George Cooper and Charles A. Browne. The film was released on April 14, 1936, by Republic Pictures.

== Cast ==
- William Boyd as Bob Woods
- Irene Ware as Helen Lynch / Helen Gray
- Don Alvarado as Armand Recard
- Lenita Lane as Vilma Kantos Recard
- George Cooper as Agent Wilson
- Charles A. Browne as Mullins
- Hayden Stevenson as Federal Bureau Chief
