= Whispering Smith Speaks =

1935 film directed by David Howard

- Theatrical release poster
- Directed by: David Howard
- Screenplay by: Daniel Jarrett; Don Swift; Rex Taylor; Gilbert Wright
- Story by: Frank H. Spearman
- Produced by: Sol Lesser
- Starring: George O'Brien; Irene Ware; Kenneth Thomson; Maude Allen; Spencer Charters; Victor Potel
- Cinematography: Frank B. Good
- Edited by: Robert O. Crandall
- Production company: Atherton Productions
- Distributed by: 20th Century Fox
- Release date: December 20, 1935
- Running time: 65 minutes
- Country: United States
- Language: English

Whispering Smith Speaks is a 1935 American action film directed by David Howard and written by Daniel Jarrett, Don Swift, Rex Taylor and Gilbert Wright. The film stars George O'Brien, Irene Ware, Kenneth Thomson, Maude Allen, Spencer Charters and Victor Potel. The film was released on December 20, 1935, by 20th Century Fox.

== Cast ==
- George O'Brien as Gordon Harrington Jr. aka John 'Whispering' Smith
- Irene Ware as Nan Roberts
- Kenneth Thomson as J. Wesley Hunt
- Maude Allen as Mrs. Roberts
- Spencer Charters as Cal Stone
- Victor Potel as Bill Prouty
- Edward Keane as Rebstock
- Frank Sheridan as Gordon Harrington Sr.
- William V. Mong as Blake
- Maurice Cass as C. Luddington Colfax
