= Harry Holman =

American actor (1862–1947)

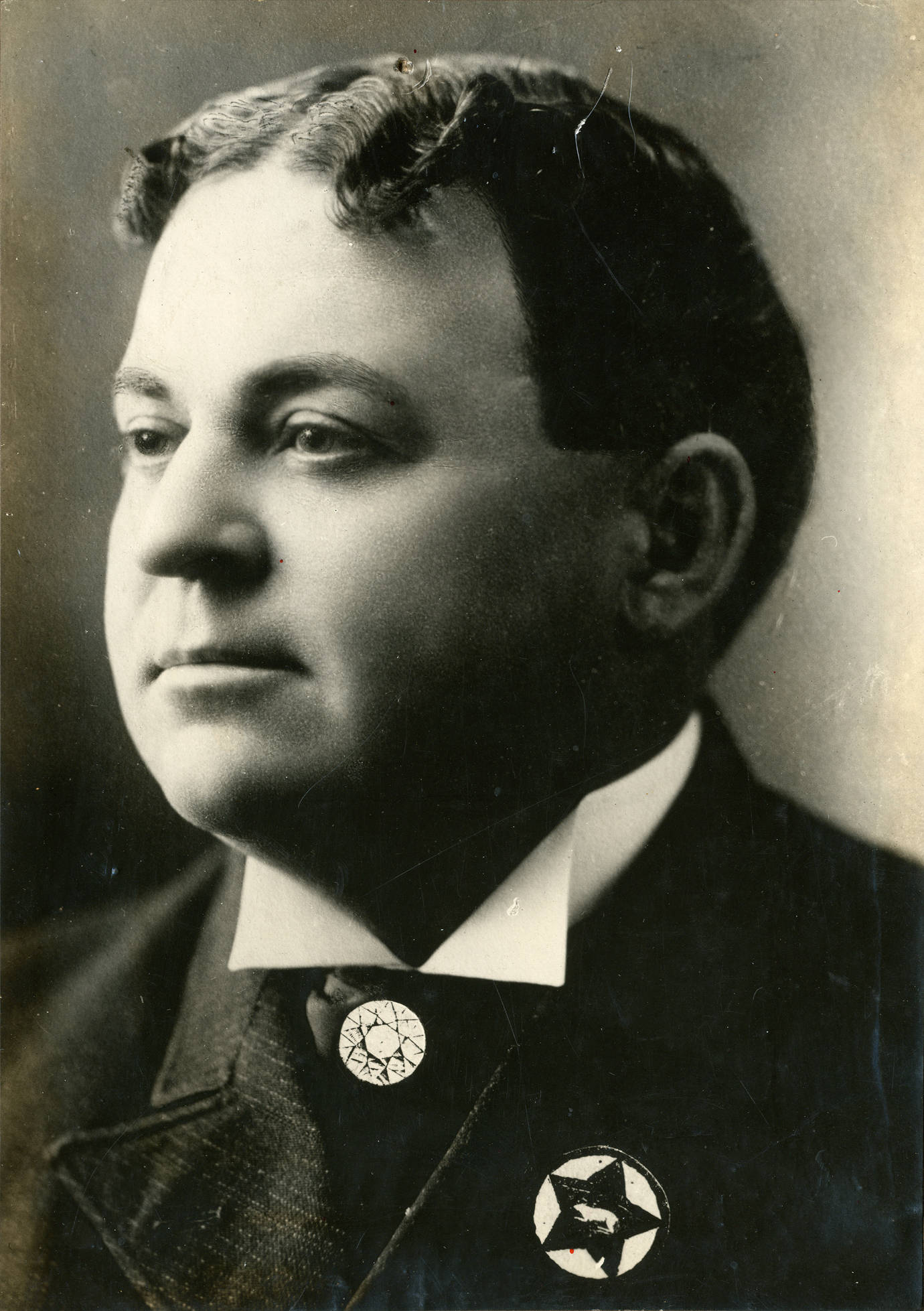
- Holman in 1909
- Born: Harry James Holman; March 15, 1862; Conway, Missouri, U.S.
- Died: May 3, 1947 (aged 85); Hollywood, California, U.S.
- Resting place: Memorial Park Cemetery, Enid, Oklahoma, U.S.
- Other names: Harold Holman
- Occupation: Actor
- Years active: 1903–1947

Harry James Holman (March 15, 1862 – May 3, 1947) was an American actor. He appeared in approximately 130 films from 1923 to 1947.

== Biography ==
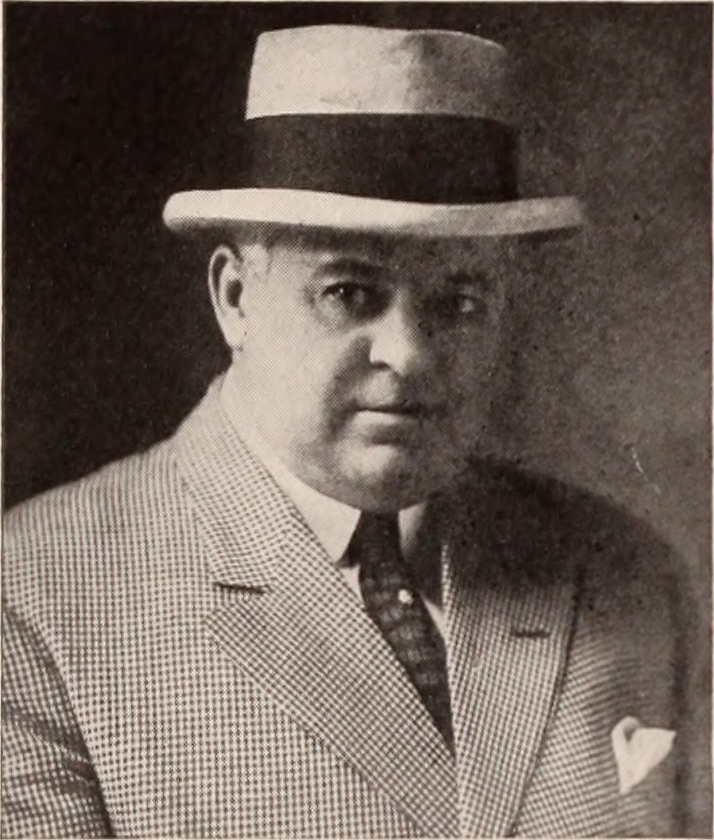
Holman in 1924

Born in Conway, Missouri, Holman dropped out of school in the ninth grade and began seeking work as an actor. In films from at least 1930, he played "a vast array of mayors, justices of the peace, attorneys, millionaires and sugar daddies". He is best known to modern audiences as the desperate Professor Richmond who tries to transform the uncouth Three Stooges into gentlemen in the film Hoi Polloi (1935). He also played frequently in the films of director Frank Capra, for example as the mayor in Meet John Doe (1941) and as the befuddled high school teacher Mr. Partridge in It's a Wonderful Life (1946).

On Broadway, Holman portrayed Wilson Prewitt in The County Chairman (1903) and Caesar Augustus Miggs in Ruled Off the Turf (1906).

Holman performed in vaudeville, heading the Harry Holman Comedy Company, which presented skits including "The Merchant Price". In 1929 or 1932, Holman left vaudeville, where he "was nationally known" for his "Hard-Boiled Hampton" comedy sketch.

On May 3, 1947, Holman died of a heart attack in Hollywood, California.

== Selected filmography ==
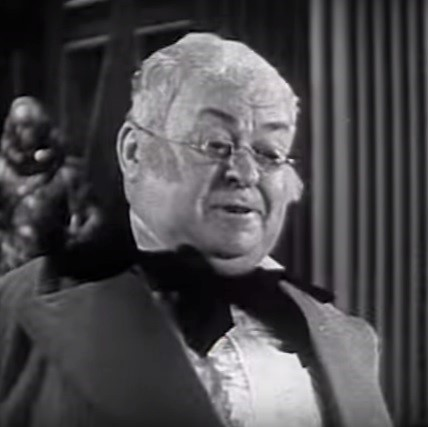
Holman in Oliver Twist (1933)

- The Hunchback of Notre Dame (1923) as Fat Man (uncredited)
- Sporting Blood (1931) as B.H. 'Jerry' Hartwick (uncredited)
- Her Majesty, Love (1931) as Reisenfeld
- Peach O'Reno (1931) as Counselor Jackson #2 (uncredited)
- Forbidden (1932) as Advice-to-the-Lovelorn Columnist (uncredited)
- The Final Edition (1932) as Harry, Newspaperman (uncredited)
- Murders in the Rue Morgue (1932) as Victor Albert Adolph Jules Hugo Louis Dupont, the Landlord (uncredited)
- The Wet Parade (1932) as Wilson Supporter (uncredited)
- Beauty and the Boss (1932) as Hotel Manager (uncredited)
- Symphony of Six Million (1932) as Mr. Holman, Hospital Patient (uncredited)
- So Big (1932) as Country Doctor (uncredited)
- The Dark Horse (1932) as Mr. Jones
- The Final Edition (1932) as Harry
- Doctor X (1932) as Mike, Waterfront Policeman
- American Madness (1932) as Loan-Seeker (uncredited)
- The Conquerors (1932) as Stubby
- Uptown New York (1932) as Pappy, Bartender (uncredited)
- Silver Dollar (1932) as Adams
- Central Park (1932) as Police Captain (uncredited)
- Bachelor Mother (1932) as Judge Yates
- Frisco Jenny (1932) as Old Man Whose Pocket is Picked (uncredited)
- State Fair (1933) as Professor Tyler Cramp, Hog Judge (uncredited)
- Hard to Handle (1933) as Colonel's Associate (uncredited)
- The Woman Accused (1933) as Judge Osgood
- Oliver Twist (1933) as Grimwig
- Phantom Thunderbolt (1933) as Tobias Wingate (uncredited)
- The Circus Queen Murder (1933) as Jim Dugan
- Lucky Dog (1933) as The Business Man
- Song of the Eagle (1933) as 'Here's How!' Drinking Man (uncredited)
- Man Hunt (1933) as Hotel Clerk (uncredited)
- She Had to Say Yes (1933) as Mr. Hoopnagle (uncredited)
- The Stranger's Return (1933) as Dr. Spaulding (uncredited)
- Devil's Mate (1933) as McGee
- Turn Back the Clock (1933) as 1929 Spokesman (uncredited)
- One Year Later (1933) as Fat Man
- Stage Mother (1933) as Mr. Rumley (uncredited)
- The Solitaire Man (1933) as Mr. Elmer Hopkins (uncredited)
- My Woman (1933) as Lou
- Roman Scandals (1933) as Mayor of West Rome (uncredited)
- East of Fifth Avenue (1933) as Sam Cronin
- Lady Killer (1933) as J.B. Roland (uncredited)
- The Meanest Gal in Town (1934) as Brookville's Mayor (uncredited)
- It Happened One Night (1934) as the Auto Camp Manager at the end of the film (uncredited)
- Jimmy the Gent (1934) as Joe Cuney (uncredited)
- The Lost Jungle (1934, Serial) as Maitland, Circus Owner [Ch.1]
- The Line-Up (1934) as Jacob (uncredited)
- A Very Honorable Guy (1934) as Fat Man (uncredited)
- Born to Be Bad (1934) as Man at Bar with Letty (uncredited)
- The Personality Kid (1934) as Diner Counterman (uncredited)
- Fugitive Road (1934) as Burgomaster
- Dames (1934) as Third Druggist (uncredited)
- The Captain Hates the Sea (1934) as Passenger (uncredited)
- I'll Fix It (1941) as Mayor Short (uncredited)
- Men of the Night (1934) as Fat Man at Pig-Stand (uncredited)
- Jealousy (1934) as Man with Dog (uncredited)
- Broadway Bill (1934) as Racetrack Rube (uncredited)
- Fugitive Lady (1934) as Mr. Young (uncredited)
- Night Alarm (1934) as Mayor Wilson
- Million Dollar Baby (1934) as J.D. Pemberton
- The Best Man Wins (1935) as Uncle Ed (uncredited)
- Calling All Cars (1935) as Judge Marlowe
- Folies Bergère de Paris (1935) as Cafe Waiter (uncredited)
- Living on Velvet (1935) as Bartender (uncredited)
- It Happened in New York (1935) as Dockman (uncredited)
- Traveling Saleslady (1935) as Pat O'Connor's Uncle
- In Caliente (1935) as Biggs
- Dante's Inferno (1935) as Jolly Fat Man (uncredited)
- Every Night at Eight (1935) as Col. Ratchfield (uncredited)
- Cheers of the Crowd (1935) as Honest John Brady
- Welcome Home (1935) as Flink
- Jalna (1935) as Mr. Cory, the Publisher (uncredited)
- Manhattan Butterfly (1935)
- Hoi Polloi (1935, Short) as Prof. Richmond (uncredited)
- Here Comes Cookie (1935) as Stuffy
- The Public Menace (1935) as Self-Made Man (scenes deleted)
- Barbary Coast (1935) as Mayor (uncredited)
- Bad Boy (1935) as Mr. Klink (uncredited)
- To Beat the Band (1935) as Chubby Diner (uncredited)
- Your Uncle Dudley (1935) as Banker (uncredited)
- The Lone Wolf Returns (1935) as Masquerade Party Nero (uncredited)
- Murder at Glen Athol (1936) as Campbell Snowden
- Hitch Hike to Heaven (1936) as Philmore Tubbs
- Gentle Julia (1936) as Grandpa Atwater
- Sinner Take All (1936) as Sgt. Berkovitch (uncredited)
- When You're in Love (1937) as a Babbitt Brother (uncredited)
- She's No Lady (1937) as Colonel (uncredited)
- Broadway Melody of 1938 (1937) as Boardinghouse Resident (uncredited)
- Nation Aflame (1937) as Roland Adams
- Professor Beware (1938) as Man Shaving on Boat (uncredited)
- The Arkansas Traveler (1938) as Telegrapher
- I Demand Payment (1938) as Justice of the Peace
- Western Jamboree (1938) as Doc Trimble
- Jesse James (1939) as Engineer (uncredited)
- I Was a Convict (1939) as Martin Harrison
- Let Us Live (1939) as J.B., Businessman Juror (uncredited)
- Hotel Imperial (1939) as Burgomeister (uncredited)
- When Tomorrow Comes (1939) as Mr. Brown (uncredited)
- Slightly Tempted (1940) as Mayor Ammerson
- Meet John Doe (1941) as Mayor Hawkins
- Lady from Louisiana (1941) as Mayor of New Orleans (uncredited)
- The Bride Came C.O.D. (1941) as Judge Sobler
- Manpower (1941) as Justice of the Peace (uncredited)
- Public Enemies (1941) as Fat Reporter
- I Killed That Man (1941) as Lannings
- Call Out the Marines (1942) as Man in wheelchair (uncredited)
- Too Many Women (1942) as John Cartwright
- Mexican Spitfire at Sea (1942) as Mr. Joshua Baldwin
- The Bashful Bachelor (1942) as Knute (uncredited)
- Inside the Law (1942) as Judge Mortimer Gibbs
- The Silver Bullet (1942) as Doc Winslow (uncredited)
- Shadows on the Sage (1942) as Lippy
- Seven Days' Leave (1942) as Percy Gildersleeve, Justice of the Peace
- Tennessee Johnson (1942) as Morley (uncredited)
- Keep 'Em Slugging (1943) as Fat Man (uncredited)
- Idaho (1943) as Man leaving church (uncredited)
- Captive Wild Woman (1943) as Dock Ticket Office Clerk (uncredited)
- Hers to Hold (1943) as Doctor (uncredited)
- Young Ideas (1943) as Harry, Court Clerk (uncredited)
- What a Man! (1944) as Harold D. Prewitt
- The Adventures of Mark Twain (1944) as Drunken Guest (uncredited)
- Allergic to Love (1944) as Club Member (uncredited)
- Swing Hostess (1944) as Fralick
- And Now Tomorrow (1944) as Santa Claus (uncredited)
- Where Do We Go from Here? (1945) as Dutch Councilman (uncredited)
- Badman's Territory (1946) as Hodge
- Without Reservations (1946) as Gas Station Attendant (uncredited)
- My Dog Shep (1946) as The Judge
- It's a Wonderful Life (1946) as high school principal Mr. Partridge (uncredited)
- Magic Town (1947) as Mayor
