= Manhattan Butterfly =

1935 American crime film

- Directed by: Lewis D. Collins
- Written by: F. McGrew Willis; Joseph O'Donnell; Lois Buel
- Produced by: William M. Pizor; Clifford Sanforth
- Starring: Dorothy Granger; William Bakewell; Kenneth Thomson
- Cinematography: James S. Brown Jr.
- Edited by: Roland D. Reed
- Music by: Ray Golden
- Production company: Cameo Pictures
- Distributed by: Imperial Distributing Corporation
- Release date: August 14, 1935
- Running time: 73 minutes
- Country: United States
- Language: English

Manhattan Butterfly is a 1935 American crime film directed by Lewis D. Collins and starring Dorothy Granger, William Bakewell and Kenneth Thomson.

== Cast ==
- Dorothy Granger as Nina Malone
- William Bakewell as Stevens aka Stephen Collier
- Kenneth Thomson as A Gangster
- Dorothy Burgess as Another Singer
- Betty Compson
- Carmelita Geraghty
- Harry Holman
- George Meeker
- Matty Fain
- Alphonse Martell
- Edward Keane
- William Arnold
- Jack Trent

== Bibliography ==
- Michael R. Pitts. Poverty Row Studios, 1929–1940: An Illustrated History of 55 Independent Film Companies, with a Filmography for Each. McFarland & Company, 2005.
