= Victor Potel =

American actor (1889–1947)

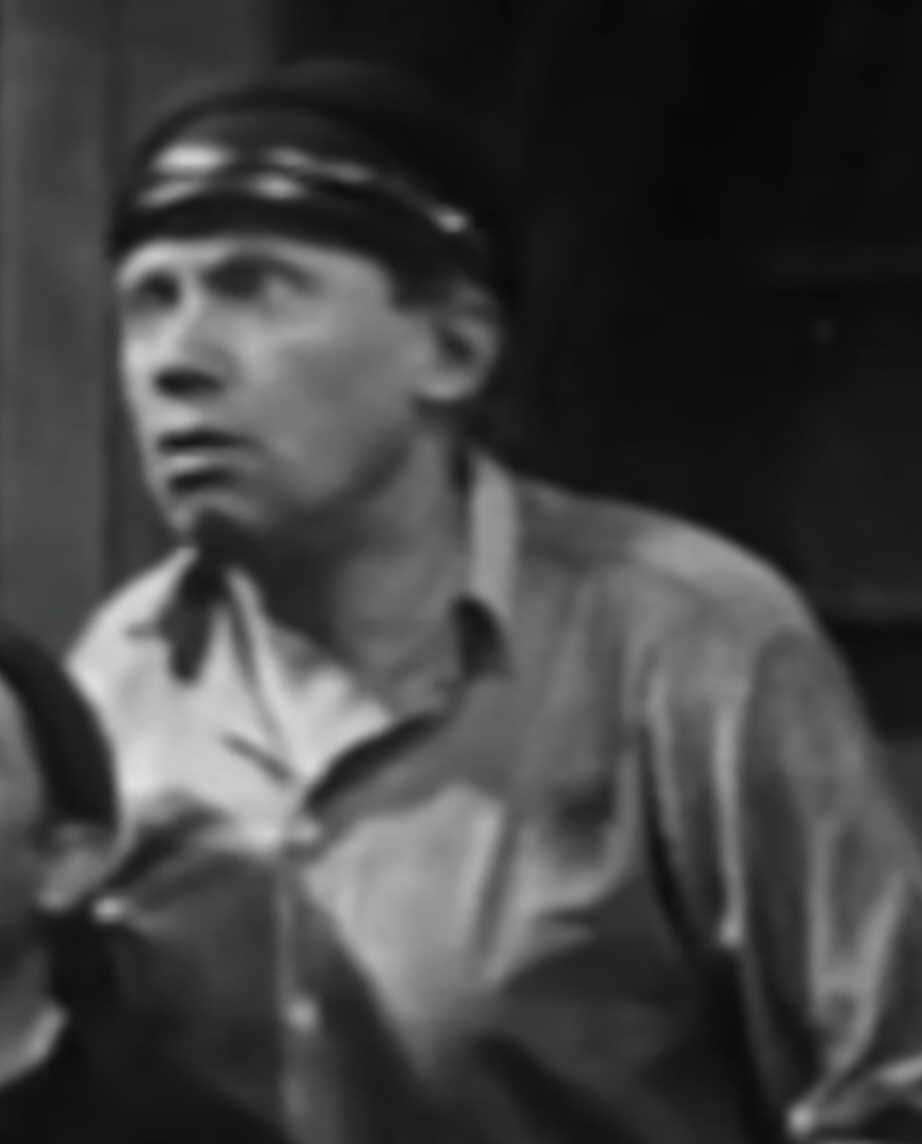
- Potel in Paradise Island (1930)
- Born: October 12, 1889; Lafayette, Indiana, U.S.
- Died: March 8, 1947 (aged 57); Hollywood, California, U.S.
- Occupation: Actor
- Years active: 1910–1947
- Spouse: Mildred "Pam" Ludmilla (m. 1914)

Victor Potel (October 12, 1889 – March 8, 1947) was an American film character actor who began in the silent era and appeared in more than 430 films in his 38-year career.

== Career ==
Victor Potel was born in Lafayette, Indiana, in 1889, and his acting career goes back almost to the beginning of the commercial film industry in the United States. He made his first silent film in 1910, a comedy short filmed in Chicago by Essanay Film Manufacturing Company called A Dog on Business. Potel continued to make films for Essanay, appearing in dozens of films every year, including most of the Broncho Billy series, and played a character called "Slippery Slim" in 80 movies. He also appeared in Universal Pictures' "Snakeville" series.

Potel's first talking picture was Melody of Love, starring Walter Pidgeon, made for Universal in 1928, and in the sound era he continued to work continuously and constantly, playing small parts and sometimes uncredited bit parts, all primarily comic roles due to his height (6 ft 1 in or 1.85 m) and gawkiness.

In addition to acting, on several occasions Potel also wrote and directed. In the 1920s he directed two silent shorts, The Rubber-Neck in 1924 and Action Craver in 1927, and contributed the story for Saxophobia in 1927. In the following decade, in the sound era, he was the dialogue director for The Big Chance (1933), and wrote the story for Inside Information in 1934). In 1935 he provided continuity and dialogue for Million Dollar Haul and the screenplay for Hot Off the Press. In the 1940s, Potel was part of Preston Sturges' unofficial "stock company" of character actors, appearing in nine films written and directed by Sturges.

Potel continued to work right up until his death on March 8, 1947. The final film he worked on, Relentless finished filming on February 28 of that year.

== Selected filmography ==
Silent

- A Dog on Business (1910, Short)
- Across the Plains (1911, Short)
- Alkali Ike's Auto (1911, Short)
- The Good-for-Nothing (1914) - Old Clerk
- His Regeneration (1915, Short) - Pawn Shop Clerk (uncredited)
- Baseball Madness (1917, Short)
- Captain Kidd, Jr. (1919) - Constable Sam
- Full of Pep (1919) - Beanpole
- The Amateur Adventuress (1919) - Gregory Charles Sentel
- The Outcasts of Poker Flat (1919)
- The Petal on the Current (1919) - Skinny Flint
- In Mizzoura (1919) - Dave
- Water, Water, Everywhere (1920) - Steve Brainard
- Mary's Ankle (1920) - Johnny Stokes
- The Heart of a Child (1920) - Charley Peastone
- Billions (1920) - Pushkin
- Bob Hampton of Placer (1921) - Willie McNeil
- One a Minute (1921) - Jingo Pitts
- Lavender and Old Lace (1921) - Joe Pendleton
- At the Sign of the Jack O'Lantern (1922) - The Poet
- I Can Explain (1922) - Will Potter
- Don't Write Letters (1922) - The Lover
- Step on It! (1922) - Noisy Johnson
- The Loaded Door (1922) - Slim
- A Tailor-Made Man (1922) - Peter
- Quincy Adams Sawyer (1922) - Hiram Maxwell
- Refuge (1923) - Alphpmse
- Modern Matrimony (1923) - Junior Rutherford
- Penrod and Sam (1923) - Town Drunkard
- Itching Palms (1923) - The Village Dumbbell
- Tea: With a Kick! (1923) - Bellboy 13
- The Meanest Man in the World (1923) - Lute Boon
- Anna Christie (1923) - Minor Role (uncredited)
- Reno (1923) - Detective McRae
- Women Who Give (1924) - Ephraim Doolittle
- The Law Forbids (1924) - Joel Andrews
- A Self-Made Failure (1924) - Pokey Jones
- Along Came Ruth (1924) - Oscar Sims
- A Lost Lady (1924) - Ivy Peters
- Ten Days (1925) - Constable
- Contraband (1925) - George Bogardus
- Beyond the Border (1925) - Man in Smallpox (credited as Vic Potel)
- Below the Line (1925) - 'Cuckoo' Niles
- What Price Beauty (1925)
- The Bar-C Mystery (1926)
- Morganson's Finish (1926) - Ole Jensen
- The Lodge in the Wilderness (1926) - Goofus
- The Carnival Girl (1926) - Slim
- Racing Romance (1926) - Constable
- Uneasy Payments (1927) - Press Agent
- Special Delivery (1927) - Nip, a detective (scenes deleted)
- The Little Shepherd of Kingdom Come (1928) - Tom Turner
- Lingerie (1928) - Leroy's Buddy
- Captain Swagger (1928) - Jean

Sound

- Melody of Love (1928) - The Gawk
- Border Romance (1929) - Slim
- The Virginian (1929) - Nebrasky
- The Bad One (1930) - Sailor
- Call of the West (1930) - Trig Peters
- Paradise Island (1930) - Swede
- Doughboys (1930) - Svendenburg
- The Virtuous Sin (1930) - Sentry
- De frente, marchen (1930) - Adormidera
- Scandal Sheet (1931) - Reporter (uncredited)
- Ten Cents a Dance (1931) - Smith, a Sailor
- King of the Wild (1931) - Peterson
- The Squaw Man (1931) - Andy
- Partners (1932) - Deputy Lem
- Make Me a Star (1932) - Actor in 'Wide Open Spaces' (uncredited)
- The Purchase Price (1932) - Clyde (uncredited)
- Face in the Sky (1933) - Ed Burns, Carnival Patron (uncredited)
- Hallelujah, I'm a Bum (1933) - The General (uncredited)
- Damaged Lives (1933) - Policeman
- Dancing Lady (1933) - Worker (uncredited)
- Twisted Rails (1934) - Tom Watson
- Inside Information (1934) - Rice - Thin Detective
- Thunder Over Texas (1934) - Dick
- Frontier Days (1934) - Deputy Tex Hatch
- Big Boy Rides Again (1935) - Scarface
- Ruggles of Red Gap (1935) - Curly - Cowboy (uncredited)
- The Marriage Bargain (1935) - Jeff Thompson
- Mississippi (1935) - Guest (uncredited)
- The Drunkard (1935) - Farmer Gates
- The Cowboy and the Bandit (1935) - Lanky - Henchman (uncredited)
- Million Dollar Haul (1935) - Schultz - Florist / Henchman (uncredited)
- Whispering Smith Speaks (1935) - Bill Prouty
- Hard Rock Harrigan (1935) - 'Big' Oscar
- Lady Tubbs (1935) - Slim (uncredited)
- The Adventures of Rex and Rinty (1935, Serial) - Kinso, Royal Guard Commander [Chs. 1, 10-12]
- Western Frontier (1935) - Slim (uncredited)
- Trails End (1935) - Red
- The Girl Friend (1935) - Small Town Farmer (uncredited)
- Waterfront Lady (1935) - Alex
- She Couldn't Take It (1935) - Farmer (uncredited)
- Shipmates Forever (1935) - Radio Fan (uncredited)
- Barbary Coast (1935) - Wilkins (uncredited)
- Moonlight on the Prairie (1935) - Tall Cowboy (uncredited)
- The Last of the Clintons (1935) - Jed Clinton
- The Fighting Marines (1935, Serial) - Henchman - Fake Native Chief [Ch. 12]
- Gun Play (1935) - Brawler (uncredited)
- Hot Off the Press (1935)
- The Broken Coin (1936)
- Man Hunt (1936) - Townsman Pointing Out Shefiff's Office (uncredited)
- The Milky Way (1936) - Todd Fight Spectator (uncredited)
- Yellow Dust (1936) - Jugger - the Bartender
- The Music Goes 'Round (1936) - Garage Attendant (uncredited)
- Song of the Saddle (1936) - Little Casino
- Three Godfathers (1936) - 'Buck Tooth'
- O'Malley of the Mounted (1936) - Gabby - the Cook
- Down to the Sea (1936) - Andy
- Fury (1936) - Jorgeson - Barber Shop Customer (uncredited)
- We Went to College (1936) - Boatman (uncredited)
- The Captain's Kid (1936) - Deputy Jake Hutchinson
- Four Days' Wonder (1936) - Postman (uncredited)
- Arizona Mahoney (1936) - Stagecoach Helper Elmer (uncredited)
- Laughing at Trouble (1936) - Lem Parker (uncredited)
- Lady from Nowhere (1936) - Abner
- God's Country and the Woman (1937) - Turpentine
- Racing Lady (1937) - Mr. Mitchell (uncredited)
- Two Gun Law (1937) - Cassius
- A Day at the Races (1937) - Horn Blower (uncredited)
- Married Before Breakfast (1937) - Tall Hobo Being Shaved (uncredited)
- White Bondage (1937) - Luke Stacey (uncredited)
- Western Gold (1937) - Jasper
- On Such a Night (1937) - Louisiana Sharecropper (uncredited)
- Small Town Boy (1937) - Abner Towner
- Adventure's End (1937) - Tall Sailor (uncredited)
- Swing Your Lady (1938) - Clem (uncredited)
- The Girl of the Golden West (1938) - Lem - Stagecoach Driver (uncredited)
- On the Great White Trail (1938) - Lyons (uncredited)
- The Strange Case of Dr. Meade (1938) - Steve
- Stand Up and Fight (1939) - Coach Driver (uncredited)
- Let Freedom Ring (1939) - Ole Swensen - 2nd Swede (uncredited)
- Down the Wyoming Trail (1939) - Slim (uncredited)
- The Housekeeper's Daughter (1939) - Suspect (uncredited)
- Heaven with a Barbed Wire Fence (1939) - Ranch Hand (uncredited)
- Blondie Brings Up Baby (1939) - Lars (uncredited)
- Rovin' Tumbleweeds (1939) - Man in Store
- Chip of the Flying U (1939) - Station Agent (uncredited)
- Slightly Honorable (1939) - Gasoline Station Proprietor (uncredited)
- West of Carson City (1940) - Ranch Hand Gabby (uncredited)
- Young Tom Edison (1940) - Mr. Tompkins (uncredited)
- Enemy Agent (1940) - George (uncredited)
- Three Faces West (1940) - Postman (uncredited)
- The Great McGinty (1940) - Cook (uncredited)
- Girl from God's Country (1940) - Barber
- The Villain Still Pursued Her (1940) - Policeman (uncredited)
- Christmas in July (1940) - Davenola Salesman
- Li'l Abner (1940) - Fantastic Brown
- Trail of the Vigilantes (1940) - Conductor (uncredited)
- Road Show (1941) - Rube (uncredited)
- The Lady Eve (1941) - Third Ship's Waiter (uncredited)
- A Girl, a Guy and a Gob (1941) - Bystander Eating Popcorn (uncredited)
- Las Vegas Nights (1941) - Cowboy Onlooker at Slot Machine (uncredited)
- Pot o' Gold (1941) - Olaf Svenson (uncredited)
- The Devil and Miss Jones (1941) - Attendant at First Bath House (uncredited)
- The Lady from Cheyenne (1941) - Lem (uncredited)
- Ride on Vaquero (1941) - Ole (uncredited)
- The Big Store (1941) - Swedish Blonde Children's Father (uncredited)
- Puddin' Head (1941) - Hillbilly
- New Wine (1941) - Minor Role (uncredited)
- Never Give a Sucker an Even Break (1941) - Russian Magistrate Clines (uncredited)
- Nothing but the Truth (1941) - Pedestrian (scenes deleted)
- Birth of the Blues (1941) - Trumpet Player in Beer Garden (uncredited)
- Look Who's Laughing (1941) - Mr. Bagworthy, the Postman (uncredited)
- Sullivan's Travels (1941) - Cameraman
- The Palm Beach Story (1942) - Mr. McKeewie
- The Man in the Trunk (1942) - Deaf Floor Man (uncredited)
- The Valley of Vanishing Men (1942, Serial) - Townsman (uncredited)
- The Sky's the Limit (1943) - Joe - Second Bartender (uncredited)
- The Good Fellows (1943) - Branders (uncredited)
- Girl Crazy (1943) - Station Master (uncredited)
- The Miracle of Morgan's Creek (1943) - Newspaper Editor
- It Happened Tomorrow (1944) - Joe (uncredited)
- The Great Moment (1944) - First Dental Patient
- Hail the Conquering Hero (1944) - Progressive Bandleader (uncredited)
- Kansas City Kitty (1944) - Painter (uncredited)
- Goin' to Town (1944) - (uncredited)
- Can't Help Singing (1944) - Guide (uncredited)
- Strange Illusion (1945) - Mac - Game Warden
- A Medal for Benny (1945) - Pepster (uncredited)
- Flame of Barbary Coast (1945) - Train Fireman (uncredited)
- Rhythm Round-Up (1945) - Slim Jensen
- Captain Tugboat Annie (1945) - Swenson
- The Glass Alibi (1946) - Gas Attendant
- They Made Me a Killer (1946) - Willoughby (uncredited)
- The Return of Rusty (1946) - Gas Station Attendant (uncredited)
- Heldorado (1946) - Desert Springs Station Agent (uncredited)
- The Shocking Miss Pilgrim (1947) - Speaker (uncredited)
- Calendar Girl (1947) - Fireman (uncredited)
- The Sin of Harold Diddlebock (1947) - Prof. Potelle
- The Devil Thumbs a Ride (1947) - Minnie's Old Man (uncredited)
- Ramrod (1947) - Burch Nellice
- The Egg and I (1947) - Crowbar
- The Farmer's Daughter (1947) - Farmer with Destroyed Property (uncredited)
- Yankee Fakir (1947) - Contest Chairman (uncredited)
- The Millerson Case (1947) - Hank Nixon (uncredited)
- Relentless (1948) - Barfly (uncredited)
