= False Pretenses =

1935 film

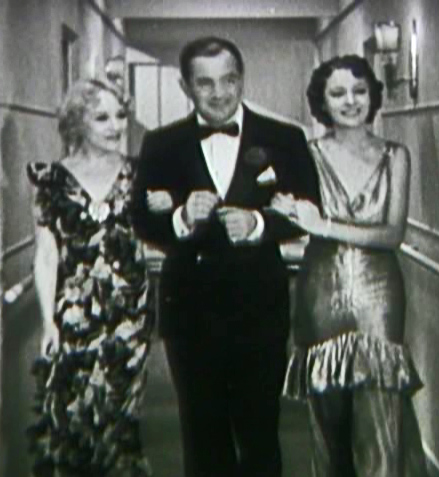
- Still with Betty Compson, Sidney Blackmer, and Irene Ware.
- Directed by: Charles Lamont
- Written by: Ewart Adamson; Betty Burbridge
- Produced by: George R. Batcheller
- Starring: Irene Ware; Sidney Blackmer; Betty Compson
- Cinematography: M. A. Anderson
- Edited by: Roland D. Reed
- Production company: Chesterfield Pictures
- Distributed by: Chesterfield Pictures
- Release date: October 22, 1935
- Running time: 68 minutes
- Country: United States
- Language: English

False Pretenses is a 1935 American romantic comedy film directed by Charles Lamont and starring Irene Ware.

== Plot ==
When Mary Beekman (Irene Ware) loses her waitress job after a fight with her loutish boyfriend, trucker Mike O’Reilly (Edward Gargan), she stands at a bridge on a windy night, loses her pay check to the wind and leans over the guardrail to catch it, but socialite Kenneth Alden (Sidney Blackmer) catches her. He’s lost everything that is not already mortgaged. Both down on their luck, they assume that the other is there to jump off the bridge.

Instead, Mary has an idea. If Ken sells shares to a syndicate of his wealthy friends, in a phoney beauty product, they’ll have enough money for some clothes to pass Mary off in society long enough to meet and marry a wealthy bachelor. Then, they can pay everyone back with interest. The con might work, except that Ken has too much integrity to marry Clarissa Stanhope (Betty Compson) for money, and Mary is beginning to see his point when she falls for Pat (Russell Hopton), who has secrets of his own.

The plot boils over when Mike shows up to spill the beans. Pat's valet is a thief, who promised not to act foolishly, but escapes with a stolen tiara. Meanwhile, Mary plans to leave, so she shares a taxi to the station with Pat's valet. After a police chase, Mary is hauled off to the police station.

It looks like no one is going to end up with anything, but a bad reputation, but, what starts out dramatically ends comically, with everyone getting what he or she really wants out of life.

== Cast ==
- Irene Ware as Mary Beekman
- Sidney Blackmer as Kenneth Alden (as Sydney Blackmer)
- Betty Compson as Clarissa Stanhope
- Russell Hopton as Pat Brennan
- Edward Gargan as Mike O'Reilly
- Ernest Wood as Tiffany Cortland
- Lucy Beaumont as Miss Milgrim
- Marshall Ruth as Gardner
- Dot Farley as Mrs. Smythe
