= Ewart Adamson =

Scottish screenwriter (1882–1945)

- Born: 23 October 1882; Dundee, Scotland
- Died: 28 November 1945 (aged 63); Hollywood, California, US
- Other name: Dayle Douglas
- Years active: 1922 - 1944

Ewart Adamson (23 October 1882 – 28 November 1945) was a Scottish screenwriter. He wrote for more than 120 films between 1922 and 1944. He was born in Dundee, Scotland, and died in Hollywood, California.

== Selected filmography ==
- South of Suva (1922)
- The Silent Guardian (1925)
- Go Straight (1925)
- The Night Cry (1926)
- Flashing Fangs (1926)
- The Impostor (1926)
- The Jade Cup (1926)
- Flaming Fury (1926)
- Home Struck (1927)
- Not for Publication (1927)
- The Desert Bride (1928)
- Dead Man's Curve (1928)
- The Perfect Crime (1928)
- Barnum Was Right (1929)
- Niagara Falls (1932)
- Guests Wanted (1932)
- The Gold Ghost (1934)
- Allez Oop (1934)
- False Pretenses (1935)
- In Paris, A.W.O.L. (1936)
- House of Errors (1942)
- Haunted Harbor (1944)
