= Irene Ware =

American actress (1910–1993)

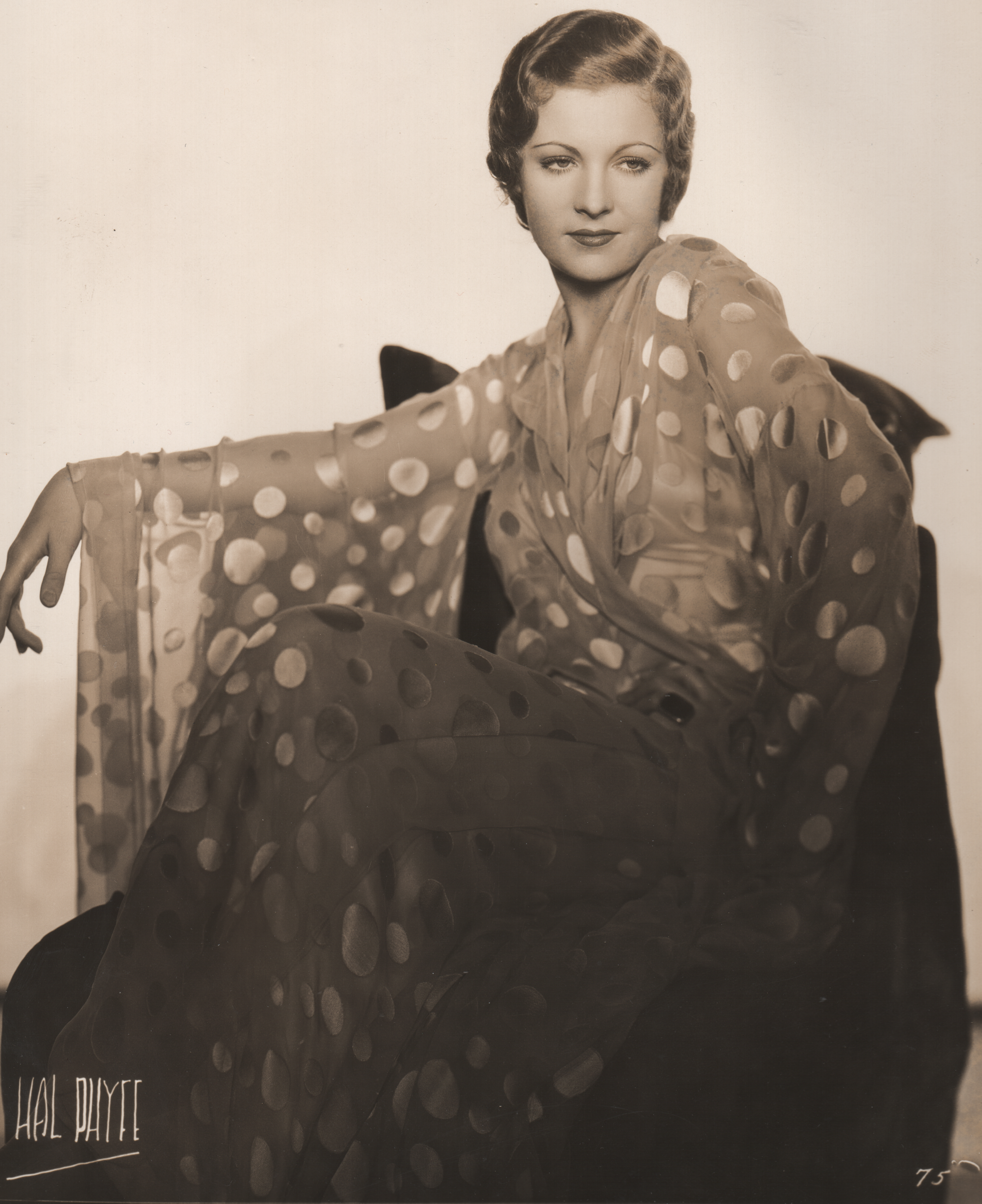
- Irene Ware in Chandu the Magician (1932)
- Born: November 6, 1910; Albany, New York, U.S.
- Died: March 11, 1993 (aged 82); Orange, California, U.S.
- Occupation: Actress
- Years active: 1929–1993
- Spouse(s): John Meehan Jr. (divorced); Fred Campbell
- Children: 2

Irene Ware (born Irene Catherine Ahlberg; November 6, 1910 – March 11, 1993) was an American actress. She was a beauty queen and showgirl before appearing in 29 films between 1932 and 1940, and is mostly remembered for her roles as Princess Nadji in Chandu the Magician (1932) with Edmund Lowe and Bela Lugosi, and as Boris Karloff's and Lugosi's leading lady in 1935's The Raven.

== Early years ==
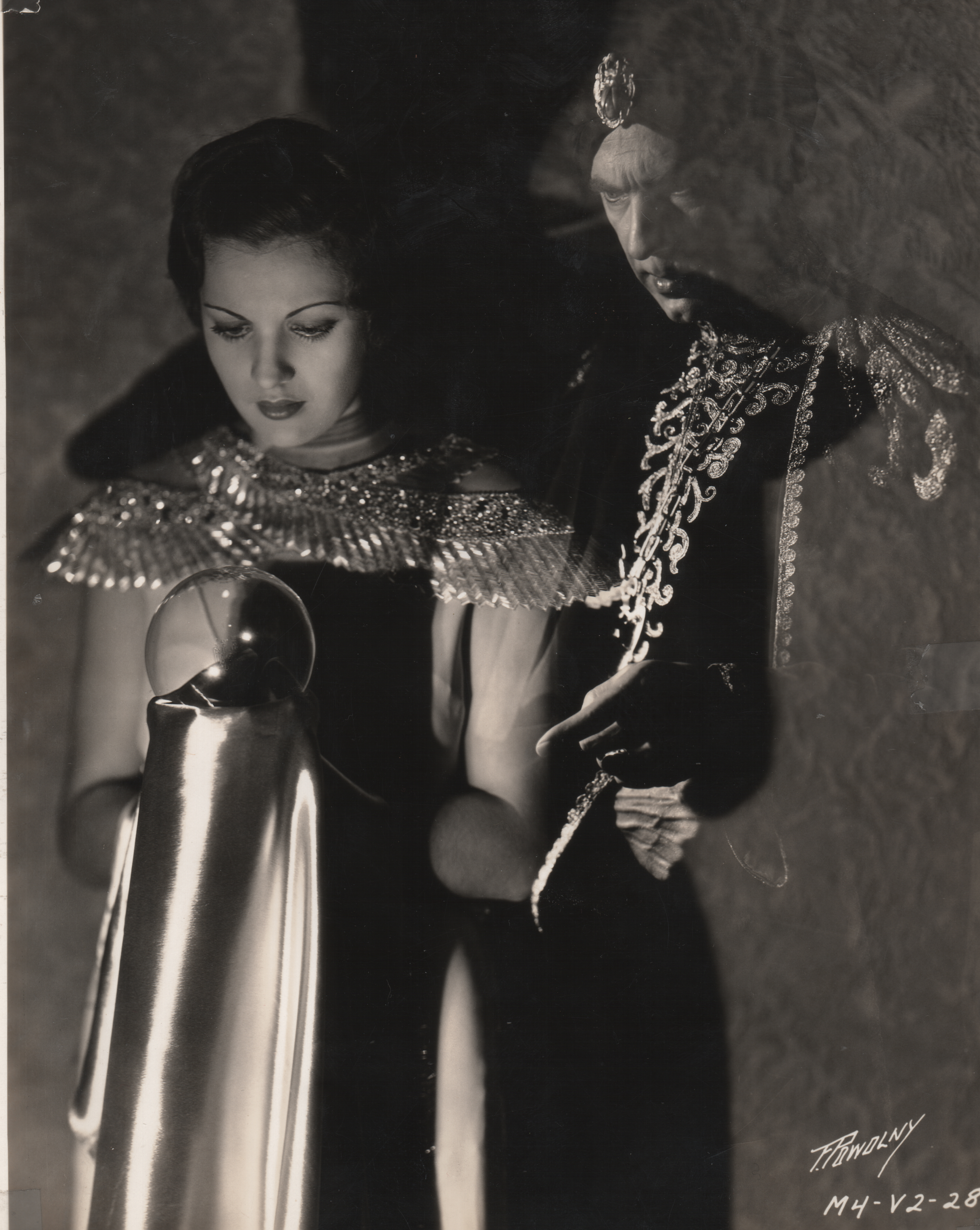
Irene Ware and Bela Lugosi in Chandu the Magician (1932).

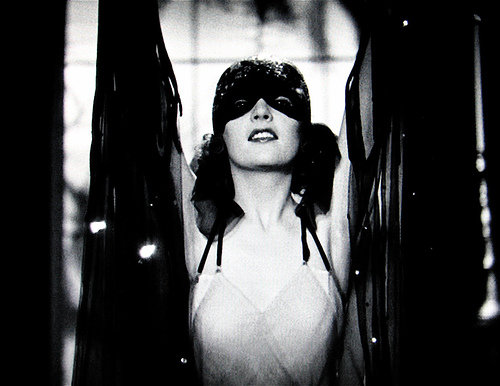
Irene Ware in The Raven (1935)

Irene Catherine Ahlberg was born November 6, 1910, in Albany, New York. Her father, Ernest Ahlberg, born in Sweden, managed a saloon. Her mother, Anna Freya, born in New York to Austrian parents, was a real estate agent. She lived in New York and Los Angeles. Her sister, Anita, was an artist.

== Beauty queen ==
As an 18-year-old stenographer, (5`6"/1.68 cm tall), Ware was crowned Miss Greater New York, then Miss United States in 1929, and the same year was first runner-up for the title of Miss Universe at a pageant held in Galveston, Texas. She also won $1,000. ("Miss United States" was an unofficial alternative to the Miss America Pageant, which was not held in 1929. The Miss Universe contest of the 1920s was not connected to the current Miss Universe system, which was launched in 1952.)

== Acting ==
Ware debuted on stage in a revue at the Metropolitan Theatre Boston in July 1929, She performed in Early Carroll's Sketch Book (1929) and in the 1930 and 1931 versions of Earl Carroll's Vanities on Broadway. She was then contracted to Fox Studios and moved to Hollywood, changing her name to Irene Ware. Her first movie was Society Girl, in 1932 at Fox Film Corporation uncredited together with names like James Dunn, Peggy Shannon and Spencer Tracy. The second film, which quickly made her a star, was Chandu the Magician, also released in 1932 and directed by Marcel Varnel.

== Personal life ==
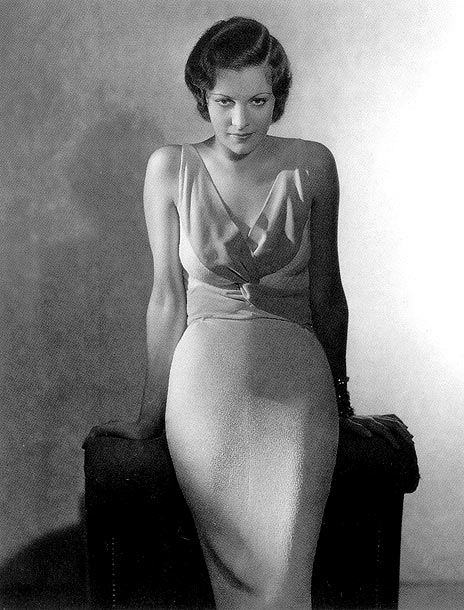
Irene Ware

Ware's first marriage was to American screenwriter John Meehan, Jr., who won three Oscars for his work. Her second marriage was to federal Judge Fred Campbell. She left the industry to become a mother to their two children, John and Deirdre Meehan.

Author Gregory William Mank wrote in Bela Lugosi and Boris Karloff the Expanded Story of a Haunting Collaboration, (McFarland & Company), (2010), that Ware lived in Encinitas; had "Severe dementia"; and that she died in the evening, of "Pneumonia", in the Western Medical Centre, Santa Ana.

== Filmography ==
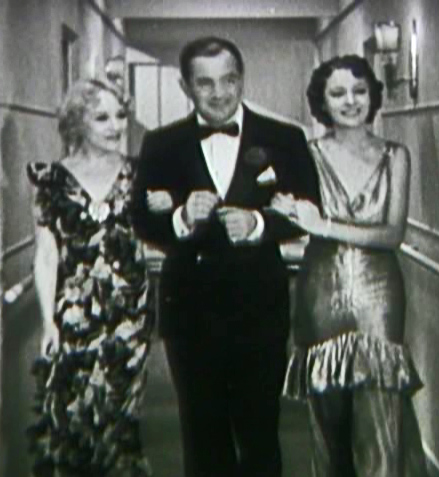
False Pretenses (1935) Betty Compson, Sidney Blackmer, and Irene Ware

- 1932: Society Girl – (uncredited)
- 1932: Chandu the Magician – Princess Nadji
- 1932: Six Hours to Live – The Prostitute
- 1933: Humanity – Olive Pelton
- 1933: Brief Moment – Joan
- 1933: My Weakness – Eve Millstead
- 1934: Moulin Rouge – show girl (uncredited)
- 1934: Orient Express – Janet Pardoe
- 1934: Let's Talk It Over – Sandra
- 1934: The Affairs of Cellini – Daughter Of The House Of Bocci
- 1934: You Belong To Me – Lila Lacey
- 1934: King Kelly of the U.S.A. – Princess Tania aka Catherine Bell
- 1935: Rendezvous at Midnight – Myra
- 1935: Night Life of the Gods – Diana
- 1935: Whispering Smith Speaks – Nan Roberts
- 1935: The Raven – Jean Thatcher
- 1935: Cheers of the Crowd – Mary Larkin
- 1935: Happiness C.O.D. – Carroll Sherridan
- 1935: False Pretenses – Mary Beekman
- 1936: The Dark Hour – Elsa Carson
- 1936: Murder at Glen Athol – Jane Maxwell
- 1936: O'Malley of the Mounted – Edith "Edie" Hyland
- 1936: In Paris, A.W.O.L. – Constance
- 1936: Federal Agent – Helen Lynch / Helen Gray
- 1936: Gold Diggers of 1937 – Irene (Sally´s pal)
- 1937: The Live Wire – Jane
- 1938: No Parking – Olga
- 1938: Around the Town – Norma Wyngold
- 1940: Outside the Three-Mile Limit – Dorothy Kenney (final film role)
