= M. A. Anderson =

American cinematographer (1893–1958)

- Born: September 15, 1893; Chicago, Illinois, United States
- Died: March 8, 1958 (aged 64); Los Angeles, California, United States
- Other name: Milford Arthur Andersen
- Occupation: Cinematographer
- Years active: 1928–1949 (film)

M. A. Anderson (September 15, 1893 – March 8, 1958) was an American cinematographer. He worked for the Poverty Row studio Chesterfield Pictures during the 1930s.

== Partial filmography ==
- South of Panama (1928)
- Oklahoma Cyclone (1930)
- Lotus Lady (1930)
- Night Life in Reno (1931)
- Forbidden Company (1932)
- The Secrets of Wu Sin (1932)
- By Appointment Only (1933)
- Twin Husbands (1933)
- In the Money (1933)
- Dance Girl Dance (1933)
- Cross Streets (1934)
- The Ghost Walks (1934)
- The Quitter (1934)
- Sons of Steel (1934)
- Symphony of Living (1935)
- False Pretenses (1935)
- The Dark Hour (1936)
- August Weekend (1936)
- Slander House (1938)

== Bibliography ==
- Michael R. Pitts. Poverty Row Studios, 1929–1940: An Illustrated History of 55 Independent Film Companies, with a Filmography for Each. McFarland & Company, 2005.
