= George R. Batcheller =

American film producer

- Born: 1892; Providence, Rhode Island, United States
- Died: October 5, 1938 (aged 45–46); Pelham, New York, United States
- Occupation: Producer
- Years active: 1925 - 1936 (film)

George R. Batcheller (1892–1938) was an American film producer. He ran the low-budget studio Chesterfield Pictures in the 1930s.

== Selected filmography ==
- The Last Chance (1926)
- The Secrets of Wu Sin (1932)
- Slightly Married (1932)
- Women Won't Tell (1932)
- Murder on the Campus (1933)
- Rainbow Over Broadway (1933)
- Love Is Dangerous (1933)
- Cross Streets (1934)
- The Quitter (1934)
- In Love with Life (1934)
- The Lady in Scarlet (1935)
- False Pretenses (1935)
- A Shot in the Dark (1935)
- The Dark Hour (1936)
- House of Secrets (1936)
- Below the Deadline (1936)
- Red Lights Ahead (1936)

== Bibliography ==
- Michael R. Pitts. Poverty Row Studios, 1929–1940: An Illustrated History of 55 Independent Film Companies, with a Filmography for Each. McFarland & Company, 2005.
