= Roland D. Reed =

American film producer (1894–1972)

- Born: July 7, 1894; New York, New York, United States
- Died: July 15, 1972 (aged 78); Los Angeles, California, United States
- Occupations: Editor, producer, director
- Years active: 1923-1963 (film)

Roland D. Reed (July 7, 1894 – July 15, 1972) was an American film editor, producer and director. He worked on many films for the low-budget Chesterfield Pictures and later started Roland Reed Productions, Inc. that shut down in November 1956. In addition to TV series, Reed made industrial and Christian films as well as television commercials that were filmed at Hal Roach Studios.

== Personal life ==
The son of Daniel Morton Reed and Ella G. Hulse, Roland Daniel Reed was born in Middletown, New York. He had three wives, Laura Muzzio (1913), Dorothy Venita Smith (1930), and Dorothy Belle Eddy (1935).

== Selected filmography ==
=== Theatrical ===
- The House of Terror (1928) 10-chapter serial, now considered lost
- Notorious but Nice (1933)
- Love Is Dangerous (1933)
- The Ghost Walks (1934)
- Death from a Distance (1935)
- Manhattan Butterfly (1935)
- False Pretenses (1935)
- Red Lights Ahead (1936)
- In Paris, A.W.O.L. (1936)
- August Weekend (1936)

=== Television ===
- The Stu Erwin Show (1950–55)
- ABC Mystery Theater (1951–54)
- Beulah (1950–53)
- My Little Margie (1952–1955)
- Rocky Jones, Space Ranger (1954)
- Waterfront (1955)

== Bibliography ==
- Michael R. Pitts. Poverty Row Studios, 1929–1940: An Illustrated History of 55 Independent Film Companies, with a Filmography for Each. McFarland & Company, 2005.
