= Chesterfield Pictures =

Defunct film production company

Company's logo in 1931.

Chesterfield Motion Picture Corporation, generally shortened to Chesterfield Pictures, was an American film production company of the 1920s and 1930s. The company head was George R. Batcheller, and the company worked in tandem with its sister studio, Invincible Pictures Corporation, which was led by Maury Cohen. The production company never owned its own studio and rented space at other studios, primarily Universal Pictures and RKO.

Batcheller's target market was neighborhood theaters that weren't part of the big studios' theater chains. These smaller houses usually showed second- or third-run movies, unable to afford to show the newest, more expensive feature films. Batcheller serviced these smaller theaters with smaller movies: low-budget productions that cost theater owners much less than big-studio releases, and could play first-run as new attractions. This was an ambitious policy in the days before double features and "B" pictures, when individual movies were featured as the main attraction in movie theaters. Given Chesterfield's budget constraints, Batcheller could not afford to pay the high salaries commanded by major-studio performers, and relied on less expensive "name" talent. Some were former stars of the silent screen, like Alice Day, Marceline Day, Erich von Stroheim, Evelyn Brent, Clara Kimball Young, Betty Compson, and Glenn Tryon. Others were currently established featured players who became stars, like Myrna Loy, Betty Grable, Charles Starrett, and Andy Clyde. Batcheller also relied on a small staff of busy directors: Frank R. Strayer, Richard Thorpe, Phil Rosen, and Charles Lamont.

Chesterfield was one of a number of Poverty Row studios taken over by Herbert Yates in 1935 and merged into his newly formed Republic Pictures, in an attempt to create a studio with enough strength and appeal to compete with the major studios. Republic achieved this goal -- albeit on a smaller scale, much as Chesterfield had -- and lasted more than 20 years.

George Batcheller died in 1938. In 1941 his son, George R. Batcheller, Jr., became head of the PRC studio and used his father's Chesterfield strategy there.

== See also ==
- List of Chesterfield Pictures films

== Bibliography ==
- Balio Tino. Grand Design: Hollywood as a Modern Business Entertprise 1930-1939. University of California Press, 1995.
- Pitts, Michael R. Poverty Row Studios, 1929–1940: An Illustrated History of 55 Independent Film Companies, with a Filmography for Each. McFarland & Company, 2005.
