= House of Secrets =

House of Secrets may refer to:

== Film ==
- The House of Secrets (1929 film), a 1929 American mystery film
- House of Secrets (1936 film), an American film
- House of Secrets (1956 film), a British film directed by Guy Green
- House of Secrets, a 1993 American television film directed by Mimi Leder

== Literature ==
=== Comics ===
- House of Secrets (DC Comics), several mystery-suspense, anthology comic book series published by DC Comics
- House of Secrets (Vertigo), an occult and horror-themed comic book series published by Vertigo

=== Novels ===
- The House of Secrets (novel), a 1926 novel by Sydney Horler
- The House of Secrets, a 1963 novel by Nina Bawden
- House of Secrets, a 1971 novel by Rosemary Timperley
- A House of Secrets, a 1991 novel by Patti Davis
- House of Secrets, a 1994 novel by Jean Saunders, writing as Sally Blake
- House of Secrets, a 1995 novel by James A. Moore and Kevin Andrew Murphy
- House of Secrets, a 1996 novel by Beverly Lewis
- House of Secrets (novel), a 2013 novel by Chris Columbus and Ned Vizzini
- The House of Secrets, a 2016 novel by Tod Goldberg and Brad Meltzer
- The House of Secrets, a 2017 novel by Sarra Manning
- House of Secrets, a 2018 novel by V. C. Andrews

== Television ==
- "House of Secrets", an episode of Dominick Dunne's Power, Privilege, and Justice
- "House of Secrets", an episode of House of Anubis
- "House of Secrets", an episode of Maelstrom

== Other uses ==
- House of Secrets (album), a 2004 music album by OTEP

== See also ==
- The House of the Secret, the title of two unrelated novels; the 1910 book by Katharine Tynan and the 1911 book by Claude Farrère
- The Secret House, a 1917 thriller novel by Edgar Wallace
- House of Secrets: The Burari Deaths, a 2021 docuseries by Netflix
