= The Great Deception =

1926 film by Howard Higgin

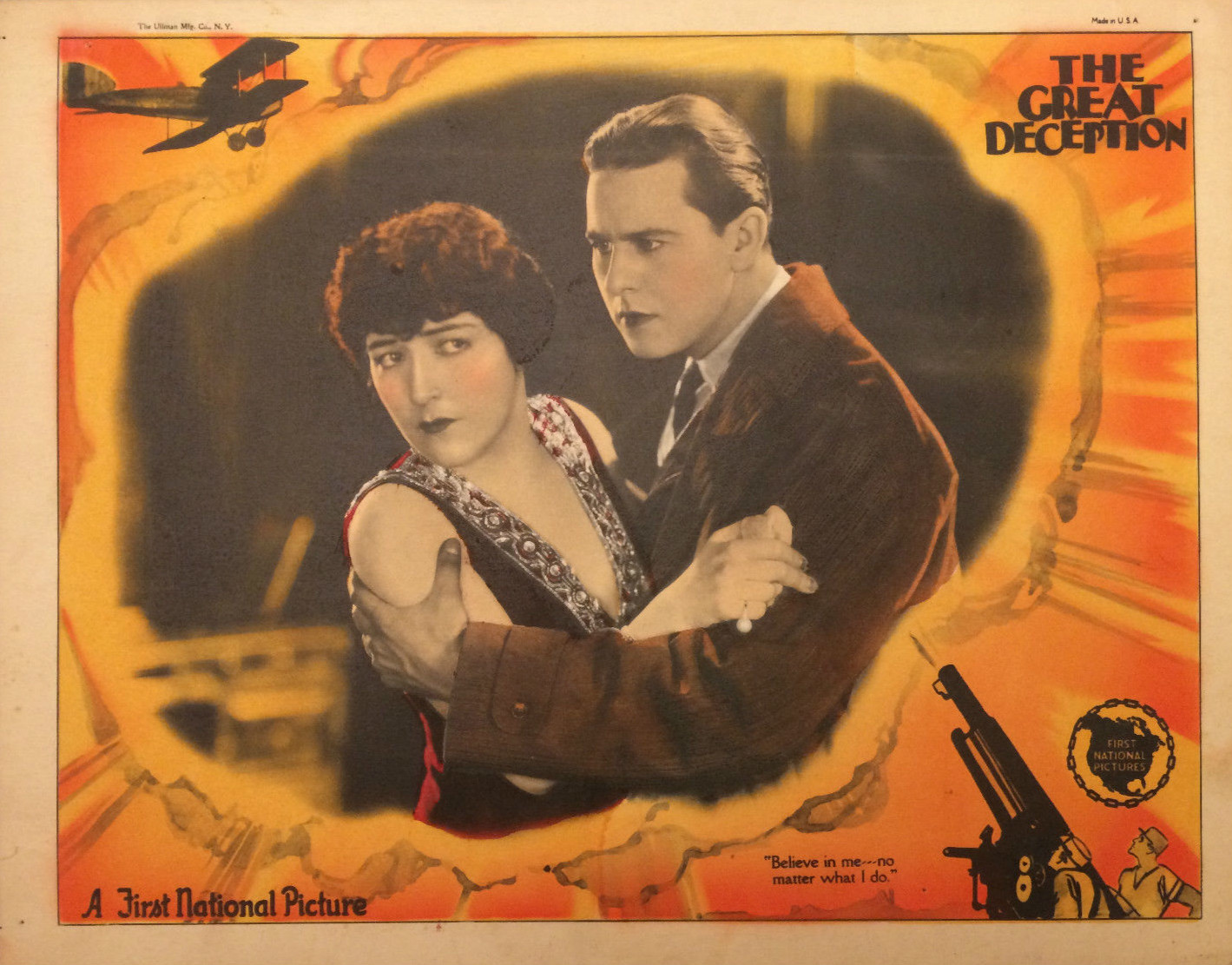
- Lobby card
- Directed by: Howard Higgin
- Written by: Paul Bern (scenario)
- Based on: The Yellow Dove by George Gibbs
- Produced by: Robert Kane
- Starring: Ben Lyon; Aileen Pringle; Basil Rathbone
- Cinematography: Ernest Haller
- Production company: Robert Kane Productions
- Distributed by: First National Pictures
- Release date: July 25, 1926
- Running time: 6 reels
- Country: United States
- Language: Silent (English intertitles)

The Great Deception is a 1926 American silent drama film starring Basil Rathbone, Ben Lyon, and Aileen Pringle. It is based on the 1915 novel The Yellow Dove by George Gibbs about World War I era espionage, previously adapted as the 1919 film Shadows of Suspicion. This film is currently a lost film. A New York Times review considered "this photoplay possesses an element of mystery and suspense".

== Synopsis ==
It portrays the activities of a British undercover agent Cryil Mansfield, who is in Germany as part of a plan to feed false intelligence to the German high command. His mission is threatened by Rizzio, a double agent who uses Mansfield's American lover Lois as part of a scheme to entrap and execute him.

== Cast ==
- Ben Lyon as Cyril Mansfield
- Aileen Pringle as Lois
- Basil Rathbone as Rizzio
- Sam Hardy as Handy
- Charlotte Walker as Mrs. Mansfield
- Amelia Summerville as Lady Jane
- Hubert Wilke as General Von Frankenhauser
- Lucien Prival as Von Markow
- Lucius J. Henderson as Burton
- Mark Gonzales as Maxwell

== Bibliography ==
- Parish, James Robert & Pitts, Michael R. The Great Spy Pictures. Scarecrow Press, 1974.
