= Shadows of Suspicion =

1919 film directed by Edwin Carewe

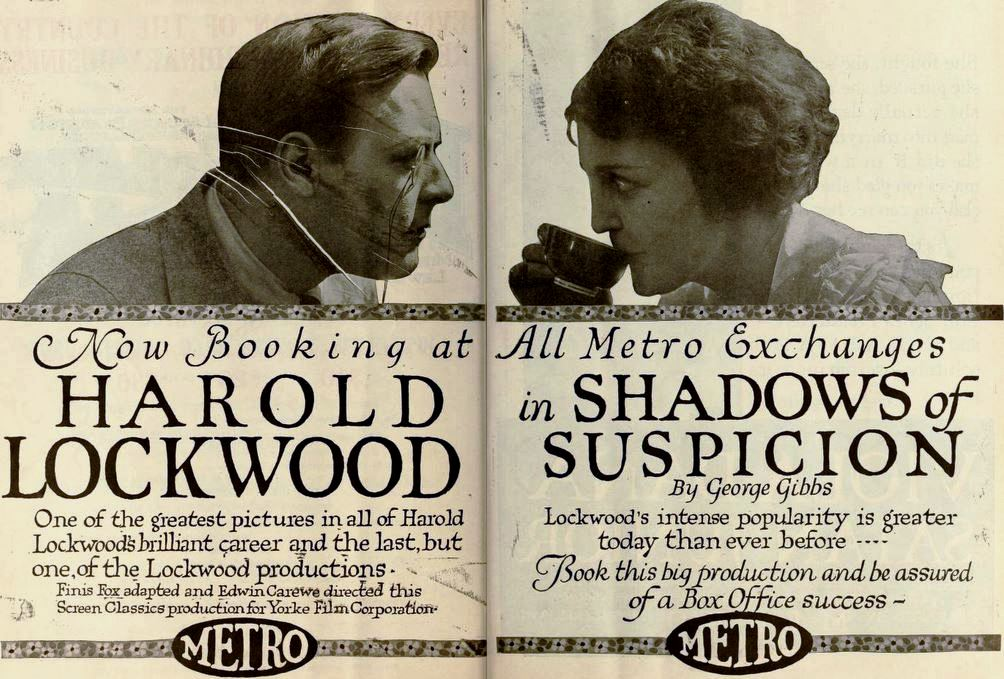
- Directed by: Edwin Carewe
- Written by: Finis Fox
- Based on: The Yellow Dove by George Fort Gibbs
- Starring: Harold Lockwood; Naomi Childers; Helen Lindroth
- Cinematography: Rudolph J. Bergquist
- Production company: Yorke Film Corporation
- Distributed by: Metro Pictures
- Release date: February 23, 1919
- Running time: 5 reels
- Country: United States
- Language: Silent (English intertitles)

Shadows of Suspicion is a lost 1919 American silent thriller film directed by Edwin Carewe and starring Harold Lockwood, Naomi Childers, and Helen Lindroth. It is based on the 1915 novel The Yellow Dove by George Fort Gibbs, which was later remade as the 1926 film The Great Deception. Lockwood died in the 1918 flu pandemic while filming was ongoing, and a body double was required to complete the film.

== Synopsis ==
After refusing to join the army on the outbreak of World War I, Cyril Hammersley is suspected of being a coward or worse a German spy. In fact he is working for the British secret service to tackle a German spy ring and thwart a plan to blow up London.

== Cast ==
- Harold Lockwood as Cyril Hammersley
- Naomi Childers as Doris Mathers
- Helen Lindroth as Lady Betty Heathcote
- Kenneth Keating as Geoffrey Mathers
- William Bailey as Captain Walter Byfield
- Bigelow Cooper as Sir John Rizzio
- Leslie T. Peacocke as Chief of Scotland Yard

== Preservation ==
With no prints of Shadows of Suspicion located in any film archives, it is considered a lost film.

== Bibliography ==
- Goble, Alan. The Complete Index to Literary Sources in Film. Walter de Gruyter, 1999.
