= The Peacock Fan =

1929 film

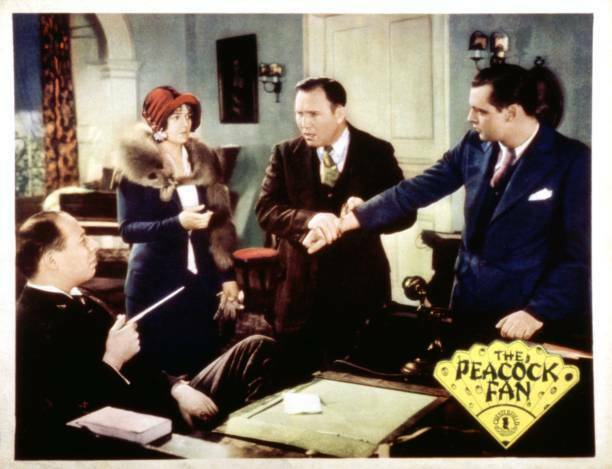
- Directed by: Phil Rosen
- Written by: Lee Authmar; Arthur Hoerl; Adeline Leitzbach
- Produced by: Lon Young
- Starring: Lucien Prival; Dorothy Dwan; Tom O'Brien
- Cinematography: M.A. Anderson
- Edited by: James Sweeney
- Production company: Chesterfield Pictures
- Distributed by: Chesterfield Pictures
- Release date: August 1, 1929
- Country: United States
- Languages: Silent; English intertitles

The Peacock Fan is a 1929 American silent mystery film directed by Phil Rosen and starring Lucien Prival, Dorothy Dwan and Tom O'Brien. A review in Variety described it as a "fairly interesting melodrama of the who-killed-Reginald-Moneybags school".

== Synopsis ==
In China a peacock fan causes a jealous husband to murder his wife. Many years later in the United States, a wealthy collector who now owns the fan is found murdered. Doctor Chang Dorfman takes over the investigation and assembles the twelve likely suspects together.

== Cast ==
- Lucien Prival as Dr. Chang Dorfman
- Dorothy Dwan as Peggy Kendall
- Tom O'Brien as Sgt. O'Brien
- Rosemary Theby as Mrs. Rossmore
- Carlton S. King as Mr. Rossmore
- Gladden James as Bertram Leslie
- David Findlay as Jerry Carlyle
- James Wilcox as Bob Kendall
- Fred Malatesta as Thomas Elton
- Alice True as Lily
- Spencer Bell as Arthur
- J.C. Fowler as Dr. Whalen
- Lotus Long as Feliti—prologue
- Fujii Kishii as Okuri—prologue
- Wing Foo as Men Ching—prologue

== Bibliography ==
- Michael R. Pitts. Poverty Row Studios, 1929-1940: An Illustrated History of 55 Independent Film Companies, with a Filmography for Each. McFarland & Company, 2005.
