= The Ball of Fortune =

1926 British film by Hugh Croise

- Directed by: Hugh Croise
- Written by: Hugh Croise
- Based on: The Ball of Fortune by Sydney Horler
- Produced by: Booth Grainge
- Starring: Billy Meredith; James Knight; Mabel Poulton
- Production company: Mercury Film Service
- Distributed by: Mercury Film Service
- Release date: 30 August 1926
- Running time: 87 minutes
- Country: United Kingdom
- Languages: Silent; English intertitles

The Ball of Fortune is a 1926 British silent sports film directed by Hugh Croise and starring Billy Meredith, James Knight and Mabel Poulton. Based on the 1925 novel of the same title by Sydney Horler, the film is set against the backdrop of professional football. Top player Billy Meredith appears as himself. It was produced by a Leeds-based independent film company and involved footage shot at the city's Elland Road Stadium. It is now considered a lost film.

== Cast ==
- Billy Meredith as himself
- James Knight as Dick Huish
- Mabel Poulton as Mary Wayne
- Geoffrey B. Partridge as James Brighurst
- Dorothy Boyd as Connie
- Mark Barker as Bent
- John Longden as Daltry
- Charles Barratt as Daniel Brighurst
- Patrick Aherne

== Bibliography ==
- Glynn, Stephen. The British Football Film. Springer, 2018.
