= Lucien Prival =

American actor

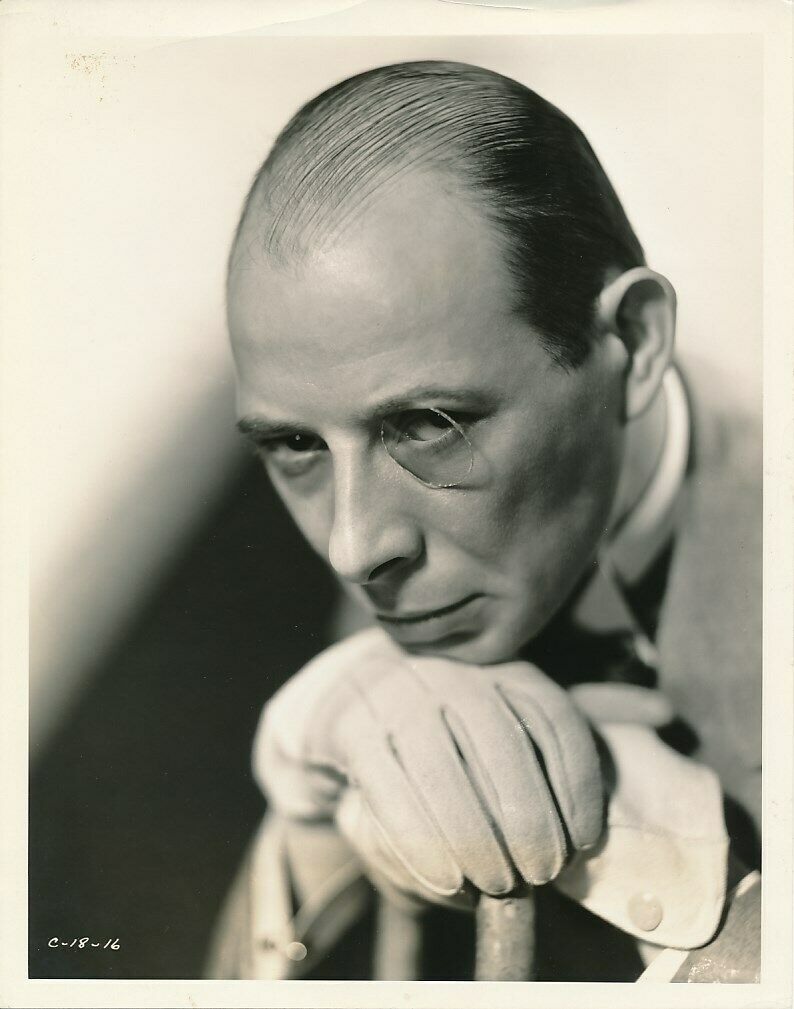
- Lucian Prival in Hollywood Speaks, 1932
- Born: July 14, 1901; New York City, United States
- Died: June 3, 1994 (aged 92); Daly City, California, United States
- Occupation: Actor
- Years active: 1926–1953

Lucien Prival (July 14, 1901 – June 3, 1994) was an American film actor. He appeared in more than 70 films between 1926 and 1953.

Born in New York City, Prival was the son of a German mother and a Russian father. From 1912-1919 he lived with his family in Berlin. After returning to New York, Lucien worked as a salesman in an art store until he was able to land a small role on the stage. He signed with First National Pictures.

== Partial filmography ==
- Puppets (1926) - Frank
- The Great Deception (1926) - Von Markow
- A Man of Quality (1926) - Spanish Joe
- High Hat (1927) - Minor Role
- The Patent Leather Kid (1927) - The German Officer
- American Beauty (1927, lost film) - Gillespie
- The Racket (1928) - Chick
- Adoration (1928) - Baron
- The Peacock Fan (1929) - Dr. Chang Dorfman
- Party Girl (1930) - Paul Newcast
- In the Next Room (1930) - French Exporter
- Hell's Angels (1930) - Baron Von Kranz
- The Last of the Lone Wolf (1930) - Varril
- Lotus Lady (1930) - Castro
- The Princess and the Plumber (1930) - Baron von Kemper
- Young Sinners (1931) - Baron von Konitz
- The World and the Flesh (1932) - Cossack (uncredited)
- Hollywood Speaks (1932) - Frederick Landau
- Western Limited (1932) - Benoit
- Sherlock Holmes (1932) - Hans Dreiaugen (uncredited)
- Secrets of the French Police (1932) - Lomzoi
- Grand Slam (1933) - Gregory (uncredited)
- Reunion in Vienna (1933) - Colline - Waiter (uncredited)
- The Sphinx (1933) - Jenks, the Butler
- Storm at Daybreak (1933) - Hungarian Soldier (uncredited)
- After Tonight (1933) - Lt. Erlich
- The Crime of Helen Stanley (1934) - Gibson
- All Men Are Enemies (1934) - Chief (uncredited)
- The Return of Chandu (1934, Serial) - Vindhyan - High Priest [Chs. 1-4]
- The Merry Widow (1934) - Adamovitch (uncredited)
- Sweepstake Annie (1935) - Temperamental Director (uncredited)
- Bride of Frankenstein (1935) - Butler
- Born to Gamble (1935) - Al Schultz
- Champagne for Breakfast (1935) - Bates
- Darkest Africa (1936, Serial) - Dagna
- The Sky Parade (1936) - Secretary (uncredited)
- History Is Made at Night (1937) - Private Detective
- Trapped by G-Men (1937) - Franzy
- High Flyers (1937) - Mr. Panzer
- Every Day's a Holiday (1937) - Danny the Dip
- Mr. Wong, Detective (1938) - Anton Mohl
- Paris Honeymoon (1939) - Mug (uncredited)
- Confessions of a Nazi Spy (1939) - Kranz (uncredited)
- Nurse Edith Cavell (1939) - Lt. Schmidt
- Espionage Agent (1939) - Decker
- Hitler – Beast of Berlin (1939) - Sachs
- The Mortal Storm (1940) - Passport Official on Train (uncredited)
- King of the Royal Mounted (1940, Serial) - Johnson [Ch. 1]
- Sky Murder (1940) - Brucker
- The Great Dictator (1940) - Storm Trooper Officer (uncredited)
- South of Panama (1941) - Raynor
- Man Hunt (1941) - Umbrella Henchman
- King of the Texas Rangers (1941, Serial) - Zeppelin Captain [Chs. 1,3,6,10,11,12]
- The Secret Code (1942, Serial) - U-499 Commander [Chs.4,15]
- Panama Hattie (1942) - Hans (uncredited)
- Assignment in Brittany (1943) - Maj. von Pless
- Hangmen Also Die! (1943) - Policeman (uncredited)
- Submarine Base (1943) - Capt. Mueller - German Submarine
- Hostages (1943) - German Officer in Officers' Club (uncredited)
- Storm Over Lisbon (1944) - Man in Tails (uncredited)
- The Falcon's Alibi (1946) - Baron
- On Our Merry Way (1948) - Jackson (uncredited)
- So This Is New York (1948) - Waiter (uncredited)
- Bodyguard (1948) - Peter the Butler (uncredited)
- High Noon (1952) - Joe - Ramirez Saloon Bartender (uncredited)
