= Murray Kinnell =

British-American actor

- Born: 24 July 1889; Sydenham, London, U.K.
- Died: 11 August 1954 (aged 65); Santa Barbara, California, U.S.
- Occupations: Actor, Trade Union officer
- Years active: 1907-1937 Actor; 1936-1952 SAG Officer
- Spouse: Henrietta Goodwin
- Children: 1

Murray Kinnell (24 July 1889 – 11 August 1954) was a British-born American actor, recognized for playing smooth, gentlemanly, although rather shady characters. He began acting on the English stage in 1907, toured in the United States from 1912 through 1914, then returned to England where he served in the British Army during World War I. After the war, he emigrated to the US. He appeared in 71 films between the pre-code era of 1930 and 1937. He later served the Screen Actors Guild in several positions for 16 years.

== Early years ==
Kinnell was born in Sydenham, London when it was still part of Kent. He was the second of three sons to John Kinnell, a Scottish-born engineer, and Rose Taylor from Surrey. He was educated first at Seaford College in Sussex, then at Mill Hill School in London.

== Early stage career ==
According to a later interview, Kinnell began his stage career in the troupe of Florence Glossop-Harris in 1907. His first known stage credits are from 1909 with the company of Allan Wilkie. By 1911 he had joined the company of Frank Cellier, the husband of Florence Glossop-Harris. Kinnell played in both Hamlet and The Merchant of Venice on English stages, and undoubtedly many other plays as well for which verification is lacking.

Kinnell next appears in 1912 with a touring company playing Pomander Walk in the US and Canada. The following year he joined the Annie Russell Old English Comedy Company, playing throughout the eastern US in She Stoops to Conquer, The Rivals, and The School for Scandal. The tour wound up its run in Philadelphia during April 1914. Kinnell used the time off to marry the tour's ingenue, Henrietta Goodwin.

Edward Sheldon's The Garden of Paradise, produced by Liebler & Company, opened in late November 1914 at the Park Theatre in Manhattan. Kinnell played two roles in this visual extravaganza based on Hans Christian Andersen's The Little Mermaid. However the production bankrupted Liebler & Company, and the receiver shut the play down on December 8, 1914, after a little more than two weeks.

Kinnell then returned to England, where he performed Shakespeare with the F. R. Benson company from late 1915 thru early April 1916.

== Military service and post-war stage ==
Kinnell had enlisted in the London Scottish during January 1916, but wasn't taken up for training until April of that year. He was a lieutenant with the 2/14th Battalion that saw action in France, Salonika, and Palestine as part of the 60th Division. He served for three years, until 1919, when he resumed his acting career upon discharge at the war's end.

Following military service, Kinnell next appeared in a production of The Merchant of Venice at the Court Theatre in London that ran from October 1919 through February 1920. Beginning in January 1920 he also did single performances in other plays for the experimental Stage Society and the revivalist Phoenix Society.

Later that year Kinnell joined the St. James Theater company in the English debut of The Jest, a three-month tour that also included his wife in the cast. However, by January 1921, Kinnell was "at liberty", according to his theatrical card in The Daily Telegraph. While his wife returned to America for a role in a Broadway production, Kinnell joined the Henry Baynton company and performed a large reperatoire of drastically pruned Shakespeare from June 1921 thru November 1922. It played well in the more provincial towns but London critics were quite severe over the cuts. Kinnell then did an original play Oliver Cromwell, written and produced by John Drinkwater and starring Henry Ainley.

== Transatlantic commuter ==
E. H. Sothern and his wife Julia Marlowe brought four English actors to the US in September 1923 for their final Shakespeare tour, one of whom was Kinnell. The tour opened with Cymbeline on October 2, 1923, at the Jolson Theatre. Unfortunately, Marlowe was both past her prime and wedded to an outdated style of acting that drew harsh criticism. It cannot have been an easy experience for Kinnell, but he persevered with the company's repertoire of Shakespeare plays (Note: Cymbeline was dropped from the tour's repertoire after Marlowe's drubbing in it.) both in New York and on tour. In March 1924 Kinnell left the still-going tour for a debut drama based on the book Simon Called Peter.

Kinnell returned to England where he next performed during July 1924 in an original work by Joshua Jordan called The Dream Kiss, described as "a farce of somnambulism". It hardly seemed worth the trip, for he was next cast during September 1924 in the Broadway production of Hassan, based on the verses of James Elroy Flecker. This spectacle dispensed with tryouts due to its massive scale (some 200 performers including 60 principals and 70 dancers), perhaps relying on the success the production had in London the previous year. Despite incidental music by Frederick Delius the show closed after just 16 performances, with only Kinnell drawing praise among the cast. February 1925 saw him in a revival of William Congreve's The Way of the World.

== Old English ==
For the first time Kinnell became the leading man of an acting troupe in March 1925, with the All-English stock company at the Orpheum in Montreal. This was under the direction of Leo G. Carroll, with Betty Murray as the female lead. His tenure with the company lasted thru May 1925. While Kinnell was in Canada, his wife Henrietta Goodwin had a small part in Old English on Broadway, a play by John Galsworthy that starred George Arliss. When it went on tour in the fall of 1925, Kinnell joined his wife in the road company, albeit as a leading actor. This was Kinnell's first role as an outright villain, a "blackmailing solicitor" who hounds the eponymous character (himself a scoundrel) played by Arliss. The part gained him his first published interview, and several years later his first film role.

The Old English tour took a four-month hiatus in late May 1926, while Arliss vacationed in England. Kinnell's time off was spent performing in The Lovers with the Phoenix Players (Note: This actors' society did tryouts of new plays at a small converted theater in Woodstock, New York. The rural area had no electricity at the time, so the troupe used kerosene footlights.) in summer 1926. Arliss returned from England in September 1926, and the Old English tour resumed playing, reaching Los Angeles in December 1926, then winding up the long tour at Philadelphia during May 1927.

== Arliss again ==
A touring production of The Constant Wife was Kinnell's next performance. It starred Ethel Barrymore and C. Aubrey Smith, with Kinnell in a supporting role. It opened in late September 1927 and finished up six weeks later.

Arliss kept Kinnell with him on his next major engagement, playing Bassiano to Arliss' Shylock in The Merchant of Venice, with Peggy Wood as Portia. The Winthrop Ames production had a week-long tryout at New Haven, Connecticut, before premiering on Broadway. Brooks Atkinson pronounced it as workmanlike but without spirit, (Note: Atkinson misspelled Kinnell's surname twice in the review.) and thought Arliss had turned Shylock into a gentleman. The production closed on Broadway after eight weeks, and immediately began touring the East Coast. The tour closed in May 1928 and Kinnell joined the Scarborough Stock Company for a six-week season starting in late June.

The first Edgar Wallace play produced in the US was The Sign of the Leopard, which had been called The Squeaker in the UK. Kinnell had a leading role in this, starting with tryouts in Brooklyn and Philadelphia, before going to Broadway in December 1928. Described as a crime play or a melodrama, it failed to impress New York critics. After it closed, Kinnell took over the male lead in the touring company for the Broadway production of Young Love that starred Dorothy Gish.

Kinnell's first-known radio performance came in July 1929 with an NBC broadcast of The Importance of Being Earnest. His next known acting credit did not occur until late February 1930, when he appeared in a tryout for Elizabeth and Essex by Harry Wagstaff Gribble. This compilation of incidents from three centuries-old plays starred Thais Lawton and Hugh Buckler in the title roles. Renamed to The Royal Virgin on Broadway, The New York Times found it competent but dull, saying: "...the best performing of the play was Murray Kinnell's crafty, serpentine portrayal of Cecil".

== Screen career ==
=== First films: 1930-31 ===
Warner Brothers (WB) had signed George Arliss to make films of his most famous stage performances; Old English would be the third movie. Both Kinnell and his wife Henrietta Goodwin reprised their stage roles for the cameras in Old English, the first film for each, though only Kinnell was credited.

Kinnell told an interviewer after completing his first film that he much preferred it to stage acting. However, he went on the stage in Los Angeles, playing the lead in The Infinite Shoeblack during November 1930 to acclaim from local reviewers. The following month, his second film, The Princess and the Plumber, opened in Los Angeles.

By February 1931 he was mentioned as cast as Metz for The Secret Six. April 1931 saw the release of both that film and The Public Enemy, in which Kinnell played the two-timing petty-larceny hood Putty Nose. The latter earned Kinnell praise from the drama critic of The Los Angeles Times: "Murray Kinnell, in his few appearances on the screen, gains a place for himself among the best character actors in Hollywood".

The following month he left Los Angeles for Honolulu for filming The Black Camel. His derelict artist turned beachcomber, shown openly living with a Hawaiian woman, was the most interesting character in that early Charlie Chan film, released in July 1931.

After playing three well-received and memorable roles in the first six months of 1931, the remaining movies Kinnel did that year provided him far less attention and enthusiasm from reviewers.

=== Prolific years: 1932-34 ===
During the next three years Kinnell would average a dozen films annually, though some had him in small uncredited parts. His first film released in 1932 was The Menace. As an actor, he was most impressed with the potential of a young unknown actress in that film. Knowing that George Arliss was looking for a leading woman in his next picture, Kinnell suggested to Arliss that Bette Davis be cast in The Man Who Played God. Davis, who at the time was getting discouraged with her career, never forgot Kinnell's help: "If it hadn't been for Murray Kinnell's belief in me, I probably would have bade goodbye to Hollywood forever".

April 1932 saw the release of Grand Hotel, an instant success with the critics. Kinnell's small feature bit didn't even merit a mention by reviewers in this ensemble effort with seven major stars. That same month The Mouthpiece was released, another film in which Kinnell had a bit part as a butler.

Kinnell did another George Arliss film called A Successful Calamity in September 1932.

A film that Kinnell made in 1933 would take years before being allowed in some theaters. Damaged Lives was a docudrama about venereal disease; Kinnell and Jason Robards played doctors that help afflicted patients.

Arliss, who had left Warners for the new 20th Century Fox studio, cast Kinnell as one of the brothers in The House of Rothschild, released in March 1934. Kinnell also did two more Charlie Chan films that year: Charlie Chan's Courage, in which he was the first victim, and Charlie Chan in London, where he played a seemingly sinister butler with an unexpected secret.

He finished 1934 with the December release of Anne of Green Gables.

=== Later films: 1935-37 ===
Kinnell's film year of 1935 began with a role as a "dasteredly plotter" in Charlie Chan in Paris. He then began filming another historical picture starring George Arliss, Cardinal Richelieu.

Hoping to repeat the success of The House of Rothschild, 20th Century Fox mounted another historical tale around an English company in Lloyd's of London, released in November 1936. Kinnell played Rev. Nelson, the father of Lord Nelson, in a film that one reviewer said "lacks the powerful punch which the first conveyed".

Kinnell's last two films were an uncredited bit in Parnell, and a major part in the Grade B mystery, Think Fast, Mr. Moto, both released in summer 1937.

== Screen Actors Guild ==
Though he wasn't a pioneering member of the Screen Actors Guild (SAG), Kinnell joined that trade union within a few years of its founding. By August 1936 he had been elected assistant treasurer. He was business chairman for the annual SAG fundraising society ball, and he handled issuing temporary credentials for journalists visiting movie lots.

SAG officials appointed him in 1939 to be the Guild's representative for arbitration hearings with the Motion Picture Producers (MPP) over contract disputes. Besides arbitration, he also worked with the producers on limiting the numbers of screen extras handled by Central Casting to favor those with most experience.

During 1943 Kinnell was again appointed as arbitrator in a dispute involving a pay hike demanded by SAG for over 5000 extras, stand-ins, stuntmen, body doubles, and singers. During April 1944 he testified in a National Labor Relations Board hearing that for screen extras there were "too many people competing for too little work and all could not hope to make a living at that type of work".

By 1949 Kinnell was the agency administrator for SAG, responsible for relations between independent screen actors outside the studio system and the talent agencies that represented them. Kinnell oversaw the negotiations for a ten-year agreement between SAG and talent management that would control the terms under which actors could be signed.

== Later years ==
Kinnell retired from SAG on February 28, 1952. He told SAG officials he was going to take his wife on a long trip abroad, but would be available to the organization on an advisory basis when he returned.

On 11 August 1954, Kinnell died at his home in Santa Barbara, California.

== Personal life ==
Kinnell's 1928 Petition for Naturalization listed his description at age 39 as 5 ft 9 1/2 in (176.5 cm) tall, weighing 145 pounds (66 kg), with gray eyes and brown hair. After completing the five-year mandatory residency, Kinnell's US citizenship was approved in 1933.

Kinnell married Henrietta Goodwin in Philadelphia on April 14, 1914. She was a stage actress, born in Tacoma, Washington, but raised in the Washington, D.C. area. They had one son, Peter Kinnell, who was born in June 1916 while they resided in the UK. He did not join his parents in America until August 1925.

According to newspaper accounts, Kinnell habitually wore a monocle in private life, and once told an interviewer "I became an actor because I didn't know any better". He was an excellent amateur fencer, and an active member of the Hollywood Cricket Club. Kinnell and his son Peter were part of the traveling Hollywood team that took on and beat a Vancouver eleven at a Cricket Jubilee in British Columbia.

He was also a chess player; in the aftermath of World War II he and other British ex-pat veterans in Hollywood would visit Birmingham Hospital regularly to play disabled US veterans.

== Stage performances ==
The table is by year of first performance. His performances from 1907, 1908, and 1910 lack documentation as yet, and other early years are incomplete.

Year	Play	Role	Venue	Notes
1909	The Sleigh Bells	Christian	Bath Theatre Royal	His first known credit, with the Allan Wilkie repertory company.
1909	The Two Orphans of Paris	Marquis de Presles	Hanley Theatre Royal	
1911	Hamlet	Laertes	Royal County Theatre (Note: This was at Kingston upon Thames in the UK.)	This was a company headed by Frank Cellier.
1911	The Merchant of Venice	Bassanio	Theatre Royal	Cellier's touring company had female leads played by his wife, Florence Glossop-Harris.
1912	Pomander Walk	Basil Pringle	Touring Company	Kinnell played a violinist at No 3 Pomander Walk.
1913	She Stoops to Conquer	George Hastings	Touring Company	This was with the Annie Russell Old English Comedy Company.
1913	The Rivals	Faulkland	Touring Company	This was still with the Annie Russell company.
1913	The School for Scandal	Joseph Surface	Touring Company	This was still with the Annie Russell company.
1914	The Garden of Paradise	Jasper/Captain of Guard	Park Theatre	The costly production had mermaids "swimming" thru the air over the stage.
1915	The Merchant of Venice	Lorenzo	Prince of Wales Theatre (Note: This was in Birmingham, England.)	This was with the F. R. Benson Shakespeare company.
1915	A Midsummer Night's Dream	Oberon	Court Theatre	Another F. R. Benson performance.
1916	MacBeth	Malcolm	King's Theatre	Also in this week-long run was Basil Rathbone as MacDuff.
1916	Henry V		Theatre Royal	
1916	Hamlet	Horatio	Touring Company	This was performed in alteration with other F. R. Benson Shakespeare plays.
1916	The Taming of the Shrew	Lucentio	Theatre Royal	
1916	As You Like It	Orlando de Boys	Theatre Royal	This was Kinnell's last performance with the F. R. Benson troupe.
1919	The Merchant of Venice		Court Theatre	This long-running production starred Maurice Moscovich and Mary Grey, with Miles Malleson, George Hayes, Edith Evans, and Cathleen Nesbitt.
1920	Joan of Memories	Richard Tirrell	Shaftesbury Theatre	Three-act experimental comedy by Willson Disher was produced by the Stage Society for a single performance.
1920	Marriage à la mode	Leonidas	Lyric Theatre	Mounted by the revivalist Phoenix Society for a two-day engagement.
1920	The Fair Maid of the West	Mr. Spencer	Lyric Theatre	Another Phoenix Society revival, and not well received.
1920	The Jest		Touring Company	The St. James Theater company production starred Henry Ainley, with Claude Rains and Kinnell's wife, Henrietta Goodwin.
1921; 1922	As You Like It	Orlando / Jacques	Touring Company	Kinnell portrayed Orlando with Henry Baynton's Shakespeare company in 1921, but when Baynton's Jacques came in for repeated criticism they switched parts the following year.
1921; 1922	The Merchant of Venice	Bassiano	Touring Company	
1921; 1922	Antony and Cleopatra	Octavius Caesar	Touring Company	
1921; 1922	Julius Caesar	Brutus	Touring Company	
1921; 1922	The Taming of the Shrew	Lucentio	Touring Company	
1921; 1922	Romeo and Juliet	Mercutio	Touring Company	
1921; 1922	Hamlet	Horatio	Touring Company	
1921; 1922	King Lear	Earl of Kent	Touring Company	
1921; 1922	The School for Scandal	Joseph Surface	Touring Company	
1923	Oliver Cromwell	Seth Tanner	Touring Company	Written and produced by John Drinkwater, it starred Henry Ainley in title role.
1923	The Faithful Shepherdess	Thenot	Shaftesbury Theatre	Another two-performances revival by the Phoenix Society, mounted while Kinnell was still touring in Oliver Cromwell.
1923	Cymbeline	Guiderius	Jolson's Theatre	This marks Kinnell's return to the US stage with the company of E. H. Sothern and Julia Marlowe.
1923	The Taming of the Shrew	Tranio	Jolson's Theatre; Touring Company	
1923	Twelfth Night	Sebastian	Jolson's Theatre; Touring Company	
1923	The Merchant of Venice	Lorenzo	Jolson's Theatre; Touring Company	
1923	Hamlet		Jolson's Theatre; Touring Company	
1923	Romeo and Juliet	Benvolio	Jolson's Theatre; Touring Company	Sothern and Marlowe, at 64 and 58 respectively, played the titlular teenage roles.
1924	Simon Called Peter		Stamford Theatre (Note: This was in Stamford, Connecticut.)	This was a tryout run.
1924	The Dream Kiss		Wimbledon Theatre	Farce in three acts by Joshua Jordan was described by reviewer as "a wearisome crudity".
1924	Hassan	Ishak	Knickerbocker Theatre	Spectacle based on James Elroy Flecker verses lasted only two weeks on Broadway.
1925	The Way of the World	Fainall	Princess Theatre	Revival started out in Greenwich Village then moved to the theater district.
1925	Ann		Orpheum Theatre (Note: This was in Montreal, Canada.)	Kinnell became leading man of the All-English stock company with this three-act comedy by Lechmere Worrall.
1925	Clothes and the Woman	Eric Thrale	Orpheum Theatre	Romantic stock comedy was later made into a 1937 British film.
1925	Spring Cleaning		Orpheum Theatre	
1925	The Dover Road	Leonard	Orpheum Theatre	
1925	The Naughty Wife		Orpheum Theatre	
1925	Old English	Charles Ventnor	Touring Company	National touring company for the Broadway production starring George Arliss ran from September 1925 thru May 1927.
1926	The Lovers		Woodstock Theatre (Note: A converted assembly hall seating 150 in Woodstock, New York.)	Carlo Goldoni comedy, staged by Ethel Griffies. With Edward Cooper, Rose Hobart, Theodore St. John, Philip Leigh, Harold Moulton, Anne Walters.
1927	The Constant Wife	Mortimer Durham	Touring Company	This production starred Ethel Barrymore and C. Aubrey Smith, with Frank Conroy, Verree Teasdale, Cora Witherspoon, Jeanette Sherwin, Alice John, and Thomas A. Braidon.
1928	The Merchant of Venice	Bassanio	Shubert Theatre; Broadhurst Theatre; Touring Company	Arliss played Shylock, with Peggy Wood as Portia, Spring Byington as Nerissa, and Leonard Willey as Antonio.
1928	Captain Applejack	Ambrose Applejohn	Beechwood Theatre (Note: This was in Scarborough, New York.)	Summer stock with the Scarborough Stock company.
1928	Smudge		Beechwood Theatre	A debut drama by Douglas Murray. Starred Charlotte Walker and Douglas Wood, with Sherling Oliver, Flora Sheffield, and Hugh Rennie.
1928	The Giftee		Beechwood Theatre	A new drama by Percival Wilde, staged and produced by Hamilton MacFadden.
1928	Frail Emma	Admiral Nelson	Cass Theatre (Note: This was in Detroit, Michigan.)	Original comedy by Genevieve Thompson Smith, starred Kinnell and Selena Royle as Emma, Lady Hamilton.
1928	The Sign of the Leopard	Sutton	Majestic Theatre; National Theatre	Mystery by Edgar Wallace, originally produced in the UK as The Squeaker.
1929	Young Love	Peter Bird	Touring Company	Kinnell replaced lead James Rennie for the Broadway production road company.
1930	Elizabeth and Essex	Lord Burleigh	Shubert Playhouse; Booth Theatre	Between tryout in Wilmington, Delaware and Broadway debut the play was renamed to The Royal Virgin.
1930	The Infinite Shoeblack	Andrew Berwick	Music Box	Los Angeles Civic Repertory production of play by Norman MacOwen starred Kinnell and Olive Meehan.

== Filmography ==
Film (by year of first release)
Year	Title	Role	Notes
1930	Old English	Charles Ventnor	Warner Brothers Vitaphone film premiered August 21, 1930 at the Warner's Theatre in Hollywood. Both Kinnell and his wife Henrietta Goodwin reprised their stage roles in this George Arliss star turn.
1930	The Princess and the Plumber	Lord Worthing	Film premiered on December 18, 1930, at Loew's Hollywood Theater.
1931	The Secret Six	Metz - the Dummy	The first of two gangster roles for Kinnell that premiered in April 1931.
1931	The Public Enemy	Putty Nose	Kinnell's second gangster role also debuted in April 1931.
1931	The Black Camel	Archie Smith	An unusual role for Kinnell as a derelict one-time gentleman; the film opened in July 1931.
1931	Honor of the Family	Captain Elek	A now-lost film, it premiered in October 1931.
1931	Reckless Living	Alf	Racetrack melodrama involving gamblers competing for a young woman.
1931	The Guilty Generation	Jerry	Racketeering melodrama; Kinnell is uncredited but listed in newspaper reviews.
1931	The Deceiver	Breckinridge	Critics panned this trite mystery on the backstage murder of a treacherous star. Kinnell played a suave detective.
1931	Under Eighteen	Peterson (Butler)	Romantic comedy about a teenager's disillusionment with her older sister's marriage.
1932	The Menace	Carr	Based on the Edgar Wallace 1927 novel The Feathered Serpent.
1932	Freaks	Freakshow Barker	Uncredited
1932	The Beast of the City	Judge	Uncredited
1932	The Man Who Played God	King's Aide	Kinnell had recommended Bette Davis to George Arliss for this film.
1932	The Expert	Smitty (the Fence)	Uncredited
1932	Are You Listening?	Carson	
1932	Grand Hotel	Schweimann	
1932	The Mouthpiece	Thompson (Day's Butler)	
1932	While Paris Sleeps	Escaping Prisoner	Uncredited
1932	The Purchase Price	Spike Forgan	Kinnell plays a nightclub owner's henchman.
1932	The Painted Woman	Collins	
1932	A Successful Calamity	Alfred Curtis, The Broker	Kinnell is George Arliss business rival.
1932	Secrets of the French Police	Bertillon	One reviewer considered this more of a horror film than a mystery or crime drama.
1932	Rasputin and the Empress	Professor Kropotkin	Uncredited
1932	The Match King	Nyberg	
1933	Today We Live	Padre	Uncredited
1933	Zoo in Budapest	Garbosh	
1933	Damaged Lives	Dr. Vincent Leonard	A controversial film about venereal disease, censors kept it out of New York City until 1937.
1933	Voltaire	Emile (Voltaire's Servant)	
1933	The Avenger	Cormack	
1933	The Solitaire Man	Inspector Harris	Uncredited
1933	I Loved a Woman	Davenport	
1933	Ann Vickers	Dr. Slenk (Copperhead Gap Warden)	
1933	From Headquarters	Horton	
1933	If I Were Free	Dr. Clairbourne	Uncredited
1933	The Women in His Life	1st Defendant	Uncredited
1933	I Am Suzanne	Luigi Malatini	
1934	The House of Rothschild	James Rothschild	Though he'd changed studios, Arliss continued to cast Kinnell whenever he could.
1934	Affairs of a Gentleman	Fletcher	"No man is a hero to his valet", as Kinnell's character in this murder mystery could testify.
1934	Murder in Trinidad	Colonel Bruce Cassell	Nigel Bruce is a detective tasked by Kinnell to uncover diamond smuggling in Trinidad.
1934	Such Women Are Dangerous	Jan Paris	
1934	Charlie Chan's Courage	Martin Thorne	Kinnell is the first victim this time out.
1934	Hat, Coat and Glove	The Judge	Courtroom drama about a middle-aged attorney defending his wife's young lover.
1934	Charlie Chan in London	Phillips	Kinnell as yet another butler, though this time with an unexpected flourish.
1934	Anne of Green Gables	Mr. Phillips	Kinnell plays a teacher in this popular sentimental story.
1934	The Silver Streak	Doctor Flynn	Uncredited
1935	Charlie Chan in Paris	Henri Latouche	Kinnell is one-half of a villainous duo that almost does in Charlie Chan and son.
1935	Cardinal Richelieu	Duke of Lorraine	
1935	Mad Love	Charles	Though supposedly uncredited, Kinnell's name and theater owner character are in newspaper reviews for this improbable horror story.
1935	The Three Musketeers	Bernajou	
1935	The Last Days of Pompeii	Simon (Judean Peasant)	
1935	Rendezvous	de Segroff	
1935	Fighting Youth	Dean James Churchill	Kinnell plays a college dean in this Red Scare gridiron tale.
1935	Kind Lady	Doctor	
1935	The Great Impersonation	Seaman	
1935	Captain Blood	Court Clerk	Uncredited
1936	The Witness Chair	Defense Attorney Conrick	
1936	One Rainy Afternoon	Theatre Manager	
1936	Mary of Scotland	Judge	
1936	The Big Game	Dean of Men	Uncredited
1936	15 Maiden Lane	Fingers	Uncredited
1936	Make Way for a Lady	Doctor Barnes	
1936	Lloyd's of London	Rev. Nelson	Kinnell plays the father of Lord Nelson in this historical picture.
1936	Four Days' Wonder	Morris	
1936	Winterset	Prof. Dean Liggett	Uncredited
1937	Outcast	Anthony 'Tony' Stevens	Kinnell plays the father of a local girl in love with the outcast physician.
1937	The Soldier and the Lady	Peasant	Uncredited
1937	The Prince and the Pauper	Hugo	Kinnell was an excellent fencer, but his vagabond character is overmatched by Bobby Mauch's Prince Edward.
1937	Captains Courageous	Minister	Uncredited
1937	Parnell	Sir Richard Webster	Uncredited
1937	Think Fast, Mr. Moto	Joseph B. Wilkie	A major part in a Grade B film was Kinnell's last film role.
