= The Curse of Doone =

1928 novel

- First US edition
- Author: Sydney Horler
- Language: English
- Genre: Thriller
- Publisher: Hodder and Stoughton
- Publication date: 1928
- Publication place: United Kingdom
- Media type: Print

The Curse of Doone is a 1928 mystery thriller novel by the British writer Sydney Horler. It also has element of horror about it. It was published in America in 1930 by The Mystery League.

== Synopsis ==
Returning to London from a job in Venice, secret service member Ian Heath rescues a woman from being kidnapped while at the theatre. He learns she is an orphan who has come back to England to stay with her uncle, an inventor who lives in an old country house on the edge of Dartmoor. The house is reportedly haunted by the "vampire of Doone Hall". It soon turns out that German spies are using the cover of the legend to steal the inventor's secrets.

== Bibliography ==
- Frost, Brian J. The Monster with a Thousand Faces: Guises of the Vampire in Myth and Literature. Popular Press, 1989.
- Panek, LeRoy. The Special Branch: The British Spy Novel, 1890-1980. Popular Press, 1981.
- Reilly, John M. Twentieth Century Crime & Mystery Writers. Springer, 2015.
