= House of Secrets (1936 film) =

1936 film by Roland D. Reed

- Directed by: Roland D. Reed
- Written by: John W. Krafft
- Based on: The House of Secrets by Sydney Horler
- Produced by: George R. Batcheller
- Starring: Leslie Fenton; Muriel Evans; Noel Madison
- Cinematography: M.A. Anderson
- Edited by: Dan Milner
- Production company: Chesterfield Pictures
- Distributed by: Chesterfield Pictures
- Release date: October 28, 1936
- Running time: 70 minutes
- Country: United States
- Language: English

House of Secrets is a 1936 American mystery thriller film directed by Roland D. Reed and starring Leslie Fenton, Muriel Evans and Noel Madison. It is based on the 1926 British novel The House of Secrets by Sydney Horler, which Chesterfield Pictures had previously made into a 1929 film The House of Secrets.

== Plot ==
Barry Wilding and Julie Kenmore meet on a ship on their way to England. Upon reaching there, Barry learns that he has inherited a house that belonged to his ancestors. To see how it looks, he goes there one night but finds that it has been occupied by an old man and his daughter, the same girl he met on the ship. The mystery deepens when he discovers that suspicious people are after the house and strange things are happening.

== Cast ==
- Leslie Fenton as Barry Wilding
- Muriel Evans as Julie Kenmore
- Noel Madison as Dan Wharton
- Sidney Blackmer as Tom Starr
- Morgan Wallace as Dr. Kenmore
- Holmes Herbert as Sir Bertram Evans
- Ian Maclaren as Commissioner Cross
- Jameson Thomas as Coventry
- Syd Saylor as Ed
- Matty Fain as Jumpy
- George Rosener as Hector Munson
- Matty Kemp as Man on Ship

== See also ==
- The House of Secrets (1929)
