= Checkmate (Horler novel) =

1930 novel by Sydney Horler

- First edition (publ. Hodder & Stoughton)
- Author: Sydney Horler
- Published: 1930

Checkmate (1930) is a novel by English writer Sydney Horler. The book describes the lifestyle of the wealthy social elite and includes elements of crime and adventure.

The novel is about a gang of four international criminals who hire a young and naïve English girl as an innocent decoy in a scheme to rid an English aristocrat of her family jewels.

== Plot summary ==
The innocent girl is 24-year-old Mary Mallory, who has spent the last seven years in isolation caring for her invalid aunt. After the latter's death, Mary, now living in London, realizes that she has to earn her own money unless she wants to live in relative poverty. She answers the ad of a Comtesse Zamoyski, who is looking for a companion with whom to travel to the Côte d'Azur, and, after an interview, she is accepted for the post. As Mary sees it, her new job combines at least two advantages: seeing the world and proving, to herself as well as her friends, that she is an independent woman. Mary's blinkered view lets her ignore all the warning signs that are pointed out to her. Jessie Stevens, her old schoolmate, even suspects that "White Slavery" could be behind that ad, but Mary does not listen and leaves London with her new employer.

Through a series of coincidences a number of people are alerted to the dangers that might be in store for Mary. Apart from Jessie Stevens, it is Dick Delabrae, a society columnist for The Sun, and his friend Robert Wingate, who happens to be the nephew of Lady Wentworth, whose pearls the gang wants to steal. They all come to Cannes, where the Comtesse Zamoyski and Mary Mallory are staying in a remote villa, in order to help the young woman and prevent the theft of the pearls.

The Comtesse turns out to be rather moody, but at first Mary has no idea that she is associating with criminals. Her first visit to the casino is a huge success: Not only does she win more than £1,500 at baccarat but she also makes the acquaintance of Lady Wentworth, who immediately takes a liking to the charming girl. Later that night, however, back at the villa, she overhears a conversation between the Comtesse, José Santes, allegedly the Comtesse's nephew, and a young Russian called Nadja, allegedly her maid, which makes it unmistakably clear to her that she is staying under the same roof with criminals.

However, escape is now no longer possible. Before she can get away from the villa, Mary Mallory is captured, drugged and hypnotized by the fourth member of the gang, a Frenchman posing as a doctor. On his way to the villa to rescue Mary, Robert Wingate, who has fallen in love with Mary, is kidnapped by Santes's men and thrown into catacombs somewhere below the streets of Cannes. Lady Wentworth is lured to the Comtesse's villa with the prospect of seeing Mary again but after her arrival she is tied to a chair and, in a drug-induced frenzy, stabbed to death by José Santes, a "dope fiend". As she is not wearing her pearls, the gang flee without any loot. When Mary Mallory wakes from her stupor some time later it is only to encounter the French police accusing her of murdering Lady Wentworth, whose body she discovers in the same room where she was lying unconscious.

But Robert Wingate can escape from the dungeon, and all misunderstandings are cleared up in the end. The members of the gang are arrested near the Italian border, and the two couples — Dick and Jessie on the one hand, Robert and Mary on the other — return to England to get married.

== Major themes ==
Checkmate idescribes how railway passengers, before boarding their train, would grab the latest novel from the bookstall at Victoria Station in order to be able to indulge in some light reading during their journey. Checkmate itself would have been such a novel: sensational, thrilling—a variation of the old "damsel in distress" motif—romantic, sexy, with characters larger than life, with many complications during the plot but a clear-cut ending where good and virtuous behavior is rewarded and evil is punished.

Young women, it seems, are placed into three categories according to their knowledge of the world: Women like Nadja, who have seen and done it all, clearly belong to the "wrong 'un" type; the same would be true of the so-called Comtesse in her younger days ("a woman with a history […] and a past"). Girls such as Jessie Stevens, on the other hand, know what is going on and enjoy life to the full but never do anything illegal or immoral, which implies that they do not indulge in pre-marital sex or recreational drugs. Finally, there are young women like Mary Mallory, who is described as "absolutely a child, so far as the world is concerned" and so gullible she will believe almost anything she is told.

In a world full of double standards of morality, men are conceded a greater amount of freedom. Robert Wingate, for example,

possessed about the usual number of faults and virtues of his type. Whilst certainly not a prig, he could not with justice have been placed in the saintly category. He enjoyed life to the full, but he had a certain code to which he adhered. Briefly, it was this: he was always prepared to be amused by a girl who was "goey", provided she was sufficiently attractive, but no girl of the stricter class had ever had cause to regret getting to know Bobby Wingate. There were certain unwritten rules in the game, and this was one of them. Unlike so many of his contemporaries, he barred married women — which is to say he respected them even when they didn't respect themselves. One day — if ever he did get married — he would be able to look into his wife's eyes without undue shame, which is as much as any man, born of woman, can hope to do. (Chapter IV)

The people who have time and money enough to travel to the Côte d'Azur are seen in rather an unfavorable light. At one point in the novel Robert Wingate explains to Mary Mallory that, "apart from the millionaires, the courtesans, the crooks, and the gamblers", the majority of visitors to Cannes are "émigrés and hivernants — people who leave England in order to escape paying taxes, and who are able to make a better show financially than they would in their own country" (Chapter XII). However, honest members of the British upper and upper middle classes such as Delabrae and Jessie Stevens also mingle with that crowd.

Progress is one of the magic words with that particular set of people, with progress in aviation being especially appealing. The members of the jet set appreciate the fact that there are scheduled flights now not only from Croydon to Le Bourget but also from Paris to Cannes. When Dick Delabrae and Jessie Stevens decide to join Mary in Cannes, they consider the various means of transport available to them:

"How do we go? Blue train?"

"Nothing so prosaic! By air — the only possible way nowadays. You're provincial, my child."

"Provincial be damned!" was the quick retort; "I have only one neck and I want to keep it intact!"

Delabrae laughed at the suggestion of any danger. (Chapter XXIII)

== Reception ==
The novel was published in parts in the Evening Express, which called it "a powerful and moving" book.

== See also ==
- The Portrait of a Lady
- The Green Hat
- The Light of Day
