= Adeline Leitzbach =

American dramatist

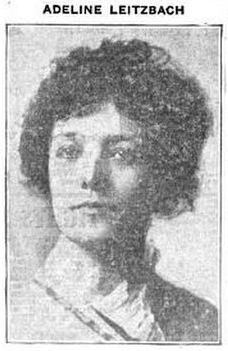
- Adeline Leitzbach, from a 1917 publication.
- Born: 1884; Buffalo, New York
- Died: 1968 (aged 83–84)
- Occupations: American playwright and screenwriter

Adeline Leitzbach (1884 – 1968), also known as Adeline Hendricks, was an American playwright and screenwriter who often worked in collaboration with other writers. She was active from the 1910s through the 1940s. She is best known for co-writing the film Notorious but Nice.

== Personal life ==
Born in Buffalo, New York, Leitzbach was the fourth child born to Maximilian Leitzbach and Fanny D'Morgel, and was the sole surviving child by the time of the 1910 census. With the death of her father in 1909, Leitzbach moved to the Bronx with her mother.

== Career ==
By the age of 22, in 1906, Adeline Leitzbach had already copyrighted one of her own plays and was listed as an author by 1910. Leitzbach had often been hired to collaborate on silent movie scripts and Broadway plays, where she wrote under the name of "Adeline Hendricks." During World War I, Leitzbach had many projects to her name, several of them making their way to the big screen. In 1922, Leitzbach met American actress and screenwriter Mae West, and eventually came to be known as a ghostwriter for West. In 1923, Adeline had worked on a woman's novel, "Wife in Name Only", and helped to adapt it to the screen. It was filmed as "Counterfeit Love" by Murray W. Garsson Productions. In the later years of her career, Adeline Leitzbach attempted to adapt her writing skills to the requirements of radio drama. The "Adeline Leitzbach Papers" span from 1924 to 1949, and primarily consisted of letters from the New York radio station WOR, concerning her script submissions and program ideas.

In 1968, Leitzbach died in New York, at the age of 84.

== Filmography ==
Short films

- Diamonds and Pearls (1917)
- Stolen Honor (1918) (Co-Writer With George M. Scarborough)
- The Heart of Romance (1918) (Co-Writer With Frances Crowley)
- Her Price (1918) (Co-Writer With George M. Scarborough)
- The Liar (1918) (Co-Writer With Katharine Kavanaugh) (Uncredited)
- Counterfeit Love (1923) (Co-Writer With Thomas F. Fallon)
- Wife in Name Only (1923)
- I Am the Man (1924)
- Walls Tells Tails (1928) (Co-Writer With Irvin S. Cobb)
- Manhattan Knights (1928)
- Two Masters (1928) (Co-Writer With Rita Weiman)
- Montmartre Rose (1929)
- The Peacock Fan (1929) (Co-Writer With Arthur Hoerl)
- One Splendid Hour (1929) (Co-Writer With Sylvia Bernstein and Jacques Jaccard)
- The House of Secrets (1929)
- Notorious but Nice (1933) (Co-Writer With Carol Webster)
