= Charlie Chan in Paris =

1935 film by Lewis Seiler

- Directed by: Lewis Seiler; Hamilton MacFadden
- Written by: Earl Derr Biggers; Philip MacDonald; Stuart Anthony
- Produced by: John Stone
- Starring: Warner Oland
- Cinematography: Ernest Palmer
- Music by: Samuel Kaylin
- Distributed by: Fox Film Corporation
- Release date: January 21, 1935
- Running time: 71 minutes
- Country: United States
- Language: English

Charlie Chan in Paris is the seventh film produced by Fox with Warner Oland as Charlie Chan. Long thought lost, it is available on DVD as part of Twentieth Century Fox Home Video's Charlie Chan Collection, Vol. 1. Hamilton MacFadden directed some early scenes before Lewis Seiler took over. It is the first entry in the series to feature actor Keye Luke, who would become a mainstay in his role as Chan's "Number One Son" Lee.

== Plot ==
Chan is on his way back from completing the London case—they always mentioned the previous case—to go on "vacation" to Paris, but this is just a way to make people think that he is innocently there. He is on a case for some London bankers and customers who say that some bonds from the Lamartine Bank in Paris are forged, so they hired Chan to solve the case. Chan is on his way to meet the new ward of the head of the Lamartine Bank, Paul. A blind man named Marcel Xavier comes up to him, and asks him for some change. After a police officer escorts Xavier away, Chan calls his assistant, Nardi, who promises to talk with him later about new information she found out. He meets with Victor Descartes, Mr. Lamartine's ward who is about to own the bank. Chan also meets Victor's friends: Max Corday, an alcoholic painter and his girlfriend, and Yvette Lamartine, the daughter of Mr. Lamartine. Victor tells Chan that Yvette is the special one: the two are engaged.

That night, Chan, Max and his girlfriend, Yvette, and Victor go to a cafe/club, where Nardi works as a dancer. After her performance, she is thrown into a room by her dance partner (part of the routine), where Marcel murders her by throwing a knife at her. Her last words to Chan instruct him to look in her apartment, where he finds a letter hidden in a cuckoo clock which explains that Albert is spending beyond his income.

As Chan leaves Nardi's house, Marcel throws a giant rock down in an attempt to kill him, which fails. He goes home and reveals his secret to Lee, his #1 son. That night, another attempt is made on Chan's life, this time with another thrown knife. However, Chan has outsmarted the culprit by throwing pillows onto his bed. The next morning, he interviews Paul Lamartine. As he is leaving, he sees Xavier making a scene, as he feels that the bank is cheating him out of his money. His escort gets him to leave, but not before he threatens everyone there. Chan instructs Lee to do some spy work around town. Chan is then accosted by his old friend, an inspector. They go and eat together.

Later, Victor drops Yvette off at her house. However, after Victor leaves, she goes to Albert's apartment to get some love letters, which she doesn't want Victor to see. Albert is seen calling a mysterious person, revealing that he is in the forging business. Unbeknownst to him, Marcel is secretly watching him through the window. Albert welcomes Yvette in. As he is about to give her the letters, he is shot by an unseen assailant. The other tenants rush up after Yvette screams. They believe her to be the murderer. She is jailed by the inspector, but Charlie points out an overlooked clue: footprints leading to Albert's room. They release Yvette.

That night, Charlie goes to the bank and asks the bank manager, Latouche, to give him Xavier's address. Afterwards, they catch Corday in the act of leaving town. Lee keeps Corday company while Charlie goes with Victor to Marcel's house. They are followed by Xavier as they make their way to the basement. Inside, they discover printing machines. Xavier comes in and shoots at Chan, but Chan is revealed to have blocked it. They capture Xavier as Lee and the police arrive. Charlie reveals that Xavier is the murderer, but he is not a real person. He has "Xavier" take off his false face. The murderer is revealed to be Latouche, as well as Corday. Chan goes into a summary of how they each became "Marcel" as so not to incriminate one another.

== Cast ==
- Warner Oland as Charlie Chan
- Mary Brian as Yvette Lamartine, Mr Lamartine's daughter, engaged to Victor Descartes
- Thomas Beck as Victor Descartes, Mr. Lamartine's ward, who is going to take over the bank
- John Miljan as Albert Dufresne
- Erik Rhodes as Max Corday, a sketch artist
- Murray Kinnell as Henri Latouche
- Keye Luke as Lee Chan, Charlie's #1 son
- Henry Kolker as Mr. Paul Lamartine, the current head of the Lamartine Bank and father of Yvette
- Dorothy Appleby as Nardi, Charlie's agent in Paris, who is killed before he can ask her questions
- John Qualen as Concierge
- Minor Watson as Renard
- Harry Cording as Gendarme Arresting Yvette (uncredited)

== Critical response ==
In his review of the film in The New York Times, critic Andre Sennwald wrote that "Once [Chan] relied on his collection of quaint Oriental proverbs and his bland smile. In his current case he carries a gun [...] may be because the proverbs are not as potent as they once were," criticized the plot because "the knaves in [the film] go around acting so furiously enigmatic that the case hardly seems worthy of Mr. Chan's talents," but noted that "Warner Oland is, of course, quite perfect as the engaging detective."
