= Notorious but Nice =

1933 film by Richard Thorpe

Notorious But Nice
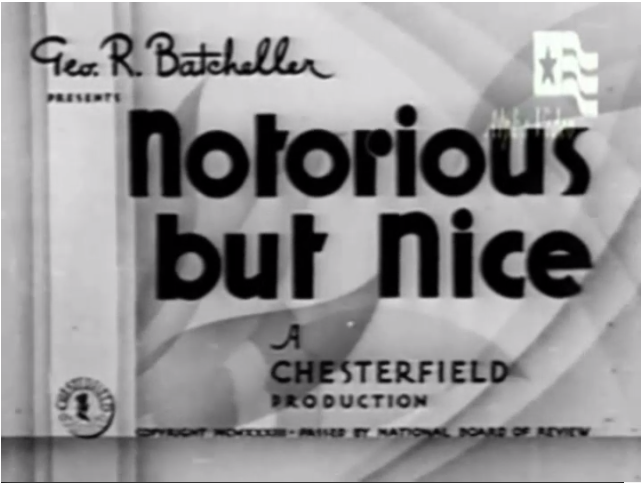
- Directed by: Richard Thorpe
- Written by: Carol Webster
- Story by: Adeline Leitzbach
- Produced by: George R. Batcheller
- Starring: Marian Marsh; Betty Compson; Don Dillaway
- Cinematography: M. A. Anderson
- Edited by: Roland D. Reed
- Production company: Chesterfield Pictures
- Distributed by: Chesterfield Pictures
- Release date: August 5, 1933
- Running time: 65 minutes
- Country: United States
- Language: English

Notorious but Nice is a 1933 pre-Code American sound film drama directed by Richard Thorpe and starring Marian Marsh, Betty Compson and Don Dillaway. It was produced and distributed by B movie studio Chesterfield Motion Pictures.

The film survives, with a copy preserved by The Library of Congress.

== Plot ==
Jenny Jones, a girl with a mysterious past is engaged to her employer son. His father attempts to destroy her life so his son will reject her. When all seems lost, help comes from an unexpected source, but complications ensue.

== Cast ==
- Marian Marsh as Jenny Jones
- Betty Compson as Millie Sprague
- Donald Dillaway as Richard Hamilton
- Rochelle Hudson as Constance Martin
- John St. Polis as John Martin
- J. Carrol Naish as Joe Charney
- Dewey Robinson as Tuffy Kraft
- Henry Kolker as Defense Attorney
- Robert Ellis as Prosecutor
- Robert Frazer as The Park Man
- Wilfred Lucas as Judge
- Michael Mark as Henchman Bill
- Jane Keckley as Mrs. Kelly - Landlady
- J. Frank Glendon as Clark's Associate (as Frank Glendon)
- Clarence Geldart
- Edward Peil Sr. as Doctor at Hospital
- Nancy Cornelius as Nurse
- Louise Beavers as Ophelia
- Bess Flowers as Miss Price - Martin's Secretary

== Bibliography ==
- Pitts, Michael R. Poverty Row Studios, 1929–1940: An Illustrated History of 55 Independent Film Companies, with a Filmography for Each. McFarland & Company, 2005.
