= The House of Secrets (novel) =

1926 novel

- First edition (US)
- Author: Sydney Horler
- Language: English
- Genre: Thriller
- Publisher: Hodder and Stoughton (UK); Grosset & Dunlap (US)
- Publication date: 1926
- Publication place: United Kingdom
- Media type: Print

The House of Secrets is a 1926 mystery thriller novel by the British writer Sydney Horler. Horler was a prolific writer known for particularly for his series featuring Tiger Standish, but he also wrote many stand-alone novels. In 1927, he adapted the novel into a stage play of the same name.

== Film Adaptations ==
In 1929, it was made into an American film of the same title starring Joseph Striker. It was adapted a second time in 1936 as House of Secrets directed by Roland D. Reed and starring Leslie Fenton and Muriel Evans. Both the original and remake were made by the Hollywood-based Poverty Row studio Chesterfield Pictures.

== Bibliography ==
- Goble, Alan. The Complete Index to Literary Sources in Film. Walter de Gruyter, 1999.
- Reilly, John M. Twentieth Century Crime & Mystery Writers. Springer, 2015.
