= The Ball of Fortune (novel) =

1925 novel

- Author: Sydney Horler
- Language: English
- Genre: Sports mystery
- Publisher: Hodder and Stoughton
- Publication date: 1925
- Publication place: United Kingdom
- Media type: Print

The Ball of Fortune is a 1925 sports mystery novel by the British writer Sydney Horler, a prolific author. As with many other of his novels during the decade it was serialised by the News of the World.

== Film adaptation ==
In 1926 it was adapted into a silent film of the same title featuring real-life football Billy Meredith as well as actors Mabel Poulton, Dorothy Boyd and John Longden. Shooting took place at Elland Road, home of Leeds United.

== Bibliography ==
- Glynn, Stephen. The British Football Film. Springer, 2018.
- Goble, Alan. The Complete Index to Literary Sources in Film. Walter de Gruyter, 1999.
