= The Broadway Peacock =

1922 silent film

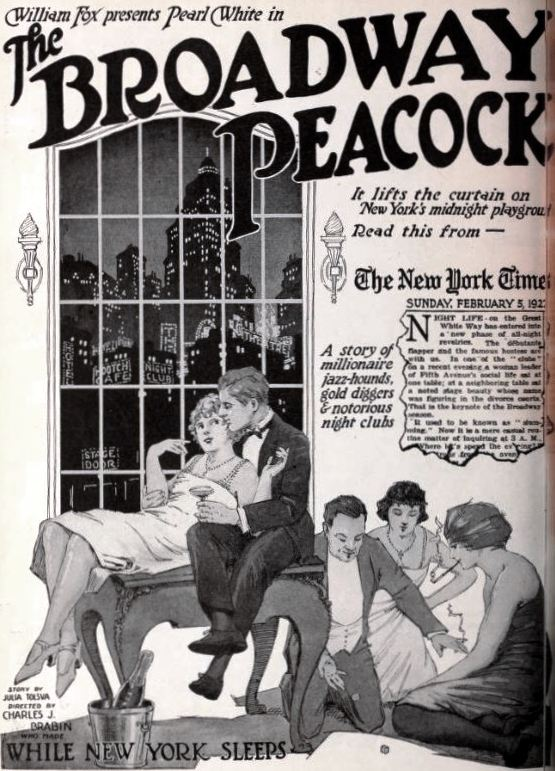
- Directed by: Charles Brabin
- Written by: Julia Tolsva
- Produced by: William Fox
- Starring: Pearl White; Joseph Striker; Doris Eatone
- Cinematography: [George W. Lane
- Production company: Fox Film
- Distributed by: Fox Film
- Release date: February 19, 1922
- Running time: 50 minutes
- Country: United States
- Languages: Silent; English intertitles

The Broadway Peacock is a lost 1922 American silent drama film directed by Charles Brabin and starring Pearl White, Joseph Striker and Doris Eaton.

== Cast ==
- Pearl White as Myrtle May
- Joseph Striker as Harold Van Tassel
- Doris Eaton as Rose Ingraham
- Harry Southard as Jerry Gibson
- Elizabeth Garrison as Mrs. Van Tassel

== Preservation ==
With no holdings located in archives, The Broadway Peacock is considered a lost film.

== Bibliography ==
- Parish, James Robert & Pitts, Michael R. . Film Directors: A Guide to their American Films. Scarecrow Press, 1974.
