= The Princess and the Plumber =

1930 film

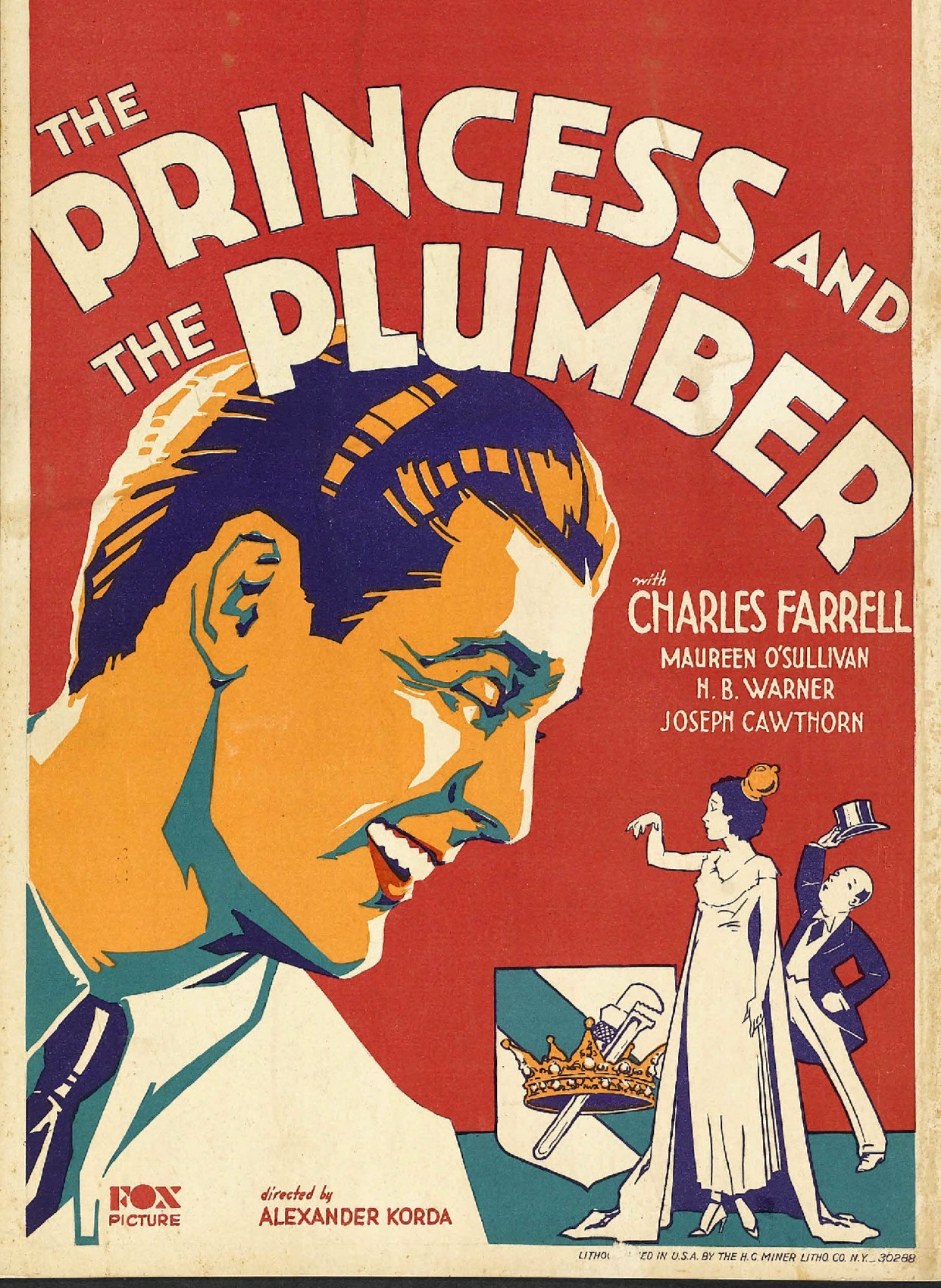
- Theatrical release poster
- Directed by: Alexander Korda
- Screenplay by: Howard J. Green
- Story by: Alice Duer Miller
- Produced by: Al Rockett
- Starring: Charles Farrell; Maureen O'Sullivan; H. B. Warner; Joseph Cawthorn; Bert Roach; Lucien Prival
- Cinematography: L. William O'Connell; Dave Ragin
- Edited by: Margaret Clancey
- Production company: Fox Film Corporation
- Distributed by: Fox Film Corporation
- Release date: December 21, 1930
- Running time: 72 minutes
- Country: United States
- Language: English

The Princess and the Plumber is a 1930 American pre-Code comedy film directed by Alexander Korda and written by Howard J. Green. The film stars Charles Farrell, Maureen O'Sullivan, H. B. Warner, Joseph Cawthorn, Bert Roach and Lucien Prival. The film was released on December 21, 1930, by Fox Film Corporation.

== Plot ==
A derogated prince hopes to restore his wealth and power by marrying off his daughter to royalty. Unfortunately, she has fallen in love with a young man who has been hired to fix the plumbing in their run-down castle.

== Cast ==
- Charles Farrell as Charlie Peters/Albert Bowers
- Maureen O'Sullivan as Princess Louise
- H. B. Warner as Prince Conrad of Daritzia
- Joseph Cawthorn as Merkl
- Bert Roach as Albert Bowers
- Lucien Prival as Baron von Kemper
- Murray Kinnell as Worthing
- Louise Closser Hale as Miss Eden
