= The House of Secrets (1929 film) =

1929 film

- Directed by: Edmund Lawrence
- Written by: Adeline Leitzbach
- Based on: The House of Secrets by Sydney Horler
- Produced by: George R. Batcheller
- Starring: Joseph Striker; Marcia Manning; Elmer Grandin
- Cinematography: Irving Browning; Lester Lang; George Peters; George Webber
- Edited by: Selma Rosenbloom
- Production company: Chesterfield Pictures
- Distributed by: Chesterfield Pictures
- Release date: May 26, 1929
- Running time: 71 minutes
- Country: United States
- Language: English

The House of Secrets is a 1929 American mystery film directed by Edmund Lawrence and starring Joseph Striker, Marcia Manning and Elmer Grandin. The screenplay was written by Adeline Leitzbach, based on the 1926 novel of the same name by Sydney Horler. The film is considered lost. It was remade in 1936.

== Plot ==
An American named Barry Wilding travels to England to check out a castle he has inherited there. After hearing of mysterious goings on at the castle, he and his detective friend Joe Blake suspect that a Chinese man named Wu Chang is behind it all.

== Cast ==
- Joseph Striker as Barry Wilding
- Marcia Manning as Margery Gordon
- Elmer Grandin as Dr. Gordon
- Herbert Warren as Detective Joe Blake
- Francis M. Verdi as Sir Herbert Harcourt
- Richard Stevenson as Bill
- Harry Southard as Warton
- Edward Roseman as Wu Chang
- Walter Ringham as Home Secretary Forbes

== Commentary ==
Critic Troy Howarth stated "(The film) is a variation on the formula of a mystery surrounding a lavish inheritance....It was apparently an unremarkable mystery thriller with incidental horror elements."

== See also ==
- List of early sound feature films (1926–1929)
- List of lost films

== Bibliography ==
- Michael R. Pitts. Poverty Row Studios, 1929-1940: An Illustrated History of 55 Independent Film Companies, with a Filmography for Each. McFarland & Company, 2005.
