= Queen of the Moulin Rouge =

1922 silent film

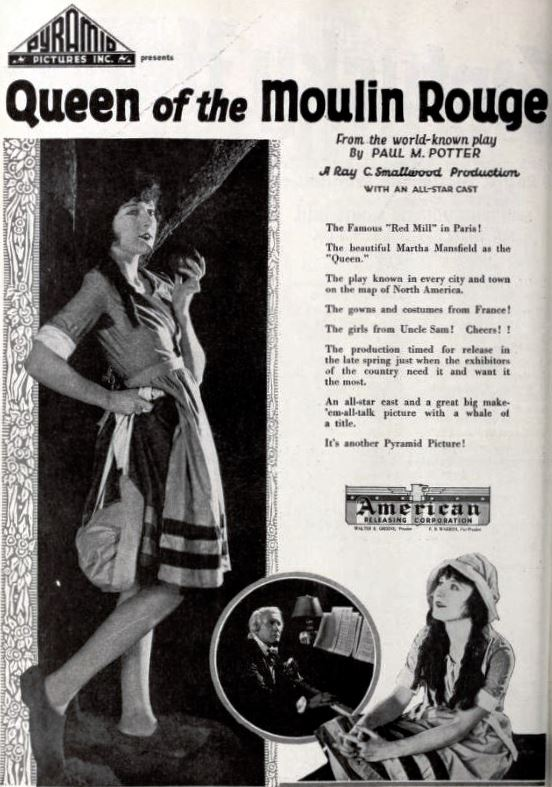
- Directed by: Ray C. Smallwood
- Written by: Peter Milne; Garfield Thompson
- Based on: The Queen of the Moulin Rouge by John T. Hall and Paul M. Potter
- Starring: Martha Mansfield; Joseph Striker; Jane Thomas
- Cinematography: Mike Joyce
- Production company: Pyramid Pictures
- Distributed by: American Releasing Corporation
- Release date: September 10, 1922
- Running time: 80 minutes
- Country: United States
- Language: Silent (English intertitles)

Queen of the Moulin Rouge is a 1922 American silent drama film directed by Ray C. Smallwood and starring Martha Mansfield, Joseph Striker, and Jane Thomas.

== Plot ==
As described in a film magazine review, Tom Richards is a budding violinist in Paris, but his teacher believes he lacks the soul to ever become really great. He thinks if he suffers he will arrive so he arranges a scheme with the young woman Tom loves. She takes a position as a cabaret dancer and he finds her there. He is torn with anguish and he seeks expression in playing his violin. He plays then as he has never played before and the teacher then reveals the plot and the two are reunited.

== Cast ==
- Martha Mansfield as Rosalie Anjou
- Joseph Striker as Tom Richards
- Harry Harmon as Louis Rousseau
- Fred T. Jones as Jules Riboux
- Jane Thomas as Gigolette
- Tom Blake as Moozay
- Mario Carillo as Albert Lenoir

== Censorship ==
Before the film could be exhibited in Kansas, the Kansas Board of Review requires extensive cuts, removing several titles, dancing scenes, and cigarette smoking.

== Bibliography ==
- Munden, Kenneth White. The American Film Institute Catalog of Motion Pictures Produced in the United States, Part 1. University of California Press, 1997.
