= The Menace (1932 film) =

1932 film

- Film Lobby Card
- Directed by: Roy William Neill
- Written by: Roy Chanslor; Dorothy Howell; Charles Logue
- Based on: The Feathered Serpent by Edgar Wallace
- Produced by: Sam Nelson
- Starring: H.B. Warner; Walter Byron; Bette Davis
- Cinematography: L. William O'Connell
- Edited by: Gene Havlick
- Distributed by: Columbia Pictures
- Release date: January 29, 1932
- Running time: 64 minutes
- Country: United States
- Language: English

The Menace is a 1932 American pre-Code American crime drama film directed by Roy William Neill. The screenplay by Roy Chanslor, Dorothy Howell, and Charles Logue is based on the 1927 novel The Feathered Serpent by Edgar Wallace.

== Plot ==
Englishman Ronald Quayle was accused of murdering his father and, based on testimony offered by his stepmother Caroline, was found guilty and imprisoned. Managing to escape, he fled to the United States and found work in an oil field, where an explosion scarred his face. After undergoing plastic surgery, he returns home under the alias Robert Crockett, determined to prove Caroline and her lover Jack Utterson really killed his father.

Having squandered her inheritance, Caroline has put the Quayle home on the market. Pretending to be a potential buyer, Ronald introduces himself to Caroline. Meanwhile, Scotland Yard Inspector Tracy has assigned Ronald's former fiancée Peggy Lowel to inventory the contents of the house in the hope she will find evidence to clear Ronald's name.

Ronald initiates a romance with Caroline and, announcing his plan to elope to New York City with her, presents her with a magnificent necklace. At a Halloween party, Ronald plants the necklace on Caroline's cohort Sam Lewis, who is killed by Jack. He conceals the body in a sarcophagus, and after Ronald finds it he reports his discovery to Inspector Tracy. During the ensuing investigation of the crime, Ronald and Jack fight near a statue of a feathered serpent, which falls on Jack. As he lies dying, he confesses to murdering Ronald's father and implicates Caroline. Ronald is exonerated, and he and Peggy make plans to marry and settle in Quayle Manor.

== Cast (in credits order) ==
- H.B. Warner as Inspector Tracy
- Walter Byron as Ronald Quayle / Robert Crockett
- Bette Davis as Peggy Lowell
- Natalie Moorhead as Caroline Quayle
- William B. Davidson as John Utterson
- Crauford Kent as Sam Lewis
- Halliwell Hobbes as Phillips
- Charles K. Gerrard as Bailiff
- Murray Kinnell as Carr

== Production ==
When Columbia Pictures purchased the film rights to Edgar Wallace's novel The Feathered Serpent, the author was working as a screenwriter at the studio, but the film adaptation's budget was so small it did not allow for Wallace to write the script at the salary he was drawing at the time. The film was shot in only eight days. Upon its completion, studio executives decided its title might mislead audiences into thinking it was an action adventure film instead of a murder mystery, so it was changed, first to The Squeaker and then The Menace.

Bette Davis, under contract to Universal Pictures, was loaned to Columbia for the small supporting role of Peggy Lowell. Also in the cast was Murray Kinnell, who recommended Davis to his close friend George Arliss when he was searching for an actress for the ingenue role in The Man Who Played God, which generally is acknowledged as the film that finally brought the actress to the attention of critics and the movie-going public.

== Critical reception ==
Andre Sennwald of The New York Times stated, "The imaginative adaptation and sorrowful dialogue are probably to blame for the shortcomings of this film, for the situation has elements of suspense . . . The cast is quite satisfactory . . . But The Menace is hardly adult entertainment."

Variety described the film as "just routine melodrama without menace or perceptible suspense" and, in appraising the performances, commented, "Bette Davis has to take a decided second to Natalie Moorhead."

The Film Daily wrote that the "improbabilities in the plot" in Edgar Wallace's material "stand out too glaringly" when adapted to film. Writing that "The foundation of the story requires a lot of credulity on the part of the audience", they concluded that the film was "filled with absurd situations, so that the fine work of an excellent cast and good direction are discounted."

Lionel Collier, for the British magazine, Picturegoer expressed concern that four different writers were responsible for different aspects of the script and that the story was "in grave danger of losing its character." He singled out two of the lead cast members for approval: "Walter Byron is fairly convincing as the hero, and Bette Davis makes a pretty and ingenuous heroine", and noted the "authentic atmosphere" achieved by the casting of three British actors in prominent roles.
