= Wife in Name Only =

1923 film

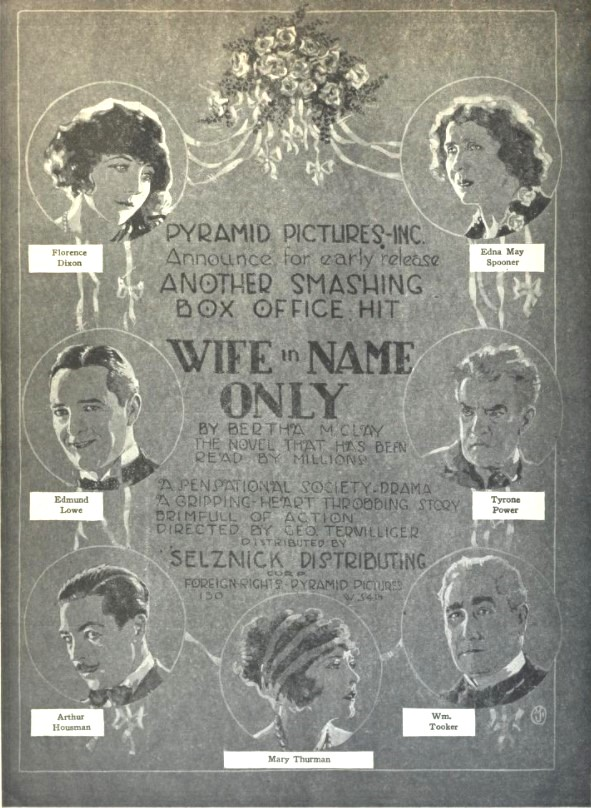
- Advertisement
- Directed by: George Terwilliger
- Written by: Adeline Hendricks
- Based on: Wife in Name Only; or, A Broken Heart by Bertha M. Clay
- Starring: Mary Thurman; Arthur Housman; Edmund Lowe
- Cinematography: A.L. Martiner
- Production company: Pyramid Pictures
- Distributed by: Selznick Distributing Corporation
- Release date: August 25, 1923
- Running time: 5 reels
- Country: United States
- Language: Silent (English intertitles)

Wife in Name Only is a 1923 American silent drama film directed by George Terwilliger and starring Mary Thurman, Arthur Housman, and Edmund Lowe.

== Plot ==
As described in a film magazine review, the wealthy and beautiful Philippa L'Estrange falls in love with Norman Arleigh. She plans revenge when she learns that he does not return her affection, and her scheme brings about a wedding between Norman and Madeline Dornham. She then informs him that the bride's father is the murderer of his mother. This causes a separation between the newly married pair. Eventually, Norman discovers that the accusation is false. Norman and his bride are reunited.

== Cast ==
- Mary Thurman as Philippa L'Estrange
- Arthur Housman as Victor Harwood
- Edmund Lowe as Norman Arleigh
- William Tucker as John Dean (aka William H. Tooker)
- Florence Dixon as Madeline Dornham
- Edna May Oliver as Mrs. Dornham (listed as Edna May Spooner on advert)
- Tyrone Power Sr. as Dornham

== Preservation ==
With no prints of Wife in Name Only located in any film archives, it is a lost film.

== Bibliography ==
- Goble, Alan. The Complete Index to Literary Sources in Film. Walter de Gruyter, 1999.
