= I Am the Man (film) =

1924 film

I Am The Man
- Directed by: Ivan Abramson
- Written by: Ivan Abramson; Adeline Hendricks
- Produced by: I.E. Chadwick
- Starring: Lionel Barrymore; Seena Owen; Gaston Glass
- Cinematography: Marcel Le Picard
- Production company: Chadwick Pictures
- Distributed by: Chadwick Pictures
- Release date: December 15, 1924
- Running time: 70 minutes
- Country: United States
- Language: Silent (English intertitles)

I Am the Man is a 1924 American silent drama film directed by Ivan Abramson and starring Lionel Barrymore, Seena Owen, and Gaston Glass.

== Plot ==
As described in a review in a film magazine, James McQuade (Barrymore), the political boss of a large city, falls in love with Julia Calvert (Owen), who is engaged to Daniel Harrington (Glass). By framing her father so that he is facing prison, James forces Julia to marry him to save her father. James’ brother Robert (Faust) falls in love with Julia and his attentions become obnoxious. Julia never becomes reconciled to her husband, and Robert finally instills into James’ mind the thought that she still loves Harrington. Through a ruse, James comes on a party which includes Robert, and Corinne (le Breton), a chorus girl, finds Robert making love to Julia and shoots him. Corinne is found with the revolver in her hand and is tried for murder. During the trial, James discovers Corinne is his own daughter, and persuades the judge to postpone the trial for one day. That night he sends for Harrington, the district attorney, and Corinne. James then takes poison and dies, leaving a confession which reads: “I am the man.” Julia finds happiness with Harrington, and Corinne marries her sweetheart, Billy.

== Cast ==
- Lionel Barrymore as James McQuade
- Seena Owen as Julia Calvert
- Gaston Glass as Daniel Harrington
- Martin Faust as Robert McQuade
- Flora le Breton as Corrine Stanton
- James Keane as George Lawson
- Joseph Striker as Billy Gray

== Preservation ==
With no prints of I Am the Man located in any film archives, it is a lost film.

== Bibliography ==
- Munden, Kenneth White. The American Film Institute Catalog of Motion Pictures Produced in the United States, Part 1. University of California Press, 1997.
