= The Cage (novel) =

1953 novel

- First edition
- Author: Sydney Horler
- Language: English
- Genre: Thriller
- Publisher: Robert Hale
- Publication date: 1953
- Publication place: United Kingdom
- Media type: Print

The Cage is a pulp-era novel by British author Sydney Horler. It was published in 1953 by Robert Hale.

== Plot ==
A young woman, Virginia Hoyle, moves from her provincial town to London after winning a local beauty contest. A reporter from her home town, Jim Norris, with whom she was friends, likewise moves to London where he obtains a job as a newspaper reporter on Fleet Street. Virginia is soon targeted by several parties involved in the 'White Slave' industry and is kidnapped. Norris follows a trail of leads and is eventually able to secure Virginia's freedom.
