= Joseph Striker =

American actor

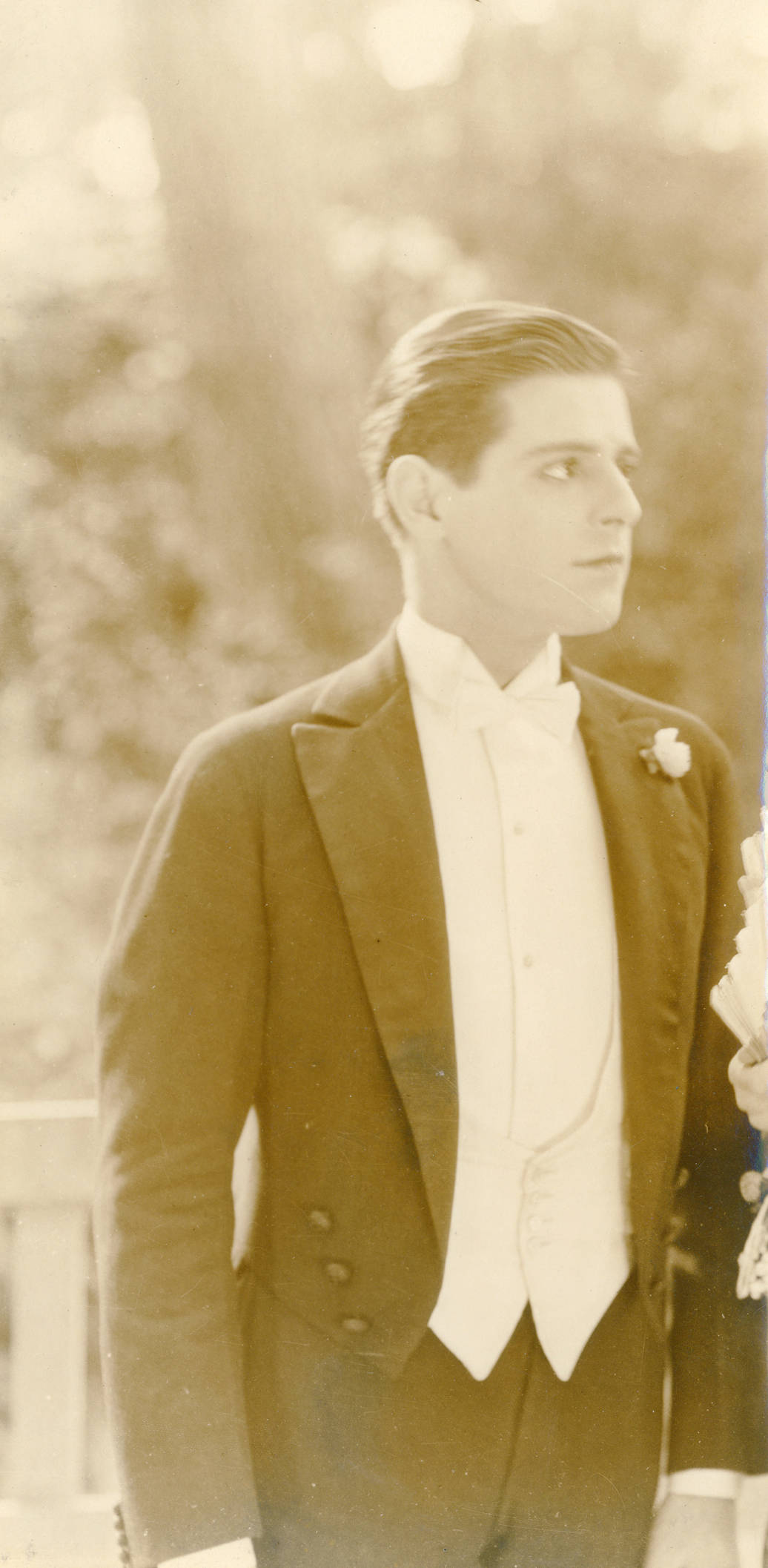
Striker in 1924

Joseph Striker (December 23, 1898 – February 24, 1974) was an American actor. He appeared in 28 films between 1920 and 1929. Later in the 1930s he appeared on Broadway.

He was born in New York City. A resident of Cranford, New Jersey, Striker died at St. Barnabas Hospital in Livingston, New Jersey on February 24, 1974.

== Partial filmography ==
- The Unseen Witness (1920) - Harry Gray
- The Bromley Case (1920) - Bruce Bromley
- The Scrap of Paper (1920) - Harry Gray
- The Wall Street Mystery (1920) - Tom Williams
- Help Yourself (1920) - Oliver Browning
- The Matrimonial Web (1921) - Harvey Blake
- The Broadway Peacock (1922) - Harold Van Tassel
- Silver Wings (1922) - Harry (play)
- Queen of the Moulin Rouge (1922) - Tom Richards
- Wildness of Youth (1922) - Andrew Kane
- What Fools Men Are (1922) - Ralph Demarest
- The Woman in Chains (1922) - Jacques Despard
- The Steadfast Heart (1923) - Angus Burke
- Painted People (1924) - Preston Dutton
- I Am the Man (1924) - Billy Gray
- Daughters Who Pay (1925) - Larry Smith
- Scandal Proof (1925) - Dick Thorbeck
- The Best People (1925) - Bertie Lenox
- The King of Kings (1927) - John - the Beloved
- The Climbers (1927) - Ensign Carlos
- Annie Laurie (1927) - Alastair
- Cradle Snatchers (1927) - Joe Valley
- A Harp in Hock (1927) - Dr. Franz Mueller
- The Wise Wife (1927) - Carter Fairfax
- Paradise (1928) - Dr. John Halliday
- The House of Secrets (1929) - Barry Wilding
- The Wrecker (1929) - Roger Doyle
