= George Fort Gibbs =

American writer and artist (1870–1942)

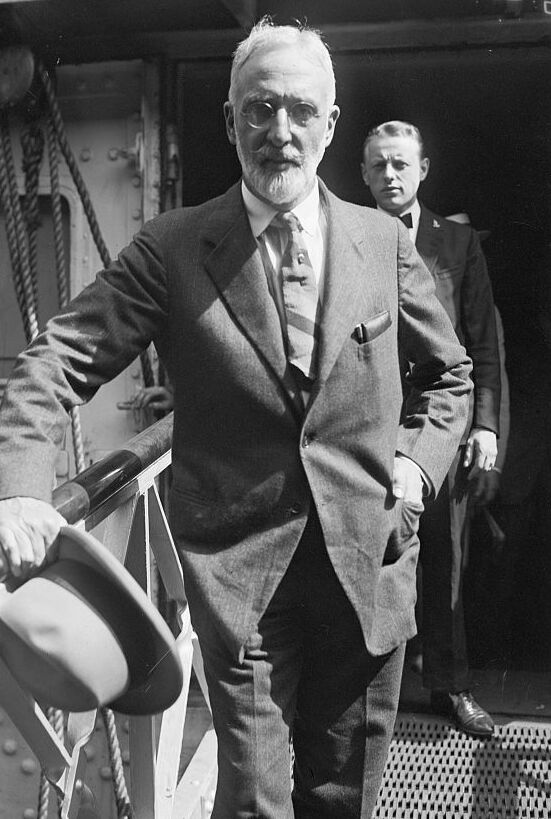
- Gibbs circa 1915
- Born: March 8, 1870; New Orleans, Louisiana, U.S.
- Died: October 10, 1942 (aged 72); Philadelphia, Pennsylvania, U.S.
- Spouse: Maud Stovell Harrison (m. 1901)
- Children: 3

George Fort Gibbs (March 8, 1870 – October 10, 1942) was an American author, illustrator, artist, and screenwriter. As an author, he wrote more than 50 popular books, primarily adventure stories revolving around espionage in "exotic" locations. Several of his books were made into films. His illustrations appeared prominently in such magazines as The Saturday Evening Post, Ladies' Home Journal, Redbook and The Delineator. He also illustrated some of his own novels, and the novels of others. As a painter he produced many portraits, and painted murals for Pennsylvania Station and Girard College in Philadelphia. His screenwriting credits include a film about the life of Voltaire.

== Biography ==
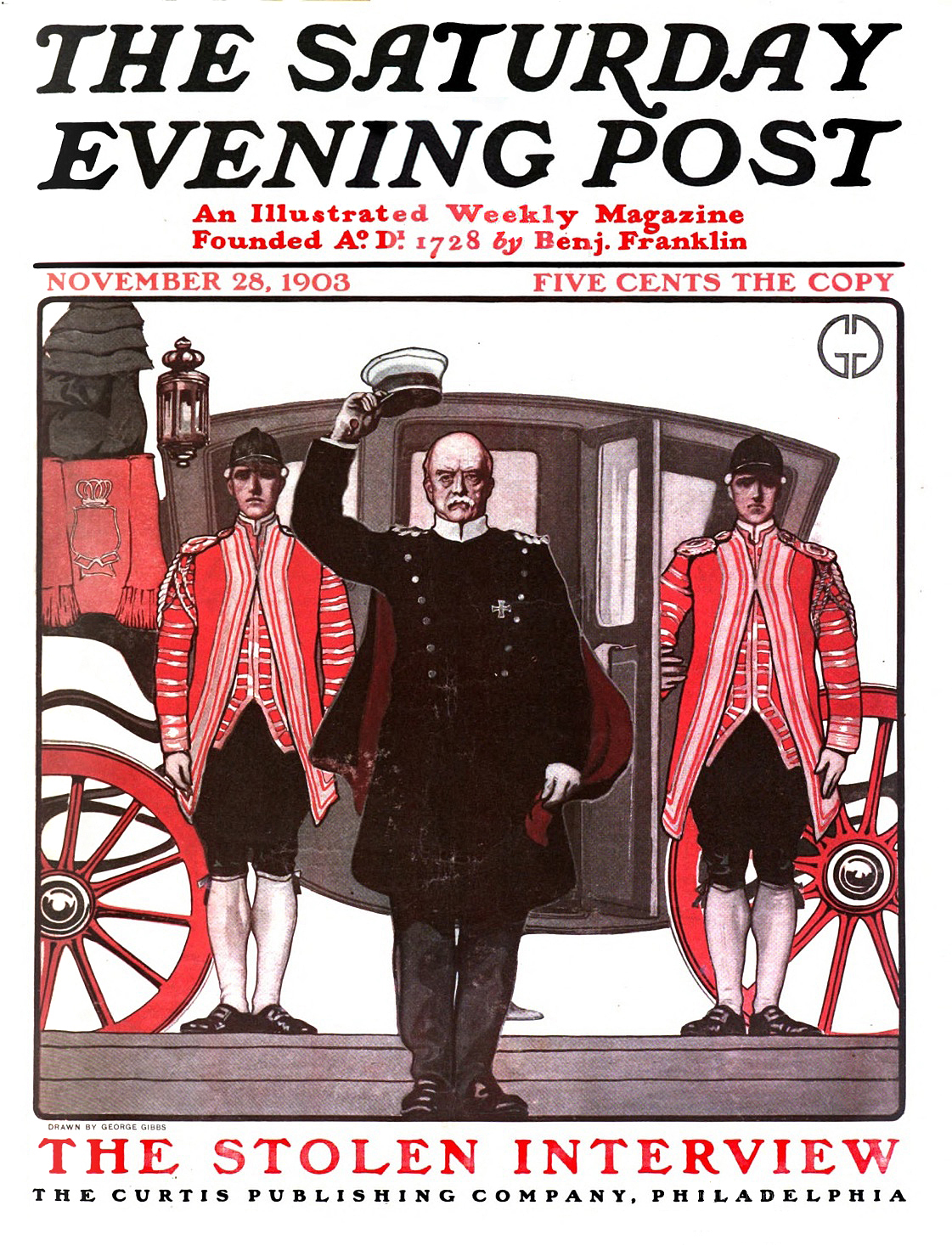
Cover illustration by George Gibbs. Note the GG logo in the upper right corner of the illustration.

=== Parents ===
George Gibbs was born in 1870 in New Orleans. His father, Benjamin F. Gibbs, was a naval surgeon with the ironclad fleet stationed there. Dr. Gibbs had seen much adventure in his naval career. He had taken part in the Paraguay Expedition aboard the USS Mystic. During the American Civil War, he had taken part in the battle of Mobile Bay aboard the steam-sloop USS Ossipee and had been aboard one of the ships that chased the CSS Webb on its dash down the Mississippi.

In mid-war, on February 25, 1864, Dr. Gibbs married Elizabeth Beatrice Kellogg. The bride's father, Major George Kellogg, was a homeopathic doctor brought to occupied New Orleans by General Nathaniel P. Banks, commander of the Army of the Gulf, and assigned to various duties as army surgeon, and as medical advisor to the family of General Banks. Nine months after their marriage, Mrs. Gibbs gave birth to a daughter, Julie Aline Gibbs. In 1870 a son, George Fort Gibbs, was born.

Dr. Gibbs continued to rise in the navy, ultimately attaining the rank of Medical Inspector and being designated Fleet Surgeon of the European Squadron on August 20, 1881. He took Elizabeth, Aline and George with him, settling them in Geneva, where George was enrolled as a student at the Chateau de Lancy for two years. Chateau de Lancy also educated such men as William Carlos Williams, Sir Harold Acton and Hamilton Fish. In September 1882, while aboard the USS Lancaster sailing for Trieste, Dr. Gibbs became seriously ill. According to one source he was probably suffering from "malarial fever". When the ship reached port, he was immediately moved to a hospital, where he died on September 9. His son George was twelve years old at the time.

Elizabeth Gibbs was extremely distraught over her husband's death. The family returned to the United States in November 1883, debarking in New York and then taking a train bound for Washington, D.C., where Elizabeth's father awaited them. George was then thirteen years old, and Aline eighteen. The children were concerned about their mother, who had expressed thoughts of suicide. As the train approached Union Station (at the site of what is now Penn Station) in Baltimore, Elizabeth left her children and entered the ladies' restroom. She was gone for a long time, and the children began to worry. When the train arrived at the station they tried the door of the restroom, but it was locked. George climbed up to a transom and looked in, only to find the room empty, and its window open.

The children notified railroad officials, who sent an engine back down the tracks to look for Elizabeth. Aline went ahead to D.C., to meet with her grandfather, and George stayed behind with the searchers. Later that day Aline received a telegram from George, telling her that their mother had been found lying on the tracks a few miles from the station. Her skull was fractured, and she was taken to a hospital, where she died soon after. She had apparently climbed six feet up to the window and leapt from the train, landing on her head.

=== Annapolis and Washington, D.C. ===
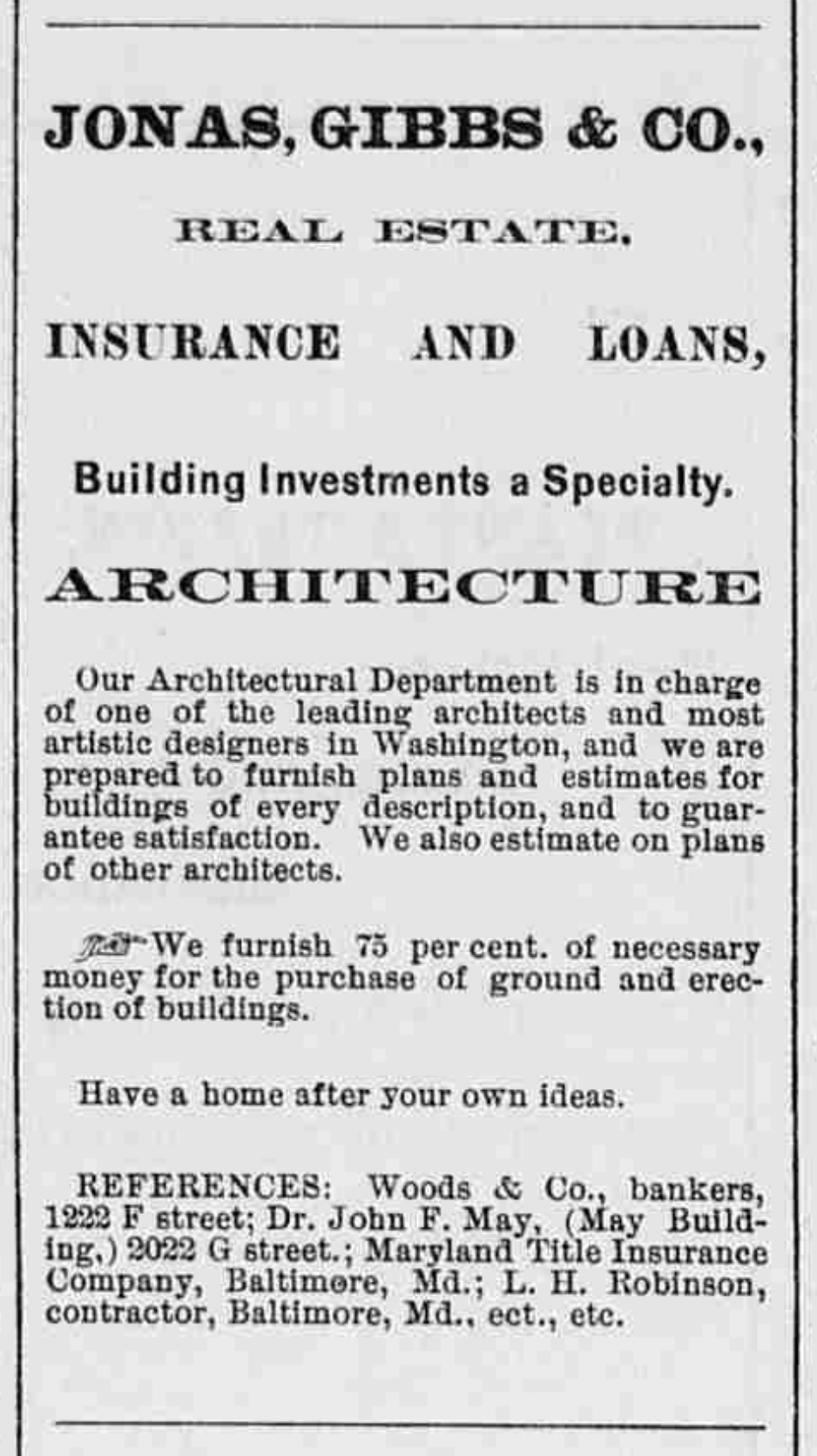
An 1891 ad for "Jonas-Gibbs & Co.", a real estate firm owned by Frank B. Jonas and George Gibbs in Washington, D.C.

Following in his father's footsteps, George Gibbs entered the U.S. Naval Academy in 1886, but he resigned in 1888. According to critic Grant Overton, Gibbs "generally neglected trigonometry in favor of a sketch book and the writing of verses." While at Annapolis, he contributed drawings, poems and songs to Junk, the Naval Academy yearbook of that era (forerunner of the Lucky Bag, which began publication in 1894 and continues to today), and he edited a collection of material from past editions of Junk after he left the academy. Gibbs also played football at the academy, "in the gridiron days of skull caps and padless knickers".

After leaving Annapolis, Gibbs returned to Washington and began taking night classes at the Corcoran School of Art and the Art Students' League. He was active in the Washington Watercolor Club and the Society of Washington Artists. By August 1897 he was Treasurer of the Society of Washington Artists, collecting contributions for a fund to open a gallery for the Society. Works by Gibbs and other Washington artists were exhibited in the new gallery at its opening in November of the same year. By 1898, Gibbs was Vice President of the Society.

To support himself during this time, he began writing articles "on science and naval themes" for the Sunday editions of the New York Sun and New York Times. (He also tried his hand at writing short stories, but with little success.)

By 1891 he was also supporting himself through another enterprise. Together with Frank B. Jonas, Gibbs formed the "Jonas-Gibbs & Co." real estate firm. Frank Jonas was the son of Louisiana Senator Benjamin F. Jonas and cousin of Charles H. Jonas Jr., who married George Gibbs' sister Aline in 1893. One of the Jonas-Gibbs newspaper ads promised "We are prepared to furnish plans and estimates for buildings of every description, and to guarantee satisfaction." The firm seems to have had an arrangement with "Woods & Co., bankers" to finance new construction. A newspaper account of a Jonas-Gibbs project reports the remodeling of a house on F street, including erecting a "new front of press brick and Ohio stone" and "a large iron vault" in the rear.

By 1896 Gibbs was having some success as a professional illustrator. His first magazine sale had been made sometime shortly after 1892. It was an illustration for the newly created Vogue, and he was paid ten dollars for it. In May 1896, the Washington Morning Times reported that "Mr. George Gibbs is engaged on illustrations for 'navy stories,' by Charles Ledyard Norton, and 'Above the Range,' by Theodora R. Jenness, published by Wilde & Co. of Boston. A series of studies about the Capitol and White House for 'Once a Week' are also on the easel."

In September, the Washington Morning Times reported that Gibbs was setting off for New York with a portfolio of naval illustrations for a publication called The Navy, Old and New, and in May 1897 the Washington Times reported that Gibbs "has just completed a series of seven spirited illustrations for the life of Commodore Bainbridge". The resulting book was Commodore Bainbridge: From the Gunroom to the Quarterdeck, by James Barnes.

=== Philadelphia ===
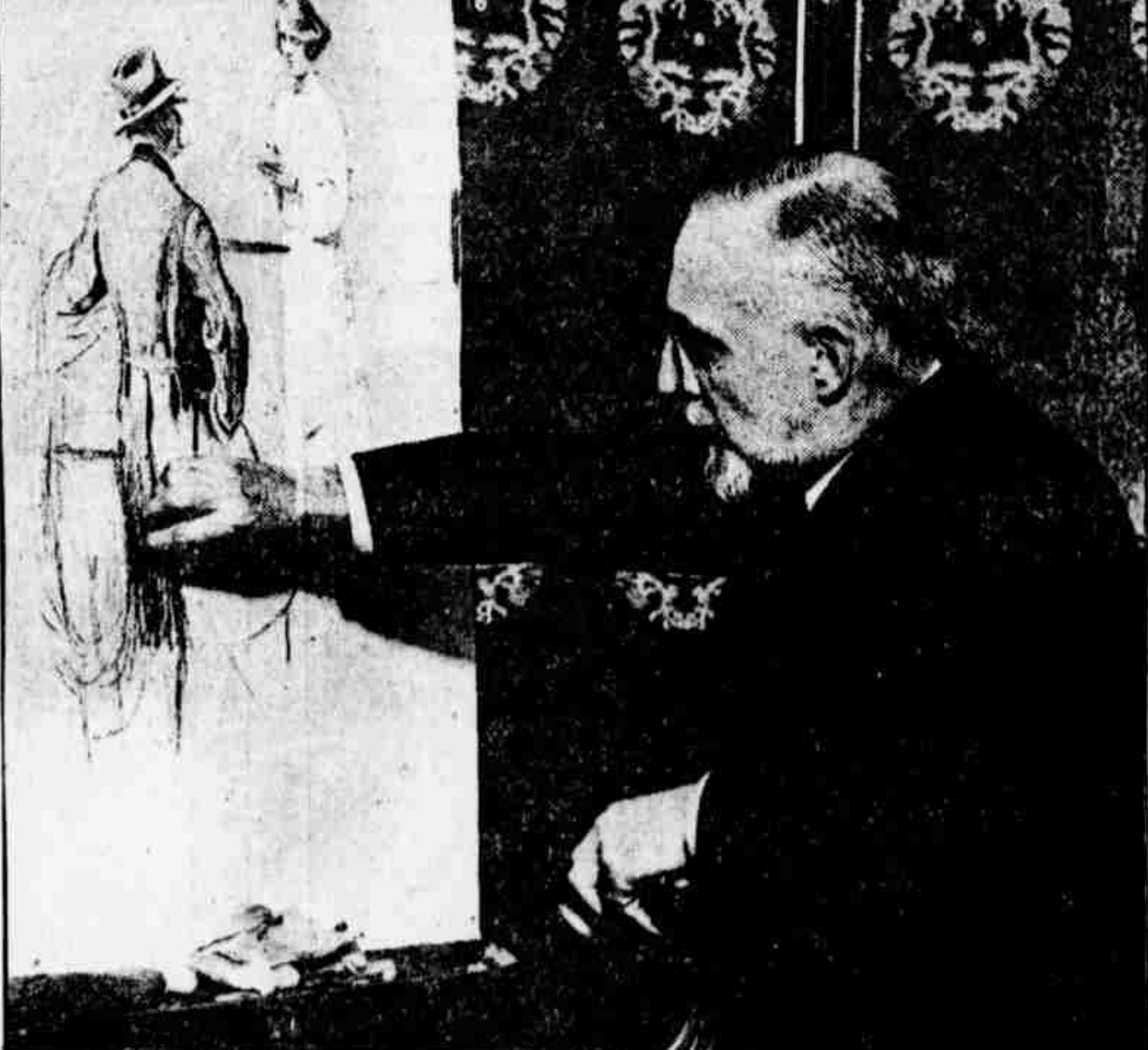
George Gibbs at work, 1919

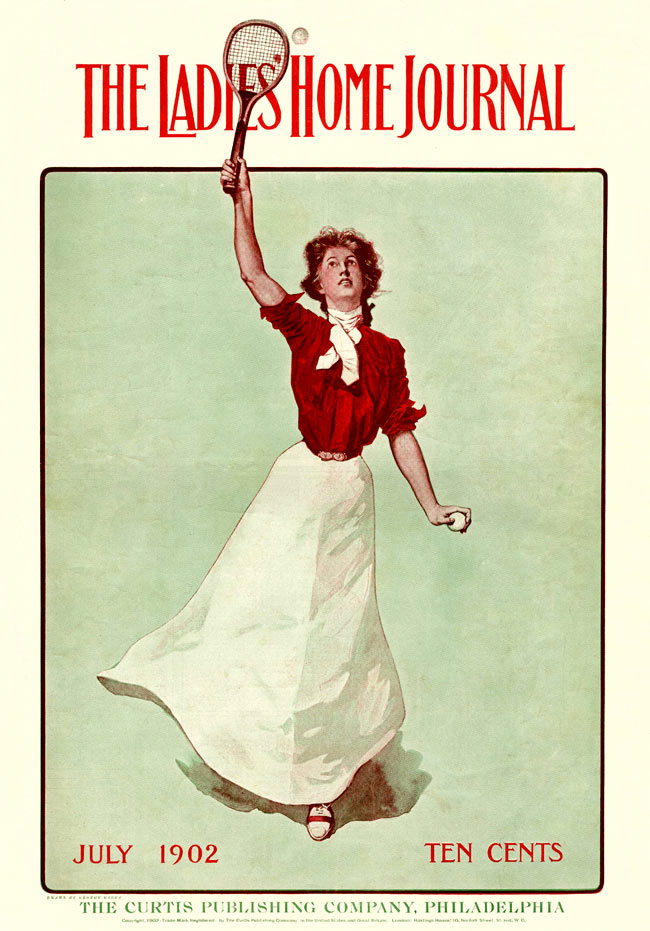
Gibbs' cover for the July, 1902, issue of Ladies' Home Journal

In 1898, Gibbs moved to Philadelphia at the invitation of Cyrus Curtis, founder of the Curtis Publishing Company. There, he created cover and interior illustrations for such Curtis publications as the Saturday Evening Post and the Ladies' Home Journal. Among his early accomplishments was the first color cover for the Saturday Evening Post, which adorned the December 30, 1899, issue of the magazine. He also wrote "art critiques and editorials, short stories, etc." for the Saturday Evening Post. For a while, Gibbs shared a studio with illustrator Guernsey Moore, the creator of the typeface (called "Post Old Style") used in the Saturday Evening Post logo. An obituary for Moore credits him, rather than Gibbs, as the creator of the first color cover for the Post. Gibbs and fellow illustrator Mills Thompson were among the first to employ the services of model Evelyn Nesbit, who would later become famous after her involvement with architect Stanford White led to his murder by Nesbit's husband.

In April 1901, Gibbs married Maud Stovell Harrison (1878–1973), a classically trained pianist and daughter of a prominent Philadelphia family. The bride's father, Theodore L. Harrison, was the son of Joseph Harrison Jr., an engineer and railroad magnate who had, in 1843, received a $3,000,000 contract from the Russian government to construct locomotives and rolling stock for the St. Petersburg and Moscow railway. Theodore Harrison had a "wedding cottage" named "The Orchard" built for the couple on the Harrison family property in Rosemont, near Philadelphia. This was to be George Gibbs' home for the remainder of his life.

After his marriage, Gibbs' career as an author blossomed. From 1901 until his death in 1942, he reliably turned out novels at a rate of about one per year. By 1916 newspapers were speaking of Mr. Gibbs' "annual novel". Many of these novels were serialized in newspapers and magazines before being published in book form. His books were primarily adventure novels, in the vein of John Buchan or E. Philips Oppenheim, often involving international intrigue. For example, his novel The Black Stone (1919) is reminiscent of John Buchan's Greenmantle (1916). Both novels involve a sacred stone, and deal with an effort to thwart a German plot to provoke an Arab insurrection.

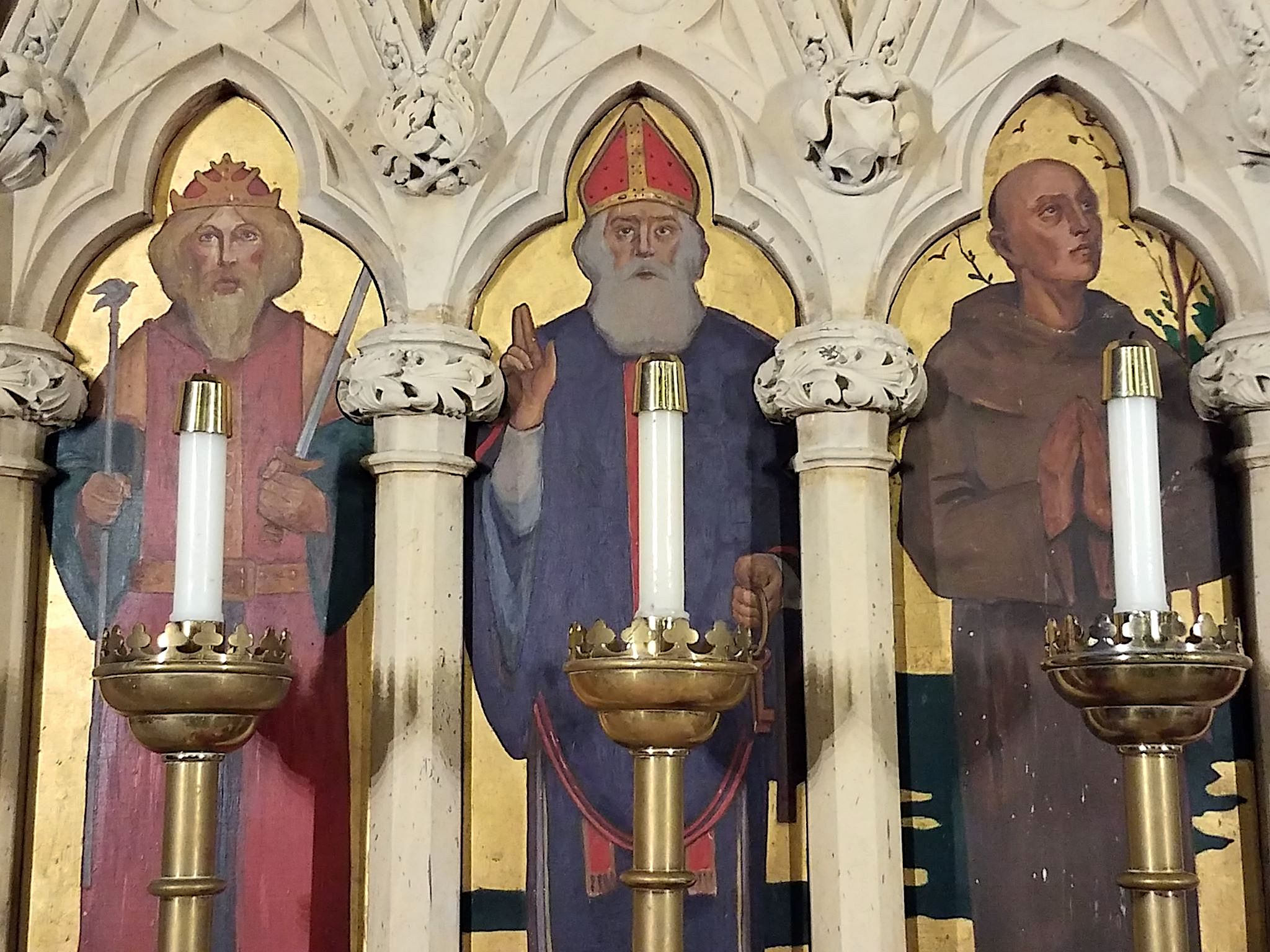
Detail of reredos by Gibbs, L to R, King Saint Edward the Confessor, Saint Peter the Apostle, Saint Francis of Assisi, Church of the Good Shepherd, Rosemont, Pennsylvania.

Gibbs continued to illustrate his own and other authors' books, and to create illustrations for many magazines and newspapers. He also pursued a growing career as a painter.

In time, Gibbs became a pillar of the community and a well-known member of Philadelphia society. When G.K. Chesterton visited Philadelphia in 1921, he stayed at the Gibbs' home. The 1936–37 edition of Who's Who in America notes that Gibbs was a member of the Art Club of Philadelphia, The Franklin Inn Club, the Pegasus Club, the Merion Cricket Club and the Rittenhouse Club. During Chesterton's visit, Gibbs took him to lunch at the Franklin Inn club. In 1909, Gibbs discovered a fire in the clubhouse of the Merion Cricket Club, and helped organize a bucket brigade to put it out. Gibbs participated in amateur theatrical productions, in one instance dressing in feathers to play Chanticleer: "We made it a sort of satire on modern letters, with Chantecler chasing Rostand and Ibsen haunted by his characters, and so on. It was very good fun." Gibbs served on juries for many art exhibitions alongside fellow artists including Frederic Remington and A. B. Frost. The 1925 Haverford College yearbook notes that Gibbs, "the well-known painter and writer of best-sellers", had addressed that school's English Club on the subject of "Writing Novels".

Gibbs was for many years a vestryman of the Episcopal Church of the Good Shepherd in Rosemont. In 1929 he created seven paintings for the church's High Altar reredos as a memorial to his parents. The center panel was a Virgin and Child, flanked by panels depicting other biblical figures from the Old and New Testaments.

By 1915 film makers had begun adapting Gibbs' novels for the screen. The first film based on a Gibbs novel was The Flaming Sword, produced by Rolfe Photoplays, a company that had been founded the previous year by B. A. Rolfe. This was the company's ninth feature film. It starred a young Lionel Barrymore. Between 1915 and 1926 ten films were based on Gibbs novels. In later years, Gibbs collaborated with lawyer E. Lawrence Dudley to write a "novel" about Voltaire at the request of George Arliss, intended to be the basis for a film. After several false starts, the film was finally produced in 1933. His work was also part of the painting event in the art competition at the 1932 Summer Olympics.

George Gibbs died on October 10, 1942, after a long illness. He was buried on October 14 in Laurel Hill Cemetery in Philadelphia.

=== Children ===
George Gibbs' 1930 portrait of his daughter, Sally Gibbs

George Fort Gibbs Jr. (1902–1988) was a member of the Princeton University class of 1923. While there, he participated in college musical groups, serving as leader of the "Banjo Club", for example. The 1930 census lists him as a "play writer" living with his parents in Rosemont, and the Library of Congress Catalog of Copyright Entries lists a 1933 play called "This New Deal" authored by George F. Gibbs Jr., and M. Mark Sulkes. George Gibbs Jr. ultimately moved to Venice, Florida, where he became a real estate developer. He continued to be known as an amateur musician, and was one of the founders of what is now called the Sarasota Orchestra.

Theodore Harrison Gibbs (1908–1944) was a well-regarded sculptor. In 1938 he won the prestigious Prix de Rome fellowship and travelled to Rome to work at the American Academy. There, he met and married his wife, sculptor Maurine Montgomery. After the couple moved back to the United States, Harrison enlisted in the military and served in France during World War II. When he left the United States, Maurine was pregnant with their daughter Romona. Harrison was killed in 1944 during the Battle of the Bulge. Maurine and Romona were frequent visitors at "The Orchard". A large stone barn on the property was used as a sculpture studio by Harrison and Maurine. In 2011 the property was finally sold out of the family and many works of art by Harrison, Maurine and other family members were dispersed to museums and other new locations.

Sarah (Sally) Stovell Gibbs McClure (1912–2006) was a dancer, singer, songwriter and author of poems, novels and plays. At the age of nineteen she produced a book of poems called Beauty for Ashes. In 1928, when she was sixteen, she danced in the Philadelphia Grand Opera Company's production of Carmen. By 1934 she was singing and acting on Broadway in Life Begins at 8:40, a musical revue by Harold Arlen, Ira Gershwin and Yip Harburg. She married Navy test pilot Howard McClure in 1941. McClure died in 1960, at which point Sally moved back to "The Orchard" to care for her mother (who lived until 1973), and remained there until her own death in 2006. While at "The Orchard" she taught flamenco and hula dancing. She was the last of her family to occupy the property. Toward the end of her life she wrote and self-published a fictionalized memoir titled Main Line Maverick.

== Books ==
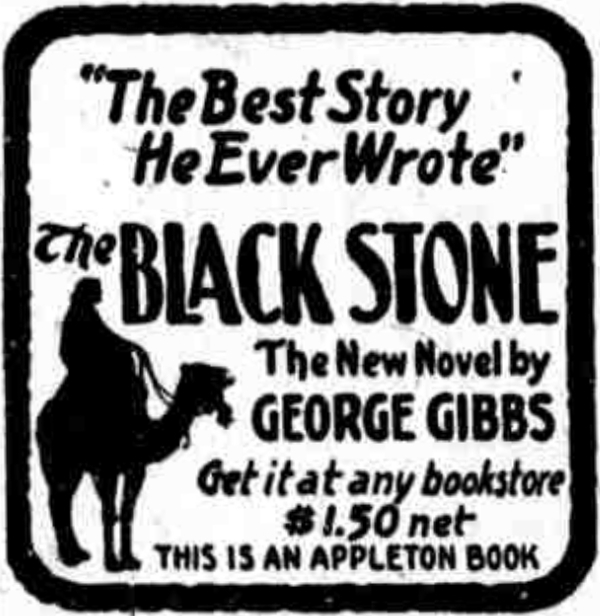
Newspaper ad for Gibbs' 1919 novel The Black Stone

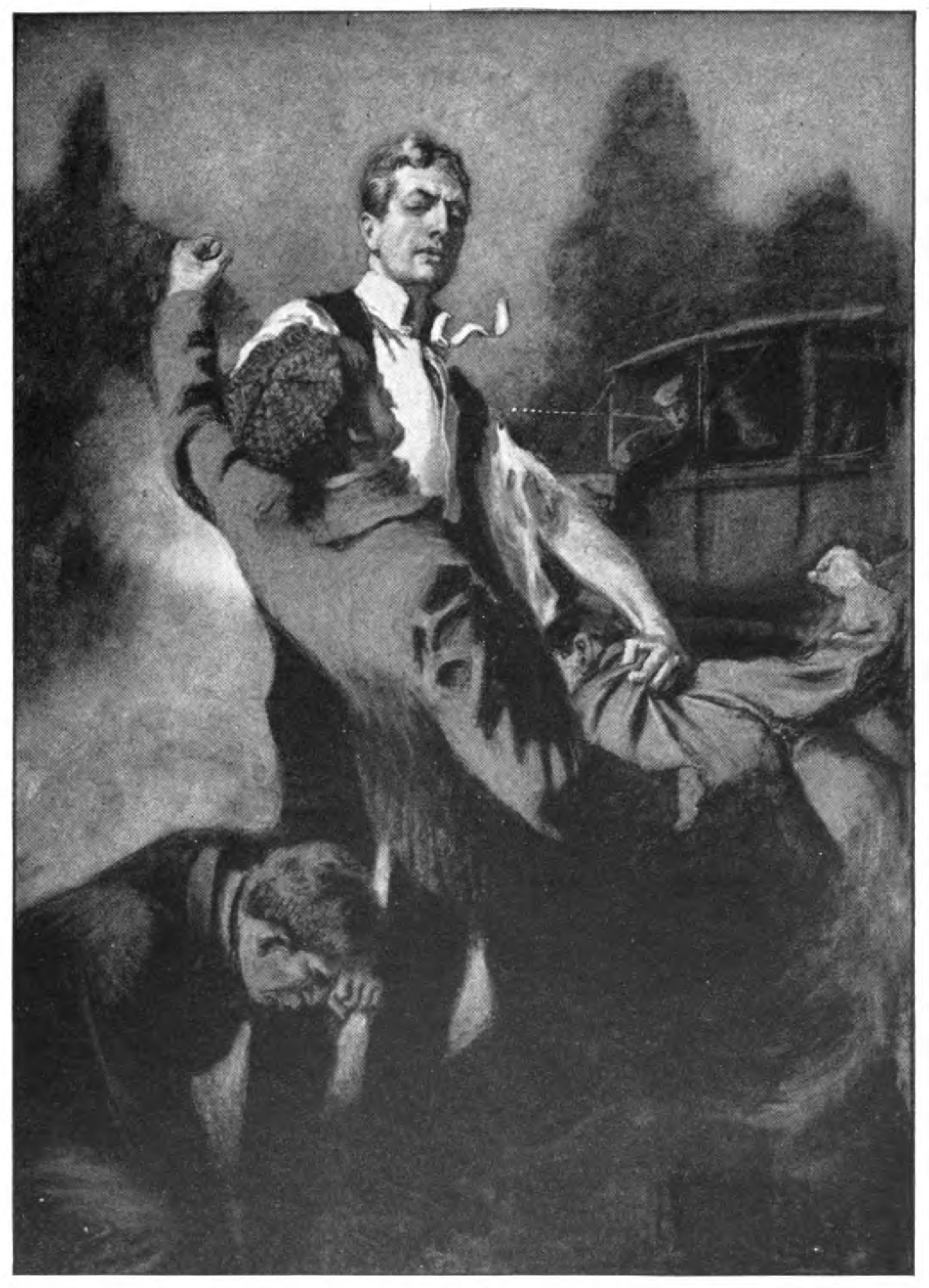
Frontispiece by George Gibbs for his 1915 novel The Yellow Dove

The Library of Congress Online Catalog gives "Gibbs, George, 1870–1942" as the author of the following books:

Title	Publisher	Year
Junk: a collection of songs and poems by cadets at the United States naval academy	Washington, D.C., The Patentee publishing company	1889
Pike & Cutlass; Hero Tales of Our Navy (archive.org)	Philadelphia, London, J.B. Lippincott company	1900
In Search of Mademoiselle (archive.org)	Philadelphia, H. T. Coates & Co.	1901
American Sea Fights; Twelve Paintings	New York, R. H. Russell	1902
The Love of Monsieur (archive.org)	New York, London, Harper & Brothers	1903
The Medusa Emerald	New York : D. Appleton and Company	1907
Tony's Wife	New York; London : D. Appleton and Company	1910
The Bolted Door (archive.org)	New York and London, D. Appleton and company	1911
The Forbidden Way (archive.org)	New York and London : D. Appleton and company	1911
The Maker of Opportunities (archive.org)	New York, D. Appleton	1912
Madcap (archive.org)	New York; London : D. Appleton and Company	1913
The Silent Battle (archive.org)	New York; London : D. Appleton and Company	1913
The Flaming Sword (archive.org)	New York and London, D. Appleton and company	1914
The Yellow Dove (archive.org)	New York and London, D. Appleton and company	1915
Paradise Garden; the Satirical Narrative of a Great Experiment (archive.org)	New York [etc.] D. Appleton and Company	1916
The Secret Witness (archive.org)	New York, London, D. Appleton and Company	1917
The Golden Bough	London, Appleton	1918
The Black Stone (Google books)	New York; London : D. Appleton and co.	1919
The Splendid Outcast (archive.org)	New York, London, D. Appleton and company	1920
Youth Triumphant (Google books)	New York : D. Appleton	c.1921
The Vagrant Duke (archive.org)	New York, London, D. Appleton and company	1921
The House of Mohun (archive.org)	New York, London, D. Appleton and Company	1922
Fires of Ambition	New York, London, D. Appleton and company	1923
Sackcloth and Scarlet	New York, D. Appleton and Company	1924
How to Stay Married	New York, London, D. Appleton and company	1925
Mad Marriage	New York, London, D. Appleton and company	1925
The Flame of Courage	New York, London, D. Appleton and Company	1926
The Love of Mademoiselle	New York, London, D. Appleton and Company	1926
The Up-grade	New York, London, D. Appleton and Company	1927
The Castle Rock Mystery	New York, London, D. Appleton and Company	1927
The Joyous Conspirator	New York, J. H. Sears & Company, inc.	c.1927
The Shores of Romance	New York, London, D. Appleton and Company	1928
The Passionate Prelude	New York, J. H. Sears & company, inc.	c.1929
Isle of Illusion	New York, J. H. Sears & company, inc.	c.1929
The Fire Within	New York, London, D. Appleton and company	1930
Old Philadelphia	New York, London, D. Appleton and Company	1931
Foul Weather	New York, London, D. Appleton and company	1933
Honor Among Women	New York, London : D. Appleton-Century, incorporated	1933
Out of the Dark	New York; London : D. Appleton-Century Company, Incorporated	1934
The Yellow Diamond	New York, London, D. Appleton-Century company, incorporated	1935
The Vanishing Idol	New York, London, D. Appleton-Century Company, incorporated	1936
Anything Can Happen	New York; London : D. Appleton-Century	1936
Hunted	New York; London : Appleton-Century Company Incorporated	1937
The Road to Bagdad	New York; London : D. Appleton-Century Company Incorporated	1938
The Silver Death	New York; London : D. Appleton-Century Company, Incorporated	1939
The Triangle Man	New York, London, D. Appleton-Century company, incorporated	1939
The Sleeper Wakes	New York : Appleton-Century	1941

== Films ==
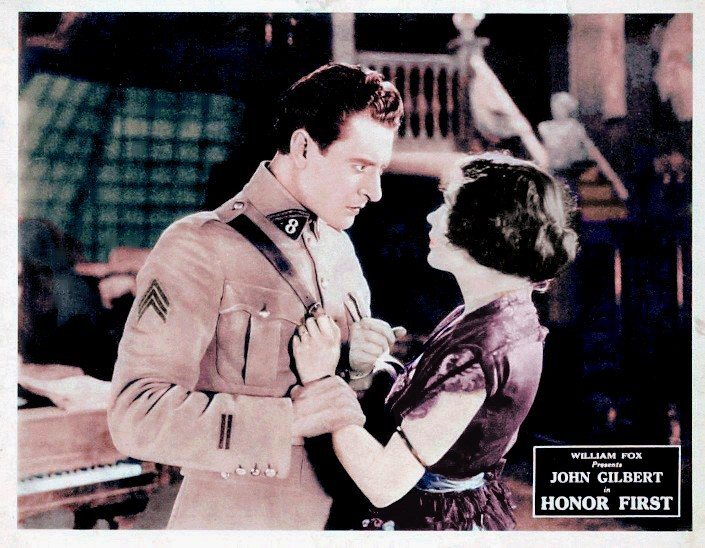
Lobby card for the film Honor First, based on the novel The Splendid Outcast by George Gibbs

The New York Times obituary for Gibbs says that he "Wrote dialog for more than a dozen motion pictures", but the American Film Institute (AFI) Catalog of Feature Films and the Internet Movie Database (IMDb) only include the eleven films shown in the table below.

Film	Year	Gibbs' Role(s)	Notes
The Flaming Sword	1915	author	Based on Gibbs' novel of the same name. The film starred the young Lionel Barrymore.
The Madcap	1916	author and screenwriter	Although the AFI Catalog doesn't acknowledge this, the Progressive Silent Film List (PSFL) notes that the film is based on Gibbs' 1913 novel of the same name.
The Silent Battle	1916	author	Based on Gibbs' novel of the same name. Not listed in the AFI Catalog, but appears in the Internet Movie Database.
Paradise Garden	1917	author	Based on Gibbs' novel of the same name
Shadows of Suspicion	1919	author	Based on Gibbs' novel The Yellow Dove. This was the last movie in which Harold Lockwood starred. He died of influenza during the 1918 Spanish flu pandemic before the film was finished, and a double was used to complete the film. His leading lady was Virginia Rappe who later figured tragically as the victim in the Fatty Arbuckle rape and manslaughter case.
Honor First	1922	author	Based on Gibbs' novel The Splendid Outcast
The Bolted Door	1923	author and screenwriter	Based on Gibbs' novel of the same name
Enemies of Children	1923	author	Based on Gibbs' novel Youth Triumphant
Sackcloth and Scarlet	1925	author	Based on Gibbs' novel of the same name
The Great Deception	1926	author	Based on Gibbs' novel The Yellow Dove. The second film based on this novel, it features Basil Rathbone as a villainous German agent.
Voltaire	1933	author	Based on a novel by George Gibbs and E. Lawrence Dudley. Dudley took on the task of writing the novel at the instigation of George Arliss, who had an ambition to play the role of Voltaire in a film, and sought a novel as the basis for a screenplay. He had tried to convince other authors (such as George Bernard Shaw) to write it, but without success. Around 1919, Dudley, an acquaintance of Arliss, took on the task and recruited his friend and fellow member of the Franklin Inn Club, George Gibbs, to help him write it. The movie was planned and canceled several times before it was ultimately produced in 1933.
