= Sydney Horler =

British writer (1888–1954)

The Cage by Sydney Horler

Sydney Horler (18 July 1888 – 27 October 1954) was a prolific British novelist specialising in thrillers. He was born in Leytonstone, Essex, and educated at Redcliffe School and Colston School in Bristol.

His first job was with Western Daily Press and Allied Newspapers in Bristol started in 1905. This lasted until 1911 when he left to become a special writer on the staff of Edward Hulton and Co. in Manchester. He moved to London to work on the Daily Mail and Daily Citizen in Fleet Street, although he also worked in the propaganda section of Air Intelligence towards the end of the First World War. When it ended he joined the editorial staff of George Newnes Ltd as a sub editor of the John O'London's Weekly. He didn't see eye to eye with the editor and after a big row in 1919 his employment was terminated.

He decided to become a full-time writer. He became a popular author with the publication, in 1925, of his first crime novel, The Mystery of No.1, and with novels such as Checkmate (1930). Horler's work was influenced by other popular thriller writers such as Edgar Wallace and "Sapper". His main hero was "Tiger" Standish, a character similar to Sapper's Bulldog Drummond. Horler's work began to be commercially successful after being serialised in the News of the World. By the 1930s, Horler's books had sold an estimated two million copies.

== Political views ==
Horler frequently used his work to put forward his opinions. He was a supporter of the British Monarchy and the Church of England (of which he was a member). Horler's works also incorporated his own prejudices. Watson notes both his fiction and non-fiction regularly express negative sentiments about non-English peoples. Horler's heroes, such as Tiger Standish, regularly use derogatory terms like "wogs" and "stinking Italianos", and Horler also expressed contempt for both the Americans and the French in his diaries. Writers such as Bill Pronzini and Malcolm Turnbull have noted that Horler's novels regularly featured negative depictions of Jews as criminals and racketeers, and he made denigrating comments about the Jewish community in his memoirs, Excitement: An Impudent Autobiography. Not even the rise of Nazism made any change to Horler's antisemitism; Turnbull points out Horler subscribes to "wartime slanders of Jew-Nazi collaboration and Jewish wartime profiteering in his 1940s titles". Horler's book Nighthawk Mops Up (1944) features a Jewish villain, Wilfred Abrahams, who collaborates with the Nazis.

Horler also expressed a disapproval of casual sex, especially homosexuality. Horler wrote to the British police demanding a crackdown on what he saw as "the alarming increase in sex perversion" in London, claiming the city's streets were full of male prostitutes. In his fiction, Horler spent a large amount of time emphasising how "virile" and "masculine" his heroes are. One of Horler's characters, the gentleman thief "Nighthawk", only steals jewels from women he sees as sexually immoral, pausing in his work to scrawl the word "Wanton" on their pillowcases.

== Critical reception ==
Literary reviewers of the time, such Dorothy L. Sayers and Compton Mackenzie, generally gave negative opinions on Horler's fiction. Horler's novels have not been popular since his death. Critics have taken issue with Horler's plots, described by William L. DeAndrea as "unbelievable"' (Horler himself claimed to "give old man coincidence's arm a frightful twist") and characters seen as clichéd. David Stafford describes Horler as "among the worst" of British thriller writers.

== Selected works ==
Horler wrote some 158 novels including:

- Standish of the Rangeland (1916)
- Goal! A Romance of the English Cup-Ties 1920
- The Breed of the Beverleys (1921)
- A Legend of the League (1922)
- Love, the Sportsman (vt: The Man with Two Faces) 1923
- McPhee, a Football Story (1923)
- The Ball of Fortune (1925) – adapted into a film The Ball of Fortune in 1926
- The Mystery of No. 1 (1925)
- School! School! (1925)
- False-Face (1926)
- The House of Secrets (1926)
- The Man Who Saved the Club (1926)
- On the Ball (1926)
- The Black Heart (1927)
- The Fellow Hagan! (1927)
- In the Dark (1927)
- Vivanti (1927)
- Chipstead of the Lone Hand (1928)
- The Curse of Doone (1928)
- Miss Mystery (1928)
- The Thirteenth Hour (1928)(novelization of 1927 film w/Lionel Barrymore)
- Heart Cut Diamond (1929)
- Lady of the Night (1929)
- The Secret Service Man (1929)
- The Worst Man in the World (1929)
- Checkmate (1930)
- Danger's Bright Eyes (1930)
- The Evil Chateau (1930)
- The Exploits of Peter (1930)
- The Murder Mask (1930)
- A Pro's Romance (1930)
- The Screaming Skull (1930)
- Tiger Standish (1932)
- Beauty and the Policeman: A collection of stories (1933)
- Tiger Standish Comes Back (1934)
- The Secret Agent (1934)
- The Vampire (1935)
- They Called Him Nighthawk (1937)
- Terror on Tip-Toe (1939)
- Tiger Standish Takes the Field (1939)
- The Return of Nighthawk (1940)
- Tiger Standish Steps on It (1940)
- Nighthawk Strikes to Kill (1941)
- Tiger Standish Does His Stuff (1941)
- Danger Preferred (1942)
- Now Let Us Hate (1942)
- Tiger Standish Has a Party (1943)
- Springtime Comes to William: A Comedy (1943)
- The Lady with the Limp (1944)
- The Man with Dry Hands (1944)
- Nighthawk Mops Up (1944)
- Sinister Street (1944)
- A Bullet for the Countess (1945)
- Marry the Girl (1945)
- Murder for Sale (1945)
- Virus X (1945)
- Terror Comes to Twelvetrees (1945)
- The Man Who Did Not Hang (1948)
- Nap On Nighthawk (1950)
- The Cage (1953)
- The Man Who Died Twice (1954)

== Non-Fiction ==
- The Umpire Adventure Book (1922)
- Black Souls: Narratives of crimes (1933)
- Excitement: An Impudent Autobiography (1933)
- Strictly Personal: An indiscreet diary (1934)
- London's underworld : the record of a month's sojourn in the crime centres of the metropolis (1934)
- More strictly personal (Six Months of My Life) (1935)
- Malefactor's row : a book of crime studies (1940)
- I Accuse the Doctors (1949)

He researched London's underworld by spending a month in the most crime-ridden parts of London.
