= Twelvetrees =

Twelvetrees is an English surname with possible origin in Cornwall or in Sussex. Notable people with this surname include:

- Billy Twelvetrees (born 1988), English rugby player
- Charles Twelvetrees (1872–1948), American artist and illustrator
- Harper Twelvetrees (1823–1881), British industrialist
- Helen Twelvetrees (1908–1958), American actress, daughter-in-law of Charles
- William Harper Twelvetrees (1848–1919), English-Australian geologist
