= Charles Eaton (American actor) =

American actor

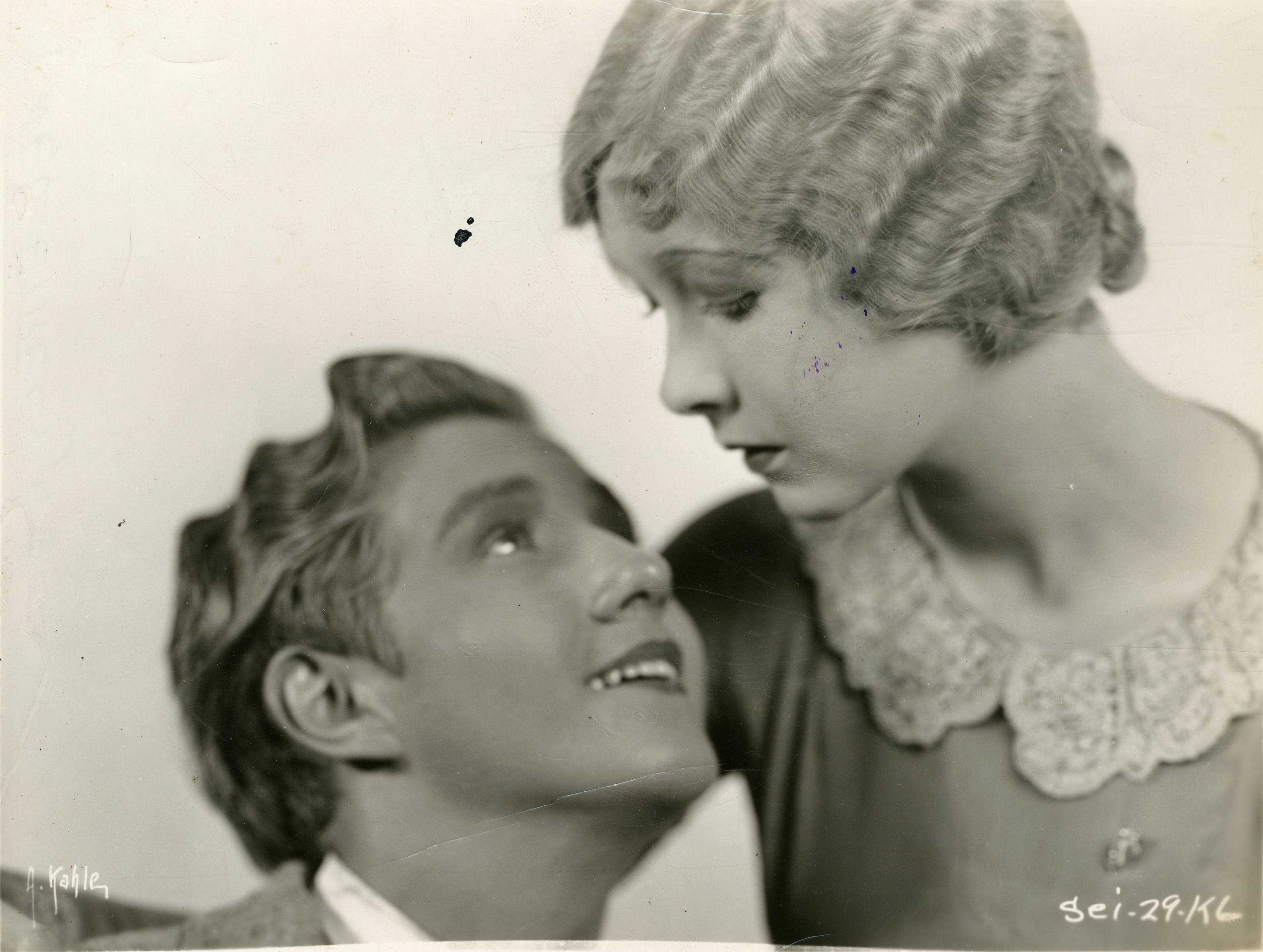
- Still from The Ghost Talks (1929) with Eaton and Helen Twelvetrees
- Born: June 22, 1910
- Died: August 15, 2004 (aged 94); Norman, Oklahoma U.S.
- Occupations: Stage and screen actor, vaudevillian, army air force officer
- Family: The Seven Little Eatons

Charles Eaton (June 22, 1910 – August 15, 2004) was an American juvenile stage and film performer, and the most important performing male member of the sibling clan once referred to as The Seven Little Eatons. At one time or another, all the siblings appeared in The Ziegfeld Follies each year between 1918 through 1923.

== Career ==
With his sister Doris, Eaton made his Broadway debut in the 1918 version of Mother Carey's Chickens. In a 1928 Broadway production called Skidding, which ran for 472 performances, Eaton created the role of Andy Hardy. Eaton acted in ten Broadway shows in total, including The Awakening and The Ziegfeld Follies of 1921, in which he shared the stage with W. C. Fields, A Royal Fandango, with Ethel Barrymore, Peter Pan, and Tommy. He also performed at vaudeville's storied Palace Theatre; toured in plays like Don't Count Your Chickens with Mary Boland; and acted during the 1920s and 30s in about 21 films, including features and short film, now mainly forgotten.

He began his film career in 1921, playing Wallace Reid as a child in Forever (1921), the first screen version of Gerald du Maurier's novel Peter Ibbetson. He successfully made the jump to 'talkies', and starred opposite Helen Twelvetrees as the correspondence-school detective in the comedy The Ghost Talks (1929), which was Fox Film Corporation's first talking picture; and as Marguerite Churchill's brother in Harmony at Home (1930). His last film role was in 1940.

Offers from both Broadway and Hollywood dried up with the arrival of the Great Depression, and eventually Eaton turned to alcohol, as did his sisters Pearl and Broadway star, Mary Eaton. Mary died in 1948 of liver problems brought on by her drinking, and Pearl was tragically murdered a decade later, but, although the case was ruled a homicide, the crime has never been solved.

== Later life ==
Long after his showbiz career was over, Eaton served as a captain in the Army Air Corps in Foggia, Italy during World War II. Following the war, he went into business with his sister Doris, who operated a thriving Arthur Murray Dance Studios franchise in Detroit, and did occasional theatrical engagements. In 2003, with his sister Doris, he co-wrote an Eaton family memoir entitled The Days We Danced. He died the following year in Norman, Oklahoma aged 94.

== Partial filmography ==
- Forever (1921)
- The Prodigal Judge (1922)
- The Dancing Town (1928)
- The Ghost Talks (1929)
- Joy Street (1929)
- Knights Out (1929)
- Harmony at Home (1930)
- Poor Little Rich Boy (1932)
- The Divorce Racket (1932)
- Enlighten Thy Daughter (1934)
