= Dance Girl Dance =

1933 film directed by Frank Strayer

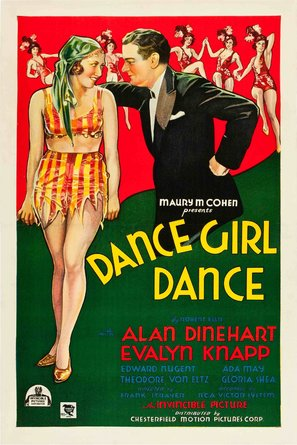
- Poster for the film
- Directed by: Frank Strayer
- Written by: Robert Ellis
- Based on: a story by: creator of the original work; Robert Ellis
- Produced by: Maury M. Cohen
- Starring: Alan Dinehart; Evalyn Knapp; Edward Nugent
- Cinematography: M. A. Anderson
- Edited by: Roland Reed
- Music by: Lee Zahler
- Production company: Invincible Pictures Corp.
- Distributed by: Chesterfield Motion Pictures Corp.
- Release date: September 1, 1933 (US)
- Running time: 7 reels
- Country: United States
- Language: English

Dance Girl Dance is a 1933 American pre-Code musical film directed by Frank Strayer from an original screenplay by Robert Ellis. The picture stars Alan Dinehart, Evalyn Knapp, and Edward Nugent, and premiered on September 1, 1933.

== Plot ==
"Pitter and Pat" are a Vaudeville song and dance team composed of Joe Pitt and Sally Patter, who live together, although they are unmarried. After a show in a small town, Joe blames Sally for their lack of success, and runs off with Cleo Darville, a showgirl in another act. Unbeknownst to Joe is that Sally is pregnant. Sally goes to New York and talks to their agent, Lou Kendall, who gets her a job as a chorus girl in the Carlton Nightclub, owned by "Val" Wade Valentine. Val falls in love with Sally, who wants to be given a chance to star in the show. Val is impressed with her, and asks her to understudy Claudette, the star of the show and the mistress of Phil Norton, who is the money behind the show. Just as she is beginning to show her abilities, she passes out during a dance number, and it is discovered she is pregnant. Val gives her the money so that she can go away and have her child. After the birth of her child, she returns to New York, where she becomes a star in the show.

One night, Joe returns to New York, having broken up with Cleo. He sees Sally in the show, but is down on his luck and looking for work. That night, Val proposes to Sally, but she tells him she needs to think about it. Joe appears, without revealing their relationship, Sally convinces Val to give Joe a shot. Joe visits Sally at her apartment, and finds out about the baby. He offers to come back if she will ever forgive him and take him back. After he leaves, Val arrives and proposes again, letting her know that he knows about the baby, but it does not matter. She politely declines his offer of marriage.

Joe has gotten a job singing to sell soap. Val finds him and offers him a job. He is in an act with another man, but the act fails. However, when the orchestra plays the song that Sally had composed, and she joins him from her box seat, they are a success. The act is reformed and Sally marries Joe.

== Cast ==
- Alan Dinehart as "Val" Wade Valentine
- Evalyn Knapp as Sally Patter
- Edward Nugent as Joe Pitt
- Ada May as Claudette
- Mae Busch as Lou Kendall
- Theodore von Eltz as Phil Norton
- Gloria Shea as Cleo Darville
- George Grandee as Mozart

== Production ==
In July 1933 it was announced that Alan Dinehart and Ada May had been contracted to star in the film. Maury Cohen, the producer, was also attempting to add Sari Maritza and Skeets Gallagher to the cast. In early August, it was announced that Frank Strayer was directing for Invincible Pictures, and it was being produced at Mack Sennett Studios. Also added to the cast were Evalyn Knapp, Edward Nugent, Gloria Shea, Theodore von Eltz, and George Grandee. Pearl Eaton was signed on to do to the choreography, with songs by Harry Carroll. Lee Zahler was hired to supervise the film's music, and co-wrote the theme song to the film, "Seeing is Believing". The film premiered on September 1, 1933.

== Reception ==
Harrison's Reports gave the film a good review, calling it "a well produced independent picture..." which was "...good entertainment". They enjoyed the musical numbers and felt it held the attention of the audience. They complimented the ability of Ada May, but felt that the acting of Evalyn Knapp was sub-par. Hollywood Filmograph gave the film a glowing review, praising the acting of Knapp and Alan Dinehart. They particularly enjoyed the work of Mae Busch and Ada May, and also praised Gloria Shea, Eddie Nugent, as well as the comedic musical talents of George Grandee. They enjoyed the musical numbers and especially gave praise to choreographer Pearl Eaton and cinematographer M. A. Anderson.
