= When Alexander Takes His Ragtime Band to France =

- Sheet music cover, 1918

Song
- Written: 1918
- Songwriter(s): Edgar Leslie, Cliff Hess, Alfred Bryan

"When Alexander Takes His Ragtime Band to France" is a World War I era song written by Alfred Bryan, Cliff Hess, and Edgar Leslie in 1918. The song was performed by Marion Harris and released as a single by Victor Records in June 1918.

== Sheet music ==
Albert Barbelle provided the cover illustration for the sheet music, which features a drawing of a marching band. Belle Baker is featured in the photograph inset.

== Reception ==
Marion Harris' performance of When Alexander Takes His Ragtime Band to France reached number four on the US song charts in 1918. (Note: Joel Whitburn's methodology for creating pre-1940s chart placings has been criticised, and they should not be taken as definitive.)

== See also ==
- Alexander's Ragtime Band
