= Ada May Weeks =

American actress

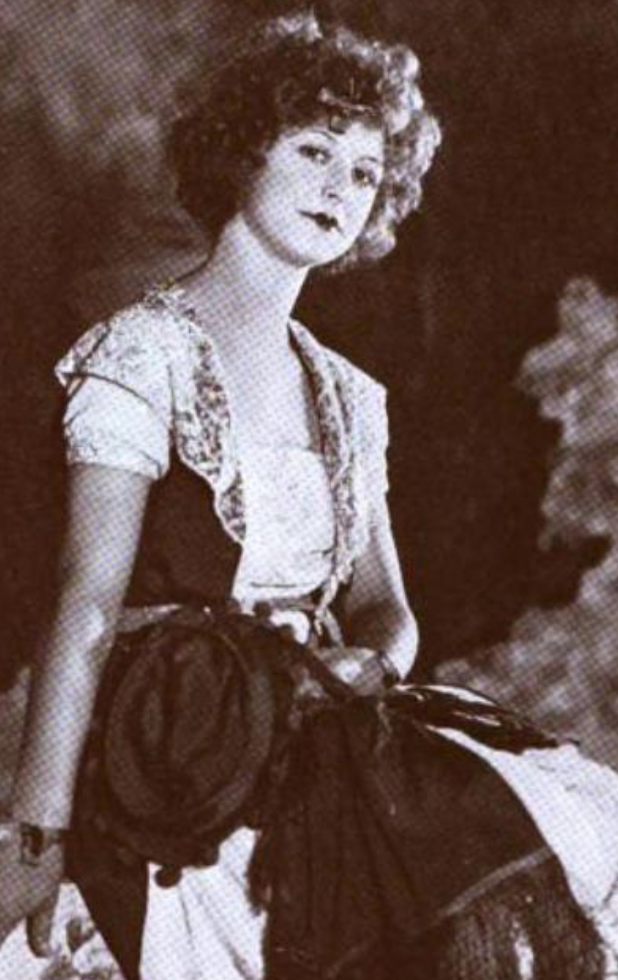
- Ada May Weeks, from a 1922 publication
- Born: March 8, 1896; Oyster Bay, New York
- Died: April 25, 1978 (aged 82); New York City
- Other names: Ada May, Ada Mae Weeks, Ada May Potter, Ada May Castegnaro
- Occupation(s): Actress, dancer, musical comedy performer

Ada May Weeks Potter Castegnaro (March 8, 1896 – April 25, 1978), sometimes billed as Ada May or Ada Mae Weeks, or referred to as the Countess Castegnaro, was an American actress and dancer, on stage, film, and radio.

== Early life ==
Weeks was born in Oyster Bay, New York, the daughter of Charles Meeks and Ada M. Thomson Weeks. She started dancing as a very young child. Her sisters Marion, Grace, and Ruth also became actresses.

== Career ==
Weeks was a dancer, actress, and musical comedy performer. She used the name "Ada May" on advice from Zelda Sears. Her stage credits included roles in Around the Map (1915 –1916, as understudy for Marilyn Miller), Come to Bohemia (1916), Miss Springtime (1916 –1917), Miss 1917 (1917), Listen, Lester (1918–1919, dancing with Clifton Webb), Jim Jam Jems (1920–1921), The O'Brien Girl (1921 –1922), Lollipop (1924), Rio Rita (1927–1928), and The Good Fairy (1932–1933). She appeared in the films The Dancing Town (1928), The Shaming of the True (1930), Dance, Girl, Dance (1933), and Monsieur Verdoux (1947), and was seen on television in Fireside Theatre (1950). She also performed on radio programs.

In 1920, Weeks sued impresario John Cort for back pay. She also sought a court order to keep Cort from claiming she was under contract to him; his claims were preventing her from finding another theatrical role.

== Personal life ==
Weeks married twice. Her first husband was American sportsman and big game hunter Wilson Potter; they married in 1924 and divorced in 1932. Her second husband was an Italian film editor, Count Mario Castegnaro; they married in California in 1946. They were still married when she died in 1978, at the age of 82, at her home in New York City.
