= The Dancing Town =

1928 film

- Directed by: Edmund Lawrence
- Written by: Adeline Leitzbach or Rupert Hughes
- Produced by: Eugene Spitz
- Starring: Helen Hayes
- Distributed by: Paramount Pictures
- Release date: October 27, 1928
- Running time: 20 minutes (2 reels, c. 200 ft.)
- Country: United States
- Language: English

The Dancing Town is a 1928 two-reeler film, starring Helen Hayes. It was Humphrey Bogart's film debut.

== Plot ==
Younger and slightly older children compete against each other in a dance competition. Children from the Pepperall and Hopperday families participate in the tournament, fully supported in every way by their respective family members. Later on, the adults take to the dance floor as well.

== Cast ==
- Helen Hayes as Olive Pepperall
- Clarence Nordstrom as Hopperday, Jr.
- Ada May Weeks as Prue Pepperall (credited as Ada May)
- Hal Skelly as Tom Kinch
- Harry Beresford as Pa Pepperall
- Elizabeth Patterson as Ma Pepperall
- Jefferson De Angelis as Jake
- George Le Guere as Olive's Dance Partner
- Dallas Welford as Judge Hopperday
- Josephine Drake as Ma Hopperday
- Charles Eaton as Horace Pepperall
- Harry Short as Honest Deacon Flynn
- Humphrey Bogart as Man in Doorway at Dance

== Film preservation ==
The UCLA Film and Television Archive has a complete preservation copy of the film.
