= The Seven Little Eatons =

American stage performer family

The Seven Little Eatons was a family of young American stage performers in the early part of the twentieth century.

Although they were called The Seven Little Eatons, in fact only five of the siblings embarked on a career in showbiz.

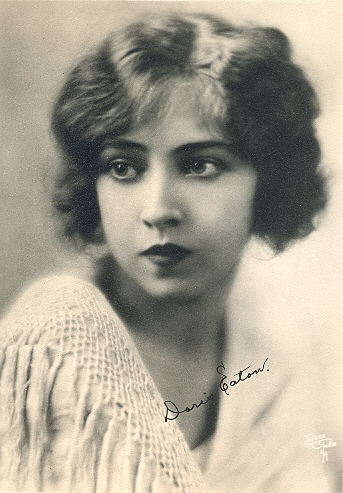
Doris Eaton Travis in 1922

== Early days ==
The Eatons were born to Mary and Charles Eaton between 1894 and 1910 in Norfolk, Virginia, and began their careers in show business in 1911, when three of the children, Doris, Mary, and Pearl, were hired to appear in a production of Maurice Maeterlinck's fantasy play The Blue Bird at the Shubert Belasco Theatre in Washington.

After The Blue Bird closed, the sisters, younger brother Joe and cousin Avery, began appearing regularly in various plays and melodramas for the Poli stock company. Doris Eaton Travis, in her memoirs, noted that "the local stock managers at the Poli theatres knew that if you needed three or four or more children, you could call Mama Eaton and get them all in one place." The Eaton girls sometimes portrayed male roles; brother Joe sometimes portrayed female characters and was billed as "Josephine." They quickly gained reputations as professional, reliable and versatile actors, and were rarely out of work.

== The Ziegfeld Follies, theatre and film ==
As their careers flourished, the Eatons moved to New York and, gradually, began performing in adult roles in musical theatre productions and silent films. They had a special connection to the Ziegfeld Follies: between 1918 and 1922, at least one Eaton was a member of the Follies cast.

In the 1930s, with the advent of talkies, the decline of the Follies and the advent of the Great Depression, the careers of the Eaton siblings declined. Several struggled with alcoholism and drug addiction; others went on to careers in the United States military and the Arthur Murray chain of dance schools.

== Memoirs ==
Doris Eaton Travis, at an advanced age, still performed annually on Broadway in benefits for Broadway Cares/Equity Fights AIDS. She wrote a memoir about her family, entitled The Days We Danced (2003) with her brother Charles, who died in 2004. Doris died on May 11, 2010, at the age of 106.

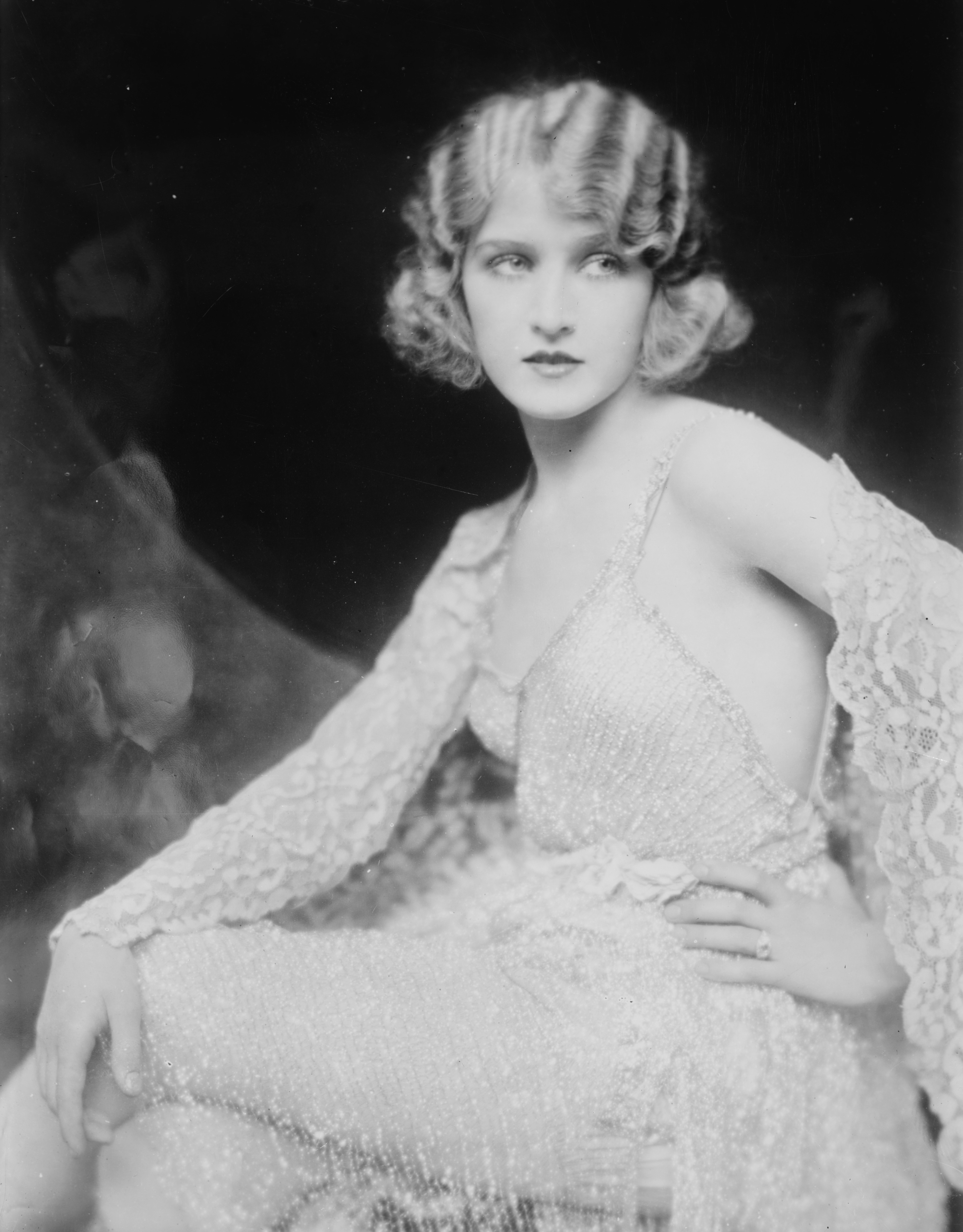
Mary Eaton, actress, singer and dancer

== The Eaton Family Siblings ==
Although the family was called the "Seven Little Eatons," in fact only five of the children were actively involved in show business.

- Charles Eaton (1910–2004)
- Doris Eaton Travis (1904–2010)
- Evelyn Eaton Mills (1894–1980) was the eldest of the Eaton siblings. While she was never a performer herself, she was perhaps somewhat responsible for the Eaton family's entrance into show business: she brought her three sisters to audition for their first show, The Blue Bird. She became, somewhat reluctantly, the "second mother" to the performing children of the family, and was compelled by her parents to leave school to look after them.

Evelyn married Bob Mills in 1916; they had three children, Edwin, Warren and Evelynne (also credited as Evelyn Eaton, 1924 - 1964). All three children had successful careers as juvenile actors on Broadway. Doris Eaton Travis, in her memoirs, notes that Evelyn was a very aggressive stage mother, and eventually ended up alienating her children. Evelyn was the last person ever to sign a contract with Flo Ziegfeld, on behalf of her daughter, who played the character of Kim as a child in a 1932 revival of Show Boat. The younger Evelyn Eaton is also notable for hosting Hour Glass, the oldest surviving television variety show and the first to fill a full hour time slot.

- Joseph Eaton (1905–1998) began his career at the age of five in Mrs. Wiggs and the Cabbage Patch. From 1912 to 1914, he appeared in nearly twenty different productions with the Poli Stock Company and elsewhere, often alongside one or more of his sisters. Joe performed in the 1921 edition of the Ziegfeld Follies, replacing his younger brother Charlie. However, unlike the other Eaton siblings, he did not pursue show business as an adult.

He attended the University of Pennsylvania, where he performed with the Mask and Wig Society. After college, he worked with RKO Studios, joined the Civilian Conservation Corps, and worked as an Arthur Murray dance instructor. During World War II he enlisted in the US Army, where he worked under the command of General Dwight D. Eisenhower, rose to the rank of lieutenant colonel and was awarded a Bronze Star. After the war, he returned to work as a dance teacher in one of the Arthur Murray schools owned by his sister Doris. He was married to wife Lucille for over fifty years, and was the father of two children.

- Mary Eaton (1901–1948)
- Pearl Eaton Levant (1898–1958)
- Robert Eaton (1896–1935), the eldest Eaton son, was not involved in show business. He served in the US Army during World War I, and later formed a maintenance service with his wife. He died of pneumonia in 1935.
