= Unmarried (1939 film) =

1939 film by Kurt Neumann

- Directed by: Kurt Neumann
- Written by: Grover Jones; William Slavens McNutt; Lillie Hayward; Brain Marlow
- Starring: Helen Twelvetrees; Buck Jones; Donald O'Connor
- Cinematography: Harry Fischbeck
- Edited by: Stuart Gilmore
- Music by: John Leipold
- Distributed by: Paramount Pictures
- Release date: May 20, 1939
- Running time: 63 minutes
- Country: United States
- Language: English

Unmarried is a 1939 American film directed by Kurt Neumann and starring Helen Twelvetrees, Buck Jones and Donald O'Connor.

== Plot ==
Nightclub hostess Pat Rogers and her boxer boyfriend Slag Bailey are not sure what to do after their associate Pins Streaver tries to rob a safe and dies in the act.

They travel together to Pins' home in the country, where 12-year-old Ted Streaver returns from school, unaware that his father is dead. Intending to stay a short while, Pat and Slag pretend to be a married couple and become the boy's foster parents.

Ted grows up to become a football hero in school, but trouble arises when Cash Enright, an unscrupulous boxing promoter, appears and tries to persuade Ted to step into the ring. Slag is socked on the jaw by the kid but ultimately succeeds in convincing him not to fight.

== Cast ==
- Helen Twelvetrees as Pat Rogers
- Buck Jones as Slag Bailey
- Donald O'Connor as Ted Streaver
- Virginia Vale as Betty
- Larry Crabbe as Buzz Kinney
- Robert Armstrong as Pins Streaver
- John Hartley as Ted Streaver
- Ed Pawley as Swade
- Sidney Blackmer as Cash Enright

Unbilled players include Janet Waldo, Emory Parnell and Lucien Littlefield.

== Critical reception ==
A contemporary review in Variety reported that the film "emerges as an entertaining offering" that "gains in immediate interest with fast-paced opening" and has "a neat mixture of warm sentimentality with some rousing action episodes." The review further describes Neumann's direction as "strid[ing] through on a straight, clear-cut line with few soft spots," Twelvetrees performance as handled in "fine fashion," and "Jones does okay as the mugg fighter."
