= Her Man (1930 film) =

1930 film

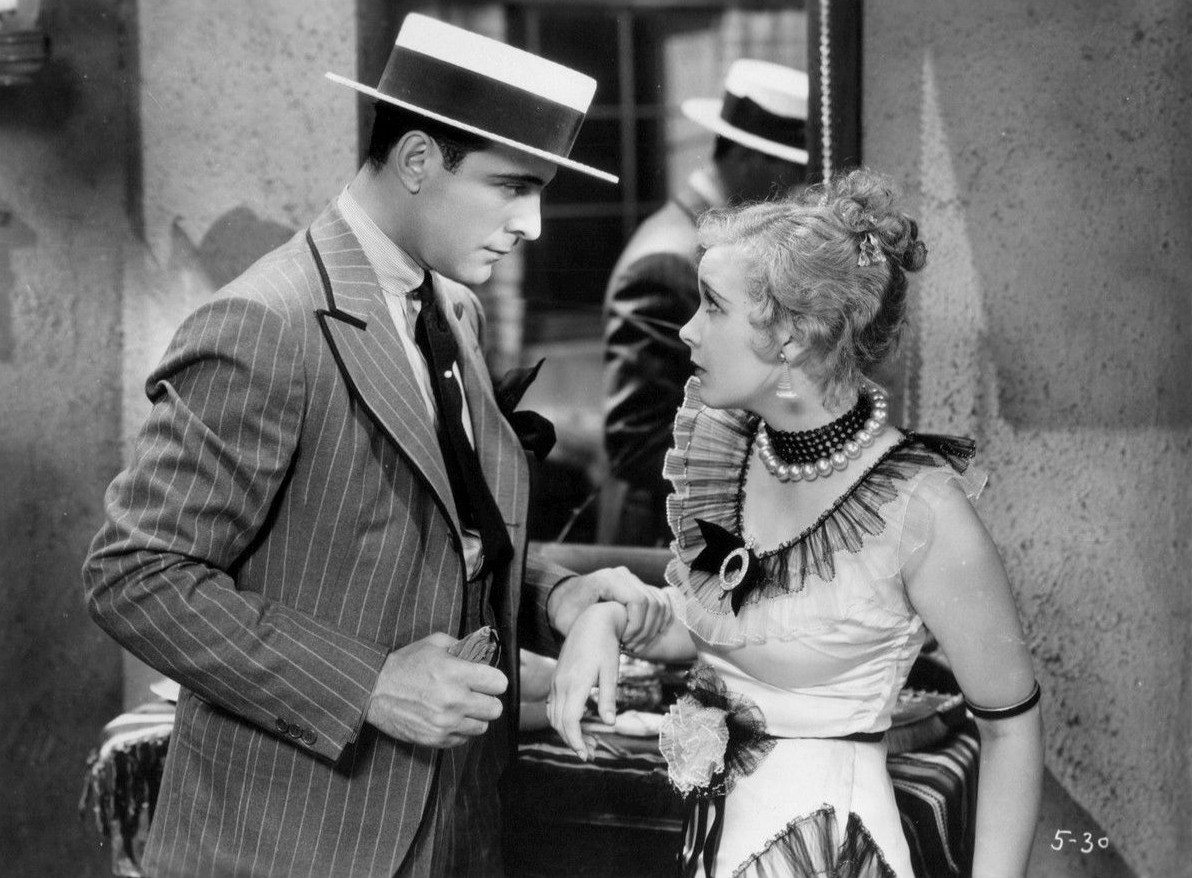
- Ricardo Cortez and Helen Twelvetrees
- Directed by: Tay Garnett
- Written by: Tom Buckingham
- Story by: Tay Garnett; Howard Higgin
- Produced by: E. B. Derr
- Starring: Phillips Holmes; Helen Twelvetrees; Marjorie Rambeau
- Cinematography: Edward Snyder
- Edited by: Doane Harrison; Joseph Kane
- Music by: Josiah Zuro
- Production company: Pathé Exchange
- Distributed by: Pathé Exchange
- Release date: September 21, 1930
- Running time: 85 minutes
- Country: United States
- Language: English

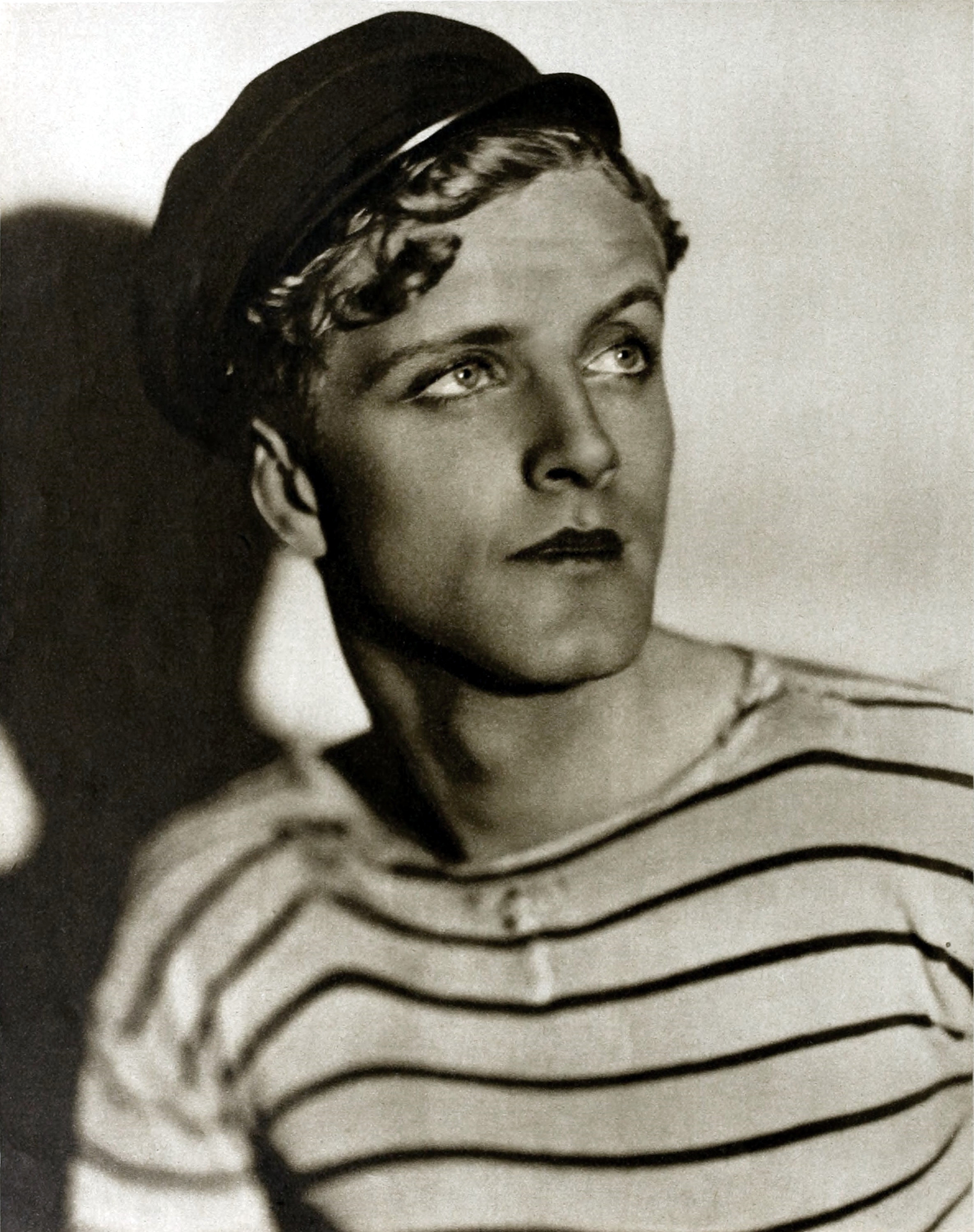
Phillips Holmes in Her Man (1930)

Her Man is a 1930 American pre-Code drama film produced and distributed by Pathé Exchange, directed by Tay Garnett and starring Phillips Holmes, Helen Twelvetrees and Marjorie Rambeau. The film is inspired by the ballad Frankie and Johnny. The picture's supporting cast features James Gleason, Ricardo Cortez, Thelma Todd and Franklin Pangborn.

At least one copy is preserved at the Library of Congress. The original camera negative, rediscovered in the 2010s, has been scanned and restored at 4K resolution by Sony Pictures Entertainment, in partnership with the Film Foundation and RT features.

== Plot ==
A Havana prostitute with a sadistic "protector" falls for a young sailor.

== Cast ==
- Helen Twelvetrees as Frankie Keefe
- Phillips Holmes as Dan Keefe
- Marjorie Rambeau as Annie
- James Gleason as Steve
- Ricardo Cortez as Johnnie
- Harry Sweet as Eddie
- Slim Summerville as The Swede
- Thelma Todd as Nelly
- Franklin Pangborn as Sport
- Stanley Fields as Al
- Matthew Betz as Red
- Mike Donlin as Bartender
- George Chandler as Barfly

== Reception ==
Writing in The New York Times on the release of a restored version of the film, the critic J. Hoberman says that the film was well received when it was released and that it was a favorite of Henri Langlois of the Cinémathèque Française. However, it received harsh criticism by the Cuban government and local US Latin press because of the stereotypical distortions it presented about Cuba in general. Hoberman calls out the use of tracking shots in the film, as also does Farran Smith Nehme in Film Comment. The MOMA film curator David Kehr called the "constantly moving camera" 10 years ahead of its time. Nehme describes the film as a "brawling, sleazy pre-Code" and that Garnet successfully "weaves in tenderness" into what is also a romantic film.

== Popular culture ==
Still-married actress Helen Twelvetrees met her second husband, stuntman Jack Woody, on set while filming Her Man. The ensuing marriage would produce another bevy of tabloid material centered on the young starlet.
