= The Ghost Talks (1929 film) =

1929 film

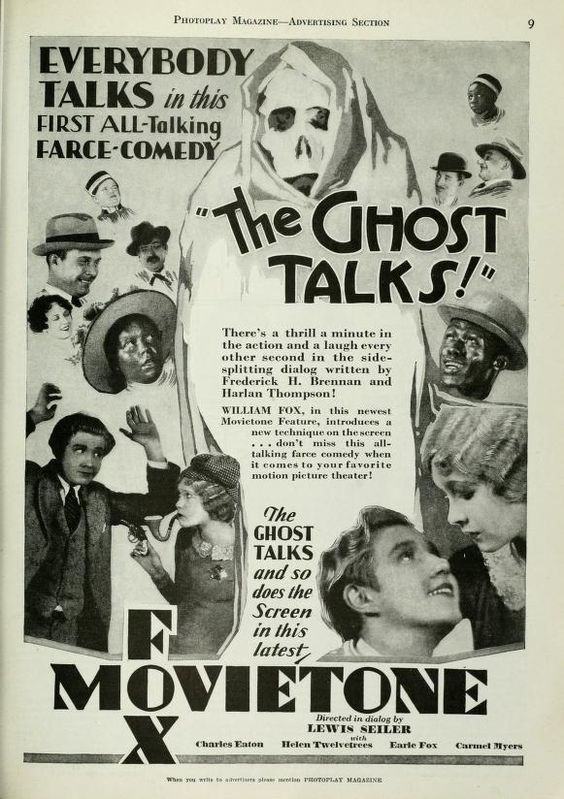
- Advertisement
- Directed by: Lewis Seiler
- Written by: Frederick Hazlitt Brennan; Harlan Thompson (dialog)
- Based on: Badges by Edward Hammond and Max Marcin
- Starring: Helen Twelvetrees; Carmel Myers
- Cinematography: George Meehan
- Distributed by: Fox Film Corporation
- Release date: February 24, 1929
- Running time: 61 minutes
- Country: United States
- Language: English

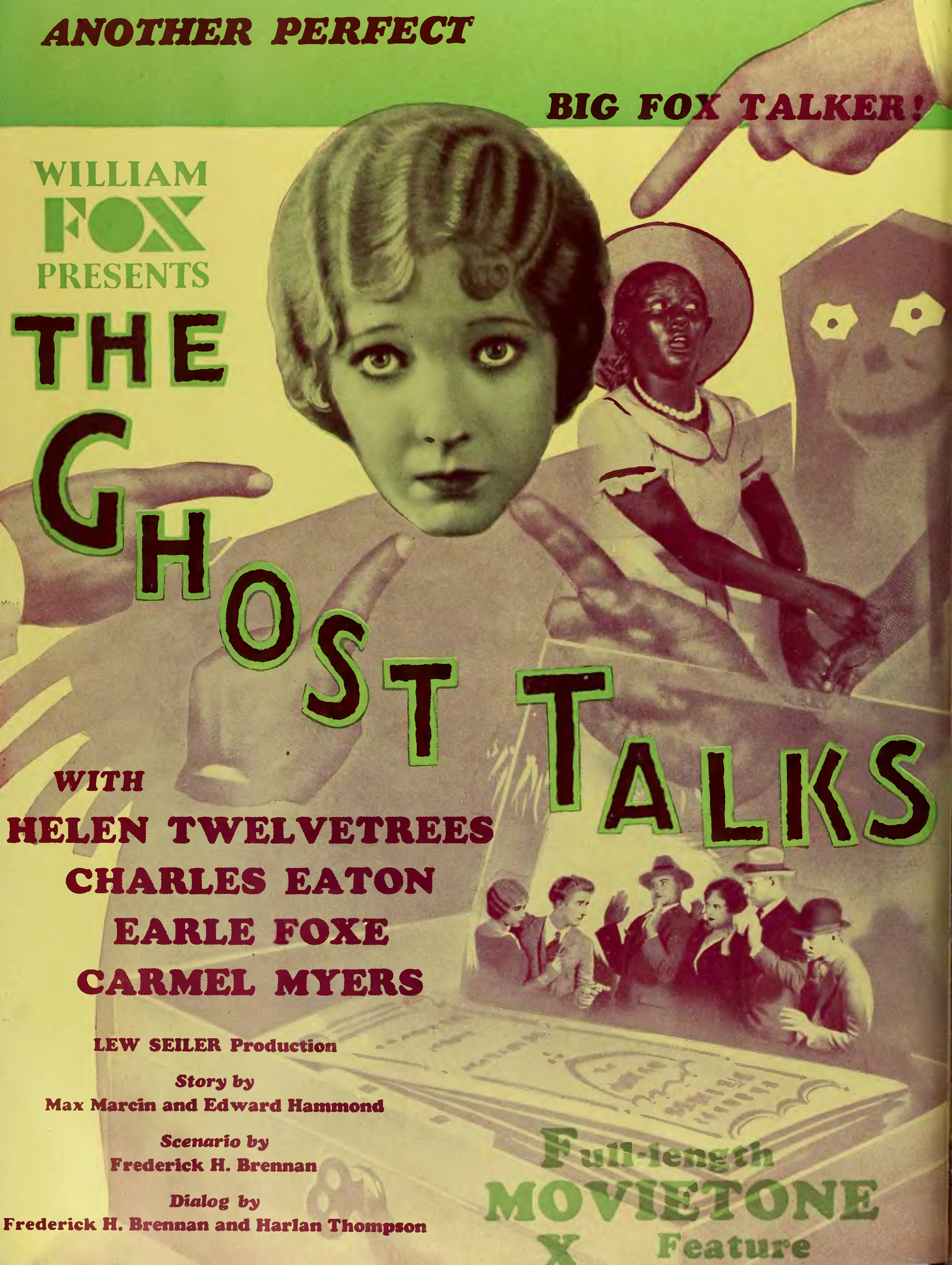
Advertisement from The Film Daily, 1929

The Ghost Talks is a 1929 American sound (All-Talking) comedy film directed by Lewis Seiler based on a Max Marcin and Edward Hammond's Broadway play. Actor Stepin Fetchit played a character named "Christopher Lee" in this early talkie. Because not all theaters had been converted to sound, it was also released as a silent film. Despite the title, there are no ghosts in the film.

According to the New York Times review, this was the second all-talking feature from Fox Films, featuring various plot devices, like a lisping heroine, to show off its Movietone sound system. This film is regarded as lost.

== Plot ==
As described in a newspaper review, heiress Miriam Holt, who is searching for some bonds that her deceased uncle had taken so that she can return the stolen property, checks into a suburban hotel. She is assisted by private detective Franklyn Green, who learned his craft by a correspondence course and believes that he can identify criminals by the automobiles that they drive. Of course, when Heimie Heimrath, Joe Talles, and Peter Accardi, the former criminal associates of the late uncle arrive, Franklyn is tricked into helping them. When Franklyn finally identifies the men as being wanted by the police, no one at the hotel will believe him. Miriam and Franklyn go to a house, which is said to be haunted, where they believe the bonds are hidden and run into Christopher Lee and his bride Isobel. The criminals follow them and create mayhem by scaring the occupants, resulting in an ending that is fast and amusing when Franklyn locates the bonds using his scientific methods and the police arrive to arrest the criminals, leaving Miriam and Franklyn to pursue their romance.

== Cast ==
- Helen Twelvetrees as Miriam Holt
- Charles Eaton as Franklyn Green
- Carmel Myers as Marie Haley
- Stepin Fetchit as Christopher Lee
- Earle Foxe as Heimie Heimrath
- Henry Sedley as Joe Talles
- Joe E. Brown as Peter Accardi
- Clifford Dempsey as John Keegan
- Baby Mack as Isobel Lee
- Arnold Lucy as Julius Bowser
- Bess Flowers as Sylvia
- Dorothy McGowan as Miss Eva
- Mickey Bennett as Bellboy
- Edgar Caldwell (uncredited)

== See also ==
- List of early sound feature films (1926–1929)
