= The Spanish Cape Mystery (film) =

1935 film by Lewis D. Collins

- Directed by: Lewis D. Collins
- Written by: Ellery Queen (Frederic Dannay and Manfred Lee) (novel); Albert DeMond
- Produced by: M.H. Hoffman
- Starring: Donald Cook; Helen Twelvetrees; Berton Churchill
- Cinematography: Gilbert Warrenton
- Edited by: Ernie Leadlay
- Music by: Mischa Bakaleinikoff
- Production company: Liberty Pictures
- Distributed by: Republic Pictures
- Release date: October 9, 1935
- Running time: 73 minutes
- Country: United States
- Language: English

The Spanish Cape Mystery is a 1935 American mystery film directed by Lewis D. Collins and starring Donald Cook, Helen Twelvetrees and Berton Churchill. It is based on the novel of the same name featuring the detective Ellery Queen.

== Plot ==
After unmasking a clever jewel thief for the benefit of his police inspector father, Ellery Queen and his friend Judge Macklin leave for what they hope will be a bachelor vacation on the California Coast. Macklin assures Queen that there is only one large mansion in the area where they will be staying. But when they arrive at their cabin, they find heiress Stella Godfrey gagged and bound to a chair.

Stella, while being driven back to her mansion explains that she has been resisting the efforts of all her family members to marry her off to the first available man. Only her uncle David seems to be sympathetic to her views. That night, a gunman abducts the two of them at gunpoint, left them tied in the cabin, and apparently escaped to sea in the family yacht.

When the grounds are searched, the dead body of society sponge John Marco is found on the patio, garroted to death some time ago and wearing only a bathing suit.

The next night, abusive husband George Munn is killed in a similar manner. His wife is the leading suspect. But Queen suspects the motive is inheritance money, not hate. Since the local sheriff seems to be going around in circles, Queen and Macklin interrupt their vacation to tackle the case.

Boston blueblood Leslie Court is then killed in his upstairs room even though he had been out of their sight for less than 15 minutes and all of the suspects were downstairs and their movements accounted for. Court, though ostensibly engaged to Stella, had also been courting one of the Godfrey family maids.

Stella receives a note that says if she wants her uncle back she should come to a deserted high balcony area of the estate. But Betty Blythe wanders into the meeting place area first, and she is pushed to her death by a masked assailant.

With Stella bravely acting as bait, the next night the killer enters her bedroom and walks into a police trap. It is the "missing" uncle Dave, who faked his abduction to divert suspicion from himself. Queen had learned from the family gardener that all the murders took place at high tide. Uncle Dave had been living on the "missing" yacht, and swam ashore at high tide time each night to commit the murders. For the first murder, he lingered too long and was stranded at low tide. He changed clothes with his victim; so he wouldn't look strange walking the streets in a bathing suit. He then dressed his other victims in bathing suits to keep up the misdirection.

Queen opines that while the first murder was committed for money, somewhere along the line Uncle Dave's mind snapped and he became a thrill killer who was even willing to kill the niece he loved.

== Cast ==
- Donald Cook as Ellery Queen
- Helen Twelvetrees as Stella Godfrey
- Berton Churchill as Judge Macklin
- Frank Sheridan as Walter Godfrey
- Harry Stubbs as Sheriff Moley
- Guy Usher as Inspector Queen
- Huntley Gordon as David Kummer
- Jack La Rue as Gardner
- Betty Blythe as Mrs. Godfrey
- Olaf Hytten as DuPre
- Ruth Gillette as Laura Constable
- Frank Leigh as Teller
- Barbara Bedford as Mrs. Munn
- George Baxter as John Marco
- Katherine Morrow as Pitts
- Arnold Gray as Leslie Court
- Donald Kerr as Hendricks
- Lee Prather as Officer Hunt
- George Cleveland as Jorum
- Arthur Aylesworth as George Munn
- Richard Cramer as Gunman
- Lee Phelps as Detective

== Bibliography ==
- Goble, Alan. The Complete Index to Literary Sources in Film. Walter de Gruyter, 1999.
