= Arthur Smith Woodward =

English palaeontologist (1864–1944)

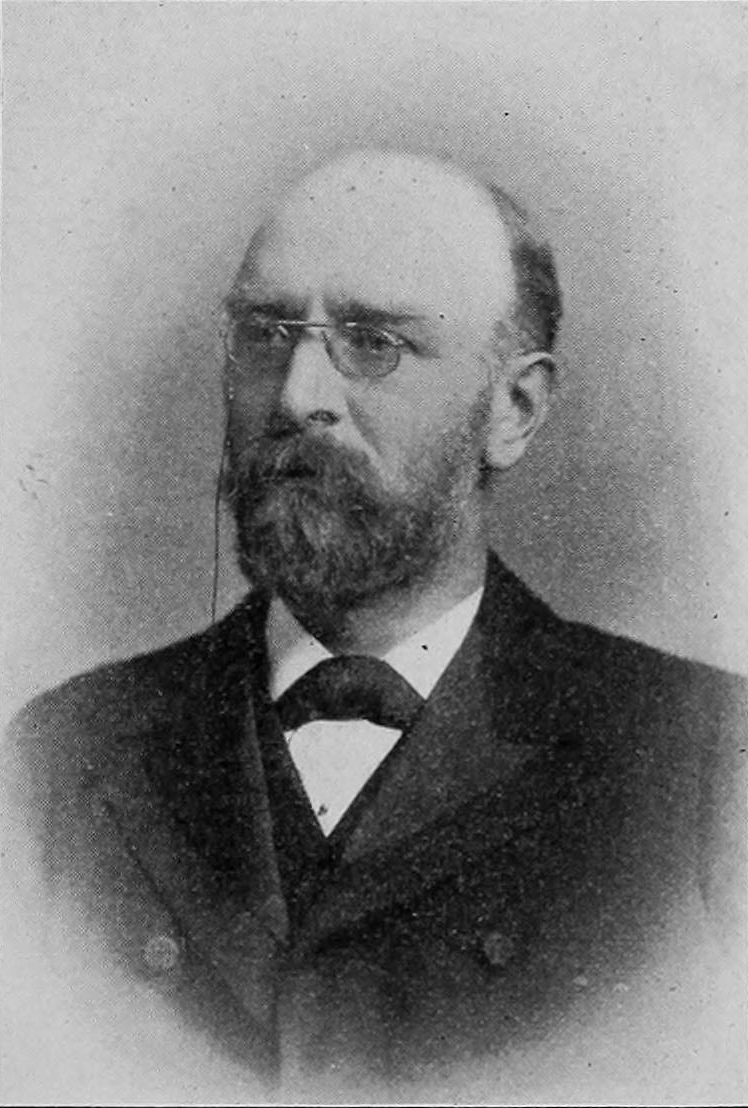
- Woodward before 1909
- Born: 23 May 1864; Macclesfield, Cheshire, England
- Died: 2 September 1944 (aged 80); Haywards Heath, Sussex, England
- Education: Victoria University of Manchester
- Known for: Prehistoric fish research, Piltdown Man
- Awards: Lyell Medal (1896); Clarke Medal (1914); Royal Medal (1917); Wollaston Medal (1924); Hayden Memorial Geological Award (1938); Linnean Medal (1940); Fellow of the Royal Society
- Scientific career
- Fields: Paleontology
- Workplaces: British Museum (Natural History)

Sir Arthur Smith Woodward, FRS (23 May 1864 – 2 September 1944) was an English palaeontologist, known as a world expert in fossil fish. He also described the Piltdown Man fossils, which were later determined to be fraudulent. He is not related to Henry Woodward, whom he replaced as curator of the Geology Department of the British Museum of Natural History.

== Biography ==
Woodward was born in Macclesfield, Cheshire, England and was educated there and at Owens College, Manchester. He joined the staff of the Department of Geology at the Natural History Museum in 1882. He became assistant Keeper of Geology in 1892, and Keeper in 1901. He was appointed Secretary of the Palaeontographical Society and in 1904, was appointed President of the Geological Society. He was elected in June 1901 a Fellow of the Royal Society

He was the world expert on fossil fish, writing his Catalogue of the Fossil Fishes in the British Museum (1889–1901). His travels included journeys to South America and Greece. In 1901, for the trustees of the Natural History Museum, he made excavations of fossil bones from Pikermi (near Athens). His contribution to palaeoichthyology resulted in him receiving many awards, including a Royal Medal from the Royal Society in 1917, the Lyell and Wollaston Medals of the Geological Society, the Linnean Medal of the Linnean Society, the Bolitho Medal of the Royal Geological Society of Cornwall and the Clarke Medal of the Royal Society of New South Wales. He retired from the museum in 1924 and was knighted in the 1924 Birthday Honours. In 1942 Woodward was awarded the Mary Clark Thompson Medal from the United States National Academy of Sciences.

Woodward's reputation suffered from his involvement in the Piltdown Man hoax where he gave a name to a new species of hominid from southern England, which was ultimately discovered (after Woodward's death) to have been a forgery.

Woodward was a leading advocate of orthogenesis. He believed there was a general trend in evolution from the fossil record and speculated that the human brain might have been the product of such a trend. He discussed his views on human evolution in his book The Earliest Englishman (1948).

He married Maud Leanora Ida Seeley, the daughter of zoologist Harry Govier Seeley, in 1894.

Woodward died in Haywards Heath, Sussex, in 1944 at the age of 80.

== Legacy ==
On 21 May 2014 a one-day symposium was held at the Natural History Museum in London to commemorate the 150th anniversary of Woodward's birth. Speakers were selected to give not just historical accounts of the man and his science but also accounts of how current research connects back to his influence. The proceedings of this symposium were published in March 2016.

== Collections ==
Woodward's library was purchased by University College London in 1945 with assistance from Marie Stopes. The collection spans c.2500 items; many books contain autograph letters to Woodward, including correspondence from Florentino Ameghino, Charles Barrois, Georg Baur, and Bashford Dean.

Awards
Preceded by William Harper Twelvetrees	Clarke Medal; 1914	Succeeded by William Aitcheson Haswell
