= Tell Your Children =

1922 film

- Directed by: Donald Crisp
- Written by: Leslie Howard Gordon; Rachel Macnamara
- Produced by: Martin Sabine
- Starring: Doris Eaton
- Production company: International Artists Film Company
- Distributed by: Famous Players–Lasky British Producers
- Release date: 1922
- Running time: 55 minutes
- Country: United Kingdom
- Language: Silent with English intertitles

Tell Your Children is a 1922 British drama film directed by Donald Crisp and starring Doris Eaton and Walter Tennyson. Alfred Hitchcock is credited as a title designer. It was the first film in which later Carry On actor Charles Hawtrey was to appear – he was aged eight at the time. The film is now lost.

== Cast ==
- Doris Eaton as Rosny Edwards
- Walter Tennyson as John Haslar
- Margaret Halstan as Lady Sybil Edwards
- Warwick Ward as Lord Belhurst
- Adeline Hayden Coffin as Nanny Dyson
- Gertrude McCoy as Maudie
- Mary Rorke as Susan Hasler
- A. Harding Steerman as vicar
- Cecil Morton York as Reuben Haslar
- Charles Hawtrey

== See also ==
- Alfred Hitchcock filmography
