= Hotel Le Marquis =

Hotel in Manhattan, New York

Coordinates: 40.74602°N 73.98519°W

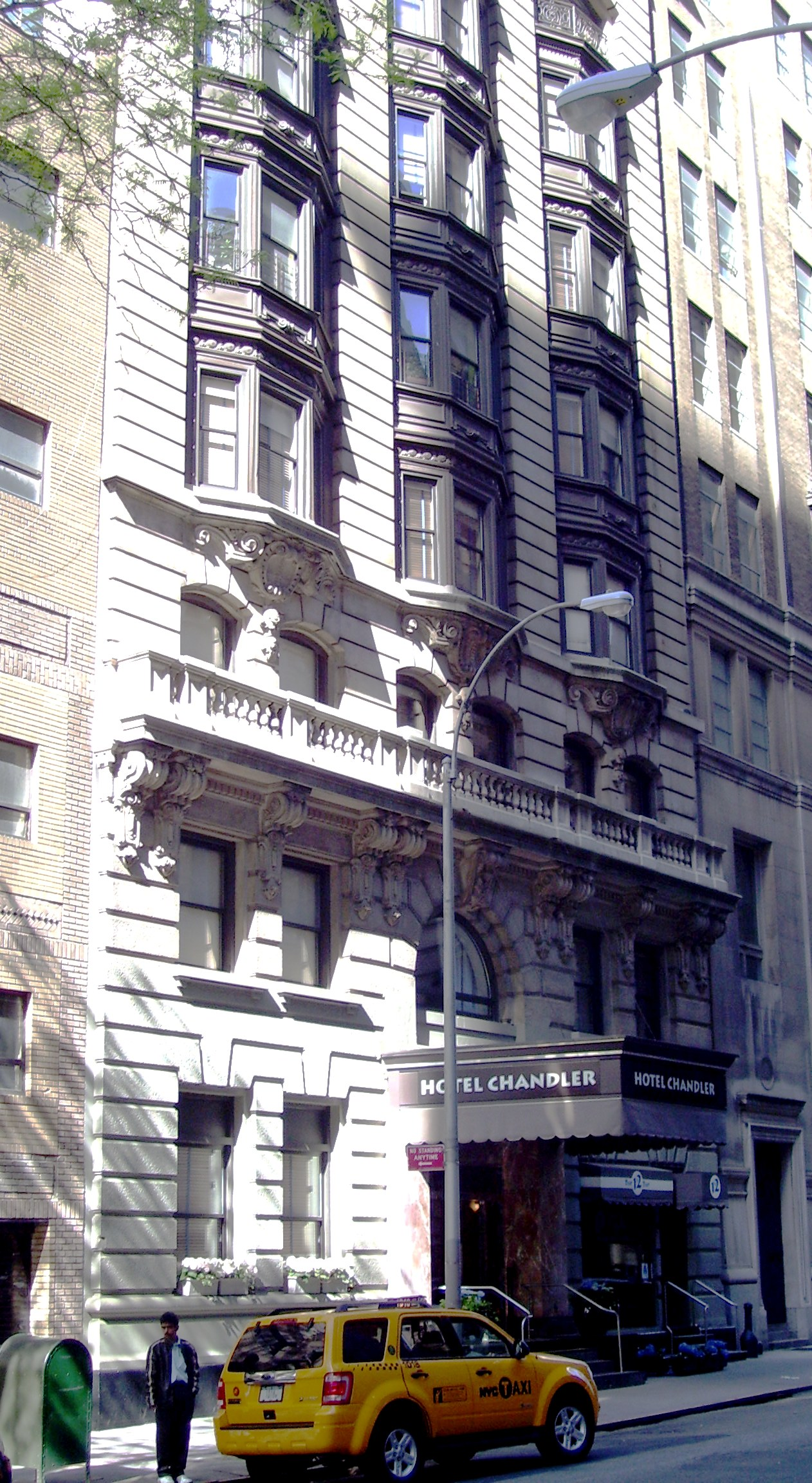
Hotel Chandler, 12 East 31 Street, 2011

Hotel Le Marquis is a 14-floor hotel in New York City at 12 East 31st Street and 131 Madison Avenue.

It was designed by the architect Albert Buchman and built in 1907.

Singer Marion Harris died in this hotel on April 23, 1944, from a fire that started when she fell asleep while smoking in bed.

Charles Twelvetrees, artist and illustrator, died on April 6, 1948, in the bathtub of his room, due to natural causes.

On November 21, 1955, the cartoonist and illustrator Gilbert Bundy killed himself in his apartment there, and "his body was found hanging by several neckties from a door hinge".

In 2004, it became Hotel Chandler. The hotel closed to the public in late 2017, entering use as a homeless shelter from January 2018 onward.
