= Mary Eaton =

American actress

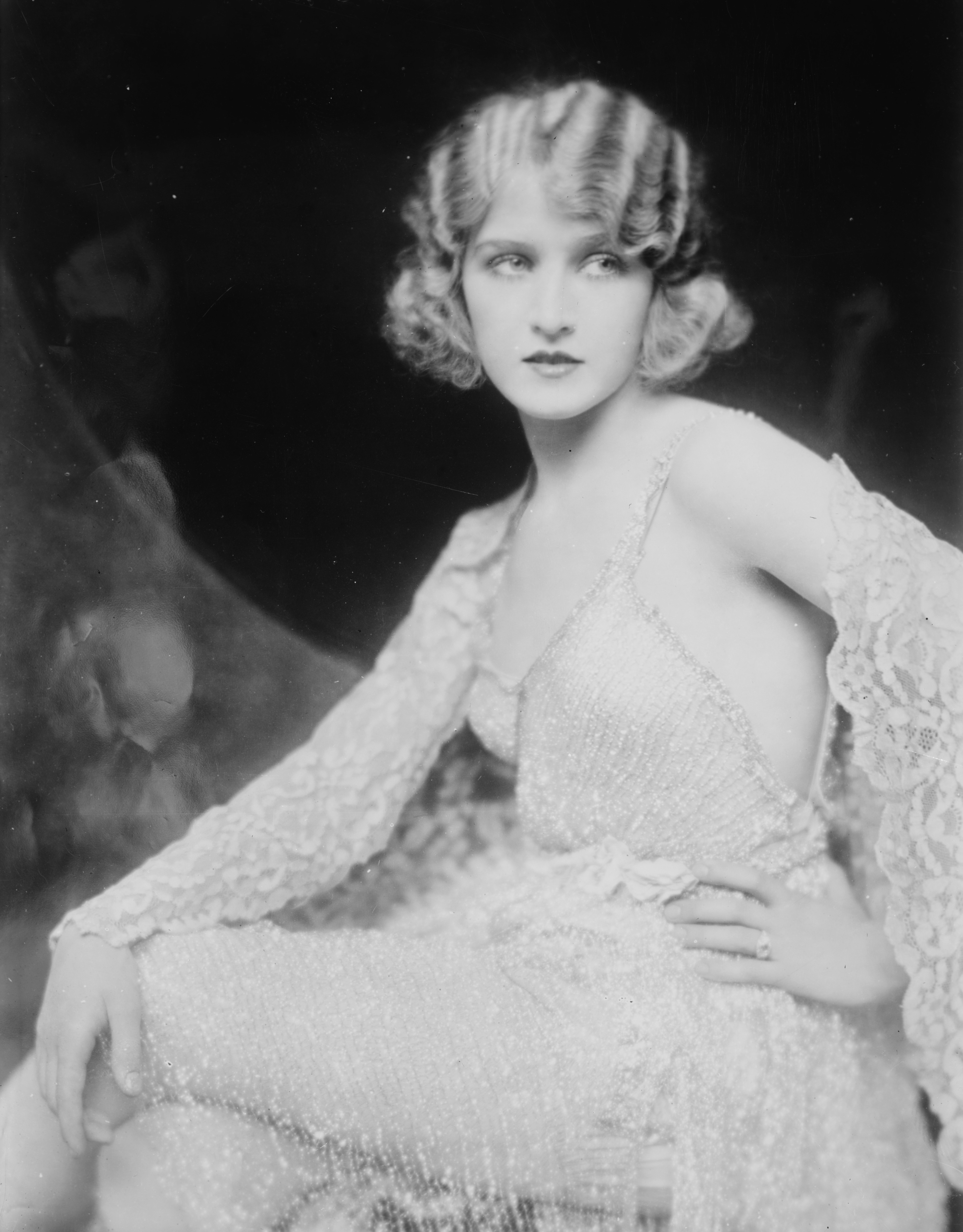
- Born: January 29, 1901; Norfolk, Virginia, U.S.
- Died: October 10, 1948 (aged 47); Hollywood, California, U.S.
- Other names: Actress; singer; dancer
- Years active: 1916–1932; 1942
- Spouses: Millard Webb (m. 1929; died 1935) Charles A. Emery (m. 1937; div. 1942) Eddie Laughton (m. 1944–1948)

Mary Eaton (January 29, 1901 – October 10, 1948) was an American stage and film actress, singer and dancer, most popular during the 1910s and 1920s. Eaton is probably best-known today for her appearance in the first Marx Brothers film, The Cocoanuts (1929). A professional performer since childhood, she enjoyed success in stage productions such as the Ziegfeld Follies. She appeared in another early sound film, Glorifying the American Girl (1929). Her career declined sharply during the 1930s.

== Biography ==
=== Early life and career ===
Born in Norfolk, Virginia in 1901, Eaton was seven years old when she began attending dance lessons in Washington, DC, along with her sisters Doris and Pearl. In 1911, all three sisters were hired for a production of Maurice Maeterlinck's fantasy play The Blue Bird at the Shubert Belasco Theatre in Washington, D.C. Eaton's appearance in the show marked the beginning of her career in professional theatre.

After The Blue Bird ended, in 1912, the three Eaton sisters and their younger brother Joe began appearing in various plays and melodramas for the Poli stock company. They quickly gained reputations as professional, reliable, and versatile actors and were rarely out of work. A 1914 newspaper article described Mary Eaton as "the newest and littlest member of the company", adding that she had "admirable poise and grace."

In 1915, the three sisters appeared in a new production of The Blue Bird for Poli; Doris and Mary were given the starring roles of Mytyl and Tytyl. The siblings then were invited to reprise their roles for a New York and road tour of the play, produced by the Shubert Brothers. When the show closed, on the recommendation of the Shuberts, Mary began studying ballet in earnest with Theodore Kosloff.

=== Professional theatre ===
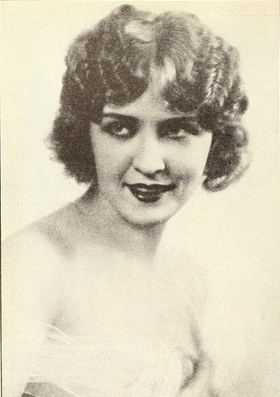
Eaton in 1923

Of all of the Eatons, Mary was perhaps the most famous. A talented dancer, she earned raves in a production of Intime in Washington, DC in 1917.

In 1916, she made her Broadway debut, dancing a ballet specialty in Follow Me. The next year, she performed in the Shubert Brothers' Over the Top with Fred and Adele Astaire. Throughout the 1920s, Eaton was a constant presence on Broadway, appearing in eight different productions.

She was featured in three editions of the Ziegfeld Follies, those of 1920, 1921, and 1922. Eaton's trademark dance routine, which she performed in the Follies, involved a complicated sequence of pirouettes around the stage en pointe. Broadway impresario Florenz Ziegfeld groomed Mary Eaton as the successor to his star attraction Marilyn Miller, but as historian Richard Barrios noted, "Beautiful, blonde, and a dancer, all like Miller, Eaton could not match her predecessor's charisma."

=== Film career ===
Eaton also had a brief film career, appearing in two important early sound movies that were filmed at the Paramount Pictures studios in Astoria, Queens. She was the ingenue opposite Oscar Shaw in The Cocoanuts (1929), the first film starring the Marx Brothers. Eaton might have gone on to play similar featured roles in early talkies, but Paramount decided to build a major feature film around her.

Glorifying the American Girl (1929) was to be a spectacular, all-talking extravaganza worthy of Ziegfeld (who receives screen credit), with musical pageants filmed in Technicolor. Paramount gave Eaton the starring role of an ambitious shopgirl who goes into show business and fights her way to the top, with little regard for her friends and colleagues. Eaton's singing and dancing routines, including her signature pirouette sequence, were featured, but they couldn't overcome her limited screen personality. Her speaking voice on film was a carefully affected, high-pitched twitter that enunciated dialogue carefully, likely a remnant of her stage training. Her actual speaking voice, without the affectation and in a lower, more realistic range, can be heard briefly in Glorifying the American Girl. The film was completed in June 1929, but Paramount executives considered it too weak for release. In hopes of bolstering the film, new footage of celebrities Eddie Cantor. Helen Morgan, and Rudy Vallée was shot. After a terrible preview, Paramount actually sneaked the film out in late 1929 to smaller towns, hoping to attract curious audiences with Broadway luster, and avoiding a New York premiere until early 1930. Critics panned it and audiences stayed away. The film's commercial failure abruptly halted Eaton's screen career.

== Personal life and death ==
By the early 1930's, the Eaton siblings, including Mary, found their careers waning. She made her final stage appearance in 1932. Beset by career woes and three difficult marriages, Eaton struggled with alcoholism. Although her siblings tried to intervene on numerous occasions, and she entered rehabilitation programs several times, Eaton was unable to overcome her alcohol addiction.

In 1929, Eaton married Millard Webb (her director of Glorifying the American Girl). At the time of her death she was married to actor Eddie Laughton.

Eaton died of liver disease on October 10, 1948 in Hollywood, California at the age of 47. She is interred at Forest Lawn Memorial Park in Glendale, California.

== Filmography ==
Year	Title	Role	Notes
1923	His Children's Children	Mercedes	
1924	Broadway After Dark	Herself, cameo appearance	
1929	A Ziegfeld Midnight Frolic	Herself	short
1929	The Cocoanuts	Polly Potter	
1929	Glorifying the American Girl	Gloria Hughes	
1942	We'll Smile Again	Continuity Girl	British; Uncredited, (final film role)

== See also ==
- Charles Eaton (American actor)
- Doris Eaton Travis
- Pearl Eaton
- The Seven Little Eatons
- Ziegfeld Follies
