= Gilbert Bundy =

American cartoonist and illustrator (1911–1955)

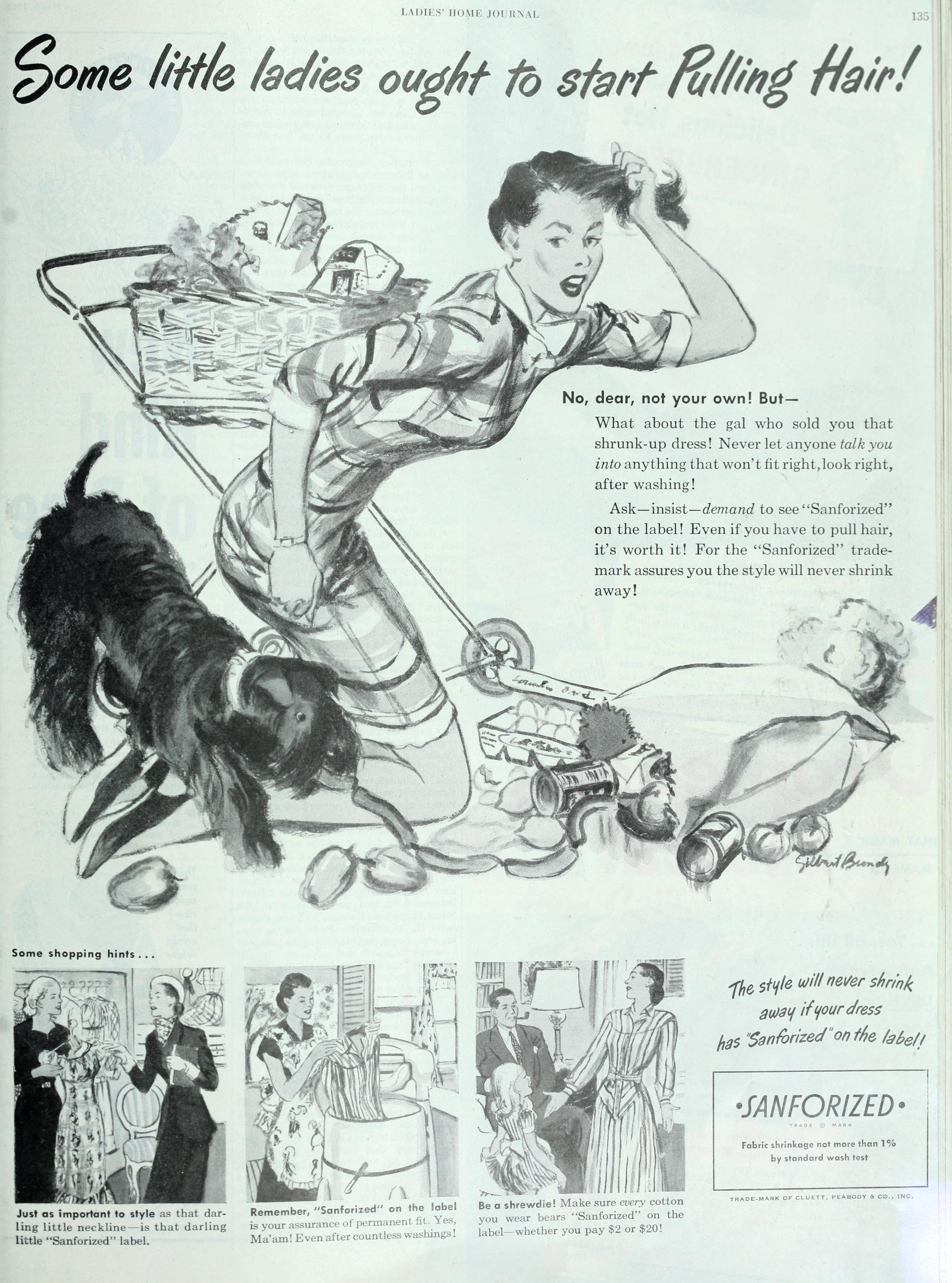
Illustration for Sanforized in the Ladies' Home Journal

Gilbert Bundy (1911 – November 21, 1955) was an American cartoonist and illustrator, particularly for Esquire, Life, Judge, and The Saturday Evening Post magazines. He killed himself on the 12th anniversary of a deeply traumatic experience as a war artist in the Battle of Tarawa.

== Early life and career ==
Bundy was born in Centralia, Illinois. His father was a scout for an oil company, so they lived in several oil boom towns across Oklahoma, with Bundy finishing high school in Winfield, Kansas.

Bundy's career started in Kansas City, working for an engraving company, and then he moved to New York City in 1929, to draw cartoons for Life and Judge magazines. Bundy's "stylish character studies helped establish Esquire magazine", which began publishing in 1933. According to Martin Plimmer, "Bundy's work was painstakingly researched, the result of numerous life studies, the final version being drawn from memory to add spontaneity."

== Second World War ==
In the Second World War, Bundy was a volunteer war artist in the South Pacific, working for Hearst newspapers and King Features Syndicate.

On November 21, 1943, Bundy was on a small landing craft during the amphibious landing in the Battle of Tarawa, when a Japanese shell exploded, leaving him trapped under four dead Marines. The wrecked craft drifted onto a coral reef that was within range of Japanese gunners on the island, so Bundy had to hide beneath the bodies for the remainder of a long day, as enemy bullets and shells hit the craft or landed nearby. Once night fell, he swam away through shark-infested waters, and as Hearst newspapers reported, "He was believed dead for three days. His reappearance startled his Marine mates."

Bundy was sent home to the US to recuperate, and returned to painting illustrations for "light-hearted romantic stories" for The Saturday Evening Post and other magazines, but he "remained haunted by his wartime experience."

== Death ==
On November 21, 1955, on the anniversary of his Tarawa trauma, he killed himself in his apartment in New York City's Hotel Le Marquis; "his body was found hanging by several neckties from a door hinge", and police determined it was a suicide.
