= Marion Harris =

American singer and actress

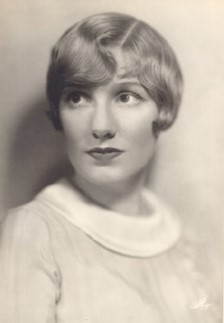
- Harris in 1924
- Born: Mary Ellen Harrison; March 25, 1897; Vanderburgh County, Indiana, U.S.
- Died: April 23, 1944 (aged 47); New York City, U.S.
- Occupations: Singer; actress
- Spouse: Robert Williams (m. 1921–1922)
- Musical career
- Genres: Jazz, blues, pop
- Years active: 1914-1934
- Labels: Victor, Columbia, Brunswick

Signature
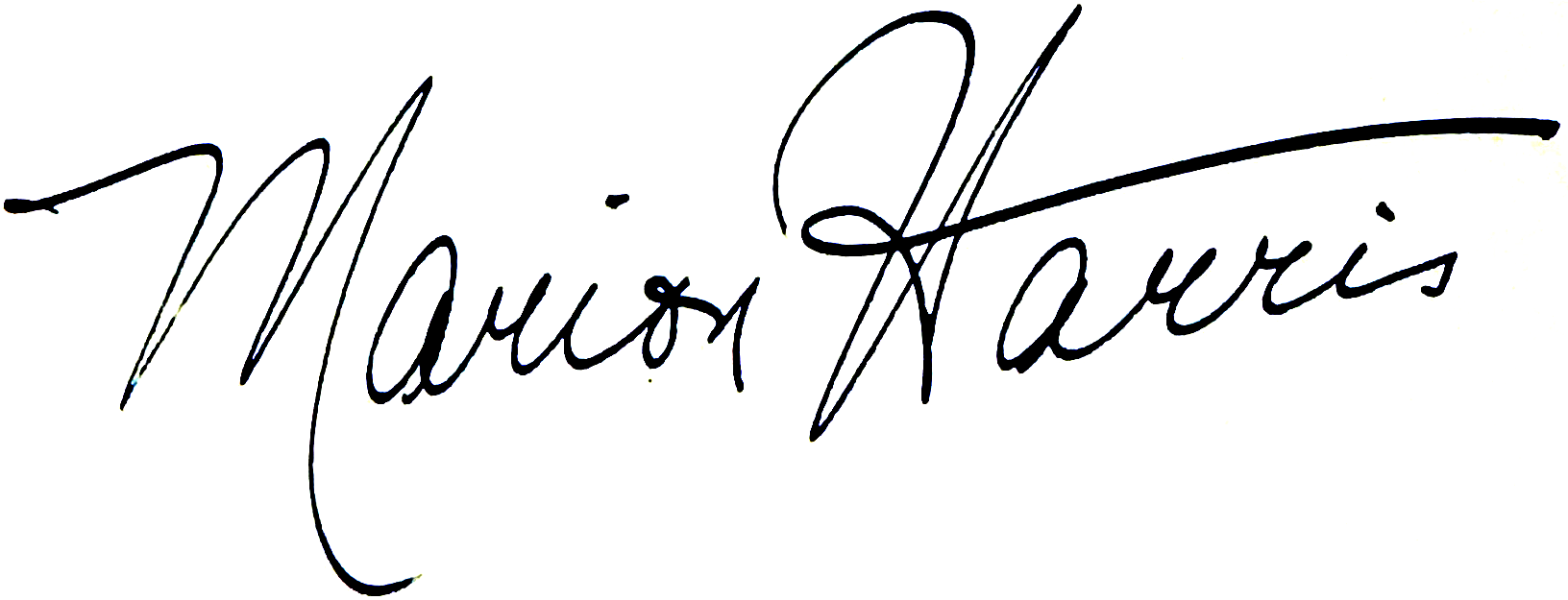

Marion Harris (born Mary Ellen Harrison; March 25, 1897 – April 23, 1944) was an American popular singer who was most successful in the late 1910s and the 1920s. She was the first widely-known white singer to sing jazz and blues songs.

== Early life ==
She was born Mary Ellen Harrison on March 25, 1897 in Vanderburgh County, Indiana. Her parents, James P. Harrison (who was in his family's stove manufacturing business) and Gertrude Kappler Sturtevant (a railroad stenographer) eloped to marry in Boonville, Indiana in 1893. Her parents' marriage was not successful in the long term. Her father's family business fell on hard times, and he committed suicide by train in Boonville in 1917, having been reduced to relying on charity. Presumably they were divorced prior to 1914, when her mother remarried engineer John M. Blades, with whom she remained until her death in 1921. Harris's paternal grandfather, Benjamin Franklin Harrison (no relation to the president of the United States, despite claims by her publicity machine) died in a hotel accident in 1907, the same fate that later claimed Harris herself.

Harris sang in vaudeville and movie theaters in Chicago around 1914. The dancer Vernon Castle introduced her to the theater community in New York City, where she debuted in the Irving Berlin revue Stop! Look! Listen! in 1915.

== Recordings ==
I Ain't Got Nobody
Marion Harris' 1921 recording of I Ain't Got Nobody

In 1916, she began recording for Victor Records, singing a variety of songs, such as "Everybody's Crazy 'bout the Doggone Blues, but I'm Happy", "After You've Gone", "A Good Man Is Hard to Find", "When I Hear That Jazz Band Play" and her biggest success, "I Ain't Got Nobody" (originally titled "I Ain't Got Nobody Much").

In 1920, after Victor prevented her from recording W.C. Handy's "St. Louis Blues", she joined Columbia, where she recorded the song. Sometimes billed as "The Queen of the Blues", she recorded blues and jazz songs throughout her career. Handy wrote, "she sang blues so well that people hearing her records sometimes thought that the singer was colored." Harris commented, "You usually do best what comes naturally, so I just naturally started singing Southern dialect songs and the modern blues songs."

She was briefly married to the actor Robert Williams. They married in 1921 and divorced the following year. Harris and Williams had one daughter, Mary Ellen, who later became a singer under the name Marion Harris Jr.

In 1922, she signed with Brunswick. She continued to appear in Broadway theaters throughout the 1920s. She regularly played the Palace Theatre, appeared in Florenz Ziegfeld's Midnight Frolic, and toured the country with vaudeville shows. After her divorce from a marriage that produced two children, she returned, in 1927, to New York theater, made more recordings with Victor, and appeared in an eight-minute Vitaphone short film, Marion Harris: Songbird of Jazz. After performing in a Hollywood movie, the early musical Devil-May-Care (1929), with Ramón Novarro, she temporarily withdrew from performance because of an undisclosed illness.

== Later career and death ==
Between 1931 and 1933, Harris performed on such NBC radio shows as The Ipana Troubadors and Rudy Vallee's The Fleischmann's Yeast Hour. She was billed by NBC as "The Little Girl with the Big Voice."

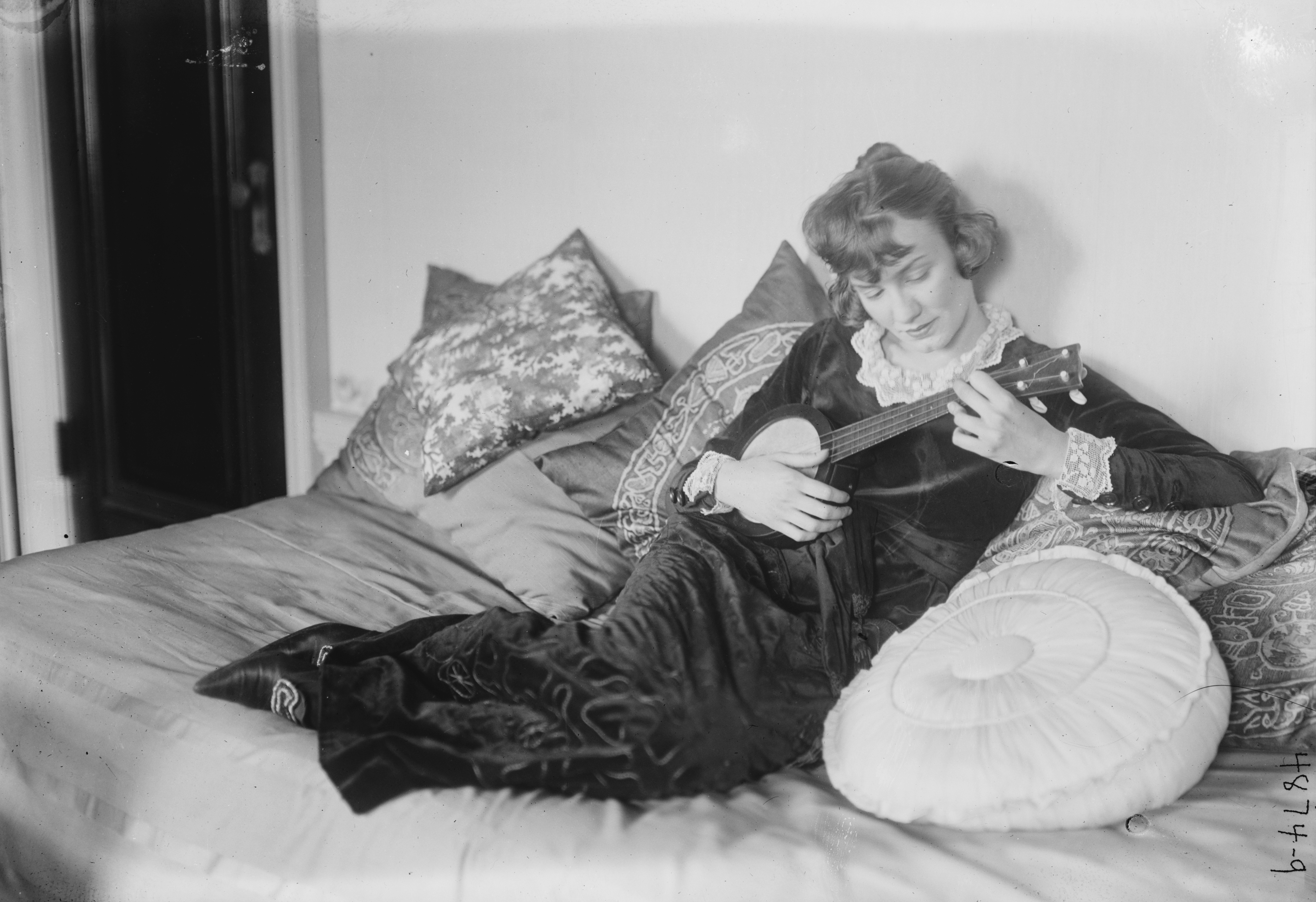
Harris with banjo uke

In early 1931, she performed in London, returning for long engagements at the Café de Paris (located in London). In London, she appeared in the musical Ever Green, which was broadcast on BBC radio. She also recorded in England in 1934 but retired soon afterward. In 1936, she married Leonard Urry, an English theatrical agent. Their house was destroyed in a German bombing attack in 1941, and in 1944 she travelled to New York to seek treatment for a neurological disorder, and was discharged two months later.

She died on April 23, 1944, at Le Marquise Hotel from a fire that started when she fell asleep while smoking in bed.

== Discography ==
- The Complete Victor Releases (Archeophone, 2000)
- Look for the Silver Lining (Living Era, 2006)

=== Hit singles ===
Year	Single	US Chart (Note: Whitburn's methodology for creating pre-1940s chart positions has been criticised, and those given here should not be taken as definitive.)
1916	"I'm Gonna Make Hay While the Sun Shines in Virginia"	8
1917	"I Ain't Got Nobody Much"	5
1917	"Paradise Blues"	7
1917	"They Go Wild, Simply Wild, Over Me"	2
1918	"Everybody's Crazy 'Bout the Doggone Blues (But I'm Happy)"	3
1918	"When Alexander Takes His Ragtime Band to France"	4
1918	"There's a Lump of Sugar Down in Dixie"	8
1919	"After You've Gone"	1
1919	"A Good Man Is Hard to Find"	2
1919	"Jazz Baby"	3
1919	"Take Me to the Land of Jazz"	5
1920	"Left All Alone Again Blues"	5
1920	"St. Louis Blues"	1
1920	"Oh! Judge (He Treats Me Mean)"	11
1920	"Sweet Mama (Papa's Gettin' Mad)"	4
1921	"I'm a Jazz Vampire"	8
1921	"Grieving for You"	7
1921	"Look for the Silver Lining"	1
1921	"I Ain't Got Nobody"	3
1921	"I'm Nobody's Baby"	3
1921	"Beale Street Blues"	5
1922	"Some Sunny Day"	3
1922	"Nobody Lied (When They Said That I Cried Over You)"	4
1922	"I'm Just Wild About Harry"	4
1922	"Sweet Indiana Home"	5
1922	"Blue (And Broken Hearted)"	7
1923	"Carolina in the Morning"	4
1923	"Aggravatin' Papa"	3
1923	"Rose of the Rio Grande"	3
1923	"Beside a Babbling Brook"	7
1923	"Who's Sorry Now?"	5
1923	"Dirty Hands! Dirty Face!"	6
1924	"It Had to Be You"	3
1924	"How Come You Do Me Like You Do?"	5
1924	"Jealous"	3
1924	"There'll Be Some Changes Made"	7
1925	"Somebody Loves Me"	7
1925	"Tea for Two"	1
1925	"I'll See You in My Dreams"	4
1925	"When You and I Were Seventeen"	11
1928	"The Man I Love"	4
1928	"Did You Mean It?"	14
1930	"Nobody's Using It Now"	20
