= Doris Eaton Travis =

American actress (1904–2010)

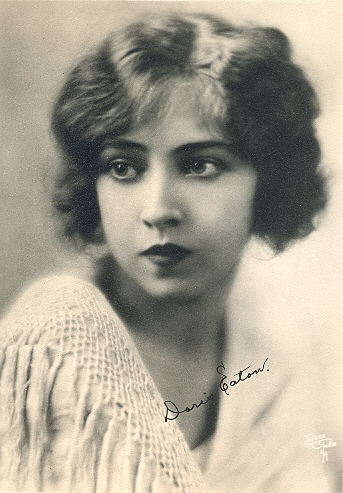
- Doris Eaton Travis in 1922
- Born: Doris Eaton; March 14, 1904; Norfolk, Virginia, U.S.
- Died: May 11, 2010 (aged 106); Commerce, Michigan, U.S.
- Resting place: Guardian Angel Cemetery, Rochester, Michigan
- Other names: Doris Levant; Lucille Levant
- Education: University of Oklahoma
- Occupations: Actress; dancer; dancer instructor; dance school owner and manager; writer; rancher
- Years active: 1909–2010 (101 years)
- Spouses: Joe Gorham (m. 1923; died 1923) Paul Travis (m. 1949; died 2000)
- Relatives: Mary Eaton (sister); Pearl Eaton (sister); Charles Eaton (brother)

Doris Eaton Travis (March 14, 1904 – May 11, 2010) was an American dancer, stage and film actress, dance instructor, owner and manager, writer, and rancher, who was the last surviving Ziegfeld Girl, a troupe of acclaimed chorus girls who performed as members in the Broadway theatrical revues of the Ziegfeld Follies.

She began performing onstage as a young child, and along with her siblings, she was one of The Seven Little Eatons, an extended family of show-business performers. She made her Broadway debut in stage production at age 13, and a year later she was cast as a member of the famed Ziegfeld Follies—the youngest ever cast in the show. She continued to perform in stage productions and silent films in the 1920s and early 1930s.

When her career in stage and screen declined, Travis started a second career as a dance instructor for the Arthur Murray Studios and was a local television personality in Detroit. Her association with Arthur Murray lasted for three decades, during which time she rose through the ranks to own and manage a chain of nearly twenty schools. After retiring from her career with Arthur Murray, she managed a horse ranch with her husband and returned to school, eventually earning several degrees.

Travis was featured in several books and documentaries about the Ziegfeld Follies years, and her other stage endeavours. Travis also returned to the stage as a featured performer in benefit performances. She died at the age of 106 in 2010, a month after her last performance.

== Early life ==
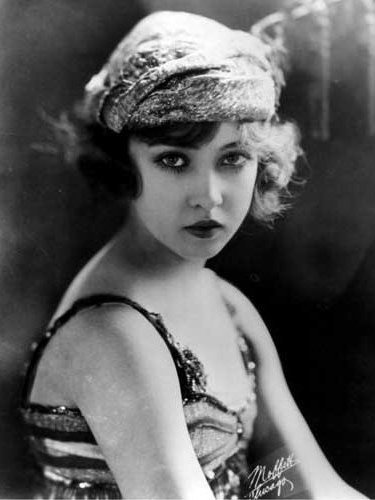
Doris Eaton Travis in her youth

She was one of seven children born to Mary (née Saunders) and Charles H. Eaton in Norfolk, Virginia. She was raised as a Christian Scientist and remained a practitioner for the rest of her life. At the age of four, Travis began attending dance lessons in Washington, D.C., along with her sisters Mary and Pearl Eaton. In 1911, all three sisters were hired for a production of Maurice Maeterlinck's fantasy play The Blue Bird at the Belasco Theatre in Washington, D.C. While Travis had a minor role in the show, as a sleeping child in the "Palace of Night" scene, it marked the beginning of her career in professional theatre.

== Career ==
=== Theatre ===
After The Blue Bird, in 1912, the three Eaton sisters and their younger brother Joe began appearing in plays and melodramas for the Poli Stock Company. They quickly gained reputations as professional, reliable, and versatile actors, and were rarely out of work.

In 1915, all three sisters appeared in a new production of The Blue Bird for Poli. Doris and Mary were given the starring roles of Mytyl and Tyltyl. The siblings were subsequently invited to reprise their roles for a New York and road tour of the play, produced by the Shubert Brothers. When the show closed, Doris and her brother Charles, who had followed his four siblings into show business, resumed their work with Poli and appeared together in their first Broadway show, Mother Carey's Chickens at the Cort Theatre. The entire Eaton family relocated to New York City, where the children pursued their careers in stage projects.

=== Ziegfeld Follies ===
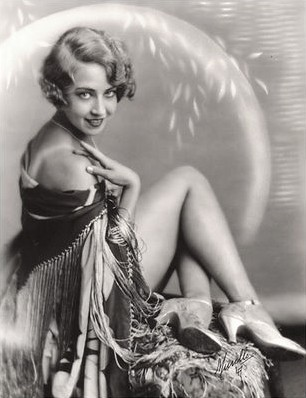
Eaton, as a member of The Ziegfeld Follies revue

By 1918, Pearl Eaton had become a dancer and assistant to the director with the Ziegfeld Follies. The Follies were a series of elaborate musical revues on Broadway in New York City from 1907 to 1931. Inspired by the Folies Bergère of Paris, the Follies were conceived and produced by Florenz Ziegfeld. When Travis accompanied Pearl to a rehearsal, dance supervisor Ned Wayburn spotted her and hired her for a role in the summer touring company of the 1918 Follies.

The day she finished the eighth grade, Travis began rehearsals to become a Ziegfeld Girl in the Follies. To circumvent child labour laws and the attention of the Gerry Society, she performed under the stage names "Doris Levant" (her young niece's name) and "Lucille Levant". As soon as she turned sixteen, she began using her real name again. Wayburn was one of only a few people who were aware of her true age, and arranged for her mother to accompany her on the Follies tour as a paid member of the company.

Travis was associated with Ziegfeld for several years, appearing in the 1918, 1919, and 1920 editions of the Ziegfeld Follies and the 1919 Midnight Frolics. She was the understudy to star Marilyn Miller. Travis was not the only member of the Eaton family to prosper in the show: by 1922, siblings Mary, Pearl, Doris, Joe, and ten-year-old Charles had all performed in one edition of the Follies or another. Her last appearance with the Follies was in the 1920 edition.

=== Film ===
Travis made her motion picture debut at the age of 17 in the 1921 romantic drama At the Stage Door, opposite silent film star Billie Dove. Her career flourished in the 1920s and early 1930s. She appeared in a number of additional silent films, including Tell Your Children with director Donald Crisp in England and Egypt. She performed in five different Broadway shows. She danced in the Hollywood Music Box Revue and the Gorham Follies in Los Angeles and the Hollywood Club in New York.

While in the Hollywood Music Box Revue, Travis debuted two important songs, both composed by Nacio Herb Brown: "Singin' in the Rain" and "The Doll Dance". Travis was the lyricist for The Doll Dance, but did not receive due credit. In 1929, she appeared in The Very Idea, which has been shown on cable. At the age of 18, she married Joe Gorham, producer of the Gorham Follies. The union lasted for six months, ending when Gorham died of a heart attack.

=== Dance instructor and ranching ===
In 1935, Travis performed in her final Broadway show, Merrily We Roll Along, at the Music Box Theatre. Her career, along with those of her siblings, declined in the 1930s. She returned to work in stock theatrical productions on Long Island and had a brief, unsuccessful foray into vaudeville with her brother Charles.

In 1936, she was hired by the Arthur Murray Dance Studios in New York as a tap dance instructor. She remained with the Arthur Murray company for thirty-two years, advancing from teaching to owning her own school. She eventually established and owned eighteen Arthur Murray studios across Michigan. She also authored a column of dance advice and commentary for the Detroit News entitled "On Your Toes" and hosted a local television program for seven years.

One of her pupils, inventor and engineer Paul Travis, became her husband after an 11-year courtship. They wed on March 19, 1949. Their marriage lasted over fifty years, until Paul's death in 2000. They had no children. After retiring from the dance studio business in 1968, Travis and her husband moved to Norman, Oklahoma, and established a ranch. The initial 220-acre (89 ha) plot grew to 880 acres (356 ha), and many of the Quarter Horses bred and raised on the ranch had success in racing. The ranch operated largely as a boarding facility, managed by Travis until 2008.

== Later years ==
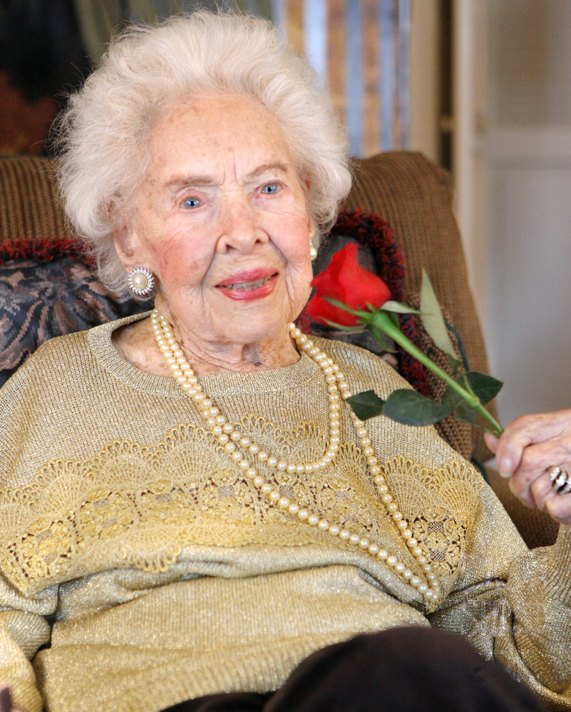
Doris Eaton Travis in April 2010, a month before her death, aged 106

In 1992, aged 88, Travis graduated cum laude and Phi Beta Kappa from the University of Oklahoma. She was awarded an honorary doctorate from Oakland University in 2004 at the age of 100.

In 1997, she and four former Ziegfeld Girls reunited for the reopening of the New Amsterdam Theatre. She later recalled that she was the only one still able to dance. In 1998, Travis returned to Broadway and the New Amsterdam Theatre, the same venue where she had first appeared in 1918, 80 years earlier, to participate in the Easter Bonnet Competition, a benefit for Broadway Cares/Equity Fights AIDS. She became the show's "lucky charm" and an audience favourite, and continued to appear in the production almost every year, often presenting renditions of her old dances to standing ovations from the audience.

In 1999, she made her first film appearance in 70 years with a small role in Man on the Moon with Jim Carrey. In 2001, she became the last surviving Ziegfeld Girl, following the death of Nona Otero Friedman (April 2, 1908 – August 3, 2001). She appeared in several documentaries and interviews about the Ziegfeld Follies and her siblings and colleagues.

In 2003, she published an autobiography and family history, entitled The Days We Danced, turning 100 in 2004. In 2006, she was the subject of a photo-collage biography by Pulitzer Prize nominee Lauren Redniss entitled Century Girl: 100 Years in the Life of Doris Eaton Travis, Last Living Star of the Ziegfeld Follies.

In January 2008, Travis served as The Grand Marshal of the opening parade for the Art Deco Weekend festival in Miami Beach. Her last public appearance dancing was the opening of the 2010 Easter Bonnet show on April 27, 2010, with her last public appearance being an interview with author Stuart Lutz at a Barnes & Noble bookstore in Manhattan two days later.

== Death ==
On May 11, 2010, Travis died of an aneurysm in Commerce, Michigan, at the age of 106. On May 12, the lights of Broadway were dimmed in her honour. She is interred in the Guardian Angel Cemetery in Rochester, Michigan.

== Filmography ==
| Year | Title | Role | Notes |
|---|---|---|---|
| 1921 | At the Stage Door | Betty | |
| 1922 | The Broadway Peacock | Rose Ingraham | |
| 1922 | Tell Your Children | Rosny Edwards | |
| 1922 | The Call of the East | Mrs. Burleigh | |
| 1923 | High Kickers | | |
| 1923 | Fashion Follies | Doris - the Leading Dancer | |
| 1928 | Taking the Count | Second daughter | |
| 1929 | Street Girl | Singer at Club Joyzelle | |
| 1929 | The Very Idea | Edith Goodhue | |
| 1999 | Man on the Moon | Eleanor Gould | |
