= Charles Twelvetrees =

American artist and illustrator

- Born: 29 July 1872; Utica, New York, U.S.
- Died: 6 April 1948 (aged 75); New York City, U.S.
- Occupations: Artist; illustrator
- Spouses: Anna Feder (m. 1894; died 1902) Rose Clark (m. 1903; died 1946)

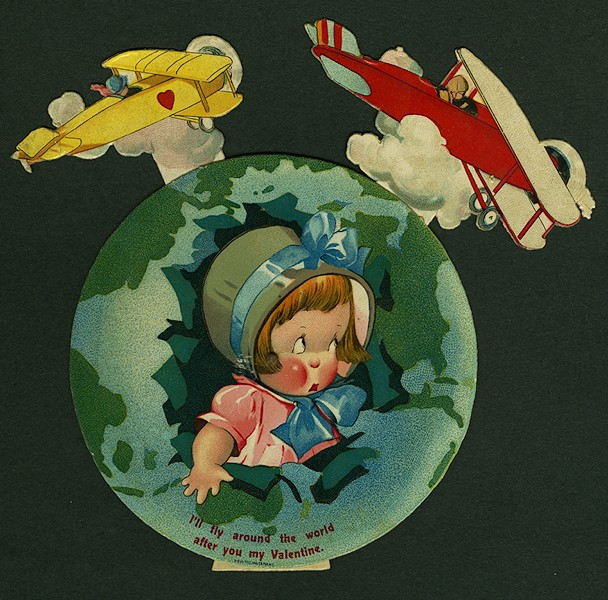
Valentine's card c. 1920 by Twelvetrees

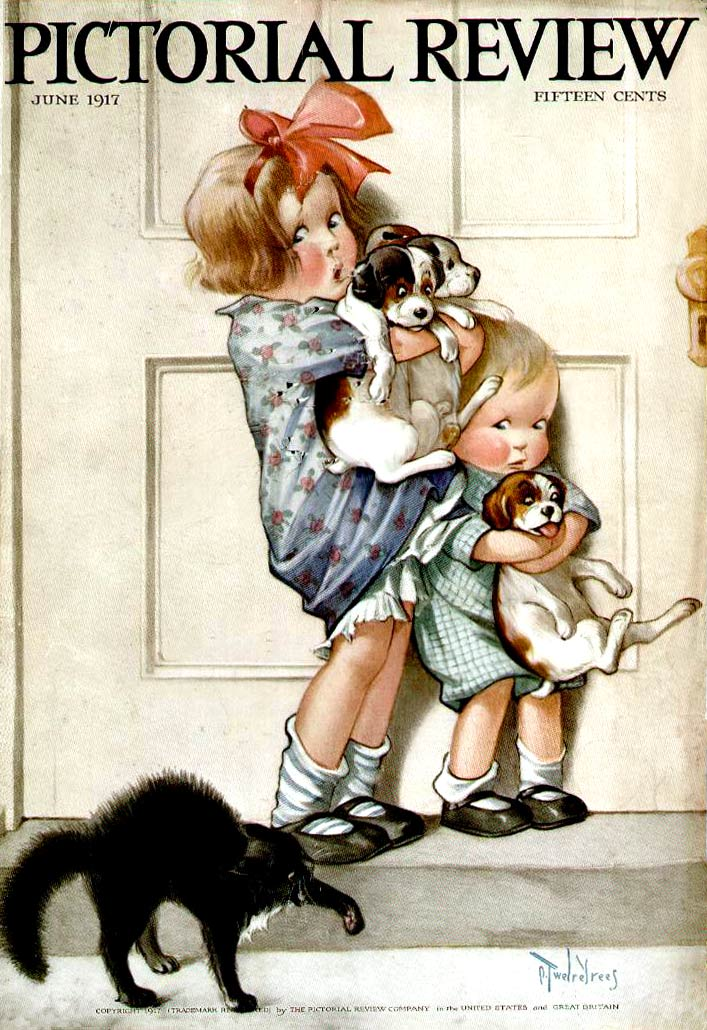
Pictorial Review, 1917, cover by Twelvetrees

Charles Henry Twelvetrees (29 July 1872 – 6 April 1948) was an American artist and illustrator, particularly of postcards, and best known for his chubby-faced cherubic children.

Charles Henry Twelvetrees was born on 29 July 1872, in Utica, New York, the son of Henry Twelvetrees and Eliza Marguerite Turner. He married Anna Feder on 13 February 1894, in Manhattan, New York City. She died in 1902 after drinking a liquid containing bichloride of mercury following a row with her husband over his affair. He married Rose Clark in October 1903, who died on 14 August 1946.

Charles and Rose had one son, Clark Charles Twelvetrees, who was married to the actress Helen Twelvetrees (née Jurgens) from 1927 to 1930.

Twelvetrees died on 6 April 1948 in the bathtub of his room in the Hotel Le Marquis at 12 East 31st Street, Manhattan due to natural causes.

His work is in the permanent collection of the Wellcome Collection, London.
