= Harper Twelvetrees =

British industrialist and philanthropist

- Born: 17 December 1823; Biggleswade
- Died: 30 November 1881 (aged 57); Clapton
- Known for: Laundry cleansing products and washing machines Philanthropy; Anti-slavery campaign
- Spouse(s): Mary Hubbard (1848); Isabella Noble (1851)
- Children: William Harper, 1848; Walter Noble, 1852; Florence Rose, 1858; Edwin Harper, 1863; Herbert, 1866

Harper Twelvetrees (1823–1881) was an industrialist, philanthropist and anti-slavery campaigner.

== Biography ==
He was born on 17 December 1823 in Biggleswade, the third of ten children of William, carpenter and builder, and Anna (née Harris). He was named after his paternal grandmother, Mary Harper.

=== Business and philanthropy ===
By 1841, age 17, he was an apprentice in nearby Potton. Twelvetrees was learning about the printing and book-selling trade and set up his own business in Dunstable. In 1848 he moved it to Holborn, where he also sold laundry materials made by other manufacturers. His apprenticeship had introduced him to chemistry, which was of great interest.

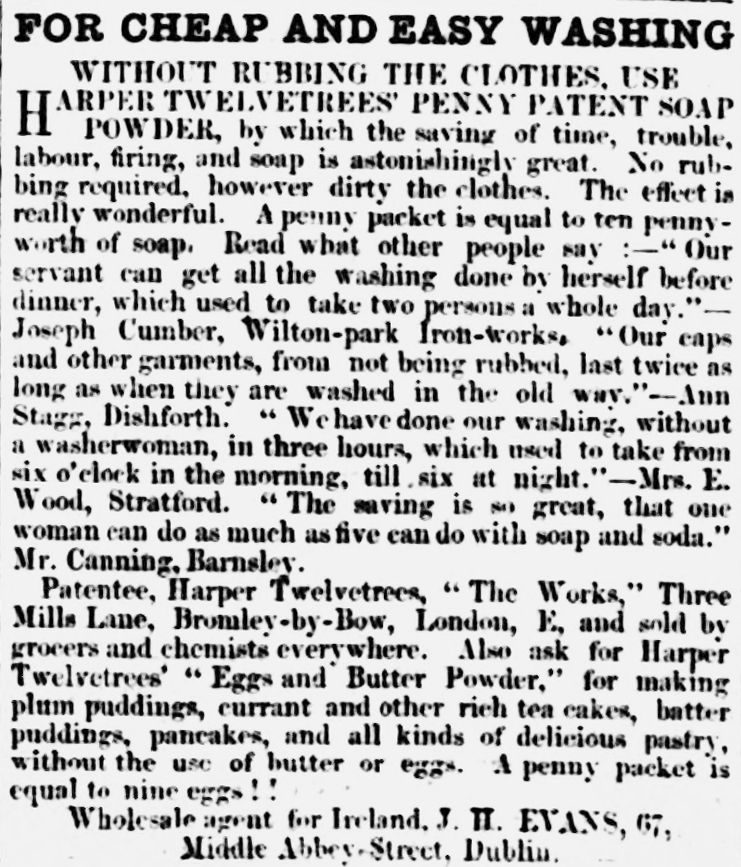
Advertisement for Penny Patent Soap Powder

In 1849 he published The Science of Washing, an eight-page booklet which gave his formula for making a paste from soap, soda and quicklime. This, he claimed, would enable the household laundry to be done every week, quickly and at minimal cost, rather than on 'the old system of once a month'.

In 1859 Twelvetrees moved his manufactory to a site on the west side of the Lea at Bromley-by-Bow, just over the river from the Three Mills distillery. He wasted no time before advertising “in newspapers and magazines the length and breadth of the British Isles and throughout the Empire”. His name even appeared in an Australian sea shanty On board of the Kangaroo, with the immortal lines:

Farewell to dreams of married life! To soap, to suds, and blue,
To “Glenfield starch”, and “Harper Twelvetrees’ washing powder” too

— Harry Clifton (1865)

Business in the factory he had named Imperial Works grew steadily and, by 1865, the product range included harness blacking, writing and other inks, washing powder, soap and other laundry items and, curiously, baking powder, egg and custard powders.

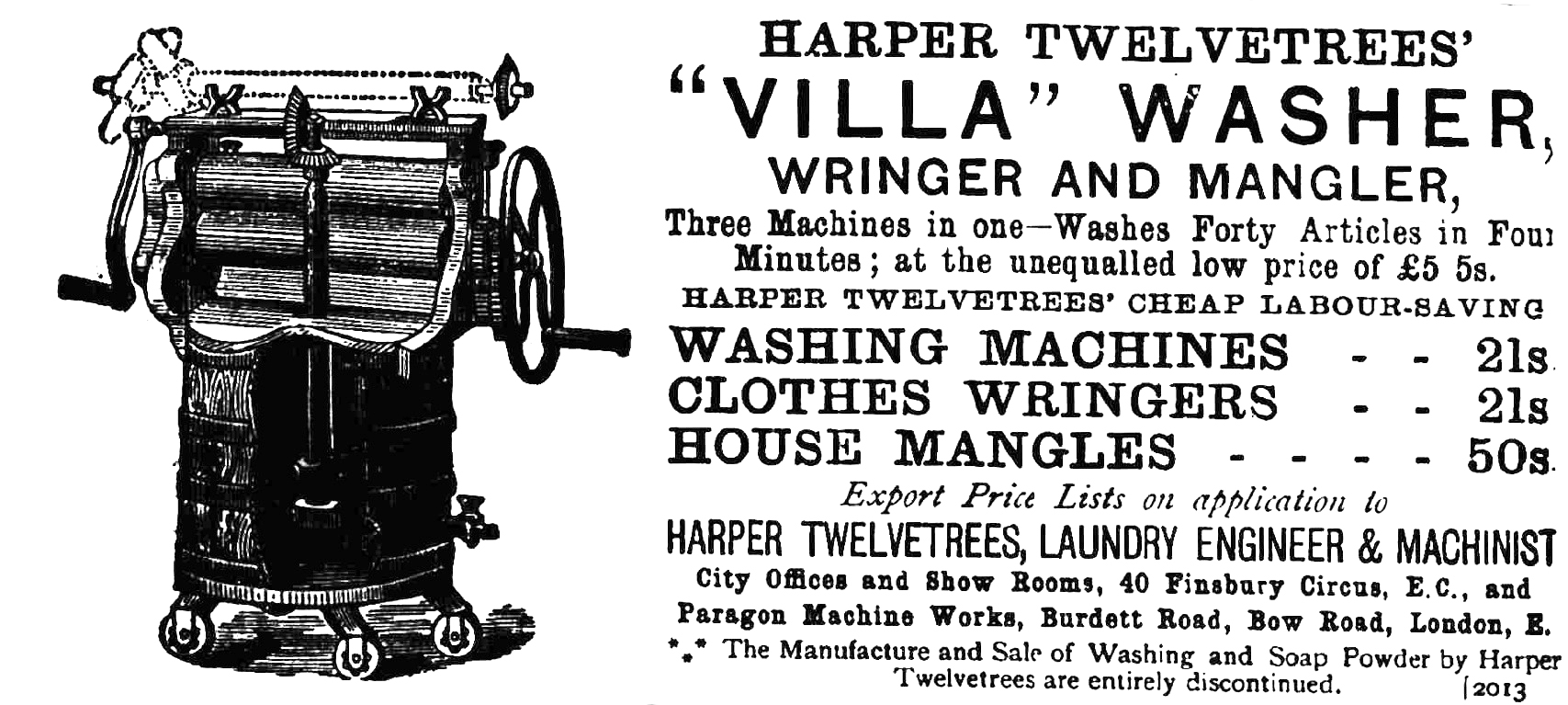
Harper Twelvetrees' Washer, Wringer and Mangler

Twelvetrees then ventured into mechanical devices, styling himself “Laundry Engineer and Machinist”. In the 1870s-90s his most famous machine was the “Villa” which Mrs Beeton praised in her Book of Household Management as being "excellent for family use...very easy to work without being cumbersome... strong and very durable".

At its peak, the works employed some 400 people. Twelvetrees took a close interest in the welfare of his employees. Cottages were built for employees and their families, and the works operated a system of sickness insurance, as well as a clothing club. A sports club, concerts and lectures were also provided. His philanthropy was lauded by the Stratford Times in 1861, and Julia Lafferty notes that Twelvetrees “deserves to be recorded alongside Leverhulme, Rowntree and Cadbury as a man of humanity and principle, whose efforts to improve working conditions made a huge impact upon the lives of the ordinary people of east London”.

At one stage Twelvetrees was bankrupt, but he returned to new premises at the Cordova Works in Grove Road, Bow. His return to business was recognised by a soiree held for him by friends and colleagues at Radley’s Hotel, Blackfriars on 5 November 1869. He was celebrated as a “Merchant and Philanthropist, and [for] his laborious efforts on behalf of the moral, social, intellectual and religious welfare of the working classes”.

=== Anti-slavery campaigner ===
Harper Twelvetrees was strongly averse to slavery, and was particularly involved in the case of John Anderson, an African-American who escaped to Canada to avoid capture by bounty hunters, but who killed a farmer, Seneca Diggs, while on the run. The Canadian courts were intent on extraditing Anderson and the case caused much controversy on both sides of the Atlantic. After Anderson had arrived in London in 1861, Twelvetrees organised a nationwide speaking tour for Anderson to raise funds for his cause, which was supported by Lord Shaftesbury. He set up and chaired the John Anderson Committee and wrote a book about the ex-slave. He styled himself “Harper Twelvetrees, MA” but there is no evidence that he ever went to university.

The case ended successfully. At the end of his speaking tour, Anderson spent a year in Corby furthering his education, with financial support from Twelvetrees. A grant of land and free passage to the Republic of Liberia was obtained for him, to which he sailed in December 1862.

=== The man and his family ===
Harper Twelvetrees married Mary Hubbard in 1848. They had one child, William Harper, born that year. Mary died in 1849.

Twelvetrees' second marriage was to Isabella Noble in Boston in 1851. Isabella (born 1829) was a daughter John Noble of Boston, a printer, stationer, bookseller and reporter. He was a leader of the reform movement in the town, serving as mayor in 1847 and 1851. Harper and Isabella had four children, three sons and a daughter.

He died at home, 223 Evering Road, Clapton, on 30 November 1881. Isabella died on 21 June 1897; probate was handled by their youngest child, Herbert, an accountant.

Julia Lafferty summarises Twelvetrees’ life thus: “Having set up his business with a combination of philanthropy and humanity, he was able to change radically the social and economic conditions in an impoverished part of east London, and through his campaigning against the pernicious system of slavery that operated in the southern states of America, played a key role in influencing British public opinion during the American Civil War."
