= William Harper Twelvetrees =

English geologist in Tasmania

William Harper Twelvetrees (1848 – 7 November 1919) was an English geologist who was important for the characterisation of the geology of Tasmania.

Twelvetrees was born in Bedfordshire, England, in 1848, to industrialist Harper Twelvetrees and Mary Hubbard. He was educated in London and in Germany.

In 1890 he moved to Tasmania, and in August 1899 he became the government's geologist and chief inspector of mines.

He was a joint author of a number of articles and books about western Tasmanian geology, including with William Frederick Petterd.

He died on 7 November 1919. He was married twice: to Mary Adelaide Austin, who died on 11 July 1899, and then to Sarah Elvin Genders, who survived him.

His writing in the bulletins of the Tasmanian geological survey and other publications, occurred at a very busy time in the West Coast, Tasmania region's mining history, which has not been repeated since.

== Example of reports ==
- Twelvetrees, W.H. (1903), The Progress of the Mineral Industry of Tasmania for the Quarter Ending 31 December 1902.
- Twelvetrees, W.H. (1905), The Progress of the Mineral Industry of Tasmania for the Quarter Ending 31 December 1904.

== Notes ==
Awards
| Preceded by Walter Roth | Clarke Medal; 1912 | Succeeded by Arthur Smith Woodward |
