= Pearl Eaton =

American actress

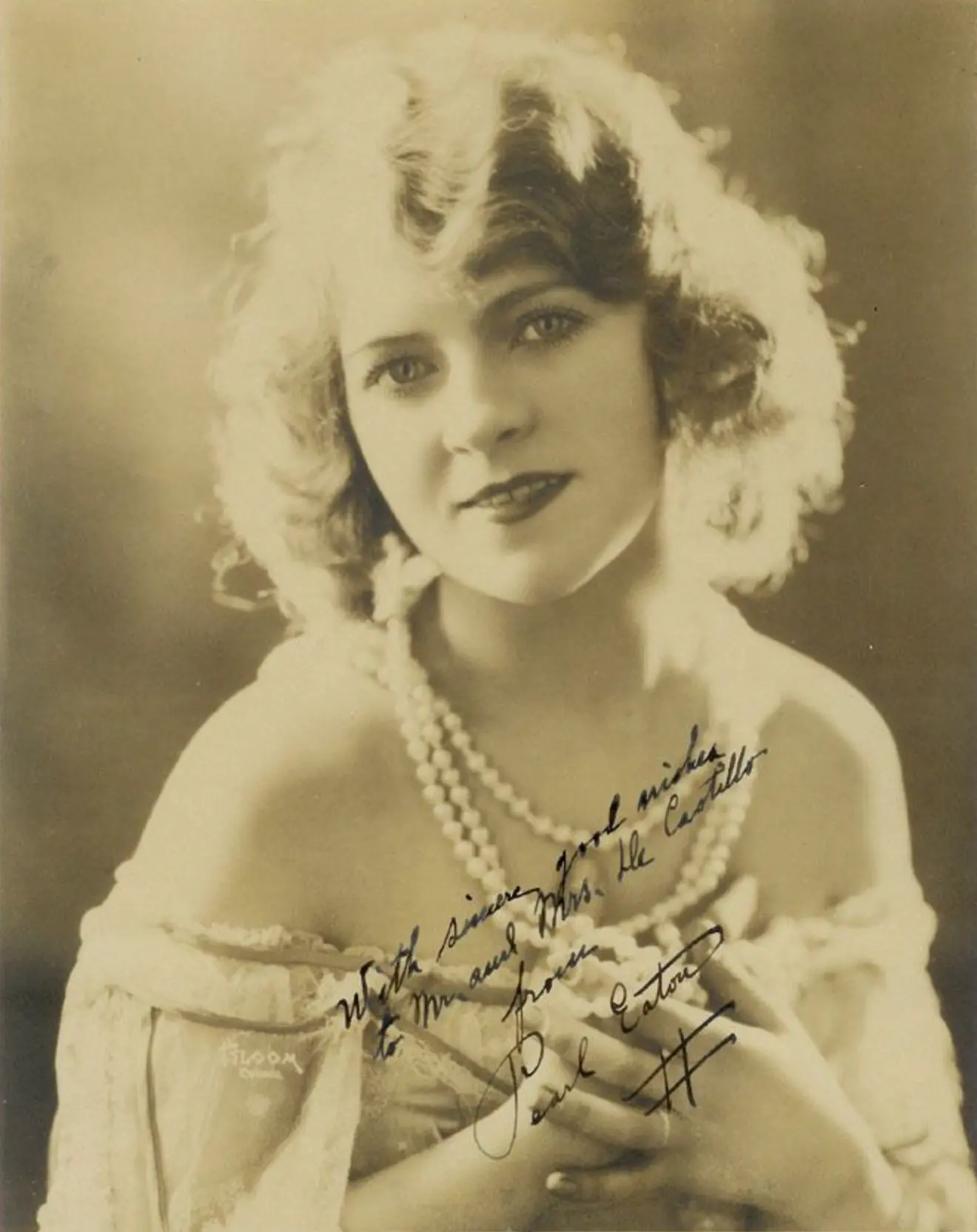
- Eaton around 1920
- Born: August 1, 1898; Washington, D.C, U.S.
- Died: September 10, 1958 (aged 60); Manhattan Beach, California, U.S.
- Occupations: Film Actress; Broadway performer; Choreographer Dance Supervisor
- Years active: 1911-1958
- Spouse(s): Harry Levant (1917 - 1928, divorce); Dick Enderley

Pearl Eaton Levant (August 1, 1898 – September 10, 1958) was an American Broadway performer, actress, choreographer, and dance supervisor of the 1910s and 1920s.

== Early life and career ==
Eaton was born in Washington, D.C., and was the daughter of Charles Henry Eaton. She began attending dance lessons in Washington D.C., along with her sisters Doris and Mary, at a young age. In 1911, all three sisters were hired for a production of Maurice Maeterlinck's fantasy play The Blue Bird at the Shubert Belasco Theatre in Washington. While Eaton had a minor role in the show, it served as her introduction to the world of professional theatre.

After The Blue Bird, in 1912, the three Eaton sisters and their younger brother Joe began appearing in various plays and melodramas for the Poli stock company. They quickly gained reputations as professional, reliable, and versatile actors, and were rarely out of work. In 1915, all three sisters appeared in a new production of The Blue Bird for Poli; Doris and Mary were given the starring roles of Mytyl and Tytyl. The siblings were subsequently invited to reprise their roles for a New York and road tour of the play, produced by the Shubert Brothers.

Although Pearl had a minor role in The Blue Bird, her dancing impressed the Shuberts, who offered her a place in the chorus of Al Jolson's latest show at the Winter Garden Theatre, Robinson Crusoe, Jr. It marked the beginning of her career as an adult musical theatre performer.

== Success onstage and onscreen ==
Following her performance in Robinson Crusoe, Jr., Eaton appeared in The Passing Show. When the production went on tour, Eaton remained with the cast. While on the road, she fell in love with one of the company musicians, violinist Harry Levant. The two were married in 1917; the following year, Eaton gave birth to a daughter, Doris. However, shortly after giving birth, she regained her dancing form and was back at the Winter Garden, appearing as a specialty dancer in Sinbad. Levant and Eaton were divorced in November 1928.

In the spring of 1918, Eaton was hired as a chorus dancer for the latest edition of the Ziegfeld Follies. She would remain with Ziegfeld for five years, appearing in the Follies in 1918, 1922, and 1923 and the Midnight Frolics of 1919, 1920, and 1921. While she never was made a principal dancer with the Follies, from 1918 onwards, she also worked as an assistant to choreographer Ned Wayburn.

In April 1923 Eaton starred in Plunder at Poli's Majestic Theater in New York City. On one occasion she filled in for Marilyn Miller in a Ziegfeld chorus when the star had the mumps. Eaton was reputed to have the most beautiful legs in America. It was reported that each time Ziegfeld encountered Eaton he asked her, "How are the legs?".

After her final appearance with the Follies, in the 1923 road company, Eaton became associated with producer Charles Dillingham, becoming the only female musical comedy producer in New York at that time. She worked on Dillngham's productions for several years, both as a performer and a dance director. During this period she was a popular and respected presence on Broadway, and was even honored with a caricature on the walls at the theatrical restaurant Sardi's. Her final Broadway show was She's My Baby at the Globe Theatre in 1928.

In the late 1920s Eaton moved to Los Angeles and worked as a dance director and choreographer for RKO Studios, where her first film was Street Girl (1929). She created dances for such films as Hit the Deck with Jack Oakie, and RKO's largest hit of the decade, the Ziegfeld musical extravaganza, Rio Rita.

She was selected by Hungarian artist Erno Bakos for a portrait of the most typical American blonde, in December 1928. Bakos studied stage and screen beauties and went to both Vassar and Smith College in his search for an ideal girl. He believed Eaton possessed the perfect combination of beauty, intelligence, personality, charm, and spirit.

== 1930s and beyond ==
Pearl, along with the rest of her family, found her career in sharp decline during the Great Depression. In spite of her well-respected work at RKO, she was let go by the studio in 1930. She continued performing in motion pictures throughout the 30s, albeit in small roles. In July 1931, she began teaching at the Ernest E. Ryan School of Dancing.

Eaton also dabbled in various other careers, opening a dance studio, writing songs and stories, training to be a realtor, and working for the Los Angeles County Census Bureau. As with several of her siblings, she also battled alcoholism and dependence on prescription drugs. After the death of her second husband, oil company executive Richard Curtis “Dick” Enderly, she became reclusive and rarely left her home.

Pearl Eaton was found dead, at the age of 60, in her Manhattan Beach apartment on September 10, 1958. While the police investigation ruled that the death was a homicide, the case was never solved.

== See also ==
- List of unsolved murders (1900–1979)
- The Seven Little Eatons
- Wilshire Park, Los Angeles, California

== Books ==
- Bridgeport Telegram, Amusements, April 6, 1923, Page 40.
- The Helena Independent, Follies Girls Join Talkies, Giving Broadway the Blues, March 28, 1930, Page 8.
- San Mateo Times, Blondes Real Beauties, February 26, 1929, Page 1.
- Travis, Doris Eaton. The Days We Danced, Marquand Books, 2003, ISBN 0-8061-9950-4
