= Helen Twelvetrees =

American actress (1908–1958)

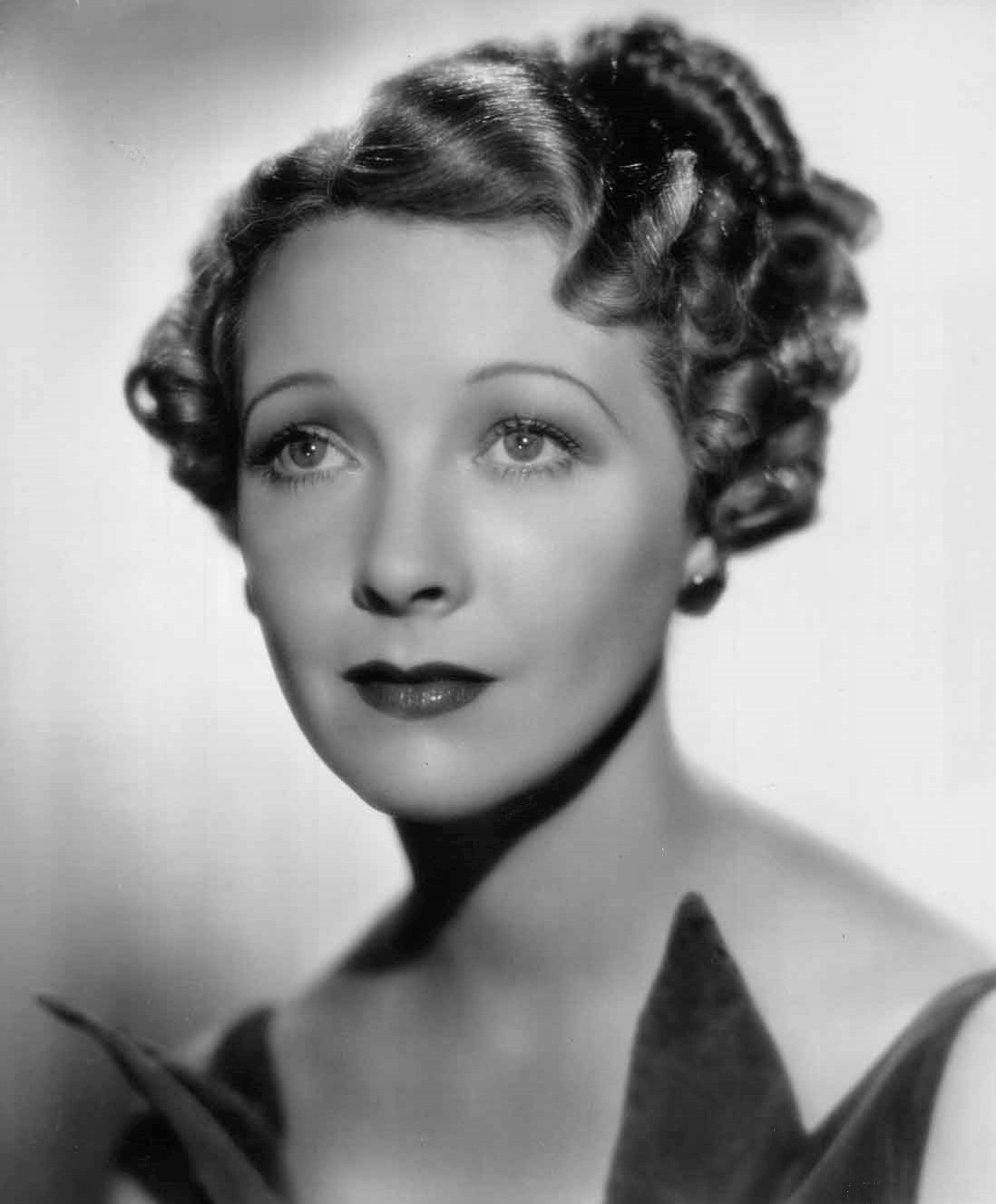
- Studio portrait, 1933
- Born: Helen Marie Jurgens; December 25, 1908; Brooklyn, New York, U.S.
- Died: February 13, 1958 (aged 49); Middletown, Pennsylvania, U.S.
- Resting place: Middletown Cemetery
- Education: Public School #119; Brooklyn Heights Seminary
- Alma mater: American Academy of Dramatic Arts
- Occupation: Actress
- Years active: 1927–1951
- Spouses: Clark Twelvetrees (m. 1927; div. 1931) Frank “Jack” Woody (m. 1931; div. 1936) Conrad Payne (m. 1947–1958)
- Children: 1
- Relatives: Charles Twelvetrees (father-in-law)

Helen Marie Twelvetrees (née Jurgens; December 25, 1908 – February 13, 1958) was an American actress. She starred in Hollywood films in the sound film era from 1929 to 1939. Many of her roles were of "suffering women,” which reflected her tumultuous personal life. She has a star on the Hollywood Walk of Fame located at 6263 Hollywood Blvd.

== Early life ==
Helen Marie Jurgens was born in Brooklyn, where she attended Public School 119. Her family moved to Flatbush, where her younger brother was born. In the winter of 1919, the family's apartment caught fire and her brother perished.

She attended Brooklyn Heights Seminary and then the Art Students League of New York, where she studied for a year before enrolling at the American Academy of Dramatic Arts. While attending AADA, she met actor Clark Twelvetrees, whom she married at age 19 in 1927. She adopted her husband's surname and used it as her professional name.

== Career ==
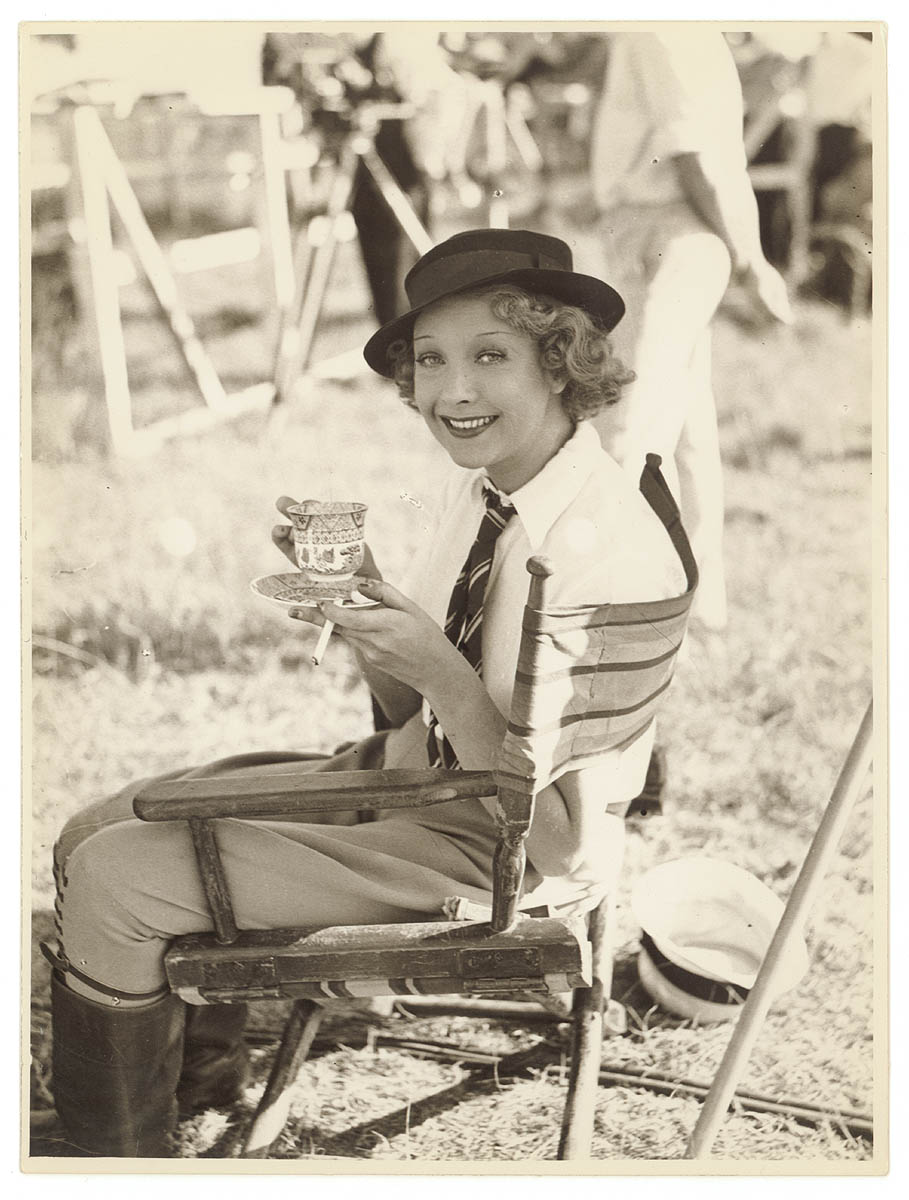
Twelvetrees filming Thoroughbred in 1936

With some stage experience, Twelvetrees went to Hollywood with a number of other actors to replace the silent stars who could not or would not make the transition to talkies. Her first job was with Fox Film Corporation, and she appeared in The Ghost Talks (1929). After three films with Fox, she was released from her contract. However, she was signed by Pathé shortly thereafter, and along with Constance Bennett and Ann Harding, Twelvetrees starred in several lachrymose dramas, not all of which were critically acclaimed.

When Pathé was absorbed by RKO Radio Pictures, she found herself at various times miscast in mediocre films. With the arrival of Katharine Hepburn at RKO, Twelvetrees left the studio to freelance (Harding and Bennett would also subsequently depart).

The 1930 film Her Man set the course of Twelvetrees' screen career, and she was cast in a series of roles portraying suffering women fighting for the wrong men. Later she appeared with Spencer Tracy in Now I'll Tell (also known as When New York Sleeps); with Donald Cook in The Spanish Cape Mystery; and with Maurice Chevalier in Paramount's A Bedtime Story. She also starred in two Metro-Goldwyn-Mayer films, which prompted author John Douglas Eames to note that she "had a gift for projecting emotional force with minimal visible effort."

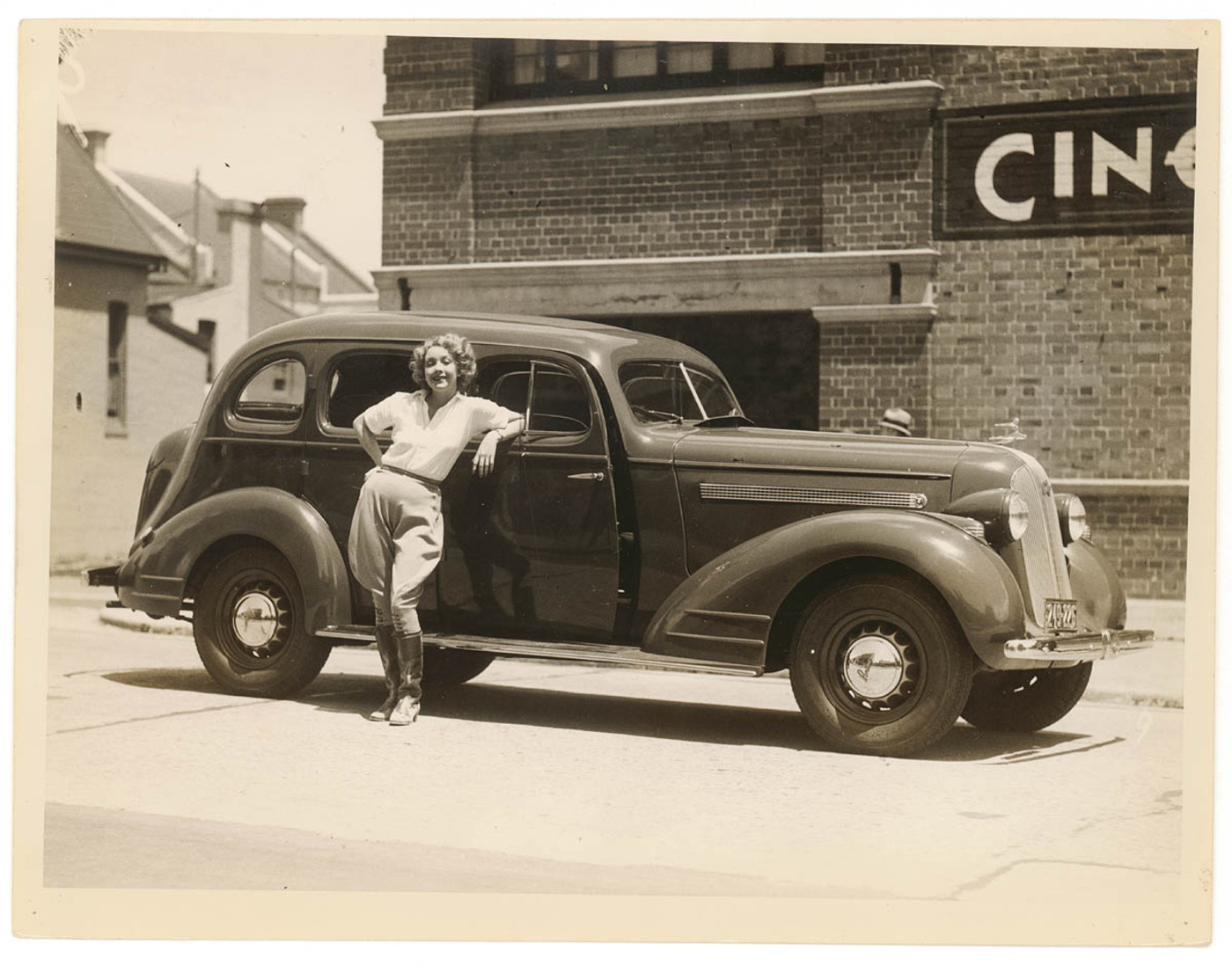
Helen Twelvetrees outside Cinesound Studios in Sydney, Australia (1936)

In 1936, Twelvetrees traveled to Australia to star in the Cinesound Studios production Thoroughbred, about the rise of a Melbourne Cup winning racehorse. The film was produced at Cinesound Studios in Bondi Junction. After filming completed, Twelvetrees returned home to Brooklyn, where she fell ill. After a slow recovery, she returned to acting in the USO production of The Man Who Came to Dinner. She made her final two films, Persons in Hiding and Unmarried, in 1939.

Twelvetrees left film in favor of summer stock and made her Broadway debut in Jacques Deval's Boudoir in 1941. The play folded after only 11 performances, and she largely retired after marrying for a third time. She continued to act occasionally, such as in the role of Blanche DuBois in A Streetcar Named Desire in summer stock in Sea Cliff, New York in August 1951. Fellow cast member Naomi Caryl recalled that Twelvetrees had "... the saddest eyes I'd ever seen ... it was also obvious that she had an extremely fragile psyche."

== Personal life ==
Twelvetrees was married three times. She married her first husband, actor Clark Twelvetrees, son of illustrator Charles Twelvetrees, in February 1927. During the marriage, her husband attempted suicide in the middle of a dinner party by jumping out of a Manhattan hotel window. He struck two awnings before landing on a parked taxi and was hospitalized for several months. In March 1930, she filed for divorce, citing mental cruelty. During the divorce trial, Twelvetrees claimed that her husband was an alcoholic who was drunk when they married and beat her on four occasions. Their divorce became final in March 1931. In August 1938, Clark Twelvetrees was arguing with a woman and struck her; she fell to the ground. A passerby, 29-year-old painter James Paskovics, intervened, and in the struggle Twelvetrees hit his head on a curb and died of a skull fracture. Murder charges against Paskovics were filed but later dismissed.

Helen Twelvetrees married again in April 1931, this time to World War I Marine Corps veteran Frank "Jack" Bryan Woody. Woody was a Hollywood stuntman and realtor, who would later become a full-time actor and seasonal hunting guide in California's Sierra Nevada. The two met on set while filming Her Man (1930) in Havana, Cuba. They had a son, Jack Bryan Woody (October 1932–2016), who became a prominent US Fish and Wildlife biologist. Twelvetrees divorced Woody in 1936, stating that he was essentially unemployed and living off her earnings. Post-divorce, the pair looked to continue their respective Hollywood careers and sent their child to Brooklyn to be raised by Twelvetrees' relatives. The failed marriage was the basis for the plot of the film I’m Still Alive (1940).

She married for a third and final time to farmer and Air Force Captain Conrad Payne in 1947. She spent her remaining years traveling the world with her husband, who was stationed in the U.S. and Europe.

== Death ==
On February 13, 1958, Twelvetrees was found unconscious on the floor of her living room at her home in Middletown, Pennsylvania, a suburb of Harrisburg, Pennsylvania. She was taken to Olmstead Air Force Base Hospital in Middletown, where she died. According to the county coroner, Twelvetrees had been suffering from a kidney ailment for some time and took an overdose of sedatives. Her death was ruled a suicide.

Twelvetrees' remains were later cremated. Her funeral service was attended by only her widower and a close friend, Geraldine Uglow, who was also living on the base with her military husband. Her ashes were interred in a grave in Middletown Cemetery. The gravesite was left unmarked until January 2013, when her family placed a headstone.

For her contribution to the motion-picture industry, Twelvetrees has a star on the Hollywood Walk of Fame, located at 6263 Hollywood Boulevard.

== In popular culture ==
The play I'm Looking for Helen Twelvetrees explores Twelvetrees' life through the eyes of another actor who saw her perform on Long Island. Parallels are explored between the life of Helen Twelvetrees and the character whom the other actor played (Blanche DuBois).

The famed Sloppy Joe's Bar in Havana, Cuba sold a cocktail named after Helen Twelvetrees in the 1930s. Twelvetrees and her second husband were regulars at the establishment while filming Her Man (1930). The drink consists of one part Gordon's Dry Gin, two parts pineapple juice, and drops of parfait amour, shaken with cracked ice and served in a tall glass.

== Filmography ==
Year	Title	Role	Notes
1929	The Ghost Talks	Miriam Holt	Lost film
1929	Blue Skies	Dorothy May	Episode 2
1929	Words and Music	Dorothy Blake	
1930	The Grand Parade	Molly	
1930	Swing High	Maryan Garner	
1930	Her Man	Frankie Keefe	
1930	The Cat Creeps	Annabelle West	Lost film
1931	The Painted Desert	Mary Ellen Cameron	Clark Gable's first major role
1931	Millie	Millicent "Millie" Blake Maitland	
1931	A Woman of Experience	Elsa Elsbergen	Alternative title: Registered Woman
1931	Bad Company	Helen King Carlyle	
1932	Panama Flo	Flo Bennett	
1932	Young Bride	Allie Smith Riggs	
1932	State's Attorney	June Perry	Alternative title: Cardigan's Last Case
1932	Is My Face Red?	Peggy Bannon	
1932	Unashamed	Joan Ogden	
1933	A Bedtime Story	Sally	
1933	Disgraced!	Gay Holloway	
1933	My Woman	Connie Riley Rollins	
1933	King for a Night	Lillian Williams	
1934	All Men Are Enemies	Katha	
1934	Now I'll Tell	Virginia Golden	Alternative titles: Now I'll Tell You; When New York Sleeps
1934	She Was a Lady	Sheila Vane	
1934	One Hour Late	Bessie Dunn	
1935	Times Square Lady	Margo Heath	
1935	She Gets Her Man	Francine	
1935	The Spanish Cape Mystery	Stella Godfrey	
1935	Frisco Waterfront	Alice	Alternative title: When We Look Back
1936	Thoroughbred	Joan	
1937	Hollywood Round-Up	Carol Stevens	
1939	Persons in Hiding	Helen Griswold	
1939	Unmarried	Pat Rogers	
