= Strange Marriage =

Strange Marriage may mean:

- alternate title of Slightly Married, a 1932 American film
- A Strange Marriage, a 1900 novel by Kálmán Mikszáth
  - Különös házasság (A Strange Marriage), a 1951 Hungarian film based on Mikszáth's novel
- A Strange Marriage, a 1912(?) novel by Charles Garvice
- Strange Marriage, a 1931 novel by Netta Syrett
- Strange Marriage, an early novel by Joseph Hansen
