= Orville Knapp =

American musician and bandleader (1904–1936)

Orville Knapp (January 1, 1904 - July 16, 1936) was an American dance bandleader born in Kansas City, Missouri. He was the brother of Evalyn Knapp.

Orville Knapp was an autodidact on saxophone, and moved to New York City in the early 1920s, where he played in the bands of Vincent Lopez and Leo Reisman. He then joined the Coon-Sanders Original Nighthawk Orchestra. Later in the 1920s, he formed his own group, which included Curly Howard, later one of the Three Stooges (Curly Howard was Shemp and Moe Howard's brother); their stage show often included a gag in which Howard, playing the part of orchestra conductor, would progressively lose pieces of his tuxedo as he led the band, including his pants.

Knapp's sister, Pauline (who used her middle name informally but her first name Evalyn professionally), had by this time moved to Hollywood to pursue work in film and become a star, appearing as leading lady with Edward G. Robinson and James Cagney in Smart Money (1931) and John Wayne in His Private Secretary (1933) among many others; Knapp joined her there in 1933, where he founded a new band. This group performed at the Grand Hotel in Santa Monica in 1934 and the Wilshire Hotel in Beverly Hills in 1935-1935, and recorded for Decca Records. Edith Caldwell, Ray Hendricks, Dave Marshall, Don Raymond, Norman Ruvell, and Virginia Verrill all served as vocalists for the group. Eventually, Leighton Noble became the group's regular singer. Critic Eugene Chadbourne remarked of Knapp's hiring process, "Knapp revealed an absolute lack of instinct for new talent by turning down both Stan Kenton and Spike Jones for the respective positions of pianist and drummer"

In 1935, Knapp's orchestra broadcast on WOR and went on a nationwide tour, recording in New York for Brunswick Records. He married Gloria Grafton, a Broadway star, that same year, and began taking flying lessons. In July 1936, while piloting a biplane, he crashed on the runway at Beverly Regional Airport and was killed.

Following Knapp's death, Noble took over the group, but he was pushed out by Knapp's widow and by the talent agency which managed the band. George Olsen became the orchestra's leader; Olsen later changed the group's name to the Music of Tomorrow Orchestra.
