= Beverly Regional Airport =

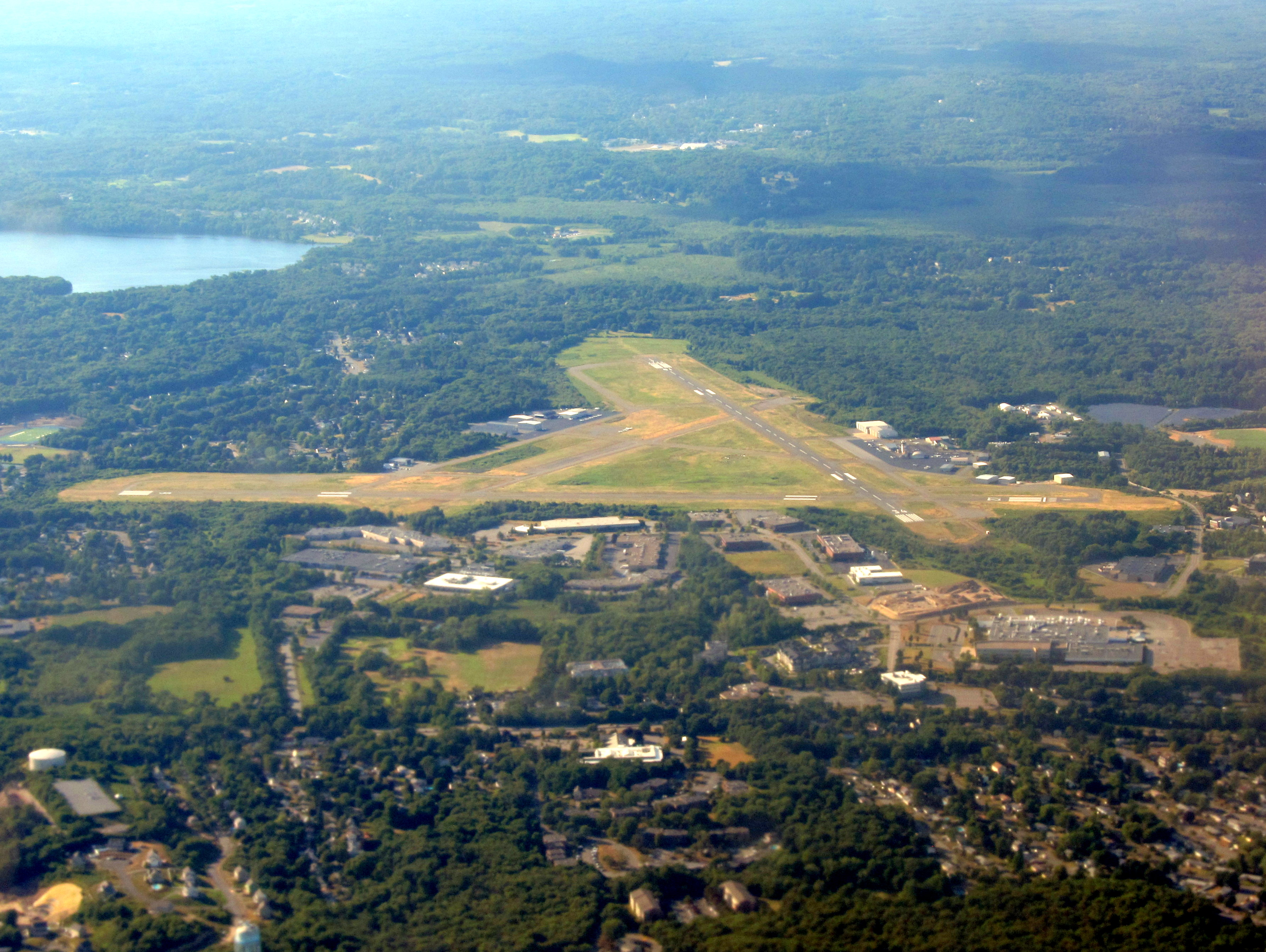
- IATA: BVY; ICAO: KBVY; FAA LID: BVY

Summary
- Airport type: Public
- Owner: City of Beverly
- Serves: Beverly, Massachusetts
- Location: Beverly, Danvers and Wenham, Massachusetts
- Elevation AMSL: 107 ft (33 m)
- Coordinates: 42°35′03″N 070°54′58″W
- Website: BeverlyAirport.com

Map
- Interactive map of Beverly Regional Airport

Runways
Direction	Length		Surface
Direction	ft	m	Surface
9/27	4,755	1,449	Asphalt
16/34	5,001	1,524	Asphalt

Statistics (2022)
- Aircraft operations: 83,897
- Based aircraft: 230
- Source: Federal Aviation Administration

Beverly Regional Airport (IATA: BVY, ICAO: KBVY, FAA LID: BVY) is a city-owned, public-use airport located in Beverly, Danvers and Wenham, Massachusetts, in Essex County, three nautical miles (6 km) northwest of Beverly's central business district.

The National Plan of Integrated Airport Systems for 2011–2015 categorized it as a reliever airport, which means it is available to relieve Logan International Airport of small general aviation type aircraft during Logan's peak traffic times.

== History ==
Beverly Regional Airport was built in 1928 on the farm of Adna and Addie Swift through the efforts of the Beverly Aero Club and the Beverly Chamber of Commerce. The City of Beverly took the land for a municipal airport by eminent domain from multiple owners in 1940 and 1941. The U.S. Navy operated the airport during World War II under a joint-use agreement as Naval Auxiliary Air Facility Beverly. It existed as an auxiliary air facility of Naval Air Station Squantum.

It was commissioned on 15 May 1943 and the airfield was upgraded with a new asphalt runway. The Navy built a control tower, a barracks, and other structures and consisted of four officers and sixty enlisted men. The field provided touch and go practice for students at Naval Air Station Squantum as well as Fleet Air Arm student pilots. Planes from Coast Guard Air Station Salem also used the facility for maritime patrol, as well as a detachment from VS-31, which flew anti-submarine patrols with Douglas SBD-5 aircraft.

It was decommissioned as a military facility on August 1, 1945. Ownership of the airport was transferred back to the City of Beverly in 1950.

== Facilities and aircraft ==
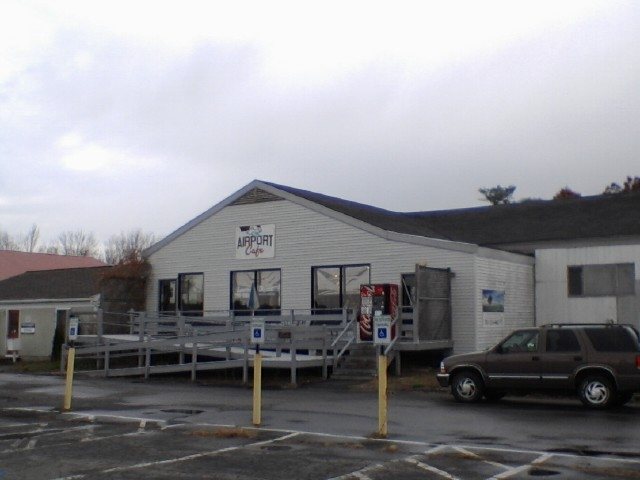
Originally the Beverly Airport Cafe, renamed Something Different cafe located at the Beverly Airport.

Beverly Regional Airport covers an area of 470 acres (190 ha) at an elevation of 107 feet (33 m) above mean sea level. It has two runways with asphalt surfaces: 9/27 is 4,755 by 100 feet (1,449 x 30 m) and 16/34 is 5,001 by 100 feet (1,524 x 30 m).

For the 12-month period ending December 31, 2022, the airport had 83,897 aircraft operations, an average of 230 per day: 97% general aviation, 3% air taxi, and <1% military. At that time 98 aircraft were based at this airport: 85 single-engine, 5 multi-engine, 5 helicopter, 2 jet, and 1 ultralight.

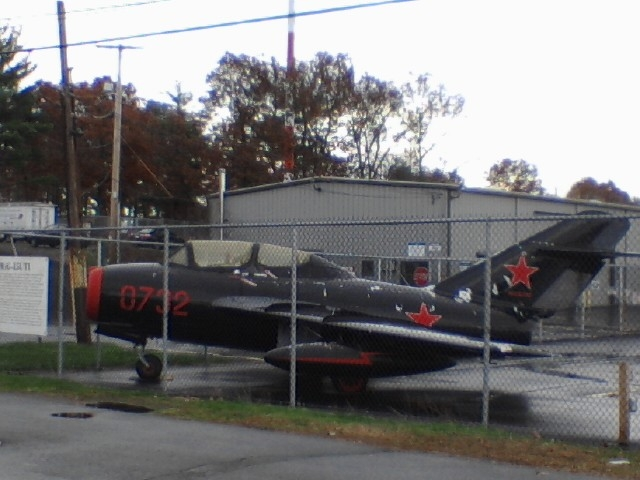
MiG-15UTI on informal display.

Civil Air Patrol Squadron MA-019, Beverly Composite Squadron, is headquartered at Beverly Regional Airport.

== Notable events ==
SCCA auto races were held at Beverly Airport in 1955 and 1956. The inaugural races were held on July 4, 1955. Phil Hill was the 1955 overall champion. The 1956 champion was Carroll Shelby.

A scene in the 2000 film The Perfect Storm, was shot at Beverly Airport.

In May 2008, a scene for the movie The Proposal was filmed at Beverly Airport.

== Accidents and incidents ==
On July 16, 1936, bandleader Orville Knapp, brother of actress Evalyn Knapp, died in a plane crash here after he misjudged a landing maneuver and stalled in mid-air.

On May 9, 1989, Alfred James Hunter III, a postal worker who had shot and killed his ex-wife earlier that evening, stole an airplane (a Cessna 152 two-seat trainer) at gunpoint from a flight instructor. During the flight, which stretched from Danvers to Duxbury, Hunter fired his gun at the ground below, buzzed the South Postal Annex in Boston several times, and briefly touched down at Logan Airport before taking off again. He landed at Logan more than three hours later and was arrested after a minor struggle with police.

On August 27, 2010, Michael Costales, age 30, a flight instructor at Beverly Regional Airport, was struck and killed by an aircraft's moving propeller. Costales had taxied his aircraft out to the run-up area of runway 34 at the airport, the active runway at the time. At about 12:30 PM, Costales got out of his Piper PA 28 Cherokee aircraft to assist another flight instructor and his student with fastening the canopy of their PiperSport aircraft. As Costales got out of his aircraft and walked toward the other aircraft, he was struck by his aircraft's propeller and killed instantly. The student pilot in the PiperSport aircraft declared an emergency with the Control Tower, who then called 911. The airport was subsequently shut down for several hours as an investigation was conducted.

On June 19, 2025, a Mooney M20F crashed on Sam Fonzo Drive upon departure from Beverly Regional Airport. Both occupants, Joseph Puciloski and Geoffrey Andrews, died in the crash.

== See also ==
- List of airports in Massachusetts
- List of military installations in Massachusetts
