= Alice Corkran =

Writer of children's fiction and magazine editor

- Born: 20 May 1843; Paris, France
- Died: 3 February 1916 (aged 72); Boscombe, then Hampshire but now Dorset, England
- Occupations: Writer and editor
- Years active: 1876–1912
- Known for: Writing and editing children's fiction
- Notable work: Down the Snow Stairs

Alice Abigail Corkran (1843–1916) was an Irish author of children's fiction and an editor of children's magazines. Born in France to Irish parents, she grew up in the stimulating environment of her mother's literary salon. She was a playmate of Robert Browning's ageing father, and still had his workbooks in her possession when she died. She wrote several well-received novels, particularly Bessie Lang and Down the Snow Stairs. She also edited first the Bairn's Annual and then The Girl's Realm, being the founder of that magazine's Guild of Service and Good Fellowship, which maintained a cot at the Ormond Street Hospital for Sick Children, among other charitable works.

== Early life ==
Alice Corkran was born in Paris, France, to John Frazer Corkran (1808–1884) and Louisa Walsh (1823–1892). She was the second oldest of five children: three girls, and two boys. Her father began life as a dramatist and had a play, The Painter of Italy, well received at the Theatre Royal, Dublin on 9 March 1840, but by that time he was already in Paris. (Note: The play must have been a success as it was also presented in the Theatre Royal the following May.) He was the Paris correspondent of the Morning Herald (Note: While the supplement to Allibone, the Stanford Companion, and the New Cambridge Bibliography gave the name of the paper as the London Herald, the Art Correspondent of the East Anglian Daily Times, who was very knowledgeable about the family, named it as the Morning Herald, which was from the same stable as the Evening Standard.) and the Evening Standard.

John was in Paris for all the excitement of the 1848 revolution and he wrote a book: History of the National Constituent Assembly from May, 1848 (1849) that was said to be still the standard text on the constituent assembly more than 30 years later.

Louisa Corkran married her husband in Dublin in June or July 1839. They were soon in Paris where their five children were born; the first, Henrietta in 1841.

Louisa's salon in Paris was frequented by M. Vigny, and by the whole literary group that acknowledged him as the leader. The poet Robert Browning was a friend, and his wife travelled twice a year to Paris to visit Louisa.

Thackeray, then writing Vanity Fair, was also a friend of the family and almost acted as a fairy godfather to the children. When the family returned to London, her house in Bloomsbury became a rendezvous for many eminent men and women of letters.

Alice Corkran grew up in a stimulating environment. She was the playmate of Robert Browning's father, and she used to accompany the old man on his rambles along the quays in search of subjects to sketch. She was the old man's favourite. She published some of his sketches to illustrate an article about the Brownings in The Girl's Realm in 1905. She still had his old notebooks with their sketches when she died.

Corkran was educated at home and studied art in Paris until the family had to leave Paris following some reverses of fortune. They moved to Bloomsbury in London.

== Works ==
=== Longer works ===
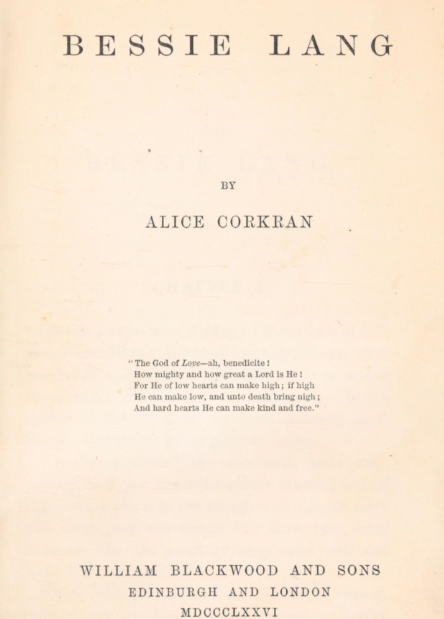
Bessie Lang 1876 - W. Blackwood and Sons

Corkran's fame rested in particular on her first novel Bessie Lang as well as her other novel Down the Snow Stairs. These works were cited occasionally to reference the author. Both attracted very positive critical attention on first publication. Of Bessie Lang reviewers said:

- "so sweet, so simple, and at the same time so strongly descriptive is the style in which this tale is told that it seems to have caught some feature of merit from each part in the telling." – The Examiner
- "If Miss Corkran is a novice in fiction, as her title-page would seem to indicate, she is a writer who may well have a future before her, for the pretty and touching tale she here gives us is told with a simplicity and absence of straining after effect which bespeak a true feeling for her art, whilst the beauty and pathos of many touches in it are unquestionable." – The Graphic
- "Indeed, so many the principal elements of a high-class work are undoubtedly to be found in " Bessie Lang," that the authoress may claim to have stepped at once into foremost place amongst contemporary writers of fiction. The reader will probably not have perused many pages without being agreeably reminded of such writings as those of Mrs. Gaskell, Mrs. Oliphant, Mrs. Craik, Miss Thackeray, whose works edify and interest by their purity and power rather than any perceptible straining after effect." – Birmingham Daily Gazette

Down the Snow Stairs also attracted a favourable critical response:

- "It is quite as enthralling as "Alice in Wonderland," but much more human and real. At the same time, every page is bathed in the golden and undying light of romance, without which a child's story-book is as uninteresting to little folks as an auctioneer's catalogue." – Sheffield Independent
- "We have rarely read anything better of its kind than "Down the Snow Stairs"." – The Scotsman
- "one of the most charming children’s stories imaginable, and will assuredly be very popular" – John Bull
- "We have to place this book alongside of Carrol's Alice in Wonderland...A better and brighter book we have not read for a long time." – Aberdeen Press and Journal

After 1890, all of Corkran's longer works were non-fiction. Her non-fiction works were also well received by critics, and one of her obituaries referred to her book on Leighton as an excellent critical biography.

The source for the following data is the British Library Catalogue (BL Cat.), supplemented and cross-checked against Kirk, Sutherland, Watson, Library Hub Discover, and the Circulating Library database, supplemented by searches of the used book trade. The year of publication has been corrected from the nominal year, where necessary, by checking for reviews of the books in newspaper archives. (Note: It was common practice at the time to date children's books for the following year as they were normally published for Christmas, and would still look "fresh" the following Christmas. This practice is described in the page on G. A. Henty.)

Novels and non-fiction longer works by Corkran
No	Year	Title	Illustrations	Pages	Publisher	Cat.	BL	IA	HT
1	1876	Bessie Lang		295	London: William Blackwood & Sons	Yes	Yes	Yes	Yes
2	1879	Latheby Towers. A novel		1,833 (v.1 275, v.2 292, v.3 266)	London : Richard Bentley & Son	Yes	Yes	Yes	No
3	1882	The Adventures of Mrs. Wishing-to-be and other stories	(3 f.p. colour illust.)	192	London : Blackie & Son	Yes	No	Yes	Yes
4	1883	The Wings of Courage and the Cloud Spinner (translated from George Sand		192	London : Blackie & Son	Yes	No	No	No
5	1886	Down the Snow Stairs	Gordon Browne (60 illust. inc. 5 f.p.)	257	London : Blackie & Son	Yes	No	Yes	Yes
6	1887	Margery Merton's Girlhood	Gordon Browne (6 f.p. illust.)	286	London : Blackie & Son	Yes	No	No	No
7	1888	Meg's Friend	Robert Fowler (6 f.p. illust.)	288	London : Blackie & Son	Yes	No	No	No
8	1888	Joan's Adventures at the North Pole and elsewhere	b/w f.piece by Horace Petherick	160	London : Blackie & Son	Yes	No	No	No
9	1889	The Fatal House	No	143	London : Ward & Downey	Yes	Yes	No	No
10	1892	The Poets' Corner, or Haunts and homes of the poets	Allan Barraud	66	London: Ernest Nister	Yes	Yes	Yes	Yes
11	1903	Miniatures (Little Books on Art)	52 b/w plates	206	London : Methuen & Co.	No	No	No	No
12	1904	Frederic Leighton (Little Books on Art)	3 b/w plates	221	London : Methuen & Co.	Yes	No	No	Yes
13	1905	The Romance of Woman's Influence	Illustrated: f.piece and portraits	377	London : Blackie & Son	Yes	No	No	No
14	1908	The National Gallery	16 b/w plates	234	London : Wells Gardner, Darton & Co.	Yes	No	Yes	No
15	1910	The Dawn of British History	M. Lavars Harry (160+ illust. Inc. 16 f.p.)	246	London : George G. Harrap & Co.	Yes	No	Yes	No
16	1910	The Life of Queen Victoria for boys and girls	Alan Wright (8 colour illust.)	150	London: T. C. & E. C. Jack	Yes	No	No	No

Legend for the column headings:

- Cat.: Found in the Catalogue of the British Library
- BL: Digital copy online at the British Library
- IA: Digital copy online at the Internet Archive
- HT: Digital copy online at HathiTrust

Margery Merton's Girlhood is available online at Google Books, and Meg's Friend as a Gutenberg eText.

One work stands out on the list as being very dissimilar from the others, The Fatal House. This is a cheaply-priced (one shilling) melodrama completely unlike Corkran's other output, and there are no references on the title page to her other works. As noted in the table above, it is available as an online text at the British Library. The Morning Post said of the book: "Miss Alice Corkran has written a tale sufficiently full of mystery and horror to satisfy the most voracious appetite. "The Fatal House" exercises a baneful influence on all who reside under its roof. The history of its owners is one of crime, vice, and debauchery; nothing but evil survives within its sin-tainted walls. Such ample evidence of this is adduced, that the unhappy wife of the last owner, in a state bordering on delirium, burns the house and its contents to the ground, thus lifting the curse which she feels has been laid upon it. It is an un- canny story from beginning to end, and its tone is morbid and unpleasant."

=== Anthologies ===
Corkran published three anthologies of her stories:

- The Adventures of Mrs. Wishing-To-Be and Other Stories (see within longer works above) contained the title story, plus "Willie and Mary in Search of Fairy Land" and "Wish-Day".
- Mischievous Jack and Other Stories contained "Mischievous Jack and the Old Fisherman" and "A Little King" which had both appeared in the first volume of The Bairn's Annual in 1885; and "Boppy's Repentance".
- The Young Philistine, and Other Stories contained the title story, previously published as "A Young Philistine" in Merry England in 1885; "Pere Perrault's Legacy", which had first appeared as "How Pere Perrault Spent his Legacy" in Belgravia in July 1882; "A Village Genius" first published as "Mademoiselle Angele" in The Gentleman's Annual for 1881; and the lead story of the collection "The English Teacher at the Convent", which Sutherland said was notable among the short stories of Corkran, which "have some charm". The story is a version of "Miss Martha's Bag", which appeared in the first number of Merry England. The Athenaeum said of this collection that: "We find in Miss Corkran’s work a delicacy of touch, a fine humour, and a pathos which give to these little stories something of the charm and finish of a miniature."

Anthologies of stories by Alice Corkran
No	Year	Title	Pages	Publisher	BL Cat.
1	1886	The Young Philistine: and other stories	232	London: Burns & Oates	Yes
2	1888	Mischievous Jack, and other stories	64	London: Blackie & Son	Yes

The Young Philistine and other stories is available online at Google Books. Other anthologies that Corkran contributed to were:

- The story "Pea Blossom" in Stories Jolly: Stories New: Stories Strange & Stories True. A Series of New and Original Tales For Boys and Girls, From Six to Fourteen Years Old (1889), edited by H. C. Adams, and published in London by Skeffington & Son
- "The Adventures of a Would-Be King of the Giants" in The Children's Hour. A collection of stories & poems, (1896), edited by May Bateman and published in London by Simpkin & Marshall. This publication was sold in aid of the Princess May's Invalid Children's Aid Association.
- An unnamed story in the anthology 52 Stories for the Little Ones (1902), published in London by Hutchinson & Co. as part of their "52" series

=== Editing and shorter works ===
Corkran edited the Bairn's Annual from 1885 to 1890 and contributed articles to it at the same time. The 1885 Annual is available online at Google Books. The annual was well received with the Freeman's Journal saying: "This is one of the most well-arranged and interesting children's books that we have seen for a long time, containing little stories of almost every class, and an original song with music. There is an etching as a frontispiece entitled "In Disgrace", which is worth all the money the book costs." That front-piece was by William Luker jnr.

The first issue of The Girl's Realm was published in 1898 with Corkran as both a contributor and editor. The first edition of the magazine, with 140 illustrations, was well reviewed. In the advert for The Girl's Realm in the London Daily News of 26 October 1898, the following reviewer comments about the magazine are quoted:

- "far out-distances anything of the kind hitherto offered" – World
- "The variety in this number is extraordinary. . . The public reflects great credit on all concerned in its production..." – Daily News:
- "appears to mix all the desirable ingredients of a girl's reading in happy proportion." – Queen

The Girl's Realm ran for 17 volumes from November 1898 to November 1915. It then seems to have been folded into The Woman at Home, where Corkran was the editor for three years, resigning in early 1902. She remained involved with the magazine, not only as a contributor, but also as the founder and guiding spirit of the Guild of Service and Good Fellowship, one of the leading features of the magazine.

The guild was founded in April 1900 by Corkran and charged a nominal subscription to members. The guild supported a cot at the Ormond Street Hospital for Sick Children, and also provided a scholarship to the Royal College of Music. Other activities included providing Christmas treats, one in Bethnal Green for 117 children and one in Kensal Green for 360 children, with the Guild members themselves providing the presents. The guild had over 2,300 members by 1905.

Kirk, who wrote in 1891, reported that Corkran "is now a journalist, contributing to many London papers." Corkran contributed stories and pieces to a range of publications, including the magazines:

- The Gentleman's Annual for 1881 - "Mademoiselle Angele". Available at Google Books.
- Belgravia - "How Pere Perrault Spent his Legacy". Available at Google Books.
- Merry England - "Miss Martha's Bag", "A Face in the Window" (Aug 1883), "The Doctor's Guest" (Mar 1884), "A Young Philistine", "Pere Perrault's Legacy", "A Village Genius". Also articles. Available at Internet Archive.
- The Bairn's Annual - "Mischievous Jack and the Old Fisherman" and "A Little King". Available at Google Books.
- The Gentleman's Magazine - "Doctor Gregory", (Mar 1892). Available at Google Books.
- Aunt Judy's Magazine
- The Girl's Realm
- The Lady's Realm
- Atalanta
- The Scottish Art Review
- The Leeds: Mercury Supplement
- Jabberwock

In 1902, after leaving the editorship of The Girl's Realm, Corkran was a literary reviewer in the Daily News and was also contributing articles to various London papers.

== Later life and death ==
Corkran's mother, Louisa, died in 1882. She had been in declining health for some time and in her final years she depended largely on her daughter Alice's care. Corkran's father died in 1884 and her parents are buried together at Brompton Cemetery.

Corkran had a health scare in October 1892 when she was run over by a brougham in Exhibition Road, South Kensington, London. Her leg was badly injured and she suffered from shock, and recovered only slowly, so that it was the end of the year before she could resume literary work.

In 1901, Corkran was living in Mecklenburgh Square with her sister Harriet and Richard Whiteing. She was still living with Whiteing (who had separated from his wife) at the time of the 1911 census where she described her position in the house as inmate, which the enumerator corrected to the approved term boarder.

Both her sisters died in 1911. Henrietta, who died on 17 March 1911, had never married. Her sister Mary had married Barclay V. Head of the British Museum and had one daughter, Alice Augusta Louisa, who was living with her father at the time of the 1911 census (immediately after her mother's death on 30 March 1911). The dates of the deaths of the two brothers is uncertain, but Whiteing says that Alice was the last remaining survivor of her branch of the family, and one death notice referred to her being the last surviving child of her late father.

Corkran was plagued by poverty in her later years and also suffered from declining health. She died suddenly, but not unexpectedly, on 2 February 1916. Her niece, Alice Augusta Louisa Head, was an executrix of her will.
