= Marian Pritchard =

British writer

Marian Elizabeth Pritchard
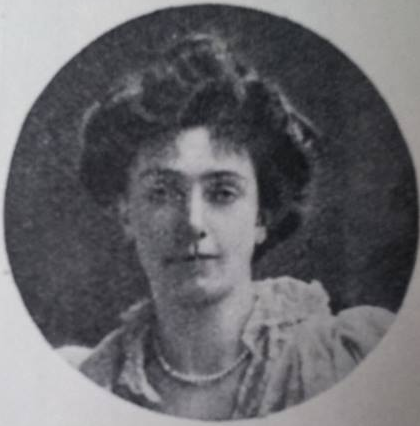
- Marian Pritchard, 1902
- Born: Marian Westropp-Dawson; 6 April 1869
- Died: 1 December 1945 (aged 76)
- Occupations: Fashion journalist, writer
- Years active: 1890s-1930s
- Known for: The Cult of Chiffon
- Spouses: George Eric Campbell Pritchard (m. 1894; div. 1912) Hon. Charles Cecil Orlando Weld Forester (m. 1913; died 1937)

Marian Elizabeth Pritchard (6 April 1869 – 1 December 1945) was a late 19th- and early 20th-century British fashion writer and journalist who predominantly wrote under her formal married names Mrs. Eric Pritchard and from 1918, Mrs. C. W. Forester. She is most famous as the author of the 1902 style manual The Cult of Chiffon, and has been described as "one of the first truly outspoken high-profile fashion journalists."

== Early and personal life ==
Marian Elizabeth Westropp-Dawson was born on 6 April 1869. Her first husband was the paediatrician George Eric Campbell Pritchard, whom she married in 1894 and had a son with. When she began writing, she was known as Mrs. Eric Pritchard. The marriage ended in divorce in 1912, a petition from George Pritchard naming the Honourable Charles Cecil Orlando Weld-Forester as a co-respondent. On 1 April 1913, Marian married Weld-Forester, although continued writing as "Mrs. Eric Pritchard" until 1918, when The Daily Telegraph first noted she was now the Hon Mrs. C. W. Forester on 12 October 1918, and by 21 December noted that she was now "solely described" as Mrs C. W. Forester. Charles Weld-Forester died on 23 November 1937 at the age of 68, and Marian died, aged 76, on 1 December 1945.

== Career ==
Writing as Mrs. Eric Pritchard, Marian was a regular columnist for The Lady and fashion editor for The Lady's Realm in the 1890s and 1900s. As a writer, Pritchard's work was noted for its sensuality and appreciation of the romantic and erotic potential of fashion, and how clothing could be used to present and construct the wearer's femininity. Her pieces for The Lady's Realm often discussed underwear at great length, arguing that even the most virtuous women could appreciate attractive lingerie without being accused of immorality. Pritchard compared the pursuit of chic and the appreciation of fashion to a modern-day religion, echoing her contemporaries such as the Comtesse de Tramar, who wrote books on beauty with purposefully religious-sounding titles such as Le Bréviaire De La Femme (1903), and L'Evangile Profane: Rite Féminin (The Profane Gospel: Female Rite, 1905). Whilst praising intelligence in a woman, both Pritchard and Tramar acknowledged the necessity of having to maintain one's appeal to a husband in order to preserve quality of life at that time, and encouraged their readers to combine their intelligence with clever dressing and good grooming. A contemporary review of Pritchard's Cult of Chiffon (1902) summarised this as "Man desires intelligence, but he hopes to find it clothed in becoming garments." However, Pritchard's writing has also been criticised for showing "aggressive" and "conventional middle-class attitudes" and of using the language of "cultural terrorism" as defined by Pierre Bourdieu to attack athletic women and progressive or practical clothing.

As a friend of Daisy Greville, Countess of Warwick, Pritchard moved in the same circles as the fashion designer Lucile and her sister, the novelist Elinor Glyn, which made her well-positioned to commentate on fashion for a society audience.

In 1904, Pritchard started writing for The Daily Telegraph, for whom she wrote fashion columns and articles until May 1937.

=== The Cult of Chiffon ===
The Cult of Chiffon by Mrs. Eric Pritchard was a style manual intended to explain chic and stylish dressing, using the concept of the "Lady of Chiffon" to represent the New Woman of the early 20th century. The Lady of Chiffon was confident and self-assured, aware of her seductive femininity, and while she followed fashion with interest, she also enjoyed expressing her individualism and personal taste. The book was originally published by Grant Richards in 1902, with illustrations by Rose le Quesne, and dedicated to the Countess of Warwick. An unabridged reprint was produced by Dover Publications in 2017.

The Cult of Chiffon is particularly noted for its emphasis on the importance of attractive underwear to a woman's self-esteem, and its role in maintaining successful marriages. Pritchard compared the enjoyment of wearing fine lingerie to loving art and poetry, arguing that it should be a universal right. When considering the unattractive but practical underwear of the 19th century such as grey coutil corsets and "drab" high-necked merino wool combinations, Pritchard bluntly stated that such "hideous" garments caused the failure of marriages, driving husbands to have affairs or go where they could "admire the petticoat of aspiration", and argued that women should prioritise beautiful underwear in their wardrobes. She gave advice for those on tight clothing budgets on how they could use cheap muslin and washable silk to make themselves attractive underwear. Despite the popularity of white undergarments, which Pritchard approved of, she also encouraged women to consider having their underwear in flattering shades of blue, pink and yellow, and even noted an emerging trend for black lingerie which could be flattering and effective if worn well. While black was often associated with mourning dress, Pritchard recommended that every woman, whatever their budget, should own at least one good, well-cut black dress for regular wear.

Writing as Mrs. C. W. Forester, she published another style manual in 1925 titled Success Through Dress.
