= Police Car 17 =

1933 film

- Directed by: Lambert Hillyer
- Written by: Lambert Hillyer
- Produced by: Harry Cohn
- Starring: Tim McCoy; Evalyn Knapp; Edwin Maxwell
- Cinematography: Benjamin H. Kline
- Edited by: Otto Meyer
- Production company: Columbia Pictures
- Distributed by: Columbia Pictures
- Release date: September 30, 1933
- Running time: 57 minutes
- Country: United States
- Language: English

Police Car 17 is a 1933 American pre-Code crime film directed by Lambert Hillyer and starring Tim McCoy, Evalyn Knapp and Edwin Maxwell.

== Cast ==
- Tim McCoy as Tim Conlon
- Evalyn Knapp as Helen Regan
- Edwin Maxwell as Big Bill Standish
- Ward Bond as Bumps O'Neill
- DeWitt Jennings as Captain T. J. Hart
- Wallis Clark as Lt. Dan Regan
- Harold Huber as Johnny Davis
- Wally Albright as Jimmy
- Jack Long as Ace Boyle
- Charles West as Harry (as Charlie West)
- Jessie Arnold as Neighbor (uncredited)
- Selmer Jackson as Police Radio Dispatcher (uncredited)
- Tom London as Police Detective (uncredited)

== Bibliography ==
- Alan G. Fetrow. Sound films, 1927-1939: a United States Filmography. McFarland, 1992.
