= The Fire Trap =

- Directed by: Burt P. Lynwood
- Written by: Charles F. Royal
- Produced by: Larry Darmour
- Starring: Norman Foster; Evalyn Knapp; Sidney Blackmer
- Cinematography: Bert Longenecker
- Edited by: Earl Turner
- Production company: Beacon Productions
- Distributed by: Empire Pictures
- Release date: November 26, 1935
- Running time: 63 minutes
- Country: United States
- Language: English

The Fire Trap is a 1935 American drama film directed by Burt P. Lynwood and starring Norman Foster, Evalyn Knapp and Sidney Blackmer.

== Plot ==
An insurance investigator goes on the trail of a gang of arsonists.

== Cast ==
- Norman Foster as Bill Farnsworth
- Evalyn Knapp as Betty Marshall
- Sidney Blackmer as Cedric McIntyre
- Oscar Apfel as R.A. Rawson
- Ben Alexander as Bob Fender
- Herbert Corthell as Commodore Brunton
- Marie Callahan as Secretary

== Bibliography ==
- Pitts, Michael R. Poverty Row Studios, 1929–1940: An Illustrated History of 55 Independent Film Companies, with a Filmography for Each. McFarland & Company, 2005.
