= Leighton Noble =

American singer (1912–1994)

Leighton Noble, born Faye Leighton Jepson (December 25, 1912 – March 5, 1994) was an American vocalist and bandleader active during the swing era. He was also an actor and television presenter.

Noble's parents divorced when he was young, and he took his stepfather's surname. He learned piano as a child and put together a band called the Blue Blazers while a student at Pasadena High School. He matriculated at Pasadena City College and led a larger band on campus, but after two years of study, he won a singing contest at Los Angeles's Cocoanut Grove Ballroom and quit school. The contest was run by Phil Harris, and the prize was singing with Harris's orchestra for a week; Noble parlayed this into a job singing for Hal Grayson, and soon after was working with George Hamilton, Everett Hoagland, and George Olsen. In 1935 Noble was hired by Orville Knapp as lead vocalist of his orchestra, but Knapp was killed in a plane crash the following spring, and Noble took temporary control over the group's management. Knapp's widow and management team wanted Olsen to take over Knapp's orchestra, and they succeeded in pushing Noble out in late 1936, after a tour of New York and Pittsburgh.

Early in 1937, Noble assembled his own band, which included several former members of Knapp's band (such as vocalist Edith Caldwell and pianist Charles Floyd). Noble sang lead male vocals, though Johnny McAfee occasionally joined him. His first engagement was at Frank Dailey's Meadowbrook in New Jersey and was an immediate success; he later played the Arcadia Ballroom in Philadelphia and other venues in the eastern United States. He recorded for Vocalion, Coral, and Bluebird as a leader. In 1940 Noble and Floyd parted ways, and Noble moved the band to California, where he continued playing Los Angeles-area venues (such as Hollywood's Stage Door canteen), in addition to pursuing film roles. Noble worked with the USO during World War II and played the Trianon Ballroom in Chicago in 1947. Later that year, he was offered the position of host on a television show broadcast by Los Angeles station KTLA. The program was broadcast for six years and included early appearances from Rowan & Martin and Liberace. Soon after the run of this show he made several uncredited appearances in Hollywood films, including as a bandleader in White Christmas.

In May of 1950, Noble and his band opened the summer season at the legendary Elitch Gardens Trocadero Ballroom.

Starting in the mid-1950s, Noble began working in Nevada, at Lake Tahoe and in Las Vegas; he led the house band at Harrah's South Shore Room with Vocalist Ray Vasquez and Sammy Davis Jr in Lake Tahoe for much of the 1960s. He moved to Vancouver, British Columbia at the end of the decade, making a few appearances as a band leader in the 1970s. He returned in 1982 with a new band; he suffered a stroke in 1990, but continued performing until 1993, the year before his death, at age 81.

== Filmography ==
Year	Title	Role	Notes
1934	Gift of Gab	Orchestra Leader	
1943	It Ain't Hay	Private Joe Collins	
1943	Crazy House	Johnny	
1945	Blonde from Brooklyn	Leighton Noble, Orchestra Leader	Uncredited
1945	Confidential Agent	Piano Player	Uncredited
1954	White Christmas	Bandleader	Uncredited
1955	Dial Red O	Charlie - Dispatcher	Uncredited
1955	Seven Angry Men	Merchant	Uncredited
1955	Bring Your Smile Along	Orchestra Conductor	Uncredited
1955	At Gunpoint	Bob, the New Teller	Uncredited, (final film role)
