= The Marines Are Here =

1938 film directed by Phil Rosen

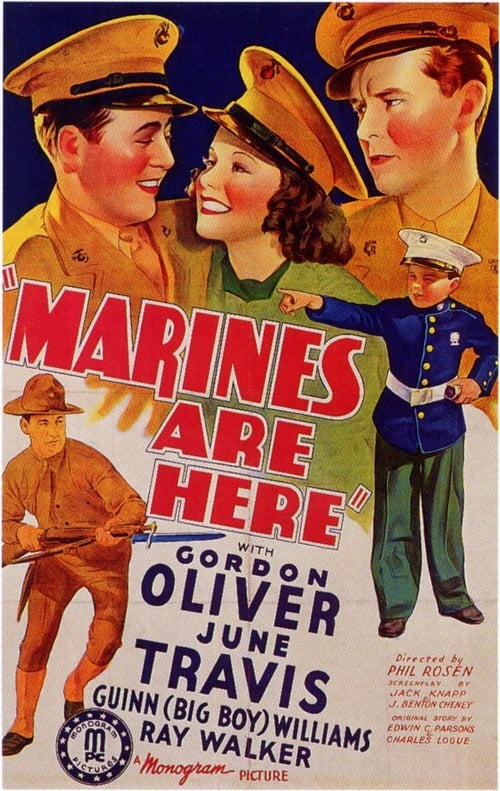
- Poster for the film
- Directed by: Phil Rosen
- Screenplay by: Jack Knapp; J. Benton Cheney
- Story by: Edwin C. Parsons; Charles A. Logue; Franklyn Adreon
- Produced by: Scott R. Dunlap
- Starring: Gordon Oliver; June Travis; Ray Walker
- Cinematography: Gilbert Warrenton
- Edited by: Russell Schoengarth
- Music by: Abe Meyer
- Production company: Monogram Pictures
- Release date: June 8, 1938
- Running time: 62 minutes
- Country: United States
- Language: English

The Marines Are Here is a 1938 American comedy-drama film, directed by Phil Rosen. It stars Gordon Oliver, June Travis, and Ray Walker, and was released on June 8, 1938.

== Cast ==
- Gordon Oliver as Jones
- June Travis as Terry
- Ray Walker as Hogan
- Guinn "Big Boy" Williams as Sergeant Gibbons
- Ronnie Cosbey as Tommy
- Billy Dooley as Mugsy
- Pat Gleason as One Step
- Edward Earle as Lieutenant Drake
- Wade Boteler as Sergeant Foster
- Harry Semels
