= A Woman Rebels =

1936 film by Mark Sandrich

- Theatrical release poster
- Directed by: Mark Sandrich
- Screenplay by: Ernest Vajda; Anthony Veiller
- Based on: Portrait of a Rebel; 1930 novel by Netta Syrett
- Produced by: Pandro S. Berman
- Starring: Katharine Hepburn; Herbert Marshall; Elizabeth Allan; Donald Crisp; Doris Dudley; David Manners
- Cinematography: Robert De Grasse
- Edited by: Jane Loring
- Music by: Roy Webb
- Production company: RKO Pictures
- Distributed by: RKO Pictures
- Release date: November 6, 1936
- Running time: 88 minutes
- Country: United States
- Languages: English; Italian
- Budget: $574,000
- Box office: $583,000

A Woman Rebels is a 1936 American historical drama film adapted from the 1930 novel Portrait of a Rebel by Netta Syrett and starring Katharine Hepburn as Pamela Thistlewaite, who rebels against the social mores of Victorian England. The film was directed by Mark Sandrich; it was the film debut of Van Heflin, and the second last film of David Manners.

Hepburn's performance as the defiant young woman is considered by many critics the epitome of her feminist characterizations of the 1930s.

== Plot ==
In Victorian London, Pamela defies her autocratic father, and has a baby out of wedlock with her lover, Gerald Waring Gaythorne. Pamela's pregnant sister Flora hears of the death of her young husband, faints, hurting herself, and dies. Pamela raises her illegitimate daughter as her niece and becomes a crusading journalist for women's rights. Eventually she agrees to marry diplomat Thomas Lane after being unfairly named as co-respondent in Gaythorne's divorce.

== Cast ==
- Katharine Hepburn as Pamela Thistlewaite
- Herbert Marshall as Thomas Lane
- Elizabeth Allan as Flora Anne Thistlewaite
- Donald Crisp as Judge Byron Thistlewaite
- Doris Dudley as Young Flora
- David Manners as Lieutenant Alan Craig Freeland
- Lucile Watson as Betty Bumble
- Van Heflin as Lord Gerald Waring Gaythorne
- Marilyn Knowlden as Flora (age 9)
- Connie Emerald as Lady Gaythorne
- Barnett Parker as Lady Gaythorne's Lawyer
- Leonard Carey as Lord Gaythorne's Butler
- Elspeth Dudgeon as Lord Gaythorne's Maid
- Eily Malyon as Miss Piper
- Doris Lloyd as Mrs. Seaton
- Molly Lamont as Young Mother
- Lillian Kemble-Cooper as Lady Rinlake

== Reception ==
With a box office loss estimated at a hefty $222,000 for RKO, this was Hepburn's third flop in a row which contributed to Hepburn being one of the actors labeled "box office poison" in the infamous 1938 advertisement created by Harry Brandt, president of the Independent Theatre Owners of America.
