= Robert Fowler (artist) =

Scottish artist

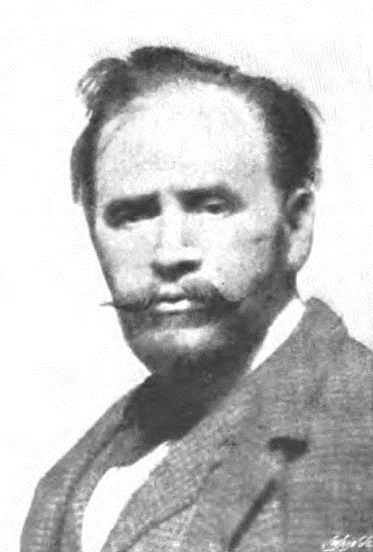
Robert Fowler

Robert Fowler RI (1853–1926) was a Scottish artist who painted mythological scenes and landscapes.

== Biography ==
Fowler was born in 1853 in Cellardyke, Fife, and was brought up mainly by his uncle and aunt while his parents were away on business. He showed a very early aptitude for art, starting first with pencil drawings then moving on to painting and clay modelling. His family moved to Liverpool and Fowler went to school at Liverpool College. At the age of 16, he found employment in a commercial office where his talent for art was recognised by his employer, who encouraged Fowler's parents to send him to art school.

Fowler went to London to study at the Heatherley School of Fine Art and the South Kensington Schools. He also spent much time making drawings of the exhibits in the British Museum, being particularly impressed by the Elgin Marbles, and found inspiration in the local art galleries. However, his art studies were curtailed by health problems which necessitated a long period of "convalescence" in Yorkshire and Llandudno in Wales. While in Wales, Fowler painted landscapes, such as "View of Conwy Bay," "Old Roman Bridge Near Swansea," and "Mist on Cader Idris."

He moved back to Liverpool and took an art studio in Castle Street, which became his base for several decades. He exhibited his work at the Liverpool autumn exhibitions in 1875, and at the Royal Academy, London, in 1876. He designed posters for the Walker Gallery, and also had work exhibited abroad in Paris and Munich. His studio became a magnet for other artists, writers and musicians. He moved to London in the early 1900s and had a studio in Tite street, Chelsea for some years. Fowler also illustrated a number of children's books, including work by Alice Corkran and G. A. Henty.

Fowler became a member of the Royal Institute of Painters in Water Colours (RI) in 1891, and the Royal Society of Painters in Water Colours. His style was classical – frequently drawing on mythological themes – but also with strong elements of symbolism and Japonism. Artists who influenced Fowler included Frederic Leighton, Albert Moore, George Watts, James Whistler, Frederick Walker and David Woodlock (1842–1929).

== List of selected works ==
- Eve
- Ariel
- A Naiad
- Dance of Salome (1885)
- A World of Colours (1887)
- The Nymph
- Girl with Poppies
- Sleep (1893)
- Butterflies (1895)
- The Streamlet,
- The Coming of Apollo
- The Enchanted Glade
- The Silver Shell
- The Butterfly
- Aphrodite
- Venus and Cupid
- Dreaming
- Widow's Mite
- The Necklace
- The Voice of Spring
- Merlin and the Enchanted Princess (or "Charity")
- Stars of the Summer Night
- After Music
- He Loves Me He Loves Me Not
- Mist on Cader Idris
- View of Conwy Bay

Some of his landscapes were included as illustrations in Wilmot-Buxton's travel book "Wales" (A & C Black, 1911).

== Gallery ==
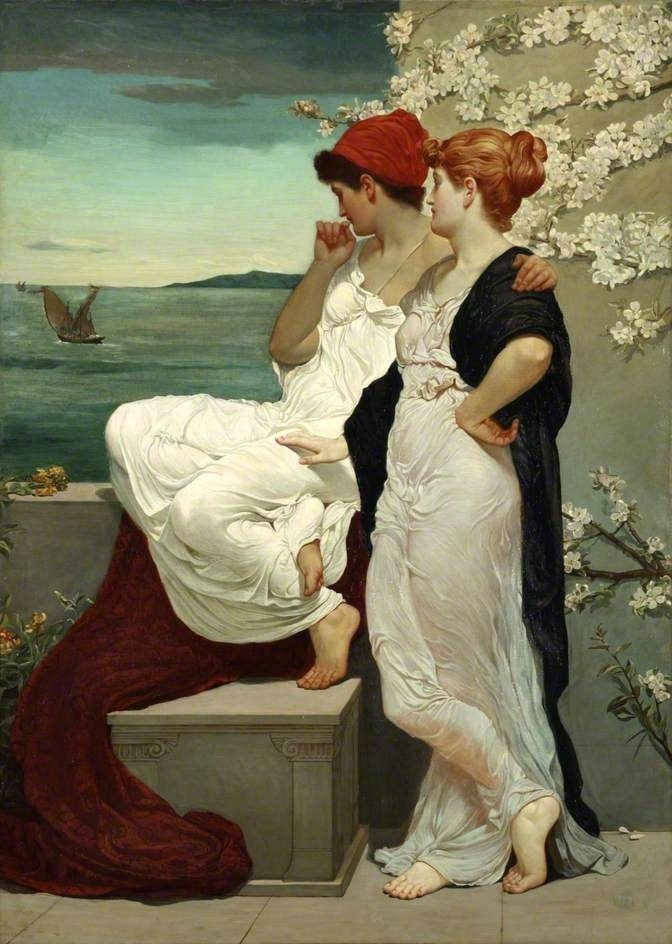
Women of Phoenicia (1879)

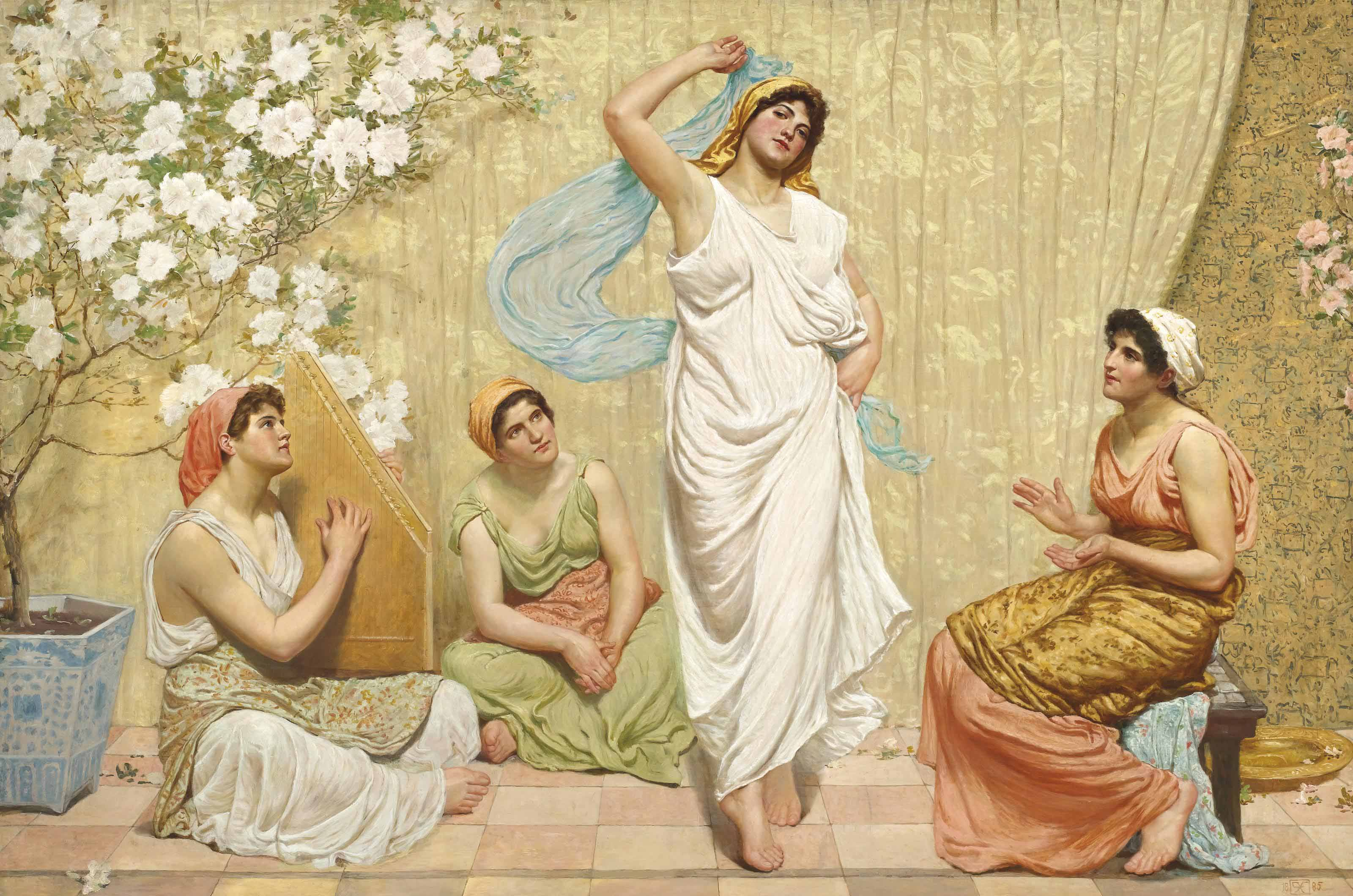
The Dance of Salome (1885)

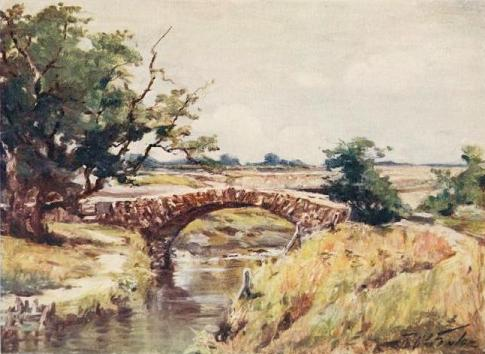
Old Roman Bridge near Swansea

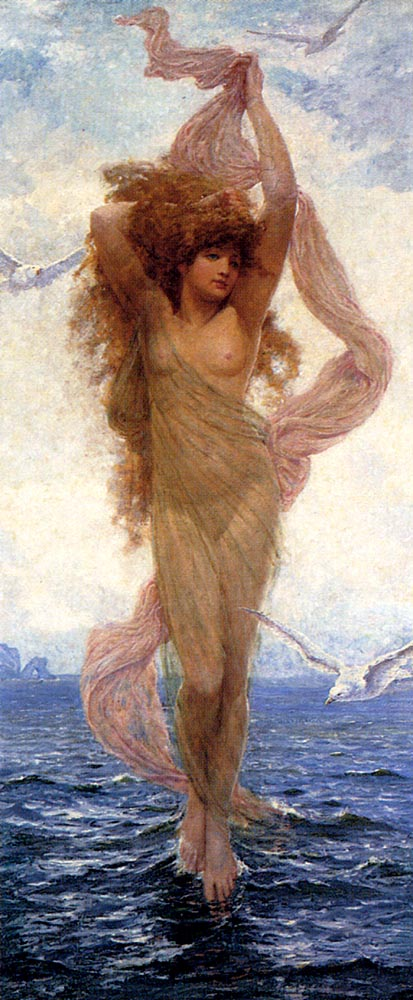
The Birth of Venus

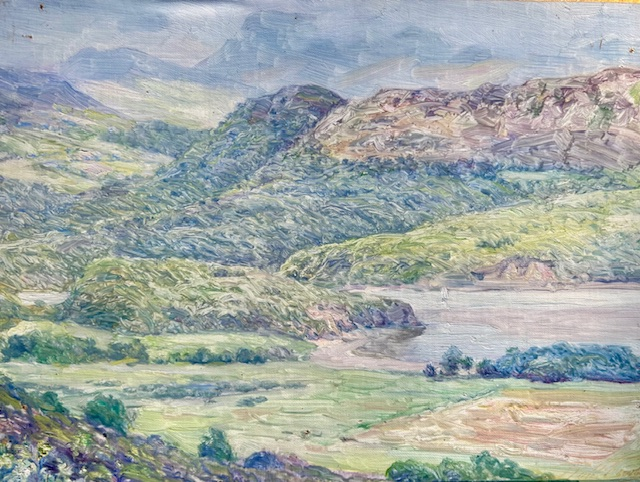
Mist on Cader Idris

== Bibliography (and references) ==
- Studio international, Volume 9 (London, Cory, Adams & Mackay etc., 1897) pp. 85–98.
- The Magazine of Art, Volume 22 (Cassell, 1898) pp. 3–11
- Wilmot-Buxton, E. M & Fowler, Robert (illustrator). Wales (A & C Black, 1911)
- Mayo, Ralph. In search of Robert Fowler R.I. Victorian Artist (Trafford Pub., 2004)

== External links and references ==
- 37 artworks by or after Robert Fowler at the Art UK site
- Paintings by Fowler (Art Renewal Center Museum)
- Fowler biography
- Dance of Salome (Christie's)
- Works by Robert Fowler at Project Gutenberg

Robert Fowler in libraries (WorldCat catalog)
