= George Hamilton (musician) =

American bandleader and songwriter (1901–1957)

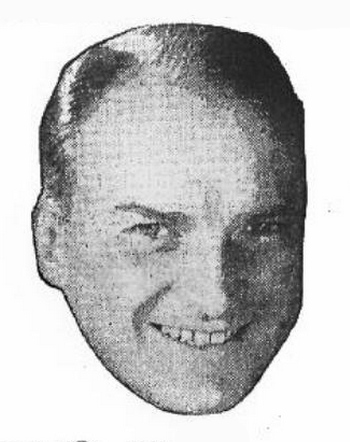
- Hamilton in a 1943 advertisement
- Born: George William Hamilton; January 13, 1901; Newport, Vermont, U.S.
- Died: March 31, 1957 (aged 56); New York City, U.S.
- Education: Dartmouth College (1923)
- Occupations: Musician, bandleader
- Spouses: Patricia O'Brien (m. 1925) Ann Stevens (m. 1937–1943) June Howard (m. 1945)
- Children: 4, including George Hamilton

George "Spike" Hamilton (January 13, 1901– March 31, 1957) was a popular bandleader and songwriter who led a band based at the Biltmore Hotel in Los Angeles. Among the musicians in the band were Ray Robbins, Spike Jones, and Leighton Noble.

Born in Newport, Vermont, as George William Hamilton, the son of Dr. Harry Hamilton, a dentist. His family owned a store in Newport that was founded by his mother's father in 1859. He studied violin as a child, attended local schools in Newport and graduated from Dartmouth College in 1923. While at Dartmouth he organized a dance orchestra, later known as the Barbary Coast Orchestra. After leaving Dartmouth his orchestra played in Chicago and then in Atlantic City at the Million Dollar Pier. In the early 1930s he began recording with Rudy Vallee and George White's Scandals.

His first song, "Bye Bye, Pretty Baby" was published in 1927. Other songs included "Betty Co-ed", "I'll Never Forget", "Somebody Nobody Loves", and "What Am I Supposed to Do."

Hamilton appeared in the movie Gift of Gab (1934), and in the short film Sunday Night at the Trocadero (1937).

His first wife was Patricia O'Brien, whom he married in February 1925. In 1937 he married Ann Stevens, formerly Mrs. William Potter, with whom he had two sons, David Hamilton and actor George Hamilton. That marriage lasted until 1943. Early in 1945 he married June Howard, who was a singer in his band. In his actor son's 2008 memoir, Don't Mind if I Do, George Hamilton said that he had sexual relations with June Howard, then his stepmother, at the age of 12, and then years later when he was an adult.

Hamilton returned to New York in 1944 and in his final years worked in sales in the perfume industry. He died in his apartment in New York City on March 31, 1957. At the time of his death he was sales director of Evyan Parfums Inc. He was survived by four children and a brother. He was buried at a cemetery in Newport.
