= Corruption (1933 film) =

1933 film

- Directed by: Charles E. Roberts
- Written by: Charles E. Roberts (original story and screenplay)
- Produced by: William Berke (producer)
- Cinematography: Robert E. Cline
- Edited by: Arthur Cohen
- Release date: June 19, 1933
- Running time: 67 minutes
- Country: United States
- Language: English

Corruption is a 1933 American Pre-Code film directed by Charles E. Roberts and starring Evalyn Knapp and Preston Foster. The film is also known as Double Exposure in the United Kingdom.

== Plot ==
Tim Butler is elected Mayor of a city known for corruption, unfortunately, he is elected by those who are corrupt. Butler is set up and removed from office, to only be convicted of killing Regan, a major member of the political machine. Butler is helped by his loyal assistant, Ellen and is eventually exonerated.

== Cast ==
- Evalyn Knapp as Ellen Manning
- Preston Foster as Tim Butler
- Charles Delaney as Charlie Jasper
- Tully Marshall as Gorman
- Warner Richmond as Regan
- Huntley Gordon as District Attorney Blake
- Lane Chandler as Assistant District Attorney King
- Natalie Moorhead as Sylvia Gorman
- Mischa Auer as Volkov
- Jason Robards, Sr. as Police Commissioner
- Gwen Lee as Mae
- Sidney Bracey as Dr. Robbins
