= Ray Walker (actor) =

American actor (1904–1980)

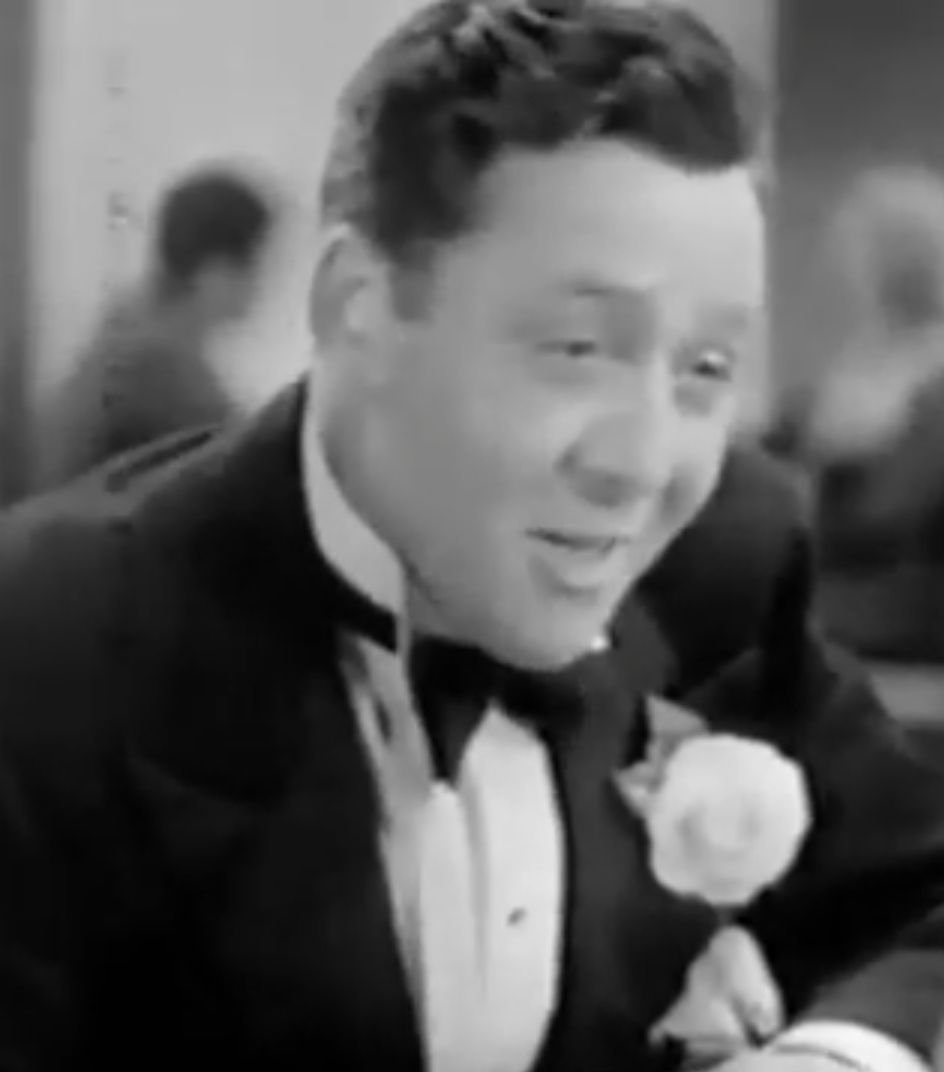
- Walker in Bulldog Edition (1936)
- Born: Warren Reynolds Walker; August 10, 1904; Newark, New Jersey, U.S.
- Died: October 6, 1980 (aged 76); Los Angeles, California, U.S.
- Occupation: Actor
- Years active: 1933–1964

Warren Reynolds "Ray" Walker (August 10, 1904 – October 6, 1980) was an American actor,

== Early life ==
Walker was born in Newark, New Jersey.

== Career ==
Walker starred in Baby Take a Bow (1934), Hideaway Girl (1936), The Dark Hour (1936), The Unknown Guest (1943) and It's A Wonderful Life (1946).

== Death ==
Ray Walker died in Los Angeles, California, on October 6, 1980, at age 76.

== Partial filmography ==
- Goodbye Love (1933) as Brooks
- Devil's Mate (1933) as Natural
- Skyway (1933) as Robert 'Flash' Norris
- He Couldn't Take It (1933) as Jimmy Case
- Million Dollar Baby (1934) as Terry Sweeney
- One Hour Late (1934) as Cliff Miller
- When Strangers Meet (1934) as Steve
- Happy Landing (1934) as Lt. Nick Terris
- Baby Take a Bow (1934) as Larry Scott
- The Loudspeaker (1934) as Joe Miller
- Thirty Day Princess (1934) as Dan Kirk
- City Limits (1934) as Jimmy Dugan
- The Fighting Coward (1935) as Bob Horton
- Music Is Magic (1935) as Jack Lambert
- The Girl Friend (1935) as Doc Parks
- Cappy Ricks Returns (1935) as Bill Peck
- Ladies Love Danger (1935) as Haskins
- $10 Raise (1935) as Perry aka $10 Raise
- Hideaway Girl (1936) as Freddie
- Bulldog Edition (1936) as Ken Dwyer
- The Crime Patrol (1936) as Bob Neal
- Brilliant Marriage (1936) as Garry Dane
- Laughing Irish Eyes (1936) as Eddie Bell
- The Dark Hour (1936) as Jim Landis
- It's Up to You (1936) as Sam Jones
- Big Town Girl (1937) as Norton (uncredited)
- Hot Water (1937) as Reporter (uncredited)
- Big City (1937) as Eddie Donogan - Independent Cab Driver (uncredited)
- Outlaws of the Orient (1937) as Lucky Phelps
- One Mile from Heaven (1937) as Mortimer (Buck) Atlas
- Angel's Holiday (1937) as Crandall
- Her Husband Lies (1937) as Maxie
- Crashing Through Danger (1938) as Torchy
- Swing That Cheer (1938) as Reporter (uncredited)
- Too Hot to Handle (1938) as Wally - Sound Mixer (uncredited)
- Letter of Introduction (1938) as Reporter (uncredited)
- The Crowd Roars (1938) as Photographer (uncredited)
- The Marines Are Here (1938) as Hogan
- Test Pilot (1938) as Pilot in Café (uncredited)
- The Marines Are Here (1938) as Hogan
- Missing Evidence (1939) as McBride
- The Forgotten Woman (1939) as Marty Larkin
- It's a Wonderful World (1939) as Newspaper Man at Ferry Landing (uncredited)
- Tell No Tales (1939) as 'Mac' Dell (uncredited)
- Broadway Serenade (1939) as Denny Madison (uncredited)
- Mr. Moto in Danger Island (1939) as Ambulance Intern (uncredited)
- Let Us Live (1939) as Drunken Reporter (uncredited)
- Pardon Our Nerve (1939) as Publicity Man (uncredited)
- Pirates of the Skies (1939) as Pilot Hal Weston
- Isle of Destiny (1940) as Cpl. Jones aka Jonesy Radio Man
- New Moon (1940) as Coco (uncredited)
- A Night at Earl Carroll's (1940) as Jerry
- It Started with Eve (1941) as Slim – Reporter (uncredited)
- Three Girls About Town (1941) as Reporter on Telephone (uncredited)
- Marry the Boss's Daughter (1941) as Elevator Operator (uncredited)
- Pittsburgh (1942) as Sutcliff (uncredited)
- My Heart Belongs to Daddy (1942) as Eddie Summers – Band Leader
- The Spirit of Stanford (1942) as Duke Connors (uncredited)
- Get Hep to Love (1942) as Gas Station Attendant (uncredited)
- Henry Aldrich, Editor (1942) as Jack Lewis
- Footlight Serenade (1942) as Reporter (uncredited)
- Almost Married (1942) as Blakeley
- House of Errors (1942) as Jerry Fitzgerald
- What's Cookin'? (1942) as Happy (uncredited)
- Captains of the Clouds (1942) as Mason
- The Lady Is Willing (1942) as Reporter (uncredited)
- Dr. Kildare's Victory (1942) as Taxi Driver with Injured Man (uncredited)
- Brooklyn Orchid (1942) as Orchestra Leader/Emcee
- Don't Get Personal (1942) as Pitchman
- Lost Angel (1943) as Trainer (uncredited)
- Swing Out the Blues (1943) as Announcer (uncredited)
- Swingtime Johnny (1944) as Mike
- Government Girl (1944) as Tom Holliday
- There's Something About a Soldier (1943) as Sports Writer (uncredited)
- Henry Aldrich Haunts a House (1943) as Detective Beamish (uncredited)
- Is Everybody Happy? (1943) as Lou Merwin
- Princess O'Rourke (1943) as G-Man
- The Unknown Guest (1943) as Swarthy
- Crazy House (1943) as Radio Host at Drive-In (uncredited)
- Hi'ya, Sailor (1943) as Headwaiter (uncredited)
- Captive Wild Woman (1943) as Ringmaster (uncredited)
- It's a Great Life (1943) as Salesman (uncredited)
- Mission to Moscow (1943) as Raymond - Davies' Butler (uncredited)
- He Hired the Boss (1943) as Salesman (uncredited)
- Dixie Dugan (1943) as Burns (uncredited)
- Hi'ya, Chum (1943) as Jackson
- The Amazing Mrs. Holliday (1943 as Chauffeur (uncredited)
- Rogues' Gallery (1944) as Jimmy Foster
- My Buddy (1944) as Russ
- Kansas City Kitty (1944) as Lawyer Simpson
- Maisie Goes to Reno (1944) as Bus Ticket Clerk
- Wing and a Prayer (1944) as Sailor assisting Projectionist
- South of Dixie (1944) as Newspaper Reporter
- Man from Frisco (1944) as Johnny Rogers
- Silent Partner (1944) as Reilly, the Drunk
- Stars on Parade (1944) as Billy Blake
- Jam Session (1944) as Fred Wylie
- Her Primitive Man (1944) as Radio Announcer (uncredited)
- Hat Check Honey (1944) as Gabby Post
- Life with Blondie (1945) as Anthony – Apex Photographer (uncredited)
- She Wouldn't Say Yes (1945) as Doctor (uncredited)
- Secrets of a Sorority Girl (1945) as Whitney King
- Radio Stars on Parade (1945) as Phil Merivin (uncredited)
- Incendiary Blonde (1945) as Gus – Stage Manager (uncredited)
- Eve Knew Her Apples (1945) as George McGrew
- Patrick the Great (1945) as Orchestra Leader (uncredited)
- The Beast with Five Fingers (1946) as Mr. Miller
- It's a Wonderful Life (1946) as Joe (Luggage Shop)
- The Secret of the Whistler (1946) as Joseph Aloysius 'Joe' Conroy
- Sister Kenny (1946) as Doctor at Minneapolis Lecture (uncredited)
- Step by Step (1946) as Agent Jorgensen
- Earl Carroll Sketchbook (1946) as Agent Sammy Harris (uncredited)
- Boys' Ranch (1946) as Casey, Baseball Manager (uncredited)
- Dark Alibi (1946) as Danvers
- Crime of the Century (1946) as Jim Rogers
- Gay Blades (1946) as Bill Calhoun
- Because of Him (1946) as Daniels (uncredited)
- Girl on the Spot (1946) as Don Dawson (uncredited)
- Tars and Spars (1946) as Lt. Scully (uncredited)
- Magic Town (1947) as Stinger's Associate (uncredited)
- The Unsuspected (1947) as Donovan's Assistant
- Robin Hood of Texas (1947) as Detective Lt. Lacey
- The Perils of Pauline (1947) as Armistice Day Set Technician (uncredited)
- That's My Man (1947) as Gambler (uncredited)
- That's My Gal (1947) as Danny Malone
- The Guilt of Janet Ames (1947) as Sidney (uncredited)
- The Pilgrim Lady (1947) as Blackie Reynolds
- The Return of October (1948) as Joe (uncredited)
- Apartment for Peggy (1948) as Carson (uncredited)
- Fighting Father Dunne (1948) as Fred Carver – Off-Screen Storyteller (uncredited)
- The Sainted Sisters (1948) as Abel Rivercomb
- April Showers (1948) as Mr. Barclay (uncredited)
- Black Bart (1948) as MacFarland
- Angels in Disguise (1949) as City Editor, Jim Cobb
- Mighty Joe Young (1949) as Reporter (uncredited)
- The Great Gatsby (1949) as Real Estate Man
- Blondie's Big Deal (1949) as Harry Slack
- Bodyhold (1949) as Prof. Weaver
- Pioneer Marshal (1949) as Harvey Masters
- Adam's Rib (1949) as Photographer (uncredited)
- Chinatown at Midnight (1949) as Sam Costa
- Oh, You Beautiful Doll (1949) as Box Office Attendant
- Song of Surrender (1949) as Auctioneer
- Holiday in Havana (1949) as Sam Keegan
- The House Across the Street (1949) as Lt. Forman (uncredited)
- Hunt the Man Down (1950) as Mac (uncredited)
- Revenue Agent (1950) as Lt. Bob Ullman
- Mr. Music (1950) as Master of Ceremonies (uncredited)
- Under Mexicali Stars (1950) as Robert B. Handley
- Southside 1-1000 (1950) as Secret Service Chemist (uncredited)
- Woman on the Run (1950) as Piano Player (uncredited)
- The Killer That Stalked New York (1950) as Wise Guy (uncredited)
- A Life of Her Own (1950) as Birthday Party Guest (uncredited)
- Sideshow (1950) as Sam Owen
- Hoedown (1950) as Knoxie (uncredited)
- Square Dance Katy (1950) as Businessman
- Captain Carey, U.S.A. (1950) as Mr. Simmons
- No Man of Her Own (1950) as Plainclothesman (uncredited)
- Joe Palooka Meets Humphrey (1950) as Lefty
- Superman and the Mole Men (1951) as John Craig
- Too Young to Kiss (1951) as New York Mail Reporter (uncredited)
- The Raging Tide (1951) as Neil (uncredited)
- Drums in the Deep South (1951) as Union Officer (uncredited)
- Let's Go Navy! (1951) as Lt. Bradley
- The Harlem Globetrotters (1951) as Jack Davis (uncredited)
- Skipalong Rosenbloom (1951) as TV Announcer
- M (1951) as Detective (uncredited)
- The Bad and the Beautiful (1952) as Cameraman (uncredited)
- No Holds Barred (1952) as Max, the Fake Reporter
- Battle Zone (1952) as Colonel (uncredited)
- The Las Vegas Story (1952) as Mary's Father (uncredited)
- The Fighter (1952) as Fan (uncredited)
- Boots Malone (1952) as Better (uncredited)
- Marry Me Again (1953) as Mac
- Clipped Wings (1953) as Sgt. Pete Whitney
- Roar of the Crowd (1953) as Tuffy Adams
- Rebel City (1953) as Col. Barnes
- The Homesteaders (1953) as Colonel Peterson
- The Blue Gardenia (1953) as Homer
- She's Back on Broadway (1953) as Beverly Hills Guide Bus Driver (uncredited)
- The Atomic Kid (1954) as Newspaperman
- Pride of the Blue Grass (1954) as Veterinarian
- Francis in the Navy (1955) as Auctioneer
- Jail Busters (1955) as Willie (uncredited)
- Sincerely Yours (1955) as Night Club Emcee/Band Leader
- Miracle in the Rain (1956) as Mr. McGuire, Salesman
- Somebody Up There Likes Me (1956) as Zale Ring Announcer
- Yaqui Drums (1956) as Sheriff
- Everything But the Truth (1956) as Doctor
- Hot Shots (1956) as Police Capt. W. K. Wells
- The Iron Sheriff (1957) as Bilson
- Kelly and Me (1957) as Bill Nevins
- Footsteps in the Night (1957) as McCleary
- The Spirit in St. Louis (1957) as Barker
- This Could Be the Night (1957) as Emcee at Cooking Contest
- The Space Children (1958) as Reporter Richard Lloyd
- Elmer Gantry (1960) as Salesman in Saloon
- Ten Who Dared (1960) as McSpalden
- Pepe (1960) as Wilder's Assistant Director
- Walk on the Wild Side (1962) as Salesman in Teresina Café
- Kisses for My President (1964) as Ray - Assistant TV Crew Producer
