= Speed Wings =

1934 film by Otto Brower

- Directed by: Otto Brower
- Starring: Tim McCoy, Evalyn Knapp, and William Bakewell
- Distributed by: Columbia Pictures
- Release date: February 5, 1934
- Running time: 61 minutes
- Country: United States
- Language: English

Speed Wings is a 1934 American Pre-Code action film directed by Otto Brower and starring Tim McCoy, Evalyn Knapp, and William Bakewell.
