= Jabberwock (magazine) =

British children's magazine

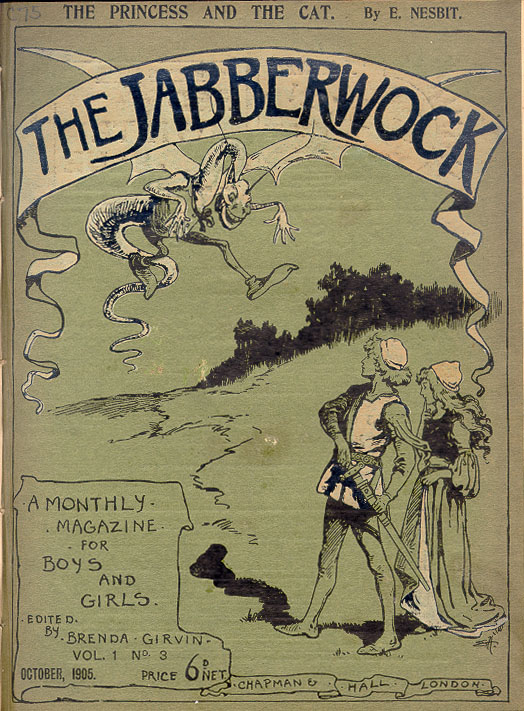
The cover of the October 1905 issue

Jabberwock: a Monthly Magazine for Boys and Girls was published in London by Chapman & Hall and edited by Brenda Girvin. Price 6d 1905–1907.

Originally The Jabberwock, the title became Our Jabberwock from August 1906 onwards.

Vol 1 No 3 (October 1905) contained The Princess and the Cat by E. Nesbit.

The First Issue of the magazine contained:

- The Little Marquis by Shiela Braine
- Stanley and the pigmies by Alice Corkran
- Wonderful Adventures by Robert Murray Gilchrist
- The Enchanted Garden by Netta Syrett
- Curious Shells by the Rev. T. Wood
