= Bulldog Edition =

1936 film by Charles Lamont

- Evalyn Knapp and Ray Walker, in Bulldog Edition (1936)
- Directed by: Charles Lamont
- Written by: Daniel Ahern (story "Back in Circulation"); Richard English (screenplay); Karen DeWolf (screenplay); Richard English (adaptation)
- Produced by: William Berke (supervising producer); Nat Levine (producer); Sol C. Siegel (associate producer)
- Starring: Evalyn Knapp; Ray Walker; Regis Toomey
- Cinematography: Jack A. Marta
- Edited by: Charles Craft
- Distributed by: Republic Pictures
- Release date: September 13, 1936
- Running time: 57 minutes 53 minutes (edited version)
- Country: United States
- Language: English

Bulldog Edition is a 1936 American crime drama film directed by Charles Lamont and starring Evalyn Knapp, Ray Walker and Regis Toomey. The film is also known as Lady Reporter in the United Kingdom.

== Plot ==
Newspaper editors Ken Dwyer and Evans compete for circulation, and the heart of star reporter/cartoonist Randy Burns. That is, if accused killer Nick Enright and his moll, “Aggie”, don't put them permanently out of circulation first.

== Cast ==
- Ray Walker as Ken Dwyer, Daily News Circulation Manager
- Evalyn Knapp as Randy Burns, Daily News Reporter / Cartoonist
- Regis Toomey as J. M. "Jim" Hardy, Daily News Managing Editor
- Cy Kendall as Nick Enright
- William Newell as Charlie Hunter, Daily News Reporter
- Oscar Apfel as Taggart, Daily News Publisher
- Betty Compson as Billie Blake, aka Aggie, Enright's Moll
- Robert Warwick as Evans, Post Publisher
- Ivan Miller as C.C. Johns, Post Managing Editor
- Matty Fain as Henchman Maxie
- George Lloyd as Manelli, Racket Man
