= The Girl's Realm =

British girls' magazine, 1898–1915

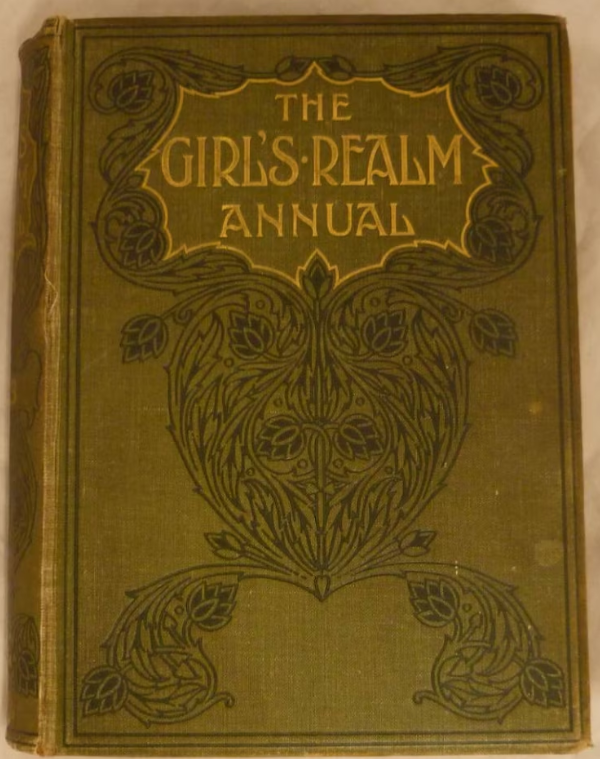
The Girl's Realm's 1913 Annual

The Girl's Realm was a sixpenny monthly magazine, published by Hutchinson that ran for seventeen volumes from November 1898 to November 1915. (Note: Muddiman has the magazine as launching in 1898 and being in progress, that is, still in publication in 1920. However he also lists Girl's Realm with the first issue on 29 February 1908, and the final issue on 27 February 1915, at which stage it was combined with Our Girls.)

== Publishing history ==
In August 1898 it was announced that Hutchinson was to launch a magazine for young gentlewomen which would "reflect everything of interest to girlhood" and be up-to-date, bright, amusing, interesting and instructive. The new magazine was intended to be a companion to The Lady's Realm, also owned by Hutchinson, which had been launched in 1896.

The first issue of The Girl's Realm was published in November 1898 with the Irish journalist and children's author Alice Corkran as both a contributor and editor. The first edition had 140 illustrations and 25 articles printed on art paper and was well reviewed. The Daily News of 26 October 1898 stated the issue

- far out-distances anything of the kind hitherto offered – World
- The variety in this number is extraordinary. ... The public reflects great credit on all concerned in its production... – Daily News:
- appears to mix all the desirable ingredients of a girl's reading in happy proportion. – Queen

Other reviewers were similarly positive:

- We have read this new venture and can most cordially recommend it – Elgin Courant, and Morayshire Advertiser.
- ... a very promising initial number – Bristol Mercury

The first edition offered "many valuable prizes" including two Swift bicycles (worth £50 the pair) a Singer Sewing machine (worth £16) and other prizes. One of the competitions was for the translation into English, from French, of a story by Madame Darmesteter.

Corkran was the editor for three years, resigning in early 1902 but remained involved with the magazine as a contributor and as the founder and guiding spirit of the Guild of Service and Good Fellowship. Another source credits her as the editor until 1915,

The magazine ceased to be an independent publication in 1915. Several other women's journals closed at the same time including The Lady's Realm (November 1896 – October 1914), the 'parent' of Girl's Realm, Hearth and Home (1891–1914), and Young Woman (1892–1915). The Girl's Realm was bought in 1915 and combined with Woman at Home to become Woman at Home and Girl's Realm, and in 1917 it was jointly owned by George Newnes and Hodder and Stoughton. The reason for the merger was the paper shortage in World War I. Given the focus of the magazine on modern girlhood outside the home, it must have been a difficult fit with Woman at Home.

== Audience ==
The Girl's realm differed from earlier magazines that targeted middle-class girls. It was self consciously modern and promoted education, modern pastimes such as photography and physical activity for girls. It encouraged girls to do things beyond the domestic sphere with regular features on girl's schools, sport, and modern hobbies. The magazine established itself as a thoroughly modern publication from its inception.

In A Chat with the Girl of the Period in Volume 1 of the magazine (Note: Probably January or February 1899, as it was on page 216 of the volume.) Alice Corcoran defined here audience when she wrote to her readers that the modern girl is tired of being taken to see her brother play football, she wants to kick at it herself ... is tired of living in a doll's house ... will never take a back seat ... claims that she has as much right to a good education as her brothers ...wants to lead a professional life.

Class was always an underlying issue. The Bristol Mercury complained of the first issue that it was absurd for one writer to talk of a girl of 17 being given a dress allowance of £100 as this would not be typical of the intended readership.

== The 1901 competition ==
On the third anniversary of the magazine Corkran launched a competition for which the first prize was a Swift bicycle (worth £22). Readers had to cut out a coupon and send it in with their vote for whichever of 14 women they considered to be their favourite character. When the magazine got their vote, they sent out a further 25 coupons so the reader could canvass for more votes among other girls that they knew: the object of the competition was to introduce the magazine to as many potential readers as possible. All girls who submitted 25 votes got a small silver charm. The winner of the competition, A. Mary Field, of Highgate, had collected 3,242 votes, through working via a network of headmistresses of girls' schools. The magazine was so pleased with the success of the competition they added another 19 consolation prizes to the 34 prizes initially advertised, so every girl who collected over 400 votes would be rewarded.

In all, 2,876 girls participated in the competition and between them they submitted over 300,000 votes. The 14 characters covered a broad range of endeavours.

Results of the Girl's Realm voting competition.
	Character	No of Girls	as %	No. Votes	as %
1	Florence Nightingale. the founder of modern nursing.	1,180	41.03%	120,776	40.17%
2	Grace Darling. the lighthouse keepers daughter who rowed out with her father to rescue people from shipwreck.	651	22.64%	67,609	22.49%
3	Joan of Arc. the Maid of Orléans, a French hero of the Hundred Years' War	576	20.03%	62,803	20.89%
4	Flora MacDonald. who helped Bonnie Prince Charlie evade capture after the Battle of Culloden.	122	4.24%	11,947	3.97%
5	Elizabeth Fry. the Quaker and prison reformer.	81	2.82%	7,504	2.50%
6	Alice Ayres. a nursemaid who died after rescuing her charges from a fire.	49	1.70%	5,103	1.70%
7	Frances Mary Buss. a pioneer of women's education	38	1.32%	6,142	2.04%
8	Lady Hallé. a virtuoso violinist, chamber musician, and teacher.	34	1.18%	4,064	1.35%
9	Harriet Beecher Stowe. the American abolitionist and author of Uncle Tom's Cabin.	33	1.15%	3,941	1.31%
10	Rosa Bonheur. a French artist, widely consider to be the most famous female painter of the 19th century	32	1.11%	3,082	1.03%
11	Jenny Lind. a popular Swedish opera singer.	28	0.97%	2,948	0.98%
12	Mrs Siddons. the Welsh-born English actress, the best-known tragedienne of the 18th century.	21	0.73%	1,876	0.62%
13	Elizabeth Barrett Browning. an English poet who married the poet and playwright Robert Browning.	19	0.66%	1,768	0.59%
14	Baroness Burdett-Coutts. one of the wealthiest women in England who spent most of her wealth on philanthropy.	12	0.42%	1,098	0.37%
15	Total	2,876		300,661	

== The Girl's Realm Guild ==
One of the innovations of the magazine was the magazine's Guild of Service and Good Fellowship. The guild was founded in April 1900 by Alice Corkran and charged a nominal subscription to members. The guild supported a cot at the Ormond Street Hospital for Sick Children, and also provided a scholarship to the Royal College of Music. Other activities included providing Christmas treats, one in Bethnal Green for 117 children and one in Kensal Green for 360 children, with the Guild members themselves providing the presents. The guild had over 2,300 members by 1905.

Fund-raising events included tableaux vivant at Covent Garden in 1909, opened by the Duchess of Connaught and featuring Royal personages in the tableaux. In 1911 the Guild was fundraising for the King Edward Memorial Cottage where girl workers of gentle birth and limited means could take a holiday, either as invited guests or by paying a small contribution. By 1912, the Guild's trust fund was said to be distributing £450 annually and that more than 100 girls had benefited. The objective of the trust was not said to be that of assisting needy girls of gentle birth to acquire a profession al training.

The Guild survived the closure of the magazine, and fund-raising continued, including a Gilbert and Sullivan Bazaar at the Royal Horticultural Hall, Vincent Square on 26 and 27 November 1920. The same venue was the scene of another fundraiser All in a Garden Fair on 22 and 23 November 1922. The Girl's Realm Guild office was at 2 Harrington Gardens in 1928, when it was selling tickets for the revival of L'Enfant Prodique, a French mime play, presumably a fund-raising event.
