= Blonde from Brooklyn =

1945 film directed by Del Lord

- Lobby card
- Directed by: Del Lord
- Screenplay by: Erna Lazarus
- Produced by: Ted Richmond; Irving Briskin
- Starring: Bob Haymes; Lynn Merrick; Thurston Hall; Mary Treen
- Cinematography: Burnett Guffey
- Edited by: Jerome Thoms
- Production company: Columbia Pictures
- Distributed by: Columbia Pictures
- Release date: June 21, 1945
- Running time: 65 minutes
- Country: United States
- Language: English

Blonde from Brooklyn is a 1945 American musical comedy film directed by Del Lord and starring Bob Haymes, Lynn Merrick, Thurston Hall, and Mary Treen. The film was released by Columbia Pictures on June 21, 1945.

== Plot ==
Returning soldier Dixon Harper meets cute with promising radio singer Susan Parker. Susan is mistaken for an heiress to a southern plantation by blustery colonel Farnsworth and she ignores wise cracking friend Diane to see the ruse through.

== Cast ==
- Bob Haymes as Dixon Harper (as Robert Stanton)
- Lynn Merrick as Susan Parker aka Susanna Bellwithers
- Thurston Hall as 'Colonel' Hubert Farnsworth
- Mary Treen as Diane Peabody
- Eddie Bartell as Ricky Lester (uncredited)
- Hugh Beaumont as Lieutenant (uncredited)
- Carlyle Blackwell Jr. as Serviceman (uncredited)
- Chester Clute as Mr. Weams (uncredited)
- Dick Curtis as Soldier (uncredited)
- Myrtle Ferguson as Miss Quackenfish (uncredited)
- Byron Foulger as Harvey (uncredited)
- Chuck Hamilton as Reporter (uncredited)
- Tom Hanlon as Announcer (uncredited)
- Hugh Hooker as Serviceman (uncredited)
- Marilyn Johnson as WAC (uncredited)
- John Kelly as Bartender (uncredited)
- Arthur Loft as Daniel Frazier (uncredited)
- Anne Loos as Secretary (uncredited)
- Robert Love as Serviceman (uncredited)
- Alphonse Martell as Maitre'd (uncredited)
- William Newell as Waiter (uncredited)
- Leighton Noble as Leighton Noble, Orchestra Leader (uncredited)
- Joe Palma as Reporter (uncredited)
- Bert Roach as Drunk (uncredited)
- Wally Rose as Serviceman (uncredited)
- Walter Soderling as W. Wilson Wilbur (uncredited)
- Brick Sullivan as Reporter (uncredited)
- LeRoy Taylor as Sailor (uncredited)
- Gwen Verdon as Girl in Nightclub (uncredited)
- Regina Wallace as Mrs. Frazier (uncredited)
- Matt Willis as Curtis Rossmore (uncredited)
- Dick Winslow as Orchestra Leader (uncredited)
