= Evalyn Knapp =

American actress (1906–1981)

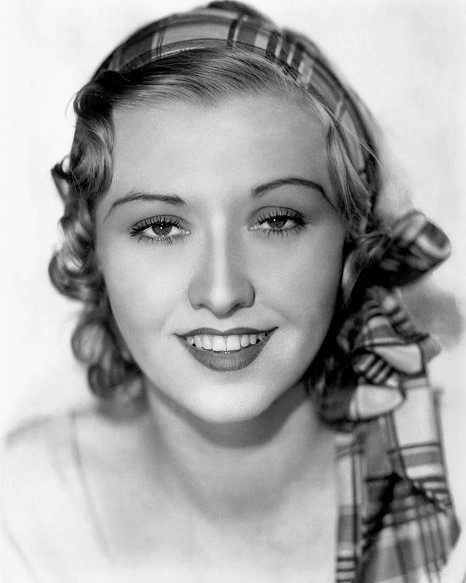
- Knapp in 1932
- Born: Evelyn Pauline Knapp; June 17, 1906; Kansas City, Missouri, U.S.
- Died: June 12, 1981 (aged 74); Los Angeles, California, U.S.
- Occupation: Actress
- Years active: 1929–1943
- Spouse: Dr. George A. Snyder (1934–1977; his death)

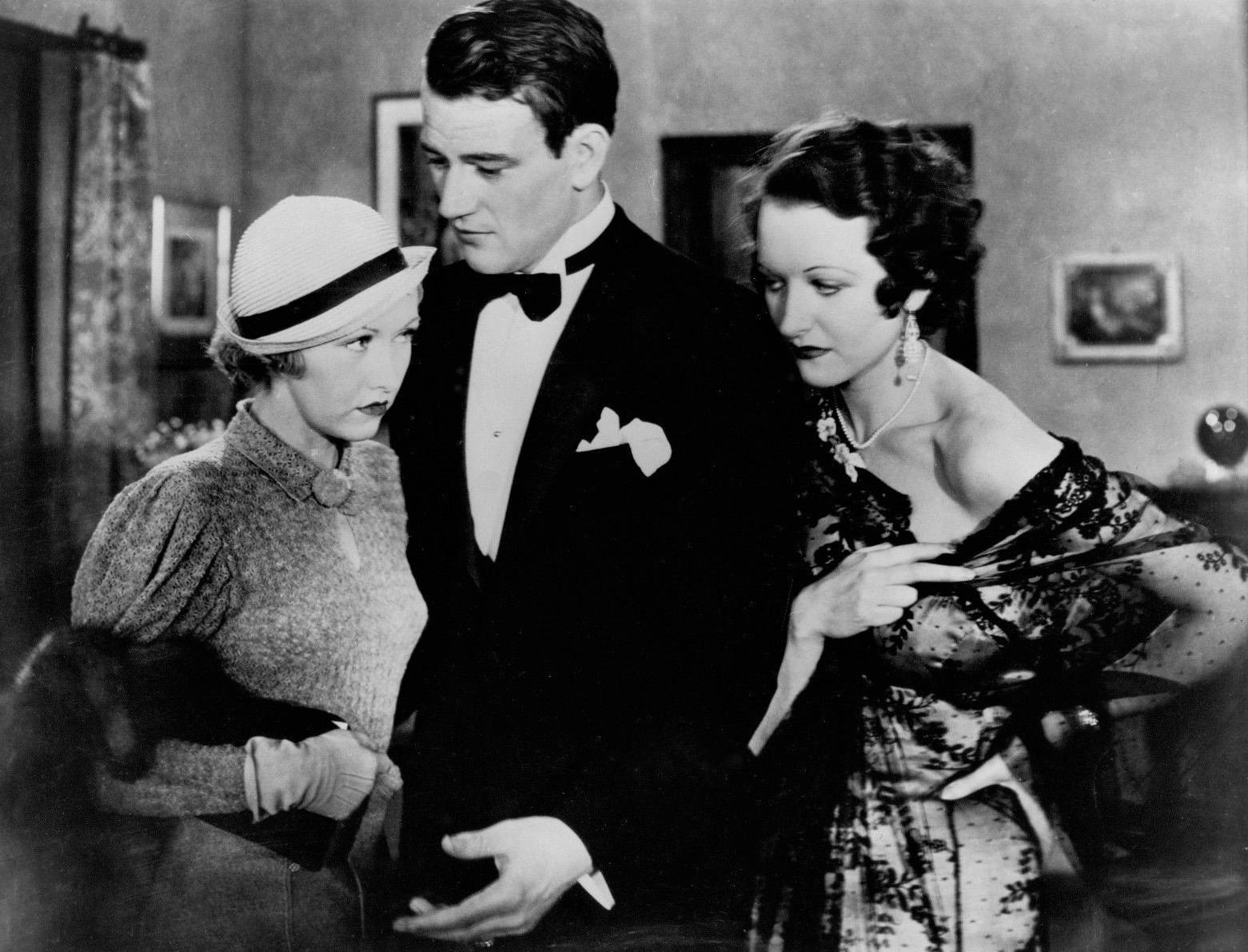
Knapp, John Wayne and Natalie Kingston in His Private Secretary (1933)

Evalyn Knapp (born Evelyn Pauline Knapp; June 17, 1906 – June 12, 1981) was an American film actress of the late 1920s, 1930s and into the 1940s. She was a leading B-movie serial actress in the 1930s. She was the younger sister of the orchestra leader Orville Knapp.

== Early years ==
Knapp was born in Kansas City, the daughter of Mr. and Mrs. S. D. Knapp. As a student at Central High School in Kansas City, in 1926 she was the sponsor major of the school's cadet corps, "one of the outstanding honors that Kansas City high schools offer their girl students".

When Knapp was 16 years old, two strangers helped her to avoid serious injury when a sparkler ignited a fire in her dress. Two motorcyclists saw it happen as they were passing. They stopped, and one called a doctor while the other wrapped his coat around her and rolled her on the ground to put the flames out.

Knapp's early experience in drama occurred with junior college theatrical productions and a local stock theater company. When the company's manager told her that she would have to lose her Midwestern accent if she wanted to progress in acting, she moved to New York. With no funding from her family, she painted hundreds of Christmas cards to earn the money needed to travel and to live there. In New York she stayed away from performing while she studied dramatics and enunciation for six months,

== Career ==
Before Knapp went to Hollywood she acted on stage, including performing in road companies of Billie Moore, Broadway, Mrs. Money Penny, and The Patsy, and she made 29 short films, primarily two-reel comedies, for Vitaphone. She started acting in silent films, her first role being in the 1929 film At the Dentist's. She was cast as leading lady in Smart Money in 1931, the only film starring both Edward G. Robinson and James Cagney. In 1932, Knapp was one of 14 girls, along with Ginger Rogers and Gloria Stuart, selected as WAMPAS Baby Stars.

In 1931, Knapp spent several months in a hospital after she fell from a cliff during a hike with her brother, Orville. Two vertebrae were fractured. Although she was ready to resume her career four months after the fall, she encountered doubts from film executives. In 1935 she said, "But it is only recently that I can walk into a producer's office without getting that solicitious, questioning look that says, 'I think you could do the part all right, but — do you really think you're strong enough?'"

She achieved success in cliffhanger serials, which were popular at the time. She played the title character in the 1933 serial The Perils of Pauline. The same year, she starred, with top billing, alongside 26-year-old John Wayne in His Private Secretary, a light comedy in which Wayne portrays a playboy determined to win her over. She also appeared in Corruption that year opposite Preston Foster. One of her better known film roles was opposite Ken Maynard in the 1934 film In Old Santa Fe featuring Gene Autry in his first screen appearance, in which he sang with a bluegrass band.

She worked through 1941, but her career slowed afterward. In 1943, she played her last role, uncredited, in Two Weeks to Live, one of the Lum and Abner films starring Chester Lauck and Norris Goff.

== Personal life ==
Knapp married Dr. George A. Snyder in 1934. He was the physician who treated her for injuries resulting from her fall.

== Death ==
Knapp died on June 12, 1981 of heart disease at St. Vincent's Hospital in Los Angeles, California, five days before her 75th birthday. Her death was not widely reported at the time. She was cremated and her ashes were buried at sea.

== Partial filmography ==
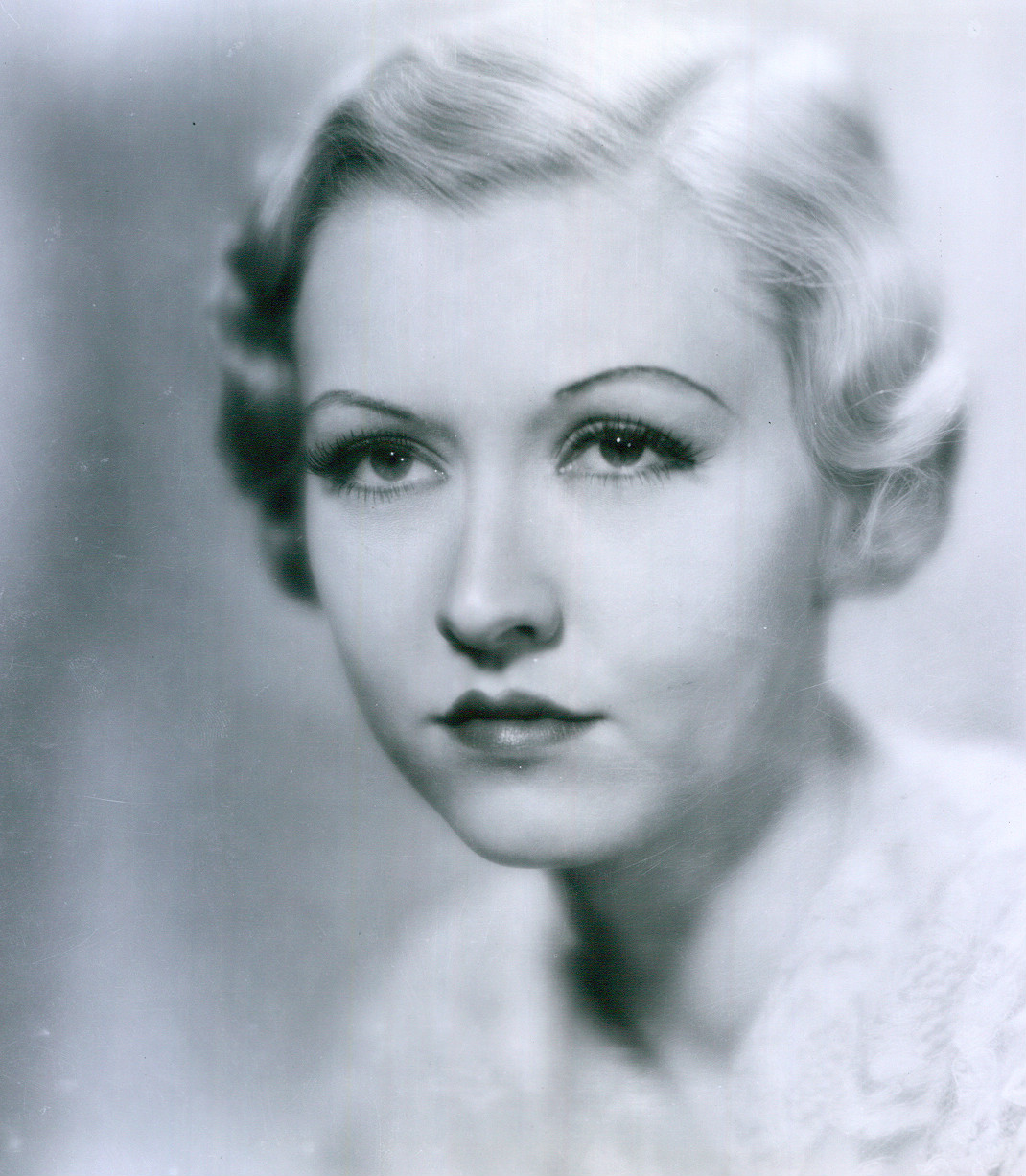
Evalyn Knapp in 1934.

- At the Dentist's (1929)
- Sinners' Holiday (1930) – Jennie Delano
- River's End (1930) – Miriam McDowell
- Mothers Cry (1930) – Jenny Williams
- 50 Million Frenchmen (1931) – Miss Wheeler-Smith
- The Millionaire (1931) – Barbara Alden
- Smart Money (1931) – Irene Graham
- The Bargain (1931) – Vorencia
- Side Show (1931) – Irene
- Taxi! (1931) – Actress in Movie Clip (uncredited)
- High Pressure (1932) – Helen Wilson
- Strange Marriage (1932) – Evalyn Knapp with Jason Robards Sr.
- Fireman, Save My Child (1932) – Sally Toby
- The Strange Love of Molly Louvain (1932) – Doris
- Madame Racketeer (1932) – Alice Hicks
- The Vanishing Frontier (1932) – Carol Winfield
- The Night Mayor (1932) – Doree Dawn
- Big City Blues (1932) – Jo-Jo (uncredited)
- This Sporting Age (1932) – Mickey Steele
- A Successful Calamity (1932) – Peggy Wilton
- Slightly Married (1932) – Mary Smith
- Bachelor Mother (1932) – Mary Somerset
- Corruption (1933) - Evalyn Knapp with Preston Foster
- Air Hostess (1933) – Kitty King
- State Trooper (1933) – June Brady
- His Private Secretary (1933) – Marion Hall
- Corruption (1933) – Ellen Manning
- Dance Girl Dance (1933) – Sally Patter
- Police Car 17 (1933) – Helen Regan
- The Perils of Pauline (1933, Serial) – Pauline Hargrave
- Speed Wings (1934) – Mary Stuart
- A Man's Game (1934) – Judy Manners
- In Old Santa Fe (1934) – Lila Miller
- One Frightened Night (1935) – Fake Doris Waverly
- Ladies Crave Excitement (1935) – Wilma Howell
- Confidential (1935) – Maxine Travers
- The Fire Trap (1935) – Betty Marshall
- Laughing Irish Eyes (1936) – Peggy Kelly
- Three of a Kind (1936) – Barbara Penfield
- Bulldog Edition (1936) – Randy Burns
- Hawaiian Buckaroo (1938) – Paula Harrington
- Rawhide (1938) – Peggy Gehrig
- Wanted by the Police (1938) – Kathleen Murphy
- Idiot's Delight (1939) – Nurse #4 (uncredited)
- Mr. Smith Goes to Washington (1939) – Reporter Asking 'What Do You Think of the Girls in This Town?' (uncredited)
- Sauce for the Gander (1940) – Secretary
- Girl in 313 (1940) – Arrested Girl
- The Lone Wolf Takes a Chance (1941) – Evelyn Jordan
- Roar of the Press (1941) – Evelyn
- Two Weeks to Live (1943) – Miss Morris, Dr. O'Brien's Secretary (uncredited) (final film role)
