= Netta Syrett =

English writer (1865–1943)

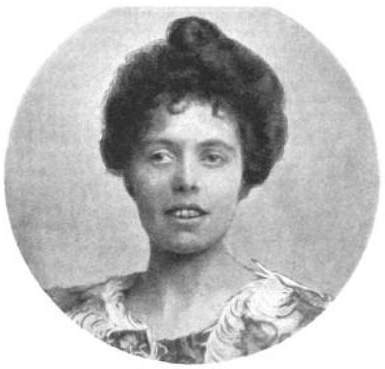
- In The Sketch, 30 October 1901
- Born: Janet Syrett; 17 March 1865; Ramsgate, Kent
- Died: 15 December 1943 (aged 78); London
- Education: Hughes Hall, Cambridge
- Relatives: Grant Allen (uncle)
- Writing career
- Period: 1890–1940
- Notable work: The Victorians (1915)
- Movements: Realism; New Woman

Netta Syrett (17 March 1865 – 15 December 1943) was an English writer of the late Victorian period whose novels featured New Woman protagonists. Her novel Portrait of a Rebel was adapted into the 1936 film A Woman Rebels.

== Biography ==
=== Early life and education ===
Netta Syrett was born Janet Syrett on 17 March 1865 in Ramsgate, Kent. She was one of five daughters (of thirteen children) born to silk merchant Ernest Syrett (d.1906) and Mary Ann, née Stembridge (d.1923) and the niece of writer Grant Allen. Three of her sisters, Nellie Syrett (born 1882) Kate Syrett (born 1872) and Mabel Syrett (1871–1961), were artists, designers and illustrators. First educated at home by their mother and a German governess, Syrett left home at age 11 to attend North London Collegiate School. She continued her education at Hughes Hall, Cambridge where she completed the three years' coursework necessary for a full teaching certificate in one year.

=== Career ===
Syrett taught for two years at a school in Swansea before accepting a post at the London Polytechnic School for Girls. Through her friend and coworker Mabel Beardsley, Netta met Aubrey Beardsley, Mabel's brother, and through him she was introduced to Henry Harland and included in his circle of friends. Harland published three of her short stories in The Yellow Book. Her sisters Nellie Syrett and Mabel Syrett also contributed to The Yellow Book.

Syrett's first novel, Nobody's Fault (1896), was published by The Bodley Head in their Keynotes series. Her writing and teaching careers coincided until 1902, when her play The Finding of Nancy received negative attention after Clement Scott, writing for The Daily Telegraph (9 May 1902), insinuated that the play was thinly disguised autobiography. Syrett was asked to resign her teaching position after a student's mother read Scott's review. By that time, novel writing had become for her "a sure thing" and Syrett continued to turn out a novel per year until retiring in 1939.

=== Death ===
Syrett died in London on 15 December 1943 following a long illness.

== Published works ==
=== Novels ===
- Nobody's Fault (London: John Lane The Bodley Head, 1896)
- The Tree of Life (London: John Lane The Bodley Head, 1897)
- Rosanne (1902)
- The Day's Journey (1905; Chicago: A.C. McClurg, 1906)
- Woman of Circumstance (1906)
- The Child of Promise (1907)
- Anne Page (1908; New York: John Lane, 1909)
- A Castle of Dreams (1909)
- Olivia L. Carew (London: Chatto & Windus, 1910)
- Drender's Daughter (1911)
- Three Women (1912)
- Barbara of the Thorn (1913)
- The Jam Queen (1914)
- The Victorians (1915; republished as Rose Cottingham)
- Rose Cottingham Married (1916)
- Troublers of the Peace (1917)
- The Wife of a Hero (1918)
- The God of Chance (1920)
- One of Three (1921)
- Lady Gem (London: Hutchinson & Co, 1923; US title: Cupid and Mr. Pepys)
- Path to the Sun (1923)
- The House in Garden Square (London: Hutchinson & Co, n.d., 1924)

- As the Stars Come Out (1925)
- The Mystery of Jenifer (London: Hutchinson & Co, 1926)
- Julian Carroll (London: Hutchinson & Co, n.d., 1928)
- The Shuttles of Eternity (1928)
- Portrait of a Rebel (London: Geoffrey Bles, November 1929)
- Strange Marriage (1931)
- The Manor House (London: Geoffrey Bles, January 1932; US title: Moon Out of the Sky, 1932; reprinted as The Manor House by R. & L. Locker, n.d., c.1944-1954)
- Who was Florriemay? (1932)
- Aunt Elizabeth (1933)
- The House That Was (London: Rich & Cowan Ltd, 1933)
- Girls of the Sixth Form (1934)
- Judgment Withheld (1934)
- Linda (1935)
- Angel Unawares (London: Geoffrey Bles, 1936)
- The Farm on the Downs (London: Geoffrey Bles, 1936)
- Fulfilment (London: Geoffrey Bles, 1938)
- ...As Dreams Are Made On (1939)
- Gemini (1940)

=== Plays ===
- The Finding of Nancy (1902)
- Two Domestics (1922)
- Two Elizabeths (1924)

=== Short stories ===
- "That Dance at the Robsons" (Longman’s Magazine, April 1890)
- "Sylvia" (Macmillan's Magazine, June 1891)
- "Thy Heart's Desire" (The Yellow Book, Volume II, July 1894)
- "A Correspondence" (The Yellow Book, Volume VII, October 1895)
- "Her Wedding Day" (The Quarto, 1896)
- "Fairy-Gold" (Temple Bar, Vol. 109, October 1896)
- "Far Above Rubies" (The Yellow Book, Volume XII, January 1897)
- "Chiffon" (The Pall Mall Magazine, September 1900)
- "A Revelation in Arcadia" (Harper's, August 1902)
- "Poor Little Mrs. Villiers" (Venture, 1903)
- "An Idealist" (Harper's, May 1903)
- "Blue Roses" (1903; reprinted in The Mammoth Book of Fairy Tales, 1997)
- "The Enchanted Garden" (The Jabberwock, August 1905)
- "Madame de Meline" (Acorn, October 1905)
- "The Street of the Four Winds" (The Jabberwock, May 1906)
- The Endless Journey and Other Stories (1912) Contents: "The endless journey", "One solution", "The passing of a hero", "The real facts", "Miss Cordelia", "A change of view", "An unknown quantity", "A living ghost", "The 'better dream' of Hans Bergmann", "The impossible portrait".

=== Children's books ===
- The Garden of Delight: Fairy Tales (1898)
- The Magic City and Other Fairy Tales (1903)
- Six Fairy Plays for Children (1904)
- The Dream Garden (1905)
- The Hidden Country (1907)
- The Castle of Four Towers (1908)
- The Vanishing Princess, London: David Nutt, n.d. [1909]
- The Old Miracle Plays of England [retold as stories for children], London: A. R. Mowbray & Co., 1911

- Stories from Mediaeval Romance (1913)
- Godmother's Garden (1918)
- Robin Goodfellow and Other Fairy Plays for Children (1918)
- Toby and the Odd Beasts (1921)
- Rachel and the Seven Wonders (1921)
- The Fairy Doll and Other Plays for Children (1922)
- Magic London (1922)
- Tinkelly Winkle (1923)
- The Magic Castle, London: Geoffrey Bles, November 1925. Illustrated by Myrtle Fasken.

=== Other works ===
- The Story of Saint Catherine of Siena (London: A.R. Mowbray & Co., 1910)
- Sketches of European History (1931)
- The Sheltering Tree (autobiography, 1939)
