= Slightly Married =

1932 film

- Directed by: Richard Thorpe
- Written by: Mary McCarthy
- Produced by: George R. Batcheller
- Starring: Evalyn Knapp; Walter Byron; Marie Prevost
- Cinematography: M.A. Anderson
- Edited by: Roland D. Reed
- Music by: Lee Zahler
- Production company: Invincible Pictures
- Distributed by: Chesterfield Motion Pictures Corporation
- Release date: October 15, 1932
- Running time: 65 minutes
- Country: United States
- Language: English

Slightly Married, also known as Strange Marriage, is a 1932 American pre-Code romantic comedy film directed by Richard Thorpe and starring Evalyn Knapp, Walter Byron and Marie Prevost.

== Plot ==
Drunk upper-class Jimmy Martin saves complete stranger Mary Smith from being sent to jail by backing up her story that she was waiting for a man who was going to marry her when she was arrested at a street corner. The suspicious judge offers to unite them on the spot, but Jimmy takes him up on it. When he sobers up, he falls in love with her, despite already having a fiancée. When his mother finds out, she threatens to have his income cut off (he will not gain control of his fortune for two years). This causes a misunderstanding. Jimmy comes to believe that Mary was interested only in his money when Mary offers to let him out of the marriage, whereas she has really fallen in love with him and merely has his best interests at heart.

== Cast ==
- Evalyn Knapp as Mary Smith
- Walter Byron as Jimmy Martin
- Marie Prevost as Nellie Gordon
- Jason Robards Sr. as Jack Haines
- Dorothy Christy as Marjorie Reynolds
- Clarissa Selwynne as Mrs. Martin
- Phillips Smalley as Mr. Martin
- Herbert Evans as Hodges
- Robert Ellis as Brandon
- Lloyd Ingraham as Judge
- Mary Foy as Landlady
- Al Bridge as Tenant
- Bobby Burns as Minister
- Allan Cavan as Banker
- Jack Pennick as Sailor

== Bibliography ==
- Pitts, Michael R. Poverty Row Studios, 1929-1940. McFarland & Company, 2005.
