= The Lady's Realm =

British women's magazine

- Vol. 9, no. 54 of The Lady's Realm (1901)
- Editor: William Henry Wilkins (1896–1902)
- First issue: November 1896
- Final issue: October 1914, possibly 1915
- Country: United Kingdom
- Language: English

The Lady's Realm was a British women's magazine published from 1896 until 1914, possibly until 1915. It primarily targeted upper-class readers as well as an aspirational middle-class audience, featuring photographs, poems, fiction, and columns by popular authors such as Marie Corelli, Frances Hodgson Burnett, Jack London, and H. G. Wells. The London Season was regularly covered, with visuals of significant society figures and débutantes appearing. Fashion trends in Paris and London were frequently discussed as well, particularly by its fashion editor Marian Pritchard.

The publication's targeted reader was the "New Woman", with enlightened ideas on education, health, independence, and employment. More successful than many of its contemporary publications, the magazine sold reasonably well in the United States, the United Kingdom, and Canada. It was a staple of women's reading rooms in public libraries, which were widespread across the UK. Relatively little is known of The Lady's Realm's publishing history, as many records were destroyed during the London Blitz. Its end may have been due to the First World War.

== History ==
Relatively little is known of The Lady's Realm's publishing history, as many records of its publisher, Hutchinson, were destroyed during the London Blitz. The first issue was published in November 1896. Its first editor was William Henry Wilkins, a mildly successful novelist who oversaw the publication's editing until 1902. Though inexperienced, Wilkins was acquainted with society, being a friend of such figures as the explorer Richard Francis Burton and his wife Isabel Burton. After Wilkins' death in 1905, The Lady's Realm wrote of how "the general public are little aware how much of [the magazine's] early success" was due to him, and that "not a few [contributors who] have since made their names in the world of letters have to thank him for placing their foot on the first rung of the ladder". Wilkins' successor as editor is unknown, though Margaret Versteeg and colleagues, who produced an index of the fiction published in The Lady's Realm, detect no changes in editorial judgement in the magazine's tenure after 1902. While the publication mainly featured female writers and feminine topics, all of its editors, most likely, were men.

When it debuted, there were more than twenty-nine publications catering to women. Upon the publication of its first issue in 1896, Review of Reviews called it "one of the most popular of the magazines that have been started this year". The illustrated magazine was produced monthly and cost sixpence (cheap enough for middle-class readers). A typical issue contained 120 pages on quality glossy paper. It sold reasonably well in the United Kingdom, the United States, and Canada. The magazine was available in women's reading rooms in public libraries, locations that were well distributed across the United Kingdom.

The magazine was produced by the English printers Hazell, Watson and Viney. One of its owners, Walter Hazell, was a social reformer and supporter of women's suffrage. A successful firm, Hazell, Watson and Viney also produced the Woman's Signal and the Woman's Gazette, which featured female political and economic topics. The success of The Lady's Realm allowed it to remain published for eighteen years, much longer than many other contemporary women's periodicals. Thirty-six volumes were produced, from November 1896 to October 1914 (a final volume may have been released in 1915). It is not known why it ended, though Versteeg and her colleagues speculate that World War I may have been a cause, as was the case for other contemporary publications like Young Woman (1891–1914) and The Girl's Realm (1892–1915).

== Content ==
The magazine focused on an upmarket audience, targeting "aspirational middle-class and upper-class readers". It was also one of the first intended to appeal to the female homeowner. The Lady's Realm featured poems, engravings and photographs, as well as columns by popular authors like Marie Corelli, Frances Hodgson Burnett, Violet Fane, and Mary Elizabeth Braddon. Other authors included Jack London, H.G. Wells, and Mary Eleanor Wilkins Freeman. Fiction, in the form of short stories and serialisations, was released during the magazine's entire span and took up a sizable proportion in issues. A slightly higher percentage of these contributions were written by women. The type of fiction varied, from romances and domestic narratives to fantasies and sociopolitical stories. The publication's targeted reader was the "New Woman", with enlightened ideas on education, health, independence, and employment. Victorian scholar Kathryn Ledbetter notes that The Lady's Realm was "a handbook to the New Woman then being successfully marketed in popular novels... it provides many examples of this ideal in essays, illustrations, fiction, and poetry through the late 1890s".

Lady's Realm printed an assortment of Court and society news alongside articles on more daily tasks such as food, homemaking, and methods for female readers to earn money. It covered the London Season, displaying photographs of significant society figures and débutantes. It claimed to feature over 500 illustrations in each volume. Theatre was another regular topic of the magazine, as was fiction, poetry, and reports on fashion. The Lady's Realm's fashion editor Marian Pritchard regularly wrote articles on emerging fashions in London and Paris, and recommended locations where readers could buy them. While still featuring fashion and beauty, it also encouraged careers for women in music, art, business, and millinery. The magazine maintained this blend of topics relatively consistently, though it gradually made minor changes to the proportion it focused on different topics, for instance later focusing less on the nobility and more on the lives of clergymen and governors general.

The Lady's Realm was a source of celebrity journalism. Ledbetter writes that the magazine inherited its "notions of feminine celebrity" from The Woman's World, an earlier publication edited by Oscar Wilde. It published studio photographs of actresses as well as aristocrats, including many in the former group who married into the nobility. The British royal family was a frequent subject; one of the magazine's first issues included an article and photographs about the Princess of Wales' childhood, and the publication regularly reported on the movements of Queen Victoria's family.
