= Coutil =

Firmly woven fabric used for making corsets and brassieres

Coutil (or coutille) is a twill-woven cloth used to make table covers, mattresses and tents, as well as corsets, orthotic supports, and other types of durable garments.

== Description ==
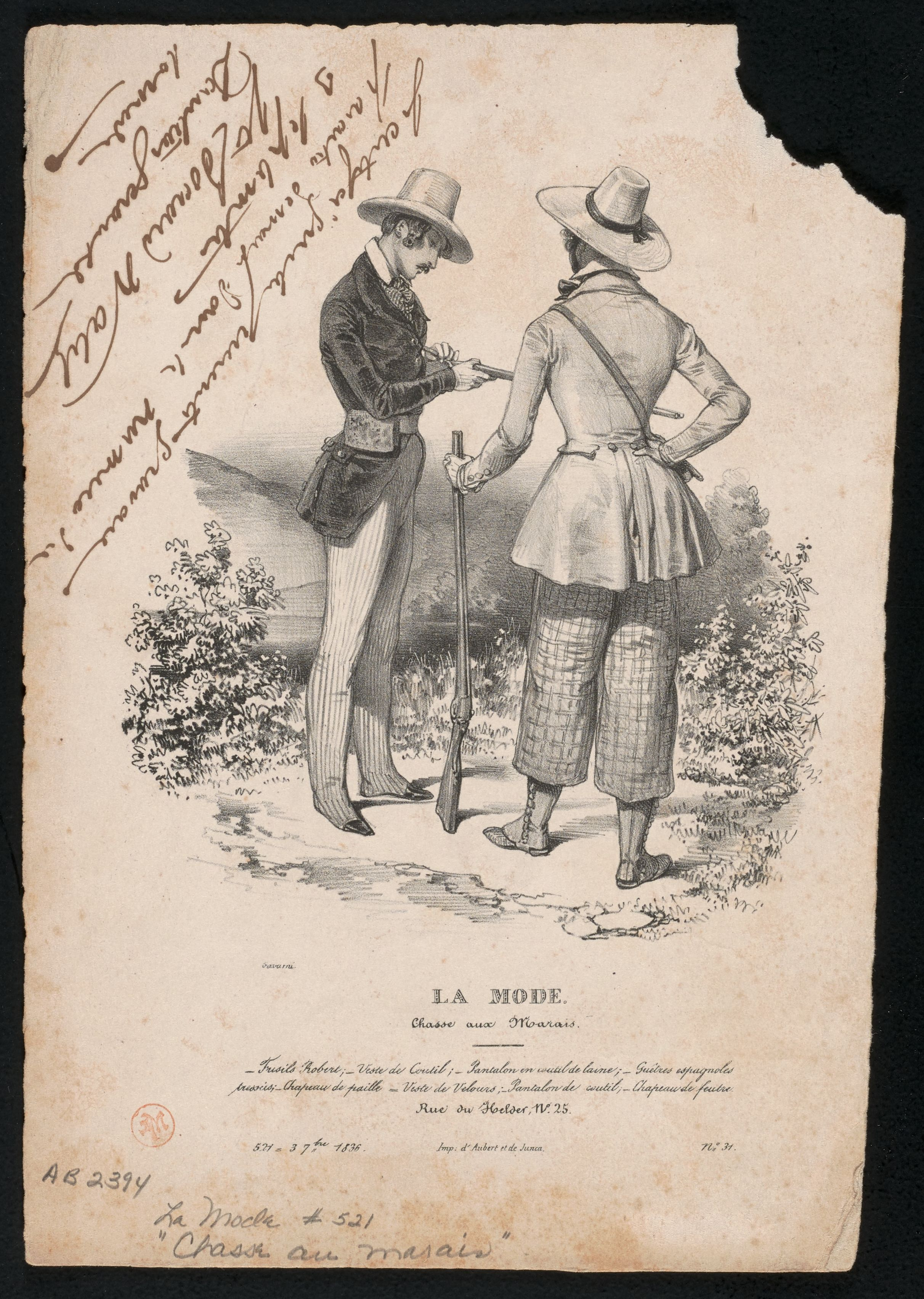
Hunting costumes showing a man (right) wearing a coutil jacket and pants of wool coutil, and a second man (left) wearing coutil pants.

Coutil is a sturdy, tightly-woven fabric used in a wide variety of clothing and household goods. Like other fabrics in the twill family, it is noted for its strength, durability, and ability to hide dirt.

There is some overlap between coutil and other twill weaves, such as drill, denim (or jean), and ticking. Historically, these terms could be used somewhat interchangeably; for example, the term French jean could be used to denote coutil used in corsetry.

In the past, coutil was made in a wide variety of weights and fibers including cotton, hemp, linen, and wool. Heavier versions made of linen or hemp were used to make clothing for work, hunting or sports. Tightly-woven, 100% cotton coutil with or without stripes is used to make mattresses. A variation featuring a herringbone weave is commonly used in corsets and ballet bodices.

New technology uses petroleum residues from recycled plastic bottles mixed with cotton to create a high-tech fiber used in the production of coutil and other fabrics.

== History ==
The names for coutil have shifted over time, along with trends in usage and popularity. For example, a type of coutil with brightly-colored stripes has been produced in the Basque region for over 100 years. This fabric was originally named Béarnese coutil (coutil béarnais) and was used to protect livestock from the elements. By the 1920s, it had become a popular material for tablecloths, and the name was updated to linge basque (not to be confused with a Basque) in order to appeal to the Parisian market. These changes helped smaller textile manufacturers remain in business for generations. One such example is a family business in Orthez, France, which started as a coutil pants (coutil-pantalon) shop before transitioning into table linens in the 1920s.

Corset coutil has been produced in Europe since the 1800s, with English and German coutil having a reputation for high quality. This industry was supported by large corset manufacturers who used locally-produced materials, such as Axford's Corsets, who closed in 2019. Corset makers report that many of the European fabric mills that manufactured coutil have also closed, with new supplies coming from India and China.

== Use in corsetry ==
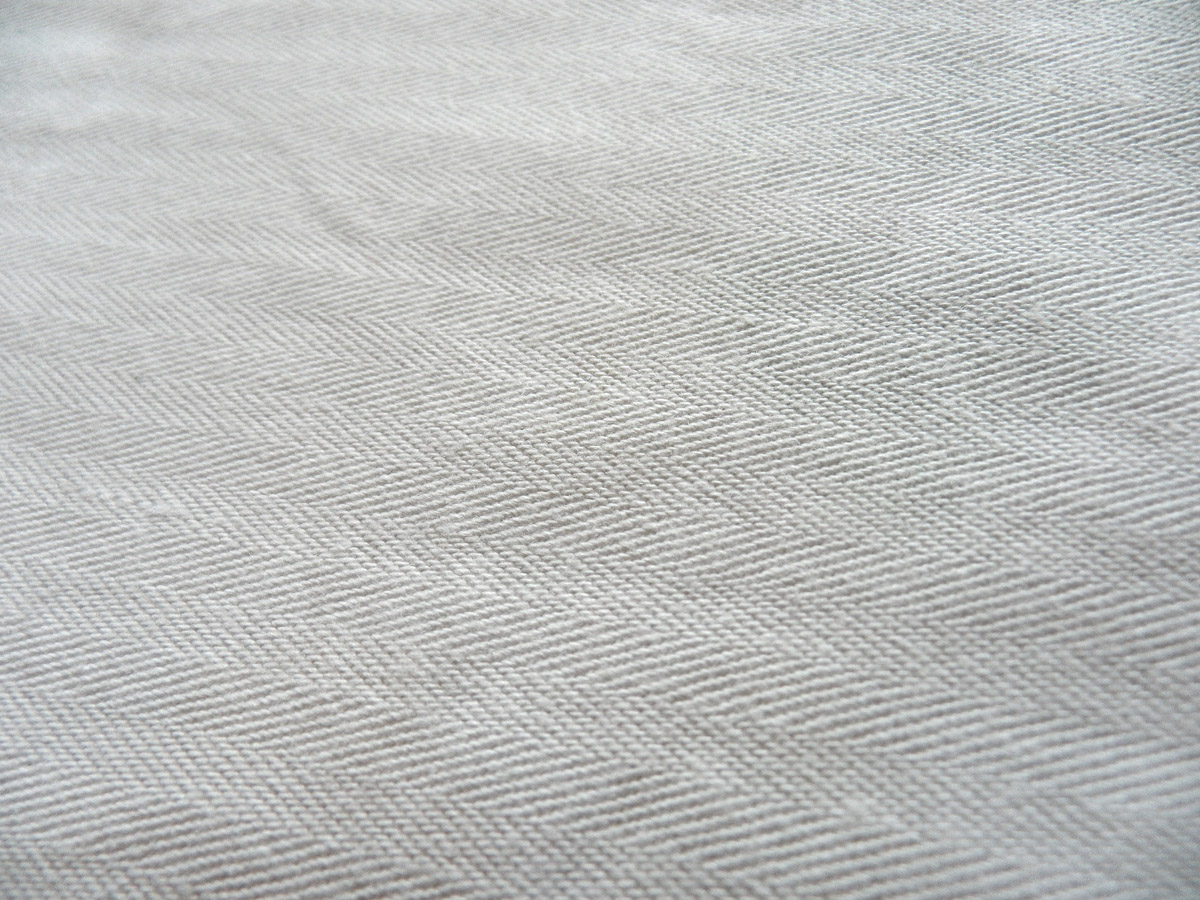
100% cotton white coutil

Corset coutil is traditionally woven in a herringbone or broken twill pattern. Satin-faced, brocade, and broche (or broché) versions are also available.

Coutil became a popular choice for corsets as early as the 1820s, though it may have been used earlier under other names, such as jean. The fabric's physical properties make it a popular choice among corsetmakers. As well as having strength and durability, 100% cotton coutil wicks moisture away from the body and has good dimensional stability, which means it will not stretch even when laced tightly. In addition, the herringbone weave of corset coutil alternates stripes of left hand twill and right hand twill, reducing the possibility of the fabric skewing along the diagonal of the twill pattern, which can be an issue with basic twill weaves.

== See also ==
- Ticking
