= His Private Secretary =

1933 American film

- Film poster
- Directed by: Phil Whitman
- Written by: Lewis D. Collins; Jack Natteford
- Produced by: Al Alt; D.J. Mountan
- Starring: Evalyn Knapp; John Wayne; Alec B. Francis; Natalie Kingston; Reginald Barlow; Arthur Hoyt
- Cinematography: Abe Scholtz
- Edited by: Bobby Ray
- Production company: Screencraft Productions
- Distributed by: Marcy Pictures
- Release date: June 10, 1933
- Running time: 60 minutes
- Country: United States
- Language: English
- Budget: $9,000
- Box office: $95,000

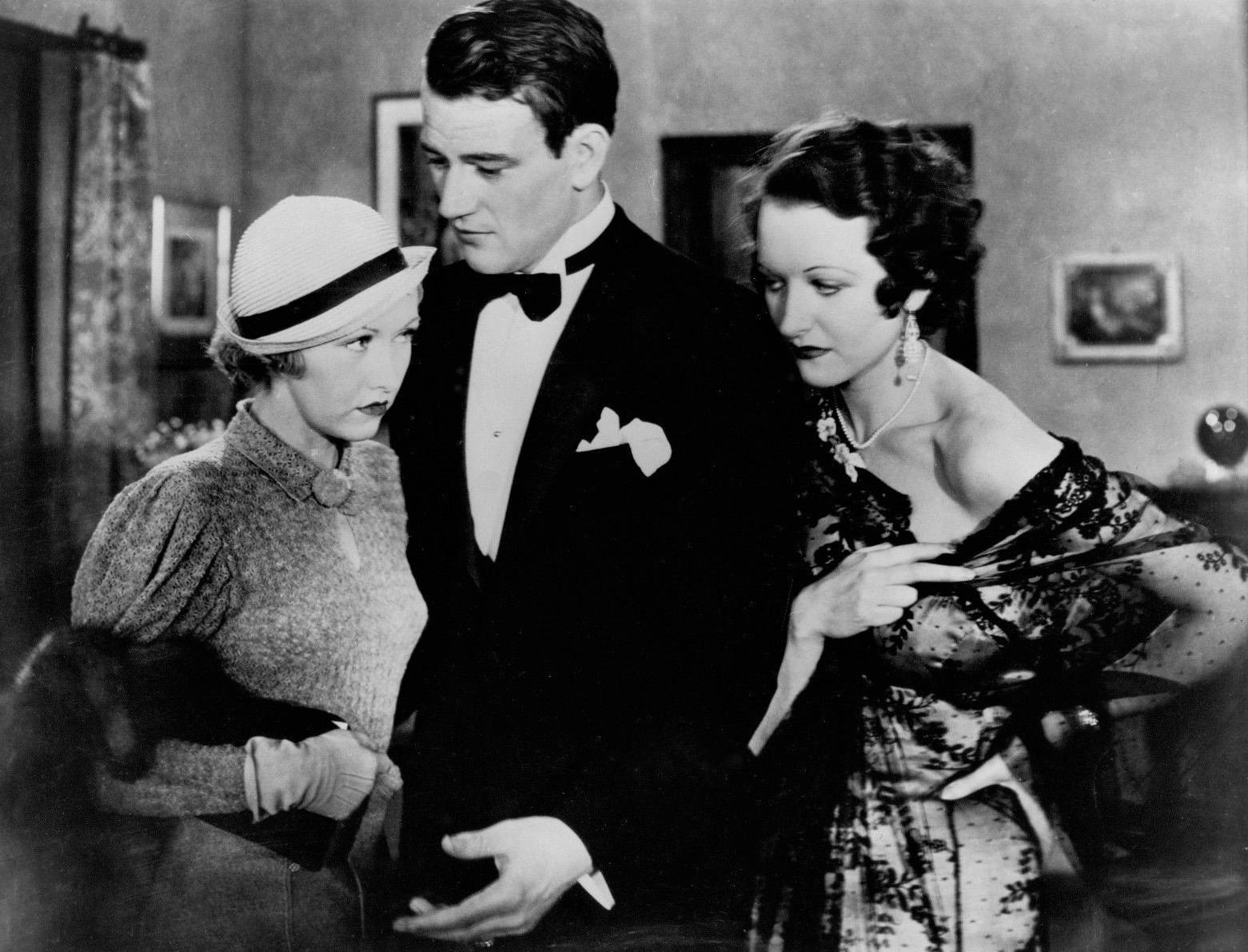
Evalyn Knapp, John Wayne and Natalie Kingston in His Private Secretary

His Private Secretary is a 1933 American pre-Code comedy film directed by Phil Whitman and starring Evalyn Knapp and John Wayne. It is an early Wayne non-Western film appearance, made when he was 26 years old.

== Plot ==
Dick Wallace has to prove to the preacher's daughter, his own father, his old friends, and himself that he is not just an irresponsible playboy. His new love Marion does a good job of convincing them. The question is whether or not it is true.

Gold digger Polly has set her sights on Dick. But Dick falls in love with Marion Hall, the granddaughter of a small town minister who owes Mr. Wallace money. Dick refuses to collect the debt, and is fired. He buys the only garage in town so he can stay and know Marion better.

After they are married, Dick's father refuses to meet the new wife, convinced sight unseen that she must be a gold digger. Marion walks into the office just as Mr.Wallace fires his secretary, and she ends up with the job. Thanks to the efforts of meek office manager Little, a 3-way reconciliation is eventually arrived at.

== Cast ==
- Evalyn Knapp as Marion Hall
- John Wayne as Dick Wallace
- Reginald Barlow as Mr. Wallace
- Alec B. Francis as Rev. Hall
- Arthur Hoyt as Little
- Natalie Kingston as Polly
- Patrick Cunning as Van, Polly's Brother
- Al St. John as Garage Owner Tom
- Hugh Kidder as Jenkins, the Butler
- Mickey Rentschler as Joe Boyd

== See also ==
- John Wayne filmography
