= List of American films of 1932 =

American films released in 1932

More than 488 American feature films were released in 1932.
Grand Hotel won Best Picture at the Academy Awards.

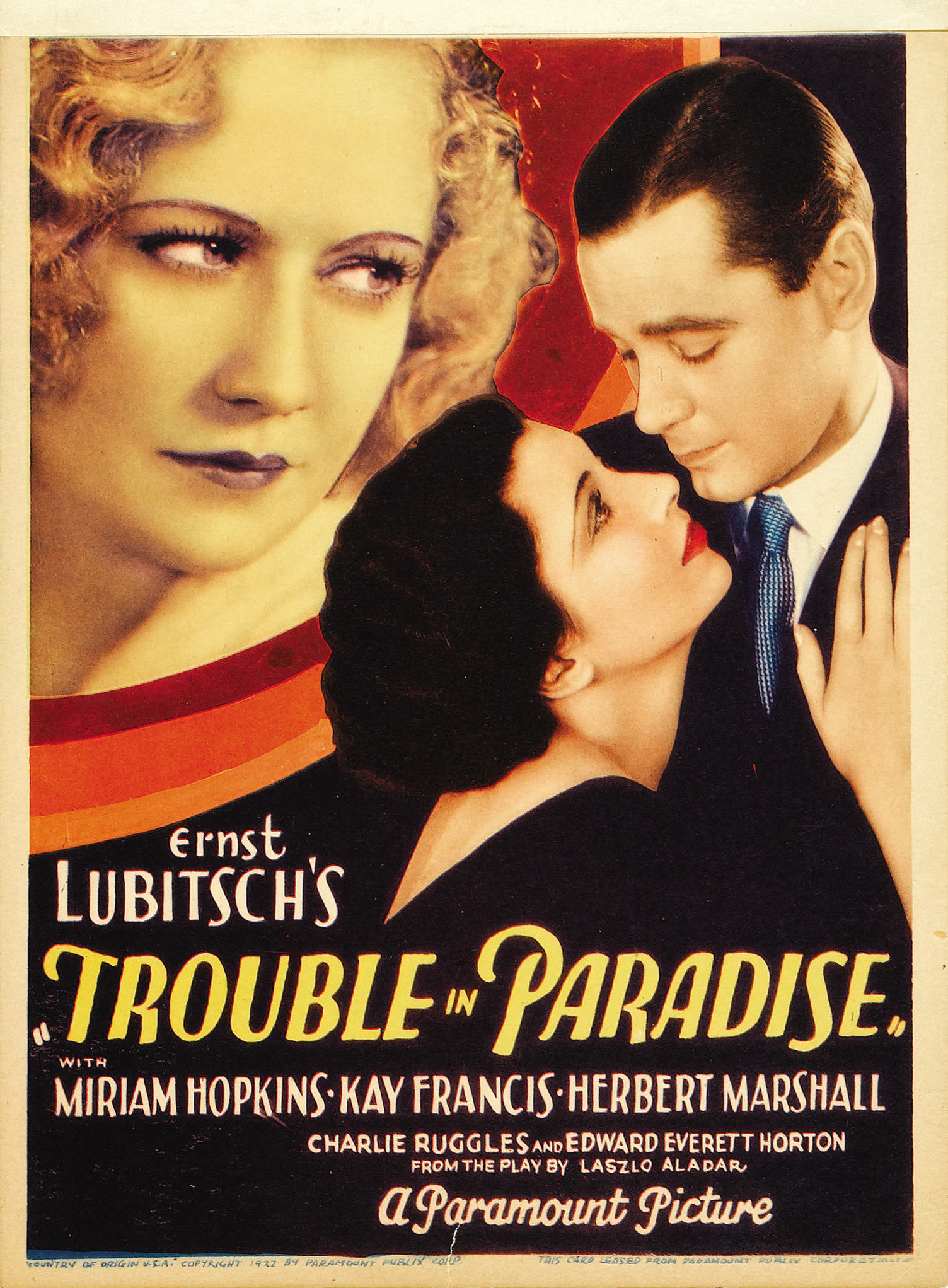
Trouble in Paradise. directed by Ernst Lubitsch.

== A-B ==
Title	Director	Cast	Genre	Notes
20,000 Years in Sing Sing	Michael Curtiz	Spencer Tracy, Bette Davis, Louis Calhern	Drama	Warner Bros.
70,000 Witnesses	Ralph Murphy	Dorothy Jordan, Phillips Holmes, Charlie Ruggles	Mystery	Paramount
Afraid to Talk	Edward L. Cahn	Sidney Fox, Eric Linden, Louis Calhern	Drama, Crime	Universal
After the Ball	Milton Rosmer	Esther Ralston, Basil Rathbone, George Curzon	Comedy	Fox Film. Co-Production with the UK
After Tomorrow	Frank Borzage	Charles Farrell, Marian Nixon, Minna Gombell	Drama	Fox Film
The Age of Consent	Gregory La Cava	Dorothy Wilson, Arline Judge, John Halliday	Drama	RKO
Air Mail	John Ford	Ralph Bellamy, Pat O'Brien, Gloria Stuart	Drama, Adventure	Universal
Alias Mary Smith	E. Mason Hopper	Blanche Mehaffey, Raymond Hatton, John Darrow	Mystery	Independent
Alias the Doctor	Michael Curtiz, Lloyd Bacon	Richard Barthelmess, Marian Marsh, Norman Foster	Drama	Warner Bros.
The All American	Russell Mack	Richard Arlen, Andy Devine, Gloria Stuart	Drama	Universal
Almost Married	William Cameron Menzies	Violet Heming, Ralph Bellamy, Alexander Kirkland	Thriller	Fox Film
Amateur Daddy	John G. Blystone	Warner Baxter, Marian Nixon, Rita La Roy	Drama	Fox Film
American Madness	Frank Capra	Walter Huston, Pat O'Brien, Kay Johnson	Drama	Columbia
The Animal Kingdom	Edward H. Griffith	Leslie Howard, Ann Harding, Myrna Loy	Drama	RKO
Aren't We All?	Harry Lachman	Gertrude Lawrence, Hugh Wakefield, Owen Nares	Comedy	Paramount
Are You Listening?	Harry Beaumont	William Haines, Madge Evans, Anita Page	Drama	MGM
The Arm of the Law	Louis King	Rex Bell, Marceline Day, Lina Basquette	Mystery	Monogram
Arsène Lupin	Jack Conway	John Barrymore, Lionel Barrymore, Karen Morley	Mystery	MGM
As the Devil Commands	Roy William Neill	Alan Dinehart, Mae Clarke, Neil Hamilton	Mystery	Columbia
As You Desire Me	George Fitzmaurice	Greta Garbo, Melvyn Douglas, Erich von Stroheim	Drama	MGM
Attorney for the Defense	Irving Cummings	Edmund Lowe, Constance Cummings, Evelyn Brent	Drama	Columbia
Bachelor's Affairs	Alfred L. Werker	Adolphe Menjou, Minna Gombell, Joan Marsh	Comedy	Fox Film
Bachelor Mother	Charles Hutchison	Evalyn Knapp, Margaret Seddon, James Murray	Action	Independent
Back Street	John M. Stahl	Irene Dunne, John Boles, ZaSu Pitts	Drama	Universal
Battling Buckaroo	Armand Schaefer	Lane Chandler, Doris Hill, Yakima Canutt	Western	Independent
The Beast of the City	Charles Brabin	Walter Huston, Jean Harlow, Wallace Ford	Drama, Crime	MGM
Beauty and the Boss	Roy Del Ruth	Marian Marsh, David Manners, Warren William	Comedy, Romance	Warner Bros.
Beauty Parlor	Richard Thorpe	Barbara Kent, Joyce Compton, Dorothy Revier	Drama	Chesterfield
Behind Jury Doors	B. Reeves Eason	Helen Chandler, William Collier Jr., Blanche Friderici	Mystery	Independent
Behind Stone Walls	Frank R. Strayer	Edward Nugent, Priscilla Dean, Ann Christy	Drama	Independent
Behind the Mask	John Francis Dillon	Jack Holt, Boris Karloff, Constance Cummings	Horror	Columbia
Between Fighting Men	Forrest Sheldon	Ken Maynard, Ruth Hall, Josephine Dunn	Western	Sono Art
Beyond the Rockies	Fred Allen	Tom Keene, Rochelle Hudson, Julian Rivero	Western	RKO
The Big Broadcast	Frank Tuttle	Bing Crosby, George Burns, Gracie Allen	Comedy, Musical	Paramount
Big City Blues	Mervyn LeRoy	Eric Linden, Joan Blondell, Walter Catlett	Drama	Warner Bros.
The Big Stampede	Tenny Wright	John Wayne, Noah Beery, Mae Madison	Western	Warner Bros.
The Big Timer	Edward Buzzell	Ben Lyon, Constance Cummings, Thelma Todd	Sports	Columbia
Big Town	Arthur Hoerl	Lester Vail, Frances Dade, John Miltern	Crime	Independent
A Bill of Divorcement	George Cukor	John Barrymore, Billie Burke, Katharine Hepburn	Drama	RKO
Bird of Paradise	King Vidor	Dolores del Río, Joel McCrea, John Halliday	Romantic	RKO
Blessed Event	Roy Del Ruth	Lee Tracy, Mary Brian, Dick Powell	Comedy	Warner Bros.
Blonde Venus	Josef von Sternberg	Marlene Dietrich, Herbert Marshall, Cary Grant	Drama	Paramount
Blondie of the Follies	Edmund Goulding	Marion Davies, Robert Montgomery, Billie Dove	Comedy	MGM
The Boiling Point	George Melford	Hoot Gibson, Helen Foster, Wheeler Oakman	Western	Independent
Border Devils	William Nigh	Gabby Hayes, Kathleen Collins, Harry Carey	Western	Independent
Breach of Promise	Paul L. Stein	Chester Morris, Mae Clarke, Theodore von Eltz	Drama	Tiffany
Broadway to Cheyenne	Harry L. Fraser	Rex Bell, Marceline Day, Robert Ellis	Western	Monogram
Broken Lullaby	Ernst Lubitsch	Lionel Barrymore, Nancy Carroll	Drama	Paramount
The Broken Wing	Lloyd Corrigan	Lupe Vélez, Melvyn Douglas, Leo Carrillo	Drama, Western	Paramount
Business and Pleasure	David Butler	Will Rogers, Joel McCrea, Dorothy Peterson	Comedy	Fox Film
But the Flesh Is Weak	Jack Conway	Robert Montgomery, Nora Gregor, Heather Thatcher	Comedy	MGM
By Whose Hand?	Benjamin Stoloff	Ben Lyon, Barbara Weeks, Tom Dugan	Comedy, Drama	Columbia

== C-D ==
Title	Director	Cast	Genre	Notes
The Cabin in the Cotton	Michael Curtiz	Bette Davis, Richard Barthelmess, Dorothy Jordan	Drama	First National
Call Her Savage	John Francis Dillon	Clara Bow, Thelma Todd, Gilbert Roland	Drama	Fox Film
Cannonball Express	Wallace Fox	Rex Lease, Leon Ames, Ruth Renick	Action	Sono Art
Careless Lady	Kenneth MacKenna	Joan Bennett, John Boles, Minna Gombell	Comedy	Fox Film
Carnival Boat	Albert S. Rogell	William Boyd, Ginger Rogers, Marie Prevost	Adventure	RKO
Central Park	John G. Adolfi	Joan Blondell, Wallace Ford, Guy Kibbee	Drama, Crime	First National
Chandu the Magician	William Cameron Menzies, Marcel Varnel	Edmund Lowe, Bela Lugosi, Irene Ware	Horror	Fox Film
Charlie Chan's Chance	John G. Blystone	Warner Oland, Marian Nixon, H. B. Warner	Drama, Mystery	Fox Film
Cheaters at Play	Hamilton MacFadden	Thomas Meighan, Charlotte Greenwood	Drama	Fox Film
Cock of the Air	Tom Buckingham	Chester Morris, Billie Dove, Walter Catlett	Comedy	United Artists
The Cohens and Kellys in Hollywood	John Francis Dillon	George Sidney, June Clyde, Norman Foster	Comedy	Universal
Come On Danger!	Robert F. Hill	Tom Keene, Julie Haydon, Robert Ellis	Western	RKO
Come On, Tarzan	Alan James	Ken Maynard, Merna Kennedy, Niles Welch	Western	Sono Art
The Conquerors	William A. Wellman	Richard Dix, Edna May Oliver, Guy Kibbee	Drama	RKO
Cornered	B. Reeves Eason	Tim McCoy, Shirley Grey, Noah Beery	Western	Columbia
The County Fair	Louis King	Hobart Bosworth, Marion Shilling, Ralph Ince	Sports/Drama	Monogram
Cowboy Counsellor	George Melford	Hoot Gibson, Sheila Bromley, Jack Rutherford	Western	Independent
The Crash	William Dieterle	Ruth Chatterton, George Brent, Paul Cavanagh	Drama	Warner Bros.
Crashin' Broadway	John P. McCarthy	Rex Bell, Doris Hill, Harry Bowen	Western	Monogram
The Crooked Circle	H. Bruce Humberstone	ZaSu Pitts, Ben Lyon, James Gleason	Comedy, Mystery	World Wide Pictures
Crooner	Lloyd Bacon	David Manners, Ann Dvorak, Claire Dodd	Musical	Warner Bros.
Cross-Examination	Richard Thorpe	H. B. Warner, Sally Blane, Natalie Moorhead	Drama	Independent
The Crowd Roars	Howard Hawks	James Cagney, Joan Blondell, Ann Dvorak	Sports	Warner Bros.
The Crusader	Frank R. Strayer	Evelyn Brent, H. B. Warner, Lew Cody	Drama	Majestic
Cynara	King Vidor	Ronald Colman, Kay Francis, Phyllis Barry	Drama	United Artists
Dancers in the Dark	David Burton	Miriam Hopkins, Jack Oakie, George Raft	Drama	Paramount
Dance Team	Sidney Lanfield	James Dunn, Sally Eilers, Ralph Morgan	Comedy	Fox Film
Daring Danger	D. Ross Lederman	Tim McCoy, Alberta Vaughn, Wallace MacDonald	Western	Columbia
The Dark Horse	Alfred E. Green	Bette Davis, Warren William, Guy Kibbee	Comedy, Drama	Warner Bros.
The Death Kiss	Edwin L. Marin	David Manners, Adrienne Ames, Bela Lugosi	Mystery	Tiffany
Deception	Lewis Seiler	Leo Carrillo, Thelma Todd, Barbara Weeks	Sports drama	Columbia
Destry Rides Again	Benjamin Stoloff	Tom Mix, Claudia Dell, ZaSu Pitts	Western	Universal
Devil and the Deep	Marion Gering	Tallulah Bankhead, Gary Cooper, Charles Laughton	Drama	Paramount
The Devil Is Driving	Benjamin Stoloff	Edmund Lowe, Wynne Gibson, James Gleason	Drama	Paramount
Devil on Deck	Wallace Fox	Reed Howes, Molly O'Day, Wheeler Oakman	Adventure	World Wide Pictures
Devil's Lottery	Sam Taylor	Elissa Landi, Victor McLaglen, Paul Cavanagh	Drama	Fox Film
Discarded Lovers	Fred C. Newmeyer	Natalie Moorhead, Russell Hopton, Barbara Weeks	Mystery	Independent
Disorderly Conduct	John W. Considine Jr.	Spencer Tracy, Sally Eilers, Ralph Bellamy	Comedy	Fox Film
Divorce in the Family	Charles Reisner	Jackie Cooper, Conrad Nagel, Lewis Stone	Drama, Romance	MGM
The Divorce Racket	Aubrey Scotto	James Rennie, Olive Borden, Judith Wood	Drama	Independent
Docks of San Francisco	George B. Seitz	Mary Nolan, Jason Robards Sr., Marjorie Beebe	Crime	Independent
Doctor X	Michael Curtiz	Fay Wray, Lionel Atwill, Lee Tracy	Drama, Horror	First National
Doomed Battalion	Cyril Gardner	Luis Trenker, Tala Birell, Victor Varconi	Drama	Universal
Down to Earth	David Butler	Will Rogers, Dorothy Jordan, Irene Rich	Comedy	Fox Film
Downstairs	Monta Bell	John Gilbert, Paul Lukas, Hedda Hopper	Drama	MGM
The Drifter	William A. O'Connor	William Farnum, Noah Beery Sr., Phyllis Barrington	Drama	Independent
Drifting Souls	Louis King	Lois Wilson, Theodore von Eltz, Raymond Hatton	Drama	Independent
Dynamite Denny	Frank R. Strayer	Jay Wilsey, Blanche Mehaffey, William V. Mong	Action	Independent
Dynamite Ranch	Forrest Sheldon	Ken Maynard, Ruth Hall, Alan Roscoe	Western	Sono Art

== E-F ==
Title	Director	Cast	Genre	Notes
Emma	Clarence Brown	Marie Dressler, Richard Cromwell, Jean Hersholt	Comedy, Drama	MGM
End of the Trail	D. Ross Lederman	Tim McCoy, Luana Walters, Wheeler Oakman	Western, Drama	Columbia
Escapade	Richard Thorpe	Jameson Thomas, Sally Blane, Anthony Bushell	Crime	Chesterfield
Evenings for Sale	Stuart Walker	Herbert Marshall, Sari Maritza, Charlie Ruggles	Comedy	Paramount
The Expert	Archie Mayo	Charles Sale, Dickie Moore, Lois Wilson	Comedy, Drama	Warner Bros.
Exposed	Albert Herman	William Collier Jr., Barbara Kent, Raymond Hatton	Crime	Independent
Exposure	Norman Houston	Lila Lee, Walter Byron, Tully Marshall	Drama	Independent
The Face on the Barroom Floor	Bertram Bracken	Dulcie Cooper, Bramwell Fletcher, Phillips Smalley	Crime	Chesterfield
Faithless	Harry Beaumont	Tallulah Bankhead, Robert Montgomery, Hugh Herbert	Drama	MGM
False Faces	Lowell Sherman	Peggy Shannon, Lila Lee, Berton Churchill	Drama	Sono Art
The Famous Ferguson Case	Lloyd Bacon	Joan Blondell, Grant Mitchell, Vivienne Osborne	Crime	Warner Bros.
A Farewell to Arms	Frank Borzage	Gary Cooper, Helen Hayes, Adolphe Menjou	Drama, War	Paramount.
Fast Companions	Kurt Neumann	Tom Brown, Maureen O'Sullivan, James Gleason	Sports	Universal
Fast Life	Harry A. Pollard	William Haines, Madge Evans, Conrad Nagel	Comedy	MGM
The Fighting Champ	John P. McCarthy	Bob Steele, Arletta Duncan, Kit Guard	Western	Monogram
The Fighting Fool	Lambert Hillyer	Tim McCoy, Marceline Day, Dorothy Granger	Western	RKO
Fighting for Justice	Otto Brower	Tim McCoy, Joyce Compton, Robert Frazer	Western	RKO
The Fighting Gentleman	Fred C. Newmeyer	William Collier Jr., Josephine Dunn, Natalie Moorhead	Sport	Independent
The Final Edition	Howard Higgin	Pat O'Brien, Mae Clarke, Bradley Page	Drama	Columbia
Fireman, Save My Child	Lloyd Bacon	Joe E. Brown, Lilian Bond, Evalyn Knapp	Comedy	Warner Bros.
The First Year	William K. Howard	Janet Gaynor, Charles Farrell, Minna Gombell	Comedy drama	Fox Film
Flames	Karl Brown	Johnny Mack Brown, Noel Francis, Marjorie Beebe	Drama	Monogram
Flaming Guns	Arthur Rosson	Tom Mix, Ruth Hall, William Farnum	Western	Universal
Flesh	John Ford	Wallace Beery, Ricardo Cortez, Karen Morley	Drama	MGM
A Fool's Advice	Ralph Ceder	Frank Fay, Nat Pendleton, Ruth Hall	Comedy	Warner Bros.
Forbidden	Frank Capra	Barbara Stanwyck, Adolphe Menjou, Ralph Bellamy	Drama	Columbia
Forbidden Company	Richard Thorpe	Sally Blane, John Darrow, Myrtle Stedman	Drama	Chesterfield
Forbidden Trail	Lambert Hillyer	Buck Jones, Barbara Weeks, George Cooper	Western	Columbia
Forgotten Commandments	Louis J. Gasnier	Sari Maritza, Gene Raymond, Marguerite Churchill	Drama	Paramount
The Forty-Niners	John P. McCarthy	Tom Tyler, Betty Mack, Fern Emmett	Western	Independent
The Fourth Horseman	Hamilton MacFadden	Tom Mix, Margaret Lindsay, Fred Kohler	Western	Universal
Freaks	Tod Browning	Wallace Ford, Leila Hyams, Olga Baclanova	Drama, Horror	MGM
Frisco Jenny	William A. Wellman	Ruth Chatterton, Louis Calhern, Helen Jerome Eddy	Drama	First National

== G-H ==
Title	Director	Cast	Genre	Notes
The Gambling Sex	Fred C. Newmeyer	Ruth Hall, Grant Withers, Maston Williams	Drama	Independent
The Gay Buckaroo	Phil Rosen	Hoot Gibson, Merna Kennedy, Roy D'Arcy	Western	
The Gay Caballero	Alfred L. Werker	George O'Brien, Victor McLaglen, Conchita Montenegro	Western	Fox Film
Get That Girl	George Crone	Richard Talmadge, Shirley Grey, Carl Stockdale	Action	Independent
Ghost City	Harry L. Fraser	Bill Cody, Helen Foster, Walter Miller	Action	Monogram
Ghost Valley	Fred Allen	Tom Keene, Merna Kennedy, Ted Adams	Western	RKO
Girl Crazy	William A. Seiter	Bert Wheeler, Robert Woolsey, Dorothy Lee	Comedy	RKO
The Girl from Calgary	Phil Whitman	Fifi D'Orsay, Paul Kelly, Robert Warwick	Musical comedy	Monogram
The Girl from Chicago	Oscar Micheaux	Grace Smith, Carl Mahon, Juano Hernandez	Drama	Independent
Girl of the Rio	Herbert Brenon	Dolores del Río, Leo Carrillo, Norman Foster	Romance	RKO
Gold	Otto Brower	Jack Hoxie, Alice Day, Lafe McKee	Western	Majestic
The Golden West	David Howard	George O'Brien, Marion Burns, Onslow Stevens	Western	Fox Film
Gorilla Ship	Frank R. Strayer	Ralph Ince, Vera Reynolds, Reed Howes	Adventure	Independent
Grand Hotel	Edmund Goulding	Greta Garbo, John Barrymore, Joan Crawford	Drama	MGM. Oscar for Best Film
The Greeks Had a Word for Them	Lowell Sherman	Joan Blondell, Madge Evans, Ina Claire	Comedy	United Artists
Guilty as Hell	Erle C. Kenton	Edmund Lowe, Victor McLaglen, Richard Arlen	Mystery, Comedy	Paramount
Guilty or Not Guilty	Albert Ray	Betty Compson, Claudia Dell, Wheeler Oakman	Crime	Monogram
Guns for Hire	Lewis D. Collins	Lane Chandler, Neal Hart, Yakima Canutt	Western	Independent
The Half-Naked Truth	Gregory La Cava	Lupe Vélez, Lee Tracy, Franklin Pangborn	Comedy	RKO
Handle with Care	David Butler	James Dunn, Boots Mallory, El Brendel	Drama	Fox Film
Harlem Is Heaven	Irwin Franklyn	Anise Boyer, Bill Robinson, Eubie Blake	Musical	Independent
Hat Check Girl	Sidney Lanfield	Sally Eilers, Ben Lyon, Ginger Rogers	Comedy	Fox Film
The Hatchet Man	William A. Wellman	Edward G. Robinson, Loretta Young, Leslie Fenton	Crime	Warner Bros.
Haunted Gold	Mack V. Wright	John Wayne, Sheila Terry, Blue Washington	Western	Warner Bros.
He Learned About Women	Lloyd Corrigan	Stuart Erwin, Alison Skipworth, Susan Fleming	Comedy	Paramount
The Heart of New York	Mervyn LeRoy	George Sidney, Ruth Hall, Aline MacMahon	Comedy	Warner Bros.
The Heart Punch	B. Reeves Eason	Lloyd Hughes, Marion Shilling, Mae Busch	Drama	Independent
Hearts of Humanity	Christy Cabanne	Jean Hersholt, Claudia Dell, Charles Delaney	Drama	Majestic
Hello Trouble	Lambert Hillyer	Buck Jones, Lina Basquette, Otto Hoffman	Western	Columbia
Hell Fire Austin	Forrest Sheldon	Ken Maynard, Nat Pendleton, Alan Roscoe	Western	Tiffany
Hell's Headquarters	Andrew L. Stone	Jack Mulhall, Barbara Weeks, Frank Mayo	Drama	Independent
Hell's Highway	Rowland Brown	Richard Dix, Rochelle Hudson, Oscar Apfel	Drama	RKO
Hell's House	Howard Higgin	Bette Davis, Pat O'Brien, Junior Durkin	Drama	Independent
Her Mad Night	E. Mason Hopper	Conway Tearle, Irene Rich, Mary Carlisle	Crime	Independent
Heritage of the Desert	Henry Hathaway	Randolph Scott, Sally Blane, J. Farrell MacDonald	Western	Paramount
Hidden Gold	Arthur Rosson	Tom Mix, Raymond Hatton, Judith Barrie	Western	Universal
Hidden Valley	Robert N. Bradbury	Bob Steele, Gertrude Messinger, Francis McDonald	Western	Monogram
High Pressure	Mervyn LeRoy	William Powell, Evelyn Brent, Evalyn Knapp	Comedy	Warner Bros.
High Speed	D. Ross Lederman	Buck Jones, Pat O'Malley, Mickey Rooney	Crime	Columbia
Hold 'Em Jail	Norman Taurog	Bert Wheeler, Robert Woolsey, Betty Grable	Comedy	RKO
Hollywood Speaks	Edward Buzzell	Genevieve Tobin, Pat O'Brien, Lucien Prival	Comedy	Columbia
Honor of the Mounted	Harry L. Fraser	Tom Tyler, Stanley Blystone, Francis McDonald	Western	Monogram
The Honor of the Press	B. Reeves Eason	Edward Nugent, Rita La Roy, Dorothy Gulliver	Crime	Independent
Horse Feathers	Norman Z. McLeod	Groucho Marx, Chico Marx, Thelma Todd	Comedy	Paramount
Hot Saturday	William A. Seiter	Nancy Carroll, Cary Grant, Randolph Scott	Drama	Paramount
Hotel Continental	Christy Cabanne	Peggy Shannon, Theodore von Eltz, Alan Mowbray	Crime	Tiffany
Huddle	Sam Wood	Ramon Novarro, Madge Evans, Una Merkel	Sports, Drama	MGM
Hypnotized	Mack Sennett	Charles Murray, Ernest Torrence, Wallace Ford	Comedy	Sono Art

== I-K ==
Title	Director	Cast	Genre	Notes
I Am a Fugitive from a Chain Gang	Mervyn LeRoy	Paul Muni, Glenda Farrell, Allen Jenkins	Drama	Warner Bros.
If I Had a Million	James Cruze, Ernst Lubitsch	Gary Cooper, Charles Laughton, W. C. Fields	Comedy, Drama	Paramount
The Impatient Maiden	James Whale	Lew Ayres, Mae Clarke, Una Merkel	Drama	Universal
Island of Lost Souls	Erle C. Kenton	Charles Laughton, Richard Arlen, Bela Lugosi	Science fiction	Paramount
Is My Face Red?	William A. Seiter	Helen Twelvetrees, Ricardo Cortez, Jill Esmond	Crime	RKO
It's Tough to Be Famous	Alfred E. Green	Douglas Fairbanks Jr., Mary Brian, Emma Dunn	Comedy	Warner Bros.
Jenny Lind	Arthur Robison	Grace Moore, Andre Luguet, Françoise Rosay	Musical biopic	MGM
Jewel Robbery	William Dieterle	William Powell, Kay Francis, Helen Vinson	Comedy, Crime	Warner Bros.
The Kid from Spain	Leo McCarey	Eddie Cantor, Lyda Roberti, Robert Young	Comedy	United Artists
The King Murder	Richard Thorpe	Conway Tearle, Natalie Moorhead, Marceline Day	Mystery	Chesterfield
Klondike	Phil Rosen	Thelma Todd, Lyle Talbot, Henry B. Walthall	Drama	Monogram
Kongo	William J. Cowen	Walter Huston, Lupe Vélez, Virginia Bruce	Drama	MGM

== L-M ==
Title	Director	Cast	Genre	Notes
Ladies of the Jury	Lowell Sherman	Edna May Oliver, Jill Esmond, Roscoe Ates	Comedy	RKO
Lady and Gent	Stephen Roberts	George Bancroft, Wynne Gibson, John Wayne	Drama	Paramount
Lady with a Past	Edward H. Griffith	Constance Bennett, Ben Lyon, David Manners	Comedy	RKO
The Last Man	Howard Higgin	Charles Bickford, Constance Cummings, Alec B. Francis	Mystery	Columbia
The Last Mile	Samuel Bischoff	Preston Foster, Noel Madison, Alan Roscoe	Drama	Sono Art
Law and Lawless	Armand Schaefer	Jack Hoxie, Julian Rivero, Yakima Canutt	Western	Majestic
Law and Order	Edward L. Cahn	Walter Huston, Harry Carey, Harry Woods	Western	Universal
Law of the Sea	Otto Brower	William Farnum, Priscilla Dean, Sally Blane	Drama	Monogram
Law of the North	Harry L. Fraser	Bill Cody, William L. Thorne, Gilbert Pratt	Western	Monogram
Law of the West	Robert N. Bradbury	Bob Steele, Nancy Drexel, Ed Brady	Western	Sono Art
Lawless Valley	J.P. McGowan	Lane Chandler, Gertrude Messinger, Richard Cramer	Western	Independent
Lawyer Man	William Dieterle	William Powell, Joan Blondell, Helen Vinson	Drama	Warner Bros.
Lena Rivers	Phil Rosen	Charlotte Henry, James Kirkwood, Beryl Mercer	Drama	Tiffany
Letty Lynton	Clarence Brown	Joan Crawford, Robert Montgomery, Nils Asther	Drama	MGM
Life Begins	James Flood	Loretta Young, Eric Linden, Glenda Farrell	Drama	Warner Bros.
Little Orphan Annie	John S. Robertson	Mitzi Green, May Robson, Matt Moore	Comedy	RKO
The Local Bad Man	Otto Brower	Hoot Gibson, Sally Blane, Hooper Atchley	Western	Independent
The Lone Trail	Forrest Sheldon, Harry S. Webb	Rex Lease, Virginia Brown Faire, Jack Mower	Western	Independent
The Lost Squadron	George Archainbaud	Richard Dix, Mary Astor, Erich von Stroheim	Drama, War	RKO
Love Affair	Thornton Freeland	Dorothy Mackaill, Humphrey Bogart, Hale Hamilton	Drama	Columbia
Love Bound	Robert F. Hill	Jack Mulhall, Natalie Moorhead, Clara Kimball Young	Drama	Independent
Love in High Gear	Frank R. Strayer	Alberta Vaughn, Tyrell Davis, Harrison Ford	Comedy	Independent
Love Is a Racket	William A. Wellman	Douglas Fairbanks Jr., Ann Dvorak, Frances Dee	Comedy	Warner Bros.
Love Me Tonight	Rouben Mamoulian	Jeanette MacDonald, Maurice Chevalier, Charles Ruggles	Musical	Paramount
Lovers Courageous	Robert Z. Leonard	Robert Montgomery, Madge Evans, Roland Young	Drama	MGM
Lucky Larrigan	John P. McCarthy	Rex Bell, Helen Foster, Stanley Blystone	Western	Monogram
Madame Butterfly	Marion Gering	Sylvia Sidney, Cary Grant, Irving Pichel	Drama	Paramount
Madame Racketeer	Alexander Hall	Alison Skipworth, Richard Bennett, George Raft	Comedy	Paramount
Madison Square Garden	Harry Joe Brown	Jack Oakie, Marian Nixon, William Boyd	Drama, Sports	Paramount
Make Me a Star	William Beaudine	Joan Blondell, Stuart Erwin, ZaSu Pitts	Comedy	Paramount
Malay Nights	E. Mason Hopper	Johnny Mack Brown, Dorothy Burgess, Ralph Ince	Drama	Independent
Manhattan Tower	Frank R. Strayer	Mary Brian, Irene Rich, James Hall	Drama	Independent
Man About Town	John Francis Dillon	Warner Baxter, Karen Morley, Conway Tearle	Drama	Fox Film
Man Against Woman	Irving Cummings	Jack Holt, Lillian Miles, Walter Connolly	Crime	Columbia
The Man Called Back	Robert Florey	Conrad Nagel, Doris Kenyon, Juliette Compton	Drama	Tiffany
The Man from Arizona	Harry L. Fraser	Rex Bell, Nat Carr, Henry Sedley	Western	Monogram
The Man from Hell's Edges	Robert N. Bradbury	Bob Steele, Nancy Drexel, Julian Rivero	Western	Sono-Art
The Man from New Mexico	J.P. McGowan	Tom Tyler, Caryl Lincoln, Jack Richardson	Western	Monogram
The Man from Yesterday	Berthold Viertel	Claudette Colbert, Clive Brook, Charles Boyer	War Drama	Paramount
Man Wanted	William Dieterle	Kay Francis, David Manners, Una Merkel	Romance	Warner Bros.
The Man Who Played God	John G. Adolfi	Bette Davis, George Arliss, Violet Heming	Drama	Warner Bros.
A Man's Land	Phil Rosen	Hoot Gibson, Marion Shilling, Robert Ellis	Western	Independent
Mark of the Spur	J.P. McGowan	Bob Custer, Lillian Rich, Lafe McKee	Western	Independent
The Mask of Fu Manchu	Charles Brabin	Boris Karloff, Lewis Stone, Karen Morley	Horror, Sci-Fi	MGM
Mason of the Mounted	Harry L. Fraser	Bill Cody, Nancy Drexel, LeRoy Mason	Western	Monogram
The Match King	William Keighley, Howard Bretherton	Warren William, Lili Damita, Glenda Farrell	Drama	Warner Bros.
McKenna of the Mounted	D. Ross Lederman	Buck Jones, Greta Granstedt, Walter McGrail	Western	Columbia
Me and My Gal	Raoul Walsh	Spencer Tracy, Joan Bennett, Marion Burns	Drama	Fox Film
The Menace	Roy William Neill	H. B. Warner, Bette Davis, Natalie Moorhead	Crime	Columbia
Men Are Such Fools	William Nigh	Leo Carrillo, Vivienne Osborne, Una Merkel	Drama	RKO
Men of America	Ralph Ince	William Boyd, Dorothy Wilson, Charles Sale	Western	RKO
Men of Chance	George Archainbaud	Ricardo Cortez, Mary Astor, Ralph Ince	Drama	RKO
Merrily We Go to Hell	Dorothy Arzner	Fredric March, Sylvia Sidney, Cary Grant	Comedy, Drama	Paramount
The Midnight Lady	Richard Thorpe	Sarah Padden, John Darrow, Claudia Dell	Crime	Chesterfield
Midnight Morals	E. Mason Hopper	Alberta Vaughn, Rex Lease, Charles Delaney	Crime	Independent
The Midnight Patrol	Christy Cabanne	Regis Toomey, Betty Bronson, Mary Nolan	Comedy	Monogram
The Midnight Warning	Spencer Gordon Bennet	William Boyd, Claudia Dell, Huntley Gordon	Drama, Mystery	Independent
Million Dollar Legs	Edward F. Cline	W. C. Fields, Jack Oakie, Hugh Herbert	Comedy	Paramount
The Miracle Man	Norman Z. McLeod	Sylvia Sidney, Chester Morris, Virginia Bruce	Drama	Paramount
Misleading Lady	Stuart Walker	Claudette Colbert, Edmund Lowe, Stuart Erwin	Comedy	Paramount
Miss Pinkerton	Lloyd Bacon	Joan Blondell, George Brent, Ruth Hall	Comedy	Warner Bros.
The Monster Walks	Frank R. Strayer	Rex Lease, Vera Reynolds, Sheldon Lewis	Horror	Independent
The Most Dangerous Game	Irving Pichel	Joel McCrea, Fay Wray, Robert Armstrong	Adventure, Thriller	RKO
The Mouthpiece	Elliott Nugent	Warren William, Sidney Fox, Aline MacMahon	Crime	Warner Bros.
Movie Crazy	Clyde Bruckman	Harold Lloyd, Constance Cummings, Kenneth Thomson	Comedy	Paramount
Mr. Robinson Crusoe	A. Edward Sutherland	Douglas Fairbanks, William Farnum, Maria Alba	Adventure	United Artists
The Mummy	Karl Freund	Boris Karloff, Zita Johann, David Manners	Drama, Horror	Universal
Murder at Dawn	Richard Thorpe	Josephine Dunn, Jack Mulhall, Eddie Boland	Mystery	Independent
Murders in the Rue Morgue	Robert Florey	Bela Lugosi, Sidney Fox, Leon Ames	Crime, Horror	Universal
My Pal, the King	Kurt Neumann	Tom Mix, Mickey Rooney, Noel Francis	Western	Universal
Mystery Ranch	David Howard	Charles Middleton, Cecilia Parker, George O'Brien	Western	Fox Film

== N-O ==
Title	Director	Cast	Genre	Notes
New Morals for Old	Charles Brabin	Robert Young, Lewis Stone, Myrna Loy	Romance	MGM
Night After Night	Archie Mayo	George Raft, Constance Cummings, Mae West	Comedy drama	Paramount
The Night Club Lady	Irving Cummings	Adolphe Menjou, Mayo Methot, Ruthelma Stevens	Mystery	Columbia
Night Court	W. S. Van Dyke	Walter Huston, Anita Page, Phillips Holmes	Drama, Crime	MGM
The Night of June 13	Stephen Roberts	Clive Brook, Lila Lee, Frances Dee	Mystery	Paramount
The Night Mayor	Benjamin Stoloff	Lee Tracy, Evalyn Knapp, Eugene Pallette	Drama	Columbia
The Night Rider	Fred C. Newmeyer, William Nigh	Harry Carey, Elinor Fair, Julian Rivero	Western	Independent
Night World	Hobart Henley	Lew Ayres, Mae Clarke, Boris Karloff	Drama	Universal
No Greater Love	Lewis Seiler	Dickie Moore, Beryl Mercer, Hobart Bosworth	Drama	Columbia
No Living Witness	E. Mason Hopper	Gilbert Roland, Noah Beery, Barbara Kent	Drama	Independent
No Man of Her Own	Wesley Ruggles	Clark Gable, Carole Lombard, Dorothy Mackaill	Drama	Paramount
No More Orchids	Walter Lang	Carole Lombard, Lyle Talbot, Walter Connolly	Romance	Columbia
No One Man	Lloyd Corrigan	Carole Lombard, Ricardo Cortez, Paul Lukas	Drama	Paramount
Officer Thirteen	George Melford	Monte Blue, Lila Lee, Mickey Rooney	Crime	Independent
Okay, America!	Tay Garnett	Lew Ayres, Maureen O'Sullivan, Louis Calhern	Drama	Universal
The Old Dark House	James Whale	Boris Karloff, Melvyn Douglas, Charles Laughton	Comedy; Horror	Universal
Once in a Lifetime	Russell Mack	Jack Oakie, Sidney Fox, Aline MacMahon	Comedy	Universal
One Hour with You	Ernst Lubitsch	Jeanette MacDonald, Maurice Chevalier, Genevieve Tobin	Musical	Paramount
One Man Law	Lambert Hillyer	Buck Jones, Shirley Grey, Robert Ellis	Western	Columbia
One Way Passage	Tay Garnett	William Powell, Kay Francis, Aline MacMahon	Drama	Warner Bros.
Out of Singapore	Charles Hutchison	Noah Beery Sr., Miriam Seegar, Dorothy Burgess	Action	Independent
Outlaw Justice	Armand Schaefer	Jack Hoxie, Dorothy Gulliver, Donald Keith	Western	Majestic

== P-R ==
Title	Director	Cast	Genre	Notes
Pack Up Your Troubles	George Marshall	Stan Laurel, Oliver Hardy, Don Dillaway	Comedy	MGM
The Painted Woman	John G. Blystone	Spencer Tracy, Peggy Shannon, Irving Pichel	Thriller	Fox Film
Panama Flo	Ralph Murphy	Helen Twelvetrees, Charles Bickford, Robert Armstrong	Drama	RKO
A Parisian Romance	Chester M. Franklin	Lew Cody, Marion Shilling, Gilbert Roland	Romance	Independent
Partners	Fred Allen	Tom Keene, Nancy Drexel, Otis Harlan	Western	RKO
The Passionate Plumber	Edward Sedgwick	Buster Keaton, Jimmy Durante, Irene Purcell	Comedy	MGM
A Passport to Hell	Frank Lloyd	Elissa Landi, Paul Lukas, Warner Oland	Drama	Fox Film
Passport to Paradise	George B. Seitz	Jack Mulhall, Blanche Mehaffey, Eddie Phillips	Drama	Independent
Payment Deferred	Lothar Mendes	Charles Laughton, Maureen O'Sullivan, Dorothy Peterson	Crime thriller	MGM
The Penal Code	George Melford	Regis Toomey, Pat O'Malley, Helen Cohan	Crime	Independent
The Penguin Pool Murder	George Archainbaud	Edna May Oliver, Mae Clarke, Robert Armstrong	Mystery	RKO
The Phantom Express	Emory Johnson	William Collier Jr., Sally Blane, Hobart Bosworth	Mystery	Majestic
The Phantom of Crestwood	J. Walter Ruben	Ricardo Cortez, Karen Morley, Anita Louise	Mystery	RKO
The Phantom President	Norman Taurog	George M. Cohan, Claudette Colbert, Jimmy Durante	Comedy	Paramount
Play Girl	Ray Enright	Winnie Lightner, Loretta Young, Norman Foster	Romance	Warner Bros.
Police Court	Louis King	Henry B. Walthall, Leon Janney, Aileen Pringle	Drama	Monogram
Polly of the Circus	Alfred Santell	Marion Davies, Clark Gable, C. Aubrey Smith	Drama	MGM
Prestige	Tay Garnett	Adolphe Menjou, Melvyn Douglas, Ann Harding	Drama	RKO
The Pride of the Legion	Ford Beebe	Victor Jory, Barbara Kent, Sally Blane	Drama	Mascot
Probation	Richard Thorpe	Sally Blane, John Darrow, Clara Kimball Young	Drama	Chesterfield
Prosperity	Sam Wood	Marie Dressler, Polly Moran, Anita Page	Comedy, Drama	MGM
The Purchase Price	William A. Wellman	Barbara Stanwyck, George Brent, Lyle Talbot	Comedy, Drama	Warner Bros.
Rackety Rax	Alfred L. Werker	Victor McLaglen, Greta Nissen, Nell O'Day	Comedy	Fox Film
The Racing Strain	Jerome Storm	Wallace Reid Jr., Phyllis Barrington, Mae Busch	Sports	Independent
Racing Youth	Vin Moore	Slim Summerville, Louise Fazenda, June Clyde	Drama	Universal
Radio Patrol	Edward L. Cahn	Robert Armstrong, Lila Lee, June Clyde	Crime	Universal
Rain	Lewis Milestone	Joan Crawford, Walter Huston, William Gargan	Drama	United Artists
The Rainbow Trail	David Howard	George O'Brien, Cecilia Parker, Roscoe Ates	Western	Fox Film
Rasputin and the Empress	Charles Brabin	John Barrymore, Lionel Barrymore, Ethel Barrymore	Drama	MGM
Rebecca of Sunnybrook Farm	Alfred Santell	Marian Nixon, Mae Marsh, Ralph Bellamy	Drama	Fox Film
The Reckless Rider	Armand Schaefer	Lane Chandler, Phyllis Barrington, Neal Hart	Western	Independent
The Reckoning	Harry L. Fraser	Sally Blane, James Murray, Bryant Washburn	Drama	Monogram
Red Dust	Victor Fleming	Clark Gable, Jean Harlow, Mary Astor	Drama	MGM
Red-Haired Alibi	Christy Cabanne	Merna Kennedy, Theodore von Eltz, Grant Withers	Drama	Independent
Red-Headed Woman	Jack Conway	Jean Harlow, Chester Morris, Charles Boyer	Comedy	MGM
Renegades of the West	Casey Robinson	Tom Keene, Roscoe Ates, Betty Furness	Western	RKO
The Rich Are Always with Us	Alfred E. Green	Ruth Chatterton, George Brent, Bette Davis	Comedy	Warner Bros.
Ride Him, Cowboy	Fred Allen	John Wayne, Otis Harlan, Ruth Hall	Western	Warner Bros.
The Rider of Death Valley	Albert S. Rogell	Tom Mix, Lois Wilson, Fred Kohler	Western	Universal
Riders of the Desert	Robert N. Bradbury	Bob Steele, Gertrude Messinger, George 'Gabby' Hayes	Western	Sono Art
The Riding Tornado	D. Ross Lederman	Tim McCoy, Shirley Grey, Montagu Love	Western	Columbia
Ridin' for Justice	D. Ross Lederman	Buck Jones, Mary Doran, Russell Simpson	Western	Columbia
The Roadhouse Murder	J. Walter Ruben	Dorothy Jordan, Eric Linden, Roscoe Ates	Thriller	RKO
Roar of the Dragon	Wesley Ruggles	Richard Dix, Gwili Andre, Edward Everett Horton	Adventure	RKO
Rockabye	George Cukor	Constance Bennett, Joel McCrea, Paul Lukas	Drama	RKO

== S-T ==
Title	Director	Cast	Genre	Notes
The Saddle Buster	Fred Allen	Tom Keene, Helen Foster, Marie Quillan	Western	RKO
Sally of the Subway	George B. Seitz	Jack Mulhall, Dorothy Revier, Blanche Mehaffey	Drama	Independent
The Savage Girl	Harry L. Fraser	Rochelle Hudson, Walter Byron, Harry Myers	Adventure	Independent
Scandal for Sale	Russell Mack	Charles Bickford, Rose Hobart, Pat O'Brien	Drama	Universal
Scarface	Howard Hawks	Paul Muni, Ann Dvorak, George Raft	Drama, Crime	United Artists
The Scarlet Brand	J.P. McGowan	Bob Custer, Betty Mack, Robert Walker	Western	Independent
Scarlet Dawn	William Dieterle	Douglas Fairbanks Jr., Nancy Carroll, Lilyan Tashman	Drama	Warner Bros.
A Scarlet Week-End	George Melford	Dorothy Revier, Theodore von Eltz, Phyllis Barrington	Mystery	Independent
Secrets of the French Police	A. Edward Sutherland	Gwili Andre, Gregory Ratoff, Frank Morgan	Crime	RKO
The Secrets of Wu Sin	Richard Thorpe	Lois Wilson, Grant Withers, Dorothy Revier	Mystery	Chesterfield
Self Defense	Phil Rosen	Pauline Frederick, Theodore von Eltz, Barbara Kent	Drama	Monogram
The Seventh Commandment	James P. Hogan	Victoria Vinton, George LeMaire, James Harrison	Crime	Independent
Shanghai Express	Josef von Sternberg	Marlene Dietrich, Anna May Wong, Clive Brook	Adventure, Drama	Paramount
She Wanted a Millionaire	John G. Blystone	Joan Bennett, Spencer Tracy, Una Merkel	Romance	Fox Film
Sherlock Holmes	William K. Howard	Clive Brook, Miriam Jordan, Reginald Owen	Mystery	Fox Film
Shop Angel	E. Mason Hopper	Marion Shilling, Holmes Herbert, Anthony Bushell	Drama	Independent
Shopworn	Nick Grinde	Barbara Stanwyck, Regis Toomey, ZaSu Pitts	Drama, Romance	Columbia
The Sign of the Cross	Cecil B. DeMille	Fredric March, Claudette Colbert, Charles Laughton	Biblical epic	Paramount
The Silent Witness	Marcel Varnel	Lionel Atwill, Greta Nissen, Helen Mack	Drama, Mystery	Fox Film
Silver Dollar	Alfred E. Green	Edward G. Robinson, Bebe Daniels, Aline MacMahon	Drama	Warner Bros.
The Silver Lining	Alan Crosland	Maureen O'Sullivan, Betty Compson, Montagu Love	Comedy	United Artists
Sin's Pay Day	George B. Seitz	Dorothy Revier, Forrest Stanley, Mickey Rooney	Crime	Independent
Single-Handed Sanders	Charles A. Post	Tom Tyler, Margaret Morris, John Elliott	Western	Monogram
Sinister Hands	Armand Schaefer	Jack Mulhall, Phyllis Barrington, Crauford Kent	Mystery	Independent
Sinners in the Sun	Alexander Hall	Carole Lombard, Chester Morris, Adrienne Ames	Drama	Paramount
Sister to Judas	E. Mason Hopper	Claire Windsor, Holmes Herbert, Lee Moran	Drama	Independent
Six Hours to Live	William Dieterle	Warner Baxter, Miriam Jordan, John Boles	Drama	Fox Film
Sky Bride	Stephen Roberts	Richard Arlen, Jack Oakie, Virginia Bruce	Drama	Paramount
Sky Devils	Edward Sutherland, Busby Berkeley	Spencer Tracy, Ann Dvorak, George Cooper	Comedy	United Artists
Skyscraper Souls	Edgar Selwyn	Warren William, Maureen O'Sullivan, Anita Page	Drama	MGM
Slightly Married	Richard Thorpe	Evalyn Knapp, Walter Byron, Marie Prevost	Comedy	Chesterfield
Smilin' Through	Sidney Franklin	Norma Shearer, Fredric March, Leslie Howard	Romance	MGM
So Big	William A. Wellman	Barbara Stanwyck, George Brent, Dickie Moore	Drama, Romance	Warner Bros.
Society Girl	Sidney Lanfield	James Dunn, Peggy Shannon, Spencer Tracy	Drama	Fox Film
The Son-Daughter	Clarence Brown	Helen Hayes, Ramon Novarro, Lewis Stone	Drama	MGM
Son of Oklahoma	Robert N. Bradbury	Bob Steele, Josie Sedgwick, Carmen Laroux	Western	Sono Art
South of Santa Fe	Bert Glennon	Bob Steele, Ed Brady, Eddie Dunn	Western	Sono Art
South of the Rio Grande	Lambert Hillyer	Buck Jones, Mona Maris, Doris Hill	Western	Columbia
Speak Easily	Edward Sedgwick	Buster Keaton, Jimmy Durante, Thelma Todd	Comedy	MGM
Speed Demon	D. Ross Lederman	William Collier Jr., Joan Marsh, Wheeler Oakman	Drama	Columbia
Speed Madness	George Crone	Richard Talmadge, Nancy Drexel, Huntley Gordon	Action	Independent
Spirit of the West	Otto Brower	Hoot Gibson, Doris Hill, Hooper Atchley	Western	Independent
The Sport Parade	Dudley Murphy	Joel McCrea, Marian Marsh, William Gargan	Drama	RKO
State's Attorney	George Archainbaud	John Barrymore, Helen Twelvetrees, William Boyd	Drama	RKO
Steady Company	Edward Ludwig	Norman Foster, June Clyde, ZaSu Pitts	Action	Universal
Stepping Sisters	Seymour Felix	Louise Dresser, Minna Gombell, Jobyna Howland	Comedy	Fox Film
The Stoker	Chester M. Franklin	Monte Blue, Dorothy Burgess, Noah Beery	Drama	Independent
Stowaway	Phil Whitman	Fay Wray, Leon Ames, Montagu Love	Romance	Universal
A Strange Adventure	Phil Whitman	Regis Toomey, June Clyde, Lucille La Verne	Mystery	Monogram
The Strange Case of Clara Deane	Louis J. Gasnier, Max Marcin	Wynne Gibson, Pat O'Brien, Frances Dee	Drama	Paramount
Strange Interlude	Robert Z. Leonard	Norma Shearer, Clark Gable, Robert Young	Drama	MGM
Strange Justice	Victor Schertzinger	Marian Marsh, Reginald Denny, Richard Bennett	Drama	RKO
The Strange Love of Molly Louvain	Michael Curtiz	Ann Dvorak, Lee Tracy, Richard Cromwell	Drama	Warner Bros.
Strangers of the Evening	H. Bruce Humberstone	ZaSu Pitts, Lucien Littlefield, Eugene Pallette	Comedy	Tiffany
Strangers in Love	Lothar Mendes	Fredric March, Kay Francis, Stuart Erwin	Comedy	Paramount
Stranger in Town	Erle C. Kenton	Charles Sale, Ann Dvorak, David Manners	Drama	Warner Bros.
Street of Women	Archie Mayo	Kay Francis, Roland Young, Gloria Stuart	Drama	Warner Bros.
A Successful Calamity	John G. Adolfi	George Arliss, Mary Astor, Evalyn Knapp	Comedy	Warner Bros.
Sundown Rider	Lambert Hillyer	Buck Jones, Barbara Weeks, Pat O'Malley	Western	Columbia
Sunset Trail	B. Reeves Eason	Ken Maynard, Ruth Hiatt, Philo McCullough	Western	Tiffany
Symphony of Six Million	Gregory La Cava	Ricardo Cortez, Irene Dunne, Gregory Ratoff	Drama	RKO
Tangled Destinies	Frank R. Strayer	Gene Morgan, Doris Hill, Glenn Tryon	Thriller	Independent
Tangled Fortunes	J.P. McGowan	Buzz Barton, Caryl Lincoln, Edmund Cobb	Western	Independent
Tarzan the Ape Man	W. S. Van Dyke	Maureen O'Sullivan, Johnny Weissmuller, Neil Hamilton	Adventure	MGM
Taxi!	Roy Del Ruth	James Cagney, Loretta Young, Guy Kibbee	Drama	Warner Bros.
Temptation's Workshop	George B. Seitz	Helen Foster, Tyrell Davis, Dorothy Granger	Drama	Independent
The Tenderfoot	Ray Enright	Joe E. Brown, Ginger Rogers, Vivien Oakland	Comedy, Western	Warner Bros.
Tess of the Storm Country	Alfred Santell	Janet Gaynor, Charles Farrell, June Clyde	Drama	Fox Film
Tex Takes a Holiday	Alan James	Wallace MacDonald, Virginia Brown Faire, Ben Corbett	Western	Independent
The Texan	Clifford Smith	Jay Wilsey, Lucile Browne, Lafe McKee	Western	Independent
The Texas Bad Man	Edward Laemmle	Tom Mix, Lucille Powers, Willard Robertson	Western	Universal
Texas Buddies	Robert N. Bradbury	Bob Steele, Nancy Drexel, Francis McDonald	Western	Sono Art
Texas Cyclone	D. Ross Lederman	Tim McCoy, John Wayne, Shirley Grey	Western	Columbia
Texas Gun Fighter	Phil Rosen	Ken Maynard, Sheila Mannors, Harry Woods	Western	Tiffany
Texas Pioneers	Harry L. Fraser	Bill Cody, LeRoy Mason, Sheila Bromley	Western	Monogram
The Texas Tornado	Oliver Drake	Lane Chandler, Doris Hill, Ben Corbett	Western	Independent
That's My Boy	Roy William Neill	Richard Cromwell, Dorothy Jordan, Mae Marsh	Drama	Columbia
They Call It Sin	Thornton Freeland	Loretta Young, George Brent, David Manners	Drama	Warner Bros.
They Just Had to Get Married	Edward Ludwig	Slim Summerville, ZaSu Pitts, Roland Young	Comedy	Universal
They Never Come Back	Fred C. Newmeyer	Regis Toomey, Dorothy Sebastian, Greta Granstedt	Drama	Independent
Thirteen Women	George Archainbaud	Myrna Loy, Irene Dunne, Ricardo Cortez	Thriller	RKO
The Thirteenth Guest	Albert Ray	Ginger Rogers, Lyle Talbot, J. Farrell MacDonald	Mystery	Monogram
This Is the Night	Frank Tuttle	Roland Young, Thelma Todd, Cary Grant	Comedy	Paramount
This Reckless Age	Frank Tuttle	Charles "Buddy" Rogers, Peggy Shannon, Richard Bennett	Comedy	Paramount
This Sporting Age	Andrew Bennison	Jack Holt, Evalyn Knapp, Walter Byron	Sports	Columbia Pictures
Those We Love	Robert Florey	Mary Astor, Kenneth MacKenna, Lilyan Tashman	Drama	Sono Art
Three on a Match	Mervyn LeRoy	Joan Blondell, Bette Davis, Humphrey Bogart	Drama, Crime	Warner Bros.
Three Wise Girls	William Beaudine	Jean Harlow, Mae Clarke, Marie Prevost	Drama	Columbia
Thrill of Youth	Richard Thorpe	June Clyde, Dorothy Peterson, George Irving	Drama	Chesterfield
Thunder Below	Richard Wallace	Tallulah Bankhead, Charles Bickford, Paul Lukas	Drama	Paramount
Tiger Shark	Howard Hawks	Edward G. Robinson, Richard Arlen, Zita Johann	Drama	Warner Bros.
Tomorrow and Tomorrow	Richard Wallace	Ruth Chatterton, Robert Ames, Paul Lukas	Drama	Paramount
Tom Brown of Culver	William Wyler	Tom Brown, Richard Cromwell, H.B. Warner	Drama	Universal
Tombstone Canyon	Alan James	Ken Maynard, Cecilia Parker, Sheldon Lewis	Western	Sono Art
Too Busy to Work	John G. Blystone	Will Rogers, Marian Nixon, Dick Powell	Comedy	Fox Film
Trailing the Killer	Herman C. Raymaker	Francis McDonald, Heinie Conklin, Pedro Regas	Adventure	Sono Art
Trapped in Tia Juana	Wallace Fox	Edwina Booth, Duncan Renaldo, Dot Farley	Comedy	Independent
The Trial of Vivienne Ware	William K. Howard	Joan Bennett, Donald Cook, Lilian Bond	Drama	Fox Film
Trouble in Paradise	Ernst Lubitsch	Miriam Hopkins, Kay Francis, Herbert Marshall	Romantic comedy	Paramount
Two Against the World	Archie Mayo	Constance Bennett, Neil Hamilton, Helen Vinson	Drama	Warner Bros.
Two-Fisted Law	D. Ross Lederman	Tim McCoy, John Wayne, Alice Day	Western	Columbia
Two Kinds of Women	William C. deMille	Miriam Hopkins, Phillips Holmes, Wynne Gibson	Drama	Paramount
Two Seconds	Mervyn LeRoy	Edward G. Robinson, Vivienne Osborne, Guy Kibbee	Crime	Warner Bros.

== U-V ==
Title	Director	Cast	Genre	Notes
Unashamed	Harry Beaumont	Helen Twelvetrees, Robert Young, Lewis Stone	Drama	MGM
Under-Cover Man	James Flood	George Raft, Nancy Carroll, Lew Cody	Crime	Paramount
The Unexpected Father	Thornton Freeland	Slim Summerville, ZaSu Pitts, Dorothy Christy	Comedy	Universal
Unholy Love	Albert Ray	H. B. Warner, Lila Lee, Joyce Compton	Drama	Independent
Union Depot	Alfred E. Green	Douglas Fairbanks Jr., Joan Blondell, Guy Kibbee	Drama	Warner Bros.
The Unwritten Law	Christy Cabanne, Wilfred Lucas	Greta Nissen, Richard "Skeets" Gallagher, Mary Brian	Mystery	Majestic
Uptown New York	Victor Schertzinger	Jack Oakie, Shirley Grey, Leon Ames	Drama	Sono Art
The Vanishing Frontier	Phil Rosen	Johnny Mack Brown, Evalyn Knapp, Raymond Hatton	Adventure	Paramount
Vanishing Men	Harry L. Fraser	Tom Tyler, Adele Lacy, Raymond Keane	Western	Monogram
Vanity Fair	Chester M. Franklin	Myrna Loy, Conway Tearle, Barbara Kent	Drama	Independent
Vanity Street	Nick Grinde	Charles Bickford, Helen Chandler, Mayo Methot	Crime	Columbia
Virtue	Edward Buzzell	Carole Lombard, Pat O'Brien, Shirley Grey	Romance	Columbia

== W–Z ==
Title	Director	Cast	Genre	Notes
War Correspondent	Paul Sloane	Jack Holt, Ralph Graves, Lila Lee	Action	Columbia
The Washington Masquerade	Charles Brabin	Lionel Barrymore, Karen Morley, Nils Asther	Drama	MGM
Washington Merry-Go-Round	James Cruze	Lee Tracy, Constance Cummings, Walter Connolly	Drama	Columbia
Wayward	Edward Sloman	Nancy Carroll, Richard Arlen, Pauline Frederick	Drama	Paramount
Week Ends Only	Alan Crosland	Joan Bennett, Ben Lyon, Halliwell Hobbes	Romance	Fox Film
Week-End Marriage	Thornton Freeland	Loretta Young, Norman Foster, George Brent	Comedy	Warner Bros.
The Western Code	John P. McCarthy	Tim McCoy, Nora Lane, Mischa Auer	Western	Columbia
Western Limited	Christy Cabanne	Estelle Taylor, Edmund Burns, Lucien Prival	Mystery	Monogram
Westward Passage	Robert Milton	Ann Harding, Laurence Olivier, Juliette Compton	Drama	RKO
The Wet Parade	Victor Fleming	Walter Huston, Robert Young, Myrna Loy	Drama	MGM
What Price Hollywood?	George Cukor	Constance Bennett, Neil Hamilton, Lowell Sherman	Drama	RKO
When a Feller Needs a Friend	Harry A. Pollard	Jackie Cooper, Dorothy Peterson, Ralph Graves	Drama	MGM
While Paris Sleeps	Allan Dwan	Victor McLaglen, Helen Mack, Jack La Rue	Drama	Fox Film
Whistlin' Dan	Phil Rosen	Ken Maynard, Joyzelle Joyner, Georges Renavent	Western	Tiffany
White Eagle	Lambert Hillyer	Buck Jones, Barbara Weeks, Robert Ellis	Western	Columbia
White Zombie	Victor Halperin	Bela Lugosi, Madge Bellamy, Joseph Cawthorn	Horror	United Artists
The Widow in Scarlet	George B. Seitz	Dorothy Revier, Kenneth Harlan, Lloyd Whitlock	Crime	Independent
Wild Girl	Raoul Walsh	Charles Farrell, Joan Bennett, Ralph Bellamy	Drama	Fox Film
Wild Horse Mesa	Henry Hathaway	Randolph Scott, Sally Blane, Fred Kohler	Western	Paramount
Winner Take All	Roy Del Ruth	James Cagney, Marian Nixon, Guy Kibbee	Drama	Warner Bros.
The Wiser Sex	Berthold Viertel	Claudette Colbert, Melvyn Douglas, Lilyan Tashman	Crime	Paramount
Without Honor	William Nigh	Harry Carey, Mae Busch, Gibson Gowland	Western	Independent
A Woman Commands	Paul L. Stein	Pola Negri, Roland Young, Basil Rathbone	Drama	RKO
The Woman from Monte Carlo	Michael Curtiz	Lil Dagover, Walter Huston, Warren William	Drama	Warner Bros.
The Woman in Room 13	Henry King	Elissa Landi, Ralph Bellamy, Myrna Loy	Mystery	Fox Film
Women Won't Tell	Richard Thorpe	Sarah Padden, Otis Harlan, Gloria Shea	Drama	Chesterfield
The World and the Flesh	John Cromwell	George Bancroft, Miriam Hopkins, Alan Mowbray	Drama	Paramount
The Wyoming Whirlwind	Armand Schaefer	Lane Chandler, Adele Lacy, Harry Todd	Western	Independent
You Said a Mouthful	Lloyd Bacon	Joe E. Brown, Ginger Rogers, Preston Foster	Comedy	Warner Bros.
Young America	Frank Borzage	Spencer Tracy, Doris Kenyon, Ralph Bellamy	Drama	Fox Film
Young Blood	Phil Rosen	Bob Steele, Helen Foster, Neoma Judge	Western	Monogram
Young Bride	William A. Seiter	Helen Twelvetrees, Eric Linden, Polly Walters	Drama	RKO

== Shorts ==
Title	Director	Cast	Genre	Notes
The Dentist	Leslie Pearce	W. C. Fields, Marjorie Kane	Comedy	Paramount
Flowers and Trees	Burt Gillett		Animation	
War Babies	Charles Lamont	Shirley Temple, Georgie Smith	Comedy	

== See also ==
- 1932 in the United States
