= Sinister Hands =

1932 film

- DVD cover
- Directed by: Armand Schaefer
- Written by: Oliver Drake (adaptation); Norton S. Parker (story "The Seance Mystery")
- Produced by: Willis Kent (producer) (uncredited)
- Starring: See below
- Cinematography: William Nobles
- Edited by: Ethel Davey
- Release date: 1932
- Running time: 65 minutes
- Country: United States
- Language: English

Sinister Hands is a 1932 American pre-Code film directed by Armand Schaefer.

== Plot ==
A millionaire is murdered at a séance at a fortune-teller's home. Detective Capt Herbert Devlin and Detective Watkins investigate the crime only to discover all attendees have a motive.

== Cast ==
- Jack Mulhall as Detective Capt. Herbert Devlin
- Phyllis Barrington as Ruth Frazer
- Crauford Kent as Judge David McLeod
- Mischa Auer as Swami Yomurda
- Louis Natheaux as Nick Genna
- Gertrude Messinger as Betty Lang
- Lloyd Ingraham as John Frazer
- James P. Burtis as Detective Watkins
- Phillips Smalley as Richard Lang
- Helen Foster as Vivian Rogers
- Lillian West as Mrs. Lang
- Fletcher Norton as Monroe, the Butler
- Bess Flowers as Mary Browne
