= Uncertain Lady =

1934 film

- Theatrical release poster
- Directed by: Karl Freund
- Screenplay by: Daniel Evans; Doris Anderson; Edward A. Curtiss; George O'Neil; Don Ryan
- Produced by: Carl Laemmle, Jr. Dale Van Every
- Starring: Edward Everett Horton; Genevieve Tobin; Paul Cavanagh; Mary Nash; Renee Gadd; Donald Reed
- Cinematography: Charles J. Stumar
- Edited by: Edward Curtiss
- Music by: Edward Ward
- Production company: Universal Pictures
- Distributed by: Universal Pictures
- Release date: April 3, 1934
- Running time: 65 minutes
- Country: United States
- Language: English

Uncertain Lady is a 1934 American comedy film directed by Karl Freund, written by Daniel Evans, Doris Anderson, Edward A. Curtiss, George O'Neil and Don Ryan, and starring Edward Everett Horton, Genevieve Tobin, Paul Cavanagh, Mary Nash, Renee Gadd and Donald Reed. It was released on April 3, 1934, by Universal Pictures.

== Cast ==
- Edward Everett Horton as Elliot Crane
- Genevieve Tobin as Doris Crane
- Paul Cavanagh as Bruce King
- Mary Nash as Edith Hayes
- Renee Gadd as Myra Spaulding
- Donald Reed as Carlos Almirante
- Dorothy Peterson as Cicily Prentiss
- George Meeker as Dr. Alexander Garrison
- Herbert Corthell as Harley
- Arthur Hoyt as Superintendent
- Gay Seabrook as Secretary
- Dick Winslow as Office Boy
- James Durkin as Mr. Weston
