= Heritage of the Desert (1932 film) =

1932 film

- Theatrical release poster
- Directed by: Henry Hathaway
- Screenplay by: Harold Shumate
- Based on: Heritage of the Desert (novel) by Zane Grey
- Produced by: Harold Hurley
- Starring: Randolph Scott; Sally Blane
- Cinematography: Archie Stout
- Production company: Paramount Pictures
- Distributed by: Paramount Pictures
- Release date: September 30, 1932 (USA)
- Running time: 60 minutes
- Country: United States
- Language: English

Heritage of the Desert is a 1932 American Pre-Code Western film directed by Henry Hathaway and starring Randolph Scott and Sally Blane. This was the first movie that Henry Hathaway (director of the original True Grit) directed.

Filmed on location in Red Rock Canyon State Park in California, Heritage of the Desert provided Randolph Scott with his first starring role. Released by Paramount Pictures, the film is a remake of Paramount's successful silent version from 1924 which utilised early two-strip technicolor. One of hundreds of Paramount films made between 1929 and 1949, tied up in legal limbo by Universal which controls them.

== Plot ==
Based on the 1910 novel The Heritage of the Desert by Zane Grey, the film is about a rancher whose spread includes the only way out of the valley where an outlaw is hiding a huge herd of stolen cattle. When the outlaw decides to challenge the rancher's claim to the land, the rancher stays one step ahead of him and hires a surveyor to remap and confirm the property lines.

== Cast ==
- Randolph Scott as Jack Hare
- Sally Blane as Judy
- J. Farrell MacDonald as Adam Naab
- David Landau as Judson "Judd" Holderness
- Gordon Westcott as Snap Naab
- Guinn 'Big Boy' Williams as Lefty
- Vince Barnett as Windy

== See also ==
- List of American films of 1932
