= Under Secret Orders (1933 film) =

1933 film

- Directed by: Sam Newfield
- Written by: Eustace L. Adams
- Produced by: Willis Kent
- Starring: Don Dillaway; Nina Quartero; Phyllis Barrington
- Cinematography: Jules Cronjager
- Edited by: Walter A. Thompson
- Production company: Willis Kent Productions
- Distributed by: Progressive Pictures; Butcher's Film Service (UK)
- Release date: December 6, 1933
- Running time: 60 minutes
- Country: United States
- Language: English

Under Secret Orders is a 1933 American thriller film directed by Sam Newfield and starring Don Dillaway, Nina Quartero and Phyllis Barrington. It was produced on Poverty Row by the independent producer Willis Kent. In Britain it was released by Butcher's Film Service.

== Plot ==
Henry Ames, a San Francisco bank employee, is entrusted with valuable bonds to take to an important client in Central America. On board ship, a revolutionary organization plans to steal the bonds in order to buy weapons and overthrow the government. When the bonds go missing, Ames fears the worst.

== Cast ==
- Don Dillaway as Henry Ames
- J. Farrell MacDonald as John Burke
- Nina Quartero as Carmencita Alverez
- Phyllis Barrington as Jane Lawrence
- Don Alvarado as Don Frederico
- Lafe McKee as Franklyn Lawrence
- Matthew Betz as Senor Cevallos

== Bibliography ==
- Fetrow, Alan G. Sound films, 1927-1939: a United States Filmography. McFarland, 1992.
- Pitts, Michael R. Poverty Row Studios, 1929–1940: An Illustrated History of 55 Independent Film Companies, with a Filmography for Each. McFarland & Company, 2005.
