= The Cheyenne Cyclone =

1931 film

- Directed by: Armand Schaefer
- Written by: Oliver Drake
- Produced by: Willis Kent
- Starring: Lane Chandler; Marie Quillan; Frankie Darro
- Cinematography: William Nobles
- Edited by: Ethel Davey
- Production company: Willis Kent Productions
- Distributed by: First Division Pictures
- Release date: December 15, 1931
- Running time: 57 minutes
- Country: United States
- Language: English

The Cheyenne Cyclone is a 1931 American Western film directed by Armand Schaefer and starring Lane Chandler, Marie Quillan and Frankie Darro. It is a remake of the 1928 silent film Phantom of the Range.

== Plot ==
Carleton and Genevieve are actors who become stranded in a western town. Carleton finds work at a ranch, where he helps the owner and his granddaughter defend their enterprise against cattle rustlers. Carleton captures the culprits by the film's end.

== Cast ==
- Lane Chandler as Bob Carleton
- Marie Quillan as Patsy O'Brien
- Frankie Darro as 'Orphan' McGuire
- Jay Hunt as Patrick O'Brien
- J. Frank Glendon as Dan Fanning
- Connie Lamont as Genevieve - the Actress
- Edward Hearn as J.C. 'Flash' Corbin
- Henry Roquemore as Harrison - the Actor
- Slim Whitaker as Hank - Henchman
- Yakima Canutt as Ed Brady
- Helen Gibson as Townswoman
- Hank Bell as Sheriff

== Production ==
In addition to Schaefer as director, Willis Kent was the producer. Ethel Davey was the editor, Oliver Drake was the screenwriter, and William Nobles was the cinematographer. The film was made on location at Lone Pine, California.

== Bibliography ==
- Michael R. Pitts. Poverty Row Studios, 1929–1940: An Illustrated History of 55 Independent Film Companies, with a Filmography for Each. McFarland & Company, 2005.
