= Donald Reed (actor) =

American actor (1901–73)

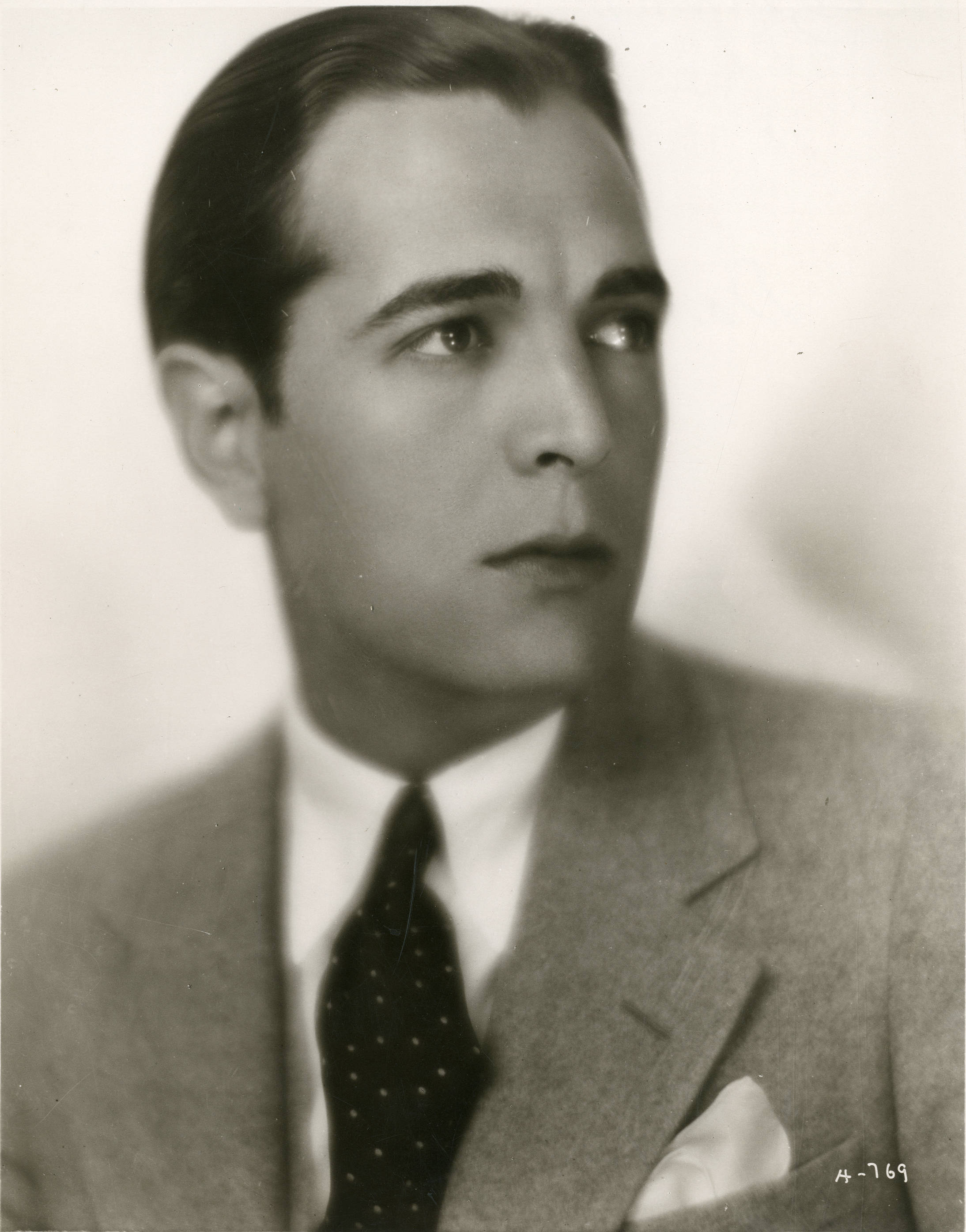
- Reed in 1928
- Born: Ernesto Avila Guillen; July 23, 1901; Mexico City, Mexico
- Died: February 28, 1973 (aged 71); Westwood, Los Angeles, California
- Other name: Ernest Gillen
- Occupation: Actor
- Years active: 1925-1940

Donald Reed (born Ernesto Avila Guillen; July 23, 1901 – February 28, 1973) was a Mexican film actor, and later, Beverly Hills video consultant. He appeared in more than 40 films between 1925 and 1940.

== Biography ==
Reed was born in Mexico City, Mexico as Ernesto Avila Guillen, the son of Alberto Guillen, a shoe merchant. He was educated in Pasadena. His name was changed to Ernest Gillen when he signed with Universal. When he later signed with First National, his name was changed to Donald Reed.

He married the beauty pageant winner Janet Eastman and the two had one daughter together, Joy. He died in Westwood, Los Angeles, California.

== Selected filmography ==
- Any Woman (1925) - Tom Galloway
- His Secretary (1925) - Head Clerk
- The Auction Block (1926) - Carter Lane
- Brown of Harvard (1926) - Reggie Smythe
- Convoy (1927) - Smith's assistant
- Naughty but Nice (1927) - Paul Carroll
- Mad Hour (1928) - Jack Hemingway Jr
- Mark of the Frog (1928)
- Night Watch (1928) - Lieutenant D'Artelle
- Show Girl (1928) - Alvarez Romano
- A Real Girl (1929) - Kyle Stannard
- Evangeline (1929) - Baptiste
- A Most Immoral Lady (1929) - Pedro the Gigolo
- Little Johnny Jones (1929) - Ramon
- Le spectre vert (1930) - Major Mallory
- The Texan (1930) - Nick Ibarra
- Men Without Law (1930) - Ramon del Rey
- Are You There? (1930) - Young Man
- Playthings of Hollywood (1930) - Barry Gaynor
- Aloha (1931) - Kahea
- Hollywood, City of Dreams (1931)
- Santa (1932) - Marcelino
- Soul of Mexico (1932)
- The Racing Strain (1932) - Rival Car Driver
- The Man from Monterey (1933) - Don Luis Gonzales
- The Wolf Dog (1933) - Swanson
- Uncertain Lady (1934) - Carlos Almirante
- Happy Landing (1934) - Paul
- Six Gun Justice (1935) - Marshal Jack McDonald
- The Cyclone Ranger (1935) - Juan Castalar
- The Devil Is a Woman (1935) - 'Cousin' Miguelito (uncredited)
- The Vanishing Riders (1935) - Frank Stanley
- The Fighting Marines (1935, Serial) - Pedro - Henchman
- Darkest Africa (1936, Serial) - Negus [Chs. 11-12]
- Special Agent K-7 (1936) - Billy Westrop
- One Rainy Afternoon (1936) - Minor Role (uncredited)
- Ramona (1936) - Vaquero (uncredited)
- Law and Lead (1936) - Pancho Gonzales, aka The Juarez Kid
- Under Strange Flags (1937) - Garcia
- The Last Train from Madrid (1937) - Husband (uncredited)
- Slaves in Bondage (1937) - Phillip Miller
- The Legion of Missing Men (1937) - Arab (uncredited)
- The Firefly (1937) - French Officer (uncredited)
- Renfrew of the Royal Mounted (1937) - Constable MacDonald
- Juvenile Court (1938) - Reporter (uncredited)
- Midnight (1939) - Ferdinand - Eve's Chauffeur (uncredited)
- Mad Youth (1939) - Club Emcee (uncredited) (final film role)
