= Playthings of Hollywood =

1930 American romantic drama film

- Directed by: William A. O'Connor
- Written by: Ida May Park
- Produced by: Willis Kent
- Starring: Phyllis Barrington; Rita La Roy; Sheila Bromley; Donald Reed
- Cinematography: Henry Cronjager; James Diamond
- Edited by: Thomas Persons
- Production company: Willis Kent Productions
- Distributed by: Hollywood Pictures; Ideal Films (UK)
- Release date: December 29, 1930
- Running time: 81 minutes
- Country: United States
- Language: English

Playthings of Hollywood is a 1930 American romantic drama film directed by William A. O'Connor and starring Phyllis Barrington, Rita La Roy, Sheila Bromley and Donald Reed. Made by the independent producer Willis Kent during the early years of sound, it is also known by the alternative title Chiselers of Hollywood. It was made at the Tec-Art Studio in Hollywood on a very short shooting schedule. Kent originally intended to call the film Gold Diggers of Hollywood but abandoned this after Warner Brothers complained the title was too similar to Gold Diggers of Broadway.

== Plot ==
Three sisters head to Hollywood looking to enjoy success. One of them finds work in the film industry, while two of them fall in love with the same man, the son of a wealthy oil magnate.

== Cast ==
- Phyllis Barrington as Roxanne King
- Rita La Roy as Virginia King
- Sheila Bromley as Beth King
- Donald Reed as Barry Gaynor
- Charles Delaney as Deputy
- Edmund Breese
- Jack Richardson
- Dell Henderson
- Syd Saylor

== Bibliography ==
- Pitts, Michael R. Poverty Row Studios, 1929–1940. McFarland & Company, 2005.
