= E. B. Mann =

American novelist

Edward Beverly Mann (1902 – 1989) was a writer of Westerns in the U.S. Many of his stories were adapted to film. In 1949, he became director of the University of New Mexico Press from 1948 until 1956. The University of Wyoming's American Heritage Center has a collection of his papers.

He put off college and moved to Florida where he later said he worked at a haberdashery. He studied at the University of Florida from 1923 until 1927 and then moved to New York City.

He wrote a school textbook on New Mexico with Fred E. Harvey. He wrote more than 20 novels and was an advocate for the gun and hunting industries. He edited the magazine Guns. He also served as an editor of American Rifleman magazine from 1943 until 1945. He wrote a column for Guns titled "The Mann Says" espousing pro-gun sentiments. He also wrote for Shooting Industry and Field and Stream.

Writing about Mann's novel "With Spurs" (1937), The New York Times commented that Mann "knows how to use the authentic background of the old West" and that he was good at characterization. The Times also called him "the best of the younger writers of western stories". He was inducted into the Osborne County Hall of Fame.

== Bibliography ==
- The Man from Texas
- Stampede
- Shooting Melody
- The Valley of Wanted Men

== Filmography ==
- Stormy Trails
- Lightnin' Crandall
- Guns for Hire (film)
- Guns in the Dark
- The Boss Rider of Gun Creek
- Trail of Vengeance
- Ridin' the Lone Trail
- Range Warfare
- Desert Phantom
- Stampede
