= Phyllis Barrington =

American actress (1907–1996)

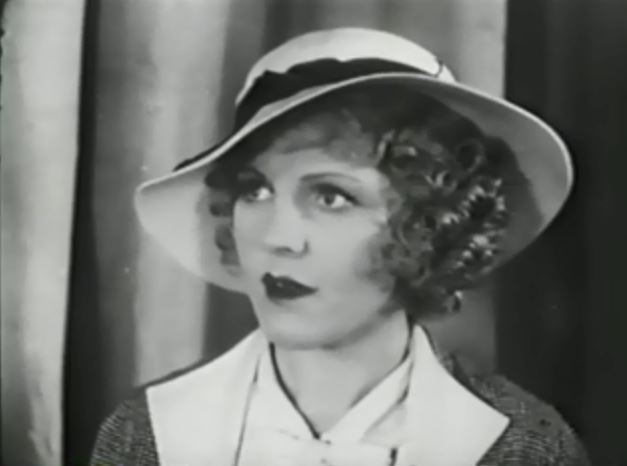
- Born: Clara Otelia Parry; February 7, 1904; Ogden, Utah, U.S.
- Died: June 20, 1989, (aged 85); Los Angeles, California, U.S.

Phyllis Barrington (February 7, 1904 – June 20, 1989) was an American actress. Born Clara Parry and raised in Salt Lake City, she was the daughter of Mr. and Mrs. Parley M. Parry. She was a graduate of Salt Lake's East High School. She danced with the Alexander Oumansky ballet company and then toured in stock companies, where she appeared in such plays as The Second Year and She Got What She Wanted. She attended the Major School of Acting in Long Beach, California and studied voice. A 1931 interview reported her hobbies as landscape drawing and sculpture.

Independent, low-budget producer Willis Kent was impressed by the young actress and signed her to a contract in 1930. Kent changed her professional name from the unpretentious Clara Parry to the more elegant Phyllis Barrington and tried to promote her as an important player. His trade advertisements singled out her starring films in large, bold type as "Phyllis Barrington Specials," the first being Golddiggers of Hollywood, ultimately released as Playthings of Hollywood and Chiselers of Hollywood (1930). Perhaps her most notable credit was Ten Nights in a Bar-Room, the 1931 sound "rematch" of William Farnum and Tom Santschi recreating their epic, barehanded fight scene from the 1914 silent feature The Spoilers. Barrington also appeared in various Willis Kent melodramas, including The Law of the Tong (1931), with John Harron and Jason Robards, Sr., Sinister Hands (1932) with Jack Mulhall, Sucker Money (1933), with Mischa Auer, and her last picture, The Murder in the Museum (1934), with Henry B. Walthall and John Harron. Barrington "appeared" in one last Willis Kent production, the 1936 western Gun Smoke, in which only her photograph was seen.

Barrington also appeared in plays.

Her tenure with Willis Kent guaranteed her steady employment during the Depression years, but it didn't further her career or advance her to more important pictures at major studios. She worked in Willis Kent's minor-league productions exclusively.

At some point before her father's death in 1938, she returned to her birth name and moved to New York City. She died in Los Angeles on June 20, 1989, aged 85.

== Filmography ==
- Playthings of Hollywood (1930)
- The Law of the Tong (1931)
- Ten Nights in a Bar-Room (1931)
- The Drifter (1932)
- Sinister Hands (1932)
- The Reckless Rider (1932)
- A Scarlet Week-End (1932)
- The Racing Strain (1932)
- Sucker Money (1933)
- Under Secret Orders (1933)
- The Murder in the Museum (1934)
