= Open Range (1927 film) =

1927 film

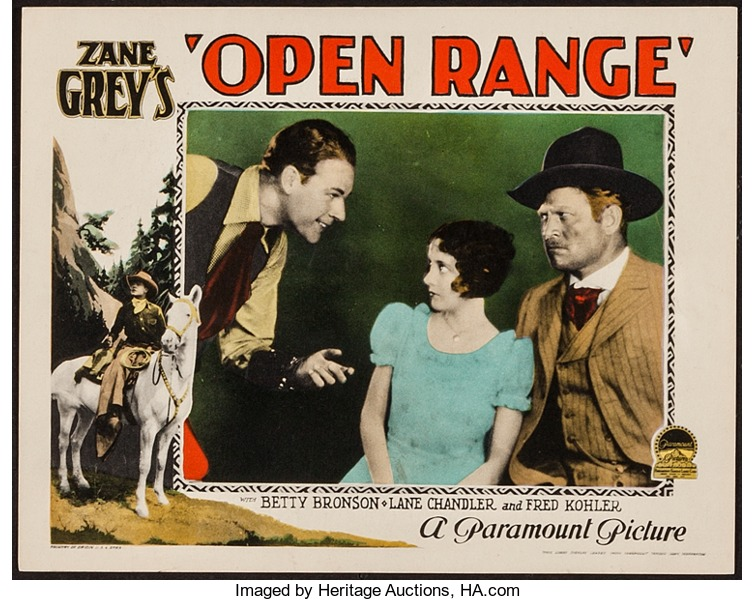
- Directed by: Clifford Smith
- Screenplay by: Roy Briant; Zane Grey; J. Walter Ruben; John Stone
- Produced by: Jesse L. Lasky; Adolph Zukor
- Starring: Betty Bronson; Lane Chandler; Fred Kohler; Bernard Siegel; Guy Oliver; Jim Corey; Buck Connors
- Cinematography: Harold Rosson
- Production company: Famous Players–Lasky Corporation
- Distributed by: Paramount Pictures
- Release date: November 5, 1927
- Running time: 60 minutes
- Country: United States
- Languages: Silent; English intertitles

Open Range is a lost 1927 American silent Western film directed by Clifford Smith and written by Roy Briant, Zane Grey, J. Walter Ruben and John Stone. The film stars Betty Bronson, Lane Chandler, Fred Kohler, Bernard Siegel, Guy Oliver, Jim Corey and Buck Connors. The film was released on November 11, 1927, by Paramount Pictures.

== Plot ==
Hired ranch-hand Tex Smith is smitten with Lucy Blake, who lives in the cattle settlement of Marco. Meanwhile, Indian chief Brave Bear despises the encroachment of white people and conspires with Sam Hardman to steal the town's cattle during a rodeo. Tex is mistakenly identified as one of the rustlers. At the rodeo, he tries to impress Lucy by riding a bronco. When she loses control of her horse team in the buggy race, he rescues her then must evade the sheriff's men. Red and Hardman plan to get Tex before the sheriff gets him, but Lucy, convinced he is innocent, hides him at her ranch. Tex discovers the gang's hideout and forces a confession from Hardman, who warns Brave Bear. When the Indians attack the town, Tex and his men start a cattle stampede, and Tex saves Lucy and her father from their burning house. Hardman dies, after falling on his own knife.

== Cast ==
- Betty Bronson as Lucy Blake
- Lane Chandler as Tex Smith
- Fred Kohler as Sam Hardman
- Bernard Siegel as Brave Bear
- Guy Oliver as Jim Blake
- Jim Corey as Red
- Buck Connors as Sheriff Daley
