= A Real Girl =

1929 film

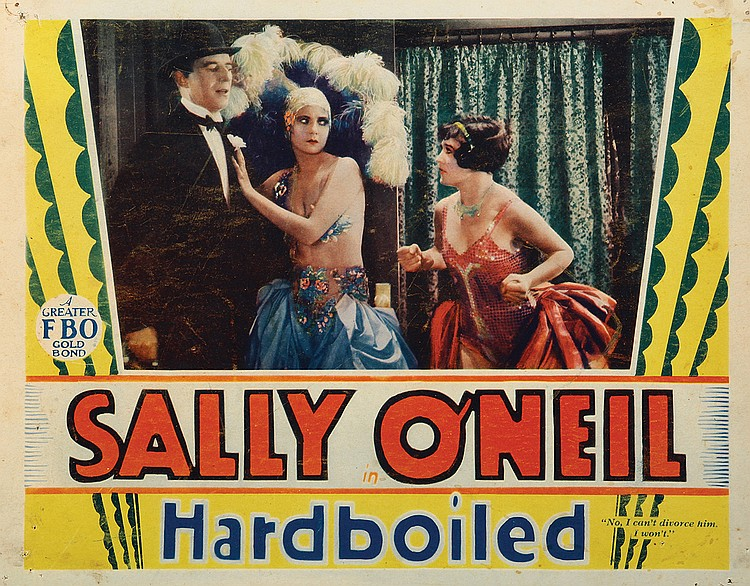
- Directed by: Ralph Ince
- Written by: Ralph Ince; Enid Hibbard
- Cinematography: Robert Martin
- Production company: FBO
- Distributed by: FBO
- Release date: February 3, 1929
- Country: United States
- Languages: Silent; English intertitles

A Real Girl is a 1929 American silent film directed by Ralph Ince and starring Sally O'Neil, Donald Reed and Lilyan Tashman. It is also known by the alternative title of Hardboiled.

== Cast ==
- Sally O'Neil as Teena Johnson
- Donald Reed as Kyle Stannard
- Lilyan Tashman as Minnie
- Bob Sinclair as Scotty
- Ole M. Ness as Warren Kennedy
- Tom O'Grady as Jerry

== Bibliography ==
- Quinlan, David. The Illustrated Guide to Film Directors. Batsford, 1983.
