= The Hurricane Horseman =

1931 film

- Directed by: Armand Schaefer
- Written by: Douglas Dawson; Oliver Drake
- Produced by: Willis Kent
- Starring: Lane Chandler; Marie Quillan; Walter Miller
- Cinematography: William Nobles
- Edited by: Ethel Davey
- Production company: Willis Kent Productions
- Distributed by: Willis Kent Productions
- Release date: October 11, 1931
- Running time: 59 minutes
- Country: United States
- Language: English

The Hurricane Horseman is a 1931 American Western film directed by Armand Schaefer and starring Lane Chandler, Marie Quillan and Walter Miller. It was shot at the Iverson Ranch.

== Cast ==
- Lane Chandler as 'Gun' Smith
- Marie Quillan as Tonita
- Walter Miller as Pancho Gomez
- Yakima Canutt as Sheriff Jones
- Richard Alexander as Bull Carter - Henchman
- Lafe McKee as Don Roberto
- Charles Schaeffer as Cinco - Henchman
- Slim Whitaker as Pedro - Henchman

== Bibliography ==
- Michael R. Pitts. Poverty Row Studios, 1929–1940: An Illustrated History of 55 Independent Film Companies, with a Filmography for Each. McFarland & Company, 2005.
