= Sucker Money =

1933 film

- Directed by: Dorothy Davenport; Melville Shyer
- Written by: Willis Kent
- Produced by: Willis Kent
- Starring: See below
- Cinematography: James Diamond
- Edited by: S. Roy Luby
- Distributed by: Progressive Pictures
- Release date: March 1, 1933
- Running time: 59 minutes
- Country: United States
- Language: English

Sucker Money is a 1933 American Pre-Code film directed by Dorothy Davenport and Melville Shyer. The film is also known as Victims of the Beyond in the United Kingdom.

== Premise ==
A phony spiritualist, Yomurda, uses fake seances and hypnotism to convince a banker's daughter to steal her father's money. He's exposed by a journalist, who turns him over to the police.

== Cast ==
- Mischa Auer as Swami Yomurda
- Phyllis Barrington as Clare Walton
- Earl McCarthy as Jimmy Reeves
- Ralph Lewis as John Walton
- Fletcher Norton as Dan Lukes
- Mae Busch as Mame
- Mona Lisa as Princess Karami
- Al Bridge as George Hunter
- J. Frank Glendon as Meehan
