= The Law of the Tong =

1931 film

- Directed by: Lewis D. Collins
- Written by: Oliver Drake
- Produced by: Willis Kent
- Starring: Phyllis Barrington; John Harron; Jason Robards Sr.
- Cinematography: William Nobles
- Edited by: S. Roy Luby
- Production company: Willis Kent Productions
- Distributed by: Syndicate Film Exchange
- Release date: December 31, 1931
- Running time: 61 minutes
- Country: United States
- Language: English

The Law of the Tong is a 1931 American pre-Code crime film directed by Lewis D. Collins and starring Phyllis Barrington, John Harron and Jason Robards Sr.

== Plot ==
A dance hall hostess becomes mixed up in a gang smuggling illegal immigrants into America.

== Cast ==
- Phyllis Barrington as Joan
- John Harron as Doug
- Jason Robards Sr. as Charlie Wong
- Frank Lackteen as Yuen Lee
- Dot Farley as Madam Duval
- Mary Carr as Mother McGregor
- William Malan as Captain McGregor
- Richard Alexander as Davy Jones
- Wong Chung as Tong Member
- Ben Corbett as First Drunk
- Olin Francis as Dance Hall Customer

== Bibliography ==
- Michael R. Pitts. Poverty Row Studios, 1929–1940: An Illustrated History of 55 Independent Film Companies, with a Filmography for Each. McFarland & Company, 2005.
