= The Drifter (1932 film) =

1932 film

- Directed by: William A. O'Connor
- Written by: Oliver Drake
- Produced by: Willis Kent
- Starring: William Farnum; Noah Beery, Sr.
- Cinematography: William Nobles
- Edited by: Tom Persons
- Production company: Willis Kent Productions
- Distributed by: First Division Pictures
- Release date: January 10, 1932
- Running time: 71 minutes
- Country: United States
- Language: English

The Drifter is a 1932 American pre-Code drama film directed by William A. O'Connor.

== Cast ==
- William Farnum as The Drifter
- Noah Beery, Sr. as John McNary
- Phyllis Barrington as Bonnie McNary
- Charles Sellon as Whitey
- Bruce Warren as Paul LaTour
- Russell Hopton as Montana
- Ann Brody as Marie
- Ynez Seabury as Yvonne
