= Primrose Path (1931 film) =

1931 film

- Directed by: William A. O'Connor
- Produced by: Willis Kent
- Starring: Helen Foster; John Darrow; Dorothy Granger
- Cinematography: Henry Cronjager; Ernest Laszlo
- Edited by: Arthur A. Brooks
- Production company: Willis Kent Productions
- Distributed by: Hollywood Pictures
- Release date: January 25, 1931
- Running time: 71 minutes
- Country: United States
- Language: English

Primrose Path (also written as The Primrose Path) is a 1931 American drama film directed by William A. O'Connor and starring Helen Foster, John Darrow and Dorothy Granger.

== Plot ==
The daughter of a policeman is led astray into a wild life by a star football player at her school, and ends up being expelled. Ashamed she runs away from home, and ends up being tricked into a brothel. She is rescued from it just in time by her former boyfriend, a young motorcycle policeman. Meanwhile, the boy who led her astray dies in a violent car crash after fleeing the law.

== Cast ==
- Helen Foster as Molly Malone
- John Darrow as Buck Randall
- Dorothy Granger as Rita Johnson
- Lane Chandler as Danny McGann
- DeWitt Jennings as Joe Malone
- Mary Carr as Grandmother
- Virginia Pearson as Marie Randeau
- Julia Swayne Gordon as Mrs. Randall

== Bibliography ==
- Pitts, Michael R. Poverty Row Studios, 1929–1940. McFarland & Company, 2005.
