= The Murder in the Museum =

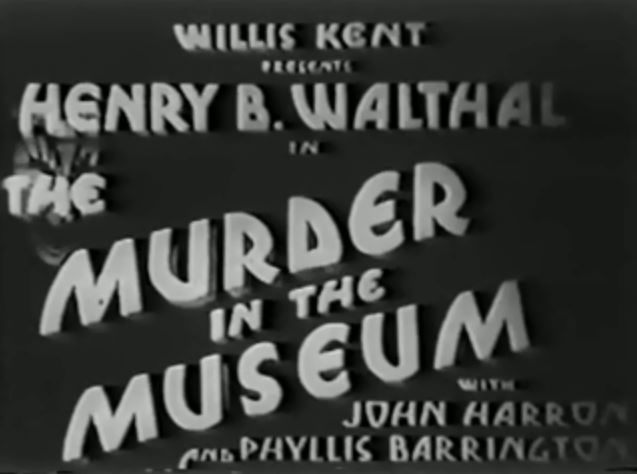
- title sequence screenshot
- Directed by: Melville Shyer
- Written by: F.B. Crosswhite (writer)
- Produced by: Willis Kent (producer)
- Starring: John Harron
- Cinematography: James Diamond
- Edited by: S. Roy Luby
- Production company: Willis Kent Productions
- Distributed by: Marcy Films
- Release date: May 27, 1934
- Running time: 65 minutes
- Country: United States
- Language: English

The Murder in the Museum is a 1934 American film directed by Melville Shyer. The film is also known as The Five Deadly Vices (American reissue title).

== Plot summary ==
A city councilman is murdered while investigating allegations of drug dealing going on at a disreputable sideshow. The daughter of the chief suspect then teams up with a newspaper reporter to find the real killer.

== Cast ==
- Henry B. Walthall as Bernard Latham Wayne, alias Prof. Mysto
- John Harron as Jerry Ross
- Phyllis Barrington as Lois Brandon
- Tom O'Brien as Alfred Carr
- Joseph W. Girard as Police Commissioner Brandon
- Symona Boniface as Katura the Seeress
- Donald Kerr as Museum Tour Guide
- Sam Flint as Councilman Blair Newgate
- John Elliott as Detective Chief Snell
- Steve Clemente as Pedro Darro

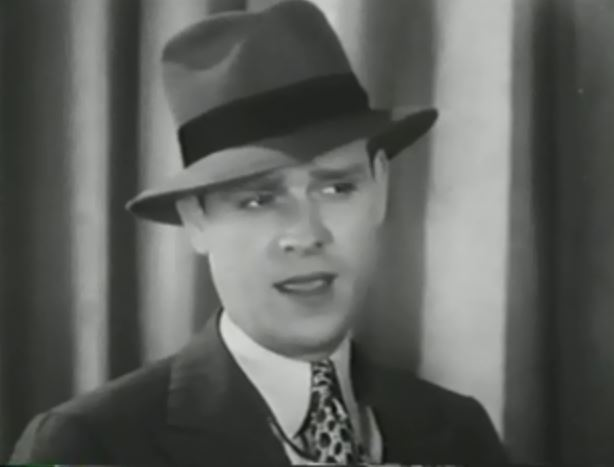
John Harron in The Murder in the Museum (1934)

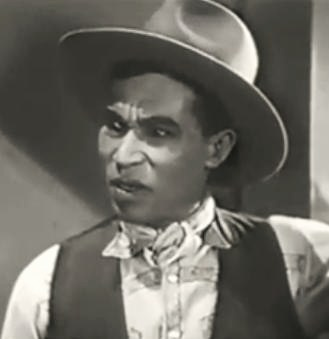
Steve Clemente in Murder in the Museum

== Reuse of film ==
Footage of a belly dancer shot for the film was reused in the 1943 film Confessions of a Vice Baron.
