= The Racing Strain (1932 film) =

1932 film

- Directed by: Jerome Storm
- Written by: Dorothy Davenport (story, uncredited); Betty Burbridge (adaptation) and Willis Kent (adaptation, uncredited)
- Produced by: Willis Kent (producer)
- Starring: See below
- Cinematography: William Nobles
- Edited by: Ethel Davey
- Production company: Willis Kent Productions
- Distributed by: Maxim Productions
- Release date: December 31, 1932
- Running time: 58 minutes
- Country: United States
- Language: English

The Racing Strain is a 1932 American film directed by Jerome Storm.

== Plot summary ==
A race-car driver whose career is on the skids because of his drinking falls for a rich society girl. That motivates him to clean up his act and resume his career, but it may be too late for that.

== Cast ==
- Wallace Reid Jr. as Bill Westcott / "The Big Shot"
- Dickie Moore as Bill Westcott As A Little Boy
- Phyllis Barrington as Marian Martin
- Paul Fix as "King" Kelly
- J. Farrell MacDonald as Mr. Martin
- Eddie Phillips as "Speed" Hall
- Ethel Wales as Aunt Judy
- Otto Yamaoka as Togo
- Mae Busch as Tia Juana Lil
- J. Frank Glendon
- Lorin Raker as Jack Westcott
- Donald Reed
- James P. Burtis
- Kit Guard as King's Mechanic

== Preservation status ==
This film is in the public domain, and is available for free download at the Internet Archive.

== See also ==
- List of films in the public domain in the United States
