= Don Dillaway =

American actor (1903–1982)

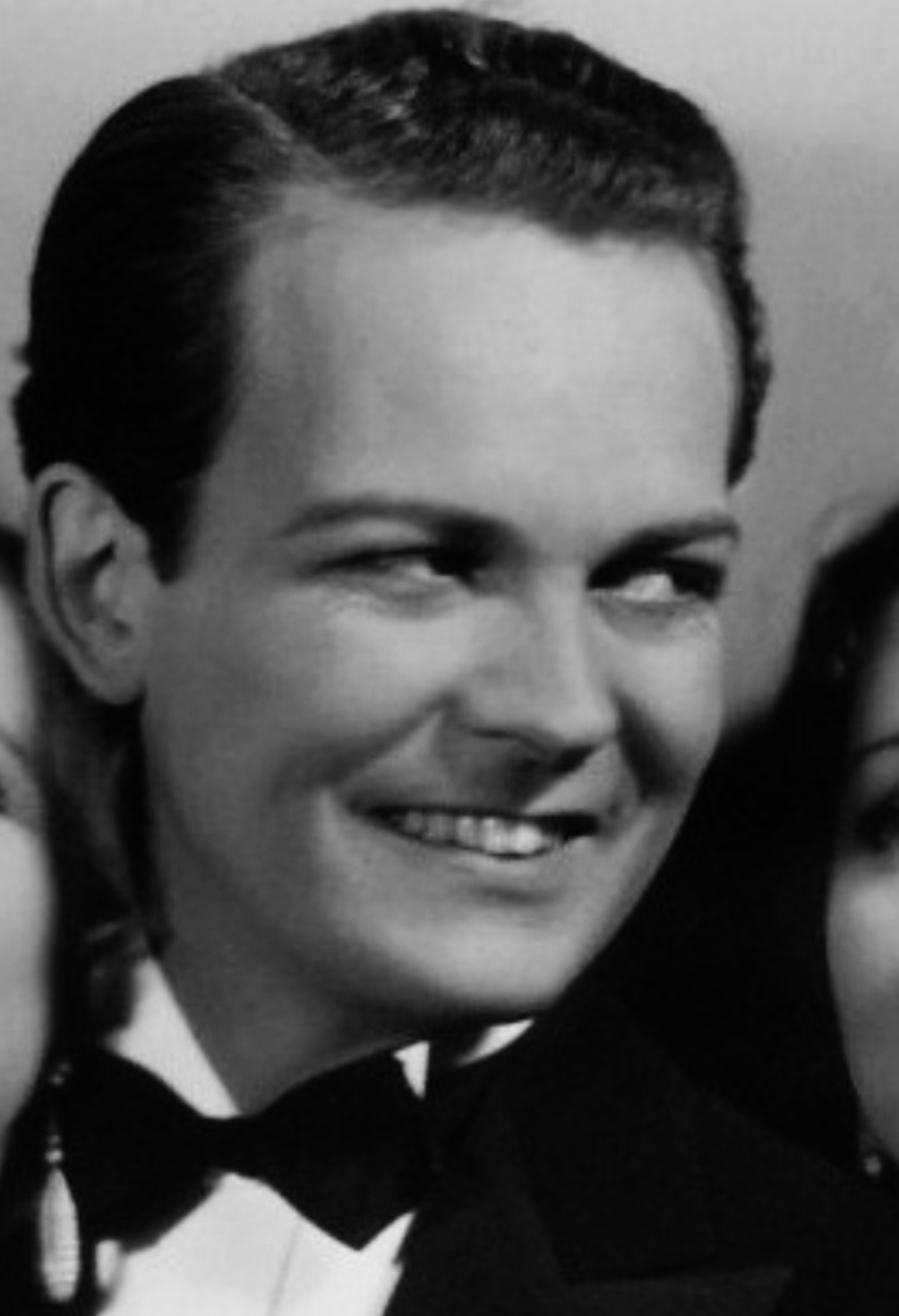
- Dillaway in Young as You Feel (1931)
- Born: Donald Provost Dillaway; March 17, 1903
- Died: November 18, 1982 (aged 79); Westlake Village, California, U.S.
- Resting place: Pierce Brothers Valley Oaks Memorial Park, Westlake Village, California
- Occupation: Actor
- Years active: 1929–1967

Donald Provost Dillaway (March 17, 1903 – November 18, 1982) was an American stage and film actor.

== Early years ==
Dillaway's mother, billed as Nettie Gordon, sang in vaudeville. Because she and his father insisted on a professional career for him, he studied law in Buffalo. He disliked that profession so much, however, that he moved to New York. Eventually his parents accepted his preference for entertaining and encouraged him in that career.

== Career ==
Dillaway had numerous appearances on Broadway. His Broadway debut came in The Backslapper (1925).

In 1927, Dillaway was one of seven actors who were found guilty in New York City of participating in the production of an obscene play, The Virgin Man. They received suspended sentences, and three producers of the play were fined $250 each and sentenced to 10 days in the workhouse.

In 1928, Dillaway acted with the Lakewood Players. He also acted with Otis Skinner in Papa Juan for two seasons.

Dillaway's film debut came in Meet the Widow (1930). He had supporting roles in several films of the 1930s, including Pack Up Your Troubles in 1932, the second feature film from Laurel and Hardy. His roles became gradually smaller in the 1940s and 1950s, usually uncredited bit parts.

His numerous TV appearances include Maverick, Bonanza, Perry Mason, The Munsters, Run for Your Life, Leave It To Beaver and The Big Valley. His final role before retiring in 1967 was in The Wild Wild West.

After he left acting, Dillaway worked as head of RKO's New Talent Department, and he was an agent for actors. Later he had his own real estate agency.

== Death ==
He died in Westlake Village, California at age 79. He was buried in Pierce Brothers Valley Oaks Memorial Park, Westlake Village, California.

== Filmography ==
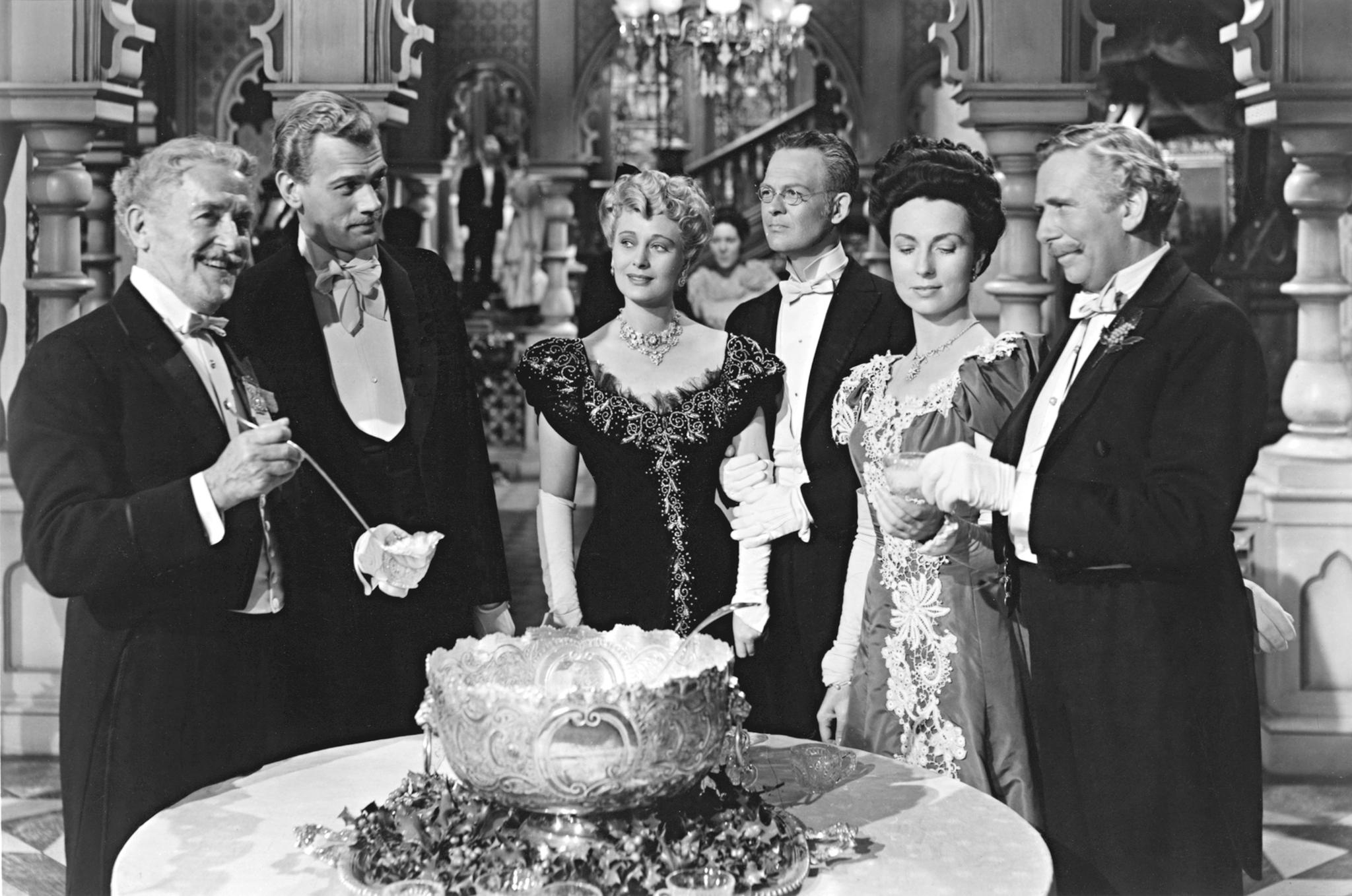
Richard Bennett, Joseph Cotten, Dolores Costello, Don Dillaway, Agnes Moorehead and Ray Collins in The Magnificent Ambersons (1942)

- The Interview (1929) as The Cub Reporter (film debut)
- Cimarron (1931) as Adult Cim (uncredited)
- Young as You Feel (1931) as Billy Morehouse
- Platinum Blonde (1931) as Michael Schuyler
- Men in Her Life (1931) as Dick Webster
- The Night Mayor (1932) as Fred Field
- Pack Up Your Troubles (1932) as Eddie Smith
- The Animal Kingdom (1932) as Joe Fiske
- Cross-Examination (1932) as David Wells
- Attorney for the Defense (1932) as Paul Wallace
- The Important Witness (1933) as Steve Connors
- The Little Giant (1933) as Gordon Cass
- Marriage on Approval (1933) as Larry Bennett
- Under Secret Orders (1933) as Henry Ames
- The Circus Clown (1934) as Jack
- Cipher Bureau (1938) as Paul Waring
- Horror Island (1941) as Sailor (uncredited)
- The Postman Didn't Ring (1942) as Reporter (uncredited)
- The Magnificent Ambersons (1942) as Wilbur Minafer (uncredited)
- Over My Dead Body (1942) as Reporter
- Gangway for Tomorrow (1943) as Frank Danielson
- Gunmen of Abilene (1950) as Bill Harper
- Plymouth Adventure (1952) - Stephen Hopkins
- The Caine Mutiny (1954) as George (uncredited)
- Tarantula (1955) as Jim Bagny (uncredited)
- Alfred Hitchcock Presents (Season 1 Episode 39: "Momentum") (1956) as Policeman
- Sunrise at Campobello (1960) as Sloan (uncredited)
- The Absent Minded Professor (1961) as Defense Department Secretary (uncredited)
- Back Street (1961) as Cleve (final film, uncredited)
