= The Reckless Rider =

1932 film

- Directed by: Armand Schaefer
- Written by: Oliver Drake
- Produced by: Willis Kent
- Starring: Lane Chandler; Phyllis Barrington; Neal Hart
- Cinematography: William Nobles
- Edited by: S. Roy Luby
- Production company: Willis Kent Productions
- Distributed by: Willis Kent Productions
- Release date: July 1, 1932
- Running time: 55 minutes
- Country: United States
- Language: English

The Reckless Rider is a 1932 American western film directed by Armand Schaefer and starring Lane Chandler, Phyllis Barrington and Neal Hart. It was a loose remake of the 1928 FBO Pictures film When the Law Rides also written by Oliver Drake.

== Plot ==
'Tex' Wilkins confronts a masked night rider who is threatening the inhabitants of a town.

== Cast ==
- Lane Chandler as 'Tex' Wilkins
- Phyllis Barrington as Mary Jones
- J. Frank Glendon as Parson Jones
- Neal Hart as John Lamar
- Patrick Rooney as 'Butch' Harbin
- G. Raymond Nye as 'Wheezer' Bill
- Bartlett A. Carre as Ole
- Ben Corbett as Benny
- Franklyn Farnum as Sheriff
- Arthur Thalasso as Bartender
- Raven the Horse as Raven - Tex's Horse

== Bibliography ==
- Pitts, Michael R. Western Movies: A Guide to 5,105 Feature Films. McFarland, 2012.
