= The Night Mayor =

1932 film

- Directed by: Benjamin Stoloff
- Written by: Samuel Marx; Gertrude Purcell
- Starring: Jack Holt; Noah Beery; Cecilia Callejo
- Cinematography: Ted Tetzlaff
- Edited by: Maurice Wright
- Production company: Columbia Pictures
- Distributed by: Columbia Pictures
- Release date: August 19, 1932
- Running time: 65 minutes
- Country: United States
- Language: English

The Night Mayor is a 1932 American pre-Code drama film directed by Benjamin Stoloff and starring Lee Tracy, Evalyn Knapp and Don Dillaway.

== Cast ==
- Lee Tracy as Mayor Bobby Kingston
- Evalyn Knapp as Doree Dawn
- Don Dillaway as Fred Field
- Eugene Pallette as Hymie Shane
- Vince Barnett as Louis Mossbaum, Tailor
- Warren Hymer as Riley
- Astrid Allwyn as Patsy
- Barbara Weeks as Nutsy
- Gloria Shea as Gwen

uncredited performers

- Wade Boteler as Grogan
- Wallis Clark as Crandall
- Emmett Corrigan as Lt. Governor Robertson
- Eddie Foster as Reporter
- Sherry Hall as Bill
- Eddie Kane as Larry Sigmund
- Frank McLure as Ritz Hotel Waiter
- Harold Minjir as Ashley Sparks
- Edmund Mortimer as Dignitary
- Tom O'Brien as Delaney
- Larry Steers as Mayor's Attendee

== Bibliography ==
- Palmer, Scott. British Film Actors' Credits, 1895-1987. McFarland, 1998.
