= A Scarlet Week-End =

1932 film

- Directed by: George Melford
- Written by: Oliver Drake
- Based on: The Woman in Purple Pajamas by Wilson Collison
- Produced by: Willis Kent
- Starring: Dorothy Revier; Theodore von Eltz; Phyllis Barrington
- Cinematography: William Nobles
- Edited by: Ruth Wright
- Production company: Willis Kent Productions
- Distributed by: Maxim Productions
- Release date: September 23, 1932
- Running time: 63 minutes
- Country: United States
- Language: English

A Scarlet Week-End is a 1932 American mystery film directed by George Melford and starring Dorothy Revier, Theodore von Eltz and Phyllis Barrington. It was made as a second feature on Poverty Row by the independent producer Willis Kent. It is an adaptation of the 1931 novel The Woman in Purple Pajamas by Wilson Collison.

== Plot ==
A couple host a weekend party at their country estate. Their guests include two married lovers of the womanizing host. When he begins flirting with another young woman all become jealous of him. The wife's former fiancée begs her leave her husband and come away with him. Later that evening her husband is murdered, and his bloody pyjamas in her bedroom seems to point to her guilt.

== Cast ==
- Dorothy Revier as The Wife
- Theodore von Eltz as The Husband
- Phyllis Barrington as The Girlfriend
- Douglas Cosgrove as The Police Inspector
- Sheila Terry as Marjorie Murphy
- Niles Welch as The Wife's Former Fiancée
- Nora Hayden as Maid
- Virginia Roye as Alma McGregor

== Bibliography ==
- Fetrow, Alan G. . Sound films, 1927-1939: a United States Filmography. McFarland, 1992.
- Pitts, Michael R. Poverty Row Studios, 1929–1940: An Illustrated History of 55 Independent Film Companies, with a Filmography for Each. McFarland & Company, 2005.
