= The Wyoming Whirlwind =

1932 film

- Directed by: Armand Schaefer
- Written by: Alan Ludwig; Wallace MacDonald; Oliver Drake
- Based on: Shootin' Square by William Colt MacDonald
- Produced by: Willis Kent
- Starring: Lane Chandler; Adele Lacy; Harry Todd
- Cinematography: William Nobles
- Edited by: Ethel Davey
- Production company: Willis Kent Productions
- Distributed by: Willis Kent Productions
- Release date: December 30, 1932
- Running time: 55 minutes
- Country: United States
- Language: English

The Wyoming Whirlwind is a 1932 American western film directed by Armand Schaefer and starring Lane Chandler, Adele Lacy and Harry Todd. It was produced by the independent Willis Kent as a second feature

== Plot ==
Outlaw Keene Wallace, known as The Wolf, is escaping with a payroll he has stolen when the stagecoach is attacked by Native warriors. He persuses them to return to their Reservation, saving his fellow passenger Judy Flagg in the process.

== Cast ==
- Lane Chandler as Keene Wallace aka The Wolf
- Adele Lacy as Judy Flagg
- Harry Todd as Sheriff Joe Flagg
- Loie Bridge as Mrs. Molly Flagg, Sheriff's Wife
- Yakima Canutt as Henchman Jackson
- Al Bridge as Steve Cantrell
- Bob Roper as Henchman Brute
- Harry Semels as Henchman Pete
- Lafe McKee as Elder Townsman
- Olin Francis as Bartender
- Hank Bell as Henchman Hank
- Raven the Horse as Raven, Keene's Horse

== Bibliography ==
- Pitts, Michael R. Western Movies: A Guide to 5,105 Feature Films. McFarland, 2012.
