= Law and Lawless =

1932 film directed by Armand Schaefer

- Directed by: Armand Schaefer
- Written by: Oliver Drake
- Produced by: Henry L. Goldstone; Larry Darmour
- Starring: Jack Hoxie; Julian Rivero; Yakima Canutt
- Cinematography: William Nobles
- Edited by: S. Roy Luby
- Production company: Larry Darmour Productions
- Distributed by: Majestic Pictures
- Release date: November 30, 1932
- Running time: 62 minutes
- Country: United States
- Language: English

Law and Lawless is a 1932 American pre-Code western film directed by Armand Schaefer and starring Jack Hoxie, Julian Rivero, and Yakima Canutt. It was released on November 30, 1932, by Majestic Pictures.

== Plot ==
Gunfighter Montana and his sidekick, Gonzales, find that a ranch foreman is behind a series of cattle rustlings. They are put in jail for an alleged shooting, but they escape, find the foreman again, and make him take them to his boss.

== Cast ==
- Jack Hoxie as Montana
- Hilda Moreno as Rosita Lopez
- Julian Rivero as Pancho Gonzales
- Yakima Canutt as Tex Barnes
- Jack Mower as Don Roberto Lopez
- Hal Taliaferro as Buck Daggett (credited as Wally Wales)
- Frank Glendon (credited as J. Frank Glendon)
- Edith Fellows as Betty Kelly
- Bob Burns as Mr. Kelley
- Helen Gibson as Molly
- Al Taylor as Steve - Foreman (uncredited)
- William Quinn as Pete (uncredited)
