= Cross-Examination (film) =

1932 film

- Directed by: Richard Thorpe
- Written by: Arthur Hoerl
- Produced by: Louis Weiss
- Starring: H. B. Warner; Sally Blane; Natalie Moorhead
- Cinematography: M. A. Anderson
- Edited by: Holbrook N. Todd
- Production company: Supreme Films
- Distributed by: Weiss Brothers
- Release date: February 14, 1932
- Running time: 74 minutes
- Country: United States
- Language: English

Cross-Examination is a 1932 American drama film directed by Richard Thorpe and starring H. B. Warner, Sally Blane and Natalie Moorhead.

== Plot ==
A defense attorney tries to prove the innocence of his client on a murder charge, despite witness after witness testifying against him. However, during a cross examination of a crucial witness, the lawyer is able to establish the real truth.

== Cast ==
- H. B. Warner as Gerald Waring - Defense Attorney
- Sally Blane as Grace Varney
- Natalie Moorhead as Inez Wells
- Edmund Breese as Dwight Simpson - Prosecuting Attorney
- Don Dillaway as David Wells
- William V. Mong as Emory Wells
- Sarah Padden as Mary Stevens
- Niles Welch as Warren Slade
- Wilfred Lucas as Judge William J. Hollister

== Bibliography ==
- Monaco, James. The Encyclopedia of Film. Perigee Books, 1991.
