= Battling Buckaroo =

1932 film

- Directed by: Armand Schaefer
- Written by: Oliver Drake
- Produced by: Willis Kent
- Starring: Lane Chandler; Doris Hill; Yakima Canutt
- Cinematography: James Diamond
- Edited by: S. Roy Luby
- Production company: Willis Kent Productions
- Distributed by: Willis Kent Productions
- Release date: December 30, 1932
- Running time: 55 minutes
- Country: United States
- Language: English

Battling Buckaroo is a 1932 American western film directed by Armand Schaefer and starring Lane Chandler, Doris Hill and Yakima Canutt.

== Plot ==
A young outlaw Jack Winslow steps in to rescue a Mexican woman and her father who are being for their gold threatened by a gang.

== Cast ==
- Lane Chandler as Jack Winslow
- Doris Hill as Tonia Mendoza
- Yakima Canutt as Sheriff Rawlins
- Lafe McKee as Senor Felipe Mendoza
- Bill Patton as Duke Lawson
- Ted Adams as Pedro
- Olin Francis as Deputy Bull Saunders
- Bartlett A. Carre as Henchman
- Pat Harmon as Mexican Barfly
- Cliff Lyons as Barfly
- Raven the Horse as Raven - Jack's Horse

== Bibliography ==
- Pitts, Michael R. Western Movies: A Guide to 5,105 Feature Films. McFarland, 2012.
