= Guns for Hire (film) =

1932 film

- Directed by: Lewis D. Collins
- Written by: Oliver Drake; E. B. Mann
- Produced by: Willis Kent
- Starring: Lane Chandler; Sally Darling; Neal Hart
- Cinematography: James Diamond
- Edited by: S. Roy Luby
- Production company: Willis Kent Productions
- Distributed by: Hollywood Film Exchange
- Release date: September 1, 1932
- Running time: 58 minutes
- Country: United States
- Language: English

Guns for Hire is a 1932 American Western film directed by Lewis D. Collins and starring Lane Chandler, Sally Darling and Neal Hart.

== Plot ==
Gunfighter Wayne helps Thornton, who has been erroneously accused of killing a card shark. While doing so, Wayne encounters a gang led by his foster father (Carlyle), who is working with a cattle rancher and the sheriff to take control of the sheep ranch owned by Thornton and his father.

== Cast ==
- Lane Chandler as Flip LaRue - aka Ken Wayne
- Sally Darling as Sue Thornton
- Neal Hart as Whispering Carlyle
- Yakima Canutt as Sheriff Pete Peterson
- John Ince as Matt Thornton
- Slim Whitaker as Hank Moran
- Jack Rockwell as Monk Weaver
- Ben Corbett as Fatso Gans
- Steve Clemente as Flash Gomez - aka Gunnison
- Bill Patton as Joe Patron
- Hank Bell as Duke Monahan
- John McGuire as Jim Thornton
- Frances Morris as Polly Clark
- Nelson McDowell as inquest official
- John Bacon as Frank Lloyd
- Ed Porter as Dr. Peter Bartlett

== Production notes ==
Interior scenes were filmed at Talisman Studio in Hollywood, with location shooting at Lone Pine, California.
