= Lane Chandler =

American actor (1899–1972)

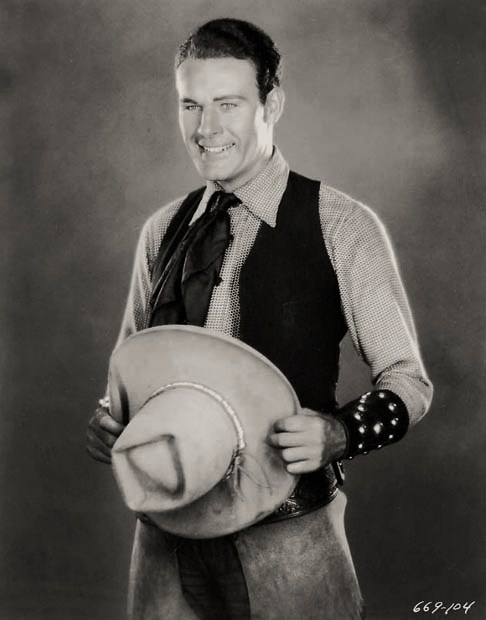
- Chandler in Open Range (1927)
- Born: Robert Clinton Oakes; June 4, 1899; Pisek, North Dakota, U.S.
- Died: September 14, 1972 (aged 73); Los Angeles, California, U.S.
- Resting place: Hollywood Forever Cemetery Hollywood, California
- Years active: 1921–1971

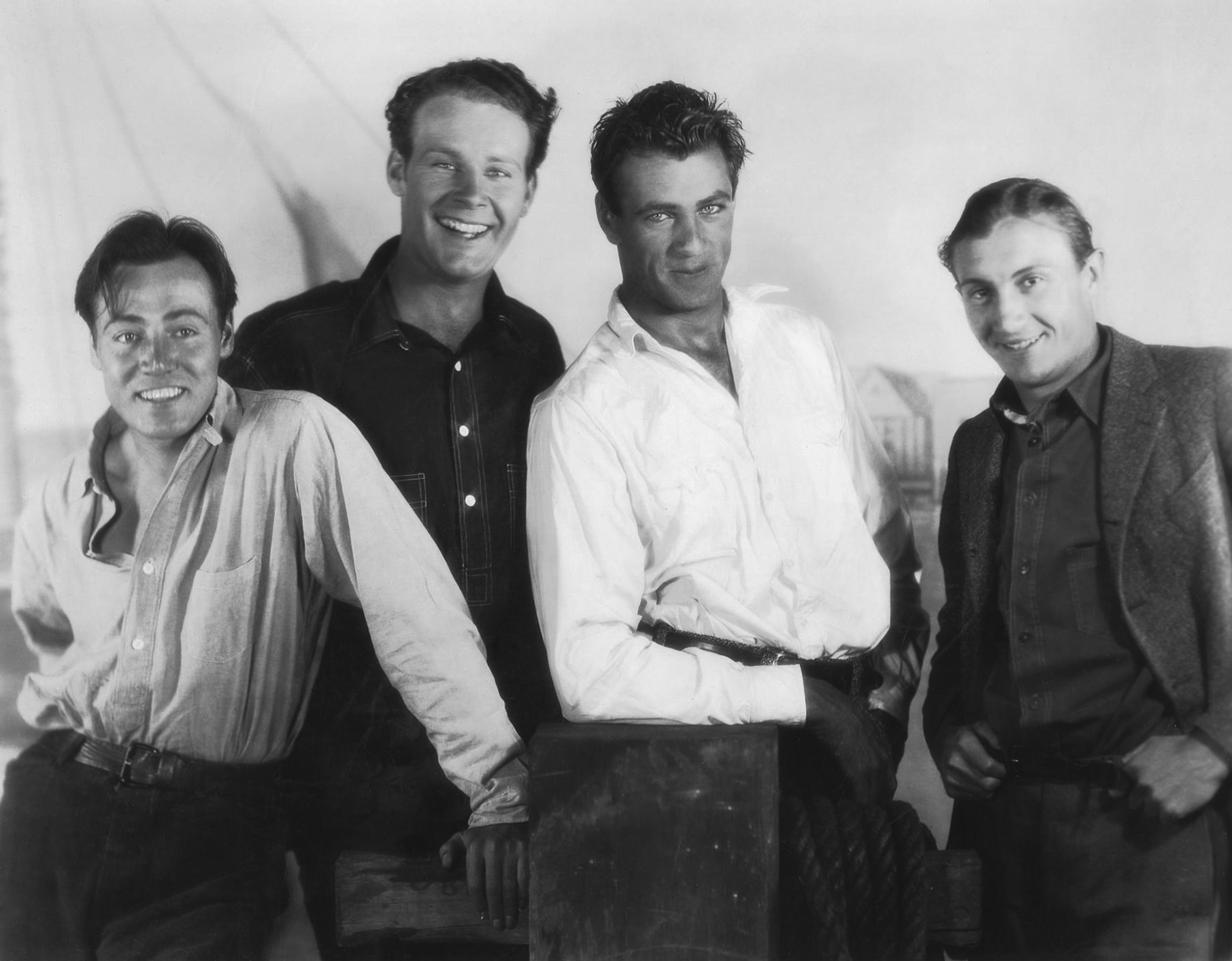
Leslie Fenton, Chandler, Gary Cooper and director Rowland V. Lee during The First Kiss (1928)

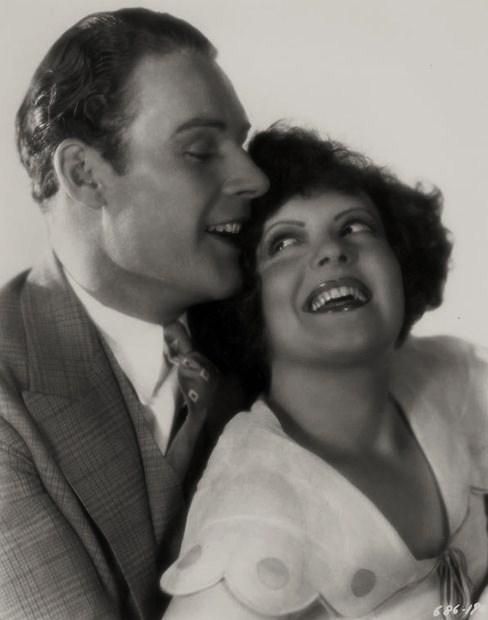
Chandler and Clara Bow in Red Hair (1928)

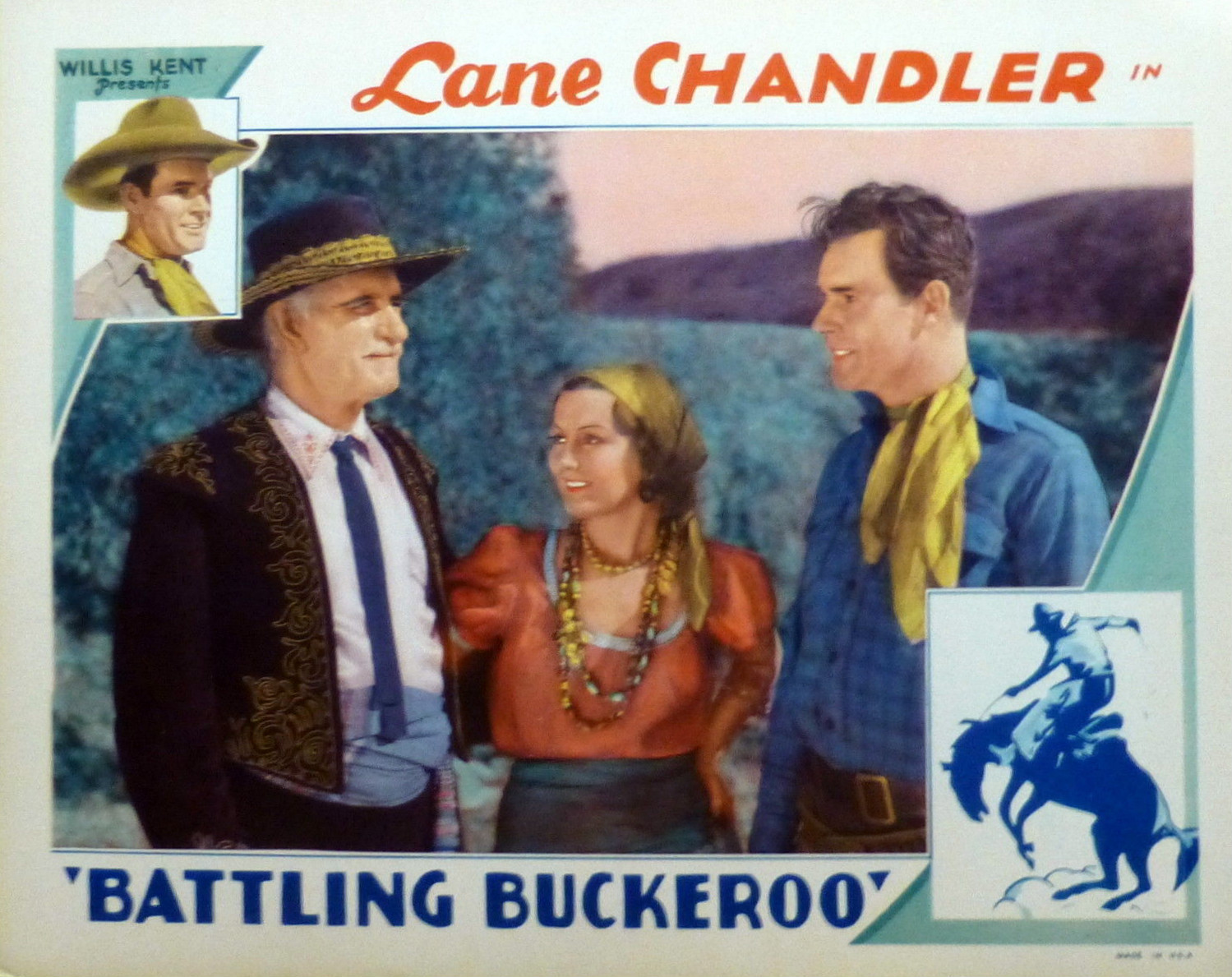
Battling Buckaroo (1932) lobby card with Lafe McKee, Doris Hill and Chandler

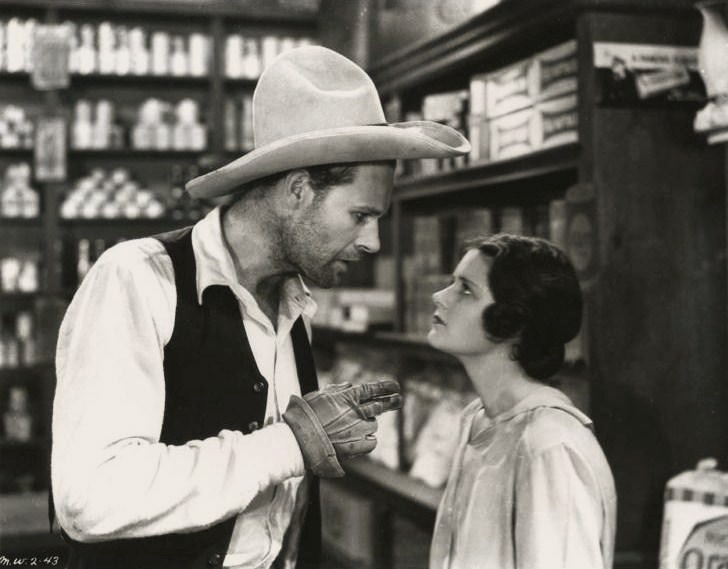
Chandler and Nancy Schubert in Sagebrush Trail (1933)

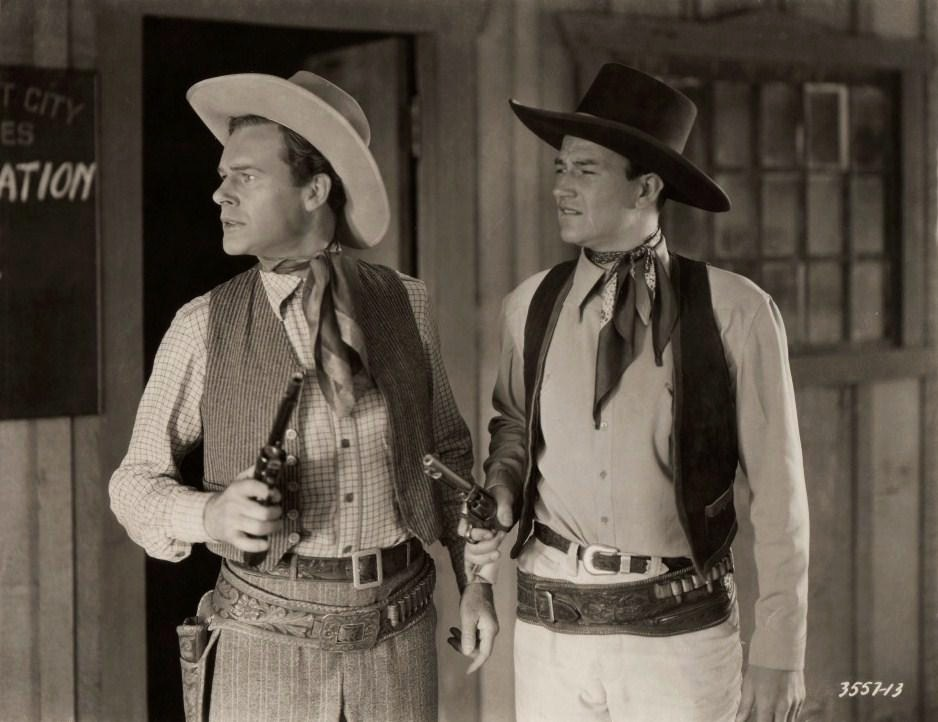
Chandler and John Wayne in Winds of the Wasteland (1936)

Chandler later in career

Lane Chandler (born Robert Clinton Oakes, June 4, 1899 – September 14, 1972) was an American actor specializing mainly in Westerns.

== Biography ==
=== Early life ===
Chandler was raised on a ranch near Culbertson, Montana, the son of a horse rancher. The family relocated to Helena, Montana, when he was a youngster, and he graduated from high school there. He briefly attended Montana Wesleyan College, but quit to drive a tour bus at Yellowstone National Park.

=== Career ===
In the early 1920s, he moved to Los Angeles, California, and started working as an auto mechanic. His real-life experiences growing up on a horse ranch landed bit parts for him in westerns from 1925, for Paramount Pictures. Studio executives suggested changing his name to Lane Chandler, and as such he began achieving leading roles opposite stars like Clara Bow, Greta Garbo, Betty Bronson and Esther Ralston. His first lead role was in The Legion of the Condemned.

As a silent film star, Chandler performed well, but when talkies arrived he was cast more in supporting roles, as in The Great Mike of 1944. He starred in a few low-budget westerns in the 1930s, but was more often cast as the leading man's partner, or saddle pal, or a sheriff or army officer. Many of his films featured alliterative titles such as Riders of the Rio (1931), Primrose Path (1931), The Cheyenne Cyclone (1931), The Hurricane Horseman (1931), Battling Buckaroo (1932), The Wyoming Whirlwind (1932), The Reckless Rider (1932), The Texas Tornado (1932), and Sagebrush Trail with John Wayne; all but two of these films starred Chandler top-billed with his name above the title. With the advent of television Chandler began making appearance on numerous series, often in Westerns such as The Lone Ranger, The Adventures of Wild Bill Hickok, Lawman, Have Gun – Will Travel, Rawhide, Maverick, Cheyenne, and Gunsmoke (as "Trumbull" in the S7E10 titled "Indian Ford" in 1961 & as "Luke" in the S8E8's "The Trappers" in 1962); many of these TV series appearances were bit parts with no billing at all. He continued acting on TV and in films through 1966, retiring comfortably due to his holdings in both residential and commercial properties.

He died in Los Angeles of heart disease in 1972, aged 73.

== Selected filmography ==
- The Last Outlaw (1927) – Rancher (uncredited)
- Open Range (1927) – Tex Smith
- Love and Learn (1928) – Anthony Cowles
- Red Hair (1928) (with Clara Bow) – Robert Lennon
- The Legion of the Condemned (1928) (with Fay Wray and Gary Cooper) – Charles Holabird
- The Big Killing (1928) – George Hicks
- The First Kiss (1928) (with Fay Wray and Gary Cooper) – William Talbot
- The Wolf of Wall Street (1929) – (uncredited)
- The Studio Murder Mystery (1929) – Bill Martin (uncredited)
- The Single Standard (1929) (with Greta Garbo) – Ding Stuart
- The Forward Pass (1929) – "Assistant Coach Kane"
- Firebrand Jordan (1930) – Firebrand Jordan
- The Lightning Express (1930, Serial) – Jack Venable
- Rough Waters (1930) – Cal Morton
- Beyond the Law (1930) – Jack-Knife
- Under Texas Skies (1930) – Singer Martin, Secret Service Agent
- Riders of the Rio (1931) - Bob Lane
- Primrose Path (1931) - Danny McGann
- The Cheyenne Cyclone (1931) - Bob Carleton
- The Hurricane Horseman (1931) - 'Gun' Smith
- Guns for Hire (1932) - Flip LaRue, aka Ken Wayne
- Battling Buckaroo (1932) - Jack Winslow
- The Reckless Rider (1932) - 'Tex' Wilkins
- The Wyoming Whirlwind (1932) - Keene Wallace
- Lawless Valley (1932) - Bob Rand
- The Texas Tornado (1932) - Tex Robbins
- Sagebrush Trail (1933) (with John Wayne and Yakima Canutt) - Joseph Conlon, aka Bob Jones
- Via Pony Express (1933) - Lieutenant Bob Grey
- War of the Range (1933) - Bull Harris, Henchman
- Trouble Busters (1933) - Jim Perkins
- The Outlaw Tamer (1935) - 'Tex' Broderick
- Idaho Kid (1936) - Jess Peters
- The Magnificent Brute (1936) - Steelworker (uncredited)
- Winds of the Wasteland (1936) (with John Wayne) - Larry Adams
- Heroes of the Alamo (1937) – Davy Crockett
- Come On, Rangers (1938) - Ken Rogers
- Flash Gordon's Trip to Mars (1938, Serial) – Flight Commander [Chs. 2–3]
- Two Gun Justice (1938) - Butch, Henchman
- The Man in the Iron Mask (1939) - Captain of Fouquet's Guards
- The Taming of the West (1939) - Turkey (uncredited)
- Hi-Yo Silver (1940)
- Arabian Nights (1942) – Majordomo (uncredited)
- Wild Horse Rustlers (1943) - Smoky Moore / Hans Beckmann
- Law of the Saddle (1943) - Steve Kinney
- Rustlers' Hideout (1944) - Hammond
- Terror Trail (1946) - Duke Catlett (uncredited)
- Behind Prison Walls (1946)
- Gunning for Vengeance (1946) - Jim Clayburn (uncredited)
- The Vigilantes Return (1947) - Messenger
- Cattle Queen (1951) - Marshal Houston
- The Hawk of Wild River (1952) - George, Storekeeper (uncredited)
- Thunder Over the Plains (1953) (with Randolph Scott and Phyllis Kirk) - Mike Faraday
- Border River (1954) (with Joel McCrea and Yvonne De Carlo) - Anderson
- Alfred Hitchcock Presents (1955) (Season 1 Episode 7: "Breakdown") - Sheriff
- Quantrill's Raiders (1958) - Sheriff Alden
