= The Texas Tornado (1932 film) =

1932 film

- Directed by: Oliver Drake
- Written by: Oliver Drake
- Produced by: Willis Kent
- Starring: Lane Chandler; Doris Hill; Ben Corbett
- Cinematography: James Diamond
- Edited by: S. Roy Luby
- Production company: Willis Kent Productions
- Distributed by: William Steiner
- Release date: April 1, 1932
- Running time: 53 minutes
- Country: United States
- Language: English

The Texas Tornado is a 1932 pre-Code American Western film directed by Oliver Drake and starring Lane Chandler, Doris Hill and Ben Corbett.

== Cast ==
- Lane Chandler as Tex Robbins - Posing as Wolf Cassidy
- Doris Hill as Ruth O'Byrne
- Ben Corbett as Texas Ranger Shorty Walker
- J. Frank Glendon as Three Star Henley
- Edward Hearn as Fanner Durkin
- Yakima Canutt as Jackson - Henchman
- Bartlett A. Carre as Slim - O'Byrne Ranch Cook
- Wes Warner as Pete - Henchman
- Fred Burns as Sheriff
- Slim Whitaker as Henchman
- Mike Brand as Wolf Cassidy

== Bibliography ==
- Pitts, Michael R. Western Movies: A Guide to 5,105 Feature Films. McFarland, 2012.
