= Willis Kent =

American film producer

Willis Kent (June 8, 1878, Michigan – March 11, 1966, Los Angeles, California) was an independent American film producer, active from 1928 to 1958 under at least three different corporate names.

Willis Kent Productions was active during the 1930s. Its films, about 40 in all, consisted mostly of low-budget B-westerns, many of which starred short-lived cowboy star and former football player Lafayette "Reb" Russell, along with a few melodramatic police and mystery films.

During the 30s, and well into the 1940s, Kent also produced several cheap, sensationalist exploitation features under the banner of Real Life Dramas. That company's first release, The Pace That Kills (1928), was about innocent young teens being lured into the netherworld of cocaine addiction. Kent remade it, using the same title and same director, adapted with sound, in 1935. In some markets it was retitled as Cocaine Fiends, which is the title used on most VHS and DVD copies of the film.

In the 1950s, he also produced a number of filmed burlesque dance numbers released as short subjects, and often later edited into feature-length compilations, under the corporate name of Billiken Pictures.

For at least two releases in the mid-'30s Kent joined forces with Dorothy Davenport, who had forged her own career in early exploitation films following the death of her husband, the morphine-addicted star Wallace Reid.

Most of these films are now in the public domain.

== Partial filmography ==
- The Pace That Kills (1928)
- The Road to Ruin (1928)
- Playthings of Hollywood (1930)
- Ten Nights in a Barroom (1931)
- The Hurricane Horseman (1931)
- The Law of the Tong (1931)
- The Cheyenne Cyclone (1931)
- Primrose Path (1931)
- The Drifter (1932)
- Guns for Hire (1932)
- Lawless Valley (1932)
- The Reckless Rider (1932)
- The Texas Tornado (1932)
- The Racing Strain (1932)
- The Wyoming Whirlwind (1932)
- A Scarlet Week-End (1932)
- Battling Buckaroo (1932)
- Under Secret Orders (1933)
- Sucker Money (1933)
- Her Splendid Folly (1933)
- The Murder in the Museum (1934)
- The Road to Ruin (1934)
- The Woman Condemned (1934)
- Fighting Through (1934)
- The Man from Hell (1934)
- Arizona Bad Man (1935)
- Blazing Guns (1935)
- Outlaw Rule (1935)
- The Cheyenne Tornado (1935)
- Lightning Triggers (1935)
- Cocaine Fiends (1935)
- Smashing the Vice Trust (1937)
- The Wages of Sin (1938)
- Race Suicide (1938)|
- Mad Youth (1940)
- Souls in Pawn (1940)
- Confessions of a Vice Baron (1943) (assembled from previously released films of the studio)
