= Armand Schaefer =

Canadian film producer

- Born: 5 August 1898; Tavistock, Ontario, Canada
- Died: 26 September 1967 (aged 69)
- Occupations: Film producer Film director
- Years active: 1931–1956

Armand Schaefer (5 August 1898 – 26 September 1967) was a Canadian film producer and director. He produced more than 100 films between 1932 and 1953. He also directed 24 films between 1931 and 1946. He was born in Tavistock, Ontario, Canada. From 1955 to 1956, he joined Gene Autry as co-executive producers of the Dickie Jones western television series Buffalo Bill, Jr.

== Selected filmography ==
- The Cheyenne Cyclone (1931 - directed)
- The Hurricane Horseman (1931 – directed)
- The Lightning Warrior (1931 – directed)
- The Hurricane Express (1932 – directed)
- The Wyoming Whirlwind (1932 – directed)
- Law and Lawless (1932 – directed)
- Outlaw Justice (1932 – directed)
- The Reckless Rider (1932 – directed)
- Battling Buckaroo (1932 – directed)
- Fighting with Kit Carson (1933 – directed)
- Sagebrush Trail (1933 – directed)
- The Three Musketeers (1933 – directed)
- Mystery Mountain (1934 – produced)
- The Lost Jungle (1934 – directed)
- Burn 'Em Up Barnes (1934 – directed)
- The Miracle Rider (1935 – directed)
- The Phantom Empire (1935 – produced)
- Yodelin' Kid from Pine Ridge (1937 – produced)
- Exiled to Shanghai (1937)
- Storm Over Bengal (1938)
- Mercy Island (1941-produced)
- The Girl from Alaska (1942)
- Don't Fence Me In (1945)
- Scotland Yard Investigator (1945)
- The Last Round-up (1947)
- The Strawberry Roan (1948 – produced)
- The Blazing Sun (1950)
- The Hills of Utah (1951)
- The Old West (1952)
