= Oliver Drake (filmmaker) =

American screenwriter and film director

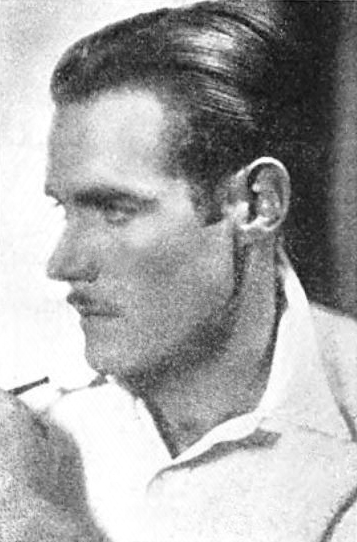
- Born: May 28, 1903; Boise, Idaho, US
- Died: August 19, 1991 (aged 88); Las Vegas, Nevada, US
- Occupation(s): Film/television director, screenwriter, producer, actor
- Years active: 1922–1955

Clarence Oliver Drake (May 28, 1903 – August 19, 1991) was an American film/television director, screenwriter, producer and actor who was most active in the Western genre. Though Drake began his career as an actor, he is best known as a prolific screenwriter and director of low-budget Western films (sometimes referred to as B-Westerns). Drake was most active in the 1930s and 1940s, although he continued writing and directing films until 1974.

His films include Today I Hang (1942).

== Selected filmography ==
- Red Blood and Blue (1925)
- Cyclone of the Range (1927)
- The Cherokee Kid (1927)
- The Flying U Ranch (1927)
- The Boy Rider (1927)
- The Desert Pirate (1927)
- Red Riders of Canada (1928)
- When the Law Rides (1928)
- Phantom of the Range (1928)
- The Little Buckaroo (1928)
- Driftin' Sands (1928)
- Orphan of the Sage (1928)
- The Pinto Kid (1928)
- The Drifter (1929)
- The Vagabond Cub (1929)
- The Cheyenne Cyclone (1931)
- The Law of the Tong (1931)
- The Hurricane Horseman (1931)
- West of Cheyenne (1931)
- Law and Lawless (1932)
- Battling Buckaroo (1932)
- The Reckless Rider (1932)
- The Scarlet Brand (1932)
- A Scarlet Week-End (1932)
- The Wyoming Whirlwind (1932)
- Lawless Valley (1932)
- Guns for Hire (1932)
- The Texas Tornado (1932)
- Via Pony Express (1933)
- War of the Range (1933)
- Gun Law (1933)
- Trouble Busters (1933)
- Fighting Through (1934)
- Arizona Bad Man (1935)
- The Cyclone Ranger (1935)
- Lightning Triggers (1935)
- The Cheyenne Tornado (1935)
- West of Texas (1937)
- Nation Aflame (1937)
- Arizona Legion (1939)
- Shut My Big Mouth (1942)
- The Lone Star Trail (1943)
- Riders of the Dawn (1945)
- The Lonesome Trail (1945)
- Ginger (1946)
- Moon Over Montana (1946)
- Deadline (1948)
- Across the Rio Grande (1949)
- Trail of the Yukon (1949)
- Battling Marshal (1950)
- Outlaw Treasure (1955)
- The Parson and the Outlaw (1957)
