= Vera Wade =

American film editor

- Born: 1905; Iowa, United States
- Died: Unknown
- Occupation: Film editor

Vera Wade was an American film editor active in the early 1930s.

== Biography ==
Vera was born in Iowa in 1905, and her father was from England. According to census records, she was divorced and living in Los Angeles in 1930. Around that time, she was under contract at Invisible Pictures at Universal Studios. It's unknown what happened to her after 1933, and her last known credit was on 1933's Forgotten.

== Selected filmography ==
- Forgotten (1933)
- Strange People (1933)
- The Secrets of Wu Sin (1932)
- Women Won't Tell (1932)
- The King Murder (1932)
- Thrill of Youth (1932)
- Beauty Parlor (1932)
- The Midnight Lady (1932)
- Beautiful and Dumb (1932)
- Probation (1932)
