= Thrill of Youth =

1932 film

- Directed by: Richard Thorpe
- Written by: Edward T. Lowe Jr.
- Produced by: George R. Batcheller
- Starring: June Clyde; Dorothy Peterson
- Cinematography: M.A. Anderson
- Edited by: Vera Wade
- Production company: Invincible Pictures
- Distributed by: Chesterfield Pictures
- Release date: August 15, 1932
- Running time: 60 minutes
- Country: United States
- Language: English

Thrill of Youth is a 1932 American Pre-Code drama film directed by Richard Thorpe and starring June Clyde and Dorothy Peterson.

== Cast ==
- June Clyde as Jill Fenwick
- Allen Vincent as Jack Thayer
- Dorothy Peterson as Seena Sherwood
- George Irving as Jeff Thayer
- Matty Kemp as Chet Thayer
- Lucy Beaumont as Grandma Thayer
- Tom Ricketts as Grandpa Zachary Thayer
- Caryl Lincoln as Marcia Dale
- Ethel Clayton as Alice Fenwick
- Bryant Washburn as Colby Sherwood

== Bibliography ==
- Pitts, Michael R. Poverty Row Studios, 1929-1940. McFarland & Company, 2005.
