= David Durand (actor) =

American actor

- Born: David Parker Grey; July 27, 1920; Cleveland, Ohio
- Died: July 25, 1998 (aged 77); Bridgeview, Illinois
- Occupation: Actor

David Durand (born David Parker Grey, July 27, 1920 – July 25, 1998) was an American juvenile actor.

== Career ==
Durand made his screen debut in the 1927 silent film Get Your Man. He appeared in the silent film Tropic Madness (1928); only a 14-minute fragment survives, discovered in 2022 and now available on YouTube on the Rainscratch channel.

In 1930 Durand appeared with stage star Belle Baker in the Columbia Pictures backstage drama Song of Love. His natural delivery of dialogue launched him on a steady screen career at both major and minor studios. His child-actor credits include Bad Sister, The Spy, Rich Man's Folly, Probation, Forbidden Company, Silver Dollar, The Great Jasper, Son of the Border, The Life of Jimmy Dolan, Jennie Gerhardt, Cradle Song, As the Earth Turns, Viva Villa!, Hat, Coat, and Glove, Wednesday's Child, Little Men, and The Band Plays On.

Having outgrown child roles, Durand became a familiar face in teenage stories, including Scouts to the Rescue, Streets of New York, and Boys' Reformatory. His most representative credit of the late 1930s was a leading role (without billing) as a rebellious teen in MGM's Crime Does Not Pay short subject A Criminal Is Born (1938).

David Durand is perhaps best known today for his prominence in two film series. In 1940 he was chosen as the lead in Columbia's Glove Slingers series of two-reel comedies. These films, showing the comic misadventures of a promising young prizefighter, were produced by the same staff that made Columbia's popular Three Stooges and Buster Keaton comedies. Durand's eight shorts featured the same slapstick comedy content but in a lighter, situation-comedy vein befitting Durand's youthful character. Durand continued in the series through 1942, when he joined the United States Army.

When he returned to Hollywood, the army had transformed his trim frame into a husky build. He joined Monogram's East Side Kids, replacing series regular Bobby Jordan. Durand's final film was Follow the Leader (1944), after which he worked behind the scenes in the movie business.

== Personal life ==
He died on July 25, 1998, in Bridgeview, Illinois at age 77. His daughter, Judi Durand, is a voice artist on numerous motion pictures and video games.
