= Symphony of Living =

1935 film by Frank R. Strayer

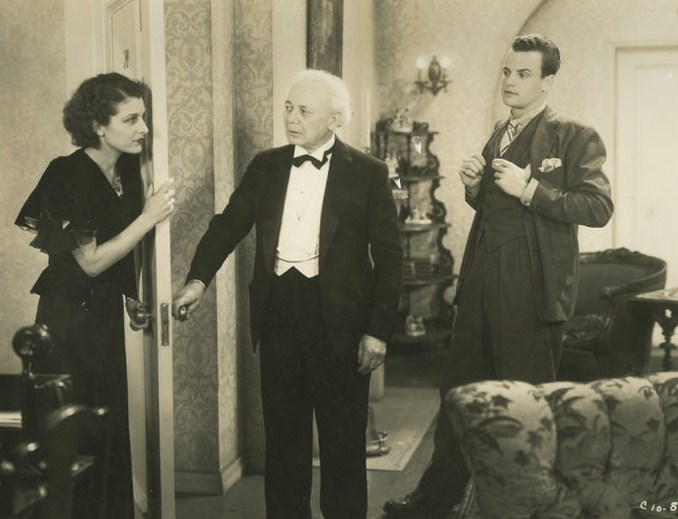
- Evelyn Brent, Al Shean and John Darrow in Symphony of Living
- Directed by: Frank R. Strayer
- Written by: Charles Belden
- Produced by: Maury M. Cohen
- Cinematography: M.A. Anderson
- Edited by: Roland D. Reed
- Production company: Invincible Pictures
- Distributed by: Chesterfield Pictures
- Release date: January 20, 1935
- Running time: 75 minutes
- Country: United States
- Language: English

Symphony of Living is a 1935 American film directed by Frank R. Strayer and starring Evelyn Brent.

== Plot summary ==
There is this old concertmaster of the Cosmopolitian Orchestra and he is about to realize his life-long ambition of appearing as a soloist with the orchestra, when an accident robs him of use of his right hand. His children, upon learning of his misfortune, immediately desert him knowing he will no longer provide them with money. So Adolph Greig sinks lower and lower and becomes a street beggar, too proud to ask for help from his friends and unable to find his son or daughter. One night, standing in front of the concert hall, he sinks to the street from hunger and fatigue. He is picked up by two men associated with the orchestra, Mancini and Rozzini, and they take him to Rozzini's and they develop a plan whereby they will set up Greig in a next-door studio where he can give violin lessons. A young violin genius named Carl Rupert shows up and, with the aid of Mancini and Rozzini, Greig starts the boy off on a brilliant career. Or, what promised to be a brilliant career until his long-lost mother shows up.

== Cast ==
- Evelyn Brent as Paula Greig Rupert
- Al Shean as Adolph Greig
- Charles Judels as Rozzini
- John Darrow as Richard Greig
- Albert Conti as Mancini
- Lester Lee as Carl Rupert
- Gigi Parrish as Carmen Rozzini
- Richard Tucker as Michael Rupert
- John Harron as Herb Livingston
- Ferike Boros as Mary Schultz
- Ferdinand Schumann-Heink as The Doctor
- Carl Stockdale as The Judge
- William Worthington as Symphony Chairman
- Leslie Goodwins as Oboe Player
- Gregory Golubeff as Max - a Violinist
- Demetrius Alexis as The Music Lover
