= Paul F. Ruckert =

Paul F Ruckert
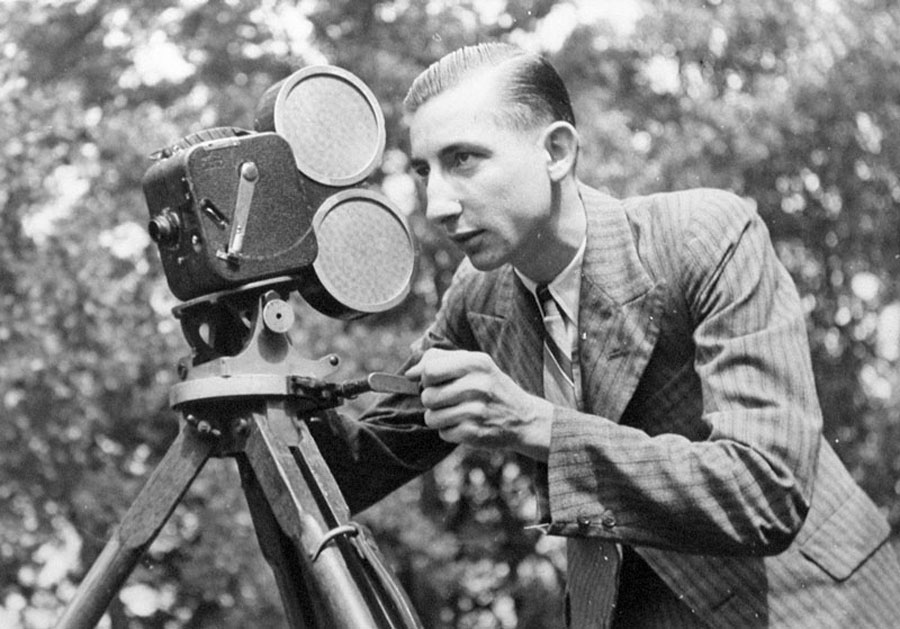
- Paul Ruckert in the mid-1930s filming with his modified 35mm Ica-Kinamo camera.
- Born: 25 December 1913; Toowoomba, Queensland
- Died: 4 March 2006 (aged 92); Brisbane, Queensland
- Occupations: Film Producer, Cinematographer, Signwriter

Paul Ruckert (25 December 1913 – 4 March 2006) was an Australian film producer and cinematographer. He was active between 1930 and 1980 and produced a wide variety of short films and documentaries under the banner of Invincible Pictures. The films included comedies, travelogues, natural history documentaries and commercials. While not achieving huge financial success with his ventures his films were sold and distributed widely within Australia and overseas. In 1999 he was recognised for his lifelong contributions with a one-hour special by Ray Martin at the end of Channel 9's "Our Century" series, as he supplied a lot of historical footage for that program.

== Personal life and career ==
He was born in Toowoomba on 25 December 1913 and spent his early childhood there until the family moved to East Brisbane in 1921. After his education at the East Brisbane primary school he was apprenticed as a signwriter. He had an early fascination with film and photography, purchasing his first cameras in his teens. The area underneath his parents home at East Brisbane was soon converted into a small theatrette and signwriting workshop.

Trips to the local cinemas were always a highlight, and Paul finally convinced the owner of the Triumph Cinema in East Brisbane to give him part-time work. This was the first in a succession of jobs in Brisbane suburban and city cinemas as a projectionist and manager. These theatres included the Triumph, Tivoli, Hawthorne, Kelvin Grove, Windsor and the Broadway at Woolloongabba. All this time Paul was building his signwriting career as well, becoming predominantly a poster artist supplying posters, daybills and other promotional material to Brisbane's then flourishing cinema trade. His posters were used by cinemas throughout the greater Brisbane area, country Queensland and northern New South Wales.

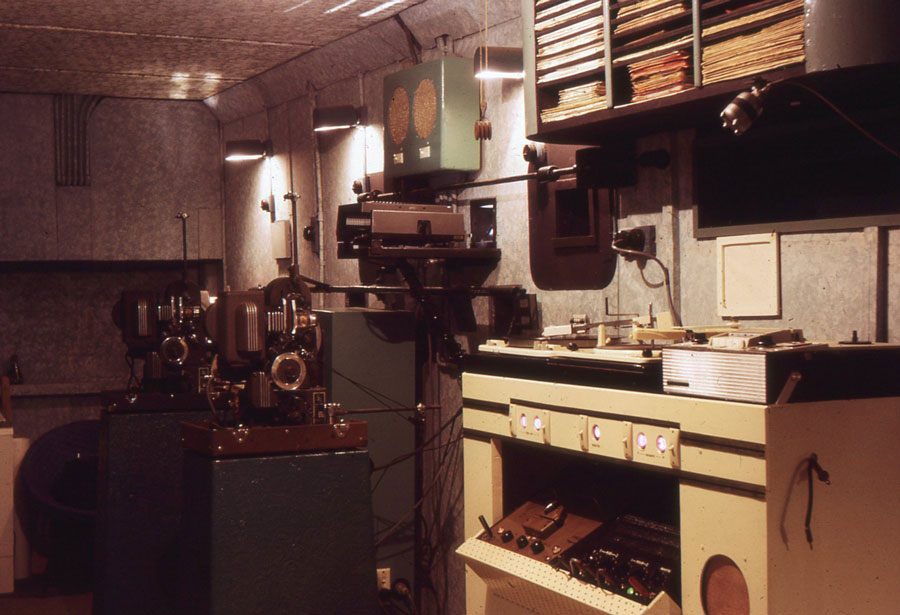
Invincible Pictures "Vogue Theatrette" projection booth in 1968 with two Harmour and Heath 16mm projectors

He married wife Iris in 1942 and they built their family home in Norman Park which included space for his signwriting business, a 32-seat theatrette and various studio areas for film production including a darkroom, sound proof recording booth, film vault and editing bench. The darkroom was equipped with custom home-made units for duplicating and processing 16mm black and white film. Initially colour film was also processed in this darkroom, but for later productions the services of Kinelab in Sydney were enlisted for sound recording and print processing. Commentary was provided by some of Australia's best narrators including Peter Gwynne and Kevin Golsby. The theatrette was initially fitted with 35mm arc projectors, but was later converted to 16mm, initially with two Australian made Harmour & Heath units then later with four Eiki projectors, two complete with CinemaScope anamorphic lenses projecting onto a 3.6-metre screen.

Invincible Pictures Trademark

His early movie making was the normal amateur fare, but he very soon progressed to making more serious efforts, including short newsreels and travelogues which he sold for local distribution and screening in Brisbane cinemas. He created the studio name of Invincible Pictures. His first films, none of which survive, were shot in 35mm, but he soon went to 16mm format becoming a dedicated fan of the Swiss made Paillard Bolex cameras. A significant early 16mm production was "Beauty Spots around Brisbane", released in 1939 and shot in colour. These historic images are still being used to this day by local television stations when period footage is required. There were also short comedies, no doubt influenced by the likes of Mack Sennett, Pete Smith and others. These films, notably "The Little Menace" and "Handyman" achieved some commercial success with many copies being sold for distribution in Australia and overseas. In later years wife Iris made a significant contribution to Paul's productions, writing a lot of the scripts and helping greatly in many areas of the production process.

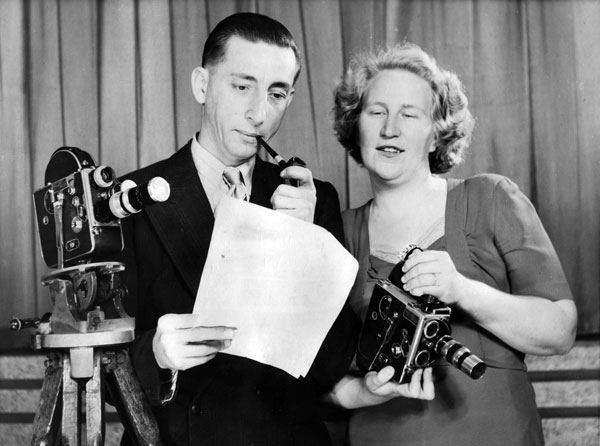
Brisbane filmmakers Paul and Iris Ruckert with their Paillard Bolex 16mm cameras in 1948.

He was also interested in landscape and nature, and was keen to make some films on this topic. An early adventure in the late forties was a trip into the then remote area of Carnarvon Gorge in Queensland to produce a film about that region for the Queensland Royal Geographical Society. This was followed in 1949 by a similar film highlighting North Queensland and the Great Barrier Reef entitled 'Great Barrier Reef Cruise". The next major journey was through Western Queensland and on to Alice Springs and the heart of Australia in 1950. This resulted in films titled "Life in Central Australia" and "Land of Magic" which have early colour footage of the centre's spectacular scenery and even footage of prominent Aboriginal artist Albert Namatjira at work.

Many nature films followed but he had limited funds, so much of his early equipment was improvised and homemade. Despite this some remarkable short films were made such as "Birth of a Butterfly" in 1949 which featured the life cycle of that insect filmed in close up with homemade macro photography equipment which he had described in an article for American Cinematographer magazine.

Other efforts in the mid fifties included "Time Lapse" which was a pioneering documentary featuring the techniques of time lapse photography. He designed and made the automated equipment required to achieve this, and had an article published in American Cinematographer in 1956 detailing his techniques and achievements.

Paul Ruckert filming in the Warrumbungles National Park, NSW, 1976

The success of his early nature films inspired him to do more in that regard and he produced a series of documentaries specifically designed for screenings in Queensland schools. These were one hour educational films on a variety of subjects and were shown in Queensland Schools under the auspices of the Queensland Arts Council. His final productions for this purpose were in the early eighties.

In 1999 he was contacted by producers at the Nine Network who were looking for footage for their forthcoming series "Our Century". Various historical and family footage was used in the series, and afterwards a one-hour special with Ray Martin was produced featuring Paul and his family as some recognition of his lifelong achievements. In ensuing years this led to other articles being written on his career and connections with the Brisbane Cinema industry. In 2007, a year after his death, a final tribute was made when researchers from Griffith University and the Museum of Brisbane held a historic film night. This featured work by Paul Ruckert and fellow Queensland cinematic pioneer Frederick Wills. Paul's wife Iris died 26 April 2012, aged 88 years.

About two-thirds of Paul Ruckert's productions survive in the family collection, only 11 of the documentaries are preserved in the National Film and Sound Archive in Canberra. In the early 2020's the film library was donated to the State Library of Queensland. It has been digitised and included in their collections for public access.

== Filmography ==
=== Newsreels ===
- Invincible Newsreel (10 made in the mid 30s/early 40s)
- Colour Review (early 40s)

=== Comedies ===
- Handy Man (1948)
- Little Menace (1948)

=== Documentaries ===
- Beauty Spots Around Brisbane (1939)
- Carnarvon (1949)
- A Moth is Born (1948)
- Birth of a Butterfly (1949)
- Barrier Reef Cruise (1950)
- Life in Central Australia (1951)
- Land of Magic (1951)
- Through the Centre (1952)
- This is Australia (1952)
- Time Lapse (1956)
- Rolling Clouds (1956)
- Strange World (1960s)
- Call of the Bushland (1960s)
- Insect World (1960s)
- Australian Wildlife (1960s)
- Colour in Our Lives (1970s)
- Wonderful Winged World (1970s)
- Edge of the Sea (1970s)
- Bushland Solitude (1970s)
- Little Creatures (late 1970s)
- Contrasts (late 1970s)
- All About Water (1980)
- Living Things (1981)

=== TV commercials ===
Around 80 to 100 television commercials were made in the late 1950s and into the early 1960s, of which only 21 survive.

=== Home movies ===
- 9 titles covering the family history in 16mm colour (approximately 6,100 ft)
- 13 titles – Comedies in 16mm colour and Black & White (approximately 4,700 ft)
