= Intimate Relations =

Intimate Relations can refer to:

- Intimate Relations (1937 film), a 1937 British film
- Intimate Relations (1953 film), a 1953 British film
- Intimate Relations (1996 film), a 1996 British film
- An intimate relationship
