= Big Time or Bust =

1933 film

- Theatrical poster for the film
- Directed by: Sam Newfield
- Written by: George Wallace Sayre
- Produced by: Sigmund Neufeld
- Starring: Regis Toomey; Gloria Shea; Walter Byron
- Cinematography: Harry Forbes
- Edited by: Al Clark
- Production company: Tower Productions
- Release date: November 10, 1933 (US)
- Running time: 62 minutes
- Country: United States
- Language: English

Big Time or Bust is a 1933 American comedy-drama film directed by Sam Newfield, which stars Regis Toomey, Gloria Shea, and Walter Byron.

== Plot ==
Jimmy Kane is a high diver in a carnival, with his wife, Betty Roberts as his assistant. Before every dive she yells up to him, "Okay, big boy!" When the carnival closes he decides to travel to New York City and attempt to make it in the big time. However, when they arrive in the city, Kane struggles to get into a show which takes advantage of his diving skills. To make ends meet, Betty takes a position as a singer in a nightclub. She attracts the attention of a handsome playboy, John Hammond. Hammond convinces a theatrical producer to cast her in his next Broadway musical, in which she becomes a huge success.

As Betty's career takes off, Kane becomes more and more hurt and resentful that they are living off of her earnings. As the two drift apart, Betty and Hammond drift closer together. In addition to Hammond, Betty is also the center of attention of many other men. As Kane begins to hear rumors of Betty and Hammond having an affair, his morale drops even further. Hammond, an avowed playboy, falls in love with Betty, and gives her an engraved bracelet to show the depth of his affection. When Kane finds the bracelet, he suspects the worst, and leaves, heading back to the country to find a job in a rural carnival.

When Betty learns where he has gone, she is distraught, and is determined to find him. Kane gains employment in a carnival, but as he is about to make his dive, he realizes he has lost his nerve. He is about to climb down in disgrace when he hears a voice from below yelling up to him, "Okay, big boy!" Looking down, he sees Betty looking up at him. He completes his dive successfully, and when he reunites with Betty, she vows to give up her career so the two of them can be together.

== Cast ==
- Regis Toomey as Jimmy Kane
- Gloria Shea as Betty Roberts
- Walter Byron as John Hammond
- Nat Carr as Lew Feld
- Charles Delaney as Paddy Mellon
- Edwin Maxwell as Winthrop Allen
- Hooper Atchley as Lewis

== Reception ==
The Film Daily rated the picture "good", complimenting both the direction and photography. They felt the story was familiar, but well-developed. Harrison's Reports gave the film a poor review, calling the story "trite" and predictable, and rating both the sound and photography sub-standard. However, they did compliment the acting work of Toomey and Shea. Motion Picture Daily gave the film a similar review, calling the storyline unoriginal, but giving the cast good marks for their efforts. They also complimented the settings.
