= Women Won't Tell =

1932 film

- Directed by: Richard Thorpe
- Written by: Lela E. Rogers
- Produced by: George R. Batcheller
- Starring: Sarah Padden; Otis Harlan; Gloria Shea
- Cinematography: M.A. Anderson
- Edited by: Vera Wade
- Production company: Chesterfield Pictures
- Distributed by: Chesterfield Pictures
- Release date: November 15, 1932
- Running time: 67 minutes
- Country: United States
- Language: English

Women Won't Tell is a 1932 American pre-Code drama film directed by Richard Thorpe and starring Sarah Padden, Otis Harlan and Gloria Shea. It was written by Lela E. Rogers, mother of Ginger Rogers.

== Cast ==
- Sarah Padden as Aggie Specks
- Otis Harlan as Henry Jones
- Gloria Shea as April Specks Moorehouse
- Larry Kent as George Robinson
- Edmund Breese as Attorney for the Defense
- Mae Busch as Mrs. Ruth Howard
- Walter Long as Joe Kummer
- William V. Mong as Elias Moorehouse
- Robert Ellis as District Attorney
- Tom Ricketts as Williams
- Isabel Withers as Wanda Wolf
- John Hyams as Walter Robinson
- Jane Darwell as Mrs. Walter Robinson
- Dewey Robinson as Gregory Howard
- Donald Kirke as Alvin Thompson
- Charles Hill Mailes as Second Judge
- Betty Mack as Liz

== Bibliography ==
- Pitts, Michael R. Poverty Row Studios, 1929-1940. McFarland & Company, 2005.
