= Song of the Trail =

1936 film directed by Russell Hopton

- Directed by: Russell Hopton
- Written by: James Oliver Curwood (story); George Wallace Sayre; Barry Barringer
- Produced by: Martin G. Cohn; Maurice Conn
- Starring: Kermit Maynard; Evelyn Brent; Andrea Leeds
- Cinematography: Arthur Reed
- Edited by: Richard G. Wray
- Music by: Abe Meyer
- Production company: Conn Pictures
- Distributed by: Ambassador Pictures
- Release date: March 15, 1936
- Running time: 59 minutes
- Country: United States
- Language: English

Song of the Trail is a 1936 American Western film directed by Russell Hopton and starring Kermit Maynard, Evelyn Brent and Andrea Leeds.

== Cast ==
- Kermit Maynard as Jim Carter
- Evelyn Brent as Myra
- Fuzzy Knight as Pudge
- Andrea Leeds as Betty Hobson
- George 'Gabby' Hayes as Dan Hobson
- Lynette London as Marie
- Wheeler Oakman as Bob Arnold
- Lee Shumway as Stone
- Roger Williams as Miller
- Charles McMurphy as Curtis
- Ray Gallagher as Al Blore
- Horace Murphy as Sheriff

== Bibliography ==
- Michael R. Pitts. Poverty Row Studios, 1929–1940: An Illustrated History of 55 Independent Film Companies, with a Filmography for Each. McFarland & Company, 2005.
