= Sealed Lips =

1941 film by George Waggner

- Directed by: George Waggner
- Screenplay by: George Waggner
- Story by: George Waggner ("Beyond the Law")
- Produced by: Jack Bernhard
- Starring: William Gargan; June Clyde; John Litel
- Cinematography: Stanley Cortez
- Edited by: Arthur Hilton
- Production company: Universal Pictures
- Distributed by: Universal Pictures
- Release date: January 2, 1942
- Running time: 62 minutes
- Country: United States
- Language: English

Sealed Lips is a 1942 American film noir crime film directed and written by George Waggner and starring William Gargan, June Clyde and John Litel.

== Main cast ==
- William Gargan as Lee Davis
- June Clyde as Lois Grant
- John Litel as Fred M. Morton / Mike Rofano
- Anne Nagel as Mary Morton - Fred's Wife
- Mary Gordon as Mrs. Ann Morton, Fred's mother
- Ralf Harolde as Lips Haggarty
- Joseph Crehan as Chief Charles R. Dugan
- Addison Richards as Chief Gary Benson
- Russell Hicks as Dr. Charles Evans
- Edwin Stanley as Warden
- Charles Lane as Attorney Emanuel 'Manny' T. Dixon
- William Gould as Dist. Atty. Slater
- Walter Sande as Investigator Gene Blake

== Bibliography ==
- Gates, Phillipa. Detecting Women: Gender and the Hollywood Detective Film. SUNY Press, 2011.
