= Gloria Shea =

American actress (1910–1995)

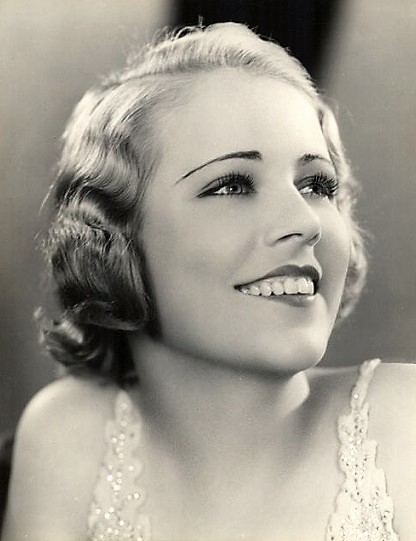
- Shea in 1930
- Born: Olive Gloria Shea; May 30, 1910; New York City, U.S.
- Died: February 8, 1995 (aged 84); Jacksonville, Florida, U.S.
- Other name: Olive Shea
- Occupation: Actress
- Years active: 1929–1936
- Spouse: Robert J. Stroh (m. 1938, divorced)

Olive Gloria Shea (May 30, 1910 – February 8, 1995) was an American film actress. She was sometimes billed as Olive Shea.

== Biography ==
Olive Gloria Shea was born in New York City on May 30, 1913. She received her schooling at the Convent of Notre Dame de Sande and was trained for the stage by Florenz Ziegfeld Jr. She is the sister of William Shea. While she was in high school she worked briefly in a department store, after which she became a model for the John Powers agency.

Shea worked on CBS Radio and as a model in New York. In 1929 she was named Miss Radio. Her modeling for cigarette posters included her being featured as the first Chesterfield girl and the Camel girl.

Early in Shea's career she was in six Vitaphone short films.

Shea had the female lead role in the Universal serial, The Phantom of the Air (1933). On stage (billed as Olive Shea), she had the role of Baby in the Broadway production of Blind Mice (1930)

She married Robert J. Stroh in 1938. The marriage and an autombile accident ended her career, as she retired to spend time with Stroh. She had a son and a daughter.

On February 8, 1995, Shea died in Jacksonville, Florida.

== Selected filmography ==
- Glorifying the American Girl (1929)
- Women Won't Tell (1932)
- The Night Mayor (1932)
- Big City Blues (1932) as Agnes (uncredited)
- Big Time or Bust (1933)
- The Dude Bandit (1933)
- Strange People (1933)
- Dance Girl Dance (1933)
- A Successful Failure (1934)
- A Demon for Trouble (1934)
- Tomorrow's Youth (1934)
- The Oil Raider (1934)
- I Like It That Way (1934)
- Money Means Nothing (1934)
- Laddie (1935)
- Dangerous Intrigue (1936)
- Black Gold (1936)

== Bibliography ==
- Michael R. Pitts. Poverty Row Studios, 1929-1940: An Illustrated History of 55 Independent Film Companies, with a Filmography for Each. McFarland & Company, 2005.
