= Below the Deadline (1936 film) =

1936 film by Charles Lamont

- Directed by: Charles Lamont
- Written by: Ewart Adamson (story)
- Produced by: George R. Batcheller
- Starring: Cecilia Parker; Russell Hopton; Theodore von Eltz
- Cinematography: M.A. Anderson
- Edited by: Roland D. Reed
- Production company: Chesterfield Pictures
- Distributed by: Chesterfield Pictures
- Release date: June 6, 1936
- Running time: 64 minutes
- Country: United States
- Language: English

Below the Deadline is a 1936 American crime drama film directed by Charles Lamont and starring Cecilia Parker, Russell Hopton and Theodore von Eltz. It was produced and distributed by Chesterfield Pictures, which focused on low-budget productions and was soon after merged into Republic Pictures.

== Cast ==
- Cecilia Parker as Molly Fitzgerald
- Russell Hopton as Terry Mulvaney
- Theodore von Eltz as Flash Ackroyd
- Thomas E. Jackson as Pearson
- Warner Richmond as Diamond Dutch
- John St. Polis as Mr. Abrams
- Kathryn Sheldon as Aunt Mary Tibbett
- Robert Homans as Police Captain Symonds
- Jack Gardner as Henchman Spike
- Al Thompson as Sparring Partner Al
- Charles Delaney as Artie Nolan
- Sidney Payne as Plastic Surgeon
- Edward Hearn as Guard Peters

== Home media ==
On October 27, 2009, Alpha Video released Below the Deadline on Region 0 DVD.
