= Boys' Reformatory =

1939 film

- DVD cover
- Directed by: Howard Bretherton
- Written by: Screenplay: Ray Trampe; Wellyn Totman; Story: Ray Trampe; Norman S. Hall
- Produced by: Lindsley Parsons
- Starring: Frankie Darro; Grant Withers; Lillian Elliott; Ben Welden; Frank Coghlan, Jr. David Durand
- Cinematography: Harry Neumann
- Edited by: Russell Schoengarth
- Music by: Edward Kay
- Distributed by: Monogram Pictures Corporation
- Release date: May 1, 1939
- Running time: 62 minutes
- Country: United States
- Language: English

Boys' Reformatory is a 1939 American crime film directed by Howard Bretherton and produced by Lindsley Parsons for Monogram Pictures. The screenplay was written by Wellyn Totman and Ray Trampe based on a story by Ray Trampe and Norman S. Hall.

== Cast ==
- Frankie Darro as Tommy Ryan
- Lillian Elliott as Mrs. O'Meara
- Frank Coghlan, Jr. as Eddie O'Meara
- Ben Welden as Mike Hearn
- David Durand as 'Knuckles' Malone
- William P. Carleton as Superior Judge Robert A. Scott
- Grant Withers as Dr. Owens, a physician at the State Industrial School
- John St. Polis as Superintendent Keene of the State Industrial School
- Pat Flaherty as Barnes, a guard at the State Industrial School
- George Offerman, Jr. as Joey, an inmate at the State Industrial School

== Works cited ==
- Schary, Timothy (2005), Teen Movies: American Youth on Screen, London: Wallflower Press, ISBN 1-904764-49-5
