= Russell Hopton =

American actor (1900–1945)

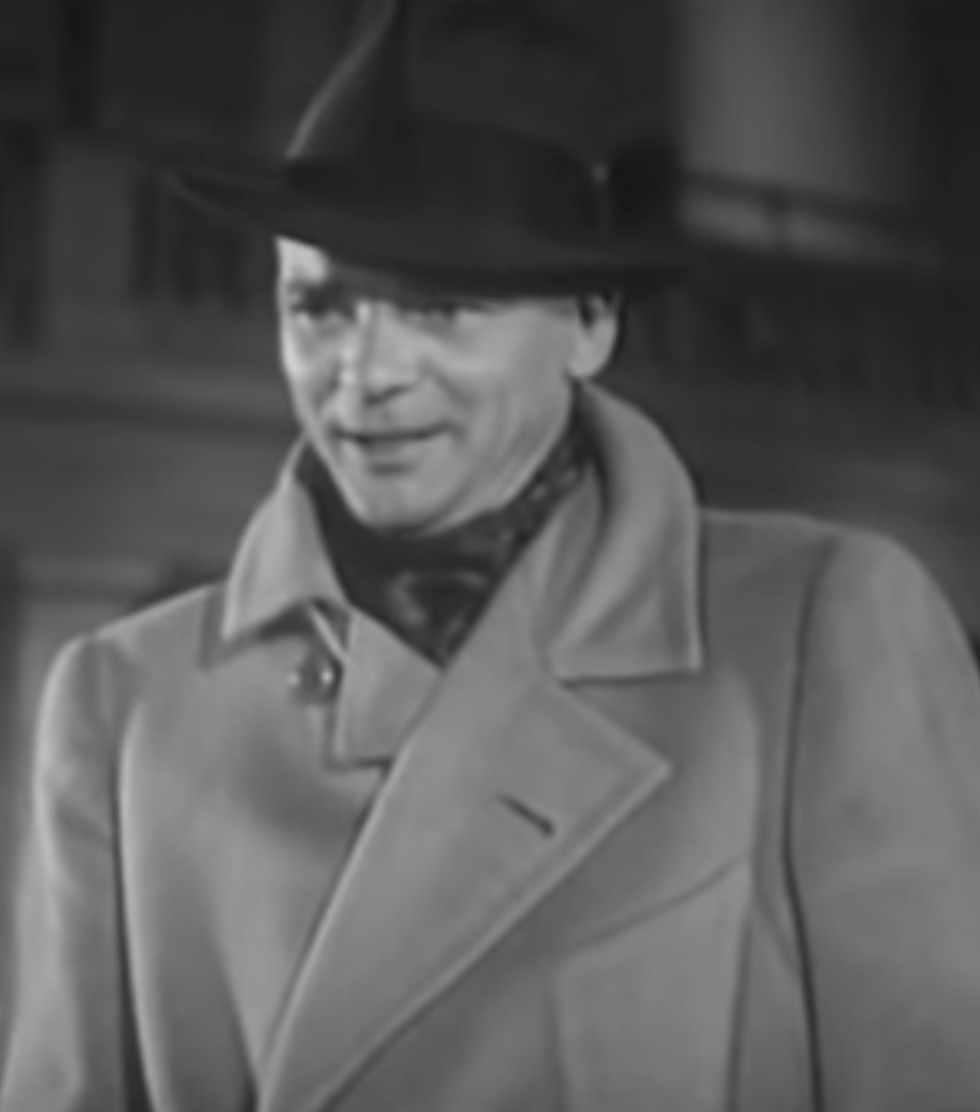
- Hopton in One Year Later (1933)
- Born: Harry Russell Hopton; February 18, 1900; New York City, New York, U.S.
- Died: April 7, 1945 (aged 45); North Hollywood, California, U.S.
- Resting place: Holy Cross Cemetery, Culver City, California
- Occupation: Actor
- Years active: 1926–1945

Harry Russell Hopton (February 18, 1900 – April 7, 1945) was an American film actor and director.

== Biography ==
Hopton was born in New York City, New York. He appeared in 110 films between 1926 and 1945, often playing streetwise characters from the city. Hopton directed the films Song of the Trail (1936) and Black Gold (1936). He died of an overdose of sleeping pills in North Hollywood, California. He is buried at Holy Cross Cemetery in Culver City.

== Selected filmography ==
- Ella Cinders (1926) - Studio Actor (uncredited)
- Call of the Flesh (1930) - Captain Enrique Vargas
- College Lovers (1930) - Eddie Smith
- Remote Control (1930) - Frank
- Min and Bill (1930) - Alec Johnson
- New Moon (1930) - Dimitri (uncredited)
- The Criminal Code (1930) - State's Attorney (uncredited)
- Desert Vengeance (1931) - Inspector (uncredited)
- Dance, Fools, Dance (1931) - Whitey
- The Miracle Woman (1931) - Bill Welford
- The Star Witness (1931) - Deputy Thorpe
- Street Scene (1931) - Steve Sankey
- Reckless Living (1931) - Kid Regan
- Blonde Crazy (1931) - Jerry (uncredited)
- Arrowsmith (1931) - Terry Wickett
- Discarded Lovers (1932) - Bob Adair
- The Drifter (1932) - Montana
- Dance Team (1932) - Roseland Master of Ceremonies (uncredited)
- The Man Who Played God (1932) - Reporter (uncredited)
- Law and Order (1932) - Luther Johnson
- The Big Timer (1932) - Sullivan
- Steady Company (1932) - Joe (uncredited)
- Scandal for Sale (1932) - Sympathetic Juror (uncredited)
- Night World (1932) - Klauss
- The Famous Ferguson Case (1932) - Rusty Callahan
- Radio Patrol (1932) - Pat Bourke
- Fast Companions (1932) - Crooked Owner
- Tom Brown of Culver (1932) - American Legion Doctor
- Back Street (1932) - Reporter (uncredited)
- Once in a Lifetime (1932) - Jerome 'Jerry' Hyland
- Air Mail (1932) - 'Dizzy' Wilkins
- Destination Unknown (1933) - Georgie
- The Little Giant (1933) - Al Daniels
- Elmer, the Great (1933) - Whitey
- Secret of the Blue Room (1933) - Max, the chauffeur
- One Year Later (1933) - Tony Richards
- Curtain at Eight (1933) - Terry Mooney - Reporter
- I'm No Angel (1933) - The Barker
- Back Page (1933) - Brice Regal
- Lady Killer (1933) - Smiley
- Good Dame (1934) - 'Spats' Edwards
- School for Girls (1934) - Elliott Robbins, aka Buck Kreegar
- Men in White (1934) - Dr. Pete Bradley
- He Was Her Man (1934) - Monk
- Born to Be Bad (1934) - Steve Karns
- Half a Sinner (1934) - 'Slim' Sullivan
- The Girl from Missouri (1934) - Bert (scenes deleted)
- Take the Stand (1934) - Bill Hamilton
- Desirable (1934) - Chet
- A Successful Failure (1934) - Phil Stardon
- I Sell Anything (1934) - 'Smiley'
- The World Accuses (1934) - Hugh Collins
- Northern Frontier (1935) - Duke Milford
- Wings in the Dark (1935) - Jake Brashear
- Car 99 (1935) - Dispatch Operator Harper
- Times Square Lady (1935) - Ed Brennan
- Star of Midnight (1935) - Tommy Tennant
- G Men (1935) - Gerard
- Circus Shadows (1935) - A Dip
- The Headline Woman (1935) - Craig
- Death from a Distance (1935) - Det. Lt. Ted Mallory
- Cheers of the Crowd (1935) - Lee Adams
- Charlie Chan in Shanghai (1935) - 'G' Man (uncredited)
- Valley of Wanted Men (1935) - Kelly Dillon
- False Pretenses (1935) - Pat Brennan
- Frisco Waterfront (1935) - Eddie
- Rose of the Rancho (1936) - Frisco
- Black Gold (1936) - Joe (uncredited)
- Sutter's Gold (1936) - Crazed Sailor (uncredited)
- Boulder Dam (1936) - Cable Operatior (uncredited)
- Below the Deadline (1936) - Terry Mulvaney
- The Last Outlaw (1936) - Sheriff Arthur Billings
- A Son Comes Home (1936) - Reporter (uncredited)
- With Love and Kisses (1936) - Flash Henderson
- Beware of Ladies (1936) - Randy Randall
- Song of the Trail (1936)
- We Who Are About to Die (1937) - 'Mac' MacAndrews
- Angel's Holiday (1937) - Gus
- High, Wide, and Handsome (1937) - John Thompson (uncredited)
- One Mile from Heaven (1937) - Peter Brindell
- Bad Guy (1937) - Charlie Edwards - Gambler (uncredited)
- Big City (1937) - Buddy - Beecher's Cohort (uncredited)
- Idol of the Crowds (1937) - Kelly
- Letter of Introduction (1938) - Process Server (uncredited)
- Crime Takes a Holiday (1938) - Jerry Clayton
- Tarnished Angel (1938) - Lou (uncredited)
- Made for Each Other (1939) - Collins (uncredited)
- The Saint Strikes Back (1939) - Harry Donnell
- Some Like It Hot (1939) - Barker (uncredited)
- Renegade Trail (1939) - Bob Smoky Joslin
- Mutiny in the Big House (1939) - Convict Frankie
- Torture Ship (1939) - Harry 'The Carver' Bogard
- Women Without Names (1940) - Police Broadcaster (uncredited)
- Son of the Navy (1940) - Police Officer (uncredited)
- On the Spot (1940) - Dave Nolan
- Argentine Nights (1940) - Irate Passenger (uncredited)
- The Quarterback (1940) - Man in Car with Bill (uncredited)
- A Night of Adventure (1944) - Benny Sarto
- Youth Runs Wild (1944) - Dickens (uncredited)
- The Master Race (1944) - Porto (uncredited)
- Tall in the Saddle (1944) - Wagon Driver (uncredited)
- Heavenly Days (1944) - Remorse - News Photographer (uncredited)
- Nevada (1944) - Henchman (uncredited)
- What a Blonde (1945) - Bothered Train Passenger (uncredited)
- Betrayal from the East (1945) - (uncredited)
- Zombies on Broadway (1945) - Benny
- West of the Pecos (1945) - Jeff Slinger
- Johnny Angel (1945) - Reporter (uncredited)
