= Sarah Padden =

English-American actress (1881–1967)

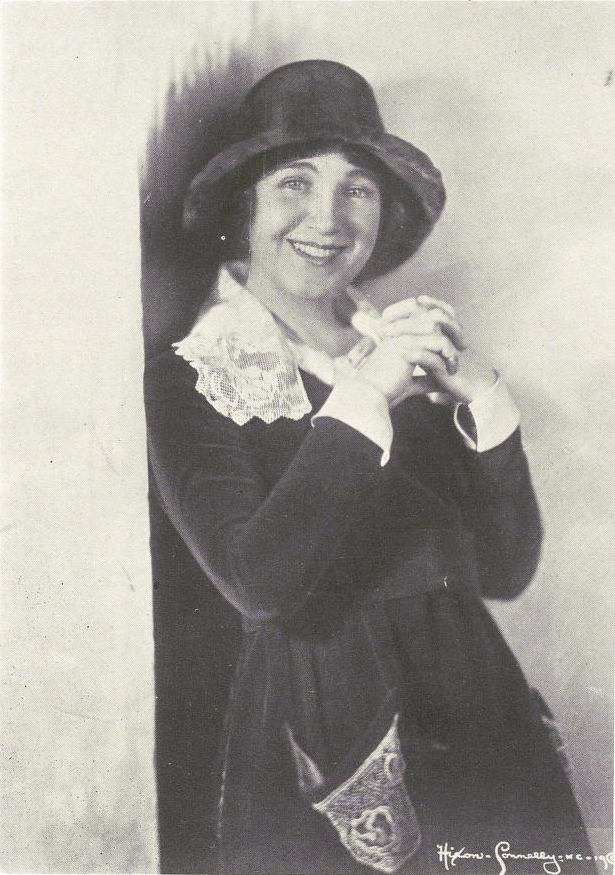
- Padden in 1918
- Born: Sarah Ann Padden; 16 October 1881; Sunderland, England, UK
- Died: 4 December 1967 (aged 86); Los Angeles, California, U.S.
- Resting place: Holy Cross Cemetery, Culver City, California
- Occupation: Actress
- Years active: 1926–1958
- Spouse: George Clarence Sackett (m. 1916)

Sarah Ann Padden (16 October 1881 – 4 December 1967) was an English-born American theatre and film character actress. She performed on stage in the early 20th century. Her best-known single-act performance was in The Clod, a stage production in which she played an uneducated woman who lived on a farm during the American Civil War.

== Early life ==
Sarah Ann Padden was born in England to English mother Sarah Carruthe and Irish immigrant father Michael Padden. The family emigrated to the United States on the S/S Ohio from England passing through the Port of Philadelphia in 1889.

The future actress took part in recitations in the Catholic school she attended in Chicago, where her fellow students enjoyed her talent as a mimic. Her parents wanted her to enter a convent, but a liberal-minded priest, Father Dorney, encouraged her ambition to become an actress. He assisted her in obtaining her first stage role, a theatrical featuring Otis Skinner.

For many years, Padden lived in the vicinity of the Broad River, Gaston, South Carolina. On one occasion she ventured onto a dam, reaching its center just as the noon whistle blew near the power station. Frightened, she lost her balance and fell over, but she managed to cling to a steel eye bolt. She was rescued by an African American manservant of the power company superintendent. Afterwards, her parents hired the man and took him to New York City, where he died at age 108.

== Theatrical career ==
Padden was a featured player on the Orpheum Circuit. She had a role in His Grace de Grammont, a romantic comedy by Clyde Fitch which came to the Park Theatre in Boston in September 1905. The production starred Skinner and was based on the life of a chevalier in the court of Charles II. Padden appeared again with Skinner in a four-act play produced by Charles Frohman, The Honor of the Family, by Émile Fabre, which was presented in New Rochelle, New York in September 1907.

Another of her theatrical parts was in Hell-Bent Fer Heaven, a Pulitzer Prize-winning play by Hatcher Hughes. It was performed at the Wilkes Orange Grove Theater (Majestic Theater), 845 South Broadway (Los Angeles), in November 1925.

== Film ==
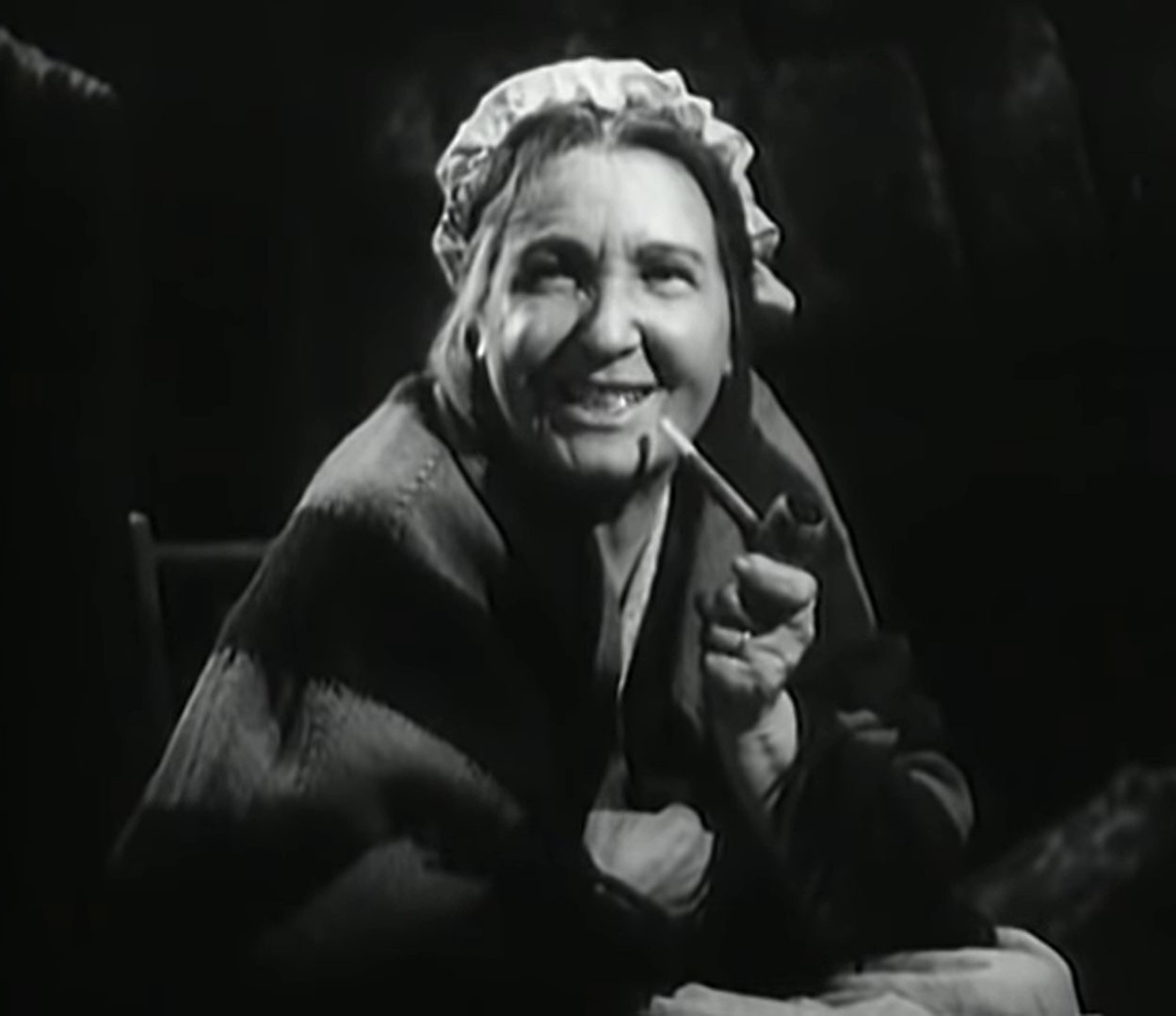
Padden in The Mad Monster (1942)

Padden was also an active screen actress from 1926 to 1958, appearing in 178 films and TV shows. In 1938, she played "Ma" Thayer in MGM's Rich Man, Poor Girl, directed by Reinhold Schünzel and starring Robert Young, Ruth Hussey, and Lana Turner. Bill Harrison (Robert Young) a wealthy young businessman moves in with secretary girlfriend Joan Thayer's (Ruth Hussey) eccentric family to convince her they can make their marriage work.

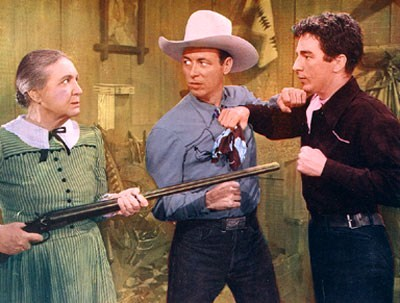
Sarah Padden, Eddie Dean, and Lash LaRue in Song of Old Wyoming (1945).

In 1941, she played wealthy spinster Aunt Cassandra ("Cassie") Hildegarde Denham in Murder by Invitation, directed by Phil Rosen and starring Wallace Ford and Marian Marsh. In this "closed room" murder comedy, after they unsuccessfully attempt to have her declared legally insane to gain control of her fortune, her nephews and nieces are invited to a week's visit at her mansion where they are murdered one by one.

== Avid golfer ==
She was athletic, taking part in skating, tennis, and swimming. She played 18 to 36 holes of golf daily. In 1919. she was considered one of the best female golfers in the United States. In Los Angeles, she was fond of playing the municipal links at Griffith Park.

== Death ==
She died on 4 December 1967 in Los Angeles, California, at age 86. She was buried in Holy Cross Cemetery in Culver City.

== Selected filmography ==
- Obey the Law (1926) - The Mother
- Heroes of the Night (1927) - Mrs. Riley
- Colleen (1927) - Police Lieutenant's Wife
- The Woman Who Did Not Care (1927) - Mrs. Carroll
- The Bugle Call (1927) - Luke's Wife
- Sarah Padden in The Eternal Barrier (1927) (*Vitaphone short)
- Sarah Padden in Souvenirs (1928) (*Vitaphone short)
- Companionate Marriage (1928) - Mrs. Williams
- Wonder of Women (1929) - Anna
- The Sophomore (1929) - Mrs. Collins
- Trifles (1930, Short) - Mrs. Wright
- Hide-Out (1930) - Mrs. Dorgan
- Our Blushing Brides (1930) - Mrs. Hinkle - the Landlady (uncredited)
- Billy the Kid (1930) - Homesteader Mrs. Foster (uncredited)
- Today (1930) - Emma Warner
- The Great Meadow (1931) - Mistress Molly Hall
- Bad Girl (1931) - Mrs. Gardner (uncredited)
- Sob Sister (1931) - Ma Stevens
- The Yellow Ticket (1931) - Mother Kalish (uncredited)
- Mata Hari (1931) - Nursing Sister Teresa (uncredited)
- Cross-Examination (1932) - Mary Stevens
- Grand Hotel (1932) - Chambermaid in Room 174 (uncredited)
- Young America (1932) - Mrs. Mary Taylor
- The Midnight Lady (1932) - Nita St. George
- Red-Headed Woman (1932) - Mary - Legendre Maid (uncredited)
- Rebecca of Sunnybrook Farm (1932) - Mrs. Cobb
- The Washington Masquerade (1932) - Pardoned Boy's Mother (uncredited)
- Blondie of the Follies (1932) - Ma McClune
- Two Against the World (1932) - Mrs. Polansky (uncredited)
- Kongo (1932) - Nun in Convent School (uncredited)
- Wild Girl (1932) - Lize
- Women Won't Tell (1932) - Aggie Specks
- Tess of the Storm Country (1932) - Old Martha
- Rasputin and the Empress (1932) - Duna - Landlady (uncredited)
- Face in the Sky (1933) - Ma Brown
- Pilgrimage (1933) - Mother of Soldier Missing in Action (uncredited)
- The Important Witness (1933) - Deaf Woman
- The Power and the Glory (1933) - Henry's Wife
- Doctor Bull (1933) - Mary the Canning Cook (uncredited)
- Ann Vickers (1933) - Lil-Black Woman
- The Wolf Dog (1933) - Mrs. Stevens
- The Sin of Nora Moran (1933) - Mrs. Watts
- Man of Two Worlds (1934) - Olago
- As the Earth Turns (1934) - Mrs. Janowski
- David Harum (1934) - Widow Cullon
- Men in White (1934) - Rose Smith (uncredited)
- All Men Are Enemies (1934) - Proprietress (uncredited)
- He Was Her Man (1934) - Mrs. Gardella
- Marrying Widows (1934)
- Little Man, What Now? (1934) - Widow Scharrenhofer
- The Defense Rests (1934) - Mrs. Evans
- Tomorrow's Children (1934) - Mrs. Mason
- When Strangers Meet (1934) - Mrs. Tarman
- A Dog of Flanders (1935) - Frau Keller
- The Hoosier Schoolmaster (1935) - Sarah
- Stranded (1935) - Workman's Wife (uncredited)
- Mad Love (1935) - Mother of Lame Girl (uncredited)
- Anna Karenina (1935) - Governess
- Youth on Parole (1937) - Mrs. Blair
- Exiled to Shanghai (1937) - Aunt Jane
- Women in Prison (1938) - Martha Wilson
- Three Comrades (1938) - Frau Schultz (uncredited)
- Romance of the Limberlost (1938) - Sarah
- Woman Against Woman (1938) - Dora
- Rich Man, Poor Girl (1938) - Ma
- Little Tough Guys in Society (1938) - Victim (uncredited)
- Little Orphan Annie (1938) - Mrs. Nora Moriarty
- Off the Record (1939) - Mrs. Fallon (uncredited)
- The Adventures of Huckleberry Finn (1939) - Woman Wanting Needle Threaded (uncredited)
- Let Freedom Ring (1939) - 'Ma' Logan
- Man of Conquest (1939) - Houston's Mother (uncredited)
- The Zero Hour (1939) - Sister Theodosia
- Should a Girl Marry (1939) - Mrs. Wilson
- I Stole a Million (1939) - Lady in Post Office (uncredited)
- The Angels Wash Their Faces (1939) - Mrs. Smith (scenes deleted)
- Forgotten Girls (1940) - Miss Donaldson
- Son of the Navy (1940) - Mrs. Baker - Landlady
- Street of Memories (1940) - Mother (uncredited)
- Lone Star Raiders (1940) - Lydia 'Granny' Phelps
- Chad Hanna (1940) - Mrs. Tridd
- In Old Colorado (1941) - Ma Woods
- The Man Who Lost Himself (1941) - Maid
- City of Missing Girls (1941) - Mrs. Randolph
- A Woman's Face (1941) - Police Matron
- Tight Shoes (1941) - Mrs. Rupert
- Murder by Invitation (1941) - Cassandra 'Cassie' Denham
- Reg'lar Fellers (1941) - Hetty Carter
- Outlaws of Cherokee Trail (1941) - The Nun (uncredited)
- It Started with Eve (1941) - Jenny - Coat Check (uncredited)
- The Corsican Brothers (1941) - Nurse
- Private Snuffy Smith (1942) - Lowizie Smith
- Wild Bill Hickok Rides (1942) - Mrs. Kimball (uncredited)
- The Power of God (1942) - Esther Worne
- Heart of the Rio Grande (1942) - Skipper Forbes
- The Mad Monster (1942) - Grandmother
- This Gun for Hire (1942) - Mrs. Mason (uncredited)
- Lady in a Jam (1942) - Miner's Wife (uncredited)
- The Pride of the Yankees (1942) - Mrs. Roberts (uncredited)
- Law and Order (1942) - Aunt Mary Todd
- Riders of the West (1942) - Ma Turner
- Dr. Gillespie's New Assistant (1942) - Neighbor (uncredited)
- Assignment in Brittany (1943) - Albertine
- Hangmen Also Die! (1943) - Mrs. Georgia Dvorak
- Hostages (1943) - Old Woman (uncredited)
- So This Is Washington (1943) - Aunt Charity Speers
- The North Star (1943) - Old Lady (uncredited)
- Jack London (1943) - Cannery Woman
- The Navy Way (1944) - Mrs. Margaret Gimble (uncredited)
- This Is the Life (1944) - Sarah (uncredited)
- Range Law (1944) - Boots Annie
- Summer Storm (1944) - Beggar Woman (uncredited)
- Trail to Gunsight (1944) - Grandma Wagner
- Casanova Brown (1944) - Mrs. Smith (uncredited)
- San Diego, I Love You (1944) - Mrs. Gulliver (uncredited)
- Girl Rush (1944) - Mrs. Emma Mason
- Ghost Guns (1944) - Aunt Sally
- Three Is a Family (1944) - Middle-Aged Woman (uncredited)
- Identity Unknown (1945) - Mrs. Anderson
- It's in the Bag! (1945) - Woman in Elevator (uncredited)
- The Master Key (1945, Serial) - Aggie
- Honeymoon Ahead (1945) - Mrs. Halett
- The Unseen (1945) - Alberta (uncredited)
- Wildfire (1945) - Aunt Agatha
- Riders of the Dawn (1945) - Melinda Pringle
- Apology for Murder (1945) - Maggie - the Janitress
- Marshal of Laredo (1945) - Mrs. Randall
- Song of Old Wyoming (1945) - Ma Conway
- Dakota (1945) - Mrs. Plummer
- Idea Girl (1946) - Old lady #1
- Breakfast in Hollywood (1946) - Mrs. Marie Edgedaw (uncredited)
- So Goes My Love (1946) - Bridget
- Joe Palooka, Champ (1946) - Mom Palooka
- Earl Carroll Sketchbook (1946) - Mrs. Murphy (uncredited)
- Angel on My Shoulder (1946) - Agatha (uncredited)
- Gentleman Joe Palooka (1946) - Mom Palooka
- Wild West (1946) - Carrie Bannister
- My Dog Shep (1946) - Aunt Carrie Hodgkins
- That Brennan Girl (1946) - Mrs. Graves, the Nice Landlady
- Trail Street (1947) - Mrs. Ferguson (uncredited)
- Ramrod (1947) - Mrs. Parks
- Love and Learn (1947) - Mrs. Grant (uncredited)
- The Millerson Case (1947) - Emma Millerson (uncredited)
- Possessed (1947) - Mrs. Norris - Caretaker's Wife (uncredited)
- Joe Palooka in the Knockout (1947) - Mom Palooka
- Joe Palooka in Fighting Mad (1948) - Mom Palooka
- The Return of the Whistler (1948) - Mrs. Hulskamp
- The Dude Goes West (1948) - Mrs. Hallahan
- Frontier Revenge (1948) - Widow Owens
- Homicide (1949) - Mrs. Webb
- Range Justice (1949) - Ma Curtis
- The Doctor and the Girl (1949) - Miss Newton (uncredited)
- House by the River (1950) - Mrs. Beach
- Gunslingers (1950) - Rawhide Rosie Rawlins
- A Life of Her Own (1950) - Overseer (uncredited)
- Again Pioneers (1950) - Ma Ashby
- The Missourians (1950) - Mother Kovacs
- Oh! Susanna (1951) - Mrs. Ledbetter (uncredited)
- Utah Wagon Train (1951) - Sarah Wendover
- She's Working Her Way Through College (1952) - Wardrobe Woman at Burlesque Theatre (uncredited)
- Big Jim McLain (1952) - Mrs. Lexiter
- Prince of Players (1955) - Mary Todd Lincoln (uncredited)
- The Kettles in the Ozarks (1956) - Miz Tinware (uncredited)
- No Time for Sergeants (1958) - Sgt. King's Mother (uncredited)
- Screaming Mimi (1958) - Thelma (uncredited)
- Girl With an Itch (1958) - Cookie
