= Country Fair (film) =

1941 film by Frank McDonald

- Theatrical release poster
- Directed by: Frank McDonald
- Screenplay by: Dorrell McGowan; Stuart E. McGowan
- Story by: Jack Townley
- Produced by: Armand Schaefer
- Starring: Eddie Foy, Jr. June Clyde; Guinn "Big Boy" Williams; William Demarest; Harold Huber; Ferris Taylor
- Cinematography: Ernest Miller
- Edited by: Ernest J. Nims
- Music by: Mort Glickman
- Production company: Republic Pictures
- Distributed by: Republic Pictures
- Release date: May 5, 1941
- Running time: 74 minutes
- Country: United States
- Language: English

Country Fair is a 1941 American comedy film directed by Frank McDonald and written by Dorrell McGowan and Stuart E. McGowan. The film stars Eddie Foy, Jr., June Clyde, Guinn "Big Boy" Williams, William Demarest, Harold Huber and Ferris Taylor. The film was released on May 5, 1941, by Republic Pictures.

== Cast ==
- Eddie Foy, Jr. as Johnny Campbell
- June Clyde as Pepper Wilson
- Guinn "Big Boy" Williams as Gunther Potts
- William Demarest as Stogie McPhee
- Harold Huber as Cash Nichols
- Ferris Taylor as Cornelius Simpson
- Maurice Cass as Sneezy
- Myrtle Wiseman as Lulu Belle
- Scotty Wiseman as Scotty
- Harold Peary as Gildersleeve
- The Duke of Paducah as Whitey
