= The Lady Refuses =

1931 film

- DVD cover for the film
- Directed by: George Archainbaud
- Screenplay by: Wallace Smith
- Story by: Guy Bolton; Robert Milton
- Produced by: William LeBaron; Bertram Millhauser
- Starring: Betty Compson; John Darrow; Gilbert Emery; Margaret Livingston
- Cinematography: Leo Tover
- Edited by: Jack Kitchin
- Distributed by: RKO Radio Pictures
- Release date: March 8, 1931 (US)
- Running time: 72 minutes
- Country: United States
- Language: English

The Lady Refuses

The Lady Refuses is a 1931 American pre-Code melodrama film, directed by George Archainbaud, from a screenplay by Wallace Smith, based on an original story by Guy Bolton and Robert Milton. It stars Betty Compson as a destitute young woman on the verge of becoming a prostitute, who is hired by a wealthy man to woo his ne'er-do-well son away from the clutches of a gold-digger (Margaret Livingston). The plot is regarded as risqué enough to appear in at least one collection of pre-Code Hollywood films.

== Plot ==
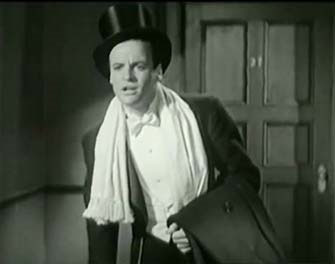
John Darrow as Russell

Sir Gerald Courtney is an aristocrat whose son, Russell, prefers to spend his time partying with young women rather than focusing on the promising career he has in architecture. When Russell leaves one evening to revel with the gold-digging Berthine Waller rather than spending it dining with his father, Sir Gerald is a bit despondent. As he ponders what to do about his wayward son, providence takes a hand.

A beautiful destitute young woman, June, on the verge of entering into the oldest of professions due to her desperation, is being pursued by the London police. Sir Gerald, who was at the window on the first floor watching his son leaving with Berthine Waller, observes how June leaves a taxi on the other side of the street, and is being cornered by the police. As she comes over to his house to knock, he opens the door and welcomes her as a niece he was expecting, reassuring the Policemen that she is a respectable citizen. After they leave, Sir Gerald invites her to dinner, after she tells him of her situation. He then proposes to hire June for 1000 Pounds to prevent his son from falling into the clutches of Berthine.

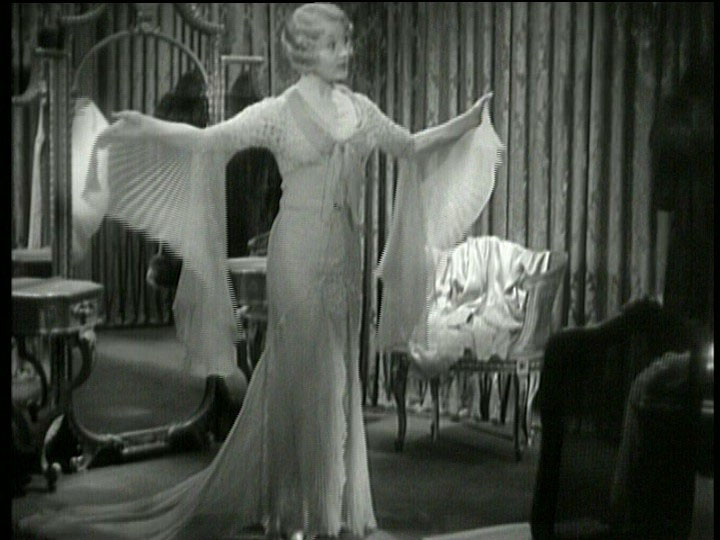
Betty Compson as June

June does her job beautifully, as Russell leaves Berthine and begins to concentrate on his architectural career, much to his father's delight. There's a slight hitch, however: June has fallen in love with Sir Gerald, rather than Russell. Devastated, Russell calls Berthine to meet him at his apartment (which is upstairs in the same building where June lives). Seeing all of her work being unwound in a single evening, June lures Russell down to her apartment where she gets him so drunk that he passes out and spends the night.

Berthine arrives at Russell's apartment where she has been followed by an ex-lover, Nikolai Rabinoff. In a jealous rage, Nikolai kills Berthine. The following morning Russell awakes to find June gone, having vowed to not come between the son and the father. Russell is also the main suspect in Berthine's murder. Seeking shelter from his father, Russell refuses to invoke June as his alibi. In order to save him, June steps forward and admits that Russell spent the night in her apartment. Sir Gerald, thinking the worst, renounces his devotion for June, which devastates her, but confirmed what she always feared: That Sir Gerald would never rely on her. June leaves his house, but when Sir Gerald, shortly thereafter, discovers the innocence of Russell's night spent in her apartment, he realizes his own mistake and vows to track her down and spend the rest of his life with her.

== Cast ==
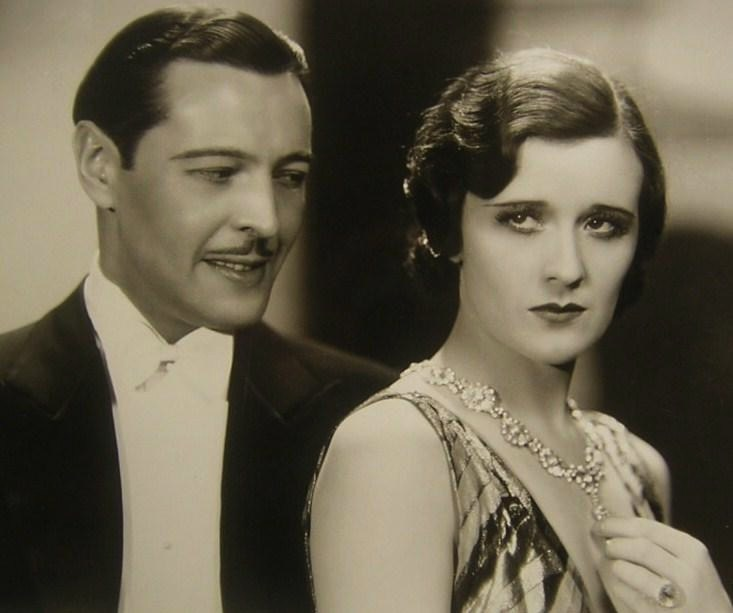
Ivan Lebedeff and Margaret Livingston in The Lady Refuses

- Betty Compson as June
- John Darrow as Russell Courtney
- Gilbert Emery as Sir Gerald Courtney
- Margaret Livingston as Berthine Waller
- Ivan Lebedeff as Nikolai Rabinoff
- Edgar Norton as Sir Gerald's Butler
- Daphne Pollard as Apartment House Maid

(cast list as per AFI database)

== Notes ==
In 1959, the film entered the public domain in the United States because the claimants did not renew its copyright registration in the 28th year after publication.

During production, this film was known by several titles, including Children of the Streets, Ladies for Hire, A Lady for Hire and Forgotten Women. According to several sources at the time, the noted screenwriter, Jane Murfin was supposed to have done work in the adaptation of the Milton/Bolton story for the screen, however, no sources give her credit for any writing work on the film.
