= The Oil Raider =

1934 film

- Directed by: Spencer Gordon Bennet
- Written by: Homer King Gordon; George Morgan; Rex Taylor
- Produced by: Spencer Gordon Bennet; Lester F. Scott Jr.
- Starring: Buster Crabbe; Gloria Shea; George Irving
- Cinematography: Edward Snyder
- Edited by: Frederick Bain
- Production company: Scott-Bennet Productions
- Distributed by: Mayfair Pictures
- Release date: November 1, 1934
- Running time: 59 minutes
- Country: United States
- Language: English

The Oil Raider is a 1934 American action film directed by Spencer Gordon Bennet and starring Buster Crabbe, Gloria Shea and George Irving. It was produced on Poverty Row as a second feature and was distributed by independent company Mayfair Pictures.

== Plot ==
Dave Warren, a wildcatter, has uncovered a potentially profitable oil well but needs more money to keep drilling. He borrows fifty thousand dollars from an investment banker Varley. When Varley's financial interests suffer a severe collapse he needs urgent money and hires men to sabotage the drilling so that he can foreclose and use the oil to recover his fortunes. However, his own daughter Alice has fallen in love with Warren.

== Cast ==
- Buster Crabbe as Dave Warren
- Gloria Shea as Alice Varley
- George Irving as J. T. Varley, Investment Banker
- Max Wagner as Simmons, a Troublemaker
- Emmett Vogan as Jim Walker
- Harold Minjir as Morrison
- Tetsu Komai as Chinese Cook
- Tom London as Oil Well Driller
- Chuck Morrison as Oil Well Driller
- Hal Taliaferro as Oil Well Driller

== Bibliography ==
- Pitts, Michael R. Poverty Row Studios, 1929–1940: An Illustrated History of 55 Independent Film Companies, with a Filmography for Each. McFarland & Company, 2005.
