= A Successful Failure =

1934 film by Arthur Lubin

- Directed by: Arthur Lubin
- Written by: Marion Orth
- Based on: short story, "Your Uncle William" by Michael Kane
- Produced by: George Yohalem
- Cinematography: Jerome Ash
- Edited by: Jack Ogilvie
- Music by: Clifford Vaughan
- Distributed by: Monogram Pictures
- Release date: October 15, 1934
- Running time: 62 minutes
- Country: United States
- Language: English

A Successful Failure is a 1934 American film. It was the directorial debut for Arthur Lubin.

There is no connection between the fictional radio personality "Uncle Dudley" in this film, and the 1935 comedy film Your Uncle Dudley, starring Edward Everett Horton.

== Plot ==
Ellery Cushing (William Collier Sr.) has trouble at home, and at work. When he's fired from the newspaper where he's worked for fifteen years, his friend Phil (Russell Hopton) quits too, outraged.

Together, they work from their "office", on a park bench, until Phil can get Ellery a try-out, on a radio spot, as "Uncle Dudley". His folksy witticisms makes the character a big hit.

Meanwhile, at home, Ma, Mrs. Cushing (Lucile Gleason), has her hands full with their daughter, Ruth (Gloria Shea), who has spurned Phil's attentions for an aging Lothario, Jerry (Jameson Thomas). While their oldest son, Robert (William Janney), after turning down a job, has got mixed up with some "Red" rabble-rousers, in the park.

Only their youngest son, Tommy (George P. Breakston), manages to stay out of trouble, doing his homework. Tommy thinks their dad is all right, even better than "that guy on the radio", who they don't know is their father.

It's only after "Uncle Dudley" gets a concussion, after being hit with a brick, quelling a riot of "Reds", in the park that his family begin to value his worth, and, Phil's, if they all live to appreciate it.

== Cast ==
- William Collier Sr. as Ellery Cushing aka Uncle Dudley
- Lucile Gleason as Mrs. Cushing
- Russell Hopton as Phil Stardon
- George P. Breakston as Tommy Cushing
- William Janney as Robert Cushing
- Gloria Shea as Ruth Cushing
- Clarence Wilson as H. T. Flintly, News Record Editor
- Jameson Thomas as Jerry Franklin, Ruth's Beau
- Richard Tucker as J. W. Blair, Atlas Broadcasting
- David Hanna as The savage, Atlas Broadcasting

== Production ==
This film is based on the short story "Your Uncle William" by Michael Kane, published in The Saturday Evening Post.

William Collier signed in June 1934. The film marked Lucile Gleason's return to movies after a break. Arthur Lubin became attached to direct in July.

In August 1934 the film was officially put on Monogram's slate.

It was the first film directed by Arthur Lubin who had been an actor and had directed theatre. Lubin says it was shot in five days. Another account he says it was six days and estimates his fee was $500.

== Reception ==
Lubin said "when it was reviewed in The Hollywood Reporter the headline was 'A Successful Failure: Aptly Titled'. I didn't think I'd ever be able to direct again!" However he went on to direct two more films for Monogram, thus launching his career.

Diabolique magazine called it 'a creaky comedy-drama about a doddery old reporter... whose family treats him with contempt; he goes on to earns their respect by interrupting his son's communist rally, becoming a radio star and slut shaming his daughter.' They added, 'these sort of worm-turns family dramas were surprisingly common in the thirties (Frank Capra made a bunch), and could be made watchable by strong actors and direction. However Successful Failure's cast was poor and Lubin's handling uneasy.'
