= Trouble in Store (disambiguation) =

Trouble in Store is a 1953 comedy film starring Norman Wisdom. The title may also refer to:

- Trouble in Store (1934 film), another comedy
- "Trouble in Store", an episode of the animated television show Tales from the Cryptkeeper
- "Trouble in Store", an episode of the animated television sitcom The Goode Family
- "Trouble in Store", an episode of the American animated show Brandy & Mr. Whiskers
- "Trouble in Store", an episode of the British children's show ChuckleVision
- "Trouble in Store", an episode of the BBC documentary series Traffic Cops
