= The Secrets of Wu Sin =

1932 film

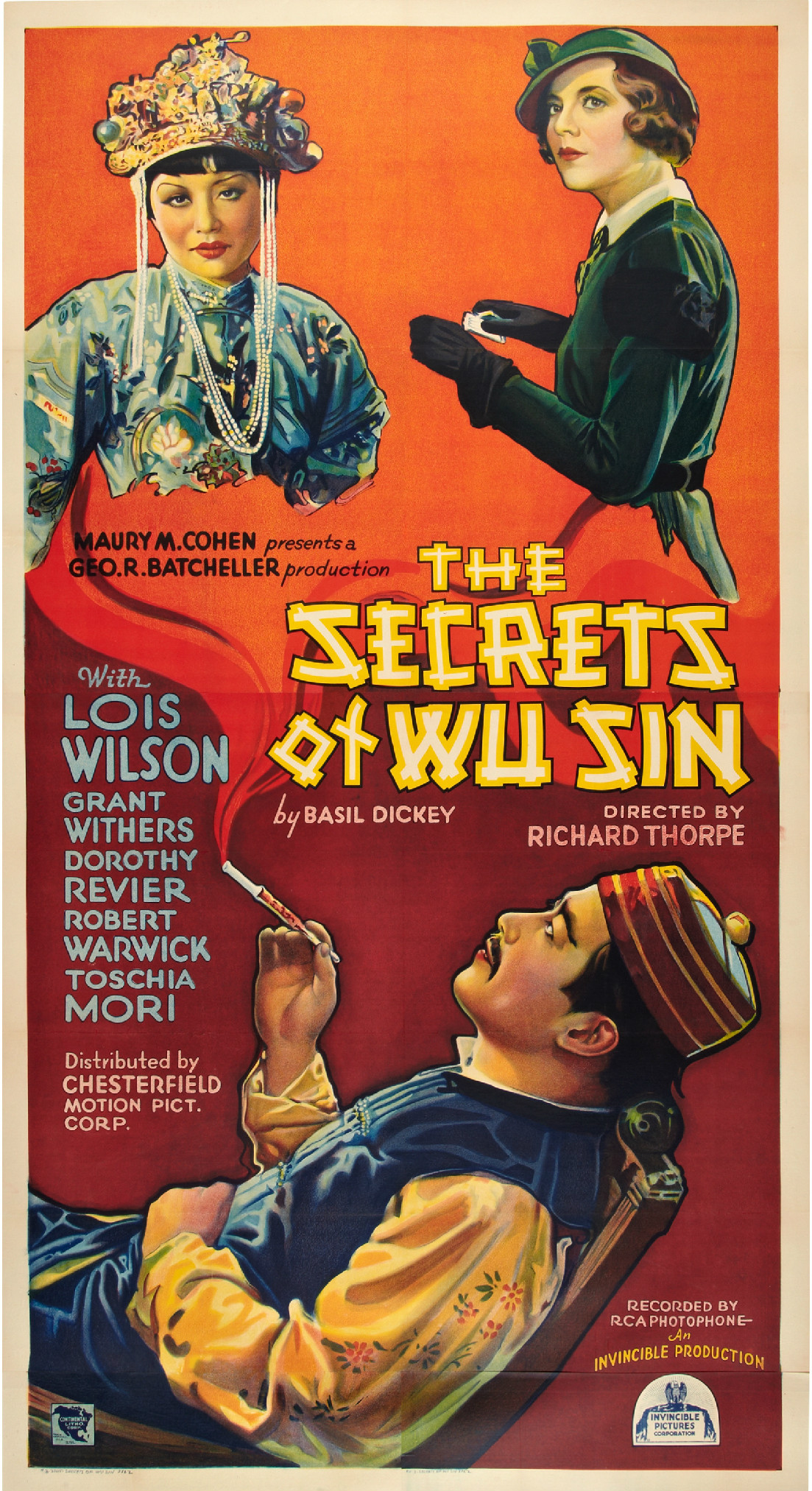
- lobby poster
- Directed by: Richard Thorpe
- Written by: Betty Burbridge; Basil Dickey; William McGrath
- Produced by: George R. Batcheller
- Starring: Lois Wilson; Grant Withers; Dorothy Revier
- Cinematography: M.A. Anderson
- Edited by: Vera Wade
- Production company: Invincible Pictures
- Distributed by: Chesterfield Pictures
- Release date: December 15, 1932
- Running time: 65 minutes
- Country: United States
- Language: English

The Secrets of Wu Sin is a 1932 American pre-Code mystery film directed by Richard Thorpe and starring Lois Wilson, Grant Withers and Dorothy Revier. It was made by the Poverty Row studio Chesterfield Pictures.

== Plot ==
James Manning, a newspaper editor, is visiting a drugstore when a young woman, Nona Gould, tries to buy poison, allegedly for a sick dog. The pharmacist refuses her; after she leaves, he comments to Manning that she will probably throw herself off a bridge. Manning follows her back to her apartment and breaks in just as she has turned on the gas in a suicide attempt. Learning that she is a failed writer, he promises her a job as a reporter.

Some weeks later, Nona is working at the paper. Manning receives a visit from his fiancée, Margaret King, and her wealthy father Roger. They discuss Manning's ongoing attempt to expose a criminal gang that is smuggling Chinese workers into the country. Manning assigns a veteran reporter, Morgan, to the investigation. Nona wants in on the story; when Manning refuses, she decides to investigate on her own. In Chinatown she makes contact with Miao Lin, a young woman who wants to marry her boyfriend, Charlie San. Miao Lin's guardian, the curio dealer Wu Sin, stands in their way.

Working on separate tracks, Nona and Morgan discover that Wu Sin is behind the smuggling ring, which is financed by Roger King. Nona visits the King residence to warn Margaret of her father's complicity. Margaret is indignant and asks Nona if she is in love with Manning. Nona acknowledges that she is. Realizing that he has been identified, Roger visits Wu Sin and the two agree that Manning must be dealt with. A meeting of the Tong sentences him to death, and Wu Sin tells Charlie that he has been chosen as the assassin, the price of Miao Lin's hand. Charlie reluctantly agrees.

Margaret visits Manning to ask him not to publish. When he refuses, she returns her engagement ring, scornfully telling him to give it to Nona instead. The newspaper publishes its exposé, while Charlie's attempt to assassinate Manning fails. The police break into Wu Sin's apartments and find him dead. Roger King flees abroad. Manning weds Nona while Charlie marries Miao Lin.

== Main cast ==
- Lois Wilson as Nona Gould
- Grant Withers as James Manning
- Dorothy Revier as Margaret King
- Robert Warwick as Roger King
- Tetsu Komai as Wu Sin
- Toshia Mori as Miao Lin
- Richard Loo as Charlie San
- Eddie Boland as Eddie Morgan
- Luke Chan as Luke
- James Wang as Pete

== Bibliography ==
- Pitts, Michael R. Poverty Row Studios, 1929-1940. McFarland & Company, 2005.
