= June Clyde =

American actress (1909–1987)

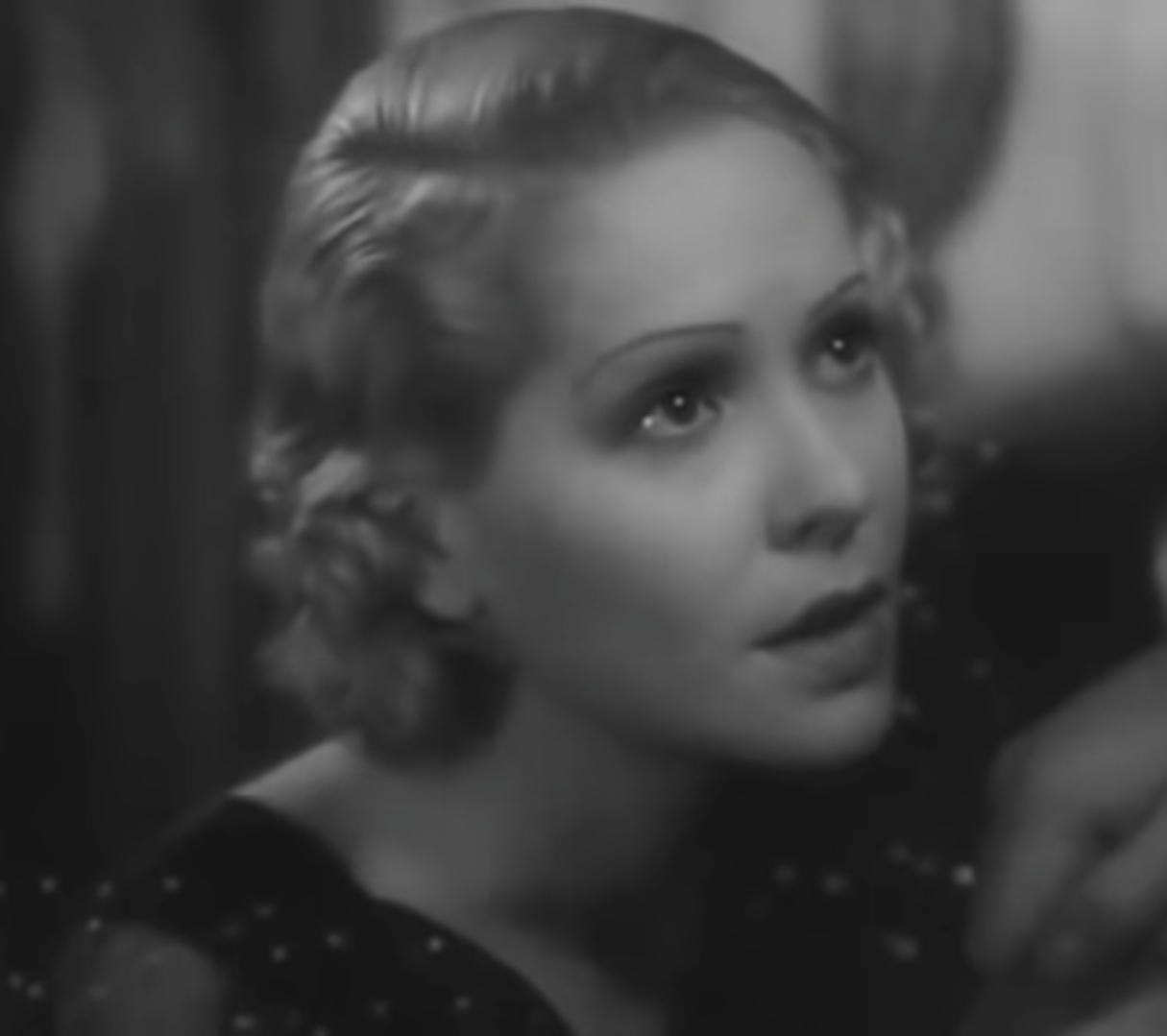
- Clyde in A Study in Scarlet (1933)
- Born: Ina Parton; December 2, 1909; Maysville, Missouri, U.S.
- Died: October 1, 1987 (aged 77); Fort Lauderdale, Florida, U.S.
- Occupations: Singer; dancer; actress
- Years active: 1929–1957
- Spouse: Thornton Freeland

June Clyde (born Ina Parton, December 2, 1909 – October 1, 1987) was an American actress, singer and dancer known for roles in such pre-Code films as A Strange Adventure (1932) and A Study in Scarlet (1933).

== Early years ==
June Clyde was born on December 2, 1909, near Maysville, Missouri, as Ina Parton.

She was the third child of William Arthur Parton and Orpha Dorothy Day. William and Orpha divorced about 1913, when Orpha took the three girls to live in St. Joseph, Missouri. The girls were nieces of actress Leona Hutton. By 1915, the family moved to Arbuckle, California. Around 1916, Orpha married Harvey Arthur Clyde.

== Career ==
When Clyde was six years old, she appeared on stage as Baby Tetrazinia. When she was 19, she starred in the film Tanned Legs (1929).

She was a WAMPAS Baby Star of 1932 and she progressed in a career in Hollywood films before marrying film director Thornton Freeland. Clyde moved to England with her husband and appeared in several British films and stage productions starting in 1934, as well as returning to the United States periodically for both stage and film work.

On Broadway, Clyde portrayed Annabel Lewis in Hooray For What! (1937) and Sally Trowbridge in Banjo Eyes (1941). She was part of a production of Annie Get Your Gun that toured in Australia, including a month in Sydney.

== Personal life and death ==
Clyde married Freeland in Hollywood on September 12, 1930.

== Filmography ==
- Street Girl (1929) - Hot Blonde at McGregor's (uncredited)
- Side Street (1929) - Judy - the Singer (uncredited)
- Tanned Legs (1929) - Peggy Reynolds
- Hit the Deck (1929) - Toddy
- The Cuckoos (1930) - Ruth Chester
- Midnight Mystery (1930) - Louise Hollister
- Humanettes (1930, Short)
- Arizona (1931) - Bonita 'Bonnie' Palmer
- The Mad Parade (1931) - Janice Lee
- Morals for Women (1931) - Lorraine Huston
- Branded Men (1931) - Dale Wilson
- The Secret Witness (1931) - Tess Jones
- Steady Company (1932) - Peggy
- The Cohens and Kellys in Hollywood (1932) - Kitty Kelly
- Racing Youth (1932) - Ameliz Cruickshank
- Radio Patrol (1932) - Vern Wiley
- Thrill of Youth (1932) - Jill Fenwick
- Back Street (1932) - Freda Schmidt
- The All American (1932) - Betty Poe
- The Finishing Touch (1932, Short)
- Tess of the Storm Country (1932) - Teola Garfield
- A Strange Adventure (1932) - 'Nosey' Toodles
- Oh! My Operation (1932, Short)
- File 113 (1933) - Madeline
- Forgotten (1933) - Lena Strauss
- Room Mates (1933, Short)
- A Study in Scarlet (1933) - Eileen Forrester
- Hold Me Tight (1933) - Dottie
- Her Resale Value (1933) - Mary Harris
- Only Yesterday (1933) - Deborah
- I Hate Women (1934) - Anne Meredith
- Hollywood Party (1934) - Linda Clemp
- Hollywood Mystery (1934) - Doris Dawn
- Dance Band (1935) - Pat Shelley
- No Monkey Business (1935) - Clare Barrington
- She Shall Have Music (1935) - Dorothy Drew
- Charing Cross Road (1935) - Pam
- King of the Castle (1936) - Marilyn Bean
- Land Without Music (1936) - Sadie Whistler
- Aren't Men Beasts! (1937) - Marie
- Let's Make a Night of It (1937) - Peggy Boydell
- Make-Up (1937) - Joy
- School for Husbands (1937) - Diana Cheswick
- Intimate Relations (1937) - Molly Morell
- Sam Small Leaves Town (1937) - Sally Elton
- Weddings Are Wonderful (1938) - Cora Sutherland
- His Lordship Goes to Press (1938) - Valerie Lee
- Country Fair (1941) - Pepper Wilson
- Unfinished Business (1941) - Clarisse
- Sealed Lips (1942) - Lois Grant
- Hi'ya, Chum (1943) - Madge Tracy
- Seven Doors to Death (1944) - Mary Rawling
- Hollywood and Vine (1945) - Gloria Devine
- Behind the Mask (1946) - Edith Merrill
- Night Without Stars (1951) - Claire
- Treasure Hunt (1952) - Mrs. Cleghorne-Thomas
- 24 Hours of a Woman's Life (1952) - Mrs. Roche
- The Love Lottery (1954) - Viola
- After the Ball (1957) - Lottie Gilson
- The Vise (1957) - Mrs. Forbes
- The Story of Esther Costello (1957)

== Stage credits ==
- 1934 - Lucky Break, London musical
- 1935 - The Flying Trapeze, London musical
- 1937 - Hooray for What!, Broadway musical
- 1941 - Banjo Eyes, Broadway musical
- 1948 - Born Yesterday, Australian production
