= John Darrow =

American actor (1907–1980)

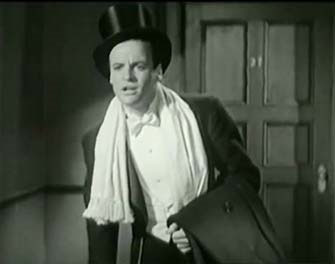
- John Darrow in The Lady Refuses (1931)
- Born: Harry Simpson; July 17, 1907; Leonia, New Jersey, U.S.
- Died: February 24, 1980 (aged 72); Malibu, California, U.S.
- Occupation: Actor
- Years active: 1927–1935
- Partner: Charles Walters (1936-1980)

John Darrow (born Harry Simpson; 17 July 1907 – 24 February 1980) was an American actor of the late silent and early talking film eras. He is the uncle of actress Barbara Darrow.

== Biography ==
Born in Leonia, New Jersey in 1907, Darrow began acting in theater with a stock company, right after graduating high school. Shortly after, he would begin his film career with a featured role in the 1927 silent film, High School Hero. After several films with featured roles, he was cast as the lead in 1931's The Lady Refuses, which co-stars Betty Compson and was directed by George Archainbaud. He would spend the next five years in leading man or featured roles, before retiring from acting in 1935. He would appear in five films that year, although four of them were produced in 1934. His final screen appearance would be in a supporting role in Annapolis Farewell.

Although he retired from acting, he did not leave the film industry and instead continued on to become a very successful agent. From the 1930s to the early 1950s, he was in a relationship with (future) film director Charles Walters.

== Filmography ==
(Per AFI database)

- Long Pants (1927) - Minor Role
- The High School Hero (1927) - Bill Merrill
- Avalanche (1928) - Verde
- Prep and Pep (1928) - Flash Wells
- The Racket (1928) - Dave Ames
- The Argyle Case (1929) - Bruce Argyle
- Girls Gone Wild (1929) - Speed Wade
- Cheer Up and Smile (1930) - Tom
- Hell's Angels (1930) - Karl Armstedt
- Primrose Path (1931) - Buck Randall
- Ten Nights in a Bar Room (1931) - Frank Slade
- The Lady Refuses (1931) - Russell Courtney
- Everything's Rosie (1931) - Billy Lowe
- Fanny Foley Herself (1931) - Teddy
- The Bargain (1931) - Roderick White
- Alias Mary Smith (1932) - Robert Hayes
- The Midnight Lady (1932) - Bert
- Probation (1932) - Nick Jarrett
- Forbidden Company (1932) - Jerry Grant
- The All American (1932) - Bob King
- Maizie (1933) - Boyd Kenton
- Midshipman Jack (1933) - Clark Simpson
- The Big Chance (1933) - Knockout Frankie "Rocky" Morgan
- The Big Race (1933) - Bob Hamilton
- Strange People (1933) - Jimmy Allen
- Monte Carlo Nights (1934) - Larry Sturgis
- Flirtation Walk (1934) - Chase
- I Like It That Way (1934) - Harry Rogers
- The Curtain Falls (1934) - Allan Scorsby
- I Give My Love (1934) - Alex Blair
- Square Shooter (1935) - Johnny Lloyd
- Symphony of Living (1935) - Richard Grieg
- A Notorious Gentleman (1935) - Terry Bradford
- Eight Bells (1935) - Carl
- Annapolis Farewell (1935) - Porter
