= Money Means Nothing (1934 film) =

1934 film directed by Christy Cabanne

- Directed by: Christy Cabanne
- Written by: Frances Hyland
- Produced by: C.C. Burr
- Starring: Wallace Ford; Gloria Shea; Edgar Kennedy
- Cinematography: Robert H. Planck
- Edited by: Jack Ogilvie
- Production company: Monogram Pictures
- Release date: June 14, 1934 (US)
- Running time: 70 minutes
- Country: United States
- Language: English

Money Means Nothing is a 1934 American drama film, directed by Christy Cabanne. It stars Wallace Ford, Gloria Shea, and Edgar Kennedy, and was released on June 14, 1934.

== Cast ==
- Wallace Ford as Ken McKay
- Gloria Shea as Julie Ferris McKay
- Edgar Kennedy as Herbert Green
- Vivien Oakland as Helen Whitney
- Maidel Turner as Mrs. Green
- Betty Blythe as Mrs. Ferris
- Eddie Tamblyn as Robby Ferris
- Richard Tucker as George Whitney
- Tenen Holtz as Silverman
- Ann Brody as Mrs. Silverman
