= Theodore von Eltz =

American actor (1893–1964)

Julius Theodore von Eltz
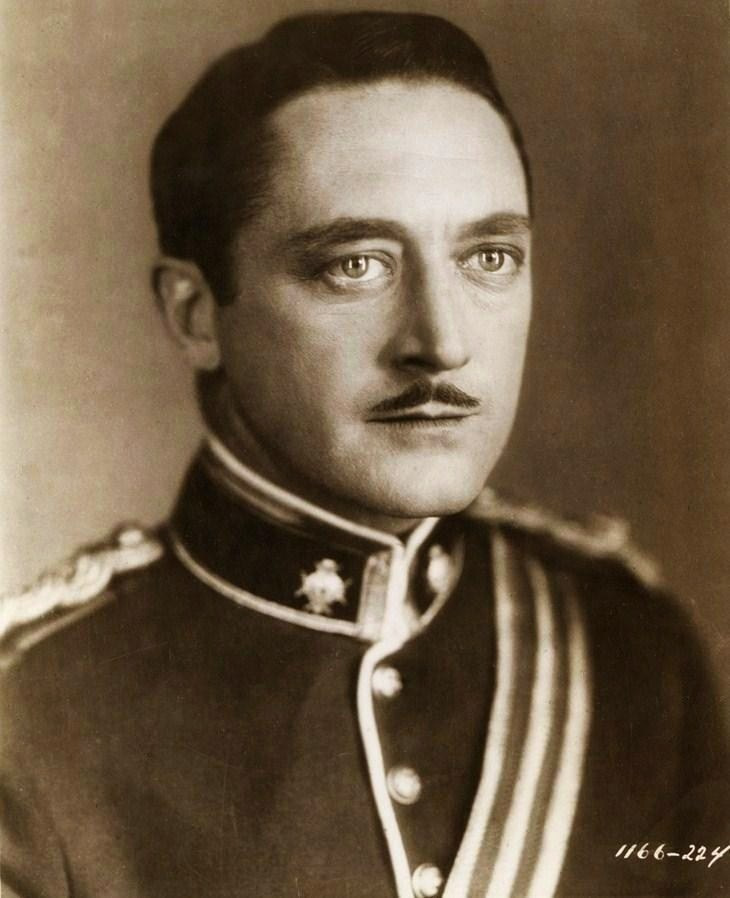
- In The Four Feathers
- Born: November 5, 1893
- Died: October 6, 1964 (aged 70)
- Occupation: Actor
- Years active: 1915-1957
- Spouse: Peggy Prior (1921-1928; divorced)
- Children: 2, including Lori March

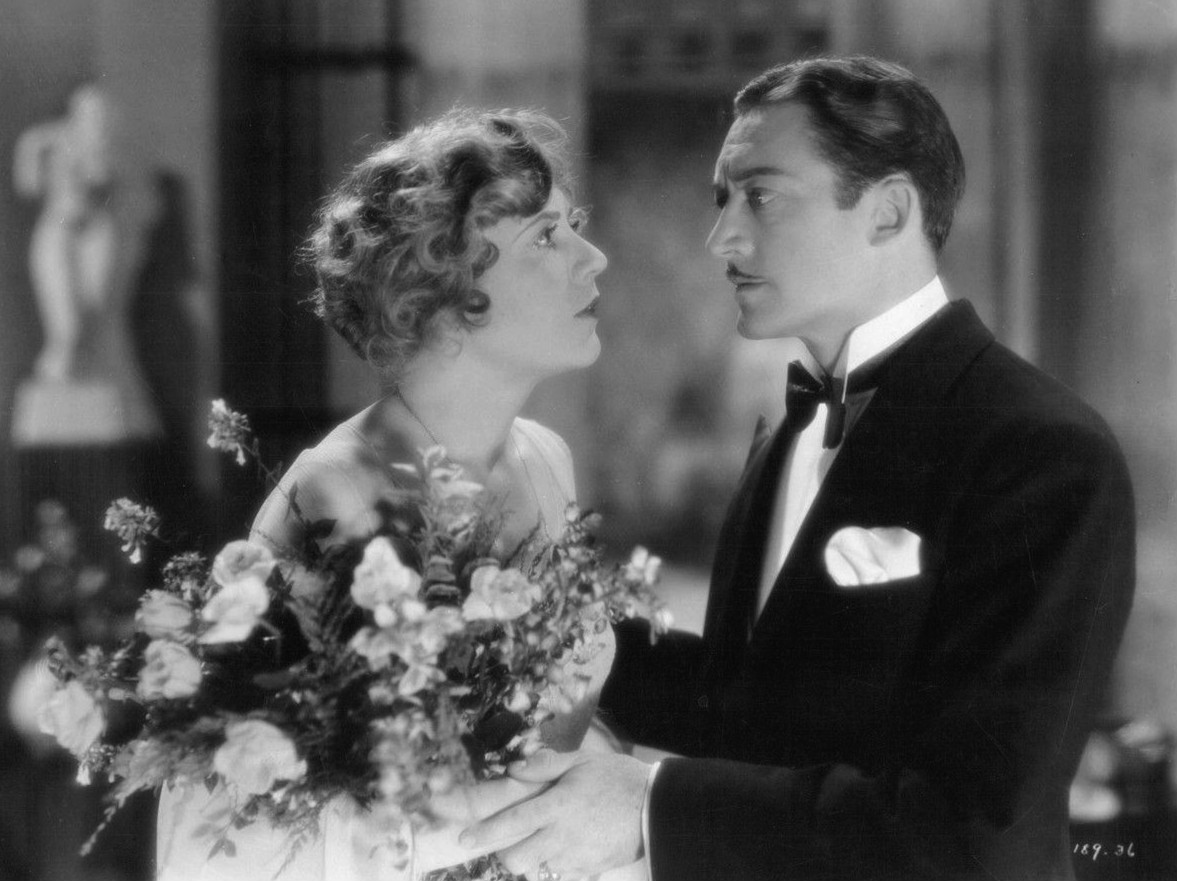
with Lois Wilson in a scene from The Furies (1930)

Julius Theodore von Eltz (November 5, 1893 – October 6, 1964) was an American film actor, appearing in more than 200 films between 1915 and 1957. He was the father of actress Lori March.

== Early life ==
Born in New Haven, Connecticut, Von Eltz was a Yale University professor's son. After 12 years at an eastern private boarding school, he served in France for eight months during World War I. He followed his war experience with ventures into oil fields in Texas and on the stage in New York.

In September 1921, von Eltz married Peggy Prior. They had a daughter, Lori, and a son, Theodore, Jr. In 1928, the couple separated, reconciled, and finally divorced on November 7. he died in Woodland Hills CA of heart failure.

== Filmography ==
- His Wife (1915) - Harry Dennys
- The Traffic Cop (1916) - Casey's Brother
- The Man Who Had Everything (1920) - Master of Ceremonies at Party (uncredited)
- Extravagance (1921) - Dick Vane
- The Old Nest (1921) - Stephen McLeod
- The Speed Girl (1921) - Tom Manley
- The Fourteenth Lover (1922) - Clyde Van Ness
- The Girl from Rocky Point (1922) - Robert Giffing
- Extra! Extra! (1922) - Fordney Stowe
- Sherlock Brown (1922) - Frank Morton
- Manslaughter (1922) - (uncredited)
- The Glorious Fool (1922) - Senior Surgical Interne
- Can a Woman Love Twice? (1923) - Thomas Jefferson Grant
- The Woman With Four Faces (1923) - Jim Hartigan
- Lights Out (1923) - 'Eggs'
- Tiger Rose (1923) - Bruce Norton
- The Breaking Point (1924) - Fred Gregory
- Being Respectable (1924) - Stephen O'Connell
- That French Lady (1924) - John Hemmingway
- The Turmoil (1924) - James Sheridan Jr.
- Hearts of Oak (1924) - Ned Fairweather
- Locked Doors (1925) - John Talbot
- On Thin Ice (1925) - Dr. Paul Jackson
- White Fang (1925) - Weadon Scott
- The Sporting Chance (1925) - Robert Selby
- The Thoroughbred (1925) - Robert Bemis
- Paint and Powder (1925) - Jimmy Evarts
- Broadway Lady (1925) - Bob Westbrook
- The Red Kimona (1925) - Freddy - the Chauffeur
- A Desperate Moment (1926) - Captain John Reynolds
- Queen o'Diamonds (1926) - Daniel Hammon
- The Last Alarm (1926) - Joe, Tom's Pal
- The Sea Wolf (1926) - Humphrey Van Weyden
- Laddie (1926) - Robert Paget
- Bardelys the Magnificent (1926) - René de Lesperon
- Fools of Fashion (1926) - Matthew Young
- His New York Wife (1926) - Philip Thorne
- Raggedy Rose (1926) - Minor Role (uncredited)
- Redheads Preferred (1926) - John Morgan
- The Nickel-Hopper (1926, Short) - Jimmy Jessop, Paddy's Rich Beau
- No Man's Law (1927) - Spider O'Day
- Perch of the Devil (1927) - Lord Mobray
- Great Mail Robbery (1927) - Lieutenant Donald Macready
- One Woman to Another (1927) - John Bruce
- Should Tall Men Marry? (1928, Short) - Teddy
- The Way of the Strong (1928) - Dan
- Life's Mockery (1928) - Wade Fullerton
- Nothing to Wear (1928) - Phil Stanndish
- The Rescue (1929) - Carter
- The Voice of the Storm (1929) - Franklin Wells
- The Four Feathers (1929) - Lt. Castleton
- The Awful Truth (1929) - Edgar Trent
- The Very Idea (1929) - George Green
- The Furies (1930) - Lwen McDonald
- The Divorcee (1930) - Ivan (uncredited)
- The Arizona Kid (1930) - Dick Hoyt
- Sweeping Against the Winds (1930) - Unknown role
- Love Among the Millionaires (1930) - William Jordan
- Kismet (1930) - The Guide Nazir
- The Cat Creeps (1930) - Harry Blythe
- Inspiration (1931) - Normand (uncredited)
- The Prodigal (1931) - Carter Jerome
- Beyond Victory (1931) - Major Sparks
- The Secret Six (1931) - District Attorney Keeler
- Up Pops the Devil (1931) - Gilbert Morrell
- Five and Ten (1931) - Ramon (uncredited)
- Wicked (1931) - Tony Rande
- Susan Lenox (1931) - Kemper (uncredited)
- Once a Lady (1931) - Harry Cosden
- Heartbreak (1931) - Military Prosecutor
- West of Broadway (1931) - Tony (uncredited)
- Ladies of the Big House (1931) - Frazer
- A Private Scandal (1931) - Matthew Gray
- Hotel Continental (1932) - Jim Bennett
- The Wet Parade (1932) - Night Club Patron (uncredited)
- Huddle (1932) - Mr. Pearson (uncredited)
- The Midnight Lady (1932) - Byron Crosby
- Strangers of the Evening (1932) - Dr. Raymond Everette
- Drifting Souls (1932) - Joe Robson
- A Scarlet Week-End (1932) - The Husband
- The Red-Haired Alibi (1932) - Trent Travers
- Breach of Promise (1932) - District Attorney
- The Unwritten Law (1932) - Val Lewis
- Self Defense (1932) - Tim Reed
- No Other Woman (1933) - Sutherland
- Her Splendid Folly (1933) - Wallace Morley / John Ebbetts
- Luxury Liner (1933) - Exl
- Secrets (1933) - Robert Carlton
- High Gear (1933) - Larry 'Keyhole' Winston
- The Eleventh Commandment (1933) - Wayne Winters
- Pleasure Cruise (1933) - Murchison
- Kiss of Araby (1933) - Capt. J.G. Randall
- Bondage (1933) - Member of Review Board (uncredited)
- Jennie Gerhardt (1933) - Robert Kane
- Arizona to Broadway (1933) - Hubert Wayne
- Dance Girl Dance (1933) - Phil Norton
- Gigolettes of Paris (1933) - Albert Valraine
- Master of Men (1933) - Grenaker
- This Side of Heaven (1934) - Doctor (uncredited)
- Love Past Thirty (1934) - Charles Browne
- Change of Heart (1934) - Gerald Mockby
- Call It Luck (1934) - Nat Underwood
- Elinor Norton (1934) - Army Officer (uncredited)
- The Silver Streak (1934) - Ed Tyler
- Bright Eyes (1934) - J. Wellington Smythe
- Grand Old Girl (1935) - Mr. George S. Webster (uncredited)
- Private Worlds (1935) - Dr. Harding
- Behind the Green Lights (1935) - John C. Owen
- The Headline Woman (1935) - Johnny 'Full House' Corinti
- The Murder Man (1935) - James Spencer Halford (uncredited)
- Smart Girl (1935) - Fred Barton (uncredited)
- Trails of the Wild (1935) - Inspector Kincaid
- Streamline Express (1935) - (uncredited)
- His Night Out (1935) - Parsons
- Confidential (1935) - Mr. Walsh
- Three Kids and a Queen (1935) - Federal Man (uncredited)
- Rendezvous (1935) - Desk Clerk Assistant (uncredited)
- Magnificent Obsession (1935) - Dr. Preston
- Love Before Breakfast (1936) - Clerk (uncredited)
- The Road to Glory (1936) - Major
- Below the Deadline (1936) - Flash Ackroyd
- Ticket to Paradise (1936) - George Small
- Suzy (1936) - Revue Producer
- High Tension (1936) - Noble Harrison
- I Cover Chinatown (1936) - Clark Duryea
- Adventure in Manhattan (1936) - John Ridley - Henchman (uncredited)
- Under Your Spell (1936) - Cynthia's Lawyer (uncredited)
- Sinner Take All (1936) - David
- Mind Your Own Business (1936) - District Attorney Adams
- Beloved Enemy (1936) - Sean O'Brien
- A Man Betrayed (1936) - Burns
- Under Cover of Night (1937) - John Lamont
- Criminal Lawyer (1937) - Larkin's Attorney (uncredited)
- Clarence (1937) - Tobias
- Sea Devils (1937) - Court Martial Prosecutor (uncredited)
- Jim Hanvey, Detective (1937) - Dunn
- California Straight Ahead! (1937) - James Gifford
- The Emperor's Candlesticks (1937) - Adjutant to Prince Johann (uncredited)
- Topper (1937) - Hotel Manager
- The Firefly (1937) - Captain Pierlot (uncredited)
- Youth on Parole (1937) - Public Defender
- Stage Door (1937) - Elsworth (uncredited)
- The Westland Case (1937) - Robert Westland
- Stand-In (1937) - Sir Geoffrey - 'Sex and Satan' (uncredited)
- Fight for Your Lady (1937) - Wrestling Spectator (uncredited)
- Blondes at Work (1938) - District Attorney
- The Adventures of Marco Polo (1938) - Venetian Business Man (uncredited)
- Marie Antoinette (1938) - Officer in Entrance Hall (uncredited)
- Delinquent Parents (1938) - Carson
- Letter of Introduction (1938) - First Doctor - Midtown Hospital (uncredited)
- Smashing the Rackets (1938) - Howard Ellis (uncredited)
- I Am the Law (1938) - Martin - Club Owner (uncredited)
- Persons in Hiding (1939) - Attorney Jenson (uncredited)
- Pardon Our Nerve (1939) - Lucky Carson
- Inside Story (1939) - Whitey
- They Made Her a Spy (1939) - Colonel Page
- The Story of Vernon and Irene Castle (1939) - Minor Role (uncredited)
- The Sun Never Sets (1939) - Delafons
- Fifth Avenue Girl (1939) - Terwilliger
- Full Confession (1939) - Prosecutor (uncredited)
- Legion of Lost Flyers (1939) - Bill Desert
- The Night of Nights (1939) - John (uncredited)
- Little Old New York (1940) - Washington Irving
- Dr. Ehrlich's Magic Bullet (1940) - Dr. Kraus
- Teddy, the Rough Rider (1940, Short) - William Loeb
- The Saint Takes Over (1940) - Shipboard Card Cheat (uncredited)
- A Dispatch from Reuters (1940) - Actor in 'Our American Cousin' (uncredited)
- The Old Swimmin' Hole (1940) - Baker, Grandpa's Lawyer
- Life with Henry (1940) - Mr. Rappaport (uncredited)
- The Son of Monte Cristo (1940) - Captain
- The Great Plane Robbery (1940) - Rod Brothers
- Kitty Foyle (1940) - Hotel Clerk (uncredited)
- Play Girl (1941) - Mr. Hunter (uncredited)
- Ellery Queen's Penthouse Mystery (1941) - Jim Ritter
- A Shot in the Dark (1941) - George Kilpatrick
- I'll Wait for You (1941) - Cassell
- Sergeant York (1941) - Prison Camp Commander (uncredited)
- A Tragedy at Midnight (1942) - Third Charles Miller (uncredited)
- The Great Man's Lady (1942) - Hank Allen (uncredited)
- Lady in a Jam (1942) - Dr. Elsworth (uncredited)
- The Man in the Trunk (1942) - Theodore Swann
- Quiet Please, Murder (1942) - Lucas (uncredited)
- Stand by for Action (1942) - 'Commander' (uncredited)
- Air Force (1943) - First Lieutenant (uncredited)
- Flight for Freedom (1943) - Cmdr. George (uncredited)
- The Bridge of San Luis Rey (1944) - Officer (uncredited)
- Follow the Boys (1944) - William Barrett
- Bermuda Mystery (1944) - Lee Cooper
- Since You Went Away (1944) - Hotel Desk Clerk (uncredited)
- The Unwritten Code (1944) - Major Spencer (uncredited)
- Hollywood Canteen (1944) - Canteen Director (uncredited)
- Rhapsody in Blue (1945) - Foley
- Saratoga Trunk (1945) - Hotel Manager (uncredited)
- The Big Sleep (1946) - Arthur Gwynn Geiger (uncredited)
- The Hucksters (1947) - Radio Voice (uncredited)
- Devil's Cargo (1948) - Thomas Mallon
- The Reformer and the Redhead (1950) - KWHE Radio Program Director (uncredited)
- Trial Without Jury (1950) - Philip Mannings
- Painting the Clouds with Sunshine (1951) - Whiteside (uncredited)
- Raiders of the Seven Seas (1953) - Sultan's Aide (uncredited)
- The Sea Around Us (1953) - Mr. Culpepper (scenes deleted)
- The Unholy Wife (1957) - McNeil, Fingerprint Expert (uncredited)
