= Racing Youth =

1932 film

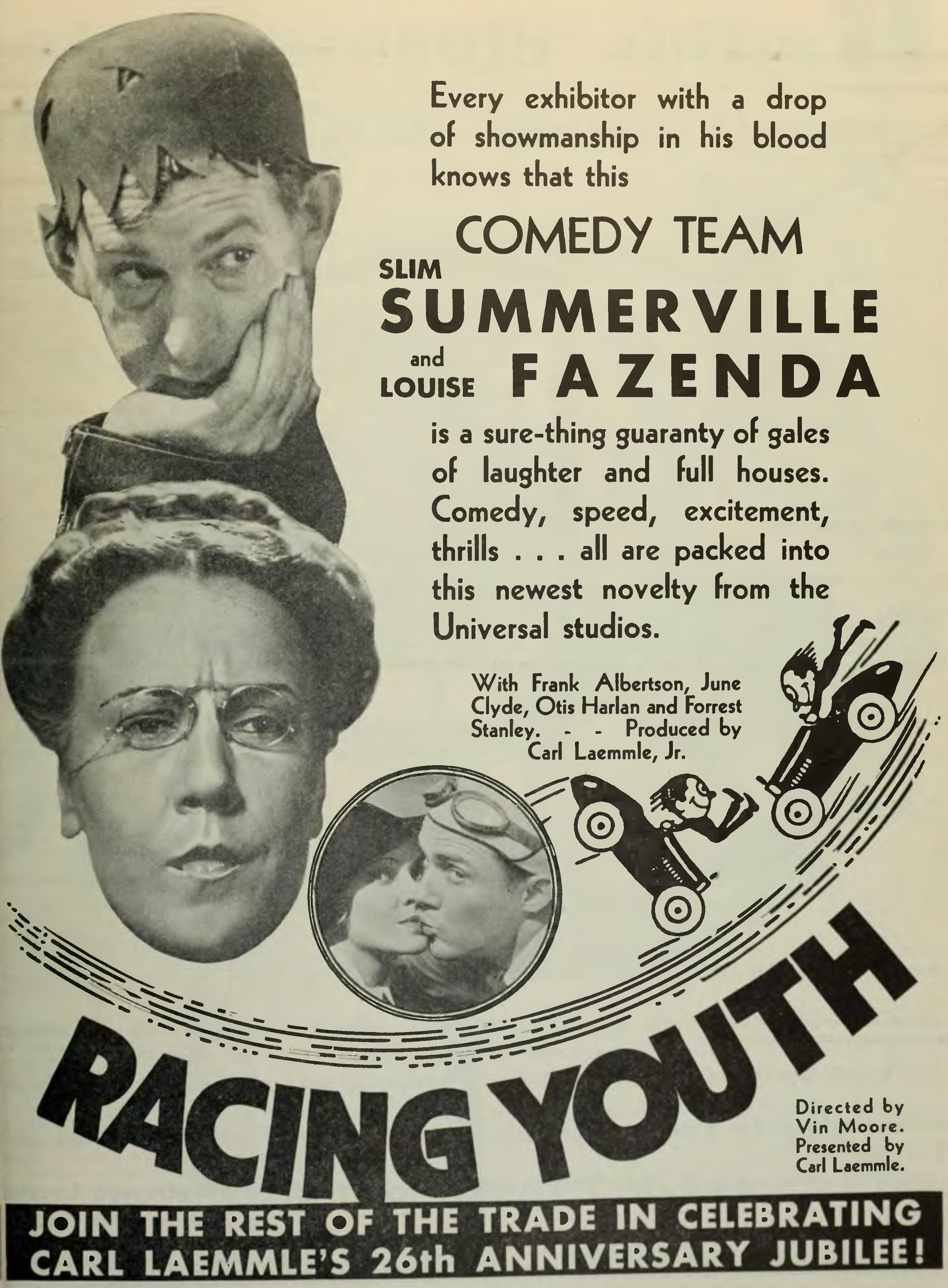
- Directed by: Vin Moore
- Screenplay by: Earle Snell
- Story by: Earle Snell
- Produced by: Carl Laemmle, Jr.
- Starring: Slim Summerville; Louise Fazenda; Frank Albertson; June Clyde; Arthur Stuart Hull; Forrest Stanley
- Cinematography: George Robinson
- Edited by: Harry W. Lieb
- Music by: Irving Bibo
- Production company: Universal Pictures
- Distributed by: Universal Pictures
- Release date: April 1, 1932
- Running time: 62 minutes
- Country: United States
- Language: English

Racing Youth is a 1932 American pre-Code drama film directed by Vin Moore and written by Earle Snell. The film stars Slim Summerville, Louise Fazenda, Frank Albertson, June Clyde, Arthur Stuart Hull and Forrest Stanley. The film was released on April 1, 1932, by Universal Pictures.

== Cast ==
- Slim Summerville as Slim
- Louise Fazenda as Daisy Joy
- Frank Albertson as Teddy Blue
- June Clyde as Amelia Cruickshank
- Arthur Stuart Hull as Brown
- Forrest Stanley as Sanford
- Eddie Phillips as Van
- Otis Harlan as Dave
