= A Demon for Trouble =

- Lobby card
- Directed by: Robert F. Hill
- Written by: Jack Natteford
- Produced by: A. W. Hackel
- Starring: Bob Steele; Don Alvarado; Gloria Shea; Nick Stuart
- Cinematography: William C. Thompson
- Edited by: William Austin
- Production company: Supreme Pictures
- Distributed by: Supreme Pictures
- Release date: August 10, 1934 (United States)
- Running time: 61 minutes
- Country: United States
- Language: English

A Demon for Trouble is a 1934 American black-and-white action/adventure/romance short film directed by Robert F. Hill and produced by A. W. Hackel for Supreme Pictures. It stars Bob Steele, Don Alvarado, Gloria Shea, and Nick Stuart and was released in the United States on August 10, 1934.

Bob Steele had just left Monogram Pictures. The film was the first of an eight-picture contract he signed with Sam Katzman's Supreme Pictures.

== Plot ==
Falsely blamed for the killing of Buck Morton (Nick Stuart), Bob Worth (Bob Steele) is now on the run from the sheriff (Lafe McKee). Aided by the outlaw Gallinda (Don Alvarado), Bob sets out to clear his name by uncovering that the true murderer is real estate tycoon (Walter McGrail).

== Production ==
Nick Stuart played a key support role.

== See also ==
- Bob Steele filmography
