= Radio Patrol (1932 film) =

1932 film

- Directed by: Edward L. Cahn
- Screenplay by: Tom Reed; Richard Schayer
- Produced by: Carl Laemmle, Jr.
- Starring: Robert Armstrong; Russell Hopton; Lila Lee; June Clyde; Sidney Toler; Andy Devine
- Cinematography: Jackson Rose
- Edited by: Harry W. Lieb
- Production company: Universal Pictures
- Distributed by: Universal Pictures
- Release date: June 2, 1932
- Running time: 65 minutes
- Country: United States
- Language: English

Radio Patrol is a 1932 American pre-Code crime film directed by Edward L. Cahn, written by Tom Reed and Richard Schayer, and starring Robert Armstrong, Russell Hopton, Lila Lee, June Clyde, Sidney Toler and Andy Devine. It was released on June 2, 1932, by Universal Pictures.

== Cast ==
- Robert Armstrong as Bill Kennedy
- Russell Hopton as Pat Bourke
- Lila Lee as Sue Kennedy
- June Clyde as Vern Wiley
- Sidney Toler as Sgt. Tom Keogh
- Andy Devine as Pete Wiley
- Harry Woods as Kloskey
- Onslow Stevens as Carl Hughes
- John Lester Johnson as Smokey Johnson
- Noel Madison as Tony
- Dewey Robinson as Little Erny
- Herman Bing as Schwabacher, the Funeral Director (unaccredited)
