= Forbidden Company =

1932 film

- Directed by: Richard Thorpe
- Written by: Edward T. Lowe Jr.
- Starring: Sally Blane; John Darrow; John St. Polis
- Cinematography: M.A. Anderson
- Production company: Invincible Pictures
- Distributed by: Chesterfield Pictures
- Release date: June 15, 1932
- Running time: 67 minutes
- Country: United States
- Language: English

Forbidden Company is a 1932 American pre-Code drama film directed by Richard Thorpe and starring Sally Blane, John Darrow and John St. Polis.

== Plot ==
A rich young man falls for a model, but his father is vehemently opposed to the relationship.

== Cast ==
- Sally Blane as Barbara Blake
- John Darrow as Jerry Grant
- John St. Polis as David Grant
- Myrtle Stedman as Mrs. Henrietta Grant
- Josephine Dunn as Harriet Brown
- Dorothy Christy as Louelle Fenwick
- Bryant Washburn as Fletcher
- Norma Drew as Diane Grant

== Production ==
The film was completed in just 6 days, finishing in May 1932.

== Bibliography ==
- Pitts, Michael R. Poverty Row Studios, 1929-1940. McFarland & Company, 2005.
