= Black Gold (1936 film) =

1936 film by Russell Hopton

- Directed by: Russell Hopton
- Written by: Sascha Baraniey; Peter B. Kyne
- Produced by: Maurice Conn
- Starring: Frankie Darro; LeRoy Mason; Gloria Shea
- Cinematography: Arthur Reed
- Edited by: Richard G. Wray
- Music by: Oliver Wallace
- Production company: Conn Pictures Corporation
- Distributed by: Conn Pictures Corporation
- Release date: January 20, 1936
- Running time: 57 minutes
- Country: United States
- Language: English

Black Gold is a 1936 American action film directed by Russell Hopton and starring Frankie Darro, LeRoy Mason and Gloria Shea.

== Cast ==
- Frankie Darro as Clifford 'Fishtail' O'Reilly
- LeRoy Mason as Henry 'Hank' Langford
- Gloria Shea as Cynthia Jackson
- Berton Churchill as J.C. Anderson
- Stanley Fields as Lefty Stevens
- Frank Shannon as Dan O'Reilly
- George Cleveland as Clemmons
- Fred 'Snowflake' Toones as Snowflake
- Dewey Robinson as Homer

== Bibliography ==
- Michael R. Pitts. Poverty Row Studios, 1929-1940: An Illustrated History of 55 Independent Film Companies, with a Filmography for Each. McFarland & Company, 2005.
