= The King Murder =

1932 film

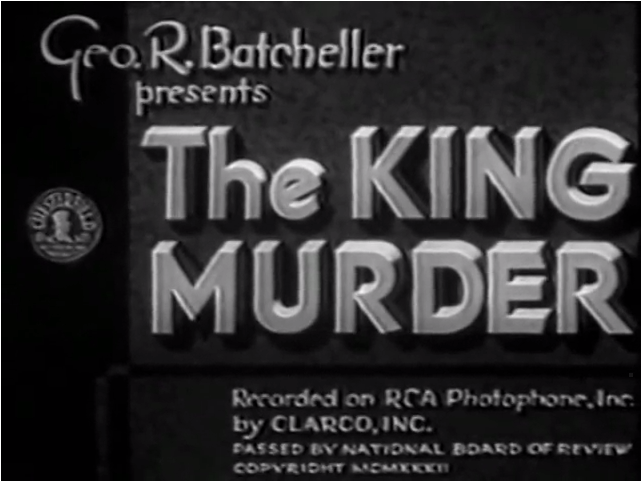
- Directed by: Richard Thorpe
- Written by: Charles Reed Jones
- Produced by: George R. Batcheller
- Starring: Conway Tearle; Natalie Moorhead; Marceline Day
- Cinematography: M.A. Anderson
- Edited by: Vera Wade
- Production company: Chesterfield Pictures
- Distributed by: Chesterfield Pictures
- Release date: October 10, 1932
- Running time: 67 minutes
- Country: United States
- Language: English

The King Murder is a 1932 American pre-Code mystery film directed by Richard Thorpe and starring Conway Tearle, Natalie Moorhead and Marceline Day.

== Plot ==
A beautiful blonde makes a career out of seducing and then blackmailing wealthy married men. She is found murdered after demanding a $5000 payoff from her latest victim, and the detective investigating the case finds out that she was involved in a lot more than just blackmail.

Full review at https://pre-code.com/the-king-murder-1932-review-with-conway-tearle-and-natalie-moorhead/

== Cast ==
- Conway Tearle as Detective Chief Henry Barton
- Natalie Moorhead as Elizabeth Hawthorn
- Marceline Day as Pearl Hope
- Dorothy Revier as Miriam King
- Don Alvarado as Jose Moreno
- Huntley Gordon as Arthur B. Bronnell
- Maurice Black as Philip Scott
- Robert Frazer as Van Kempen
- Rose Dione as Miss Duval, Maid

== Bibliography ==
- Pitts, Michael R. Poverty Row Studios, 1929-1940. McFarland & Company, 2005.
