= Strange People (1933 film) =

1933 film by Richard Thorpe

- Directed by: Richard Thorpe
- Written by: Jack Townley
- Produced by: George R. Batcheller
- Starring: John Darrow; Gloria Shea; Hale Hamilton
- Cinematography: M.A. Anderson
- Edited by: Vera Wade
- Production company: Chesterfield Pictures
- Distributed by: Chesterfield Pictures
- Release date: June 17, 1933
- Running time: 64 minutes
- Country: United States
- Language: English

Strange People is a 1933 American mystery film directed by Richard Thorpe and starring John Darrow, Gloria Shea and Hale Hamilton. It was produced by the independent Chesterfield Pictures.

== Cast ==
- John Darrow as Jimmy Allen - the Auto Salesman
- Gloria Shea as Helen Mason - the Secretary
- Hale Hamilton as J.E.Burton - the Attorney
- Wilfred Lucas as John Davis
- J. Frank Glendon as Robert Crandall - the Butler
- Michael Visaroff as Edwards - the Caretaker
- Jack Pennick as The Plumber
- Jerry Mandy as Tony Scabolotto - the Barber
- Lew Kelly as Smith - the Insurance Agent
- Jane Keckley as Mrs. Reed - the Seamstress
- Mary Foy as Mrs. Jones - the Housekeeper
- Frank LaRue as Kelly
- Stanley Blystone as Al Burke
- Walter Brennan as The Radio Repairman

== Bibliography ==
- Michael R. Pitts. Poverty Row Studios, 1929–1940: An Illustrated History of 55 Independent Film Companies, with a Filmography for Each. McFarland & Company, 2005.
