= The Midnight Lady =

1932 film

- Directed by: Richard Thorpe
- Written by: Edward T. Lowe Jr.
- Produced by: George R. Batcheller
- Starring: Sarah Padden; John Darrow; Claudia Dell
- Cinematography: M.A. Anderson
- Edited by: Vera Wade
- Production company: Chesterfield Pictures
- Distributed by: Chesterfield Pictures
- Release date: May 15, 1932
- Running time: 65 minutes
- Country: United States
- Language: English

The Midnight Lady is a 1932 American pre-Code crime film directed by Richard Thorpe and starring Sarah Padden, John Darrow and Claudia Dell. It is also known by the alternative title of Dream Mother.

== Cast ==
- Sarah Padden as Nita St. George
- John Darrow as Bert
- Claudia Dell as Jean Austin
- Theodore von Eltz as Byron Crosby
- Montagu Love as Harvey Austin
- Lucy Beaumont as Grandma Austin
- Lina Basquette as Mona Sebastian
- Donald Keith as Don Austin
- Brandon Hurst as District Attorney
- Wayne Lamont as Tony

== Bibliography ==
- Pitts, Michael R. Poverty Row Studios, 1929-1940. McFarland & Company, 2005.
