= The Furies (1930 film) =

1930 film

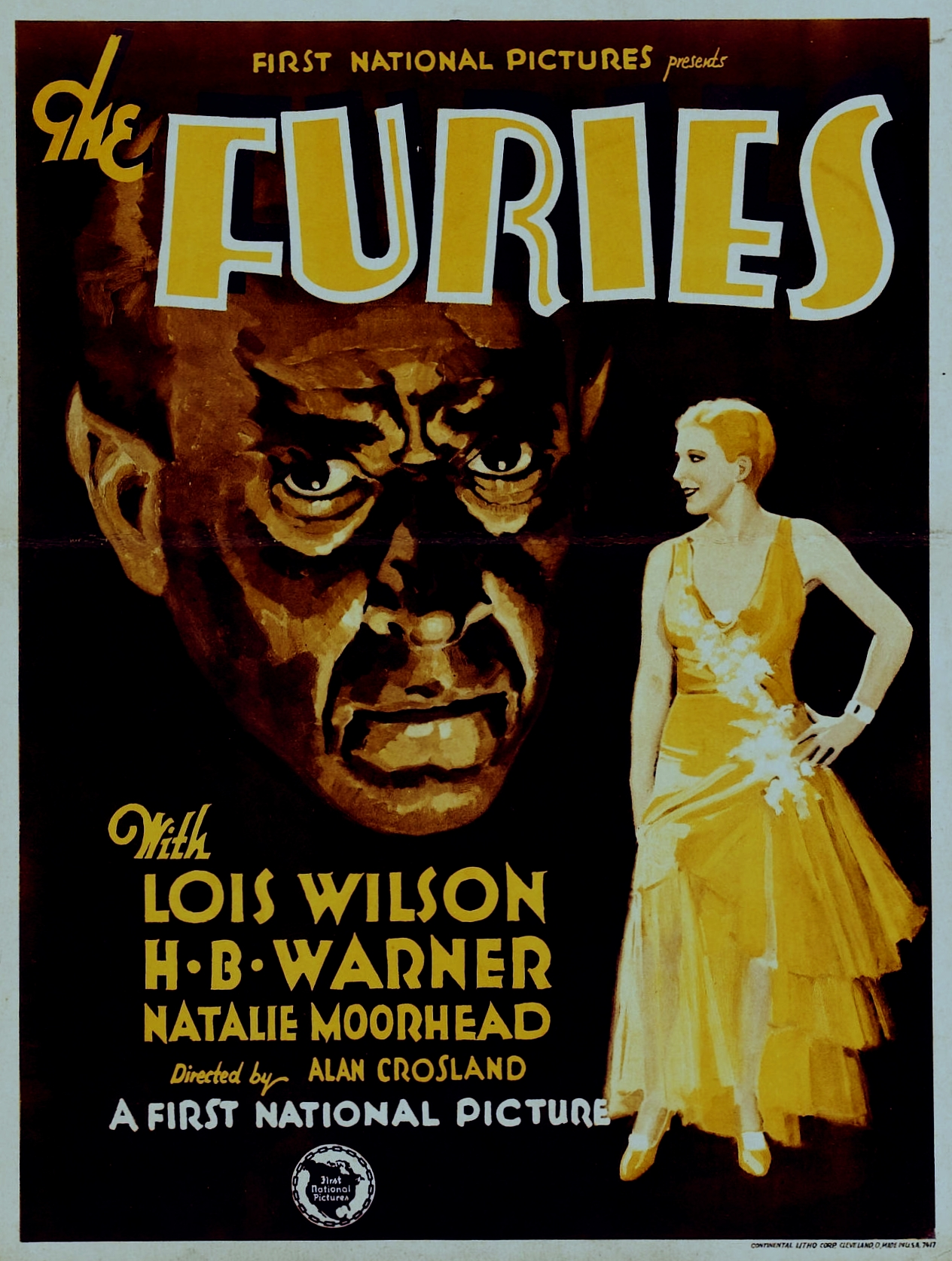
- Theatrical poster
- Directed by: Alan Crosland
- Written by: based on the play by Zoe Akins; Forrest Halsey (screenplay)
- Starring: Lois Wilson; H. B. Warner; Natalie Moorhead; Theodore von Eltz
- Cinematography: Robert Kurrle
- Music by: Sam Perry
- Production company: First National Pictures
- Distributed by: First National Pictures
- Release date: March 16, 1930 (U.S.)
- Running time: 69 minutes
- Country: United States
- Language: English

The Furies is 1930 American all-talking pre-Code murder mystery film released by First National Pictures, a subsidiary of Warner Bros. Pictures, and directed by Alan Crosland. The movie stars Lois Wilson, H. B. Warner, Natalie Moorhead and Theodore von Eltz. The film was based on the 1928 play, of the same name, by Zoe Akins.

== Plot ==
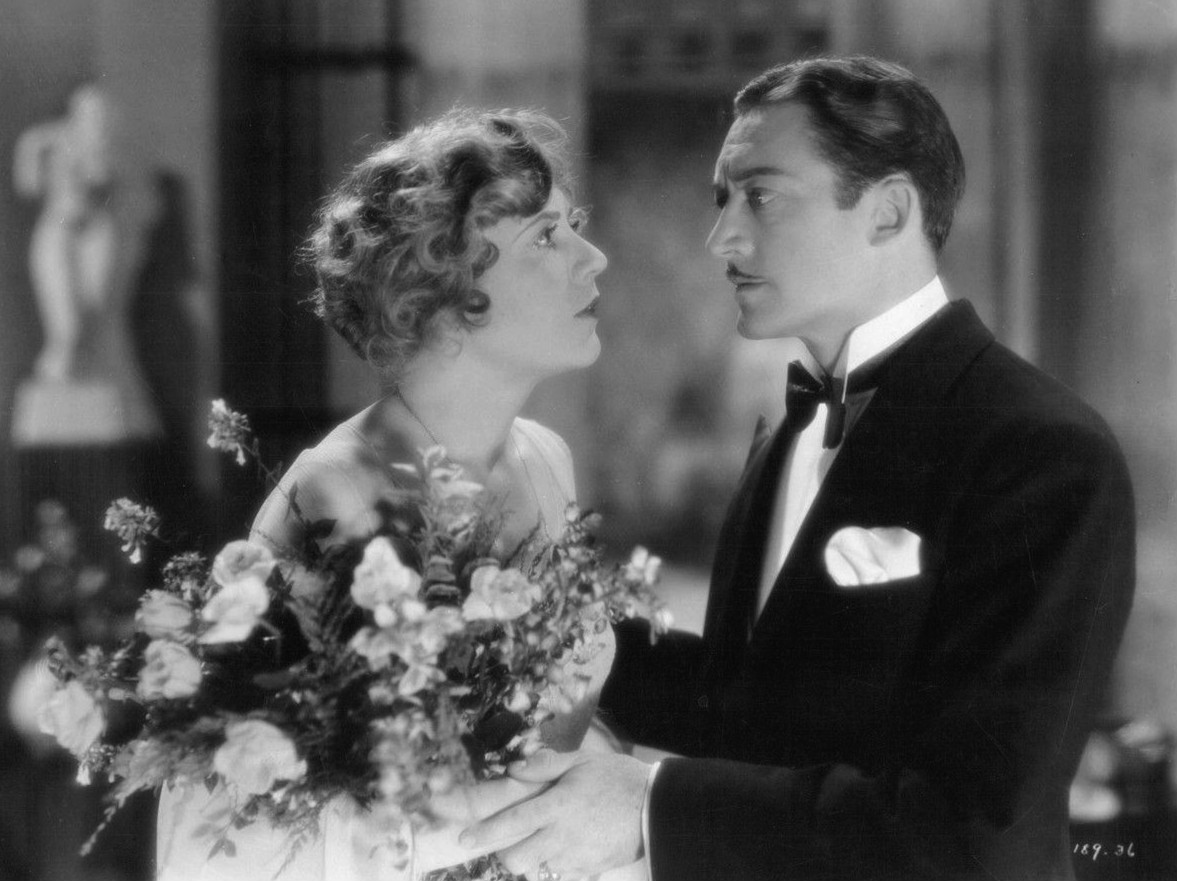
Lois Wilson and Theodore Von Eltz in The Furies

Fifi Sands is married to Mr. Sands, an unpleasant millionaire, who is constantly cheating on her. Being fed up with his affairs, Mrs. Sands, who is in love with Owen McDonald, asks Mr. Sands for a divorce but he constantly refuses. Mr. Sands's lawyer, manages to prevent her from filing for divorce for a while.

One evening, at a dinner party given by Smith, Fifi announces that her husband has finally granted her a divorce. McDonald, however, is disappointed to find that she did not ask for a settlement or alimony. Later, Alan Sands, Fifi's son, discovered that his father had been murdered with poison and accuses McDonald of the deed and chastises his mother for protecting him. Sands' s lawyer accuses McDonald of being a penniless fortune-hunter. This further blackens the case again McDonald. Dr. Cummings, who is the family doctor. is also suspected because of his unusual interest in Fifi.

Fifi is also a suspect because she seems distraught during the dinner party, which occurred on the night that Mr. Sands was murdered. Fifi at first quarrels with Oliver Bedlow and orders him out of her house. Later on she turns to him for help. He at first seem uninterested in helping, but when he discovers that Fifi is not in love with McDonald, he agrees to help her. Bedlow then locks the apartment door and begins to discuss the case. Mrs. Sands's loyal servants are coached in their testimony by Bedlow but they are unable to remember their lines. After an intensive investigation of suspects in the death of Mr. Sands, Bedlow breaks down and confesses to the crime. Bedlow declares his love for Fifi, but is rejected and commits suicide by falling out of a window.

== Cast ==
- Lois Wilson as Fifi Sands
- H. B. Warner as Oliver Bedlow
- Natalie Moorhead as Caroline Leigh
- Theodore von Eltz as Owen McDonald
- Tyler Brooke as Smith
- Purnell Pratt as District Attorney
- Montagu Love as Mr. Sands
- Byron Sage as Alan Sands
- Carl Stockdale as Bennett

== Preservation status ==
No film elements are known to survive. The soundtrack, which was recorded on Vitaphone disks, may survive in private hands.

== See also ==
- List of lost films
