= Eiki =

Japanese projector company

Eiki Industrial Co., Ltd.
- Native name: 映機工業株式会社
- Formerly: Matsuura Yagi Sekino Minagawa (1953-1981)
- Type: Private K.K.
- Industry: Display technology
- Founded: 1953 (as Matsuura Yagi Sekino Minagawa); 1981 (as Eiki Industrial Co., Ltd.)
- Founder: M. Matsuura; S. Yagi; K. Sekino; Y. Minagawa
- Headquarters: Itami, Hyogo, Japan
- Products: LCD and DLP projectors
- Divisions: California, United States; Ontario, Canada; Germany; Czech Republic; Malaysia; Shanghai, China; Australia
- Website: www.eiki.com

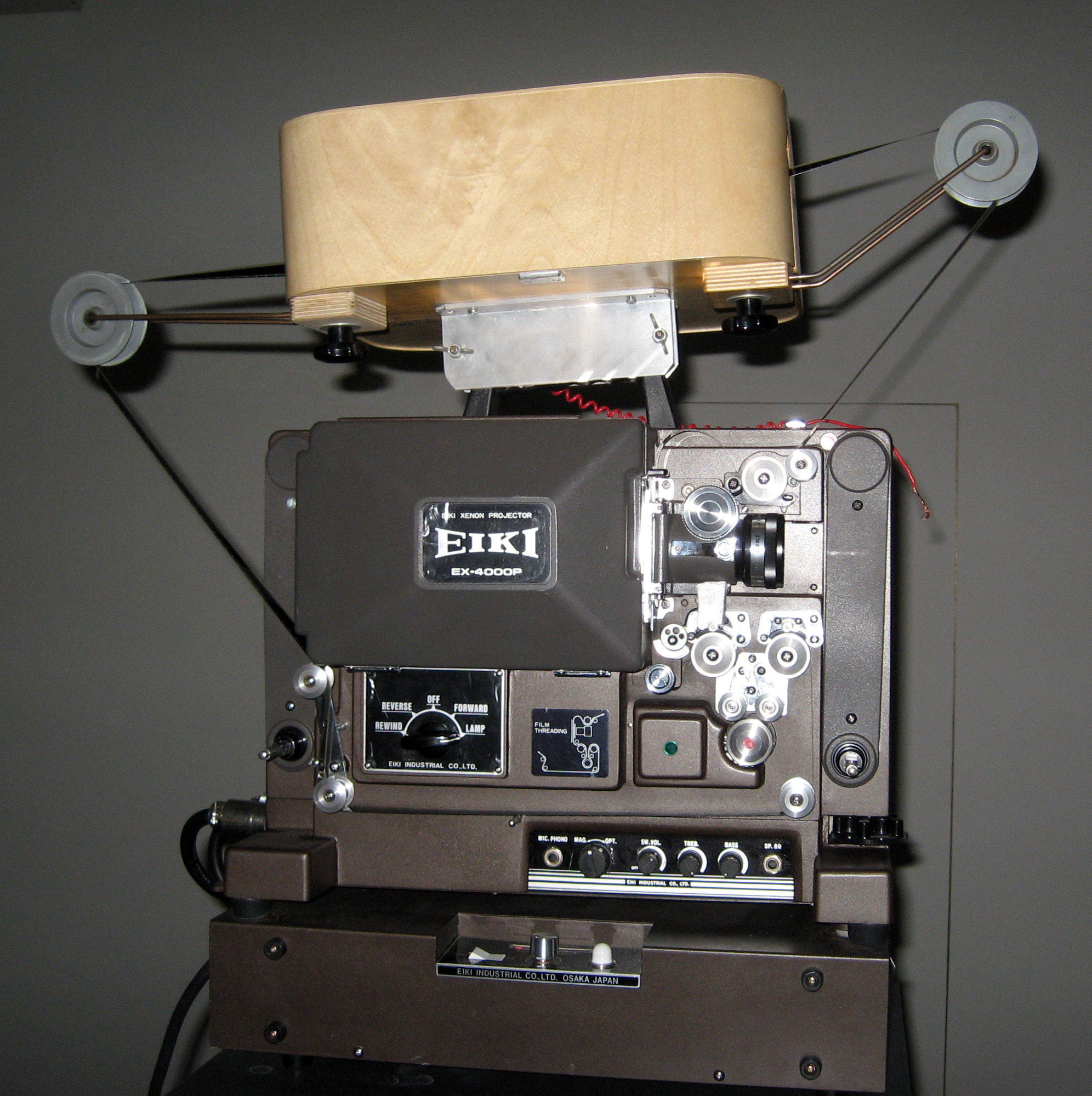
An Eiki EX-4000P movie projector with a filmlooper designed by Studio 2M

Eiki Industrial Co., Ltd. (映機工業株式会社, Eiki Kōgyō Kabushiki-gaisha) (Formerly Matsuura Yagi Sekino Minagawa (松浦八木関野湊川, Matsuura Yagi Sekino Minagawa)) is a Japanese company that manufactures LCD and DLP projectors, related accessories and overhead projectors.

== History ==
Eiki was founded in 1953 in Osaka, Japan by four founders (M. Matsuura, S. Yagi, K. Sekino and Y. Minagawa). Initially the focus of the company was producing technology for classroom instruction but later on the company focused more on producing 16 mm movie projectors for other fields. The name Eiki comes from the Japanese term Eishaki meaning projector.Their 16mm projectors they manufactured went under other names; such as Elf in the UK and Hanimex Eiki in Australia and other countries. In the late 80s, some of their most advanced models went under the Bell and Howell name when they bought the company.

Their most influential model would have been the ST/M which would go on to be the format for their successors, the RT and later NT models.

Eiki 16mm projectors included only half of the moving parts of popular projectors, thus making them less costly and easier to maintain. They were the largest manufacturer of such projectors. Because of their simple nature and easy serviceability, they are the most popular projector among collectors and hobbyists alike. The biggest issue people have with these projectors is that they are driven completely by rubber belts which perish and snap with age. They solved this issue with the introduction of their SL model in the late 70s, but all their later models including this one often fetch high prices.

In 1974, Eiki opened Eiki International, Inc., their USA division in Laguna Niguel, California to distribute its products in the United States. In 1986, the company acquired the business unit of the Bell & Howell company that had originated the audio visual industry some 50 years earlier. In 1988, Eiki Canada was created as a subsidiary of Eiki International, Inc. In 1995, Eiki Deutschland, GmbH became the company's first wholly owned office in Europe. And, in 1997 Eiki Czech was founded to establish a network of dealers across central and eastern Europe.Eiki’s UK headquarters in Slough was bought in 2003.
