= Forgotten (1933 film) =

1933 film

- Directed by: Richard Thorpe
- Written by: Harry Sauber (original story "The Fifth Commandment"); Harry Sauber (adaptation); Harry Sauber (dialogue)
- Produced by: Maury M. Cohen (producer)
- Cinematography: M.A. Anderson
- Distributed by: Chesterfield Pictures
- Release date: 1933
- Running time: 65 minutes
- Country: United States
- Language: English

Forgotten is a 1933 American pre-Code film directed by Richard Thorpe.

== Plot ==
Retired Papa Strauss, a widower, who has been a successful dye manufacturer, is being shifted around from one married son's home to the other, and is not welcome at all because his daughters-in-law object to his smelly pipe smoking. Finally the family tucks him 'out of sight and out of mind' into a nursing home, with very little 'honor thy father' thought given to it.

However, unmarried daughter, Lena, who loves her father dearly— with help from an inheritance from her uncle, and her chemist fiancée, who has new patented technology — sets up a new dye works with her father as head. They make a home for him. The new company steals business from the sons' company and finally the father has to bail them out. The sons and their wives attitudes finally change.

== Cast ==
- Lee Kohlmar as Papa Strauss
- June Clyde as Lena Strauss
- William Collier Jr. as Joseph Meyers
- Leon Ames as Louie Strauss
- Selmer Jackson as Hans Strauss
- Natalie Moorhead as Myrtle Strauss
- Natalie Kingston as May Strauss
- Otto Lederer as Uncle Adolph
- Tom Ricketts as Mr. Johnson
