= Probation (1932 film) =

1932 film

- Directed by: Richard Thorpe
- Written by: Edward T. Lowe
- Produced by: George Batcheller
- Starring: Sally Blane; John Darrow; Clara Kimball Young
- Cinematography: M. A. Anderson
- Edited by: Vera Wade
- Production company: Chesterfield Pictures
- Distributed by: Chesterfield Pictures
- Release date: March 15, 1932
- Running time: 67 minutes
- Country: United States
- Language: English

Probation (also known as Second Chances) is a 1932 American pre-Code film directed by Richard Thorpe and starring Clara Kimball Young and Betty Grable. The film was distributed by the Chesterfield Motion Pictures Corporation. Betty Grable is on the verge of becoming a superstar, in the 1940s.

== Plot ==
Ruth is a minor who is running with an uptown, older man. Ruth's brother, Nick, is unaware of his kid sister's activities. Ruth is turned in to the juvenile authorities by the well-meaning Mrs. Humphries. Nick finds a man in their apartment and proceeds to be arrested for beating up the man, who runs away before Nick is arrested. Nick is taken to night court and remanded to the custody of the judge's niece, Janet, for six months as her chauffeur. Janet is the fiancé of Allen, who is coincidentally the man who was beaten up by Nick.

== Cast ==
- Sally Blane as Janet
- John Darrow as Nick
- J. Farrell MacDonald as Uncle George
- Clara Kimball Young as Mrs. Humphries
- Eddie Phillips as Allen
- David Rollins as Alec
- Matty Kemp as Berl
- David Durand as David
- Betty Grable as Ruth
