= Intimate Relations (1937 film) =

1937 film

- DVD cover
- Directed by: Clayton Hutton
- Written by: Stafford Dickens (play); Frank Atkinson
- Produced by: Herbert Wynne
- Starring: June Clyde; Garry Marsh; Jack Hobbs
- Cinematography: John Stumar
- Music by: Lew Stone
- Production company: Tudor Films
- Distributed by: Associated British Film Distributors
- Release date: 15 November 1937; November 1937
- Running time: 66 minutes
- Country: United Kingdom
- Language: English

Intimate Relations is a 1937 British comedy film directed by Clayton Hutton and starring June Clyde, Garry Marsh and Jack Hobbs. It was written by Frank Atkinson based on the play by Stafford Dickens, and was made as a quota quickie at Highbury Studios.

== Plot ==
To escape the unwelcome advances of his boss George Gommery's wife Jane, timid secretary Freddie Hall claims to be engaged, and randomly points to a photograph of revue star Molly Morrell, claiming her to be his "fiancée." This outrages George, who is secretly chasing Molly himself. When Freddie begs Molly to help him keep up the charade, true romance blossoms between them.

== Cast ==
- June Clyde as Molly Morell
- Garry Marsh as George Gommery
- Jack Hobbs as Freddie Hall
- Vera Bogetti as Jane Gommery
- Cynthia Stock as Maggie
- Moore Marriott as Toomley
- Arthur Finn as Goldfish
- Bruce Winston as Stetson
- Lew Stone and his band as themselves

== Reception ==
The Monthly Film Bulletin wrote: "The story is slight, being mainly the pestering of two reluctant people until they join forces against the aggressors. There is a pantomimic song given by June Clyde and Jack Hobbs and some would-be satire on American film magnates. The acting is good, but the film tends to be episodic and long-drawn out."

Kine Weekly wrote: "Conventional romantic farcical comedy, decorated with unpretentious back-stage and back-studio musical spectacle. In spite of enthusiastic team work on the part of the cast, laughs are not exactly abundant, but the entertainment contains within its self-imposed limits an air of infectious irresponsiblty, and this should get it over in a quota capacity in the smaller halls."
