= Invincible Pictures =

Defunct Australian film production company

Invincible Pictures Trademark

Invincible Pictures was an Australian film production company active from the 1930s through to the early 1980s. It was started by cinematographer Paul Ruckert in Brisbane in the mid-1930s and mainly produced documentaries. The first commercial productions were black-and-white newsreels covering local events, and the first documentary was a colour film entitled Beauty Spots around Brisbane in 1939.

While Invincible Pictures started as a one-man operation, in later years Paul was assisted by his wife Iris Ruckert, who wrote many of the scripts and provided general assistance. Production ceased in 1981, but Paul and Iris continued to screen their educational films in Queensland schools for many years under the auspices of the Queensland Arts Council.

For more detailed information please refer to Australian film producers articles - Paul F Ruckert
