= Fulton Oursler =

American dramatist (1893–1952)

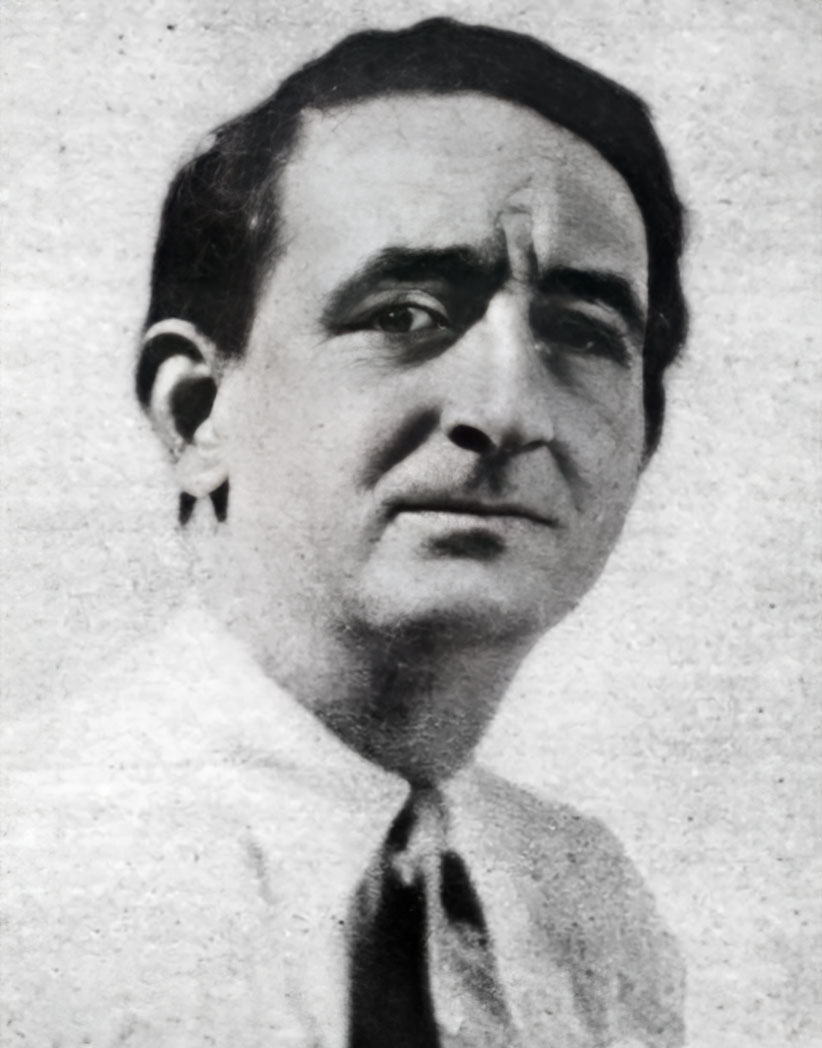
- Born: Charles Fulton Oursler; January 22, 1893; Baltimore, Maryland, United States
- Died: May 24, 1952 (aged 59); New York City, United States
- Other names: Anthony Abbot (pen name), Fulton Oursler Sr.
- Known for: The Greatest Story Ever Told (1949)
- Spouses: Rose Karger (divorced); Grace Perkins
- Children: 4, including Will Oursler

Charles Fulton Oursler Sr. (January 22, 1893 – May 24, 1952) was an American journalist, playwright, editor and writer. Writing as Anthony Abbot, he was an author of mysteries and detective fiction. His son was the journalist and author Will Oursler (1913–1985).

== Background ==
Oursler was born and grew up in Baltimore, Maryland, the son of a poor city transit worker. His childhood passions were reading and stage magic. He was raised in a devout Baptist family, but at 15, he declared himself an agnostic. While still in his teens, he got a reporter's job for the Baltimore American.

== Career ==
Oursler moved to New York City to edit The Music Trades. He freelanced for a variety of publications early on. His short stories appeared in The Black Cat, Detective Story Magazine, The Thrill Book, and especially Mystery Magazine. Many of his stories, such as "The Magician Detective", incorporate magicians and magic into the plots.

In the 1920s, Oursler aided Harry Houdini in his crusade against fraudulent mediumship. He himself crusaded under the pseudonym Samri Frikell. He was the author of the book Spirit Mediums Exposed (1930), which revealed the techniques of fraud mediums.

John Mulholland wrote that Samri Frikell was the pen name of Oursler when he wrote on the subject of magic and spiritualism. He made it by combining the names of two magicians, Samri Baldwin and Wiljalba Frikell.

He was supervising editor of the various magazines and newspapers published by Bernarr Macfadden, from 1921 to 1941. Macfadden urged him to drop the "Charles" from his name. He became editor of Liberty after Macfadden acquired it in 1931. In the fall of 1939, Fulton Oursler, as editor of Liberty, printed a piece in his magazine called "Alcoholics and God," which brought a rush of 800 frantic inquiries into the New York office of Alcoholics Anonymous, as it was to be known.

Oursler left Macfadden Publications shortly after Macfadden was ousted from the company. Oursler's tenure with the company was continuous from 1921 to 1941, except for a brief period following the success of The Spider (1928).

In 1944, he became a senior editor for Reader's Digest (where his son eventually became managing editor).

Oursler wrote a number of novels. These include Sandalwood (1925), Stepchild of the Moon (1926) and The World's Delight (1929). He also wrote detective stories and magazine articles under the pseudonym Anthony Abbot, as well as several plays, the most famous of which was the gimmick-filled The Spider (1928), co-written with Lowell Brentano and later filmed twice, in 1931 and 1945. The great success of the play attracted four plagiarism suits, which were successfully defended by Oursler's private attorney, Arthur Garfield Hays.

=== Thatcher Colt ===
Under the name Anthony Abbott, Oursler wrote several mysteries featuring the detective Thatcher Colt. Unlike most fictional detectives of the period (usually inspectors or amateur sleuths), Colt belongs to the higher echelons of law enforcement, being the commissioner of the New York Police Department. Similarly to S.S. Van Dine's Philo Vance stories, Oursler featured his nom-de-plume Anthony Abbott as a character in the books, serving as Colt's sidekick and in the manner of Dr. Watson, the first-person narrator of the stories.

Three of the Colt mysteries were adapted to film:

- The Night Club Lady (1932) starring Adolphe Menjou
- The Circus Queen Murder (1933) starring Adolphe Menjou
- The Panther's Claw (1942) starring Sidney Blackmer

Colt was the subject of a radio series. He was voiced by actors Richard Gordon and Hanley Stafford.

== Personal life ==
While still in his teens, Oursler married Rose Karger. They had two children. The marriage ended in divorce.

In 1925, Oursler married Grace Perkins, who had been raised Catholic but lapsed in her teens. They had two children, April and Tony. They practiced no religion and did not raise their children in any faith. Perkins, a former actress, was a prodigious contributor to the Macfadden magazines. Several of her novels were made into films.

In 1935, the Oursler family toured the Middle East and spent a week in the Holy Land. On the journey home, Oursler started writing a book titled A Skeptic in the Holy Land. "I started out being very skeptical," he wrote later, "but in the last chapter I almost converted." He assumed that once the book was published, he would forget about religion. However, perceiving the growing threat of Nazism and Communism, he found himself increasingly drawn to Christian ethics. Astounded at how little people knew about the life and teaching of Jesus Christ, he decided that he would write the story of Jesus and "try and make it as interesting as a serial story in a popular magazine." He would call it The Greatest Story Ever Told.

In 1943, Oursler was received into the Catholic Church. The following year, his son converted to the Catholic faith, and his wife returned to her childhood faith a year later. His daughter converted in 1948. The Greatest Story Ever Told was published in 1949. It was followed by The Greatest Book Ever Written in 1951, and The Greatest Faith Ever Known, completed by his daughter, April Oursler Armstrong, and posthumously published in 1953. The film, The Greatest Story Ever Told, based on Oursler's book, was released in 1965.

Oursler also wrote, as Abbot, the Reader's Digest article that was made into the movie Boomerang! (1947). Another book was Father Flanagan of Boy's Town, 1949, the story of Fr. Flanagan's work with young men. The book was co-authored by Fulton's son Will, also a noted writer.

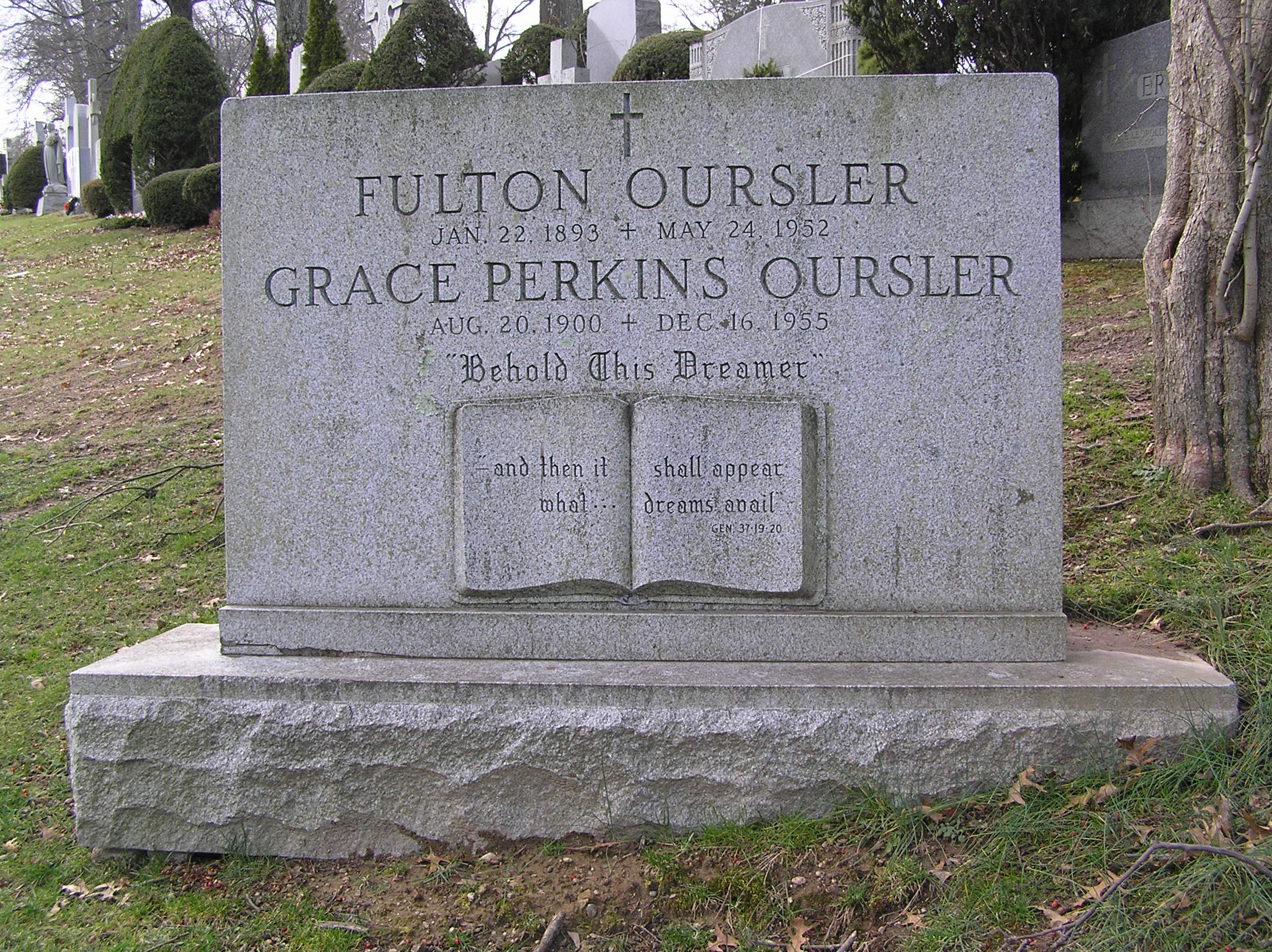
The grave of Fulton Oursler in Gate of Heaven Cemetery

Oursler died in New York City in 1952, while halfway through writing his autobiography. Oursler left his estate to his second wife on the understanding that she would leave the estate to his four children. When she died, she left it only to the two children she had with Oursler and the other two successfully sued for their share.

== Works ==
=== Novels ===
==== As Fulton Oursler ====
- Behold this Dreamer! (1924)
- Sandalwood (1925)
- Stepchild of the Moon (1926)
- Poor Little Fool
- The World's Delight (1929)
- The Great Jasper (1930)
- Joshua Todd (1935)
- A Skeptic In The Holy Land (1936)
- Three Things We Can Believe In
- A History Of Protestant Missions
- The Precious Secret (1947)
- Why I Know There Is A God (1950)
- The Greatest Story Ever Told Series:
  - The Greatest Story Ever Told: A Tale of the Greatest Life Ever Lived. Doubleday. 1949. Reissue: Image Books, 1989, unabridged ISBN 978-0-385-08028-6
  - The Greatest Book Ever Written: The Old Testament Story. Doubleday. 1951.
  - The Greatest Faith Ever Known: The Story of the Men Who First Spread the Religion of Jesus and of the Momentous Times in Which They Lived. Doubleday. 1953.

==== As Anthony Abbot ====
- Thatcher Colt Detective Mystery Series:
  - About the Murder of Geraldine Foster (1930) a.k.a. The Murder of Geraldine Foster
  - About the Murder of the Clergyman's Mistress (1931) a.k.a. The Crime of the Century, The Murder of the Clergyman's Mistress, The Mysterious Murder of the Blonde Play-Girl
  - About the Murder of the Night Club Lady (1931) a.k.a. The Night Club Lady, The Murder of the Night Club Lady
  - About the Murder of the Circus Queen (1932) a.k.a. The Murder of a Circus Queen
  - About the Murder of A Startled Lady (1935) a.k.a. The Murder of a Startled Lady
  - About the Murder of A Man Afraid of Women (1937) a.k.a. The Murder of a Man Afraid of Women
  - The Creeps (1939) a.k.a. Murder at Buzzards Bay
  - The Shudders (1943) a.k.a. Deadly Secret
- The Flower of the Gods (1936, with Achmed Abdullah)
- The Shadow of the Master (1940, with Achmed Abdullah)

==== As Arnold Foutain ====
- Heart's Desire (1929–1930). Novella

==== As Samri Frikell ====
- The Man With Miracle Mind (1921). Novella

=== Short story collections ===
==== As Fulton Oursler ====
- The Magician Detective and Other Weird Mysteries. Off-Trail Publications. 2010.; ISBN 978-1-935031-12-3

==== As Anthony Abbot ====
- These are Strange Tales (1948)

=== Short stories ===
==== As Fulton Oursler ====
- "A String of Blue Beads" (1913)
- "The Man Who Didn't Do It" (1915)
- "Chief Bob Carter, Foe of Gamblers" (1916)
- "The Thousand-Dollar Thumb" (1917)
- "Three Who Were Deformed" (1917)
- "The Sign of the Seven Sharks" (1918)
- "Shadowing the Blue Triangle" (1918)
- "The Magician Detective" (1918)
- "The Evil Eye" (1919)
- "The Mystery of the Seven Shadows" (1919)
- "The Whispering Head" (1920)
- "The Clue of the Red Lamp" (1920)
- "The Hand of Judas" (1920, with John Irving Pearce Jr.)
- "Perkins Cans a Louis Quinze" (1920)
- "The Spirit Bell" (1920)
- "The Jeweled Pipe of Persia" (1920)
- "The Spirit Witness" (1921)
- "Professor Satan" (1921)
- "The Man in Room No. 7" (1921)
- "The Trance Detective" (1921)
- "Counterfeit Clues" (1921)
- "A Man from Siam" (1922)
- "A Whispering Mummy" (1922)
- "The District Attorney's Secret" (1922)
- "Charged with His Own Murder" (1922)
- "The Flying Turk" (1922, with John Irving Pearce Jr.)
- "The Stone Yard of Satan: A Story of Horror" (1922)
- "He Fell in Love with a Ghost" (1922)
- "The Mystery of Ten Mummies" (1922)
- "Fear: the Arch Enemy" (1922)
- "A Master of Millions" (1923)
- "The Hand in the Dark" (1923)
- "Forever and Forever, Amen!" (1923)
- "Go and Sin no More!" (1923)
- "One Clue Missing" (1923)
- "The Kind of Man That Ought to Be Shot" (1923)
- "The Footprints on the Ceiling" (1924)
- "The Thrill Is Gone" (1942, with Rupert Hughes)
- "The Wager" (1944)

==== As Anthony Abbot ====
- "The Mystery of Geraldine" (1931)
- "The Perfumed Trail" (1932)
- "Shivering in the Dark" (1932)
- "Ghost Girl" (1932)
- "The President's Mystery Story" (1935)
- Thatcher Colt Detective Mystery Series:
  - "About the Disappearance of Agatha King" (1939)
  - "About the Perfect Crime of Mr. Digberry" (1940)
- "The Perfect Case" (1945)
- "The Face From Beyond" (1946)
- "The Girl Who Plotted Her Own Murder" (1948)
- "The Ship of Sleepless Men" (1958)

==== As Arnold Foutain ====
- "The Physical Culture Detective" (1926)
- "The Burglar Girl" (1928)

==== As Samri Frikell ====
- "The House of Whispering Shadows" (1922)
- "The Mystery of the Spirit Portrait" (1923)
- "The Strangest Woman in the World" (1923)
- "The Mystery of the Flying Dagger" (1926)

=== Plays ===
- Sandalwood (Original, Play, Drama) September 22 - October 1926
- The Spider (Original, Play, Mystery, Melodrama) March 22 - December 1927
- Behold This Dreamer (Original, Play, Drama) October 31 - December 1927
- The Spider (Revival, Play, Melodrama, Mystery) February 27 - March 1928
- All the King's Men (Original, Play, Comedy, Drama) February 4 – March 4, 1929
- The Walking Gentleman (Original, Play) May 7–12, 1942

=== Nonfiction ===
==== Articles ====
- "Class Loyalty and Its Part in Success" (1923)
- "Is Hollywood More Sinned Against than Sinning?" (1932)
- "I Am Looking for a Writer" (1934)
- "Strange Stories that Jafsie Told" (1936)
- "Could Landon Keep Us Out of War?" (1936)
- "China's Strong Woman Talks" (1937)
- "Women and Children First" (1937)
- "'I Want Only Peace! I Am Not a Dictator!' Says Mussolini" (1938)
- "Police and Press: An Invincible Partnership" (1939)
- "Inked Out" (1939)
- "The Lady Suggested Sabotage" (1940)
- "The Duke of Winsdor Talks of War and Peace" (1941)
- "Winston Churchill Writes About the U-Boat Menace" (1941)
- "Should the Detective Story Writer Know Anything About Crime?" (as Anthony Abbot) (1945)
- "Whose Business Was It?" (1948)
- "The Mistake" (1950)
- "Why the Sun Stood Still" (1950)
- Lights Along the Shore. Hanover House. 1955.. Collection of 41 stories and articles

==== Others ====
- Spirit Mediums Exposed. New York: Macfadden Publications. 1930.
- A Skeptic in the Holy Land. Farrar & Rinehart. 1936.
- The Precious Secret. John C. Winston. 1947.
- Father Flanagan of Boys Town. Doubleday. 1949. (with Will Oursler). Biography
- The Happy Grotto. Declan X. McMullen. 1949.
- Why I Know There Is a God. Doubleday. 1950.
- Modern Parables (1950)
- A Child Life of Jesus (1951)
- Behold this dreamer!: An autobiography. Little, Brown. 1964. Autobiography

== See also ==
- The Greatest Story Ever Told (radio program)
