= Panther's Claw =

Panther's Claw may refer to:

- The Panther's Claw, a 1942 American film directed by William Beaudine
- Operation Panther's Claw, a United Kingdom-led military operation of the War in Afghanistan in Helmand Province in southern Afghanistan
