= Samri Baldwin =

American magician (1848–1924)

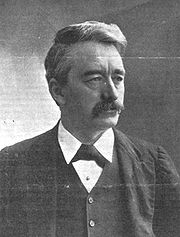
- Baldwin in an 1895 publication
- Born: Samuel Spencer Baldwin; January 21, 1848; Cincinnati, Ohio
- Died: March 13, 1924 (aged 76); San Francisco, California
- Resting place: San Francisco National Cemetery
- Occupation: Magician

Samuel Spencer Baldwin (January 21, 1848 – March 13, 1924), or Samri Baldwin, best known as "The White Mahatma" was an American magician.

== Biography ==
Baldwin was born in Cincinnati, Ohio. He became interested in magic whilst watching the Davenport brothers perform séances. He began to duplicate the tricks of fraudulent mediums such as Anna Eva Fay. He was the first to take the "question and answer" mentalism act to the stage.

Baldwin exposed the tricks of fraudulent mediums and claimed to have learned the tricks of the fakirs of India. He was married to the stage mentalist Kitty (1853-1934) would assist him in his performances, they had one daughter Shadow.

The magician Fulton Oursler when writing on the subject of magic and spiritualism, used the name Samri Frikell. He made it by combining the names of Samri Baldwin and another magician, Wiljalba Frikell.

Baldwin was one of the first magicians to have practiced a stage escape from handcuffs. He had performed this feat as early as 1871. Early in his career the magician Harry Houdini demonstrated a handcuff escape at the Alhambra Theatre. The manager C. Dundas Slater noted that Baldwin had performed the trick many years before Houdini.

Magician Joseph Rinn noted that Baldwin in his day was believed to possess psychic powers but this view was erroneous because "he never pretended to be anything but an entertainer."

Baldwin died at his home in San Francisco on March 13, 1924.

== Publications ==
- The Secrets of Mahatma Land Explained (1895)
- Spirit Mediums Exposed (1879)

== Quotes ==
I have attended at least two thousand spiritual séances, and I am more convinced now even than I was in my earlier days, that under no circumstances do disembodied spirits return to this world to produce manifestations of any character. Samri Baldwin (1895) The Secrets of Mahatma Land Explained
