= Frank Darien =

American actor (1876–1955)

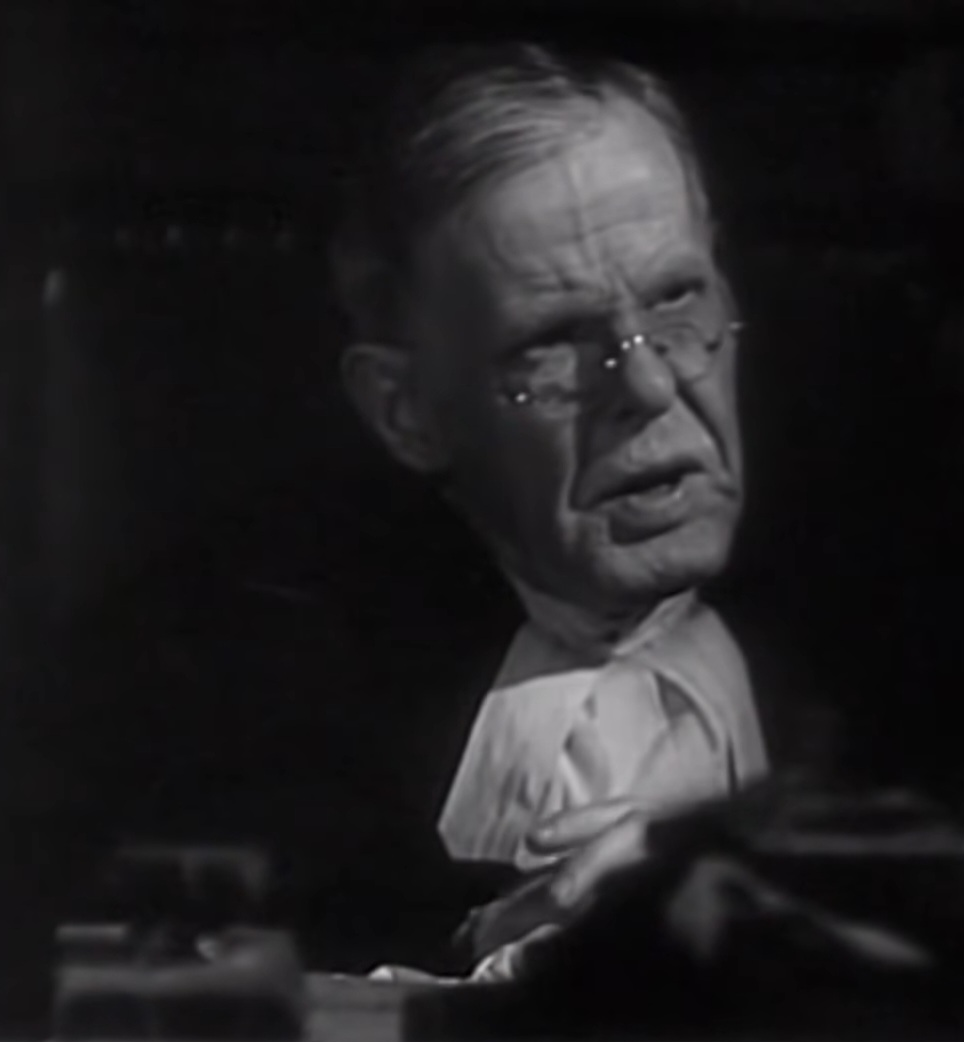
- Darien in Bluebeard (1944)
- Born: Frank Guderian; March 18, 1876; New Orleans, Louisiana, U.S.
- Died: October 20, 1955 (aged 79); Hollywood, California, U.S.
- Occupation: Actor
- Years active: 1915-1951

Frank Darien (born Frank Guderian; March 18, 1876 – October 20, 1955) was an American actor. He appeared in 225 films between 1915 and 1951.

== Filmography ==
| Year | Title | Role | Notes |
|---|---|---|---|
| 1915 | Ethel's Romance | Minor Role | Film debut |
| 1926 | Old Ironsides | Seaman | Uncredited |
| 1931 | Cimarron | Mr. Bixby | Uncredited |
| 1931 | June Moon | Window Cleaner | |
| 1931 | The She-Wolf | Remington's Associate | Uncredited |
| 1931 | Everything's Rosie | Sam Hall | Uncredited |
| 1931 | Big Business Girl | Luke Winters | |
| 1931 | I Take This Woman | Station Agent | |
| 1931 | The Public Defender | The Waiter | Uncredited |
| 1931 | Bad Girl | Lathrop | Uncredited |
| 1931 | Five Star Final | Schwartz - Undertaker | Uncredited |
| 1931 | The Tip-Off | Edna's Uncle | Uncredited |
| 1931 | Way Back Home | Station Master | Uncredited |
| 1931 | Her Majesty, Love | Factory Clerk | Uncredited |
| 1931 | Peach-O-Reno | Counselor Jackson #3 | Uncredited |
| 1931 | The Big Shot | Herb, the Postmaster | Uncredited |
| 1932 | Union Depot | Doctor / Little Boy's Father | Uncredited |
| 1932 | High Pressure | Oscar Brown - Realty Agent | Uncredited |
| 1932 | Business and Pleasure | American Tourist | Uncredited |
| 1932 | Are You Listening? | Desk Clerk | Uncredited |
| 1932 | The Miracle Man | Hiram Higgins | |
| 1932 | The Rider of Death Valley | Elmer - Assayer | Uncredited |
| 1932 | Sinners in the Sun | Garage Mechanic | Uncredited |
| 1932 | Lady and Gent | Jim | |
| 1932 | The Night Club Lady | Dr. Magnus | Uncredited |
| 1932 | Life Begins | Harry | Uncredited |
| 1932 | Okay, America! | O'Toole | Uncredited |
| 1932 | Prosperity | Erza Higgins | |
| 1933 | The Billion Dollar Scandal | Typesetter | Uncredited |
| 1933 | Mystery of the Wax Museum | Autopsy Surgeon | Uncredited |
| 1933 | Hello, Everybody! | Henry Thompson | |
| 1933 | Grand Slam | Bridge Match Kibitzer | Uncredited |
| 1933 | Song of the Eagle | Mailman | Uncredited |
| 1933 | The Story of Temple Drake | Gas Station Manager | Uncredited |
| 1933 | Lilly Turner | Hotel Porter | Uncredited |
| 1933 | Professional Sweetheart | Winston Appleby | |
| 1933 | Heroes for Sale | Announcer at Roger's Reception | Uncredited |
| 1933 | Baby Face | Paris Bank Agent | Uncredited |
| 1933 | No Marriage Ties | Deane Co. Chemist | Uncredited |
| 1933 | This Day and Age | Stolen Car Owner | |
| 1933 | Bureau of Missing Persons | Man Identifying Daughter's Photo | Uncredited |
| 1933 | Big Executive | Richardson' Secretary | |
| 1933 | Female | Ed - the Comptroller | Uncredited |
| 1933 | From Headquarters | Lawyer Manley | Uncredited |
| 1933 | Jimmy and Sally | Marlowe Associate | Uncredited |
| 1933 | The House on 56th Street | Justice of the Peace | Uncredited |
| 1934 | Fashions of 1934 | Jules | |
| 1934 | Journal of a Crime | Stage Manager | |
| 1934 | Sing and Like It | Mr. Fripp - Pianist | Uncredited |
| 1934 | Smarty | Court Spectator | Uncredited |
| 1934 | Let's Try Again | David - Jack's Tailor | Uncredited |
| 1934 | His Greatest Gamble | Dinner Guest | Uncredited |
| 1934 | Service With a Smile | Customer | early Technicolor short |
| 1934 | Dames | First Druggist | Uncredited |
| 1934 | Marie Galante | Ellsworth | |
| 1934 | The Firebird | Franz - the Pointers' Butler | Uncredited |
| 1934 | Men of the Night | Mr. Webbley | Uncredited |
| 1934 | Anne of Green Gables | Angus - Station Master | Uncredited |
| 1934 | The Gay Bride | Mr. Bartlett | Uncredited |
| 1934 | The Secret Bride | Justice of the Peace | Uncredited |
| 1935 | Behind the Evidence | Herbert | |
| 1935 | The Little Colonel | Nebler | |
| 1935 | The Perfect Clue | Stationmaster | |
| 1935 | Life Begins at 40 | Abercrombie's Friend | Uncredited |
| 1935 | Public Hero No. 1 | Dr. Hale - Plastic Surgeon | Uncredited |
| 1935 | Mad Love | Lavin - Waxworks Proprietor | Uncredited |
| 1935 | Here Comes the Band | Pawnbroker | Uncredited |
| 1935 | Here Comes Cookie | Clyde | |
| 1935 | Charlie Chan in Shanghai | Bespectacled Tourist in Versailles Cafe | Uncredited |
| 1935 | Dr. Socrates | Sam - a Druggist | Uncredited |
| 1935 | Thanks a Million | Politician | Uncredited |
| 1936 | Riffraff | Smoky - Night Watchman | Uncredited |
| 1936 | The Story of Louis Pasteur | Academy Member | Uncredited |
| 1936 | The Walking Dead | Cemetery Caretaker | Uncredited |
| 1936 | Sutter's Gold | Missouri Trader | Uncredited |
| 1936 | Brides Are Like That | Clem Brown | |
| 1936 | The Moon's Our Home | Night Clerk | Uncredited |
| 1936 | Captain January | Ira J. Slocum - Storekeeper | Uncredited |
| 1936 | Trouble for Two | Ambassador's Aide | Uncredited |
| 1936 | Early to Bed | Pop - a Clerk | Uncredited |
| 1936 | Parole! | Patton's Assistant | Uncredited |
| 1936 | Satan Met a Lady | Hotel Clerk | Uncredited |
| 1936 | Undercover Man | Dizzy Slocum | |
| 1936 | Wedding Present | Cashier | Uncredited |
| 1936 | Polo Joe | Baggage Man | Uncredited |
| 1936 | Easy to Take | Drug Store Clerk | Uncredited |
| 1936 | Pennies from Heaven | Chicken Farmer | Uncredited |
| 1937 | On the Avenue | Frank - Stage Doorman | Uncredited |
| 1937 | Time Out for Romance | Telegraph Operator | Uncredited |
| 1937 | Fair Warning | Hotel Doctor | Uncredited |
| 1937 | 23 1/2 Hours' Leave | Elevator Operator | Uncredited |
| 1937 | Jim Hanvey, Detective | Pete | |
| 1937 | The Good Old Soak | Jasper | Uncredited |
| 1937 | Wake Up and Live | Hay Wagon Driver | Uncredited |
| 1937 | The Toast of New York | Member of the Board of Directors | Uncredited |
| 1937 | The Life of Emile Zola | Albert | Uncredited |
| 1937 | That Certain Woman | Night Porter | Uncredited |
| 1937 | Trapped by G-Men | Dad Higbee | |
| 1937 | Wine, Women and Horses | Mr. Schultz | Uncredited |
| 1937 | Big Town Girl | Farmer | Uncredited |
| 1938 | The Old Barn Dance | Dawson | Uncredited |
| 1938 | The Adventures of Tom Sawyer | Storekeeper | Uncredited |
| 1938 | Born to Be Wild | Farmer | Uncredited |
| 1938 | Cassidy of Bar 20 | Pappy | |
| 1938 | Jezebel | Bookkeeper | Uncredited |
| 1938 | Prison Break | Cappy | |
| 1938 | Love Finds Andy Hardy | Bill Collector | |
| 1938 | Valley of the Giants | Doctor | Uncredited |
| 1938 | Western Jamboree | Dad Haskell | |
| 1938 | Up the River | Mr. White | Uncredited |
| 1939 | Stand Up and Fight | Mr. Daniels, Cumberland Hotel | Uncredited |
| 1939 | Long Shot | Zeb Jenkins | |
| 1939 | The Adventures of Huckleberry Finn | Old Jailer | Uncredited |
| 1939 | Three Smart Girls Grow Up | Freddie | Uncredited |
| 1939 | Panama Patrol | Sam, the Watchman | |
| 1939 | Dark Victory | Anxious Little Man | Uncredited |
| 1939 | Unexpected Father | Justice of the Peace | Uncredited |
| 1939 | Maisie | Pops | Uncredited |
| 1939 | Career | Cap | Uncredited |
| 1939 | When Tomorrow Comes | Boathouse Caretaker | Uncredited |
| 1939 | Blackmail | Ramey's Oil-Well Watchman | Uncredited |
| 1939 | Babes in Arms | Mr. Parks - Druggist | Uncredited |
| 1939 | Here I Am a Stranger | Western Union Messenger | Uncredited |
| 1939 | Sabotage | Smitty | |
| 1939 | At the Circus | Telegrapher | Uncredited |
| 1939 | Two Thoroughbreds | Mr. Beal - the Mailman | |
| 1940 | The Grapes of Wrath | Uncle John | |
| 1940 | Viva Cisco Kid | Express Agent | Uncredited |
| 1940 | Lillian Russell | Coachman | |
| 1940 | The Way of All Flesh | Second Director | Uncredited |
| 1940 | Anne of Windy Poplars | | Uncredited |
| 1940 | Pier 13 | Hard of Hearing Driver | Uncredited |
| 1940 | Arizona | Joe | |
| 1940 | Blame It on Love | Pop | |
| 1941 | Arkansas Judge | Henry Marsden | |
| 1941 | Adam Had Four Sons | Horace | Uncredited |
| 1941 | Sis Hopkins | Jud | |
| 1941 | Out of the Fog | Joe, Newspaper Vendor | Uncredited |
| 1941 | Puddin' Head | Rube | Uncredited |
| 1941 | Blossoms in the Dust | Jones, Gladney's Accountant | Uncredited |
| 1941 | Hurricane Smith | 'Pop' Wessell | |
| 1941 | Wide Open Town | Pop | Uncredited |
| 1941 | Under Fiesta Stars | Benjamin Peabody | |
| 1941 | Flying Blind | Justice | Uncredited |
| 1941 | Lady Be Good | Justice of the Peace | Uncredited |
| 1941 | King of the Texas Rangers | Pop Evans | Serial, (Chs 1, 8) |
| 1941 | Appointment for Love | Station Agent | Uncredited |
| 1941 | Unholy Partners | Elevator | Uncredited |
| 1941 | Bedtime Story | Minor Role | Uncredited |
| 1941 | Hellzapoppin' | Man calling for Mrs. Jones | |
| 1942 | Roxie Hart | Michael Finnegan | Uncredited |
| 1942 | The Panther's Claw | Samuel Wilkins | |
| 1942 | Meet the Stewarts | Henry - Club Waiter | Uncredited |
| 1942 | Syncopation | Court Bailiff | Uncredited |
| 1942 | Jackass Mail | Postmaster | Uncredited |
| 1942 | The Gay Sisters | Frederick Clausson Simmons | Uncredited |
| 1942 | Tales of Manhattan | Elsa's Old Father | (Laughton sequence), Uncredited |
| 1942 | Get Hep to Love | Constable | Uncredited |
| 1942 | The Mummy's Tomb | Old Townsman | Uncredited |
| 1942 | When Johnny Comes Marching Home | Civil War Veteran | Uncredited |
| 1943 | Hello, Frisco, Hello | Missionary | |
| 1943 | Nobody's Darling | Gardener | Uncredited |
| 1943 | Johnny Come Lately | Vagrant | Uncredited |
| 1943 | The Gang's All Here | Stage Doorman | Uncredited |
| 1944 | None Shall Escape | Old Man | Uncredited |
| 1944 | Rationing | Joady Peckham | Uncredited |
| 1944 | The Adventures of Mark Twain | Toy Store Proprietor | Uncredited |
| 1944 | Andy Hardy's Blonde Trouble | Joe's Place Watchman | Uncredited |
| 1944 | Home in Indiana | Man Seated Right of Ed in Bar | Uncredited |
| 1944 | Tall in the Saddle | Train Station Master | Uncredited |
| 1944 | Bowery to Broadway | Hot Dog Vendor | Uncredited |
| 1944 | Bluebeard | Inquiry Judge | Uncredited |
| 1944 | Nothing but Trouble | Old Man | Uncredited |
| 1944 | Music for Millions | Old Western Union Messenger | Uncredited |
| 1944 | Can't Help Singing | Elderly Wagon Owner | Uncredited |
| 1944 | Gentle Annie | Jake | |
| 1945 | Roughly Speaking | Timekeeper | Uncredited |
| 1945 | The Clock | Customer | Uncredited |
| 1945 | Counter-Attack | Partisan | Uncredited |
| 1945 | Tarzan and the Amazons | Dinghy Skipper | Uncredited |
| 1945 | The Great John L. | Sullivan-Corbett Fight Spectator | Uncredited |
| 1945 | Anchors Aweigh | Hollywood Bowl Janitor | Uncredited |
| 1945 | Kiss and Tell | Elmer K. Waldo | Uncredited |
| 1946 | My Reputation | Elevator Operator | Uncredited |
| 1946 | Claudia and David | Charlie | Uncredited |
| 1946 | Partners in Time | Townsman | Uncredited |
| 1946 | A Stolen Life | Elevator Operator | Uncredited |
| 1946 | Bad Bascomb | Elder Moab McCabe | |
| 1946 | Smoky | Junk Yard Owner | Uncredited |
| 1946 | Gallant Journey | Doctor | Uncredited |
| 1946 | The Fabulous Suzanne | Mr. Tuttle | |
| 1946 | The Secret Heart | Mr. Wiggins | Uncredited |
| 1947 | Beat the Band | Mr. Davis | Uncredited |
| 1947 | The Sea of Grass | Minister | Uncredited |
| 1947 | A Likely Story | Messenger | Uncredited |
| 1947 | That's My Man | Old Hotel Clerk | Uncredited |
| 1947 | The Woman on the Beach | Lars | |
| 1947 | The Trouble with Women | Tony, Elevator Operator | Uncredited |
| 1947 | Down to Earth | Janitor | Uncredited |
| 1947 | Magic Town | Quincy | |
| 1947 | Merton of the Movies | Mr. Hubank | Uncredited |
| 1947 | High Wall | Old Patient in Tub | Uncredited |
| 1948 | Mr. Blandings Builds His Dream House | Judge Quarles | Uncredited |
| 1948 | You Gotta Stay Happy | Old Man | Uncredited |
| 1948 | Belle Starr's Daughter | Old Man | |
| 1948 | An Act of Murder | Old Man Outside Courthouse | Uncredited |
| 1949 | The Accused | Jerry | Uncredited |
| 1949 | Alias Nick Beal | Assistant Tailor | Uncredited |
| 1949 | Little Women | Old Crony at Grace's Store | Uncredited |
| 1949 | Dear Wife | Bailiff | Uncredited |
| 1950 | The Flying Saucer | Matt Mitchell | |
| 1950 | The Yellow Cab Man | Irate Old Man Cab Passenger | Uncredited |
| 1950 | Please Believe Me | Pete Drago | Uncredited |
| 1950 | Shadow on the Wall | Law Librarian | Uncredited |
| 1951 | The Whip Hand | Luther Adams | |
