= 17-animal inheritance puzzle =

Mathematical puzzle

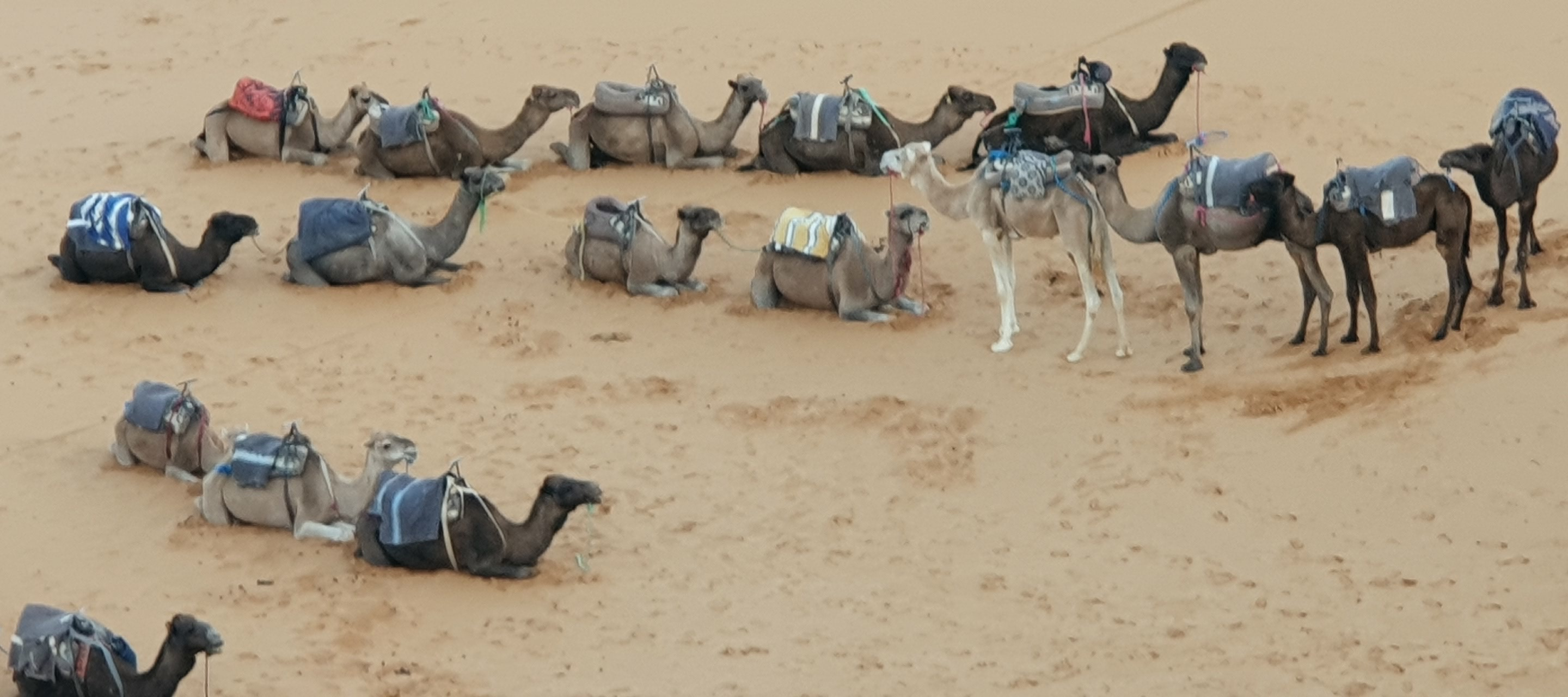
17 indivisible camels

The 17-animal inheritance puzzle is a mathematical puzzle involving unequal but fair allocation of indivisible goods, usually stated in terms of inheritance of a number of large animals (17 camels, 17 horses, 17 elephants, etc.) which must be divided in some stated proportion among a number of beneficiaries. It is a common example of an apportionment problem.

Despite often being framed as a puzzle, it is more an anecdote about a curious calculation than a problem with a clear mathematical solution. Beyond recreational mathematics and mathematics education, the story has been repeated as a parable with varied metaphorical meanings.

Although an ancient origin for the puzzle has often been claimed, it has not been documented. Instead, a version of the puzzle can be traced back to the works of Mulla Muhammad Mahdi Naraqi, an 18th-century Iranian philosopher. It entered the western recreational mathematics literature in the late 19th century. Several mathematicians have formulated different generalizations of the puzzle to numbers other than 17.

== Statement ==
According to the statement of the puzzle, a man dies leaving 17 camels (or other animals) to his three sons, to be divided in the following proportions: the eldest son should inherit 1/2 of the man's property, the middle son should inherit 1/3, and the youngest son should inherit 1/9. How should they divide the camels, noting that only a whole live camel has value?

== Solution ==
Solution to the 17-animal inheritance puzzle

As usually stated, to solve the puzzle, the three sons ask for the help of another man, often a priest, judge, or other local official. This man solves the puzzle in the following way: he lends the three sons his own camel, so that there are now 18 camels to be divided. That leaves nine camels for the eldest son, six camels for the middle son, and two camels for the youngest son, in the proportions demanded for the inheritance. These 17 camels leave one camel left over, which the judge takes back as his own. This is possible as the sum of the fractions is less than one: 1/2 + 1/3 + 1/9 = 17/18.

Some sources point out an additional feature of this solution: each son is satisfied, because he receives more camels than his originally-stated inheritance. The eldest son was originally promised only 8 1/2 camels, but receives nine; the middle son was promised 5 2/3, but receives six; and the youngest was promised 1 8/9, but receives two.

== History ==
Similar problems of unequal division go back to ancient times, but without the twist of the loan and return of the extra camel. For instance, the Rhind Mathematical Papyrus features a problem in which many loaves of bread are to be divided in four different specified proportions. The 17 animals puzzle can be seen as an example of a "completion to unity" problem, of a type found in other examples on this papyrus, in which a set of fractions adding to less than one should be completed, by adding more fractions, to make their total come out to exactly one. Another similar case, involving fractional inheritance in the Roman empire, appears in the writings of Publius Juventius Celsus, attributed to a case decided by Salvius Julianus. The problems of fairly subdividing indivisible elements into specified proportions, seen in these inheritance problems, also arise when allocating seats in electoral systems based on proportional representation.

Many similar problems of division into fractions are known from mathematics in the medieval Islamic world, but "it does not seem that the story of the 17 camels is part of classical Arab-Islamic mathematics". Supposed origins of the problem in the works of al-Khwarizmi, Fibonacci or Tartaglia also cannot be verified. A "legendary tale" attributes it to 16th-century Mughal Empire minister Birbal. The earliest documented appearance of the puzzle found by Pierre Ageron, using 17 camels, appears in the work of 18th-century Shiite Iranian philosopher Mulla Muhammad Mahdi Naraqi. By 1850 it had already entered circulation in America, through a travelogue of Mesopotamia published by James Phillips Fletcher. It appeared in The Mathematical Monthly in 1859, and a version with 17 elephants and a claimed Chinese origin was included in Hanky Panky: A Book of Conjuring Tricks (London, 1872), edited by William Henry Cremer but often attributed to Wiljalba Frikell or Henry Llewellyn Williams. The same puzzle subsequently appeared in the late 19th and early 20th centuries in the works of Henry Dudeney, Sam Loyd, Édouard Lucas, Professor Hoffmann, and Émile Fourrey, among others. A version with 17 horses circulated as folklore in mid-20th-century America.

A variant of the story has been told with 11 camels, to be divided into 1/2, 1/4, and 1/6. Another variant of the puzzle appears in the book The Man Who Counted, a mathematical puzzle book originally published in Portuguese by Júlio César de Mello e Souza in 1938. This version starts with 35 camels, to be divided in the same proportions as in the 17-camel version. After the hero of the story lends a camel, and the 36 camels are divided among the three brothers, two are left over: one to be returned to the hero, and another given to him as a reward for his cleverness. The endnotes to the English translation of the book cite the 17-camel version of the problem to the works of Fourrey and Gaston Boucheny (1939).

Beyond recreational mathematics, the story has been used as the basis for school mathematics lessons, as a parable with varied morals in religion, law, economics, and politics, and even as a lay-explanation for catalysis in chemistry.

== Generalizations ==
Paul Stockmeyer, a computer scientist, defines a class of similar puzzles for any number $n$ of animals, with the property that $n$ can be written as a sum of distinct divisors $d_1, d_2, \dots$ of $n+1$. In this case, one obtains a puzzle in which the fractions into which the $n$ animals should be divided are
$$\frac{d_1}{n+1}, \frac{d_2}{n+1}, \dots .$$
Because the numbers $d_i$ have been chosen to divide $n+1$, all of these fractions simplify to unit fractions. When combined with the judge's share of the animals, $1/(n+1)$, they produce an Egyptian fraction representation of the number one.

The numbers of camels that can be used as the basis for such a puzzle (that is, numbers $n$ that can be represented as sums of distinct divisors of $n+1$) form the integer sequence

1, 3, 5, 7, 11, 15, 17, 19, 23, 27, 29, 31, 35, 39, 41, ...

S. Naranan, an Indian physicist, seeks a more restricted class of generalized puzzles, with only three terms, and with $n+1$ equal to the least common multiple of the denominators of the three unit fractions, finding only seven possible triples of fractions that meet these conditions.

Brazilian researchers Márcio Luís Ferreira Nascimento and Luiz Barco generalize the problem further, as in the variation with 35 camels, to instances in which more than one camel may be lent and the number returned may be larger than the number lent.

== See also ==
- The monkey and the coconuts, a more complicated fair-division puzzle
