= Orchids to You =

1935 film by William A. Seiter

- Directed by: William A. Seiter
- Written by: Bartlett Cormack; Robert Dillon; Howard Estabrook; William Hurlbut; Gordon Rigby; Glenn Tryon
- Produced by: Robert Kane
- Starring: John Boles; Jean Muir; Charles Butterworth
- Cinematography: Merritt B. Gerstad
- Music by: David Buttolph; Hugo Friedhofer; Arthur Lange
- Production company: Fox Film Corporation
- Distributed by: 20th Century-Fox
- Release date: August 10, 1935
- Running time: 74 minutes
- Country: United States
- Language: English

Orchids to You is a 1935 American drama film directed by William A. Seiter and starring John Boles, Jean Muir and Charles Butterworth.

== Plot ==
A flower shop owner and a married attorney begin a romance after meeting in court.

== Partial cast ==
- John Boles as Thomas Bentley
- Jean Muir as Camellia Rand
- Charles Butterworth as Teddy Stuyvesant
- Ruthelma Stevens as Evelyn Bentley
- Harvey Stephens as George Draper
- Arthur Lake as Joe
- Spring Byington as Alice Draper
- Sidney Toler as Nick Corsini
- John Qualen as Smith
- Patricia Farr as Polly
- Arthur Treacher as Roger Morton

== Bibliography ==
- Solomon, Aubrey. The Fox Film Corporation, 1915-1935: A History and Filmography. McFarland, 2011.
