= In the Money (1933 film) =

1933 film directed by Frank R. Strayer

- Directed by: Frank Strayer
- Written by: Robert Ellis
- Produced by: Maury M. Cohen
- Starring: Richard "Skeets" Gallagher; Lois Wilson; Warren Hymer
- Cinematography: M. A. Anderson
- Edited by: Roland Reed
- Production company: Invincible Pictures Corp.
- Distributed by: Chesterfield Motion Pictures Corp.
- Release date: November 7, 1933 (US)
- Running time: 66 minutes
- Country: United States
- Language: English

In the Money is a 1933 American pre-Code comedy film directed by Frank Strayer from an original screenplay by Robert Ellis. Starring Richard "Skeets" Gallagher, Lois Wilson, and Warren Hymer, the film was produced and distributed by the common tandem duo of Poverty Row studios, Invincible Corp. and Chesterfield Motion Pictures. It premiered on November 7, 1933.

== Cast ==
- Richard "Skeets" Gallagher as Spunk Hobbs
- Lois Wilson as Mary "Lambie" Higginbottom
- Warren Hymer as "Gunboat" Bimms
- Sally Starr as Babs Higginbottom
- Arthur Hoyt as Professor Higginbottom
- Junior Coghlan as Dick Higginbottom
- Erin La Bissonier as Genie
- Harold Waldridge as Lionel
- Louise Beavers as Lily
