= Bachelor Bait =

1934 film by George Stevens

- Film poster
- Directed by: George Stevens
- Screenplay by: Glenn Tryon
- Story by: Edward Halperin; Victor Halperin
- Produced by: Pandro S. Berman
- Starring: Stuart Erwin; Rochelle Hudson; Pert Kelton "Skeets" Gallagher; Berton Churchill; Grady Sutton; Clarence Wilson; Anne Shirley
- Cinematography: David Abel
- Edited by: James B. Morley
- Music by: Max Steiner
- Distributed by: RKO Radio Pictures
- Release date: July 1934
- Running time: 74 minutes
- Country: United States
- Language: English
- Budget: $120,000
- Box office: $195,000

Bachelor Bait is a 1934 American comedy film about a man (William Watts) who is fired from his job issuing marriage licenses at city hall because of the actions of a co-worker. He starts a match making business which becomes very successful because of Mr. Watts' ability to find suitable matches for everybody except for himself. Bachelor Bait (originally titled The Great American Harem) was director George Stevens' first feature-length film for RKO, filmed from 30 April to 18 May 1934. His first feature was The Cohens and Kellys in Trouble (1933), for Universal.

== Plot ==
Mr. William Watts, a kindhearted man who, after losing his job as a civil servant in a marriage license office, opens his own business, Romance Inc., which becomes a successful matrimonial agency. When he sets up his secretary with a wealthy client, he realizes just in time that he is really in love with her.

== Cast ==
- Stuart Erwin as Mr. William Watts
- Rochelle Hudson as Cynthia Douglas
- Pert Kelton as Allie Summers
- Richard "Skeets" Gallagher as Bramwell Van Dusan
- Berton Churchill as "Big" Barney Nolan
- Grady Sutton as Don Beldon/Diker
- Clarence Wilson as District Attorney Clement Craftsman
- Landers Stevens as Mr. Wells

== Analysis ==
According to Marilyn Ann Moss, Bachelor Bait "is a light comedy that touches briefly on the Depression (when mention is made of "everyone being out of work these days") before it supplies its audience with a leisurely paced series of misadventures."

The film lost $3,000 for RKO Studios.

== Production ==
In February 1934, Lou Brock announced The Great American Harem as the next film for Ginger Rogers.

William Seiter was set to direct.

Alice Joyce Moore, daughter of Alice Joyce and Tom Moore, was signed for a role.

Anne Shirley as young girl at Marriage License Office
