= Mayo Methot =

American actress (1904–1951)

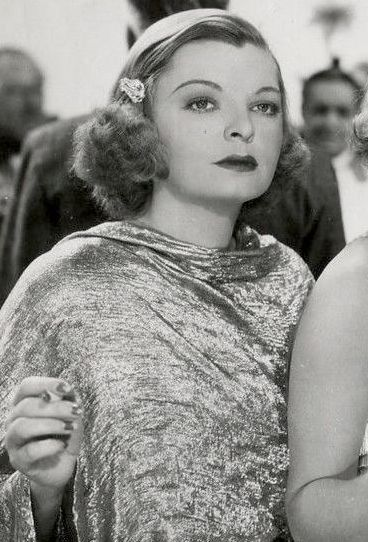
- Methot in 1937
- Born: Mayo Jane Methot; March 3, 1904; Chicago, Illinois, U.S.
- Died: June 9, 1951 (aged 47); Portland, Oregon, U.S.
- Resting place: Portland Memorial Mausoleum
- Occupation: Actress
- Years active: 1909–1940
- Known for: The Night Club Lady; Jimmy the Gent; Marked Woman
- Spouses: John Lamond (m. 1921; div. 1927) Percy T. Morgan, Jr. (m. 1931; div. 1937) Humphrey Bogart (m. 1938; div. 1945)

Mayo Jane Methot (March 3, 1904 – June 9, 1951) was an American film and stage actress. She appeared in over 30 films, as well as in various Broadway productions, and attracted significant media attention for her tempestuous marriage to actor Humphrey Bogart.

Methot appeared in numerous Broadway musicals and plays, including the Vincent Youmans musical Great Day (1929). She then appeared in various supporting roles for Warner Brothers, often portraying hard-edged women. Her film credits include the mystery film The Night Club Lady (1932), the comedy Jimmy the Gent (1934), and the crime drama Marked Woman (1937).

Methot met Bogart on the set of Marked Woman and the two became romantically involved, marrying in 1938. Methot struggled with severe alcoholism, and was diagnosed with paranoid schizophrenia following a suicide attempt in 1943. She divorced Bogart in 1945 after numerous reconciliations. Unable to gain traction in her film career, she returned to her childhood home of Portland, and her alcoholism and depression worsened. She died of complications stemming from alcoholism in 1951, aged 47.

== Life and career ==
=== 1904–1922: Early life and career beginnings ===
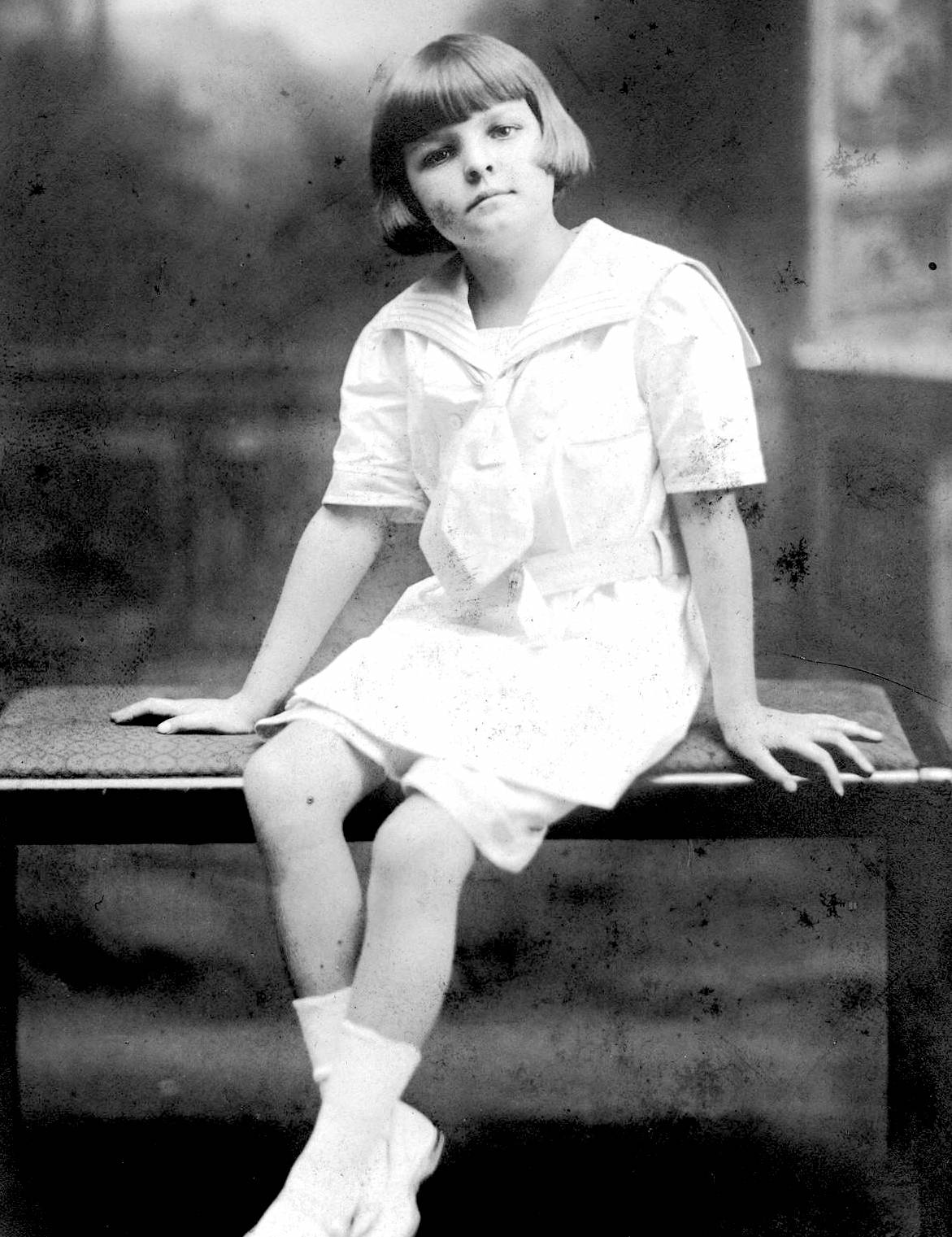
Methot, age eight

Mayo Jane Methot was born March 3, 1904, in Chicago, Illinois, (Note: Many sources erroneously refer to Methot's birthplace as Portland, but her July 1951 obituary in The Oregonian contradicts this, stating that she was in fact born in Chicago; this coincides with 1920 United States census reports from Portland, which list the then-16-year-old Mayo's birthplace as Illinois, and her employment as "stock company theater." A clipping of the original July 1951 obituary that displays Chicago as her birthplace is visible in a 2012 article published by The NW Examiner (see page 15 of issue).) the only child of Beryl Evelyn (née Wood) and John Dillon "Jack" Methot, a ship captain. She was a direct descendant of Zachary Taylor, the 12th President of the United States. Shortly after her birth, the family relocated to Portland, Oregon, where Methot was raised. She showed a proclivity for literature and acting as a young child, memorizing passages from Romeo and Juliet. She began performing on stage professionally at the age of five, appearing as Josef in a Portland production of Sapho, opposite Florence Roberts.

In 1912, Methot starred as David, a young boy, in a production of The Awakening of Helena Richie, at the Grand Opera House in Salem, Oregon. In an article detailing the play, it was noted: "Her grasp of what is required of her during rehearsals of plays is held to be most unusual, while those who have seen her as David in The Awakening of Helena Richie, are warm in their praise of her dramatic ability." In press promoting the production, the then-eight-year-old Methot stated that she was inspired by French actress Sarah Bernhardt. Around this time, she told reporter Fay King of The Spectator: "I'm going to be a fine actress, if I can."

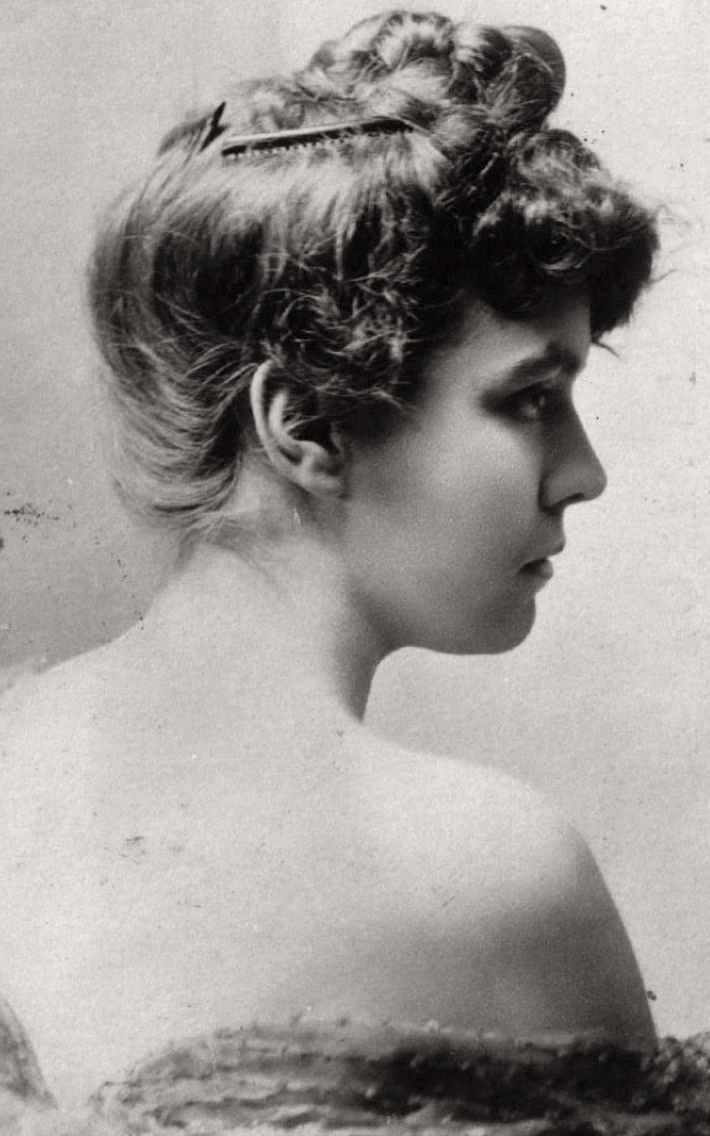
Mayo Methot postcard c. 1922

Methot was subsequently chosen to travel with selected Portland delegates to Washington, D.C., where she presented President Woodrow Wilson with a bouquet of flowers. Methot began performing with the Portland-based Baker Stock Company at age nine, and her frequent appearances in local theater productions earned Methot the nickname "The Portland Rosebud." In 1914, she made her film debut alongside several Baker Stock Company players in a serial short titled Forgotten Songs, produced by the Portland-based American Lifeograph Studios. In January 1916, she starred as the lead in a Baker Stock Company production of The Littlest Rebel.

After Methot graduated from Miss Catlin's School in 1919, she pursued a full-time career with the Baker Stock Company, appearing in an August 1919 production of Come Out of the Kitchen opposite Verna Felton. This was followed by lead roles in the company's Dawn o' the Mountains (staged in May 1920), in which she portrayed a teenage boy; as a bride's sister seeking a lover in Parlor, Bedroom and Bath (October 1920); and in the comedy That Girl Patsy, in May 1921.

While appearing in locally produced serial short films for filmmaker Robert C. Bruce (among them the 1922-released And Women Must Weep), Methot met cameraman Jack Lamond, a war veteran, and the two began a whirlwind romance in the summer of 1921. On September 21 of that year, they married at Saint Luke's Episcopal Church in Vancouver, Washington. Methot continued to perform in local productions with the Baker Stock Company, including Linger Longer Letty in November 1921, and in a revival of Parlor, Bedroom and Bath in March 1922. In November 1922, Methot and Lamond relocated to New York City, where Lamond was employed at Cosmopolitan Productions.

=== 1923–1929: Broadway career ===
Shortly after her arrival in New York, Methot began appearing on Broadway, her first production being director William Brady's The Mad Honeymoon in the summer of 1923. Though the play received unfavorable reviews from critics, Mayo was the lone member of the cast to not receive criticism for her performance.

Based on her performance in The Mad Honeymoon, Methot was cast as the female lead of Leola Lane in George M. Cohan's production of The Song and Dance Man, which opened on New Year's Eve 1923. In 1924, she appeared as The Bride in a Philadelphia production of Owen Davis's The Haunted House. The following year, she returned to Broadway as Phyllis Halladay in Alias the Deacon, opposite Berton Churchill. This was followed by a 1927 production of The Medicine Man, staged by Sam H. Harris at the New Cort Theatre in Queens, New York City. On December 30, 1927, Methot and Lamond divorced, after she asserted that he had deserted her in 1925.

Methot's performance as Florence Wendell in a winter 1929 Broadway production of All the King's Men garnered her praise from Donald Mulhern of the Brooklyn Standard Union, who wrote that she "handles her emotional scenes with both art and warmth and makes the woman very real." She subsequently originated a role in the Vincent Youmans/Billy Rose musical Great Day (1929), introducing the standard "More Than You Know" and several others. Her subsequent performance in Half Gods (also 1929) at the Plymouth Theatre earned critical praise, with Alvin Kayton of The Brooklyn Citizen writing: "As Hope Ferrier, Mayo Methot, recently in Youmans' Great Day, was extraordinarily capable, expressing her part with an emotion and understanding which made Hope seem almost lifelike. We doubt if the role could have been bettered."

=== 1930–1937: Move to Hollywood ===
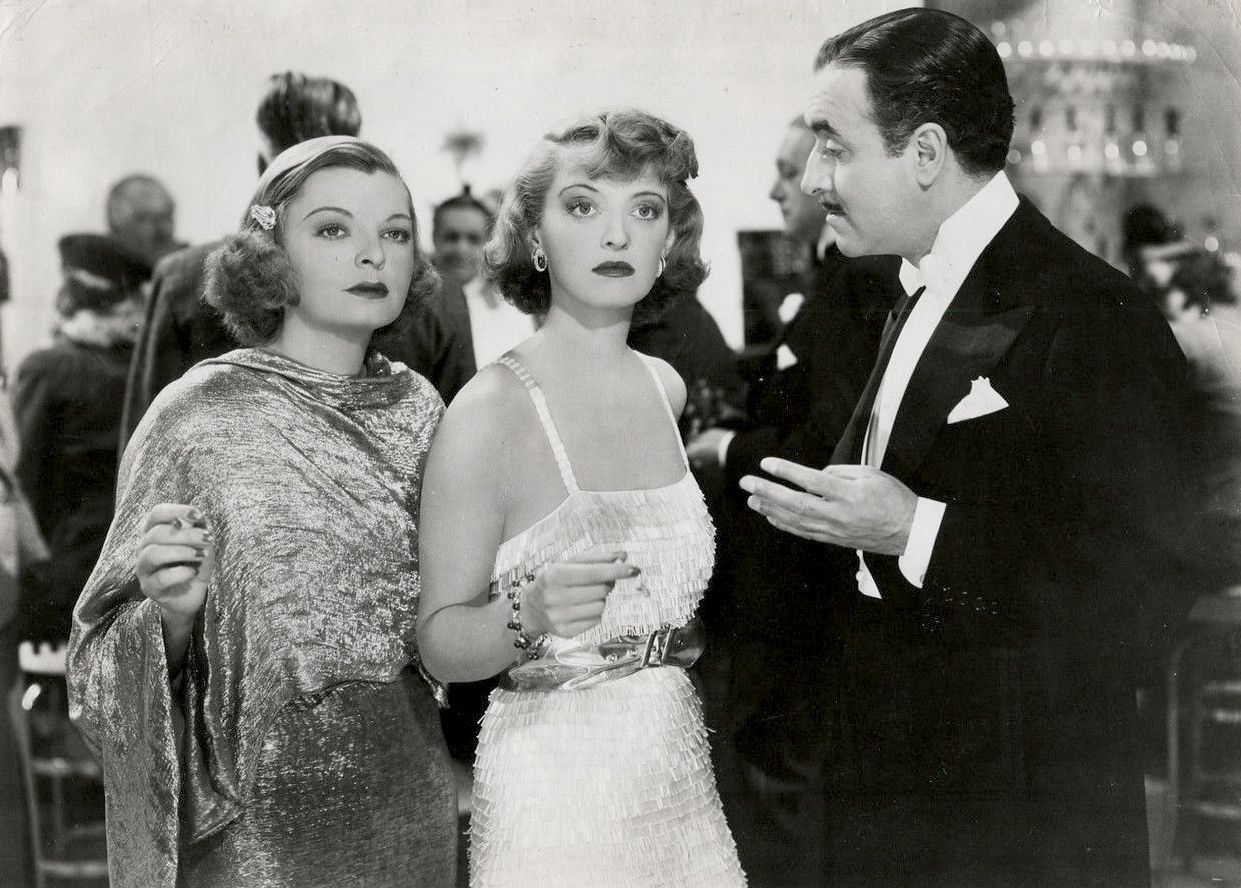
Methot with Bette Davis in Marked Woman (1937)

Methot moved to Hollywood in 1930, hoping to transition from stage to a career in film. She had her first major speaking role in United Artists's gangster film Corsair (1931). On November 28, 1931, Methot married Percy T. Morgan, an oil tycoon and the co-owner with John "Jack" Morgan, of the Cock n' Bull restaurant on Hollywood's Sunset Boulevard, birthplace of the Moscow Mule.

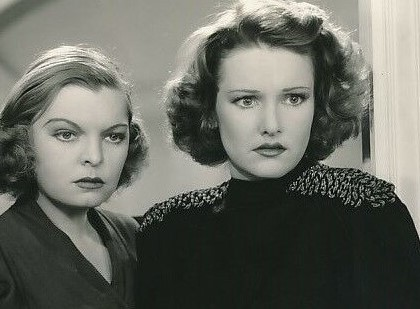
Methot with Lola Lane in Marked Woman (1937)

In 1932, after signing a contract with Warner Bros., Methot starred as the female lead in The Night Club Lady, a murder mystery co-starring Adolphe Menjou. What followed was a long line of roles as unsympathetic second leads and tough-talking "dames" in many of Warner's contemporary crime melodramas, such as The Mind Reader and William Wyler's Counsellor at Law (both 1933), as well as Jimmy the Gent (1934) opposite James Cagney and Bette Davis. In 1934, she had roles in three First National Pictures features: first as a nurse in the drama Registered Nurse, followed by supporting parts in Side Streets and Mills of the Gods.

Methot followed this with minor parts in the Perry Mason mystery film The Case of the Curious Bride, and as a gangster's moll in the crime film Dr. Socrates (both released in 1935). She was subsequently cast in the crime drama Marked Woman (1937), again starring opposite Davis and Humphrey Bogart. Methot divorced her husband, Percy Morgan, in February 1937, claiming that he would not allow her to accept an acting role in New York City.

=== 1938–1944: Marriage to Humphrey Bogart ===
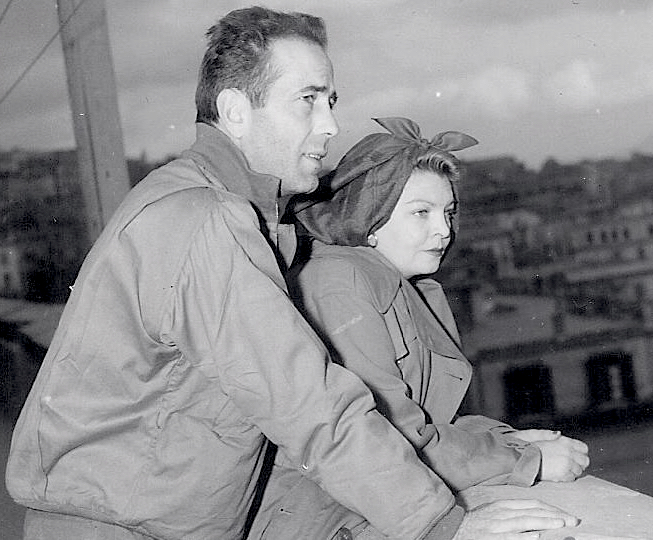
Humphrey Bogart and Methot visiting Naples in 1943

Methot became romantically involved with Humphrey Bogart after co-starring with him in Marked Woman. The couple were married on August 28, 1938, in Beverly Hills. Bogart had been married to actresses Helen Menken and Mary Philips before marrying Methot, and blamed his previous divorces on his wives' careers and their long separations. Two years after Methot and Bogart were married, Methot gave up acting. The two became a high-profile Hollywood couple, but it was not a smooth marriage. Both drank heavily, and Methot gained a reputation for her violent excesses when under the influence. They became known in the press as "The Battling Bogarts", with Methot known, due to her combativeness, as "Sluggy". Bogart later named his motor yacht Sluggy in her honor. After Methot attempted suicide in 1943, Bogart urged her to visit a psychiatrist, and upon doing so, she was diagnosed with paranoid schizophrenia.

During World War II, the Bogarts traveled Europe entertaining the troops. At one point in their travels during the war, the Bogarts met with director John Huston in Italy. During a night of heavy drinking, Methot insisted that everyone listen to her perform a song. Though they tried to persuade her to desist, she sang anyway. The performance was so bad and embarrassing that Huston and Bogart remembered it several years later and based a scene in Key Largo (1948) on the incident, having the alcoholic girlfriend (played by Claire Trevor) of the mobster (played by Edward G. Robinson) struggle through "Moanin' Low" off key in hopes of winning a drink in exchange for her singing. Trevor won an Oscar for her performance in the film.

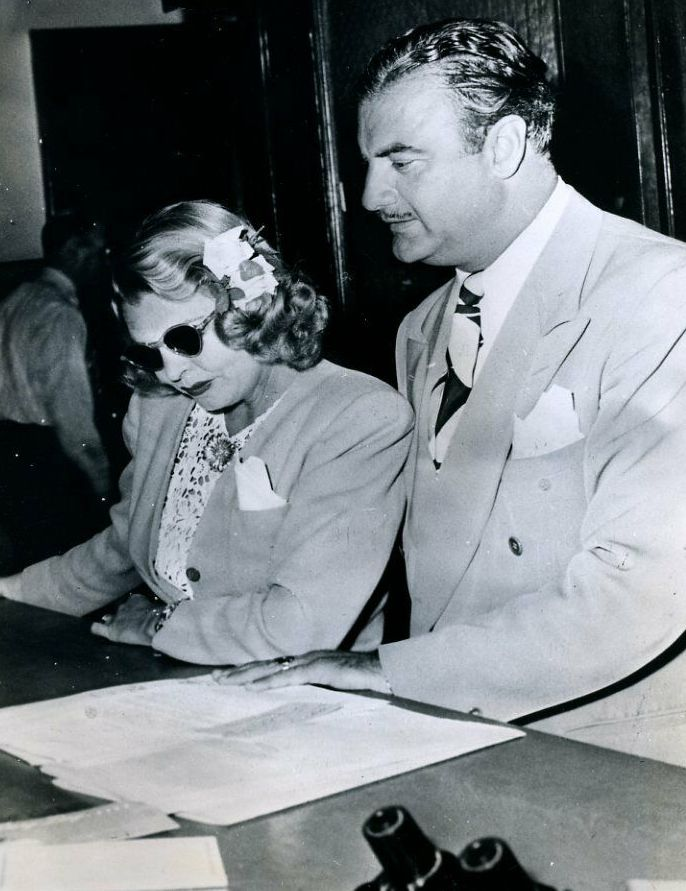
Methot with her attorney during the filing of her divorce from Bogart, 1945

Numerous battles took place at the Hollywood residence of the famous couple, nicknamed Sluggy Hollow, including one in which Methot stabbed Bogart in the shoulder, and another in which the two hit one another in the head with whiskey bottles. Actress Gloria Stuart—a friend of Bogart and Methot—recalled, in her later years, attending a dinner party at which Methot drunkenly brandished a pistol and threatened to shoot Bogart. Stuart also recalled seeing Methot with bruises on her face on several occasions, and witnessing physical fights between the couple, including one in which Bogart tore Methot's dress off of her. The couple separated and reconciled several times over the course of their marriage.

While filming To Have and Have Not in 1943, Bogart fell in love with his 19-year-old co-star Lauren Bacall and the couple began an affair. Methot caught wind of it and visited the set often. Bogart attempted to save the marriage, but Methot's alcoholism intensified, as did their fighting. Bogart announced that he had moved out of the couple's home on October 19, 1944. On October 30, Bogart announced that he had reconciled with Methot and that he was "going home. [...] In other words, we'll return to our normal battles." The reconciliation proved short-lived; Methot announced that Bogart had moved out of their home yet again on December 3, 1944.

=== 1945–1951: Career decline and return to Oregon ===
Methot filed for divorce on May 10, 1945, in a Las Vegas court, which was granted one hour after she filed for the decree. Bogart married Lauren Bacall on May 21, 1945 and had 2 children. After the divorce, Methot retreated from the public eye for several months, and spent a period at the Malabar Farm State Park (the location of Bogart and Bacall's wedding).

In August 1945, Methot attempted to resume a stage career in New York. However, she was unsuccessful, and became locked into a pattern of alcoholism and depression. In the late 1940s, she moved back to Oregon, where her mother helped take care of her.

== Death ==
Methot died on June 9, 1951, at Holladay Park Hospital in Portland. Although it was reported in the press at the time that Methot died of complications from an unspecified surgery, her actual cause of death was attributed to acute alcoholism. Methot left her estate, totaling $50,000 ($620,192 in 2025) to her mother Evelyn. Additionally, she bestowed her personal library of classic books to the Catlin Gabel School, her alma mater, as well as a scholarship fund for the institution.

Methot's remains are interred at the Portland Memorial Mausoleum in the Sellwood neighborhood of Portland, Oregon, alongside her parents. Bogart continued to send flowers to Methot's crypt until his death in 1957.

== Filmography ==
Year	Title	Role	Notes	Ref.
1916	Forgotten Songs		Serial short	
1922	And Women Must Weep		Serial short	
1923	Unseeing Eyes	Extra	Uncredited	
1930	Taxi Talks		Short film	
1931	Corsair	Sophie		
1932	The Night Club Lady	Lola Carewe		
1932	Vanity Street	Fern		
1932	Virtue	Lil Blair		
1932	Afraid to Talk	Marge Winters	Alternative title: Merry-Go-Round	
1933	The Mind Reader	Jenny		
1933	Lilly Turner	Mrs. Durkee	Uncredited	
1933	Goodbye Love	Sandra Hamilton		
1933	Counsellor at Law	Zedorah Chapman		
1934	Jimmy the Gent	Gladys Farrell		
1934	Harold Teen	Sally LaSalle	Alternative title: Dancing Fool	
1934	Registered Nurse	Nurse Gloria Hammond		
1934	Side Streets	Maizie Roach	Alternative title: A Woman in Her Thirties	
1934	Mills of the Gods	Sarah		
1935	The Case of the Curious Bride	Mrs. Florabelle Lawson		
1935	We're in the Money	Minor Role	(scenes deleted)	
1935	Dr. Socrates	Muggsy, Red's Moll		
1936	Mr. Deeds Goes to Town	Mrs. Semple	Uncredited	
1936	The Case Against Mrs. Ames	Cora Lamont		
1937	Marked Woman	Estelle Porter		
1938	Women in Prison	Daisy Saunders		
1938	Numbered Woman	Vicki	Alternative title: Private Nurse	
1938	The Sisters	Blonde		
1939	Should a Girl Marry?	Betty Gilbert		
1939	Unexpected Father	Ethel Stone	Alternative title: Sandy Takes a Bow	
1939	A Woman Is the Judge	Gertie		
1940	Brother Rat and a Baby	Girl in Bus	Alternative title: Baby Be Good, (final film role)	

== Select stage credits ==
Year	Title	Role	Notes	Ref.
1909	Sapho	Josef		
1912	The Awakening of Helena Richie	David	Grand Opera House, Salem, Oregon	
1913	Salvation Nell		Baker Stock Company, Portland, Oregon	
1913	The Builders		Baker Stock Company, Portland, Oregon	
1913	Mary Jane's Pa		Baker Stock Company, Portland, Oregon	
1914	As a Man Thinks		Baker Stock Company, Portland, Oregon	
1914	A Fool There Was		Baker Stock Company, Portland, Oregon	
1914	The Littlest Rebel	Virgie Cary	Baker Stock Company, Portland, Oregon	
1916	On Trial		Baker Stock Company, Portland, Oregon	
1916	The Littlest Rebel	Virgie Cary	Baker Stock Company, Portland, Oregon	
1919	The Littlest Rebel	Virgie Cary	Baker Stock Company, Portland, Oregon	
1919	Come Out of the Kitchen	Claudia Daingerfield	Baker Stock Company, Portland, Oregon	
1920	Dawn o' the Mountains	Bub McNair	Baker Stock Company, Portland, Oregon	
1920	Parlor, Bedroom and Bath	Angelica Irving	Baker Stock Company, Portland, Oregon	
1921	That Girl Patsy	Patricia Davis	Baker Stock Company, Portland, Oregon	
1921	Linger Longer Letty	Nancy	Baker Stock Company, Portland, Oregon	
1922	Parlor, Bedroom and Bath	Angelica Irving	Baker Stock Company, Portland, Oregon	
1923	The Mad Honeymoon	Marie Wilson	Playhouse Theatre	
1923	The Song and Dance Man	Leola Lane	Hudson Theatre	
1924	The Haunted House	The Bride	Broad Street Theatre, Philadelphia	
1925	Alias the Deacon	Phyllis Halliday	Sam H. Harris Theatre	
1927	The Medicine Man		New Cort Theatre, Jamaica, Queens	
1927	What Ann Brought Home	Ann	Wallack's Theatre	
1928	The Song Writer	Patricia Thayer	48th Street Theatre	
1929	All the King's Men	Florence Wendell	Fulton Theatre	
1929	Now-A-Days	Paula Newhall	Forrest Theatre, Philadelphia	
1929	Great Day	Emma Lou Randolph	Cosmopolitan Theatre	
1929	Half Gods	Hope Ferrier	Plymouth Theatre	
1930	Torch Song	Ivy Stevens	Plymouth Theatre	
1931	Torch Song		El Capitan Theatre, Hollywood	
1935	Strip Girl	Dixie Potter	Longacre Theatre	

== Notes and references ==
=== Sources ===
- Barnes, Christine (2004). Only in Oregon: Natural and Manmade Landmarks and Oddities. Helena, Montana: Farcountry Press. ISBN 1-560-37292-3.
- Bradley, Edwin M. (2015). The First Hollywood Sound Shorts, 1926-1931. Jefferson, North Carolina: McFarland. ISBN 978-1-476-60684-2.
- Dietz, Dan (2018). The Complete Book of 1930s Broadway Musicals. Lanham, Maryland: Rowman & Littlefield. ISBN 978-1-538-10277-0.
- Donnelley, Paul (2003). Fade to Black: A Book of Movie Obituaries. New York: Omnibus Press. ISBN 0-711-99512-5.
- Duchovnay, Gerald (1999). Humphrey Bogart: A Bio-Bibliography. Westport, Connecticut: Greenwood Press. ISBN 978-0-313-22338-9.
- Fisher, James; Londré, Felicia Hardison (2017). Historical Dictionary of American Theater: Modernism (2nd ed.). Lanham, Maryland: Rowman & Littlefield. ISBN 978-1-538-10786-7.
- Frank, Alan (1982). Humphrey Bogart. New York: Exeter Books. ISBN 978-0-896-73134-9.
- Paymer, Martin E.; Post, Don E. (1999). Sentimental Journey: Intimate Portraits of America's Great Popular Songs, 1920-1945. Darien, Connecticut: Two Bytes Publications. ISBN 978-1-881-90709-1.
- Roman, James (2015). Chronicles of Old Los Angeles: Exploring the Devilish History of the City of the Angels. Chicago, Illinois: Museyon. ISBN 978-1-938-45076-1.
- Schilling, Lester Lorenzo (1961). The History of the Theatre in Portland, Oregon, 1846-1949 (Thesis). Vol. 2. Madison, Wisconsin: University of Wisconsin-Madison. OCLC 45408028.
- Sickels, Robert C., ed. (August 8, 2013). 100 Entertainers Who Changed America: An Encyclopedia of Pop Culture Luminaries. Santa Barbara, California: ABC-CLIO (published 2013). ISBN 978-1-598-84831-1.
- Stuart, Gloria; Thompson, Sylvia (1999). Gloria Stuart: I Just Kept Hoping. Boston: Little, Brown, and Company. ISBN 0-316-81571-3.
- Thomas, Bob (1990). Clown Prince of Hollywood: The Antic Life and Time of Jack L. Warner. New York: McGraw-Hill. ISBN 978-0-070-64259-1.
- Thorburn, Doug (2000). Drunks, Drugs & Debits: How to Recognize Addicts and Avoid Financial Abuse. Northridge, California: Galt Publishing. ISBN 978-0-967-57883-5.
- Wagner, Laura (2020). Hollywood's Hard-Luck Ladies: 23 Actresses Who Suffered Early Deaths, Accidents, Missteps, Illnesses and Tragedies. Jefferson, North Carolina: McFarland. ISBN 978-1-476-63833-1.
