= The Night Club Lady =

1932 film

- Directed by: Irving Cummings
- Written by: Robert Riskin
- Based on: About the Murder of The Night Club Lady by Anthony Abbot
- Starring: Adolphe Menjou; Mayo Methot; Richard 'Skeets' Gallagher
- Cinematography: Ted Tetzlaff
- Edited by: Maurice Wright
- Production company: Columbia Pictures
- Distributed by: Columbia Pictures
- Release date: August 27, 1932
- Running time: 66 minutes
- Country: United States
- Language: English

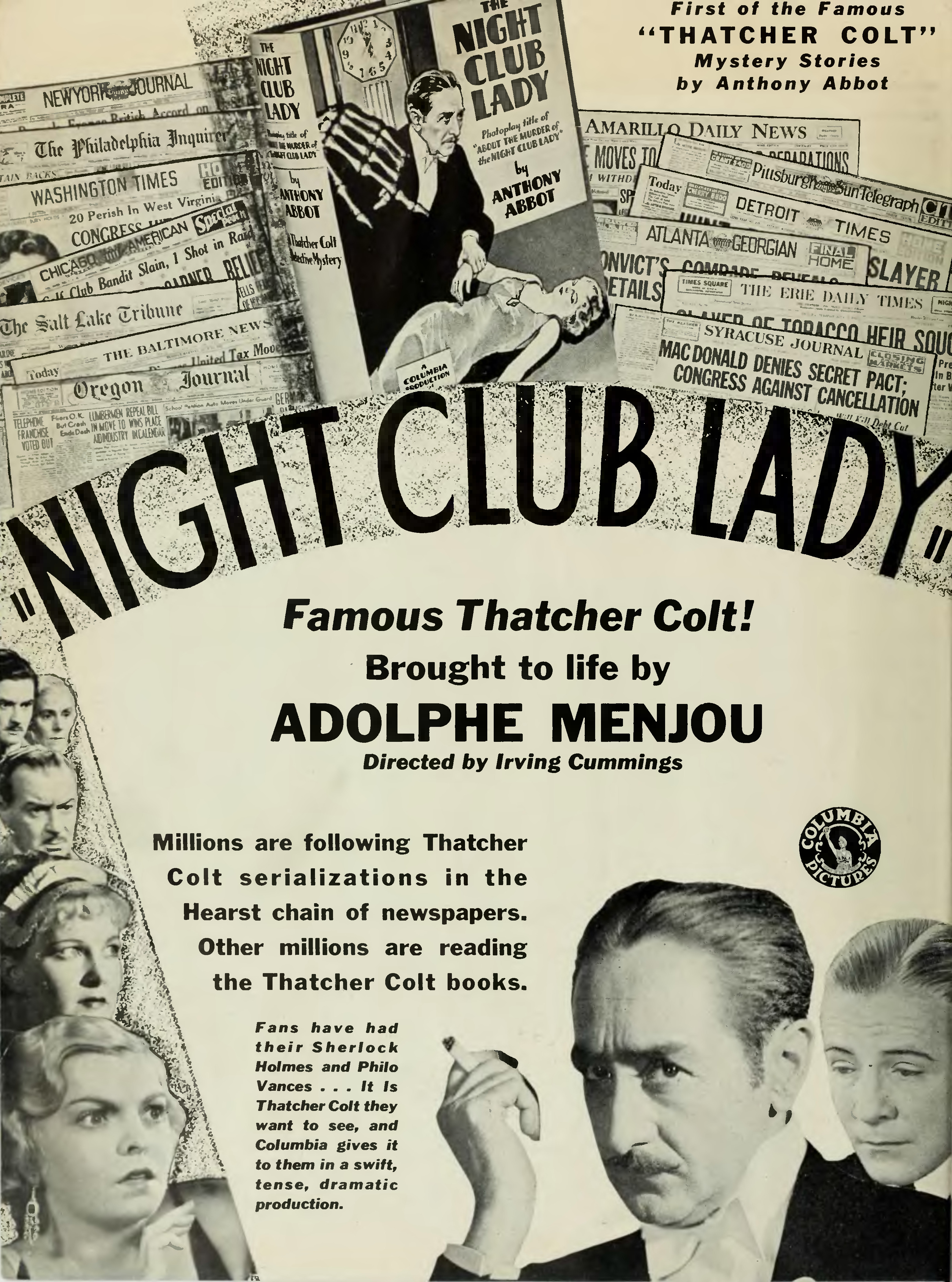
Night Club Lady in The Film Daily, 1932

The Night Club Lady is a 1932 American pre-Code mystery film directed by Irving Cummings and starring Adolphe Menjou, Mayo Methot, and Richard 'Skeets' Gallagher. It was followed by a sequel The Circus Queen Murder in 1933 with Menjou reprising his role. A third, unrelated film featuring Thatcher Colt, The Panther's Claw, was released in 1942.

== Cast ==
- Adolphe Menjou as Police Commissioner Thatcher Colt
- Mayo Methot as Lola Carewe
- Richard 'Skeets' Gallagher as Tony
- Ruthelma Stevens as Miss Kelly
- Blanche Friderici as Mrs. Carewe
- Nat Pendleton as Mike McDougal
- Albert Conti as Vincent Rowland
- Greta Granstedt as Eunice Tahon
- Ed Brady as Bill
- Frank Darien as Dr. Magnus
- Gerald Fielding as Guy Everett
- George Humbert as Andre
- Olaf Hytten as Walter - Colt's Butler
- Lee Phelps as Joe
- Teru Shimada as Ito Mura
- Wilhelm von Brincken as Dr. Emil Lengle
- Niles Welch as Dr. Baldwin

== Bibliography ==
- Backer, Ron. Mystery Movie Series of 1930s Hollywood. McFarland, 2012.
