= Vanity Street =

1932 film

- Directed by: Nick Grinde
- Written by: Frank Cavett; Edwards Roberts; Gertrude Purcell; Robert Riskin
- Produced by: Harry Cohn
- Starring: Charles Bickford; Helen Chandler; Mayo Methot
- Cinematography: Joseph H. August
- Edited by: Gene Havlick
- Production company: Columbia Pictures
- Distributed by: Columbia Pictures
- Release date: October 15, 1932
- Running time: 67 minutes
- Country: United States
- Language: English

Vanity Street is a 1932 American Pre-Code crime drama film directed by Nick Grinde and starring Charles Bickford, Helen Chandler and Mayo Methot. It was produced and distributed by Columbia Pictures.

== Plot ==
A New York policeman assists a woman when she's down-on-her-luck, helping her get a job at the Follies. She falls in love with him but he for some reason pushes her away, and right into the arms of a no-good thief. When he finds himself arresting her for a murder, he knows she did not commit it, so he sets out to clear her by finding the real killer.

== Cast ==
- Charles Bickford as Brian Murphy
- Helen Chandler as Jeanie Gregg
- Mayo Methot as Fern Cavan
- George Meeker as Val French
- Arthur Hoyt as Albert Kerr- aka Mr. Tidy
- Raymond Hatton as Shorty
- Ruth Channing as Rose Marie
- Dolores Ray as Susan
- Claudia Morgan as Lou
- Ann Fay as Mary Ann
- Kathrin Clare Ward as Mrs. Truitt - Mary Ann's Mother
- May Beatty as Mrs. Dantry
- Oscar 'Dutch' Hendrian as Grogan
- Eddie Boland as Joe
- Eddy Chandler as Taxi Driver
- Clay Clement as Samuel D. Marcus - Producer
- Sumner Getchell as Scottie
- Ben Hall as Stage Door Johnnie in Bearskin Coat
- Lew Kelly as Justice of the Peace
- J.M. Kerrigan as Dan - Irish Cop
- Fuzzy Knight as Drunk
- Walter McGrail as Detective Hanson
- Lee Phelps as Detective
- Hal Price as Bennie
- Florence Roberts as Annie - Fern's Maid
- Buddy Roosevelt as Stage Door Johnnie
- Matty Roubert as Newspaper Vendor
- Harry Schultz as Bartender
- Harry Semels as Italian Street Workman
- Ruthelma Stevens as Show Girl

== Bibliography ==
- Ian Scott. In Capra's Shadow: The Life and Career of Screenwriter Robert Riskin. University Press of Kentucky, 2015.
