= Ruthelma Stevens =

American actress

- Born: October 23, 1903
- Died: June 1, 1984 (aged 80)
- Occupation: Actress
- Years active: 1932–1957 (film)
- Spouse: Waldo H. Logan (1933-1933)

Ruthelma Stevens (1903–1984) was an American film actress.

Stevens's mother was Mrs. Beatrice Stevens.

Stevens's film debut came in Life Begins. She was signed to a long-term contract after acting on the Broadway stage. Broadway plays in which she appeared included Speak Easy (1927), Jarnegan (1928), Hotel Universe (1930), Roadside (1930), Anatol (1931), Life Begins (1932), and A Red Rainbow (1953).

Stevens married Waldo H. Logan, a "wealthy young sportsman" in Yuma, Arizona, in November 1933. The marriage was disclosed in June 1934.

== Filmography ==
Year	Title	Role	Notes
1932	The Night Club Lady	Miss Kelly	
1932	Life Begins	Rose 'Rosie' Laughton	uncredited
1932	Vanity Street	Show Girl	uncredited
1932	No More Orchids	Rita	
1933	Grand Slam	Muriel	uncredited
1933	The Mind Reader	Ann Holman	uncredited
1933	The Circus Queen Murder	Miss Kelly	
1933	The Working Man	Mrs. Price	
1933	Ann Carver's Profession	Dinner Party Guest	uncredited
1933	Curtain at Eight	Doris Manning	
1934	The Scarlet Empress	Countess Elizabeth 'Lizzie'	
1934	Desirable	Brunette in Theatre	uncredited
1934	Wake Up and Dream	Miss Banks	uncredited
1935	The Florentine Dagger	Fraulein von Elsner - Actress	uncredited
1935	People Will Talk	Doris McBride	
1935	Chinatown Squad	The Drunk's Wife	uncredited
1935	Dante's Inferno	Girl in Stoke-Hold	uncredited
1935	Orchids to You	Evelyn Bentley	
1949	Not Wanted	Miss James	
1949	The Fountainhead	Roark's Secretary	uncredited
1950	Trial Without Jury	Mrs. Mannings	
1950	A Life of Her Own		Uncredited
1950	Harvey	Miss LaFay	uncredited
1951	Apache Drums	Betty Careless	
1951	Too Young to Kiss	Jeffrey's Mother	uncredited
1957	Jet Pilot	Saleswoman	uncredited, final film role

== Bibliography ==
- Solomon, Aubrey. The Fox Film Corporation, 1915-1935: A History and Filmography. McFarland, 2011.
