= For the Love of Mike (1927 film) =

1927 film by Frank Capra

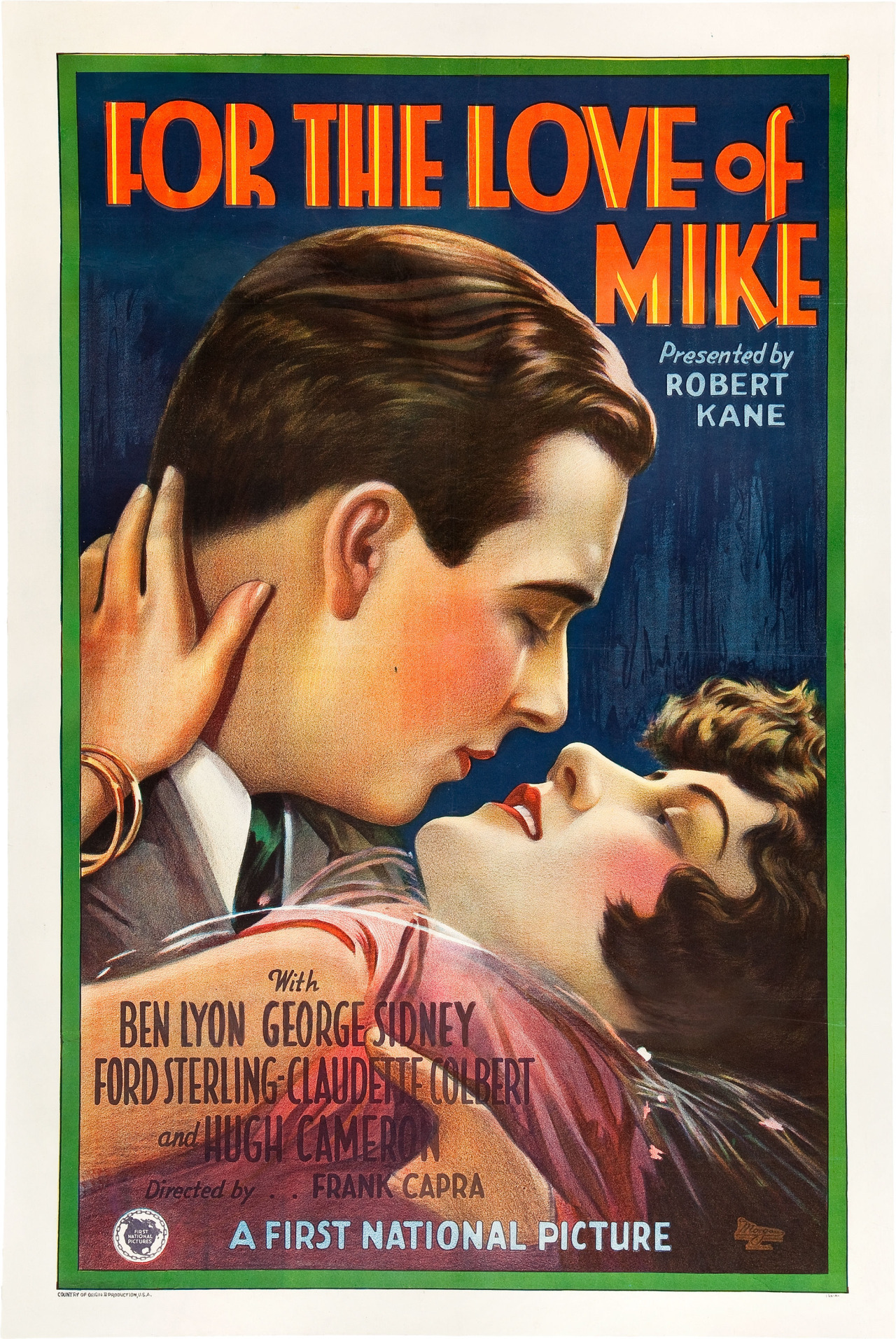
- Film poster
- Directed by: Frank Capra
- Written by: J. Clarkson Miller; Leland Hayward
- Based on: Hell's Kitchen by John A. Moroso
- Produced by: Robert Kane
- Starring: Ben Lyon; Claudette Colbert; George Sidney; Richard "Skeets" Gallagher; Ford Sterling; Hugh Cameron
- Cinematography: Ernest Haller
- Production company: Robert Kane Productions
- Distributed by: First National Pictures
- Release date: July 31, 1927
- Running time: 75 min
- Country: United States
- Languages: Silent; English Intertitles

For the Love of Mike (originally titled Hell's Kitchen) is a 1927 American silent romantic drama film. Directed by Frank Capra, it starred Claudette Colbert (in her film debut) and Ben Lyon. It is now considered to be a lost film.

== Plot ==
A baby boy is found abandoned in a Hell's Kitchen tenement and subsequently is raised by three men: a German delicatessen owner, a Jewish tailor, and an Irish street cleaner. They adopt the boy and raise him as their own. The timeline jumps 20 years into their future. The now-grown Mike resists going to college because he does not wish to be a financial burden to his adoptive fathers, however a pretty Italian girl, Mary working at the delicatessen convinces him to go.

Mike enrolls at Yale and gains a reputation as a sports hero. He disavows his three fathers, which leads to the Irishman giving him a thrashing in front of the boy's best friends. He begins to associate with gamblers and ends up owing them money. To settle his debts, they demand he purposely lose the school's big rowing match with Harvard. His three fathers and the girl come to support him during the race, and he defies the gamblers and wins the race. His three fathers then come forward to confront and deal with the gamblers.

== Cast ==
- Ben Lyon as Mike
- Claudette Colbert as Mary
- George Sidney as Abraham Katz
- Ford Sterling as Herman Schultz
- Hugh Cameron as Patrick O'Malley
- Richard "Skeets" Gallagher as Coxey Pendleton
- Rudolph Cameron as Henry Sharp
- Mabel Swor as Evelyn Joyce

== Background ==
For the Love of Mike is based on the story Hell's Kitchen by John Moroso. Frank Capra himself referred to the film as his first flop. Having recently ended his association as writer/director for actor Harry Langdon, this became Capra's first opportunity to direct a New York based production. Producer Robert Kane had contracts to provide First National Pictures with 10 films, and had planned each to be financed with profits from the preceding.

For the Love of Mike was the tenth in this package, funding was limited, and agent Leland Hayward convinced Capra into deferring his salary until the end of production. Capra was never paid for his participation. The film was considered a commercial failure despite a strong cast and decent production values.

The film is marked as being the screen debut of Claudette Colbert and her only silent film appearance. After the film received poor reviews and failed financially, Colbert vowed, "I shall never make another film". However, two years later, she signed with Paramount Pictures.

== See also ==
- List of lost films
