= Curtain at Eight =

1933 film

- Directed by: E. Mason Hopper
- Written by: Edward T. Lowe Jr. (screen story); Octavus Roy Cohen (novel The Back Stage Mystery)
- Produced by: Larry Darmour (executive producer); Phil Goldstone (producer)
- Starring: C. Aubrey Smith; Dorothy Mackaill; Paul Cavanagh
- Cinematography: Ira H. Morgan
- Edited by: Otis Garrett
- Production company: Larry Darmour Productions
- Distributed by: Majestic Pictures
- Release date: October 1, 1933
- Running time: 68 minutes
- Country: United States
- Language: English

Curtain at Eight is a 1933 American pre-Code mystery film directed by E. Mason Hopper and starring C. Aubrey Smith, Dorothy Mackaill and Paul Cavanagh.

== Plot summary ==
Wylie Thornton is the star of "Isle of Romance" at the Edwin Booth Theater. He is two-timing his wife, Alma Thornton, as well as Lola Cresmer, her sister Anice Cresmer, and Doris Manning, three actresses in the play. Thornton has been nice to Geraldine, the chimpanzee, and she has a crush on the handsome man. Geraldine has figured out how to open and close her wheeled cage, numbered "7", which is in the Property Room of the theater. Mack, the property master, does not like that, or her, and mistreats the "monk". In the Property Room, Geraldine gets her hands on a .32 caliber unrifled revolver and in handling the gun, accidentally fires it.

Roaming the dressing rooms, Geraldine takes a photograph of Thornton from his room back to her cage. Upset by Thornton's two-timing, Anice Cresmer, who plays "Tonga" in "Isle of Romance", takes her own life; she is found by her sister Lola. Wylie Thornton has gambling debts and in a row with his wife, Alma, gets called a "cackling boudoir rooster" and a "flannel mouth Romeo". Alma takes his money and then gives Wylie forty dollars while making him owe her seventy five dollars. Wylie Thornton is leaving for a bigger engagement in New York and a farewell party is held for him. He gets a birthday cake with thirty four candles; Mack, who was putting in the candles, says "that ham is forty four if he's a day". Geraldine, on the loose again, has evaded the property master and climbs up into the flies of the theater. In preparation for the presentation of the cake, the lighting on stage is turned off and the lit cake is brought out, to everyone's delight. Thornton blows out the candles.

In the darkness, a shot rings out and is followed by screams like those that a chimpanzee would make. When the lights come back on, Thornton is found dead. This precipitates the arrival of the young and quick to jump to conclusions Captain Marty Gallagher, the Captain of Detectives, whose catch phrase is "It's in the bag!". Mooney, the newspaper reporter, calls him "'Arrest 'em in a hurry' Gallagher". Another detective, the older and methodical Jim Handley, labeled by Gallagher as the "new dick from the D.A.'s office", is also on the case. Mooney tags along with Gallagher and occasionally gives him some tips. While Gallagher is getting everyone locked up, Handley finds the revolver in a drop hanging from the flies. Alma Thornton is found shot in her apartment. In the operating room, Handley is told that in her delirium, Alma has been saying "lovely".

That leads him to question Loveley Holmes about the Thornton's and the gambling debts. Handley returns to the theater to find a crowd outside the Property Room. He goes in and finds the room in disorder and Geraldine on the loose. Firing a shot, he orders her to get back into her cage, to which she complies. Handley then finds the prop master in the room, dead. Gallagher arrives and quickly wraps up the case. As Handley is leaving the theater, he meets Lola. He tells her that he would have done the same thing if that was his sister, meaning that he would have shot Thornton just as she had. He tells her that she does not have to worry, as Gallagher proved it was the chimpanzee that shot Wylie Thornton and that Lovely Holmes will be charged with shooting Alma Thornton.

== Cast ==
- C. Aubrey Smith as Jim Hanvey – Detective
- Dorothy Mackaill as Lola Cresmer
- Paul Cavanagh as Wylie Thornton – Actor
- Sam Hardy as Martin Gallagher – Captain of Detectives
- Marion Shilling as Anice Cresmer
- Russell Hopton as Terry Mooney – Reporter
- Natalie Moorhead as Alma Jenkins Thornton
- Hale Hamilton as Major Manning
- Ruthelma Stevens as Doris Manning
- Arthur Hoyt as Watkins – Night Watchman
- Dot Farley as Ella – Party Guest
- Jack Mulhall as Carey Weldon

== Bibliography ==
- Pitts, Michael R. Poverty Row Studios, 1929–1940: An Illustrated History of 55 Independent Film Companies, with a Filmography for Each. McFarland & Company, 2005.
