= The Panther's Claw =

1942 film by William Beaudine

- Directed by: William Beaudine
- Written by: Anthony Abbot (short story); Martin Mooney (screenplay)
- Produced by: Lester Cutler (producer); T.R. Williams (associate producer)
- Cinematography: Marcel Le Picard
- Edited by: Frederick Bain
- Distributed by: Producers Releasing Corporation
- Release date: March 3, 1942
- Running time: 70 minutes
- Country: United States
- Language: English

The Panther's Claw is a 1942 American mystery film directed by William Beaudine and distributed by Producers Releasing Corporation. It is a loose sequel to two Columbia Pictures films of the 1930s, The Night Club Lady and The Circus Queen Murder.

== Plot ==
After a policeman catches Everett P. Digberry leaving a cemetery in the middle of the night, Digberry explains that he was instructed to leave $1,000 on his aunt's grave. He is brought to police headquarters where he explains that he received a letter with instructions from someone called the Panther, and several others who received similar letters are with the police as well. The police commissioner determines that the group members are all connected with an opera company. They suggest a baritone named Enrico Lombardi who may have a motive, as he was recently banished from the company.

Lombardi is enraged to find his name in the newspaper as the prime suspect and confronts Nina Politza, who had received a letter from the Panther. Digberry intervenes but Lombardi chokes and strikes him.

The police attempt to identify the Panther by comparing the typewritten letters to samples from various typewriters. The killer is revealed to be Captain Edgar Walters.

== Cast ==
- Sidney Blackmer as Police Commissioner Thatcher Colt
- Rick Vallin as Anthony 'Tony' Abbot
- Byron Foulger as Everett P. Digberry
- Billy Mitchell as Nicodemus J. Brown
- Herbert Rawlinson as District Attorney Bill Dougherty
- John Ince as Police Captain Mike Flynn
- Martin Ashe as Officer Murphy
- Walter James as Police Captain Tim Henry
- Frank Darien as Samuel Wilkins
- Joseph DeVillard as Antonio Spagucci
- Jack Van as Giuseppe Bartarelli
- Willy Castello as John Martin George
- Harry Clark as Officer Lou Levinsky
- Lew Leroy as Apartment Manager
- Gerta Rozan as Nina Politza
