= Richard "Skeets" Gallagher =

American actor (1891–1955)

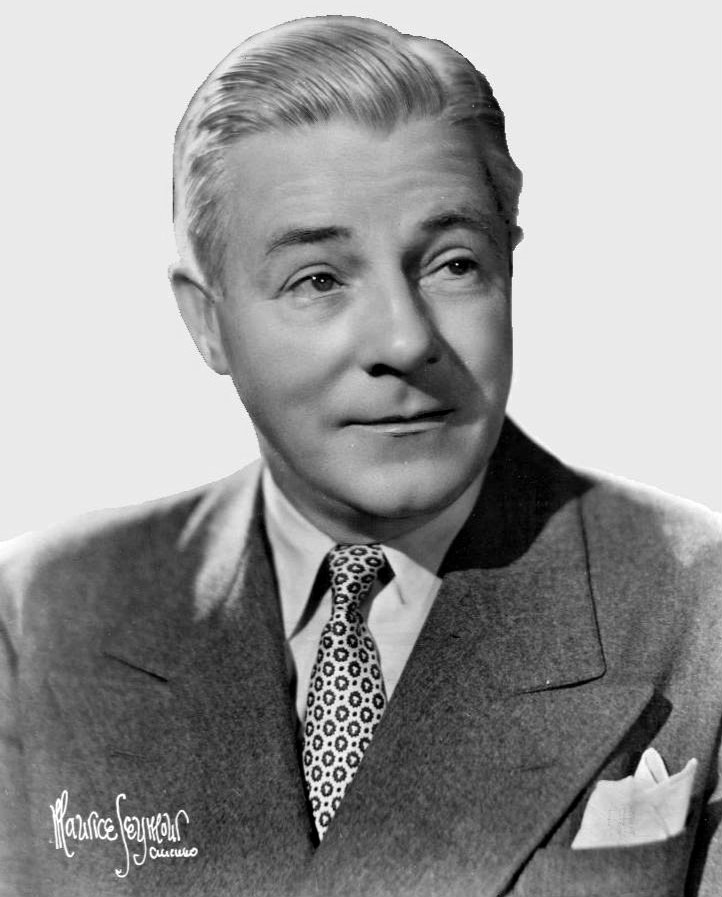
- Gallagher in 1944
- Born: July 28, 1891; Terre Haute, Indiana, U.S.
- Died: May 22, 1955 (aged 63); Santa Monica, California, U.S.
- Other name: Skeets Gallagher
- Occupation: Actor
- Years active: 1915–1952
- Spouse(s): Irene Martin (divorced) Pauline Mason (m. 1929)
- Children: 2

Richard "Skeets" Gallagher (July 28, 1891 – May 22, 1955) was an American actor. He had blue eyes and his naturally blond hair was tinged with gray from the age of 16.

== Biography ==
Gallagher was born on July 28, 1891, in Terre Haute, Indiana. As a child he was nicknamed Skeets, short for mosquito, because of his frequent speedy bursts of running.

Gallagher was educated at Rose Polytechnic Institute and Indiana University. He first studied civil engineering and then law. His stage career began by writing a one-act skit that he took to a local theatre group. He started acting in vaudeville, and later signed with Paramount Pictures.

He appeared in Frank Capra's first feature film For the Love of Mike (1927), a silent film now considered a lost film, and in several early sound films.

He died on May 22, 1955, in Santa Monica, California from a heart attack.

Gallagher campaigned for the reelection of President Herbert Hoover in 1932.

== Partial filmography ==
- The Daring Years (1923) – College boy
- The Potters (1927) – Red Miller
- New York (1927) – Buck
- For the Love of Mike (1927) – Coxey Pendleton
- Finders Keepers (1928) – Soldier who pursues Blondy (uncredited)
- Alex the Great (1928) – Alex the Great
- Three-Ring Marriage (1928) – Gangster
- The Racket (1928) – Miller
- Stocks and Blondes (1928) – Tom Greene
- Close Harmony (1929) – Johnny Bay
- The Dance of Life (1929) – (uncredited)
- Fast Company (1929) – Bert Wade
- Pointed Heels (1929) – Dash Nixon
- Honey (1930) – Charles Dangerfield
- Paramount on Parade (1930) – Supporting Role – Episode 'The Gallows Song'
- The Social Lion (1930) – Chick Hathaway
- Love Among the Millionaires (1930) – Boots McGee
- Let's Go Native (1930) – King Jerry
- Her Wedding Night (1930) – Bob Talmadge
- It Pays to Advertise (1931) – Ambrose Peale
- The Stolen Jools (1931, Short) – Reporter
- Up Pops the Devil (1931) – Biney Hatfield
- The Road to Reno (1931) – Hoppie
- Possessed (1931) – Wally Stuart
- The Trial of Vivienne Ware (1932) – Graham McNally
- Merrily We Go to Hell (1932) – Buck
- Bird of Paradise (1932) – Chester
- The Night Club Lady (1932) – Tony
- The Phantom of Crestwood (1932) – Eddie Mack
- The Sport Parade (1932) – Dizzy
- The Conquerors (1932) – Benson (uncredited)
- The Unwritten Law (1932) – Pete Brown
- The Past of Mary Holmes (1933) – Ben Pratt
- Reform Girl (1933) – Joe Burke
- Easy Millions (1933)
- Too Much Harmony (1933) – Johnny Dixon
- In the Money (1933) – Spunk Hobbs
- Alice in Wonderland (1933) – Rabbit
- The Meanest Gal in Town (1934) – Jack Hayden
- The Crosby Case (1934) – The Reporter – Miller
- Woman Unafraid (1934) – Anthony Desmond
- Riptide (1934) – Erskine
- Bachelor Bait (1934) – Bramwell Van Dusen
- Lightning Strikes Twice (1934) – Wally Richards
- The Perfect Clue (1935) – Ronnie Van Zandt
- Yours for the Asking (1936) – Perry Barnes
- The Man I Marry (1936) – Jack Gordon
- Polo Joe (1936) – Haywood
- Hats Off (1936) – Buzz Morton
- Espionage (1937) – Jimmy Brown
- Mr. Satan (1938) – Connelly
- Danger on the Air (1938) – Finney Fish
- Idiot's Delight (1939) – Donald Navadel
- Citadel of Crime (1941) – Chet
- Zis Boom Bah (1941) – Professor Warren
- Brooklyn Orchid (1942) – Tommy Lyman Goodweek
- Duke of Chicago (1949) – Gus Weller
- Three for Bedroom "C" (1952) – Dining Car Steward (uncredited)
