= Stocks and Blondes =

1928 film

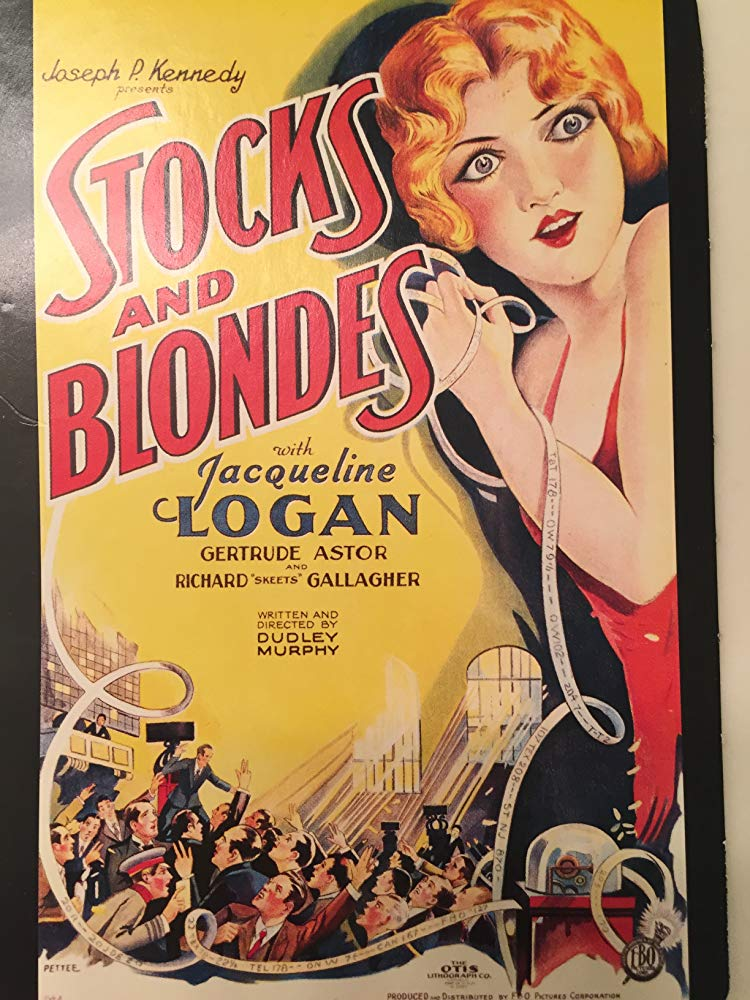
- Directed by: Dudley Murphy
- Written by: Randolph Bartlett; John W. Conway; Dudley Murphy
- Produced by: Louis Sarecky
- Starring: Gertrude Astor; Jacqueline Logan; Richard 'Skeets' Gallagher
- Cinematography: Virgil Miller
- Edited by: Pandro S. Berman
- Production company: FBO
- Distributed by: FBO
- Release date: September 9, 1928
- Running time: 60 minutes
- Country: United States
- Languages: Silent; English intertitles

Stocks and Blondes is a 1928 American silent comedy film directed by Dudley Murphy and starring Gertrude Astor, Jacqueline Logan and Richard 'Skeets' Gallagher. It is also known by the alternative title of Blondes and Bonds.

== Cast ==
- Gertrude Astor as Goldie
- Jacqueline Logan as Patsy
- Richard 'Skeets' Gallagher as Tom Greene
- Albert Conti as Powers
- Henry Roquemore

== Bibliography ==
- Roy Liebman. From Silents to Sound: A Biographical Encyclopedia of Performers who Made the Transition to Talking Pictures. McFarland, 1998.
