= Mills of the Gods (1934 film) =

- Lobby card
- Directed by: Roy William Neill
- Screenplay by: Garrett Fort
- Produced by: Robert North
- Starring: May Robson; Fay Wray; Victor Jory
- Edited by: John Rawlins
- Production company: Columbia Pictures
- Distributed by: Columbia Pictures
- Release date: December 15, 1934
- Running time: 66 minutes
- Country: United States
- Language: English

Mills of the Gods is a 1934 film directed by Roy William Neill.

== Premise ==
The film starts 40 years after Mary Hastings inherits her deceased husband's family business. When Mary herself retires, she hands it over to the board of directors, as she is skeptical of her family's ability to run the business. Soon afterwards, the great depression causes the business to lose profits.

== Cast ==
- May Robson as Mary Hasting
- Fay Wray as Jean Hasting
- Victor Jory as Jim Devlin
- Raymond Walburn as Willard Hastings
- James Blakely as Alex Hastings
- Josephine Whittell as Henrietta Hastings
- Mayo Methot as Sarah
- Albert Conti as Count Filippo Di Fraschiani
- Samuel S. Hinds as Burroughs
- Willard Robertson as Thomas

== Reception ==
The Monthly Film Bulletin called the film a "weak, deficient piece of fanfare" that could "only attract the Regular Robson fans".
