= Will Oursler =

American novelist (1874–1951)

William Charles Oursler (July 12, 1913 – January 7, 1985) was an American author, lecturer and radio commentator, and the son of noted novelist and playwright Fulton Oursler. He frequently wrote and spoke on religious and inspirational subjects.

Born in Baltimore, his family soon moved to New York City, where Will grew up and attended school. After a brief stint at art school (Oursler attended the Art Students League of New York), he decided to complete college and graduated cum laude from Harvard University in 1937. After graduation, Oursler worked on the staffs of various Boston newspapers and began writing in earnest. His first book, The Trial of Vincent Doon, was published in 1941, followed by Folio on Florence White in 1942.

Oursler served as a war correspondent for Fawcett Publications during World War II. After the war, he began contributing numerous articles and short stories to well known magazines such as Collier's and Reader's Digest. Oursler also wrote non-fiction as well as novels and mysteries; non-fiction titles include Father Flanagan of Boys' Town about Father Edward J. Flanagan's work with young men (in collaboration with his father), The Boy Scout Story, The Murderers (with Harry Anslinger), and The Road to Faith. N.Y. N.Y. is perhaps Oursler's best known novel.

Over the course of his career Oursler wrote more than 45 books including 12 mystery novels. He was vice-president of the Mystery Writers of America, a founding commodore of the Overseas Yacht Club, and president of the Overseas Press Club from 1970 to 1972. His autobiography, Family Story, was published in 1963.

Oursler also wrote under the names Gale Gallagher and Nick Marino.

He also co-wrote "My Life with Edgar Cayce by David E. Kahn, as told to Will Oursler", Doubleday ed., 1970.
