= The Perfect Clue =

1935 film by Robert G. Vignola

- Directed by: Robert G. Vignola
- Written by: Lolita Ann Westman; Albert DeMond; Donald H. Brown; Ralph Ceder
- Produced by: Larry Darmour
- Starring: David Manners; Richard 'Skeets' Gallagher; Betty Blythe
- Cinematography: Herbert Kirkpatrick
- Edited by: Dwight Caldwell
- Music by: Lee Zahler
- Production company: Larry Darmour Productions
- Distributed by: Majestic Pictures
- Release date: March 13, 1935
- Running time: 64 minutes
- Country: United States
- Language: English

The Perfect Clue is a 1935 American comedy crime film produced by Larry Darmour for Majestic Pictures, directed by Robert G. Vignola and starring David Manners, Richard 'Skeets' Gallagher and Betty Blythe. The screenplay was written by Albert DeMond based on the story Lawless Honeymoon by Lolita Ann Westman. The film was released on March 13, 1935.

== Plot ==
Jerome Stewart (William P. Carleton) throws an elegant dinner party to announce his engagement to Ursula Chesebrough (Betty Blythe), but the engagement comes as a total surprise to his daughter, Mona (Dorothy Libaire), who doesn't like Ursula and takes it badly. Longtime admirer and inebriate Ronnie Van Zandt (Richard 'Skeets' Gallagher) convinces her to run away and elope with him, although she does not love him. The two board the train for Buffalo but Mona soon changes her mind and gets off the train at a whistle stop and attempts to hire a car from Johnny Rourke to drive her to Albany, but instead employs David Mannering (David Manners) as he is coming out of a café. He drives her to a remote area and robs her, leaving her behind. Later he comes back for Mona, and agrees to drive her to where she wants to go as Mona feigns a sprained ankle for sympathy. The car gets stuck in the mud and they are forced to spend the night in the car until David can find someone to pull them out in the morning.

Somewhat infatuated with David by now, Mona wants to know more about him, he tells her that he got out of prison a month prior, and that he had been a bank teller and had been accused of stealing money, although he claims that he didn't do it. Stewart and Ronnie track Mona to the whistle stop but soon discover that Rourke was not hired by Mona, and they then hire him to drive them to Albany. Meanwhile, Mona is frightened by a bull, causing her to run from it and David discovers her ruse. Once they get to Albany, David plans to see a man by the name of Delany (Robert Gleckler) for work at a bowling alley/pool hall. He tries to get Mona to get out of the car which attracts an audience, then she tells a policeman that she and David are newlyweds arguing over where the honeymoon will be.

Just before David goes to see Delaney, Sid Barkley (Ralf Harolde) and Butch Carter (Ernie Adams) demand $10,000 from Delaney, their cut from a previous job that they took the rap for. Delaney refuses and Carter knifes him in the back, and the two ransack the office looking for money then flee. Delaney has enough life left in him to hide the note from the two criminals in a bowling pin. David discovers Delaney on the floor, saying "the pin" just before dying. David, afraid of being connected to the murder leaves the back way and flees the area with Mona in the car.

Since David was the only person to see Delaney before he was killed, police begin a frantic search for him although Mona believes he is innocent. After the police catch up with them, both David and Mona are arrested for the murder. Jerome and Ronnie visit Mona in jail, she tells her father that she loves David, and that he is innocent and insists he get them both out of jail. Mona's father visits David, who refuses help from him and asks him to get his daughter out of jail.

Jerome asks Mona to forget David, since his fingerprints were found on the knife and he is the leading suspect. Mona still insists David is innocent, and that she had seen two men drive away from Delaney's place. Mona and Ronnie try to determine what Delaney meant when he said "the pin" just before he died. Mona and Ronnie go to Delaney's office to find clues to the pin, while Barkley and Carter also go there to retrieve the letter they sent him. Mona calls the police just before Barkley and Carter discover she and Ronnie are in the office and the men try to escape the back way but are caught by the police. Mona finds Barkley and Carter's letter in a hinged bowling pin that is lying on the floor. Later the two men confess and David is found innocent. Mona and David reunite.

== Cast ==
- David Manners as David Mannering
- Richard 'Skeets' Gallagher as Ronnie Van Zandt
- Dorothy Libaire as Mona Stewart
- Betty Blythe as Ursula Chesebrough
- William P. Carleton as Jerome Stewart
- Ralf Harolde as Sid Barkley
- Ernie Adams as Butch Carter
- Robert Gleckler as Delaney
- Frank Darien as Stationmaster
- Charles C. Wilson as District Attorney
- Jack Richardson as Simms
- Pat O'Malley as Police Officer
- Lloyd Ingraham as Dinner Guest
- Bud Jamison as Johnny O'Rourke
- Frank LaRue as Chief of Police
- Sam McDaniel as Train Porter
- Broderick O'Farrell as Dinner Guest
