= Thomas Frost (writer) =

English journalist, lecturer and Chartist

Thomas Frost (16 December 1821 – 16 July 1908) was an English writer, journalist, lecturer, printer and Chartist.

== Early years ==
Thomas Frost was born in Croydon in Surrey (now part of Greater London) on 16 December 1821, the son of a tailor who had read William Cobbett's Political Register and took part in the agitation to secure the Reform Act 1832. Apprenticed to a printer (his cousin Cornelius Chapman) in Norwood, London, Thomas started his own printing firm in the same town after Chapman's business became bankrupt.

== Career ==
In 1846 he took over the publication of John Goodwyn Barmby's Communist Chronicle, a monthly paper which had been discontinued for financial reasons. Frost revived the Chronicle as a weekly publication and reduced the price from 3d. to 1d. with Barmby retaining editorial control. Differences between Barmby and Frost on their aims caused publication to cease. Frost then started a short-lived Communist Journal. From 1847 to 1848 he was associated with the Fraternal Democrats.

According to the historian Peter Gurney, Frost's difficulty making money through radical journalism encouraged him to write the semipornographic novel Emma Mayfield (1848), which sold around 10,000 copies. It was inspired by William Hogarth's A Harlot's Progress and the serial model provided by Eugene Sue.

From 1859 Frost was a leader writer for the Liverpool Albion weekly newspaper, on foreign politics and social questions. The newspaper maintained a political viewpoint independent of the main political parties until 1872, when a new proprietor, a member of the Conservative Party, recast the paper as a morning daily. Frost's terms of employment were now changed so that he was only paid for articles that were published; he was contracted to provide two articles per week, but many were not published, being politically incompatible. His income falling by one-third he left the Albion.

Frost subsequently settled in Barnsley, South Yorkshire, and worked as a reporter for the Barnsley Times and the Barnsley Chronicle. He wrote a number of books, mostly by his own admission "potboilers". He estimated his annual income from journalism and other literary undertakings to have been less than £200 per year. He died in 1908.

Frost claimed it was not until he read the poetry of Mary Shelley that he learned of "the connexion between the influence of circumstances in the formation of character and the new organization which Owen desired to give society". Frost became an active Chartist and Owenite and although he believed in revolution he stopped short of taking part in a revolutionary conspiracy to avoid arrest. He above all desired independence and wrote that "the assumption by Mr. Gladstone of the leadership of the Liberal party in the House of Commons seemed to promise the inauguration of a new era".

== Magic history ==
Frost wrote three books on the history of magic. His Lives of the Conjurers (1876) is considered to be the first significant history of magic. M. Thomas Inge described the book as "a full-fledged chronicle of magic and an invaluable reference work".

The magician Harry Houdini wrote that they were the "best books of their kind up to the time of their publication, but they are marked by glaring errors, showing that Frost compiled rather than investigated."

Frost's book Lives of the Conjurers is said to contain errors in relation to the magician Wiljalba Frikell. Magic historian Walter B. Gibson noted that "the information offered by Mr. Thomas Frost and his successors, concerning Frikell, is in the main incorrect and unreliable."

=== Death ===
Thomas Frost died 16 July 1908.

== See also ==
- Sydney W. Clarke
- Henry R. Evans

== Works ==
- Circus Life and Circus Celebrities (1875, 1881)
- Old Showmen and the Old London Fairs (1875)
- The Lives of the Conjurors (1876)
- The Life of Thomas Lord Lyttelton (1876)
- The Secret Societies of the European Revolution, 1776–1876 (vol. 1) (London: Tinsley Bros., 1876)
- The Secret Societies of the European Revolution, 1776–1876 (vol. 2) (London: Tinsley Bros., 1876)
- Forty Years' Recollections: Literary and Political (London: S. Low, Marston, Searle, and Rivington, 1880)
- Modern Explorers (1882)
- Reminiscences of a Country Journalist London: Ward, 1886.
