= Mulla Muhammad Mahdi Naraqi =

Muhammad Mahdi Naraqi
- Title: Mullah

Personal life
- Born: 1715 Naraq, Iran
- Died: 1795 (aged 79–80) Najaf, Iraq
- Other name: Mahdi Naraqi

Religious life
- Religion: Islam, Twelver Shi’ism

Senior posting
- Based in: Markazi, Iran
- Period in office: 1715-1795

Muhammad Mahdi Naraqi (Persian: محمد مهدی نراقی) (1715–1795) was a Twelver Shi'i scholar, theologian and moral philosopher. Al-Naraqi was a brilliant thinker of the late 12th/18th and early 13th/18th century. His son, Molla Ahmad Naraqi, was also a celebrated Twelver scholar. In the Qajar dynasty, he was prominent scholar at the philosophy and continued philosophical activities in the Kashan, Iran.

== Biography ==
Mulla Muhammad Mahdi Naraqi was born in Naraq, a city in the central district of Delijan, Markazi, Iran in 1715 AD. He was known as Muhaqiqi Naraqi (the Naraqian scholar) and Khatam al-Hukama (the signet of wises) amongst people.

== Education ==
After preliminary studies, he went to seminary of Najaf, Iraq. After several years, he returned to Iran and went to seminary of Isfahan and educated in that seminary for thirty years. He was the master of jurisprudence, theology, philosophy, astronomy, and mathematics. Also, he was fluent in Hebrew and Latin to connect with Jewish and Christian scholars. Jame al-Sa'adat is the important work that was in the field of ethics. One of his teachers was Mulla Ismail ibn Muhammad Husayn Khwajui.

== Death ==
He died on 1795 (23 Muharram 1209 AH) and was buried near Ali ibn Abi Talib shrine in Najaf.

== See also ==
- 17-animal inheritance puzzle, a mathematical puzzle whose first publication is in the works of Muhaqiqi Naraqi
