= Dr. Socrates =

1935 film by William Dieterle

- Directed by: William Dieterle
- Written by: Robert Lord (screenplay); Mary C. McCall, Jr. (adaptation)
- Based on: "Dr. Socrates"; 1935 story in Collier's by W. R. Burnett
- Produced by: Robert Lord
- Starring: Paul Muni; Ann Dvorak; Barton MacLane
- Cinematography: Tony Gaudio
- Edited by: Ralph Dawson
- Music by: Bernhard Kaun; Heinz Roemheld
- Production company: Warner Bros. Pictures
- Distributed by: Warner Bros. Pictures
- Release date: October 19, 1935
- Running time: 70 minutes
- Country: United States
- Language: English

Dr. Socrates is a 1935 American crime film directed by William Dieterle and starring Paul Muni as a doctor forced to treat a wounded gangster, played by Barton MacLane.

== Plot ==
The death of his fiancée in a car crash so unnerves top surgeon Dr. Lee Cardwell that he moves to a rural community and becomes a general practitioner, but he attracts few patients. The local doctor calls him Dr. Socrates because he always has his head in a book of classics.

Bank robber Red Bastian comes to him after he is shot in the arm during his latest caper. Lee treats Red, but is unwillingly to accept payment. Red, however, makes him take a $100 bill for his trouble.

Later on, while on his way to another bank job, Red picks up hitchhiker Josephine Gray. While Red's gang is busy robbing the bank, Josephine tries to run away, but gets shot. She is treated by Dr. Socrates. At first, the police think that she is a gang "moll", but she is cleared and recuperates at the doctor's home.

Red and his gang kidnap her and take her to their hideout, which the doctor had visited earlier on a medical call. He tells the police where to find the gang, but asks that they give him a chance to get Josephine safely away. He convinces the gang members that they need to be inoculated against an outbreak of typhoid fever, but what he really gives them is a knockout drug. He takes care of Red himself. Lee is a hero, and even the local doctor says nice things about him.

== Cast ==
- Paul Muni as Lee Cardwell
- Ann Dvorak as Josephine Gray
- Barton MacLane as Red Bastian
- Robert Barrat as Dr. Ginder
- John Eldredge as Dr. Burton
- Hobart Cavanaugh as Stevens
- Helen Lowell as Ma Ganson
- Mayo Methot as Muggsy
- Henry O'Neill as Greer
- Grace Stafford as Caroline Suggs
- Samuel Hinds as Dr. McClintick
- June Travis as Dublin
- Raymond Brown as Ben Suggs
- Olin Howland as Bob Catlett
- Joseph Downing as Cinq Laval
- Grady Sutton as General Store Clerk
- Adrian Morris as Beanie - a Gangster

== Critical reception ==
Andre Sennwald of the The New York Times wrote that the film was a "minor league melodrama" that marked a departure from some of Paul Muni's loftier roles, but that it was "pleasant enough." He commented that Barton MacLane "enlivens the film" with his performance, and that the film "is fortunate, too, in the presence of such interesting players as Robert Barrat, Helen Lowell, Hobart Cavanaugh, Mayo Methot and Edward McWade in the minor parts."

Variety commented that Dr. Socrates arrived at the "tail-end of the G-Man and gangster cycle", and although lacking "the vigor of some of its predecessors", it was an exciting film. Acknowledging Muni's reputation for playing difficult parts, they continued "For an actor of his calibre the soft-spoken doc seems a minor effort." Ann Dvorak played a role that had "no great punch, and in Miss Dvorak's hands it seldom sparkles."

Writing for The Spectator in 1936, Graham Greene gave the film a poor review, dismissing it as "a third-rate gangster film". Despite comparing Paul Muni's performance to personality performers like Greta Garbo and Joan Crawford, Greene concludes that his effort in Dr Socrates "is not one of Muni's successful films".
