= The Circus Queen Murder =

1933 film

- Directed by: Roy William Neill
- Written by: Jo Swerling
- Based on: a Liberty magazine story by: Fulton Oursler; Anthony Abbot
- Produced by: Robert North
- Starring: Adolphe Menjou; Donald Cook; Greta Nissen
- Cinematography: Joseph H. August
- Edited by: Richard Cahoon
- Production company: Columbia Pictures
- Distributed by: Columbia Pictures
- Release date: April 10, 1933
- Running time: 63 minutes
- Country: United States
- Language: English

The Circus Queen Murder is a 1933 American pre-Code mystery film directed by Roy William Neill and starring Adolphe Menjou, Donald Cook and Greta Nissen. It is the sequel to the 1932 film The Night Club Lady in which Menjou had also starred as Thatcher Colt. The film is based on a story by "Anthony Abbott", a pseudonym used by Fulton Oursler.

== Plot ==
New York Police Commissioner Thatcher Colt (Adolphe Menjou) decides to take a vacation after six years of fighting crime, accompanied by his attractive secretary, Miss Kelly (Ruthelma Stevens). On the train to their destination, they spot a rundown circus, "The Greater John T Rainey Shows", heading to the same place. The circus is home to a love triangle: Josie La Tour (Greta Nissen), her husband Flandrin (Dwight Frye) (whom she is intent on divorcing), and her lover The Great Sebastian (Donald Cook (actor)), all three trapeze performers.

Jim Dugan (Harry Holman), the circus's press agent, recognizes his old friend Colt as the circus parades through town and gives him and Kelly free passes. Josie La Tour's horse is spooked and runs away with her; La Tour escapes unharmed.

Dugan takes a reluctant Colt to see Rainey (George Rosener) that night. Rainey tells him that someone is out to destroy his show; each of the principal performers received an anonymous note telling them not to perform tomorrow - Friday the 13th - or they will die. He also cites La Tour's near accident. Colt, however, suspects that it is all a publicity stunt concocted by Dugan. Kelly reveals that the runaway horse was engineered by Flandrin popping a balloon; she also was able to lipread what Flandrin said to his wife just before: "You double-crossing cheat. I'll kill the both of you." Rainey also informs Colt that La Tour, the star attraction, owns half the circus. When they go to see Flandrin, they find a note saying that he is the "first to go", a bullet hole in the window of his wagon and blood on his cot. However, there is no body, which arouses Colt's suspicions. Then La Tour's beloved dog is found with its throat cut. As Colt is questioning La Tour, someone throws a voodoo doll through her window.

The next day, Kelly reports that the blood is not human. Colt surmises that it is dog's blood, and he noticed an extra member of the "cannibal" troupe last night, Flandrin in disguise. Colt searches the circus for the madman. He advises Rainey to cancel the performance, but La Tour insists on going on with the show.

Outside, unnoticed, Flandrin climbs to the top of the Big Top tent. Sebastian is nearly killed when one of trapeze ropes gives way, partially cut by Flandrin, but he escapes unscathed. The audience believes it is all part of his act. Then La Tour performs, also on the trapeze. Flandrin shoots her with a poison dart using a blowgun. She falls to the ground and dies. Afterward, when Colt roams the grounds, he encounters Flandrin, armed with a pistol and holding Kelly captive. He orders Colt to see to it that Sebastian is alone in the tent with La Tour's body. When he sees people leave the tent, he ventures inside with Kelly, then shoots Sebastian in the back. It is actually Colt in disguise and wearing bulletproof clothing (borrowed from the circus). Flandrin races into the Big Top to put on his last performance, high in the air. At the end, he shoots himself.

== Cast ==
- Adolphe Menjou as Thatcher Colt
- Ruthelma Stevens as Miss Kelly
- Greta Nissen as Josie La Tour
- Donald Cook as The Great Sebastian
- Dwight Frye as Flandrin
- Harry Holman as Jim Dugan
- George Rosener as John T. Rainey
- Helene Chadwick as Crying Woman
- Eddy Chandler as Roustabout
- Clay Clement as Lubbell
- Bud Geary as Roustabout
- Frank Mills as Circus Man at Washtub
- Lee Phelps as Reporter

== Bibliography ==
- Backer, Ron. Mystery Movie Series of 1930s Hollywood. McFarland, 2012.
