= Wiljalba Frikell =

Magician and author

Fireside games; for winter evening amusement (1856), readable pdf file

Wiljalba Frikell (June 27, 1818 – October 10, 1903) was a famous magician and author. His stage name was Friedrich Wilhelm Frickel and he also went by W. Frickel and Wiljalba Frickel.

He was born in Sagan, Prussia.

Thomas Frost wrote about him. Houdini wrote about him and visited his home and was photographed outside it. He wanted to meet with him, but Frikell died after finally agreeing to a meeting.

== Writings ==
- Magic No Mystery: Conjuring Tricks with Cards, Balls, and Dice, Magic Writing, Performing Animals, Etc., Etc. (1876)

== See also ==
- 17-animal inheritance puzzle
