= List of films condemned by the Legion of Decency =

This is a list of films condemned by the National Legion of Decency, a United States Catholic organization. The National Legion of Decency was established in 1933 and reorganized in 1965 as the National Catholic Office for Motion Pictures (NCOMP). Under each of these names, it rated films according to their suitability for viewing, assigning a code of A, B, or C, with that of C identified as "Condemned" for viewing by Catholics. The C rating was issued from 1933 until 1978. The Legion's ratings were applied to movies made in the United States as well as those imported from other countries. Since it reviewed films when released for distribution, the Legion usually rated non-U.S. films a few years after their first release in their country of origin, occasionally years after. For example, it rated Marcel Pagnol's 1936 César in 1948 and Marlene Dietrich's 1930 The Blue Angel in 1950.

The rating system was revised in 1978 and the designation "condemned" has not been assigned to films since then. Instead, films that would earlier have been rated C or B were all rated O, which meant "morally offensive". NCOMP reassigned ratings to old films based on its new system, making it impossible to determine from their own database whether a film it now classifies O was originally B or C. In 1980, NCOMP ceased operations, along with the biweekly Review, which by then had published ratings for 16,251 feature films.

Legion-organized boycotts made a C rating harmful to a film's distribution and profitability. In some periods the Legion's aim was to threaten producers with a C rating, demand revisions, and then award a revised B rating. At other times the Legion, preferring to avoid the notoriety and publicity that films gained from having a C rating revised to B, refused to remove their original rating, which resulted in industry self-censorship that achieved the Legion's aims with less public conflict. For example, Elia Kazan's A Streetcar Named Desire was cut by 4 minutes to avoid a C rating, and Billy Wilder cut scenes from the original play to avoid a C for The Seven Year Itch. Spartacus underwent similar editing to avoid a C rating.

Most condemned films were made outside of the studio system, being either exploitation films produced by Poverty Row studios or movies made outside the United States for audiences that were principally non-American and non-English speaking, often distributed by exploitation presenters. (Note: Sova nevertheless describes Ecstasy as "one of the few foreign films to earn a 'C' (condemned) rating from the Catholic Legion of Decency.") Of the 53 movies the Legion had placed on its condemned list by 1943, only Howard Hughes' The Outlaw was the product of a major U.S. studio and it would not receive a wide release until 1946. After The Moon is Blue (1953) and Baby Doll (1956) received C ratings, it was a decade before two more major Hollywood movies received the C rating: The Pawnbroker (1964) and Kiss Me, Stupid (1964).

Films are often reported to have been condemned in general terms, that is, they were criticized or even denounced, when they did not receive the Legion's C rating. Some rely on a list of films that were condemned early in the 1930s by the Archdiocese of Chicago in advance of the Legion of Decency's rating system, (Note: Other Catholics proposed announcing only lists of films approved for viewing so as not to publicize the names of films judged unsuitable for viewing. Those backing this strategy, such as the Diocese of Brooklyn, used a list drawn up by the Federation of Catholic Alumnae.) Turner Classic Movies, for example, has programmed a festival of "Movies Condemned by the Catholic Legion of Decency" that included several that were not rated C by the Legion. (Note: Three 1933 films included by TCM were not rated by the Legion: Design for Living, Baby Face, and Wild Boys of the Road. Others misrepresent the Chicago list of the product of the Legion of Decency as well.)

== 1936 ==
- Adolf Strongarm, a Swedish import (Adolf Armstarke).
- Extase or Ecstasy (1933), an import from Czechoslovakia.
- Elysia (1933), an exploitation pseudo-documentary about nudism by Bryan Foy
- Les Amours de Toni (1935), a French import directed by Jean Renoir.
- Carnival in Flanders, a French import
- Gambling with Souls, an exploitation film described by The New York Times as "a so-called exposé of the vice racket".
- Living Dangerously, an English import produced by British International Pictures.
- Pitfalls of Youth, possibly an alternative title for the exploitation film Marihuana, by Dwain Esper.
- The Private Life of Henry VIII (1933), an English import starring Charles Laughton.
- Whirlpool of Desire, a French import originally titled Remous.

== 1937 ==
- Assassin of Youth, an exploitation film about marijuana.
- Club de femmes (1936), a French import.
- Damaged Goods, an exploitation film released by Grand National Films Inc., a minor producer-distributor that operated from 1936–1939. Also distributed as Marriage Forbidden.
- Damaged Lives, a sexploitation film about venereal disease, purportedly commissioned by a health council.
- The Lie of Nina Petrovna, a French import.
- Lucrezia Borgia (1935), a French historical drama directed by Abel Gance.
- Slaves in Bondage, an exploitation film about prostitution.

== 1938 ==
- Children of the Sun, an exploitation pseudo-documentary.
- Human Wreckage, a sexploitation film about venereal disease, also distributed as Sex Madness.
- It's All in the Mind (1937), an exploitation film by Bernard B. Ray, dealing with hypnosis with a sex-positive message.
- The New Testament a.k.a. Indiscretions, a French comedy from Sacha Guitry.
- Orage, a French import, which the Legion calls L'Orage.
- The Pace That Kills (1935), an exploitation film about cocaine use.
- The Puritan, a French import.
- Race Suicide, an exploitation film about prostitution and abortion.
- The Wages of Sin, an exploitation film about prostitution.

== 1939 ==
- The Human Beast (1938), a French import originally titled La Bête Humaine, directed by Jean Renoir.
- Le Jour Se Lève or Daybreak, a French import directed by Marcel Carné, condemned for its "general atmosphere of sordidness and abnormality".
- Last Desire, a French–Italian import.
- Mad Youth, an exploitation film by Willis Kent.
- Rasputin, a French import directed by Marcel L'Herbier.
- Reefer Madness, an exploitation film about marijuana by George Hirliman, also distributed as Tell Your Children.
- Sinful Daughters, a sexploitation film about abortion endorsing birth control.
- Smashing the Rackets, an exploitation film loosely based on the early career of Thomas E. Dewey. (Note: The Legion used the title Smashing the Vice Racket.)
- With a Smile, a French import directed by Maurice Tourneur.

== 1940 ==
- Hôtel du Nord, a French import directed by Marcel Carné.
- The Kiss of Fire, a French import
- Lash of the Penitentes (1936/1937), an exploitation film from Harry Revier.
- The Merry Wives, a Czech import.
- Pépé le Moko (1937), a French import directed by Julien Duvivier and starring Jean Gabin.
- Souls in Pawn, a sexploitation film, one of several directed by Melville Shyer.
- Stolen Paradise, a sexploitation film by George Hirliman, also released as Adolescence and condemned by the Legion under that title.
- Strange Cargo, initially condemned. Metro-Goldwyn-Mayer made revisions and the Legion changed its rating to "unobjectionable for adults".
- This Thing Called Love, initially condemned for failing to reflect the "Christian concept of marriage"; the Legion revised the rating to B after Columbia Pictures removed fifteen lines of dialogue the Legion objected to.
- Time in the Sun, a documentary compiled from footage shot by Sergei Eisenstein. The Legion called its account of Mexican history "an ideological perversion of the subject to purposes of Marxian Communism".

== 1941 ==
- City of Sin, a sexploitation film
- Fighting the White Slave Trade (1926), a sexploitation film.
- Nine Bachelors, a French import.
- The Girl from Maxim's (1933), a British import. The Legion said: "Vice is portrayed attractively; virtue ridiculed."
- No Greater Sin, a sexploitation film about a campaign to prevent the spread of venereal disease.
- Le Roi (1936), a French import.
- Two-Faced Woman, Greta Garbo's last film, initially condemned for its "immoral and un-Christian attitude toward marriage and its obligations; impudently suggestive scenes, dialogue, and situations; [and] suggestive costumes". Within a month Metro-Goldwyn-Mayer made changes sufficient for the Legion to revise its rating to B. (Note: The New York Times described the resulting film as "slightly laundered". It said "this ancient fable of the wife who parades as her own gaudy twin sister to get her husband back" was altered at the Legion's insistence by "the insertion of a telephone call wherein the husband learns in advance of his wife's intended deception.")
- Volpone, a French film directed by Maurice Tourneur.

== 1942 ==
- Passion Island, a Mexican import directed by Emilio Fernández as La Isla de la Pasiòn.

== 1943 ==
- ¡Ay, qué tiempos, señor Don Simón!, a Mexican import.
- Child Bride (1938), also presented under the title Dust to Dust, an exploitation film about underage marriage.
- Confessions of a Vice Baron, a sexploitation film.
- Tentaciòn, a Spanish import directed by Fernando Soler.
- The Outlaw, a Western produced and directed by Howard Hughes, initially condemned. Rating changed to B in 1950 after revisions.

== 1945 ==
- Mom and Dad, a sexploitation film that purported to teach sexual hygiene.

== 1947 ==
- Black Narcissus, a British import from the Powell and Pressburger team about Anglican nuns challenged by life in an exotic environment, initially condemned. The Legion reclassified it A-II (morally unobjectionable for adults) after revisions to "all prints of this film".
- Forever Amber, when 20th Century Fox encountered distribution problems because of the C rating, its president Spyros Skouras got the Legion to call off its pickets and boycott campaign by making cuts to the film, adding "an innocuous prologue", and making "a humiliating public apology" to the Legion.
- Nais, a French import.

== 1948 ==
- The Bandit, an Italian import starring Anna Magnani.
- César, a French import from 1936 by Marcel Pagnol, in which the Legion found "Irreverent and blasphemous treatment of religious practices".
- Dedee, a French import condemned for its "low atmosphere" and "sordidness".
- Devil in the Flesh, a French import condemned for its "sympathetic portrayal of illicit actions."
- Fric-Frac, a French import produced a decade earlier.
- The Genius and the Nightingale, an Italian import produced in 1943 and titled Maria Malibran, a biopic of soprano Maria Malibran (1808–1836).
- Incorrigible, a Swedish import (Rötägg) directed by Arne Mattsson.
- Merry Chase, an Italian import (La resa di Titì) starring Rossano Brazzi.
- Passionelle, a 1947 French film by Edmond T. Gréville, also known as Pour une nuit d'amour, initially condemned. Rated B following revisions for copies distributed in the U.S. and Canada.
- The Room Upstairs, a French import starring Marlene Dietrich and Jean Gabin.
- Sins of the Fathers, a Canadian import.
- Street Corner, an exploitation film.
- Torment, 1944 Swedish film with a screenplay by Ingmar Bergman, initially condemned. When revised, its rating was changed to B for prints distributed in the U.S.
- When Love Calls, an Italian romantic musical.

== 1949 ==
- The Blue Lagoon, a British import from director Frank Launder, starring Jean Simmons, condemned as "too shocking and almost pornographic". Universal-International cut 15 minutes for its U.S. release to satisfy the Legion of Decency.
- The Devil's Sleep, an exploitation film.
- Germany, Year Zero, an Italian import from director Roberto Rossellini.
- Hollywood Burlesque, an exploitation film featuring a filmed performance from the Hollywood Theater, San Diego.
- Just a Big Simple Girl, a French import condemned as "totally lacking in moral compensation".
- Rozina, the Love Child, a Czech import.
- The Story of Bob and Sally, an exploitation film.
- The Wench, a French import.

== 1950 ==
- Bitter Rice, an Italian import (Riso Amaro), initially condemned for "Suggestive situations and costuming. Suicide in plot solution." Revisions earned a B rating, which applied only to prints in the U.S.
- The Blue Angel (1930), a release of the original German-language version of the film starring Marlene Dietrich.
- Bullet for Stefano, an Italian import starring Rossano Brazzi
- Flesh Will Surrender, an Italian import.
- Gigi, a French import starring Danièle Delorme.
- Hoboes in Paradise, a French import.
- Jungle Stampede, which according to the Legion "purports to be a documentary and educational in nature" but condemned for its handling of its subject matter, "native customs and habits".
- Lovers of Verona, a French import.
- Manon, a French import; the Legion said it "condones immoral actions".
- No Orchids for Miss Blandish, a British gangster film.
- Oh, Amelia, a French import.
- The Paris Waltz, a French import.
- A Royal Affair, a French import starring Maurice Chevalier.
- Scandals of Clochemerle, a French import.
- The Sinners, a French import directed by Julien Duvivier.
- Los Olvidados (also known as The Young and the Damned), a Mexican film directed by Luis Buñuel.

== 1951 ==
- Behind Closed Shutters, an Italian import.
- It's Forever Springtime, an Italian import.
- Latuko, a sexploitation film in the form of an anthropological pseudo-documentary about a tribe in Sudan better known as the Lotuko people.
- A Lover's Return, a French import.
- La Marie du port, a French import starring Jean Gabin.
- Miss Julie, a Swedish import.
- Paris Nights, a French import.
- The Raven (1943), a French import. (Note: Likely the 1943 French film.)
- La Ronde, a French import directed by Max Ophüls starring Simone Signoret.
- Scarred, an Italian import starring Anna Magnani.
- She Shoulda Said No!, a film about the dangers of marijuana.
- The Ways of Love, the umbrella title used for distributing three foreign language films, which the Legion condemned as a group. The principal film, both in length and in terms of the controversy it generated, was Roberto Rossellini's The Miracle (1948), distributed in Europe as L'Amore with a companion film, The Human Voice, also by Rossellini. The two other short films that The Ways of Love included were Jean Renoir's "A Day in the Country" (1936) and Marcel Pagnol's Jofroi (1933).
- White Cargo (1937), a French film. Listed by the Legion of Decency as French White Cargo.

== 1952 ==
- Cocaine: The Thrill That Kills (a.k.a. Letter at Dawn), an Italian import.
- Of Love and Bandits, an Italian import.
- Savage Triangle, a French import.
- The Strollers, a French import.
- Women Without Names, an Italian import.

== 1953 ==
- Girls Marked Danger, an Italian import.
- The Moon Is Blue, an Otto Preminger comedy for United Artists. Denied Production Code approval as well.
- Le Plaisir, a French anthology film import directed by Max Ophüls.
- The Seven Deadly Sins, a French–Italian production.
- Three Forbidden Stories, an Italian import.
- Times Gone By, an Italian import.

== 1954 ==
- The Bed, a French import.
- The French Line, an RKO musical starring Jane Russell, condemned for "grossly obscene, suggestive and indecent action, costuming and dialogue". The Legion said it was "capable of grave, evil influence upon those who patronize it, especially youth".
- Garden of Eden, a sexploitation film set in a nudist colony.
- Karamoja, a sexploitation film.
- Mademoiselle Gobete, an Italian import that the Legion said "dwells constantly on a farcical presentation of the virtue of purity".
- One Summer of Happiness, a Swedish import.
- Sensualità, an Italian import starring Marcello Mastroianni.
- Summer Interlude, a Swedish import directed by Ingmar Bergman. Condemned under the title Illicit Interlude.
- Violated, a U.S. crime drama.
- We Want a Child!, a Danish import.

== 1955 ==
- Adorable Creatures, a French import.
- The Desperate Women, a Majestic Pictures film; the Legion said that "it ignores completely essential and supernatural values associated with questions of this nature".
- A Husband for Anna, an Italian import.
- I Am a Camera, a British import the Legion condemned for its "basic story, characterization, dialogue and costuming".
- The Game of Love, a French import.
- Rififi, a French import, initially condemned; assigned a B after "substantial revisions".
- Son of Sinbad, RKO film described as "a challenge to decent standards of theatrical entertainment" and "an incitement to juvenile delinquency".

== 1956 ==
- And God Created Woman, a French import directed by Roger Vadim and starring Brigitte Bardot.
- Baby Doll, produced by Elia Kazan and Tennessee Williams; the Legion called its subject matter "morally repellent both in theme and treatment" and said its "scenes of cruelty are degrading and corruptive".
- Bed of Grass, a Greek import the Legion charged with "sheer animalism", originally titled Agioupa, to koritsi tou kampou.
- Female and the Flesh, also released as The Light Across the Street; a French import.
- Fruits of Summer, a French import.
- Letters from My Windmill, a French import directed by Marcel Pagnol.
- The Miller's Beautiful Wife, an Italian import.
- Passionate Summer, a French–Italian import.
- Rossana, a Mexican import. (Note: The Legion's 1959 listing misidentifies this film as Italian.)
- The Naked Night, a Swedish import directed by Ingmar Bergman, also distributed as Sawdust and Tinsel.
- Sins of the Borgias, a French import.
- Stella, a Greek import starring Melina Mercouri.
- Stain in the Snow, a French import the Legion called Snow was Black.
- Nana, a French import.
- Woman of Rome, an Italian import.

== 1957 ==
- The Flesh Is Weak (1957), a British import.
- Mademoiselle Striptease (1956), a French import also distributed as Please! Mr. Balzac.
- Maid in Paris (1956), a French import.
- Mitsou (1956), a French import.
- The Night Heaven Fell, a French import.
- Smiles of a Summer Night (1955), a Swedish import from Ingmar Bergman; condemned for "unmitigated emphasis on illicit loves and sensuality".
- Untamed Youth (1957) (Note: The Legion says a revised version of this film was rated B but does not mention an earlier rating, presumably C.)

== 1958 ==
- Heroes and Sinners (1955), a French import.
- Lady Chatterley's Lover (1955), a French import starring Danielle Darrieux.
- Liane, Jungle Goddess (1956), a German import.
- Love Is My Profession (1958), a French import.
- Lovers of Paris (1957), a French import, originally Pot-Bouille and based on the Zola novel of that name.
- A Question of Adultery (1958), a British drama condemned for justifying artificial insemination.

== 1959 ==
- The Third Sex (1957), a German import directed by Veit Harlan; also known as Bewildered Youth or Different from You and Me, originally Das dritte Geschlecht.
- The Savage Eye (1959), Los Angeles dramatized documentary.

== 1960 ==
- Breathless, French import directed by Jean-Luc Godard.
- Never on Sunday, Greek import directed by Jules Dassin.
- Oscar Wilde, a British import starring Robert Morley.
- The Trials of Oscar Wilde, a British import starring Peter Finch.

== 1961 ==
- L'Avventura, Antonioni's 1960 Italian film was deemed "totally unacceptable", "grossly suggestive and pornographic in intent". The Legion said that "the theme of this film is developed in an atmosphere of complete moral ambiguity".
- A Cold Wind in August
- Jules and Jim
- Viridiana The Vatican protested when this film shared the grand prize at the Cannes Film Festival.

== 1962 ==
- Boccaccio '70 The Legion objected to its "grossly suggestive concentration upon indecent costuming, situations and dialogue". By this time the Legion had adopted a policy of not reconsidering a film's rating once it was widely distributed, even if revised, but in this case the Legion allowed that the film's C rating would not be valid once the film was edited for television broadcast.

== 1963 ==
- 8½, Italian import directed by Federico Fellini.
- Contempt (Le Mépris), French-Italian import directed by Jean-Luc Godard

== 1964 ==
- Kiss Me, Stupid, produced and directed by Billy Wilder.
- Of Human Bondage

== 1965 ==
- The Pawnbroker, condemned "for the sole reason that nudity has been used".

== 1966 ==
- Blowup, Michelangelo Antonioni's first English language film. One of the known films that would eliminate the Hays Office Code in favor of the MPAA rating system in 1968. It was condemned for its explicit sexual content.

== 1967 ==
- Beach Red
- Hurry Sundown
- The Penthouse
- Reflections in a Golden Eye
- Valley of the Dolls

== 1968 ==
- Barbarella, condemned for the main reason nudity is used. It was later edited to earn the PG rating by removing such obscene content in the 1970s.
- Birds in Peru, a French film starring Jean Seberg
- If He Hollers, Let Him Go!
- The Magus
- Rosemary's Baby, a horror film with depicted Satanism.
- Weekend, a French import directed by Jean-Luc Godard

== 1969 ==
- The April Fools
- Bob & Carol & Ted & Alice
- I Am Curious (Yellow)
- The Killing of Sister George
- Marlowe

== 1971 ==
- Billy Jack
- A Clockwork Orange
- The Devils
- The Last Picture Show, a coming-of-age drama film in an early 1950s setting with excessive sexual content.

== 1972 ==
- The Carey Treatment
- Pink Flamingos, a black comedy film condemned for its explicit content before it received the NC-17 rating later in 1997. It was banned in several countries because of it.

== 1973 ==
- High Plains Drifter
- Last Tango in Paris, an erotic drama film condemned by the Legion for its raunchy nature.
- Lemora, A Child's Tale of the Supernatural, deemed notorious for its consideration of anti-Catholicism.
- The Wicker Man

== 1975 ==
- The Rocky Horror Picture Show, a musical comedy horror film with LGBT themes and sexuality.

== 1976 ==
- Carrie, a supernatural horror film based on Stephen King’s novel that was deemed obscene and religiously insensitive.
- J. D.'s Revenge
- The Omen, a supernatural horror film condemned by the Legion for misrepresenting Christian eschatology.
- The Outlaw Josey Wales
- Taxi Driver

== 1978 ==
- Dawn of the Dead
- Ice Castles, one of the last few films condemned by the Legion for the use of foul language and abuse.
- Pretty Baby, one of the last few films condemned by the Legion due to child pornography concerns.
- Same Time, Next Year

== See also ==
- Motion Picture Production Code
- Motion Picture Association of America film rating system
