= Confessions of a Vice Baron =

1943 Americandrama film

- Directed by: S. Roy Luby; William A. O'Connor; Melville Shyer; Herman E. Webber
- Written by: Marion Candler (writer); Willis Kent (writer); Harvey F. Thew (writer)
- Produced by: Willis Kent (producer)
- Starring: See below
- Cinematography: Robert E. Cline; Harvey Gould; Jack Greenhalgh; Marcel Le Picard
- Release date: 1943
- Running time: 59 minutes
- Country: United States
- Language: English

Confessions of a Vice Baron is a 1943 American crime film directed by S. Roy Luby, William A. O'Connor, Melville Shyer, and Herman E. Webber. The film was created using edited footage for the flashback scenes from Mad Youth (1940), The Wages of Sin (1938), Smashing the Vice Trust (1937), Race Suicide (1937), and The Pace That Kills (1935). Willy Castello appeared in each of these films except for The Pace That Kills.

The film is also known as Skid Row (American reissue title).

== Plot summary ==
Notorious mob boss James "Lucky" Lombardi looks back upon his life and career on the night of his execution.

The flashbacks picks up when Lucky, born and raised on the Balkan Peninsula, tries to marry into money and goes to the U.S. to find himself a wealthy bride. He has no luck, despite his name, and instead makes an attempt to bluff his way forward, pretending to be Count de Kloven, a rich aristocrat.

As De Kloven, Lucky gets hired to escort the prominent socialite Mrs. Lucy Morgan, but quits when she wants him to be her lover. Instead he tries a new disguise, as Rudolph Von Hertsen, and gets involved in another racket with a Dr. J.M. Randall, performing abortions and selling unwanted babies.

When the racket is disclosed, Lucky moves on to the business of pimping young women into prostitution. He goes as far as to trick naive young women into laying their lives in his hands, selling them as sex-slaves, thus entering into the business of white slavery. He soon becomes the head of such an organization.

His right-arm man, Nick goes to lengths to get new merchandise for the business, and kidnaps Dorothy, a young, blonde schoolgirl. The election of a new ambitious district attorney causes Lucky problems, but he refuses to slow down.

Lucky falls in love with a beautiful woman named Lois, but his affections are not returned, and she has to run for her life from his long lawless arms, with the help of one of Lucky's more goodhearted men, Harry. When Lucky discovers what Harry has done he has him killed, and is ultimately arrested and convicted of murder. The new district attorney manages to get him sentenced to death.

We return from the flashbacks to present time, where Lucky has learned his lesson: that crime doesn't pay.

== Cast ==
- Willy Castello as Lucky Lombardi aka Count de Hoven / Van Hersten / Kilonis
- Lloyd Ingraham as J.M. Randall, alias Dr. Havens (edited from Race Suicide) (archive footage)
- Lona Andre as Florence Davis (edited from Race Suicide) (archive footage) (uncredited)
- Dean Benton as Harry, a young henchman (edited from Smashing the Vice Trust) (archive footage) (uncredited)
- Betty Compson as Mrs. Lucy Morgan (edited from Mad Youth) (archive footage) (uncredited)
- Lester Dorr as Eddie's henchman (edited from Smashing the Vice Trust) (archive footage) (uncredited)
- Sam Flint as Martin Standish, gang lawyer (edited from Smashing the Vice Trust) (archive footage) (uncredited)
- Selmer Jackson as The District Attorney (edited from Smashing the Vice Trust) (archive footage) (uncredited)
- Donald Kerr as Man at Party House (archive footage) (uncredited)
- Noel Madison as Nick, Procurer at Nightclub (edited from The Pace That Kills) (archive footage) (uncredited)
- Veola Vonn as Lois, the nice girl (edited from Smashing the Vice Trust) (archive footage) (uncredited)
- Constance Worth as Judy (edited from Wages of Sin) (archive footage) (uncredited)
- Carleton Young as Bruce, Judy's date (edited from Wages of Sin) (archive footage) (uncredited)
- Clara Kimball Young as Fat Pearl (edited from Wages of Sin) (archive footage) (uncredited)

== Soundtrack ==
- Nona Lee - "All I Want Is You" (in footage from The Pace That Kills)
