= The Wages of Sin (1938 film) =

- Theatrical poster
- Directed by: Herman E. Webber
- Screenplay by: Willis Kent
- Produced by: Willis Kent
- Starring: Constance Worth; Willy Castello; Clara Kimball Young; Blanche Mehaffey
- Cinematography: Harvey Gould
- Edited by: Robert Jahns
- Production company: Willis Kent Productions
- Release date: July 14, 1938
- Running time: 77 minutes
- Country: United States
- Language: English

The Wages of Sin is a 1938 American drama film directed by Herman Webber and starring Constance Worth, Willy Castello, Clara Kimball Young, and Blanche Mehaffey. It was produced by Willis Kent. Cheaply made, with poor production values, it is an exploitation film made outside the Hollywood production code, dealing with topics of white slavery, prostitution and murder.

== Plot ==
The film begins with a long subtitled introduction, stating 90,000 women in the US go missing annually and suggesting many are forced by circumstances to join the "Sisterhood of Sorrow".

Marjorie Benton, who is "just a kid," dreams of an office job, but works at the Pacific Laundry and is the only breadwinner for a family of coarsely-spoken strikers and loafers. She finally goes on a night out with Florence, one of the other laundry workers, to a seedy nightclub. At the nightclub they watch some impromptu acts and Marjorie drinks alcohol and tries marijuana, which Florence does not approve of. The girls catch the eye of Tony Kilonis who insists on driving them back to Florence's. Tony warns Florence not to say anything about his reputation to Marjorie.

Having been thrown out of home by her family for staying out, and Tony having secretly arranged for Marjorie to be sacked, Tony charms Marjorie and lures her into living with him in a stylish apartment, with promises of marriage and lavish lifestyle. After a few months, he tells her he wants her to entertain a gentleman at a hotel "for money". Marjorie is initially shocked. In an unusual close up shot on Tony's face, straight to camera, he threatens her and she complies. Marjorie works as a regular call girl at a hotel until exposed when she steals from a customer.

Tony then offers her a "long vacation" up the coast. This turns out to be at a brothel, run by madam Pearl. When Marjorie refuses to work, she is locked in her room. Tearfully, she explains to another prostitute, Roxy, that she is pregnant. If only she could tell Tony. Roxy helps her to escape. Making her way back to the city, she returns to Tony's apartment but discovers him seducing another woman with exactly the same lines he once used on her. In despair, Marjorie shoots them both. A final courtroom and jury scene completes the film—however the question of Marjorie's guilt is left unresolved. A title offers cinema goers cash prizes for the best written verdict sent in.

== Cast ==
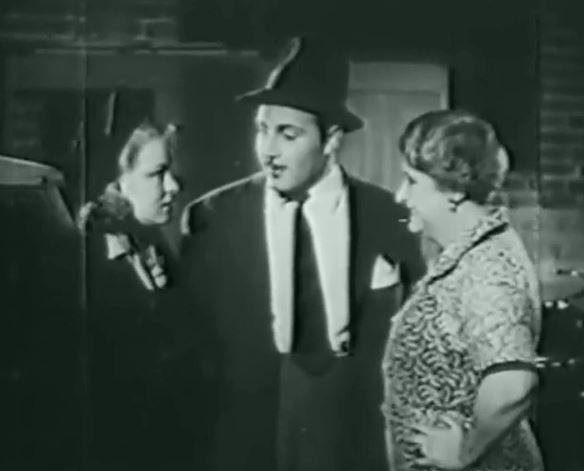
Marjorie (Constance Worth) is introduced to Pearl (Clara Kimball Young) by Tony (Willy Castello)

- Constance Worth as Marjorie Benton
- Willy Castello as Tony Kilonis
- Blanche Mehaffey as Florence Jones
- Clara Kimball Young as Pearl
- Paula Bromleigh as Roxy

In the lengthy nightclub scene, Jan Duggan sings "The Seashell Song", which she first sang in the 1934 W. C. Fields film The Old Fashioned Way. Burlesque dancer Rose La Rose performs a partial striptease, until interrupted by an angry boyfriend who covers her with a table cloth. (She appears in the same clothes and in front of an identical bar room set up in Rose la Rose, Tops in Any League, a short stag film.)

== Production ==
Willis Kent's main film production output was B-westerns. However, he also made a number of exploitation films, including The Pace That Kills (1935), Smashing the Vice Trust (1937), Race Suicide (1938), and Mad Youth (1940). Jeremy Geltzer suggests that like fellow exploitation filmmaker Dwain Esper, Willis Kent was able to avoid censorship by not submitting his films for censorship classification. Advance publicity was avoided because exploitation films were quickly and cheaply made, and like Esper, Kent handled his own distribution and exhibition to independent cinemas. Film screenings would be therefore often be over before municipal authorities could react.

Eric Schaefer notes two typical features of exploitation films, also found in The Wages of Sin. To expand the film to a marketable length, exploitation filmmakers like Kent used "padding," often setting the main characters in a nightclub, which became an excuse for a series of acts. Cut-aways at frequent intervals would show "the story characters sitting at a table rapturously enjoying themselves". In addition, Kent's films usually began with a "square-up", a statement at the beginning of the film justifying itself as a dramatic exposé of one of society's problems.

Performers on exploitation films were not on ongoing contracts. Leading actress Constance Worth had lost her RKO contract in 1937, and had been through a messy divorce from actor George Brent. Married for ten days in May 1937, their divorce was not finalized until December 1937. Accounts of the drawn out divorce dominated US and Australian newspapers for months.

== Reception ==
The film was never released in Australia, where Jocelyn Howarth (Constance Worth) had been an up-and-coming stage and screen actress in the early 1930s. Lon Jones, a Hollywood-based journalist writing for The Sydney Morning Herald commented that "it is a story of white slavery, and is very sordid. Constance does a fair job of acting in the picture but I doubt...(it) will help her career. She would have been wise to stay out of such a picture."

In 1943, Willis Kent used sections of this film and his other exploitation films for Confessions of a Vice Baron. In it, Willy Castello's character, about to be executed, reviews his life of crime. This is the device used to include some of the most salacious scenes from the Willis Kent Studio exploitation films.

== Preservation ==
The Wages of Sin was preserved and restored by the UCLA Film & Television Archive from the 35mm nitrate original picture negative and a 35mm safety print. Restoration funding was provided by David Stenn. The restoration had its world premiere at the 2024 UCLA Festival of Preservation.
