= Of Human Bondage (disambiguation) =

Of Human Bondage is a novel by W. Somerset Maugham published in 1915.

Of Human Bondage may also refer to adaptations of this book:

- Of Human Bondage (1934 film), starring Leslie Howard and Bette Davis
- Of Human Bondage (1946 film), starring Paul Henreid and Eleanor Parker
- Of Human Bondage (1964 film), starring Kim Novak and Laurence Harvey
- Of Human Bondage (Studio One), a 1949 episode of the anthology TV series Studio One
