= National Legion of Decency =

Defunct American moral pressure group

- Successor: National Catholic Office for Motion Pictures (NCOMP)
- Formation: 1934; 92 years ago
- Founder: John T. McNicholas
- Dissolved: 1965; 61 years ago
- Type: Catholic organization

The National Legion of Decency, also known as the Catholic Legion of Decency, was an American Catholic group founded in 1934 by the Archbishop of Cincinnati, John T. McNicholas, as an organization dedicated to identifying objectionable content in motion pictures on behalf of Catholic audiences. Members were asked to pledge to patronize only those motion pictures which did not "offend decency and Christian morality". The concept soon gained support from other churches.

Condemnation by the Legion would often diminish a film's chances for success because it meant the population of Catholics, some twenty million strong at the time (plus their Protestant allies), would avoid attending any screening of the film. The efforts to help parishioners avoid films with objectionable content sometimes backfired when it was found that they helped draw attention to those films. Although the Legion was often envisioned as a bureaucratic arm of the Catholic Church, it instead was little more than a loose confederation of local organizations, with each diocese appointing a local Legion director, usually a parish priest, who was responsible for Legion activities in that diocese. Film historian Bernard F. Dick wrote: "Although the Legion was never officially an organ of the Catholic Church, and its movie ratings were nonbinding, many Catholics were still guided by the Legion's classifications."

In 1965, the National Legion of Decency was reorganized as the National Catholic Office for Motion Pictures (NCOMP). In 1980, NCOMP ceased operations, along with the biweekly Review, which by then had published ratings for 16,251 feature films.

== Background ==
From the early days of cinema, the motion picture industry made several attempts to self-regulate the content of films to avoid the creation of numerous state and municipal censorship boards. Most of these efforts were relatively ineffectual.

=== National Board of Review ===
On December 24, 1908, New York City Mayor George B. McClellan Jr. revoked all moving-picture exhibition licenses in the city pending inspection of the premises due to fire safety concerns regarding the highly flammable celluloid film. He stated that due to complaints from the city's clergy and the Society for the Prevention of Cruelty to Children, upon re-issuance, the licensees were prohibited from operating on Sunday. He further indicated his intention to revoke the license of any motion picture show "...on evidence that pictures have been exhibited by the licensees which tend to degrade or injure the morals of the community."

In 1909, Charles Sprague Smith and about a dozen prominent individuals from the fields of social work, religion, and education, formed a committee, under the auspices of the People's Institute at Cooper Union, to make recommendations to the Mayor's office concerning controversial films. Initially called the New York Board of Motion Picture Censorship it soon became known as the National Board of Motion Picture Censorship. To avoid government censorship of films, the National Board became the unofficial clearinghouse for new movies. The Board's stated purpose was to endorse films of merit and champion the new "art of the people". In March 1916 the Board changed its name to the National Board of Review of Motion Pictures to avoid the controversial word "censorship".

=== National Association of the Motion Picture Industry (NAMPI) ===
The National Association of the Motion Picture Industry was an industry self-regulatory body created by the Hollywood studios in 1916 to answer demands for film censorship by states and municipalities. The Association devised "Thirteen Points", a list of subjects and storylines they promised to avoid. However, there was no method of enforcement if a studio film violated the Thirteen Points content restrictions, and NAMPI proved ineffective.

=== Motion Picture Producers and Distributors of America (MPPDA) ===
After several risqué films and a series of notorious off-screen scandals involving Hollywood stars, political pressure was increasing, with legislators in 37 states introducing almost one hundred movie censorship bills in 1921. Faced with the prospect of having to comply with hundreds, and potentially thousands, of inconsistent and easily changed decency laws to show their movies, the studios chose self-regulation as the preferable option. In 1922, the Motion Picture Producers and Distributors of America (MPPDA) was formed. Will H. Hays was named the association's first president. The goal of the organization was to rehabilitate the image of the movie industry in the wake of the Arbuckle scandal and amid growing calls by primarily Protestant groups for federal censorship of the movies. "Hiring Hays to “clean up the pictures” was, at least in part, a public relations ploy, and much was made of his conservative credentials, including his roles as a Presbyterian deacon and past chairman of the Republican Party."

In 1924, Hays instituted "The Formula", a loose set of guidelines for filmmakers, to get the movie industry to self-regulate the issues that the censorship boards had been created to address. "The Formula" requested that studios send synopses of films being considered to the MPPDA for review. This effort largely failed, however, as studios were under no obligation to send their scripts to Hays's office, nor to follow his recommendations.

In 1927, Hays oversaw the creation of a code of "Don'ts and Be Carefuls" for the industry. This list outlined the issues that movies could encounter in different localities. Again, despite Hays' efforts, studios largely ignored the "Don'ts and Be Carefuls," and by the end of 1929, the MPPDA received only about 20 percent of Hollywood scripts before production, and the number of regional and local censorship boards continued to increase. However, a number of the items listed would become part of the later Code.

==== The Production Code ====
Martin J. Quigley was publisher of Exhibitors Herald-World (a trade magazine for independent exhibitors). Daniel A. Lord was a Jesuit priest who had served as one of the technical consultants on Cecil B. DeMille's 1927 The King of Kings. Quigley drafted Lord to write a code for motion pictures. With the blessing of Cardinal George W. Mundelein of Chicago, Father Lord authored the code, which later became known as "The Production Code", "The Code", and "The Hays Code". It was presented to Will Hays in 1930 and privately circulated by the MPPDA.

The studio heads were less than enthusiastic but after some revisions, agreed to make The Code the rule of the industry, albeit with many loopholes that allowed studio producers to override the Hays Office's application of it. One main reason in adopting the Code was to avoid direct government intervention. Tasked with enforcing the code was the Studio Relations Committee, which very soon was overwhelmed by the number of films to view. The committee had a small staff and not much influence. Without the power to compel the editing of content deemed problematic, it was left with attempting to persuade the studios to make changes. From 1930 to 1934, the Production Code was only slightly effective in fighting back calls for federal censorship. The SRC was considered generally ineffective. Lord considered the code a failure.

== History ==
Catholic bishops and laypeople tended to be leery of federal censorship and favored the Hays approach of self-censorship, and the influence of public opinion. The Catholic Legion of Decency was organized in 1934 under the auspices of Cincinnati Archbishop John T. McNicholas. Members were asked to sign a pledge promising to "remain away from all motion pictures except those which do not offend decency and Christian morality." The idea soon caught on with other churches. The Episcopal magazine The Living Church printed the pledge for its readers to sign. It was also promoted by the Protestant Detroit Council of Churches. As its influence spread, the organization adopted the name National Legion of Decency (NLD).

Initially, the Legion of Decency provided no official guide to good and bad films but left it up to individual priests and bishops to determine what was or was not morally acceptable. Some Catholics proposed announcing only lists of films approved for viewing so as not to publicize the names of films judged unsuitable. The Diocese of Brooklyn used a list drawn up by the Federation of Catholic Alumnae.

During the early years, the Legion established a rating system that assessed films based on their moral content. The films were graded on a scale from "A" to "C," with “A” being morally permissible and “C” being morally unacceptable, or, "condemned." One of the first foreign films condemned was the 1933 Czechoslovak erotic romantic drama Ecstasy which featured an eighteen-year-old Hedy Lamarr swimming nude and chasing naked after her runaway horse, as well as an illicit affair and a suicide. This was not a particularly difficult decision. After a Vatican journalist attended a screening at the Venice Film Festival, Pope Pius XI denounced it in the Vatican newspaper. Criticized by women's groups, it was also banned by the Pennsylvania state censor.

The Legion also published and distributed pamphlets and fliers encouraging Catholics not to view certain films it viewed as immoral. The Legion was often more conservative in its views on films than the Motion Picture Association of America's Production Code. The early thirties saw a number of exploitation film features that claimed to warn the public about various kinds of shocking sin and depravity corrupting society. These films featured lurid, taboo subjects, such as: drug abuse, promiscuous sex, venereal disease, polygamy, child marriages, etc. Some included brief nude scenes. One such film condemned by the Legion was 1935's The Pace That Kills, which dealt with cocaine addiction, amorality and prostitution.

For the first few decades, the Legion had a significant influence on the entertainment industry. Their influence stemmed from the popularity of their rating system, their skillful lobbying, and the circulation of a pledge at church services. From the 1930s through the 1960s, Catholic parishes in dioceses across the country administered yearly pledges in which millions of Catholics throughout the U.S. vowed to refuse to watch films that were condemned by the Legion. "Although the Legion was never officially an organ of the Catholic Church, and its movie ratings were nonbinding, many Catholics were still guided by the Legion's classifications."

With the Legion of Decency rating films independently, and pressure on the industry from several Protestant and women's groups, Hays, who had been in charge of enforcing the voluntary code since 1927, worried that the NLD's efforts could weaken his power and that of his office and hurt industry profits. Several states continued to have state censors, and the Archdiocese of Chicago maintained its own list of film ratings. The MPPDA created a new department, the Production Code Administration (PCA), to administer the Motion Picture Production Code. Hays appointed conservative Catholic Joseph Breen to head it.

In 1957, Pope Pius XII issued the encyclical Miranda Prorsus ("The Remarkable Inventions"), which suggested that Catholics should be more concerned about encouraging good movies than condemning bad ones, an approach taken earlier by the National Board of Review. The Legion revised its ratings process, increased the members of its ratings panel with individuals knowledgeable in film and communication arts, and added two new ratings categories: A-III, for adults only, and A-IV, for adults with reservations.

Professor James Skinner wrote that by the late 1950s and early to mid-1960s, the Legion was beginning to lose its influence both within Hollywood and within the Catholic Church. Skinner noted that in some cases, young Catholics throughout the country saw a “C” rating as a reason to see a particular film. He argued that as a result of the Church’s liberalization after the Second Vatican Council, and a decline in the initial enthusiasm for the Legion, the Legion ceased to exist by the mid 1960s. In 1965, the Legion was restructured as the National Catholic Office for Motion Pictures (NCOMP), but scholars such as Skinner argue that the NCOMP failed to exert as much influence over Hollywood as the Legion.

== Rating system ==
The original ratings of:

- A: Morally unobjectionable,
- B: Morally objectionable in part, and
- C: Condemned

were subsequently expanded by separating "A" into:

- A-I, for general patronage, and
- A-II, for adults and adolescents only, to distinguish films suitable for children from those more appropriate for older viewers.

Additional categories of A-III, for adults only, and A-IV, for adults with reservations were later added.

The Legion of Decency condemned several films for morally offensive content. This was reflected in a "C" rating. Practicing Catholics were directed to refrain from viewing such films. More explicitly, they were directed to "remain away from all motion pictures except those which do not offend decency and Christian morality."

Most motion pictures receiving a "C" rating were foreign films. Since it reviewed films when released for distribution, the Legion usually rated non-U.S. films a few years after their first release in their country of origin, occasionally years after. One such film was Jean Renoir's 1938 La Bête Humaine about a homicidal alcoholic. Frank S. Nugent, film critic for The New York Times, said even though he gave the film a positive review, he felt uncomfortable watching it. "It is hardly a pretty picture, dealing as it does with a man whose tainted blood subjects him to fits of homicidal mania,... Sitting here, a safe distance from it, we are not at all sure we entirely approve of it or its telling."

Sometimes the Hollywood studios would work with the Legion to avoid a "C" rating that might harm a film's distribution and profitability. Metro-Goldwyn-Mayer made revisions to the 1940 Strange Cargo and the Legion changed its rating to "unobjectionable for adults". Columbia Pictures removed fifteen lines of dialogue from This Thing Called Love and the Legion revised the rating to "B". (The film was banned in Ireland, Australia, and British Columbia).

By the late fifties, films considered "problematic" were viewed by the Legion two or three times; first by the staff and then by consultants who provided written evaluations. Invariably, the Legion was considered too liberal by some, and too cautious by others.

The C rating was issued from 1933 until the end of 1981. On January 1, 1982, the B and C ratings were combined into a new O rating for "morally offensive" films, and NCOMP began to reassign ratings to some older films based on its new system.

== Pledge ==
The pledge was revised in 1934:

I condemn all indecent and immoral motion pictures, and those which glorify crime or criminals. I promise to do all that I can to strengthen public opinion against the production of indecent and immoral films, and to unite with all who protest against them. I acknowledge my obligation to form a right conscience about pictures that are dangerous to my moral life. I pledge myself to remain away from them. I promise, further, to stay away altogether from places of amusement which show them as a matter of policy.

In 1938, the league requested that the Pledge of the Legion of Decency be administered each year on the Feast of the Immaculate Conception (December 8).

== United States Conference of Catholic Bishops' Office for Film and Broadcasting ==
United States Conference of Catholic Bishops' Office for Film and Broadcasting was an office of the United States Conference of Catholic Bishops and is best known for the USCCB film rating, a continuation of the National Legion of Decency rating system begun in 1933 by Archbishop of Cincinnati John T. McNicholas, OP.

After the National Catholic Office of Motion Pictures was re-established in 1960, it later became the Office of Film and Broadcasting (OFB). The Office of Film and Broadcasting merged with the National Catholic Office for Radio and Television in 1980. Together they reviewed motion pictures, radio, and television using the same rating scale the original Legion of Decency did in the 1930s and 1940s. They shared the same goal, which was to rid the screen of stories that lowered traditional moral standards and persuaded people, especially young people to accept false principles of conduct. By 1990 the National Catholic Office for Radio and Television collapsed leaving the Office of Film and Broadcasting to review strictly motion pictures. The Office of Film and Broadcasting worked to review every movie in the United States still adhering to the original rating system.

The organization had been run by the United States Catholic Conference in their Communications Department but was later joined with the National Conference of Catholic Bishops and renamed the United States Conference of Catholic Bishops in 2001. The Office of Film and Broadcasting carried the same film rating system as the Legion of Decency. The rating "A" meant morally unobjectionable but falling into the subcategories of AI: Suitable for all audiences, AII: Suitable for adults and adolescents, and AIII: Suitable for adults only. The next ratings were "B", which meant morally objectionable in part, and "C", which meant it was condemned by the Legion of Decency. The Office of Motion Pictures began with the intention to rate every motion picture made in the United States and labored for 45 years.

=== Ratings retreat ===
In the 1970s, controversies grew surrounding the intense rating system and inconsistent reviews. Examples of films which received the A-IV rating include The Exorcist and Saturday Night Fever, two films whose content was seen by many as being exaggerated by the mainstream press, perhaps leading to the wrong interpretations and false conclusions cited in the rating's full description. In 1995, the description was changed to films "which are not morally offensive in themselves but are not for casual viewing”. Ultimately, the Office of Film and Broadcasting shut down in 2010. The USCCB continued to voluntarily provide information and film ratings for Catholics through the Catholic News Service. The Catholic News Service also gave access to archived reviews dating from 2011 and prior.

==== Discontinuation ====
On 4 May 2022, Catholic News Service announced that it would cease its operations in the United States on 31 December 2022 due to a decision of the USCCB. The news agency's domestic distribution platform and archives were acquired by Our Sunday Visitor and used to launch the new OSV News.

== See also ==
- List of films condemned by the Legion of Decency
- Hays Code – a secular American censorship code in effect during much of the same period
- Payne Fund Studies - early studies on the effects of movies on the behavior of children and adolescents.
- Protestant Film Commission
- Religious censorship
