= Paul Yawitz =

American journalist

- Born: February 15, 1900; St. Louis, Missouri, United States
- Died: June 10, 1983 (aged 83); Oklahoma City, Oklahoma; United States
- Occupation: Screenwriter
- Years active: 1937–1957 (film)

Paul Yawitz (1900–1983) was an American journalist and screenwriter.

== Selected filmography ==
- Saturday's Heroes (1937)
- They Wanted to Marry (1937)
- The Affairs of Annabel (1938)
- Little Accident (1939)
- Honolulu Lu (1941)
- She Has What It Takes (1943)
- Louisiana Hayride (1944)
- The Racket Man (1944)
- The Falcon's Alibi (1946)
- Unmasked (1950)
- Walk Softly, Stranger (1950)
- That Kind of Girl (1952)
- The Black Scorpion (1957)

== Bibliography ==
- Blottner, Gene. Columbia Pictures Movie Series, 1926-1955: The Harry Cohn Years. McFarland, 2011.
