= Drums of the Desert (1940 film) =

1940 film by George Waggner

- Theatrical release poster
- Directed by: George Waggner
- Screenplay by: Dorothy Davenport; George Waggner
- Story by: John T. Neville
- Produced by: Paul Malvern
- Starring: Ralph Byrd; Lorna Gray; Mantan Moreland; George Lynn; Willy Castello; Jean Del Val
- Cinematography: Fred Jackman Jr.
- Edited by: Jack Ogilvie
- Production company: Monogram Pictures
- Distributed by: Monogram Pictures
- Release date: October 7, 1940
- Running time: 64 minutes
- Country: United States
- Language: English

Drums of the Desert is a 1940 American romantic adventure film directed by George Waggner and written by Dorothy Davenport and George Waggner. The film stars Ralph Byrd, Lorna Gray, Mantan Moreland, George Lynn, Willy Castello and Jean Del Val. The film was released on October 7, 1940, by Monogram Pictures.

== Plot ==
Prior to the Battle of France, French Foreign Legion Lt. Paul Dumont is sent to French North Africa. On board a liner crossing the Mediterranean, he meets and falls in love with Helene Laroche. However, an hour before their tryst the next morning, she leaves the ship to an unknown destination.

Arriving in Africa, Paul's mission is to train a demonstration platoon of Senegalese Tirailleurs to be military parachutists of the Armee d' Afrique). The platoon is led by Sgt. 'Blew' Williams, a former American from Harlem.

The two lovers meet again at a Legion fort when Lt. Dumont's platoon is to perform a demonstration of their parachute expertise for the Legion. Paul discovers Helene has arrived to wed his old friend and mentor Capt. Jean Bridaux. Also observing the parachutists is Ben Ali who uses his own initiative to attack the Legion outpost where one of the parachutists is killed and Jean is wounded. Ben Ali is caught attempting to murder the Captain in his tent and his apprehended.

Ali Ben's brother, Addullah, who has met both Paul and Helene on the same liner from France urgently tries to protect his brother, but Paul and Jean are adamant that Ben Ali lead the attack. Ben Ali is executed by a firing squad; Addulah vows revenge with an uprising to time with France's urgent military commitments on the Continent.

As Jean slowly recovers, he encourages Paul to befriend and guide Helene around the city, but the pair's love grows stronger. Paul becomes furious when Hassan, a fortune telling sand diviner predicts death and Paul and Jean loving each other. Paul can not betray his friend Jean, Helene confides in the Colonel Commandant's wife Madame Fouchet who says she will explain the matter to Jean.

Helene leaves a note for Paul to meet her at Hassan's local nightspot, where Helene accidentally discovers shipments of automatic weapons for Abddulah's insurgents; both she and Paul are captured and spirited away to an oasis that is the headquarters of the rebellion.

Sgt. Blue discovers Helene's note to Paul and visits the nightspot with several of his platoon and Jean. Using his straight razor, Blue extracts information of Paul and Helene's whereabouts from the occupant of the nightspot. Jean and Blue's platoon parachute into the oasis, rescue the lovers, revenge their dead comrade and wipe out the rebels.

== Cast ==
- Ralph Byrd as Lt. Paul Dumont
- Lorna Gray as Helene Laroche
- Mantan Moreland as Sgt. 'Blew' Williams
- George Lynn as Capt. Jean Bridaux
- Willy Castello as Addullah
- Jean Del Val as Col. Fouchet
- Ann Codee as Mrs. Fouchet
- Boyd Irwin as Capt. Andre
- Neyle Morrow as Ben Ali
- Alberto Morin as Hassan
- Jack Chefe as Steward
- Bud Harrison as Bobo
