= Spy Chasers =

1955 film by Edward Bernds

- Directed by: Edward Bernds
- Written by: Jerome S. Gottler (story and screenplay); Bert Lawrence (story and screenplay)
- Produced by: Ben Schwalb
- Starring: Leo Gorcey; Huntz Hall; David Gorcey; Bernard Gorcey; Leon Askin; Sig Ruman
- Cinematography: Harry Neumann
- Edited by: Lester A. Sansom
- Music by: Marlin Skiles
- Production company: Allied Artists Pictures
- Distributed by: Allied Artists Pictures
- Release date: July 31, 1955
- Running time: 61 minutes
- Country: United States
- Language: English

Spy Chasers is a 1955 American comedy film directed by Edward Bernds and starring the comedy team of The Bowery Boys. The film was released on July 31, 1955 by Allied Artists and is the thirty-eighth film in the series.

== Plot ==
Princess Ann of Truania arrives at Louie's Sweet Shop. She is the daughter of the exiled king and is looking for Louie, whose brother is a valuable assistance to the king back in Truania. They request the boys assistance to safeguard a half-coin for them. The other half will be delivered to them with a message when it is safe for the king to return to his country and regain control. The king's assistant, Colonel Baxis and Zelda, Ann's lady-in-waiting are traitors and are immediately distrusted by the boys. The traitor's intend to send a fake half-coin to the boys in order to get the king to return to his country too soon so that he can be arrested. Ann overhears the plot and is kidnapped. Eventually the boys rescue Ann and convince the king that his assistant is a traitor.

== Cast ==
=== The Bowery Boys ===
- Leo Gorcey as Terence Aloysius 'Slip' Mahoney
- Huntz Hall as Horace Debussy 'Sach' Jones
- David Gorcey as Charles 'Chuck' Anderson (Credited as David Condon)
- Bennie Bartlett as Butch Williams

=== Remaining cast ===
- Bernard Gorcey as Louie Dumbrowski
- Leon Askin as Colonel Alex Baxis
- Sig Ruman as King Rako of Truania
- Veola Vonn as Lady Zelda
- Lisa Davis as Princess Ann
- Richard Benedict as Boris
- Frank Richards as George

== Home media ==
Warner Archives released the film on made-to-order DVD in the United States as part of "The Bowery Boys, Volume Four" on August 26, 2014.

| Preceded by High Society; 1955 | 'The Bowery Boys' movies 1946-1958 | Succeeded by Jail Busters; 1955 |
