= Borrowed Hero =

1941 film by Lewis D. Collins

- Film poster
- Directed by: Lewis D. Collins
- Screenplay by: Earle Snell
- Story by: Ben Roberts; Sidney Sheldon
- Produced by: A.W. Hackel
- Starring: Alan Baxter; Florence Rice; Constance Worth
- Cinematography: Marcel Le Picard
- Edited by: Martin G. Cohn
- Music by: Frank Sanucci
- Production company: Supreme Pictures
- Distributed by: Monogram Pictures
- Release date: December 5, 1941
- Running time: 65 minutes
- Country: United States
- Language: English

Borrowed Hero is a 1941 American crime film directed by Lewis D. Collins and starring Alan Baxter, Florence Rice and Constance Worth. It was distributed by Monogram Pictures.

== Plot ==
A knowledgeable newspaper reporter helps a young prosecutor fight organized crime in a city.

== Cast ==
- Alan Baxter as Roger Andrews
- Florence Rice as Ann Thompson
- Constance Worth as Mona Brooks
- John Hamilton as William Brooks
- Mary Gordon as Mrs. Riley
- Marlo Dwyer as Carol Turner
- Stanley Andrews as Mr. Taylor, Defense Attorney
- Richard Terry as Dixie Nelson
- Jerry Marlowe as Johnny Gray
- Paul Everton as Trial Judge
- Guy Usher as District Attorney
- John Maxwell as City Editor
