= Windjammer (1937 film) =

1937 film by Ewing Scott

- Directed by: Ewing Scott
- Written by: James Gruen; Roul Haig (as Major Raoul Haig) (story); Daniel Jarrett (screenplay)
- Produced by: George A. Hirliman (producer); David Howard (associate producer)
- Starring: See below
- Cinematography: Frank B. Good
- Edited by: Robert O. Crandall
- Production company: George A. Hirliman Productions
- Distributed by: RKO Radio Pictures
- Release date: August 6, 1937
- Running time: 60 minutes
- Country: United States
- Language: English

Windjammer is a 1937 American adventure film directed by Ewing Scott.

== Plot ==
In San Francisco, Bruce Lane, a lawyer, has to serve a summons to a millionaire, Commodore Selby. The latter escapes on a yacht race to Honolulu.

== Cast ==
- George O'Brien as Bruce Lane
- Constance Worth as Betty Selby
- William Hall as Captain Morgan
- Brandon Evans as Commodore Russell P. Selby
- Gavin Gordon as J. Montague Forsythe
- Stanley Blystone as Peterson
- Lal Chand Mehra as Willy
- Ben Hendricks as Dolan
- Lee Shumway as Yacht Captain
- Frank Hagney as Slum
- Sam Flint as Marvin T. Bishop

Al Baffert, John Bagni, Jack Cheatham, Kernan Cripps, Lester Dorr, Jerry Frank, Al Herman, Warren Jackson, House Peters Jr., Marin Sais, Ted Stanhope and Florence Wix appear uncredited.

== Release ==
The film was released on August 6, 1937 in the United States.

== Critical reception ==
Harrison's Reports described the film as, "Just a fair program action-melodrama, less exciting than the usual George O'Brien pictures. The first half is slow; it is in the closing scenes where some thrills are concentrated."
