= This Thing Called Love (1940 film) =

- Directed by: Alexander Hall
- Written by: Ken Englund; George Seaton; P. J. Wolfson
- Based on: This Thing Called Love (play) by Edwin Burke
- Produced by: William Perlberg
- Starring: Rosalind Russell; Melvyn Douglas
- Cinematography: Joseph Walker
- Edited by: Viola Lawrence
- Music by: Werner R. Heymann
- Production company: Columbia Pictures
- Distributed by: Columbia Pictures
- Release dates: December 20, 1940 (Hollywood, California); January 2, 1941
- Running time: 98 minutes
- Country: United States
- Language: English

This Thing Called Love is a 1940 American romantic comedy film directed by Alexander Hall and starring Rosalind Russell and Melvyn Douglas as newlyweds with an odd arrangement: the wife insists on not sleeping together for a trial period. It is the second film adaptation of the play of the same name by Edwin Burke. The 1929 version, which shares the same title, is believed to be lost.

The film was condemned by the Catholic Legion of Decency as "contrary to the Christian concept of marriage".

== Plot ==
Ann Winters, an insurance company statistician made wary by her data, her sister's impending divorce and the messy divorce of their parents, tells her fiancé, Tice Collins, that after their marriage, there will be a three-month trial period before they consummate it so they can make sure that they are compatible. He thinks the idea is crazy, but she points out that they have known each other for a very short time. Harry Bertrand, his lawyer and friend, convinces him to pretend to go along, then use his charm to get her to change her mind.

== Cast ==
- Rosalind Russell as Ann Winters
- Melvyn Douglas as Tice Collins
- Binnie Barnes as Charlotte Campbell
- Allyn Joslyn as Harry Bertrand
- Gloria Dickson as Florence Bertrand
- Lee J. Cobb as Julio Diestro
- Gloria Holden as Genevieve Hooper
- Paul McGrath as Gordon Daniels
- Leona Maricle as Ruth Howland (as Leona Maride)
- Don Beddoe as Tom Howland
- Rosina Galli as Mrs. Diestro
- Sig Arno as Arno

== See also ==
- List of films condemned by the Legion of Decency
