= Willy Castello =

Dutch actor (1910–1953)

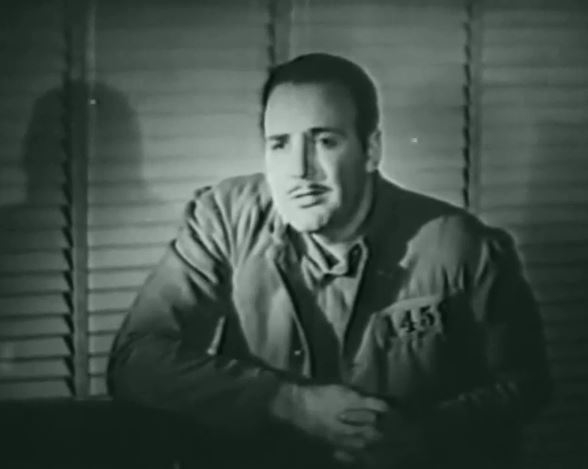
- Confessions of a Vice Baron (1943)
- Born: April 24, 1910; Amsterdam, Netherlands
- Died: February 7, 1953 (aged 42); Munich, West Germany
- Other name: William Castello
- Occupation: Actor
- Years active: 1927–1953 (film)

Willy Castello (April 24, 1910 – February 7, 1953) was a Dutch-American film actor, also sometimes credited as William Castello. While he spent much of his screen career playing supporting roles, he appeared for producer Willis Kent in several Poverty Row exploitation films.

== Selected filmography ==
- The Girl from Everywhere (1927)
- The King of Kings (1927)
- Border Romance (1929)
- Sailor's Song (1932)
- Abduct Me (1932)
- The Tars (1934)
- Three Kids and a Queen (1935)
- Melody Trail (1935)
- The Great Impersonation (1935)
- Smashing the Vice Trust (1937)
- Heroes of the Alamo (1937)
- Young Dynamite (1937)
- Special Agent K-7 (1937)
- The Wages of Sin (1938)
- Wanted by the Police (1938)
- Race Suicide (1938)
- The Port of Missing Girls (1938)
- Death Rides the Range (1939)
- Balalaika (1939)
- Chasing Trouble (1940)
- Foreign Correspondent (1940)
- Argentine Nights (1940)
- Phantom of Chinatown (1940)
- Drums of the Desert (1940)
- Mad Youth (1940)
- Hidden Enemy (1940)
- You're Out of Luck (1941)
- The Panther's Claw (1942)
- Enemy Agents Meet Ellery Queen (1942)
- The Dawn Express (1942)
- We Were Dancing (1942)
- Hangmen Also Die! (1943)
- Confessions of a Vice Baron (1943)
- The Boy from Stalingrad (1943)
- You Can't Beat the Law (1943)
- Man on a Tightrope (1953)

== Bibliography ==
- Pitts, Michael R. Poverty Row Studios, 1929-1940. McFarland & Company, 1997.
- Schaefer, Eric. "Bold! Daring! Shocking! True!": A History of Exploitation Films, 1919-1959. Duke University Press, 1999.
