= Sagebrush Heroes =

1945 film by Benjamin H. Kline

- Theatrical release poster
- Directed by: Benjamin H. Kline
- Screenplay by: Luci Ward
- Produced by: Jack Fier
- Starring: Charles Starrett; Dub Taylor; Constance Worth; Jimmy Wakely; Ozie Waters; Elvin Field
- Cinematography: George Meehan
- Edited by: Aaron Stell
- Production company: Columbia Pictures
- Distributed by: Columbia Pictures
- Release date: February 1, 1945
- Running time: 54 minutes
- Country: United States
- Language: English

Sagebrush Heroes is a 1945 American Western film directed by Benjamin H. Kline and written by Luci Ward. The film stars Charles Starrett, Dub Taylor, Constance Worth, Jimmy Wakely, Ozie Waters and Elvin Field. The film was released on February 1, 1945, by Columbia Pictures.

== Cast ==
- Charles Starrett as Steve Randall / The Durango Kid
- Dub Taylor as Cannonball
- Constance Worth as Connie Pearson
- Jimmy Wakely as Jimmy
- Ozie Waters as Calico Jones
- Elvin Field as Marty Jones
- Bobby Larson as Tim
- Forrest Taylor as Tom Goodwin
- Joel Friedkin as Doctor Webb
- Lane Chandler as Colton
- Paul Conrad as Brady
- Eddie Laughton as Layton
- John Tyrrell as Finley
