= Blondie (radio series) =

1940s radio sitcom adapted from the Blondie comic strip

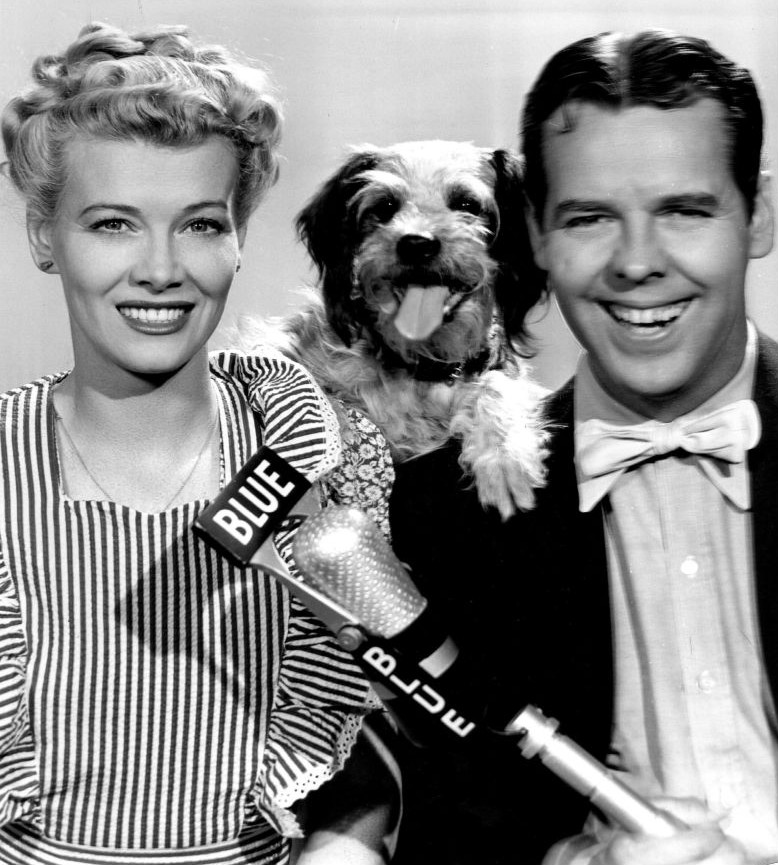
- Singleton and Lake in their radio roles.
- Genre: situation comedy
- Running time: 30 minutes
- Country of origin: United States
- Language: English
- Home station: CBS (1939-1948) NBC Blue (1944) NBC (1948-1949) ABC (1949-1950)
- Starring: Arthur Lake, Penny Singleton
- Original release: July 3, 1939 – July 6, 1950
- No. of episodes: 548

Blondie is a radio situation comedy adapted from the long-running Blondie comic strip by Chic Young. It stars Arthur Lake as Dagwood Bumstead and, for the majority of its run, Penny Singleton as Blondie Bumstead. The radio program ran on several networks from 1939 to 1950.

== Broadcast history ==
In 1938, Penny Singleton and Arthur Lake were cast in the Columbia Pictures film Blondie. The film was a box office success and a long-running film series went into production, lasting until 1950 and featuring twenty-eight feature films. As part of the promotion for the first film, Singleton and Lake appeared as Blondie and Dagwood on the December 20, 1938 episode of The Pepsodent Show radio program, which starred Bob Hope.

The appearance with Hope led to their own show, beginning July 3, 1939, on CBS as a summer replacement for The Eddie Cantor Show. However, Cantor did not return in the fall, so the sponsor, R.J. Reynolds' Camel cigarettes chose to keep Blondie on the air Mondays at 7:30 p.m. Camel remained the sponsor until June 26, 1944.

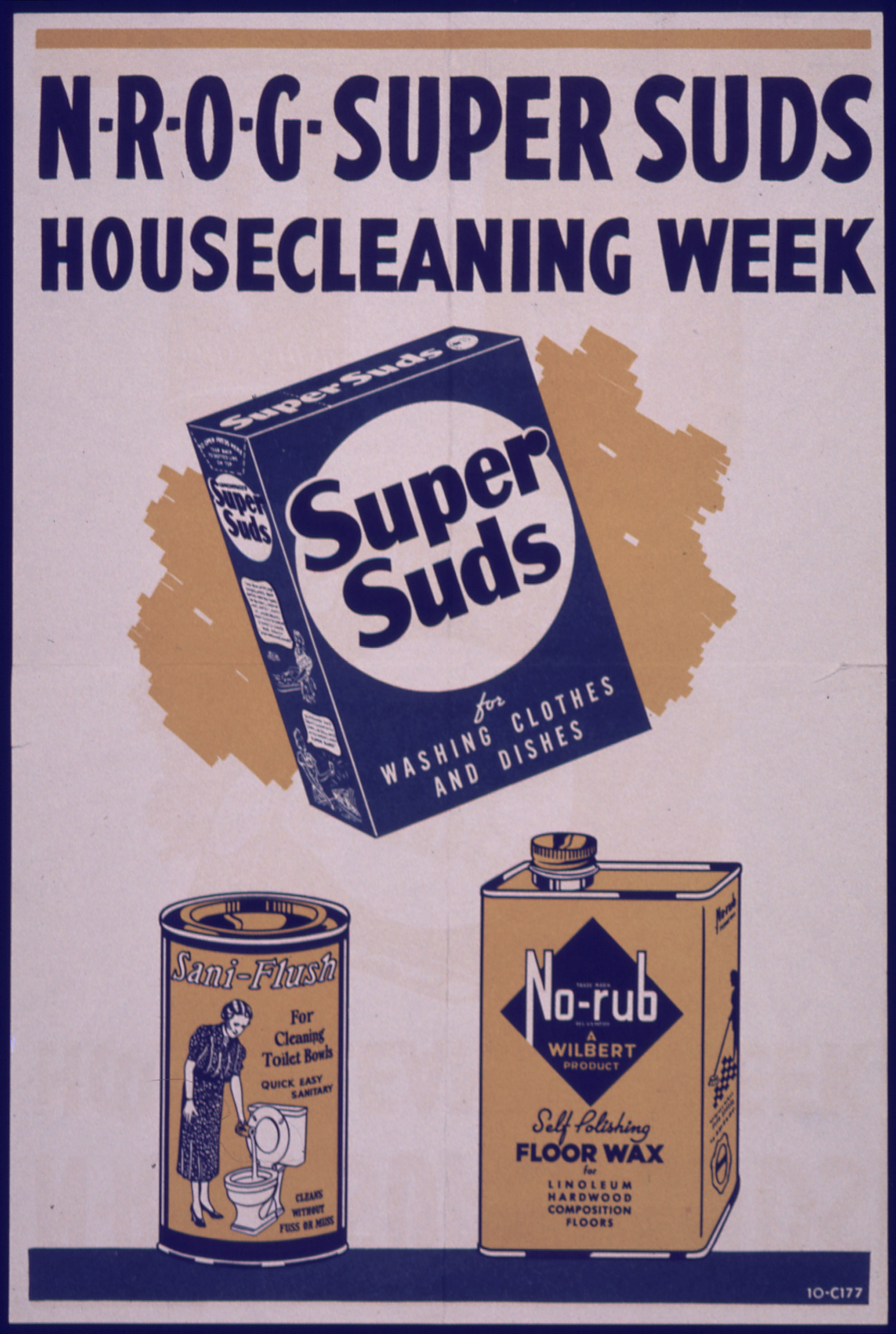
Super Suds WWII advertisement

In 1944, Blondie was on the NBC Blue Network, sponsored by Colgate-Palmolive's Super Suds, airing Fridays at 7 p.m. from July 21 to September 1. The final three weeks of that run overlapped with Blondie's return to CBS on Sundays at 8pm from August 13, 1944, to September 26, 1948, still sponsored by Super Suds. Beginning in mid-1945, the 30-minute program was heard on Mondays at 7:30 p.m. Super Suds continued as the sponsor when the show moved to NBC on Wednesdays at 8 p.m. from October 6, 1948, to June 29, 1949.

Early in 1949, Colgate executive Bob Healy notified Singleton that the company desired "a different interpretation of the character", and an agency began auditioning actresses to be the new Blondie. Ann Rutherford replaced her as the voice of Blondie. In October 1949, Patricia Lake, the real life wife of Arthur Lake took the role. Alice White was also heard as radio's Blondie.

In its final season, the series was on ABC as a sustaining program from October 6, 1949, to July 6, 1950, first airing Thursdays at 8 p.m. and then (from May) at 8:30 p.m. The radio show ended the same year as the Blondie film series.

Arthur Lake would later return to the role of Dagwood in the 1957 television series Blondie opposite Pamela Britton as Blondie.

== Cast ==
- Blondie Bumstead - Penny Singleton (1939 - 1949) / Ann Rutherford (1949) / Patricia Lake (1949 - 1950) / Alice White
- Dagwood Bumstead - Arthur Lake
- Alexander Bumstead - Leone Ledoux (1939 - 1943) / Tommy Cook (1943 - 1946) / Larry Simms (1946 - 1949) / Jeffrey Silver (1949 - 1950)
- Cookie Bumstead - Leone Ledoux (1939 - 1946) / Marlene Aames (1946) / Norma Jean Nilsson (1947) / Joan Rae (1948 - 1950)
- J.C. Dithers - Hanley Stafford
- Mrs. Dithers - Elvia Allman
- Herb Woodley - Frank Nelson / Harold Peary
- Mr. Fuddle - Arthur Q. Bryan / Harry Lang
- Alvin Fuddle - Dix Davis
- Harriet - Mary Jane Croft
- Dimples Wilson - Veola Vonn / Lurene Tuttle
- Announcer - Bill Goodwin / Howard Petrie / Harlow Wilcox
- Additional cast (1939) - Rosemary DeCamp, Ed MacDonald, Hans Conried

== Crew ==
- Producer - Tom McKnight, Ashmead Scott
- Directors - Don Bernard, Eddie Pola, Glenhall Taylor
- Writers - Ashmead Scott, William Moore, Johnny Greene (1940)
- Music - Harry Lubin, Billy Artz, Lou Kosloff
- Sound Effects - Ray Erlenborn (CBS series) / Parker Cornel (NBC series)

== Listen to ==
- Internet Archive: Blondie (42 episodes)
