= Hanley Stafford =

American actor (1899–1968)

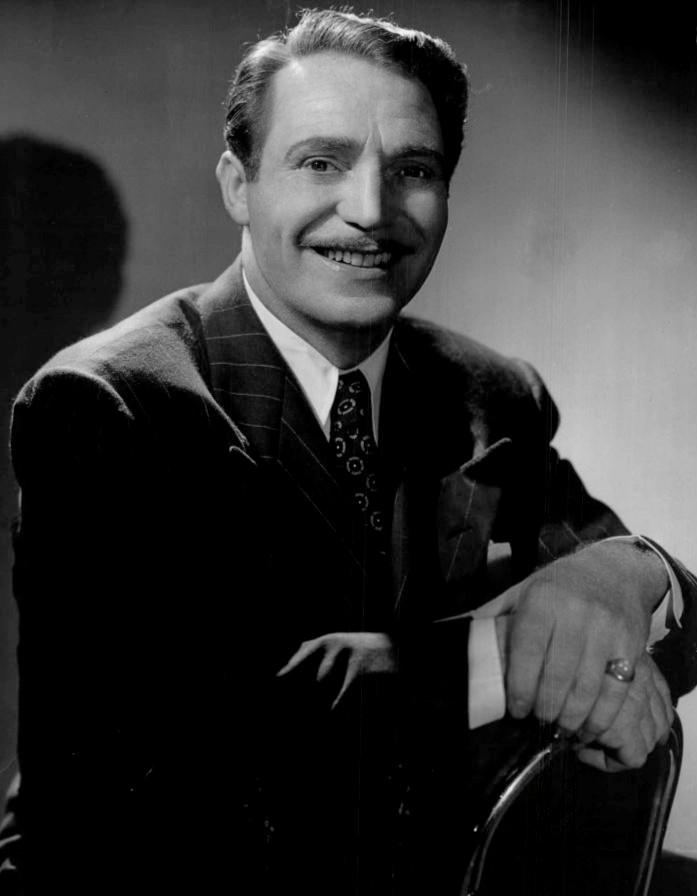
- Stafford in 1945
- Born: Alfred John Austin; September 22, 1899; Hanley, Staffordshire, England
- Died: September 9, 1968 (aged 68); Los Angeles, California, U.S.
- Resting place: Forest Lawn Memorial Park in Glendale, California
- Occupations: Radio, film, television actor
- Years active: 1918–1963
- Spouse(s): Doris Roberts (191?–1934, divorce); Bernice Bohnett (1935–1939, divorce); Veola Vonn (m. 1940)
- Children: 1

Hanley Stafford (born Alfred John Austin, September 22, 1899 – September 9, 1968) was an actor principally on radio.

He is remembered best for playing Lancelot Higgins on The Baby Snooks Show. Stafford also assumed the role of Mr. Dithers, the boss of Dagwood Bumstead on the Blondie radio program. He is commemorated by a star on the Hollywood Walk of Fame.

== Early life ==
Stafford emigrated from England to Winnipeg, Manitoba, Canada in 1911. In World War I he enlisted in the 43rd Battalion (Cameron Highlanders of Canada), CEF in 1915, was wounded in the Third Battle of Yprès in 1917 and returned to England in 1918. Until 1924 he toured Canada in drama productions and landed in Los Angeles that year. He played in stock for eight years and then in tent shows. He was appearing on KFWB radio in Los Angeles by April 1932 then went to Phoenix to manage a stock company, the Delmas-Lawless Players, before returning to Los Angeles to resume stage and radio work the following August.

== Career ==
After starring in the New York-originating radio detective series Thatcher Colt from September 1936 to March 1937, Stafford again returned to Los Angeles. He began the father role on The Baby Snooks Show on December 23, 1937 and played it until the final broadcast on May 22, 1951, two days before it was ended by the death of star Fanny Brice.

Between 1950 and 1963, Stafford appeared on various television series, beginning with The Popsicle Parade of Stars and Hollywood Premiere Theatre (1950–51), and concluding with his role as Kenneth Westcott in the episode "Lucy Is a Chaperone" of CBS's The Lucy Show. In between, he was cast on episodes of the ABC/Warner Brothers series Cheyenne, Maverick, Sugarfoot, and 77 Sunset Strip, in the latter as Admiral Thomas Kyle in the 1962 episode "Dress Rehearsal". Stafford guest starred on the CBS sitcoms The Brothers, The Betty Hutton Show, and Angel, in which he portrayed Mr. Corwin in the 1961 episode "The Second Marriage". He was cast in 1957 as Colonel Farnsworth in "The Regina Wainwright Story" of CBS's The Millionaire.

The 1940 U.S. Census records report him as living at 6200 Franklin Avenue in Hollywood, California, with his mother Emily Austin, 60, and his sister Anne Standing, 36, his age was given as 40. He reported his 1939 income to census takers as a minimum $5,000, the equivalent of $116,000 in 2025 dollars.

== Personal life ==
Stafford was married to radio actress and singer Veola Vonn on April 12, 1940 after his second wife Bernice failed to get a divorce decree, granted the previous April, set aside. He died of a heart attack at his home in Los Angeles on September 9, 1968. He had one son by his marriage to his first wife, Doris.
