= She Has What It Takes =

1943 film directed by Charles Barton

- Theatrical poster for the film
- Directed by: Charles Barton
- Screenplay by: Paul Yawitz
- Story by: Robert Lee Johnson; Paul Yawitz
- Produced by: Colbert Clark
- Starring: Jinx Falkenburg; Tom Neal; Constance Worth
- Cinematography: Philip Tannura
- Edited by: Al Clark
- Music by: M. W. Stoloff
- Production company: Columbia Pictures
- Release date: April 15, 1943 (US)
- Running time: 66 minutes
- Country: United States
- Language: English

She Has What It Takes is a 1943 American drama film directed by Charles Barton and starring Jinx Falkenburg, Tom Neal and Constance Worth.

== Cast ==
- Jinx Falkenburg as Fay Morris
- Tom Neal as Roger Rutledge
- Constance Worth as June Leslie
- Douglas Leavitt as Paul Miloff
- Joe King as Lee Shuleman
- Matt Willis as "One-Round" Beasley
- Daniel Ocko as Nick Partos
- George McKay as Mike McManus
- George Lloyd as "Shocker" Dodie
- Robert Homans as Capt. Pat O'Neal
- Joseph Crehan as George Clarke
- John H. Dilson as Chamberlain Jones
- Barbara Brown as Mrs. Walters
- Ann Evers as Janesy
- Harry Hayden as Mr. Jason
- Curly Wright as Tony

== Reception ==
In a contemporary review for the New York Daily News, critic Kate Cameron wrote: "The volatile Jinx Falkenburg is coming to the front as a screen personality. In Columbia's comedy 'She Has What It Takes,' the Jinx plays the leading role. To be sure, the picture is only grade B. But it gives the dark-haired beauty a chance to shine and prove that she really has what it takes to make a film star."
