= The Dawn Express =

1942 film by Albert Herman

- Theatrical poster
- Directed by: Albert Herman
- Written by: Arthur St. Claire (writer)
- Produced by: Arthur Alexander (associate producer); Max Alexander (producer); George M. Merrick (producer)
- Starring: Michael Whalen; Anne Nagel; William Bakewell; Constance Worth
- Cinematography: Edward Linden
- Edited by: Leete Renick Brown
- Music by: Lee Zahler (musical director)
- Production company: Merrick-Alexander Productions
- Distributed by: Producers Releasing Corporation
- Release date: March 27, 1942
- Running time: 54 minutes
- Country: United States
- Language: English

The Dawn Express (aka Dawn Express and Nazi Spy Ring (working title) is a 1942 American film directed by Albert Herman. The film stars Michael Whalen, Anne Nagel, William Bakewell and Constance Worth.

== Plot ==
In the middle of World War II, Nazi Capt. Gemmler is in need of a powerful chemical formula to improve the energy output of ordinary gasoline. In his quest for this formula he finds two individuals that he thinks will be of use and who are already involved in such a project. Using his secret agents, Gemmler has them kidnapped and then murdered when they cannot help him. Next he targets two others more closely involved: the chemist and playboy Tom Fielding and his co-worker, Robert Norton, who is engaged to Tom's sister Nancy.

The unsuspecting Tom goes to a nearby tavern one night, where he meets a Polish refugee named Linda Pavlo and strikes up a conversation with her. The following morning Tom is late for work and Robert warns him to be careful of such encounters. The president of the chemical company where they work, Franklyn Prescott, now gets a visit from a government agent, James Curtis, and is told that there has been a double murder in another chemical plant. Prescott is not worried, but refers to his security plan: the plant is only working on one half of the precious formula, while another plant on the East Coast is working on the other half. Curtis breaks the news to Prescott that the East Coast plant has been compromised and sabotaged by George Pembroke, one of its own chemists now identified as working for the Nazis under the name of Karl Schmidt, who stole half of the formula,.

In the night, when Tom and Robert return to the same tavern as before, Curtis' agents follow them there. Tom meets Linda again, and since she is actually a Nazi agent he is lured into a room where Gemmler is waiting. Gemmler threatens to hurt both Tom's mother and his sister Nancy if they do not play along and give him the formula. When Tom leaves the tavern that night, he is again followed by one of Curtis' men, but one of Gemmler's spies (in the disguise of a blind beggar) murders the agent.

The following day Prescott and Curtis talk to Robert, explaining their theory that Tom, in an act of treason, has murdered the agent. Robert does not believe it, claiming Tom is innocent. What none of them are aware of is that Tom's sister Nancy is eavesdropping on their conversation. After Prescott and Curtis have left, Tom and Robert talk about what is going on; later that night Tom meets once more with Linda at the bar. This time she offers him $100,000 in exchange for the formula.

After Tom's meeting with Linda, he, Robert and Nancy team up to try to frame the Nazi spies and get rid of them once and for all. Tom goes to the chemical plant to retrieve the formula and gives it to Robert. He in turn brings the formula to his meeting with Linda and is escorted to Gemmler's office. Suddenly, Tom appears at Gemmler's office and starts arguing over the payment. This results in Gemmler withholding payment entirely. Robert is knocked out by Gemmler's goons. The spies bring Tom with them to the airport, where Gemmler's contact, Karl Schmidt, is about to arrive on 'the Dawn Express'.

The government agents have followed Tom and his party, but are too late to catch Gemmler before he leaves for the airport. They do, however, arrest Linda and a few other collaborators lingering at Gemmler's office. At the airport, Gemmler forces Tom into the aircraft and it takes off. Schmidt decides to test the formula while they are in mid-air. Tom, who knows that the future of his country and of his family is at stake, has deliberately brought along an unstable compound to mix with the chemical ingredients brought by Schmidt. The aircraft explodes, leaving no survivors, with Tom sacrificing himself to prevent the formula from reaching its destination.

== Cast ==
- Michael Whalen as Robert Norton
- Anne Nagel as Nancy Fielding
- William Bakewell as Tom Fielding
- Constance Worth as Linda Pavlo
- Hans Heinrich von Twardowski as Capt. Gemmler
- Jack Mulhall as Chief Agent James Curtis
- George Pembroke as Prof. Karl Schmidt
- Kenneth Harlan as Agent Brown
- Robert Frazer as John Oliver
- Hans von Morhart as Heinrich, kidnapper
- Michael Vallon as Argus, blind spy (credited as Michael Vallin)
- William Castello as Otto - Tavern spy
- C. Montague Shaw as Franklyn Prescott (Uncredited)

== Production ==
Principal photography on The Dawn Express with the working title of Nazi Sky Ring, began January 30, 1942, at Sunset Studio. Stock footage of a Douglas DST was used. The Dawn Express was typical of the films produced early in World War II that concentrated on enemy espionage. Often rushed into production as B films, the plot was usually grafted onto mystery or western films.

== Reception ==
The Dawn Express was not critically reviewed, as the film was a low-budget production that, other than featuring the steady and reliable Nagel, who appeared in a bevy of "light leading roles" during this period, had little to offer.

The Dawn Express is in the public domain and is now preserved in many online sites.
