= Saturday's Heroes =

1937 film directed by Edward Killy

- Directed by: Edward Killy
- Screenplay by: Paul Yawitz; Charles Kaufman; David Silverstein
- Story by: George Templeton
- Produced by: Robert Sisk
- Starring: Van Heflin; Marian Marsh; Richard Lane; Alan Bruce; Willie Best
- Cinematography: Nicholas Musuraca
- Edited by: Frederic Knudtson
- Production company: RKO Radio Pictures
- Release date: October 8, 1937 (US)
- Running time: 60 minutes
- Country: United States
- Language: English

Saturday's Heroes is a 1937 American drama film directed by Edward Killy from a screenplay by Paul Yawitz, Charles Kaufman, and David Silverstein based on George Templeton's story. Produced and distributed by RKO Radio Pictures, the film stars Van Heflin, Marian Marsh, Richard Lane, Alan Bruce and Willie Best.

== Plot ==
Val Webster is the quarterback of Calton College's football team, but besides dealing with criticism of his play, Val needs money, which he gets by scalping tickets to the games.

A teammate, Ted Calkins, commits suicide after being caught moonlighting at a job, and Val's ticket scheme is exposed as well, causing university president Hammond to expel him. Disgusted by the hypocrisy in college athletics, where the school reaps hundreds of thousands of dollars while the athletes stay broke, Val teams with sportswriter Red Watson to bring attention to the matter, with girlfriend Frances providing moral support.

Val lands a job coaching for a rival college. When its game against Calton comes up, the outcome convinces Hammond and others that something must be done to change the unjust way student-athletes are rewarded for their play.

== Cast ==
- Van Heflin as Val Webster
- Marian Marsh as Frances Thomas
- Richard Lane as Red I. Watson
- Alan Bruce as Burgeson
- Minor Watson as Doc Thomas
- Frank Jenks as Dubrowsky
- Willie Best as Sam
- Walter Miller as Coach Banks
- Crawford Weaver as Baker
- George Irving as President Hammond
- John Arledge as Ted Calkins
- Dick Hogan as Freshman
- Al St. John as Andy Jones
- Charles Trowbridge as President Horace C. Mitchell

(cast list as per AFI database)

== See also ==
- List of American football films
