= Veola Vonn =

American actress (1918–1995)

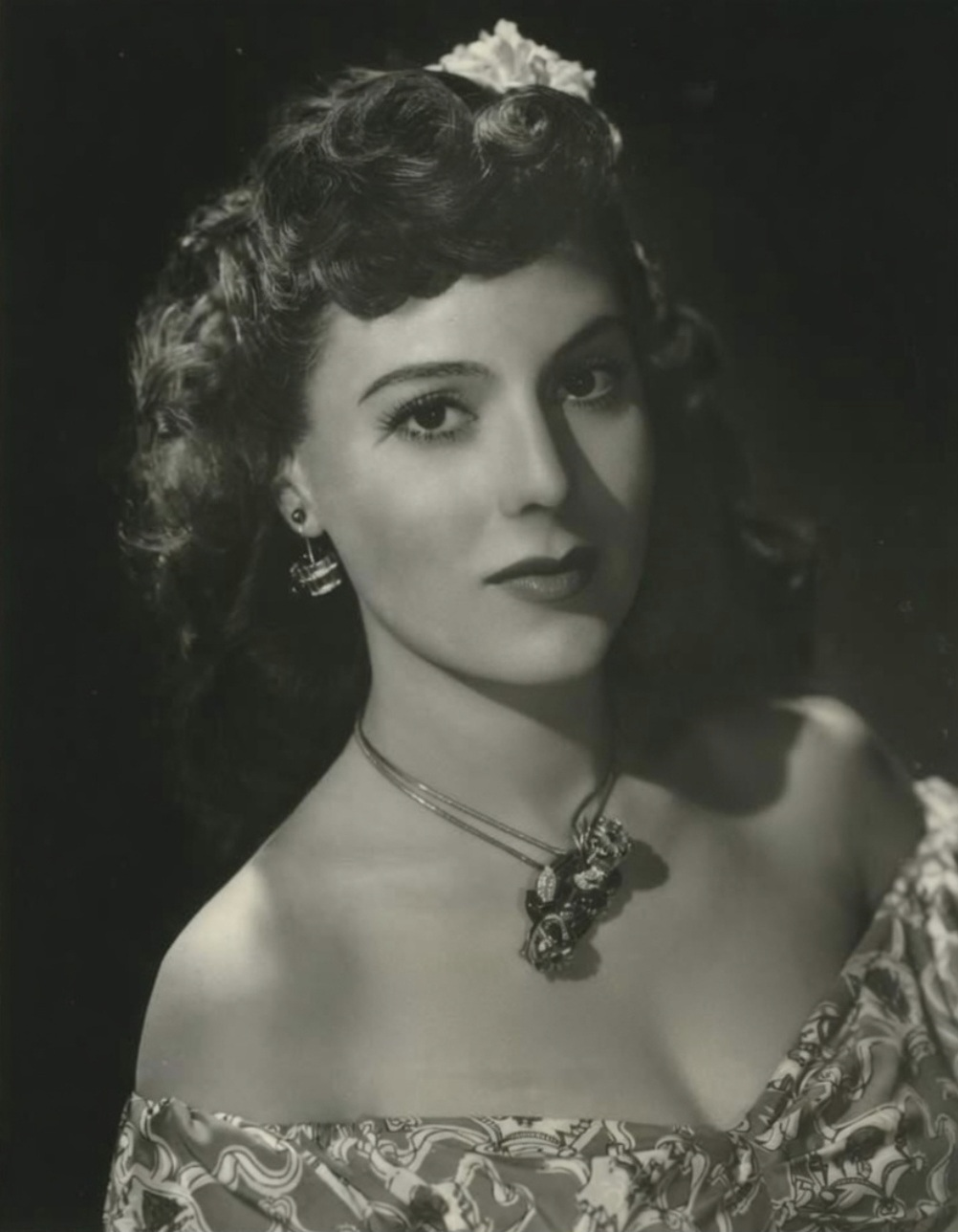
- Vonn in 1948
- Born: July 27, 1918; New York City, U.S.
- Died: October 28, 1995 (aged 77); Orange County, California, U.S.
- Other name: Vyola Vonn
- Occupation: Actress
- Years active: 1935–1962 (film & TV)

Veola Vonn (July 27, 1918 – October 28, 1995) was an American radio actress and singer who also appeared in a number of films and television series. Her first feature film was the Poverty Row Smashing the Vice Trust (1937) in which she played the female lead. She was married to the British actor Hanley Stafford and appeared alongside him on several radio shows including Blondie. After his death she married actor Frank Nelson. She is sometimes credited as Vyola Vonn.

== Selected filmography ==
- Smashing the Vice Trust (1937)
- Ragtime Cowboy Joe (1940)
- Burma Convoy (1941)
- My Favorite Spy (1951)
- South Sea Woman (1953)
- Paris Playboys (1954)
- Phantom of the Rue Morgue (1954)
- Spy Chasers (1955)
- The Go-Getter (1956)
- Lafayette Escadrille (1958)
- The 30 Foot Bride of Candy Rock (1959)

== Bibliography ==
- Reinehr, Robert C. & Swartz, Jon D. The A to Z of Old Time Radio. Scarecrow Press, 2010.
- Schaefer, Eric. "Bold! Daring! Shocking! True!": A History of Exploitation Films, 1919–1959. Duke University Press, 1999.
- Schulz, Clair. Tuning in the Great Gildersleeve: The Episodes and Cast of Radio's First Spinoff Show, 1941–1957. McFarland, 2013.
