= Of Human Bondage (1964 film) =

1964 British film by Ken Hughes

- Theatrical release poster
- Directed by: Ken Hughes 'additional scenes by Henry Hathaway; Uncredited: Bryan Forbes
- Written by: Bryan Forbes
- Based on: Of Human Bondage; 1915 novel by W. Somerset Maugham
- Produced by: James Woolf
- Starring: Kim Novak; Laurence Harvey
- Cinematography: Oswald Morris; Denys Coop
- Edited by: Russell Lloyd
- Music by: Ron Goodwin
- Production company: Seven Arts Productions
- Distributed by: Metro-Goldwyn-Mayer
- Release date: 23 September 1964
- Running time: 100 minutes
- Country: United Kingdom
- Language: English
- Box office: $1,750,000 (US/ Canada)

Of Human Bondage is a 1964 British drama film directed by Ken Hughes and starring Kim Novak and Laurence Harvey in the roles played by Bette Davis and Leslie Howard three decades earlier in the original film version. This MGM release, the third screen adaptation of W. Somerset Maugham's 1915 novel, was written by Bryan Forbes from the novel by Somerset Maugham.

== Plot ==
After two unsuccessful years pursuing an art career in Paris, clubfooted Philip Carey decides to study medicine. He meets and falls in love with Mildred Rogers, a low-class waitress who takes advantage of his feelings for her.

When she leaves him to marry another man, Philip falls in love with Nora Nesbitt, a writer who encourages him to complete his studies. Mildred returns, pregnant and abandoned by her husband, and Philip takes her in and cares for her, ending his relationship with Nora.

While staying with Philip, Mildred has an affair with his best friend Griffiths, and when Philip confronts her, she tells Philip she's repulsed by him and walks out.

After earning his degree, Philip becomes a junior doctor at a London hospital. He learns Mildred is working as a prostitute and seeks her out at the brothel where she's living with her ailing child.

He takes the two under his wing, but once again Mildred leaves him. When he finally finds her in a clinic for the indigent, he discovers her child has died and Mildred, in the advanced stages of syphilis, dies in her spurned lover's arms.

== Cast ==
- Kim Novak as Mildred Rogers
- Laurence Harvey as Philip Carey
- Robert Morley as Dr. Jacobs
- Siobhán McKenna as Nora Nesbitt
- Roger Livesey as Thorpe Athelny
- Jack Hedley as Griffiths
- Nanette Newman as Sally Athelny
- Ronald Lacey as Matty Mathews

== Production ==
=== Development ===
The first screen adaptation of Maugham's novel, made thirty years prior, starred Leslie Howard and Bette Davis. Paul Henreid and Eleanor Parker co-starred in the 1946 remake for Warner Bros.

In December 1961 it was announced that Laurence Harvey would play the male lead in a third screen version of Of Human Bondage. It was to be made in conjunction with Seven Arts Films with James Woolf to produce the following year; Peter Glenville was being pursued to direct. Harvey made numerous films for Woolf.

In February 1962 Orin Jennings was reportedly writing the script. The following month Harvey said he would make the movie after Running Man. Harvey went to visit Somerset Maugham in France to get the author's advice on how to play the role.

In July 1962 Ray Stark, head of Seven Arts, said he had turned down an offer from a leading female star to appear in the movie on the grounds she was too expensive; he said she would have led to them requiring a further $3 million to break even.

In November Seven Arts announced the director would be Henry Hathaway who had tried to make the film four years previously with Marilyn Monroe and Montgomery Clift as the leads. Hathaway said "I firmly believe that she [Monroe] would still be alive today if she had played Of Human Bondage. It would have given her the roles she longed for and which I know she could have done."

In December 1962 it was announced Kim Novak would play the female lead.

Bette Davis was offered a support role that would have taken two days to shoot. She turned it down.

Seven Arts wanted to shoot the move at Ardmore Studios in Ireland. English trade unions insisted their members be brought from England to work on the film. There was considerable unrest involving the union prior to filming. This led to legal proceedings after the film had been made but did not stop production.

=== Shooting ===
Henry Hathaway arrived in Dublin on 9 February 1963 and filming began later that month. Hathaway quit the film in late March after conflict with Kim Novak. Hathaway said that the time. "I never raised my voice at Kim; she never raised her voice to me. It's just like marriage - sometimes the partners are incompatible." However, Tony Booth, who had a small role in the film, said Hathaway routinely disparaged Novak's performance and acting ability, particularly her cockney accent. Novak said Hathaway never complained to her about her accent, but said the director "tried to make me into a sexy symbol rather than the complicated person Mildred was. It backfired."

Screenwriter Bryan Forbes then briefly tackled the job of directing, while Seven Arts looked for a replacement. They considered John Huston and Richard Quine before deciding on Ken Hughes, who had made Trials of Oscar Wilde with Seven Arts. Hathaway claims Forbes "was sort of going" with Novak at the time and "only last four days" before they called in Ken Hughes.

Ken Hughes arrived in early April. Kim Novak failed to show up on set one morning, going on a 48 hour shopping trip to London, leading to rumours she would be replaced by Elizabeth Taylor. Novak told the press she was unhappy on the film and that while she was willing to honour her contract, she would prefer to leave the film. She said that Hughes was rewriting the script and she was afraid she would have to reshoot scenes she had already done. "Things aren't easy on this film," she said. "There's been a bit of confusion and it's very wearying. Am I happy about things now? No not really. I'd sooner see someone else take over if the whole thing is going to be done again."

"I've never worked on a film about which there's been so many rumours," said Hughes. "Most of them are nonsense. Everything is hunky-dory." Novak returned to the film and the shoot was completed by June. Booth worked on the Hughes-directed portion and says Hughes did not get along with Laurence Harvey. Novak said Hughes "was really a case. I tried to talk about the character with him, but he just wasn't interested. He walked around the set constantly pounding a set of bongo drums - you would ask him a question and he would slap the drums."

Producer James Woolf, a long time supporter of Harvey's as well as his occasional lover, took an overdose of barbiturates during the making of the film, but survived.

The film was denied a Production Code Seal due to some brief nudity.

Bryan Forbes later sued Seven Arts claiming they owed him £5,000 from a £10,000 acting fee.

== Critical reception ==
A. H. Weiler of The New York Times called the film a "surface, stoic old-fashioned tale" and added, "The pitiful meagerness of heartfelt dialogue, direction and acting, so essential in transporting Maugham's three-dimensional figures from book to screen, is noticeable almost from the start of this largely unemotional drama. These are not classically tortured people who emerge whole and alive on film but are, instead, artificially quaint Edwardians who are simply play acting and speaking lines that seem alien to them and the viewer ... Laurence Harvey and Kim Novak ... seem painfully miscast. Mr. Harvey's portrayal is, at best, a succession of basically vacuous, woebegone attitudes. He appears to be more distracted than heartsick or emotionally undone. One wonders what he ever saw, aside from an occasional physical view, in Miss Novak's conception of the ill-fated, blonde Cockney whose East End accent and actions are often a laughable parody of the real articles ... Most of the time, this pallid drama constitutes bondage for a discerning observer."

Time said, "As portrayed by actress Novak, Mildred giggles a lot and speaks cockney like a girl who learned the sound of Bow bells from somewhere in South Chicago."

TV Guide says, "As the doomed pair, Novak and Harvey are passable, but little more than that. Harvey looks too old for the role, and fails to give his character much life, while Novak, although making a valiant attempt, never conveys enough passion to make her role believable. Further denying any dramatic potential is Forbes' uninspired adaptation of Maugham's novel. Rather than probe the psychological make-up of the characters, the script consistently focuses on superficial motivations with all the emotional intensity of a high-school drama-society production."

Filmink claimed "The resulting film is interesting, and contains one of Harvey’s best performances, but isn’t that good. Novak’s performance doesn’t help and, more seriously, Hughes doesn’t get – or didn’t have time to capture – the essential DNA of the story."

The film was condemned by the National Legion of Decency for its sexual content and masochism.

== Awards and honours ==
- 1965: BAFTA Film Award for Best British Costume Design, Black and White (Beatrice Dawson)

== Notes ==
- Booth, Tony (1997). Labour of love. Blake.
