= Smashing the Vice Trust =

1937 film

- Directed by: Melville Shyer
- Written by: Marion Candler
- Produced by: Willis Kent
- Starring: Willy Castello; Veola Vonn; Selmer Jackson
- Cinematography: Robert E. Cline
- Edited by: Fred Bain
- Production company: Willis Kent Productions
- Distributed by: Willis Kent Productions
- Release date: January 3, 1937
- Running time: 60 minutes
- Country: United States
- Language: English

Smashing the Vice Trust is a 1937 American crime drama film directed by Melville Shyer and starring Willy Castello, Veola Vonn and Selmer Jackson. Marketed as an exploitation film, it was produced and distributed by the Poverty Row studio Willis Kent Productions. Castello later reprised the role for another Kent film Confessions of a Vice Baron (1942).

== Plot ==
Criminal 'Lucky' Lombardi notices that profits are down in his vice empire and has him henchman begin a campaign of recruiting of kidnapping pretty high school girls to work for him as prostitutes, even as he backs a campaign to crack down on vice targeted at his rivals.

== Cast ==
- Willy Castello as James 'Lucky' Lombardi
- Veola Vonn as Lois Bacon
- Dean Benton as Harry
- Selmer Jackson as District Attorney
- Sam Flint as Martin Standish - Crooked Lawyer
- Paul Parry as Eddie
- Sheldon Jett as Henchman
- Frank LaRue as Mr. Bacon
- Augusta Anderson as Madam
- Maude Fealy as Mrs. Bacon
- Ed Cassidy as Police Officer
- Lester Dorr as Eddie's Henchman

== Bibliography ==
- Pitts, Michael R. Poverty Row Studios, 1929-1940. McFarland & Company, 1997.
- Schaefer, Eric. "Bold! Daring! Shocking! True!": A History of Exploitation Films, 1919-1959. Duke University Press, 1999.
