= Constance Worth =

Australian actress (1911–1963)

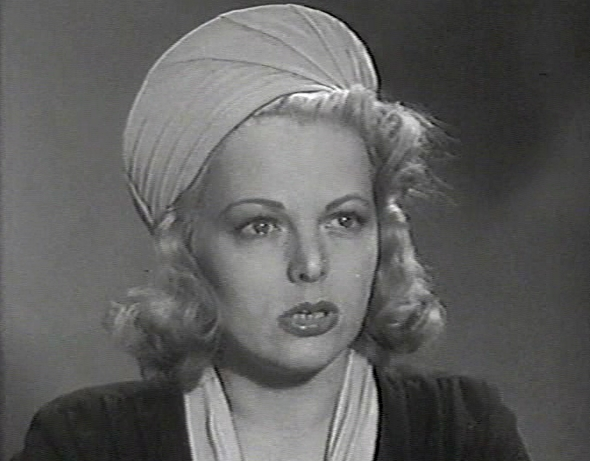
- Worth in The Wages of Sin (1938)
- Born: Enid Joyce Howarth; 19 August 1911; Sydney, Australia
- Died: 18 October 1963 (aged 52); Los Angeles, California, U.S.
- Occupation: Actress
- Years active: 1933–1949
- Spouses: George Brent (m. 1937; div. 1937) William A. Pierce (m. 1946)

Constance Worth (born Enid Joyce Howarth; 19 August 1911 – 18 October 1963) was an Australian actress who became a Hollywood star in the late 1930s. She was also known as Jocelyn Howarth.

== Early life and career ==
She was born in Sydney, Australia in 1911, the youngest of three daughters of businessman Moffatt Howarth and his wife Mary Ellen (née Dumbrell).

She attended Ascham School and a finishing school. She appeared on stage at Sydney's Independent theatre in a production of Cynara.

== Film career in Australia ==
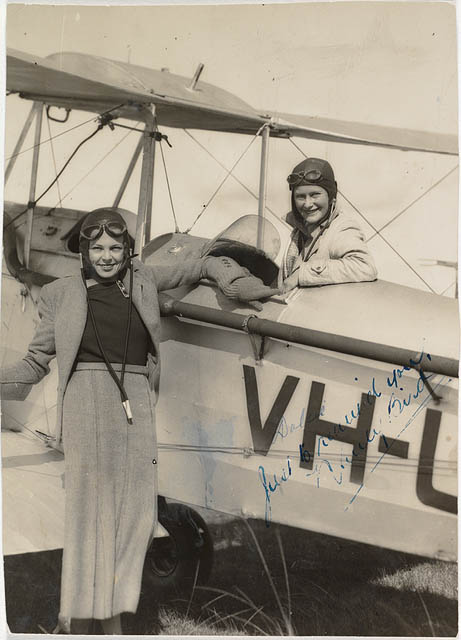
Jocelyn Howarth and Nancy Bird Walton, ca. 1932 – by unknown photographer.

Her film debut was in the title role in the Cinesound movie The Squatter's Daughter (1933), produced and directed by Ken G. Hall. Hall claimed Howarth's first screen test showed "light and shade, good diction, no accent and (that) she undoubtedly could act with no sign of the self-consciousness which almost always characterised the amateur." The film was a financial success.

In August 1933 Cinesound put her under an 18-month contract, a rarity at the time.

In late 1933, Smith's Weekly raved enthusiastically about the young actress; "Young Joy Howarth who leapt into publicity when she became the Squatter's Daughter a few months ago, is just the big hit nowadays...."

She had a supporting role in Hall's next film, The Silence of Dean Maitland (1934), which was also a box-office success.

In June 1934 she signed a contract with J.C. Williamson Ltd for whom she appeared on stage in The Wind and the Rain by Merton Hodge. Howarth toured in the play in Melbourne, Sydney and Brisbane.

== Move to Hollywood ==
In April 1936, she sailed for the United States and Hollywood. A report in the Los Angeles Times said she was going to England, but she decided to stay in the US. (She later said she was stranded in the country due to a maritime strike.)

On August 5 1936 it was reported she had tried to kill herself because she was "despondent about getting work", although shortly afterwards it was claimed this was an accident.

=== RKO ===
In October 1936 she signed a year long contract with RKO Pictures. Worth tested for a film by Edward Small, Clementina. It was not made. However she was top billed in her first film for RKO: China Passage (1937), originally called Miss Customs Agent. Because she appeared opposite established Hollywood actor Vinton Hayworth, RKO decided to give her a new name "Constance Worth".

In December 1936 RKO announced she would co star with Robert Donat in Son of Monte Cristo. In February 1937 RKO announced her for Borrowed Time. Instead she was in Windjammer (1937) which she made with George O'Brien. She broke her hip during filming. After Windjammer, RKO offered her no more films.

Her next role was in Willis Kent's 1938 exploitation quickie, The Wages of Sin (1938), playing a young woman lured into prostitution.

Worth had a supporting role in Mystery of the White Room (1939) at Universal.

In June 1939, she returned to Australia for a three-month visit. She returned in late October. Her name was linked romantically to Ivan Goff around this time.

=== Columbia ===
In August 1940 she signed a contract with Columbia. She had a supporting part in Angels Over Broadway (1940) with Rita Hayworth; Worth wanted to resume her name "Joy Howarth" but it was felt this was too close to Hayworth so she kept her new stage name. Columbia put her in Meet Boston Blackie (1940).

At PRC she had a supporting role in Criminals Within (1941), directed by Joseph H. Lewis, then she appeared in an uncredited minor role in Alfred Hitchcock's Suspicion (1941).

In November 1940, she reportedly signed a three-picture deal with Paramount but appears not to have made movies for this studio. She lost a part in They Dare Not Love because Brent was cast.

Worth was fourth billed in the gangster B film Borrowed Hero (1941) at Monogram and The Dawn Express (1942) at RKO. Back at Columbia, she was billed third in Boston Blackie Goes Hollywood (1942), then at Universal, she was uncredited in When Johnny Comes Marching Home (1942). In January 1942, she was linked to Clementina again.

She went to work as a waitress at a drive-in restaurant, which led to an item in a gossip column and drew the attention of Harry Cohn. In December 1942, she reportedly signed a five-year contract with Columbia. "It was not a star's contract by any means", she said later, "but I grabbed it very gratefully. I stayed at Columbia for about two years, but never did anything but small roles and a few leads in B pictures. In fact, I became known as 'Queen of the B's' at Columbia."

Worth had a minor role in Columbia's City Without Men (1943), but she was billed third in Republic's serial G-Men vs. The Black Dragon (1943). At Columbia, she had a supporting role in Let's Have Fun (1943) and She Has What It Takes (1943), then was uncredited in Crime Doctor (1943), Appointment in Berlin (1943), Dangerous Blondes (1943), My Kingdom for a Cook (1943). She had billing in The Crime Doctor's Strangest Case (1943) and had a decent role in Klondike Kate (1943), directed by William Castle. She was billed third in Who's Hugh? (1943).

Worth had uncredited roles in Cover Girl (1944) and Jam Session (1944).

At Paramount, she had an uncredited role in Frenchman's Creek (1944). At Columbia, she was Charles Starrett's leading lady in the Westerns Cyclone Prairie Rangers (1944) and Sagebrush Heroes (1945).

=== Last roles ===
For Sigmund Neufeld at PRC, she played a supporting part in The Kid Sister (1945) and was unbilled in Dillinger (1945) at Monogram.

Worth had a supporting part in PRC's Why Girls Leave Home (1945) and Monogram's Sensation Hunters (1945), and a minor role in RKO's Deadline at Dawn (1946). In August 1945, she said "I have no desire to play romantic leads any more, though I do think I still look good enough for such roles. I'm now concentrating on character parts, similar to those that have made Claire Trevor famous. I think I can do them, and I feel they'll offer me a longer screen life than romantic leads. At least the competition won't be so stiff."

She had an uncredited role in The Set-Up (1949). Her last film was a minor role in the Johnny Mack Brown Monogram Western Western Renegades (1949).

Throughout her career and as late as 1961, publicity in Australia repeatedly suggested she was on the verge of signing a major studio contract again. This did not happen.

== Personal life ==
On 10 May 1937, she married Irish actor George Brent in Mexico after a courtship of six weeks. After only a few weeks, they separated, and a divorce was granted the same year. Brent sought an annulment claiming that the marriage in Mexico was not legal. The case went to trial in August 1937 and was highly publicized, and Worth broke down in tears during proceedings. The court ruled the marriage was legal in September. She sued for divorce in November, and it was granted in December.

The marriage and drama of the divorce attracted enormous newspaper publicity in Australia. Denis O’Brien comments that even in 1939 "the Weekly still was dredging the Howarth saga" in its report on her latest film Mystery of the White Room (1939). "I didn't get a penny", she declared in 1945, "though I could have demanded $120,000 as my share of George's community property. But I was too proud then to accept money from a man who didn't want me. I'd not be so proud now."

In January 1946, she was again in newspapers, cited in divorce proceedings by the wife of Hollywood scriptwriter William A. Pierce. Both denied any impropriety, but within a year of his divorce, they married.

In August 1947, Australian newspapers reported that she had been severely injured in a car accident and had undergone plastic surgery.

== Death ==
Constance Worth died, aged 52, in Hollywood on 18 October 1963, an "ordinary housewife," reportedly from anemia. Ken Hall remarked that "unhappy circumstances" surrounded her death.

She occasionally is mistaken for a British silent-era stage and film actress of the same name, active from 1919 to 1922.

== Partial filmography ==
- The Squatter's Daughter (1933) – Joan Enderby
- The Silence of Dean Maitland (1934) – Alma Gray
- China Passage (1937) – Jane Dunn
- Windjammer (1937) – Betty Selby
- The Wages of Sin (1938) – Marjorie Benton
- Mystery of the White Room (1939) – Ann Stokes
- Angels Over Broadway (1940) – Sylvia Marbe
- Meet Boston Blackie (1941) – Marilyn Howard
- Criminals Within (1941) – Alma Barton
- Suspicion (1941) – Mrs. Fitzpatrick (uncredited)
- Borrowed Hero (1941) – Mona Brooks
- The Dawn Express (1942) – Linda Pavlo
- Boston Blackie Goes Hollywood (1942) – Gloria Lane
- When Johnny Comes Marching Home (1942) – Blonde Vamp (uncredited)
- City Without Men (1943) – Elsie
- G-Men vs the Black Dragon (1943, Serial) – Agent Vivian Marsh
- Let's Have Fun (1943) – Diana Crawford
- She Has What It Takes (1943) – June Leslie
- Crime Doctor (1943) – Betty, Ordway's Nurse-Receptionist (uncredited)
- Appointment in Berlin (1943) – English Girl (uncredited)
- Dangerous Blondes (1943) – Reporter (uncredited)
- My Kingdom for a Cook (1943) – Airline Auxiliary Girl (uncredited)
- The Crime Doctor's Strangest Case (1943) – Betty Watson
- Klondike Kate (1943) – Lita
- Cover Girl (1944) – Receptionist (uncredited)
- Jam Session (1944) – Ms. Dooley (uncredited)
- Frenchman's Creek (1944) – Woman in Gaming House (uncredited)
- Cyclone Prairie Rangers (1944) – Lola
- Sagebrush Heroes (1945) – Connie Pearson
- The Kid Sister (1945) – Ethel Hollingsworth
- Dillinger (1945) – Woman in Bar
- Why Girls Leave Home (1945) – Flo
- Sensation Hunters (1945) – Irene
- Deadline at Dawn (1946) – Nan Raymond
- The Set-Up (1949) – Wife (uncredited)
- Western Renegades (1949) – Fake Ann Gordon (final film role)
