= The Pace That Kills (1935 film) =

1935 American exploitation film

- Theatrical poster (1935)
- Directed by: Norton S. Parker; William A. O'Connor (credited as Wm. A. O'Connor)
- Produced by: Willis Kent
- Starring: Lois January
- Narrated by: Willis Kent (credited as presenter)
- Cinematography: Jack Greenhalgh
- Edited by: Holbrook N. Todd
- Production company: Willis Kent Productions
- Distributed by: "State Rights"
- Release date: December 1935
- Running time: 68 minutes
- Country: United States
- Language: English

The Pace That Kills (also known as Cocaine Madness and The Cocaine Fiends) is a 1935 American exploitation film directed by William O'Connor. The film, starring Lois January, tells the story of Jane Bradford, who gets involved with a drug dealer and becomes addicted to cocaine.

== Plot ==
Small-town girl Jane Bradford (Lois January) falls for Nick (Noel Madison), a big-city guy who offers her a chance to escape her small-town life. He introduces her to "headache powder," which she later discovers is cocaine, and it turns out Nick is a drug dealer. By the time they reach the city, Jane is already hooked on the drug.

When Jane’s family hears nothing from her for a year, her brother Eddie (Dean Benton) comes to the city to search for her. Eddie finds work at a drive-in carhop and befriends Fanny (Sheila Bromley), a waitress who is one of Nick’s customers. Fanny becomes addicted to the "headache powder" and soon leads Eddie astray. Their downward spiral begins: both are fired and struggle to find new jobs. On the periphery of both Eddie and Jane's lives is Dorothy Farley (Lois Lindsay), a wealthy drive-in customer dating Dan (Charles Delaney), an undercover cop, watches from afar as Eddie and Jane’s lives unravel. Dorothy, who throws money around and offers financial help to those in need, becomes entangled in their chaotic world.

Fanny tells Eddie that she is pregnant. He tells her he really never loved her. Heartbroken, Fanny turns on the gas in her tenement, ending her life. The song "All I Want Is You" is sung at the nightclub. Dorothy’s father is exposed as a drug mobster. Jane, now going by 'Lil,' shoots and kills Nick as police arrive. Dan, revealed as an undercover cop, plans to marry Dorothy.

== Cast ==
- Lois January as Jane Bradford aka Lil
- Noel Madison as Nick - The Pusher
- Sheila Bromley as Fanny
- Dean Benton as Eddie Bradford
- Lois Lindsay as Dorothy Farley
- Charles Delaney as Dan - the Detective - Dorothy's Boyfriend
- Eddie Phillips as Manager of Dead Rat Club
- Frank Shannon as Mr. Farley
- Fay Holden as Madame / Henchwoman
- Maury Peck as himself - Master of Ceremonies
- Nona Lee as herself - Vocalist
- Gay Sheridan as Dorothy's Friend
- Frank Collins as himself - Singing Waiter

== Preservation status ==
- A copy is preserved in the Library of Congress collection.

== Production ==
Typical of the other films that Willis Kent produced during the 1920s, 1930s and 1940s was a string of low-budget westerns and exploitation films, thinly disguised as cautionary tales. The plot also dealt with amorality and prostitution. Production began November 9, 1935.

== Soundtrack ==
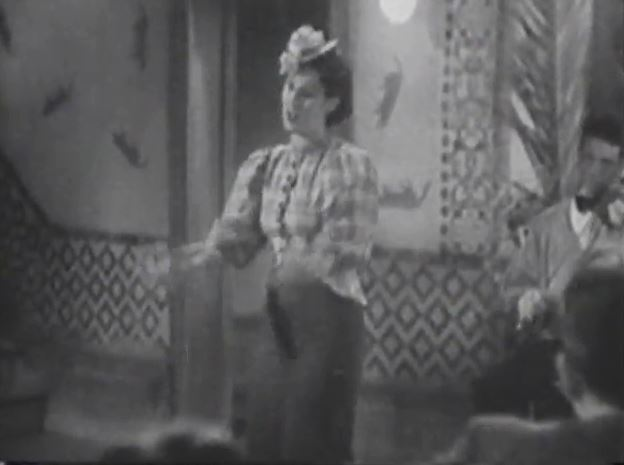
Nona Lee singing "All I Want Is You"

- Nona Lee - "All I Want Is You"
- Frank Collins - "Towsee Mongalay" (Written by Grahame Jones)

== Reception ==
The Pace That Kills was released without a Code seal from the Motion Picture Producers and Distributors of America (MPPDA) and distributed via "State Rights" where local sales agents would then sell rights to individual theaters. The theater operators would then play the film as often as they desired in an attempt to make as much profit as possible. The Pace That Kills was re-issued in 1937 as The Cocaine Fiends.

== Re-use of footage ==
Footage from the film, including the song "All I Want Is You," was re-used in Confessions of a Vice Baron (1943).
