= Forty Naughty Girls =

1937 film by Edward F. Cline

- Theatrical release poster
- Directed by: Edward F. Cline
- Screenplay by: John Grey; Harold Kusell
- Based on: The Riddle of the Forty Naughty Girls; 1934 story in Mystery by Stuart Palmer
- Produced by: William Sistrom
- Starring: James Gleason; ZaSu Pitts; Marjorie Lord; George Shelley; Joan Woodbury
- Cinematography: Russell Metty
- Edited by: John Lockert
- Music by: Roy Webb
- Production company: RKO Pictures
- Distributed by: RKO Pictures
- Release date: September 24, 1937
- Running time: 63 minutes
- Country: United States
- Language: English

Forty Naughty Girls is a 1937 American comedy mystery film directed by Edward F. Cline and written by John Grey. The film stars James Gleason, ZaSu Pitts, Marjorie Lord, George Shelley and Joan Woodbury. It is the sixth and final entry in RKO Pictures' series of Hildegarde Withers films. This film was the sixth film in the Hildegarde Withers-Oscar Piper series, and the second film in which ZaSu Pitts appeared as Hildegarde. Before Pitts, Edna May Oliver and Helen Broderick had played the role.

== Plot ==
The plot follows Inspector Oscar Piper and Hildegarde Withers as they attend a Broadway show, and get involved in a case where a press agent gets shot and an actor gets murdered live on stage.

== Cast ==
- James Gleason as Inspector Oscar Piper
- ZaSu Pitts as Hildegarde Withers
- Marjorie Lord as June Preston
- George Shelley as Bert
- Joan Woodbury as Rita Marlowe
- Frank M. Thomas as Jeff Plummer
- Tom Kennedy as Detective Casey
- Alan Edwards as Ricky Rickman
- Stephen Chase as Tommy Washburn
- Eddie Marr as Windy Bennett
- Ada Leonard as Lil
- Barbara Pepper as Alice

== Production notes ==
The role of Hildegarde Withers along with James Gleason as Inspector Oscar Piper was played by;

- The Penguin Pool Murder (1932), starring Edna May Oliver
- Murder on the Blackboard (1934), starring Edna May Oliver
- Murder on a Honeymoon (1935), starring Edna May Oliver (based on The Puzzle of the Pepper Tree, 1934)
- Murder on a Bridle Path (1936), starring Helen Broderick
- The Plot Thickens (1936), starring ZaSu Pitts
- Forty Naughty Girls (1937), starring ZaSu Pitts
