= The Plot Thickens (film) =

- Directed by: Ben Holmes
- Screenplay by: Jack Townley; Clarence Upson Young
- Based on: The Riddle of the Dangling Pearl; 1932 story by Stuart Palmer
- Produced by: Samuel J. Briskin; William Sistrom
- Starring: James Gleason; ZaSu Pitts; Owen Davis, Jr.
- Cinematography: Nicholas Musuraca
- Edited by: John Lockert
- Production company: RKO Radio Pictures
- Distributed by: RKO Radio Pictures
- Release date: December 11, 1936
- Running time: 69 minutes
- Country: United States
- Language: English

The Plot Thickens is a 1936 American mystery film directed by Ben Holmes starring James Gleason, ZaSu Pitts, Owen Davis, Jr., and Louise Latimer. Pitts plays the schoolteacher and amateur sleuth Hildegarde Withers from Stuart Palmer's 1932 novella The Riddle of the Dangling Pearl. Gleason reprised his role as Hildegarde's friendly nemesis, Inspector Oscar Piper, from RKO Radio Pictures' previous Hildegarde Withers films.

== Plot ==
The New York police are called in after the wealthy John Carter is murdered in his car at midnight. Among the suspects are his maid and chauffeur; his butler who has designs on the maid; and a young couple implicated at the crime scene. Schoolteacher and amateur sleuth Hildegarde Withers tags along with Inspector Oscar Piper of the homicide squad to follow up the clues. A second crime arises when a priceless jewel is stolen from a museum, and Withers has reason to believe the theft is connected with the Carter murder.

== Cast ==
- James Gleason as Oscar Piper
- ZaSu Pitts as Hildegarde Withers
- Owen Davis, Jr. as Bob Wilkins
- Louise Latimer as Alice Stevens
- Arthur Aylesworth as Kendall, the Butler
- Paul Fix as Joe, the Chauffeur
- Richard Tucker as John Carter
- Barbara Barondess as Marie, the Maid
- James Donlan as Jim, Piper's assistant
- Agnes Anderson as Dagmar, the Sculptor
- Oscar Apfel as H. G. Robbins, museum curator
- Lew Kelly as Officer Cassidy, astrology buff
- John T. Bambury as Midget (uncredited)

== Production ==
RKO Radio Pictures had been adapting novelist Stuart Palmer's Hildegarde Withers novels and short stories since 1932, with the patrician actress Edna May Oliver as Withers. She played the role so well that author Palmer altered the character in his books to reflect the Oliver portrayal. When Oliver left RKO in 1935, the studio selected Helen Broderick, who had displayed a dry, sardonic sense of humor in other pictures, to replace Oliver. Broderick made one Withers mystery (Murder on a Bridle Path) and made no further films in the series although she continued to work at RKO.

Filling the void was comedienne ZaSu Pitts. Pitts was a logical choice on paper—she seemed to fit the role of a prim, spinster schoolmarm, and the script was written in the Edna May Oliver idiom. However, Pitts played Withers in her usual, fluttery comic style with none of the dryness and slyness associated with her predecessors Oliver and Broderick.

== Reception ==
Some critics took the film more as a comedy than a mystery, with Gleason and Pitts seeming to function as a comedy team. The New York Times was perceptive: "It is a reasonably entertaining baffler, barring our faint wince at the sight of ZaSu Pitts trying to fill the saturnine shoes of the Hildegardes of Edna May Oliver and Helen Broderick. Probably as a concession to Miss Pitts's flutter, the usual acerbic exchanges between the inspector and Hildegarde have been blunted, becoming merely moderate sarcasms which really do not justify Mr. Gleason's exaggerated recoils. What he needs for flinching purposes is a Miss Oliver or Miss Broderick who knows how to pour the hot coals on." The New York Herald Tribune agreed: "ZaSu Pitts, who supplants Miss Oliver in the role of schoolteacher, is not, to this way of thinking, so perfect a lady detective as the original, but she manages to be, as always, a humorous, faintly mournful character, amusing enough." The Hollywood Spectator noted the comedy content: "[The film] makes Jim Gleason, the police inspector in charge of the case, dangerously dumb, but keeps him just sane enough to make it reasonable that he and ZaSu Pitts, also played for laughs, should solve the mystery and bring the murderer to justice."
