= James Gleason =

American actor (1882–1959)

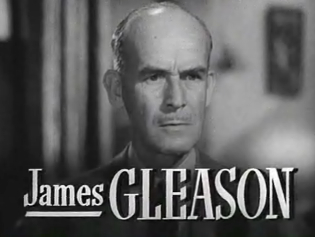
- Gleason in Meet John Doe (1941)
- Born: James Austin Gleason; May 23, 1882; New York City, U.S.
- Died: April 12, 1959 (aged 76); Woodland Hills, California, U.S.
- Occupations: Actor; playwright; screenwriter
- Years active: 1914–1959
- Spouse: Lucile Webster (m. 1905; died 1947)
- Children: Russell Gleason

James Austin Gleason (May 23, 1882 – April 12, 1959) was an American actor, playwright, and screenwriter born in New York City. Gleason often portrayed "tough-talking, world-weary guys with a secret heart-of-gold."

== Early life ==
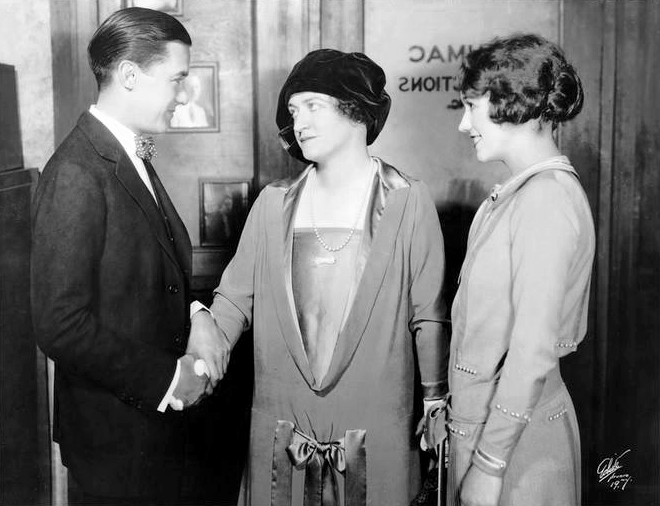
Gleason directed the Broadway production of George S. Kaufman's The Butter and Egg Man (1925), in which his wife Lucile Webster (center) appeared with Gregory Kelly and Sylvia Field.

Gleason was born in New York City, the son of Mina (née Crolius) and William L. Gleason. Coming from theatrical stock, as a schoolboy he made stage appearances while on holiday. He began earning his living at the age of 13, being a messenger boy, printer's devil, assistant in an electrical store, and a lift boy. He enlisted in the United States Army at age 16 and served three years in the Philippines.

== Career ==
On discharge, he began his stage career, later taking up acting professionally. He played in London for two years, and following his return to the United States, he began in films by writing dialogue for comedies. He wrote a number of plays, several of which were performed on Broadway. He also acted on Broadway, including in a few his own plays. When World War I broke out, Gleason re-enlisted in the U.S. Army and served to the end of the war.

His film debut was in Polly of the Follies (1922), starring Constance Talmadge. Balding and slender, with a craggy voice and a master of the double-take, Gleason portrayed tough but warm-hearted characters, usually with a New York background. He co-wrote The Broadway Melody, the second film to win the Academy Award for Best Picture, and had a small, uncredited role in it. He also co-wrote and briefly appeared as a hot dog vendor in the 1934 Janet Gaynor vehicle Change of Heart. He performed in a number of films with his wife Lucile.

Gleason was nominated for an Academy Award for Best Supporting Actor for his performance as boxing manager Max "Pop" Corkle in the 1941 film Here Comes Mr. Jordan. In the Frank Capra classic Meet John Doe (1941), he played the cynical, hardboiled editor brought in to pump up the newspaper that goes ahead with the "John Doe" story. In The Clock (1945), he played a milk cart driver who gives lessons in marriage to the characters played by Judy Garland and Robert Walker, while Lucile played his wife. The same year, he played the bartender in the film adaptation of A Tree Grows in Brooklyn. In The Bishop's Wife (1947), he was another cynic, this time a cab driver, thawed out by the warmth of passengers Cary Grant and Loretta Young. One of Gleason's best-known roles is Uncle Birdie, the kind-hearted ship captain plagued by alcohol and the memory of his deceased wife, in Charles Laughton's film noir classic The Night of the Hunter (1955).

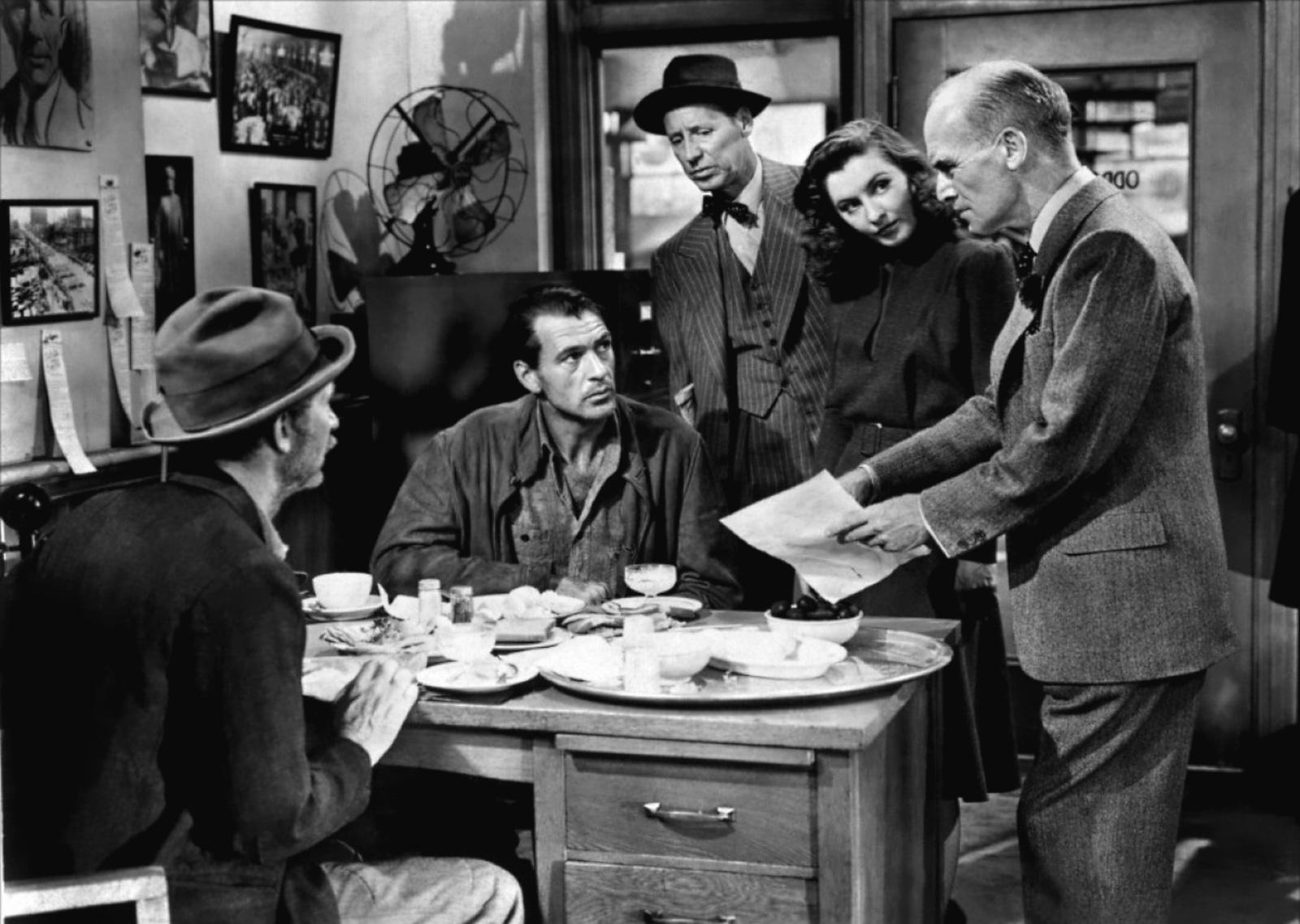
From Meet John Doe (1941), L-R: Walter Brennan, Gary Cooper, Irving Bacon, Barbara Stanwyck, and Gleason.

=== Movie series ===
James Gleason starred in four movie series. From 1932 to 1937, he co-starred in RKO's Hildegarde Withers mysteries, playing police inspector Oscar Piper in six features, starting with Penguin Pool Murder. When domestic comedies were being made by most of the studios (the Hardy family, the Jones Family, the Bumstead family, etc.), Republic Pictures launched the Higgins family, with Gleason as patriarch Joe Higgins and his wife Lucile and son Russell played Lil and Sydney Higgins, respectively. In 1941, RKO recruited James Gleason for its new detective series, The Falcon, casting the exasperated Gleason opposite the suave George Sanders. In 1951, after Leon Errol's death interrupted Monogram's Joe Palooka series, James Gleason replaced him as prizefight manager Knobby Walsh.

=== Other media ===
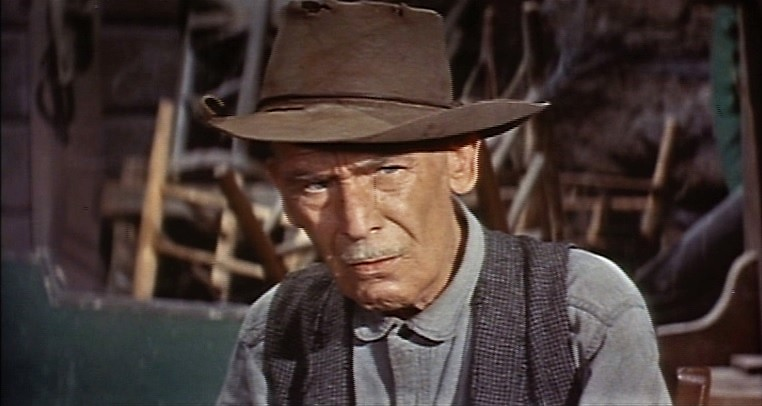
James Gleason in Money, Women and Guns, 1958

Gleason also performed in other media. In 1931, he co-starred with Robert Armstrong in the radio sitcom Gleason and Armstrong. His television credits include several episodes of Alfred Hitchcock Presents, the Reed Hadley legal drama The Public Defender and ABC's The Real McCoys. In "The Child", the Christmas 1957 episode of John Payne's The Restless Gun on NBC, Gleason and Anthony Caruso played Roman Catholic priests who run an orphanage.

For his contributions to the motion picture industry, Gleason has a star on the Hollywood Walk of Fame at 7038 Hollywood Boulevard.

== Personal life ==
James and Lucile Gleason had a son, actor Russell Gleason. On December 26, 1945, the younger Gleason was in New York City awaiting deployment to Europe with his regiment when he fell out of a fourth-story window in the Hotel Sutton — which the army had commandeered to house the troops — resulting in his death. Reports varied, some saying the fall was accidental, while others stating it was a suicide. Russell's most prominent role had been as Muller in the Academy Award-winning version of All Quiet on the Western Front (1930). Russell Gleason was married to Cynthia Hobart (later becoming Cynthia Lindsay), a swimmer and stuntwoman who later wrote a biography of family friend Boris Karloff.

In 1959, James Gleason died of asthmatic complications and was interred in the Holy Cross Cemetery in Culver City, California.

== Partial list of plays ==
- Pretty Mrs. Smith (1914)
- It Happens to Everybody (1919)
- The Five Million (1919)
- The Charm School (1920)
- Tangerine (1920)
- Like a King (1921)
- The Deep Tangled Wildwood (1923)
- The Lady Killer (1924)
- Is Zat So? (1924)
- The Fall Guy (1925)
- The Butter and Egg Man (1925)
- Pomeroy's Past (1926)
- Sure Fire (1926)
- The Shannons of Broadway (1927)
- Rain or Shine (1928)

== Filmography ==
=== Film ===
Year	Title	Role	Notes
1922	Polly of the Follies	Paul Gordon	
1928	The Count of Ten	The Manager	
1929	The Broadway Melody	Music Publisher	Uncredited, Dialogue co-written by Gleason
1929	High Voltage	N/A	Screenplay co-written by Gleason
1929	The Flying Fool	N/A	Dialogue written by Gleason
1929	Oh, Yeah!	Dusty Reilly	
1929	The Shannons of Broadway	Mickey Shannon	
1930	Puttin' On the Ritz	James "Jimmy" Tierney	Also credited with writing dialogue
1930	The Swellhead	Johnny Trump	
1930	Mammy	N/A	
1930	Dumbbells in Ermine	Mike	Screenplay by Gleason and Harvey F. Thew
1930	The Fall Guy	N/A	Based on the play by George Abbott and Gleason
1930	The Matrimonial Bed	Gustave Corton	
1930	Rain or Shine	N/A	Based on the musical by Gleason
1930	Her Man	Steve	
1930	What a Widow!	N/A	Co-wrote
1930	Big Money	Tom	
1931	Three Hollywood Girls	N/A	Screenplay by Gleason
1931	Beyond Victory	Private Jim Mobley	
1931	It's a Wise Child	Cool Kelly	
1931	A Free Soul	Eddie	
1931	Sweepstakes	Sleepy Jones	
1931	The Big Gamble	Squint Dugan	
1931	Suicide Fleet	Skeets	
1932	Fast Companions	Silk Henley	
1932	Lady and Gent	Pin Streaver	
1932	Blondie of the Follies	Pa McClune	
1932	The Crooked Circle	Arthur Crimmer	
1932	The All American	Chick Knipe	
1932	The Devil Is Driving	"Beef" Evans	
1932	The Penguin Pool Murder	Police Inspector Oscar Piper	
1933	The Billion Dollar Scandal	Ratsy Harris	
1933	Clear All Wires!	Lefty	
1933	Mister Mugg	N/A	Comedy short
1933	The Bowery	N/A	Screenplay co-written by Gleason
1933	Hoop-La	Jerry	
1934	The Meanest Gal in Town	Duke Slater	
1934	Search for Beauty	Dan Healy	
1934	Orders Is Orders	Ed Waggermeyer	
1934	Change of Heart	Hot Dog Vendor	Uncredited, Also credited as screenwriter
1934	Murder on the Blackboard	Inspector Oscar Piper	
1935	Helldorado	Sam Barnes	
1935	Two-Fisted	N/A	Based on the play Is Zat So? by Gleason
1935	Murder in the Fleet	Inspector Oscar Piper	Uncredited screenplay by Gleason
1935	Murder on a Honeymoon	Inspector Oscar Piper	
1935	West Point of the Air	Joe "Bags"	
1935	Hot Tip	Jimmy McGill	Co-directed with Ray McCarey
1935	We're Only Human	Detective Danny Walsh	
1936	Murder on a Bridle Path	Police Inspector Oscar Piper	
1936	The Ex-Mrs. Bradford	Inspector Corrigan	
1936	Yours for the Asking	Saratoga	
1936	Don't Turn 'Em Loose	Detective Daniels	
1936	The Big Game	George Scott	
1936	The Plot Thickens	Oscar Piper	
1937	Forty Naughty Girls	Inspector Oscar Piper	
1937	Manhattan Merry-Go-Round	Danny the Duck	
1938	The Higgins Family	Joe Higgins	
1938	Army Girl	Sergeant "Three Star" Hennessy	
1939	My Wife's Relatives	Joe Higgins	
1939	Should Husbands Work?	Joe Higgins	
1939	On Your Toes	Phil Dolan Sr.	
1939	The Covered Trailer	Joe Higgins	
1939	Money to Burn	Joe Higgins	
1940	Grandpa Goes to Town	Joe Higgins	
1940	Earl of Puddlestone	Joe Higgins	
1941	Meet John Doe	Henry Connell	
1941	Affectionately Yours	Chester Phillips	
1941	Here Comes Mr. Jordan	Max Corkle	Nominated — Academy Award for Best Supporting Actor
1941	Tanks a Million	Colonel "Spitfire" Barkley	
1941	Nine Lives Are Not Enough	Sergeant Daniels	
1941	Babes on Broadway	Thornton Reed	
1942	Hay Foot	Colonel J. A. Barkley	
1942	A Date with the Falcon	Inspector Mike O'Hara	
1942	My Gal Sal	Pat Hawley	
1942	The Falcon Takes Over	Inspector Michael O'Hara	
1942	Footlight Serenade	Bruce McKay	
1942	Tales of Manhattan	"Father" Joe	
1942	Manila Calling	Tim O'Rourke	
1943	Crash Dive	Chief Mike "Mac" McDonnell	
1943	A Guy Named Joe	"Nails" Kilpatrick	
1944	Once Upon a Time	McGillicuddy, aka the "Moke"	
1944	Arsenic and Old Lace	Police Lieutenant Rooney	
1944	The Keys of the Kingdom	Reverend Dr. Wilbur Fiske	
1945	This Man's Navy	Jimmy Shannon	
1945	A Tree Grows in Brooklyn	McGarrity	
1945	The Clock	Al Henry, Milk Cart Driver	
1945	Captain Eddie	Tom Clark	
1946	The Hoodlum Saint	Snarp	
1946	The Well Groomed Bride	Captain Hornby	
1946	Home, Sweet Homicide	Sergeant O'Hare	
1946	Lady Luck	Sacramento Sam	
1947	The Homestretch	Doc Kilborne	
1947	Down to Earth	Max Corkle	
1947	The Bishop's Wife	Sylvester	
1947	Tycoon	Pop Mathews	
1948	Smart Woman	Sam Corkle	
1948	The Dude Goes West	Sam Briggs	
1948	The Return of October	Uncle Willie Ramsey	
1948	When My Baby Smiles at Me	Lefty Moore	
1949	Bad Boy	Chief	
1949	The Life of Riley	Gillis	
1949	Take One False Step	Captain Gledhill	
1949	Miss Grant Takes Richmond	Timothy P. Gleason	
1950	Key to the City	Sergeant Hogan	
1950	The Yellow Cab Man	Mickey Corkins	
1950	Riding High	Racing Secretary	
1950	The Jackpot	Harry Summers	
1950	Joe Palooka in the Squared Circle	Knobby Walsh	
1951	Two Gals and a Guy	Max Howard	
1951	Joe Palooka in Triple Cross	Knobby Walsh	
1951	Come Fill the Cup	Charley Dolan	
1951	I'll See You in My Dreams	Fred Townsend	
1952	We're Not Married!	Duffy	
1952	The Story of Will Rogers	Bert Lynn	
1952	What Price Glory?	General Cokely	
1953	Forever Female	Eddie Woods	
1954	Hollywood Thrill-Makers	Risky Russell	
1954	Suddenly	Peter "Pop" Benson	
1955	The Night of the Hunter	Birdie Steptoe	
1955	The Girl Rush	Ether Ferguson	
1956	Star in the Dust	Orval Jones	
1957	Spring Reunion	"Collie" Collyer	
1957	Man in the Shadow	Hank James	
1957	Loving You	Carl Meade	
1958	The Female Animal	Tom Maloney	
1958	Man or Gun	Sheriff Jim Jackson	
1958	Rock-A-Bye Baby	Doc Simpkins	
1958	Once Upon a Horse...	Postmaster	
1958	Money, Women and Guns	Henry Devers	
1958	The Last Hurrah	"Cuke" Gillen	(final film role)

=== Television ===
Year	Title	Role	Notes
1956	Alfred Hitchcock Presents	Mr. Jorgy	Season 2 Episode 4: "Kill With Kindness"
1957	Alfred Hitchcock Presents	Howard Fieldstone	Season 2 Episode 22: "The End of Indian Summer"
1957	The Restless Gun	Father Terrance	Episode "The Child" (Christmas episode)
1957	Leave It to Beaver	Pete	Season 1 Episode 9: "The Clubhouse"

== See also ==
- List of actors with Academy Award nominations
