= Kenneth Macgowan =

American film producer (1888–1963)

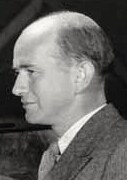
Macgowan in 1935

Kenneth Macgowan (November 30, 1888 – April 27, 1963) was an American film producer. He won an Academy Award for Best Color Short Film for La Cucaracha (1934), the first live-action short film made in the three-color Technicolor process.

== Biography ==
Born on November 30, 1888, in Winthrop, Massachusetts, Macgowan began his career as a drama critic. He wrote many books on modern theater, including The Theatre of Tomorrow (1921), Continental Stagecraft (1922) with Robert Edmond Jones, Masks and Demons (1923) with Herman Rosse, and Footlights Across America (1929). In 1922, he ran the Provincetown Playhouse as its producer, with Eugene O'Neill and Robert Edmond Jones as business partners. His close relationship with O'Neill lasted their lifetimes.

In 1928, he moved to Hollywood, California to become a story editor for the newly formed RKO Radio Pictures and quickly became an assistant producer. By 1932, Macgowan had become a film producer for RKO, including Little Women (1933), starring Katharine Hepburn, Joan Bennett, Frances Dee and Jean Parker as the March sisters.

Macgowan produced many films between 1932 and 1947, not only at RKO, but also for 20th Century Fox and Paramount Pictures. He produced the first feature film made in the three-color Technicolor process, Becky Sharp (1935). He also produced Young Mr. Lincoln (1939) with Henry Fonda, Fritz Lang's Man Hunt (1941) and Alfred Hitchcock's Lifeboat (1944).

Other films produced by Macgowan include The Penguin Pool Murder (1932), Double Harness (1933), Rafter Romance (1933), Murder on the Blackboard (1934), Murder on a Honeymoon (1935), Lloyd's of London (1936), Stanley and Livingstone (1939), The Story of Alexander Graham Bell (1939), and Jane Eyre (1944).

== Personal life ==
In 1947, he left the movie industry to become the first chair of the Department of Theater Arts at UCLA. The theater building on the school's campus is named in his honor. Throughout his life, he wrote books on several subjects, including drama and film, most notably Behind the Screen, a history of cinema published posthumously in 1965. He graduated from Harvard College in 1911.

He died on April 27, 1963, in West Los Angeles, California, aged 74.

== Selected filmography ==
- The Beloved Traitor (1918)
- Love and Hisses (1937)
