= Mrs. O'Malley and Mr. Malone =

1950 film by Norman Taurog

- Directed by: Norman Taurog
- Screenplay by: William Bowers
- Based on: Once Upon a Train; 1950 story in Ellery Queen's Mystery Magazine by Stuart Palmer; Craig Rice
- Produced by: William H. Wright
- Starring: Marjorie Main; James Whitmore
- Cinematography: Ray June
- Edited by: Gene Ruggiero
- Music by: Adolph Deutsch
- Production company: Metro-Goldwyn-Mayer
- Distributed by: Loew's, Inc.
- Release date: December 8, 1950
- Running time: 69 minutes
- Country: United States
- Language: English
- Budget: $592,000
- Box office: $915,000

Mrs. O'Malley and Mr. Malone is a 1950 comedy/murder mystery film set on board a train. It stars Marjorie Main and James Whitmore. It is based on the short story "Once Upon a Train (The Loco Motive)" by Stuart Palmer and Craig Rice.

== Plot ==
Montana housewife Hattie O'Malley boards a train bound for New York to collect a prize she has won from a radio program. Boarding in Chicago is criminal attorney John J. Malone, whose client, Steve Kepplar, just released from prison in Joliet, still owes him $10,000.

Suspicion exists that Kepplar himself will be on the train, heading to New York to retrieve $100,000 he previously stashed from a robbery. Chicago detective Tim Marino is a passenger. So is the ex-convict's business partner, Myron Brynk, and his moll, Lola.

Kepplar is indeed along for the ride, disguised as a sailor. Lola is in on it, hiding him in her compartment. But soon his dead body is found, followed by hers. More and more, the detective comes to believe lawyer Malone and even Hattie could be involved in this, but Brynk turns out to be the man he is after.

== Cast ==
- Marjorie Main as Harriet "Hattie" O'Malley
- James Whitmore as John J. Malone
- Ann Dvorak as Connie Kepplar
- Phyllis Kirk as Kay
- Fred Clark as Inspector Tim Marino
- Dorothy Malone as Lola Gillway
- Clinton Sundberg as Donald
- Douglas Fowley as Steve Kepplar
- Willard Waterman as Mr. Ogle
- Don Porter as Myron Brynk
- Jack Bailey as The Game Show Host
- Nancy Saunders as Joanie
- Basil Tellou as The Greek Passenger
- James Burke as The Train Conductor

== Story origins and pre-production ==
In the 1930s and '40s, MGM produced the "Thin Man" series of six films, based on Dashiell Hammett's novel. It was very popular with American audiences for all 13 years of its run.

In the late 1940s, MGM decided to try to repeat its success with the help of Craig Rice, one of the leading mystery writers of the time. She was famous for her stories featuring fast-talking lawyer John J. Malone, who often cut ethical corners while solving crimes. MGM also approached Stuart Palmer, another famous mystery writer of the era. Together, Rice and Palmer wrote a short story titled "Once Upon a Train (The Loco Motive)", teaming Malone with Palmer's most famous character, Hildegarde Withers, who had appeared previously in films in the 1930s. However, MGM replaced the character of Withers with that of "Mrs. O'Malley" due to copyright issues with the publisher of Palmer's stories.

Director Norman Taurog was chosen by MGM to direct the film adaptation, as it was a screwball comedy/mystery, a strength of his. However, instead of letting Palmer and Rice write the screenplay, he delegated the duties to William Bowers. Bowers' screenplay resembled the short story that Rice and Palmer had written, so the elements of comedy and mystery that Rice included in her works were preserved in the film adaptation.

== Reception ==
According to MGM records the film earned $772,000 in the US and Canada and $143,000 overseas, leading to a loss of $31,000.
