= Hot Tip =

1935 film directed by Ray McCarey & James Gleason

- Directed by: Ray McCarey; James Gleason
- Screenplay by: Hugh Cummings; Olive Cooper; Louis Stevens
- Based on: "Leander Clicks"; 1928 story in Red Book Magazine by William Slavens McNutt
- Produced by: William Sistrom
- Starring: ZaSu Pitts; James Gleason; Margaret Callahan; Russell Gleason
- Cinematography: Jack MacKenzie
- Edited by: James Morley
- Music by: Alberto Colombo
- Production company: RKO Radio Pictures
- Release date: September 6, 1935 (US)
- Running time: 72 minutes
- Country: United States
- Language: English

Hot Tip is a 1935 American comedy film directed by Ray McCarey and James Gleason from a screenplay by Hugh Cummings, Olive Cooper, and Louis Stevens, based on William Slavens McNutt's short story, "Leander Clicks", which had been published in the August 1928 edition of Red Book Magazine. Gleason also starred in the film, along with ZaSu Pitts, Margaret Callahan, and Russell Gleason (James' son). It was released by RKO Radio Pictures on September 6, 1935.

== Plot ==
Belle McGill is unaware of husband Jimmy's gambling problem. First he loses $100 at the racetrack and vows never to place another wager. Then he persuades future son-in-law Ben to bet on a sure thing, Leadpipe, but gets a tip on another horse just before the race, bets Ben's money on that instead, then watches Leadpipe win.

In danger of losing his business, if not his family, Jimmy delays paying off Ben, who excitedly believes his horse was the winner. Unbenknowst to all, Belle has been making bets of her own. When a horse called Honey Girl comes along, Belle and Jimmy risk everything they have, and they come out winners.

== Cast ==
- ZaSu Pitts as Belle
- James Gleason as Jimmy
- Margaret Callahan as Jane
- Russell Gleason as Ben

== Critical reception ==
Variety gave a negative review, writing that "laughs run few and far between" and the "story and direction never veers away from the obvious. Same goes for the performances." Pitts was criticized with the comment that she "does her usual assortment of handfluttering and starry eyed whining."

== See also ==
- List of films about horses
- List of films about horse racing
