= Murder on a Bridle Path =

1936 film by William Hamilton

- Directed by: William Hamilton; Edward Killy
- Written by: Dorothy Yost; Thomas L. Lennon; Edmund H. North; James Gow
- Based on: The Puzzle of the Red Stallion; 1936 novel by Stuart Palmer, also known as The Puzzle of the Briar Pipe
- Produced by: Samuel J. Briskin
- Starring: James Gleason; Helen Broderick; Louise Latimer
- Cinematography: Nicholas Musuraca
- Edited by: Jack Hively
- Music by: Roy Webb
- Production company: RKO Radio Pictures
- Distributed by: RKO Radio Pictures
- Release date: April 17, 1936
- Running time: 66 minutes
- Country: United States
- Language: English

Murder on a Bridle Path is a 1936 American mystery film directed by Edward Killy and William Hamilton, and starring James Gleason, Helen Broderick, and Louise Latimer. This film was the fourth production in the Hildegarde Withers series, and the only one in which Broderick played Hildegarde Withers.

== Plot ==
Violet Feverel is found dead in New York's Central Park early one morning. She had been riding a horse, and was apparently trampled to death. Inspector Oscar Piper of the homicide squad takes charge of the case, with schoolteacher and amateur detective Hildegarde Withers on the scene. Hildegarde notices blood on the horse, spoiling the "trampling" theory. They track the movements of Violet, described as an "evil woman" by one of her family circle, and find that several people were involved with Violet immediately before her death. Violet had quarreled with her sister Barbara; with Barbara's boyfriend Eddie; and with the raffish owner of the stable, Latigo Wells. Another suspect is Violet's ex-husband, Don Gregg, who is in jail for non-payment of alimony. Pat Gregg, Don's father, is a bedridden old man who keeps his own counsel. Completing the cast of characters are butler Chris Thomas and his crippled son Joey, and stablehand High Pockets. Oscar and Hildegarde discover clues independently, and compare notes to unravel the various motives and find the murderer.

== Cast ==
- James Gleason as Police Inspector Oscar Piper
- Helen Broderick as Hildegarde Withers
- Sheila Terry as Violet Feverel
- Louise Latimer as Barbara Foley, Violet's sister
- Owen Davis Jr. as Eddie Fry
- John Arledge as Joey Thomas
- John Carroll as Latigo Wells
- Leslie Fenton as Don Gregg
- Christian Rub as Chris Thomas
- Willie Best as High Pockets
- John Miltern as Pat Gregg
- Spencer Charters as Warden Sylvester Mahoney
- James Donlan as Detective Kane
- Gustav von Seyffertitz as Dr. Bloom, police medical examiner
- Frank Reicher as Dr. Peters, Pat Gregg's physician

== Production ==
Edna May Oliver had been starring as Hildegarde Withers in RKO's popular mystery series since 1932. By 1936 she had left the studio for Metro-Goldwyn-Mayer and was no longer available. She was replaced by RKO contractee Helen Broderick, a tart character actress known for sly remarks and snappy comebacks, which were hallmarks of the Withers series. Broderick played the role her own way, without imitating her predecessor.

Edward Killy, a forthright assistant director who once told off a stubborn Katharine Hepburn, and William Hamilton, the salty head of the studio's film editing department, were paired by the studio to co-direct a few features. Film Daily gave them and their latest picture high marks: "Good melodrama that should find favor with mystery fans. Excellently acted and well directed. Miss Broderick gets her sly humor over in fine shape and keeps audience interest from flagging. Direction of Edward Killy and William Hamilton keeps the action moving and the curiosity aroused. Direction excellent, photography excellent." Boxoffice Magazine wrote, "This one falls short of its predecessors in the department of wisecracking dialogue, but finished troupers like Gleason and Helen Broderick could make even the Congressional Record funny and they get the utmost out of their opportunities." Variety was more critical but gave Gleason and Broderick the benefit of the doubt: "On the surface it looks like too many cooks spoiled the picture. Four writers were concerned with the screenplay and two directors with the actual staging. It's a murder mystery that pulls its punches, showing how the fine comedy abilities of Helen Broderick and James Gleason can be thoroughly submerged by a poor script."

RKO continued with the Hildegarde Withers series but not with Broderick, who moved on to other RKO productions. She was succeeded by ZaSu Pitts.
