= Hildegarde Withers =

Fictional detective

- First appearance: The Penguin Pool Murder (1931)
- Last appearance: Hildegarde Withers Makes the Scene (1969)
- Created by: Stuart Palmer
- Portrayed by: Edna May Oliver; Helen Broderick; ZaSu Pitts; Agnes Moorehead; Eve Arden

In-universe information
- Gender: Female
- Occupation: Schoolteacher; Amateur sleuth
- Nationality: American

Hildegarde Withers is a fictional character, an amateur crime-solver in several novels, short stories and films. She was created by American mystery author Stuart Palmer (1905–1968).

== Character ==
Miss Withers "whom the census enumerator had recently listed as 'spinster, born Boston, age thirty-nine, occupation school teacher'" becomes an amateur sleuth in the first book of the series. Her adventures are usually comic but are nevertheless straightforward mysteries. She is a partial variation on Agatha Christie's Miss Marple. "A lean, angular spinster lady, her unusual hats and the black cotton umbrella she carries are her trademark. ... Hildegarde collects tropical fish, abhors alcohol and tobacco, and appears to have an irritable disposition. However, she is a romantic at heart and will extend herself to help young lovers." She collaborates, and frequently butts heads, with Inspector Oscar Piper, a high-ranking homicide detective in the New York Police Department.

== Film and television adaptations ==
Edna May Oliver is considered by fans of the film series the definitive Miss Withers. She starred in the first three screen adaptations, produced by RKO Radio Pictures:

- The Penguin Pool Murder (1932)
- Murder on the Blackboard (1934)
- Murder on a Honeymoon (1935), based on The Puzzle of the Pepper Tree (1934)

Author Palmer approved of Oliver's characterization so much that he gave the actress a mention in his Hollywood-based Withers novel The Puzzle of the Happy Hooligan.

When Oliver left RKO in 1935 to sign with Metro-Goldwyn-Mayer, RKO attempted to continue the series with Helen Broderick in Murder on a Bridle Path (1936), then ZaSu Pitts in The Plot Thickens (1936) and Forty Naughty Girls (1937), but Oliver was sorely missed and the films were poorly received.

Stuart Palmer collaborated with fellow mystery writer Craig Rice on several short stories that teamed Hildegarde Withers with Rice's lawyer-sleuth John J. Malone. This collaboration led to a Hollywood film, but due to contractual problems, Withers's character wound up being omitted from the movie. She was replaced by a feisty widow known as "Mrs. O'Malley". The film, a comic mystery released in 1950 as Mrs. O'Malley and Mr. Malone, starred James Whitmore and Marjorie Main as the title characters.

There was also a 1950s lost pilot for a television sitcom, Amazing Miss Withers, starring Agnes Moorehead and Paul Kelly.

In 1972, ABC made a Withers television movie, A Very Missing Person, with Eve Arden as Withers, James Gregory as Piper, and Julie Newmar. It was based on Hildegarde Withers Makes the Scene (1969), which was completed by Fletcher Flora after Palmer's death. It was well-received but there were no sequels.

== Novels ==
- The Penguin Pool Murder (1931)
- Murder on Wheels (1932)
- Murder on the Blackboard (1932)
- The Puzzle of the Pepper Tree (1933)
- The Puzzle of the Silver Persian (1934)
- The Puzzle of the Red Stallion (1935) [also published as "The Puzzle of the Briar Pipe"]
- The Puzzle of the Blue Banderilla (1937)
- The Puzzle of the Happy Hooligan (1941)
- Miss Withers Regrets (1947)
- Four Lost Ladies (1949)
- The Green Ace (1950) [also published as "At One Fell Swoop"]
- Nipped in the Bud (1951) [also published as "Trap for a Redhead"]
- Cold Poison (1954) [also published as "Exit Laughing"]
- Hildegarde Withers Makes the Scene (1969), completed by Fletcher Flora after Palmer's death

== Short story collections ==
- The Riddles of Hildegarde Withers (1947)
- The Monkey Murder and other Tales (1950)
- The People Vs. Withers and Malone (1963), written with Craig Rice, crossover with Rice's John J. Malone character
- Hildegarde Withers: Uncollected Riddles (2002)
- The Cases of Hildegarde Withers (2012)
- Hildegarde Withers: Final Riddles? (2021)

== Short fiction ==
- "The Riddle of the Dangling Pearl"
- "The Riddle of the Flea Circus"
- "The Riddle of the Forty Costumes"
- "The Riddle of the Brass Band"
- "The Riddle of the Yellow Canary"
- "The Riddle of the Blueblood Murders"
- "The Riddle of Forty Naughty Girls"
- "The Riddle of the Hanging Men"
- "The Riddle of the Black Spade"
- "The Riddle of the Marble Blade"
- "The Riddle of the Whirling Lights"
- "The Bill in the Saucer"
- "The Riddle of the Doctor's Double"
- "The Riddle of the Jack of Diamonds"
- "A Fingerprint in Cobalt"
- "The Riddle of the Purple Postcards"
- "The Riddle of the Beggar on Horseback"
- "Miss Withers and the Unicorn"
- "The Riddle of the Green Ice"
- "The Puzzle of the Scorned Woman"
- "The Hungry Hippo"
- "To Die in the Dark"
- "The Riddle of the Twelve Amethysts"
- "SNAFU Murder"
- "The Riddle of the Black Museum"
- "The Monkey Murder"
- "The Riddle of the Double Negative"
- "The Long Worm"
- "Fingerprints Don't Lie"
- "The Riddle of the Tired Bullet"
- "Once Upon a Train"
- "Where Angels Fear to Tread"
- "Cherchez la Femme"
- "The Jinx Man"
- "Four Lost Ladies"
- "Rift in the Loot"
- "Hildegarde and the Spanish Cavalier"
- "You Bet Your Life"
- "Withers and Malone, Brain-Stormers"
- "Who is Sylvia?"
- "Withers and Malone, Crime-Busters"
- "The Return of Hildegarde Withers"
- "Hildegarde Withers Is Back"
- "Hildegarde Plays It Calm"
