= Nurse Edith Cavell =

1939 film by Herbert Wilcox

- Directed by: Herbert Wilcox; James Anderson (assistant); Lloyd Richards (assistant)
- Screenplay by: Michael Hogan
- Based on: Dawn; 1928 novel by Reginald Berkeley
- Produced by: Herbert Wilcox; Merrill G. White (associate)
- Starring: Anna Neagle; Edna May Oliver; George Sanders; May Robson; ZaSu Pitts
- Cinematography: F. A. Young; Joseph H. August
- Edited by: Elmo Williams
- Music by: Anthony Collins
- Production company: Imperadio Pictures
- Distributed by: RKO Radio Pictures
- Release dates: September 22, 1939 (Premiere-New York City); September 29, 1939 (US)
- Running time: 98 minutes
- Country: United States
- Language: English
- Budget: $508,000
- Box office: $1,082,000

Nurse Edith Cavell is a 1939 American war drama film directed by British director Herbert Wilcox about Edith Cavell. The film was nominated at the 1939 Oscars for Best Original Score.

== Plot ==
The story follows the broadly true story of Edith Cavell who went to German-occupied Brussels after the onset of the First World War.

Edith hides the young Frenchman Jean Rappard, but is suspected of this and her hospital is inspected by German troops at regular intervals. Jean is put on a canal barge and despite being searched at the border escapes successfully.

Back in Brussels a firing squad executes a dozen escaped prisoners who were caught in the woods. Edith and Albert go to try to find wounded on a battlefield near the woods and bring back four British men including Pte Bungey of the Buffs. They are hidden in the hospital in a secret room accessed through a wardrobe in the basement boiler room. The Countess goes to the cobbler to organise their safe transportation.

Meanwhile, Edith also tends the young dying Germans in the main hospital. A further three Frenchmen are sent to the border by barge with Mme Moulin.

An alleged escaped French PoW arrives at the Countess's mansion. The Countess is suspicious due to his accent and locks him in the kitchen whilst informing the German authorities. The hospital is also being watched. Nevertheless, the numbers increase ... but they include Wilhelm Schultz of the German military intelligence. He therefore works out how Edith and the Countess operate. Each person is given new ID papers and money.

On 5 August 1915 Edith is arrested and placed in the Prison of St Gilles. A campaign begins to release her, but the Germans wish to "set an example" and wish her shot.

In the court she is charged with the far more serious crime of espionage. The very young Francois Rappard is brought into the court (in handcuffs) as the critical non-military witness. The authorities point out that the people who were helped returned to the front and killed Germans. Edith admits to having had helped at least 200 men escape. The three military judges go to decide her sentence. She is read the sentence in her cell by Cpt. Heinrichs: she is to be shot at dawn.

The authorities are evasive when they are asked by the British consul to give the result of the trial. Pleas for clemency are ignored.

Some of the proposed firing squad say they are ill as they do not wish to shoot a woman. But on the allotted morning eight soldiers shoot her dead.

On May 15, 1919, a memorial service is held in Westminster Abbey.

== Cast ==
- Anna Neagle as Nurse Edith Cavell
- Edna May Oliver as Countess de Mavon
- George Sanders as Capt. Heinrichs
- May Robson as Mme. Rappard
- ZaSu Pitts as Mme. Moulin
- H. B. Warner as Hugh Gibson
- Sophie Stewart as Sister Williams
- Mary Howard as Nurse O'Brien
- Robert Coote as Private Bungey
- Martin Kosleck as Pierre
- Gui Ignon as Cobbler
- Lionel Royce as Gen. von Ehrhardt
- Jimmy Butler as Jean Rappard
- Rex Downing as François Rappard
- Henry Brandon as Lt. Schultz
- Fritz Leiber as Edith's defence lawyer
- Ernst Deutsch as the Chief Prosecutor
- Halliwell Hobbes as the pastor who gives the last rites

== Reception ==
The film made a profit of $38,000. Modern Screen gave the film 4 out of 4 stars, stating that the film was "a powerful message against war and hatred", and that it maintained its level of suspense throughout the course of the picture. They praised the acting, particularly that of Anna Neagle in the title role, as well as May Robson, Edna May Oliver, and ZaSu Pitts, in their roles of women who aid the fleeing soldiers. The performance of Rex Downing was called "notable", and that of Lionel Royce was described as "stand-out". Also commended were George Sanders, Mary Howard, Sophie Stewart and H.B. Warner. The magazine was especially enthusiastic of Herbert Wilcox's direction, in that he managed to make every part credible, and even the roles of the "heavies" managed to be shown with compassion and understanding.

== Awards and nominations ==
| Year | Award | Category | Recipient(s) and nominee(s) | Result |
|---|---|---|---|---|
| 1940 | Academy Awards | Best Music, Score | Anthony Collins | Nominated |

== See also ==
- The Martyrdom of Nurse Cavell (1916)
- Nurse Cavell (1916)
- The Woman the Germans Shot (1918)
- Dawn (1928)
