= Oh, Yeah! (1929 film) =

1929 film

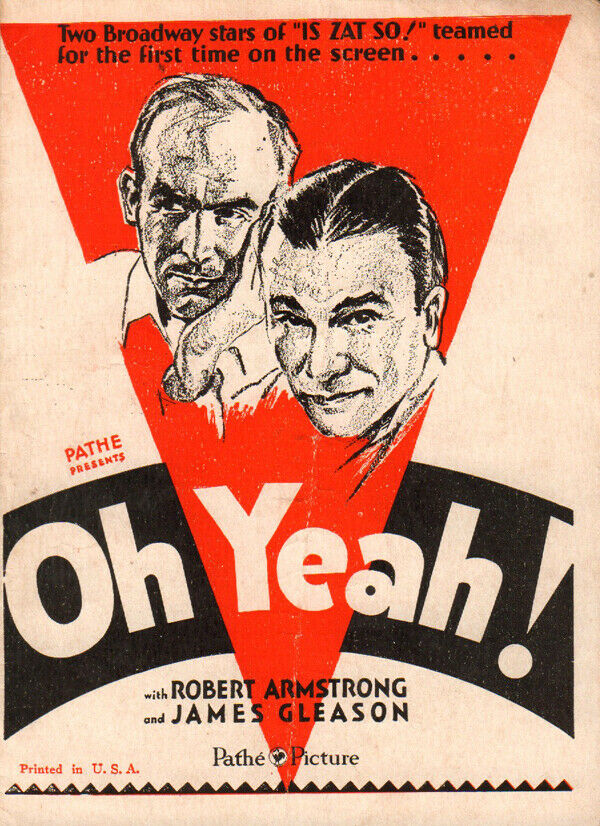
- Directed by: Tay Garnett
- Written by: Tay Garnett; James Gleason
- Based on: No Brakes by A.W. Somerville
- Starring: Robert Armstrong; James Gleason; Zasu Pitts
- Cinematography: Arthur C. Miller
- Edited by: Claude Berkeley
- Production company: Pathé Exchange
- Distributed by: Pathé Exchange
- Release date: October 19, 1929
- Running time: 74 minutes
- Country: United States
- Language: English

Oh, Yeah! (also written as Oh, Yeah?) is a 1929 American pre-Code action film directed by Tay Garnett and starring Robert Armstrong, James Gleason and Zasu Pitts. The film's sets were designed by the art director Edward C. Jewell. An early sound film, it was made during the transition from the silent era. It is also known by the alternative title No Brakes after the original story it is based on that appeared in The Saturday Evening Post.

== Cast ==
The film

- Robert Armstrong as Dude Cowan
- James Gleason as Dusty Reilly
- Patricia Caron as Pinkie
- Zasu Pitts as The Elk
- Budd Fine as Pop Eye
- Frank Hagney as Hot Foot
- Harry Tyler as Splinters
- Paul Hurst as Railroad-Yard Superintendent
- Bobby Dunn as Railroad Man at Bonfire

== Music ==
The theme song for the film is entitled "Love Found Me (When I Found You)" and was composed by George Waggner and George Green.

== See also ==
- List of early sound feature films (1926–1929)

== Bibliography ==
- Munden, Kenneth White. The American Film Institute Catalog of Motion Pictures Produced in the United States, Part 1. University of California Press, 1997.
