= William Sistrom =

English film producer (1884–1972)

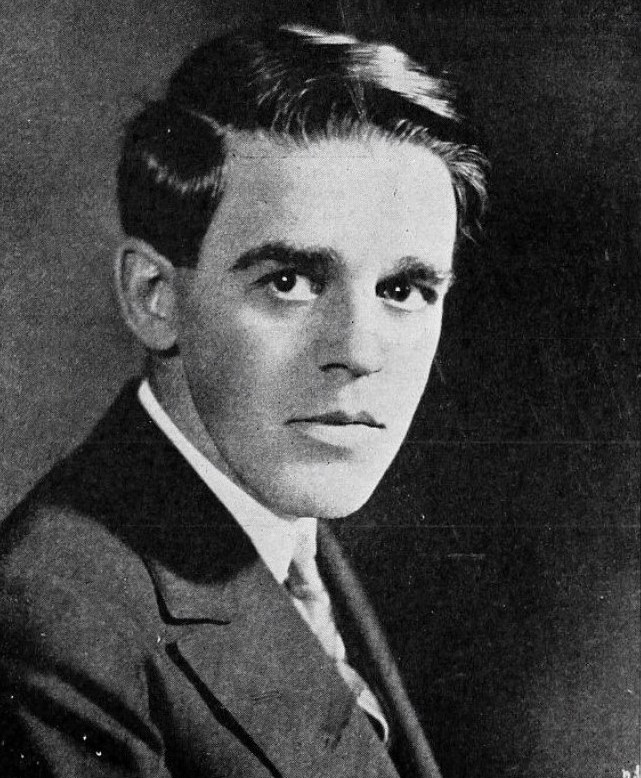
- From a 1925 magazine
- Born: March 19, 1884; Lincolnshire, England
- Died: March 1972; Los Angeles, United States
- Occupation: film producer

William "Billy" Sistrom (19 March 1884 – March 1972) was an English film producer who worked in the United States.

== Biography ==
Sistrom was born in Lincolnshire, England. He began work with Universal Pictures. Later he joined RKO Pictures in 1935, where he worked on the film adaptation of Leslie Charteris' The Saint in New York. He produced 30 British and American films between 1930 and 1949.

As well as a producer, William also worked as a studio manager. Actor Lon Chaney, Sr. tells of confronting Universal studio manager William Sistrom in 1918 demanding a payrise and contract. According to Chaney, Sistrom told him that he knew a good actor when he saw one but that, looking directly at Chaney, he saw only a wash-out. According to their website, William managed the Hollywood Center Studios for a time starting in 1925.

Wiliam's first wife Louise Rowan had two American-born sons and three daughters microbiologist William, Hollywood producer Joseph, Suzanne, Rosemary, and Mary Louise.

During World War II, the Sistroms opened their Hollywood home to many American servicemen. One notable Army Air Corps pilot and wannabe actor was Dan David. Dan assumed Mrs. Sistrom's maiden name as a stage name and was known as Dan Rowan. He was member of the comedy team of the 1970s television comedy show Rowan and Martin's Laugh-In.

After Louise's death he married actress Rosalyn Boulter when he was 68 and she was 36. Boulter's daughter Carol Haynes Johnson, who was 8 when they married, described William as "gentle, loving, giving. I always called him 'Daddy.' Daddy came into our lives when I was about 4." After the wedding, William retired, and the family moved to Phoenix, Arizona, where he managed a turkey ranch in Buckeye, about 40 mi (64 km) outside the city.

He died in March 1972 in Los Angeles, United States.

== Partial filmography ==
As producer unless otherwise specified.

- Runaway Bride (1930) (associate producer)
- The Fall Guy (1930) (associate producer)
- The Silver Horde (1930) (associate producer)
- The Black Camel (1931) (associate producer)
- The Spider (1931) (associate producer)
- The Crooked Circle (1932)
- While Paris Sleeps (1932)
- A Dog of Flanders (1935) (associate producer)
- Murder on a Bridle Path (1936) (associate producer)
- Bunker Bean (1936) (associate producer)
- The Plot Thickens (1936) (associate producer)
- There Goes My Girl (1937)
- Forty Naughty Girls (1937)
- The Saint in New York (1938)
- Blond Cheat (1938)
- I'm From the City (1938)
- The Saint in London (1939)
- The Saint's Vacation (1941)
- Dangerous Moonlight (1941)
- The Saint Meets the Tiger (1943)
- Escape to Danger (1943)
- Tawny Pipit (1944)
- Hungry Hill (1947)
- Woman Hater (1948)
