= Murder on a Honeymoon =

1935 film by Lloyd Corrigan

- Theatrical release poster
- Directed by: Lloyd Corrigan
- Screenplay by: Seton I. Miller; Robert Benchley
- Based on: The Puzzle of the Pepper Tree by Stuart Palmer
- Produced by: Kenneth Macgowan; David Hempstead
- Starring: Edna May Oliver; James Gleason
- Cinematography: Nick Musuraca
- Edited by: William Morgan
- Music by: Alberto Colombo (musical director)
- Distributed by: RKO Radio Pictures
- Release date: February 22, 1935
- Running time: 74 minutes
- Country: United States
- Language: English

Murder on a Honeymoon is a 1935 American mystery film starring Edna May Oliver and James Gleason. This was the third and last time Oliver portrayed astute schoolteacher Hildegarde Withers; the two previous films were The Penguin Pool Murder (1932) and Murder on the Blackboard (1934). The film was directed by Lloyd Corrigan from a screenplay by Seton I. Miller and Robert Benchley based on the 1933 novel The Puzzle of the Pepper Tree by Stuart Palmer. Palmer's novel, however, did not include Inspector Piper, and has Withers doing the investigating on her own.

== Plot ==
On a short flight to Catalina Island off the California coast, Roswell T. Forrest gets sick. When he is found dead upon landing, it appears to be murder to fellow passenger Hildegarde Withers, but she has a tough time convincing local police chief Britt and coroner Dr. O'Rourke.

When she contacts her friend, Police Inspector Oscar Piper, for more information about the deceased, he recognizes the name: the man was a vital witness in a case against a crime syndicate and had a price on his head of $10,000. He flies from New York to assist her in investigating the case and protect her from mob retribution.

When he arrives, the pair argue over which of the people aboard the plane is the killer:

- Joseph B. Tate, a famous Hollywood director,
- struggling actress Phyllis La Font, who is angling for a part in Tate's next movie,
- honeymooners Kay and Marvin Deving,
- Captain Beegle, a retired, self-confessed former rum runner, and
- pilots Dick French and Madden.

Withers suspects poisoning – Forrest had been given a drink, a cigarette, and even a dose of smelling salts by Withers herself – but before this can be confirmed, the body is stolen. While Piper questions those involved, Withers discovers that McArthur, the gangster who had offered the reward for Forrest's death, has registered at the hotel under the flimsy alias of Arthur Mack. When she eavesdrops on his telephone conversation, she learns that he will be leaving an envelope for someone. She purloins it from the mailbox and finds $10,000 inside.

More murders occur. Marvin Deving is shot and killed just before he can reveal some information to Piper. Meanwhile, Withers and Piper learn that the first victim was not Forrest, but his bodyguard Tom Kelsey. He and the real Forrest had switched identities.

After McArthur confronts Withers at gunpoint, trussing her up and putting her in the closet, from which she is rescued by Piper, McArthur is also found dead. Although it was staged to look like a suicide, Withers notices that the pistol in his hand is not his own.

When an employee complains that the fish in the hotel pond are all dead, Withers finds a pack of cigarettes discarded nearby; one of the cigarettes had fallen into the water, poisoning and killing the fish. With the murder weapon found, all the pieces come together. Withers takes Piper to see the grieving Kay. She offers the widow a cigarette, then casually mentions where she got it. When Kay refuses to smoke it, Withers tells Piper that McArthur's gun must be in the room. Kay pulls it out and tells them that she will have to kill them both now, but Withers manages to distract her, enabling Piper to disarm her. It turns out that the Devings thought they had been doublecrossed by McArthur when they did not receive their reward for committing murder, unaware that Withers had taken it. When Marvin tried to betray McArthur in return, he was killed by his employer, and Kay then killed McArthur.

== Cast ==
- Edna May Oliver as Hildegarde Withers
- James Gleason as Inspector Oscar Piper
- Lola Lane as Phyllis La Font
- George Meeker as Roswell T. Forrest, posing as Tom Kelsey
- Dorothy Libaire as Kay Deving
- Harry Ellerbe as Marvin Deving
- Chick Chandler as Dick French, pilot
- Willie Best as Willie, the porter
- Leo G. Carroll as Director Joseph B. Tate
- DeWitt Jennings as Captain Beegle
- Spencer Charters as Chief Britt
- Arthur Hoyt as Dr. O'Rourke
- Matt McHugh as Pilot Madden
- Morgan Wallace as McArthur / Arthur Mack
- Brooks Benedict as Tom Kelsey, posing as Roswell T. Forrest

Cast notes:

- Gleason played the role of Inspector Piper in all 6 films in the series.

== Production ==
The working title for Murder on a Honeymoon was Puzzle of the Pepper Tree, which was the title of the 1933 Stuart Palmer novel on which it was based.

Some scenes for the film were shot on Santa Catalina Island, a well-known resort 26 miles off the California coast.

A Douglas Dolphin twin-engine flying boat appears early in the movie; the characters fly on it to get to Catalina Island, and the (first) murder takes place on it.
