= The Penguin Pool Murder =

1932 film

- Theatrical release poster
- Directed by: George Archainbaud; Ray Lissner (assistant)
- Screenplay by: Lowell Brentano (story); Willis Goldbeck (screenplay)
- Based on: The Penguin Pool Murder; 1931 novel by Stuart Palmer
- Produced by: Kenneth Macgowan
- Starring: Edna May Oliver
- Cinematography: Henry W. Gerrard
- Edited by: Jack Kitchin
- Music by: Max Steiner
- Distributed by: RKO Radio Pictures
- Release date: December 9, 1932
- Running time: 66 minutes
- Country: United States
- Language: English

The Penguin Pool Murder is a 1932 American pre-Code comedy/mystery film starring Edna May Oliver as Hildegarde Withers, a witness in a murder case at the New York Aquarium, with James Gleason as the police inspector in charge of the case, who investigates with her unwanted help, and Robert Armstrong as an attorney representing Mae Clarke, the wife of the victim. Oliver's appearance was the first film appearance of the character of Hildegarde Withers, the schoolteacher and sleuth based on the character from the 1931 novel The Penguin Pool Murder by Stuart Palmer. It is the first in a trilogy including Murder on the Blackboard, and Murder on a Honeymoon, in which Oliver and Gleason team up for the lead roles.

== Plot ==
Gwen Parker meets her former boyfriend Philip Seymour at the local aquarium, and asks him for some money so she can leave her husband, stockbroker Gerald Parker; but Mr. Parker receives an anonymous telephone call tipping him off to the rendezvous. When he confronts the pair, Seymour knocks him out with a punch. As no witnesses see the altercation, he hides the unconscious man in the room behind an exhibit.

Schoolteacher Hildegarde Withers takes her class on a field trip to the aquarium. She helps stop a pickpocket, "Chicago" Lew, by tripping him with her umbrella, but he slips away. Soon afterward, she loses her hatpin; one of her students finds it. Then she sees Parker's corpse falling into a pool housing a penguin.

Police Inspector Oscar Piper arrives and uncovers several suspects: the widow and Seymour; Bertrand Hemingway, the head of the aquarium, who had financial dealings with the deceased; and Chicago Lew, found hiding near the scene. Lawyer Barry Costello, a bystander, catches Gwen Parker when she faints, and acquires a client when she is taken in for questioning. He also becomes Seymour's lawyer.

Miss Withers makes herself useful to Piper by taking notes on his interviews and her observations, typing them up for him, calling attention to points he has missed, and making him a meal. He is appreciative enough to not object when she continues to insert herself into his investigation. However, she herself later becomes a suspect when it is determined that her hatpin was driven through the man's right ear into his brain.

Seymour confesses to protect Mrs. Parker, but Miss Withers does not believe him. She convinces Piper to notify the press that the murder was committed with a thrust through the left ear.

Later, Costello passes along a message from Chicago Lew, in which he claims to know the identity of the killer. When Piper and Miss Withers go to see him at the jail, though, they find him dead from hanging. Costello demonstrates a way in which Seymour could have escaped from his nearby cell using a duplicate key (which is found), strangled Lew, and hanged him with wire without entering Lew's cell.

At the murder trial of Philip Seymour and Gwen Parker, Costello questions Miss Withers, but slips up, showing that he knew that Gerald Parker was killed via the right ear. He phoned the tip to Seymour and killed him because he is Gwen's lover and wanted her to himself.

When Gwen Parker is released, the waiting Seymour slaps her in the face, to the amusement of Piper and Miss Withers. Piper then unexpectedly asks Miss Withers to marry him. She accepts. (In the sequel, Murder on the Blackboard, they are still single.)

== Cast ==
- Edna May Oliver as Miss Hildegarde Martha Withers
- Robert Armstrong as Barry Costello
- James Gleason as Inspector Oscar Piper
- Mae Clarke as Gwen Parker
- Donald Cook as Philip Seymour
- Edgar Kennedy as Policeman Donovan
- Clarence Wilson as Bertrand B. Hemingway
- James Donlan as Security Guard Fink
- Gustav von Seyffertitz as Von Donnen/Dr Max Bloom
- Joe Hermano as Chicago Lew
- Guy Usher as Gerald Parker
- Rochelle Hudson as Parker's Telephone Operator
- Wilfrid North as The Judge

Cast notes

- Oliver reprised her role in two sequels, Murder on the Blackboard (1934) and Murder on a Honeymoon (1935)
- Gleason played the role of Piper in all six films in the series.

== Reception ==
The film received mixed reviews in 1932. In his assessment of the production on December 27, Mordaunt Hall of The New York Times describes it as "a series of hilarious doings in which Miss Oliver has a jolly time." Hall, though, contends that the film's frequent "levity" fails to be counterbalanced by an engaging or even moderately challenging mystery:

"The Penguin Pool Murder"...is a humorous murder story which stirs up quite a good deal of interest, but scarcely comes up to expectations in its dénouement. However, it is one of those comicalities that possesses a good share of fun and therefore the murder mystery is, to the audience, not of great consequence.
