= Beyond Victory =

1931 film direct by John S. Robertson

- Title card for the film
- Directed by: John Robertson
- Written by: Horace Jackson; James Gleason
- Produced by: E. B. Derr
- Starring: Bill Boyd; James Gleason; Lew Cody; ZaSu Pitts
- Cinematography: Norbert Brodine
- Edited by: Daniel Mandell
- Music by: Francis Groman
- Production company: RKO Pathé
- Release date: April 12, 1931 (US)
- Running time: 70 minutes
- Country: United States
- Language: English
- Budget: $600,000

Beyond Victory is a 1931 American pre-Code war film starring Bill Boyd, James Gleason, Lew Cody, and ZaSu Pitts. While John Robertson received directing credit, Edward H. Griffith supposedly took extensive re-takes after production ended and the film was deemed not audience ready. Two actresses with major roles in the original version were completely cut from the final release, Helen Twelvetrees and June Collyer. The original screenplay was written by Horace Jackson and James Gleason. While the film might not have made a profit at the box office, it was well received by critics.

== Plot ==
On the Western Front during World War I, an American battalion advances to the French town of Nevremont, where it is outflanked. Sergeant Bill Thatcher is left in charge of a small rear guard of four men to cover the battalion's retreat before it is cut off. During heavy shelling, Bill tries to comfort his men after each is wounded. The first, "Bud", relates his story of how he joined the military, leaving the family farm to enlist, despite his mother's pleas for him not to become involved in foreign conflicts. As he finishes his story, he dies.

The second doughboy, Lew Cavanaugh, is a New York playboy who used enlistment as a way to have a final night of pleasure with one of his conquests, never realizing that he would die on a French battlefield. The third American, the unsoldierly Jim Mobley, is not as badly wounded as the other two soldiers and tells his story of his wife's displeasure after he announces his intention to enlist and his own consternation at his inability explain to her why. Thatcher then relates his own story, where he was engaged to a German immigrant back in the United States but did not wed her due to their differences over the "Great War".

Shortly after, the Germans attack again, during which Bill and Jim defend their position and blow up a bridge to cover the retreat of their battalion, but are badly wounded. A German soldier tries to bayonet the unconscious Bill but is stopped by another soldier. Both are captured and sent to a German hospital, where Bill is discovered by his erstwhile fiancé, Katherine. She saves his life by persuading the German doctor to allow Bill, slowly bleeding to death but not allowed a transfusion because too many German patients are in need of one, to be transfused with her blood. After the armistice, with Bill recovered and decorated along with Jim for the defense of Nevremont, they celebrate the end of the fighting with Katherine.

== Cast ==
- Bill Boyd as Sergeant Bill Thatcher
- James Gleason as Private Jim Mobley
- Lew Cody as Lew Cavanaugh
- ZaSu Pitts as Mademoiselle Fritzi
- Marion Shilling as Ina
- Russell Gleason as Russell ("Bud")
- Lissi Arna as Katherine
- Mary Carr as Mother
- Fred Scott as Fred
- Theodore Von Eltz as Major Sparks

(Cast list as per AFI database)

== Production ==
The film was announced as part of Pathé Exchange's 30-picture schedule for 1930–31 in February 1930. It was considered the premier film of Pathé's schedule for the season. Boyd was attached to the project by the end of February, as part of his new deal with Pathé, in which he would only appear in Pathé "specials". Beyond Victory was to be the first film of that new deal. James Gleason was added to the cast in a featured role in March 1930. It was the first film for Gleason under his new exclusive long-term contract with Pathé. At the same time, it was revealed that John Robinson would be helming the film. Robert Armstrong was attached to the picture in early April. Also in early April, it was announced that Mauri Grashin had been signed as screenwriter to a long-term contract by Pathé, and Beyond Victory would be his first project. In June 1930, it was reported that Dorothy Burgess had been signed for a featured role in the film, and Zasu Pitts involvement with the picture as a knife-throwing entertainer was revealed, along with James Gleason's participation. In mid-June, Charles O'Loughlin was announced as the sound engineer on the project, although the final version included work from four sound engineers. The Film Daily reported that the film's producer, E.B. Derr, in conjunction with the director, John Robertson, took an unusual step and had each sequence in the film written by a different screenwriter. The writers included James Seymour, James Gleason, Lynn Riggs, Thomas Lennon, Mauri Grashin, and Garret Fort. The concept was to have five independent stories intertwined around a central theme. In Glason's adaptation, he wrote a role into the final version of the script for himself. By early May pre-production on the film was almost completed. And production on the film had begun by the middle of May. Also in May, the film was scheduled to be released on July 13, 1930.

In early June, Robert Armstrong was replaced by Lew Cody. Armstrong was delayed on the production of Railroad Man. By June 15, 1930, the cast had grown to include William Boyd, Fred Scott, James Gleason, Russell Gleason, June Collyer, Helen Twelvetrees, Zasu Pitts, Purnell Pratt, and Bert Roach. The following week, Richard Tucker was added to the cast. Production on the film was almost complete by the end of June. On June 26, the final cast list was reported. Additions to the cast were: William Holden, E.H. Calvert, Fred Walton, Wade Boteler, Rockliffe Fellowes, Helen Baxter, George Stone, Elinor Millard, Ed Deering, Bert Sprotte, Conrad Seidemann, Paul Weigle, and Charles Giblyn. Millard was a stage actress, and this movie was her film debut. In addition to the unusual script development strategy used by Pathé, they also employed a U.S. Army Colonel, Frank S. Long, as a technical advisor on the film. A new type of silencer for the camera was employed on the picture, allowing a close-up of Boyd's hand signing a document to pick up the pen's scratching noise on the paper. The film included actual war footage from Pathé's film library, which at the time had one of the most extensive collections of World War I footage. While the film's main cinematography was done by Norbert Brodine, William Dietz was hired to do some special trick photography.

By July 11, 1930, production on the film was completed. By the end of the month, the picture was in the editing room. However, on July 23 it was announced that the film was being shelved for the time being, with portions to be re-shot. By August 21, the film was being advertised in major industry journals. In the released version of the film, scenes with Helen Twelvetrees and June Collyer were completely cut. In October it was announced that the film was scheduled for release on November 30, with the film undergoing some large re-shoots under the direction of E.H. Griffith. However, the film went back into the editing room in early December. The film's release date was eventually pushed back to be included in the 1931 release schedule. Pathé cut its planned 20 films for the 1930–31 schedule to 9, with Beyond Victory scheduled as the last of the nine. The reason cited was Pathé's acquisition by RKO Pictures. Beyond Victory was one of three Pathé films which were purchased outright by RKO.

== Reception ==
The reviews of the film were mixed. The Film Daily called it a "Fairly good war drama", highlighting the good performance of Marion Shilling. However, the magazine issued a retraction a short time later, noting that they meant to compliment the acting work of Lissi Arna, not Shilling. This sentiment was echoed by the Motion Picture Magazine, which called it a "War picture to talk about...." On the other hand, the Motion Picture Herald, described it as a "mixed-up affair, pacifist in theme, and in acting, story, direction and other departments woefully amateurish."

== Notes ==
Despite her scenes being cut, Helen Twelvetrees was part of a tie-in marketing campaign of the film and Outdoor Girl Face Powder. Richard Tucker, playing an American officer overseas in World War I was an actual officer in the American Expeditionary Force during the war. James Gleason was also an army veteran, having served during the Spanish–American War. Schilling's work on the film garnered her a long-term contract with Pathé. Bill Boyd was married to Dorothy Sebastian during the filming of the picture, with the couple delaying their honeymoon until the Spring of 1931.
