= Lydia (film) =

1941 American drama film directed by Julien Duvivier

- theatrical poster
- Directed by: Julien Duvivier
- Written by: Leslie Bush-Fekete; Julien Duvivier
- Screenplay by: Ben Hecht; Samuel Hoffenstein; André De Toth (uncredited)
- Based on: Story: Un Carnet de Bal
- Produced by: Alexander Korda
- Starring: Merle Oberon; Joseph Cotten; Hans Jaray; Alan Marshal; Edna May Oliver
- Cinematography: Lee Garmes
- Edited by: William Hornbeck
- Music by: Miklós Rózsa
- Production companies: Alexander Korda Films; London Films
- Distributed by: United Artists
- Release date: September 18, 1941
- Running time: 104 minutes
- Country: United States
- Language: English

Lydia is a 1941 American romantic drama film directed by Julien Duvivier and starring Merle Oberon as Lydia MacMillan, a woman whose life is seen from her spoiled, immature youth through bitter and resentful middle years, until at last she is old and accepting. The supporting cast features Joseph Cotten, Edna May Oliver and George Reeves. The picture is often referred to as a remake of Duvivier's Un carnet de bal (1937), which starred Marie Bell as the leading character, although the two films actually share few plot elements.

== Plot ==
At a reception honoring her work with blind and orphaned children, elderly Lydia Macmillan meets an old acquaintance, Dr. Michael Fitzpatrick, who has been in unrequited love with her for forty years. Accepting Michael's invitation to tea, Lydia discovers that he has also invited Bob Willard, a football quarterback she knew when a young woman, and pianist Frank Audrey, who once worked at Lydia's orphanage.

Lydia, a spinster, reminisces about her memories of each of the men, and one other, adventurous traveller Richard Mason. All had been in love with her at one time or another.

In Boston in 1897, a young Lydia prepares to go to a dance. Her guardian is her grandmother, a hypochondriac who chases away her doctor. She thinks that Lydia's dress is inappropriate for Boston society, even though she herself is the widow of a sea captain and came from a less than respectable background. The family butler intervenes when his son Michael arrives, having just graduated from medical school. Michael humors the old woman's complaints, and she agrees to let him escort Lydia to the ball.

En route to the ball, Lydia reveals that she is in love with football player Bob Willard. Michael and Lydia's sleigh is passed by another driven by a young man with a moustache. Lydia grabs the reins and races him. Later, Bob calls on Lydia at her house, having been coached by Michael about how to speak and act to please the grandmother. However, he gets carried away and appears to be drunk, and is ejected from the house.

Lydia later tells Michael that she plans to elope with Bob. Michael threatens to tell her grandmother, but eventually changes his mind, wanting to see Lydia happy. The planned marriage does not happen, however, because the magistrate who would perform the ceremony is unavailable. Nonetheless, the couple go to the hotel room Bob had reserved for their honeymoon. There, Bob gets drunk and attempts to assault Lydia. She flees and takes a cab away from the man who had raced her earlier. He agrees to help her.

In the present, the now-aged Bob tells Lydia that he has felt guilty about that night for the last forty years, but Lydia forgives him and continues her story. Seeing Michael off to a troop ship heading to Cuba during the Spanish-American War, she realizes that another soldier is the same man who raced her. His name turns out to be Captain Richard Mason. When the ship leaves, though, Lydia meets a young blind boy and escorts him to his impoverished home. She vows to use her money and time to help such children.

At the school she founds, Lydia meets blind pianist-composer Frank Audrey, who goes to work there and falls in love with her and even composes a piano concerto as a musical tribute. Lydia, however, turns him down, while Michael remains a friend and rejected suitor. At another ball, Richard Mason sweeps Lydia off her feet. The two steal away to her family's seaside home, and spend weeks there. Richard leaves Lydia behind when he goes to the mainland on a sailboat for supposed business. However, the boat returns with only the home's caretaker, who gives her a letter saying that Richard has to settle affairs with another woman who has "a claim" on him. Months later, in Boston, Lydia receives another letter from Richard, asking to meet him at a church on New Year's Eve, but he fails to appear.

Bitter and regretful, Lydia tells the three men about how she accepted Michael's marriage proposal, despite being unable to return his love. That match also never happens, however, when her grandmother dies just before the wedding. Lydia decides to devote the rest of her life exclusively to her school.

As Lydia finishes her story, one final guest arrives, the now aged Richard Mason. Lydia seems willing to forgive him, but Mason does not remember her at all.

== Cast ==
- Merle Oberon as Lydia MacMillan
- Joseph Cotten as Michael Fitzpatrick
- Hans Jaray as Frank Audrey
- Alan Marshal as Richard Mason
- Edna May Oliver as Sarah MacMillan
- George Reeves as Bob Willard
- John Halliday as Fitzpatrick
- Sara Allgood as Mary, Johnny's mother
- Billy Roy as Johnny
- Frank Conlan as Old Ned
- Harry Cording as detective (uncredited)
- Herbert Rawlinson as dignitary (uncredited)

== Production ==
The film was produced in the U.S. by London Films, the company controlled by producer Alexander Korda, who saw the film in part as a starring vehicle for his wife, Merle Oberon. Julien Duvivier was hired to direct the film (under the working title Illusions), adapted from Un Carnet de Bal and reset in America by Ben Hecht and Samuel Hoffenstein, with a budget of over one million dollars.

Before approving the film's release, the Production Code Administration (also known as the "Hays Office") demanded a different ending to the film so that Lydia would "pay" for her love tryst in a cabin. Despite his initial resistance, Korda gave in and shot several new endings to the film, claiming to like the one that was approved even better than the original.

The film's musical score by Miklós Rózsa includes piano miniatures and fragments of a concerto composed by one of Lydia's suitors. Rózsa later extended the latter piece into a full-scale work for two pianos and orchestra, the New England Concerto.

== Reception ==
Professor Tino Balio described the film as achieving only a moderate success at the box office. The Ultimate Movie Rankings database lists the box office returns as only one million dollars, hardly breaking even with the film's budget and ranking number 144 out of 221 films listed for 1941.

That same database lists the film as having received 65% favorable reviews, Variety in its review commented, "Dialog and narrative, with frequent use of cutbacks for the story telling, does not add to the speed of the unreeling under the leisurely direction by Duvivier,"" but praised Merle Oberon's performance and the makeup used to age the characters.

New York Times critic Bosley Crowther compared the film unfavorably to Duvivier's Un Carnet de Bal, remarking, "The fault, one can easily say, lies in the construction and writing of the film. The story is loosely conceived and then the dialogue is pitched on in thick gobs—high-flown, poetic speeches and chunks of solemn soliloquy."

== Awards ==
Composer Miklós Rózsa was nominated for the Academy Award for Best Original Score—Dramatic or Comedy Picture at the 14th Academy Awards.
