= Icebound (film) =

1924 film by William C. deMille

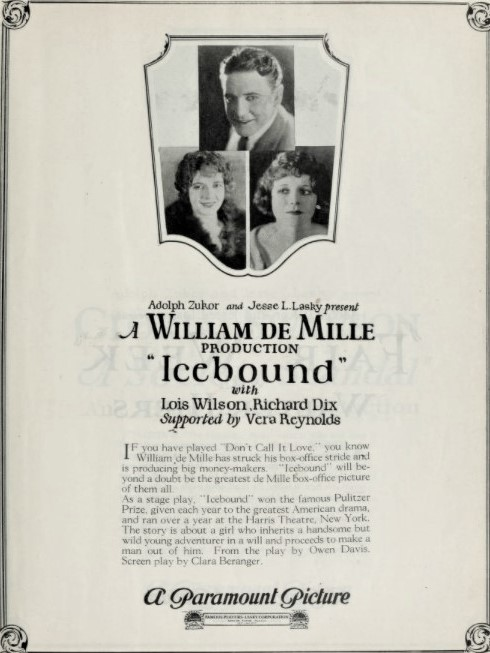
- Advertisement
- Directed by: William C. deMille
- Written by: Clara Beranger (scenario)
- Based on: Icebound by Owen Davis
- Produced by: Adolph Zukor; Jesse Lasky
- Starring: Richard Dix; Lois Wilson
- Cinematography: L. Guy Wilky
- Distributed by: Paramount Pictures
- Release date: March 2, 1924
- Running time: 7 reels
- Country: United States
- Language: Silent (English intertitles)

Icebound is a 1924 American silent drama film directed by William C. deMille, produced and distributed by Paramount Pictures, and based on a 1923 Pulitzer Prize Broadway produced play of the same name by Owen Davis. This film production was made at Paramount's Astoria Studios in New York City. Actress Edna May Oliver returned to the role that she played in the Broadway version.

== Plot ==
As described in a film magazine review, a disillusioned Ben Jordan returns home following service in France during World War I and colors the dull life of his New England town by indulging in various dissipations. He sets fire to a barn and disappears to avoid arrest. His stern old mother lies in bed in her sick room, attended by her physician, while greedy relatives assemble in the parlor, waiting for her demise. After her death, the relatives react with horrorstricken surprise when the family lawyer reads the will and self-sacrificing ward Jane Crosby is named as the sole heir. Jane sets out to reform Ben and falls in love with him. Although he is at first attracted to his vamp cousin, Nettie Moore, Ben finally realizes that he loves Jane, and all ends well.

== Cast ==
- Richard Dix as Ben Jordan
- Lois Wilson as Jane Crosby
- Helen Dubois as Emma Jordan
- Edna May Oliver as Hannah (same role she played on Broadway)
- Vera Reynolds as Nettie Moore
- Mary Foy as Sadie Fellowes
- Joseph Depew as Orin Fellowes
- Ethel Wales as Ella Jordan
- Alice Chapin as Mrs. Jordan
- John Daly Murphy as Henry Jordan
- Frank Shannon as Judge Bradford
- Kit Wain as French boy (uncredited)

== Preservation ==
With no prints of Icebound located in any film archives, it is considered a lost film.
