= Murder on the Blackboard =

1934 film by George Archainbaud

- Danish theatrical poster
- Directed by: George Archainbaud
- Screenplay by: Willis Goldbeck
- Based on: the Murder on the Blackboard; 1932 novel by Stuart Palmer
- Produced by: Pandro S. Berman (exec. producer)
- Starring: Edna May Oliver; James Gleason
- Cinematography: Nicholas Musuraca
- Edited by: Archie Marshek
- Music by: Max Steiner
- Distributed by: RKO Radio Pictures
- Release date: June 15, 1934 (US)
- Running time: 71 minutes
- Country: United States
- Language: English

Murder on the Blackboard is a 1934 American pre-Code mystery/comedy film starring Edna May Oliver as schoolteacher Hildegarde Withers and James Gleason as Police Inspector Oscar Piper. Together, they investigate a murder at Withers' school. It was based on the novel of the same name by Stuart Palmer. It features popular actor Bruce Cabot in one of his first post-King Kong roles, as well as Gertrude Michael, Regis Toomey, and Edgar Kennedy.

Murder on the Blackboard was the second of three films teaming Oliver and Gleason as Withers and Piper, following The Penguin Pool Murder and preceding Murder on a Honeymoon. Director George Archainbaud also directed the first film in the series.

== Plot ==
Miss Withers discovers the dead body of her colleague, music teacher Louise Halloran, in a schoolroom. She summons her old friend, Inspector Oscar Piper, but by the time he arrives, the corpse has disappeared. Having watched the only entrance (other than a fire exit with an alarm), Miss Withers knows the killer must still be inside. When the police search the building, Detective Donahue is knocked out in the basement. Meanwhile, Miss Withers notices various clues, including a tune on the blackboard in Halloran's classroom. The body is found being burned in the basement furnace. Then, the fire alarm goes off; the murderer has escaped.

Otto Schweitzer, the school's drunkard janitor, had some financial quarrel with Halloran. Piper arrests him, but Miss Withers does not believe he is the one they are after. She goes to the dead woman's apartment, which she had shared with her friend and school secretary, Jane Davis. There, she discovers that Halloran held one of the tickets for the Irish Sweepstakes. A newspaper account reports it is for the favorite in the race and is already worth $50,000. If the horse were to win, the amount would be $300,000. Davis claims she had a half share in the ticket, giving her a motive for murder. Fellow teacher Addison Stevens (Cabot) admits that Halloran was attracted to him. MacFarland, the womanizing head of the school, asks Withers to investigate the crime, but suspiciously suggests she leave town to check out Halloran's relatives. Snooping around, she finds a fragment of a burnt love letter from him to Halloran.

Later, during another search of the basement, the light is turned off and someone throws a hatchet at Miss Wither's head. After getting over her fright, she triumphantly points out to Piper that Schweitzer could not be the killer, as he is still in jail. Then, they see a newspaper report that he has escaped. It is discovered that the victim was already dying of "pernicious anemia of the bones". When Donahue comes to in the hospital, he cannot remember what happened, but Miss Withers has Piper tell the newspapers that Donahue knows the killer's identity. When the murderer sneaks in to Donahue's hospital room to poison his medicine, the trap is sprung. The criminal turns out to be Addison Stevens. (The tune on the blackboard spelled out the first few letters of his first name.)

Seeing no escape, Stevens drinks the poison himself, but reveals his motive before dying. Halloran and he were secretly married last summer. When his feelings changed, though, she would not give him up. He tried poisoning her slowly (causing the anemia), but she became suspicious, forcing him to act more decisively. Later, when Miss Withers calls to console Davis, she is disillusioned when Detective "Smiley" North answers the telephone and reveals he is having breakfast with the pretty woman.

== Cast ==
- James Gleason as Inspector Oscar Piper. Gleason played Piper in all six Hildegarde Withers films of the 1930s.
- Edna May Oliver as Miss Hildegarde Withers. Oliver had played Hildegarde Withers in The Penguin Pool Murder (1932) and would play the part again in Murder on a Honeymoon (1935).
- Bruce Cabot as Addison Stevens
- Gertrude Michael as Jane Davis
- Tully Marshall as MacFarland
- Frederick Vogeding as janitor Otto Schweitzer
- Edgar Kennedy as Detective Sgt. Donahue
- Regis Toomey as Detective Smiley North
- Jackie Searl as Leland Stanford Jones
- Barbara Fritchie as Miss Louise Halloran
- Gustav von Seyffertitz as Dr. Max Von Immen
- Jed Prouty as Dr. Levine
