= Craig Rice (writer) =

American novelist

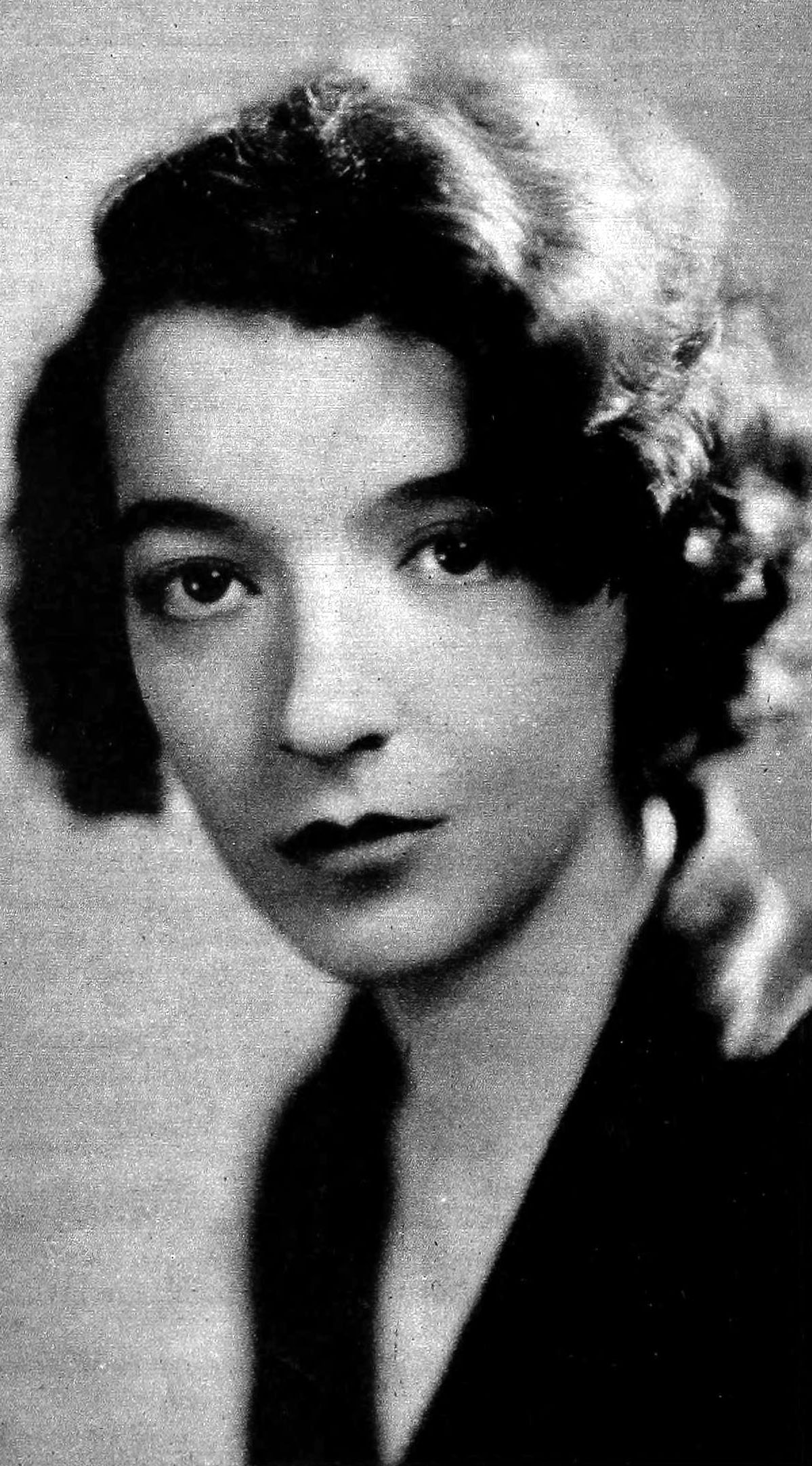
- Craig Rice, c. 1932
- Born: Georgiana Ann Randolph Walker Craig; June 5, 1908; Chicago, Illinois, U.S.
- Died: August 28, 1957 (aged 49); Los Angeles, California, U.S.
- Occupations: Author; writer; critic; screenwriter
- Spouses: Arthur John Follows; Albert Ferguson; Lawrence Lipton; H. W. DeMott Jr.
- Writing career
- Genre: crime fiction
- Notable works: Having Wonderful Crime, Home Sweet Homicide

Craig Rice (born Georgiana Ann Randolph Craig; June 5, 1908 – August 28, 1957) was an American writer of mystery novels and short stories, described by book critic Bill Ruehlmann as "the Dorothy Parker of detective fiction, she wrote the binge and lived the hangover."

== Early life ==
In 1908, Mary Randolph Craig reluctantly interrupted her globetrotting to return home to Chicago to give birth to her first child. Mary's husband, Harry Craig, was a Fort Atkinson, Wisconsin native. Soon after Georgiana's birth, Mary returned to her husband overseas, leaving Georgiana to travel from relative to relative. They returned in 1911 to meet their three-year-old daughter but then departed for Europe again, moving on to India when the war broke out. At that time, Georgiana found a permanent home in Fort Atkinson, Wisconsin, where she lived with her paternal aunt and uncle, Mr. and Mrs. Elton Rice, at 607 South Main Street. Elton Rice has been credited with stirring her interest in mysteries by reading her the poems and stories of Edgar Allan Poe.

== Writing career ==
Rice's first steps in publishing were as a writer for The Milwaukee Journal and The Chicago American. In 1930-31, she started working for radio stations, first WCLO and then the Beacon Syndicate in 1931. Her first fictional character, Professor Silvernail, was created for WCLO Syndicate Serials (1933). For a number of years she tried unsuccessfully to write novels, poetry and music, but it was not until her first story of John J. Malone, which she published under her birth surname and adopted surname Craig Rice, that she enjoyed some hard-won success.

Gritty but humorous, Rice's stories uniquely combine the hard-boiled detective tradition with no-holds-barred, screwball comedy. Most of her output features a memorable trio of protagonists: Jake Justus, a handsome but none-too-bright press agent with his heart in the right place; Helene Brand, a rich heiress and hard-drinking party animal par excellence (to become Mrs. Justus in the later novels); and John Joseph Malone, a hard-drinking small-time lawyer (though both his cryptic conversation and sartorial habits are more reminiscent of such official or private detectives). Against the odds and often apparently more by luck than skill, these three manage to solve crimes whose details are often burlesque and surreal, sometimes to the point of Grand Guignol, and all involving the perpetually exasperated Captain Daniel Von Flanagan of the homicide squad. A few stories feature the team of Bingo Riggs and Handsome Kusak, small-time grifters who become involved in criminal situations and have to dig themselves free by solving the mystery.

Rice also ghostwrote for George Sanders. Because of their friendship, many fans assumed that Rice ghostwrote the two wildly popular mysteries by Gypsy Rose Lee. "While the collaboration with Gypsy is often reported", J.F. Norris writes, "in the recently published and thoroughly well researched biography of Gypsy Rose Lee (Stripping Gypsy: The Life of Gypsy Rose Lee, Oxford University Press, 2009) [author Noralee Frankel makes it clear] that Craig Rice did not [emphasis in the original] write either of Lee's comic mystery novels. This is supported with correspondence between Lee and Rice. Rice did, however, help with the screenplay for The G String Murders, which became the Barbara Stanwyck vehicle Lady of Burlesque." Her association with Sanders came about as a result of her work on the screenplays of two of the Falcon movies, The Falcon's Brother (1942, Sanders's final outing as the Falcon) and The Falcon in Danger (1943, when Sanders's brother Tom Conway assumed the role).

She collaborated with fellow mystery writer Stuart Palmer on screenplays and short stories. Ed McBain completed her final novel for which she furnished the principal characters, Bingo Riggs and Handsome Kusak. (The "collaboration" with McBain is a "posthumous collaboration in which McBain completed an unfinished book begun by Rice. In a foreword to at least one edition of the book, McBain wrote that the book was essentially half-finished in first draft, but there were no notes as to how she had intended to continue it, so he had to solve the mystery himself before completing the manuscript.)

== Time magazine ==
On January 28, 1946, Rice appeared on the cover of Time magazine. The cover was created by Boris Artzybasheff.

== Personal life ==
She had three children: two daughters and a son. "Craig Rice kept very few personal records. She was conventionally wed four times with other affairs." One of her husbands was beat poet Lawrence Lipton.

In 1952, she was the plaintiff in a bizarre court case in which she sued a grocer for false imprisonment following a shoplifting accusation over a bar of soap, only to have the case dismissed when she disappeared for several months and could not be located by her own attorney, well-known entertainment lawyer Louis L. Goldman.

Like many of her characters, Rice herself was an alcoholic and made at least two suicide attempts. She also suffered from deteriorating health, including deafness in one ear and blindness in one eye with incipient glaucoma in the other. She died of a barbiturate and alcohol overdose, aged 49.

== Novels and short story collections ==
=== John J. Malone and Jake and Helene Justus ===
- Eight Faces at Three a.k.a. Death at Three (1939) "John J. Malone, rumpled Chicago lawyer, teams up with press agent Jake Justus and eccentric heiress Helene Brand, to discover who killed a vicious dowager and why the murderer then made up the beds in the victim's house and stopped the clocks at 3:00."
- The Corpse Steps Out (1940)
- The Wrong Murder (1940)
- The Right Murder (1941)
- Trial by Fury (1941). The Philadelphia Inquirer, July 25, 1943
- The Big Midget Murders (1942). The Philadelphia Inquirer, November 7, 1943
- Having Wonderful Crime (1943). The Philadelphia Inquirer, January 30, 1944
- The Lucky Stiff (1945)
- The Fourth Postman (1948)
- Knocked for a Loop (1957)
- My Kingdom for a Hearse (1957)
- The Name Is Malone (1958) Ten-story collection.
- The Pickled Poodles (1960) By Larry M. Harris, a continuation of the John J. Malone series.
- People Vs. Withers & Malone (1963) Six mystery novelettes, co-written with Stuart Palmer.
- But the Doctor Died (1967) A continuation of the John J. Malone series, but almost certainly ghostwritten.
- Murder, Mystery and Malone (2002) Twelve-story collection.

=== Bingo Riggs and Handsome Kusack ===
- The Sunday Pigeon Murders (1942) Philadelphia Inquirer, April 30, 1944.
- The Thursday Turkey Murders (1943) Bingo and Handsome take their cameras and head for Hollywood, only to break down in the small town of Thursday, Iowa. While stuck there, a convict escapes, there are murders and a disappearance, with clues leading back to a 15-year old bank robbery.
- The April Robin Murders (1958) Partially by Craig Rice, but completed and principally credited to Ed McBain.

=== Melville Fairr (under pseudonym Michael Venning) ===
- The Man Who Slept All Day (1942)
- Murder Through the Looking Glass (1943)
- Jethro Hammer (1944)

=== Non-series ===
- Telefair (1942; also published as Yesterday's Murder)
- To Catch a Thief (1943; published as by Daphne Sanders)
- Home Sweet Homicide (1944)
- Crime on My Hands (1944; ghostwritten for and published as by George Sanders)
- Innocent Bystander (1949)

Note

- The G-String Murders (1941, featuring and published as by Gypsy Rose Lee). This book was ghostwritten by Janet Flanner, who collaborated with Lee after she ended her initial discussions about such a project with Dorothy Wheelock. It has been suggested that Craig Rice ghostwrote this novel; this has since been debunked. The confusion may have arisen because Craig Rice was initially signed to write the script for G-String Murders, a feature film based on the novel that was eventually scripted by James Gunn and released as Lady of Burlesque with Barbara Stanwyck. At the time of the novel's original publication, the publishers "printed a private pamphlet, containing Gypsy's over frank correspondence about the book".

== Uncollected short stories ==
- Hero's Way. St Louis Post-Dispatch Daily Magazine, 10 October 1935
- Gallows Boy. St Louis Post-Dispatch Daily Magazine, 1 February 1936
- Even Chance. St Louis Post-Dispatch Daily Magazine, 22 February 1936
- Confession. Akron Beacon Journal, 27 May 1940
- Boy and Girl. Pittsburgh Press, 24 July 1940
- An Interview in the Street. Pittsburgh Press, 18 January 1941

== Film, radio and television adaptations ==
=== Films ===
- The Falcon's Brother (1942, original screenplay)
- The Falcon in Danger (1943, screenplay)
- Having Wonderful Crime (1945) Pat O'Brien as Michael J. Malone, George Murphy as Jake Justus, Carole Landis as Helene Justus, loosely based on the novel
- Home Sweet Homicide (1946) Peggy Ann Garner, Dean Stockwell and Connie Marshall as the mystery-solving kids; Lynn Bari as their mystery-writing mother, and Randolph Scott as the homicide detective whom they introduce as a romantic interest for their mother.
- Tenth Avenue Angel (1948) Margaret O'Brien and Angela Lansbury star in a "weeper" based on a radio sketch by Rice entitled Miracle at Midnight and a story by Angna Enters.
- The Lucky Stiff (1949) Brian Donlevy as John J. Malone, Dorothy Lamour as Anna Marie St. Claire, the nightclub singer, and Robert Armstrong as Inspector Von Flanagan, loosely based on the novel
- The Underworld Story (1950) Dan Duryea, Herbert Marshall, and Gale Storm in a film noir story from Rice's original story.
- Mrs. O'Malley and Mr. Malone (1950) based on a story by Rice and Stuart Palmer, Once Upon A Train, or The Loco Motive. Featuring James Whitmore as John J. Malone and Marjorie Main as Hattie O'Malley in a comedic story of murder on board a train to Chicago.
- The Eddie Cantor Story (1953) – treatment only.

=== Radio ===
The Amazing Mr. Malone (aka Murder and Mr. Malone) 30-minute episodes, 1948 (ABC), 1951 (NBC). John J. Malone was played principally by Gene Raymond and also by Frank Lovejoy and George Petrie.

=== Television ===
The Amazing Mr. Malone (1951–1952) had 13 30-minute episodes starring Lee Tracy as John J. Malone.

"Although The Amazing Mr. Malone ran for only one season on ABC from September 1951 to March 1952 it is fondly remembered by older viewers as the first crime series to feature a wise-cracking relationship between a Chicago lawyer and a police Captain ... which had originated in print, transferred successfully to the cinema, and then made it to TV—though not with the success it had enjoyed in the other two media. ... All in all, The Amazing Mr. Malone deserved a better fate than the one to which it was condemned by poor ratings."
