= ZaSu Pitts =

American actress (1894–1963)

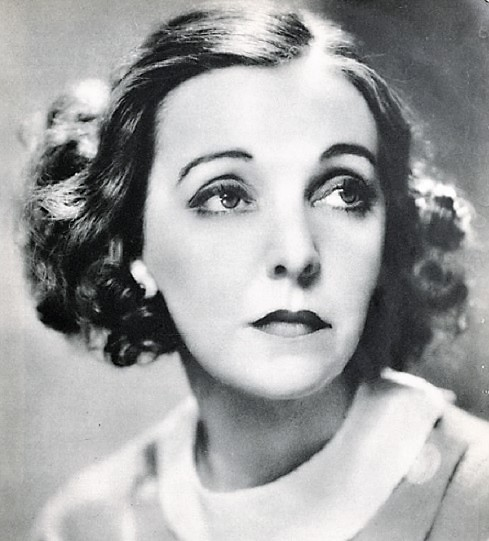
- Pitts in 1934
- Born: January 3, 1894; Parsons, Kansas, U.S.
- Died: June 7, 1963 (aged 69); Los Angeles, California, U.S.
- Resting place: Holy Cross Cemetery
- Occupation: Actress
- Years active: 1917–1963
- Spouses: Thomas Sarsfield Gallery (m. 1920; div. 1933); John E. Woodall (m. 1933)
- Children: 2

Signature
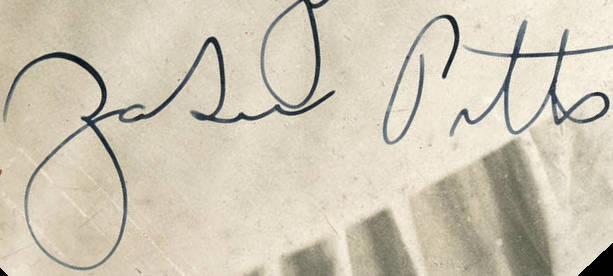

ZaSu Pitts (/ˈseɪzuː ˈpɪts/; January 3, 1894 (Note: Pitts's year of birth is difficult to pinpoint. Kansas did not keep birth records prior to 1911. Many sources, including Halliwell's Filmgoer's Companion, give 1898 as the year; her obituary in the New York Times gives 1900, which also appears on her headstone; Pitts biographer Stumpf gives 1894 and Notable American Women points out that the 1900 US Census gives her age as six years old.) – June 7, 1963) was an American actress, who in a career spanning nearly five decades, starred in many silent film dramas, such as Erich von Stroheim's 1924 epic Greed, along with comedies, before moving into sound films, mostly in comedy roles. She also appeared on numerous radio shows and later on television. She was awarded a star on the Hollywood Walk of Fame in 1960 at 6554 Hollywood Blvd. Her television work included the role of Elvira Nugent in the ABC sitcom The Gale Storm Show (1956), and her final film role was as the switchboard operator in It's a Mad, Mad, Mad, Mad World (1963).

== Early life ==
ZaSu Pitts was born in Parsons, Kansas, the third of four children of Rulandus and Nelly (née Shay) Pitts. Her father, who had lost a leg while serving in the 76th New York Infantry in the Civil War, had settled the family in Kansas before ZaSu's birth.

The names of her father's sisters, Eliza and Susan, were purportedly the basis for the name "ZaSu", i.e., to satisfy competing family interests. It has been (incorrectly) spelled as Zazu Pitts in some film credits and news articles. Although her name is commonly mispronounced /ˈzæzuː/ ZAZ-oo or /ˈzeɪsuː/ ZAY-soo, or /ˈzeɪzuː/ ZAY-zoo, in her 1963 book Candy Hits (pg. 15), published the year of her death, the actress gave the correct pronunciation as "Say Zoo" /ˈseɪzuː/, recounting that Mary Pickford had predicted "many will mispronounce it", and adding, "How right she was."

In 1903, when Pitts was nine years old, her family moved to Santa Cruz, California, to seek a warmer climate and better job opportunities. Her childhood home at 208 Lincoln Street still stands. She attended Santa Cruz High School, where she participated in school theatricals.

== Career ==
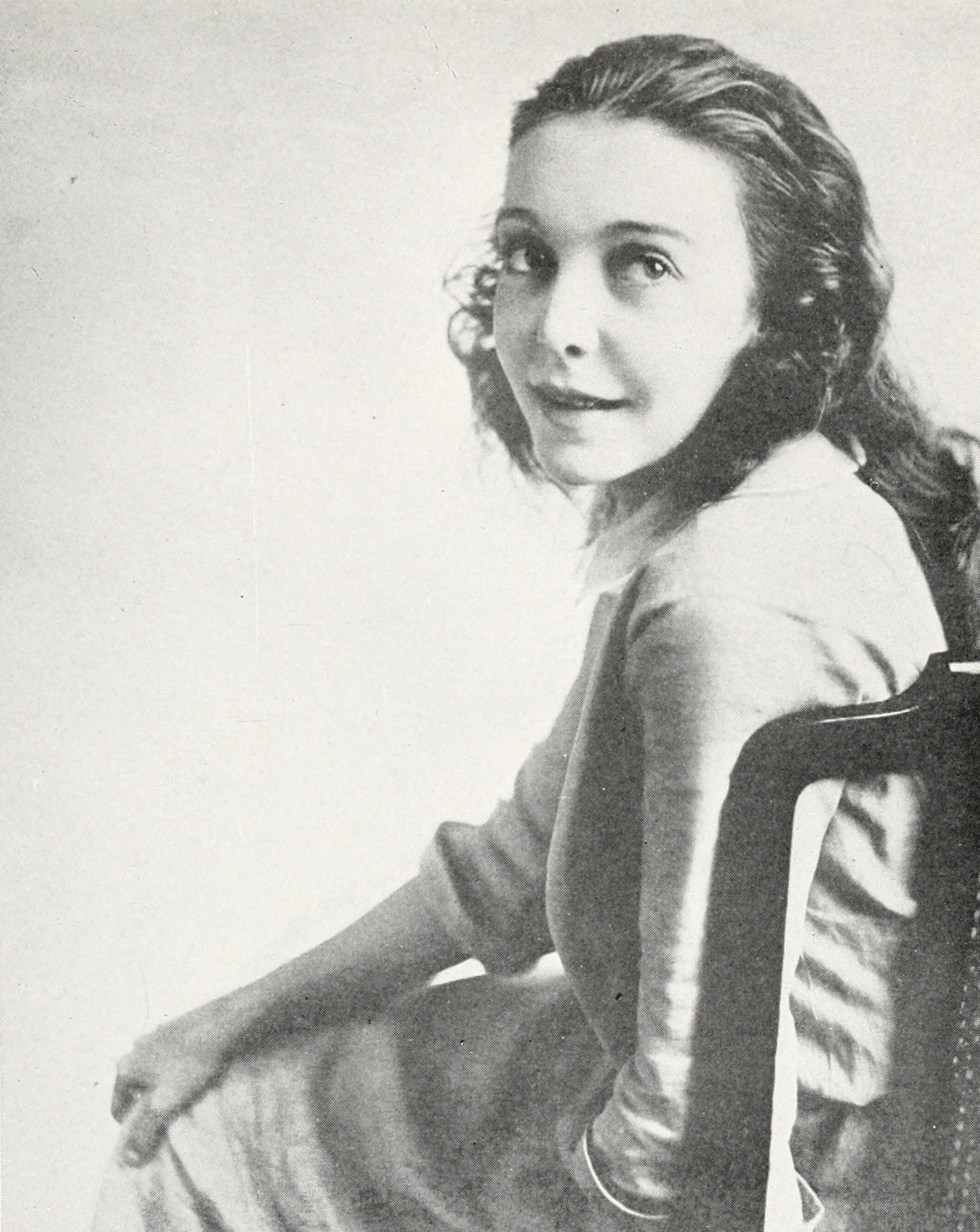
Pitts, circa 1920

Pitts made her stage debut in 1914–15 doing school and local community theater in Santa Cruz. Going to Los Angeles in 1916, at the age of 22, she spent many months seeking work as a film extra. Finally, she was discovered by screenwriter Frances Marion, who cast Pitts as an orphan slavey (servant who does menial housework) in the silent film A Little Princess (1917), starring Mary Pickford.

Pitts's popularity grew following a series of Universal one-reeler comedies, and earned her first feature-length lead in King Vidor's Better Times (1919). The following year she married her first husband, Tom Gallery, with whom she was paired in several films, including Heart of Twenty (1920), Bright Eyes, Patsy (both 1921) and A Daughter of Luxury (1922).

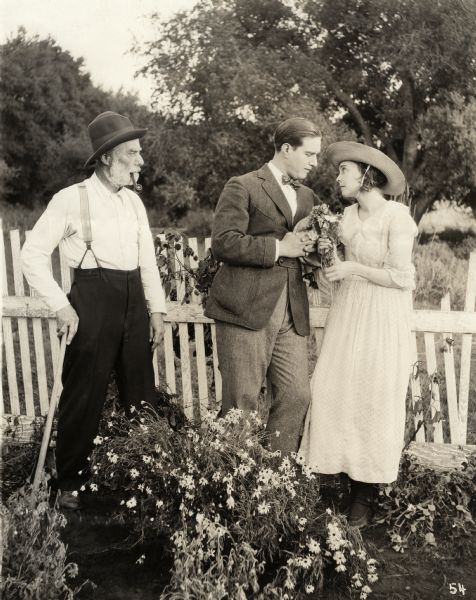
David Butler and Pitts look lovingly at each other while Jack McDonald glares in a scene still for the 1919 silent drama Better Times

Pitts enjoyed her greatest fame in the early 1930s, often starring in Hal Roach B movies and comedy short films, often cast with Thelma Todd as a pair of trouble-prone "working girls". (Note: Todd and she are listed by Variety as the top two actors in number of film roles in the early 1930s (pre-1933).) She played secondary parts in many films. Her stock persona—a fretful, flustered, worried spinster—made her instantly recognizable and was often imitated in cartoons and other films. At Universal she co-starred in a series of feature-length comedies with Slim Summerville. Switching between comedy short films and features, by the advent of sound, she became a specialist in comedy roles.

== Dramatic potential ==
Pitts played a tragic role in Erich von Stroheim's 7 1/2-hour epic Greed (1924). The surprise casting initially shocked Hollywood, but showed that Pitts could draw tears with her doleful demeanor, as well as laughs. Having been extensively edited prior to release—the final theatrical cut ran just over two hours—the movie failed initially at the box office, but has since been restored to over four hours and is considered one of the greatest films ever made. Based on her performance, von Stroheim labeled ZaSu Pitts "the greatest dramatic actress." He also featured her in his films The Honeymoon (1928), The Wedding March (1928), and Walking Down Broadway. Pitts's performance in Walking Down Broadway was dramatic, with her character showing a repressed romantic interest in her girlfriend; the studio reshot these scenes with Pitts, now playing the girlfriend's companion for laughs, and von Stroheim's directorial credit was removed from the film. The film was finally released in 1933, much changed, as Hello, Sister!.

ZaSu Pitts was so recognizable in comedies that the public did not take her dramatic efforts seriously. In the classic war drama All Quiet on the Western Front (1930), Pitts was cast as the distraught mother of a young soldier, played by Lew Ayres, but at preview screenings her intense performance drew unintentional laughs. Her scenes were refilmed with Beryl Mercer. In 1936 RKO needed a replacement actress for its Hildegarde Withers series of murder mysteries; Edna May Oliver had left the studio and Helen Broderick succeeded Oliver in the role. Pitts was chosen to succeed Broderick. In theory, it was a good idea: Pitts seemed to fit the role of a prim, spinster schoolmistress. However, mystery fans did not accept the fluttery Pitts as a brainy sleuth who matched wits with the police, and after her two Withers films the series was abandoned.

== Radio and stage ==
Beginning in the 1930s, Pitts found work in radio. She appeared several times in the earliest Fibber McGee and Molly shows, playing a dizzy dame constantly looking for a husband. When Marian Jordan temporarily withdrew from Fibber McGee and Molly due to illness, Pitts made guest appearances opposite Jim Jordan as Fibber. Pitts also guested on variety shows, trading banter with Bing Crosby, Al Jolson, W.C. Fields, and Rudy Vallee, among others. She played Miss Mamie Wayne in the soap opera Big Sister, and was heard as Miss Pitts on The New Lum and Abner Show.

In 1944, Pitts tackled Broadway, making her debut in the mystery Ramshackle Inn. The play, written expressly for her, did well, and she took the show on the road in later years. She was also a familiar attraction in summer stock theater, playing annually in the Norma Mitchell play Post Road.

== Postwar movies and television ==
Postwar films continued to give her the chance to play comic snoops and flighty relatives in such fare as Life with Father (1947), but in the 1950s, she started focusing on television. This culminated in her best-known series role, playing second banana to Gale Storm in ABC's The Gale Storm Show (1956) (also known as Oh, Susanna), in the role of Elvira Nugent ("Nugie"), the shipboard beautician. In 1961, Pitts was cast opposite Earle Hodgins in the episode "Lonesome's Gal" of the ABC sitcom Guestward, Ho!, set on a dude ranch in New Mexico. In 1962, she appeared in an episode of CBS's Perry Mason, "The Case of the Absent Artist". Her final role was as Gertie, the switchboard operator in the Stanley Kramer comedy epic It's a Mad, Mad, Mad, Mad World (1963).

== Personal life ==
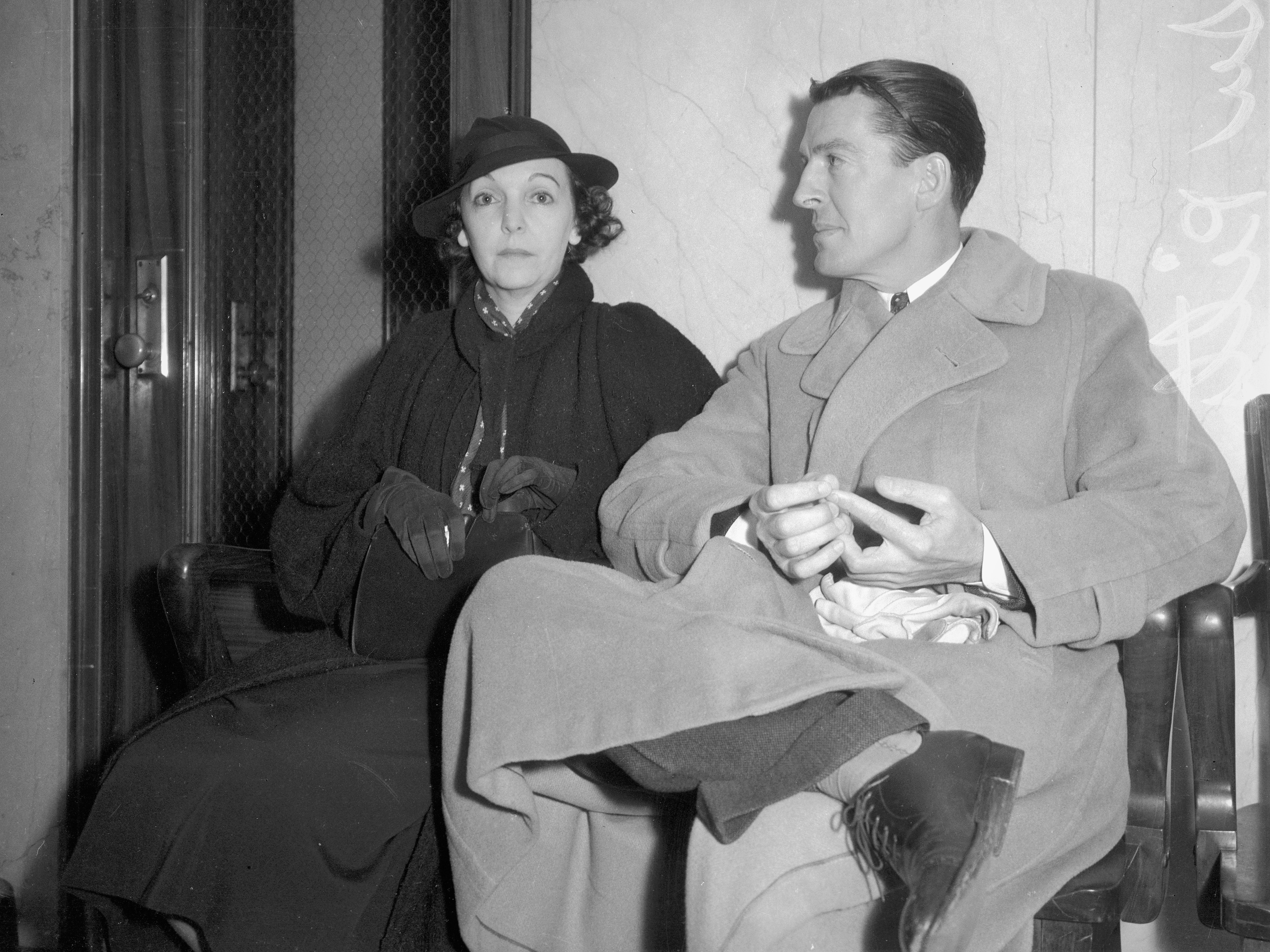
Pitts and husband John Woodall circa 1935

Pitts was married to actor Thomas Sarsfield Gallery from 1920 until their 1933 divorce. Gallery became a Los Angeles boxing promoter and later a TV executive. The couple had two children:

- ZaSu Ann Gallery
- Donald Michael "Sonny" Gallery (born Marvin Carville La Marr), whom they adopted and renamed after the 1926 death of Donald's biological mother (and Pitts's friend), actress Barbara La Marr.

In 1933, Pitts married John Edward "Eddie" Woodall, with whom she remained until her death.

Declining health dominated Pitts's later years, particularly after she was diagnosed with cancer in the mid-1950s. She continued to work, appearing on TV and making brief appearances in the films The Thrill of It All and It's a Mad, Mad, Mad, Mad World.

She died in Hollywood on June 7, 1963, aged 69, and was interred at Holy Cross Cemetery, Culver City. Pitts wrote a book of candy recipes, Candy Hits, which was published posthumously in 1963.

== Legacy ==
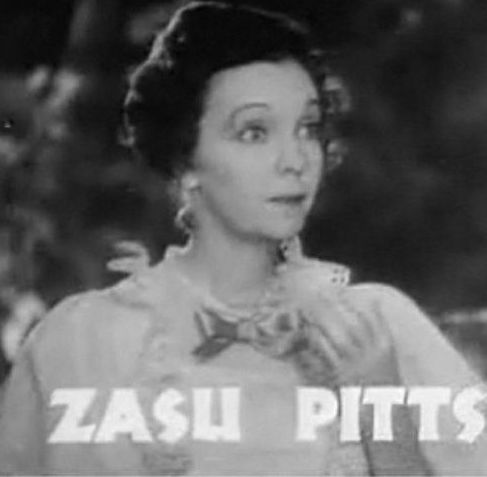
Trailer for Ruggles of Red Gap (1935)

ZaSu Pitts was inducted to the Hollywood Walk of Fame on February 8, 1960, for her contribution to motion pictures. Her star is on the south side of the 6500 block of Hollywood Boulevard.

In 1994, she was honored with her image on a United States postage stamp along with fellow actors Rudolph Valentino, Clara Bow and Charlie Chaplin as part of The Silent Screen Stars stamp set, designed by caricaturist Al Hirschfeld. Her birthplace of Parsons, Kansas, has a star tile at the entrance to the Parsons Theatre to commemorate her.

In the film Never Give a Sucker an Even Break (1941), W.C. Fields asks his niece, played by Gloria Jean, "Don't you want to go to school? You want to grow up and be dumb like ZaSu Pitts?" Gloria Jean replied, "She only acts like that in pictures. I like her."

Actress Mae Questel, who performed character voices in Max Fleischer's Popeye and Betty Boop cartoons, reportedly based the fluttering utterances of Olive Oyl on Pitts.

== Selected filmography ==
Silent
Year	Title	Role	Notes
1917	Rebecca of Sunnybrook Farm	Undetermined role	Uncredited
1917	'49–'17	Party Guest	Uncredited
1917	The Little Princess	Becky	
1918	A Modern Musketeer	A Kansas Belle	Uncredited
1918	How Could You, Jean?	Oscar's Sweetheart	Lost film
1918	The Talk of the Town		Lost film
1918	The Greatest Thing in Life		Lost film. Scenes deleted.
1919	A Lady's Name	Emily	Incomplete. Four of five reels survive at the Museum of Modern Art.
1919	As the Sun Went Down	Sal Sue	Lost film
1919	Men, Women, and Money	Katie Jones	Lost film
1919	Better Times	Nancy Scroggs	A copy is held at the EYE Film Institute Netherlands.
1919	The Other Half	Jennie Jones, The Jazz Kid	
1919	Poor Relations	Daisy Perkins	Lost film
1920	Bright Skies	Sally	
1920	Heart of Twenty	Katie Abbott	
1920	Seeing It Through	Betty Lawrence	
1921	Patsy	Patsy	
1922	Is Matrimony a Failure?	Mrs. Wilbur	Lost film
1922	For the Defense	Jennie Dunn	A copy is held at the EYE Film Institute Netherlands
1922	Youth to Youth	Emily	Lost film
1922	A Daughter of Luxury	Mary Cosgrove	Lost film
1923	Mary of the Movies	Herself (cameo)	An incomplete copy is held at the Ngā Taonga Sound & Vision.
1923	The Girl Who Came Back	Anastasia Muldoon	Lost film
1923	Souls for Sale	Herself (cameo)	
1923	Three Wise Fools	Mickey	A copy is held at the Cinematheque Royale de Belgique.
1923	Hollywood	Herself (cameo)	Lost film
1923	Poor Men's Wives	Apple Annie	Lost film
1923	Tea: With a Kick!	'Brainy' Jones	
1923	West of the Water Tower	Dessie Arnhalt	Lost film
1924	Daughters of Today	Lorena	
1924	The Goldfish	Amelia Pugsley	An incomplete copy is held at the Library of Congress.
1924	Triumph	A Factory Girl	Copies are held at the George Eastman Museum and the Library of Congress.
1924	Changing Husbands	Delia	A copy is held at the Library of Congress.
1924	The Legend of Hollywood	Mary Brown	
1924	Wine of Youth	Lucy	A copy is held at the George Eastman Museum. Scenes deleted.
1924	The Fast Set	Mona	Lost film
1924	Secrets of the Night	Celia Stebbins	
1924	Greed	Trina	The film is extant, but the original 42-reel version is lost.
1924	Sunlight of Paris		
1925	The Great Divide	Polly Jordan	A copy is held at the Cinemateket-Svenska Filminstitutet.
1925	The Re-Creation of Brian Kent	Judy	A copy is held at the Library of Congress.
1925	Old Shoes		
1925	Pretty Ladies	Maggie Keenan	The film is extant, but the Technicolor sequences are lost.
1925	A Woman's Faith	Blanche Odile	
1925	The Business of Love	Miss Wright	Lost film
1925	Thunder Mountain	Mandy Coulter	Lost film
1925	Lazybones	Ruth Fanning	
1925	Wages for Wives	Luella Logan	Lost film
1925	The Great Love	Nancy	Lost film
1926	Mannequin	Annie Pogani	
1926	What Happened to Jones	Hilda	
1926	Monte Carlo	Hope Durant	A copy is held in the Metro-Goldwyn-Mayer film library.
1926	Early to Wed	Mrs. Dugan	Lost film
1926	Sunny Side Up	Evelyn	
1926	Risky Business	Agnes Wheaton	
1926	Her Big Night	Gladys Smith	A copy is held at the UCLA Film and Television Archive.
1927	Casey at the Bat	Camille Gibson	A copy is held at the Library of Congress.
1928	Wife Savers	Germaine	Lost film
1928	13 Washington Square	Mathilde	Copies are held at the UCLA Film and Television Archive and the Library of Congress.
1928	Buck Privates	Hulda	A copy is held at the George Eastman Museum.
1928	The Wedding March	Cecelia Schweisser	
Sound
1928	Sins of the Fathers	Mother Spengler	Part-talkie
1929	The Dummy	Rose Gleason	
1929	The Squall	Lena	
1929	Twin Beds	Tillie	
1929	The Argyle Case	Mrs. Wyatt	Lost film. Only the sound for reels 3, 5, 7, and 9 survive, and possibly the soundtrack at the UCLA Film and Television Archive.
1929	Her Private Life	Timmins	
1929	Oh, Yeah!	The Elk	
1929	Paris	Harriet	Lost film. Only the soundtrack survives.
1929	The Locked Door	Telephone Girl	
1929	This Thing Called Love	Clara Bertrand	Lost film. Only the two-color Multicolor sequence survives.
1930	No, No, Nanette	Pauline Hastings	An incomplete copy is held at the BFI National Archive.
1930	Honey	Mayme	
1930	All Quiet on the Western Front	Frau Bäumer	Silent version trailer only; scenes deleted.
1930	The Devil's Holiday	Ethel	
1930	The Little Accident	Monica	
1930	The Squealer	Bella	
1930	Monte Carlo	Bertha	
1930	War Nurse	Cushie	
1930	The Lottery Bride	Hilda	
1930	River's End	Louise	
1930	Sin Takes a Holiday	Annie	
1930	The Honeymoon	Caecilia	Lost film. Released only in Europe.
1930	Free Love	Ada	
1930	Passion Flower	Mrs. Harney	
1931	Finn and Hattie	Mrs. Haddock	
1931	Bad Sister	Minnie	
1931	Beyond Victory	Mademoiselle Fritzi	
1931	Seed	Jennie	
1931	A Woman of Experience	Katie	
1931	Their Mad Moment	Miss Dibbs	
1931	The Big Gamble	Nora Dugan	
1931	Penrod and Sam	Mrs. Bassett	Alternative title: The Adventures of Penrod and Sam
1931	The Guardsman	Liesl, the Maid	
1931	The Secret Witness	Bella	
1931	On the Loose	Zasu	Short film
1932	The Unexpected Father	Polly Perkins	
1932	Broken Lullaby	Anna, Holderlin's Maid	
1932	Steady Company	Dot	
1932	Shopworn	Aunt Dot	
1932	Destry Rides Again	Temperance Worker	Alternative title: Justice Rides Again
1932	The Trial of Vivienne Ware	Gladys Fairweather	
1932	Strangers of the Evening	Sybil Smith	
1932	Westward Passage	Mrs. Truesdale	
1932	Is My Face Red?	Morning Gazette Telephone Operator	
1932	Make Me a Star	Mrs. Scudder	
1932	Roar of the Dragon	Gabby Woman	
1932	The Vanishing Frontier	Aunt Sylvia	
1932	Blondie of the Follies	Gertie	
1932	Back Street	Mrs. Dole	
1932	The Crooked Circle	Nora Rafferty	
1932	Once in a Lifetime	Miss Leyton	
1932	Madison Square Garden	Florrie	
1932	They Just Had to Get Married	Molly Hull	
1933	Out All Night	Bunny	
1933	Hello, Sister!	Millie	
1933	Professional Sweetheart	Elmerada de Leon	
1933	Her First Mate	Mary Horner	
1933	Love, Honor, and Oh Baby!	Connie Clark	
1933	Aggie Appleby, Maker of Men	Sybby 'Sib'	
1933	Meet the Baron	ZaSu	
1933	Mr. Skitch	Maddie Skitch	
1934	The Meanest Gal in Town	Tillie Prescott	
1934	Two Alone	Esthey Roberts	
1934	Three on a Honeymoon	Alice Mudge	
1934	Sing and Like It	Annie Snodgrass	
1934	Love Birds	Araminta Tootle	
1934	Private Scandal	Miss Coates	
1934	Dames	Matilda Ounce Hemingway	
1934	Their Big Moment	Tillie Whim	
1934	Mrs. Wiggs of the Cabbage Patch	Miss Hazy	
1934	The Gay Bride	Mirabelle	
1935	Ruggles of Red Gap	Prunella Judson	
1935	Spring Tonic	Maggie Conklin	
1935	Going Highbrow	Mrs. Cora Upshaw	
1935	She Gets Her Man	Esmeralda	
1935	Hot Tip	Belle McGill	
1935	The Affair of Susan	Susan Todd	Alternative title: Alone Together
1936	13 Hours by Air	Miss Harkins	
1936	Mad Holiday	Mrs. Kinney	
1936	The Plot Thickens	Hildegarde Withers	
1936	Sing Me a Love Song	Gwen Logan	
1937	Wanted!	Winnie Oatfield	
1937	Merry Comes to Town	Winnie Oatfield	
1937	Forty Naughty Girls	Hildegarde Withers	
1937	52nd Street	Letitia Rondell	
1939	The Lady's from Kentucky	Dulcey Lee	
1939	Naughty but Nice	Aunt Penelope Hardwick	
1939	Mickey the Kid	Lilly Handy	
1939	Nurse Edith Cavell	Mme. Moulin	
1939	Eternally Yours	Mrs. Cary Bingham	
1940	It All Came True	Miss Flint	
1940	No, No, Nanette	Pauline Hastings	
1941	Broadway Limited	Myra	
1941	Niagara Falls	Emmy Sawyer	
1941	Week-End for Three	Anna	
1941	Miss Polly	Miss Pandora Polly	
1941	The Mexican Spitfire's Baby	Miss Emily Pepper	
1941	Uncle Joe	Julia Jordan - the Widow	
1942	Mexican Spitfire at Sea	Miss Pepper	
1942	The Bashful Bachelor	Geraldine	
1942	So's Your Aunt Emma	Aunt Emma Bates	Alternative title: Meet the Mob
1942	Tish	Aggie Pilkington	
1943	Let's Face It!	Cornelia Figeson	
1946	Breakfast in Hollywood	Elvira Spriggens	
1947	Life with Father	Cousin Cora Cartwright	
1950	Francis	Nurse Valerie Humpert	
1952	Denver and Rio Grande	Jane Dwyer	
1954	Francis Joins the WACS	Lt. Valerie Humpert	
1957	This Could Be the Night	Mrs. Katie Shea - Landlady	
1961	Teenage Millionaire	Aunt Theodora	
1963	The Thrill of It All	Olivia	Released posthumously; filmed in 1962
1963	It's a Mad, Mad, Mad, Mad World	Gertie - Switchboard Operator	Released posthumously; filmed in 1962; final film role

== Television credits ==
Year	Title	Role	Notes
1949	Lum and Abner	Miss Pitts	Episode: "Pilot"
1954	The Best of Broadway	Miss Preen	Episode: "The Man Who Came to Dinner"
1954	The Spike Jones Show	self	Episode: "Charity Bazaar"
1955	Screen Directors Playhouse	Selma	Episode: "The Silent Partner"
1956	The 20th Century Fox Hour	Miss Appleton	Episode: "Mr. Belvedere"
1956–1960	The Gale Storm Show	Elvira Nugent	91 episodes
1957	Private Secretary	Aunt Martha	Episode: "Not Quite Paradise"
1960	The Dennis O'Keefe Show	Loretta Kimball	Episode: "Dimples"
1961	Guestward, Ho!		Episode: "Lonesome's Gal"
1962	Perry Mason	Daphne Whilom	Episode: "The Case of the Absent Artist"
1963	Burke's Law	Mrs. Bowie	Episode: "Who Killed Holly Howard?" Posthumous Air Date

== See also ==
- Pitts and Todd

== Sources ==
1. Donnelley, Paul (2003). Fade To Black: A Book Of Movie Obituaries. Omnibus. ISBN 978-1844494309.
2. Marston, Jack (2010). "Siren Song: The Tragedy of Barbara La Marr". In Tibbetts, John C; Welsh, James M (eds.). American Classic Screen Profiles. Scarecrow. ISBN 978-0810876767.
