= Edna May Oliver =

American actress (1883–1942)

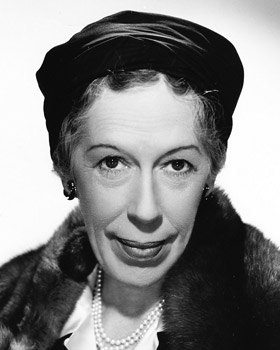
- Oliver in c. 1940
- Born: Edna May Nutter; November 9, 1883; Malden, Massachusetts, U.S.
- Died: November 9, 1942 (aged 59); Los Angeles, California, U.S.
- Resting place: Forest Lawn Memorial Park, Glendale, California
- Occupation: Actress
- Years active: 1897–1942
- Spouse: David Welford Pratt (m. 1928; div. 1931)

Edna May Oliver (née Nutter, November 9, 1883 – November 9, 1942) was an American stage and film actress. During the 1930s, she was one of the better-known character actresses in American films, often playing tart-tongued spinsters.

== Personal life ==
Edna May Oliver was born in Malden, Massachusetts, the daughter of Ida May and Charles Edward Nutter. Oliver quit school at age 14 upon the death of her father, and went to work to support her family by working as a milliner and a dressmaker. From an early age she also performed as a singer. She aspired to be an opera singer, but when that didn't work out she switched to an acting career. Reportedly, one of the places in Boston where she sang was the "Oliver Street Humanitarian" church, which purportedly was the source for her stage name which she adopted when she began pursuing a stage career. As a character actor she was self-deprecating about her looks, giving herself such nicknames as "Prune Puss" and "Pickle Pan".

== Career ==
She achieved her first success in 1917 on Broadway in Jerome Kern's musical comedy Oh, Boy!, playing the hero's comically dour Aunt Penelope. In 1923 she appeared as Hannah in the Broadway version of Owen Davis's Icebound. She would later reprise the Hannah role in William C. De Mille's silent film of Icebound the following year. In 1925, Oliver appeared on Broadway in Cradle Snatchers, costarring Mary Boland, Gene Raymond, and Humphrey Bogart. Oliver's most notable stage appearance was as Parthy, wife of Cap'n Andy Hawks, in the original 1927 stage production of the musical Show Boat. She reprised her role in the 1932 Broadway revival, but turned down the chance to play Parthy in the 1936 film version in order to play the Nurse in that year's film version of Romeo and Juliet. In 1942, after an absence of several years from the Broadway stage, Oliver was considering returning to do a new play written by Walter Drey titled My Aunt Alice, but ill-health later that year forced her to drop the idea.

Her film debut was in 1923 in Wife in Name Only. She continued to appear in films until Lydia in 1941. She first gained major notice in films for her appearances in several comedies starring the team of Wheeler & Woolsey, including Half Shot at Sunrise, her first film under her RKO Radio Pictures contract in 1930. Usually in featured parts, she starred in ten films, including Fanny Foley Herself (1931) and Ladies of the Jury (1932). She played wealthy, domineering Aunt March in the 1933 version of Little Women.

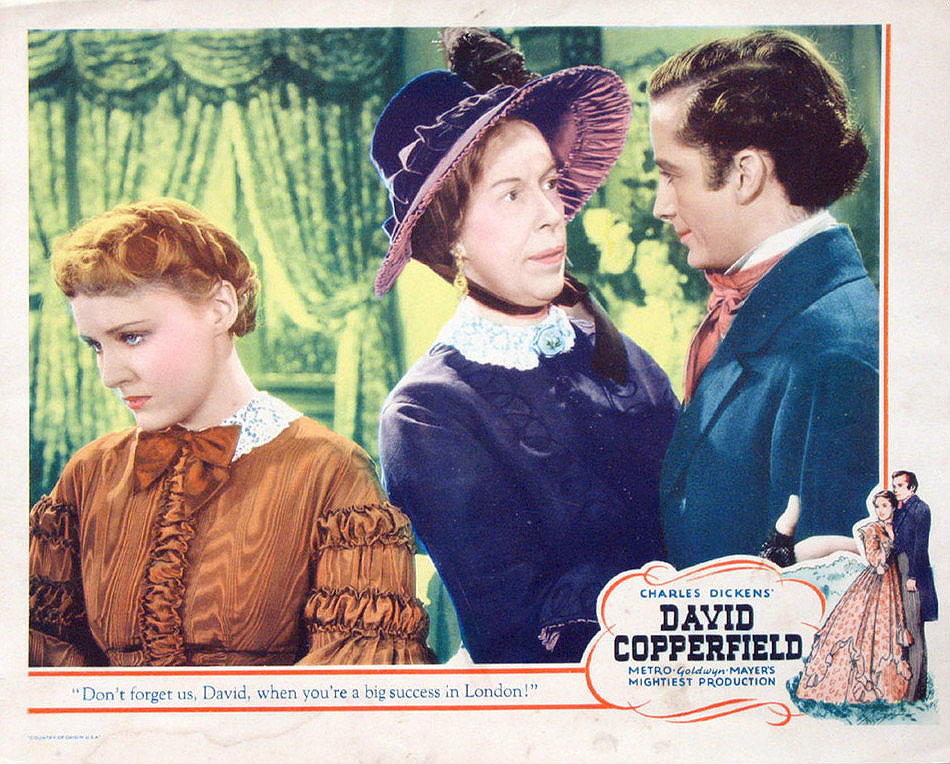
Oliver (center) in lobby card for David Copperfield (1935)

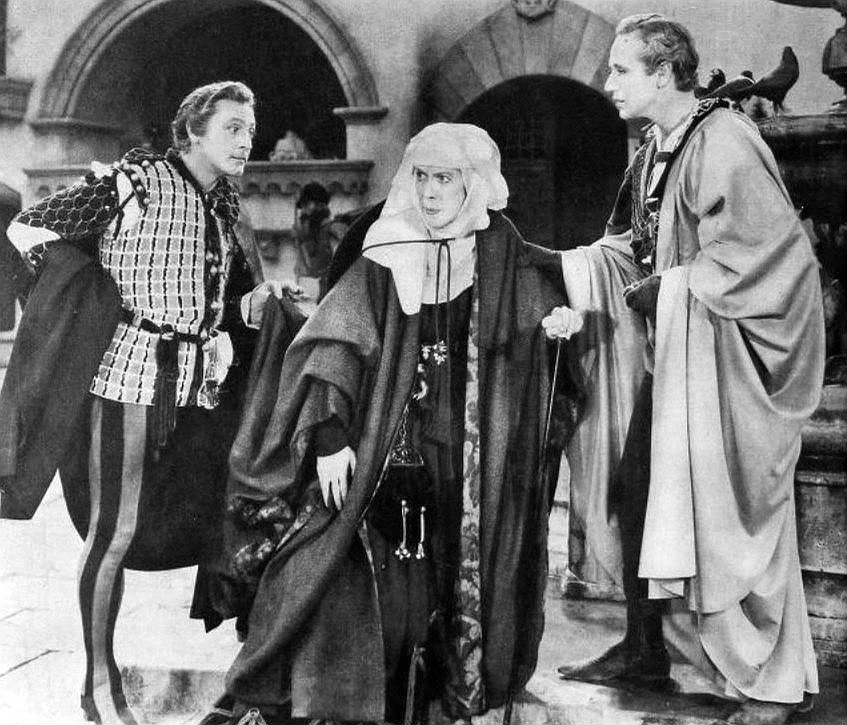
John Barrymore, Oliver and Leslie Howard in Romeo and Juliet (1936)

Oliver's most popular star vehicles were mystery-comedies, starring as spinster sleuth Hildegarde Withers from the popular Stuart Palmer novels. The series ended prematurely when she left RKO to sign with Metro-Goldwyn-Mayer in 1935; the studio attempted to continue the series with Helen Broderick and then ZaSu Pitts as Withers.

While at MGM, David O. Selznick cast Oliver in two film versions of novels by Charles Dickens, as the prim, acidic Miss Pross, in A Tale of Two Cities (1935), starring Ronald Colman, and as the title character's eccentric aunt, Betsy Trotwood, in David Copperfield (also 1935).

She appeared in the Shirley Temple film Little Miss Broadway (1938) as the landlord of a hotel for vaudevillians who wants to shut it down. She also performed in two 1939 movie musicals: with Tyrone Power in the Sonja Henie skating film Second Fiddle, and in a supporting role as the agent of the title characters in the Fred Astaire/Ginger Rogers musical The Story of Vernon and Irene Castle. A 1940 comic performance as Laurence Olivier's Mr. Darcy's domineering aunt Lady Catherine de Bourgh in Pride and Prejudice and a 1941 role as Merle Oberon's grandmother in Lydia concluded her film career.

She was also cast in noncomedic films such as Cimarron (1931), Ann Vickers (1933), and Romeo and Juliet (1936).

== Stage ==
(This list is limited to New York/Broadway theatrical productions.)

Broadway credits of Edna May Oliver
Date	Title	Role	Ref(s)
December 5, 1916 - January 1917	The Master		
February 20, 1917 – March 30, 1918	Oh Boy	Miss Penelope Budd	
November 25, 1919 – January 7, 1920	The Rose of China	Mrs. Hobson	
February 2, 1920 – May 1, 1920	My Golden Girl	Mrs. Judson Mitchell	
November 1, 1920 – December 11, 1920	The Half Moon	Mrs. Francis Adams Jarvis	
September 26, 1921 – unknown	Wait 'Til We're Married	Aunt Meridian	
November 28, 1921 – December 1921	Her Salary Man	Mrs. Sophie Perkins	
September 6, 1922 – September 1922	Wild Oats Lane	June	
February 10, 1923 – June 1923	Icebound	Hannah	
October 13, 1924 – November 15, 1924	In His Arms	Mrs. John Clarendon	
January 13, 1925 – February 1925	Isabel	Mrs. John Clarendon	
September 7, 1925 – October 1926	Cradle Snatchers	Ethel Drake	
December 27, 1927 – May 4, 1929	Show Boat	Parthy Ann Hawks	
May 19, 1932 – October 22, 1932	Show Boat	Parthy Ann Hawks	

== Filmography ==
Silent films
Year	Title	Role	Studio/distributor	Ref(s)
1923	Wife in Name Only	Mrs. Dornham	Pyramid Pictures	
1923	Three O'Clock in the Morning	Hetty	C. C. Burr Pictures	
1924	Restless Wives	Benson's Secretary	C. C. Burr Pictures	
1924	Icebound	Hannah	Famous Players–Lasky	
1924	Manhattan	Mrs. Trapes	Famous Players–Lasky	
1925	The Lucky Devil	Mrs. McDee	Famous Players–Lasky	
1925	Lovers in Quarantine	Amelia Pincent	Famous Players–Lasky	
1925	The Lady Who Lied		First National Pictures	
1926	The American Venus	Mrs. Niles	Famous Players–Lasky	
1926	Let's Get Married	J. W. Smith	Famous Players–Lasky	

Talkies
Year	Title	Role	Studio/Distributor	Ref(s)
1929	The Saturday Night Kid	Miss Streeter	Paramount Productions	
1930	Half Shot at Sunrise	Mrs. Marshall	RKO Pictures	
1931	Cimarron	Mrs. Tracy Wyatt	RKO Pictures	
1931	Forbidden Adventure	Bessie Tate	Paramount Productions	
1931	Fanny Foley Herself	Fanny Foley	RKO Pictures	
1931	Laugh and Get Rich	Sarah Austin	RKO Pictures	
1931	Cracked Nuts	Aunt Minnie Van Varden	RKO Pictures	
1932	The Penguin Pool Murder	Miss Hildegarde Martha Withers	RKO Pictures	
1932	Ladies of the Jury	Mrs. Livingston Baldwin Crane	RKO Pictures	
1932	The Conquerors	Matilda Blake	RKO Pictures	
1932	Hold 'Em Jail	Violet	RKO Pictures	
1933	Ann Vickers	Malvina Wormser	RKO Pictures	
1933	Meet the Baron	Dean Primrose	MGM	
1933	The Great Jasper	Madame Talma	RKO Pictures	
1933	It's Great to Be Alive	Dr. Prodwell	Fox Film Corp.	
1933	Only Yesterday	Leona	Universal Pictures	
1933	Little Women	Aunt March	RKO Pictures	
1933	Alice in Wonderland	The Red Queen	Paramount Productions	
1934	The Last Gentleman	Augusta Pritchard	20th Century Fox	
1934	The Poor Rich	Harriet Spottiswood	Universal Pictures	
1934	Murder on the Blackboard	Hildegarde Withers	RKO Pictures	
1934	We're Rich Again	Maude	RKO Pictures	
1935	David Copperfield	Aunt Betsey Trotwood	MGM	
1935	No More Ladies	Mrs. Fanny "Grandma" Townsend	MGM	
1935	Murder on a Honeymoon	Hildegarde Withers	RKO Pictures	
1935	A Tale of Two Cities	Miss Pross	MGM	
1937	My Dear Miss Aldrich	Mrs. Lou Atherton	MGM	
1937	Parnell	Aunt Ben Wood	MGM	
1937	Rosalie	Queen of Romanza	MGM	
1937	Romeo and Juliet	The Nurse	MGM; Note: Premiered August 20, 1936, but not released until April 16, 1937	
1938	Little Miss Broadway	Sarah Wendling	20th Century Fox	
1938	Paradise for Three	Mrs. Julia Kunkel	MGM	
1939	Nurse Edith Cavell	Countess de Mavon	Imperadio Pictures Ltd	
1939	Drums Along the Mohawk	Mrs. McKlennar	20th Century Fox	
1939	The Story of Vernon and Irene Castle	Maggie Sutton	RKO Pictures	
1939	Second Fiddle	Aunt Phoebe	20th Century Fox	
1940	Pride and Prejudice	Lady Catherine de Bourgh	MGM	
1941	Lydia	Sarah MacMillan	Alexander Korda Films	
1976	America at the Movies	Footage	American Film Institute	

== Radio ==
Oliver was a regular cast member from 1941 to 1942 on the Bob Burns radio series The Arkansas Traveler. She often played the character of an off-beat nurse, the type of role she had already performed earlier during her movie career.

On July 5, 1942 Oliver started a new summer radio series titled The Remarkable Miss Tuttle. She played the lead role of Josephine Tuttle, and the program had a planned 13-week run. However, Oliver quickly became ill and her role was taken over by her friend Mary Boland. When it became apparent that Oliver could not return, the title of the program was changed to The Remarkable Miss Crandall, with Boland playing the new lead character. This new format only lasted two weeks, and for the remaining four weeks the program was replaced by a new series, Mayor of the Town, starring Lionel Barrymore.

== Awards and honors ==
Oliver received an Oscar nomination for Best Supporting Actress for her performance in Drums Along the Mohawk (1939).

== Death ==
Oliver died at Cedars of Lebanon Hospital (today Cedars-Sinai Medical Center) on her 59th birthday in 1942 shortly after being diagnosed with abdominal cancer, and was interred in the Forest Lawn Memorial Park Cemetery in Glendale, California.

== Bibliography ==
- Monush, Barry (2003). Screen World Presents the Encyclopedia of Hollywood Film Actors: From the silent era to 1965. Hal Leonard Corporation. ISBN 978-1-55783-551-2.
- Palmer, Stuart (2013). Hildegarde Withers in The Riddle of the Blueblood Murders. Wildside Press LLC. ISBN 978-1-4344-4637-4.
