= Stuart Palmer (author) =

American mystery author and screenwriter

- Born: June 21, 1905; Baraboo, Wisconsin
- Died: February 4, 1968 (aged 62)
- Occupation: Author
- Writing career
- Pen name: Theodore Orchards, Jay Stewart
- Notable work: Hildegarde Withers mystery stories

Stuart Palmer (June 21, 1905 – February 4, 1968) was a mystery novelist and screenwriter. He was most famous for creating the character Hildegarde Withers. In addition, he used the pen names Theodore Orchards and Jay Stewart. for some of his works.

== Summary ==
Palmer was born in Baraboo, Wisconsin in 1905. He was reportedly descended from some of the earliest English colonists and held a variety of odd jobs before turning to fiction."

From 1928 to 1931, Palmer was a frequent contributor (sometimes using the pen name Theodore Orchards) to Ghost Stories magazine, writing short stories, essays, and a serialized novel, The Gargoyle's Throat.

Palmer tried his hand at writing a murder mystery with The Penguin Pool Murder, published in 1931 and filmed the following year by RKO Radio Pictures. Character actress Edna May Oliver starred as Palmer's heroine, Hildegarde Withers, a spinster schoolteacher who was an amateur sleuth—something of an American version of Agatha Christie's Miss Marple, although considerably more comic and caustic. He later admitted that he modeled Hildegarde after his former high school teacher, a Miss Fern Hakett. The casting of Oliver for the role was a coincidence, as Palmer had been influenced by her performance in the Broadway production of Show Boat when creating the character. The film was a hit and Oliver starred in two more Withers films, but she left RKO in 1935. Helen Broderick and ZaSu Pitts played Withers in another three films. A made-for-TV movie, A Very Missing Person, aired in 1972, starring Eve Arden as Withers. This first novel inspired Palmer to collect pictures and statues of penguins and create a personal trademark featuring one of these birds."

Palmer wrote fourteen Hildegarde Withers novels, including Murder on the Blackboard (1932), Murder on Wheels (1932), The Puzzle of the Pepper Tree (1934), Four Lost Ladies (1949), and Cold Poison (1954), set in the thinly disguised Walter Lantz animation studio. The short-story collection People vs. Withers and Malone (1963) was a collaboration with Craig Rice, in which Hildegarde Withers was teamed with Rice's hard-drinking lawyer detective J.J. Malone; one of the stories, "Once Upon A Train, or The Loco Motive," was the basis for the movie Mrs. O'Malley and Mr. Malone (1950). Hildegarde Withers Makes the Scene (1969) was completed by Fletcher Flora upon Palmer's death and published posthumously. Palmer also featured Withers in dozens of short stories that were published in newspapers and mystery magazines; many of these were collected in The Riddles of Hildegarde Withers (1947), The Monkey Murder (1950), and Hildegarde Withers: Uncollected Riddles (Crippen & Landru, 2002).

Outside the Hildegarde Withers series, Stuart wrote two novels about newspaperman-turned-PI Howard Rook, Unhappy Hooligan (1956) and Rook Takes Knight (1968). He also wrote a handful of science fiction and fantasy stories published in The Magazine of Fantasy and Science Fiction and Fantastic Universe.

Palmer also had a career as a Hollywood screenwriter. In 1936, he penned his first screenplay and would go on to write several others, most of them for B movies. He scripted the first three Bulldog Drummond films for Paramount and later entries in Columbia's Lone Wolf and RKO's The Falcon series. In 1954, Palmer appeared as a contestant on Groucho Marx's TV show You Bet Your Life.

"The Adventure of the Remarkable Worm" was a humorous Sherlock Holmes pastiche that was published in Ellery Queen's The Misadventures of Sherlock Holmes in 1944. In 1950 another pastiche, "The Adventure of the Marked Man", was published in Australian Women's Weekly; the pastiche takes the detective Sherlock Holmes and his companion Dr. Watson to the seaside town of Penzance in Cornwall, where they investigate the strange warnings given to Allen Pendarvis and a subsequent attempt on his life. "The two pastiches, one serious and one comic, were written while Palmer was marooned at an army post in Oklahoma, where he was serving as an instructor...."

Stuart Palmer also wrote "The Mystery of David Lang" for Fate Magazine. It wasn't until long after Palmer's death that the affidavits, testifying to the truth of the story and signed by David Lang's daughter and the local justice of the peace, were discovered to be in Palmer's own handwriting (including the signatures).

During WW2, Palmer was a Lieutenant in the 482nd Bombardment Group of the U.S. Army. Palmer served for one year as president of the Mystery Writers of America.

=== Bibliography ===
==== As Theodore Richards ====
- The Gargoyle's Throat (1930)

==== As Stuart Palmer ====
===== Hildegarde Withers series =====
- The Penguin Pool Murder (1931)
- Murder on Wheels (1932)
- Murder on the Blackboard (1932)
- The Puzzle of the Pepper Tree (1934), serialized, Los Angeles Times (1934)
- The Puzzle of the Silver Persian (1935), serialized, Los Angeles Times (1934)
- The Puzzle of the Red Stallion (1935) aka The Puzzle of the Briar Pipe (1936), serialized, Chicago Tribune (1935)
- The Puzzle of the Blue Banderilla (1937)
- The Puzzle of the Happy Hooligan (1941)
- The Riddles of Hildegarde Withers (1947)
- Miss Withers Regrets (1948)
- Four Lost Ladies (1949)
- Monkey Murder and other Hildegarde Withers Stories (1950)
- The Green Ace (1950) aka At One Fell Swoop (1951)
- Nipped in the Bud (1951) aka Trap for a Redhead
- Cold Poison (1954) aka Exit Laughing (1954)
- People Versus Withers and Malone (1963) with Craig Rice
- Hildegarde Withers Makes the Scene (1969) with Fletcher Flora
- Hildegarde Withers: Uncollected Riddles (2002)
  - ‘The Riddle of the Dangling Pearl’
  - ‘The Riddle of the Flea Circus’
  - ‘The Riddle of the Brass Band’
  - ’The Riddle of the Forty Naughty Girls’
  - ‘The Riddle of the Whirling Lights’
  - ’The Riddle of the Tired Bullet’
- The Adventures of the Marked Man and One Other (1973), limited edition booklet containing 'The Adventure of the Marked Man' and 'The I.O.U. of Hildegarde Withers', first published in The Baker Street Journal in 1948

===== Howie Rook series =====
- Unhappy Hooligan (1956) aka Death in Grease Paint (1956)
- Rook Takes Knight (1968)

===== Other works =====
- Ace of Jades (1930)
- No Flowers by Request (1937) aka Omit Flowers

==== As Jay Stewart ====
- Before It's Too Late (1950)
