= 1973 in film =

This page covers significant events of the year 1973 in film. Warner Bros. and Walt Disney Studios celebrated their 50th anniversaries.

== Highest-grossing films ==
=== United States and Canada ===
The top ten 1973 released films by box office gross in the United States and Canada are as follows:

Highest-grossing films of 1973
Rank	Title	Distributor	Domestic rentals
1	The Exorcist	Warner Bros.	$88,500,000
2	The Sting	Universal	$79,000,000
3	American Graffiti	Universal	$55,900,000
4	Papillon	Allied Artists	$22,500,000
5	The Way We Were	Columbia	$22,457,000
6	Magnum Force	Warner Bros.	$20,100,000
7	Last Tango in Paris	United Artists	$16,711,000
8	Paper Moon	Paramount	$16,559,000
9	Live and Let Die	United Artists	$15,925,000
10	Serpico	Paramount	$15,400,000

=== Outside North America ===
The highest-grossing 1973 films in countries outside of North America.

Country	Title	Studio	Gross	Ref
France	The Mad Adventures of Rabbi Jacob	SNC	7,295,727 admissions	
Germany	Papillon	Columbia Pictures	8,500,000 admissions	
Hong Kong	The House of 72 Tenants	Shaw Brothers Studio	HK$5,600,000	
India	Bobby	R. K. Films	₹110,000,000 (US$14,210,000)	(Note: ₹7.742 per US dollar in 1973)
Italy	Malicious	Paramount Pictures	11,756,327 admissions	
Soviet Union	The Headless Horseman	Lenfilm	64,900,000 admissions	
Spain	Cabaret	TBD	125.8 million ₧	
United Kingdom	Live and Let Die	Eon Productions	9,000,000 admissions	

== Worldwide gross revenue ==
The following table lists known worldwide gross revenue figures for several high-grossing films that originally released in 1973. Note that this list is incomplete and is therefore not representative of the highest-grossing films worldwide in 1973. This list also includes gross revenue from later re-releases.

Title	Worldwide gross	Country	Ref
The Exorcist	$441,306,145 (Note: Includes gross revenue from re-releases)	United States	
Enter the Dragon	$400,000,000	Worldwide	
The Sting	$257,000,000	United States	
Live and Let Die	$161,800,000	United Kingdom	
American Graffiti	$140,000,000	United States	
Bobby	$39,000,000	India	

The year's highest-grossing actor worldwide was Hong Kong martial arts film star Bruce Lee, who died the same year.

== Events ==
- March – Five Fingers of Death is released in the United States and is a surprise success starting a kung fu film craze in North America
- April 11 – Kim Jong-il publishes his film treatise On the Art of the Cinema.
- May 1 – The Marx Brothers' Zeppo Marx divorces his second wife, Barbara Blakely; she will marry actor/singer Frank Sinatra in 1976.
- July 20 – Martial arts legend Bruce Lee dies before Enter the Dragon is released on July 26.
- August 17 – The sci-fi movie Westworld is the first feature film to use digital image processing.
- December 25 – The Sting is released and goes on to become one of the top-grossing films of all time.
- December 26 – The Exorcist reawakens the horror film genre and becomes one of the most popular and controversial films ever released.

== Awards ==
Category/Organization	31st Golden Globe Awards January 26, 1974		27th BAFTA Awards March 6, 1974	46th Academy Awards April 2, 1974
Category/Organization	Drama	Musical or Comedy	27th BAFTA Awards March 6, 1974	46th Academy Awards April 2, 1974
Best Film	The Exorcist	American Graffiti	Day for Night	The Sting
Best Director	William Friedkin; The Exorcist		François Truffaut; Day for Night	George Roy Hill; The Sting
Best Actor	Al Pacino; Serpico	George Segal; A Touch of Class	Walter Matthau; Charley Varrick and Pete 'n' Tillie	Jack Lemmon; Save the Tiger
Best Actress	Marsha Mason; Cinderella Liberty	Glenda Jackson; A Touch of Class	Stephane Audran; The Discreet Charm of the Bourgeoisie and Just Before Nightfall	Glenda Jackson; A Touch of Class
Best Supporting Actor	John Houseman; The Paper Chase		Arthur Lowe; O Lucky Man!	John Houseman; The Paper Chase
Best Supporting Actress	Linda Blair; The Exorcist		Valentina Cortese; Day for Night	Tatum O'Neal; Paper Moon
Best Screenplay, Adapted	William Peter Blatty; The Exorcist		Luis Buñuel and Jean-Claude Carriere; The Discreet Charm of the Bourgeoisie	William Peter Blatty; The Exorcist
Best Screenplay, Original	William Peter Blatty; The Exorcist		Luis Buñuel and Jean-Claude Carriere; The Discreet Charm of the Bourgeoisie	David S. Ward; The Sting
Best Original Score	Neil Diamond; Jonathan Livingston Seagull		Alan Price; O Lucky Man!	Marvin Hamlisch; The Way We Were; Marvin Hamlisch; The Sting
Best Original Song	"The Way We Were"; The Way We Were		N/A	"The Way We Were"; The Way We Were
Best Foreign Language Film	The Pedestrian		N/A	Day for Night

Palme d'Or (Cannes Film Festival):

The Hireling, directed by Alan Bridges, United Kingdom
Scarecrow, directed by Jerry Schatzberg, United States

Golden Bear (Berlin Film Festival):

Ashani Sanket (Distant Thunder), directed by Satyajit Ray, India

== 1973 films ==
=== By country/region ===
- List of American films of 1973
- List of Argentine films of 1973
- List of Australian films of 1973
- List of Bangladeshi films of 1973
- List of British films of 1973
- List of Canadian films of 1973
- List of French films of 1973
- List of Hong Kong films of 1973
- List of Indian films of 1973
  - List of Hindi films of 1973
  - List of Kannada films of 1973
  - List of Malayalam films of 1973
  - List of Marathi films of 1973
  - List of Tamil films of 1973
  - List of Telugu films of 1973
- List of Japanese films of 1973
- List of Mexican films of 1973
- List of Pakistani films of 1973
- List of South Korean films of 1973
- List of Soviet films of 1973
- List of Spanish films of 1973

=== By genre/medium ===
- List of action films of 1973
- List of animated feature films of 1973
- List of avant-garde films of 1973
- List of comedy films of 1973
- List of drama films of 1973
- List of horror films of 1973
- List of science fiction films of 1973
- List of thriller films of 1973
- List of western films of 1973

== Births ==
- January 1 - Katie Carr, English actress
- January 4 - Damon Gupton, American actor
- January 7 – Baiba Broka, Latvian actress
- January 10 – Ryan Drummond, American actor and comedian
- January 14 – Katie Griffin, Canadian actress and singer.
- January 17 - Bob Persichetti, American animator, story artist, storyboard artist, screenwriter and director
- January 18 - Ben Willbond, English actor and screenwriter
- January 19 - Nash Edgerton, Australian director, stuntman and actor
- January 23 – Lanei Chapman, American actress
- January 24 – William Gregory Lee, American actor
- January 26 - Melvil Poupaud, French actor
- January 29 – Arben Bajraktaraj, Korovan-born French actor
- January 30 - Jordan Prentice, Canadian actor
- January 31
  - Portia de Rossi, Australian-Canadian actress
  - Matthew Faber, American actor (d. 2020)
- February 9
  - Colin Egglesfield, American actor
  - Shaun Parkes, English actor
- February 12 – Tara Strong, Canadian-American voice actress
- February 14
  - Kristen Dalton, American actress
  - Alec Sulkin, American screenwriter, producer and voice actor
- February 15 - Sarah Wynter, Australian actress
- February 17 – Lucy Davis, English actress
- February 18 – Tom Wisdom, English actor
- February 19 - Eric Lange, American character actor
- February 20 - Andrea Savage, American actress and comedian
- February 24 - Rob Morgan, American actor
- February 25 – Anson Mount, American actor
- February 27 – Li Bingbing, Chinese actress
- March 1 – Jack Davenport, English actor
- March 3 – Matthew Marsden, English-American actor, producer and singer
- March 4 – Len Wiseman, American director, screenwriter and producer
- March 8 - Boris Kodjoe, German actor and producer
- March 10 – Natasha Alam, Uzbekistani–American actress and model
- March 13 – Ólafur Darri Ólafsson, Icelandic-American actor, producer and screenwriter
- March 16 – Tim Kang, American actor
- March 18
  - Marcus Chait, American actor and producer
  - Luci Christian, American voice actress
- March 19 - Jill Culton, American animator, storyboard artist, director and screenwriter
- March 20
  - Jane March, English actress and model
  - Cedric Yarbrough, American actor and comedian
- March 21 - Vanessa Branch, English-born American actress
- March 22 - Clay Kaytis, American animator and director
- March 24 – Jim Parsons, American actor and producer
- April 1 - Kris Marshall, English actor
- April 2
  - Simon Farnaby, English actor, comedian and writer
  - Roselyn Sánchez, Puerto Rican singer-songwriter, actress, producer and writer
- April 3 – Adam Scott, American actor, comedian and producer
- April 6
  - Lori Heuring, American actress
  - Cindy Robinson, American voice actress
- April 10 – Guillaume Canet, French actor
- April 11
  - Kris Marshall, English actor
  - Alec Musser, American actor and fitness model (d. 2024)
- April 12 - Amr Waked, Egyptian actor
- April 14 – Adrien Brody, American actor
- April 19
  - Michael Bacall, American screenwriter and actor
  - David Soren, Canadian director, writer, voice actor and storyboard artist
- April 22 – Christopher Sabat, American voice actor
- April 26 - Erica McDermott, American actress
- April 28 - Elisabeth Röhm, American actress and director
- April 29 - Fares Fares, Swedish actor, producer and director
- April 30
  - Robyn Griggs, American actress (d. 2022)
  - Antonino Isordia, Mexican director
- May 5 – Tina Yothers, American actress
- May 8
  - Marcus Brigstocke, British comedian and actor
  - Jonathon Young, Canadian actor
- May 10 – Tora Sudiro, Indonesian actor
- May 12 - Mackenzie Astin, American actor
- May 17
  - Sasha Alexander, American actress and director
  - Matthew McGrory, American actor (d. 2005)
- May 21 - Noel Fielding, English comedian, writer, actor, artist, musician and television presenter
- May 25 - Jossara Jinaro, Brazilian-American actress (d. 2022)
- May 27 - Jack McBrayer, American actor, singer and comedian
- May 30 - Minae Noji, Japanese-American actress
- June 1 - Adam Garcia, Australian actor
- June 2 - Kevin Feige, American producer
- June 4 - Matt Corboy, American actor
- June 8 - Lexa Doig, Canadian actress
- June 9 - Orlando Wells, English actor and writer
- June 12 - Mel Rodriguez, American actor
- June 15
  - Neil Patrick Harris, American actor
  - Pia Miranda, Australian actress
- June 16 – Eddie Cibrian, American actor
- June 17 - Louis Leterrier, French director and producer
- June 18 - Julie Depardieu, French actress
- June 19 - Leticia Spiller, Brazilian actress
- June 21 – Juliette Lewis, American actress
- June 22 - Tracy Melchior, American actress
- June 24 - Alexander Beyer, German actor
- June 27 - Razaaq Adoti, British actor, producer and screenwriter
- June 29 - Lance Barber, American actor
- June 30 - Jon Gunn, American director and screenwriter
- July 2 - Peter Kay, English comedian and actor
- July 3 - Patrick Wilson, American actor, director and singer
- July 5 - Luca De Dominicis, Italian actor (d. 2024)
- July 6 - William Lee Scott, American actor
- July 8
  - Sebastian Maniscalco, American stand-up comedian and actor
  - Kathleen Robertson, Canadian actress
- July 9 - Enrique Murciano, American actor
- July 10 - Annie Mumolo, American actress, screenwriter, comedian and producer
- July 11 - Jason Liebrecht, American voice actor
- July 15
  - Brian Austin Green, American actor
  - Rachel Pickup, British actress
- July 16 - Robert Jayne, American actor
- July 19 - Saïd Taghmaoui, French-American actor and screenwriter
- July 20
  - Omar Epps, American actor, rapper and producer
  - Roberto Orci, Mexican-American screenwriter and producer (d. 2025)
- July 21 - Ali Landry, American actress
- July 22 - Jaime Camil, Mexican actor and singer
- July 23
  - Daisy Donovan, English television presenter, actress and writer
  - Kathryn Hahn, American actress and comedian
- July 24 - Jamie Denbo, American actress, writer and comedian
- July 25 - David Denman, American actor
- July 26
  - Kate Beckinsale, English actress
  - Gaetano Bruno, Italian actor
- July 29
  - Stephen Dorff, American actor
  - Dileep Rao, American actor
- July 31 - Daniel Evans, Welsh actor and director
- August 1 - Eduardo Noriega, Spanish actor
- August 2 - Simon Kinberg, British-born American filmmaker
- August 3 - Michael Ealy, American actor
- August 5 - Michael Hollick, American actor
- August 6
  - Asia Carrera, American pornographic actress
  - David Campbell, Australian singer, actor and television personality
  - Vera Farmiga, American actress
- August 8 – Jessica Calvello, American voice actress
- August 9 - Kevin McKidd, Scottish actor and television director
- August 14 - Jamie Sives, Scottish actor
- August 18 - Carmen Serano, American actress
- August 19 - Ahmed Best, American actor, comedian and musician
- August 22 – Kristen Wiig, American actress and comedian
- August 24
  - Dave Chappelle, American actor
  - Carmine Giovinazzo, American actor, writer and musician
  - Grey Griffin, American actress, comedian and singer-songwriter
  - Barrett Oliver, American child actor
- August 25 - Ben Falcone, American filmmaker, comedian and actor
- August 26
  - Andy Muschietti, Argentine filmmaker
  - Gunner Wright, American actor
- August 28 - Kirby Morrow, Canadian actor, comedian and writer (d. 2020)
- September 1 - Guillem Morales, Spanish director
- September 4
  - Jason David Frank, American actor and mixed martial artist (d. 2022)
  - Lazlow Jones, American writer, producer, director, voice actor and radio personality
- September 5
  - Paddy Considine, English actor, director, screenwriter and musician
  - Rose McGowan, American actress
- September 6 - Martin Hancock, English actor
- September 7
  - Shannon Elizabeth, American actress
  - Alex Kurtzman, American filmmaker
- September 12 –
  - Maximiliano Hernández, American actor
  - Paul Walker, American actor and producer (d. 2013)
- September 13
  - Travis Knight, American animator, producer and director
  - Jonathan Lloyd Walker, English actor, writer and producer
- September 14 – Andrew Lincoln, English actor
- September 18 – James Marsden, American actor
- September 19 - Nicholas Bishop, English-born Australian actor
- September 25
  - Bridget Marquardt, American actress
  - Bridgette Wilson, American actress and singer
- September 26 – Julienne Davis, American actress and model
- September 27 - Indira Varma, British actress and narrator
- October 1 – Christian Borle, American actor and singer
- October 2
  - Efren Ramirez, American actor
  - Verka Serduchka, Ukrainian comedian, actor and singer
- October 3
  - Keiko Agena, American actress
  - Sasha Alexander, American actress and television director
  - Neve Campbell, Canadian actress
  - Richard Ian Cox, Welsh-Canadian voice actor
  - Lena Headey, English actress
- October 6 – Ioan Gruffudd, Welsh actor
- October 8 - Jan Pavel Filipensky, Czech actor
- October 10
  - Mario Lopez, American actor and television host
  - S. S. Rajamouli, Indian director
- October 21 - Sasha Roiz, Israeli-born Canadian actor
- October 22 – Carmen Ejogo, British actress and singer
- October 23 - Stéphane Debac, French actor
- October 24
  - Burgess Jenkins, American actor
  - Kurt Kuenne, American filmmaker
- October 25 - Michael Weston, American actor
- October 26 – Seth MacFarlane, American actor, animator, screenwriter, comedian, director and singer
- October 28 – Kim Seo-hyung, South Korean actress
- October 29 - Pierre Png, Singaporean actor and comedian
- October 30
  - Adam Copeland, Canadian wrestler and actor
  - Kemp Powers, American filmmaker
- November 1
  - Robert Luketic, Australian director
  - Aishwarya Rai, Indian actress
- November 2 - Marisol Nichols, American actress
- November 3 - Sticky Fingaz, American rapper and actor
- November 4 - Steven Ogg, Canadian actor
- November 11 - Chris McKay, American filmmaker
- November 12 - Radha Mitchell, Australian actress
- November 13
  - Jordan Bridges, American actor
  - John DeSantis, Canadian actor
- November 14 - Dana Snyder, American actor and voice actor
- November 17
  - Leslie Bibb, American actress
  - Kerry Godliman, English actress and comedian
  - Maurizio Lombardi, Italian actor
- November 21 - Brook Kerr, American actress
- November 24
  - J. C. Chandor, American filmmaker
  - Lucy Liemann, British actress
  - Danielle Nicolet, American actress
- November 26 – Peter Facinelli, American actor
- November 27
  - Tadanobu Asano, Japanese actor
  - Sharlto Copley, South African actor
  - Samantha Harris, American actress and television presenter
- November 30 - Alex Macqueen, English actor and writer
- December 1 - Lombardo Boyar, American actor
- December 3
  - Bruno Campos, Brazilian-American actor and lawyer
  - Holly Marie Combs, American actress and producer
- December 4 - Tyra Banks, American television personality, producer, writer and actress
- December 5 - Shalom Harlow, Canadian actress
- December 10 - Janice Koh, Singaporean actress
- December 11 - Mos Def, American rapper, singer-songwriter and actor
- December 14
  - Thuy Trang, Vietnamese-American actress (d. 2001)
  - Jan Uuspõld, Estonian actor
- December 17 - Rian Johnson, American filmmaker
- December 27 - Wilson Cruz, American actor
- December 28 - Seth Meyers, American talk show host, actor and comedian
- December 30 - Christian McKay, English actor

== Deaths ==
Month
Date
Name
Age
Country
Profession
Notable films
January
2
Franciska Gaal
68
Hungary
Actress, Singer
- Paris Honeymoon
- The Buccaneer
15
Coleman Francis
53
US
Actor, Director
- Red Zone Cuba
- The Skydivers
19
Max Adrian
69
Northern Ireland
Actor
- Dr. Terror's House of Horrors
- The Terrornauts
24
J. Carrol Naish
77
US
Actor
- Sahara
- A Medal for Benny
26
Edward G. Robinson
79
Romania
Actor
- Double Indemnity
- Key Largo
29
Ludwig Stossel
89
Austria
Actor
- The Pride of the Yankees
- Casablanca
31
Jack MacGowran
54
Ireland
Actor
- The Exorcist
- The Fearless Vampire Killers
February
13
David Bauer
55
US
Actor
- Torture Garden
- Patton
15
Tim Holt
54
US
Actor
- The Treasure of the Sierra Madre
- The Magnificent Ambersons
15
Wally Cox
48
US
Actor
- Morituri
- The Bedford Incident
22
Katina Paxinou
72
Greece
Actress
- For Whom the Bell Tolls
- Rocco and His Brothers
24
Art Smith
73
US
Actor
- In a Lonely Place
- Body and Soul
28
Cecil Kellaway
82
South Africa
Actor
- Guess Who's Coming to Dinner
- The Postman Always Rings Twice
March
5
Rupert Crosse
45
US
Actor
- The Reivers
- Shadows
10
Robert Siodmak
72
Germany
Director
- The Killers
- The Spiral Staircase
11
Gregorio Fernandez
68
Philippines
Actor, Director
- Higit Sa Lahat
- Luksang Tagumpay
13
Melville Cooper
76
England
Actor
- The Petty Girl
- Rebecca
16
Carl Benton Reid
79
US
Actor
- The Little Foxes
- The Trap
19
Lauritz Melchior
82
US
Singer
- This Time for Keeps
- Two Sisters from Boston
22
Kane Richmond
66
US
Actor
- Brick Bradford
- The Shadow Returns
23
Ken Maynard
77
US
Actor
- Range Law
- Tombstone Canyon
26
Noël Coward
73
England
Actor, Songwriter
- Easy Virtue
- In Which We Serve
31
C. A. Lejeune
76
England
Critic

April
11
Ted de Corsia
69
US
Actor
- The Killing
- The Enforcer
12
Arthur Freed
78
US
Songwriter, Producer
- An American in Paris
- Gigi
14
Minna Gombell
80
US
Actress
- The Merry Widow
- The Thin Man
20
Robert Armstrong
82
US
Actor
- King Kong
- Double Jeopardy
21
Merian C. Cooper
79
US
Director, Producer, Screenwriter
- King Kong
- The Four Feathers
21
Ursula Jeans
73
UK
Actress
- The Woman in the Hall
- The Life and Death of Colonel Blimp
26
Irene Ryan
70
US
Actress
- San Diego, I Love You
- Heading for Heaven
May
4
Charles Grayson
69
US
Screenwriter
- The Woman on Pier 13
- Battle Hymn
6
Myrna Fahey
40
US
Actress
- House of Usher
- The Story on Page One
7
Maxine Doyle
58
US
Actress
- 6 Day Bike Rider
- Condemned to Live
10
Jack E. Leonard
63
US
Actor, Comedian
- Three Sailors and a Girl
- The Fat Spy
11
Lex Barker
54
US
Actor
- La Dolce Vita
- Tarzan and the Slave Girl
12
Frances Marion
84
US
Screenwriter
- The Big House
- Dinner at Eight
21
Vaughn Monroe
61
US
Singer, Actor
- Meet the People
- Singing Guns
29
P. Ramlee
44
Malaysia
Actor, Director
- Tiga Abdul
- Love Parade
June
5
Max Terhune
87
US
Actor
- The Purple Vigilantes
- Santa Fe Stampede
10
William Inge
60
US
Screenwriter, Playwright
- Splendor in the Grass
- Picnic
16
Louise Latimer
60
US
Actress
- Don't Turn 'Em Loose
- California Straight Ahead!
18
Roger Delgado
55
England
Actor
- The Terror of the Tongs
- Hot Enough for June
23
Fay Holden
79
England
Actress
- Love Finds Andy Hardy
- Samson and Delilah
25
Lars Tvinde
86
Norway
Actor
- An-Magritt
- By og land hand i hand
26
Ernest Truex
83
US
Actor
- The Adventures of Marco Polo
- His Girl Friday
July
2
Betty Grable
56
US
Actress
- How to Marry a Millionaire
- Million Dollar Legs
2
George Macready
73
US
Actor
- Gilda
- Paths of Glory
6
Joe E. Brown
80
US
Actor
- Some Like It Hot
- Alibi Ike
7
Veronica Lake
50
US
Actress
- Sullivan's Travels
- This Gun for Hire
11
Robert Ryan
63
US
Actor
- The Wild Bunch
- Bad Day at Black Rock
12
Lon Chaney Jr.
67
US
Actor
- The Wolf Man
- High Noon
18
Jack Hawkins
62
England
Actor
- Ben-Hur
- Lawrence of Arabia
20
Bruce Lee
32
US
Actor
- Enter the Dragon
- Way of the Dragon
30
Guy Middleton
65
England
Actor
- Oh! What a Lovely War
- Marry Me!
August
2
Jean-Pierre Melville
55
France
Director
- Le Samouraï
- Bob le flambeur
5
Warren Duff
69
US
Producer, Screenwriter
- Out of the Past
- Chicago Deadline
10
Douglas Kennedy
57
US
Actor
- Dark Passage
- The Amazing Transparent Man
11
Peggie Castle
45
US
Actress
- 99 River Street
- I, the Jury
16
Veda Ann Borg
58
US
Actress
- Mildred Pierce
- The Alamo
17
Eve Miller
50
US
Actress
- Kansas Pacific
- The Winning Team
22
Louise Huff
77
US
Actress
- Disraeli
- Great Expectations
30
Michael Dunn
38
US
Actor, Singer
- Ship of Fools
- You're a Big Boy Now
31
John Ford
79
US
Director
- Stagecoach
- The Grapes of Wrath
September
13
Betty Field
60
US
Actress
- Picnic
- Birdman of Alcatraz
20
Glenn Strange
74
US
Actor
- The Mad Monster
- Abbott and Costello Meet Frankenstein
21
Diana Sands
39
US
Actress
- A Raisin in the Sun
- The Landlord
24
Ted Adams
83
US
Actress
- The Lone Rider in Frontier Fury
- Across the Rio Grande
26
Anna Magnani
65
Italy
Actress
- Rome, Open City
- The Rose Tattoo
28
Norma Crane
44
US
Actress
- All in a Night's Work
- They Call Me Mister Tibbs!
28
Mantan Moreland
71
US
Actor, Comedian
- Mantan Messes Up
- Sky Dragon
October
6
Sidney Blackmer
78
US
Actor
- Rosemary's Baby
- High Society
6
Dennis Price
58
UK
Actor
- Kind Hearts and Coronets
- Ten Little Indians
16
Cleo Moore
48
US
Actress
- One Girl's Confession
- Over-Exposed
18
Crane Wilbur
86
US
Screenwriter, Director
- Solomon and Sheba
- House of Wax
27
Allan Lane
64
US
Actor
- Crime Ring
- Santa Fe Uprising
November
13
Lila Lee
72
US
Actress
- Blood and Sand
- Misbehaving Ladies
20
Viola Lawrence
78
US
Film Editor
- The Lady from Shanghai
- Pal Joey
23
Claire Dodd
64
US
Actress
- Roberta
- In the Navy
23
Robert Ellis
40
US
Actor
- Retreat, Hell!
- Gidget
23
Constance Talmadge
75
US
Actress
- The Duchess of Buffalo
- Dulcy
23
Sessue Hayakawa
84
Japan
Actor
- The Bridge on the River Kwai
- Swiss Family Robinson
23
Adele Buffington
73
US
Screenwriter
- Circus Girl
- Picture Brides
25
Laurence Harvey
45
Lithuania
Actor
- The Manchurian Candidate
- The Alamo
December
4
Michael O'Shea
67
US
Actor
- The Underworld Story
- Parole, Inc.
12
Ranald MacDougall
58
US
Screenwriter, Director
- Mildred Pierce
- Cleopatra
20
Bobby Darin
37
US
Actor, Singer
- Captain Newman, M.D.
- If a Man Answers
26
Steven Geray
69
Ukraine
Actor
- Gilda
- Call Me Madam
26
William Haines
73
US
Actor
- Show People
- West Point
31
A. Edward Sutherland
78
England
Director
- The Flying Deuces
- Dixie

== Film debuts ==
- Danny Aiello – Bang the Drum Slowly
- Nancy Allen – The Last Detail
- John Ashton – The Psychopath
- Daniel Auteuil – The Year 01
- Graham Beckel – The Paper Chase
- Christine Boisson – The Mad Adventures of Rabbi Jacob
- Reb Brown – Sssssss
- Dennis Burkley – Bummer!
- Colleen Camp – Battle for the Planet of the Apes
- John Candy – Class of '44
- David Clennon – The Paper Chase
- Gérard Darmon – The Mad Adventures of Rabbi Jacob
- Laura Dern – White Lightning
- Pino Donnagio – Don't Look Now (film composer)
- George Dzundza – Massage Parlor Murders
- Anthony Edwards – Big Zapper
- Michael Ensign – Assassin
- Emilio Estevez – Badlands
- Dexter Fletcher – Steptoe and Son Ride Again
- Sasson Gabai – Light Out of Nowhere
- Victor Garber – Godspell
- Burton Gilliam – Paper Moon
- John Glover – Shamus
- Irma P. Hall – Book of Numbers
- Rutger Hauer – Turkish Delight
- William Hootkins – Big Zapper
- Celia Imrie – Assassin
- Gérard Jugnot – The Year 01
- Dimple Kapadia – Bobby
- Sylvia Kristel – Frank en Eva
- Stan Lee – The Year 01
- Kay Lenz – American Graffiti
- Thierry Lhermitte – The Year 01
- Frank Marshall (producer) – Paper Moon
- Orestes Matacena – Badge 373
- Kris McQuade – Alvin Purple
- Robert Miano – Badge 373
- Temuera Morrison – Rangi's Catch
- Ian Mune – Rangi's Catch
- Bernadette Peters – Ace Eli and Rodger of the Skies
- Joe Pantoliano – Road Movie
- John Rhys-Davies – Penny Gold
- Allan Rich – Serpico
- Henry G. Sanders – No Place to Hide
- Charlie Sheen – Badlands
- Bo Svenson – Maurie
- Ana Torrent – The Spirit of the Beehive
- Monique van de Ven – Turkish Delight
- Clement von Franckenstein – The Slams
- Carl Weathers – Magnum Force
- Marc Zuber – Penny Gold
