= Frank Marlowe =

American character actor (1904–1964)

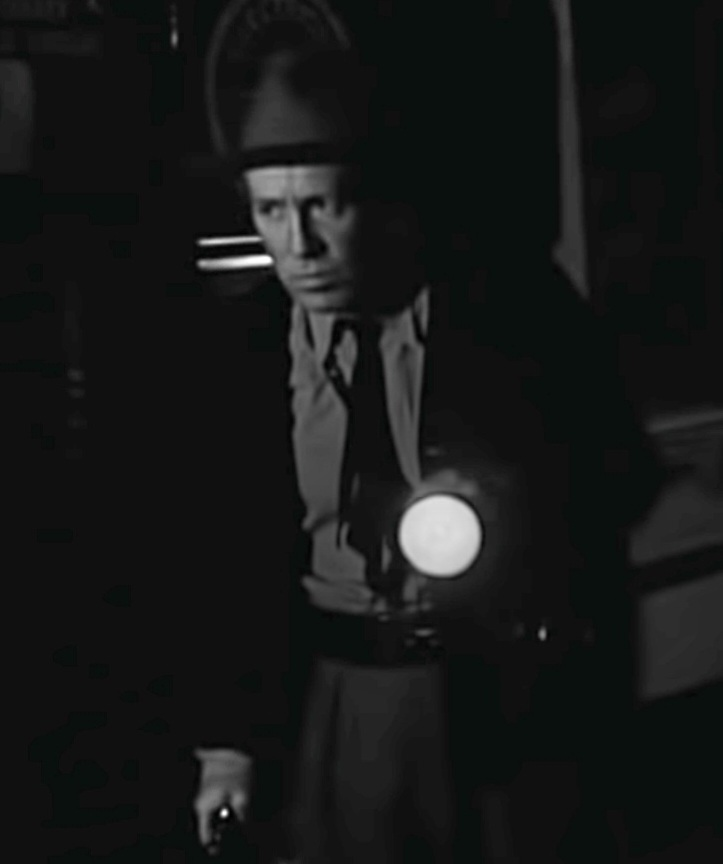
- Marlowe in Quicksand (1950)
- Born: Frank Marlowe Riggi; January 20, 1904; Massachusetts, U.S.
- Died: March 30, 1964 (aged 60); Hollywood, California, U.S.
- Other names: Frank Riggi; Frank Marlo
- Occupation: Actor
- Years active: 1931–1961

Frank Marlowe (born Frank Marlowe Riggi; January 20, 1904 – March 30, 1964), also known as Frank Riggi and Frank Marlo, was an American character actor from the 1930s until the 1960s. During Marlowe's 30-year career he would appear in over 200 feature films, as well as dozens of television shows.

== Early life ==
Born on January 20, 1904, in Massachusetts, he entered the film industry in the early 1930s; while some sources have him in films as early as 1931, the American Film Institute has his earliest film appearance in Howard Hawk's 1934 film, Twentieth Century, starring John Barrymore and Carole Lombard.

== Career ==
Marlowe's prolific film career involved small roles in many notable films. Some of those films include: the 1935 John Ford comedy, The Whole Town's Talking, starring Edward G. Robinson and Jean Arthur; Howard Hawk's classic romantic comedy, Bringing Up Baby (1938), starring Cary Grant and Katharine Hepburn; 1940's My Favorite Wife, ageing starring Grant, this time with Irene Dunne; the two classic biopics One Foot in Heaven (1941), starring Fredric March and Martha Scott, and Sergeant York (1941) starring Gary Cooper; Alfred Hitchcock's 1942 thriller, Saboteur, with Robert Cummings and Priscilla Lane; the 1945 musical Anchors Aweigh, starring Frank Sinatra, Gene Kelly, and Kathryn Grayson; 1942's Bob Hope and Bing Crosby buddy film, Road to Utopia; the 1942 Danny Kaye vehicle, The Kid from Brooklyn, which also stars Virginia Mayo; Michael Curtiz's classic biopic of Cole Porter, Night and Day (1946), starring Cary Grant and Alexis Smith; Hitchcock's 1946 thriller, Notorious, with Cary Grant, Ingrid Bergman, and Claude Rains; The Secret Life of Walter Mitty (1947), again starring Kaye and Mayo; and the 1948 classic swashbuckler, The Three Musketeers, starring Gene Kelly, Lana Turner and an all-star cast.

The 1950s would see Marlowe continue his numerous film appearances, while he would also branch out into the new medium of television. Notable films in which he appeared include Joan of Arc (1948), starring Ingrid Bergman; 1951's Flying Leathernecks, starring John Wayne and Robert Ryan; Trouble Along the Way (1953), another Wayne film, this time also starring Donna Reed and Charles Coburn; the classic 1954 version of A Star Is Born, with James Mason and Judy Garland; Otto Preminger's classic drama The Man with the Golden Arm (1955), starring Sinatra, Eleanor Parker, and Kim Novak; Joanne Woodward's tour de force in The Three Faces of Eve (1957). Although the Internet Movie Database has him appearing in two films in 1961, AFI has his final film appearance as one of the taxi drivers in Hitchcock's classic thriller North by Northwest in 1959, starring Cary Grant, Eva Marie Saint and James Mason. Interspersed with his film performances, Marlowe would make dozens of television appearances. His TV work included guest roles on: The Abbott and Costello Show, Adventures of Superman, The Millionaire, Dragnet, Perry Mason, and Alfred Hitchcock Presents.

== Death ==
Marlowe died on March 30, 1964, at the age of 60 in Hollywood, California.

== Selected filmography ==
- The Finger Points (1931) – Guard in Office of 'Number One' (uncredited)
- Dude Ranch (1931) – Gangster (uncredited)
- Hell's Highway (1932) – Convict (uncredited)
- The Half-Naked Truth (1932) – Stagehand (uncredited)
- Today We Live (1933) – Military Police Corporal (uncredited)
- Hell Below (1933) – Seaman (uncredited)
- Hi, Nellie! (1934) – Henchman (uncredited)
- Twentieth Century (1934) – Mulligan (uncredited)
- Now I'll Tell (1934) – George Curtis
- Operator 13 (1934) – Confederate Officer (uncredited)
- Here Comes the Navy (1934) – USS Arizona Sailor (uncredited)
- The Girl from Missouri (1934) – Reporter in Stateroom (uncredited)
- Hide-Out (1934) – Laundry Driver (uncredited)
- 6 Day Bike Rider (1934) – Tough Messenger (uncredited)
- Men of the Night (1934) – Gas Station Attendant (uncredited)
- The Whole Town's Talking (1935) – Ship Steward (uncredited)
- I'll Love You Always (1935) – Bellhop (uncredited)
- G Men (1935) – First Gangster Shot at Lodge (uncredited)
- Men of the Hour (1935) – Cab Driver (uncredited)
- The Informer (1935) – Admirer (uncredited)
- The Glass Key (1935) – Walter Ivans (uncredited)
- Stranded (1935) – Rollins, an Agitator (uncredited)
- Ladies Crave Excitement (1935) – Scott – Photographer (uncredited)
- We're in the Money (1935) – Sailor (uncredited)
- Hot Tip (1935) – Racetrack Gambler (uncredited)
- Atlantic Adventure (1935) – Reporter (uncredited)
- Here Comes the Band (1935) – Sim (scenes deleted)
- She Couldn't Take It (1935) – Prisoner (uncredited)
- It's in the Air (1935) – Reporter (uncredited)
- Shipmates Forever (1935) – Seaman (uncredited)
- Confidential (1935) – G-Man (uncredited)
- Whipsaw (1935) – Second Bellboy (uncredited)
- Love on a Bet (1936) – Cider Drinker (uncredited)
- Murder on a Bridle Path (1936) – Horseman on Bridle Path (uncredited)
- Special Investigator (1936) – Reporter (uncredited)
- Bullets or Ballots (1936) – Kruger's Chauffeur (uncredited)
- Grand Jury (1936) – Reporter (uncredited)
- My American Wife (1936) – Reporter (uncredited)
- Two-Fisted Gentleman (1936) – Man in Gym
- Sworn Enemy (1936) – Busy Taxi Driver (uncredited)
- Murder with Pictures (1936) – Pipe Smoker (uncredited)
- The Gay Desperado (1936) – On-Screen Gangster (uncredited)
- Without Orders (1936) – Pilot at Airport (uncredited)
- The Accusing Finger (1936) – Convict (uncredited)
- Winterset (1936) – Tommy (uncredited)
- Banjo on My Knee (1936) – Sailor (uncredited)
- Counterfeit Lady (1936) – Cab Driver (uncredited)
- We Who Are About to Die (1937) – Prison Lab Technician (uncredited)
- The Devil's Playground (1937) – Civilian (uncredited)
- When's Your Birthday? (1937) – Fight Arena Attendant (uncredited)
- Step Lively, Jeeves! (1937) – Gangster (uncredited)
- Midnight Taxi (1937) – Sailor (uncredited)
- Internes Can't Take Money (1937) – Man in Bookie's Office (uncredited)
- I Promise to Pay (1937) – 2nd Steerer (uncredited)
- They Gave Him a Gun (1937) – Soldier (uncredited)
- Wings Over Honolulu (1937) – Marine (uncredited)
- There Goes My Girl (1937) – Rethburn's Henchman (uncredited)
- San Quentin (1937) – Young Convict (uncredited)
- Armored Car (1937) – Shadow (uncredited)
- Meet the Missus (1937) – Photographer (uncredited)
- Anything for a Thrill (1937) – Joe
- Born Reckless (1937) – Mobster (uncredited)
- The Man Who Cried Wolf (1937) – Taxi Driver (uncredited)
- Carnival Queen (1937) – Dancer (uncredited)
- Live, Love and Learn (1937) – Sailor (uncredited)
- Portia on Trial (1937) – Reporter (uncredited)
- Submarine D-1 (1937) – Bluejacket at Panama (uncredited)
- Missing Witnesses (1937) – Taxi Driver (uncredited)
- Bringing Up Baby (1938) – Joe (uncredited)
- Over the Wall (1938) – Prison Photographer (uncredited)
- Dick Tracy Returns (1938, Serial) – Railroad Siding Thug (uncredited)
- The Spellbinder (1939) – Taxi Driver (uncredited)
- The Day the Bookies Wept (1939) – Taxi Driver with Mustache (uncredited)
- Those High Grey Walls (1939) – Convict (uncredited)
- Little Accident (1939) – Taxi Driver (uncredited)
- One Hour to Live (1939) – Cab driver
- Where Did You Get That Girl? (1941) – Cab Driver (uncredited)
- Footsteps in the Dark (1941) – Reporter (uncredited)
- Adventures of Captain Marvel (1941, Serial) – Gus – Henchman [Ch. 8] (uncredited)
- Caught in the Draft (1941) – Private Twitchell (uncredited)
- Sergeant York (1941) – Beardsley (uncredited)
- One Foot in Heaven (1941) – Soldier (uncredited)
- Appointment for Love (1941) – Reporter (uncredited)
- Nazi Agent (1942) – Sailor (uncredited)
- Born to Sing (1942) – Taxi Driver (uncredited)
- True to the Army (1942) – Private (uncredited)
- Gang Busters (1942, Serial) – Garage Attendant [Ch. 2] (uncredited)
- Ship Ahoy (1942) – Stagehand (uncredited)
- Saboteur (1942) – Man in Newsreel Truck (uncredited)
- Fingers at the Window (1942) – Cabbie with Cat (uncredited)
- Remember Pearl Harbor (1942) – Officer (uncredited)
- Tarzan's New York Adventure (1942) – Second Cab Driver (uncredited)
- Danger in the Pacific (1942) – Mechanic (uncredited)
- They All Kissed the Bride (1942) – Truck Driver (uncredited)
- Calling Dr. Gillespie (1942) – Coronet Mechanic (uncredited)
- X Marks the Spot (1942) – Truck Driver (uncredited)
- Pittsburgh (1942) – Miner (uncredited)
- Madame Spy (1942) – Cab Driver (uncredited)
- The Adventures of Smilin' Jack (1943, Serial) – Driver of Car 5 (uncredited)
- Air Force (1943) – Minor Role (uncredited)
- Calling Dr. Death (1943) – Reporter (uncredited)
- The Fighting Seabees (1944) – Construction Worker Who Dies (uncredited)
- Gambler's Choice (1944) – Chappie's Friend (uncredited)
- The Tiger Woman (1944, Serial) Burt (uncredited)
- Man from Frisco (1944) – Tough Guy (uncredited)
- Christmas Holiday (1944) – Bellhop (uncredited)
- Wing and a Prayer (1944) – Sailor (uncredited)
- Rainbow Island (1944) – Merchant Marine Seaman (uncredited)
- My Buddy (1944) – Joe (uncredited)
- Irish Eyes Are Smiling (1944) – Hoofer (uncredited)
- Murder in the Blue Room (1944) – Curtin
- Identity Unknown (1945) – Frankie
- Crime, Inc. (1945) – Bill the Cab Driver
- The Man from Oklahoma (1945) – Tom (uncredited)
- Federal Operator 99 (1945, Serial) – Mack (uncredited)
- Anchors Aweigh (1945) – Shore Patrol Officer (uncredited)
- Incendiary Blonde (1945) – Vettori Bodyguard (uncredited)
- The Hidden Eye (1945) – Taxi Driver (uncredited)
- What Next, Corporal Hargrove? (1945) – Mess Sergeant (uncredited)
- Road to Utopia (1945) – Sailor Reporting to Head Purser (uncredited)
- Live Wires (1946) – Red (uncredited)
- Smooth as Silk (1946) – Reporter (uncredited)
- The People's Choice (1946) – Charles Butler
- Devil Bat's Daughter (1946) – Taxi Driver (uncredited)
- The Dark Corner (1946) – First Cab Driver (uncredited)
- Dark Alibi (1946) – Barker (uncredited)
- One Exciting Week (1946) – Reporter (uncredited)
- Don't Gamble with Strangers (1946) – Trigger Man (uncredited)
- In Fast Company (1946) – John Cassidy (uncredited)
- Night and Day (1946) – Army Driver (uncredited)
- Two Guys from Milwaukee (1946) – Taxicab Driver (uncredited)
- Notorious (1946) – Photographer (uncredited)
- Down Missouri Way (1946) – Film Crewman (uncredited)
- Under Nevada Skies (1946) – Henchman Burns (uncredited)
- Sioux City Sue (1946) – Bartender Keno (uncredited)
- Bringing Up Father (1946) – Pugugly (uncredited)
- San Quentin (1946) – Higgins (uncredited)
- The Mighty McGurk (1947) – Mug (uncredited)
- The Man I Love (1947) – Sign Man (uncredited)
- That Way with Women (1947) – Bum (uncredited)
- It Happened in Brooklyn (1947) – Minor Role (uncredited)
- Hit Parade of 1947 (1947) – Counterman (uncredited)
- Buck Privates Come Home (1947) – Tie Buyer (uncredited)
- Bulldog Drummond at Bay (1947) – Teeples (uncredited)
- Possessed (1947) – Cafe Proprietor (uncredited)
- Living in a Big Way (1947) – Reporter (uncredited)
- Brute Force (1947) – Convict (uncredited)
- The Secret Life of Walter Mitty (1947) – Taxcab Driver (uncredited)
- Bulldog Drummond Strikes Back (1947) – Williams
- Magic Town (1947) – Moving Man (uncredited)
- Merton of the Movies (1947) – Ernie – Prop Man (uncredited)
- Big Town After Dark (1947) – Hoodlum in LaRue's Office (uncredited)
- High Wall (1947) – Patient in Solitary (uncredited)
- Killer McCoy (1947) – Fight Doctor (uncredited)
- If You Knew Susie (1948) – Bennie – Steve's Henchman (uncredited)
- Mr. Reckless (1948) – Taxicab Driver (uncredited)
- Shed No Tears (1948) – Cab Driver (uncredited)
- The Babe Ruth Story (1948) – Barfly (uncredited)
- Beyond Glory (1948) – West Point Boxing Instructor (uncredited)
- They Live by Night (1948) – Robert Mansfield, Mattie's Husband (uncredited)
- Joan of Arc (1948) – Guard (uncredited)
- Fighter Squadron (1948) – Sergeant Mike aka Nailhead – Ground Crew Chief (uncredited)
- Strike It Rich (1948) – Harris – Man in Domino Saloon (uncredited)
- Let's Live a Little (1948) – Taxi Driver (uncredited)
- A Woman's Secret (1949) – Reporter (uncredited)
- Miss Mink of 1949 (1949) – Thug (uncredited)
- A Kiss in the Dark (1949) – Taxi Driver (uncredited)
- Without Honor (1949) – 1st Television Installer
- Always Leave Them Laughing (1949) – Photographer (uncredited)
- No Man of Her Own (1950) – Steve, Cab Driver (uncredited)
- The Great Rupert (1950) – Dave – the Mailman (uncredited)
- Perfect Strangers (1950) – Reporter (uncredited)
- Barricade (1950) – Brandy
- Quicksand (1950) – Watchman
- In a Lonely Place (1950) – Dave (uncredited)
- The Admiral Was a Lady (1950) – Bus Driver #2 – Santa Fe Line (uncredited)
- Kiss Tomorrow Goodbye (1950) – Joe – Milkman (uncredited)
- Triple Trouble (1950) – Red, Ma's Henchman
- Pretty Baby (1950) – Taxi Driver (uncredited)
- The Sun Sets at Dawn (1950) – Truck Driver (uncredited)
- Storm Warning (1951) – Al (uncredited)
- Cry Danger (1951) – Delicatessen Proprietor (uncredited)
- Badman's Gold (1951) – Jake – Henchman
- I Was a Communist for the FBI (1951) – Worker (uncredited)
- Never Trust a Gambler (1951) – Gas Station Attendant (uncredited)
- Iron Man (1951) – Speed's Trainer (uncredited)
- Flying Leathernecks (1951) – Taxi Driver (uncredited)
- Roadblock (1951) – Policeman at Brissard's (uncredited)
- Journey Into Light (1951) – Parishioner (uncredited)
- Drums in the Deep South (1951) – Confederate Soldier (uncredited)
- Come Fill the Cup (1951) – Bucky Blake (uncredited)
- The Racket (1951) – Pedestrian with Morning Newspaper (uncredited)
- Cattle Queen (1951) – Stage Driver
- Captain Video: Master of the Stratosphere (1951, Serial) – Henchman [Chs. 13–14] (uncredited)
- The Bushwackers (1952) – Peter Sharpe
- Steel Town (1952) – Taxi Driver (uncredited)
- Carson City (1952) – Miner (uncredited)
- The Winning Team (1952) – Taxi Driver (uncredited)
- Ma and Pa Kettle at the Fair (1952) – Man at Accident (uncredited)
- Park Row (1952) – Policeman (uncredited)
- Bonzo Goes to College (1952) – Tropicana Fruit Company Foreman (uncredited)
- My Pal Gus (1952) – Delivery Man (uncredited)
- Because of You (1952) – Second Man (uncredited)
- Stop, You're Killing Me (1952) – Taxi Driver (uncredited)
- Girls in the Night (1953) – Theater Manager (uncredited)
- Trouble Along the Way (1953) – Drunk in Bar with Dog (uncredited)
- Abbott and Costello Go to Mars (1953) – Bartender (uncredited)
- The System (1953) – Maxie, Man in Line-Up (uncredited)
- Split Second (1953) – Reporter Charlie (uncredited)
- Devil's Canyon (1953) – Pete (uncredited)
- Walking My Baby Back Home (1953) – Drunk (uncredited)
- The French Line (1953) – Reporter (uncredited)
- The Boy from Oklahoma (1954) – Barfly (uncredited)
- Johnny Guitar (1954) – Frank – Bartender (uncredited)
- The Long Wait (1954) – Pop Henderson
- Shield for Murder (1954) – Contact Man With Tickets (uncredited)
- A Star Is Born (1954) – Shrine Auditorium Photographer (uncredited)
- Naked Alibi (1954) – Drunk (uncredited)
- Adventures of the Texas Kid: Border Ambush (1954) – Barton – Henchman
- The Americano (1955) – Captain of Ship
- Cell 2455 Death Row (1955) – Prisoner in Car with Whit (uncredited)
- Ma and Pa Kettle at Waikiki (1955) – Chauffeur (uncredited)
- The Naked Street (1955) – Police Detective (uncredited)
- Bengazi (1955) – Officer Walsh (uncredited)
- Lucy Gallant (1955) – Ben Nolan (uncredited)
- The Man with the Golden Arm (1955) – Yantek (uncredited)
- The Square Jungle (1955) – Kane (uncredited)
- Three for Jamie Dawn (1956) – Mr. Peterson (uncredited)
- He Laughed Last (1956) – Speakeasy Guard (uncredited)
- Tension at Table Rock (1956) – Ruffian (uncredited)
- Julie (1956) – Police Guard #2 (uncredited)
- Hot Shots (1956) – Henry – Bartender (uncredited)
- Alfred Hitchcock Presents (1957) (Season 3 Episode 9: "The Young One") as Bartender
- Alfred Hitchcock Presents (1957) (Season 3 Episode 13: "Night of the Execution") as Judge
- The Garment Jungle (1957) – Truck Driver (uncredited)
- All Mine to Give (1957) – Hanson (uncredited)
- Chicago Confidential (1957) – Nightclub Patron (uncredited)
- The Three Faces of Eve (1957) – Hotel Clerk (uncredited)
- Rockabilly Baby (1957) – Drunken Man
- Escape from Red Rock (1957) – Manager
- Man from God's Country (1958) – Piano Player (uncredited)
- The Sheepman (1958) – Barney – Townsman (uncredited)
- Screaming Mimi (1958) – Ben, Yellow Cab Driver (uncredited)
- The Last Hurrah (1958) – (uncredited)
- Lone Texan (1959) – Charlie (uncredited)
- North by Northwest (1959) – Taxi Driver (uncredited)
- Go Naked in the World (1961) – Private Detective (uncredited)
- A Fever in the Blood (1961) – Reporter (uncredited) (final film role)
