= The Farmer in the Dell (film) =

1936 film directed by Ben Holmes

- Theatrical poster for the picture
- Directed by: Ben Holmes
- Written by: Sam Mintz; John Grey
- Based on: Farmer in the Dell by Phil Stong
- Produced by: Robert Sisk
- Starring: Fred Stone; Jean Parker; Esther Dale
- Cinematography: Nick Musuraca
- Edited by: George Hively
- Music by: Alberto Colombo
- Production company: RKO Radio Pictures
- Release dates: March 5, 1936 (New York premiere); March 27, 1936
- Running time: 67 minutes
- Country: United States
- Language: English

The Farmer in the Dell is a 1936 American comedy film directed by Ben Holmes from a screenplay by Sam Mintz and John Grey, adapted from Phil Stong's 1935 novel, which was similarly titled, Farmer in the Dell. The film was premiered by RKO Radio Pictures in New York City on March 6, 1936, and released widely later that month on March 27. It stars Fred Stone (making his film debut), Jean Parker, and Esther Dale.

== Plot ==
Ma and Pa Boyer work a small farm in Iowa, where they live with their daughter, Adie. Adie is dating her high school sweetheart, Davy Davenport. Ma thinks that Adie is pretty enough to be in the movies, and convinces Pa to sell the farm and move the family to Hollywood. Once there, Ma obtains a pair of passes to a studio, and convinces Pa to take Adie the following day. Once on the set, they watch director Chester Hart as he films a scene about farm life. As the filming proceeds, Pa offers some common sense hints on how to do things correctly. Hart enjoys Pa's honesty and offers him a small role in the film.

Pa doesn't tell Ma about his acting job, and the following day Ma invites Nicky Ranovitch, whom she believes to be an important Hollywood producer over for dinner. Nicky, however, is not a producer, but a money hungry con-artist who believes that the Boyers are wealthy. Pa becomes infuriated with Ma's ambitions for Adie, and in frustration confesses that he was given a role in the film. Ma sees this as angle to help Adie break into pictures and is delighted by the news.

After a few days shooting the picture, Pa is disillusioned, and wants to quit. Hart, fearing that Pa is being lured away by another studio, talks his studio into offering Pa a $600 a week contract. Unable to turn down such a lucrative offer, Pa agrees. Ma is ecstatic at the news. Pa has to go film on location for a few days. While he is away, Ma begins spending money like it is going out of style. She buys a new house and many extras. When Pa returns home, he arrives in the midst of a lavish party Ma is throwing, whose guest list includes Ranovitch and many of his friends. Adie has become enamored by the slick-talking foreigner, and has begun to hang around with him. This is another shock for Pa, who announces that he's not rich, and intends to return to Iowa, hoping everything will then return to normal. Ranovitch, aware now of the financial situation of the Boyers, leaves, and Adie is reconciled with Davenport. Ma promises to amend her ways, and convinces Pa not to return to Iowa. He agrees, and resumes his acting career.

== Cast ==
- Fred Stone as Ernest "Pa" Boyer
- Jean Parker as Adie Boyer
- Esther Dale as Loudellia "Ma" Boyer
- Moroni Olsen as Chester Hart
- Frank Albertson as Davy Davenport
- Maxine Jennings as Maud Durant
- Ray Mayer as Spike
- Lucille Ball as Gloria Wilson
- Rafael Corio as Nicky Ranovitch
- Frank Jenks as Bill Crosby
- Spencer Charters as Crosby, the milkman
- Fern Emmett as Apartment manager
- Margaret Armstrong as Iowa neighbor
- Edward Keane as Robert F. Heath
- Richard Tucker as Lou Wagner

(cast list as per AFI database)

== Production ==
In August 1935 RKO bought the rights to the novel, The Farmer in the Dell, by Phil Stong. The book had been serialized in the Saturday Evening Post. The following month, Fred Stone was cast in the leading role of Pa Boyer, while it was announced that Cliff Reid would assume the producing duties. Initially the adaptation of the novel was given to John Twist and Joel Sayre. By the end of September, Reid had been replaced by a new associate producer at RKO, Robert Sisk. It would be Sisk's second film as the supervising producer, after Chatterbox (originally titled Long Ago Ladies). In late October, RKO announced that the film had begun pre-production, and the studio selected Ben Holmes to direct the picture. It would be Holmes first feature-length film; he had been directing shorts for the studio since 1929. In December it was revealed that Twist and Sayre had been replaced on the screen adaptation by Sam Mintz and John Grey, which was scheduled to begin production on December 16. Moroni Olsen was added to the cast in mid-December, shortly after which RKO announced that Jean Parker and Frank Albertson would playing opposite one another in the film. Filming on the picture began the last week of 1935. In early January 1936 Spencer Charters and Margaret Armstrong joined the cast, at the same time it became known that Esther Dale was also part of the production. By mid-January other cast members were revealed when Rafael Corjo was added to the cast, those actors were Ray Mayer, Maxine Jennings, and Lucille Ball. At that time it was also announced that Harry Jans and Horace Murphy were to be included in the cast, but they do not appear in the AFI's final cast list. The film finished production in early February, three days ahead of schedule. The film premiered at the Palace in New York City on Thursday, March 5, 1936.

== Reception ==
Harrison's Reports enjoyed the picture, calling it a nice "homespun comedy". They applauded Stone's performance, as well as the romantic chemistry between Parker and Albertson. They also complimented Olsen in his role as the movie director. They did not enjoy the film's pace however, finding it a bit slow. "A wholly human, often highly amusing story," was how Motion Picture Daily described the film. They found it an engaging comedy, with tinges of drama interspersed throughout. The magazine particularly enjoyed the performance of Stone, who they compared favorably to Will Rogers.
