= Owen Davis Jr. =

American actor

Owen Gould Davis Jr.
- Born: October 6, 1907; New York City, U.S.
- Died: May 21, 1949 (aged 41); Long Island Sound, New York, U.S.
- Occupation: Actor
- Years active: 1929–1940
- Spouse: Laina Muroni

Owen Gould Davis Jr. (October 6, 1907 – May 21, 1949) was an American actor known primarily for his work in film. He also performed in the theatre, making his Broadway debut in the play Carry On (1928), which his father, Owen Davis, had written.

== Biography ==
Born in 1907 in New York City, Davis Jr. was the son of dramatist Owen Davis and his wife, actress Elizabeth Breyer. In 1923 his father won the Pulitzer Prize for drama for his play Icebound. When he was young, his parents opposed his having any involvement in acting.

Educated at The Choate School and Yale University, Davis was one of the leading students in the drama school. He was chosen captain of the boxing team.

On stage, Davis made his Broadway debut in the play Carry On (1928), written by his father Owen Davis. He soon began working in film, making his screen debut with Walter Huston. Later he toured on stage with Huston. After gaining more stage experience, Davis went to Hollywood and began to specialize in movies.

For the summer of 1929, Davis appeared as the "juvenile" in the Summer stock cast at the legendary Elitch Theatre.

Davis served in the United States Army during World War II.< Afterward, he became a television producer. Shows produced by Davis included The Chevrolet Tele-Theatre.

He married Laina Muroni.

Davis died on May 21, 1949. He drowned on Long Island Sound. On May 25, 1949, the Nassau County medical examiner ruled that the drowning was accidental.

== Filmography ==
Year	Title	Role	Notes
1929	They Had to See Paris	Ross Peters	
1930	All Quiet on the Western Front	Peter	
1930	Good Intentions	Bud Finney	
1936	Murder on a Bridle Path	Edward 'Eddie' Fry	
1936	Special Investigator	George Fenwick	
1936	Bunker Bean	Bunker Bean	
1936	Grand Jury	Steve O'Connell	
1936	The Plot Thickens	Robert Wilkins	
1937	The Woman I Love	Mezziores	
1937	It Could Happen to You!	Fred Barrett	
1937	Luck of Roaring Camp	Davy	
1938	Touchdown, Army	Cadet Kirk Reynolds	
1939	These Glamour Girls	Greg Smith	
1939	Henry Goes Arizona	Danny Regan	
1939	Thou Shalt Not Kill	Allen Stevens	
1940	Knute Rockne All American	Gus Dorais	(final film role)
