= We're on the Jury =

1937 American film directed by Ben Holmes

- Directed by: Ben Holmes
- Screenplay by: Franklin Coen
- Produced by: Lee Marcus; Joseph Henry Steele
- Starring: Victor Moore; Helen Broderick; Louise Latimer
- Cinematography: Nick Musuraca
- Edited by: Ted Cheesman; John Lockert
- Music by: Roy Webb
- Production company: RKO Radio Pictures
- Distributed by: RKO Radio Pictures
- Release dates: February 11, 1937 (Premiere-New York City); February 12, 1937 (US)
- Running time: 71 minutes
- Country: United States
- Language: English

We're on the Jury is a 1937 American comedy film directed by Ben Holmes and starring Victor Moore, Helen Broderick and Louise Latimer. The screenplay by Franklin Coen was based on the 1929 play, Ladies of the Jury, written by John Frederick Ballard. The film was produced by RKO Radio Pictures, which premiered it in New York City on February 11, 1937, with a national release the following day on February 12. The film received mixed reviews, one reviewer stated Broderick and Moore's performances "redeem an otherwise mediocre picture."

== Cast ==
- Victor Moore as Mr. J. Clarence 'Pudgy' Beaver
- Helen Brodericka s Mrs. Agnes Dean, aka Mrs. Jonathan Ashley Dean
- Phillip Huston as Mr. Steve Bell
- Louise Latimer as Mrs. Harry Clyde
- Vinton Hayworth as Mr. M. Williams - Defense Attorney
- Robert McWade as Judge Henry Prime
- Maxine Jennings as Miss Clara Simpson, Patterson's maid
- Frank M. Thomas as Mr. D. Van Cobb- Prosecutor
- Colleen Clare as Mrs. Charmaine Patterson
- Billy Gilbert as Mr. Ephraim Allen
- Charles Lane as Mr. Horace Smith
- Charles Middleton as Mr. B.J. Martin - Jury Foreman
- Jean Howard as Miss Marion Gordon
- Leonid Kinskey as Professor Nicholas Krakin
- Sarah Edwards as Miss Evelyn Bottomley
- Hal K. Dawson as Mr. John Weatherman
- Edward Gargan as Police Officer Clark
- Earle Foxe as Mr. Thomas Jeffreys
- Roy James as Dr. Alex 'Doc' Fields
