= Maxine Jennings =

American actress (1909–1991)

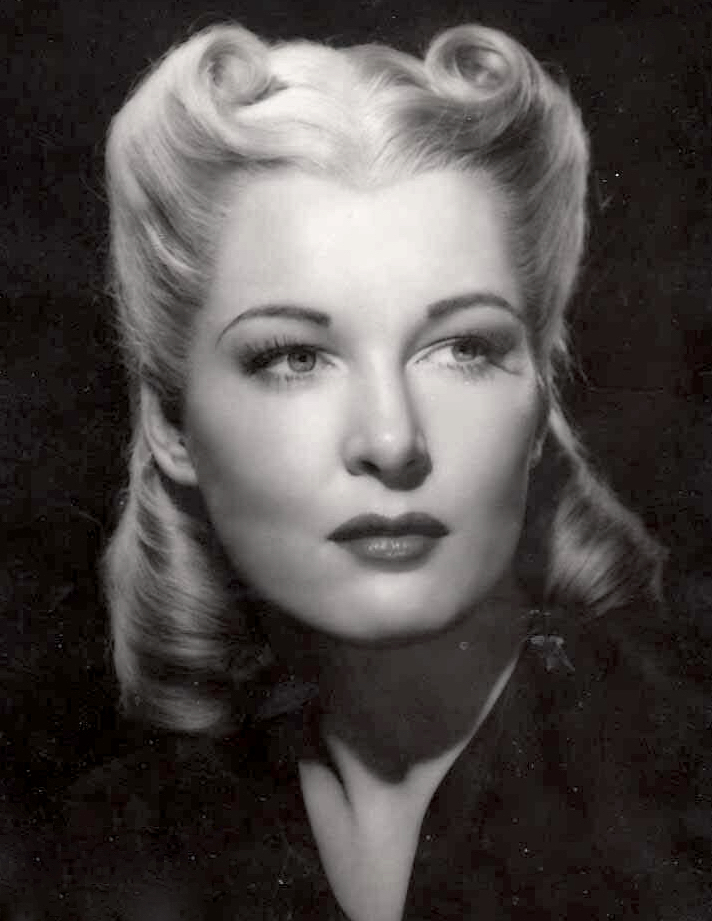
- Jennings in 1940
- Born: March 9, 1908; Portland, Oregon, U.S.
- Died: January 11, 1991 (aged 82); Riverside, California, U.S.
- Education: University of Oregon
- Occupation: Actress

Maxine Bliss Jennings (March 8, 1909 – January 11, 1991) was an American actress.

== Early years ==
Jennings was born and raised in Portland, Oregon, the daughter of Dr. Phillip Bliss Jennings and his wife. During her time as a student at the University of Oregon, she won eight swimming championships. On July 31, 1926, at age 17, Jennings won the Miss Portland beauty pageant, which entitled her to participate in the Miss America contest.

== Career ==
In Paris, Jennings was a model for women's clothing designed by Jean Patou. During her modeling years, she was featured on magazine covers. She also sang on radio and was the original Old Gold Girl. On stage, Jennings appeared in Show Boat, Earl Carroll's Vanities, and Ziegfeld Follies.

Her film debut came in a bit role in Girl Crazy. Her other films included Chatterbox (1936), Second Wife (1936) Walking on Air (1936) and You Can't Buy Luck (1937). “Mr Wong, Detective” (1938).

== Personal life ==
On September 26, 1936, Jennings married animated cartoon film producer Rudolf Ising in Las Vegas, Nevada. She and radio producer Ed Byron were married on May 17, 1940. She married Philip Leverett Saltonstall on February 23, 1946. They had one daughter and were divorced in 1947.

== Death ==
Jennings died on January 11, 1991, in Riverside, California.

== Selected filmography ==
- Roberta (1935)
- Old Man Rhythm (1935)
- Walking on Air (1936)
- The Witness Chair (1936)
- The Last Outlaw (1936)
- The Farmer in the Dell (1936)
- Muss 'em Up (1936)
- Make Way for a Lady (1936)
- Follow the Fleet (1936)
- Don't Turn 'em Loose (1936)
- You Can't Buy Luck (1937)
- We're on the Jury (1937)
- There Goes My Girl (1937)
- Breakfast for Two (1937)
- The Big Shot (1937)
- On Again-Off Again (1937)
- Mr. Wong, Detective (1938)
- G.I. War Brides (1946)

Source: AllMovie
