= Knute Rockne, All American =

1940 film by William K. Howard, Lloyd Bacon

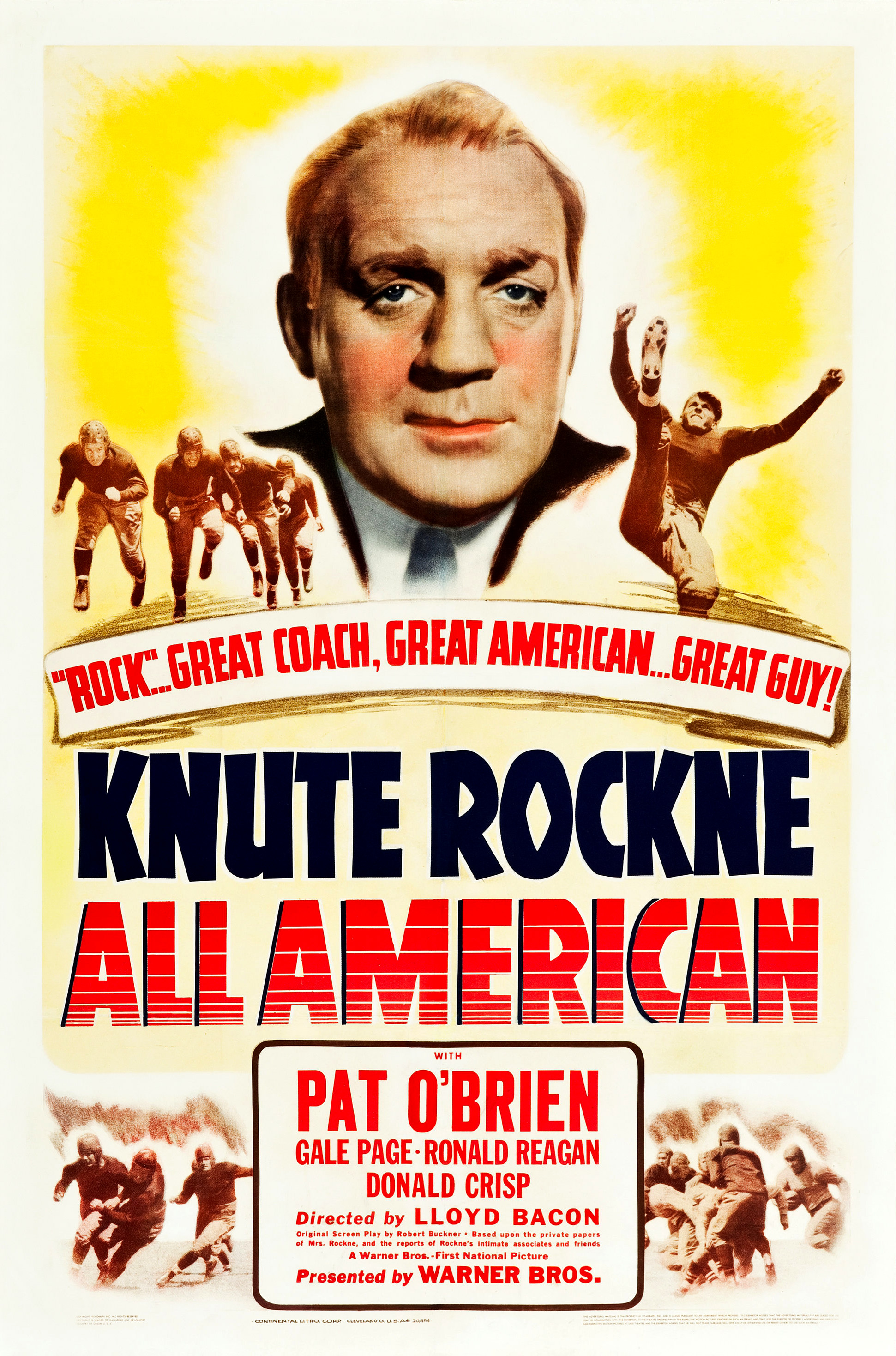
- Theatrical release poster
- Directed by: Lloyd Bacon; William K. Howard (uncredited)
- Written by: Robert Buckner
- Produced by: Hal B. Wallis (Exec prod)
- Starring: Pat O'Brien; Gale Page; Ronald Reagan
- Cinematography: Tony Gaudio
- Edited by: Ralph Dawson
- Music by: Heinz Roemheld (uncredited)
- Distributed by: Warner Bros. Pictures
- Release date: October 4, 1940 (South Bend, Indiana premiere)
- Running time: 98 minutes
- Country: United States
- Language: English
- Budget: $645,618

Knute Rockne, All American is a 1940 American biographical film that tells the story of Knute Rockne, Notre Dame's legendary football coach. It stars Pat O'Brien as Rockne and Ronald Reagan as player George Gipp, as well as Gale Page, Donald Crisp, Albert Bassermann, Owen Davis Jr., Nick Lukats, Kane Richmond, William Marshall, and William Byrne. The film also includes cameos by football coaches "Pop" Warner, Amos Alonzo Stagg, William H. Spaulding, and Howard Jones, playing themselves. It also has a cameo by Olympic star Jim Thorpe.

Reagan's presidential campaign revived interest in the film, and as a result, some reporters called him the Gipper.

The movie was written by Robert Buckner and directed by Lloyd Bacon, who replaced William K. Howard after filming had begun. In 1997, the film was deemed "culturally, historically, or aesthetically significant" by the United States Library of Congress and selected for preservation in the National Film Registry.

== Plot ==
Lars Knutson Rockne, a carriage builder, moves his family from Norway in 1892, settling in Chicago. His son, Knute, saves up his money and enrolls in college at the Notre Dame campus near South Bend, Indiana, where he plays football.

Rockne and teammate Gus Dorais star in Notre Dame's 35–13 upset over Army at West Point in 1913. The game is historically significant as Notre Dame employed the seldom-used forward pass to great effect. The publicity from the Fighting Irish's surprise win creates Notre Dame football fans around the country.

After graduation, Rockne marries his sweetheart Bonnie Skiles and stays on at Notre Dame to teach chemistry, work on synthetic rubber in the chemistry lab under Father Julius Nieuwland, and in his spare time serve as an assistant coach of the Fighting Irish football team under head coach Jesse Harper.

Outstanding freshman halfback George Gipp leads the Irish to greater gridiron glory. Gipp is stricken with a fatal illness after the final game of the 1920 season. On his death bed, he encourages Rockne to someday tell the team to "win one for the Gipper."

Notre Dame continues its football success with a backfield of stars dubbed the Four Horsemen. Rockne is killed in a 1931 plane crash on a trip to California, but his legend makes him a campus immortal.

== Cast ==
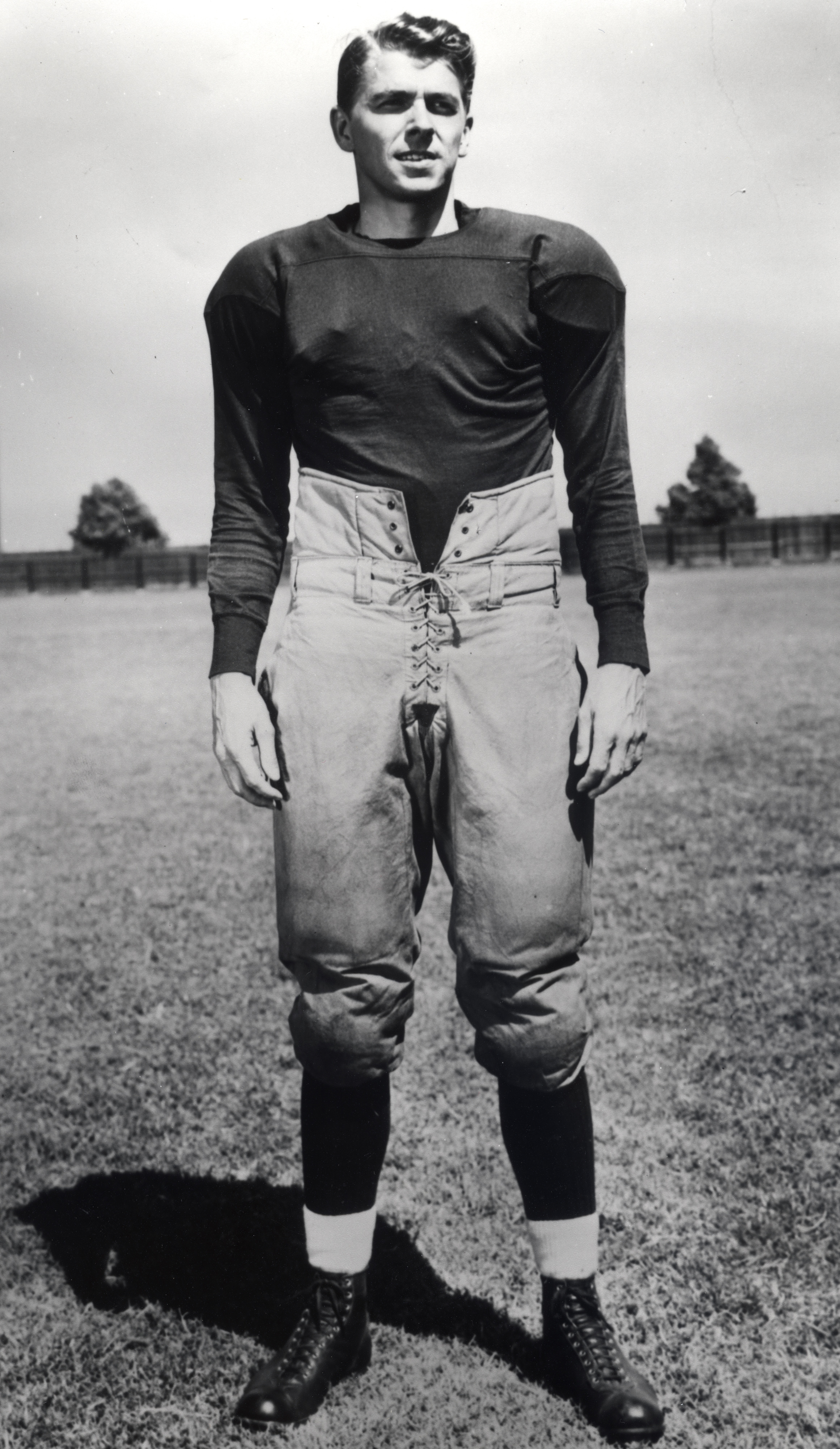
Ronald Reagan on the set of the film as George Gipp

- Pat O'Brien as Knute Rockne
- Gale Page as Bonnie Skiles Rockne
- Ronald Reagan as George Gipp
- Donald Crisp as Father John Cavanaugh
- Albert Bassermann as Father Julius Nieuwland
- John Litel as Committee Chairman
- Henry O'Neill as Doctor
- Owen Davis Jr. as Gus Dorais
- John Qualen as Lars Knutson Rockne
- Dorothy Tree as Martha Rockne
- Johnny Sheffield as Knute, age 7
- Howard Jones as Himself
- Glenn "Pop" Warner as Himself
- Jim Thorpe as Himself
- Alonzo Stagg as Himself
- William "Bill" Spaulding as Himself
- Kane Richmond as Elmer Layden
- William Marshall as Don Miller
- William Byrne as Jim Crowley
- Nick Lukats as Harry Stuhldreher. Also a technical advisor for the film

== Reception ==
Bosley Crowther of The New York Times called the film "one of the best pictures for boys in years" and wrote that O'Brien conveyed "a valid impression of an iron-willed, dynamic and cryptic fellow who could very well be 'Rock.' As a memorial to a fine and inspiring molder of character in young men, this picture ranks high. But, like the Carnegie Foundation has done on previous occasions, we are inclined to question its overemphasis of the pigskin sport."

Variety called the film "one of the best biographical picturizations ever turned out ... Pat O'Brien delivers a fine characterization of the immortal Rockne, catching the spirit of the role with an understanding of the human qualities of the man."

Film Daily wrote: "Pat O'Brien's life-like Rockne is brilliantly delineated; it's as though Rockne himself were striding across the field once more."

Harrison's Reports wrote: "Very good! It is the first football picture produced without any 'hokum'; it shows how teams are developed and what the game means to both players and coach ... The football scenes should prove thrilling to all."

John Mosher of The New Yorker wrote that the story had been "suitably handled for its public of energetic young people and South Bend alumni."

The film is recognized by American Film Institute in these lists:

- 2005: AFI's 100 Years ... 100 Movie Quotes:
  - Knute Rockne: "Tell 'em to go out there with all they got and win just one for the Gipper." – #89

== "Win just one for the Gipper" ==
The last thing George said to me, 'Rock,' he said, 'sometime when the team is up against it and the breaks are beating the boys, ask them to go out there with all they've got and win just one for the Gipper.'

This quote ranked No. 89 on the American Film Institute's 100 Years...100 Movie Quotes list. However, for many years during which United Artists held the rights, the Gipper sequence was cut for television showings. For the film's initial release to home video, MGM/UA restored the sequence as part of the original uncut version, and this is the version that has been used for all home video, television and theatrical reissues since.

The phrase "win one for the Gipper" was later used as a political slogan by Ronald Reagan, who was often referred to as the Gipper because he had played the role of George Gipp in Knute Rockne, All American. At the 1988 Republican National Convention, Reagan told his vice president George H. W. Bush, "George, go out there and win one for the Gipper." Bob Dole used the phrase at the 1996 Republican National Convention, as did President George W. Bush at the 2004 Republican National Convention in his acceptance speech when he stated "We can now truly win one for the Gipper" shortly after Reagan's death.

The line is spoken by the dying pilot Al Ross in the 1964 film Flight to Fury.

The speech is parodied in the film Airplane!, which was released when Reagan was running for the presidency in 1980.

== Historical accuracy ==
Neither Notre Dame nor the NCAA recognizes Knute Rockne as a (first team) All-American.

Knute Rockne gives the famous "win one for the Gipper," speech at halftime of the 1930 game during his final championship season, but the speech was actually given at halftime of the 1928 game during a season in which Notre Dame finished with a 5–4 record.

== See also ==
- List of American football films
- Jack Chevigny
