= Lee Marcus =

American film producer (1893-1969)

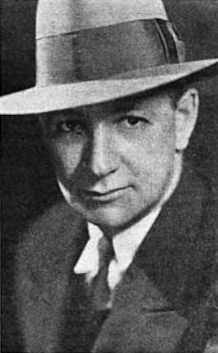
- Born: December 7, 1893; Buffalo, New York, United States
- Died: January 30, 1969 (aged 75); Los Angeles County, California, United States
- Occupation: Producer
- Years active: 1934–1947

Lee Marcus (December 7, 1893 – January 30, 1969), also known as Lee S. Marcus, was an American film producer of the 1930s and 1940s. During his fifteen-year career he produced over 85 films, most of them between 1934 and 1941 while he was at RKO Studios. Prior to his production career, Marcus worked for FBO and then RKO as a sales executive, reaching the level of vice president in both organizations. At RKO, he was head of production of the studio's b-films during the late 1930s and the beginning of the 1940s. He was also responsible for producing what many consider to be the first film noir, 1940's Stranger on the Third Floor.

== Early life ==
Marcus was born on December 7, 1893, in Buffalo, New York. His father was Albert L. Marcus. During World War I Marcus served with the American Expeditionary Force (AEF), and in 1918 was stationed in Vitry, France.

== Career ==
=== Early career ===
Growing up in Buffalo, Marcus was an avid theater-goer, attending the performances of many stock theater companies who passed through the city.

Early in his career, he worked for various film distributors. In 1921, he represented W.A.S. Douglas who directed a film for Jawitz Pictures, entitled Watered Stock (later retitled Beware of the Law), in the sale of its domestic and international rights. By the beginning of 1924 he was working for Film Booking Offices of America (FBO). In July 1925 it was announced that he would be the head of sales at FBO, following the death of Harry Berman. In December 1925 Marcus penned an article for The Film Daily extolling the virtues of film shorts, and warning exhibitors against the dangers of overlooking the use of shorts. In 1927 Marcus was one of three film industry executives who formed a committee to produce a trailer meant to show the industry in a good light. The other members of the committee were Al Lichtman of United Artists and Edmund Grainger of 20th Century Fox. Also in 1927, Marcus continued his championing of the film short. In June he announced a list of well-known writers who would be responsible for penning the shorts for FBO. The list included cartoonists Bill Nolan and Fontaine Fox, and short story writer H. C. Witwer. Marcus began reorganizing the sales management and districts within FBO in September 1927. First he promoted his future partner, Charles Rosenzweig, to head the district overseeing FBO's New York State district, and then completely reorganized the mid-west districts. In February 1928 FBO planned a jubilee in honor of the second anniversary of Joseph Kennedy's involvement as owner of FBO. As part of that event, Marcus took the rare step of giving authority to his sales force to directly approve contracts with exhibitors.

=== Producing film shorts ===
In June 1928 Marcus created a separate department to focus on selling film shorts. To lead the new division, Marcus put Cleve Adams in charge. Before the year was out Marcus was promoted to Vice President of FBO, and he predicted that 1929 would be the turning point of the motion picture industry, with the advent of sound. He felt that every theater in the country would be equipped to show the new talking pictures before the end of the decade.

With the integration of FBO into the new RKO Radio Pictures in 1929, Marcus became the executive vice-president for the new company. He, along with Joseph I. Schnitzer and William LeBaron, were the triumvirate which ran the new company. In February, Marcus announced that the new RCA Photophone process of sound on film was the direction the studio would go in, rather than the alternative of sound on disc. He stated, "Our synthesis of sound to action is all that we would want in accuracy, and certainly the exhibitor's projection and sound problem is, to our mind, a much simplified one with sound-on-film." With sound films becoming the norm, Marcus announced that RKO would still produce 40–50 per cent of their sound films with silent versions as well in 1929. Later in 1929 Marcus was one of the film executives on a committee representing film distributors in their negotiations with exhibition houses in trying to iron out a deal regarding splitting the revenue from movie showings.

Hiram S. Brown, head of RKO, named Marcus as his liaison officer, splitting his time between Hollywood and New York at the beginning of January 1932. He moved from being RKO's general sales manager. By April 1932 Marcus was a vice-president of RKO Radio Pictures, in charge of east coast production, as well as being the liaison between the distribution and production departments. Marcus, along with his partner, Charles Rosenzweig, began to organize a film distributing company in March 1933, intending to distribute 26 independent films during the 1933–34 season. In March 1933 Marcus became the assistant to Lou Brock, who was an associate producer at RKO. Marcus had been a sales executive for RKO. In March 1934 Marcus graduated from being an assistant producer to producing shorts, succeeding Brock. Bert Gilroy, who would eventually become a producer in his own right, was made Marcus' assistant. For his first season in his new role, he would handle the production of eight different short series for the studio, each short consisting a "two-reeler", for a total of 42 short films. Five of the series would consist of six shorts each: Edgar Kennedy Comedies, Blondes and Redheads, Headliners, Four Star Comedies, and Chick Chandlers. The other three series would each have 4 installments: Clark and McCulloughs, Ruth Ettings, and Radio Musicals. At his first national meeting for RKO, Marcus declared his intent to increase the quality of production for short films.

=== Move to producing feature films ===
However, in addition to being the head of Radio's comedy shorts division, Marcus was given the title of associate producer for features by the end of the summer of 1934. Associate producers during this time were the supervising producers for film production at RKO, and were given on-screen credit as either an associate producer, or simply, producer. Marcus' first feature was Kentucky Kernels, starring the comedy duo of Wheeler and Woolsey, and directed by George Stevens. He would work with the comedy team again the following year, once more with Stevens at the helm, on The Nitwits. The film's original title was Mellodicks, which Marcus found repugnant. He offered $50 to any employee of RKO who could come up with a better title. While he received numerous suggestions, he finally settled on the picture's final title, which had been a generic title around the RKO lot for years. In all, Marcus produced the final six films made by duo between 1934 and 1937, the others being The Rainmakers (1935), Silly Billies (1936), Mummy's Boys (1936), and High Flyers (1937).

Marcus would continue in his dual role at the studio for the 1935–36 season, scheduled to produce 36 shorts as well as three feature films. In May 1936, RKO exercised their option on Marcus, extending his contract. He was one of eight producers featured in RKO promotional features for the studio, heralding their upcoming film schedule. One of the first films Marcus produced in the new season was the next Wheeler and Woolsey comedy, The Rainmakers, this picture directed by Fred Guiol. That season also saw Marcus produce a "tone film", Metropolitan Nocturne, wherein there was no dialogue, instead a musical composition, in this instance the symphony of the same name by Louis Alter, was interpreted on the screen using all pantomime. Shortly after it was announced that the RKO film shorts program for 1936-37 would consist of 36 films, including 12 musicals, Marcus' contract was renewed by Sam Briskin, head of the studio. Before the end of the year Marcus was promoted to Briskin's assistant, wherein he was responsible for overseeing the work of several producers' output, primarily handling the studio's B-film output. With this promotion Marcus finally relinquished his direct control over the RKO short film production. While overseeing other producers, Marcus continued to be the supervising producer on his own pictures during 1936 and 1937, such as We're on the Jury (1937), and High Flyers (1937), another Wheeler/Woolsey film. High Flyers was originally titled The Kangaroos (the name of the play on which it was based), and initially had a relatively unknown Betty Grable as the female lead. Grable was eventually replaced by Marjorie Lord in the picture, which was the final film for the duo of Wheeler and Woolsey, due to Robert Woolsey's death less than a year later. Marcus' work on the 1936 romantic comedy Love on a Bet was singled out for its production value.

At the studio's annual sales meeting in June 1937, Briskin announced that Marcus' position within the organization would remain unchanged for the upcoming 1937–38 season. Marcus was responsible for overseeing about half of the overall production for RKO. Briskin, rather than giving Marcus a budgeted amount for each picture, simply gave Marcus an overall lump sum with which he was responsible for completing all his filming assignments. This was an effort to do away with the practice of grading pictures as either "A" or "B" films. When Briskin departed RKO in the fall of 1937, Marcus retained his position, although there was some discussion of him replacing Berman. His name was on a short list, along with David O. Selznick, Mervyn LeRoy, Ben Kahane, and Jesse L. Lasky. When that didn't materialize, by the beginning of 1938 there was talk that he would split the head production activities of the studio with Pandro S. Berman, with Marcus in charge of B-films and Berman in charge of A-films. By the end of February 1938 that arrangement was made official by Leo Spitz, the new president of RKO, and in August Marcus was given a new three-year contract with the studio. In 1938 RKO created a new type of motion picture, the exploitation film, in response to potential issues from the Hays commission and the National Legion of Decency about the number of crime dramas which were being produced by the studios. One of the first was Smashing the Rackets (1938), after which Marcus suggested two other exploitation films, Clip Joint and Strip Tease. Neither had either social significance or artistic value, but were conceived solely to drive viewers through the turnstiles. While they perfectly fit the bill of what Spitz was looking for, he passed on making either film. When Berman was replaced by Harry Eddington in December 1939 as the head of A-film production, Marcus remained in charge of RKO's B product. In 1940, Marcus produced what many consider the first film noir, Stranger on the Third Floor. Marcus remained in charge of the low-budget films at RKO until February 19, 1941, when studio head George J. Schaefer assumed total control of production, demoting both Eddington and Marcus. Marcus was relegated to being simply a studio producer. Marcus lasted three months in his new position, resigning from RKO at the end of April, 1941.

=== Post RKO ===
After leaving RKO, Marcus only worked on a single film during the remainder of 1941 and all of 1942. In early 1942 he was the associate producer on The Spoilers for Universal Pictures, which starred John Wayne, Randolph Scott, and Marlene Dietrich. Later that year, in August, Marcus signed a long-term contract to produce for 20th Century Fox. His first assignment at 20th Century was supposed to be Bad Men of Texas, written by Frank Gruber, however that project does not appear to have been completed. His first completed project for Fox was Crash Dive, which he finished producing after Milton Sperling was called up to join the United States Marine Corps in September 1942. This was followed by They Came to Blow Up America, a spy thriller starring George Sanders, for which Marcus' production quality received positive reviews. In June 1943, Marcus resigned from 20th-Century, to work for Edward Small at his independent production company. The final two films he produced for Fox, The Dancing Masters, a Laurel and Hardy comedy, and Roger Touhy, Gangster, a gangster film with Preston Foster in the titular role, were not released until after his departure from the studio. His tenure with Small was short-lived, however, and he resigned in March 1944, due to an unspecified illness. At the end of 1944, he co-produced, with Bert Gilroy, a musical short for his old studio, RKO, Songs of the Colleges. In 1946 he rejoined forces with Small, this time along with Joseph Fields, in forming an independent production company. In 1946 Marcus produced a compilation film for Astor Pictures. Titled Hollywood Bound, it consisted of three film shorts featuring Betty Grable, which Marcus had produced in the 1930s. In early 1947, Marcus produced his final film, Lost Honeymoon, which was written by Fields. Starring Franchot Tone, Ann Richards, and Tom Conway, the picture was produced and released by Eagle-Lion Films.

== Filmography ==
(Per AFI database)

- Kentucky Kernels (1934)
- Lightning Strikes Twice (1934)
- The Nitwits (1935)
- The Rainmakers (1935)
- Silly Billies (1936)
- Love on a Bet (1936)
- Mummy's Boys (1936)
- Grand Jury (1936)
- Second Wife (1936)
- We're on the Jury (1937)
- On Again-Off Again (1937)
- High Flyers (1937)
- Annabel Takes a Tour (1938)
- Tarnished Angel (1938)
- The Law West of Tombstone (1938)
- Next Time I Marry (1938)
- Lawless Valley (1938)
- A Man to Remember (1938)
- The Fighting Gringo (1939)
- The Girl from Mexico (1939)
- The Rookie Cop (1939)
- Conspiracy (1939)
- They Made Her a Spy (1939)
- Twelve Crowded Hours (1939)
- Full Confession (1939)
- Pacific Liner (1939)
- Panama Lady (1939)
- Beauty for the Asking (1939)
- Five Came Back (1939)
- Career (1939)
- The Saint in London (1939)
- Sorority House (1939)
- Arizona Legion (1939)
- The Day the Bookies Wept (1939)
- Fixer Dugan (1939)
- Racketeers of the Range (1939)
- Almost a Gentleman (1939)
- The Marshal of Mesa City (1939)
- Reno (1939)
- Three Sons (1939)
- Sued for Libel (1939)
- Two Thoroughbreds (1939)
- The Saint Strikes Back (1939)
- The Girl and the Gambler (1939)
- The Spellbinder (1939)
- Timber Stampede (1939)
- Trouble in Sundown (1939)
- Mexican Spitfire Out West (1940)
- Mexican Spitfire (1940)
- Anne of Windy Poplars (1940)
- Men Against the Sky (1940)
- Stranger on the Third Floor (1940)
- The Marines Fly High (1940)
- Curtain Call (1940)
- You Can't Fool Your Wife (1940)
- Millionaires in Prison (1940)
- Cross-Country Romance (1940)
- Bullet Code (1940)
- Little Orvie (1940)
- Laddie (1940)
- I'm Still Alive (1940)
- The Fargo Kid (1940)
- Married and in Love (1940)
- Pop Always Pays (1940)
- Prairie Law (1940)
- The Saint Takes Over (1940)
- Wagon Train (1940)
- Wildcat Bus (1940)
- Millionaire Playboy (1940)
- The Saint's Double Trouble (1940)
- Legion of the Lawless (1940)
- A Bill of Divorcement (1940)
- Triple Justice (1940)
- Stage to Chino (1940)
- One Crowded Night (1940)
- Along the Rio Grande (1941)
- Father Takes a Wife (1941)
- Play Girl (1941)
- The Saint in Palm Springs (1941)
- Let's Make Music (1941)
- The Spoilers (1942)
- Crash Dive (1943)
- The Dancing Masters (1943)
- They Came to Blow Up America (1943)
- Roger Touhy, Gangster (1944)
- Hollywood Bound (1946)
- Lost Honeymoon (1947)

== Personal life ==
On October 17, 1927, Marcus married Claire S. Warner. The two were married at the restaurant, Sherry's, before leaving on their three-week honeymoon in Bermuda. Marcus died on January 30, 1969, at the age of 75.
