= Robert McWade =

American actor (1872–1938)

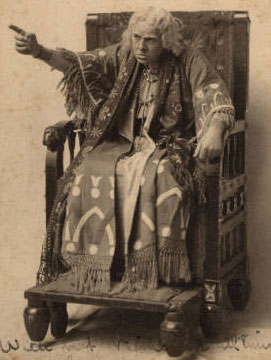
- McWade as Simonides in a 1905 stage production of Ben Hur
- Born: January 25, 1872; Buffalo, New York, U.S.
- Died: January 19, 1938 (aged 65); Culver City, California, U.S.
- Occupation: Actor
- Years active: 1902–1938
- Spouse: Minnie Lee
- Children: 2

Robert McWade (January 25, 1872 – January 19, 1938), was an American stage and film actor.

== Biography ==
McWade was born in Buffalo, New York. He was the third actor named Robert McWade, after his father and grandfather.

In 1902, McWade debuted on stage with the Murray Hill Stock Company. From 1903 to 1927, he appeared in at least 38 Broadway productions, his last being Devil In The Cheese (1926), with Bela Lugosi and Fredric March. McWade also appeared in 83 films between 1924 and 1938, for example 42nd Street with Dick Powell and Ruby Keeler (1933). His older brother was character actor Edward McWade.

McWade was married to Minne Lee, and they had two sons.

On January 19, 1938, McWade died of heart disease in Culver City, California, at age 65.

== Selected filmography ==
- Second Youth (1924) - Department Store Clerk (uncredited)
- New Brooms (1925) - Robert Bates Sr.
- The Home Towners (1928) - P. H. Bancroft
- The Sins of the Children (1930) - Joe Higginson
- Good Intentions (1930) - Cyrus Holt
- Night Work (1930) - Phil Reisman
- The Pay-Off (1930) - Frank Smiley
- Feet First (1930) - John Quincy Tanner
- Cimarron (1931) - Louis Hefner
- Kept Husbands (1931) - Arthur Parker
- It's a Wise Child (1931) - G. A. Appleby
- Too Many Cooks (1931) - Uncle George Bennett
- New Adventures of Get Rich Quick Wallingford (1931) - Mr. Tuttle
- Skyline (1931) - Judge West
- Girls About Town (1931) - Simms
- Ladies of the Jury (1932) - Judge Henry Fish
- Grand Hotel (1932) - Meierheim
- Madame Racketeer (1932) - James Butterworth
- The First Year (1932) - Fred Livingston
- Movie Crazy (1932) - Wesley Kitterman - Producer
- Back Street (1932) - Uncle Felix
- Flaming Gold (1932) - Bill Conway
- Once in a Lifetime (1932) - Mr. Walker (uncredited)
- The Phantom of Crestwood (1932) - Herbert Walcott
- I Am a Fugitive from a Chain Gang (1932) - F.E. Ramsey
- The Match King (1932) - Mr. Larsen
- Hard to Handle (1933) - Charles Reeves
- Ladies They Talk About (1933) - District Attorney Walter Simpson
- 42nd Street (1933) - Jones
- Pick-Up (1933) - Jerome Turner
- The Big Cage (1933) - Henry Cameron
- Heroes for Sale (1933) - Dr. Briggs
- Tugboat Annie (1933) - Mayor of Secoma (uncredited)
- The Solitaire Man (1933) - Mr. Arthur Peabody
- I Loved a Woman (1933) - Larkin
- The Kennel Murder Case (1933) - District Attorney Markham
- Only Yesterday (1933) - Harvey Miles
- The Prizefighter and the Lady (1933) - Adopted Son
- Fog (1933) - Alonzo Holt
- Cross Country Cruise (1934) - The Grouch
- The Countess of Monte Cristo (1934) - Hotel Manager
- Hold That Girl (1934) - McCloy
- Let's Be Ritzy (1934) - Splevin
- Thirty-Day Princess (1934) - Managing Editor
- Operator 13 (1934) - Col. Sharpe
- Midnight Alibi (1934) - Senator
- The Dragon Murder Case (1934) - Markham
- The Lemon Drop Kid (1934) - Mr. Griggsby
- No Ransom (1934) - John Winfield
- Gridiron Flash (1934) - Man Whose Home is Robbed (scenes deleted)
- The President Vanishes (1934) - Vice President Robert Molleson
- College Rhythm (1934) - Herman Whimple
- The County Chairman (1935) - Tom Craden
- Society Doctor (1935) - Harris Snowden
- Straight from the Heart (1935) - Boss Tim Reglan
- Mary Jane's Pa (1935) - John Wagner
- The Healer (1935) - Mr. Bradshaw (Joan's father)
- Here Comes the Band (1935) - Judge
- Diamond Jim (1935) - A.E. Moore
- Cappy Ricks Returns (1935) - Alden 'Cappy' Ricks
- His Night Out (1935) - Davis
- Frisco Kid (1935) - Judge Crawford
- Anything Goes (1936) - Elisha J. Whitney
- Next Time We Love (1936) - Frank Carteret
- Moonlight Murder (1936) - Police Chief Quinlan
- Early to Bed (1936) - Burgess Frisbie
- Bunker Bean (1936) - J.C. Kent
- High Tension (1936) - Willard Stone
- Old Hutch (1936) - Mr. Jolly
- 15 Maiden Lane (1936) - John Graves
- Mr. Cinderella (1936) - Mr. J.J. Gates
- We're on the Jury (1937) - Judge Henry Prime
- California Straight Ahead! (1937) - Corrigan
- The Good Old Soak (1937) - Webster Parsons
- Mountain Justice (1937) - Horace Bamber - Lawyer
- This Is My Affair (1937) - Admiral Dewey
- On Such a Night (1937) - Colonel Fentridge
- Of Human Hearts (1938) - Dr. Lupus Crumm
- Gold Is Where You Find It (1938) - Mr. Crouch (final film role)
