= Cappy Ricks Returns =

1935 film by Mack V. Wright

- Directed by: Mack V. Wright
- Screenplay by: George Waggner
- Based on: Cappy Ricks Comes Back by Peter B. Kyne
- Produced by: Trem Carr
- Starring: Robert McWade; Ray Walker; Florine McKinney; Lucien Littlefield; Bradley Page; Lois Wilson
- Cinematography: Harry Neumann
- Edited by: Carl Pierson
- Production company: Republic Pictures
- Distributed by: Republic Pictures
- Release date: September 25, 1935
- Running time: 69 minutes
- Country: United States
- Language: English

Cappy Ricks Returns is a 1935 American comedy film directed by Mack V. Wright and written by George Waggner. The film stars Robert McWade, Ray Walker, Florine McKinney, Lucien Littlefield, Bradley Page and Lois Wilson. The film was released on September 25, 1935, by Republic Pictures.

== Cast ==
- Robert McWade as Alden 'Cappy' Ricks
- Ray Walker as Bill Peck
- Florine McKinney as Barbara Blake
- Lucien Littlefield as Skinner
- Bradley Page as Spencer Winton
- Lois Wilson as Florry Peasley
- Oscar Apfel as T. Osgood Blake
- Kenneth Harlan as Matt Peasley
