= Too Many Wives =

1937 film by Ben Holmes

- Directed by: Ben Holmes
- Written by: Dorothy Yost; Lois Eby; John Grey
- Produced by: William Sistrom
- Starring: Anne Shirley; Gene Lockhart; Barbara Pepper
- Cinematography: Nicholas Musuraca
- Edited by: Desmond Marquette
- Music by: Roy Webb
- Production company: RKO Radio Pictures
- Distributed by: RKO Radio Pictures
- Release date: April 9, 1937
- Running time: 70 minutes
- Country: United States
- Language: English
- Budget: $105,000
- Box office: $122,000

Too Many Wives is a 1937 American comedy film directed by Ben Holmes and starring Anne Shirley, Gene Lockhart and Barbara Pepper. Produced and distributed by RKO Pictures, it lost $35,000.

== Plot ==
To gain a job as a newspaper reporter, desperate dog walker Barry Trent lies that he is married with children and needs the employment badly. When he begins dating Betty Jackson, his lies come back to bite him, including when her high-society suitor Clabby pays a woman named Angela a thousand dollars to lie that she is Barry's wife.

A robbery of a valuable stamp is a further complication, but Barry solves the crime (a dog has the stamp) and then races to city hall to stop Betty from marrying Clabby.

== Cast ==
- Anne Shirley as Betty
- John Morley as Barry
- Gene Lockhart as Winfield
- Barbara Pepper as Angela
- Frank Melton as Clabby
- Charles Coleman as Rogers
- Dot Farley as Mrs. Potts
- Jack Carson as Hodges
- George Irving as Justice A.K. Otto
- Arthur Aylesworth as Harper (uncredited)
- Monte Collins as Herman (uncredited)
- Eddie Gribbon as Owner of Oscar's Diner (uncredited)
- Bud Jamison as Edmund (uncredited)

Dudley Clements as Publisher and editor, Mansfield
