= Frank Jenks =

American actor (1902–1962)

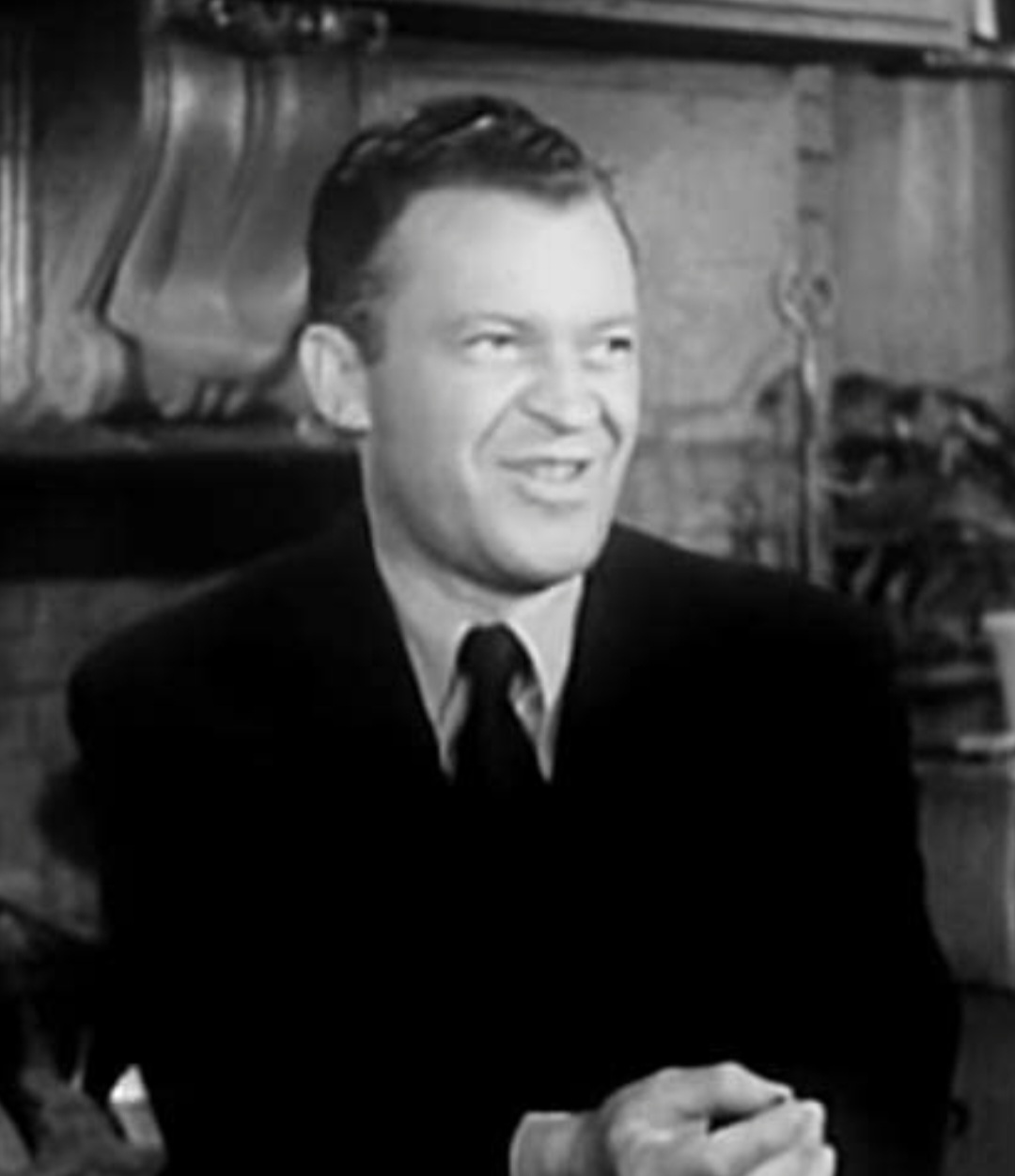
- Jenks in The Missing Corpse (1945)
- Born: November 4, 1902; Des Moines, Iowa, U.S.
- Died: May 13, 1962 (aged 59); Hollywood, California, U.S.
- Occupation: Actor
- Years active: 1933–1962

Frank Jenks (November 4, 1902 – May 13, 1962) was an American actor and vaudevillian.

== Biography ==
=== Early years ===
Jenks was born in Des Moines, Iowa, and his mother gave him a trombone when he was 9 years old. By his late teens he was playing with Eddie Peabody and his band. After two years' touring with Peabody, he resumed his education at the University of Southern California, supplementing his daytime classes with performances in Los Angeles nightclubs. Later, he became a studio musician in Hollywood, California.

=== Movie career ===
Jenks began in vaudeville and went on to a long career in movies and television, mostly in comedy. He was one of the more familiar faces and voices of the Hollywood Studio era. For almost ten years beginning in the early 1920s, he was a song and dance man in vaudeville. In 1933, when sound films had become the norm, Broadway actors moved to Hollywood in droves. Jenks' flat, sarcastic delivery landed him a film career. Usually a supporting actor, Jenks did appear occasionally as a film lead for low-budget films for PRC. Jenks appeared in a few classics. In the Cary Grant-Rosalind Russell classic His Girl Friday (1940), Jenks had his most famous role, as the cynical newsman "Wilson".

When television began, Jenks made a successful transition. His biggest success was as Uthas P. Garvey, the skeptical, proletarian right-hand man for the loquacious English con artist "Colonel Humphrey Flack" (1953-54) in the DuMont Television Network series of that name. He reprised the role in a syndicated version of Colonel Humphrey Flack that was syndicated in 1958. He portrayed Lieutenant Rodney in the DuMont series Front Page Detective (1951-52), and he was a member of the cast of The Eddie Cantor Comedy Theater, which was syndicated in 1955. He appeared in Waldo, an unsold television pilot that aired as an episode of the anthology series New Comedy Showcase in 1960.

=== Death ===
On May 13, 1962, Jenks died of esophageal cancer in Hollywood, California, at age 59.

== Selected filmography ==
- Luxury Liner (1933) - Ship's Bandleader (uncredited)
- Hello, Everybody! (1933) - Orchestra Leader (uncredited)
- College Humor (1933) - Orchestra Leader (uncredited)
- Broadway to Hollywood (1933) - Call Boy (uncredited)
- Young and Beautiful (1934) - Cheer Leader (uncredited)
- College Rhythm (1934) - Orchestra Leader (uncredited)
- Follow the Fleet (1936) - Sailor (uncredited)
- The Farmer in the Dell (1936) - Bill Crosby
- The Witness Chair (1936) - Roy Levino
- The Last Outlaw (1936) - Deputy Tom
- Women Are Trouble (1936) - Reporter (uncredited)
- Swing Time (1936) - Red - Dancer (uncredited)
- Walking on Air (1936) - First Gas Station Attendant (uncredited)
- Don't Turn 'Em Loose (1936) - Pete - Henchman
- Old Hutch (1936) - Crook #2 (uncredited)
- The Big Broadcast of 1937 (1936) - Trombone Player
- Smartest Girl in Town (1936) - Mr. Murphy - Photographer (uncredited)
- That Girl from Paris (1936) - Laughing Boy Frank
- The Charge of the Light Brigade (1936)
- We Who Are About to Die (1937) - Clyde Beasley
- When's Your Birthday? (1937) - Lefty
- There Goes My Girl (1937) - Reporter Frank 'George' Tate
- Angel's Holiday (1937) - Butch Broder
- One Hundred Men and a Girl (1937) - Taxi Driver
- The Lady Fights Back (1937) - Steve (scenes deleted)
- Saturday's Heroes (1937) - Dubrowsky
- The Westland Case (1937) - Doc Williams
- Prescription for Romance (1937) - Smitty
- You're a Sweetheart (1937) - Harry Howe
- Love Is a Headache (1938) - Joe Cannon
- Reckless Living (1938) - Freddie
- Goodbye Broadway (1938) - Harry Clark
- The Lady in the Morgue (1938) - Doc Williams
- The Devil's Party (1938) - Sam
- Letter of Introduction (1938) - Joe - Theater Prompter
- Youth Takes a Fling (1938) - Frank Munson
- The Storm (1938) - Peter Carey - Wireless Operator
- Strange Faces (1938) - Nick Denby
- The Last Warning (1938) - Doc Williams
- You Can't Cheat an Honest Man (1939) - Jerry - Assistant (uncredited)
- Society Smugglers (1939) - Emery
- Big Town Czar (1939) - Sid Travers
- S.O.S. Tidal Wave (1939) - Peaches Jackson
- The Under-Pup (1939) - Uncle Dan
- Golden Boy (1939) - Pepper White (uncredited)
- First Love (1939) - Mike the Cop
- His Girl Friday (1940) - Wilson
- Three Cheers for the Irish (1940) - Ed McKean
- A Little Bit of Heaven (1940) - Uncle Dan
- Melody and Moonlight (1940) - Butch Reilly
- Dancing on a Dime (1940) - Phil Miller
- Tall, Dark and Handsome (1941) - Puffy
- Back Street (1941) - Harry Niles
- The Flame of New Orleans (1941) - 2nd Sailor
- Scattergood Meets Broadway (1941) - J. J. Bent
- Two Yanks in Trinidad (1942) - Joe Scavenger
- Syncopation (1942) - Smiley Jackson
- Maisie Gets Her Man (1942) - Art Giffman
- The Navy Comes Through (1942) - Sampier
- Seven Miles from Alcatraz (1942) - Jimbo
- The Human Comedy (1943) - Larry - Song Leader on Train (uncredited)
- Corregidor (1943) - Sgt. Mahoney
- Shantytown (1943) - 'Whitey'
- Gildersleeve's Bad Day (1943) - Al
- So's Your Uncle (1943) - Joe Elliott
- Thousands Cheer (1943) - Sgt. Koslack
- Hi'ya, Sailor (1943) - Deadpan Weaver
- His Butler's Sister (1943) - Emmett
- Ladies Courageous (1944) - Snapper
- Rosie the Riveter (1944) - Kelly Kennedy
- Shake Hands with Murder (1944) - Eddie Jones
- Follow the Boys (1944) - Chick Doyle (uncredited)
- Two Girls and a Sailor (1944) - Dick Deyo (uncredited)
- This Is the Life (1944) - Eddie
- Roger Touhy, Gangster (1944) - Bernard 'Troubles' O'Connor
- Take It or Leave It (1944) - Taxi Driver (uncredited)
- Three Little Sisters (1944) - Pvt. 'Rosy' Rowman
- Dixie Jamboree (1944) - Jack 'Curly' Berger
- The Impatient Years (1944) - Top Sergeant (uncredited)
- Strange Affair (1944) - Sgt. Erwin
- Rogues' Gallery (1944) - Eddie Porter
- The Falcon in Hollywood (1944) - Lieutenant Higgins
- The Kid Sister (1945) - Burglar
- G.I. Honeymoon (1945) - Horace P. 'Blubber' Malloy
- Zombies on Broadway (1945) - Gus
- The Phantom of 42nd Street (1945) - Egbert Egelhofer, aka Romeo (Taxicab Driver)
- The Missing Corpse (1945) - Mack Hogan
- Bedside Manner (1945) - Pvt. Harry Smith
- Steppin' in Society (1945) - George
- Christmas in Connecticut (1945) - Sinkewicz
- One Way to Love (1946) - Jensen
- The Hoodlum Saint (1946) - Dance Contest M.C. (uncredited)
- Blondie's Lucky Day (1946) - Mailman
- White Tie and Tails (1946) - George
- That Brennan Girl (1946) - Joe the Cabbie
- Philo Vance's Gamble (1947) - Ernie Clark
- That's My Gal (1947) - Louie Koblentz
- Kilroy Was Here (1947) - Butch Miller
- Philo Vance's Secret Mission (1947) - Ernie Clark
- Blonde Savage (1947) - Hoppy Owens
- High Wall (1947) - Pinky (uncredited)
- Mary Lou (1948) - Mike Connors
- Mr. Reckless (1948) - Cab Driver
- Blondie's Reward (1948) - Ed Vance
- Joe Palooka in Winner Take All (1948) - Louie
- You Gotta Stay Happy (1948) - Carnival Man
- Shep Comes Home (1948) - The Iceman
- Family Honeymoon (1948) - Gas Station Attendant
- Prison Warden (1949) - Postman (uncredited)
- Mother Didn't Tell Me (1950) - Furniture Mover (uncredited)
- Blondie's Hero (1950) - Tim Saunders
- Motor Patrol (1950) - Mac
- Lucky Losers (1950) - Bartender
- The Petty Girl (1950) - Kaye - Producer #2 (uncredited)
- Woman on the Run (1950) - Detective Shaw
- To Please a Lady (1950) - Press Agent
- Joe Palooka in the Squared Circle (1950) - Looie - a Trainer
- Bowery Battalion (1951) - Recruiting Sergeant
- Silver City Bonanza (1951) - Theater Owner
- The Scarf (1951) - Tom (uncredited)
- I Was an American Spy (1951) - Radio Operator 'Mac' Marconi (uncredited)
- Father Takes the Air (1951) - Customer (uncredited)
- Let's Go Navy! (1951) - Shell game sailor
- Utah Wagon Train (1951) - Hap - Telephone Company Lineman
- Pecos River (1951) - Sheriff Denning
- Mr. Walkie Talkie (1952) - Corporal Jackson
- The Adventures of Superman (1952) - Candy
- White Lightning (1953) - Benny Brown
- Highway Dragnet (1954) - Marine in Civvies
- Outlaw Treasure (1955) - Sergeant
- Not as a Stranger (1955) - Mr. Parrish (uncredited)
- Tennessee's Partner (1955) - Bartender (uncredited)
- Artists and Models (1955) - Piano-Mover (uncredited)
- Sudden Danger (1955) - Kenny - Bartender
- Dig That Uranium (1955) - Olaf the Mechanic (uncredited)
- Slightly Scarlet (1956) - Bartender (uncredited)
- The Houston Story (1956) - Louie Phelan
- The She-Creature (1956) - Plainclothes Sgt. with Lt. James
- Friendly Persuasion (1956) - Shell Game Man (uncredited)
- Shake, Rattle & Rock! (1956) - Frank
- The Amazing Colossal Man (1957) - Truck Driver
- Merry Andrew (1958) - Bertie (uncredited)
- Rock-A-Bye Baby (1958) - Reporter (uncredited)
