= There Goes My Girl =

1937 film by Edward Killy, Ben Holmes

- Theatrical release poster
- Directed by: Ben Holmes
- Screenplay by: Harry Segall
- Story by: George Back
- Produced by: William Sistrom
- Starring: Gene Raymond; Ann Sothern; Gordon Jones; Richard Lane; Frank Jenks; Bradley Page
- Cinematography: Joseph H. August
- Edited by: Desmond Marquette
- Production company: RKO Pictures
- Distributed by: RKO Pictures
- Release date: May 21, 1937
- Running time: 74 minutes
- Country: United States
- Language: English

There Goes My Girl is a 1937 American comedy film directed by Ben Holmes, written by Harry Segall, and starring Gene Raymond, Ann Sothern, Gordon Jones, Richard Lane, Frank Jenks and Bradley Page. It was released on May 21, 1937, by RKO Pictures.

== Plot ==
When Jerry Martin and Connie Taylor, reporters for rival newspapers, fall in love, Taylor's Editor Tim Whelan sets up a fake murder to disrupt their wedding. Taylor insists on investigating the story, which causes a break-up with her fiancee. When the two reporters end up covering a real murder, Taylor attempts to reconcile her relationship, while Whelan attempts to break them up again.

== Cast ==
- Gene Raymond as Reporter Jerry Martin
- Ann Sothern as Reporter Connie Taylor
- Gordon Jones as Reporter Dunn
- Richard Lane as Editor Tim J. Whelan
- Frank Jenks as Reporter Frank 'George' Tate
- Bradley Page as Joe Rethburn
- Joan Woodbury as Margot Whitney
- Marla Shelton as Mrs. Grace Andrews
- Alec Craig as 'Godfrey'
- Joseph Crehan as Sgt. Wood
- William Corson as Dan Curtis
- Maxine Jennings as Miss Caldwell
- Clyde Dilson as Actor Shot at Wedding
- Charles Coleman as Faraday
- Chester Clute as Stu Parker
- Roy James as Joe
- Harry Worth as Henry
