= Don't Turn 'Em Loose =

1936 film directed by Ben Stoloff

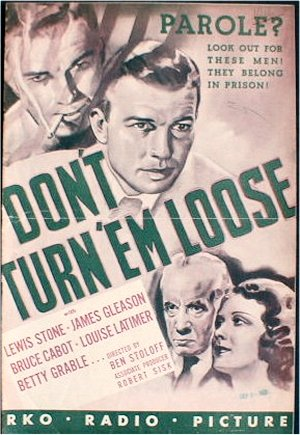
- Theatrical poster
- Directed by: Ben Stoloff; Ivan Thomas (assistant)
- Screenplay by: Harry Segall; Ferdinand Reyher
- Based on: "Homecoming" story in 1936 Collier's by Thomas Walsh
- Produced by: Samuel J. Briskin; Robert Sisk
- Starring: Lewis Stone; James Gleason; Bruce Cabot; Louise Latimer; Betty Grable
- Cinematography: Jack MacKenzie
- Edited by: William M. Morgan
- Production company: RKO Radio Pictures
- Release date: September 18, 1936 (US)
- Running time: 65-68 minutes
- Country: United States
- Language: English

Don't Turn 'Em Loose is a 1936 American crime drama film directed by Ben Stoloff and produced by RKO Radio Pictures, who released the film on September 18, 1936. Written by Harry Segall and Ferdinand Reyher, the production's screenplay is at least partially based on "Homecoming" by Thomas Walsh, a short story published in Collier's magazine in March 1936. The film costars Lewis Stone, James Gleason, Bruce Cabot, Louise Latimer and Betty Grable.

== Plot ==
Bob Webster, aka Bat Williams, is a career criminal who keeps his parents and siblings in the dark about his chosen career by pretending to be an engineer who is often away in different parts of the world on assignments. He uses this ploy not only to disguise when he is out of town engaged in criminal activities, but also to cover the times he has been sentenced to prison. After receiving a parole from prison, he rejoins his gang, including his gangster girlfriend, Grace Forbes in robbing a creamery. A robbery during which they kill a clerk who can identify them.

After the robbery, Williams leaves the gang and returns to his family's home in upstate New York. His father, John, his mother, Helen, and his sister, Mildred, all think the world of Williams. During his stints in prison, he sends one of the other gang members to different far-away locales, in order to mail a post card to his family, pretending that he is working there on an engineering job. During his visit, he overhears his father on the phone with the Governor, who is asking John to serve on the state parole board. Fearing discovery, Williams tries to convince his father not to serve on the board, but John won't commit one way or the other. While in his home town of Barlow, he also runs into his old girlfriend, Letty Graves. To impress Letty, Williams breaks into a jewelry store and steals a bracelet, but kills the security guard so that he can't identify him.

Meanwhile, Detective Daniels has been pursuing Williams and his gang. He catches up to Grace, who is having an affair behind Williams' back with another gang member, Al. Daniels threatens Grace with exposing the affair to Williams, if she doesn't help lure Williams into a trap. In order to save herself, she double-crosses Williams, and Daniels is able to arrest him and send him back to prison. Knowing that it was Grace who gave him up, Williams secretly escapes from prison and tracks her down, killing her. He then returns to prison by hitching a ride on a truck, before anyone notices that he is gone. Again to prevent identification, he plants a bomb in the truck, which explodes after dropping him off near the prison, killing the driver.

When it is time for his parole hearing, he is surprised to find out his father is sitting on the board. John is also surprised that the hardened criminal, Bat Williams, and his son Bob are one and the same. John is leaning to voting not to parole, but Williams threatens him with letting the scandal about him becoming public knowledge. This would ruin Mildred's upcoming wedding. John relents and votes for parole, but not until he gets Williams word that he will leave the country once released. Instead of fleeing the country, he returns to Barlow, where he plans on robbing the payroll of Lettie's father's company. However, Detective Daniels follows Williams to the company at night, where he interrupts Williams in the process of the robbery. Williams turns the tables on Daniels and is about to shoot him, when John shows up. He had suspected his son might be up to something and had also followed him that night. To prevent his son from shooting Daniels, he is forced to shoot Williams himself. Daniels takes Williams away, so John won't have to see his son die. John keeps the secret of Bob's life and death hidden from the rest of the family.

== Cast ==
- Lewis Stone as John Webster
- James Gleason as Daniels
- Bruce Cabot as Bat Williams, alias of Bob Webster
- Louise Latimer as Letty Graves
- Betty Grable as Mildred Webster
- Grace Bradley as Grace Forbes
- Nella Walker as Helen Webster
- Frank M. Thomas as Attorney Pierce
- Harry Jans as Vic
- John Arledge as Walter
- Frank Jenks as Pete
- Maxine Jennings as Nellie
- Gordon Jones as Joe
- Addison Randall as Al - Henchman

(cast list as per AFI database)

== Production ==
In April 1936 it was announced that Don't Turn 'Em Loose was scheduled to begin production on May 15, with Robert Sisk as the supervising producer. That same month RKO announced that it had assigned Ben Stoloff to direct, based on the original story by Ferdinand Reyher. Production was delayed, and filming eventually began on June 15. Several of the cast were made known in the first week of July, after production had already begun. Bruce Cabot was given the lead role of Bob Webster, while Lewis Stone was loaned by MGM for the other lead, that of his father, John Webster. At the same time, Harry Jans and Maxine Jennings were also announced as part of the cast, as well as Arthur Hoyt and Fern Emmett, although the American Film Institute did not confirm the latter two actually appeared in the film. However, Hoyt and Emmett do appear in cast lists from contemporaneous sources such as Photoplay and Variety. On July 15, Grace Bradley's involvement in the film was revealed. On the same day, it was also announced that John Arledge had been added to the cast, and in the same announcement it was also learned that James Gleason, Betty Grable, Louise Latimer, and Gordon Jones were also members of the production. The Film Daily announced on July 29 that Carol Nye, who was an editor for the Los Angeles Times, covering the radio industry, would be appearing in the film in a small role, although he does not appear in AFI's cast list. The film was in production during June and July 1936. It was originally scheduled for release on September 25, but was released a week earlier, on September 18. Its release in Ohio was held up due to the Ohio Board of Censors. Initially, the film underwent significant edits, where every murder scene was excised from the picture. However, by the end of September, a court ordered the removed segments returned to film, and after some slight edits, it was released in Ohio in early October. The National Legion of Decency did not approve the film for general audiences, instead approving it only for adults, categorizing it "A-2".

== Reception ==
Harrison's Reports gave the film a positive review, enjoying the constant suspense and drama, which was unrelieved by any comedy. They called Don't Turn 'Em Loose a "forceful melodrama," and said it was a powerful commentary serving "...as an indictment against the inadequate parole system that now exists [then existed]." The Film Daily also enjoyed the suspense, adding that the picture was also full of action. The said it was full of surprises and called it a "strong gangster picture." The Motion Picture Herald enjoyed the performances of the cast, calling Cabot's portrayal "outstanding," and also singling out James Gleason and Lewis Stone.
