= California Straight Ahead! =

1937 film by Arthur Lubin

- Directed by: Arthur Lubin
- Written by: Herman Boxer; Scott Darling
- Produced by: Trem Carr
- Starring: John Wayne
- Cinematography: Harry Neumann
- Edited by: Charles Craft; Erma Horsley
- Production company: Universal Pictures
- Distributed by: Universal Pictures
- Release date: April 16, 1937 (United States)
- Running time: 67 minutes
- Country: United States
- Language: English

California Straight Ahead! is a 1937 American action film about truck drivers starring John Wayne and directed by Arthur Lubin for Universal Pictures. The action movie features a memorable cross-country race between a caravan of trucks and a special train.

== Plot ==
A trucker named Biff Smith (Wayne) wins a contest between his caravan of trucks and a special train, the two competing against each other in a race to see who can deliver a load of aviation parts to an ocean liner before a labor strike takes place.

== Cast ==
- John Wayne as Biff Smith
- Louise Latimer as Mary Porter
- Robert McWade as "Corrigan"
- Theodore von Eltz as James Gifford
- Tully Marshall as "Harrison"
- Emerson Treacy as Charlie Porter
- Harry Allen as "Fish" McCorkle
- LeRoy Mason as "Padula"
- Grace Goodall as Mrs. Porter
- Olaf Hytten as "Huggins"
- Monte Vandergrift as "Clancy"
- Lorin Raker as a Secretary

== Production ==
The film was known as Short Haul. John Wayne was meant to have made a film Maid of Orleans or Adventure's End but that was delayed due to the maritime strike. Universal then put him in Short Haul which was to have begun filming in November 1936. However filming on that was delayed due to a teamsters strike. It was to have been shot in San Francisco but that city had labor troubles so the script was rewritten so it could be shot in Los Angeles. Filming eventually took place in January 1937.

The movie was the first in a series of films directed by Arthur Lubin starring John Wayne.

Lubin recalled, "We had six days to shoot. There was no time schedule, as there is today, where if you go late at night or start early in the morning, you have to pay more. In those days, you could shoot twenty-four hours a day."

== Reception ==
The Los Angeles Times called it a "fair supporting feature".

== See also ==
- List of American films of 1937
- John Wayne filmography
