= Louise Latimer (actress) =

American actress

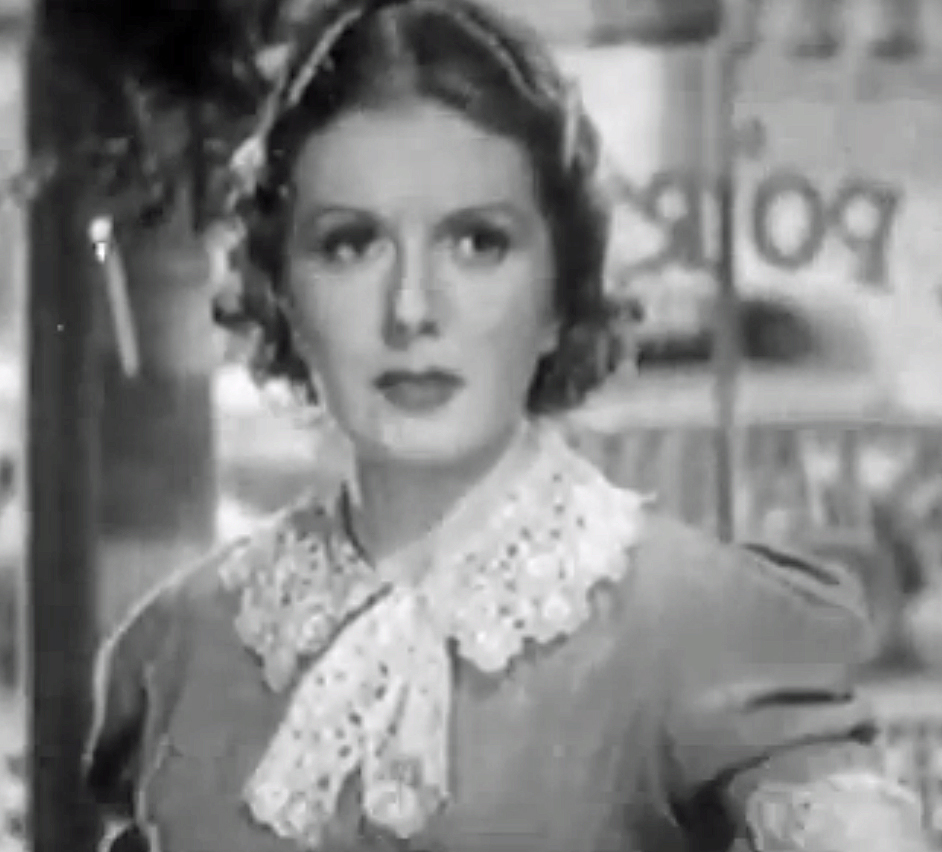
- Louise Latimer in trailer to California Straight Ahead! (1937)
- Born: March 6, 1913
- Died: June 16, 1973 (aged 60)
- Occupation: Actress
- Years active: 1934–1937
- Spouse: Erwin Gelsey (m. 1936)

Louise Latimer (March 6, 1913 – June 16, 1973) was an American film actress. She starred opposite John Wayne in the 1937 California Straight Ahead!.

On Broadway, Latimer portrayed Jean in The Scene of the Crime (1940) and Lydia in When in Rome (1934). She arrived in California on December 19, 1935, to begin working in films. She studied with drama coach Lela E. Rogers.

During World War II, she was active with the American Red Cross and various Catholic charities, helping to promote the war effort.

== Personal life ==
Latimer married scenario writer Erwin Gelsey on June 13, 1936, in Denver, Colorado.

== Selected filmography ==
- There's Always Tomorrow (1934)
- Don't Turn 'Em Loose (1936)
- Grand Jury (1936)
- Two in Revolt (1936)
- Murder on a Bridle Path (1936)
- The Witness Chair (1936)
- Bunker Bean (1936)
- The Plot Thickens (1936)
- We're on the Jury (1937)
- California Straight Ahead! (1937)
- Wings Over Honolulu (1937)
