= Grand Jury (film) =

1936 film by Albert S. Rogell

- Lobby card
- Directed by: Albert S. Rogell
- Screenplay by: Joseph A. Fields; Philip G. Epstein
- Story by: James Edward Grant; Thomas Lennon
- Produced by: Lee Marcus
- Starring: Fred Stone; Louise Latimer; Owen Davis, Jr.
- Cinematography: Joseph August
- Edited by: Jack Hively
- Music by: Alberto Colombo
- Production company: RKO Radio Pictures
- Release dates: July 31, 1936 (New York City); August 7, 1936 (United States)
- Running time: 61 minutes
- Country: United States
- Language: English

Grand Jury is a 1936 American crime drama film directed by Albert S. Rogell from a screenplay by Joseph A. Fields and Philip G. Epstein, based on a story by James Edward Grant and Thomas Lennon. Produced and distributed by RKO Radio Pictures, it premiered in New York City on July 31, 1936, and was released nationwide the following week on August 7. The film stars Fred Stone, Louise Latimer and Owen Davis, Jr.

== Plot ==
George Taylor is one of the scions of town. When his son, John Taylor, is called to sit on the town's grand jury, the younger Taylor laments the necessity of the duty. His father quickly upbraids him for his lack of civic responsibility. The trial he is to serve on the grand jury for is to determine whether a local racketeer, Joseph Britt, should be tried for the murder of a young man. Fearful of vengeance by Britt, the grand jury refuses to indict. As he leaves the courtroom, Britt is shot and wounded by Tom Evans, the father of the murder victim. Evans is also a friend of George Taylor. A young cub reporter, Steve O'Connell, is filling in for a more senior reporter, scores the story, ingratiating himself to his boss. O'Connell is engaged to Edith Taylor, George's granddaughter.

Using his connections, George Taylor gets O'Connell into see Evans, where he learns that Evans has evidence which will incriminate Britt, as well as several prominent local businessmen. When the story hits the papers, one of those prominent citizens, Jim Hanify, concocts a plot to have Evans released from jail, so that the gang can kill him. George Taylor is drafted to lead the cause to have Evans paroled, not knowing the true motives of Hanify. As he and O'Connell walk Evans out of the jail, Evans is gunned down by the mobsters. When O'Connell is scooped by other reporters, in spite of him being an eyewitness to the murder, he is fired by his boss.

When the elder Taylor decides to track down the killers, he receives a threatening phone call from Britt, after which John Taylor hires a bodyguard to protect his father. George eludes the bodyguard, and blunders onto the hideout of the gang. While he is eavesdropping on the gangsters, he mistakenly believes their conversation as they are playing Monopoly to be a real conversation about their criminal activities. Eventually he is discovered and captured by the mobsters. When O'Connell shows up to rescue him, he is also captured. However, just before they are about to be shot by Britt, the police arrive to rescue the two. George Stone is acclaimed as a local hero, and O'Connell redeems himself in the eyes of his editor, who rehires him with a promotion and raise, which will allow him to afford to marry Edith.

== Cast ==
- Fred Stone as Commodore George Taylor
- Louise Latimer as Edith Taylor
- Owen Davis, Jr. as Steve O'Connell
- Moroni Olsen as Davis
- Guinn Williams as Joseph Britt
- Frank M. Thomas as John Taylor
- Harry Beresford as Tom Evans
- Harry Jans as "Sully" Sullivan
- Russell Hicks as Jim Hanify
- Charles Wilson as Clark
- Billy Gilbert as Otto
- Ed. Gargan as Officer Tim Burke
- Robert Emmett Keane as Walters (uncredited)
- Robert Middlemass as Chief Brady
- Margaret Armstrong as Martha
- Robert Fiske as District Attorney
- Billy Arnold as Barnes
- Harvey Clark as Whalen
- Thomas E. Jackson as Stroble

(Cast list as per AFI Film Database)

== Production ==
Rogell (seated), consults with (from left to right standing) Latimer, Stone, and Davis

Thomas Lennon completed the story upon which the screenplay was based in February, 1936, at which point RKO announced that the film would be produced by Lee Marcus. Later that month, it was announced that James Edward Grant had been assigned to assist in adapting the story for the screen, and that Charles Vidor had been selected to direct the picture. Production was originally scheduled to begin on May 15, but was later delayed until the middle of June. In early May it was announced that Vidor had been replaced by Albert Rogell as director on the project.

In early June, RKO announced that Louise Latimer would be starring in the film. Lattimer's small figure was remarked upon by papers of the day. On June 13 it was reported that the movie was one of 12 in production by RKO. And the film was definitely in production by June 22. By the end of June, Robert Emmett Keane was added to the cast. In addition to Latimer, Fred Stone and Owen Davis, Jr. had already been slated to star in the film. At that time George Lloyd, Mattie Fain, and Harry Bowen were also announced as members of the cast, although they did not appear in the final version of the film.

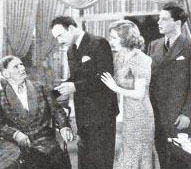
Shot film, showing (from l. to r.) Stone, Thomas, Latimer, and Davis

In the first week of July, several other actors were added to the cast. They were Frank M. Thomas, Harry Jans, "Big Boy" Williams, Russell Hicks, Moroni Olsen, Thomas E. Jackson, Harvey Clark, William Bailey, Robert Fiske, and Billy Arnold. Other actors added to the cast in early July were Edward Gargan, Sid Jarvis, J.C. Fowler, Jack Gardner, Robert Middlemass, and Henry Roquemore. The movie was still shooting into July. The film had its premiere in New York City at the RKO Palace on July 31, 1936, with its official widespread opening the following week, on August 7. In August the National Legion of Decency gave the film an A-1 rating, meaning it was classified as unobjectionable for general audiences.

== Reception ==
The Film Daily gave the film a positive review, calling it "wholesome entertainment for the whole family, combining human interest, comedy and romance." They complimented Rogell's direction, especially the pacing of the action sequences, and they also enjoyed the story and screenplay. While Harrison's Reports gave it a more lukewarm, yet still positive review, rating it "fair", and stating the it was "... amusing, and at times fairly exciting." Photoplay was even less kind, calling the picture a "... not very interesting small town drama."
