= Good Intentions (1930 film) =

1930 film

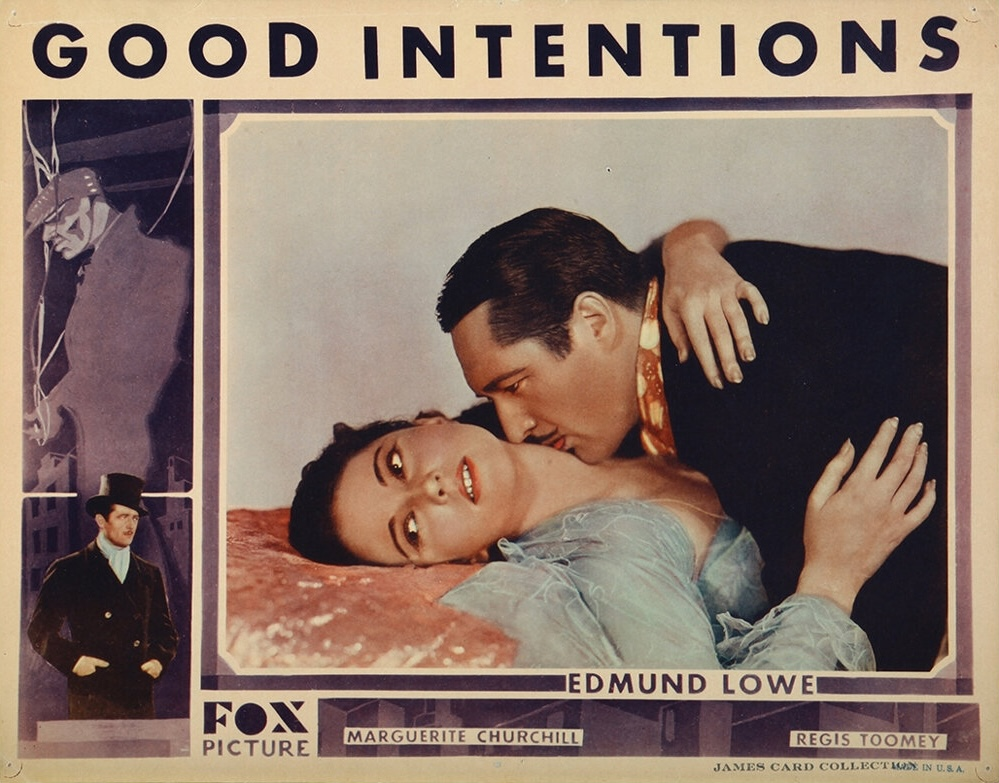
- Directed by: William K. Howard
- Screenplay by: George Manker Watters
- Story by: William K. Howard
- Starring: Edmund Lowe; Marguerite Churchill; Regis Toomey; Earle Foxe; Eddie Gribbon; Robert McWade
- Cinematography: George Schneiderman
- Edited by: Jack Murray
- Production company: Fox Film Corporation
- Distributed by: Fox Film Corporation
- Release date: June 29, 1930
- Running time: 69 minutes
- Country: United States
- Language: English

Good Intentions is a 1930 American pre-Code crime film directed by William K. Howard and written by George Manker Watters. The film stars Edmund Lowe, Marguerite Churchill, Regis Toomey, Earle Foxe, Eddie Gribbon and Robert McWade. The film was released on June 29, 1930, by Fox Film Corporation.

== Cast ==
- Edmund Lowe as David Cressonn
- Marguerite Churchill as Helen Rankin
- Regis Toomey as Richard Holt
- Earle Foxe as 'Flash' Norton
- Eddie Gribbon as Liberty Red
- Robert McWade as Cyrus Holt
- Georgia Caine as Miss Huntington
- Owen Davis Jr. as Bud Finney
- Pat Somerset as Babe Gray
- J. Carrol Naish as Charlie Hattrick
- Henry Kolker as Butler
