= Special Investigator (film) =

1936 film by Louis King

- theatrical release poster
- Directed by: Louis King
- Screenplay by: Louis Stevens; Thomas Lennon; Ferdinand Reyher
- Based on: Fugitive Gold; 1935 story in Herald Tribune's This Week Magazine by Erle Stanley Gardner
- Produced by: Samuel J. Briskin
- Starring: Richard Dix; Margaret Callahan; Erik Rhodes
- Cinematography: Edward Cronjager
- Edited by: George Hively
- Music by: Roy Webb
- Production company: RKO Radio Pictures
- Release dates: April 26, 1936 (Premier-NYC); May 8, 1936 (US)
- Running time: 61 minutes
- Country: United States
- Language: English

Special Investigator is a 1936 RKO Radio Pictures American crime-drama film, starring Richard Dix and featuring Margaret Callahan, Erik Rhodes and Owen Davis, Jr. It was directed by Louis King from a screenplay by Louis Stevens, Thomas Lennon and Ferdinand Reyher, based on "Fugitive Gold", a story by Erle Stanley Gardner originally serialized in the New York Herald Tribune's This Week magazine from May 26–July 7, 1935.

== Plot ==
Bill Fenwick (Richard Dix) is a criminal defense attorney who's near the top of his career, wealthy from defending gangsters and getting them off. Visited by his brother George (Owen Davis, Jr.), an agent for the Justice Department, he appears outwardly indifferent to his brother's chastisements for gaining success and notoriety by being on the wrong side of the law. Beneath it, though, he is troubled, and immediately splits up with his amoral gold-digging trophy girlfriend Judy (Sheila Terry) .

When he learns from Inspector Perkett (Russell Hicks) that his brother was killed during an attempted mob rub-out of a witness who could tie a half a million in stolen gold bullion to notorious racketeer Edward J. Selton (J. Carroll Naish), he quits his practice to find the man who ordered the hit. On a tip from Bennie Grey (Erik Rhodes), a former client who's already taken up with Judy, Bill goes undercover and opens a law office in Quartzburg, Nevada under the name of "Richard Galt", to investigate the sudden gold strike at the formerly closed mine at the Gold Bar Ranch. He suspects it may be a front for camouflaging the half a million in stolen bullion in with newly mined unproductive ore, a known mob gambit.

In Quartzburg, Selton's sister Virginia (Margaret Callahan) arrives to take care of her brother, who was wounded in the shootout that killed George, but the rest of the gang is suspicious of her. Meanwhile, Bill is visited by a Justice Department agent who tells him that they need to confirm that Selton is at the ranch before they can raid it. Bill contrives to meet Virginia when she stops for gas and, unaware that she is the Selton's sister but knowing that she's connected in some way to the mine, follows her to Reno, where she picks up a shady doctor, Vic Reynolds (Jed Prouty), at the airport. While they are there, Bill drains the gas from her car to force her to stop on the drive back. When it does, he offers the pair a ride. At the ranch, while the doctor tends to Selton, Bill seeks to make an impression on tough top-kick Jim Plummer (Joe Sawyer) playing high-stakes poker with he and the other members of Selton's gang.

Bill returns to the ranch over the next few days, both to see Virginia and gather information. Plummer is suspicious of the supposed small-town lawyer, and has an argument with Selton about what to do about him; he is ordered to do nothing, as it will only draw attraction to their operation if Plummer is right. Nevertheless, one of the gang, Dutch (Ray Mayer), tries to kill Bill while he and Virginia are riding horses, shooting her horse out from under her and injuring her in the fall. The feverish Selton orders Plummer to deck Dutch, to show them all that he's still the boss.

Learning that the government is planning a raid at midnight, Bill takes Virginia dancing in Reno to keep her out of harm's way, but two suspicious members of the gang follow them there. When Bill's former girlfriend Judy and former client Bennie Grey run into Bill and Virginia they greet him as Bill Fenwick. He pretends not to know them, but the couple sees through it; later the two hoods force them at gunpoint to reveal his identity.

When Bill and Virginia get back to Quartzburg, Bill locks Virginia up in a garage for her safety, but without explaining why. Sensing something is up that will threaten both Bill and her brother, Virginia smashes through the door with her car and heads back to the ranch. Bill learns from Judy that the gang knows his real identity, and joins up with the Justice Department agents heading out to raid the ranch.

When Plummer hears the news about Bill he makes his move to take over the gang. They tie up Selton, pirate the gold and plan to flee the ranch, taking Virginia hostage as a shield. Selton gets loose and confronts Virginia and Plummer. Believing his sister double-crossed him, he calls them all "rats". He then learns the truth, and that she is actually in love with Bill. Selton tells her to beat it, to flee to safety. As the Feds arrive, Selton dares Plummer to shoot it out with him, and begins firing. A wild melee ensues. When the gang tries to escape, they are gunned down by the authorities.

Bill goes into the ranch house, looking for Virginia, and Selton holds a gun on him. He offers to give himself up to Bill, if Bill will represent him and get him off without the death penalty. Bill turns down the offer, reminding Selton that he killed his brother. Selton then dies from his wounds, leaving Bill and Virginia free to be together.

== Cast ==
- Richard Dix as Bill Fenwick, also known as Richard Galt
- Margaret Callahan as Virginia Selton
- Erik Rhodes as Benny Gray
- Owen Davis Jr. as George Fenwick
- Ray Mayer as Dutch
- Harry Jans as Cy Adams
- Joe Sawyer as Jim Plummer
- J. Carrol Naish as Edward J. Selton
- Sheila Terry as Judy Taylor
- J. M. Kerrigan as Judge Plumgate
- Jed Prouty as Dr. Vic Reynolds
- Russell Hicks as Inspector Perkett
- Si Jenks as Hiram Simpson
- Ethan Laidlaw as Larring

== Production ==
Principal filming for Special Investigator (working title "Fugitive Gold") took place in February and March 1936. The studio had originally announced Preston Foster and Lucille Ball in the lead roles, but a change in the studio administration led to Dix being given the part. Several actors announced in the trade papers at the time as appearing in the film are not credited and their presence in the film has not been confirmed: Baby Marie Osborne, a former child star and stand-in for Ginger Rogers; Boothe Howard; and Frank M. Thomas.

Director Louis King – the younger brother of Henry King, who would direct Song of Bernadette (1939) and Twelve O'Clock High (1946) – generally specialized in Westerns.

== Box office ==
Special Investigator made a profit of $91,000.

== External list ==
- Special Investigator at IMDb
- Special Investigator at AllMovie
- Special Investigator at the TCM Movie Database (archived version)
- Special Investigator at the AFI Catalog of Feature Films
