= Ben Holmes (director) =

American film director (1890–1943)

- Born: November 6, 1890; Richmond, Virginia, U.S.
- Died: December 2, 1943 (aged 53); Hollywood, California, U.S.
- Occupations: Film director Screenwriter
- Years active: 1928-1943

Ben Holmes (November 6, 1890 – December 2, 1943) was an American film director and screenwriter. He directed 56 films and wrote for 35.

== Selected filmography ==
- So This Is Harris! (1933)
- Too Many Wives (1937); directed
- There Goes My Girl (1937); directed
- The Saint in New York (1938); directed
- Maid's Night Out (1938); directed
- The Saint's Double Trouble (1940)
