= Irving Pichel =

American actor and film director (1891–1954)

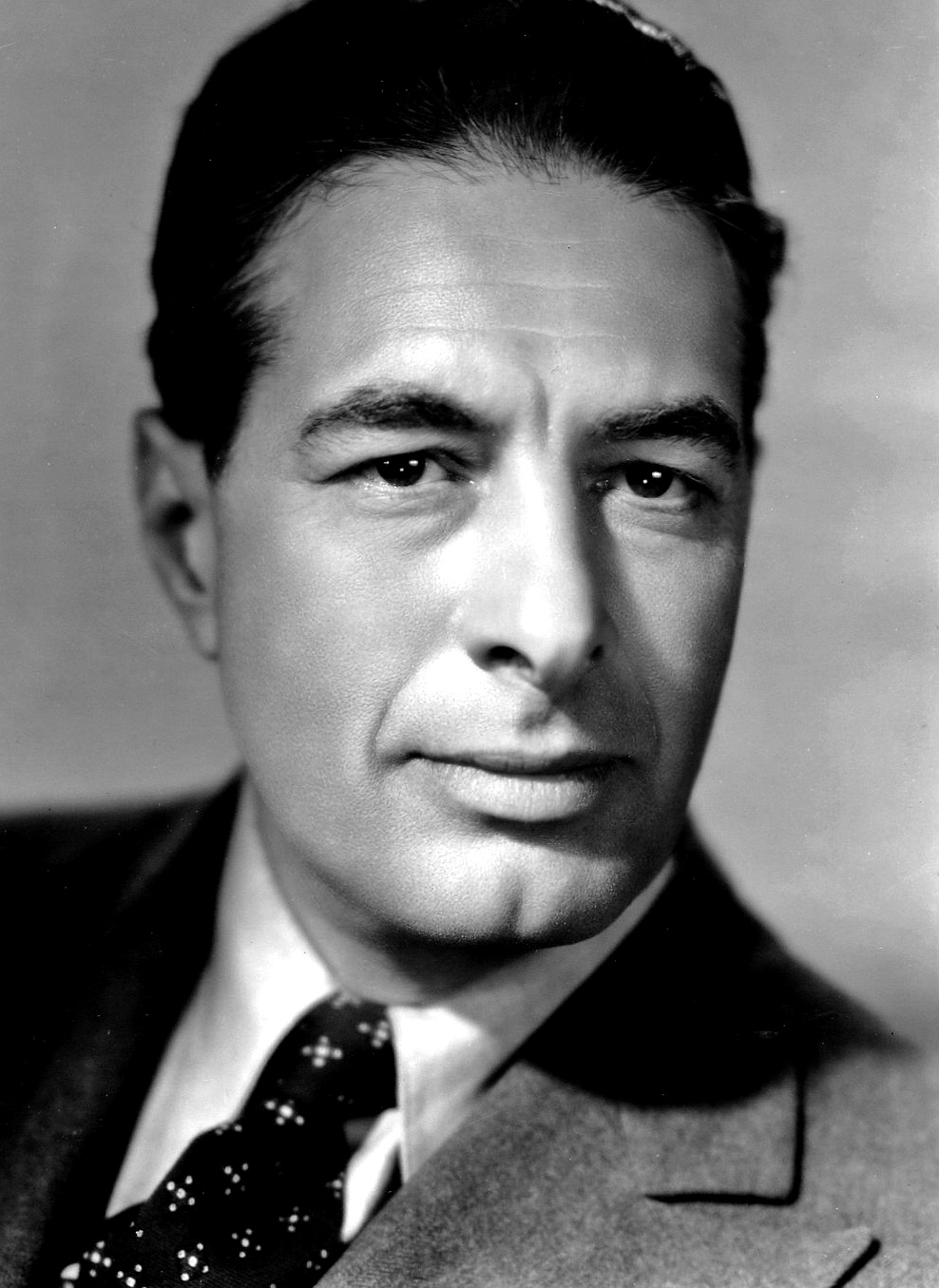
- Pichel in the 1940s
- Born: Irving Pichel; June 24, 1891; Pittsburgh, Pennsylvania, U.S.
- Died: July 13, 1954 (aged 63); Hollywood, California, U.S.
- Resting place: Mountain View Cemetery, Oakland, Alameda County, California, U.S.
- Occupations: Actor; Director
- Years active: 1920–1954
- Spouse: Violette Wilson
- Children: 3
- Relatives: J. Stitt Wilson (father-in-law)

Irving Pichel (June 24, 1891 – July 13, 1954) was an American actor and film director, who won acclaim both as an actor and director in his Hollywood career.

== Career ==
Pichel was born to a Jewish family in Pittsburgh. He attended Pittsburgh Central High School with George S. Kaufman. The two collaborated on a play, The Failure. Pichel graduated from Harvard University in 1914 and went immediately into the theater. He had a feature role from January through May 1915 in the Boston production of Common Clay, appearing with Alfred Lunt and Mary Young.

Pichel's first work in musical theatre was as a technical director for the theater of the San Francisco Bohemian Club; he also helped with the annual summer pageant, held at the elite Bohemian Grove, in which up to 300 of its wealthy, influential members from finance and government participate. With this expertise, he was also hired by Wallace Rice as the main narrator in Rice's ambitious pageant play, Primavera, the Masque of Santa Barbara in 1920. He founded the Berkeley Playhouse in 1923 and served as its director until 1926.

== Actor ==
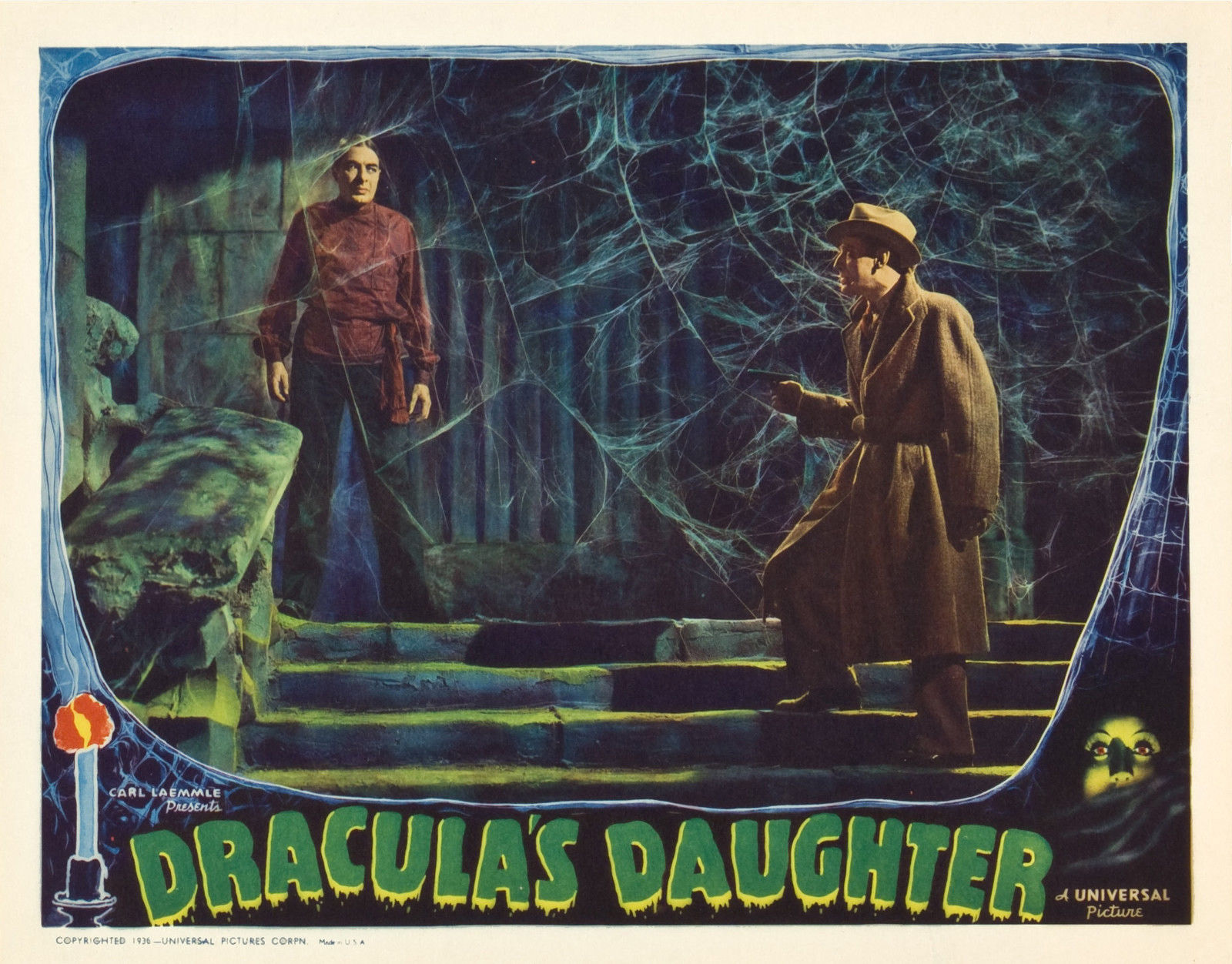
Pichel (left) in Dracula's Daughter (1936)

Pichel moved to Los Angeles where he studied acting at the Pasadena Playhouse. It was there that Pichel achieved considerable acclaim as the title character in the landmark Pasadena Playhouse production of Eugene O'Neill's play Lazarus Laughed in 1927. Two years later, when the studios were hiring any theater-trained actors suitable for talkies, he was signed to a contract with Paramount.

Pichel worked steadily as a character actor throughout the 1930s, including the early version of the Theodore Dreiser novel, An American Tragedy (1931), Madame Butterfly (1932), in a low budget version of Oliver Twist (1933) as Fagin, in Cleopatra (1934), alongside Leslie Howard in Michael Curtiz's British Agent (1934), as the servant Sandor in Dracula's Daughter (1936), in the Bette Davis film Jezebel (1938), as the proprietor of a seedy roadhouse in the once scandalous The Story of Temple Drake (1933) and as a Mexican general in Juarez (1939).

Pichel also performed on radio, played small parts in several of the films that he later directed, often without credit, and was the narrator in the John Ford films How Green Was My Valley (1941) and the Western, She Wore a Yellow Ribbon (1949).

== Director ==
Pichel was a friend of the screenwriter George S. Kaufman and joined the circle of those witty and iconoclastic friends who had abandoned the Algonquin Round Table in New York to make small fortunes in the talkies. Pichel was soon drawn to directing and his character acting dropped off after 1939. He co-directed several B-movies until he signed with 20th Century Fox in 1939 and began directing their established stars.

Much of his directing work was in anti-Nazi and pro-British-themed films in the years before the United States entered the war. The Man I Married (1940), for example, starring Joan Bennett, Francis Lederer, and Otto Kruger, centers on an American wife slowly discovering her German husband is a Nazi, and incorporated 1938 newsreel footage of the rise of Nazism. Hudson's Bay (1941) was a highly pro-British, much-fictionalized historical adventure of the British founding of Canada with Paul Muni and Gene Tierney.

The Pied Piper (1942) recounts the story of an aged Englishman trying to get five children out of Nazi-occupied France. Monty Woolley played the lead role (and earned an Oscar nomination), and Otto Preminger, himself a refugee from occupied Austria, plays a Nazi commandant. The film, with a Nunnally Johnson screenplay, was highly praised and also nominated for an Oscar for Best Picture and for best black-and-white cinematography by Edward Crongjager. "For the most part," wrote Bosley Crowther in The New York Times, "Irving Pichel, the director, has muted the frightfulness of war and shown it through suggestion instead of displaying it realistically in all its horror...Few films have come out of this war that are as bright, touching and suspenseful as The Pied Piper."

The Moon Is Down (1943) was an adaptation of John Steinbeck's novel. The book was based on the Nazi invasion of neutral Norway in 1940, published in March 1942 and subsequently translated into French and distributed in Europe as an inspiration for local resistance to Nazi occupation. In both film and novel, a small Norwegian village gradually discovers how to organize resistance to Nazi invaders; the film stars Sir Cedric Hardwicke and Henry Travers and also marked Natalie Wood's debut as a child actress (though she was uncredited), whom Pichel had discovered. With a screenplay by future blacklisted writer, Nunnally Johnson, this was named as one of the top ten films of the year by the National Board of Review. It played in Sweden in November 1944.

Pichel also directed Alan Ladd in O.S.S. (1944), written and produced by the later James Bond screenwriter, Richard Maibaum, and featuring an introduction by Office of Strategic Services (O.S.S.) founder, Wild Bill Donovan. The film showed Ladd finding love in occupied France under the auspices of the nascent O.S.S., which was the precursor to the Central Intelligence Agency. Bosley Crowther of The New York Times termed it "tense, tightly written and swiftly paced," and credited the film as the very first on the O.S.S.

Several more war-themed films followed, including the sentimental A Medal for Benny (1945) which led to J. Carrol Naish gaining a Best Supporting Actor nomination. Tomorrow Is Forever, (1946) starred Orson Welles as an American soldier who is presumed killed in WW1 only to return to America and Claudette Colbert as his wife who remarries; Natalie Wood, in her first credited role, plays an Austrian child with a German accent. Mr. Peabody and the Mermaid (1948), another film from a Nunnally Johnson script in which a married man, played by William Powell, accidentally catches a mermaid on his fishing line. Made about the same time was The Miracle of the Bells (also 1948), a big budget film which failed at the box office about an impoverished coal town with Frank Sinatra miscast as a priest. "St. Michael ought to sue", wrote the reviewer in Time magazine.

Despite his patriotic war oeuvre, Pichel soon came under scrutiny by the House Committee on Un-American Activities, cofounded and steered by Mississippi Congressman John E. Rankin who routinely and specifically attacked Jews in the Congressional Record and had bitterly resisted America entering World War II. Like many of those who came under HUAC investigation by the late 1940s, Pichel moved into film noir in They Won't Believe Me (1947). Here, Pichel had the benefit of longtime Hitchcock collaborator and screenwriter, Joan Harrison, as his producer, who would go on to produce the television series Alfred Hitchcock Presents. Susan Hayward, Jane Greer, and Robert Young starred, with the added skills of cinematographer Harry J. Wild, who worked on such key films noir as Murder My Sweet (1944) and Johnny Angel (1945).

The low-budget, black-and-white Quicksand (1950) featured one of Mickey Rooney's finest performances as a desperate good kid going bad, and emigre Peter Lorre as an unforgiving arcade operator. Rooney and Peter Lorre put their own money together to finance it, and thus gave Pichel, the blacklist already looming over him, one of his last Hollywood films.

Striking out in another nascent genre, Pichel pioneered scientific authenticity in an early Technicolor science fiction film Destination Moon (1950), produced by George Pal. It won the Oscar for Special Visual Effects, for effects director, Lee Zavitz. The film was also nominated for the Academy Award for Best Art Direction, for Ernst Fegte and George Sawley. At the 1st Berlin International Film Festival it won the Bronze Berlin Bear Award, for "Thrillers and Adventure Films." Pichel chose as collaborators Robert A. Heinlein, who did uncredited work on the script, and astronomical illustrator Chesley Bonestell, who contributed the painted lunar backdrops.

Pichel's last Hollywood film was for Randolph Scott in an unexceptional, though profitable, Columbia western, Santa Fe (1951), but his Hollywood career ground to a halt in the face of the blacklist. His last films as a director were independent European productions: Martin Luther (1953), funded by the Lutheran Church, in one of its rare forays into film production, and Day of Triumph (1954), about the life of Christ. Shot on location in Wiesbaden, Germany, Martin Luther was nominated for Oscars for both its black-and-white cinematography by Joseph C. Brun, and its art direction and set design recreating the early 1500s by Fritz Maurischat and Paul Markwitz. It was named as fourth in the top ten films of the year by the National Board of Review.

Pichel, a lifelong Christian Socialist, died one week after Day of Triumph was completed and before the premiere.

== Blacklist ==
In 1947, Pichel was one of 19 members of the Hollywood community who were subpoenaed by the House Un-American Activities Committee during the United States' second Red Scare. This group became known as the "Hollywood Nineteen" and the "Unfriendly Nineteen" because they refused to name suspected Communist agents to the committee. Though it was not clear that Pichel had ever been a Communist, the committee assumed he had communist sympathies because he had directed the anti-Nazi film, The Man I Married (1940), and investigated him as a case of "premature antifascism." Pichel was cleared, but soon after developed a chronic heart condition which was treated until his death in 1954.

While Pichel was ultimately not called to testify, he was blacklisted, forcing him eventually to leave the United States in order to direct his final pictures. Pichel's friend Joseph C. Youngerman, a prop handler and assistant director in Hollywood, later confirmed that Pichel had in fact been a member of the Communist Party.

== Personal life ==
Irving Pichel married Violette Wilson, daughter of Jackson Stitt Wilson, a Methodist minister and Socialist mayor of Berkeley, California. Her sister was actress Viola Barry. Irving and Violette had three sons: Julian Irving Pichel, Marlowe Agnew Pichel, and Pichel Wilson Pichel.

== Posthumous awards ==
A special 1951 Hugo Award for Best Dramatic Presentation was retroactively awarded by the 59th World Science Fiction Convention 50 years later, in 2001, to Destination Moon for being one of the science fiction films eligible during calendar year 1950. (50 years, 75 years, or 100 years prior is the eligibility requirement governing the awarding of Retro Hugos.)

The film was also nominated for AFI's Top 10 Science Fiction Films list.

Martin Luther was given a special 50th anniversary re-release on DVD by Gateway Films, including a book that is a biography of the film itself.

== Filmography ==
=== Actor ===
- The Right to Love (1930) as Caleb Evans (film debut)
- Murder by the Clock (1931) as Philip Endicott
- An American Tragedy (1931) as District Attorney Orville Mason
- The Road to Reno (1931) as Robert Millet
- The Cheat (1931) as Hardy Livingstone
- Two Kinds of Women (1932) as Senator Krull
- The Miracle Man (1932) as Henry Holmes
- Forgotten Commandments (1932) as Prof. Marinoff
- Westward Passage (1932) as Harry Ottendorf
- The Painted Woman (1932) as Robert Dunn, Lawyer
- Strange Justice (1932) as Waters
- Wild Girl (1932) as Rufe Waters
- Madame Butterfly (1932) as Yomadori
- The Billion Dollar Scandal (1933) as Albert Griswold
- The Mysterious Rider (1933) as Cliff Harkness
- The Woman Accused (1933) as District Attorney Clark
- Oliver Twist (1933) as Fagin
- King of the Jungle (1933) as Corey
- The Story of Temple Drake (1933) as Lee Goodwin
- I'm No Angel (1933) as Bob – Clayton's Attorney (uncredited)
- The Right to Romance (1933) as Dr. Beck
- Fog Over Frisco (1934) as Jake Bello
- Return of the Terror (1934) as Daniel Burke
- British Agent (1934) as Sergei Pavlov
- Cleopatra (1934) as Apollodorus
- I Am a Thief (1934) as Count Trentini
- The Silver Streak (1934) as Captain Herman Bronte
- Special Agent (1935) as U.S. District Attorney
- Three Kids and a Queen (1935) as Kraft
- Don't Gamble with Love (1936) as Rick Collins
- The House of a Thousand Candles (1936) as Anton Sebastian
- Special Agent K-7 (1936) as Lester Owens
- Dracula's Daughter (1936) as Sandor
- Hearts in Bondage (1936) as Secretary of War Sumner Gideon Welles
- Down to the Sea (1936) as Alex Fotakis
- General Spanky (1936) as Simmons
- Join the Marines (1937) as Colonel Leonard
- High, Wide, and Handsome (1937) as Mr. Stark
- The Sheik Steps Out (1937)
- Jezebel (1938) as Huger
- There Goes My Heart (1938) as Mr. Gorman
- Newsboys' Home (1938) as Tom Davenport
- Topper Takes a Trip (1938) as Prosecutor
- Juarez (1939) as Gen. Carbajal
- Exile Express (1939) as Victor
- Dick Tracy's G-Men (1939) as Nicolas Zarnoff
- Rio (1939) as Rocco
- The Great Commandment (1939) as Jesus Christ (voice, uncredited)
- Torture Ship (1939) as Dr. Herbert Stander
- How Green Was My Valley (1941) as adult Huw Morgan (the unseen narrator)
- The Moon Is Down (1943) as Peder, Inn Keeper (uncredited)
- December 7th (1943) as Narrator (voice, uncredited)
- Tomorrow Is Forever (1946) as Radio Commentator (voice, uncredited)
- The Bride Wore Boots (1946) as Steeplechase Announcer (uncredited)
- They Won't Believe Me (1947) as Courtroom Extra (uncredited)
- Something in the Wind (1947) as Dynamo Dan (voice, uncredited)
- She Wore a Yellow Ribbon (1949) as Narrator (voice, uncredited)
- The Great Rupert (1950) as Puzzled Pedestrian (uncredited)
- Quicksand (1950) as Radio Announcer (voice, uncredited)
- Destination Moon (1950) as Off Screen Narrator of Woody Woodpecker Cartoon (uncredited)
- Santa Fe (1951) as Harned
- Martin Luther (1953) as Brueck

=== Director ===
- The Most Dangerous Game (1932) (directorial debut)
- Before Dawn (1933)
- She (1935)
- The Gentleman from Louisiana (1936)
- The Duke Comes Back (1937)
- The Sheik Steps Out (1937)
- Beware of Ladies (1937)
- Larceny on the Air (1937)
- The Great Commandment (1939)
- Earthbound (1940)
- The Man I Married (1940)
- Hudson's Bay (1941)
- Dance Hall (1941)
- Secret Agent of Japan (1942)
- The Pied Piper (1942)
- Life Begins at Eight-Thirty (1942)
- The Moon Is Down (1943)
- Happy Land (1943)
- And Now Tomorrow (1944)
- A Medal for Benny (1945)
- Colonel Effingham's Raid (1946)
- Tomorrow Is Forever (1946)
- The Bride Wore Boots (1946)
- O.S.S. (1946)
- Temptation (1946)
- They Won't Believe Me (1947)
- Something in the Wind (1947)
- The Miracle of the Bells (1948)
- Mr. Peabody and the Mermaid (1948)
- Without Honor (1949)
- The Great Rupert (1950)
- Quicksand (1950)
- Destination Moon (1950)
- Santa Fe (1951)
- Martin Luther (1953)
- Day of Triumph (1954) (final film)
