= William Newell (actor) =

American actor (1894–1967)

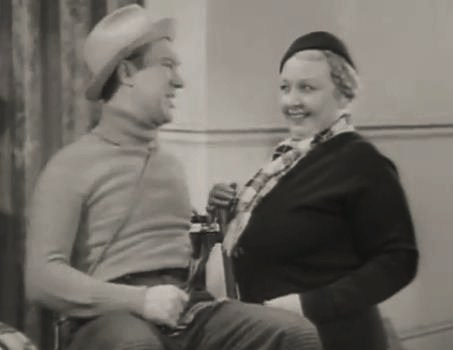
- William Newell and Greta Meyer in Bill Cracks Down (1937)
- Born: January 6, 1894; Millville, New Jersey, U.S.
- Died: February 21, 1967 (aged 73); Los Angeles, California, U.S.
- Occupation: Actor
- Years active: 1933–1964

William M. Newell (January 6, 1894 – February 21, 1967) was an American film actor.

== Biography ==
Newell was most active in the 1930s, familiar to fans of the Our Gang short subjects in his recurring role as Alfalfa's father, and as Dr. Henley on Our Miss Brooks. Newell was cast as a hobo in "Little Boy Blew," one of the last episodes of the Walter Brennan sitcom, The Real McCoys, then airing on CBS.

He died in 1967 in Studio City, Los Angeles and is interred at the Westwood Village Memorial Park Cemetery.

== Selected filmography ==
- Bombshell (1933) - Lola's Chauffeur (uncredited)
- The Woman in Red (1935) - Reporter (uncredited)
- Gold Diggers of 1935 (1935) - Newspaper Reporter (uncredited)
- Alias Mary Dow (1935) - Reporter (uncredited)
- Honeymoon Limited (1935) - Cop (uncredited)
- Here Comes the Band (1935) - Greasy (uncredited)
- Rendezvous (1935) - Carter's Receptionist (uncredited)
- Riffraff (1936) - Pete
- The Voice of Bugle Ann (1936) - Mr. Tanner
- Wife vs. Secretary (1936) - Tom Wilson (uncredited)
- Absolute Quiet (1936) - Bill Dahle, a Drunk Pilot (uncredited)
- Mariners of the Sky/Navy Born (1936) - Lieutenant Bill Lyons
- Fury (1936) - Roadside Service Station Owner (uncredited)
- San Francisco (1936) - Man in Breadline (uncredited)
- Sitting on the Moon (1936) - Mike
- Bulldog Edition (1936) - Charlie Hunter
- Libeled Lady (1936) - Divorce Detective
- Mr. Cinderella (1936) - First Hotel Clerk (uncredited)
- Robinson Crusoe of Clipper Island (1936, Serial) - Hank McGlaurie
- The Big Show (1936) - Lee Wilson
- Happy Go Lucky (1936) - Charlie Davis
- Beware of Ladies (1936) - Sniff
- The Mandarin Mystery (1936) - Detective Guffy
- A Man Betrayed (1936) - Gabby
- Larceny on the Air (1937) - Andrews
- Bill Cracks Down (1937) - Eddie 'Porky' Plunkett
- The Hit Parade (1937) - Burt Ambrose (uncredited)
- Make Way for Tomorrow (1937) - Ticket Seller (uncredited)
- Dangerous Holiday (1937) - Solitaire
- Rhythm in the Clouds (1937) - Clyde Lyons
- City Girl (1938) - Gas Station Attendant (uncredited)
- Yellow Jack (1938) - Soldier (uncredited)
- Speed to Burn (1938) - Policeman (uncredited)
- Sing You Sinners (1938) - Waiter (uncredited)
- Meet the Girls (1938) - 1st Waiter (uncredited)
- Slander House (1938) - Terry Kent
- Orphans of the Street (1938) - Charlie (uncredited)
- Ride a Crooked Mile (1938) - Kracaw (uncredited)
- There's That Woman Again (1938) - Waiter (uncredited)
- Alfalfa's Aunt (1939, Short) - John Switzer
- Honolulu (1939) - Second Intern (uncredited)
- Everybody's Baby (1939) - Waiter (uncredited)
- Rose of Washington Square (1939) - Hotel Clerk (uncredited)
- Invitation to Happiness (1939) - Waiter (uncredited)
- Good Girls Go to Paris (1939) - Nightclub Waiter (uncredited)
- Naughty but Nice (1939) - Arranger (uncredited)
- Second Fiddle (1939) - Make-Up Artist (uncredited)
- Mr. Smith Goes to Washington (1939) - Maxie T. Bookmaker (uncredited)
- The Housekeeper's Daughter (1939) - Reporter (uncredited)
- Little Accident (1939) - Photographer (uncredited)
- The Invisible Killer (1939) - Detective Sergeant Pat Dugan
- The Amazing Mr. Williams (1939) - Waiter (uncredited)
- The Great Victor Herbert (1939) - Fred Clayton (uncredited)
- Nick Carter, Master Detective (1939) - Taxi Driver (uncredited)
- Swanee River (1939) - Bill, Stagehand (uncredited)
- The Invisible Man Returns (1940) - Minor Role (uncredited)
- The Ghost Comes Home (1940) - Nightclub Waiter (uncredited)
- All About Hash (1940, Short) - Alfalfa's father
- The Doctor Takes a Wife (1940) - Soda Jerk (uncredited)
- Bubbling Troubles (1940, Short) - Alfalfa's Dad
- Hold That Woman! (1940)
- Andy Hardy Meets Debutante (1940) - Insurance Investigator (uncredited)
- The Great Profile (1940) - Reporter (uncredited)
- He Stayed for Breakfast (1940) - Waiter (uncredited)
- Good Bad Boys (1940, Short) - Alfalfa's Father (uncredited)
- Girl from Havana (1940) - Henry Hewitt (uncredited)
- Public Deb No. 1 (1940) - Reporter (uncredited)
- City for Conquest (1940) - Max's Lyricist (uncredited)
- Melody and Moonlight (1940) - Sailor (uncredited)
- Slightly Tempted (1940) - Warcross
- Mysterious Doctor Satan (1940, Serial) - Speed Martin
- Caught in the Act (1941) - Police Sergeant Riley
- The Strawberry Blonde (1941) - Man (uncredited)
- Blondie Goes Latin (1941) - Steward Ringing Chime and Crying (uncredited)
- Broadway Limited (1941) - Train Fireman (uncredited)
- San Antonio Rose (1941) - Headwaiter (uncredited)
- The Big Store (1941) - Press Photographer (uncredited)
- Puddin' Head (1941) - Studio Tour Guide (uncredited)
- Hello, Sucker (1941) - Mr. Giffle (uncredited)
- The Bride Came C.O.D. (1941) - McGee's Pilot
- Here Comes Mr. Jordan (1941) - Murdoch Handler (uncredited)
- Manpower (1941) - Lineman at Cafe Counter (uncredited)
- Ice-Capades (1941) - Harry Stimson (uncredited)
- World Premiere (1941) - Fireman (uncredited)
- Navy Blues (1941) - Shore Patrolman #1 (uncredited)
- Sailors on Leave (1941) - Stuffy (uncredited)
- You Belong to Me (1941) - Parking Attendant (uncredited)
- Three Girls About Town (1941) - Laundry Man (uncredited)
- The Devil Pays Off (1941) - Second Steward (uncredited)
- Miss Polly (1941) - Hubert, New Postman
- Skylark (1941) - Counterman (uncredited)
- Bedtime Story (1941) - Auto Court Manager (uncredited)
- Pardon My Stripes (1942) - Airport Clerk (uncredited)
- A Tragedy at Midnight (1942) - Swanson, Greg's Agent
- The Lady Is Willing (1942) - Counterman (uncredited)
- Two Yanks in Trinidad (1942) - Taxi Driver (uncredited)
- Who Is Hope Schuyler? (1942) - Perley Seymour
- A Desperate Chance for Ellery Queen (1942) - Reporter on Telephone (uncredited)
- Moonlight Masquerade (1942) - Bartender (uncredited)
- Calling Dr. Gillespie (1942) - Orderly with Tray of Water (uncredited)
- Priorities on Parade (1942) - Vendor (uncredited)
- Enemy Agents Meet Ellery Queen (1942) - Apartment Tenant (uncredited)
- Footlight Serenade (1942) - Writer (uncredited)
- The Old Homestead (1942) - Croupier (uncredited)
- Orchestra Wives (1942) - Hotel Clerk (uncredited)
- The Major and the Minor (1942) - Ticket Agent #2 (uncredited)
- Henry Aldrich, Editor (1942) - Process Server (uncredited)
- Get Hep to Love (1942) - Janitor (uncredited)
- You Can't Escape Forever (1942) - Reporter at Execution (uncredited)
- A Night to Remember (1942) - Police Photographer (uncredited)
- The Valley of Vanishing Men (1942, Serial) - Cavalry Sentry (uncredited)
- When Johnny Comes Marching Home (1942) - Taxicab Driver (uncredited)
- Ice-Capades Revue (1942) - Deakin (uncredited)
- Lady Bodyguard (1943) - Chef (uncredited)
- Keeper of the Flame (1943) - Piggot
- The Outlaw (1943) - Drunken Cowboy (uncredited)
- No Place for a Lady (1943) - Toreador Cafe Waiter (uncredited)
- The Meanest Man in the World (1943) - Photographer (uncredited)
- Slightly Dangerous (1943) - Waiter (uncredited)
- Good Morning, Judge (1943) - Bartender (uncredited)
- All by Myself (1943) - Price (uncredited)
- Honeymoon Lodge (1943) - Bartender (uncredited)
- Nobody's Darling (1943) - Bus Driver (uncredited)
- Johnny Come Lately (1943) - Vagrant (uncredited)
- Fired Wife (1943) - Bartender (uncredited)
- Top Man (1943) - Secretary (uncredited)
- Dangerous Blondes (1943) - Attendant (uncredited)
- Footlight Glamour (1943) - Taxi Driver #2 (uncredited)
- Sing a Jingle (1944) - Wiggins
- See Here, Private Hargrove (1944) - Mr. Smith (uncredited)
- Gypsy Wildcat (1944) - (uncredited)
- Kansas City Kitty (1944) - Gas Man (uncredited)
- Babes on Swing Street (1944) - Customer (uncredited)
- Irish Eyes Are Smiling (1944) - Hotel Clerk (uncredited)
- Bowery to Broadway (1944) - Reformer (uncredited)
- The Missing Juror (1944) - Wally—Counterman (uncredited)
- My Gal Loves Music (1944) - Soda Clerk (uncredited)
- Dancing in Manhattan (1944) - Waiter (uncredited)
- Together Again (1944) - Cabby (uncredited)
- Let's Go Steady (1945) - Cab Driver (uncredited)
- She Gets Her Man (1945) - Bettor (uncredited)
- Her Lucky Night (1945) - Proprietor
- Without Love (1945) - Soldier (uncredited)
- Honeymoon Ahead (1945) - Joe (uncredited)
- That's the Spirit (1945) - Detective (uncredited)
- Wonder Man (1945) - Man at Library (uncredited)
- Captain Eddie (1945) - (uncredited)
- Blonde from Brooklyn (1945) - Waiter (uncredited)
- On Stage Everybody (1945) - Mason (uncredited)
- The Lost Weekend (1945) - Liquor Store Proprietor (uncredited)
- The Dolly Sisters (1945) - Bartender (uncredited)
- Snafu (1945) - Cleaner (uncredited)
- Hit the Hay (1945) - Cab Driver (uncredited)
- Masquerade in Mexico (1945) - FBI Agent (uncredited)
- The Stork Club (1945) - Higgins, Judy's Chauffeur (uncredited)
- Out of the Depths (1945) - Charlie Anderson
- Adventure (1945) - Barber #1 (uncredited)
- Girl on the Spot (1946) - Lightfoot Lewis (uncredited)
- Breakfast in Hollywood (1946) - Cop with Bench Warrant (uncredited)
- Young Widow (1946) - Charlie (uncredited)
- The Kid from Brooklyn (1946) - Photographer (uncredited)
- House of Horrors (1946) - Deputy Coroner (uncredited)
- The Hoodlum Saint (1946) - Silver Web Waiter (scenes deleted)
- The Man Who Dared (1946) - Police Sergeant Clay
- The Runaround (1946) - Detective Moyer (uncredited)
- Inside Job (1946) - Store Detective (uncredited)
- Deadline for Murder (1946) - First Player (uncredited)
- Bowery Bombshell (1946) - Detective Dugan
- Till the End of Time (1946) - Warrant Officer (uncredited)
- Faithful in My Fashion (1946) - Phil Cummings, Jewelry Clerk (uncredited)
- The Magnificent Rogue (1946) - Stage Manager (uncredited)
- The Best Years of Our Lives (1946) - Waiter at Bank Dinner (uncredited)
- Dick Tracy vs. Cueball (1946) - Piano Player (uncredited)
- Wake Up and Dream (1946) - Blonde's Boy Friend (uncredited)
- Boston Blackie and the Law (1946) - Mr. Jones (uncredited)
- Alias Mr. Twilight (1946) - Delivery Man (uncredited)
- The Great Morgan (1946) - Film Character (uncredited)
- The Show-Off (1946) - Court Clerk (uncredited)
- Lady in the Lake (1946) - Drunk (uncredited)
- Angel and the Badman (1947) - Headwaiter (uncredited)
- Suddenly, It's Spring (1947) - Pier Manager (uncredited)
- Out of the Blue (1947) - Danny the Bartender (uncredited)
- That's My Gal (1947) - Sam (uncredited)
- The Trouble with Women (1947) - Court Clerk (uncredited)
- Second Chance (1947) - Pinky
- The Secret Life of Walter Mitty (1947) - Taxicab Traffic Manager (uncredited)
- Philo Vance's Secret Mission (1947) - Deputy (uncredited)
- Magic Town (1947) - Radio Comic in Montage (uncredited)
- Key Witness (1947) - Smiley
- Roses Are Red (1947) - Reporter (uncredited)
- Wedlock Deadlock (1947, Short)
- Road to Rio (1947) - Meat Stamper (uncredited)
- The Senator Was Indiscreet (1947) - Elevator Operator (uncredited)
- Killer McCoy (1947) - Waiter (uncredited)
- Doctor Jim (1947) - Editor
- Song of My Heart (1948) - Doorman
- If You Knew Susie (1948) - Empire Theater Janitor (uncredited)
- The Return of the Whistler (1948) - Hotel-Room Painter (uncredited)
- The Fuller Brush Man (1948) - Police Announcer (uncredited)
- Bob and Sally (1948) - Jean Andren
- Up in Central Park (1948) - Stage Manager (uncredited)
- The Babe Ruth Story (1948) - Brother Francis (scenes deleted)
- That Wonderful Urge (1948) - Reporter (uncredited)
- Blondie's Secret (1948) - Mr. Ford, Grocery Cashier (uncredited)
- The Lone Wolf and His Lady (1949) - Ava Rockling (uncredited)
- Mighty Joe Young (1949) - Man at Bar (uncredited)
- Tell It to the Judge (1949) - Bartender (uncredited)
- The Traveling Saleswoman (1950) - Bartender (uncredited)
- A Woman of Distinction (1950) - Bartender (uncredited)
- Ma and Pa Kettle Go to Town (1950) - Horace 'Hank' Hawkshaw, Police Desk Sergeant (uncredited)
- Kill the Umpire (1950) - Ted (uncredited)
- Louisa (1950) - Movie Usher (uncredited)
- To Please a Lady (1950) - Hank Harmon (uncredited)
- M (1951) - Detective Questioning Blonde About License Plate (uncredited)
- Only the Valiant (1951) - Corporal of the Guard (uncredited)
- Bright Victory (1951) - Todd, the Bartender (uncredited)
- Meet Me After the Show (1951) - Stage Manager (uncredited)
- Criminal Lawyer (1951) - Mac, Bartender (uncredited)
- Sunny Side of the Street (1951) - Recording Studio Engineer (uncredited)
- The Lady Pays Off (1951) - Bartender
- Wild Stallion (1952) - Sergeant (uncredited)
- High Noon (1952) - Jimmy, drunk with eye patch (uncredited)
- Young Man with Ideas (1952) - Party Waiter (uncredited)
- Models Inc. (1952) - Photo Studio Customer (uncredited)
- Here Come the Marines (1952) - Major Desmond, CIA
- Francis Goes to West Point (1952) - Drunk (uncredited)
- Bonzo Goes to College (1952) - Drunk (uncredited)
- Flat Top (1952) - Captain (uncredited)
- The I Don't Care Girl (1953) - Bartender (uncredited)
- Abbott and Costello Go to Mars (1953) - Drunk (uncredited)
- Let's Do It Again (1953) - Cabbie (scenes deleted)
- Hot News (1953) - Policeman (uncredited)
- Escape from Fort Bravo (1953) - Symore (uncredited)
- Wicked Woman (1953) - Pinball Player (uncredited)
- Riot in Cell Block 11 (1954) - Guard on Phone (uncredited)
- Tennessee Champ (1954) - Ring Announcer (uncredited)
- Phffft (1954) - Workman (uncredited)
- Seven Angry Men (1955) - Farmer Who Finds Body (uncredited)
- The Eternal Sea (1955) - Dining Room Captain (uncredited)
- Wichita (1955) - Bartender (uncredited)
- My Sister Eileen (1955) - Plumber (uncredited)
- Alfred Hitchcock Presents (1956) (Season 1 Episode 39 "Momentum") - Charlie
- Our Miss Brooks (1956) - Dr. Henley
- Mister Cory (1957) - Ned, Owner (uncredited)
- Short Cut to Hell (1957) - Hotel Manager (uncredited)
- The Missouri Traveler (1958) - Pos Neely
- The Sheepman (1958) - Bartender (uncredited)
- Last Train from Gun Hill (1959) - Harper House Clerk (uncredited)
- Alfred Hitchcock Presents (1960) (Season 6 Episode 3 "Very Moral Theft") - Mr. Fescue
- Toby Tyler (1960) - Jailbird (uncredited)
- Who Was That Lady? (1960) - Schultz (uncredited)
- Pollyanna (1960) - Mr. Hooper (uncredited)
- Alfred Hitchcock Presents (1961) (Season 6 Episode 22 "The Horseplayer") - Second Bank Teller
- The Alfred Hitchcock Hour (1962) (Season 1 Episode 4: "I Saw the Whole Thing") - Sam Peterson
- The Alfred Hitchcock Hour (1963) (Season 2 Episode 3: "Terror at Northfield") - Mr. Jones
- A Global Affair (1964) - Waiter (uncredited)
