= Stolen Sweets (film) =

1934 American comedy film directed by Richard Thorpe

- Theatrical release poster
- Directed by: Richard Thorpe
- Screenplay by: Karl Brown
- Produced by: George R. Batcheller
- Starring: Sally Blane; Charles Starrett; Jameson Thomas; Claude King; John Harron; Polly Ann Young
- Cinematography: M. A. Anderson
- Edited by: Roland D. Reed
- Production company: Chesterfield Pictures
- Distributed by: Chesterfield Pictures
- Release date: March 15, 1934
- Running time: 75 minutes
- Country: United States
- Language: English

Stolen Sweets is a 1934 American pre-Code comedy film directed by Richard Thorpe and written by Karl Brown. The film stars Sally Blane, Charles Starrett, Jameson Thomas, Claude King, John Harron and Polly Ann Young. The film was released on March 15, 1934, by Chesterfield Pictures.

== Cast ==
- Sally Blane as Patricia Belmont
- Charles Starrett as Bill Smith
- Jameson Thomas as Barrington Thorne
- Claude King as Henry Belmont
- John Harron as Sam Ragland
- Polly Ann Young as Betty Harkness
- Tom Ricketts as Stoner
- Aggie Herring as The Cook
- Jane Keckley as Priscilla Prattleigh
- Goodee Montgomery as Mrs. Barrington Thorne
- Maynard Holmes as Phil Saunders
