= The Invisible Killer =

1939 film

- Directed by: Sam Newfield
- Written by: Joseph O'Donnell
- Based on: The Fox and the Hound by Maxwell Shane
- Produced by: Sigmund Neufeld
- Starring: Grace Bradley; Roland Drew; William Newell
- Cinematography: Jack Greenhalgh
- Edited by: Holbrook N. Todd
- Music by: David Chudnow
- Production company: Sigmund Neufeld Productions
- Distributed by: Producers Distributing Corporation
- Release date: November 14, 1939
- Running time: 63 minutes
- Country: United States
- Language: English

The Invisible Killer is a 1939 American mystery film directed by Sam Newfield and starring Grace Bradley, Roland Drew and William Newell. It was one of the earliest films made by Producers Releasing Corporation, a low-budget outfit concentrating on second features.

== Plot ==
A racketeer offers to inform the district attorney about the ringleaders of a gambling syndicate but is murdered before he can do so by a seeming "invisible killer." Newspaper reporter Sue Walker and her policeman, fiancée Jerry Brown take up the investigation.

== Cast ==
- Grace Bradley as Sue Walker
- Roland Drew as Lt. Jerry Brown
- William Newell as Det. Sgt. Pat Dugan
- Alex Callam as Arthur Enslee
- Frank Coletti as Vani Martin
- Sidney Grayler as Lefty Ross
- Crane Whitley as Dist. Atty. Richard Sutton
- Boyd Irwin as Mr. Cunningham
- Jean Brooks as Gloria Cunningham
- David Oliver as Llewellyln Worcester, Sutton's Valet
- Harry Woth as Tyler, Sutton's Secretary
- Ernie Adams as Squint, the Croupier
- Kernan Cripps as Plainclothesman
- John Elliott as Gambler
- Al Ferguson as Detective Guarding Tyler
- Larry Steers as Sue's Boss

== Bibliography ==
- Gates, Phillipa. Detecting Women: Gender and the Hollywood Detective Film. SUNY Press, 2011.
