= Beware of Ladies =

1936 film by Irving Pichel

- Film poster
- Directed by: Irving Pichel
- Written by: L.C. Dublin
- Produced by: Nat Levine; Herman Schlom
- Starring: Donald Cook; Judith Allen; George Meeker
- Cinematography: William Nobles
- Edited by: Ernest J. Nims
- Music by: Harry Grey
- Production company: Republic Pictures
- Distributed by: Republic Pictures
- Release date: December 21, 1936
- Running time: 64 minutes
- Country: United States
- Language: English

Beware of Ladies is a 1936 American crime film directed by Irving Pichel and starring Donald Cook, Judith Allen and George Meeker.

== Plot ==
A female newspaper reporter is sent by her editor to cover a political contest between a naïve newcomer and a seasoned and corrupt veteran.

== Cast ==
- Donald Cook as George Martin
- Judith Allen as Betty White
- George Meeker as Freddie White
- Goodee Montgomery as Gertie
- Russell Hopton as Randy Randall
- William Newell as Sniff
- Dwight Frye as Swanson
- Thomas E. Jackson as Albert Simmons
- Josephine Whittell as Alice McDonald
- William Crowell as Tony Baxter
- Robert Strange as John Williams
- Robert Emmett Keane as Charles Collins
- Eric Wilton as Henry - Martin's Chauffeur
- Phil Dunham as J. Robert Slank

== Bibliography ==
- Philippa Gates. Detecting Women: Gender and the Hollywood Detective Film. SUNY Press, 2011.
