= Bonnie Scotland (film) =

1935 film by James W. Horne

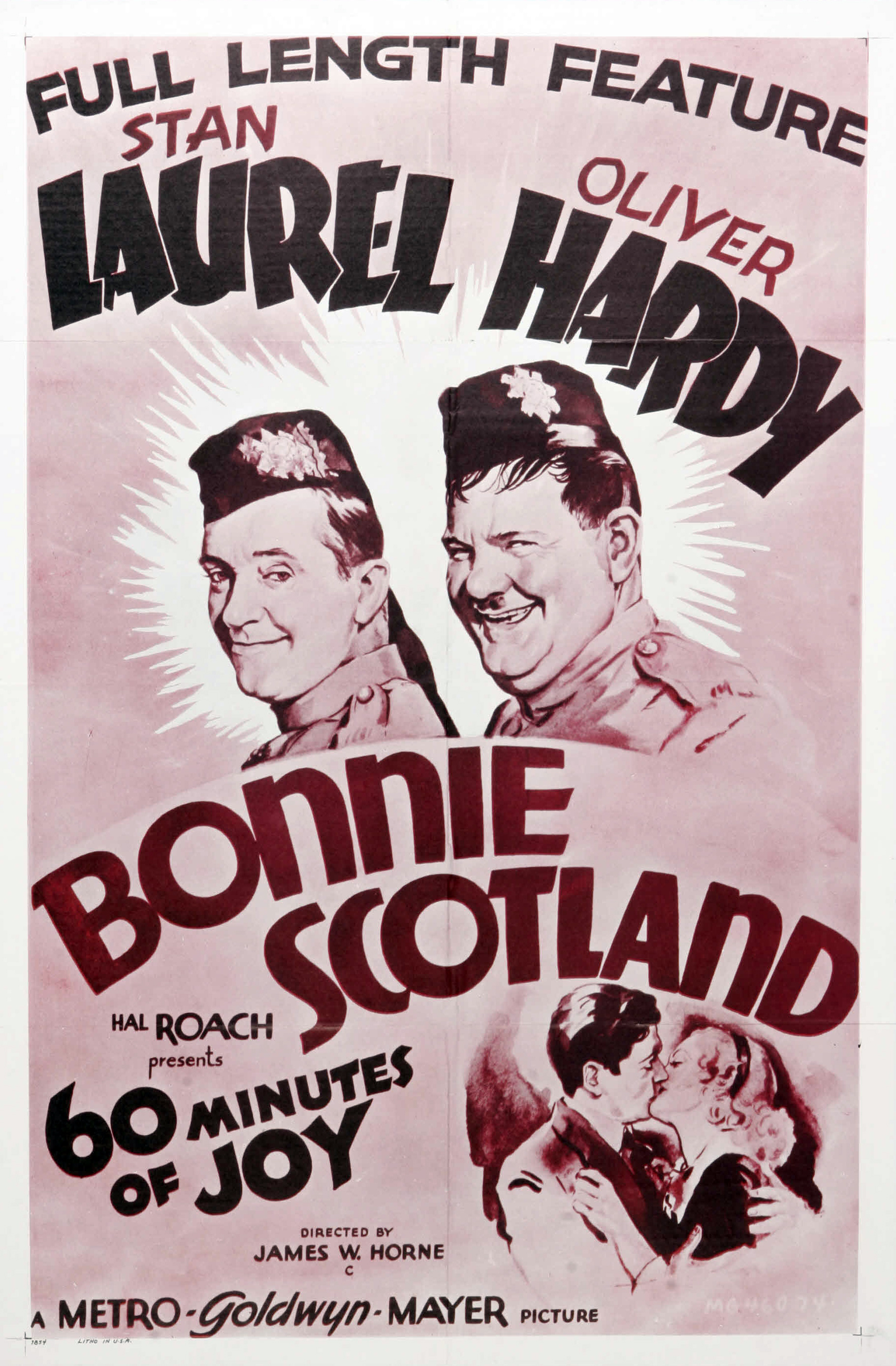
- Theatrical poster
- Directed by: James W. Horne
- Written by: Frank Butler; Jefferson Moffitt; Stan Laurel; Albert Austin; Wilson Collison; James W. Horne; Charley Rogers
- Produced by: Stan Laurel; Hal Roach
- Starring: Stan Laurel; Oliver Hardy; June Lang; William Janney; Anne Grey; Vernon Steele; James Finlayson
- Cinematography: Art Lloyd; Walter Lundin
- Edited by: Bert Jordan
- Music by: Marvin Hatley; Leroy Shield
- Production company: Hal Roach Studios
- Distributed by: Metro-Goldwyn-Mayer
- Release date: August 23, 1935
- Running time: 80 minutes
- Country: United States
- Language: English

Bonnie Scotland is a 1935 American film directed by James W. Horne and starring Laurel and Hardy. It was produced by Hal Roach for Hal Roach Studios. Although the film begins in Scotland, a large part of the action is set in British India.

== Plot ==
Upon absconding from incarceration with only a week left to serve, Laurel and Hardy embark on a journey to Scotland clandestinely aboard a cattle boat. Stan, assuming the alias "Stanley McLaurel," harbors the belief that he is the rightful heir to his grandfather's substantial fortune. However, his inheritance merely comprises a set of bagpipes and a snuff container, the latter of which propels Hardy off an antiquated bridge while attempting to demonstrate its usage.

In their boarding house, Laurel exchanges their overcoats for a sizable fish intended for dinner. However, calamity ensues as the fish rapidly diminishes in size, Hardy's attire is singed beyond repair, and their endeavor to conceal the incriminating stove results in eviction and confiscation of their belongings for unpaid rent. Following an advertisement for a tailor's services, a misdirected floor choice leads them to unwittingly enlist in a Scottish regiment of the British Army, subsequently transporting them to India.

Their escapades in India are marked by recurrent clashes with the stern Sergeant Major and their involvement in aiding their comrade Alan in reuniting with his beloved Lorna McLaurel, Stan's cousin. The local terrorist threat posed by Khan Mir Jutra prompts a perilous decoy mission to the palace, with Colonel MacGregor orchestrating a coordinated assault from an alternative direction. Inadvertently coerced into the mission, Laurel and Hardy remain oblivious to the impending danger until handed pistols and instructed to enact suicide.

However, Hardy's botched attempt results in the collapse of a colossal chandelier, followed by a chaotic pursuit culminating in a courtyard of beehives. This unforeseen encounter incites pandemonium among the terrorists and their own regiment, ultimately thwarting Khan Mir Jutra's nefarious intentions.

== Cast ==
- Oliver Hardy as Ollie Hardy
- Stan Laurel as Stanley MacLaurel
- June Lang as Lorna MacLaurel
- William Janney as Allan Douglas
- Anne Grey as Lady Violet Ormsby
- Vernon Steele as Colonel Gregor McGregor
- James Finlayson as Sergeant Major Finlayson
- David Torrence as Mr Miggs
- Maurice Black as Khan Mir Jutra
- Daphne Pollard as Millie (the maid)
- Mary Gordon as Mrs. Bickerdike
- Lionel Belmore as The blacksmith (part cut to a cameo in release print)
- Claude King as General Fletcher
- David Clyde as Highlander

== Reception ==
Leonard Maltin stated, "Plot sometimes gets in the way of L&H, but their material is well up to par ... " Leslie Halliwell wrote, "Generally disappointing star comedy which still contains excellent sequences when it is not vainly trying to preserve interest in a boring plot. An obvious parody on The Lives of a Bengal Lancer, released earlier that year; Scotland has almost nothing to do with it."
