= Sign of the Wolf =

1941 film by Howard Bretherton

- Theatrical release poster
- Directed by: Howard Bretherton
- Screenplay by: Elizabeth Sutphin; Edmond Kelso
- Based on: That Spot by Jack London
- Produced by: Paul Malvern
- Starring: Michael Whalen; Grace Bradley; Darryl Hickman; Mantan Moreland; Louise Beavers; Wade Crosby
- Cinematography: Fred Jackman Jr.
- Edited by: Jack Ogilvie
- Production company: Monogram Pictures
- Distributed by: Monogram Pictures
- Release date: March 25, 1941
- Running time: 69 minutes
- Country: United States
- Language: English

Sign of the Wolf is a 1941 American adventure film directed by Howard Bretherton and written by Elizabeth Sutphin and Edmond Kelso. The film stars Michael Whalen, Grace Bradley, Darryl Hickman, Mantan Moreland, Louise Beavers and Wade Crosby. The film was released on March 25, 1941, by Monogram Pictures.

== Cast ==
- Michael Whalen as Rod Freeman
- Grace Bradley as Judy Weston
- Darryl Hickman as Billy Freeman
- Mantan Moreland as Ben
- Louise Beavers as Beulah
- Wade Crosby as Mort Gunning
- Tony Paton as Red Fargo
- Joseph E. Bernard as Hank
- Ed Brady as Jules
- Eddie Kane as Jack Martin
- Brandon Hurst as Dr. Morton
