= Larceny on the Air =

1937 film by Irving Pichel

- Directed by: Irving Pichel
- Written by: Richard English; Endre Bohem; Richard English
- Produced by: Nat Levine; Sol C. Siegel
- Starring: Robert Livingston; Grace Bradley; Willard Robertson
- Cinematography: Jack A. Marta
- Edited by: Edward Mann
- Music by: Harry Grey
- Production company: Republic Pictures
- Distributed by: Republic Pictures
- Release date: January 11, 1937
- Running time: 67 minutes
- Country: United States
- Language: English

Larceny on the Air is a 1937 American thriller film directed by Irving Pichel and starring Robert Livingston, Grace Bradley and Willard Robertson. It was produced and distributed by Republic Pictures.

== Plot summary ==
Dr. Lawrence Baxter runs a medical-themed radio show and frequently denounces the phony radium-based "medicine" being sold by Ronald Kennedy. After one of his patients is kidnapped by Kennedy's thugs, Baxter teams up with the police, and pretends to join Kennedy's business to gain evidence of criminal activity.

== Cast ==
- Robert Livingston as Dr. Lawrence Baxter
- Grace Bradley as Jean Sterling
- Willard Robertson as Inspector "Mac" McDonald
- Pierre Watkin as Kennedy
- Smiley Burnette as Jimmy
- Granville Bates as Prof. Rexford Sterling
- William Newell as Andrews
- Byron Foulger as Pete Andorka
- Wilbur Mack as F. J. Thompson
- Matty Fain as Burke
- Josephine Whittell as Nurse Nelson
- Charles Timblin as Swain
- Gonzalo Meroño as Richard Steward
- Billy Griffith as Kellogg
- William Hopper as Announcer
- Frank Du Frane as Golden
- Florence Gill as Spinster
