= Sitting on the Moon =

1936 film by Ralph Staub

- Directed by: Ralph Staub
- Written by: Raymond L. Schrock (screenplay); Rex Taylor (adaptation) & Sidney Sutherland (adaptation); Julian Field (original story)
- Produced by: Nat Levine (producer); Albert E. Levoy (associate producer)
- Cinematography: Ernest Miller
- Edited by: Ernest J. Nims
- Distributed by: Republic Pictures (US); British Lion Films (UK)
- Release date: September 11, 1936
- Running time: 53 minutes (US edited version); 66 minutes (US)
- Country: United States
- Language: English

Sitting on the Moon is a 1936 American musical film directed by Ralph Staub and released by Republic Pictures.

== Plot ==
Songwriter Danny West wakes up with an unknown woman in a taxi outside the film studio Regent Pictures Inc. where he works. He remembers little from the night before. The woman is still asleep and Danny asks the driver to drop her off where they picked her up.

Danny and songwriting colleague Mike are tasked with delivering a song to studio executive Tucker.

Actress Polly Blair once walked out on Tucker, and now he will not even hire her for the chorus. Polly's friend Mattie offers moral support. Danny recognize Polly from when she chose his and Mike's song "Who Am I" for her movie Fugitive Princess. The song became a hit and was Danny's big break. Danny writes the song "Sitting on the Moon" for Polly and she performs it with Charlie Lane and his ensemble.

Right before Danny and Polly's engagement party, Danny and Mike are fired from the film studio. Charlie has signed with a broadcaster from New York and wants Polly to come along, but she turns down the offer because she wants to stay with Danny. The woman from the taxi, Blossom, shows up at the party and says that she and Danny got married that night. She leaves, and soon thereafter a heartbroken Polly and Mattie leave too.

Blossom notifies Danny that she will accept a divorce in exchange for $10,000 in cash. Mike invites Danny to come along to New York, but Danny declines.

Polly is successful on New York radio's Happy Go Lucky Hour and generates record sales. Mike finds out that Charlie, who signed Polly to him, is making $3,500 but only paying Polly $100.

Danny travels to New York, hits Charlie, and Charlie raises Polly's salary to $1,000 a week. Polly is excited to hear that Danny is in town. Frank sends Danny a newspaper clip of Blossom reading she has "eleven husbands" in a racket she runs with the taxi driver. Against the show owner's expressed wishes, Polly interrupts her live show to sing "Lost in My Dreams", which Danny wrote for her. Charlie refuses to conduct and walks out, and Polly starts singing a cappella. Three musicians hired by Danny join her, and then the ensemble follows. The show owner invites Polly to stay on the show and asks Danny to write songs for her.

== Cast ==
- Roger Pryor as Danny West
- Grace Bradley as Polly Blair
- William Newell as Mike
- Pert Kelton as Mattie
- Henry Kolker as Worthington
- Henry Wadsworth as Charlie Lane
- Joyce Compton as Blossom Dawn
- Pierre Watkin as Tucker
- William Janney as Young Husband
- June Martel as Young Wife
- The Theodores as Themselves (singing group)
- Jimmy Ray as Feature Dancer
- Harvey Clark as Hotel Manager
- George Cooper as Jim Daggett, Taxi Driver

== Soundtrack ==
- Roger Pryor - "Sitting on the Moon" (written by Sidney D. Mitchell and Sam H. Stept)
- Grace Bradley with orchestra - "Sitting on the Moon"
- Roger Pryor - "Lost in My Dreams" (written by Sidney D. Mitchell and Sam H. Stept)
- Roger Pryor - "How Am I Doin' With You" (written by Sidney D. Mitchell and Sam H. Stept)
- Grace Bradley, with Roger Pryor on piano - "Who Am I?" (written by Sidney D. Mitchell and Sam H. Stept)
- Roger Pryor - "Theme from Tannhauser" (performed as a rag) (music by Richard Wagner)
