= Mountain Music (film) =

1937 film by Robert Florey

- Directed by: Robert Florey
- Written by: Charles Lederer; Jack Moffitt; Duke Atteberry
- Produced by: Benjamin Glazer
- Cinematography: Karl Struss
- Edited by: Eda Warren
- Distributed by: Paramount Pictures
- Release date: June 18, 1937
- Running time: 76 minutes
- Country: United States
- Language: English

Mountain Music is a 1937 American comedy-musical film directed by Robert Florey. Paramount reunited Raye and Burns from their pairing in Waikiki Wedding from earlier in the year. The plot, rooted in Burns' comic hillbilly radio persona, involves a longstanding feud between two country families of Monotony, Arkansas and an amnesia-prone groom.

== Cast ==
- Bob Burns as Bob Burnside
- Martha Raye as Mary Beamish
- John Howard as Ardinger Burnside
- Terry Walker as Lobelia Sheppard
- Rufe Davis as Ham Sheppard
- George "Gabby" Hayes as Granpappy Burnside
- Spencer Charters as Justice of the Peace Sharody
- Charles Timblin as Shep Sheppard
- Jan Duggan as Ma Burnside
- Olin Howland as Pappy Burnside
- Fuzzy Knight as Amos Burnside
- Wally Vernon as Odette Potta
- Cliff Clark as Medicine Show Proprietor
- Goodee Montgomery as Alice, Potts Showgirl
- Rita La Roy as Mrs. Hamilton B. Lovelace
- Ellen Drew as Helen
- uncredited bit players include Ward Bond, Virginia Dabney, Estelle Etterre, Florence Gill, Arthur Hohl, Priscilla Moran, Paul Newlan, and Glenn Strange.

== Reception ==
Critic Mae Tinée of the Chicago Tribune wrote: "Bob Burns is kinda sweet and Martha Raye is kinda likable and their picture is kinda lousy. I wish somebody would write a real story for this nice Burns person! He's made of too good stuff to be sent rattling around the country in inferior vehicles. His present rattletrap is a burlesque on feudin' and feudists in the mountings [sic]. To keep from wedding his brother's gal, who is the darter of a foe and whom [sic] said long whiskered belligerent insists shall become the bride of Bob or ELSE, our hero runs away from there."
