= The Road to Glory (1936 film) =

1936 film by Howard Hawks

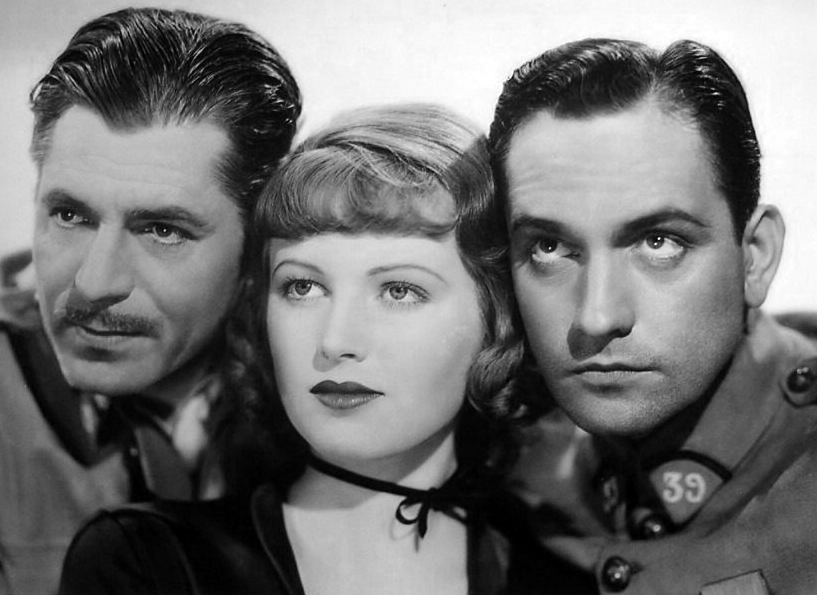
- Publicity still for film with Warner Baxter, June Lang, and Fredric March
- Directed by: Howard Hawks
- Screenplay by: Joel Sayre; William Faulkner
- Produced by: Darryl F. Zanuck
- Starring: Fredric March; Warner Baxter; Lionel Barrymore
- Cinematography: Gregg Toland
- Edited by: Edward Curtiss
- Music by: Louis Silvers
- Production company: Twentieth Century Fox
- Distributed by: Twentieth Century Fox
- Release date: September 4, 1936
- Running time: 103 minutes
- Country: United States
- Language: English
- Box office: $1 million

The Road to Glory is a 1936 American war drama film directed by Howard Hawks and starring Fredric March, Warner Baxter, Lionel Barrymore and June Lang, and produced by 20th Century Fox. It is a depiction of World War I trench warfare in France. It is vaguely inspired by Roland Dorgelès’ 1919 novel and Raymond Bernard’s 1932 film Les Croix de Bois (Wooden Crosses), though the film credits do not mention them.

== Plot ==
Set in France during World War I, a love triangle develops between a French commander who cares more for strategy than human life, a free-thinking officer who is appalled by his superior's decisions, and the nurse with whom both men fall in love.

== Cast ==
- Fredric March as Lieutenant Michel Denet
- Warner Baxter as Captain Paul La Roche
- Lionel Barrymore as Papa La Roche / Private Morin
- June Lang as Monique La Coste
- Gregory Ratoff as Russian Sergeant
- Victor Kilian as Tall Sergeant
- Paul Stanton as Captain
- John Qualen as Scared Soldier
- Julius Tannen as Lieutenant Tannen
- Theodore von Eltz as Major
- Paul Fix as Second Volunteer
- Leonid Kinskey as Soldier
- Jacques Lory as Courier
- Jacques Vanaire as Doctor
- Edythe Raynore as Nurse
- George Warrington as Jean Dulac
