= Ranny Weeks =

American orchestra leader, pianist (1906–1974)

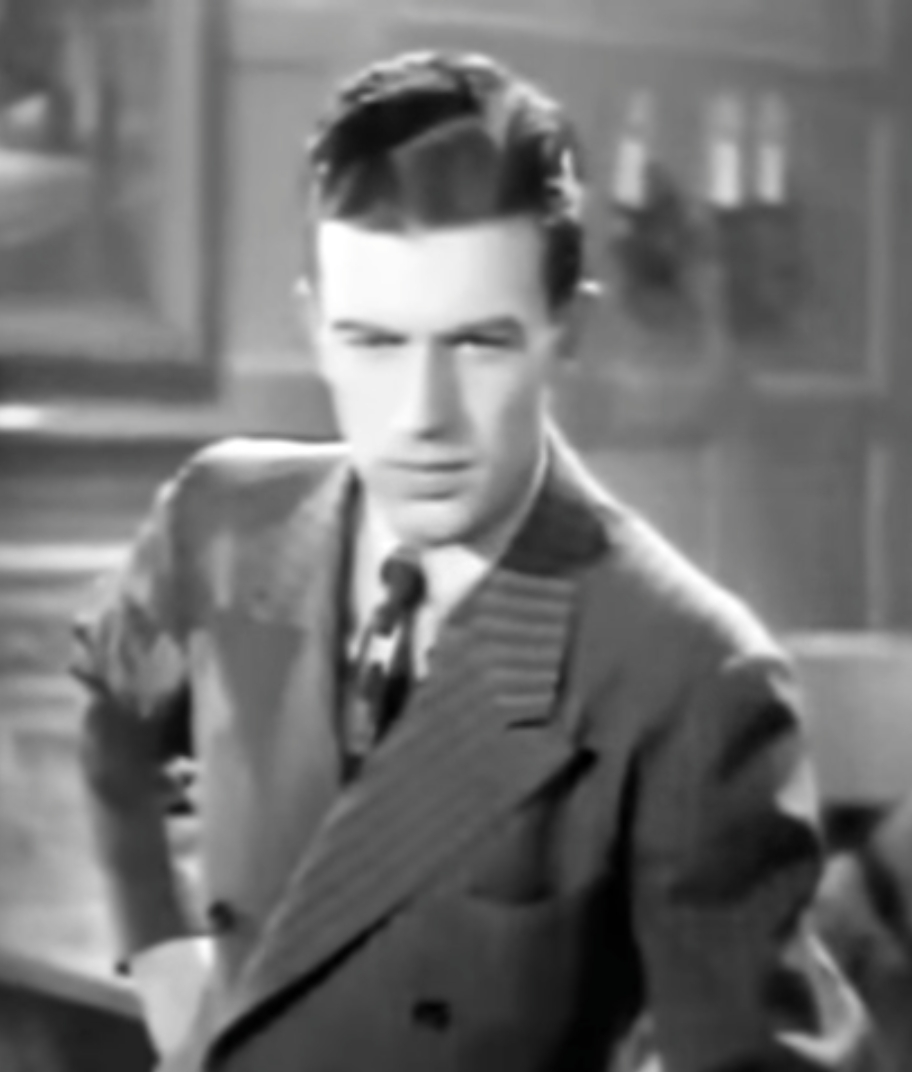
- Weeks in Bill Cracks Down (1937)
- Born: Randall Webster Weeks; February 25, 1907; Everett, Massachusetts, U.S.
- Died: April 26, 1979 (aged 72); Falmouth, Massachusetts, U.S.
- Occupations: Bandleader; naval officer; university administrator; actor
- Years active: 1928–1965

Randall Webster Weeks (February 25, 1907 – April 26, 1979) was an American bandleader, actor, naval commander, and university administrator.

== Early life ==
Weeks was born in 1907 in Everett, Massachusetts. His father, William E. Weeks, was a politician who served as Mayor of Everett and was a member of the Massachusetts House of Representatives. Weeks attended Everett High School and played quarterback for the school's football team. However, his family moved to Reading, Massachusetts, before he finished school. After graduating from Reading High School, Weeks attended Boston University's Business and Law schools, but left in 1929 due to a lack of funds.

== Music ==
In 1928, Weeks began spending his summers singing and playing piano at a coffee house in Hyannis, Massachusetts, to help pay for school. After leaving school he joined Bert Lowe's Orchestra and later formed his own band. In 1929 and 1930, Weeks recorded as a vocalist with the Colonial Club Orchestra. In 1930, Ranny Weeks and his Red Cross Aristocrats were given a weekly show on WBZ radio. From 1930 to 1932, Weeks led the I. J. Fox Fur Trappers Orchestra, which was heard twice a week on WEEI. On March 13, 1931, Ranny Weeks & His Orchestra recorded four songs for Brunswick Records. In 1934 he was hired to conduct a permanent orchestra in the RKO Boston Theatre.

== Acting ==
In 1932, Weeks made his film debut in It Happened in Paris, a musical remake of The Two Orphans. In 1937, Herbert Yates signed Weeks to a contract with Republic Pictures. He appeared in ten films for the company, including a starring role in Bill Cracks Down.

== Return to Massachusetts ==
After his contract with Republic ended, Weeks and his family moved to Newtonville, Massachusetts. He went into the advertising business and resumed his career as a bandleader. In 1942, Weeks was appointed co-chairman of the Massachusetts Committee on Public Safety's radio division, which supervised all programming on every radio station in the state. He then served four years as an administrative officer in the United States Navy during and following World War II. From 1947 to 1949, Weeks and his Orchestra spent the summer playing the Sheraton Roof in Boston. In 1950, Weeks was a Republican candidate for Massachusetts Secretary of the Commonwealth. He finished second in a seven candidate primary with 19% of the vote to Russell A. Wood's 26%. Weeks returned to the Navy during the Korean War. From 1951 to 1954 he was in charge of recruitment in the Philadelphia district. In 1954, Weeks was named Boston University's executive alumni secretary. In 1965 he was named special assistant to the vice president for university affairs. He also served as executive director of the B.U. Law School Alumni Association. After retiring from B.U., Weeks moved to Falmouth, Massachusetts. He died on April 26, 1979, after a short illness.
