= Redhead (1934 film) =

1934 film directed by Melville Brown

- Directed by: Melville Brown
- Written by: Betty Burbridge
- Based on: the novel, Redhead by Vera Brown
- Produced by: Dorothy Davenport
- Starring: Bruce Cabot; Grace Bradley; Regis Toomey
- Cinematography: Ira Morgan
- Production company: Monogram Pictures
- Release date: November 1, 1934 (US)
- Running time: 77 minutes
- Country: United States
- Language: English

Redhead is a 1934 American drama film directed by Melville Brown and starring Bruce Cabot, Grace Bradley, and Regis Toomey. It was released on November 1, 1934.

== Cast list ==
- Bruce Cabot as Ted Brown
- Grace Bradley as Dale Carter
- Regis Toomey as Scoop
- Berton Churchill as Mr. Brown
- LeRoy Mason as Pretty Boy
- Monte Carter as Donterini
- George Humbert as Pasquale
- Rita Campagna as Mrs. Pasquale
- Ed Brady as Joe
- Bess Stafford as Landlady

== See also ==
- Redhead (1941 film)
