= Let's Talk It Over =

1934 film by Kurt Neumann

- Directed by: Kurt Neumann
- Written by: Dore Schary; Lewis R. Foster; John Meehan Jr.
- Produced by: B.F. Zeidman
- Starring: Chester Morris; Mae Clarke; Frank Craven
- Cinematography: Charles J. Stumar
- Production company: Universal Pictures
- Distributed by: Universal Pictures
- Release date: June 1, 1934
- Running time: 68 minutes
- Country: United States
- Language: English

Let's Talk It Over is a 1934 American pre-Code comedy-drama film directed by Kurt Neumann and starring Chester Morris, Mae Clarke and Frank Craven.

== Plot summary ==
A young sailor saves a woman from drowning. The woman turns out to be a rich heiress; unfortunately for the sailor, she was only pretending to be drowning so that another young man she had her eye on would save her.

== Partial cast ==
- Chester Morris as Mike McGann
- Mae Clarke as Pat Rockland
- Frank Craven as Mr. Rockland
- John Warburton as Alex Winters
- Irene Ware as Sandra
- Andy Devine as Gravel
- Russ Brown as Bill
- Anderson Lawler as Peter
- Goodee Montgomery as Helen Wray
- Douglas Fowley as Sailor Jones
- Jane Darwell as Mrs. O'Keefe
- Willard Robertson as Dr. Preston
- Frank Reicher as Richards
- Henry Armetta as Tony
- Otis Harlan as Purser

== Bibliography ==
- Dick, Bernard F. City of Dreams: The Making and Remaking of Universal Pictures. University Press of Kentucky, 2015.
