= Grace Bradley =

American actress (1913–2010)

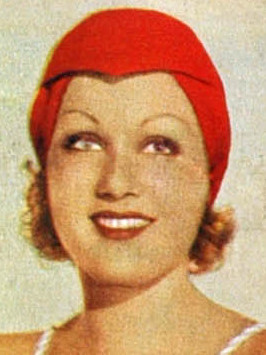
- Bradley on cover of Argentine sports magazine, 1936
- Born: September 21, 1913; Brooklyn, New York, United States
- Died: September 21, 2010 (aged 97); Dana Point, California, United States
- Other name: Grace Bradley Boyd
- Occupations: Actress; singer; dancer
- Years active: 1930–1954
- Spouse(s): William Boyd (m.1937-1972; his death)

Grace Bradley (September 21, 1913 – September 21, 2010) was an American film actress who was active in Hollywood during the 1930s.

== Early life ==
Bradley was born in Brooklyn and was an only child. As a child she took piano lessons and at the age of six gave her first recital. She attended the Eastman School of Music near Rochester, New York where, at the age of 12, she was awarded a scholarship. Originally, she had wanted to become a professional pianist. While in school she took dance lessons and played piano.

As one obituary noted, she "played the piano, sang and danced, on stage and in nightclubs, from an early age to help support her widowed mother."

Her grandfather had wanted her to be educated in Berlin, Germany so that she could receive a more formal education but a Broadway producer discovered her during one of her dance recitals and hired her for a professional show.

On December 22, 1930, she made her Broadway debut at New York's Hammerstein Theatre in Ballyhoo of 1930. Her next stage appearance came one year later at The Music Box Theater in The Third Little Show. Soon Bradley found herself working in various New York nightclubs and theatres. In March 1933, she appeared in Strike Me Pink at the Majestic Theater. She left the show after deciding to give Hollywood a try.

== Hollywood ==
Although she made one film in 1932, her film career did not gather steam until she starred in the film Too Much Harmony (1933), which provided her "first film credit". Beginning in 1933 she was under contract to Paramount Pictures and reportedly took home $150 per week.

Her typical roles were described in an obituary: "From 1933 to 1943, she appeared in dozens of quickly made second features, often cast as what were termed 'good-time girls,' as distinct from good girls, sometimes with invented ooh-la-la French names." In the 1930s, she became one of the period's most popular musical stars.

== Personal life and post-career activities ==
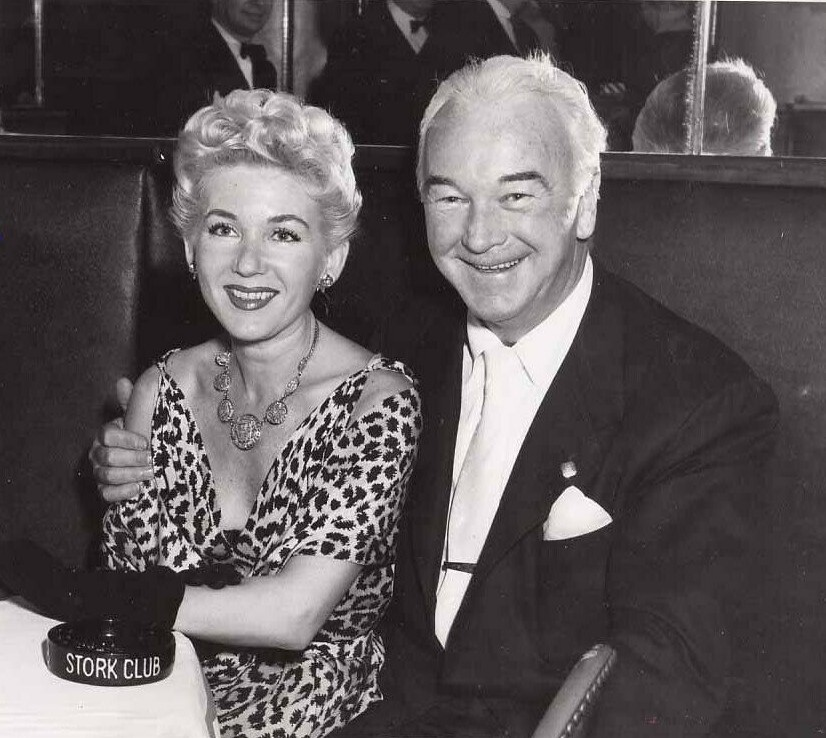
Grace Bradley and William Boyd visit the Stork Club (1954)

In May 1937, Bradley agreed to a blind date and met Hopalong Cassidy star William Boyd. The two of them hit it off so well that they married the next month. The union was happy but childless. In the 1940s, Bradley's star began to wane and, in 1943, she starred in her last big role in Taxi, Mister. Following this film, Bradley had officially played out her Paramount contract, and she spent the remainder of the 1940s alongside her husband, traveling around the country with him helping promote his cowboy image. She made one more film appearance, an uncredited cameo role in Tournament of Roses (1954).

Following Boyd's death on September 12, 1972, Bradley retired from the entertainment world, but still continued to do things to help keep Boyd's memory alive. She also endured years of fighting for the legal rights to her late husband's 66 "Hopalong Cassidy" features. With her acting career behind her, she devoted her time to volunteer work at the Laguna Beach Hospital where her husband had spent his final days.

== Death ==
Grace Bradley Boyd died on her 97th birthday in 2010. Two days later, private services were held at Forest Lawn Memorial Park in Glendale, California, where she was interred with her husband in the Great Mausoleum, Sanctuary of Sacred Promise.

== Filmography ==
- Too Much Harmony (1933) - Verne La Mond
- The Way to Love (1933) - Sunburned Lady
- Girl Without a Room (1933) - Nada
- Six of a Kind (1934) - Goldie
- Wharf Angel (1934) - Saloon Girl
- Come on Marines! (1934) - JoJo La Verne
- She Made Her Bed (1934) - Eve Richards
- The Cat's-Paw (1934) - Dolores Doce
- Redhead (1934) - Dale Carter
- The Gilded Lily (1935) - Daisy
- Stolen Harmony (1935) - Jean Loring
- Old Man Rhythm (1935) - Marion Beecher
- Two-Fisted (1935) - Marie
- Rose of the Rancho (1936) - Flossie
- Anything Goes (1936) - Bonnie LeTour
- Dangerous Waters (1936) - Joan Marlowe
- Thirteen Hours by Air (1936) - Trixie La Brey
- F-Man (1936) - Evelyn
- Three Cheers for Love (1936) - Eve Bronson
- Sitting on the Moon (1936) - Polly Blair
- Don't Turn 'Em Loose (1936) - Grace Forbes
- Larceny on the Air (1937) - Jean Sterling
- O.H.M.S. (1937) - Jean Burdett
- Roaring Timber (1937) - Kay MacKinley
- Wake Up and Live (1937) - Jean Roberts
- Blazing Glory (1937)
- It's All Yours (1937) - Constance Marlowe
- The Big Broadcast of 1938 (1938) - Grace Fielding
- Romance on the Run (1938) - Lily Lamont
- Roaring Timber (1938)
- The Invisible Killer (1939) - Sue Walker
- Sign of the Wolf (1941) - Judy Weston
- The Hard-Boiled Canary (1941) - Madie Duvalie
- Brooklyn Orchid (1942) - Sadie McGuerin
- The McGuerins from Brooklyn (1943) - Sadie McGuerin
- Taxi, Mister (1943)
