= Goodee Montgomery =

American actress

- Born: Virginia Lawhead; March 28, 1906; St. Joseph, Missouri, United States
- Died: June 5, 1978 (aged 72); Los Angeles, California, United States
- Other name: Virginia Montgomery
- Occupation: Actress
- Years active: 1926 - 1937 (film)
- Spouse: Frank Burgess McDonald (1934 - ?)

Goodee Montgomery (born Virginia Lawhead; 1906–1978) was an American actress and musician. She was the niece of the actor David C. Montgomery. She also performed in vaudeville.

== Career ==
Montgomery was born Virginia Lawhead in St. Joseph, Missouri. Her father, Rex Lawhead, managed a theater in Decatur, Illinois. Her parents divorced when she was 15 years old. Her stage name was a combination of a pet name her uncle used for her, Goodee, and her mother's maiden name, Montgomery.

Montgomery sang and played banjo and ukulele. She also arranged, recorded, and made broadcasts for the Victor Company in addition to writing songs and writing books about the ukulele. As a writer, Montgomery used the pen name Donna McDonald.

On Broadway, Montgomery portrayed Hotsie in Piggy (1927). Montgomery and Dorothy Stone formed an act in the early 1930s, following in the tradition of Montgomery's uncle and Stone's father, who had an act together.

Montgomery married director Frank Burgess McDonald in 1934. She became a successful watercolor artist after she injured her spine in 1940 and cut short her career in acting.

== Selected filmography ==
- Charlie Chan Carries On (1931)
- Let's Talk It Over (1934)
- Stolen Sweets (1934)
- Stolen Harmony (1935)
- Beware of Ladies (1936)
- Mountain Music (1937)

== Bibliography ==
- Everett Aaker. George Raft: The Films. McFarland, 2013.
