= Leith Stevens =

American music composer and conductor (1909-1970)

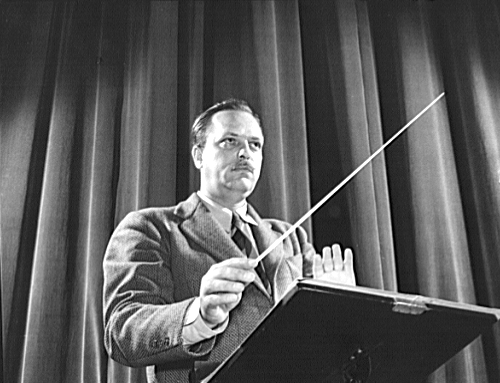
Leith Stevens conducts.

Leith Stevens (September 13, 1909 – July 23, 1970) was an American music composer and conductor of radio and film scores.

== Early life and education ==
Leith Stevens was born in Mount Moriah, Missouri, He was a child prodigy pianist who accompanied operatic vocalist and early audio recording artist Madame Schumann-Heink.

During World War II Stevens worked as radio director for the Southwest Pacific Area for the U.S. Office of War Information. He was musical director of the War Production Board (WPB) series Three Thirds of a Nation presented on Wednesdays on the NBC Blue Network.

== Career ==
As early as 1934, Stevens was active in radio broadcasting. Radio highlights in an April 28, 1934, newspaper listed "Romantic songs have been chosen by Charles Carlile, tenor, for his broadcast with Leith Stevens' orchestra over WBBM at 5:45."

Stevens worked as an arranger for CBS radio, and his numerous radio credits over several decades include The Abbott and Costello Show, Academy Award Theater, Action Eighty, American School for the Air, Arch Oboler's Plays, Big Town, The Black Book, CBS Radio Workshop (later called Columbia Workshop), The Doctor Fights, Encore Theater, Escape, The Free Company Rogue's Gallery, The Burns and Allen Show, The Judge, Lights Out, Men Against Death, The Miracle of America, No Help Wanted, Request Performance, Saturday Night Swing Club, Suspense and radio crime melodrama Yours Truly, Johnny Dollar.

=== Films ===
Stevens' piano concerto in C minor was his first work to be used in cinema, for the 1947 Hollywood film Night Song. In the film's plot, the concerto was the work of a fictional composer played by Dana Andrews. Arthur Rubinstein played the concerto on the piano, accompanied by the New York Philharmonic, conducted by Eugene Ormandy. The music is tonal, with a horizontal (as distinct from vertical) compositional approach, with sophisticated harmonies and challenging virtuoso passages for the piano. The work is influenced by Delius, Rachmaninov, and Gershwin, and is both impressionist and romantic.

He also co-wrote the Oscar-nominated title song from the 1956 movie Julie starring Doris Day. His other film scores included the following:

- Syncopation (1942)
- Night Song (1948)
- All My Sons (1948)
- Feudin', Fussin' and A-Fightin' (1948)
- Larceny (1948)
- Not Wanted (1949)
- The Great Rupert (1950)
- Destination Moon (1950)
- The Sun Sets at Dawn (1950)
- No Questions Asked (1951)
- When Worlds Collide (1951)
- The Atomic City (1952)
- Storm Over Tibet (1952)
- Beware, My Lovely (1952)
- Eight Iron Men (1952)
- The Hitch-Hiker (1953)
- The Glass Wall (1953)
- The War of the Worlds (1953)
- The Bigamist (1953)
- The Wild One (1953)
- Private Hell 36 (1954)
- Crashout (1955)
- The Treasure of Pancho Villa (1955)
- The Scarlet Hour (1956)
- World Without End (1956)
- Julie (1956)
- The Garment Jungle (1957)
- Lizzie (1957)
- Ride Out for Revenge (1957)
- Eighteen and Anxious (1957)
- The Green-Eyed Blonde (1957)
- Seven Guns to Mesa (1958)
- Violent Road (1958)
- Bullwhip (1958)
- The Gun Runners (1958)
- But Not for Me (1959)
- The Gene Krupa Story (1959)
- Hell to Eternity (1960)
- The Interns (1962)
- A New Kind of Love (1963)
- The Night of the Grizzly (1966)
- Smoky (1966)
- Chuka (1967)
- Assault on the Wayne (1971)

He also provided uncredited contributions to the Frank Capra film classic It's a Wonderful Life.

=== The James Dean Story ===
Stevens composed and conducted the music accompanying the film The James Dean Story. In 1957, Capitol Records released the eponymous album containing this music, and its anonymous sleeve notes state, "Here is the music direct from the soundtrack of The James Dean Story, a different kind of motion picture. This is a film in which there are no actors, there is no fiction. It is, instead, the story of a young man in search of himself - a story of a lonely boy growing into a lonely manhood, of a quest for discovery and meaning, of a great talent and zest for creative expression, and of a tragic end which brought more questions than answers." The sleeve notes continue, "The life of James Dean is presented on the screen through the means of a new technique - dramatic exploration of a still photograph. Together with tape recordings, existing motion picture material, and the people with whom he lived and worked, these photographs create the presence of the living character. If there are supporting roles in this picture, the parts must be credited to the people of Fairmount, Indiana, where Dean lived as a boy; to the nine million faces of New York City, where he struggled for recognition as an artist and as an individual; and to the men and women of Hollywood who shared in the development of his career."

The sleeve notes describe the music as "...unusual and exciting as the motion picture itself. Leith Stevens, the composer, captures a haunting reflection of the violent yet strangely understandable uncertainties of modern youth. Stevens, whose musical scores have distinguished such films as The Wild One, Private Hell 36, Destination Moon and Julie, describes the loneliness and frustrations, the fury and tenderness of James Dean's life and the world in which he moved. With his use of such instruments as the recorder, harmonica and bongo drums, and in his unique utilization of the jazz idiom, Leith Stevens produces music with dynamic personal identification, not only for James Dean, but for every boy who's ever worn a leather jacket and for every girl who's ever danced without her shoes. Stevens traces the development of Dean throughout his boyhood, his early rebellion against conventions, the discovery of his artistic abilities, and his failure to resolve his personal problems. “Who Am I?” depicts the young Dean groping for self-identification; “Lost Love” is a painful portrayal of a romance without a happy ending; and “Testing The Limits of Time” is a brilliant montage of the moods and actions which Dean experienced in his last few months. Tommy Sands, the nation's newest singing sensation, sings the theme song “Let Me Be Loved” by Jay Livingston and Ray Evans."

=== Television ===
Stevens' television work was extensive, including composing, arranging and conducting music for 36 television series, nearly two dozen from the 1950s through the late 1960s, including the haunting theme song for the CBS television show Climax!.. He was the Music Supervisor for six popular television series, including Mannix, Mission: Impossible, Mr. Novak, The Odd Couple, The Brady Bunch, The Immortal, and Love, American Style. Stevens scored episodes for:

Year	Title	Info	On CD?
1967	Hondo	Episode(s): "Massacre"	NO

== Personal life and death ==
Stevens died at the age of 60 years due to a heart attack after learning that his wife had died in a car accident.

== Discography ==
With Chet Baker and Bud Shank

- Theme Music from "The James Dean Story" (World Pacific, 1956)
