= The Great Rupert =

1950 film by Irving Pichel

- Film poster
- Directed by: Irving Pichel
- Written by: Ted Allen (story); László Vadnay
- Produced by: George Pal
- Starring: Jimmy Durante; Terry Moore; Tom Drake
- Cinematography: Lionel Lindon
- Edited by: Duke Goldstone
- Music by: Leith Stevens
- Production company: George Pal Productions
- Distributed by: Eagle-Lion Films
- Release date: March 1, 1950 (United States)
- Running time: 87 minutes
- Country: United States
- Language: English

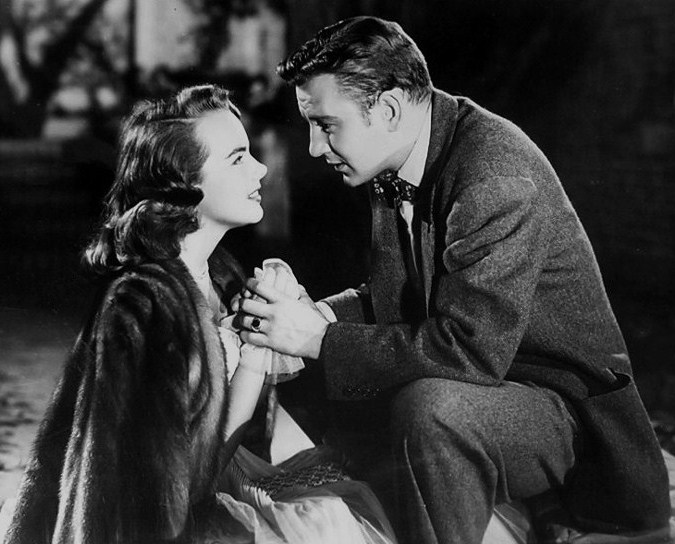
Terry Moore and Tom Drake

The Great Rupert is a 1950 comedy family film starring Jimmy Durante, Tom Drake and Terry Moore, produced by George Pal and directed by Irving Pichel. It is based on a story written by Ted Allan that has also been published as a children's book under the title Willie the Squowse.

The story revolves around a little animated squirrel who, with much charm, accidentally helps two economically distressed families overcome their obstacles.

== Plot ==
Joe Mahoney, a vaudeville performer who has fallen on hard times, has to leave his best friend and stage companion Rupert, a dancing squirrel, in the town. Rupert will have to fend for himself with the other squirrels and live in a tree. Mahoney had been renting a flat (attached to the Dingle house) from the Dingle family consisting of miserly father Frank, his wife and their son Pete, an aspiring composer. Frank recently learned a gold mine he'd invested in years earlier will start paying a return of $1500 a week. Frank begins cashing the checks and hiding the bills in a hollow baseboard.

A family of happy but impoverished acrobats, the Amendolas, move into Mahoney's former flat. Unsatisfied with tree life, Rupert also finds his way back to his old house. Rosalinda Amendola is in love with Pete Dingle.

Back in his old drey, Rupert makes space by clearing out Frank's hidden cache of money. As he throws the bills out, they float down into the Amendola house appearing to be sent from heaven in answer to Rosalinda's mother's prayers. Since Frank's gold mine pays weekly, he deposits money in the same spot every Thursday between 3-3:30 and this scene repeats itself many times.

The Amendolas spread their wealth around, investing in small businesses all over town. As citizens begins to gossip about the source of Amendola's money, taxmen and police converge on the Amendola house demanding answers right around the same time Frank is informed the gold mine is tapped out. While the IRS agent and police officers wait for the miracle money to appear, Rupert catches a lit cigarette and stores it in his drey where it starts a fire that engulfs the Dingle home.

Outside, during the ensuing blaze, the Amendolas are told by an inconsolable Frank about the hidden (presumed burned) cash and promise to help him rebuild the house. Rupert, having been saved by firefighters, goes back to the park where he is picked up by Mr. Mahoney and enlisted in a newly-minted circus act.

In the final scene, the families tour the rebuilt home and learn that an oil well Pete had invested in finally came in and his music ("Music for Orphaned Instruments") was purchased by a song publisher. It plays on a car radio as the group celebrates and Pete and Rosalinda embrace.

== Cast ==
- Jimmy Durante as Mr. Louie Amendola
- Terry Moore as Rosalinda Amendola
- Tom Drake as Peter 'Pete' Dingle
- Frank Orth as Mr. Frank Dingle
- Sara Haden as Mrs. Katie Dingle
- Queenie Smith as Mrs. Amendola
- Chick Chandler as Phil Davis
- Jimmy Conlin as Joe Mahoney
- Rupert, an animated squirrel
- Hugh Sanders as Mulligan
- Don Beddoe as Mr. Haggerty
- Candy Candido as Molineri - Florist
- Clancy Cooper as Police Lt. Saunders
- Harold Goodwin as Callahan - F.B.I. Man
- Frank Cady as Mr. Taney - Tax Investigator
- Irving Pichel as Puzzled Pedestrian (uncredited)

== Production ==
In 1949, producer George Pal, who had formerly overseen animated shorts, convinced the independent Eagle-Lion Films to cofinance a two-picture deal with him. These films would be The Great Rupert and Destination Moon.

The film was originally known as Money, Money, Money and was based on a story by Ted Allen purchased by Pal in June 1948. It was adapted by Laszlo Vadnay. Filming started at General Service Studio on June 20, 1949. At one stage, the film was called The Great Amandola; at another, it was Rupert II.

Pal's stop-motion animation used in creating the illusion of the dancing squirrel was so realistic that he received many inquiries about where he had located a trained squirrel.

== Reception ==
In a contemporary review for The New York Times, critic Bosley Crowther wrote:

"The Great Rupert" ... may not be the year's most humorous film—and film it is, incidentally; not an act on the accompanying vaudeville bill—nor is it the last word in slickness, so far as script and production are concerned. But within its acknowledged limitations of the modest, low-budget comedy, it is a wholly ingratiating item. ... To be sure, Irving Pichel's direction of this George Pal production (for Eagle-Lion) is a little stiff and vaguely amateurish. The whole thing looks as though it were filmed and edited within the time that might usually be devoted to the making of a short. But there is a wholesome ingenuousness about it—a brisk enthusiasm—that makes it unimpeachable. Talk about good, cheap "family pictures": "The Great Rupert" is definitely one."

== Home video ==
In 1978, The Great Rupert entered the public domain when the 28-year copyright period lapsed and the copyright was not renewed. As is typical with public-domain films, The Great Rupert has been issued many times in VHS and DVD format with widely varying quality.

In 2003, 20th Century Fox and Legend Films angered many fans of classic films by releasing a colorized version of the film under the title A Christmas Wish. The DVD includes an audio commentary track by Terry Moore.

RiffTrax spoofed the film with running commentary by Mystery Science Theater 3000 alumni Mary Jo Pehl and Bridget Nelson on December 19, 2025.

== See also ==
- List of films in the public domain in the United States
