= Stolen Harmony =

1935 film by Alfred L. Werker

- Directed by: Alfred L. Werker
- Written by: Claude Binyon; Lewis R. Foster; Leon Gordon
- Produced by: Albert Lewis
- Starring: George Raft; Ben Bernie; Grace Bradley
- Cinematography: Harry Fischbeck
- Edited by: Otho Lovering
- Music by: John Leipold
- Production company: Paramount Pictures
- Distributed by: Paramount Pictures
- Release date: April 20, 1935
- Running time: 80 minutes
- Country: United States
- Language: English

Stolen Harmony is a 1935 American crime film directed by Alfred L. Werker and starring George Raft, Ben Bernie and Grace Bradley. It is a semi-musical, featuring Big Band numbers. It was produced and distributed by Paramount Pictures.

== Plot ==
A saxophone-player/dancer joins a Big Band upon his release from jail.

== Cast ==
- George Raft as Ray Angelo
- Ben Bernie as Jack Conrad
- Grace Bradley as Jean Loring
- Iris Adrian as Sunny Verne
- Lloyd Nolan as Chesty Burrage
- Goodee Montgomery as Lil Davis
- Charles Arnt as Clem Walters
- Purv Pullen as Little Nell (uncredited)
- Ruth Clifford As Nurse (uncredited)
- Jane Wyman as Chorus Girl (uncredited)
- Bess Flowers as Musician (uncredited)
- Carol Holloway As 6 Children members (uncredited)
- Fred Toones as Henry (uncredited)
- William Cagney as "Schoolboy" (lookalike brother of James Cagney)

== Production ==
The film was based on an original story by Leon Gordon and was announced in December 1934. From the beginning it was envisioned as a vehicle for George Raft and bandleader Ben Bernie.
