= Redhead (1941 film) =

1941 film directed by Edward L. Cahn

- Directed by: Edward L. Cahn
- Written by: Conrad Seiler; Dorothy Davenport
- Based on: Redhead by Vera Brown
- Produced by: I.E. Chadwick
- Starring: Johnny Downs; June Lang; Eric Blore
- Cinematography: André Barlatier
- Production company: I.E. Chadwick Productions
- Distributed by: Monogram Pictures
- Release date: May 21, 1941
- Running time: 65 minutes
- Country: United States
- Language: English

Redhead is a 1941 American comedy film directed by Edward L. Cahn and starring Johnny Downs, June Lang, and Eric Blore.

== Cast ==
- Johnny Downs as Ted Brown
- June Lang as Dale Carter
- Eric Blore as Scoop

== See also ==
- Redhead (1934 film)
