= June Lang =

American actress

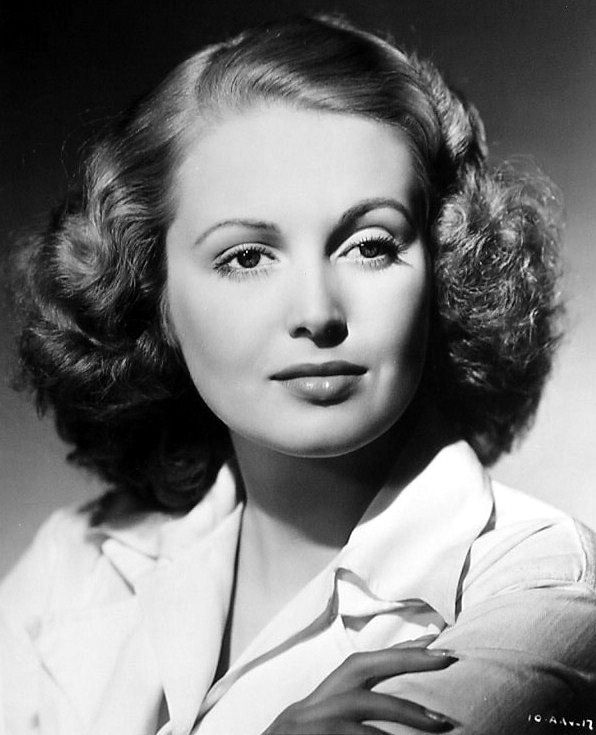
- Born: Winifred June Vlasek; May 5, 1917; Minneapolis, Minnesota, U.S.
- Died: May 16, 2005 (aged 88); Valley Village, Los Angeles, California, U.S.
- Education: Beverly Hills High School
- Occupation: Actress
- Years active: 1931–1961
- Known for: Chandu the Magician; Bonnie Scotland; The Road to Glory; Wee Willie Winkie
- Spouses: Victor Orsatti (m. 1937; div. 1938) John Roselli (m. 1939; div. 1943) John Morgan (m. 1946; div. 1952)
- Children: 1

June Lang (born Winifred June Vlasek, May 5, 1917 – May 16, 2005) was an American film actress.

== Early life ==
Born Winifred June Vlasek in Minneapolis, Minnesota, she was the daughter of Edith and Clarence Vlasek, After the family moved to Los Angeles, Lang trained at a school of dance and performed in revues in theaters in Los Angeles. She graduated from Beverly Hills High School in the summer graduating class of 1933.

== Career ==
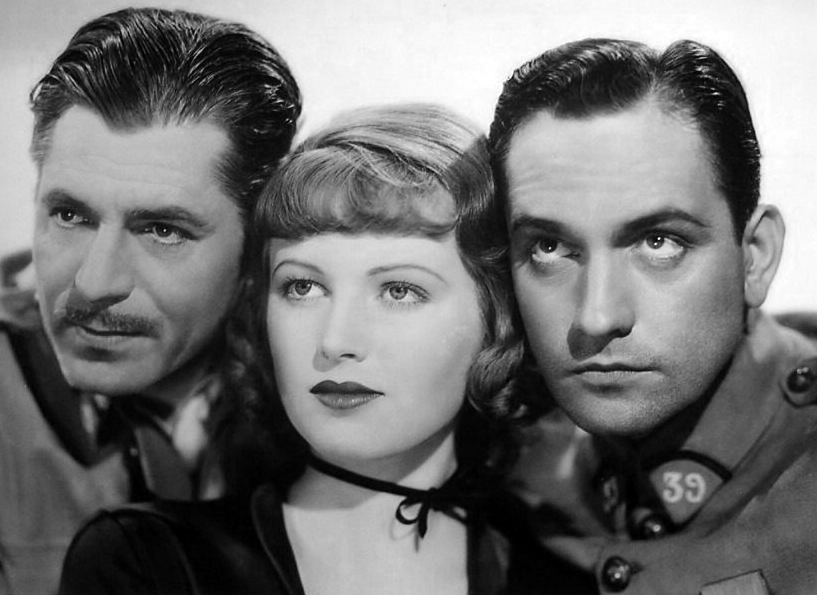
With Warner Baxter and Fredric March in The Road to Glory (1936)

At age 16, Lang was a dancer at a vaudeville theater in Los Angeles when she left that job to seek work at the Fox Film studio. The company had her teeth straightened and changed her name from Vlasek to Lang.

Lang made her film debut in 1931, with much of her early work coming in minor roles in musical and dramatic films. She gradually secured second lead roles in mostly B movies for 20th Century Fox. She played her debut feature film role in Young Sinners.

Early in Lang's career, she was a blonde when she worked for Fox Film, averaging "about one good role a year" and spending more time posing for publicity photographs while wearing a bathing suit. Her last film under her contract was Bonnie Scotland (1935), for which Fox loaned her to Hal Roach Studios. Fox did not renew her contract, and during her time of "brief retirement" she changed her hair color to chestnut. An encounter with producer Darryl F. Zanuck at the Trocadero night club led to her being cast as the romantic lead in Captain January (1936) for the new 20th Century Fox. Within 12 weeks she had five significant roles in films.

She soon graduated to leading roles, most notably in Bonnie Scotland (with Laurel and Hardy, 1935), in The Road to Glory (with Fredric March, Warner Baxter and Lionel Barrymore—written in part by William Faulkner—1936), and as Joyce Williams in Wee Willie Winkie (directed by John Ford, with Shirley Temple, Cesar Romero, and Victor McLaglen, 1937).

== Personal life ==
Lang first married her Hollywood agent, Victor Orsatti, on May 29, 1937, but they divorced on August 5, 1937. Her reputation as a wholesome leading lady was somewhat tarnished when she married Johnny Roselli, a Chicago connected mobster who helped control Hollywood movie unions, on April 1, 1939. Lang later said she had no idea that Roselli was a mobster. Lang and Roselli divorced in March, 1943. Fox Studios had released Lang from her contract one year before she was married to Roselli. She was released from contract in 1938, because against Fox studio orders, she left the United Kingdom, after she was cast in So This Is London, which was filmed at Pinewood Studios in London, Fox's U.K. studio. Lang and her mother left London because they feared an impending war in Europe. Three years after marrying him, Lang divorced Roselli, but she later found it more difficult to secure consistent film work. Lang married John Morgan in 1946 (they divorced in 1952), with whom she had a daughter.

Lang semi retired from acting in 1947, after struggling as a freelancer to re-establish her film career for several years. Lang occasionally appeared in minor roles on television. She died in May 2005, at 88.

== Partial filmography ==
- Young Sinners (1931) - Minor Role (uncredited)
- The Miracle Woman (1931) - Church Choir Singer (uncredited)
- She Wanted a Millionaire (1932) - Beauty Contest Contestant (uncredited)
- Chandu the Magician (1932) - Betty Lou Regent
- I Loved You Wednesday (1933) - Ballet Dancer
- The Man Who Dared (1933) - Barbara Novak
- Now I'll Tell (1934) - Girl at Beach (uncredited)
- She Learned About Sailors (1934) - Girl at Dance Hall (uncredited)
- Love Time (1934) - Minor Role (uncredited)
- Music in the Air (1934) - Sieglinde Lessing
- George White's 1935 Scandals (1935) - Chorine (uncredited)
- Bonnie Scotland (1935) - Lorna MacLaurel
- The Country Doctor (1936) - Mary MacKenzie
- Every Saturday Night (1936) - Bonnie Evers
- Captain January (1936) - Mary Marshall
- The Road to Glory (1936) - Monique La Coste
- White Hunter (1936) - Toni Varek
- Nancy Steele Is Missing! (1937) - Sheila O'Neill - aka Nancy Steele
- Wee Willie Winkie (1937) - Joyce Williams
- Ali Baba Goes to Town (1937) - Princess Miriam / June Lang
- International Settlement (1938) - Joyce Parker
- One Wild Night (1938) - Gale Gibson aka Jennifer Jewel
- Meet the Girls (1938) - Judy Davis
- Zenobia (1939) - Virginia
- Forged Passport (1939) - Rosa
- For Love or Money (1939) - Susan Bannister
- Captain Fury (1939) - Jeanette Dupre
- Inside Information (1939) - Kathleen Burke
- Convicted Woman (1940) - Georgia Mason aka The Duchess
- Isle of Destiny (1940) - Virginia Allerton
- Redhead (1941) - Dale Carter
- The Deadly Game (1941) - Christine Reisner
- Too Many Women (1942) - Gwenny Miller
- Footlight Serenade (1942) - June
- The City of Silent Men (1942) - Helen Hendricks
- Stage Door Canteen (1943) - Herself (Cameo)
- Flesh and Fantasy (1943) - Angela (uncredited)
- Up in Arms (1944) - Goldwyn Girl (uncredited)
- Three of a Kind (1944) - Delores O'Toole
- Lighthouse (1947) - Connie Armitage
