= Destination Moon (film) =

1950 film by Irving Pichel

- Theatrical release poster
- Directed by: Irving Pichel
- Screenplay by: Rip Van Ronkel; Robert A. Heinlein; James O'Hanlon
- Produced by: George Pal
- Starring: John Archer; Warner Anderson; Tom Powers; Dick Wesson
- Cinematography: Lionel Lindon
- Edited by: Duke Goldstone
- Music by: Leith Stevens
- Animation by: Laverne Harding
- Color process: Technicolor
- Production company: George Pal Productions
- Distributed by: Eagle-Lion Classics
- Release date: June 27, 1950 (United States)
- Running time: 91 minutes
- Country: United States
- Language: English
- Budget: $592,000
- Box office: $5 million or $1.3 million (US)

Destination Moon (a.k.a. Operation Moon) is a 1950 American Technicolor science fiction film, independently produced by George Pal and directed by Irving Pichel, that stars John Archer, Warner Anderson, Tom Powers, Dick Wesson and Grace Stafford (voice). The film was distributed in the United States and the United Kingdom by Eagle-Lion Classics.

Destination Moon was the first major U.S. science fiction film to deal with the practical scientific and engineering challenges of space travel and to speculate on what a crewed expedition to the Moon would look like. Noted science fiction author Robert A. Heinlein contributed to the screenplay.

The film's premise is that private industry will mobilize, finance, and manufacture the first spacecraft to the Moon, and that the U.S. government will be forced to purchase or lease the technology to remain the dominant power in space. Different industrialists cooperate to support the private venture.

== Plot ==
When their latest rocket test fails and government funding collapses, rocket scientist Dr. Charles Cargraves and space enthusiast General Thayer enlist the aid of aircraft magnate Jim Barnes. With the necessary millions raised privately from a group of patriotic U.S. industrialists, Cargraves, Thayer, and Barnes build an advanced single-stage-to-orbit atomic powered spaceship, named Luna, at their desert manufacturing and launch facility.

The project is soon threatened by a ginned-up public uproar over "radiation safety" but the three circumvent legal efforts to stop their expedition by launching the world's first Moon mission ahead of schedule. As a result, they must quickly substitute Joe Sweeney as their expedition's radar and radio operator, a replacement for Brown, now in the hospital with appendicitis.

En route to the Moon they are forced to spacewalk outside. They stay firmly attached to Luna with their magnetic boots so they can easily walk up to and free the frozen piloting radar antenna that the inexperienced Sweeney innocently greased before launch. In the process, Cargraves becomes untethered in free fall and is lost overboard. He is retrieved by Barnes, who cleverly uses a large oxygen cylinder with nozzle, retrieved by General Thayer, as an improvised propulsion unit to return them to Luna.

After achieving lunar orbit, the crew begins the complex landing procedure, but expedition leader Barnes uses too much fuel during the descent. Safely on the Moon, Cargraves and Barnes don space suits and descend rungs down the side of the rocket to explore the lunar surface. Urged by Barnes, Cargraves claims the Moon: "By the grace of God, and in the name of the United States of America, I take possession of this planet on behalf of, and for the benefit of, all mankind". Put in contact with Earth by radio, Cargraves describes what they see—a barren, desolate, and silent landscape, with a star-filled black sky and Earth "many times larger than the harvest Moon". Later, using forced perspective, Cargraves photographs Sweeney pretending to "hold up" the Earth like a modern Atlas. General Thayer surveys their surroundings with a Geiger counter and finds from the direction of the clicks that the lunar mountains further away may contain uranium. Events take a serious turn for the crew, however, when they realize that with their limited remaining fuel they must lighten Luna in order to achieve lunar escape velocity.

No matter how much non-critical equipment they strip and discard on the lunar surface, the hard numbers radioed from Earth continue to point to one conclusion: one of them will have to remain on the Moon if the others are to safely return to Earth. With time running out for their return launch window, the crew continues to engineer their way home. They finally jettison the ship's radio, losing contact with Earth. In addition, a spent oxygen cylinder is used as a tethered, suspended weight to pull their sole remaining space suit outside through the open airlock, which is then remotely closed and resealed. With the critical take-off weight finally achieved, and with all her crew safely aboard, Luna blasts off from the Moon for home.

In the final scene, as the crew approaches the Earth, the traditional "The End" title card heralds the dawn of the coming Space Age: "This is THE END...of the Beginning".

== Cast ==
- John Archer as Jim Barnes
- Warner Anderson as Dr. Charles Cargraves
- Tom Powers as General Thayer
- Dick Wesson as Joe Sweeney
- Erin O'Brien-Moore as Emily Cargraves
- Franklyn Farnum as Factory Worker (uncredited)
- Everett Glass as Mr. La Porte (uncredited)
- Knox Manning as Knox Manning (uncredited)
- Kenner G. Kemp as Businessman at meeting (uncredited)
- Mike Miller as Man (uncredited)
- Irving Pichel as Narrator of Woody Woodpecker Cartoon (uncredited)
- Cosmo Sardo as Businessman at Meeting (uncredited)
- Bert Stevens as Businessman at meeting (uncredited)
- Ted Warde as Brown (uncredited)
- Grace Stafford as Woody Woodpecker (voice) (uncredited)
  - Mel Blanc as Woody Woodpecker's trademark laugh (archive recording; uncredited)

== Production ==
Before Destination Moon, there were very few serious science fiction films: 1929's Frau im Mond (English Woman in the Moon), 1931's Frankenstein, and 1936's Things to Come are antecedents (though containing fantasy elements). However, the more juvenile-oriented Flash Gordon and Buck Rogers stories of the 1930s syndicated science fiction newspaper comic strips that were both adapted into radio serials and Universal Pictures film serials.

George Pal was a Hungarian who made commercials that played as short subjects with feature films in Europe. He later advanced into animated cartoon-like short features that were made using carefully hand-manipulated tiny sculptures instead of drawings; these shorts were called “Puppetoons”, and they became popular in Europe. Pal was in the U.S. when Hitler invaded Poland. He was offered a contract to produce his Puppetoons for Paramount Pictures, some of which were later nominated for Academy Awards.

=== Development ===
By 1949, Pal wanted to get into feature film production. He convinced the independent Eagle-Lion Films to co-finance his own two-picture deal, with him putting up half of the money. Part of the finance came from Peter Rathvorn and Floyd Odlum, who used to run RKO. The first of the two films, The Great Rupert, about a Puppetoon-like dancing squirrel, starring popular comic Jimmy Durante, flopped at the box office. But his second feature, Destination Moon, was a major hit.

=== Screenplay ===
Pal commissioned an initial screenplay from screenwriters James O'Hanlon and Rip Van Ronkel, but science fiction writer Robert A. Heinlein contributed significantly to Destination Moon's final screenplay, and also served as the film's technical adviser, recounting his experience in the article "Shooting 'Destination Moon'" in the July 1950 issue of Astounding Science Fiction. Certain story elements from Heinlein's 1947 juvenile novel Rocket Ship Galileo were adapted for use in the film, and in September, 1950, he published a tie-in novella, "Destination Moon", based on the screenplay. The film's storyline also resembles portions of Heinlein's novel The Man Who Sold the Moon, which he wrote in 1949 but did not publish until 1951, a year after the Pal film opened.

=== Marketing campaign ===
Eagle-Lion undertook an extensive marketing campaign for Destination Moon well before its release in theaters, proclaiming that the film was "Two Years in the Making!" as a mark of its higher quality. They promoted the film heavily in both general family magazines and in many science fiction digest magazines, emphasizing its Technicolor visuals and expert consultants in a commitment to scientific rigor and realistic detail. In 1950, the April 24th issue of LIFE magazine and the May issue of Popular Mechanics magazine both featured stories that discussed Destination Moon along with photos months before the film was released. The company later produced a 31-page pressbook that collected many of the advertisements, descriptions of pre-release promotional events and items, and some of the news feature articles that publicized the movie in the United States. The pressbook introductory material noted: "Long before 'Destination Moon' went into production the originality, boldness, and the timelessness of its theme won publicity breaks for it in such publications as LIFE, THIS WEEK, PARADE, THE AMERICAN COMIC WEEKLY, REDBOOK, TIME, REDBOOK and NEWSWEEK. In addition, many influential newspapers carried Sunday feature articles on it... This publicity continued as the picture neared completion and the picture is still attracting wide editorial space as it goes into release." The company also created a 28-page lobby booklet entitled "Facts About Destination Moon" that movie theaters could provide to patrons, emphasizing the intended scientific authenticity of the film. By the time Destination Moon was shown in theaters in the summer of 1950, its success seemed a foregone conclusion, thanks to its multi-media pre-release coverage. However, the large-scale advertising campaign reportedly had cost around $500,000 on top of similar production costs for the film itself.

=== 1949 movie set visit on television ===
At a time when only about 9 percent of American households had a television set, the independent Los Angeles station KTLA broadcast a visit to the movie set of Destination Moon for its October 11, 1949 episode of "City at Night". The program was preserved in black-and-white on Kinescope and features detailed views of the sets along with interviews with director Irving Pichel (who acts as a guide), producer George Pal, artist Chesley Bonestell, writer Robert Heinlein, and art director Ernst Fegté, as well as conversations with the four main actors wearing space suit costumes that have their hardware features and functions explained to the viewers. Among the details revealed during the broadcast, the Moon expedition is said to take place in the year 1960 and the cracks on the lunar surface are meant to represent volcanic fractures from lava that filled the crater then cooled (not "mudcracks" as sometimes stated). George Pal indicates that the film was scheduled for release in February of 1950–production delays pushed the actual release date to June 1950, with wide distribution only in August.

=== Matte paintings by Bonestell ===
Destination Moon uses matte paintings by noted astronomical artist Chesley Bonestell. These were used for the departure of the Luna from Earth; its approach to the Moon; the spaceship's landing on the lunar surface; and a panorama of the lunar landscape viewed by Cargraves and Barnes before they descend to the crater floor. Bonestell also designed the background lunar landscape for the set on the sound stage, depicting the rugged mountains forming the crater ring with Earth and stars visible in the sky. Bonestell's depiction of the landscape of the Moon for the film featured sharp and craggy mountain peaks and crater walls. However, photographs of the Moon from orbiting lunar satellites in the 1960s and from later human exploration revealed a less dramatic, more rounded and worn-down topography, eroded by millions of years of micrometeorite impacts.

An oft-noted criticism of the film is the fact that the lunar surface is crisscrossed with gaping cracks. As explained in a television visit to the movie set in 1949, the exposed cracks were meant to represent lava that had solidified and fractured when the landing-site crater formed. (During the first half of the 20th Century, most astronomers supported a primarily volcanic origin for lunar craters, rather than a result of impact events as confirmed in the 1960s.) Bonestell, who painted the large backdrop that mimicked lunar crags and mountains, was unhappy with the bare, exposed cracks, which were designed by art director Ernst Fegté. In line with scientific opinion at the time, Bonestell thought the surface of the Moon instead would be covered in a thick layer of very fine dust created by millions of years of thermal erosion of lunar rocks under the airless extremes of day and night temperatures. (Robotic and human exploration in the 1960s and 1970s showed that the surface of the Moon in fact is covered in a thin layer of abrasive fine dust over firmer, deeper layers of lunar regolith made up of tiny fragments from millions of years of micrometeorite and larger impacts.)

The lava cracks depicted in Destination Moon often have been described or misidentified in later sources as "mudcracks", which would imply that the lunar surface was once mud, requiring water. (The Moon does not have water, an astronomical detail clearly known to the filmmakers and to the scientific consultants on the film.) Gail Morgan Hickman, author of The Films of George Pal, later asked Bonestell about the inaccurate cracks depicted on the Moon's surface in the film, and he insisted: "That was a mistake". But Pal explained to Hickman, "Chesley was right, of course ... but we were shooting on a small sound stage because of our limited budget. We had to make the set look bigger. Chesley designed a beautiful backdrop, but it needed something to give it depth. That's why we made the cracks. The cracks in the foreground were big and those in the distance were small, so it gave a real feeling of perspective. For some scenes we even used midgets in small spacesuits to add to the feeling of depth."

=== Luna rocket design ===
Heinlein and Bonestell worked out the design for a single-stage atomic Moon rocket based on the German V-2 rocket with added side wings and four large landing struts at the base. Ernst Fegté modified Bonestell's working design into a slimmer, tapered body without a pair of upper wings and only one slanting landing strut. The revised Luna rocket replaced the other three landing struts with two broad wing-like horizontal tail fins and a smaller upper tail fin, each with an enlarged pod at the trailing edge outer tip to provide stable support when the craft was in an upright position. The entire rocket was described as 150 feet long. The concept of an atomic-powered rocket had an earlier history, including in the 1933 novel When Worlds Collide. Heinlein had used an atomic-powered rocket in his 1947 juvenile novel Rocket Ship Galileo, with heated zinc as a propellant. The Luna's atomic engine used water superheated to steam for thrust, an idea proposed in the 1940s. Heinlein's novella version of Destination Moon published in the September 1950 issue of Short Stories magazine explained the rocket's propulsion system: "Thirteen-fifteenths of its mass was water, ready to be flashed into incandescent steam by the atomic pile, to be thrown away at thirty thousand feet per second." Such early concepts for nuclear-powered rockets are not considered plausible technologies based on more recent potential nuclear engine designs.

=== Director ===
Irving Pichel began his Hollywood career as an actor during the 1920s and early 1930s, in such films as Dracula's Daughter and The Story of Temple Drake. He began directing in 1932; Destination Moon was his 30th film. Pichel was blacklisted after he was subpoenaed by the House Un-American Activities Committee in 1947, despite having never been called to testify. He directed five more films after Destination Moon before his death in 1954.

=== Woody Woodpecker ===
George Pal and Walter Lantz, the latter of whom created the cartoon character Woody Woodpecker, had been close friends ever since Pal left Europe and arrived in Hollywood. Out of friendship and for good luck, Pal always tried to include Woody in all his films. (On the commentary track of the Special Collector's DVD Edition of George Pal's science fiction film The War of the Worlds (1953), actors Ann Robinson and Gene Barry point out that Woody can be seen in a tree top, center screen, near the beginning of their film.)

Walter Lantz Productions produced an animated sequence featuring Woody (voiced by Grace Stafford), in which the scientific principles behind space travel and how a trip to the Moon might be accomplished is explained. The cartoon is shown to a gathering of American industrialists who, it is hoped, will patriotically finance such a daring venture before an unnamed, non-western power can do so successfully.

=== Production credits ===
- Director — Irving Pichel
- Producer — George Pal
- Writing — Rip Van Ronkel, Robert A. Heinlein, and James O'Hanlon (screenplay), Robert A. Heinlein (underlying novel)
- Cinematography — Lionel Lindon (photography)
- Art direction — Ernst Fegté (production designer), George Sawley (set decoration)
- Film editor — Duke Goldstone
- Production supervisor — Martin Eisenberg
- Cartoon sequences — Walter Lantz
- Technicolor color consultant — Robert Brower
- Assistant director — Harold Godsoe
- Special effects — Lee Zavitz
- Makeup artist — Webster Phillips
- Sound — William Lynch
- Music — Leith Stevens (music), David Torbett (orchestration)
- Technical — Chesley Bonestell (technical advisor of astronomical art), Robert A. Heinlein (technical advisor), John S. Abbott (technical supervisor)

== Soundtrack ==
The soundtrack music, written by composer Leith Stevens, is noteworthy for its atmospheric themes and musical motifs, all of which add subtle but important detail and emotion to the various dramatic moments in the film. According to George Pal biographer Gail Morgan Hickman, "Stevens ... consulted with numerous scientists, including Wernher von Braun, to get an idea of what space was like in order to create it musically." The Stevens Destination Moon film score had its first U.S. release in 1950 on a 10-inch 33 rpm Monaural LP by Columbia Records (#CL 6151):

Side A
No.	Title	Writer(s)	Length
1.	"Earth: Prelude"	Leith Stevens	02:50
2.	"Earth: Planning and Building of the Great Rocket"	Stevens	05:03
3.	"In Outer Space"	Stevens	06:53
Total length:			14:46

Side B
No.	Title	Writer(s)	Length
1.	"On the Surface of the Moon: The Crater Harpalus"	Stevens	04:10
2.	"On the Surface of the Moon: Exploring the Moon"	Stevens	01:58
3.	"On the Surface of the Moon: The Dilemma"	Stevens	02:40
4.	"On the Surface of the Moon: Escape from the Moon and Finale"	Stevens	03:11
Total length:			11:59

Later in the 1950s, the score was re-released on a 12-inch high-fidelity mono LP by Omega Disk (#1003). Omega Disk re-released it in 1960 as a stereophonic 33 1/3 LP (#OLS-3). In 1980, the score was re-released on stereo LP by Varèse Sarabande (#STV 81130) and again in 1995 on stereo LP by Citadel Records (#STC 77101). An expanded and complete 56.32 minute version of Steven's original film score, limited to 1,000 copies, was released on CD in 2012 by Monstrous Movie Music (#MMM-1967); also on the CD is Clarence Wheeler's incidental music used for the film's Woody Woodpecker cartoon. An illustrated 20-page booklet of liner notes is also included.

== Reception ==
=== Release ===
Despite a budget of approximately $500,000 and a large national print media and radio publicity campaign preceding its delayed release, Destination Moon ultimately became the "second" space adventure film of the post-World War II era. Piggybacking on the growing publicity and expectation surrounding the Pal film, Lippert Pictures quickly shot Rocketship X-M in 18 days on a $94,000 budget. The film, about the first spaceship to land on Mars, opened theatrically 25 days before the Pal feature. Nevertheless, despite the fact that Destination Moon was indeed the second space film of the era to be released to theaters, its two years of production, hefty budget, its use of Technicolor, its significant influence in the film industry, and the technical consultation by important scientists and engineers during production—the ultimate value of the picture, also its priority, transcends the mere physical fact that it was second in the marketplace. Certainly, Rocketship X-M itself would never have been made if the highly probable success of Destination Moon had not caught Robert Lippert's attention.

=== Critical reaction ===
==== Contemporary reviews ====
Bosley Crowther in his review of Destination Moon for The New York Times, opined, "... we've got to say this for Mr. Pal and his film: they make a lunar expedition a most intriguing and picturesque event. Even the solemn preparations for this unique exploratory trip, though the lesser phase of the adventure, are profoundly impressive to observe".

Science writer, science fiction novelist, and early space enthusiast Arthur C. Clarke wrote: "[T]his [is a] remarkable exciting and often very beautiful film, the first Technicolor expedition into space. After years of comic strip treatment of interplanetary travel, Hollywood has at last made a serious and scientifically accurate film on the subject, with full cooperation of astronomers and rocket experts. The result is worthy of the enormous pains that have obviously been taken, and it is a tribute to the equally obvious enthusiasm of those responsible".

==== Later 20th century reviews ====
“Trivial in plot ... viewed today Destination Moon is less than impressive; the rocket journey is ploddingly consistent with the scientific standards of 1950... Destination Moon makes rather dull viewing nowadays”. —John Baxter in Science Fiction in the Cinema (1970)

In his 1979 autobiography, science writer and science fiction novelist Isaac Asimov called the Pal film "the first intelligent science-fiction movie made".

"Today it seems dated and slow-moving with flat characters". —John Brosnan in The Science Fiction Encyclopedia (1979)

Science fiction film scholar Bill Warren in Keep Watching the Skies! (first edition 1982, pages 1—6) found the film "dully conventional" beyond its special effects, noting that, given Heinlein's role, "it's surprising that Destination Moon was not more sophisticated in terms of drama and characterization". The "wisecracking electronics technician played by Dick Wesson" was meant to provide comic relief, "but today he's highly noticeable, seeming painfully forced and unbelievable".

Peter Nicholls in The Encyclopedia of Science Fiction (1993) said, “Destination Moon is a film with considerable dignity and, in a quiet way, a genuine sense of wonder”.

“The Destination Moon script seems colorless and wooden”. —Phil Hardy in The Overlook Film Encyclopedia: Science Fiction (1994)

==== 21st century reviews ====
“Destination Moon now seems tame”. —John Stanley in Creature Features: The Science Fiction, Fantasy and Horror Movie Guide (2000)

“The visual effects in Pal’s [Destination Moon] were art. They are aesthetically stunning ... they bear the imprint of gifted artists’ hands.... The Luna rocket of Destination Moon still [has] the capacity to astonish”. — Justin Humphreys in “A Cinema of Miracles: Remembering George Pal”, from the memorial program notes for the Academy of Motion Picture Arts and Sciences’ George Pal: Discovering the Fantastic: A Centennial Celebration, August 27, 2008

In 2010, author and film critic Leonard Maltin awarded the film two-and-a-half out of four stars, calling it "modestly mounted but still effective". He also praised Bonestell's lunar paintings as being visually striking.

“Destination Moon has aged badly ... [it] seems old hat and pedestrian to today’s viewers... But make no mistake about it, this picture, flaws and all, is a very important step in the evolution of the serious, special effects-laden science fiction motion picture that reached its peak with ... 2001: A Space Odyssey”. — Barry Atkinson in Atomic Age Cinema (2014)

Writing in 2014, science and religion historian Catherine L. Newell put the film in the context of American faith in the future with advancing technology after World War II, with outer space as the successor to America's western frontier in the 19th century: "The film's themes of discovery, sacrifice, triumph over circumstance, and the necessity of technology, are representative of Americans' belief in a collective ability to overcome evil, and of a newfound faith in their destiny to conquer the 'final frontier'."

In 2020, on the 70th anniversary of the film's release, former Apollo mission engineer Albert Jackson detailed Robert Heinlein's role and noted the movie's scientific ambitions: "In a way, Destination Moon was a sort of culmination of John W Campbell's ambition to move away from pulp SF to something more sophisticated. The film is about as far away from Brass Bras and Bug Eyed Monsters as one can get." He noted, however, that "Destination Moon's success did not usher in a great era of space flight movies."

Reflecting on the 75th anniversary of Destination Moon in 2025, writer Andrew Kidd concluded: "In spite of numerous flaws, the film is intelligent enough and assertive enough in conveying its message to merit serious attention from thoughtful audience members, and may also serve as a useful starting point for discussion on the roles both government and private enterprise have to play in the next step in the Space Age."

=== Awards and honors ===
Effects director Lee Zavitz won the Academy Award for Best Special Effects for Destination Moon. Ernst Fegté and George Sawley were also nominated for the Art Direction Academy Award for their work on the film.

At the 1st Berlin International Film Festival, it won the Bronze Berlin Bear Award for "Thrillers and Adventure Films".

Retro Hugo Awards: A special 1951 Hugo Award for Best Dramatic Presentation was retroactively awarded to Destination Moon by the 59th World Science Fiction Convention (2001) exactly 50 years later for being one of the science fiction films eligible in calendar year 1950. (50 years, 75 years, or 100 years govern the time periods when a Retro Hugo can be awarded by a Worldcon for the years prior to 1953 when the Hugos were established and first awarded.)

== Adaptations ==
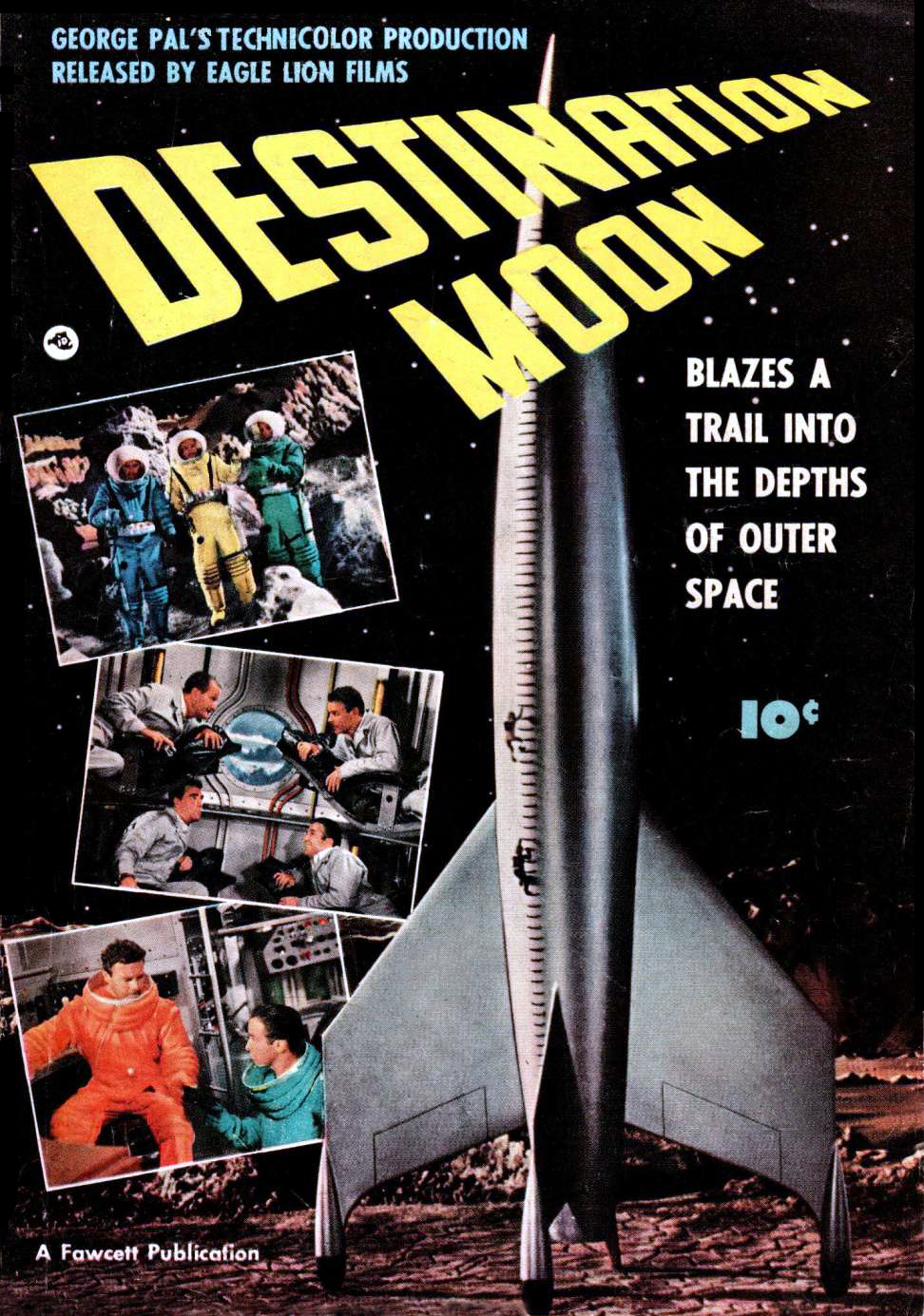
Comic book tie-in (Fawcett Comics, 1950).

Episode 12 of the Dimension X radio series was called Destination Moon and was based on Heinlein's final draft of the film's shooting script. During the broadcast on June 24, 1950, the program was interrupted by a news bulletin announcing that North Korea had declared war on South Korea, marking the beginning of the Korean War.

Robert A. Heinlein published a short story adaptation of his screenplay in the September 1950 issue of Short Stories magazine.

A highly condensed version of the Dimension X "Destination Moon" radio play was adapted by Charles Palmer and was released by Capitol Records for children, who had become familiar with their recordings through a record series approved by Bozo the Clown. The series featured 7-inch, 78-rpm recordings and full-color booklets which children could follow as they listened to the stories. The Destination Moon record was narrated by Tom Reddy, and Billy May composed the incidental and background music. The record's storyline took considerable liberties with the film's plot and characters, although the general shape of the film story remained.

In 1950, Fawcett Publications released a 10-cent Destination Moon film tie-in comic book. DC Comics also published a comic book preview of the Pal film; it was the cover feature of DC's science fiction anthology comic book Strange Adventures # 1 (September 1950). In addition, a text story was published by Youthful in Captain Science #1 (November 1950), including still photographs from the film.

== See also ==
- 1950 in film
- List of science fiction films of the 1950s

== Bibliography ==
- Adamson. Joe The Walter Lantz Story: With Woody Woodpecker and Friends. New York: G.P. Putnam's Sons, 1985. ISBN 978-0-39913-096-0.
- Buhle, Paul and Dave Wagner. A Very Dangerous Citizen: Abraham Lincoln Polonsky and the Hollywood Left. Berkeley, California: University of California Press, 2002. ISBN 978-0-52023-672-1.
- Heinlein, Robert A. "Shooting Destination Moon". Astounding Science Fiction. London: Atlas Pub. and Distributing Co., July 1950. ISSN 1059-2113.
- Hickman, Gail Morgan. The Films of George Pal. New York: A. S. Barnes and Company, 1977. ISBN 0-498-01960-8.
- Johnson, William. Focus on the Science Fiction Film (Illustrated ed.). Englewood Cliffs, New Jersey: Prentice-Hall, 1972. ISBN 978-0-13795-179-6.
- Kondo, Yoji. Requiem: New Collected Works by Robert A. Heinlein and Tributes to the Grand Master. New York: Tom Doherty Associates, 1992. ISBN 978-0-81251-391-2.
- Koszarski, Richard. Hollywood Directors, 1941–1976. New York: Oxford University Press, 1977. ISBN 978-0-19502-218-6.
- Lev, Peter. Transforming the Screen: 1950–1959. Berkeley, California: University of California Press, 2003. ISBN 978-0-52024-966-0.
- McBride, Joseph. Searching For John Ford: A Life. New York: St. Martin's Press, 2003. ISBN 978-0-31231-011-0.
- Miller, Thomas Kent. Mars in the Movies: A History. Jefferson, North Carolina: McFarland & Company, 2016. ISBN 978-0-7864-9914-4.
- Parish, James Robert and Michael R. Pitts. The Great Science Fiction Pictures. Metuchen, New Jersey: Scarecrow Press, 1977. ISBN 978-0-81081-029-7.
- Pym, John, ed. "Destination Moon." Time Out Film Guide. London: Time Out Guides Limited, 2004. ISBN 978-0-14101-354-1.
- Schneider, Cy. Destination Moon soundtrack liner notes, Omega Disk label stereophonic 33 1/3 LP (#OSL-3), 1960. ASIN: B002MK54BQ.
- Strick, Philip. Science Fiction Movies (Illustrated ed.). London: Octopus Books 1976. ISBN 978-0-7064-0470-8.
- Warren, Bill (2009). Keep Watching the Skies!: American Science Fiction Movies of the 50s (21st century ed.). Jefferson, North Carolina: McFarland & Company. ISBN 978-0-78644-230-0..
