= Bill Cracks Down =

1937 film

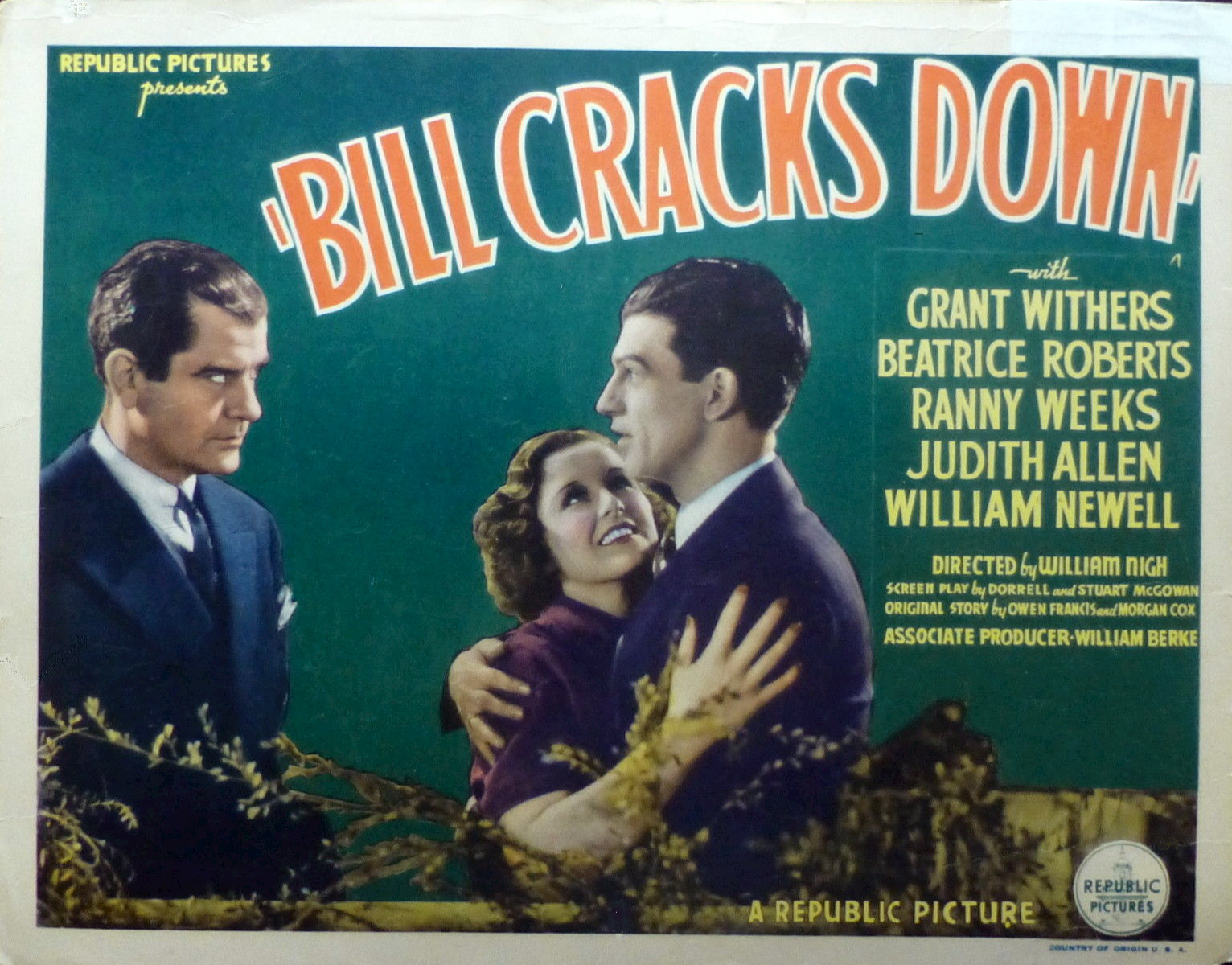
- Lobby card
- Directed by: William Nigh
- Written by: Dorrell McGowan (screenplay); Stuart E. McGowan (screenplay)
- Story by: Morgan Cox; Owen Francis
- Produced by: William Berke (associate producer)
- Starring: Grant Withers; Beatrice Roberts; Ranny Weeks; Judith Allen; William Newell
- Cinematography: William Nobles
- Edited by: Edward Mann
- Production company: Republic Pictures
- Distributed by: Republic Pictures
- Release date: March 22, 1937
- Running time: 61 minutes
- Country: United States
- Language: English

Bill Cracks Down is a 1937 American action romantic drama film directed by William Nigh and starring Grant Withers, Beatrice Roberts, Ranny Weeks and Judith Allen. It was produced and distributed by Republic Pictures. The film was released under the alternative title Men of Steel in the United Kingdom.

== Plot ==
Bill Reardon runs a steel mill and is the idol of his workers; he'll forego his board meetings to challenge his workers in coal shoveling contests. His heart eventually gives out, but prior to his death he makes his will out with some unusual provisos. His playboy artist son Bill Junior returns from Paris to discover that in order to receive his inheritance he must work in the steel mill for one year with a false name, with the foreman "Tons" Walker being in charge of the mill. "Tons" decides to build Junior's character by changing him from an office file clerk to a hard working coal shoveling steel man. Junior plans his revenge by seducing "Tons"' fiancee.

=== Tagline ===
Men of Steel Meet Iron-Willed Women

== Cast ==
- Grant Withers as "Tons" Walker
- Beatrice Roberts as Susan Bailey
- Ranny Weeks as Bill Reardon Jr., aka Bill Hall
- Judith Allen as Elaine Witworth
- William Newell as Eddie "Porky" Plunkett
- Pierre Watkin as William "Bill" Reardon Sr.
- Roger Williams as Steve, Mill Foreman
- Georgia Caine as Mrs. Witworth
- Greta Meyer as Hilda
- Edgar Norton as Jarvis, the Butler
- Harry Depp as Smalley, the Lawyer
- Eugene King as Zimich
- Landers Stevens as Dr. Colcord
- Eddie 'Rochester' Anderson as Chauffeur
- Jean Carmen as Girl (uncredited)
- Rolfe Sedan as Jewelry Salesman (uncredited)
- Tom Steele as Mill Worker at Party (uncredited)
