= Santa Fe (film) =

1951 film by Irving Pichel

- Theatrical release poster
- Directed by: Irving Pichel
- Written by: Louis Stevens
- Screenplay by: Kenneth Gamet
- Based on: Santa Fe, The Railroad That Built an Empire; 1945 novel by James Vance Marshall
- Produced by: Harry Joe Brown
- Starring: Randolph Scott
- Cinematography: Charles Lawton Jr.
- Edited by: Gene Havlick
- Music by: Paul Sawtell
- Color process: Technicolor
- Production company: Scott-Brown Productions
- Distributed by: Columbia Pictures
- Release date: April 1, 1951
- Running time: 87 minutes
- Country: United States
- Language: English
- Box office: $1,075,000 (U.S. rentals)

Santa Fe is a 1951 American Western film directed by Irving Pichel and starring Randolph Scott. The film is based on the novel Santa Fe by James Vance Marshall. Pichel narrates the film.

== Plot ==
In northwest Missouri in 1867, Britt Canfield, one of four ex-Confederate brothers, heads west for a new life. Britt accepts a job with the Santa Fe Railway while his three brothers find themselves on the wrong side of the law. Britt is eventually obliged to bring his brothers to justice, but the real man behind their criminal activities is gambling boss Cole Sanders.

== Cast ==
- Randolph Scott as Brit Canfield
- Janis Carter as Judith Chandler
- Jerome Courtland as Terry Canfield
- Peter M. Thompson as Tom Canfield
- John Archer as Clint Canfield
- Warner Anderson as Dave Baxter
- Roy Roberts as Cole Sanders
- Billy House as Luke Plummer
- Olin Howland as Dan Dugan
- Allene Roberts as Ella Sue Canfield

== See also ==
- List of American films of 1951
- Santa Fe, New Mexico
