= Three of a Kind (1944 film) =

1944 film

- Directed by: D. Ross Lederman
- Written by: Earle Snell; Arthur Caesar
- Produced by: Sam Katzman; Jack Dietz
- Starring: Billy Gilbert; Shemp Howard; Maxie Rosenbloom; Helen Gilbert; June Lang
- Cinematography: Marcel Le Picard
- Edited by: Lloyd Friedgen
- Music by: Edward Kay (musical director)
- Production company: Banner Productions
- Distributed by: Monogram Pictures Corp.
- Release date: July 22, 1944
- Running time: 60 minutes
- Country: United States
- Language: English

Three of a Kind is a 1944 American comedy film directed by D. Ross Lederman for the Poverty Row studio Monogram Pictures. It is the first of three features starring the comedy team of Billy Gilbert, Shemp Howard and Maxie Rosenbloom. The follow-up feature, Crazy Knights, was released in December 1944 and the team's final production, Trouble Chasers, premiered in June 1945. Three of a Kind was re-released by Astor Pictures in 1951 under the title Cookin' Up Trouble.

== Plot ==
Unemployed vaudevillians Billy and Shemp are taking care of Jimmy, the orphaned son of fellow performer Paul. Cafe owner Maxie hires them as entertainers, while Jimmy's greedy stepmother Belle learns that he is the beneficiary of Paul's life insurance policy and tries to gain custody. In order to keep Jimmy, Billy considers marrying Dolores, the hostess at Maxie's.

== Cast ==
- Billy Gilbert as Billy Gilbert
- Shemp Howard as Shemp Howard
- Maxie Rosenbloom as Maxie Rosenbloom
- Helen Gilbert as Belle Collins
- June Lang as Delores O'Toole
- Buzzy Henry as Jimmy Collins
- Paul Phillips as Paul Collins
- Wheeler Oakman as Oliver
- Sid Saylor as Customer
- Frank Jaquet as Judge
- Milton Kibbee as Welfare Worker
- Jimmie Haine
- Dick Carlton as Radio Rascals
