= The Way to Love =

1933 film by Norman Taurog

- Directed by: Norman Taurog
- Screenplay by: Gene Fowler; Benjamin Glazer
- Produced by: Benjamin Glazer
- Starring: Maurice Chevalier; Ann Dvorak
- Cinematography: Charles Lang
- Edited by: Hugh Bennett
- Production company: Paramount Pictures
- Distributed by: Paramount Pictures
- Release date: October 20, 1933
- Running time: 80 minutes
- Country: United States
- Language: English

The Way to Love is a 1933 American pre-Code romantic comedy film directed by Norman Taurog and starring Maurice Chevalier and Ann Dvorak. Edward Everett Horton was the principal featured player.

At one stage Carole Lombard was to have co starred against Chevalier.

Filming started 9 January 1933.

== Plot ==
Chevalier portrays a "happy-go-lucky Parisian street gypsy" who protects Dvorak's character when she is threatened by her partner in a knife-throwing act.

== Cast ==
- Maurice Chevalier
- Ann Dvorak
- Edward Everett Horton
- Minna Gombell
- Blanche Frederici
- John Miljan
- Grace Bradley
- George Rigas
- Sydney Toler
