= Meet the Girls =

1938 film by Eugene Forde

- Theatrical release poster
- Directed by: Eugene Forde
- Screenplay by: Marguerite Roberts
- Produced by: Sol M. Wurtzel
- Starring: June Lang; Lynn Bari; Robert (Tex) Allen; Ruth Donnelly; Gene Lockhart; Wally Vernon
- Cinematography: Edward Snyder
- Edited by: Fred Allen
- Production company: 20th Century Fox
- Distributed by: 20th Century Fox
- Release date: October 7, 1938
- Running time: 60 minutes
- Country: United States
- Language: English

Meet the Girls is a 1938 American comedy film directed by Eugene Forde and written by Marguerite Roberts. The film stars June Lang, Lynn Bari, Robert (Tex) Allen, Ruth Donnelly, Gene Lockhart and Wally Vernon. The film was released on October 7, 1938, by 20th Century Fox.

== Cast ==
- June Lang as Judy Davis
- Lynn Bari as Terry Wilson
- Robert (Tex) Allen as Charles Tucker
- Ruth Donnelly as Daisy Watson
- Gene Lockhart as Homer Watson
- Wally Vernon as Delbert Jones
- Erik Rhodes as Maurice Leon
- Constantine Romanoff as Tiny
- Jack Norton as Fletcher
- Emmett Vogan as Purser Brady
- Paul McVey as First Mate Collins
- Harlan Briggs as Ship's Captain
