= George Sawley =

American set decorator

- Born: June 18, 1904; Kansas
- Died: April 26, 1967 (aged 62); Los Angeles, California
- Occupations: Set decorator Art director
- Years active: 1927-1962

George Sawley (June 18, 1904 – April 26, 1967) was an American set decorator and art director. He was nominated for two Academy Awards in the category Best Art Direction. He was born in Kansas and died in Los Angeles, California.

== Awards ==
Sawley was nominated for two Academy Awards for Best Art Direction:

- Reap the Wild Wind (1942)
- Destination Moon (1950)

== Selected filmography ==
- Once and Forever (1927)
- Stormy Waters (1928)
- Kathleen Mavourneen (1930)
- Reap the Wild Wind (1942)
- The Crystal Ball (1943)
- The Story of Dr. Wassell (1944)
- Destination Moon (1950)
- ‘’Harvey’’ (1950)
- Drums in the Deep South (1951)
- Chicago Calling (1951)
