= Lee Zavitz =

Leland "Lee" Zavitz (August 20, 1904– June 2, 1977) was a special effects technician. He was born in Mount Vernon, Washington. His first major impact was for his work on John Ford's 1937 film, The Hurricane. Zavitz's work on the 1950 space fantasy film Destination Moon won the Academy Award for Best Visual Effects. He also worked on films such as Around the World in Eighty Days (1956), The Alamo (1960), Sodom and Gomorrah (1963), The Pink Panther (1963) and John Frankenheimer's The Train (1964). His last film was Sydney Pollack's wartime chiller Castle Keep in 1969.

Zavitz held patents on several devices used in his film work, including fog machines, rain bombs, an exploding wagon and "a lightning torch that can be seen for 50 miles."
