= The Missing Lady =

1946 film by Phil Karlson

- Directed by: Phil Karlson
- Written by: George Callahan
- Based on: The Shadow by Walter B. Gibson
- Produced by: Joe Kaufman
- Starring: Kane Richmond; Barbara Read
- Cinematography: William A. Sickner
- Edited by: Ace Herman
- Music by: Eddie Kay
- Production company: Monogram Pictures
- Distributed by: Monogram Pictures
- Release date: August 17, 1946
- Running time: 60 minutes
- Country: United States
- Language: English

The Missing Lady is a 1946 American mystery film directed by Phil Karlson and starring Kane Richmond and Barbara Read. It was the third and final in a series of three films released by Monogram in 1946 starring Richmond as The Shadow, the others being The Shadow Returns and Behind The Mask.

== Plot ==
Lamont Cranston, alias The Shadow, investigates when an art dealer is murdered and his valuable jade statuette is stolen.

== Cast ==
- Kane Richmond as Lamont Cranston (The Shadow)
- Barbara Read as Margo Lane
- Pierre Watkin as Commissioner Weston
- Claire Carleton as Rose Dawson
- Garry Owen as Johnson

== Reception ==
Critic Leonard Maltin wrote that of the three Monogram Shadow films released in 1946, The Missing Lady was "the best of the series, played like a straight film noir and offering a few surprise twists." Ron Backer wrote: "Although it is faint praise, The Missing Lady is the best of the Shadow movies [...]".
