= The Shadow Returns =

1946 film by William Beaudine, Phil Rosen

- Theatrical release poster
- Directed by: Phil Rosen; William Beaudine (uncredited)
- Written by: George Callahan (screenplay and story); Walter B. Gibson (character)
- Produced by: Lou Brock (associate producer); Joe Kaufmann (producer)
- Starring: See below
- Cinematography: William A. Sickner
- Edited by: Ace Herman
- Music by: Edward J. Kay
- Production company: Monogram Pictures
- Distributed by: Monogram Pictures
- Release date: February 16, 1946
- Running time: 61 minutes
- Country: United States
- Language: English

The Shadow Returns is a 1946 American comedy crime film directed by Phil Rosen and starring Kane Richmond, Barbara Read, and Tom Dugan. It features the pulp-fiction character The Shadow, already a popular hero of novels and a radio show. It was the first in a series of three films released by Monogram Pictures in 1946 starring Richmond in the role.

== Plot ==
Private detective Lamont Cranston steps in to solve a murder for the police with the assistance of his alter ego. People are literally flying off balconies to their deaths as Lamont Cranston, aka the Shadow, tries to make sense out of a confusing jumble of murders, disappearances, jewels that aren't jewels, hidden laboratories and secret formulas.

== Cast ==
- Kane Richmond as Lamont Cranston/The Shadow
- Barbara Read as Margo Lane
- Tom Dugan as Shrevvy
- Joseph Crehan as Police Insp. Cardona
- Pierre Watkin as Police Commissioner J.R. Weston
- Robert Emmett Keane as Charles Frobay
- Frank Reicher as Michael Hasdon
- Lester Dorr as William Monk
- Rebel Randall as Lenore Jessup
- Emmett Vogan as Joseph Yomans, aka Paul Breck
- Sherry Hall as Robert Buell
- Cyril Delevanti as John Adams, the Butler

== Reception ==
The New York Times called The Shadow Returns "the first of three above-average Monogram features" but that the character Margo Lane, an intelligent and resourceful character on the radio series, was portrayed as a "blithering idiot" and that Margo came off "far stupider than the film's official comedy relief, Cranston's chauffeur Shrevvie". The Shadow Returns was thought to be "an entertaining mystery" and the disappearing gimmick considered "handled with subtlety and inventiveness" by director Phil Rosen.

== Sequels ==
The film was followed by two sequels, Behind the Mask (1946) and The Missing Lady (1946), with Richmond and Read reprising their roles.
