= Midnight Intruder =

1938 film by Arthur Lubin

- Directed by: Arthur Lubin
- Screenplay by: George Waggner; Lester Cole
- Based on: novel "Synthetic Gentleman" by Channing Pollock
- Produced by: Trem Carr
- Starring: Louis Hayward; Barbara Read; J.C. Nugent; Barbara Read
- Cinematography: Milton Krasner
- Edited by: Bernard W. Burton
- Production company: Universal Pictures
- Distributed by: Universal Pictures
- Release date: February 6, 1938 (United States)
- Running time: 66-68 minutes
- Country: United States
- Language: English
- Budget: $110,000

Midnight Intruder is a 1938 American comedy film directed by Arthur Lubin starring Louis Hayward, Eric Linden, J.C. Nugent and Barbara Read.

== Plot ==
After losing all his money gambling on horses, former newspaper reporter Barry Gilbert and "Doc" Norton break into a vacant mansion belonging to the Reitters for shelter from the rain. Just as the pair are settling in, Willetts and three other servants arrive. Willetts, the butler, does not know what the long-absent, but expected John Clark Reitter Jr. looks like, so he assumes that Barry is him. Barry decides to impersonate young Reitter, the black sheep son of a wealthy New York newspaper publisher, for a while when he learns the family will be away for weeks.

A neighbor, Patricia Hammond, develops an interest in Barry, while a showgirl, Peggy, wife of the real John Reitter Jr. (under the name Jay Rogers), shows up and tells him her husband is being framed for the murder of a political bigshot. Barry agrees to try to clear him in exchange for Peggy not revealing his masquerade. Barry reluctantly accepts a job on Reitter Sr.'s paper under an assumed name, and though editor Bill Harwood warns him not to play detective (a common tendency of new reporters), he does anyway. He gets into trouble with Patricia when he learns that her father, Judge Hammond, was with the victim the day he was killed. He jumps to the conclusion that the judge is the killer, but the real murderer - nightclub owner Luis Romano - is eventually caught (in spite of Barry's efforts), and John is released. When Patricia and her father are introduced to John by his father, who has returned early, they wonder who Barry really is.

Meanwhile, Barry does his best to hide what has gone on and to present John in the best light to his family. John's mother learns the truth from John and Peggy, but is pleased to conceal the story from her husband, who is very proud of his reformed son.

Harwood lets Barry keep his job and sends him to get the scoop on a rich widow's new husband, who turns out to be Doc Norton. Patricia catches up with him and demands to know what is going on. When Barry tells her it would take a lifetime to explain, she replies, "Darling, that's just what I mean."

== Cast ==
- Louis Hayward as Barry Gilbert
- Eric Linden as John Clark Reitter Jr.
- J. C. Nugent aa "Doc" Norton
- Barbara Read as Patricia Hammond
- Irving Bacon as Evans
- Robert Greig as Willetts
- Pierre Watkin as Peter Winslow
- Sheila Bromley as Peggy
- Paul Everton as John Clark Reitter
- Nana Bryant as Mrs. Reitter
- Joseph Crehan as Bill Harwood (as Joe Crehan)
- Selmer Jackson as Judge Hammond
- Jan Duggan as Mrs. Randolph

== Production ==
The film was based on a novel Synthetic Gentleman by Channing Pollock. Pollock best known as a playwright and in June 1933 reported that he was working on the novel with a view to turning it into a play for London, where he felt critics were kinder, and because in England he would not have to share the movie rights with his manager as he would have to do in America. The novel was published in 1934 and the New York Times called it "a pleasing blend of romance, mystery and adventure and there is not a dull page in it." "This one clicks" said Los Angeles Times.

In February 1937 the film rights were bought by Universal. In March it was announced the film would be produced by Trem Carr; it would be a change of pace for Carr, who had been making "outdoor films" for Universal "with his own money" Several of these had been directed by Arthur Lubin who would direct the film.

The film had a working title of Welcome Imposter. Filming was to start 22 November 1937. It eventually started December 1937.

By November the title had been changed to Midnight Intruder.

== Reception ==
The Christian Science Monitor called it "mildly diverting."

Diabolique magazine called it "terrific fun, a fast-paced, bright entertainment starring Louis Hayward as a gambler who poses as the son of a wealthy woman and gets involved in a murder case; the performances are full of energy, and it rockets along for its 67 minute running time. Lubin was coming into his own as director."
