= The Leather Pushers =

The Leather Pushers may refer to:

- The Leather Pushers (1922 serial), American silent film based on H. C. Witwer boxing stories
- The Leather Pushers (1940 film), American action comedy based on H. C. Witwer boxing stories
