= Behind the Mask (1946 film) =

1946 film

Behind The Mask
- Directed by: Phil Karlson
- Written by: Arthur Hoerl; George Callahan; Walter B. Gibson
- Produced by: Joe Kaufmann
- Starring: Kane Richmond; Barbara Read; Dorothea Kent
- Cinematography: William A. Sickner
- Edited by: Ace Herman
- Music by: Edward J. Kay
- Production company: Monogram Pictures
- Distributed by: Monogram Pictures
- Release date: May 25, 1946
- Running time: 67 minutes
- Country: United States
- Language: English

Behind The Mask is a 1946 American comedy mystery film directed by Phil Karlson and starring Kane Richmond, Barbara Read, George Chandler and Dorothea Kent. It was the second in a series of three films released by Monogram in 1946 starring Richmond as the crimefighter The Shadow, the others being The Shadow Returns and The Missing Lady.

== Plot ==
Lamont Cranston, alias The Shadow, has to clear his name of the murder of a blackmailing newspaper reporter by solving the crime himself.

== Cast ==
- Kane Richmond as Lamont Cranston (The Shadow)
- Barbara Read as Margo Lane
- George Chandler as Shrevvie
- Dorothea Kent as Jennie Delaney
- Joseph Crehan as Police Inspector Cardonna
- Pierre Watkin as Police Commissioner Weston
- Robert Shayne as Brad Thomas
- June Clyde as Edith Merrill
- James Cardwell as Jeff Marin
- Marjorie Hoshelle as Mae Bishop
- Joyce Compton as Lulu

== Reception ==
Film historian Larry Langman dismissed Behind the Mask as a "feeble entry in the Shadow mystery series". Critic Leonard Maltin gave the film a mixed review, describing it as a "decent low-budget whodunit" with "some nice visual touches but way too much 'comedy' relief."
