= For Me and My Gal =

For Me and My Gal can refer to:

- For Me and My Gal (film), a 1942 Judy Garland-Gene Kelly musical directed by Busby Berkeley
- "For Me and My Gal" (song), a 1917 popular standard song by George W. Meyer, Edgar Leslie, and E. Ray Goetz

== See also ==
- Me and My Gal, a 1932 romantic comedy/drama film directed by Raoul Walsh
- Me and My Girl, a 1937 musical
- Me and My Girl (TV series), a 1980s British sitcom
