= Pierre Watkin =

American actor (1887–1960)

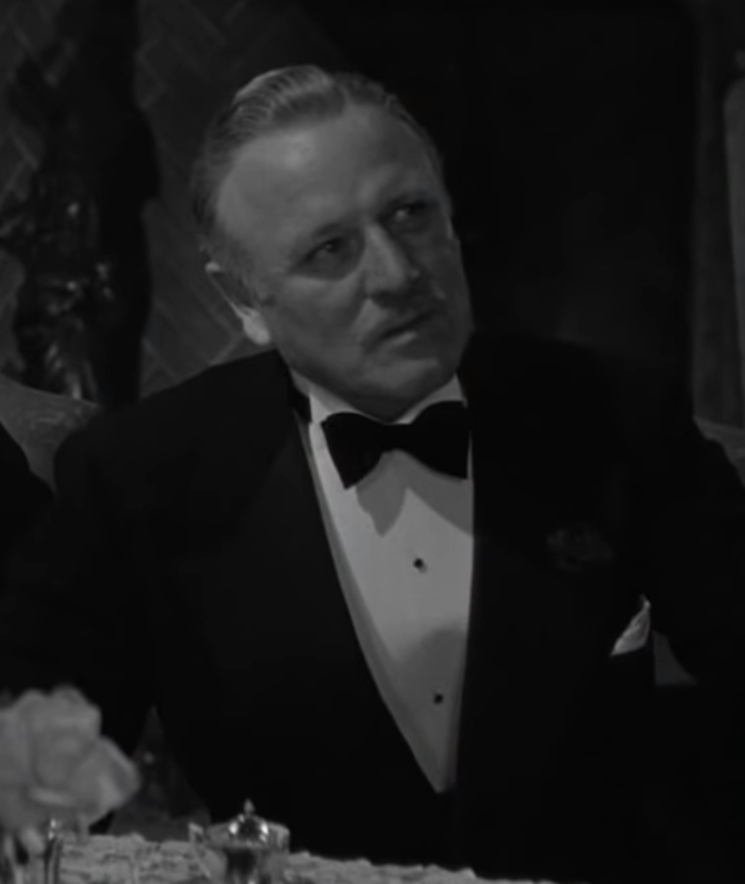
- Watkin in Meet John Doe (1941)
- Born: Pierre Frank Watkin; December 29, 1887; Afton Township, Cherokee County, Iowa, U.S.
- Died: February 3, 1960 (aged 72); Hollywood, California, U.S.
- Resting place: Valhalla Memorial Park, Burbank, California
- Occupation: Actor
- Years active: 1910–1960
- Spouses: Christie E. McLennan (m. 1909; died 1930) Mary Hart (m. 1932)

Pierre Frank Watkin (December 29, 1887 – February 3, 1960) was an American character actor best known for playing distinguished authority figures throughout the Golden Age of Hollywood. He is best remembered for his roles of Mr. Skinner the bank president in The Bank Dick (1940); Lou Gehrig's father-in-law Mr. Twitchell in Pride of the Yankees (1942); and the first actor to portray Perry White in the Superman serials Superman (1948) and Atom Man vs. Superman (1950).

== Early life ==
Watkin was born on December 29, 1887, in Afton Township, Iowa, the third of four sons born to Charles Henry Watkin and Elizabeth Jeannette (née Scoles) Watkin.

When Watkin was a young child, his family moved to Sioux City, Iowa, where his parents ran a boarding house for actors. This environment influenced Watkin to go into acting. When he was a teenager, the family moved to Kansas City, Missouri, where he began acting in theater.

== Career ==
Watkin began his career touring the Midwest with various theatrical troupes, including with the company of Morgan Wallace. In 1918, he formed his own theatrical troupe, the Pierre Watkin Players, which was first headquartered in Sioux City, before moving to Lincoln, Nebraska, in 1927. Among those in his troupe included Lyle Talbot (under his birth name "Lysle Talbot"); Georgia Neese Clark and her first husband George Clark; and Roy Hillard, the father of Harriet Nelson. However, the troupe disassembled when Watkin went East to pursue a Broadway career. The next year, Watkin made his made his Broadway debut in the 1928 play Possession.

Following a string of unsuccessful plays on Broadway, and with many actors moving out West, Watkin moved to California in 1935 to pursue a film career. Shortly after arriving, he made his film debut in the Bette Davis film Dangerous, having been offered a role by the film's director Alfred E. Green, an acquaintance of his from Broadway. Over his 25 year career, Watkin became well-known as a freelance actor, often appearing in bit roles — many uncredited — as wealthy distinguished authority figures such as bankers and judges. Watkin was a favorite of Davis and director Frank Capra, who dubbed Watkin his "one-man stock company". Although known as a character actor, he did obtain some major roles, such as bank president Mr. Skinner in The Bank Dick with W.C. Fields, and opposite Gary Cooper and Teresa Wright as Mr. Twitchell in the Lou Gehrig biographical drama film The Pride of the Yankees.

In 1940, Watkin made his first serial, portraying the main antagonist in the Universal film serial The Green Hornet Strikes Again!. Watkin would attain more prominent roles in film serials, such as the role of Uncle Jim Fairfield in the 1947 Columbia serial Jack Armstrong. The following year, the studio cast him in the role of Perry White in their adaption of Superman. The serial was a success, leading to Watkin reprising his role in a follow-up, Atom Man vs. Superman, in 1950. Watkin also received prominent roles from low-budget poverty row studios, appearing in several Western films for Republic Pictures.

At the turn of the decade, Watkin began to segue into television as the medium began gaining popularity. Watkin appeared in several series, such as The Lone Ranger, Cheyenne, The Jack Benny Program, The Adventures of Rin Tin Tin, and The George Burns and Gracie Allen Show. He also made an appearance on I Love Lucy in 1954, portraying book editor Mr. Dorrance in the episode "Lucy Writes a Novel". Watkin appeared as several minor characters in different episodes of Adventures of Superman. When producers were looking to revive the series after its cancellation in 1958, Watkin was cast in the role of Perry White again, replacing the late John Hamilton. However, these plans never came to fruition after the death of series star George Reeves in June 1959.

== Personal life ==
Watkin first married Christie E. McLennan on August 21, 1909, in Ottawa, Kansas; the two had met while they were a part of a troupe together. They remained married until her death on April 4, 1930. Watkin remarried Mary Hart in Reading, Pennsylvania on September 25, 1932.

Watkin died on February 3, 1960, at age 72, at his home in Hollywood, California, from pneumonia and complications of diabetes. He was buried in Valhalla Memorial Park Cemetery, Burbank, California.

== Filmography ==
Film
Year	Title	Role	Notes
1924	He Who Gets Slapped	Spectator	
1935	Dangerous	George Sheffield	
1935	If You Could Only Cook	Mr. Balderson	Uncredited
1936	Two in the Dark	City Editor	Uncredited
1936	You May Be Next	Bernard Pine	Uncredited
1936	It Had to Happen	District Attorney	
1936	Mr. Deeds Goes to Town	Arthur Cedar	Uncredited
1936	Forgotten Faces	Mr. McBride	
1936	Counterfeit	Matt McDonald	
1936	Nobody's Fool	George Baxter	
1936	Bunker Bean	Mr. Barnes	Uncredited
1936	China Clipper	Secretary of State	Uncredited
1936	The Gentleman from Louisiana	Roger Leland	
1936	Swing Time	Al Simpson	Uncredited
1936	Sitting on the Moon	Tucker	
1936	The Big Game	College Chancellor	Uncredited
1936	Under Your Spell	Allen's Lawyer	Uncredited
1936	Love Letters of a Star	Hobbs	
1936	Country Gentlemen	Mr. Grayson	
1936	Wanted! Jane Turner	Andrew Norris	Uncredited
1936	King of Hockey	Thomas A. White	Uncredited
1937	Larceny on the Air	Kennedy	
1937	Dangerous Number	Mr. Stark	Uncredited
1937	The Devil's Playground	Submarine Commander	
1937	She's Dangerous	H.J. Conrad	Uncredited
1937	Breezing Home	Steward	Uncredited
1937	Green Light	Dr. Booth	
1937	Sea Devils	USS Taroe Commander	
1937	History Is Made at Night	Commodore Eldridge	Uncredited
1937	Bill Cracks Down	William "Bill" Reardon, Sr.	
1937	Waikiki Wedding	John Durkin	Uncredited
1937	Racketeers in Exile	Chief G-Man	Uncredited
1937	Marked Woman	Judge at 2nd trial	Uncredited
1937	Internes Can't Take Money	Dr. Fearson	
1937	Mountain Justice	The Governor	Uncredited
1937	The Hit Parade	J.B. Hawley	
1937	Michael O'Halloran	Mark Grave	
1937	The Go Getter	Browne	
1937	Married Before Breakfast	Mr. Potter	Uncredited
1937	Ever Since Eve	Barton	
1937	The Singing Marine	General	
1937	The Californian	Miller	
1937	Paradise Isle	Steinmeyer	
1937	The Life of Emile Zola	Prefect of Police	Uncredited
1937	Reported Missing	Reynolds	Uncredited
1937	Confession	Lawyer Stagoff	Uncredited
1937	The Man Who Cried Wolf	The Governor	Uncredited
1937	Stage Door	Richard Carmichael	
1937	Breakfast for Two	Gordon Faraday	
1937	Thoroughbreds Don't Cry	Judge Dobson	Uncredited
1937	Daughter of Shanghai	Mr. Yorkland	Uncredited
1937	Rosalie	Academy Superintendent	Uncredited
1938	Midnight Intruder	Peter Winslow	
1938	Arsène Lupin Returns	Mr. Carter	Uncredited
1938	Dangerous to Know	Senator Carson	Uncredited
1938	State Police	Colonel C.B. Clarke	
1938	Mr. Moto's Gamble	District Attorney	
1938	Tip-Off Girls	George Murkil	
1938	There's Always a Woman	Mr. Ketterling	
1938	A Trip to Paris	Baxter	Uncredited
1938	The Chaser	Mr. Beaumont	
1938	Smashing the Rackets	John Nelson Davis	Uncredited
1938	Boy Meets Girl	B.K. Whitacre	Uncredited
1938	You Can't Take It with You	Kirby's Attorney	Uncredited
1938	Valley of the Giants	Banker #2	Uncredited
1938	Mr. Doodle Kicks Off	Mr. Wondel	Uncredited
1938	King of Alcatraz	Ship Doctor	Uncredited
1938	Girls' School	Mr. Simpson	
1938	The Mad Miss Manton	Mr. Fenton	Uncredited
1938	The Lady Objects	Mr. Harper	
1938	Young Dr. Kildare	Robert Candler	
1938	Girls on Probation	Mr. Storm	Uncredited
1938	Illegal Traffic	Jigger	
1938	There's That Woman Again	Mr. Nacelle	
1939	King of the Underworld	District Attorney	
1939	The Mysterious Miss X	Winslow	
1939	Risky Business	Abernathy	
1939	Off the Record	Barton	
1939	Wings of the Navy	Captain March	
1939	Fast and Loose	Victor Stockton	Uncredited
1939	Secret Service of the Air	Chief Morrow	Uncredited
1939	The Spirit of Culver	Captain Wharton	
1939	King of Chinatown	District Attorney Philips	Uncredited
1939	The Adventures of Jane Arden	Albert Thayer	
1939	Society Lawyer	Henry V. Adams	
1939	They Made Her a Spy	Colonel Wilson	
1939	First Offenders	Mr. Blakeley	
1939	Outside These Walls	Hewitt Bronson	
1939	The Jones Family in Hollywood	Producer	
1939	Wall Street Cowboy	Roger Hammond	
1939	Death of a Champion	Albert Deacon	
1939	Everything's on Ice	Hotel Manager	
1939	Mr. Smith Goes to Washington	Senate Minority Leader (Senator Barnes)	
1939	Rulers of the Sea	Mr. Caldwell	Uncredited
1939	The Covered Trailer	Horace Cartwright	
1939	Geronimo	Colonel White	
1939	The Great Victor Herbert	Albert Martin	
1940	The Earl of Chicago	Warden	Uncredited
1940	Road to Singapore	Morgan Wycott	Uncredited
1940	Gangs of Chicago	Shady Businessman	Uncredited
1940	The Saint Takes Over	Ben Eagan	
1940	Earthbound	President of the Court	Uncredited
1940	Queen of the Mob	Torey	Uncredited
1940	Out West with the Peppers	Mr. King	
1940	Sailor's Lady	Captain	
1940	Golden Gloves	A.P. Barton	Uncredited
1940	Mystery Sea Raider	Straker	Uncredited
1940	I Love You Again	Mr. Sims	
1940	Captain Caution	American Consul	
1940	Rhythm on the River	Uncle John	Uncredited
1940	Five Little Peppers in Trouble	Mr. King	
1940	Hired Wife	Charlie	Uncredited
1940	No Time for Comedy	First-Nighter	Uncredited
1940	Yesterday's Heroes	Harvey Mason	
1940	Knute Rockne All American	Hearing Commissioner	Uncredited
1940	Life with Henry	Mr. Anderson	
1940	Street of Memories	Dr. Thornton	
1940	Father Is a Prince	Mr. Lee	
1940	The Bank Dick	Mr. Skinner	
1940	Dr. Kildare's Crisis	Robert Chandler	Uncredited
1940	The Green Hornet Strikes Again!	Boss Crogan	Serial
1941	Cheers for Miss Bishop	President Crowder	
1941	Petticoat Politics	Alfred Wilcox	
1941	The Trial of Mary Dugan	Judge Nash	
1941	A Man Betrayed	Governor	
1941	Meet John Doe	Hammett	
1941	She Knew All the Answers	George Wharton	
1941	Adventure in Washington	Frank Conroy	
1941	Naval Academy	Captain Davis	
1941	For Beauty's Sake	Middlesex	
1941	Nevada City	Amos Norton	
1941	The Big Store	Bedding Department Manager	Uncredited
1941	Cracked Nuts	Mr. Benson	Uncredited
1941	Life Begins for Andy Hardy	Bob Waggoner	Uncredited
1941	Dr. Kildare's Wedding Day	Robert Chandler	Uncredited
1941	Unfinished Business	Lawyer	Uncredited
1941	Father Takes a Wife	William "Bill" Fowler	Uncredited
1941	Lydia	Speaker	Uncredited
1941	Buy Me That Town	Carlton Williams	
1941	Great Guns	Colonel Wayburn	
1941	Jesse James at Bay	Phineas Krager	
1941	Ellery Queen and the Murder Ring	Crothers	
1941	Bedtime Story	Eccles	Uncredited
1942	Lady for a Night	District Attorney Logan	Uncredited
1942	Nazi Agent	Grover Blaine McHenry	
1942	Obliging Young Lady	John Markham	
1942	The Adventures of Martin Eden	Amos Morley	
1942	Heart of the Rio Grande	Randolph Lane	
1942	Yokel Boy	Johnson	
1942	We Were Dancing	Tom Bentley	Uncredited
1942	Meet the Stewarts	Lunch Guest	Uncredited
1942	The Magnificent Dope	Bill Carson	
1942	The Pride of the Yankees	Mr. Twitchell	
1942	Wildcat	Banker	Uncredited
1942	Stand By All Networks	Grant Neeley	
1942	Secrets of the Underground	District Attorney Winton	Uncredited
1942	Ice-Capades Revue	Wiley Stone	
1942	Whistling in Dixie	Doctor	
1943	Cinderella Swings It	Brock Harris	
1943	It Ain't Hay	Major Harper	Uncredited
1943	Mission to Moscow	Naval Attache	Uncredited
1943	A Stranger in Town	Supreme Court Justice	Uncredited
1943	Du Barry Was a Lady	Ambrose	Uncredited
1943	Good Luck, Mr. Yates	Enlistment Officer	Uncredited
1943	This Is the Army	Audience Member	Uncredited
1943	Destroyer	Admiral	Uncredited
1943	Fired Wife	Doctor	Uncredited
1943	Swing Shift Maisie	Judge	
1943	Crazy House	Prosecutor	Uncredited
1943	The Iron Major	Colonel White	Uncredited
1943	The Chance of a Lifetime	Governor Rutledge	Uncredited
1943	Riding High	Masters	Uncredited
1943	Jack London	American Consul	Uncredited
1943	What a Woman!	Senator	Uncredited
1943	How to Operate Behind Enemy Lines	British Agent Z	Uncredited
1944	Weekend Pass	John James "J.J." Kendall	
1944	My Best Gal		Uncredited
1944	Bermuda Mystery	Herbert Bond	
1944	Once Upon a Time	Radio Stage Manager	Uncredited
1944	Ladies of Washington	Dr. John Crane	Uncredited
1944	Jungle Woman	Dr. Meredith	
1944	South of Dixie	Dean Williamson	
1944	Wing and a Prayer	Admiral	Uncredited
1944	Atlantic City	Senator Hodges	
1944	Three Little Sisters	Mr. Davenport	Uncredited
1944	Oh, What a Night!	Tom Gordon	
1944	Shadow of Suspicion	Frank J. Randall	
1944	End of the Road	District Attorney	
1944	Dead Man's Eyes	Attorney	
1944	The Great Mike	Colonel Whitley	
1944	Meet Miss Bobby Socks	Quinlan	
1945	She Gets Her Man	Johnson	Uncredited
1945	Roughly Speaking	Financier	Uncredited
1945	Here Come the Co-Eds	Police Chief	Uncredited
1945	Docks of New York	Captain Jacobs	
1945	Keep Your Powder Dry	Mr. Lorrison	
1945	Strange Illusion	Wallace Armstrong	
1945	I'll Remember April	Dr. Armitage	
1945	The Phantom Speaks	Charlie Davis	
1945	Honeymoon Ahead	Warden Lawlor	Uncredited
1945	Three's a Crowd	Marcus Pett	
1945	Thrill of a Romance	Tycoon	Uncredited
1945	I'll Tell the World	Dr. Mullins	
1945	Mr. Muggs Rides Again	Dr. Fletcher	
1945	Over 21	Joel I. Nixon	Uncredited
1945	Incendiary Blonde	Otto Hummel	Uncredited
1945	Secrets of a Sorority Girl	Dr. Harlan Johnson	
1945	Divorce	John B. Carter	
1945	I Love a Bandleader	Dr. Gardiner	
1945	Apology for Murder	Craig Jordan	
1945	Dakota	Wexton Geary	
1945	Captain Tugboat Annie	Dr. Turner	
1945	Follow That Woman	J.B. Henderson	
1945	The Stork Club	Mr. Gray	Uncredited
1945	Adventure	Mr. Buckley	Uncredited
1946	Shock	Hotel Manager	Uncredited
1946	Miss Susie Slagle's	Superintendent	Uncredited
1946	The Shadow Returns	Police Commissioner J.R. Weston	Uncredited
1946	The Madonna's Secret	District Attorney	
1946	Little Giant	P.S. Van Loon	
1946	Claudia and David	Hartley Naughton	Uncredited
1946	I Ring Doorbells	G.B. Barton	
1946	Murder Is My Business	Arnold Ramsey	
1946	The Kid from Brooklyn	E. Winthrop LeMoyne	Uncredited
1946	So Goes My Love	Committee Man	Uncredited
1946	Behind the Mask	Police Commissioner Weston	
1946	Our Hearts Were Growing Up	Producer	Uncredited
1946	G.I. War Brides	Editor	
1946	The Missing Lady	Police Commissioner Weston	
1946	Earl Carroll Sketchbook	John Clark	
1946	Swamp Fire	P.T. Hilton	
1946	High School Hero	Governor Huffington	
1946	Two Years Before the Mast	Staunton	Uncredited
1946	Plainsman and the Lady	Senator Allen	Uncredited
1946	Sioux City Sue	G.W. Rhodes	
1946	Magnificent Doll	Harper	Uncredited
1947	The Shocking Miss Pilgrim	Wendell Paige	Uncredited
1947	Jack Armstrong	Uncle Jim Fairfield	Serial
1947	Cigarette Girl	District Attorney	Uncredited
1947	The Ghost Goes Wild	Murgatroyd	Uncredited
1947	Monsieur Verdoux	Prison Official	Uncredited
1947	Violence	Ralph Borden	
1947	Danger Street	Turlock's Publisher Friend	Uncredited
1947	Hard Boiled Mahoney	Dr. Rolfe Carter	
1947	The Web	Mr. Porter	Uncredited
1947	Seven Keys to Baldpate	Mr. Bentley	Uncredited
1947	Living in a Big Way	Hausman	Uncredited
1947	The Red Stallion	Richard Moresby	
1947	The Secret Life of Walter Mitty	Reverend	Uncredited
1947	The Wild Frontier	Marshal Frank Lane	
1947	Song of Love	Duke of X	Uncredited
1947	The Fabulous Texan	Citizen	Uncredited
1947	Beyond Our Own	Dr. Blake	
1947	Her Husband's Affairs	Vice President Beitler	
1947	Road to the Big House		Uncredited
1947	Brick Bradford	Professor Salisbury	Serial
1948	Glamour Girl	T.J. Hopkins	
1948	Mary Lou	Airline President	
1948	B.F.'s Daughter	Joe Stewart	Uncredited
1948	The Hunted	Simon Rand	
1948	State of the Union	Senator Lauterback	
1948	Money Madness	Judge	Uncredited
1948	Trapped by Boston Blackie	Dunn	Uncredited
1948	The Counterfeiters	Carter	
1948	Shanghai Chest	Judge Wesley Armstrong	
1948	Superman	Perry White	Serial
1948	Daredevils of the Clouds	Douglas Harrison	
1948	The Arkansas Swing	Horse Vet	
1948	Fighting Back	Colonel	
1948	A Southern Yankee	Major	(scenes deleted)
1948	Lady at Midnight	John Featherstone	Uncredited
1948	The Gentleman from Nowhere	Hoffman	Uncredited
1948	An Innocent Affair	T.D. Hendricks	
1948	The Strange Mrs. Crane	Clinton Crane	
1948	The Gallant Blade	Governor	Uncredited
1948	Incident	C.W. Sloan	
1949	Alaska Patrol	Mr. Sigmund	
1949	Siren of Atlantis	Colonel	
1949	Slightly French	Publicity Man	Uncredited
1949	Miss Mink of 1949	Cranston	Uncredited
1949	Knock on Any Door	Purcell	Uncredited
1949	El Paso	Mr. Seton	Uncredited
1949	Make Believe Ballroom	Program Director	Uncredited
1949	Tulsa	Winters	Uncredited
1949	Flamingo Road	Senator on Power Commission	Uncredited
1949	Neptune's Daughter	Mr. Canford	Uncredited
1949	Look for the Silver Lining	Theater Goer	Uncredited
1949	The Fountainhead	Cortlandt Official	Uncredited
1949	Hold That Baby!	John Winston	
1949	Barbary Pirate	John Adams	Uncredited
1949	Zamba	Benton	
1949	Mary Ryan, Detective	Commissioner Ward	Uncredited
1949	The Story of Seabiscuit	Charles S. Howard	
1949	Samson and Delilah	2nd Priest of Dagon	Uncredited
1949	Life of St. Paul Series	Caiaphas	
1950	Blue Grass of Kentucky	Head Steward	
1950	Radar Secret Service	Mr. Hamilton	
1950	Key to the City	Mayor Cabot	Uncredited
1950	Nancy Goes to Rio	Michael	Uncredited
1950	Over the Border	Rand Malloy	
1950	Rock Island Trail	Major	
1950	Shadow on the Wall	Dr. Dan Hodge	Uncredited
1950	The Big Hangover	Samuel C. Lang	
1950	Three Little Words	Philip Goodman	Uncredited
1950	Atom Man vs. Superman	Perry White	Serial
1950	Redwood Forest Trail	Arthur Cameron	
1950	Sunset in the West	Gordon MacKnight	
1950	Last of the Buccaneers	Governor Claiborne	Uncredited
1950	Emergency Wedding	Doctor	Uncredited
1950	Southside 1-1000	Police Commissioner	
1950	Frontier Outpost	Colonel Warrick	Uncredited
1950	The Second Face	Mr. Hamilton	
1950	The Du Pont Story	Colonel Henry du Pont	
1951	Two Lost Worlds	Magistrate Jeffries	
1951	Belle Le Grand	Parkington's Associate	Uncredited
1951	In Old Amarillo	George B. Hills	
1951	Mysterious Island	Confederate Officer	Serial, Uncredited
1952	Scandal Sheet	Baxter	Uncredited
1952	Hold That Line	Morgan T. Stanhope	
1952	A Yank in Indo-China	Kingston	
1952	Lovely to Look At	Prospective Investor	Uncredited
1952	Thundering Caravans	Head Marshal	
1952	Francis Goes to West Point	Colonel Hedley	Uncredited
1953	The Lost Planet	Ned Hilton	Serial
1953	Canadian Mounties vs. Atomic Invaders	Commissioner Morrison	Serial, [Chs.1,10-12]
1953	The Stranger Wore a Gun	Jason Conroy	
1953	The Flaming Urge	Albert Cruickshank	
1954	Johnny Dark	Ed J. Winston	
1954	About Mrs. Leslie	Lewis	
1955	The Eternal Sea	General	Uncredited
1955	The Big Bluff	Winthrop	
1955	Lay That Rifle Down	Mr. Coswell	Uncredited
1955	Creature with the Atom Brain	Mayor Bremer	
1955	Sudden Danger	George Caldwell	
1956	The Maverick Queen	McMillan	
1956	Thunder Over Arizona	Dr. E. Peterson	Uncredited
1956	Cha-Cha-Cha Boom!	Investor	Uncredited
1956	Shake, Rattle & Rock!	Armstrong	
1956	Don't Knock the Rock	Mayor George Bagley	
1957	Spook Chasers	Dr. Moss	
1957	Calypso Heat Wave	Thornwall	Uncredited
1957	Pal Joey	Mr. Forsythe	Scenes deleted
1958	Marjorie Morningstar	Civil Official	Uncredited
1958	High School Confidential	David Wingate	Uncredited
1958	The Challenge of Rin Tin Tin		
1958	It! The Terror from Beyond Space	Spokesman	Uncredited
1959	The Flying Fontaines	Doctor	Uncredited

Television
Year	Title	Role	Notes
1950	The Silver Theatre		Episode: "Bad Guy"
1950	Colgate Theatre		Episode: "Satan's Waitin'"
1950	The Cisco Kid	Various roles	3 episodes
1950-1951	Dick Tracy	Police Chief Pat Patton	Recurring role; 4 episodes
1950-1955	The Lone Ranger	Various roles	6 episodes
1951	Amos 'n' Andy	Traffic Court Judge #1	Episode: "Traffic Violation"
1951-1953	Racket Squad	Various roles	3 episodes
1951-1955	The George Burns and Gracie Allen Show	Various roles	5 episodes
1952	The Range Rider	Dr. Chancellor; Dad Harris	Episode: "Blind Canyon"; Episode: "The Bandit Stallion"
1952	The Gene Autry Show	Colonel; Sheriff	Episode: "Blazeaway"; Episode: "Six Gun Romeo"
1952	The Unexpected	J.B. Crane	Episode: "Split Second"
1952	Life with Luigi		Episode: "Citizenship"
1952	Boston Blackie		Episode: "Black Widow"
1952-53	The Roy Rogers Show	Prescott; Professor Petrie	Episode: "Peril from the Past"; Episode: "Outlaws of Paradise Valley"
1952-53	Fireside Theatre	Various roles	4 episodes
1952-1958	Adventures of Superman	Various roles	4 episodes
1952-1958	The Jack Benny Program	Various roles	5 episodes
1952-1958	Sky King	Various roles	3 episodes
1953	Chevron Theatre		Episode: "Goodbye to the Clown"
1953	Your Favorite Story		Episode: "A Tale of Negative Gravity"
1953	Hopalong Cassidy	Henry Warren	Episode: "Frontier Law"
1953	The Adventures of Kit Carson	Sheriff	Episode: "Ambush"
1953-1954	The Ford Television Theatre	Various roles	3 episodes
1953-1956	The Adventures of Wild Bill Hickok	Porter; Dr. Wells	Episode: "Grandpa and Genie"; Episode: "The Missing Diamonds"
1954	I Love Lucy	Mr. Dorrance	Episode: "Lucy Writes a Novel"
1954	Duffy's Tavern	Fenston	Episode: "The Heir"
1954	Captain Midnight	Dr. Morgan	Episode: "The Deadly Project"
1954	The Red Skelton Show		Episode: "The Cop and the Anthem"
1954-1955	Public Defender	Dr. Morse; Chester Lamont	Episode: "Color Blind"; Episode: "Gunpoint"
1954-1957	Lux Video Theatre	Various roles	4 episodes
1954-1957	The Adventures of Rin Tin Tin	Dr. Hyer	Recurring role; 4 episodes
1955	Stories of the Century	Judge Isaac C. Parker	Uncredited; Episode: "Cherokee Bill"
1955	The Whistler	Roarke	Episode: "Favor for a Friend"
1955	The Pepsi-Cola Playhouse		Episode: "The Quiet Wife"
1955	City Detective	Davis	Episode: "The Hypnotic Wife"
1955	Schlitz Playhouse of Stars	J. Harrison Hardesty	Episode: "Visitor in the Night"
1955	The Eddie Cantor Comedy Theatre		Episode: "The Wizard"
1955	Front Row Center	Hatfield	Episode: "Dinner at Eight"
1955	Damon Runyon Theater		Episode: "The Mink Doll"
1955	The Man Behind the Badge	Tremont	Episode: "The Case of the Phoney Paper"
1955	Four Star Playhouse	Mr. Morgan	Episode: "Let the Chips Fall"
1955	Climax!	Family Friend	Uncredited; Episode: "A Promise to Murder"
1955	Fury	Ellis	Episode: "Joey and the Gypsies"
1955-1956	Brave Eagle	Colonel Matt Matthews; Colonel Bond	Episode: "Moonfire"; Episode: "Death Trap"
1955-1956	TV Reader's Digest	Various roles	3 episodes
1955-1956	Annie Oakley	Henry Lormier; Reverend Mills	Episode: "Dead Man's Stuff"; Episode: "The Reckless Press"
1955-1957	The Millionaire	Jonathan Jeffries; Governor	Episode: "The Margaret Browning Story"; Episode: "The Hugh Waring Story"
1955-1958	December Bride	Various roles	3 episodes
1956	The Count of Monte Cristo	Charcot	Episode: "Return to the Chateau D'if
1956	Jungle Jim	Horatio Erskine	Episode: "Power of Darkness"
1956	It's a Great Life	Jason; General	Episode: "Screen Test"; Episode: "Old Soldiers Never Die"
1956	Cheyenne	The Colonel; Harvey Sinclair	Episode: "Decision" (uncredited); Episode: "The Law Man"
1956	The Adventures of Dr. Fu Manchu	Secretary of Commerce	Episode: "The Satellites of Dr. Fu Manchu"
1956	Alfred Hitchcock Presents	Porter	Season 2 Episode 9: "Crack of Doom"
1956	The Bob Hope Show	Himself	Episode: "The Awful Truth" (March 21)
1957	Crossroads	Judge Richter; Governor	Episode: "Call for Help"; Episode: "Convict 1321, Age 21"
1957	The Sheriff of Cochise	Judge	Episode: "Stepfather"
1957	The Gale Storm Show		Episode: "For Money or Love"
1957	Sergeant Preston of the Yukon	Inspector	Episode: "The Jailbreaker"
1957	Tales of Wells Fargo	Doctor	Episode: "Laredo"
1957-1958	Perry Mason	Judge Keetley	Recurring role; 3 episodes
1957-1958	The Restless Gun	Various roles	3 episodes
1957-1959	Highway Patrol	Thomas Corbin; Mr. Larson	Episode: "Dead Hunter"; Episode: "Diversion Robbery"
1958	Death Valley Days	David Dows	Episode: "Empire of Youth"
1958	Colt .45	Colonel Duncan	Episode: "Decoy"
1958	The Life of Riley	Teasdale	Episode: "The Letter"
1958	The Life and Legend of Wyatt Earp	Colonel Bankhead	Episode: "When Sherman Marched Through Kansas"
1958	Dragnet		Episode: "The Big Eyes"
1958	Frontier Doctor	Dr. Breen	Episode: "San Francisco Story"
1958	Tales of the Texas Rangers	Ross Oliver	Episode: "Jace and Clay"
1959	The Lucy–Desi Comedy Hour	Mr. Robinson	Episode: "Lucy Wants a Career"
1959	Tombstone Territory	Mr. Starr	Episode: "The Black Diamond"
1959	Bronco	Judge Blair	Episode: "Bodyguard"
1960	77 Sunset Strip	Plastics Executive	Uncredited; Episode: "Collector's Item"
1960	Bat Masterson	Judge Smith	Episode: "A Picture of Death"
1960	Wagon Train	Doctor Samuel Caldwell	Uncredited; Episode: "The Larry Hanify Story"
1960	Wanted Dead or Alive	Dr. Bowers	Episode: "Jason", (final appearance)
