= Barbara Read =

Canadian-American actress

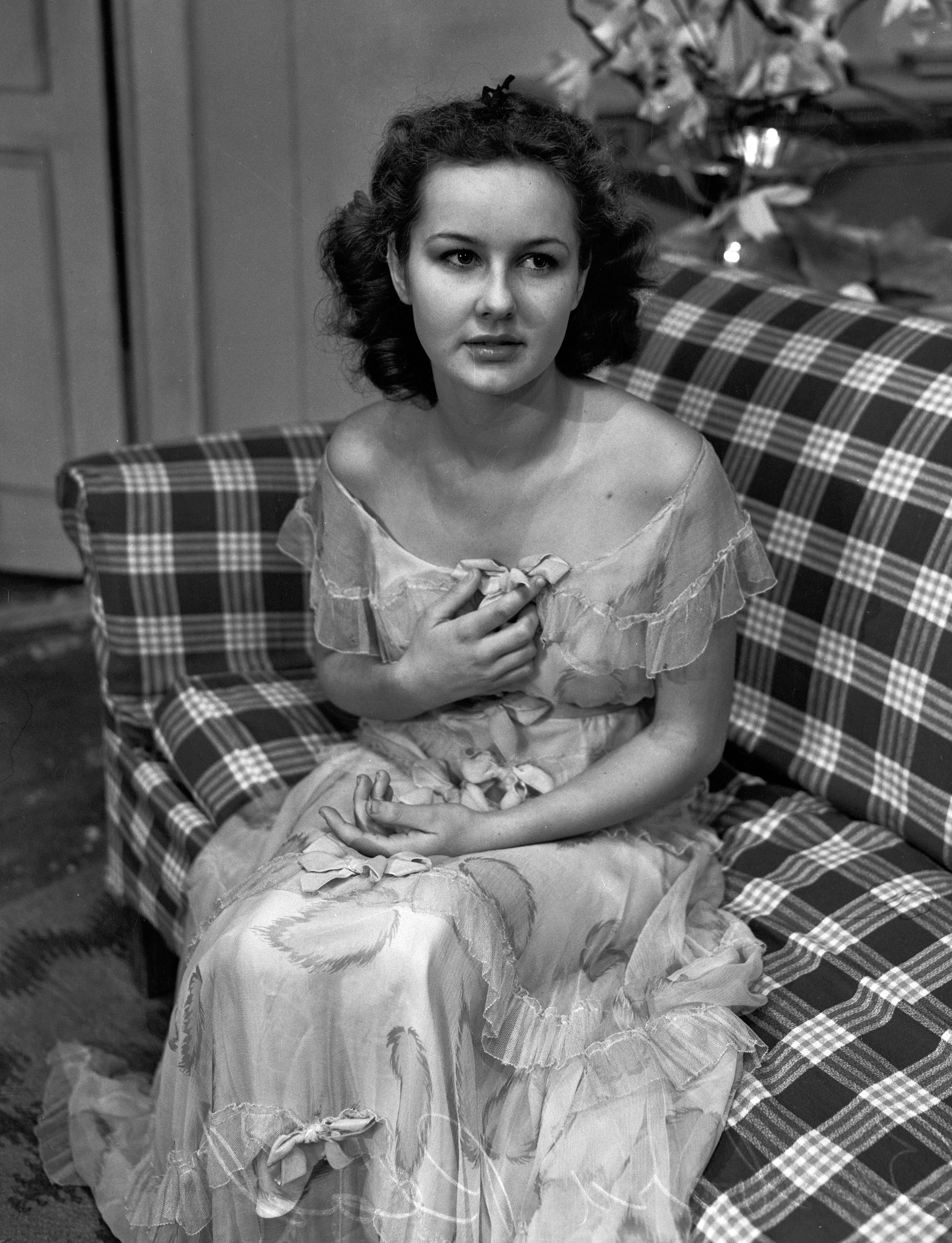
- Read at age 18
- Born: Barbara French Read; December 29, 1917; Port Arthur, Ontario, Canada
- Died: December 12, 1963 (aged 45); Laguna Beach, California, U.S.
- Occupation: Actress
- Years active: 1936–1948
- Known for: Three Smart Girls; The Missing Lady
- Spouse(s): William Paul III (1936–1936) (divorced); Bill Josephy (1947–1951) (2 children) (divorced); William Talman (1953–1960) (divorced) (2 children)

Barbara French Read, also known as Barbara Reed, (December 29, 1917 – December 12, 1963) was a Canadian-American film actress of the 1930s and 1940s, who appeared in 21 films during her career.

== Early life ==
Born Barbara French Read on December 29, 1917, the daughter of contractor John Howard Read and Nancy Elizabeth Collier, in Port Arthur, Ontario. Read moved to California in the mid-1930s. She got her first movie contract while living in Laguna Beach, California, she was watching a film production in Laguna when she was spotted and offered a screen test, after which she entered a six-month contract with the production company. When she failed to receive any roles because of her lack of experience, she joined the Laguna Beach Players theater, where she acted in a new play each month for two years.

== Film career ==
Her first film appearance was one of the three principal girls in the 1936 comedy film Three Smart Girls, which also starred Deanna Durbin and Nan Grey. From 1937 through 1939, Read appeared in nine films, most notably starring in The Spellbinder, opposite Lee Tracy. From 1940 through 1948, she appeared in 11 films. Her most remembered role was that of Margo Lane, portrayed in three films from The Shadow series, starring opposite Kane Richmond. She and Richmond teamed together in The Shadow Returns, Behind the Mask, and The Missing Lady, all in 1946. Her last role was alongside Randolph Scott and Marguerite Chapman in the 1948 Western Coroner Creek.

== Personal life ==
In September 1936, Read eloped to Mexico with a young artist named William Paul III, but they divorced two months later. Read married talent agent Bill Josephy in Santa Barbara on December 27, 1947. They had two boys, Damon Josephy and Quentin Josephy. She married actor William Talman in 1953 and had one daughter, Barbie, and one son, William Whitney Talman III. The couple divorced on August 23, 1960.

== Suicide and death ==
She died by suicide on December 11, 1963 at her Laguna Beach (CA) home when she turned on the gas jets of her stove and sealed the doors and windows. She left a note blaming "ill health".

== Selected filmography ==
Year	Title	Role	Notes
1936	Three Smart Girls	Kay Craig	
1937	The Man Who Cried Wolf	Nan	
1937	Merry-Go-Round of 1938	Clarice Stockbridge	
1937	The Road Back	Lucie	
1937	Make Way for Tomorrow	Rhoda Cooper	
1937	The Mighty Treve	Aileen Fenno	
1938	The Crime of Doctor Hallet	Claire Saunders	
1938	Midnight Intruder	Patricia Hammond	
1939	The Spellbinder	Janet Marlowe	
1939	Sorority House	Dotty Spencer	
1940	Married and in Love	Helen Yates	
1940	Curtain Call	Helen Middleton	
1942	Rubber Racketeers	Mary Dale	
1942	Too Many Women	Linda Pearson	
1946	The Shadow Returns	Margo Lane	
1946	The Missing Lady	Margo Lane	
1946	Death Valley	Mitzi	
1946	Behind the Mask	Margo Lane	
1946	Ginger	Peggy Sullivan	
1947	Key Witness	Martha Higby	
1948	Coroner Creek	Abbe Miles	
