= Born to Be Bad (1934 film) =

1934 film by Lowell Sherman

- Film poster
- Directed by: Lowell Sherman
- Written by: Ralph Graves (story and screenplay); Harrison Jacobs (continuity)
- Produced by: Darryl F. Zanuck
- Starring: Loretta Young; Cary Grant; Jackie Kelk; Marion Burns
- Cinematography: Barney McGill
- Edited by: Maurice Wright
- Music by: Alfred Newman
- Production company: Twentieth Century Pictures
- Distributed by: United Artists
- Release date: May 18, 1934
- Running time: 62 minutes
- Country: United States
- Language: English
- Budget: $250,000

Born to Be Bad is a 1934 American pre-Code drama film starring Loretta Young and Cary Grant, and directed by Lowell Sherman.

This film was rejected by the Hays Office twice before it was finally approved. Young's character, an unwed mother who entertains wholesale buyers to secure contracts for her friend, had to be re-written and re-filmed, so that her occupation is only hinted at. Zanuck had to cut as much as possible shots of Young in her underwear and of her legs exposed to the hips. The box-office return was poor, with a loss of $50,000.

== Plot ==
Letty Strong becomes pregnant at the age of fifteen and runs away from home. She is eventually taken in by an elderly man named Fuzzy. In due course, Strong gives birth to Mickey in the back room of Fuzzy's bookstore. Surviving life as a grifter, Letty teaches her son to be streetwise, so that he will not be mistreated like she was. All the while, Fuzzy strongly disapproves of how Letty is raising her son. At age seven, Mickey decides to skip school and wander aimlessly around town. Meanwhile, Letty earns a living by entertaining buyers in order to prop up her friend Steve Karns.

One day a milk truck driven by Malcolm "Mal" Trevor hits Mickey as he is roller-skating in the street. When Letty's acquired lawyer, Adolphe, learns that Mal is the wealthy president of Amalgamated Dairies, he talks Letty into seizing the opportunity. Both Adolphe and Letty convince Mickey to lie about the extent of his injuries. However, during the trial, Mal's attorney produces films showing a fully recovered Mickey. The irate judge has Mickey taken from Letty and put in an institution for boys. Mal and his wife Alyce have no children. Mal adopts Mickey, with Letty's approval. She is able to visit with her son frequently. Mickey thrives on Mal's country estate, as he was in a stable, loving environment.

Letty is not satisfied with this arrangement and wants her son back. At Adolphe's suggestion, Letty seduces Mal into falling in love with her, while making audio recordings. Since her objective is the return of her son Mickey, Letty has no love for Mal, but he falls for her and they spend the night together. However, the next morning Mal informs a surprised Letty that he has already told his wife about their affair. Alyce is willing to sacrifice herself for Mal's happiness. Letty comes to a realization of her true feelings for Mal, and breaks off the relationship, all the while pretending to have only been toying with him. Leaving Mickey behind, she returns to Fuzzy and asks for her old job back at the bookstore.

== Cast ==
- Loretta Young as Letty Strong
- Cary Grant as Malcolm "Mal" Trevor
- Jackie Kelk as Mickey Strong
- Marion Burns as Alyce Trevor
- Henry Travers as Fuzzy
- Paul Harvey as Attorney Brian
- Russell Hopton as Steve Karns
- Etienne Girardot as J. K. Brown - Claim Adjustor
- Geneva Mitchell as Miss Crawford - Malcolm's Secretary
- Guy Usher as Judge McAffee
- Charles Coleman as Trevor's Butler
- Wade Boteler as Guard at Trevor Estate
- Harry Green as Adolphe - Letty's Lawyer
