= Anything for a Thrill =

1937 film directed by Leslie Goodwins

- Theatrical release poster
- Directed by: Leslie Goodwins
- Screenplay by: Joseph O'Donnell; Stanley Lowenstein
- Based on: To Him Who Dares by Peter B. Kyne
- Produced by: Maurice Conn
- Starring: Frankie Darro; Kane Richmond; June Johnson; Ann Evers; Johnstone White; Horace Murphy
- Cinematography: Jack Greenhalgh
- Edited by: Richard G. Wray
- Production company: Conn Pictures Corporation
- Distributed by: Conn Pictures Corporation
- Release date: June 15, 1937
- Running time: 59 minutes
- Country: United States
- Language: English

Anything for a Thrill is a 1937 American crime film directed by Leslie Goodwins and written by Joseph O'Donnell and Stanley Lowenstein. The film stars Frankie Darro, Kane Richmond, June Johnson, Ann Evers, Johnstone White and Horace Murphy. The film was released on June 15, 1937, by Conn Pictures Corporation.

== Cast ==
- Frankie Darro as Dan Mallory
- Kane Richmond as Cliff Mallory
- June Johnson as Jean Roberts
- Ann Evers as Betty Kelley
- Johnstone White as Burke
- Horace Murphy as Mr. Kelley
- Edward Hearn as Collins
- Frank Marlowe as Joe
- Bob Kortman as Henchman
- Charles Dorety as Charlie
- Charles McAvoy as Guard

== Critical reception ==
Variety dismissed the film as a "lightweight effort" that was unable to overcome the "improbabilities" of its storyline. The reviewer was equally unimpressed by the performances, and wrote, "Frankie Darrow and June Johnson, the precocious urchins, give slapbang stock performances. Kane Richmond is of understudy calibre as the hero, while Ann Evers is a looker who gets no chance to show if she can act."
