= William H. Strauss =

American actor

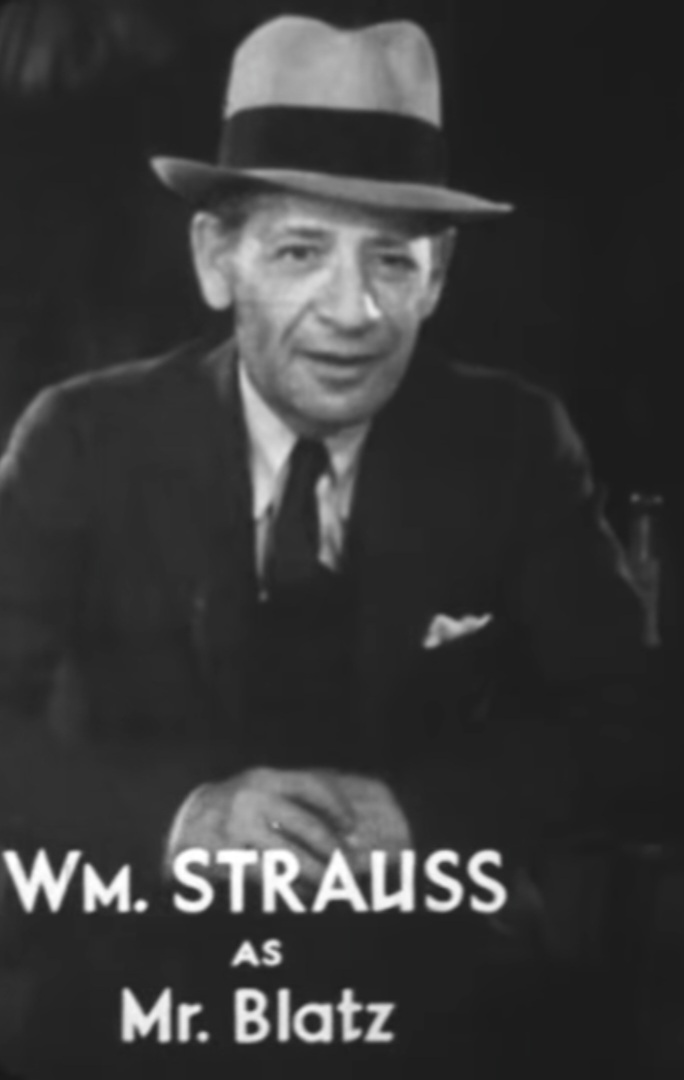
- Strauss in The Reckless Way (1936)
- Born: June 13, 1885; New York, New York, U.S.
- Died: August 5, 1943 (aged 58); Los Angeles, California, U.S.
- Occupation: Actor
- Years active: 1920–1939

William H. Strauss (June 13, 1885 – August 5, 1943) was an American film actor active in the 1920s and 1930s. A character actor he appeared in a variety of supporting roles.

By 1928, Strauss had acted on stage and screen for more than 30 years.

== Selected filmography ==
- The Barricade (1921)
- The Magic Cup (1921)
- Solomon in Society (1922)
- Other Women's Clothes (1922)
- The Law of the Snow Country (1926)
- The Roaring Road (1926)
- Private Izzy Murphy (1926)
- Millionaires (1926)
- Skinner's Dress Suit (1926)
- The Shamrock and the Rose (1927)
- Ladies at Ease (1927)
- Ragtime (1927)
- The Show Girl (1927)
- Ankles Preferred (1927)
- Sally in Our Alley (1927)
- For Ladies Only (1927)
- So This Is Love? (1928)
- The Rawhide Kid (1928)
- Smiling Irish Eyes (1929)
- Lucky Boy (1929)
- The Jazz Cinderella (1930)
- The Public Enemy (1931)
- Five Star Final (1931)
- Love in High Gear (1932)
- The Silk Express (1933)
- Hard to Handle (1933)
- Picture Snatcher (1933)
- Grand Slam (1933)
- Maizie (1933)
- The Mayor of Hell (1933)
- The House of Rothschild (1934)
- Beloved (1934)
- Broadway Bill (1934)
- One More Spring (1935)
- The Little Red Schoolhouse (1936)
- The Texas Rangers (1936)
- The Reckless Way (1936)
- Golden Boy (1939)

== Bibliography ==
- Langman, Larry. American Film Cycles: The Silent Era. Greenwood Publishing, 1998.
- Munden, Kenneth White. The American Film Institute Catalog of Motion Pictures Produced in the United States, Part 1. University of California Press, 1997.
