= Double Alibi (1940 film) =

1940 film directed by Phil Rosen

- Theatrical release poster
- Directed by: Phil Rosen
- Screenplay by: Harold Buchman; Roy Chanslor; Charles Grayson
- Story by: Frederick C. Davis
- Produced by: Ben Pivar
- Starring: Wayne Morris; Margaret Lindsay; William Gargan; Roscoe Karns; Robert Emmett Keane; James Burke
- Cinematography: Elwood Bredell
- Edited by: Ted J. Kent
- Production company: Universal Pictures
- Distributed by: Universal Pictures
- Release date: March 1, 1940
- Running time: 60 minutes
- Country: United States
- Language: English
- Budget: $84,000

Double Alibi is a 1940 American crime film directed by Phil Rosen and written by Harold Buchman, Roy Chanslor and Charles Grayson. The film stars Wayne Morris, Margaret Lindsay, William Gargan, Roscoe Karns, Robert Emmett Keane and James Burke. The film was released on March 1, 1940, by Universal Pictures.

== Plot ==
A man's ex-wife is murdered and he is the prime suspect.

== Cast ==
- Wayne Morris as Stephen Wayne
- Margaret Lindsay as Sue Casey
- William Gargan as Walter Gifford
- Roscoe Karns as Jeremiah Jenkins
- Robert Emmett Keane as Chick Lester
- James Burke as Police Captain Orr
- William Pawley as Dan Kraley
- Frank Mitchell as Lennie Noland
- Eddy Chandler as Patrolman Harrigan
- Cliff Clark as Police Inspector Early
- Robert Emmett O'Connor as Patrolman Delaney
- Wade Boteler as Bartender
- Mary Treen as Hospital Switchboard Operator
