= The Mighty Treve =

Film directed by Lewis D. Collins

- Theatrical release poster
- Directed by: Lewis D. Collins
- Screenplay by: Albert R. Perkins; Marcus Goodrich; Charles Grayson
- Based on: Treve by Albert Payson Terhune
- Produced by: Val Paul
- Starring: Noah Beery Jr. Barbara Read; Samuel S. Hinds; Hobart Cavanaugh; Alma Kruger; Earle Foxe
- Cinematography: Jerome Ash
- Edited by: Philip Cahn
- Production company: Universal Pictures
- Distributed by: Universal Pictures
- Release date: January 17, 1937
- Running time: 67 minutes
- Country: United States
- Language: English

The Mighty Treve is a 1937 American drama film directed by Lewis D. Collins and written by Albert R. Perkins, Marcus Goodrich and Charles Grayson. It is based on the 1925 novel Treve by Albert Payson Terhune. The film stars Noah Beery Jr., Barbara Read, Samuel S. Hinds, Hobart Cavanaugh, Alma Kruger and Earle Foxe. The film was released on January 17, 1937, by Universal Pictures.

== Plot ==
Sheepdog Treve and his owner are given a job in a sheep-ranch owned by an eccentric with a huge fear of dogs, owners of surrounding ranches accuse Treve of being a sheep killer.

== Cast ==
- Noah Beery Jr. as Bud McClelland
- Barbara Read as Aileen Fenno
- Samuel S. Hinds as Uncle Joel Fenno
- Hobart Cavanaugh as Mr. Davis
- Alma Kruger as Mrs. Davis
- Earle Foxe as Judson
- Julian Rivero as Pepe
- Edmund Cobb as Slego
- Spencer Charters as Watling
- Frank Reicher as Eben McClelland
- Erville Alderson as Chris Hibbens
- Guy Usher as Edward L. Wilton
- Tuffy as Treve
- Chester Gan as Chang
- Robert McKenzie as Sheriff
- Monte Vandergrift as Policeman
- Harold Erickson as Deputy Lafe
- William Gould as First Dog Show Judge
- Guy Edward Hearn as Second Dog Show Judge
- Ralph Gilliam as Rancher's Boy
- Robert Dudley as Rancher at Auction
- Heinie Conklin as Rancher at Auction
- Al Williams as Program Seller
- Georgie Billings as Rancher's Son
- Nora Cecil as Old Maid at Dog Show
