= Afton Township, Cherokee County, Iowa =

Township in Iowa, US

Afton Township
- Township
- Coordinates: 42°46′31″N 095°26′41″W
- Country: United States
- State: Iowa
- County: Cherokee

Area
  - Total: 36.08 sq mi (93.44 km^{2})
  - Land: 36.07 sq mi (93.43 km^{2})
  - Water: 0.0039 sq mi (0.01 km^{2})
- Elevation: 1,365 ft (416 m)

Population (2000)
  - Total: 287
  - Density: 8.0/sq mi (3.1/km^{2})
- FIPS code: 19-90021
- GNIS feature ID: 0467378

Afton Township is one of the sixteen townships located in Cherokee County, Iowa, United States. At the 2000 census, its population was 287.

== Geography ==
Afton Township covers an area of 36.08 square miles (93.4 km^{2}) and contains no incorporated settlements. According to the USGS, it contains two cemeteries: Afton and Immanuel Lutheran.

== Notable people ==
Pierre Watkin, later a veteran character actor in Hollywood, was born here in 1887.
