= Muriel Window =

American singer (1892–1965)

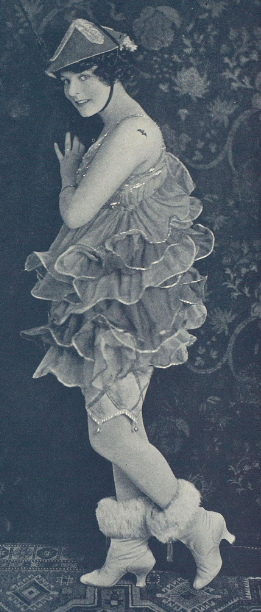
- Muriel Window, from a 1916 publication
- Born: Muriel Inetta Window; February 16, 1892; Burlingame, Kansas, U.S.
- Died: August 29, 1965 (aged 73); Fort Lauderdale, Florida, U.S.
- Other names: Muriel Keane; Muriel Hanford; Muriel Turnley
- Occupations: Singer, vaudeville performer, businesswoman
- Spouses: Robert Emmett Keane (m. 1916; div. 1920) Arthur S. Hanford Jr (m. 1920; div. 1932) Howard Chandler Turnley (m. 1934; died 1946)

Muriel Inetta Window Turnley (February 16, 1892 – August 29, 1965) was an American actress, singer, vaudeville performer, Ziegfeld Girl, and businesswoman.

== Early life ==
Window was born in Burlingame, Kansas. Her mother was Catherine Innetta "Kate" Hoover Comrada (1870–1961) and her father was Thomas P. Window. She was raised in Seattle, where she studied music.

== Career ==
Window was a Ziegfeld Girl, known as the "Peacock Girl" or the "Little Peacock" for her showy costumes. On Broadway she appeared in The Passing Show of 1914. She also headlined on the vaudeville stage.

During World War I Window performed in London and Paris, drove an ambulance, and sang at military hospitals and on a Canadian troop ship. She was honored by the Canadian government for her wartime service. Between the wars she toured in Australia with Harry Lauder, and returned to Broadway. She also earned a pilot's license. "I believe I was the first woman in Iowa to fly her own plane," she told an interviewer in 1931. She claimed to have introduced Marion Davies to William Randolph Hearst. During World War II Window volunteered to return to uniform in the war effort.

Window owned the Peacock Lounge in Arnolds Park, Iowa. Jimmy Dorsey appeared there with his band, and wrote a song named "Muriel" for the proprietor. In Florida after 1954, she owned and entertained at another establishment, Muriel's Exotic Jade House, a seasonal tropical-themed restaurant north of Lauderdale-by-the-Sea. She was known to host visits from old vaudeville colleagues at the Jade House.

== Personal life ==
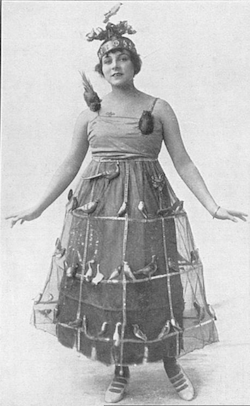
Muriel Window, from a 1916 publication. This costume reportedly featured 39 stuffed birds.

Window was married three times. Her first husband was fellow performer Robert Emmett Keane; they married in about 1916 and divorced in about 1920. Her second husband was wealthy Arthur S. Hanford Jr. They married in May 1920. They separated in 1928, but his murder trial in 1930 put off divorce proceedings until 1932. Her third husband was businessman Howard Chandler Turnley; they married in Mexico in 1934 and in Nebraska in 1935. She was stepmother to Howard's children, Howard Jr. and Alice, who lived with the Turnleys in Iowa. Howard Turnley died in 1946.

Window lived in Florida in widowhood, until she died there in 1965, aged 73 years, from complications following an appendectomy. A few years later, a toy piano given by Marion Davies to Window turned up in an antiques store, and a newspaper reporter wrote about it and its late owner.
