= Sensation Hunters (1933 film) =

1933 film by Charles Vidor

- Directed by: Charles Vidor
- Written by: Whitman Chambers (story "Cabaret"); Albert DeMond (dialogue); Paul Schofield (adaptation)
- Produced by: Trem Carr (producer); Robert E. Welsh (supervising producer)
- Starring: Arline Judge; Preston Foster; Marion Burns
- Cinematography: Sidney Hickox
- Edited by: Carl Pierson
- Distributed by: Monogram Pictures
- Release date: August 30, 1933
- Running time: 73 minutes
- Country: United States
- Language: English

Sensation Hunters is a 1933 American pre-Code B movie directed by Charles Vidor, starring Arline Judge, Preston Foster and Marion Burns, and released by Monogram Pictures. The film briefly features Walter Brennan as a stuttering waiter.

== Cast ==
- Arline Judge as Jerry Royal
- Preston Foster as Tom Baylor
- Marion Burns as Dale Jordan
- Kenneth MacKenna as Jimmy Crosby
- Juanita Hansen as Trixie Snell
- Creighton Hale as Fred Barrett
- Cyril Chadwick as Upson
- Nella Walker as Mrs. Grayson
- Walter Brennan as Stuttering Waiter

== Soundtrack ==
- Arline Judge and chorus - "If It Ain't One Man" (Written by Bernie Grossman and Harold Lewis)
- Marion Burns - "There's Something In the Air" (Written by Bernie Grossman and Harold Lewis)
