= Devil Tiger =

1934 film directed by Clyde E. Elliott

- Directed by: Clyde E. Elliott
- Screenplay by: James O. Spearing; Russell G. Shields; Lew Lehr
- Story by: James O. Spearing
- Starring: Marion Burns; Kane Richmond; Harry Woods; Ah Lee
- Cinematography: John Brockhurst; Richard W. Maedler
- Edited by: Truman H. Talley
- Production company: Fox Film Corporation
- Distributed by: Fox Film Corporation
- Release date: February 8, 1934
- Running time: 60 minutes
- Country: United States
- Language: English

Devil Tiger is a 1934 American action film directed by Clyde E. Elliott and written by James O. Spearing, Russell G. Shields and Lew Lehr. The film stars Marion Burns, Kane Richmond, Harry Woods and Ah Lee. The film was released on February 8, 1934, by Fox Film Corporation.

== Cast ==
- Marion Burns as Mary Brewster
- Kane Richmond as Robert 'Bob' Eller
- Harry Woods as Ramseye Doyle
- Ah Lee as Ah Lee
- Remow the Tiger as Satan
