= Coroner Creek =

1948 film by Ray Enright

- Theatrical release poster
- Directed by: Ray Enright
- Screenplay by: Kenneth Gamet
- Based on: the novel Coroner Creek; 1946 novel by Luke Short
- Produced by: Harry Joe Brown
- Starring: Randolph Scott; Marguerite Chapman
- Cinematography: Fred Jackman Jr.
- Edited by: Harvey Manger
- Music by: Rudy Schrager
- Color process: Cinecolor
- Production company: Producer-Actors Corporation
- Distributed by: Columbia Pictures
- Release date: July 1, 1948
- Running time: 90 minutes
- Country: United States
- Language: English

Coroner Creek is a 1948 American Western film directed by Ray Enright and starring Randolph Scott and Marguerite Chapman. It was based on the novel of the same name by Luke Short.

== Plot ==
After his fiancée is abducted from a stagecoach and ends up dead, Chris Danning rides into the town of Coroner Creek seeking the man responsible.

Hotel owner Kate Hardison asks him to escort home Abbie, the inebriated wife of rich rancher Younger Miles, but his motives are mistaken and Chris is beaten by Younger's men. A widow, Della, tells him that Younger is trying to drive her off her land, and Chris begins to believe Younger could be the man he's after.

Sheriff O'Hea witnesses Younger strike his daughter, causing him to re-evaluate his position as sheriff, deciding to no longer be one of Younger's pawns, whilst Abbie leaves Younger.

Younger and his men kill Andy West, one of Della's hired hands who Chris has become friends with, as well as the sheriff after the sheriff takes Younger's two gunmen into jail to be given a fair trial, Younger also has his men set a fire that leads to Della losing all her cattle.

A showdown ensues in the town hall in which Chris throws a dagger used in the raid which killed his fiancée at Younger and tells him to take it, Younger attempts to flee up a ladder but one of the rungs break just as Chris is about to shoot, sending Younger plummeting to the floor below, killing himself when the dagger is thrust into his chest from the impact. Chris leaves the hall and to a possible romance with Kate.

== Cast ==
- Randolph Scott as Chris Danning
- Marguerite Chapman as Kate Hardison
- George Macready as Younger Miles
- Sally Eilers as Della Harms
- Edgar Buchanan as Sheriff O'Hea
- Barbara Reed as Abbie Miles
- Wallace Ford as Andy West
- Forrest Tucker as Ernie Combs
- Joe Sawyer as Frank Yordy
- William Bishop as Leach Conover
- Russell Simpson as Walt Hardison
- Douglas Fowley as Stew Shallis
- Lee Bennett as Tip Henry
