= Robert Emmett Keane =

American actor (1883–1981)

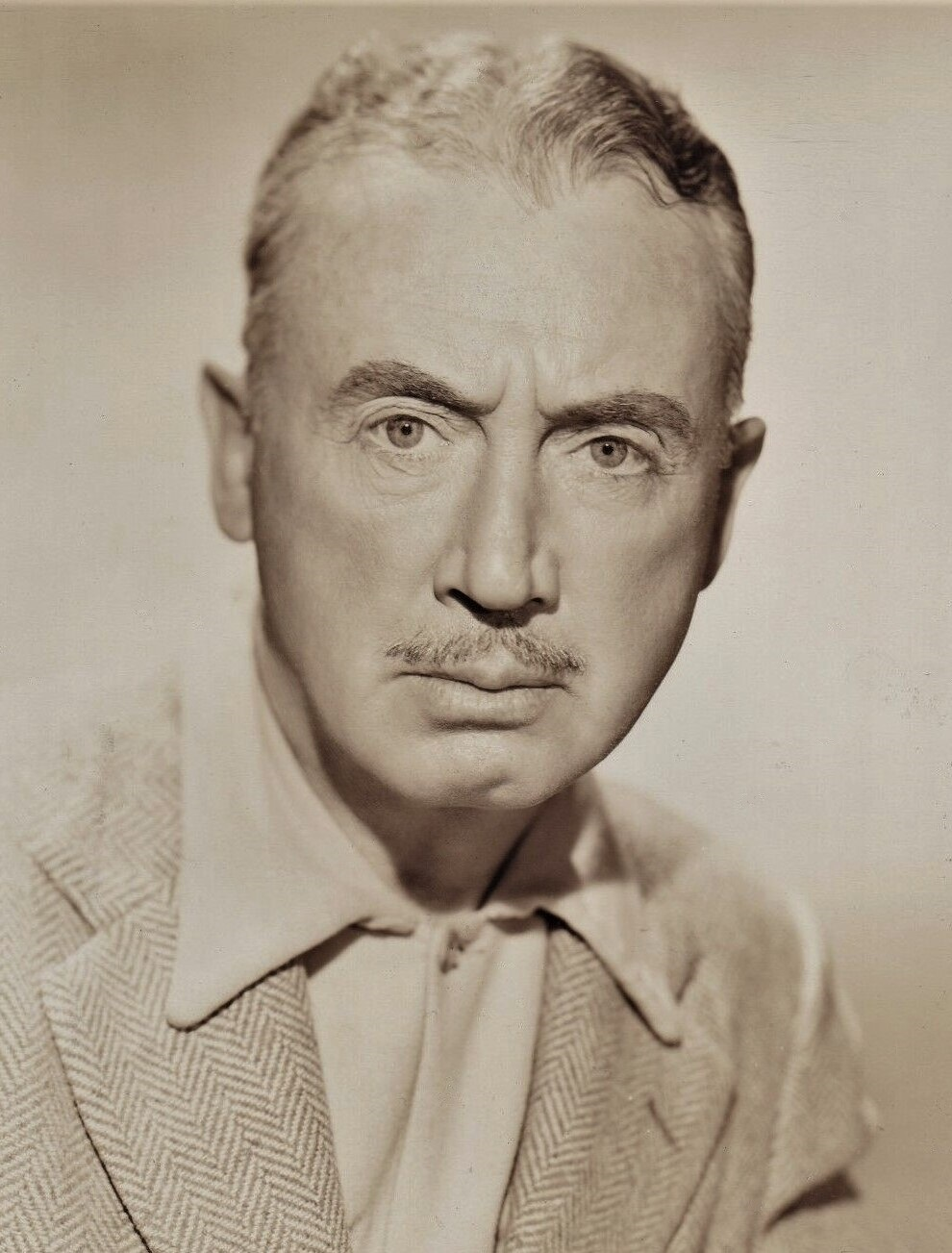
- Publicity still of Keane for Fear in the Night (1947)
- Born: March 4, 1883; New York City, U.S.
- Died: July 2, 1981 (aged 98); Hollywood, California, U.S.
- Occupation: Actor
- Years active: 1914–1958
- Spouse(s): Muriel Inetta Window Turnley (m. 1916–div. 1920); Claire Whitney (m. 1921–1969, her death)

Robert Emmett Keane (March 4, 1883 – July 2, 1981) was an American actor of both the stage and screen.

== Biography ==
Keane began on stage in the 1910s, his first Broadway appearance being in the production of The Passing Show of 1914. He continued on the stage through the mid-1930s, appearing in both London and New York theater productions. His film career began in 1930, and over the twenty-five years of that career he appeared in between 170 and 200 films. At the very tail end of his acting life he made several appearances on the small screen.

Keane was married twice. His first marriage was to Muriel Inetta Window, an opera singer, vaudeville actress and 1913 Peacock Girl with the Ziegfeld Follies. They were married in approximately 1916 and divorced in 1920. After his divorce, he married the actress Claire Whitney in 1921, and they remained married until her death in 1969. He retired in 1958, and died on July 2, 1981. He was buried in Forest Lawn Memorial Park in Los Angeles, next to his wife, Claire (although her grave is unmarked).

== Filmography ==
(Per AFI database)

- Captain Thunder (1930) as Don Miguel
- Laugh and Get Rich (1931) as Phelps
- Men Call It Love (1931) as Joe
- Enlighten Thy Daughter (1934) as Dr. Palmer
- Mad Love (1935) as Raoul - the Drunk (uncredited)
- Brides Are Like That (1936) as Jones, the Jeweler
- The Captain's Kid (1936) as Mister Bridges
- The Big Noise (1936) as Mr. Aldrich
- Grand Jury (1936) as Walters (uncredited)
- Freshman Love (1936) as Announcer (uncredited)
- Beware of Ladies (1936) as Charles Collins
- Hot Money (1936) as Professor Kimberly
- Jailbreak (1936) as City Editor
- Down the Stretch (1936) as Nick
- Panic on the Air (1936) as Cillani
- Forgotten Faces (1936) as Fields
- Man of the People (1937)
- Saratoga (1937)
- Jim Hanvey, Detective (1937)
- 45 Fathers (1937)
- A Family Affair (1937)
- Under Suspicion (1937)
- Hot Water (1937)
- Live, Love and Learn (1937)
- The Devil Is Driving (1937)
- I Promise to Pay (1937)
- Boys Town (1938)
- Too Hot to Handle (1938)
- Billy the Kid Returns (1938)
- Arsène Lupin Returns (1938)
- Born to Be Wild (1938)
- The Last Express (1938)
- Meet the Girls (1938)
- The Chaser (1938)
- Strange Faces (1938)
- Confessions of a Nazi Spy (1939)
- The Adventures of Huckleberry Finn (1939)
- The Rookie Cop (1939)
- The Sun Never Sets (1939)
- 5th Avenue Girl (1939)
- Streets of New York (1939)
- Swanee River (1939)
- Pack Up Your Troubles (1939)
- Henry Goes Arizona (1939)
- Outside These Walls (1939)
- Mr. Smith Goes to Washington (1939) - Editor (uncredited)
- News Is Made at Night (1939)
- Pardon Our Nerve (1939)
- Cafe Society (1939)
- 6,000 Enemies (1939)
- Hawaiian Nights (1939)
- The Spellbinder (1939)
- One Hour to Live (1939)
- Little Nellie Kelly (1940)
- The Border Legion (1940)
- Lillian Russell (1940)
- Millionaires in Prison (1940)
- Tin Pan Alley (1940)
- The Lone Wolf Meets a Lady (1940)
- The Saint Takes Over (1940)
- City of Chance (1940)
- Double Alibi (1940)
- I Can't Give You Anything but Love, Baby (1940)
- Slightly Tempted (1940)
- The Man Who Wouldn't Talk (1940)
- Michael Shayne, Private Detective (1940)
- All That Money Can Buy (1941)
- Blonde Inspiration (1941)
- The Cowboy and the Blonde (1941)
- The Devil and Miss Jones (1941)
- Dr. Kildare's Wedding Day (1941)
- Hello, Sucker (1941)
- High Sierra (1941)
- In the Navy (1941)
- Men of Boys Town (1941)
- Pacific Blackout (1941)
- Three Girls About Town (1941)
- Mr. and Mrs. Smith (1941)
- Wild Geese Calling (1941)
- Michael Shayne, Private Detective (1941)
- A-Haunting We Will Go (1942)
- Daring Young Man (1942)
- A Gentleman at Heart (1942)
- Give Out, Sisters (1942)
- It Happened in Flatbush (1942)
- Lady in a Jam (1942)
- The Lady is Willing (1942)
- The Man Who Wouldn't Die (1942)
- My Favorite Blonde (1942)
- The Night Before the Divorce (1942)
- Orchestra Wives (1942)
- Private Buckaroo (1942)
- Remember Pearl Harbor (1942)
- Sabotage Squad (1942)
- This Time for Keeps (1942)
- The War Against Mrs. Hadley (1942)
- Young America (1942)
- Crazy House (1943)
- The Dancing Masters (1943)
- The Falcon in Danger (1943) - Wally Fairchild (uncredited)
- Fired Wife (1943)
- The Good Fellows (1943)
- He Hired the Boss (1943)
- Henry Aldrich Gets Glamour (1943)
- Jitterbugs (1943)
- The Meanest Man in the World (1943)
- Salute for Three (1943)
- Kansas City Kitty (1944)
- It Happened Tomorrow (1944)
- The Impatient Years (1944)
- Hi, Good Lookin'! (1944)
- Casanova Brown (1944)
- The Merry Monahans (1944)
- Slightly Terrific (1944)
- Strange Affair (1944)
- Sweet and Low-Down (1944)
- Uncertain Glory (1944)
- The Whistler (1944)
- Her Lucky Night (1945)
- Over 21 (1945)
- Patrick the Great (1945)
- Scared Stiff (1945)
- Why Girls Leave Home (1945)
- You Came Along (1945)
- The Red Dragon (1946)
- Gentleman Joe Palooka (1946)
- The Hoodlum Saint (1946)
- Live Wires (1946)
- Night Editor (1946)
- Rainbow Over Texas (1946)
- The Shadow Returns (1946)
- The Strange Mr. Gregory (1946)
- Fool's Gold (1947)
- My Brother Talks to Horses (1947)
- The Beginning or the End (1947)
- Fear in the Night (1947)
- The Foxes of Harrow (1947)
- Her Husband's Affairs (1947)
- I Wonder Who's Kissing Her Now? (1947)
- The Millerson Case (1947)
- Millie's Daughter (1947)
- News Hounds (1947)
- Sport of Kings (1947)
- Undercover Maisie (1947)
- Angels' Alley (1948)
- Big City (1948)
- The Bride Goes Wild (1948)
- A Double Life (1948)
- The Gentleman from Nowhere (1948)
- I Surrender Dear (1948)
- Out of the Storm (1948)
- The Timber Trail (1948)
- When My Baby Smiles at Me (1948)
- Incident (1949)
- The Crime Doctor's Diary (1949)
- Everybody Does It (1949)
- Follow Me Quietly (1949)
- Frontier Investigator (1949)
- Henry, the Rainmaker (1949)
- Navajo Trail Raiders (1949)
- Susanna Pass (1949)
- The Sickle or the Cross (1949)
- Jolson Sings Again (1950)
- Mary Ryan, Detective (1950)
- There's a Girl in My Heart (1950)
- Blondie's Hero (1950)
- Father Makes Good (1950)
- The Good Humor Man (1950)
- Hills of Oklahoma (1950)
- A Life of Her Own (1950)
- Please Believe Me (1950)
- The Toast of New Orleans (1950)
- The Atomic Kid (1954)
- When Gangland Strikes (1956)
