= The Spellbinder =

- Theatrical release poster
- Directed by: Jack Hively
- Screenplay by: Thomas Lennon; Joseph Fields
- Story by: Joseph Anthony
- Produced by: Cliff Reid
- Starring: Lee Tracy; Barbara Read; Patric Knowles; Allan Lane; Linda Hayes
- Cinematography: Russell Metty
- Edited by: Theron Warth
- Music by: Rex Dunn
- Production company: RKO Pictures
- Distributed by: RKO Pictures
- Release date: July 28, 1939
- Running time: 69 minutes
- Country: United States
- Language: English

The Spellbinder is a 1939 American drama film directed by Jack Hively, written by Thomas Lennon and Joseph Fields, and starring Lee Tracy, Barbara Read, Patric Knowles, Allan Lane and Linda Hayes. It was released on July 28, 1939, by RKO Pictures.

== Plot ==
Jed Marlowe is a lawyer that specialises in defending guilty criminals using loopholes and briberies. His daughter believes that the criminals saved by her father are actually innocent and marries a killer that should have gone to the electric chair if not for Jed.

== Cast ==
- Lee Tracy as Jed Marlowe
- Barbara Read as Janet Marlowe
- Patric Knowles as Tom Dixon
- Allan Lane as Steve Kendall
- Linda Hayes as Miss Simpson
- Morgan Conway as Mr. Carrington
- Robert Emmett Keane as Judge Butler
- Roy Gordon as Third Trial Judge
- Robert Strange as First Trial Judge
- Elliott Sullivan as Harry 'Ice Box' Swinnerty
- Leonid Kinskey as Harry Beldon
- Emory Parnell as Club 88 Doorman
