= The Reckless Way =

1936 film

- Directed by: Raymond K. Johnson
- Written by: Charles E. Roberts; Raymond K. Johnson
- Produced by: C.C. Burr
- Starring: Marian Nixon; Kane Richmond; Inez Courtney
- Cinematography: James Diamond
- Edited by: Charles Henkel Jr.
- Music by: Gene Johnston
- Production company: C.C. Burr Productions
- Distributed by: Puritan Pictures
- Release date: February 2, 1936
- Running time: 68 minutes
- Country: United States
- Language: English

The Reckless Way is a 1936 American comedy film directed by Raymond K. Johnson starring Marian Nixon, Kane Richmond and Inez Courtney. The film's sets were designed by the art director Vin Taylor.

== Plot ==
The story was about a woman working as a stenographer in a hotel and managed to get another job as a model for lingerie. This experience sparked her ambitions to become a celebrity.

== Cast ==
- Marian Nixon as Helen Rogers
- Kane Richmond as Jim Morgan
- Inez Courtney as Laura Jones
- Malcolm McGregor as Don Reynolds
- Harry Harvey as Joe Black
- Art Howard as Mr. Stoner
- Gloria Gordon as Mrs. Stoner
- William H. Strauss as Carl Blatz
- John S. Peters as Von Berg

== Bibliography ==
- Pitts, Michael R. Poverty Row Studios, 1929-1940. McFarland & Company, 2005.
