= Great Guns =

1941 film by Monty Banks

- Directed by: Monty Banks
- Written by: Lou Breslow
- Produced by: Sol M. Wurtzel
- Starring: Stan Laurel; Oliver Hardy; Sheila Ryan; Dick Nelson; Edmund MacDonald
- Cinematography: Glen MacWilliams
- Edited by: Alfred DeGaetano
- Music by: David Buttolph
- Production company: 20th Century Fox
- Distributed by: 20th Century Fox
- Release date: October 10, 1941
- Running time: 74 minutes
- Country: United States
- Language: English

Great Guns is a 1941 American comedy film starring Laurel and Hardy. It was directed by Monty Banks, and produced by Sol M. Wurtzel for 20th Century-Fox.

== Plot ==
Daniel Forrester IV is a wealthy but sheltered and bedridden young bachelor. He receives his draft notice with elation, eager to dispel his aunts' doubts about his constitution. Joining the army alongside his chauffeur Ollie and gardener Stan, they undergo basic training at Fort Merritt in Texas. While Daniel excels, Stan and Ollie's antics irk their drill sergeant, especially Stan's pet crow Penelope.

Sergeant Hippo's jealousy grows as Daniel attracts the attention of Ginger Hammond, the fort's photo developer. Concerned for Daniel's health, Stan and Ollie attempt to dissuade Ginger from pursuing him, fabricating stories about his financial status. However, their efforts fail, and Hippo further intervenes by restricting Daniel's leave.

When Stan and Ollie are captured during a military exercise, Daniel rescues them by having the troops follow Penelope. Their success earns them praise, and Daniel and Ginger's romance blossoms. Victorious, Stan, Ollie, and Daniel take part in a military parade, with Penelope now wearing a uniform.

== Cast ==
- Stan Laurel as Stan
- Oliver Hardy as Oliver
- Sheila Ryan as Ginger Hammond
- Dick Nelson as Daniel Forrester
- Edmund MacDonald as Sgt. Hippo
- Charles Trowbridge as Colonel Ridley
- Ludwig Stossel as Dr. Schickel
- Kane Richmond as Captain Baker
- Mae Marsh as Aunt Martha
- Ethel Griffies as Aunt Agatha
- Paul Harvey as General Taylor
- Charles Arnt as Doctor
- Pierre Watkin as Colonel Wayburn
- Russell Hicks as General Burns
- Irving Bacon as Postman
- James Flavin as White Army Officer

== Production notes ==
Great Guns marked Laurel and Hardy's return to the screen following their departure from Hal Roach Studios. Now working for 20th Century-Fox, the team encountered challenges with unsuitable scripts and limited creative autonomy, contrasting sharply with the freedom they enjoyed at their former studio. The team's biographer John McCabe wrote: "On the set [of Great Guns] they were given their marching orders. It was: do it the studio way or not at all. Any attempt to do things the old way, the Laurel and Hardy way, was not only resisted but put down." More specifically, Stan Laurel had been accustomed to contributing creatively both on- and off-screen at Roach, but at Fox he was employed only as an actor, and was not allowed to contribute to the writing, directing, or editing.

Despite the limited artistic success, Great Guns was an unqualified boxoffice success, earning $1,089,000 during its theatrical run. The film had cost $280,000 to produce. Producer Sol M. Wurtzel had enough confidence in Great Guns to sign Laurel and Hardy for additional features before the first one was released, and the handsome financial returns justified Wurtzel's judgment.

Alan Ladd appears briefly as a photo-store customer.
