= Paradise Canyon =

1935 film

- Original theatrical poster
- Directed by: Carl L. Pierson
- Written by: Lindsley Parsons; Robert Emmett
- Produced by: Paul Malvern
- Starring: John Wayne; Yakima Canutt
- Cinematography: Archie Stout
- Edited by: Jerry Roberts
- Music by: Billy Barber (colorized version)
- Distributed by: Monogram Pictures Corporation
- Release date: July 20, 1935
- Running time: 52 minutes
- Language: English

Paradise Canyon is a 1935 Western film starring John Wayne, directed by Carl L. Pierson. The film was Wayne's final Monogram Pictures/Lone Star Production Western. The film was released years later in a colorized version on home video/dvd under the title Guns Along the Trail.

== Plot ==
John Wyatt is a government agent sent to smash a counterfeiting operation near the Mexican border. Joining Doc Carter's medicine show, they arrive in the town where Curly Joe, who once framed Carter, resides. Learning that Curly Joe is the counterfeiter, Wyatt goes after the man himself.

== Cast ==
- John Wayne as John Wyatt
- Marion Burns as Linda Carter aka Princess Natasha
- Reed Howes as Henchman Red
- Earle Hodgins as Doc Carter
- Gino Corrado as Rurales Captain
- Yakima Canutt as Curly Joe Gale
- Gordon Clifford as Mike – singer, Texas Two
- Perry Murdock as Ike – singer, Texas Two
- Earl Dwire (uncredited) as the second Sheriff

== Colorization ==
In 2008, Legend Films colorized and renamed the film as Guns Along The Trail, for a DVD collection that features several other "Poverty Row" era John Wayne films.

== See also ==
- John Wayne filmography
