= Oklahoma Jim =

1931 film

- Theatrical release poster
- Directed by: Harry L. Fraser
- Screenplay by: George Arthur Durlam; Harry L. Fraser
- Produced by: Trem Carr
- Starring: Bill Cody; Andy Shuford; Marion Burns; William Desmond; Franklyn Farnum; John Elliott
- Cinematography: Archie Stout
- Edited by: Leonard Wheeler
- Production company: Monogram Pictures
- Distributed by: Monogram Pictures
- Release date: October 10, 1931
- Running time: 53 minutes
- Country: United States
- Language: English

Oklahoma Jim is a 1931 American Western film directed by Harry L. Fraser and written by George Arthur Durlam and Harry L. Fraser. The film stars Bill Cody, Andy Shuford, Marion Burns, William Desmond, Franklyn Farnum and John Elliott. The film was released on October 10, 1931, by Monogram Pictures.

== Cast ==
- Bill Cody as Oklahoma Jim Kirby
- Andy Shuford as Jerry
- Marion Burns as Betty Rankin
- William Desmond as Lacy
- Franklyn Farnum as Army Captain
- John Elliott as Indian Agent
- Ed Brady as Cash Riley
- Earl Dwire as Cavalry Sergeant

== Censorship ==
Before Oklahoma Jim could be exhibited in Kansas, the Kansas Board of Review required the elimination of all scenes where people are nude, the reason given was that they were "indecent."
