= Rip Roaring Riley =

1935 film

- Directed by: Elmer Clifton
- Written by: Homer King Gordon; George Jeske
- Produced by: C.C. Burr
- Starring: Lloyd Hughes; Marion Burns; Grant Withers
- Cinematography: Irvin Akers
- Edited by: Tony Martinelli
- Production company: C.C. Burr Productions
- Distributed by: Puritan Pictures
- Release date: October 24, 1935
- Running time: 55 minutes
- Country: United States
- Language: English

Rip Roaring Riley is a 1935 American action film directed by Elmer Clifton and starring Elmer Clifton, with Lloyd Hughes, Marion Burns and Grant Withers. The film's sets were designed by the art director Vin Taylor. A second feature, it was released in America by Puritan Pictures and in Britain by Pathé Pictures under the alternative title The Mystery of Diamond Island.

== Plot ==
A federal agent manages to crash land on Diamond Island, where the government suspects that Major Gray is developing a new poison gas, by forcing Professor Baker and his daughter Anne to work for him.

== Cast ==
- Lloyd Hughes as Ted 'Rip-Roaring' Riley
- Marion Burns as Anne Baker
- Grant Withers as Major Gray
- John Cowell as Professor Baker
- Paul Ellis as Franko - Henchman
- Eddie Gribbon as Sparko - Henchman
- Kit Guard as Bruno - Henchman
- Joe Hirakawa as Lun - Houseboy
- Wilfred Lucas as Police Chief

== Bibliography ==
- Langman, Larry. Return to Paradise: A Guide to South Sea Island Films. Scarecrow Press, 1998.
- Pitts, Michael R. Poverty Row Studios, 1929–1940. McFarland & Company, 2005.
