= Marion Burns =

American actress (1907–1993)

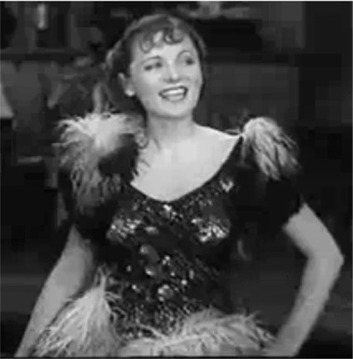
- Marion Burns
- Born: August 9, 1907; Los Angeles, California, U.S.
- Died: December 22, 1993 (aged 86); Laguna Niguel, California, U.S.
- Occupation: Actress
- Years active: 1931 – 1961
- Spouses: Bruce MacFarlane (m. 1932; div. 1933) Kane Richmond (m. 1934; died 1973)
- Children: 2

Marion Burns (August 9, 1907 – December 22, 1993) was an American film actress of the 1930s. She is best known for starring opposite John Wayne in The Dawn Rider and Paradise Canyon, both in 1935. She earlier had a large supporting role in the 1932 film Me and My Gal, starring Spencer Tracy and Joan Bennett.

== Biography ==
=== Early years ===
Burns was born in Los Angeles, California. Her father, L. L. Burns, founded Western Costume Company, which handled about ninety percent of the costuming for films in Los Angeles in the 1920s. She earned a bachelor's degree in dramatics from the University of California. Burns was active in stock theater. Her Broadway credits include Intimate Relations and They Don't Mean Any Harm, both in 1931.

=== Film ===
Burns received her first film role in 1931, starring opposite Bill Cody in Oklahoma Jim. That film started her on the path of starring in Western films as a heroine. In 1932, she starred opposite George O'Brien in The Golden West, followed by Raoul Walsh's modern-day comedy Me and My Gal (1932) with Spencer Tracy and Joan Bennett that same year, which showcased Burns with a lot of screen time. In 1933, she starred in Sensation Hunters opposite Preston Foster; 1934 and 1935 were her biggest years, with her appearing in six films, three each year, two of which were uncredited, and the most notable being the two John Wayne films. Her first film in 1934 was Devil Tiger.

In Devil Tiger, Director Clyde E. Elliott allowed his hero, Kane Richmond, to fight a 25-foot python with no stuntman. Richmond hated doubles and had insisted. The actor, on his feet, on the ground, on his feet again, succeeded in holding the snake's snapping mouth away from his face, while struggling to free himself from the triple coils around his body. At the height of the struggle, the heroine, Marion Burns, runs in and saves the hero from the python. Miss Burns had to fight the snake, too, to get at Richmond's pistol, with which she was supposed to shoot the python. She played her own scene, as well.

In the 1934 film Born to Be Bad, Burns starred alongside Cary Grant and Loretta Young. In her last film of 1935, she starred opposite Lloyd Hughes in the crime drama Rip Roaring Riley. It was her last film for a span of 10 years.

She returned to acting three times and only briefly following 1935. The first time was in a stage appearance in Leaning on Letty in January 1936 at the El Capitan Theatre in Los Angeles. The second time was in 1945 alongside her husband in Brenda Starr, Reporter, which starred Kane Richmond and Joan Woodbury. The third time was in 1961, when she appeared on one episode of the television series My Three Sons.

=== Personal life ===
Burns married twice, both times to actors. She first married, then divorced, Bruce MacFarlane. Her second marriage was in 1934 to Kane Richmond, though reports in January 1934 state that they had been married in secret in May 1933. Burns and Richmond had two daughters.

=== Later years ===
Burns eventually settled in Laguna Niguel, California, where she was living at the time of her death on December 22, 1993.

== Filmography ==
Year	Title	Role	Notes
1931	Oklahoma Jim	Betty Rankin	
1932	The Golden West	Helen Sheppard	
1932	Me and My Gal	Kate Riley	
1933	Sensation Hunters	Dale Jordan	
1934	Devil Tiger	Mary Brewster	
1934	Born to Be Bad	Mrs. Alyce Trevor	
1934	Flirting with Danger	Marian Leslie	
1935	The Dawn Rider	Alice Gordon	
1935	Paradise Canyon	Linda Carter - aka Princess Natasha	
1935	Rip Roaring Riley	Anne Baker	
1938	Dramatic School	Working Girl	Uncredited
1945	Brenda Starr, Reporter	Zelda	Serial, [Ch 9-10,12], Uncredited
