= Born to Be Wild (1938 film) =

1938 film by Joseph Kane

- Theatrical release poster
- Directed by: Joseph Kane
- Screenplay by: Nathanael West
- Produced by: Harold Shumate
- Starring: Ralph Byrd; Doris Weston; Ward Bond; Robert Emmett Keane; Ben Hewlett; Charles Williams
- Cinematography: Jack A. Marta
- Edited by: William Morgan
- Production company: Republic Pictures
- Distributed by: Republic Pictures
- Release date: February 16, 1938
- Running time: 66 minutes
- Country: United States
- Language: English

Born to Be Wild is a 1938 American action film directed by Joseph Kane and written by Nathanael West. The film stars Ralph Byrd, Doris Weston, Ward Bond, Robert Emmett Keane, Ben Hewlett and Charles Williams. The film was released on February 16, 1938, by Republic Pictures.

== Plot ==
Two reckless truck drivers are hired to transport what they are told is a routine shipment of lettuce. Expecting an uneventful haul, they set out without questioning the details of the assignment. Along the way, they encounter striking farm workers who block the road, creating delays and tension that disrupt their schedule.

As the journey progresses, the drivers discover that the cargo is not produce but dynamite. The seemingly ordinary delivery is in fact a far more dangerous mission. They are instructed to transport the explosives to a clogged dam and detonate them in order to clear the obstruction.

The remainder of the story follows their reluctant involvement in this hazardous task, as they face increasing risks, logistical obstacles, and the potentially catastrophic consequences of big failure.

== Cast ==
- Ralph Byrd as Steve Hackett
- Doris Weston as Mary Stevens
- Ward Bond as Bill Purvis
- Robert Emmett Keane as J. Stearns Davis
- Ben Hewlett as Wilson
- Charles Williams as Company Spotter
- Davison Clark as Stranger
- Byron Foulger as Husband
- George Anderson as Mayor
- Edwin Stanley as Randolph
- Ben Hendricks Jr. as Deputy
- Sterlita Peluffo as Manuela
- Lew Kelly as Reilly
- Harrison Greene as J. Carroll Malloy
- George Magrill as Hank
- Anna Demetrio as Cristobella
- Dan White (actor) Striker (uncredited)
