= Death Valley (1946 film) =

1946 film directed by Lew Landers

- Theatrical release poster
- Directed by: Lew Landers
- Screenplay by: Doris Schroeder
- Story by: Doris Schroeder
- Produced by: William David
- Starring: Nat Pendleton; Helen Gilbert; Robert Lowery
- Cinematography: Marcel La Picard
- Edited by: George McGuire
- Music by: James Mayfield
- Production company: Golden Gate Productions
- Distributed by: Screen Guild Productions
- Release date: August 15, 1946
- Running time: 67 minutes
- Country: United States
- Language: English

Death Valley is a 1946 American Naturalcolor Western film directed by Lew Landers and starring Nat Pendleton, Helen Gilbert and Robert Lowery.

== Plot ==
A dance hall girl is murdered and her killer flees to Death Valley.

== Cast ==
- Nat Pendleton as Jim Ward
- Helen Gilbert as Joan Bagley
- Robert Lowery as Steve
- Sterling Holloway as Slim
- Barbara Read as Mitzi (as Barbara Reed)
- Russell Simpson as Old Silas Bagley
- Paul Hurst as Sergeant Dailey
- Dick Scott as Sam Duff - Assayer
- Stanley Price as 2nd Assayer (as Stan Price)
- Robert Benton as Duke (as Bob Benton)
