= Me and My Gal =

1932 film directed by Raoul Walsh

- Directed by: Raoul Walsh
- Written by: Barry Conners (story); Philip Klein (story); Arthur Kober (screenplay)
- Produced by: Raoul Walsh
- Starring: Spencer Tracy; Joan Bennett; Marion Burns
- Cinematography: Arthur C. Miller
- Edited by: Jack Murray
- Production company: Fox Film Corporation
- Release date: December 3, 1932
- Running time: 79 minutes
- Country: United States
- Language: English

Me and My Gal is a 1932 American pre-Code romantic crime comedy-drama film starring Spencer Tracy and Joan Bennett, directed by Raoul Walsh and released by the Fox Film Corporation. The film tells the story of jaunty young policeman Danny Dolan (Tracy), who falls in love with waterfront cafe waitress Helen Riley (Bennett). It is admired as a pre-Code classic today. According to TCM, it did well with critics and audiences, featuring fine performances from its two stars, "displaying the superb chemistry" that can be seen in their other pictures together.

A remake, Pier 13, was released in 1940.

== Plot ==
In this wisecracking comedy, Danny Dolan is a cop whose beat is the New York waterfront. Danny has a soft spot for Helen Riley, a sharp-tongued waitress at a cheap diner, while her scatterbrained sister, Kate, is in love with Duke, a sleazy low-level mobster. While Duke makes a play for Kate, both Helen and Dan know that he is bad news, and Danny wants to put Duke behind bars before he can break Kate's heart.

== Cast ==
- Spencer Tracy as Danny Dolan
- Joan Bennett as Helen Riley
- Marion Burns as Kate Riley
- George Walsh as Duke
- J. Farrell MacDonald as Pop Riley
- Noel Madison as Baby Face
- Henry B. Walthall as Sarge
- Bert Hanlon as Jake
- Adrian Morris as Allen
- George Chandler as Eddie Collins
- Emmett Corrigan as Police Captain
- Jesse De Vorska as Jake
- Lemist Esler as Doctor
- Hank Mann as Hank
- Frank Moran as Drunk's Foil
- Will Stanton as Drunk
- Billy Bevan as Drunk who got hit with fish (uncredited)

== Production ==
=== Development ===
Bennett and Tracy made She Wanted a Millionaire that year, with their billing reversed (Bennett billed over Tracy), and also played a married couple two decades later in Father of the Bride and Father's Little Dividend.

Me and My Gal was directed by Raoul Walsh, a director of the studio system, having directed Regeneration (1915), The Roaring Twenties (1939) and White Heat (1949). He was also the brother of George Walsh, who plays the villain in this film.

Me and My Gal was remade as a B film in 1940 by Fox as Pier 13, directed by Eugene Forde.

== Preservation status ==
A copy is held in the US Library of Congress collection.
