= Kane Richmond =

American actor (1906-1973)

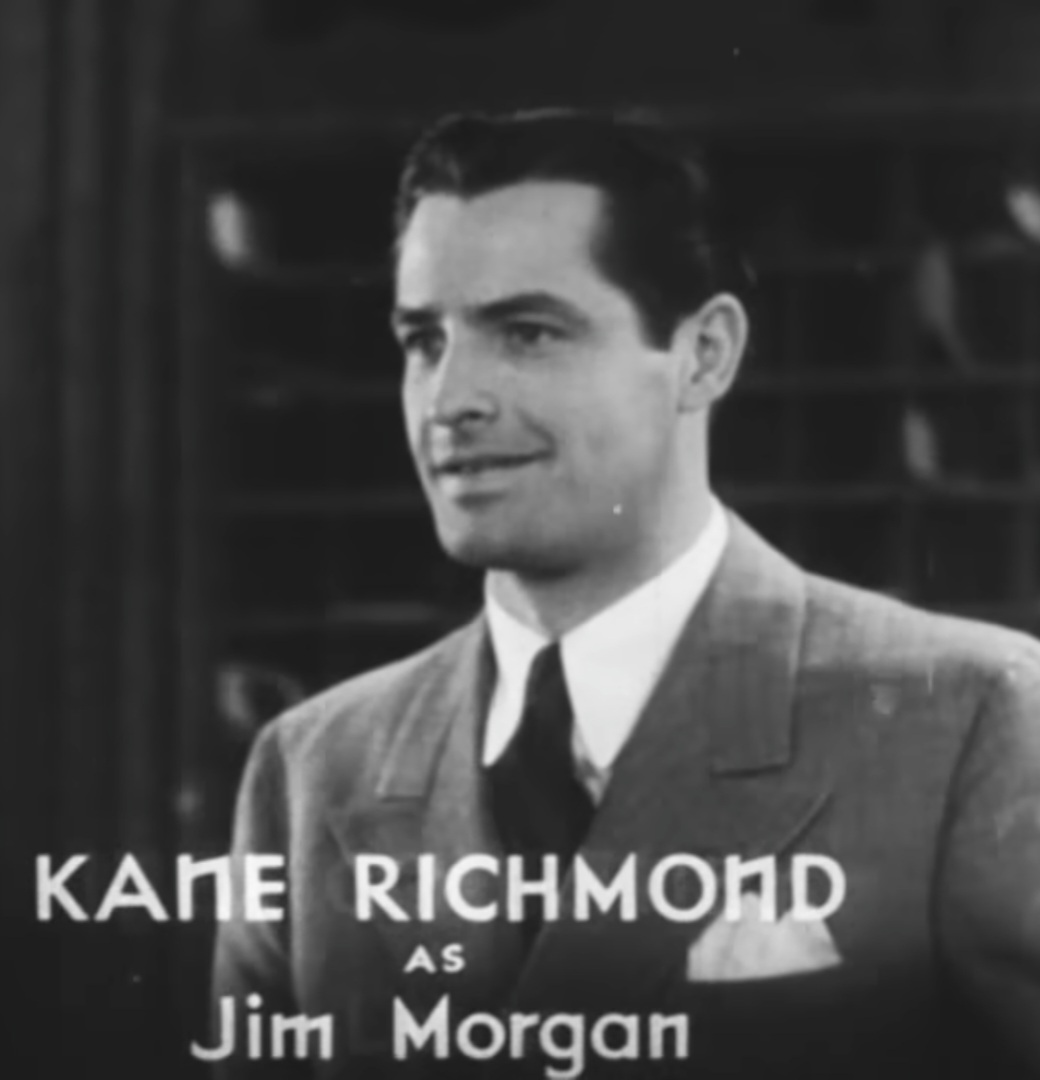
- Richmond in The Reckless Way (1936)
- Born: Frederick William Bowditch; December 23, 1906; Minneapolis, Minnesota, U.S.
- Died: March 22, 1973 (aged 66); Corona Del Mar, California, U.S.
- Resting place: Holy Cross Cemetery, Culver City, California
- Occupation: Actor
- Years active: 1929–1948
- Spouse: Marion Burns (1934–1973) (his death)
- Children: 2

Kane Richmond (born Frederick William Bowditch, December 23, 1906 – March 22, 1973) was an American film actor of the 1930s and 1940s, mostly appearing in cliffhangers and serials. He is best known today for his portrayal of the character Lamont Cranston in The Shadow films in addition to his leading role in the successful serials Spy Smasher and Brick Bradford.

== Early years ==
Richmond was born in Minneapolis, Minnesota, the son of Pearlie Watkins Bowditch and Mary Elizabeth (Waters) Bowditch. He had a sister, Marie, and a brother, Russell. He attended St. Thomas College and the University of Minnesota, playing football at both schools. He moved to Hollywood in the late 1920s to pursue a career in acting.

== Film ==
Before becoming an actor, Richmond (then still known as Fred Bowditch) was a film salesman. In its entry on Richmond, The Film Encyclopedia relates: "[H]e was on a business trip to Hollywood when a Universal executive asked him to test for the lead in The Leather Pushers two-reel action series. He got the part and went on to appear in many other films through the late '40s."

He received his first film roles in 1929, appearing in Song of Love, followed by Their Own Desire, both of which were uncredited. In 1930, he had two more uncredited roles, then landed the lead role in the boxing serial The Leather Pushers, an 11-film series that ran into 1931. Richmond did all of the fight scenes in the serial himself and suffered a broken nose (twice) and a broken ankle as a result. From the remainder of 1931 through 1939, Richmond appeared in 50 films, many of which were cliffhangers, serials, or B-movies.

In The Devil Tiger (1934), director Clyde E. Elliott allowed his star, Richmond, to fight a 25-foot python. Richmond hated doubles and had insisted on playing the scene himself. The actor succeeded in holding the snake's snapping mouth away from his face while struggling to free himself from the triple coils around his body. At the height of the struggle, the heroine, Marion Burns, runs in and saves the hero from the python. Burns had to fight the snake, too, to get at Richmond's pistol, with which she was supposed to shoot the python.

In the serial Spy Smasher for Republic Studios, Richmond played not only the title character, but also his twin brother (a character not present in the comic book).

Richmond appeared in several Charlie Chan films, and in 1940 landed a main supporting role in Knute Rockne All American, which starred Pat O'Brien, Gale Page, and Ronald Reagan. From 1940 through 1946, he appeared in 30 films, including his best-known roles today, three films in The Shadow series, starring opposite Barbara Read. Following these films, his movie career declined considerably, with only three film roles in 1947 and 1948. During the 1950s and 1960s he appeared on several television series until 1966, when he retired.

== Personal life ==
Richmond was married in 1934 to actress Marion Burns. The marriage lasted until his death. They had two children. Richmond was residing in Corona Del Mar, California, at the time of his death at the age of 66. He was buried in Holy Cross Cemetery, Culver City, California.

== Selected filmography ==
- Trial Marriage (1929) – Party Guest (uncredited)
- Song of Love (1929) – Nightclub Patron (uncredited)
- Their Own Desire (1929) – Man at the Resort (uncredited)
- The Ship from Shanghai (1930) – Shanghai Nightclub Patron (uncredited)
- For the Defense (1930) – Young Man at Speakeasy (uncredited)
- Good News (1930) – Student (uncredited)
- The Leather Pushers (1930) – Kane Halliday a.k.a. Kid Roberts
- Strangers May Kiss (1931) – 1st Admirer (uncredited)
- Stepping Out (1931) – Hal Rogers
- Politics (1931) – Nifty Morgan
- Cavalier of the West (1931) – Lieutenant Wilbur Allister
- West of Broadway (1931) – Reggie (uncredited)
- Huddle (1932) – Tom Stone
- Let's Fall in Love (1933) – Ray (uncredited)
- Caravan (1934) – Young Officer at Beer Garden (uncredited)
- Devil Tiger (1934) – Robert 'Bob' Eller
- Coming Out Party (1934) – Party Guest (uncredited)
- Voice in the Night (1934) – Jack
- The Crime of Helen Stanley (1934) – Lee Davis
- Private Scandal (1934) – Buddy – Party Boy (uncredited)
- I Can't Escape (1934) – Bob, college boy at club
- The Age of Innocence (1934) – Dallas Archer (uncredited)
- Death on the Diamond (1934) – Man on Ticket Line (uncredited)
- Forsaking All Others (1934) – Party Guest (uncredited)
- The Lost City (1935, Serial) – Bruce Gordon
- Circus Shadows (1935) – Dale Wentworth
- The Adventures of Rex and Rinty (1935, Serial) – Frank Bradley
- Confidential (1935) – J.W. 'Jack' Keaton, Jr.
- The Silent Code (1935) – NWMP Cpl. Jerry Hale
- Forced Landing (1935) – Jimmy Stafford
- Thunderbolt (1935) – Jack Hall
- The Reckless Way (1936) – Jim Morgan
- The Country Doctor (1936) – Logger Paying Doctor (uncredited)
- Private Number (1936) – Joe
- Born to Fight (1936) – Tom 'Bomber' Brown / Tom Hayes
- Racing Blood (1936) – Clay Harrison
- With Love and Kisses (1936) – Don Gray
- Headline Crasher (1936) – Larry Deering
- Robin Hood, Jr. (1936)
- The Devil Diamond (1937) – Jerry Carter
- Nancy Steele Is Missing! (1937) – Tom – Steele's Chauffeur
- Tough to Handle (1937) – Joe MacIntyre
- Anything for a Thrill (1937) – Cliff Mallory
- Young Dynamite (1937) – Tom Marlin
- Flash Gordon's Trip to Mars (1938, Serial) – Pilot Captain
- Letter of Introduction (1938) – Pedestrian Who Repeats 'Money in the Bank' (uncredited)
- I Am the Law (1938) – Law Student (uncredited)
- Three Loves Has Nancy (1938) – Jack's Friend (uncredited)
- Boys Town (1938) – Jackson – Newspaper Reporter (uncredited)
- The Affairs of Annabel (1938) – Detective (uncredited)
- Juvenile Court (1938) – Bradley (uncredited)
- The Little Adventuress (1938) – Jack Smith (uncredited)
- Tail Spin (1939) – Lt. Dick 'Tex' Price
- Winner Take All (1939) – Paulie Mitchell
- The Return of the Cisco Kid (1939) – Alan Davis
- Charlie Chan in Reno (1939) – Curtis Whitman
- Chicken Wagon Family (1939) – Matt Hibbard
- The Escape (1939) – Eddie Farrell
- 20,000 Men a Year (1939) – Al Williams
- Charlie Chan in Panama (1940) – Richard Cabot
- Sailor's Lady (1940) – Lt. Wood
- Knute Rockne All American (1940) – Elmer Laydon – One of The Four Horsemn
- Murder Over New York (1940) – Ralph Percy
- Play Girl (1941) – Don Shawhan
- Double Cross (1941) – Jim Murray
- Mountain Moonlight (1941) – Paul Conrad
- Riders of the Purple Sage (1941) – Adam Dyer
- Great Guns (1941) – Capt. Baker
- Hard Guy (1941) – Steve Randall
- The Bugle Sounds (1942) – Captain (uncredited)
- A Gentleman at Heart (1942) – Steve – Detective
- Spy Smasher (1942, Serial) – Alan Armstrong / Spy Smasher / Jack Armstrong
- Action in the North Atlantic (1943) – Ensign Wright (uncredited)
- There's Something About a Soldier (1943) – Sgt. Cummings (uncredited)
- Three Russian Girls (1943) – Sergei
- Ladies Courageous (1944) – Alex Anderson
- Bermuda Mystery (1944) – Frank Martin
- Roger Touhy, Gangster (1944) – Mason
- Haunted Harbor (1944, Serial) – Jim Marsden
- Brenda Starr, Reporter (1945, Serial) – Lt. Larry Farrell
- Jungle Raiders (1945, Serial) – Bob Moore
- The Tiger Woman (1945) – Jerry Devery
- Black Market Babies (1945) – Eddie Condon
- The Shadow Returns (1946) – Lamont Cranston
- Passkey to Danger (1946) – Tex Hanlon
- Behind the Mask (1946) – The Shadow / Lamont Cranston
- Don't Gamble with Strangers (1946) – Mike Samo
- Traffic in Crime (1946) – Sam Wire
- The Missing Lady (1946) – Lamont Cranston (The Shadow)
- Black Gold (1947) – Stanley Lowell
- Brick Bradford (1947, Serial) – Brick Bradford
- Stage Struck (1948) – Nick Mantee (final film role)
