= Joseph Crehan =

American actor (1883–1966)

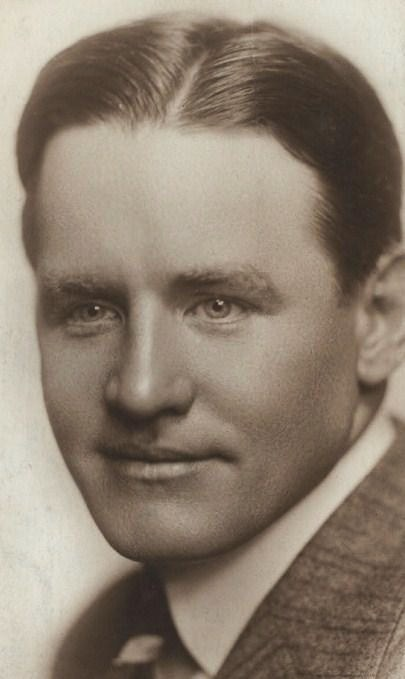
- Crehan in 1920
- Born: Joseph A. Creaghan; July 15, 1883; Baltimore, Maryland, U.S.
- Died: April 15, 1966 (aged 82); Hollywood, California, U.S.
- Occupation: Actor
- Years active: 1916–1965
- Spouse: Dorothy R. Lord (m. 1933)
- Children: 1

Joseph Crehan (born Joseph Creaghan; July 15, 1883 – April 15, 1966) was an American film actor. He appeared in more than 300 films between 1916 and 1965, and notably played Ulysses S. Grant nine times between 1939 and 1958, most memorably in Union Pacific and They Died with Their Boots On.

== Early life ==
Born in Baltimore, Maryland, he was the son of Mr. and Mrs. Mathew Crehan. He attended Calvert Hall College and Kent College of Law but left the latter because of his stronger interest in drama. Early in his career, Crehan worked in light comedy. He was in his late 30s when he began doing character roles.

== Career ==
Crehan's career began in 1907 in Philadelphia as a member of the Chestnut Street Theater's stock company. After that he acted in Baltimore, Boston, and Washington. He was seen in the film Under Two Flags (1916). He acted with the Morosco Stock Company in Los Angeles for several years.

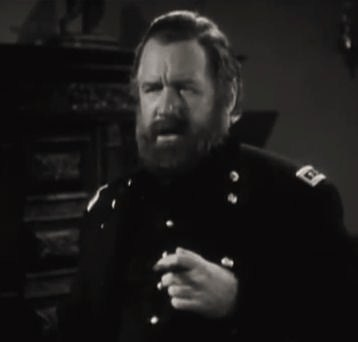
Crehan in Colorado (1940)

Crehan's Broadway credits include Twentieth Century (1932), Lilly Turner (1932), Angels Don't Kiss (1932), Those We Love (1930), Sweet Land of Liberty (1929), Merry Andrew (1929), Ringside (1928), and Yosemite (1914). Crehan often played alongside Charles C. Wilson with whom he is sometimes confused.

Crehan frequently portrayed Ulysses S. Grant in films. By June 1939 he had been seen as Grant in 42 films, 31 as the general and 11 as the president.

In 1961, credited as "Joe Crehan", he appeared as "Thomas Boland" in the TV Western series Bat Masterson (S3E18 "The Prescott Campaign").

== Death ==
On April 15, 1966, Crehan died of a stroke in Hollywood, California.

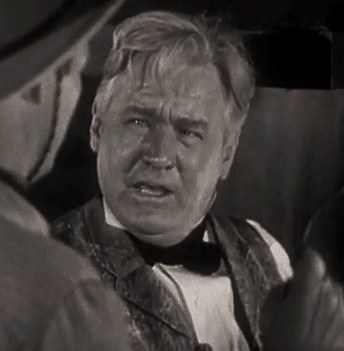
Crehan in Nevada City (1941)

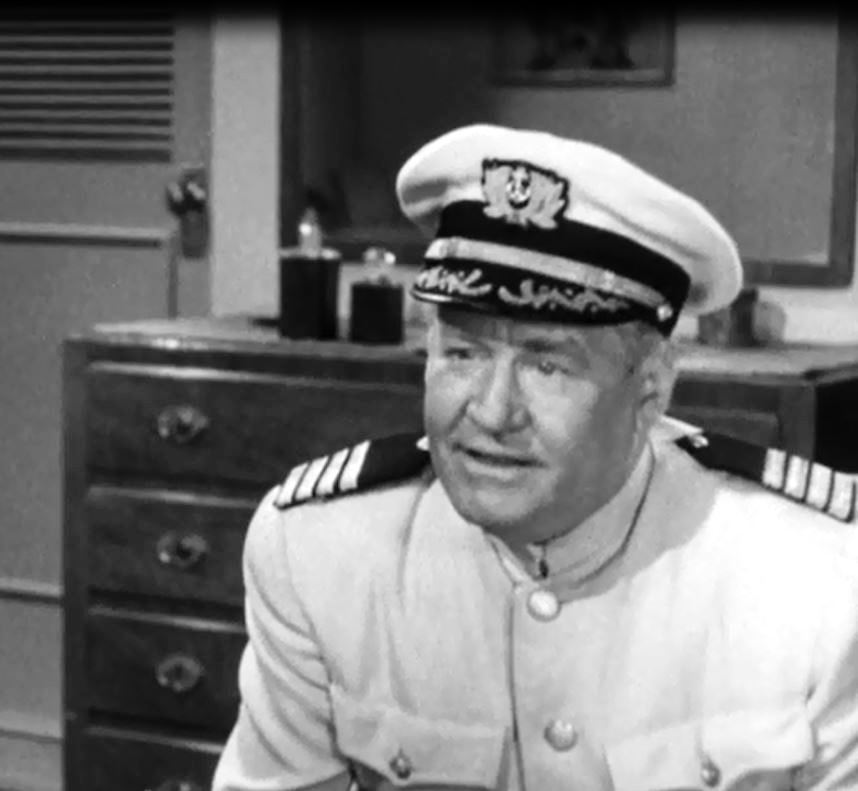
Crehan in Dangerous Money (1946)

== Selected filmography ==
- Under Two Flags (1916) as Rake
- Stolen Heaven (1931) as Henry, Steve's Butler
- Secrets of a Secretary (1931) as Reporter (uncredited)
- Before Midnight (1933) as Police Captain Frank Flynn
- Beyond the Law (1934) as Chief Anderson
- Among the Missing (1934) as Detective O'Malley
- Against the Law (1934) as Captain Elliott
- The Line-Up (1934) as Police Captain Daniel McGrath
- It Happened One Night (1934) as Detective
- Traveling Saleslady (1935) as Murdock
- Black Fury (1935) as Farrell
- Go into Your Dance (1935) as H.P. Jackson
- Oil for the Lamps of China (1935) as Clements
- Stranded (1935) as Johnny Quinn
- Front Page Woman (1935) as Spike Kiley
- Page Miss Glory (1935) as Detective Chief
- Bright Lights (1935) as Post Office Attendant
- Special Agent (1935) as Police Commissioner
- The Case of the Lucky Legs (1935) as Detective Johnson
- The Payoff (1935) as Harvey
- Frisco Kid (1935) as McClanahan
- Bengal Tiger (1936) as Bill Hinsdale
- Bullets or Ballots (1936) as Grand Jury Spokesman
- Earthworm Tractors (1936) as Mr. Henderson
- Trailin' West (1936) as Colonel Douglas
- Anthony Adverse (1936) as Captain Elisha Jorham
- China Clipper (1936) as Jim Horn
- Cain and Mabel (1936) as Tom Reed's Boxing Manager
- Road Gang (1936) as Harry Shields
- Gold Diggers of 1937 (1936) as Chairman
- Smart Blonde (1937) as 'Tiny' Torgenson
- Talent Scout (1937) as A.J. Lambert
- There Goes My Girl (1937) as Sergeant Wood
- The Go Getter (1937) as Karl Stone
- Kid Galahad (1937) as Brady
- This Is My Affair (1937) as Priest
- The Case of the Stuttering Bishop (1937) as Paul Drake
- Born Reckless (1937) as District Attorney
- The Wrong Road (1937) as District Attorney
- Here's Flash Casey (1938) as Blaine
- Happy Landing (1938) as Agent
- Night Spot (1938) as Inspector Wayland
- Alexander's Ragtime Band (1938) as Stage Manager
- Four's a Crowd (1938) as Butler Pierce
- Billy the Kid Returns (1938) as U.S. Marshal Dave Conway
- Girls on Probation (1938) as Todd
- Gang Bullets (1938) as Wallace
- Star Reporter (1939) as Gordon, Newspaper Editor
- Whispering Enemies (1939) as George Harley
- Society Lawyer (1939) as City Editor
- You Can't Get Away with Murder (1939) as Warden
- Union Pacific (1939) as General Ulysses S. Grant
- Tell No Tales (1939) as Chalmers
- Maisie (1939) as Defense Attorney Wilcox
- Babes in Arms (1939) as Mr. Essex
- Hollywood Cavalcade (1939) as Attorney
- The Roaring Twenties (1939) as Mr. Fletcher, the Foreman (uncredited)
- The Return of Doctor X (1939) as Editor
- Navy Secrets (1939) as Captain Daly, Navy Intelligence Officer
- Music in My Heart (1940) as Mark C. Gilman
- Emergency Squad (1940) as H. Tyler Joyce, Editor
- The Green Hornet (1940 serial) as Judge Stanton
- The House Across the Bay (1940) as Federal Man
- Gaucho Serenade (1940) as Edward Martin
- Brother Orchid (1940) as Brother MacEwen
- Colorado (1940) as General Ulysses S. Grant (uncredited)
- City for Conquest (1940) as Doctor
- South to Karanga (1940) as Ridgley (uncredited)
- The Secret Seven (1940) as Police Chief Hobbs
- Texas Rangers Ride Again (1940) as Johnson
- Scattergood Baines (1941) as Keith
- Andy Hardy's Private Secretary (1941) as Peter Dugan
- Washington Melodrama (1941) as Phil Sampson
- Love Crazy (1941) as Judge
- Nevada City (1941) as Mark Benton
- Manpower (1941) as Sweeney
- Nine Lives Are Not Enough (1941) as Yates
- Texas (1941) as Dusty King
- Three Girls About Town (1941) as Labor Leader (uncredited)
- They Died with Their Boots On (1941) as President Ulysses S. Grant (uncredited)
- The Courtship of Andy Hardy (1942) as Peter Dugan
- Junior Army (1942) as Mr. Jeffrey Ferguson
- Eyes of the Underworld (1942) as Assistant Police Chief Kirby
- Sealed Lips (1942) as Chief Charles R. Dugan
- Gang Busters (1942, Serial) as Police Chief Martin O'Brien
- Murder in the Big House (1942) as Jim F. Ainslee
- Larceny, Inc. (1942) as Warden
- Adventures of the Flying Cadets (1943, Serial) as Colonel George Bolton
- Mystery Broadcast (1943) as Chief Daniels
- She Has What It Takes (1943) as George Clarke
- Hands Across the Border (1944) as Jeff Adams
- Phantom Lady (1944) as Detective
- The Navy Way (1944) as Chaplain Benson
- The Great Alaskan Mystery (1944, Serial) as Bill Hudson
- The Adventures of Mark Twain (1944) as Ulysses S. Grant / Riverboat Captain
- Black Magic (1944) as Police Sergeant Matthews
- Man Alive (1945) as Dr. James P. Whitney
- Dick Tracy (1945) as Police Chief Brandon
- The Shadow Returns (1946) as Police Inspector Cardona
- Deadline at Dawn (1946) as Lieutenant Kane
- Strange Journey (1946) as Thompson
- The Phantom Thief (1946) as 'Jumbo' Madigan, Pawnbroker
- O.S.S. (1946) as General Donovan
- The Big Sleep (1946) as Medical Examiner (uncredited)
- Dangerous Money (1946) as Captain Black
- Dick Tracy vs. Cueball (1946) as Chief Brandon
- The Falcon's Adventure (1946) as Inspector Cavanaugh
- Behind the Mask (1946) as Police Inspector Cardonna
- Monsieur Verdoux (1947) as Broker (uncredited)
- Dick Tracy Meets Gruesome (1947) as Chief Brandon
- Louisiana (1947) as Neilson
- Philo Vance's Gamble (1947) as District Attorney Ellis Mason
- Adventures in Silverado (1948) as McHugh
- The Hunted (1948) as Police Captain
- Night Time in Nevada (1948) as Engineer Casey
- The Countess of Monte Cristo (1948) as Joe
- Street Corner (1948) as Dr. James Fenton
- The Last Bandit (1949) as Local Number 44 Engineer
- Prejudice (1949) as J. P. Baker
- Triple Trouble (1950) as Warden Burnside
- Pride of Maryland (1951) as Mr. Herndon
- Roadblock (1951) as Thompson (uncredited)
- The Family Secret (1951) as Bailiff (uncredited)
- Deadline - U.S.A. (1952) as City Editor (uncredited)
- Crazylegs (1953) as Hank Hatch
- Highway Dragnet (1954) as Elderly Border Inspection Officer
- Alfred Hitchcock Presents (1961) (Season 6 Episode 25: "Museum Piece") as Juror (uncredited)
- Judgment at Nuremberg (1961) as Courtroom Spectator at verdict (uncredited)
