= The Man Who Cried Wolf (film) =

1937 film by Lewis R. Foster

- Directed by: Lewis R. Foster
- Written by: Charles Grayson; Sy Bartlett
- Based on: Too Clever to Live by Arthur Rohlsfel
- Produced by: E.M. Asher
- Starring: Lewis Stone; Barbara Read; Tom Brown
- Cinematography: George Robinson
- Edited by: Frank Gross
- Music by: Charles Previn
- Production company: Universal Pictures
- Distributed by: Universal Pictures
- Release date: August 29, 1937
- Running time: 68 minutes
- Country: United States
- Language: English

The Man Who Cried Wolf is a 1937 American crime drama film directed by Lewis R. Foster to a screenplay by Charles Grayson from Arthur Rohlsfel's story Too Clever to Live. The film featured Lewis Stone, Barbara Read, Tom Brown.

== Plot ==
An actor prepares for a real murder by confessing to police to murders that he didn't commit.

== Cast ==
- Lewis Stone as Lawrence Fontaine
- Barbara Read as Nan
- Tom Brown as Tommy Bradley
- Forrester Harvey as Jocko
- Jameson Thomas as George Bradley
- Marjorie Main as Amelia Bradley
- Robert Gleckler as Capt. Walter Reid
- Billy Wayne as Halligan
