= Margo Lane =

- Art by Matt Wagner

Publication information
- Publisher: Street & Smith; Condé Nast
- First appearance: "The Shadow" (1937 – radio) "The Shadow Magazine" (1941 – print)

In-story information
- Supporting character of: The Shadow

Margo Lane is a fictional character in The Shadow stories. Margo is a friend and companion to Lamont Cranston, and an agent for his alter ego, The Shadow, in the wealthy set. Her first appearance was in 1937 in The Shadow radio drama. Her first appearance in a print story was in The Thunder King, a story in the June 15, 1941, issue of The Shadow Magazine.

== Origins ==
Margo was created for the radio version of The Shadow in 1937, because it was felt that having Harry Vincent as The Shadow's chief aid, and thus two male voices, would not provide sufficient "vocal contrast". Margo was based on socialite Brenda Frazier and You Can't Take It with You star Margot Stevenson. The relationship between Lamont and Margo was modelled on the Thin Man film series. During World War II, Walter B. Gibson felt he could no longer write stories about spy rings, since they had now become a reality. Instead, he focused on whodunits, which suited the Cranston persona of the Shadow. Thus, the character of Margo came to the fore, and eventually became a permanent fixture in the stories, finally being promoted to a full agent. Margo appears in at least 55 of the Shadow novels.

== Character ==
While on radio Margo is The Shadow's confidante, in the novels Margo is depicted as a somewhat helpful nuisance who for years suspects but cannot prove the true identity of the Shadow, until finally in later years she becomes a full agent for the mysterious crimefighter.

== Portrayal ==
She was portrayed on radio by Agnes Moorehead, who was followed by Margot Stevenson, Marjorie Anderson, Lesley Woods, Grace Matthews, and Gertrude Warner.

In an unaired 1954 TV pilot, Paula Raymond played Margo Lane opposite Tom Helmore as The Shadow.

On film, Veda Ann Borg matched wits with Victor Jory's Shadow in 1940; Barbara Reed portrayed her three times in the mid-1940s with Kane Richmond; and Penelope Ann Miller was Margo opposite Alec Baldwin in 1994's The Shadow.

== On the radio and in the novels ==
Margo's introduction to the novels created a storm of controversy reflected in the magazine's letters page. Older fans resented her intrusion, whereas newer readers, perhaps more familiar with the radio show than the pulp novel, accepted her readily.

- In the novels her name is "Margo", while on radio it is "Margot".
- In the novels she originally does not know Lamont is the Shadow, whereas on radio she does.

== In other media ==
=== Comics ===
In the DC Comics book series The Shadow Strikes!, Margot is the daughter of a wealthy Southern landowner and a black prostitute. She is portrayed as one of the Shadow's chief agents.

=== Film ===
Penelope Ann Miller as Margo Lane in the 1994 film The Shadow.

In the 1994 film, The Shadow, Margo (Penelope Ann Miller) has had psychic powers her whole life. Her father, Dr. Reinhardt Lane (Ian McKellen), is a scientist working to develop a new type of power source, using an implosive device to be contained within a beryllium sphere, which the villainous Shiwan Khan (John Lone) tries to turn into a weapon. Lamont Cranston (Alec Baldwin) and Margo first meet at the Cobalt Club, where they find they have an instant attraction. After they go out to dinner together, Lamont realizes that Margo has psychic powers and fears that she may uncover his secret identity as the Shadow if they spend more time together, so he vows never to see her again. However, when Khan begins controlling her father's mind, Margo approaches Lamont and Police Commissioner Wainwright Barth (Jonathan Winters) for help. Khan hypnotizes Margo and orders her to kill the Shadow. She proceeds immediately to Lamont's mansion and (unsuccessfully) attempts to shoot Lamont, who breaks the trance. Upon waking from the trance, she realizes that Lamont is the Shadow and volunteers to help him defeat Shiwan Khan and rescue her father. Together they investigate the last known sighting of Khan, a mysterious empty lot that every one in the city - Lamont included - believes was once the site of the Hotel Monolith; in reality, the hotel is still standing as Khan's base, but he has hypnotised the entire city so that they are unable to see it. When Khan's henchman Farley Claymore (Tim Curry) traps the Shadow in a high-pressure tank filling with water, the Shadow uses his psychic powers to contact Margo and she comes to rescue him. In the climax of the movie, Margo helps her father defuse the detonation device within the beryllium sphere (that has now become an atomic bomb), helping to save the day.

== In the Wold Newton universe ==
- As part of the Wold Newton family, Philip José Farmer has suggested that Margo and Lois Lane are sisters. This notion was extended in the Dick Tracy comic strip on November 8, 2014, when it was suggested that Margo and Lois are both sisters to Kandikane Lane.
- While The Shadow was licensed to DC Comics, Superman Family #188 (April, 1978) established Margo to be a distant cousin of Lois Lane in a letter answered by E. Nelson Bridwell. In it he debunks Farmer's idea that they are sisters and instead says they are both descendants of Lazarus Lane, the Western comic book character.
