= The Leather Pushers (1922 serial) =

1922 film

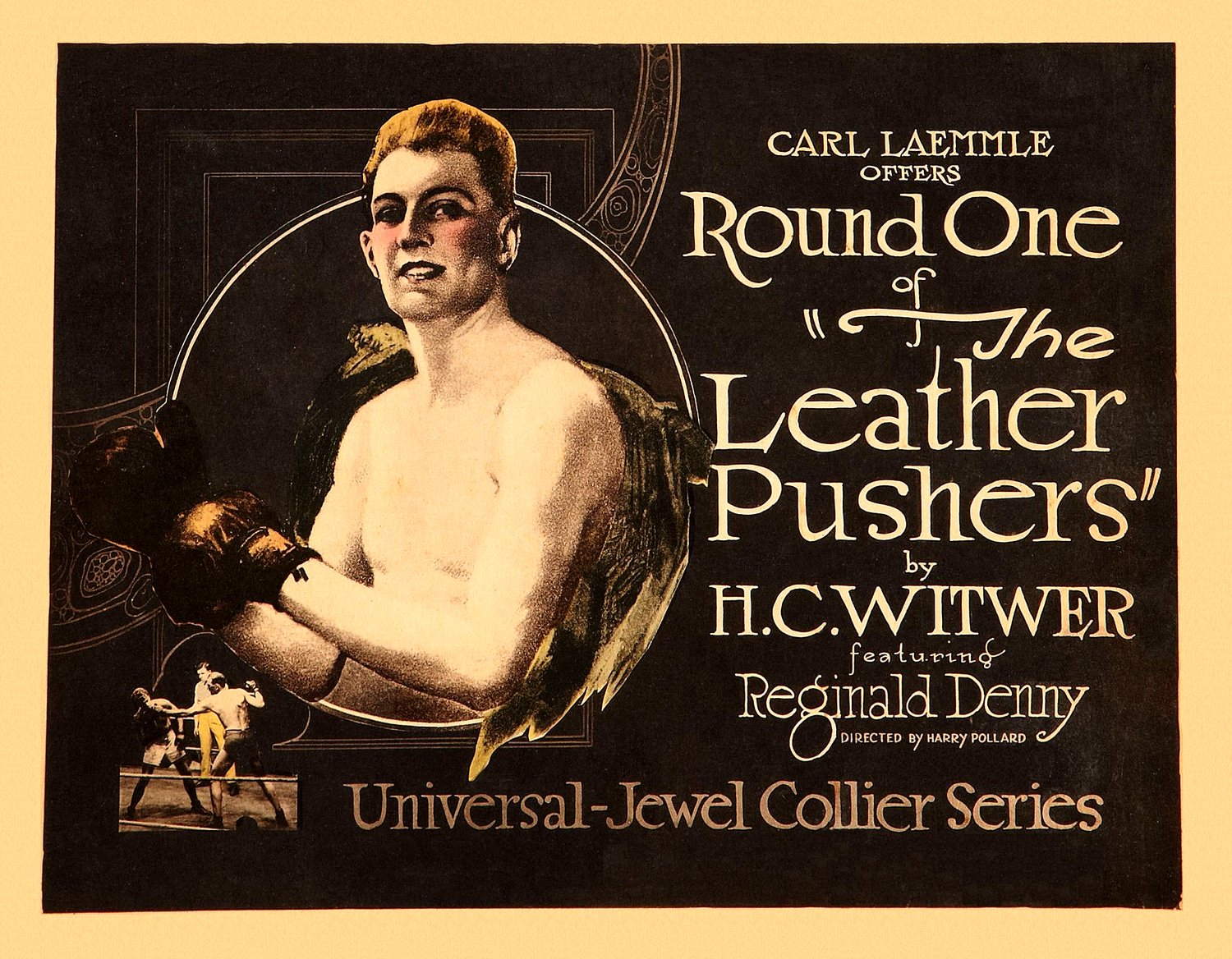
- Lobby card
- Directed by: Harry A. Pollard; Mal St. Clair
- Screenplay by: Darryl F. Zanuck
- Based on: stories by H. C. Witwer
- Production company: Universal Film Manufacturing Company
- Distributed by: Universal Film Manufacturing Company
- Release date: March 27, 1922
- Running time: 2 reels per episode
- Country: United States
- Language: Silent (English intertitles)

The Leather Pushers is a 1922 American film serial starring Reginald Denny (and Billy Sullivan in the fourth series), and based on boxing stories by H. C. Witwer originally published in Collier's Weekly. The screenplays were written by a young Darryl F. Zanuck.

== List of episodes ==
- 1: Let's Go
- 2: Round Two
- 3: Payment Through the Nose
- 4: A Fool and His Honey
- 5: The Taming of the Shrewd
- 6: Whipsawed
- 7: Young King Cole
- 8: He Raised Kane
- 9: The Chickasha Bone Crusher
- 10: When Kane Met Abel
- 11: Strike Father, Strike Son
- 12: Joan of Newark
- 13: The Wandering Two
- 14: The Widower's Mite
- 15: Don Coyote
- 16: Something for Nothing
- 17: Columbia, the Gem and the Ocean
- 18: Barnaby's Grudge

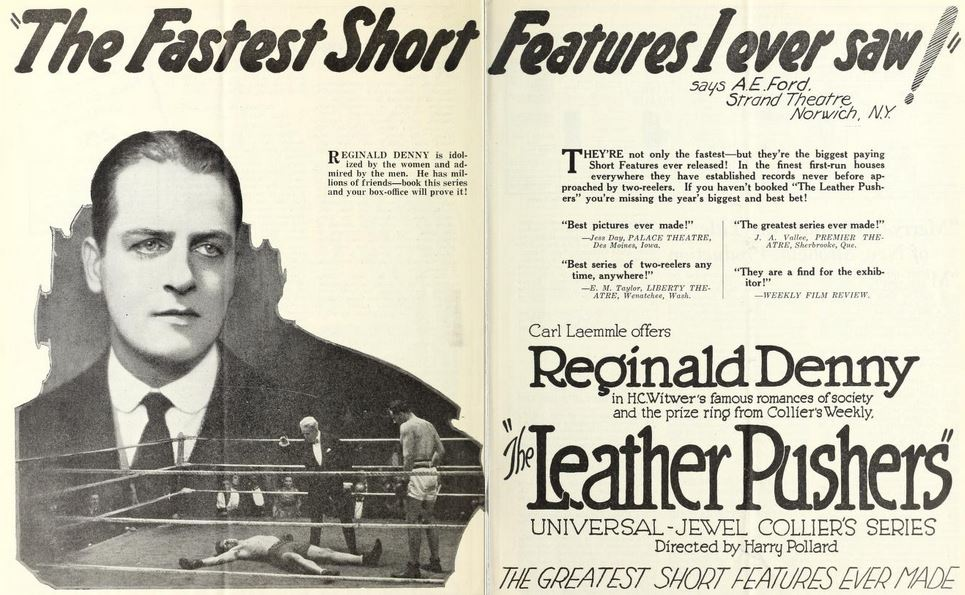
Film ad with Reginald Denny

== Preservation status ==
Only episodes 2 and 3 exist, along with a trailer for the series.

== See also ==
- List of boxing films
- List of film serials
