= List of comedy films of the 1930s =

A list of comedy films released in the 1930s.

Title	Director	Cast	Country	Subgenre/Notes
1930
Animal Crackers	Victor Heerman	Groucho Marx, Harpo Marx, Chico Marx	United States	
Brats	James Parrott	Stan Laurel, Oliver Hardy	United States	Short Film
The Cat Creeps	Rupert Julian	Helen Twelvetrees, Raymond Hackett, Neil Hamilton	United States	Comedy horror
Check and Double Check	Melville W. Brown	Freeman F. Gosden, Charles J. Correll, Sue Carol	United States	
The Cuckoos	Paul Sloane	Bert Wheeler, Robert Woolsey, Dorothy Lee	United States	
Dixiana	Luther Reed	Bebe Daniels, Everett Marshall, Bert Wheeler	United States	
Feet First	Clyde Bruckman	Harold Lloyd, Barbara Kent, Robert McWade	United States	
Half Shot at Sunrise	Paul Sloane	Bert Wheeler, Robert Woolsey, Dorothy Lee	United States	
He Knew Women	Hugh Herbert	Lowell Sherman, Alice Joyce, David Manners	United States	
Hook, Line and Sinker	Edward F. Cline	Bert Wheeler, Robert Woolsey, Dorothy Lee	United States	
Leathernecking	Edward F. Cline	Irene Dunne, Ken Murray, Louise Fazenda	United States	
Lovin' the Ladies	Melville W. Brown	Richard Dix, Lois Wilson, Allen Kearns	United States	
One Way Out			United States	Short Film
Queen High	Fred C. Newmeyer	Charles Ruggles, Frank Morgan, Ginger Rogers	United States	
The Rogue Song	Lionel Barrymore and Hal Roach	Lawrence Tibbett, Catherine Dale Owen, Nance O'Neil	United States	
The Runaway Bride	Donald Crisp	Mary Astor, Lloyd Hughes, Paul Hurst	United States	
She's My Weakness	Melville W. Brown	Arthur Lake, Sue Carol, William Collier Sr.	United States	
Shivering Shakespeare	Anthony Mack	Norman Chaney, Jackie Cooper, Allen Hoskins, Bobby Hutchins, and Mary Ann Jackson	United States	Short Film
Sin Takes a Holiday	Paul L. Stein	Constance Bennett, Kenneth MacKenna, Basil Rathbone	United States	
Teacher's Pet	Robert F. McGowan	Jackie Cooper as Jackie Matthew Beard as Hercules Norman Chaney as Chubby Dorothy DeBorba as Dorothy Allen Hoskins as Farina Bobby Hutchins as Wheezer Mary Ann Jackson as Mary Ann Buddy McDonald as Buddy	United States	Short Film
Whoopee!	Thornton Freeland	Eddie Cantor, Ethel Shutta, Paul Gregory	United States	
1931
Bachelor Apartment	Lowell Sherman	Lowell Sherman, Mae Murray, Irene Dunne	United States	
Beau Hunks	James W. Horne	Stan Laurel, Oliver Hardy, James W. Horne	United States	Short Film
The Big Shot	Ralph Murphy	Eddie Quillan, Maureen O'Sullivan, Mary Nolan	United States	
Caught Plastered	William Seiter	Bert Wheeler, Robert Woolsey, Dorothy Lee	United States	
Chickens Come Home	James W. Horne	Stan Laurel, Oliver Hardy, Mae Busch	United States	Short Film
City Lights	Charlie Chaplin	Charles Chaplin, Virginia Cherrill, Florence Lee	United States	
Cracked Nuts	Edward F. Cline	Bert Wheeler, Robert Woolsey, Dorothy Lee	United States	
Ever Since Eve			United States	
Everything's Rosie	Clyde Bruckman	Robert Woolsey, Anita Louise, John Darrow	United States	
Fanny Foley Herself	Melville W. Brown	Edna May Oliver, Hobart Bosworth, Florence Roberts	United States	
The Front Page	Lewis Milestone	Adolphe Menjou, Pat O'Brien, Mary Brian	United States	
Girls Demand Excitement	Seymour Felix	Virginia Cherrill, John Wayne, Marguerite Churchill	United States	
Helpmates	James Parrott	Stan Laurel and Oliver Hardy	United States	Short Film
The House That Shadows Built		Groucho Marx, Harpo Marx, Chico Marx	United States	Short Film
High Stakes	Lowell Sherman	Lowell Sherman, Mae Murray, Karen Morley	United States	
Laugh and Get Rich	Gregory La Cava	Edna May Oliver, Hugh Herbert, Dorothy Lee	United States	
Lonely Wives	Russell Mack	Edward Everett Horton, Esther Ralston, Laura La Plante	United States	
Monkey Business	Norman Z. McLeod	Groucho Marx, Harpo Marx, Chico Marx	United States	
Our Wife	James W. Horne	Stan Laurel, Oliver Hardy, James Finlayson	United States	Short Film
Peach O'Reno	William A. Seiter	Bert Wheeler, Robert Woolsey, Dorothy Lee	United States	
Platinum Blonde	Frank R. Capra	Jean Harlow, Loretta Young, Robert Williams	United States	
The Royal Bed	Lowell Sherman	Lowell Sherman, Mary Astor, Anthony Bushell	United States	
The Runaround	William James Craft	Geoffrey Kerr, Mary Brian, Johnny Hines	United States	
Sweepstakes	Albert S. Rogell	Eddie Quillan, Lew Cody, James Gleason	United States	
The Tip-Off	Albert S. Rogell	Eddie Quillan, Robert Armstrong, Ginger Rogers	United States	
Too Many Cooks	William A. Seiter	Bert Wheeler, Dorothy Lee, Roscoe Ates	United States	
White Shoulders	Melville W. Brown	Mary Astor, Jack Holt, Ricardo Cortez	United States	
1932
The Animal Kingdom	Edward H. Griffith	Ann Harding, Leslie Howard, Myrna Loy	United States	
County Hospital	James Parrott	Stan Laurel, Oliver Hardy, Billy Gilbert	United States	Short Film
The Dentist	Leslie Pearce	W.C. Fields, Marjorie Kane, Arnold Gray	United States	Short Film
Doctor X	Michael Curtiz	Lionel Atwill, Fay Wray, Lee Tracy	United States	Comedy horror
Girl Crazy	William A. Seiter	Bert Wheeler, Robert Woolsey, Dorothy Lee	United States	
The Half-Naked Truth	Gregory La Cava	Lupe Vélez, Lee Tracy, Eugene Pallette	United States	
Hold 'Em Jail	Norman Taurog	Bert Wheeler, Robert Woolsey, Edna May Oliver	United States	
The Hollywood Handicap		Marion Byron, Anita Stewart, Bert Wheeler	United States	Short Film
Horse Feathers	Norman Z. McLeod	Groucho Marx, Chico Marx, Harpo Marx	United States	
Ladies of the Jury	Lowell Sherman	Edna May Oliver, Jill Esmond, Ken Murray	United States	
Lady with a Past	Edward H. Griffith	Constance Bennett, Ben Lyon, David Manners	United States	
Little Orphan Annie	John S. Robertson	Mitzi Green, Buster Phelps, May Robson	United States	
Love Me Tonight	Rouben Mamoulian	Maurice Chevalier, Jeanette MacDonald, Charles Ruggles	United States	
Movie Crazy	Clyde Bruckman	Harold Lloyd, Constance Cummings, Kenneth Thomson	United States	
The Music Box	James Parrott	Stan Laurel, Oliver Hardy	United States	Short Film
The Old Dark House	James Whale	Boris Karloff, Melvyn Douglas, Charles Laughton	United States	Comedy horror
The Penguin Pool Murder	George Archainbaud	Edna May Oliver, Robert Armstrong, James Gleason	United States	Comedy mystery
Rebecca of Sunnybrook Farm	Alfred Santell	Marian Nixon, Ralph Bellamy, Mae Marsh	United States	Comedy drama
Running Hollywood		Charles 'Buddy' Rogers, Arthur Lake, Sally Blane	United States	Short Film
A Successful Calamity	John G. Adolfi	George Arliss, Mary Astor, Evalyn Knapp	United States	Comedy drama
That's My Boy	Roy William Neill	Richard Cromwell, Dorothy Jordan, Mae Marsh	United States	
This Is the Night	Frank Tuttle	Roland Young, Thelma Todd, Cary Grant	United States	
Trouble in Paradise	Ernst Lubitsch	Miriam Hopkins, Kay Francis, Herbert Marshall	United States	
The Voice of Hollywood No, 13			United States	Short Film
A Woman Commands	Paul L. Stein	Pola Negri, Roland Young, Basil Rathbone	United States	
1933
Aggie Appleby Maker of Men			United States	
The Barber Shop			United States	Short Film
Bed of Roses			United States	
Blind Adventure			United States	comedy-drama
Bombshell			United States	
Busy Bodies		Stan Laurel, Oliver Hardy, Dick Gilbert, Charlie Hall	United States	Short Film
Christopher Bean			United States	
Dinner at Eight			United States	
Diplomaniacs			United States	
Duck Soup	Leo McCarey	Groucho Marx, Harpo Marx, Chico Marx, Zeppo Marx	United States	
The Fatal Glass of Beer			United States	Short Film
Flying Down to Rio			United States	musical comedy
Goldie Gets Along			United States	comedy-drama
Goodbye Love			United States	
Happy			United Kingdom	musical comedy
His Private Secretary			United States	
International House			United States	
It's Great to Be Alive			United States	
I'm No Angel			United States	
Melody Cruise			United States	romantic comedy
The Midnight Patrol			United States	Short Film
Our Betters			United States	
Professional Sweetheart			United States	romantic comedy
Rafter Romance			United States	romantic comedy
Sailor Be Good			United States	
She Done Him Wrong			United States	
So this is Africa			United States	
Sons of the Desert			United States	
Topaze			United States	comedy-drama
Twice Two			United States	Short Film
1934
The Affairs of Cellini			United States	
Babes in Toyland			United States	
Bachelor Bait			United States	
By Your Leave			United States	
The Cat's-Paw			United States	
Cockeyed Cavaliers			United States	
The Dover Road			United States	romantic comedy
Down to Their Last Yacht			United States	
The Gay Divorcee			United States	romantic musical comedy
Going Bye Bye			United States	Short Film
Hips, Hips, Hooray!			United States	
It Happened One Night			United States	
It's a Gift			United States	
Kentucky Kernels			United States	
Lightning Strikes Twice			United States	
The Meanest Gal in Town			United States	
Odor in the Court			United States	Short Film
Punch Drunks			United States	Short Film
The Richest Girl in the World			United States	
Sing and Like It			United States	
Strictly Dynamite			United States	comedy-drama
The Thin Man			United States	
Tit for Tat			United States	Short Film
We're Rich Again			United States	
Woman Haters			United States	Short Film
1935
Another Face			United States	comedy-drama
Boys Will Be Boys			United Kingdom	
Captain Hurricane			United States	comedy-drama
Dandy Dick			United Kingdom	
Enchanted April			United States	comedy-drama
The Farmer Takes a Wife			United States	
The Ghost Goes West			United Kingdom	
Hi, Gaucho!			United States	
His Family Tree			United States	
Hooray for Love			United States	musical comedy
Hot Tip			United States	musical comedy
I Dream Too Much			United States	romantic comedy
In Person			United States	romantic comedy
Laddie			United States	comedy-drama
Man on the Flying Trapeze			United States	
A Night at the Opera			United States	
The Nitwits			United States	
Paradise Canyon			United States	
Pop Goes the Easel			United States	Short Film
The Rainmakers			United States	
Romance in Manhattan			United States	romantic comedy
Ruggles of Red Gap			United States	
Star of Midnight			United States	comedy mystery
Thicker than Water			United States	Short Film
To Beat the Band			United States	comedy mystery
Top Hat			United States	
1936
The Bride Walks Out			United States	romantic comedy
Bunker Bean			United States	romantic comedy
Dancing Pirate			United States	musical comedy
The Ex-Mrs. Bradford			United States	comedy-mystery
The Farmer in the Dell			United States	musical comedy
Follow the Fleet			United States	musical comedy
Good Morning, Boys			United Kingdom	
Libeled Lady			United States	
Love on a Bet			United States	romantic comedy
Make Way for a Lady			United States	romantic comedy
The Milky Way			United States	
Modern Times			United States	
Movie Maniacs			United States	Short Film
Mr. Deeds Goes to Town			United States	
Mummy's Boys			United States	
My Man Godfrey			United States	
Silly Billies			United States	
Smartest Girl in Town			United States	
Swing Time			United States	musical comedy
Sylvia Scarlett			United States	romantic comedy
Theodora Goes Wild			United States	
Walking on Air			United States	
Wife vs. Secretary			United States	
1937
All Over Town			United States	
The Awful Truth			United States	
The Big Shot			United States	
Breakfast for Two			United States	
A Damsel in Distress			United States	
A Day at the Races			United States	
Don't Tell the Wife			United States	
Double Wedding			United States	
Fight for Your Lady			United States	
Fit for a King			United States	
Forty Naughty Girls			United States	
Hideaway			United States	
High Flyers			United States	
History Is Made At Night			United States	
Hitting a New High			United States	
Keep Fit			United Kingdom	
The King and the Chorus Girl			United States	
The Life of the Party			United States	
Make a Wish			United States	
Meet the Missus			United States	
Music for Madame			United States	
New Faces of 1937			United States	musical comedy
Nothing Sacred			United States	
Oh, Mr Porter!			United Kingdom	
On Again-Off Again			United States	musical comedy
Quick Money			United States	musical comedy
Riding on Air			United States	
Shall We Dance			United States	
She's Got Everything			United States	
Super-Sleuth			United States	
That Girl from Paris			United States	musical comedy
There Goes My Girl			United States	
There Goes the Groom			United States	
They Wanted to Marry			United States	romantic comedy
Too Many Wives			United States	romantic comedy
Topper			United States	
Way Out West			United States	
We're on the Jury			United States	
When's Your Birthday?			United States	
Wise Girl			United States	
You Can't Beat Love			United States	
1938
The Affairs of Annabel			United States	
The Amazing Dr. Clitterhouse			United States	
Annabel Takes a Tour			United States	
Ask A Policeman			United Kingdom	
Blond Cheat			United States	
Bringing Up Baby			United States	
Carefree			United States	musical comedy
Crashing Hollywood			United States	
The Divorce of Lady X			United Kingdom	
Everybody's Doing It			United States	
Go Chase Yourself			United States	
Having Wonderful Time			United States	romantic comedy
It's in the Air			United Kingdom	
Joy of Living			United States	
Love Finds Andy Hardy			United States	
The Mad Miss Manton			United States	
Maid's Night Out			United States	
Mr. Doodle Kicks Off			United States	
Next Time I Marry			United States	
Night Spot			United States	
Old Bones of the River			United Kingdom	
Peck's Bad Boy with the Circus			United Kingdom	
Professor Beware			United States	
Pygmalion			United Kingdom	
Radio City Revels			United States	musical comedy
Rebecca of Sunnybrook Farm			United States	Comedy drama
Room Service			United States	
A Slight Case of Murder			United States	
Termites of 1938			United States	Short Film
This Marriage Business			United States	
Vivacious Lady			United States	
You Can't Take It with You			United States	
1939
At the Circus			United States	
Bachelor Mother			United States	
The Cat and the Canary			United States	Comedy horror
The Cowboy Quarterback			United States	
Dancing Co-Ed			United States	
East Side of Heaven			United States	
Escape to Paradise			United States	musical comedy
Fifth Avenue Girl			United States	
The Flying Deuces			United States	
The Girl from Mexico			United States	
Honolulu			United States	
It's a Wonderful World			United States	
Mr. Smith Goes to Washington			United States	
Ninotchka			United States	
Topper Takes a Trip			United States	
Trouble Brewing			United Kingdom	
Where's That Fire?			United Kingdom	
The Women	George Cukor	Norma Shearer, Joan Crawford, Rosalind Russell	United States	
