= Thelma Todd =

American actress (1906–1935)

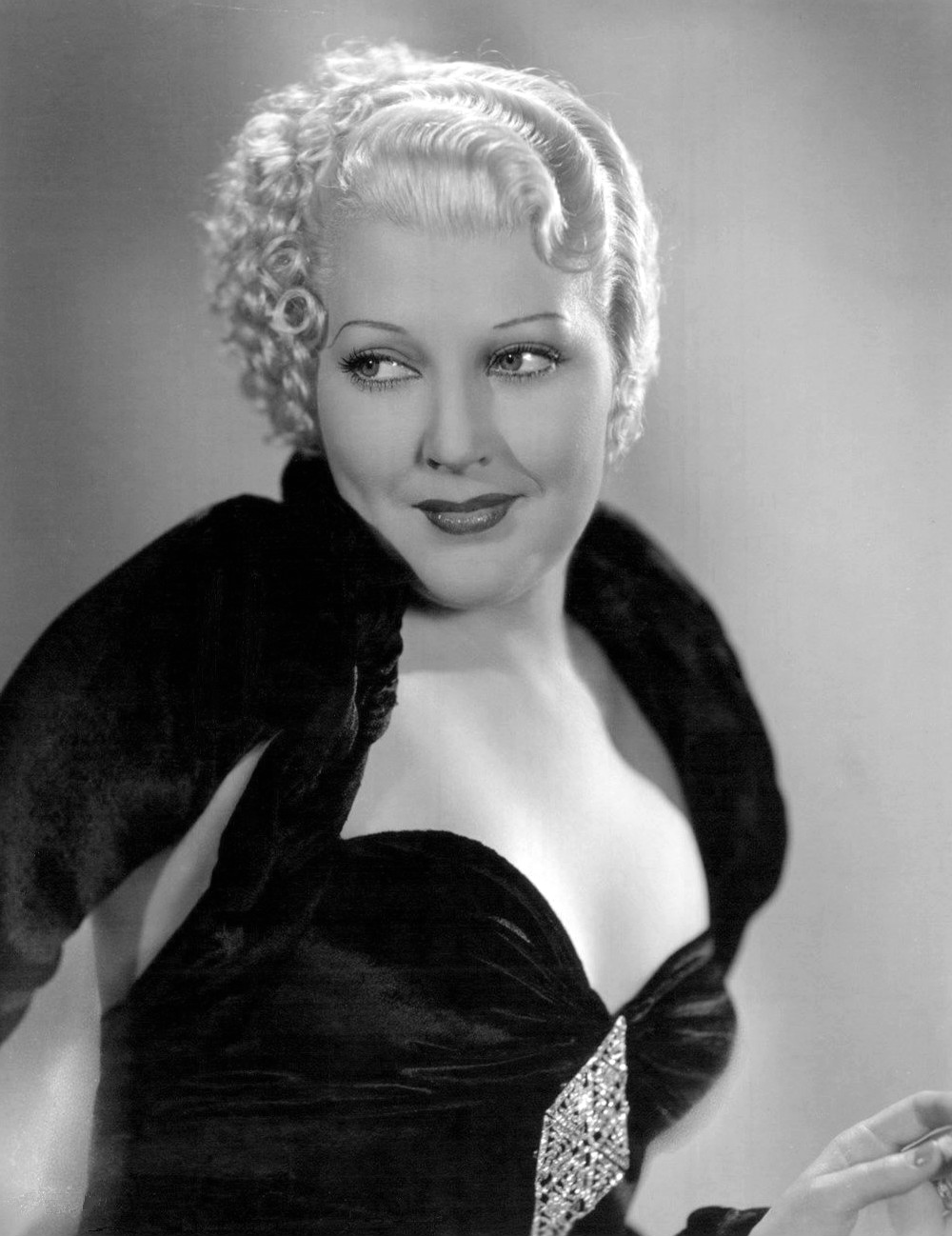
- Todd, c. 1933
- Born: Thelma Alice Todd; July 29, 1906; Lawrence, Massachusetts, U.S.
- Died: December 16, 1935 (aged 29); Los Angeles, California, U.S.
- Cause of death: Carbon monoxide poisoning (suspicious)
- Other name: Alison Loyd
- Occupation: Actress
- Years active: 1926–1935
- Spouse: Pat DiCicco (m. 1932; div. 1934)

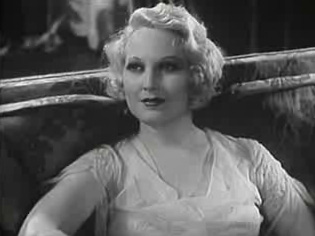
Todd in Corsair (1931)

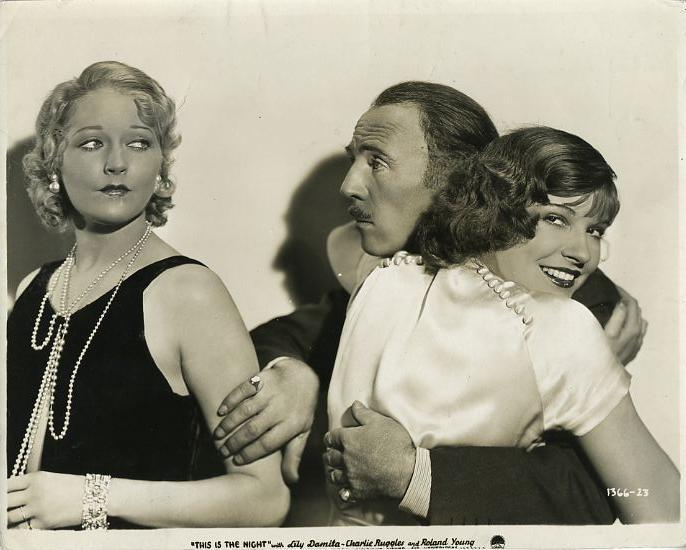
Todd, Roland Young, Lili Damita in This Is the Night (1932)

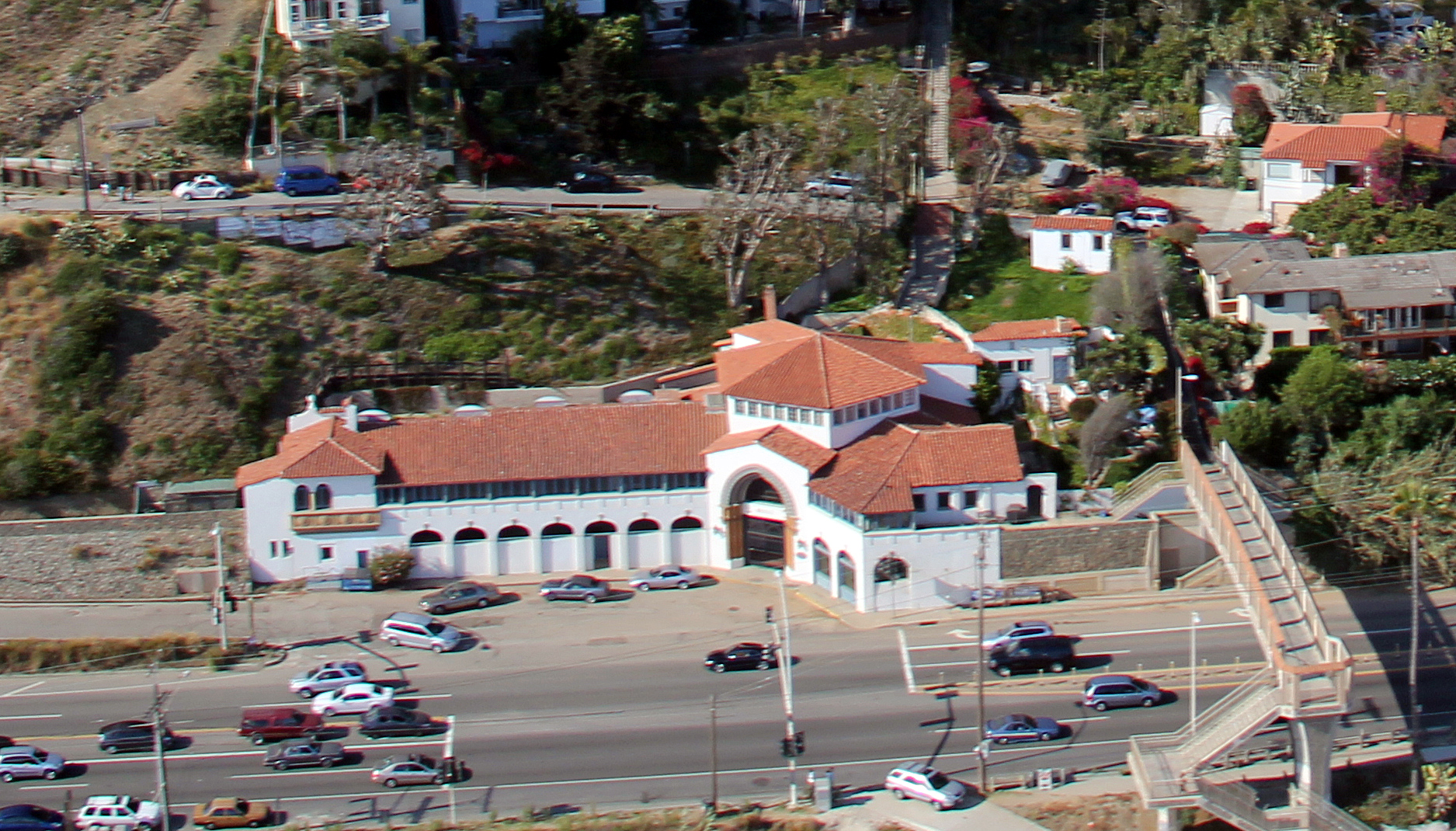
Thelma Todd's Sidewalk Cafe, 17575 Pacific Coast Highway, Pacific Palisades

Sidewalk Café
- Cocktail Room. Jewel Carmen's residence can be seen on the hill in the background.
- House of Jewel Carmen, 1930
- Thelma Todd's Inn postcard
- Thelma Todd at Sidewalk Café Entrance
- Sidewalk Café, Exterior 1933
- Sidewalk Café, Exterior 1935
- Thelma Todd in her car 1935
- garage, Exterior, distant 1935
- garage, Exterior, close 1935
- Photo diagram 1935
- Chez Roland Beach Club, 1949

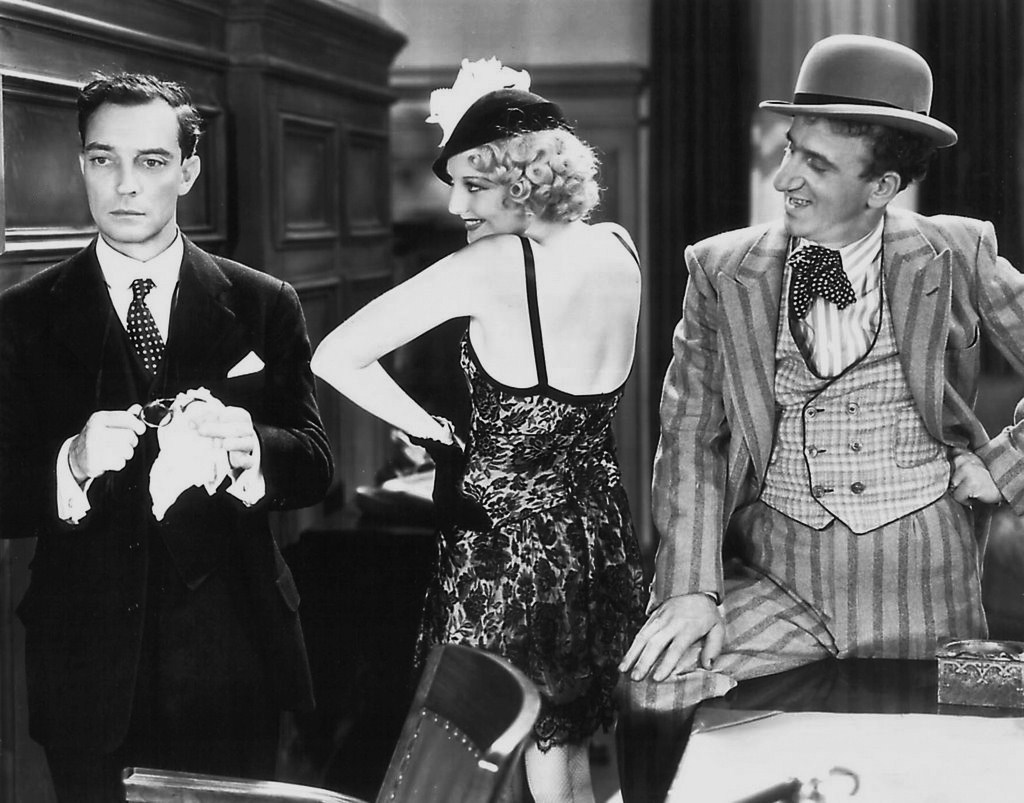
Buster Keaton, Todd, and Jimmy Durante in Speak Easily (1932)

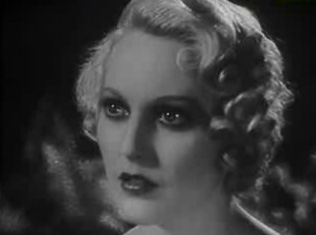
Todd in Corsair (1931)

Thelma Alice Todd (July 29, 1906 – December 16, 1935) was an American actress and businesswoman, variously nicknamed "the Ice Cream Blonde" and "Hot Toddy". She appeared in about 120 feature films and shorts between 1926 and 1935.

She is remembered for comedic roles, including opposite ZaSu Pitts in 17 shorts; in Monkey Business and Horse Feathers with the Marx Brothers; and in a number of Charley Chase's short comedies. She co-starred with Buster Keaton and Jimmy Durante in Speak Easily, and appeared in Wheeler and Woolsey and Laurel and Hardy films. Her role in The Bohemian Girl was greatly reduced in post-production following her unexpected death in 1935 at the age of 29.

Todd was found dead in her car while parked in the garage at the home of a friend, apparently from carbon monoxide poisoning. Her death was officially ruled accidental, but the circumstances have remained the subject of debate.

== Early life ==
Thelma Alice Todd was born on July 29, 1906, in Lawrence, Massachusetts, to John Shaw Todd, an upholsterer from Ireland, and later, a superintendent of streets, an alderman, and Lawrence's commissioner of health and charities in 1912 and Alice Elizabeth Edwards, an immigrant from Canada. She had an elder brother, William, who died in an accident in 1910. She was a bright and successful student. Intending to become a schoolteacher, she enrolled at the Lowell Normal School (now University of Massachusetts, Lowell) after graduating from high school in 1923. As a student, she earned money as a model, entered beauty pageants in her late teens, gained the attention of Elks Lodge 65, was crowned 1925 Miss Lawrence, and won the title of 1925 Miss Massachusetts. While representing her home state, she was spotted by a Hollywood talent scout. She was offered a slot at the Paramount Players School in Astoria, Queens, New York City, at a time when Paramount Studios was training would-be-actors in acting, diction, athletics, and manners. Of the 16 members of her cohort, only Charles "Buddy" Rogers also made it to Hollywood. Todd later found work, in 1929, at Hal Roach Studios.

== Career ==
=== Film ===
During the silent film era, Todd appeared in numerous supporting roles that made full use of her beauty, but gave her little chance to act. With the advent of the talkies, she was able to expand her roles when producer Hal Roach signed her to appear with comedy stars such as Harry Langdon, Charley Chase, and Laurel and Hardy.

In 1931, Roach cast Todd in her own series of 17- to 27-minute slapstick comedy shorts. To create a female version of Laurel and Hardy, Roach teamed Todd with ZaSu Pitts for 17 shorts, from Let's Do Things (June 1931) through One Track Minds (May 1933). When Pitts left in 1933, she was replaced by Patsy Kelly, who appeared with Todd in 21 shorts, from Beauty and the Bus (September 1933) through An All-American Toothache (January 1936). These shorts often cast Todd as a levelheaded working girl doing her best to remain poised and charming despite numerous problems and her ditzy sidekick's embarrassing antics.

In 1931, Todd starred in Corsair, a film directed by Roland West, with whom she became romantically involved.

Todd became highly regarded as a capable film comedian, and Roach lent her to other studios to play opposite Wheeler & Woolsey, Buster Keaton, Joe E. Brown, and the Marx Brothers. She also successfully appeared in dramas, such as the original 1931 version of The Maltese Falcon starring Ricardo Cortez as Sam Spade, in which she played Miles Archer's treacherous widow. She appeared in around 120 feature films and shorts in her career.

Todd continued her short-subject series through 1935 and was featured in the full-length Laurel and Hardy comedy The Bohemian Girl. It was her last role before her untimely death at the age of 29. Although she had completed all of her scenes, producer Roach had them reshot, fearing negative publicity. He deleted all of Todd's dialogue and limited her appearance to one musical number.

=== Sidewalk Cafe ===
Originally built in 1928 by architect Mark Daniels as the Castellammare housing tract business block, in August 1934, Todd opened, in partnership with Roland West and his wife, actress Jewel Carmen, Thelma Todd's Sidewalk Cafe at 17575 Pacific Coast Highway, Castellammare, Pacific Palisades, Los Angeles. The ground floor of the building housed the restaurant. On the second floor, Todd and West lived in adjoining ocean-view apartments—with only a sliding wooden door separating their bedrooms— and held parties in the adjacent, private nightclub named Joya (for Jewel Carmen) that took up the rest of the second floor. The third floor, hexagonally shaped, had a dance floor and bandstand. It attracted a diverse clientele of Hollywood celebrities, and many tourists.

== Personal life ==
Todd was briefly married to Pat DiCicco, who supposedly had ties to the mob. The relationship was volatile and DiCicco was abusive to Todd, resulting in her filing for divorce and changing her will to leave him only $1.

== Death ==
On the morning of Monday, December 16, 1935, Todd's body was discovered inside her chocolate-colored 1934 Lincoln Phaeton convertible. Her Lincoln was parked inside the garage at the home of Jewel Carmen, wife of Roland West. Todd was wearing a mauve and silver gown, mink wrap, and expensive jewelry. Carmen's house was about a block from the topmost side of Todd's restaurant. Her death was determined to have been caused by carbon monoxide poisoning, though the garage door was raised roughly 3 to 4 inches. West is quoted in a contemporaneous newspaper account as having locked her out, which may have caused her to seek refuge and warmth in the car. Todd had a wide circle of friends and associates and a busy social life.

Police investigations revealed that she had spent the previous Saturday night (December 14) at the Trocadero, a popular Hollywood restaurant, at a party hosted by entertainer Stanley Lupino and his actress daughter Ida Lupino. She had a brief but unpleasant exchange there with her ex-husband, Pat DiCicco. However, her friends stated that she was in good spirits and were aware of nothing in her life that suggested a reason for her to commit suicide. She was driven home from the party in the early hours of December 15 by her chauffeur, Ernest O. Peters.

Los Angeles Police Department detectives concluded that Todd's death was accidental, the result of her either warming up the car to drive it or using the heater to keep herself warm, though that make of car did not have a heater in it. Todd also had a heart issue that caused her to normally send her maid to get the car because she could not make it up all those stairs to the garage. West had locked Todd out before and she would just break a window to gain entry. A coroner's inquest into the death was held on December 18, 1935. Autopsy surgeon A. P. Wagner testified that there were "no marks of violence anywhere upon or within the body" with only a "superficial contusion on the lower lip." There are informal accounts of greater signs of injury. The jury ruled that the death appeared accidental, but recommended "further investigation to be made into the case, by proper authorities."

A grand jury probe was subsequently held to determine whether Todd was murdered. After four weeks of testimony, the inquiry concluded with no evidence of foul play. The case was closed by the Homicide Bureau, which declared the death "accidental with possible suicide tendencies." However, investigators found no motive for suicide, and Todd left no suicide note.

Todd's memorial service, which drew large crowds to view the open casket, was held at Pierce Brothers Mortuary at 720 West Washington Blvd. in Los Angeles. The body was cremated. After her mother's death in 1969, Todd's remains were placed in her mother's casket and buried in Bellevue Cemetery in her hometown of Lawrence, Massachusetts.

== Legacy ==
For her contribution to the motion picture industry, Todd has a star on the Hollywood Walk of Fame at 6262 Hollywood Blvd.

== Selected filmography ==
Film
Year	Title	Role	Co-stars	Notes
1926	Fascinating Youth	Lorraine Lane	Charles "Buddy" Rogers	Lost film
1926	God Gave Me Twenty Cents	Dance-Hall Girl	Lois Moran; Lya De Putti	Uncredited; Lost film
1927	Rubber Heels	Princess Anne	Ed Wynn; Chester Conklin	Lost film
1927	Fireman, Save My Child		Wallace Beery	Uncredited
1927	Nevada	Hettie Ide	Gary Cooper; William Powell	
1927	The Gay Defender	Ruth Ainsworth	Richard Dix	Lost film
1927	The Shield of Honor	Rose aka Flora Fisher	Neil Hamilton; Dorothy Gulliver	
1928	The Noose	Phyllis	Richard Barthelmess	
1928	Abie's Irish Rose		Charles "Buddy" Rogers; Nancy Carroll	Part-talkie
1928	Vamping Venus	Madame Vanezlos the Dancer / Venus	Charles Murray; Louise Fazenda	Lost film
1928	Heart to Heart	Ruby Boyd	Mary Astor; Lloyd Hughes; Louise Fazenda	
1928	The Crash	Daisy McQueen	Milton Sills	
1928	The Haunted House	The Nurse	Larry Kent	Lost film
1928	Naughty Baby	Bonnie Le Vonne	Alice White; Jack Mulhall	
1929	Seven Footprints to Satan	Eve Martin	Creighton Hale	Produced as both a silent film and part-talkie
1929	Trial Marriage	Grace Logan	Norman Kerry Sally Eilers	
1929	House of Horror	Thelma	Louise Fazenda; Chester Conklin	Produced as both a silent film and part-talkie Lost film
1929	Unaccustomed As We Are	Mrs. Kennedy	Stan Laurel; Oliver Hardy; Edgar Kennedy; Mae Busch	Short
1929	The Bachelor Girl	Gladys	William Collier Jr. Jacqueline Logan	Lost film
1929	Careers	Hortense	Billie Dove; Antonio Moreno	
1929	Her Private Life	Mrs. Leslie	Billie Dove; Walter Pidgeon	First full length talkie
1930	Her Man	Nelly	Helen Twelvetrees; Phillips Holmes	
1930	Another Fine Mess	Lady Plumtree	Stan Laurel; Oliver Hardy	Short, Uncredited
1930	Follow Thru	Mrs. Van Horn	Charles "Buddy" Rogers; Nancy Carroll	
1931	No Limit	Betty Royce	Clara Bow; Norman Foster	
1931	Command Performance	Lydia	Neil Hamilton; Una Merkel	
1931	Chickens Come Home	Mrs. Hardy	Stan Laurel; Oliver Hardy	Short, Uncredited
1931	Swanee River	Caroline	Grant Withers	Lost film
1931	The Hot Heiress	Lola	Ben Lyon; Ona Munson; Walter Pidgeon	
1931	Aloha	Winifred Bradford	Ben Lyon; Raquel Torres	
1931	The Maltese Falcon	Iva Archer	Bebe Daniels; Ricardo Cortez; Dudley Digges; Una Merkel	Alternative title: Dangerous Female
1931	Broadminded	Gertie Gardner	Joe E. Brown; Ona Munson	
1931	The Pip from Pittsburg	Thelma	Charley Chase	Short
1931	Monkey Business	Lucille Briggs	Marx Brothers	
1931	Corsair	Alison Corning	Chester Morris	Credited as Alison Loyd
1931	On the Loose	Thelma	ZaSu Pitts	Short
1932	The Big Timer	Kay Mitchell	Ben Lyon; Constance Cummings	
1932	This Is the Night	Claire Mathewson	Lili Damita; Charles Ruggles; Roland Young	
1932	Horse Feathers	Connie Bailey	Marx Brothers	
1932	Speak Easily	Eleanor Espere	Buster Keaton; Jimmy Durante	
1932	Klondike	Klondike	Lyle Talbot	
1932	Deception	Lola Del Mont	Leo Carrillo; Nat Pendleton	
1932	Call Her Savage	Sunny De Lane	Clara Bow; Gilbert Roland	
1933	Air Hostess	Sylvia C. Carleton	Evalyn Knapp; James Murray	
1933	Cheating Blondes	Anne Merrick / Elaine Manners	Ralf Harolde	
1933	Fra Diavolo	Lady Pamela Rocburg	Stan Laurel; Oliver Hardy	Alternative titles: Bogus Bandits; The Devil's Brother
1933	Mary Stevens, M.D.	Lois Cavanaugh	Kay Francis; Lyle Talbot	
1933	You Made Me Love You	Pamela Berne	Stanley Lupino	
1933	Sitting Pretty	Gloria Duval	Jack Oakie; Jack Haley; Ginger Rogers	
1933	Son of a Sailor	The Baroness	Joe E. Brown; Jean Muir	
1933	Counsellor at Law	Lillian La Rue	John Barrymore; Bebe Daniels; Doris Kenyon	
1934	Palooka	Trixie	Jimmy Durante; Lupe Velez	Alternative titles: Joe Palooka; The Great Schnozzle
1934	Hips, Hips, Hooray!	Amelia Frisby	Bert Wheeler; Robert Woolsey; Dorothy Lee; Ruth Etting	
1934	The Poor Rich	Gwendolyn Fetherstone	Edward Everett Horton; Edna May Oliver	
1934	Bottoms Up	Judith Marlowe	Spencer Tracy; Pat Paterson	
1934	Cockeyed Cavaliers	Lady Genevieve	Bert Wheeler; Robert Woolsey; Dorothy Lee	
1934	Take the Stand	Sally Oxford	Jack LaRue; Gail Patrick	
1934	Lightning Strikes Twice	Judith 'Judy' Nelson	Ben Lyon	
1935	After the Dance	Mabel Kane	Nancy Carroll; George Murphy	
1935	Two for Tonight	Lilly	Bing Crosby; Joan Bennett	
1936	The Bohemian Girl	Gypsy queen's daughter	Stan Laurel; Oliver Hardy	

== See also ==
- Jewel Carmen § Death of Thelma Todd
- List of unsolved deaths
- Pitts and Todd
- Patsy Kelly
- White Hot: The Mysterious Murder of Thelma Todd, 1991 TV movie
