= Harold Norling Swanson =

American literat agent (1899–1991)

H. N. Swanson
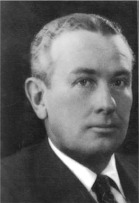
- H. N. Swanson
- Born: August 28, 1899; Centerville, Iowa, U.S.
- Died: May 31, 1991 (aged 91); Beverly Hills, California, U.S.
- Occupation: Literary agent
- Known for: representing William Faulkner Frank Buck and F. Scott Fitzgerald
- Spouse(s): Ruth Swanson (died 1971); Norma Swanson (died 2005)

Harold Norling Swanson (August 28, 1899 – May 31, 1991) was a literary agent who represented Frank Buck, F. Scott Fitzgerald and many other well-known American writers. He was a member of the Cliff Dwellers Club and was one of the founding members of the Tavern Club in Chicago.

== Career ==
Swanson graduated from Grinnell College, class of 1922. He began his career as a writer, but achieved more success as the editor, for eight years during the 1920s, of College Humor, a Chicago-based monthly magazine. In 1931, he moved to Hollywood, where he received a few minor story credits and then spent a period as an associate producer at RKO, with eight films to his credit, including two Wheeler and Woolsey comedies, Hips, Hips, Hooray! and Kentucky Kernels.

In 1934, Swanson opened his eponymous agency on Sunset Boulevard. He began representing adventurer-writer Frank Buck in 1935, soon after Buck's appearance in Fang and Claw, the documentary film based on his book of the same name. Swanson's efforts led to Buck's first appearance in a dramatic role, in the 15-chapter serial Jungle Menace, released by Columbia Pictures in 1937.

The Swanson Agency was unique at that time in its exclusive focus on the sale of motion picture (and later television and radio) rights to literary properties, as well as representation of the writers (including screenwriters) themselves. His dominance in this area is illustrated by the fact that by 1939 his client list reportedly included 80 of the 110 writers then working for Twentieth Century Fox. At one time or another, he represented F. Scott Fitzgerald, James M. Cain, William Faulkner, Ernest Haycox, Katharine Brush, Frank Gruber, Paul Gallico, Charles Bennett, MacKinlay Kantor, Kenneth Millar (Ross Macdonald), Pearl Buck, Raymond Chandler, Steve Fisher, Elmore Leonard, John O'Hara, Luke Short (Frederick Glidden), Joyce Carol Oates, Paul Theroux, Joseph Wambaugh, Philip Wylie and Cornell Woolrich. Among the many books he sold to the Hollywood studios were The Postman Always Rings Twice, The Big Sleep, Old Yeller, Butterfield 8 and The Mosquito Coast.

== Final years ==
Swanson published an autobiography, Sprinkled with Ruby Dust, in 1989. He worked in his agency until shortly before his death from a stroke. He is buried in Forest Lawn Memorial Park.
