= Wheeler & Woolsey =

American vaudeville comedy double act

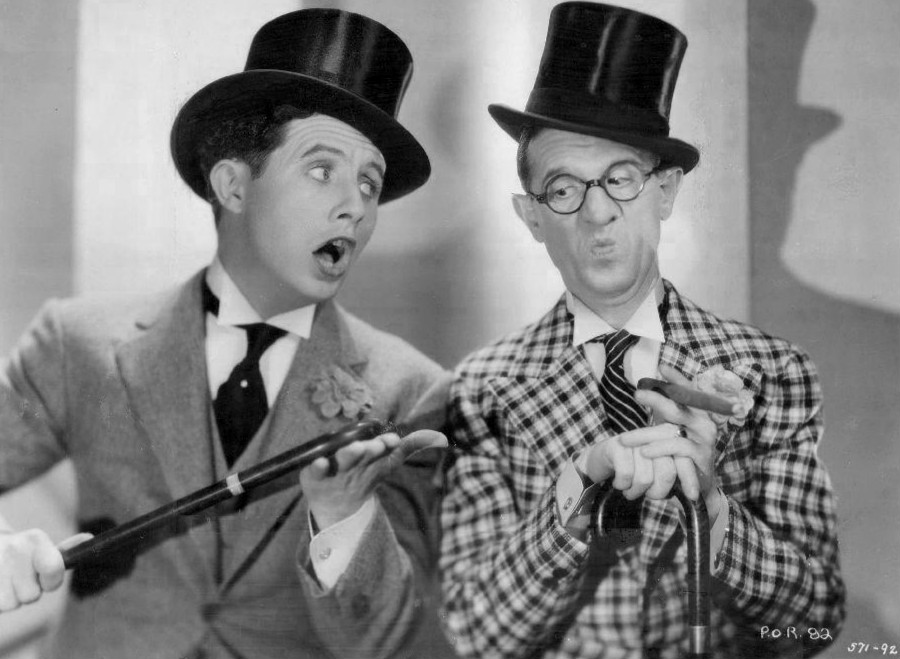
- Wheeler (left) and Woolsey (right) in Peach O'Reno (1931)

Comedy career
- Years active: 1927–1937
- Medium: Film
- Genres: Comedy, vaudeville
- Former members: Bert Wheeler; Robert Woolsey

Wheeler & Woolsey were an American vaudeville comedy duo who performed together in comedy films from the late 1920s. The team comprised Bert Wheeler (1895–1968) of New Jersey and Robert Woolsey (1888–1938) of Illinois.

== Collaboration ==
The Broadway theatre performers were initially teamed as the comedy relief for the 1927 Broadway musical Rio Rita, and came to Hollywood to reprise these roles for the film version. During production RKO signed Bert Wheeler to a movie contract, but not Robert Woolsey. It wasn't until the financial returns for Rio Rita came in that the studio signed both Woolsey and Dorothy Lee for further films alongside Wheeler.

Wheeler & Woolsey continued to make very popular comedy feature films from 1930 until 1937, all for RKO Radio Pictures—except the 1933 Columbia Pictures release So This Is Africa (which was made during a contract dispute with RKO).

Bert Wheeler and Dorothy Lee, in Half Shot at Sunrise (1930)

Curly-haired Bert Wheeler played an ever-smiling innocent, who was easily led and not very bright, but who would also sometimes display a stubborn streak of conscience. Bespectacled Robert Woolsey played a genially leering, cigar-smoking, fast-talking idea man who often got the pair in trouble. The vivacious Dorothy Lee usually played Wheeler's romantic interest.

The Wheeler & Woolsey movies are loaded with joke-book dialogue, original songs, puns, and sometimes racy double-entendre gags:

Woman (coyly indicating her legs): Were you looking at these?
Woolsey: Madam, I'm above that.

Woolsey (worried about a noblewoman): She's liable to have us beheaded.
Wheeler: Beheaded?! Can she do that?
Woolsey: Sure, she can be-head.

Vamp: Sing to me!
Wheeler: How about "One Hour with You"?
Vamp: Sure! But first, sing to me!

Such double-entendre gags were a hallmark of early Wheeler & Woolsey comedies, with RKO publicity and movie trailers trading openly on the titillating, sex-comedy aspects of each film. Wheeler occasionally appeared in drag, and chorus girls wore abbreviated costumes, adding to the "naughty" atmosphere. The racy content and advertising were severely curtailed after the enforcement of the Production Code in 1934.

Most of the Wheeler & Woolsey comedies include musical numbers, ranging from simple vocal duets to song-and-dance routines to elaborate pageants with a full chorus. All of these variations can be seen in the team's 1930 feature The Cuckoos, with a score by Bert Kalmar and Harry Ruby. Later films usually featured duets by Wheeler and Lee, comic songs by Wheeler and Woolsey, or comic songs by Woolsey opposite a featured actress. The very last scene Woolsey committed to film was a musical duet with Lupe Vélez, for the team's swan song, High Flyers (1937).

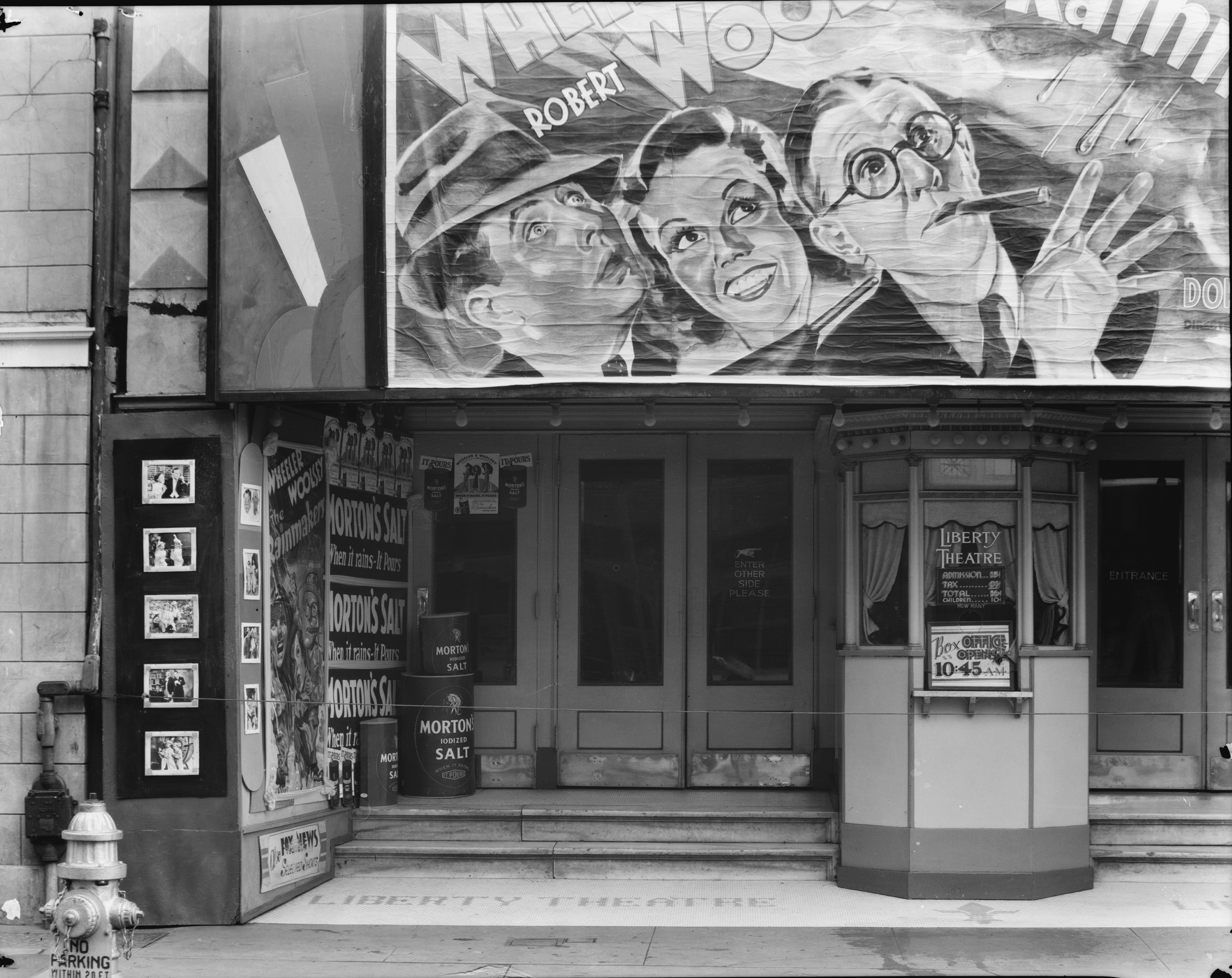
Wheeler & Woolsey's The Rainmakers showing at the Liberty Theater in New Orleans, 1935

By 1931 Wheeler & Woolsey were so popular that RKO attempted to generate twice the Wheeler & Woolsey income by making two solo pictures—one with Wheeler (Too Many Cooks) and one with Woolsey (Everything's Rosie). This experiment failed, and they returned to performing as a team. Among the team's features are The Cuckoos (1930, based on Clark and McCullough's Broadway show The Ramblers), Caught Plastered (1931), Peach O'Reno (1932), and Diplomaniacs (1933). Hips Hips Hooray and Cockeyed Cavaliers (both 1934) both co-starred Thelma Todd and Dorothy Lee, and both were directed by Mark Sandrich just before he was promoted to the Fred Astaire-Ginger Rogers musicals). Sandrich was replaced by George Stevens for The Nitwits (1935).

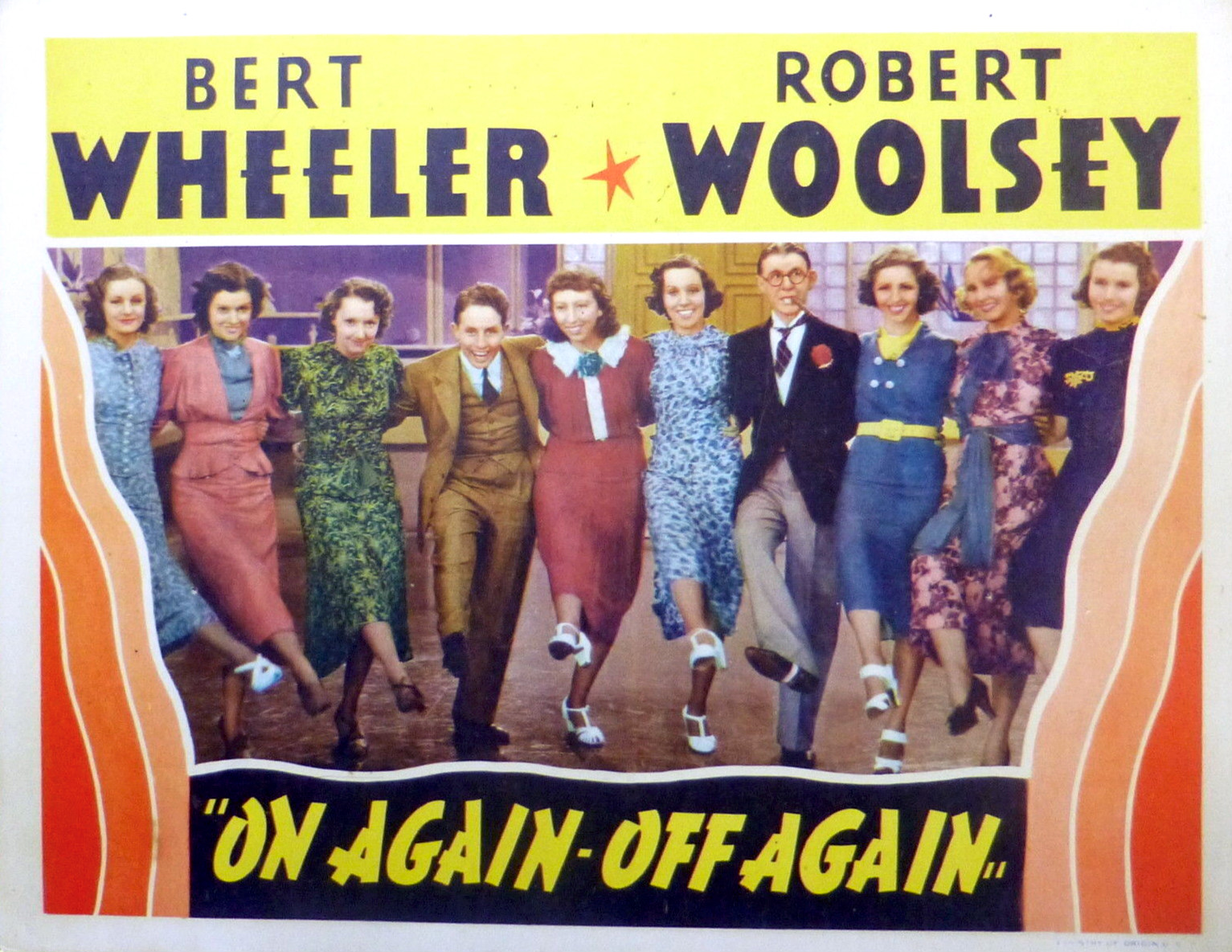
On Again-Off Again lobby card

After Stevens left the series, the team faltered due to awkward scripts and poor direction. In some of these later films Bert and Bob do not even appear as a team, but as strangers who encounter each other by chance. Woolsey's health deteriorated in 1936, and after struggling to complete High Flyers in 1937, he was no longer able to work; he died of kidney disease on October 31, 1938, ending the partnership.

== Surviving partner ==
After Woolsey died, RKO released Wheeler. Director Charles Reisner tried to keep Wheeler at the studio, hoping to team Wheeler with Dorothy Lee for a series of comedy features. RKO rejected the idea, on the grounds that audiences would also expect to see Woolsey on the screen.

Wheeler, struggling to restart his career, teamed with Dorothy Lee for a vaudeville tour in early 1938. He accepted solo roles in occasional films through 1941; his last feature film, Las Vegas Nights (1941) found him with a new partner, comedian and gag writer Hank Ladd. Wheeler then became a nightclub comic; in 1945 he headlined briefly with Jackie Gleason at Slapsy Maxie's, and would later appear on Gleason's Cavalcade of Stars TV program. His later appearances were mostly on television; his last theatrical films were two slapstick shorts for Columbia Pictures, filmed in 1950 and produced by Jules White.

Wheeler also starred in Harvey (replacing lead Frank Fay during the summer of 1946), and appeared with John Raitt and Anne Jeffreys in the Broadway musical Three Wishes for Jamie in 1952, In 1955 Wheeler co-starred with Keith Larsen in the CBS western series Brave Eagle.

Wheeler continued to work off and on through the 1960s in summer stock theaters, in nightclubs, and on television, either alone or with a partner, comedian-singer Tom Dillon.

== Filmography ==
Year	Title	Role	
Year	Title	Bert Wheeler	Robert Woolsey
1929	Rio Rita	Chick Bean	Ned Lovett
1930	The Cuckoos	Sparrow	Professor Cunningham
1930	Dixiana	Peewee	Ginger Dandy
1930	Half Shot at Sunrise	Tommy Turner	Gilbert Simpkins
1930	Hook, Line and Sinker	Wilbur Boswell	J. Addington Ganzy
1931	Cracked Nuts	Wendell Graham	Zander Ulysses Parkhurst
1931	The Stolen Jools (short)	Himself	Himself
1931	Caught Plastered	Tommy Tanner	Egbert G. Higginbotham
1931	Oh! Oh! Cleopatra (short)	Mark Antony	Julius Caesar
1931	Peach O'Reno	Wattles	Julius Swift
1932	Girl Crazy	Jimmy Deegan	Slick Foster
1932	Hold 'Em Jail	Curley Harris	Spider Robbins
1933	So This Is Africa	Wilbur	Alexander
1933	Diplomaniacs	Willy Nilly	Hercules Glub
1933	Signing 'Em Up (short)	Himself	Himself
1934	Hips, Hips, Hooray!	Andy Williams	Dr. Bob Dudley
1934	Cockeyed Cavaliers	Bert	Bob
1934	Kentucky Kernels	Willie	Elmer
1935	The Nitwits	Johnnie	Newton
1935	The Rainmakers	Billy	Roscoe Horne, the Rainmaker
1936	Silly Billies	Roy Banks	Prof. Philip "Painless" Pennington
1936	Mummy's Boys	Stanley Wright	Aloysius C. Whittaker
1937	On Again-Off Again	William Hobbs	Claude Augustus Horton
1937	High Flyers	Jeremiah "Jerry" Lane	Pierre Potkin

== Home media ==
Hook, Line and Sinker

Nine of the 21 movies the duo made together were released in a DVD collection titled "Wheeler & Woolsey: RKO Comedy Classics Collection" in March 2013 by Warner Archive. Rio Rita made its way to DVD in February 2006. Girl Crazy and Peach O'Reno were released as a two disc set in December 2010. Four additional W&W films were released individually through the Warner Archive in May 2012: The Rainmakers; Diplomaniacs; On Again-Off Again; and Kentucky Kernels (the latter receiving a Blu-Ray release on September 8, 2020).

Warner Archives released the "RKO Comedy Classics Collection Vol. 2" in October 2016. This includes six films: Too Many Cooks (Wheeler only); Everything's Rosie (Woolsey only); Dixiana; The Cuckoos; Cockeyed Cavaliers; and Silly Billies.

So This Is Africa has yet to be released on DVD.

Six Wheeler & Woolsey films have entered the public domain: the feature films Rio Rita, Dixiana, Half Shot at Sunrise, and Hook, Line and Sinker, and their appearances in two all-star short subjects, The Stolen Jools (1931) and Signing 'Em Up (1933). Dixiana was first made available on DVD in its complete version (including the Technicolor sequence) by the Roan Group (currently distributed through Troma) after Cary Roan was able to locate color elements. This release suffers from problematic framing.
