= So This Is Africa =

1933 film by Edward F. Cline

- Directed by: Edward F. Cline
- Written by: Lew Lipton; Norman Krasna
- Produced by: Harry Cohn (executive producer)
- Starring: Bert Wheeler; Robert Woolsey; Raquel Torres; Esther Muir
- Cinematography: Leonard Smith
- Edited by: Maurice Wright
- Music by: Bert Kalmar; Harry Ruby
- Distributed by: Columbia Pictures
- Release date: April 22, 1933
- Running time: 64 minutes
- Country: United States
- Language: English

So This Is Africa is a 1933 American Pre-Code comedy film directed by Edward F. Cline and starring Bert Wheeler, Robert Woolsey, Raquel Torres, and Esther Muir. It was Wheeler and Woolsey's only film for Columbia Pictures.

== Plot ==
Film studio "Ultimate Pictures" plans on producing an animal picture in Africa. The studio gets the help of animal specialist Mrs. Johnson Martini. There's just one problem: she's afraid of animals. Martini and the studio soon learn of Wilbur and Alexander, a couple of down on their luck vaudevillians with a trained lion act.

The duo agrees to join Martini on an expedition to Africa. While there, the trio meets a vine-swinging jungle girl named Tarzana (a female parody of Tarzan), who falls in love with Wilbur. Later, Tarzana's tribe of amorous Amazons arrives, captures the two men, and forces them to participate in an elaborate mating ritual ceremony (which includes a big-production song and dance number). In the end, an all-male tribe of Tarzan-lookalikes invades the village and takes the Amazon women as their brides.

== Cast ==
- Bert Wheeler as Wilbur
- Robert Woolsey as Alexander
- Raquel Torres as Tarzana
- Esther Muir as Mrs. Johnson Martini
- Berton Churchill as President of Ultimate Pictures
- Henry Armetta as Street Cleaner
- Spencer Charters as Doctor
- Spec O'Donnell as Johnny, Office Boy
- Jerome Storm as Production Manager

== Production ==
The Motion Picture Division of the Education Board of New York State felt that several lines of dialogue and other sequences in this film were inappropriate. As a result, Columbia Pictures was forced to delete sections of So This Is Africa prior to its release. Norman Krasna requested his name be taken off the credits accordingly.

The character of "Mrs. Johnson Martini" is a play on the real-life celebrity of the era Osa Johnson, generally referred to publicly at that time as Mrs. Martin Johnson. In collaboration with her husband, Johnson was a well-known documentary filmmaker. At the time So This Is Africa was issued, Johnson and her husband had just returned from a two-year stint in Africa and had released the documentary film Congorilla.

== Availability ==
To date, So This Is Africa has not been released into the home video market. It is currently owned by Sony Pictures Entertainment. The film has been shown on Turner Classic Movies in the past.
