= Corsair (film) =

1931 film directed by Roland West

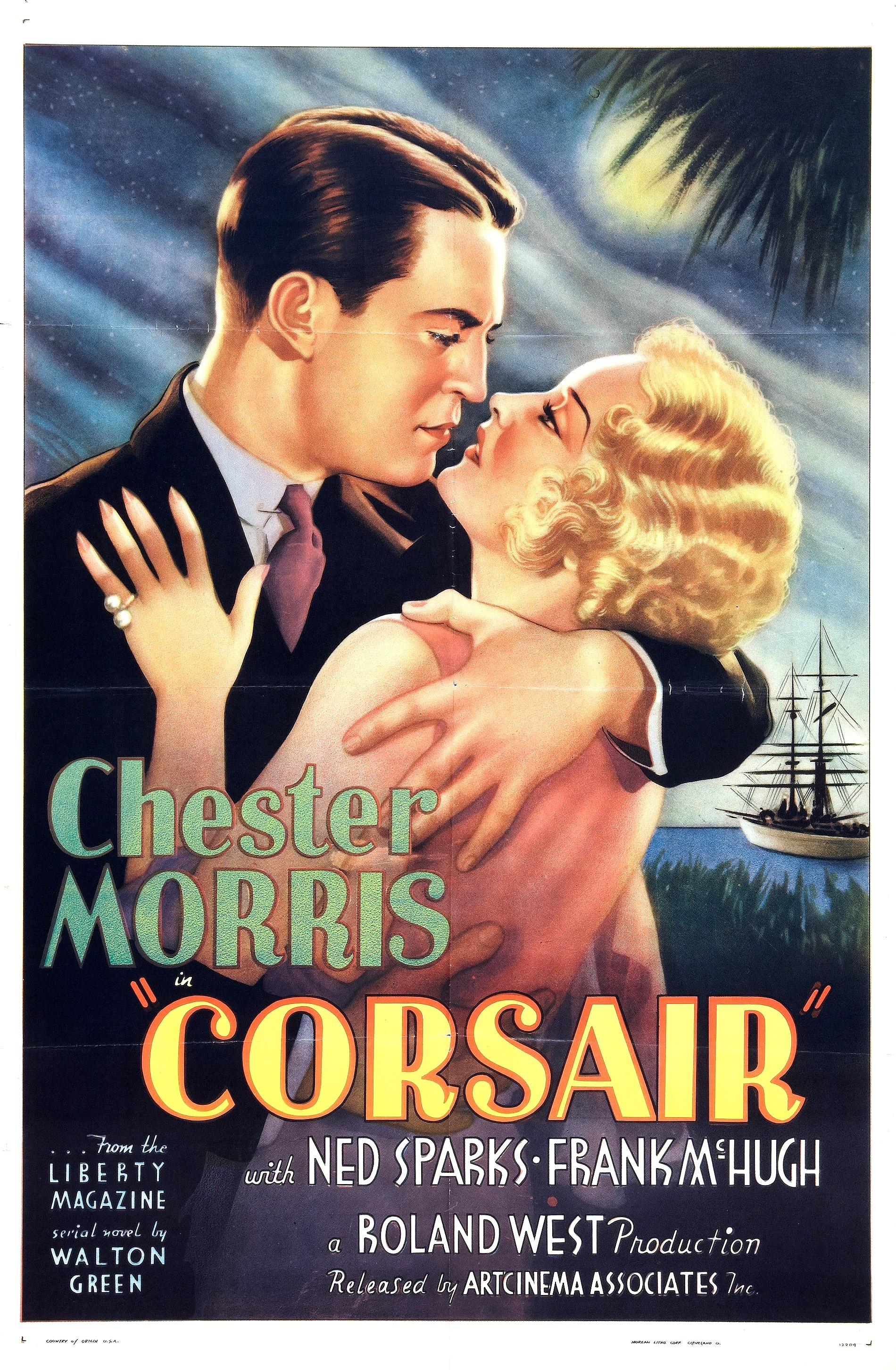
- Film poster
- Directed by: Roland West
- Screenplay by: Josephine Lovett; Roland West
- Based on: Walton Green's Corsair
- Produced by: Roland West
- Starring: Chester Morris; Alison Loyd
- Cinematography: Ray June
- Edited by: Hal C. Kern
- Music by: Alfred Newman
- Production company: Feature Productions
- Distributed by: United Artists
- Release date: November 28, 1931
- Running time: 75 minutes
- Country: United States
- Language: English

Corsair is a 1931 American pre-Code crime drama written, produced and directed by Roland West. The film is based on the 1931 novel Corsair, a Pirate in White Flannels by Walton Green and takes place in and was shot during the era of Prohibition in the United States. The film stars Chester Morris and Thelma Todd (credited as Alison Loyd).

== Plot ==
College football hero John Hawks lets himself be goaded by wealthy socialite Alison Corning into forgoing a job coaching the college team to be "a real man, and make real money" in the big city with her father, Stephen Corning, on Wall Street. He soon has more than he can stomach, making money by bilking the poor out of their meager savings with junk bonds. Mr. Corning tells John he doesn't have what it takes to succeed in the brutal world of share trading. John replies he will seek a new line of work where he will not go after elderly widows' savings.

John decides to go after those who deserve to lose their money: bootleggers. He gets inside information on Big John's rum-running operation from Slim through his gun moll, Sophie. Sophie taps out the information in Morse code with her typewriter to a confederate who informs John of alcohol shipments. Hawks is a modern pirate.

With his friend, 'Chub', he captains the Corsair, a gunboat, which preys on bootleggers and then resells the cargo to their wealthy backers. He only forgot two things: that in the cutthroat world of junk bonds and margin calls, they don't use real knives, machine guns, and bombs, like the gangsters; and the girl hiding in the hold.

== Cast ==
- Chester Morris as John Hawks
- Alison Loyd (Thelma Todd) as Alison Corning
- Fred Kohler as Big John
- Ned Sparks as Slim
- Emmett Corrigan as Stephen Corning
- William Austin as Richard Bentinck
- Frank McHugh as 'Chub' Hopping
- Frank Rice as Fish Face
- Mayo Methot as Sophie
- Gay Seabrook as Susie Grenoble
- Addie McPhail as Jean Phillips
