= Cracked Nuts (1931 film) =

1931 film

- Theatrical poster
- Directed by: Edward F. Cline; Fred Fleck (assistant)
- Written by: Al Boasberg; Ralph Spence
- Produced by: William LeBaron; Douglas MacLean (associate)
- Starring: Bert Wheeler; Robert Woolsey; Dorothy Lee
- Cinematography: Nicholas Musuraca
- Edited by: Arthur Roberts
- Music by: Max Steiner
- Distributed by: RKO Radio Pictures
- Release dates: April 4, 1931 (Premiere-New York City); April 19, 1931 (US)
- Running time: 65 minutes
- Country: United States
- Language: English
- Budget: $261,000
- Box office: $617,000

Cracked Nuts is a 1931 American pre-Code comedy film directed by Edward F. Cline, from an original screenplay written by Al Boasberg and Ralph Spence. The film stars the comedy duo Wheeler & Woolsey (Bert Wheeler and Robert Woolsey) as well as Dorothy Lee. It also features Boris Karloff in a small supporting role. The film was one of RKO's only financial successes of the year, with a profit of just over $150,000.

== Plot ==
Wendell Graham, while a millionaire through inheritance, is incredibly irresponsible. On a trans-Atlantic crossing, he meets the lovely Betty Harrington, and her stuffy, over-protective aunt, Minnie Van Varden. Wendell is definitely interested, and his interest is reciprocated by Betty; however, Aunt Minnie takes an instant dislike to the young man. On the same ship are several dissidents who are seeking financial support for their revolution back home in the fictional country of El Dorania. Wendell believes that if he offers them financial support in their revolutionary pursuits, this will enhance his position with Aunt Minnie, who owns a large estate in El Dorania and has been vocal about her displeasure with the current monarch. Wendell agrees to furnish the revolutionaries with $100,000 to further their cause.

Meanwhile, back in El Dorania, Zander Ulysses Parkhurst, better known by his acronym, Zup, is a casino owner. One night he believes he has hit the jackpot when he wins the crown of the country in a crap game with King Oscar, the owner of which becomes king of the country. Unbeknownst to Zup, Oscar has deliberately lost the crown, since he realizes that whoever becomes king is targeted for death. After he is crowned king, Zup learns from Queen Carlotta that a king's reign in El Dorania has averaged a single month over the past year, after which they are assassinated.

Wendell is told by the revolutionaries as they near El Dorania that after they overthrow the current monarch, they intend to make him their king. This sits well with Wendell, who feels that this will prove his worth to Aunt Minnie. When he arrives in the country, he realizes that the current monarch is his old friend from Brooklyn, Zup. Their celebratory reunion is short-lived when Wendell realizes that he needs to kill Zup in order to assume the throne. Wendell discovers that the assassinations are the brainchild of General Bogardus, who agrees to allow Zup to be killed in the modern fashion—with bombs dropped from airplanes.

Wendell arranges for all the bombs to be disarmed and lets Zup know there is nothing to fear. The day of assassination arrives during a national celebration, but Zup is unafraid since he knows that the bombs won't detonate. However, as the bombs begin to fall they explode, since they have been re-armed without Wendell's knowledge. The two friends flee for their lives, and as they do, fortune shines on them as one of the bombs lands over an oil deposit, which begins to gush forth. The country, now rich, is no longer interested in revolution. Zup remains king and Wendell gets to marry Betty, much to the chagrin of Aunt Minnie.

== Cast ==
- Bert Wheeler as Wendell Graham
- Robert Woolsey as Zander Ulysses Parkhurst ("Zup")
- Dorothy Lee as Betty Harrington
- Edna May Oliver as Aunt Minnie Van Varden
- Leni Stengel as Queen Carlotta
- Stanley Fields as General Bogardus
- Boris Karloff as Boris, First Revolutionary
- Frank Thornton as Revolutionist
- Harvey Clark as King Oscar
- Ben Turpin as Pilot

(Cast list as per AFI database)

== Reviews ==
Even though the film was successful at the box office, making a profit of $150,000, the film did not fare well with some critics of the time. The Motion Picture Herald said that the film, "... was, no doubt intended for a comedy but we missed the intent and went to sleep on it." Variety felt the film was far too long, which diluted the true comedic elements. Silver Screen rated the film, "Fair". Photoplay was a bit more kind, complaining that the comedy duo of Wheeler/Woolsey was being rushed into too many films, much to their detriment, but in spite of this, "... you'll laugh anyway, particularly in the later sequences where motion replaces gabble." Film Daily said the film "... was weak, the dialogue filled with unfunny puns, and Woolsey and Wheeler at a loss for new antics ...."

== Soundtrack ==
"Dance" (1931), music by Harry Tierney, lyrics by Ray Egan, sung and danced by Bert Wheeler and Dorothy Lee. The song was a last-minute addition to the film by producer William LeBaron. While already in the editing process, the song was added in March 1931.

== Notes ==
The original title of this film was Assorted Nuts, but was changed to Cracked Nuts in February 1931.

RKO was deciding on whether or not they could cast Woolsey and Wheeler separately in films. This film was a test, since over half the film is not of the duo, but of the two actors separately. Since the film did well, both actors were rewarded with their own solo projects later in 1931, Wheeler in Too Many Cooks, while Woolsey was in Everything's Rosie. But after that brief soiree, the two comedians were re-united for the remainder of their careers.

The director, Edward F. Cline, would direct another film with exactly the same name, Cracked Nuts, for Universal in 1941. It had absolutely no connection with this film other than the title and director.

This was the first talking film which used the concept of a revolution in a fictional kingdom, a concept which would be further developed two years later with the Marx Brothers' Duck Soup. Additionally, the song, "El Manicero" was used in both films (during the opening credits in this film, while Groucho Marx hums the tune during the later film).
