= Hold 'Em Jail =

1932 film

- Directed by: Norman Taurog
- Written by: Walter DeLeon (screenplay); S.J. Perelman (screenplay); Eddie Welch (screenplay); Mark Sandrich (screenplay); Tim Whelan (story); Lew Lipton (story); John P. Medbury (radio dialogue); Albert Ray (continuity)
- Produced by: Harry Joe Brown (associate producer); David O. Selznick (executive producer)
- Starring: Wheeler and Woolsey; Edna May Oliver; Edgar Kennedy; Betty Grable
- Cinematography: Leonard Smith
- Edited by: Arthur Roberts
- Music by: Max Steiner
- Distributed by: RKO Radio Pictures
- Release date: September 16, 1932
- Running time: 66 minutes
- Country: United States
- Language: English
- Budget: $408,000
- Box office: $511,000

Hold 'Em Jail is a 1932 American pre-Code comedy film starring Wheeler and Woolsey as a couple of inept characters who are wrongfully convicted of firearm possession. They are sent to prison, where they somehow end up playing on the warden's football team.

Warden Edgar Kennedy frames innocent people and blackmails them into playing on his football team in exchange for promises of eventual exoneration.

Wheeler and Woolsey are aware of the racket, but Kennedy treads lightly with them because his spinster sister (Oliver) is in love with one of them.

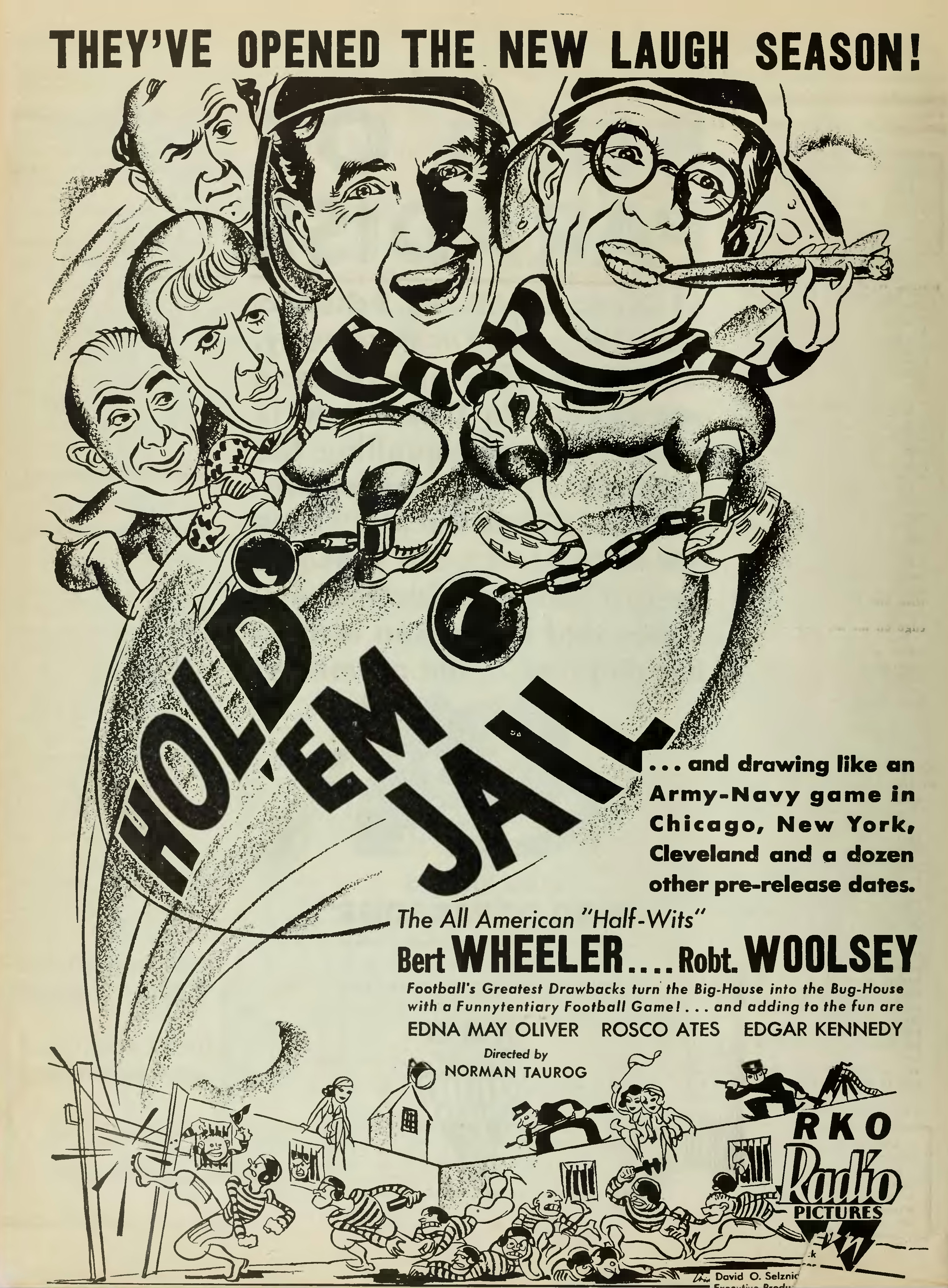
HOLD 'EM JAIL ad from The Film Daily, 1932

Unusually for the duo, the film is a straight comedy without musical numbers. It is also noteworthy for giving Betty Grable her first substantial role after appearances as a Goldwyn Girl and in bit parts. The title is a pun on the then-popular college football cheer, "Hold 'em, Yale."

== Cast ==
- Bert Wheeler as Curly Harris
- Robert Woolsey as Spider Robbins
- Edna May Oliver as Violet Jones
- Robert Armstrong as Radio Announcer
- Roscoe Ates as Sam
- Edgar Kennedy as Warden Elmer Jones
- Betty Grable as Barbara Jones
- Warren Hymer as Steele
- Paul Hurst as Butch
- G. Pat Collins as Whitey
- Stanley Blystone as Kravette
- Jed Prouty as Warden Charles Clark
- Spencer Charters as the Governor
- John Sheehan as Mike Maloney

== Box office ==
RKO records indicate that the film incurred a loss of $55,000.
