= Dorothy Lee (actress) =

American actress (1911–1999)

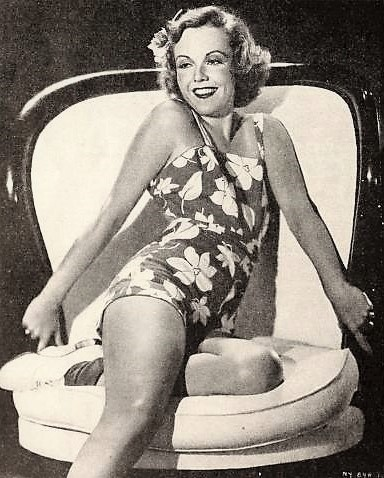
- Lee in 1935
- Born: Marjorie Elizabeth Millsap; May 23, 1911; Los Angeles, California, U.S.
- Died: June 24, 1999 (aged 88); San Diego, California, U.S.
- Years active: 1927–1941
- Spouse(s): Robert O. Boothe (m. 1927; div. 1929) Jimmie Fidler (m. 1930; div. 1932) Marshall D. Duffield (m. 1933; div. 1935) A. Gordon Atwater (m. 1936; div. 1939) F. John Bersbach, Jr. (m. 1941; div. 1960) Charles J. Calderini (m. 1960; died 1985)

Dorothy Lee (born Marjorie Elizabeth Millsap, May 23, 1911 – June 24, 1999) was an American actress and comedian during the 1930s. She appeared in 28 films, usually appearing alongside the comedy team of Bert Wheeler and Robert Woolsey.

== Biography ==
Born in Los Angeles, Marjorie Elizabeth Millsap was the daughter of Homer and Bess Millsap. Her father was an attorney in Los Angeles.

She became an actress known as Dorothy Lee. Her first film was Syncopation (1929).

Lee began her career as a dancer in a stage show, Ideas. When she happened to be watching scenes shot backstage for a film, the director asked her to take a small part in the film because the woman who was supposed to have the part did not show up. She later went to New York for a role in the stage show Hello Yourself. Her work in that production caught the attention of a movie director at RKO Radio Pictures, leading to her being in Syncopation, which was being filmed in New York.

At 18, she signed with RKO and began working with Wheeler & Woolsey; of W & W's 21 feature films, Lee is the leading lady in 13 of them. She became so identified with the comedians that she seldom appeared apart from them. She withdrew from the series after producer David O. Selznick tampered with her performance in Girl Crazy; she returned when Selznick's successor Mark Sandrich cast her in two well-received features in 1934, Hips, Hips, Hooray! and Cockeyed Cavaliers. During her temporary retirement RKO replaced her with Mary Carlisle and then Betty Grable, but Lee returned in 1935 for two appearances.

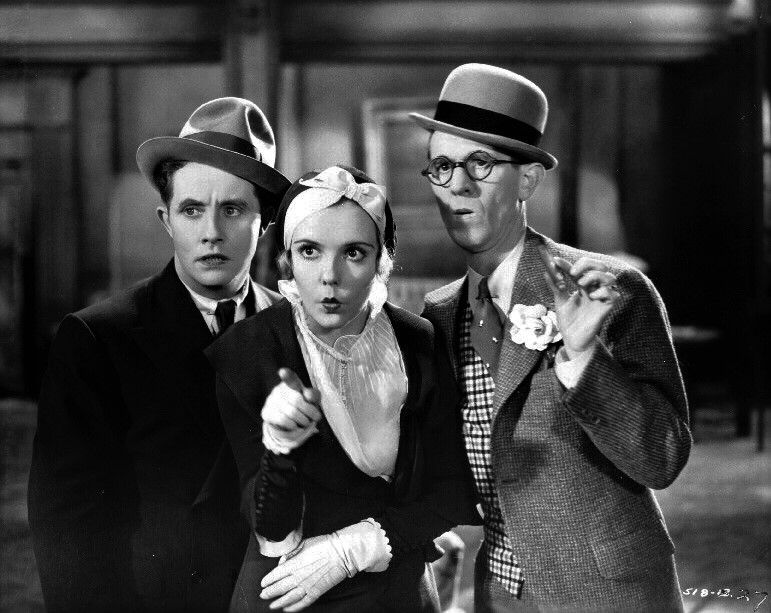
Lee with Wheeler & Woolsey in Hook, Line and Sinker (1930)

The Wheeler & Woolsey series ended when Robert Woolsey died in 1938. Dorothy Lee resumed her film career in 1939, playing incidental roles for RKO, Republic, Monogram, and Universal, retiring permanently from the screen in 1941. She continued to perform in person, in stage shows and at show-business functions.

== Personal life ==
Lee married six times into wealthy families, but the first five unions failed for essentially the same reason: whenever she got married, the husband would insist that she must give up show business and become a member of high society. Lee would make an attempt to please her husband, but the relationship ultimately failed when Lee kept accepting job offers. One such instance was in 1938, just after Robert Woolsey had died: Bert Wheeler was struggling to re-establish himself as a solo performer, and asked Dorothy Lee to tour with him in vaudeville. She immediately interrupted her private life to help her friend, over her husband's objections.

Her marriages:

- Robert O. Boothe (1927–1929; dissolved) Lee married Pasadena society scion Boothe when she was 16. "My parents didn't approve of meeting involved in a serious relationship at a young age. Definitely not. But eventually my mother told me, 'The two of you are always together, so you might as well get married.' And that's what we did." The marriage failed when she joined the cast of a collegiate musical, Hello Yourself, and entered into a whirlwind romance with the show's orchestra leader Fred Waring. Despite frequent arguments about marriage and career, they were drawn to each other and Waring persisted in proposing marriage. She told Boothe about it, and husband and wife parted friends. She treasured Waring's engagement ring and wore it for the rest of her life, but she and Waring never married. She confessed that Waring was the love of her life.
- Jimmie Fidler, Hollywood gossip columnist and broadcaster (1930–1932; divorced). She married Fidler in San Bernardino, California. Lee's biographers explained, "They lived different lifestyles and he wanted her to cut back on her film assignments." Lee herself remarked, "I stupidly married Fidler on the rebound from Fred. We simply didn't get along and it didn't help that I was so obviously in love with Fred."
- Marshall D. Duffield, college football star (1933–1935; divorced). Lee married Duffield in Agua Caliente.
- A. Gordon Atwater, vice president of the Wrigley chewing-gum company (1936–1939; divorced). Lee met Atwater while on a publicity junket to Catalina Island and he proposed marriage that very night. She divorced Duffield and married Atwater on March 7, 1936, in Crown Point, Indiana. The increasingly private "A. G." was annoyed by his wife's continued interest in performing, and Lee was tired of her obligations as a society figure. In Lee's words, "It's a shame that A. G. turned into a recluse and no longer wanted to see anyone. He was so full of life. We stayed in touch for years [and] I eventually got to know all of A. G.'s wives."
- F. John Bersbach, Jr., Chicago socialite and printing/engraving executive (1941–1960; divorced). They were married on December 10, 1941, in Winnetka, Illinois. Her marriage to Bersbach lasted longer than the others—almost two decades—but it became strained when they no longer had the same interests.
- Charles J. Calderini, senior partner in a Chicago law firm (1960–1985; his death). This was Lee's longest and happiest marriage: "I'm finally at a point in my life where I think I've got this marriage thing figured out." They were wed on August 9, 1960 and remained together until his death on August 16, 1985.

== Death ==
Lee died on June 24, 1999, aged 88, in San Diego, California, from respiratory failure, and is buried in Prospect Hill Cemetery, Rice, Jo Daviess County, Illinois.

== Partial filmography ==
Note that a completely different actress named "Dorothy Lee" appeared in several silent film in 1924 and 1925, and is sometimes confused with this Dorothy Lee, who made her film debut in 1929.

With Wheeler & Woolsey:

- Rio Rita (1929)
- The Cuckoos (1930)
- Dixiana (1930)
- Half Shot at Sunrise (1930)
- Hook, Line and Sinker (1930)
- Cracked Nuts (1931)
- Caught Plastered (1931)
- Peach-O-Reno (1931)
- Girl Crazy (1932)
- Hips, Hips, Hooray! (1934)
- Cockeyed Cavaliers (1934)
- The Rainmakers (1935)
- Silly Billies (1936)

Solo performances:

- Syncopation (1929)
- Local Boy Makes Good (1931)
- Too Many Cooks (1931, with Bert Wheeler)
- Laugh and Get Rich (1931)
- The Stolen Jools (1931, cameo appearance in short subject)
- Plane Crazy (1933)
- Maizie (1933)
- A Preferred List (1933, lead in short subject)
- School for Girls (1934)
- The Curtain Falls (1934)
- If This Isn't Love (1934, lead in short subject)
- In the Spotlight (1935, lead in short subject)
- Without Children (1935)
- S.O.S. Tidal Wave (1939)
- Laddie (1940)
- Too Many Blondes (1941)
