= Caught Plastered =

1931 film directed by William A. Seiter

- Directed by: William Seiter
- Written by: Douglas MacLean; Ralph Spence (adaptation and dialogue); Eddie Walsh (additional dialogue); Jane Murfin (uncredited)
- Produced by: William LeBaron; Douglas MacLean (associate producer)
- Starring: Bert Wheeler; Robert Woolsey; Dorothy Lee; Lucy Beaumont; Jason Robards
- Cinematography: Jack MacKenzie
- Edited by: Jack Kitchin
- Music by: Victor Schertzinger
- Distributed by: RKO Radio Pictures
- Release date: September 5, 1931
- Running time: 68 minutes
- Country: United States
- Language: English
- Budget: $281,000
- Box office: $549,000

Caught Plastered is a 1931 American Pre-Code musical comedy film, released by RKO Radio Pictures and starring the comedy team Wheeler & Woolsey.

== Plot ==
Tommy Tanner and Egbert G. Higginbotham are two vaudevillians who were kicked out of the last town they performed in. After fleeing to the town of Lockville, the duo befriend elderly widow Mother Talley. Mother is upset because she is unable to get customers into her drug store. In addition, Mother owes a payment on a bank note to Harry Watters. Tommy and Egbert decide to turn Mother's drugstore into a money-making venture, even producing their own afternoon radio program right in the store. Harry, who wants to buy the store as part of a bootlegging operation, attempts to sell the duo an alcohol-laced drink, referring to it as "lemon-syrup". The "syrup" gains praise from everybody in town, until the police show up to close down the operation. Tommy and Egbert are suspicious of Harry, and it is up to them to find Harry, clear their name, and save Mother's store.

== Cast ==
- Bert Wheeler as Tommy Tanner
- Robert Woolsey as Egbert G. Higginbotham
- Dorothy Lee as Peggy Morton
- Lucy Beaumont as Mother Talley
- Jason Robards as Harry Watters
- Charles B. Middleton as Sheriff Flint
- DeWitt Jennings as Police Chief H.A. Morton
- Josephine Whittell as Miss Newton
- Jim Farley as Clancy, a policeman
- Nora Cecil as Miss Loring (uncredited)
- Tom Herbert as Streetcar conductor (uncredited)
- Arthur Housman as First Drunk Customer (uncredited)
- Lee Moran as Second Drunk Customer (uncredited)
- William Scott as Clark (uncredited)

== Reception ==
According to RKO the film made a profit of $90,000.
