= Peach O'Reno =

- Directed by: William A. Seiter
- Written by: Tim Whelan; Ralph Spence (adaptation and dialogue); Eddie Welch (adaptation and dialogue)
- Produced by: William LeBaron; John E. Burch (supervisor)
- Starring: Bert Wheeler; Robert Woolsey; Dorothy Lee; Zelma O'Neal; Joseph Cawthorn; Cora Witherspoon
- Cinematography: Jack MacKenzie
- Edited by: Jack Kitchin
- Music by: Harry Akst (composer); Grant Clarke (composer); Richard A. Whiting (composer); Ray Heindorf (orchestrator); Max Steiner (musical director)
- Distributed by: RKO Radio Pictures
- Release date: December 25, 1931 (US)
- Running time: 63 minutes
- Country: United States
- Language: English
- Budget: $293,000
- Box office: $570,000

Peach O'Reno is a 1931 pre-Code comedy film starring Bert Wheeler, Robert Woolsey, Dorothy Lee, and Zelma O'Neal. It was released on Christmas Day of 1931. The title is a pun on peacherino, a then-popular slang term for something more desirable or intense than just a simple peach, itself a complimentary term.

A copy is preserved in the Library of Congress collection.

== Plot ==
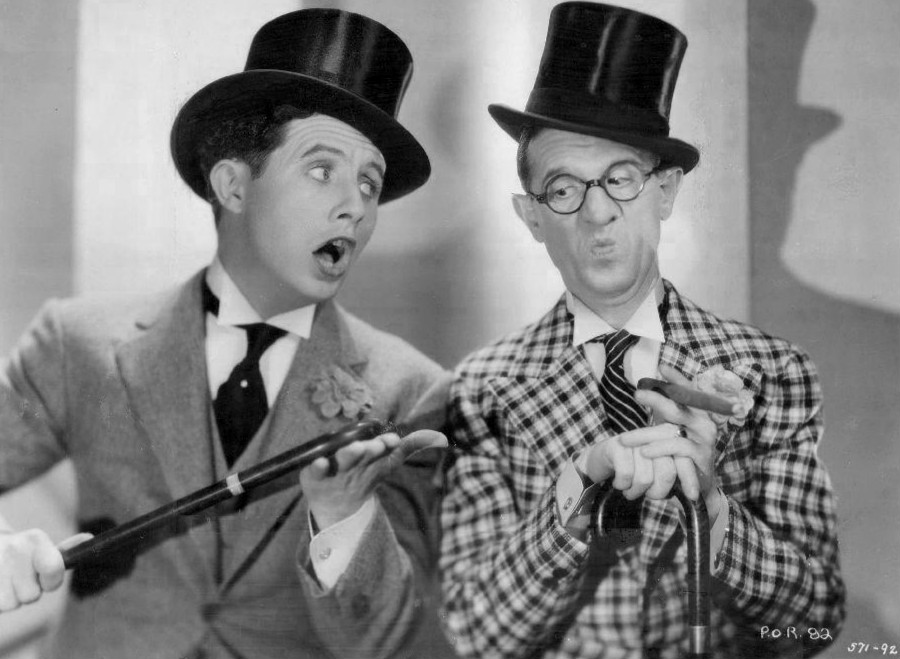
Bert Wheeler and Robert Woolsey in a scene from the film.

Aggie Bruno has had enough of her husband, Joe, and decides to get a divorce in Reno. She meets with lawyers Wattles and Swift, the latter of the two agreeing to represent Aggie in court. Swift suggests that Aggie be "caught" with another man. Meanwhile, Joe Bruno has also headed to Reno, and is being represented in court by Wattles. Wattles suggests that Joe be "caught" with another woman.

Meanwhile, Ace Crosby, an angry Arizona gambler, wants to shoot Wattles for representing his wife in a previous divorce case. Swift suggests that Wattles dress as a woman in order to avoid being found by the gambler. That evening, Wattles and Swift do the same thing that they do every evening: turn their office into a casino. Swift arrives at the casino pretending to be Aggie Bruno's love interest. To add to the confusion, Wattles (dressed as a woman) shows up with Joe Bruno, pretending to be his love interest.

== Cast ==
- Bert Wheeler as Wattles
- Robert Woolsey as Julius Swift
- Dorothy Lee as Prudence Bruno
- Zelma O'Neal as Pansy Bruno
- Joseph Cawthorn as Joe Bruno
- Cora Witherspoon as Aggie Bruno
- Sam Hardy as Judge Jackson
- Mitchell Harris as Ace Crosby, the Gambler
- Arthur Hoyt as Secretary
- Josephine Whittell as Mrs. Doubleday-Doubleday
- Harry Holman as Counselor Jackson #2 (uncredited)
- Frank Darien as Counselor Jackson #3
- Eddie Kane as Radio Announcer in Courtroom (uncredited)
- Monte Collins as Courtroom Vendor (uncredited)

(cast as per AFI database

== Production ==
A rather notorious scene involving a wrestling match between Julis Swift (Robert Woolsey) and Pansy Bruno (Zelma O'Neal) was cut from the film.

== Reception ==
According to RKO records, the film made a profit of $90,000.

== Home media ==
Peach O'Reno was released with Girl Crazy on DVD by Warner Brothers on December 17, 2010.
