= Lightning Strikes Twice (1934 film) =

1934 film directed by Ben Holmes

- Directed by: Ben Holmes
- Screenplay by: Joseph A. Fields; John Grey
- Story by: Marion Dix; Ben Holmes
- Produced by: Lee Marcus
- Starring: Ben Lyon; Thelma Todd; Pert Kelton
- Cinematography: Edward J. Cronjager
- Edited by: Arthur Roberts
- Music by: Roy Webb
- Production company: RKO Radio Pictures
- Distributed by: RKO Radio Pictures
- Release date: December 7, 1934 (US)
- Running time: 66 minutes
- Country: United States
- Language: English

Lightning Strikes Twice is a 1934 American comedy film directed by Ben Holmes from a screenplay by Joseph A. Fields and John Grey. It stars Ben Lyon, Thelma Todd, and Pert Kelton. A print is held by the Library of Congress.

== Cast ==
- Ben Lyon as Steven 'Steve' Brewster
- Thelma Todd as Judith 'Judy' Nelson
- Pert Kelton as Fay, the Fan Dancer
- Laura Hope Crews as Aunt Jane Madison
- Richard 'Skeets' Gallagher as Wally Richards (as 'Skeets' Gallagher)
- Chick Chandler as Marty Hicks
- Walter Catlett as Gus
- Jonathan Hale as Capt. Hobart Nelson (as John Hale)
- Margaret Armstrong as Martha, the Housekeeper
- John Davidson as Phillips, the Butler
- Fred Kelsey as Detective Dugan
- Edgar Dearing as Police Lt. Foster
- Roger Gray as Officer Casey
