= The Cowboy Quarterback =

1939 film by Noel M. Smith

- Theatrical release poster
- Directed by: Noel M. Smith
- Screenplay by: Fred Niblo, Jr.
- Produced by: Bryan Foy
- Starring: Bert Wheeler; Marie Wilson; Gloria Dickson; William Demarest; Eddie Foy, Jr. William Hopper
- Cinematography: Ted D. McCord
- Edited by: Doug Gould
- Music by: Howard Jackson
- Production company: Warner Bros. Pictures
- Distributed by: Warner Bros. Pictures
- Release date: July 29, 1939
- Running time: 56 minutes
- Country: United States
- Language: English

The Cowboy Quarterback is a 1939 American comedy film directed by Noel M. Smith and written by Fred Niblo, Jr. The film stars Bert Wheeler, Marie Wilson, Gloria Dickson, William Demarest, Eddie Foy, Jr. and William Hopper. The film was released by Warner Bros. Pictures on July 29, 1939.

== Plot ==
Rusty Walker, a scout for the Chicago Packers professional football team, discovers a young fellow named Harry Lynn in remote Montana who has amazing prowess as a quarterback. He persuades Harry to come to Chicago, but because Harry is afraid to leave girlfriend Maizie alone with rival suitor "Handsome Sam" Saxon, he insists that Maizie be permitted to come along.

Harry's play is as good as Rusty expects it to be, but Maizie is a constant distraction. When she leaves town, team management fixes up Harry with the attractive Evelyn Corey and, sure enough, he falls in love. Harry writes a letter to Maizie, breaking off their engagement, then has second thoughts, but teammate Steve mails it without Harry's knowledge.

Getting drunk, Harry loses $5,000 gambling while unaware he was betting real money. Crooks instruct him to throw the Packers' big game against the Ramblers, and things get further complicated when Harry learns that Evelyn actually intends to marry Rusty, not him. Maizie returns with Handsome Sam, and after leading the team to victory in the final seconds, Harry manages to intercept Handsome Sam as he is about to hand Maizie the unopened letter.

== Cast ==
- Bert Wheeler as Harry Lynn
- Marie Wilson as Maizie Williams
- Gloria Dickson as Evelyn Corey
- William Demarest as Rusty Walker
- Eddie Foy, Jr. as Steve Adams
- William Hopper as Handsome Sam Saxon
- William Gould as Colonel Moffett
- Charles C. Wilson as Coach Hap Farrell
- Frederic Tozere as Mr. Slater
- John Harron as Mr. Gray
- John Ridgely as Mr. Walters
- Eddie Acuff as Airplane Pilot
- Clem Bevans as Lem
