= Cockeyed Cavaliers =

1934 American comedy film directed by Mark Sandrich

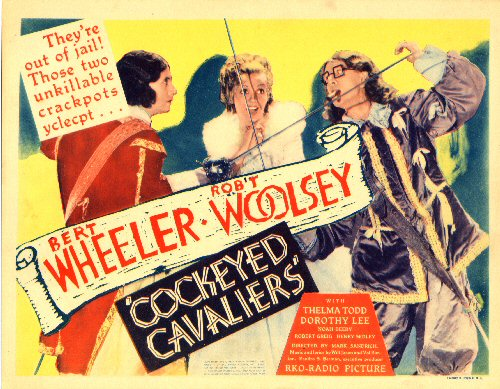
- Lobby card for the film
- Directed by: Mark Sandrich
- Written by: Edward Kaufman; Grant Garrett; Ralph Spence; Ben Holmes
- Produced by: Pandro S. Berman; Lou Brock (associate)
- Starring: Bert Wheeler; Robert Woolsey; Thelma Todd; Dorothy Lee
- Cinematography: David Abel
- Edited by: Jack Kitchin
- Music by: Roy Webb
- Production company: RKO Radio Pictures
- Release date: June 29, 1934 (US)
- Running time: 72 minutes
- Country: United States
- Language: English

Cockeyed Cavaliers is a 1934 American pre-Code comedy film starring the comedy duo of Wheeler & Woolsey. Directed by Mark Sandrich from a screenplay by Edward Kaufman, Grant Garrett, Ralph Spence and Ben Holmes. Also featured in the cast were Dorothy Lee and Thelma Todd.

== Plot ==
In medieval England, Bert and his friend, Bob are put into the stocks after Bert is caught stealing. A local young boy helps them escape. Bert, Bob and the young boy are chased by jailers through the countryside. It becomes apparent that the young boy is actually a young woman named Mary Ann. Mary Ann is attempting her own escape, from an arranged marriage to the Duke. Mary Ann reveals herself after they arrive at the Duke's castle. Bert falls in love with her.

Mary Ann agrees to the wedding after Mary Ann's father is threatened by the Duke to get his daughter to marry him. Bob, meanwhile, has fallen for the wife of the Baron. The Baron is enraged when he learns of his wife's infidelity. His vengeance is postponed when a local boar is spotted and the hunt is on. Bert and Bob capture the animal and win the bounty, letting Bert save Mary Ann from her ill-fated marriage.

== Cast ==
- Bert Wheeler as Bert
- Robert Woolsey as Bob
- Thelma Todd as Lady Genevieve
- Dorothy Lee as Mary Ann
- Noah Beery as The baron
- Robert Greig as The Duke [of Weskit
- Henry Sedley as The Baron's friend
- Billy Gilbert as Innkeeper
- Franklin Pangborn as Town crier
- Alfred P. James as Mary Ann's father
- Jack Norton as King's physician
- Snub Pollard as King's physician

(cast list as per AFI database)

== Production ==
In February 1934 it was announced that Bert Wheeler and Robert Woolsey would appear in Cockeyed Cavaliers as their next film. At the same time it was announced that Mark Sandrich would direct, and Dorothy Lee and Thelma Todd would appear as the female leads. Edward Kaufman, Grant Garrett, and Ben Holmes were given the writing assignment. The film was scheduled to be begin production before March 20, with reports of its scheduled start within a week of March 7, and was slated to be finished in late April. In the first week of April, Henry Sedley and Kewpie Morgan were added to the cast. Less than a week later it was announced that Noah Beery and Franklin Pangborn were joining the cast. In late April Snub Pollard and Jack Norton were announced as being added to the production. For the scene of the boar hunt, Lou Brock had a wild boar brought into the sound stage, from nearby Catalina Island. Under the watch of an armed marksman, Wheeler and Woolsey confronted the animal with fake spears. The film contained two songs by Will Jason and Val Burton, "Big Bad Wolf Was Dead" and "Dilly Dally". In mid-May it was announced that the picture would be released on June 22, but by early June the release date had been pushed back to June 29. The film opened on its new release date of June 29.

== Reception ==
Modern Screen gave the film a "B", calling it the best film done up to that point by Wheeler and Woolsey, saying the pair was "hilariously funny". Previewing the film, Motion Picture Daily gave the film a good review, although they did not like it as much as two of Wheeler and Woolsey's earlier films. They applauded Sandrich's direction, and were especially impressed with the work of Lou Brock as producer. They also felt that the two songs, "The Big Bad Wolf Was Dead" and "Dilly Dally" were sure to be hits. The Motion Picture Herald also gave the film a positive review, saying that it lived up to the standards that the fans of Wheeler and Woolsey had come to expect. The film was one of 41 selected for President Franklin D. Roosevelt to take along with him on a vacation cruise through the Caribbean in July 1934.
