= Silly Billies =

1936 American film directed by Fred Guiol

- Directed by: Fred Guiol
- Screenplay by: Al Boasberg; Jack Townley
- Story by: Thomas Lennon; Fred Guiol
- Produced by: Lee Marcus
- Starring: Bert Wheeler; Robert Woolsey; Dorothy Lee
- Cinematography: Nick Musuraca; J. Roy Hunt
- Edited by: John Lockert
- Music by: Roy Webb
- Production company: RKO Radio Pictures
- Distributed by: RKO Radio Pictures
- Release date: March 20, 1936
- Running time: 65 minutes
- Country: United States
- Language: English

Silly Billies is a 1936 American comedy film directed by Fred Guiol from a screenplay by Al Boasberg and Jack Townley, based on a story by Guiol and Thomas Lennon. The film was the twentieth feature for the comedy duo of Wheeler and Woolsey (Bert Wheeler and Robert Woolsey), and also stars Dorothy Lee, who had been in a number of their films. It was released by RKO Radio Pictures on March 20, 1936.

== Plot ==
In 1851, dentists Roy Banks and Philip "Painless" Pennington attempt to save a town from being led into an Indian ambush.

== Cast ==
- Bert Wheeler as Roy Banks
- Robert Woolsey as Dr. Philip "Painless" Pennington
- Dorothy Lee as Mary Blake
- Harry Woods as Hank Bewley
- Ethan Laidlaw as Trigger
- Chief Thunderbird as Chief Cyclone
- Delmar Watson as Martin
- Richard Alexander as John Little
- Willie Best as Excitement
- Jerry Tucker as Boy at Camp (uncredited)
