= Hook, Line and Sinker (1930 film) =

1930 film

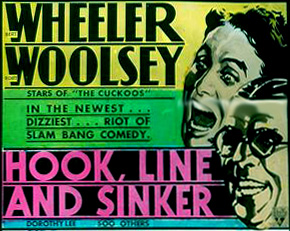
- Lantern slide
- Directed by: Edward F. Cline; Frederick Fleck (assistant)
- Written by: Ralph Spence; Tim Whelan
- Produced by: William LeBaron; Myles Connolly (assoc.)
- Starring: Bert Wheeler; Robert Woolsey; Dorothy Lee
- Cinematography: Nicholas Musuraca
- Edited by: Archie Marshek
- Production company: RKO Radio Pictures
- Distributed by: RKO Radio Pictures
- Release date: December 23, 1930 (New York City)
- Running time: 72 minutes
- Country: United States
- Language: English
- Budget: $287,000
- Box office: $780,000

Hook, Line and Sinker (1930)

Hook, Line and Sinker is a 1930 American pre-Code slapstick comedy directed by Edward F. Cline from a screenplay by Ralph Spence and Tim Whelan. It was the third starring vehicle for the comedy team of Wheeler & Woolsey (Bert Wheeler and Robert Woolsey), and also featured Dorothy Lee. It would be one of the largest financial successes for RKO Pictures in 1930.

== Plot ==
Two fast-talking insurance salesmen — Wilbur Boswell and J. Addington Ganzy — help penniless socialite Mary Marsh to turn a dilapidated hotel, which was willed to her, into a thriving success. They soon run into trouble, however, in the form of two sets of rival gangsters who want to break into the hotel safe; also, Mary's mother, Rebecca Marsh, wants her to marry wealthy lawyer John Blackwell, although Mary has fallen in love with Wilbur. And while she takes an instant dislike to Wilbur, Rebecca falls for Ganzy. Adding to the complications is the fact that Blackwell is actually in league with the gangsters. The finale involves nighttime runarounds and a shoot-out in the hotel. During the pitched battle between the rival gangs and the police, Boswell and Ganzy save the jewels, after which Ganzy marries Rebecca, and then gives away Mary at her marriage to Wilbur.

== Cast ==
- Bert Wheeler as Wilbur Boswell
- Robert Woolsey as Addington Ganzy
- Dorothy Lee as Mary Marsh
- Jobyna Howland as Rebecca Marsh
- Ralf Harolde as John Blackwell (Buffalo Blackie)
- William B. Davidson as Frank Dukette (Duke of Winchester)
- Natalie Moorhead as Duchess Bessie Von Essie
- George F. Marion as Ritz De La Rivera Bellboy
- Hugh Herbert as Hotel House Detective
- Stanley Fields as McKay

(Cast list as per AFI database)

== Release ==
The film opened at the Mayfair Theatre in New York City on December 23, 1930.

== Reception ==
The film made a profit of $225,000, and would be one of the top two money earners for RKO Radio Pictures in 1930.

== Notes ==
In 1958, the film entered the public domain in the United States because the claimants did not renew its copyright registration in the 28th year after publication.
