= On Again-Off Again =

1937 film by Edward Cline

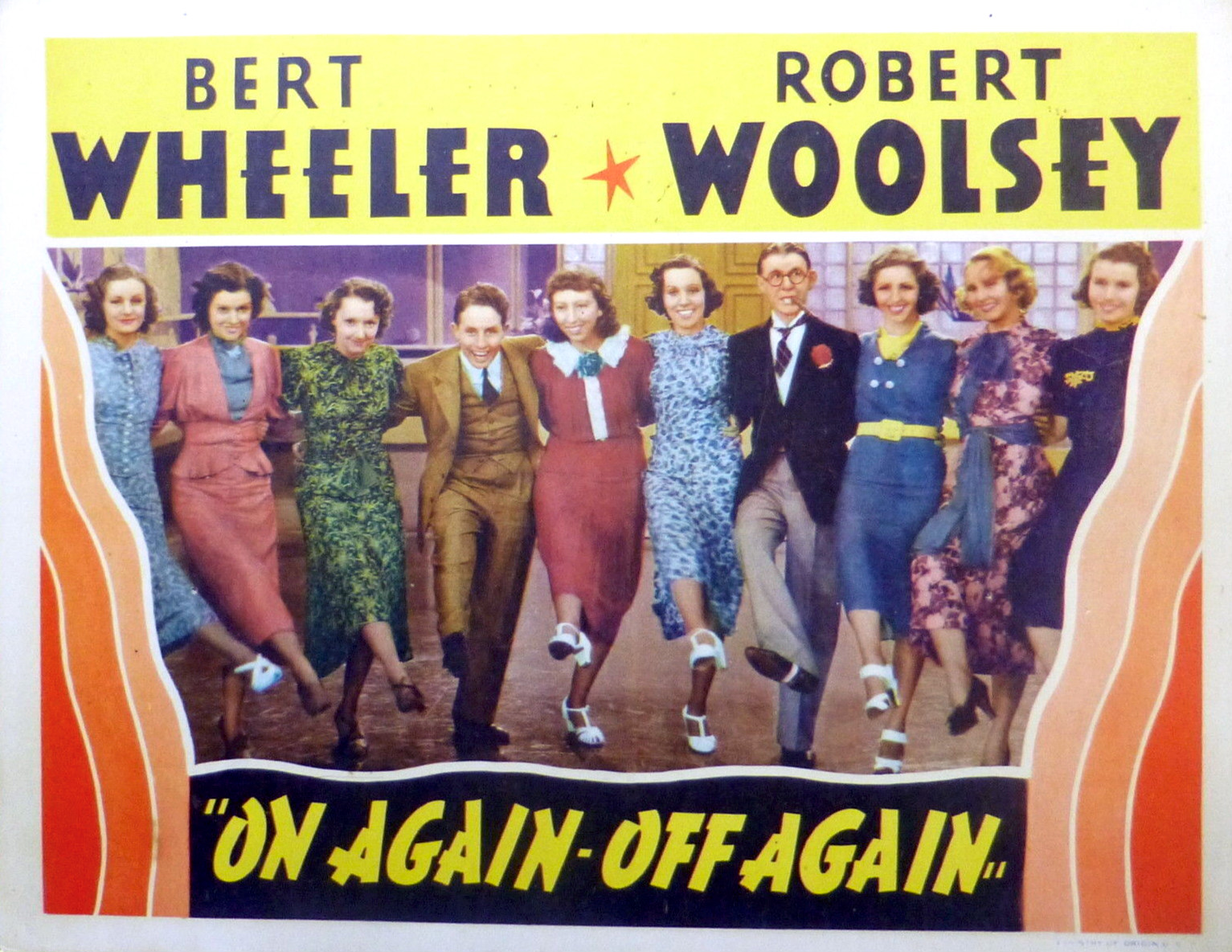
- Lobby card
- Directed by: Edward Cline
- Written by: Nat Perrin (screenplay); Benny Rubin (screenplay)
- Produced by: Lee S. Marcus; Samuel J. Briskin (executive producer)
- Starring: Bert Wheeler; Robert Woolsey; Marjorie Lord; Patricia Wilder; Esther Muir
- Cinematography: Jack MacKenzie
- Edited by: John Lockert
- Music by: Dave Dreyer; Roy Webb
- Production company: RKO Radio Pictures
- Distributed by: RKO Radio Pictures
- Release date: July 9, 1937
- Running time: 68 minutes
- Country: United States
- Language: English

On Again-Off Again is a 1937 American musical comedy film released by RKO Radio Pictures and starring the comedy team of Wheeler & Woolsey.

== Plot ==
William Hobbs and Claude Horton own a drug-manufacturing company and continuously bicker with each another. Their lawyer George Dilwig suggests a wrestling match between the two men, with the winner gaining full ownership of the company and the loser serving as the winner's butler for one year.

== Cast ==
- Bert Wheeler as William Hobbs
- Robert Woolsey as Claude Horton
- Marjorie Lord as Florence Cole
- Patricia Wilder as Gertie Green
- Esther Muir as Nettie Horton
- Paul Harvey as Mr. Applegate
- Russell Hicks as George Dilwig
- George Meeker as Tony
- Maxine Jennings as Miss Meeker
- Kitty McHugh as Miss Parker
- Hal K. Dawson as Sanford
- Alec Harford as Slip Grogan
- Pat Flaherty as Mr. Green

== Production ==
The film is based on the 1914 play A Pair of Sixes by Edward Peple.

Robert Woolsey was suffering from kidney disease throughout production of the film and experienced constant pain.

== Reception ==
In a contemporary review for The New York Times, critic Thomas M. Pryor wrote: "The new opus is no better and, perhaps, no worse than most of their previous excursions in the realm of low comedy. The boys are to be commended for their continued unabashed delivery of old gags."

Modern Screen’s Leo Townsend wrote that "those hardy perennials, Wheeler and Woolsey … [have] been handed a script that is slightly superior to the sort of thing they’ve been getting lately", and although some of "their gags are ancient … their slapstick is less broad and their sets look more expensive than usual, all of which makes their antics less painful than usual to those in the audience who aren’t wildly enthusiastic about them."

The Film Daily gave a more positive review, and wrote, "This will please the Wheeler and Woolsey fans and will ring up a healthy total of laughs. Edward F. Cline has done an excellent job of guiding the comedians in their various antics … Patricia Wilder, Esther Muir, Marjorie Lord, a winsome newcomer, Russell Hicks, Paul Harvey and George Meeker are among the principals who do good work."
