= The Rainmakers (film) =

1935 film by Fred Guiol

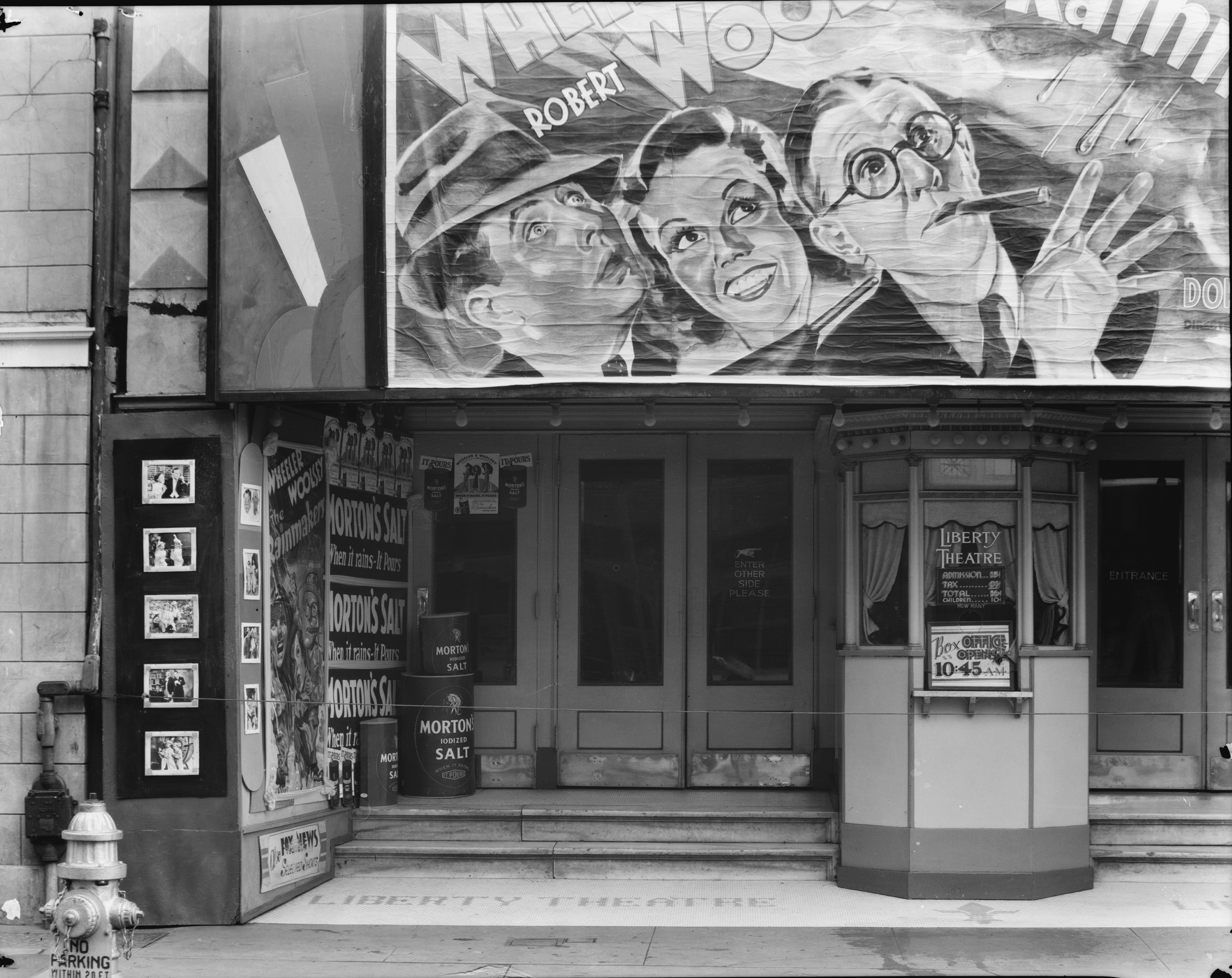
- Liberty Theater in New Orleans showing the film
- Directed by: Fred Guiol
- Screenplay by: Grant Garrett; Leslie Goodwins
- Story by: Albert Traynor; Fred Guiol
- Produced by: Associate producer Lee Marcus
- Starring: Bert Wheeler; Robert Woolsey; Dorothy Lee
- Cinematography: Ted McCord
- Edited by: John Lockert
- Music by: Roy Webb
- Production company: RKO Radio Pictures
- Release date: October 25, 1935
- Running time: 79 minutes
- Country: United States
- Language: English

The Rainmakers is a 1935 American comedy film directed by Fred Guiol from a screenplay by Grant Garrett and Leslie Goodwins, based on a story by Guiol and Albert Traynor. RKO Radio Pictures released the film on October 25, 1935, starring the comedy team of Wheeler & Woolsey (Bert Wheeler and Robert Woolsey) and Dorothy Lee.

== Plot ==
Rainmakers Billy and Roscoe take on a crooked businessman out to cash in on a drought.

== Cast ==
- Bert Wheeler as Billy
- Robert Woolsey as Roscoe
- Dorothy Lee as Margie Spencer
- Berton Churchill as Simon Parker
- George Meeker as Orville Parker
- Frederic Roland as Henry Spencer
- Edgar Dearing as Kelly
