= The Nitwits =

1935 film directed by George Stevens

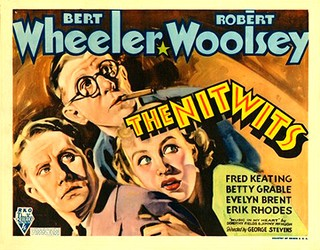
- Original theatrical poster
- Directed by: George Stevens
- Screenplay by: Fred Guiol; Al Boasberg
- Story by: Stuart Palmer
- Produced by: Lee Marcus
- Starring: Bert Wheeler; Robert Woolsey
- Cinematography: Edward Cronjager
- Edited by: John Lockert
- Music by: Roy Webb
- Production company: RKO Radio Pictures
- Release date: June 7, 1935
- Running time: 81 minutes
- Country: United States
- Language: English

The Nitwits is a 1935 American comedy film directed by George Stevens from a screenplay written by Fred Guiol and Al Boasberg, based on a story by Stuart Palmer. Released by RKO on June 7, 1935, the film stars the comedy duo of Wheeler & Woolsey (Bert Wheeler and Robert Woolsey), with featured roles being filled by Fred Keating, Betty Grable, Evelyn Brent and Erik Rhodes.

Fred Keating replaced Lionel Atwill, who later played the villain in the 1946 remake, Genius at Work.

== Plot ==
Cigar-stand attendants Johnny and Newton get mixed up in a murder investigation at a radio station.

== Cast ==
- Bert Wheeler as Johnny
- Robert Woolsey as Newton
- Fred Keating as William Darrell
- Betty Grable as Mary Roberts
- Evelyn Brent as Alice Lake
- Erik Rhodes as George Clark
- Hale Hamilton as Winfield Lake
- Charles C. Wilson as Police Captain Jennings
- Arthur Aylesworth as Lurch
- Willie Best as Sleepy
- Lew Kelly as J. Gabriel Hazel

== Production ==
The film's original title was Mellodicks, which Lee Marcus, the producer, found repugnant. He offered $50 to any employee of RKO who could come up with a better title. While he received numerous suggestions, he finally settled on the picture's final title, which had been a generic title around the RKO lot for years.
