= Kentucky Kernels =

1934 film by George Stevens

- Directed by: George Stevens
- Screenplay by: Bert Kalmar; Harry Ruby; Fred Guiol
- Story by: Bert Kalmar; Harry Ruby
- Produced by: Lee Marcus; H. N. Swanson (associate)
- Starring: Bert Wheeler; Robert Woolsey; Mary Carlisle; Spanky McFarland; Noah Beery
- Cinematography: Edward Cronjager
- Edited by: James Morley
- Music by: Roy Webb
- Production company: RKO Radio Pictures
- Release date: November 2, 1934 (US)
- Running time: 75 minutes
- Country: United States
- Language: English

Kentucky Kernels is a 1934 American comedy directed by George Stevens and starring the comedy duo of Bert Wheeler and Robert Woolsey. The screenplay was written by Bert Kalmar, Harry Ruby, and Fred Guiol, from a story by Kalmar and Ruby.

== Plot ==
The Great Elmer and Company, two out-of-work magicians, help lovelorn Jerry Bronson adopt Spanky Milford, to distract him. When Bronson makes up and elopes, the pair are stuck with the little boy. But Spanky inherits a Kentucky fortune, so they head south to Banesville, where the Milfords and Wakefields are conducting a bitter feud.

== Cast ==
- Bert Wheeler as Willie Doyle
- Robert Woolsey as Elmer Dugan
- Mary Carlisle as Gloria Wakefield
- 'Spanky' McFarland as Spanky
- Noah Beery as Colonel Wakefield
- Lucille LaVerne as Aunt Hannah Milford
- Margaret Dumont as Mrs. Baxter
- Sleep 'n' Eat as Buckshot
- Dorothy Granger as Ethel, Baxter's Secretary (uncredited)
- Harry Bernard as Destitute Man (uncredited)
- Charlie Hall as Cigarette Stand Owner (uncredited)
- Clarence Wilson (actor) as Peck, a Lawyer (uncredited)
