= Mummy's Boys =

1936 film by Fred Guiol

- Theatrical release poster
- Directed by: Fred Guiol; James Anderson (assistant)
- Screenplay by: Jack Townley; Philip G. Epstein; Charles E. Roberts
- Story by: Jack Townley; Lew Lipton
- Produced by: Lee S. Marcus
- Starring: Bert Wheeler; Robert Woolsey; Barbara Pepper; Moroni Olsen; Frank M. Thomas; Willie Best
- Cinematography: Jack MacKenzie
- Edited by: John Lockert
- Music by: Roy Webb
- Production company: RKO Pictures
- Distributed by: RKO Pictures
- Release date: October 2, 1936
- Running time: 68 minutes
- Country: United States
- Language: English

Mummy's Boys is a 1936 American comedy film directed by Fred Guiol and written by Jack Townley, Philip G. Epstein and Charles E. Roberts. The film stars Bert Wheeler, Robert Woolsey, Barbara Pepper, Moroni Olsen, Frank M. Thomas and Willie Best. The film was released on October 2, 1936, by RKO Pictures.

== Plot ==
Phillip Browning, convinced that the mysterious deaths of ten of his colleagues is the result of a mummy's curse, hopes to avoid the fate of the others by returning King Pharatime's treasures to his tomb. Ditch diggers Stanley Wright and Aloysius C. Whittaker answer a newspaper advertisement to join Browning's Egyptian expedition. Whittaker presents himself (unconvincingly) as an Egyptian expert, and Wright—who is immediately attracted to Browning's daughter Mary—makes a poor impression because he suffers spells of forgetfulness that can be cured only by taking a nap. (This is a running gag throughout the film.) Browning hires them anyway.

On board the ship to Egypt the next day the boys meet Sterling, who is part of the expedition. Catfish, a stowaway, is invited to join the group after he mentions that he is from Cairo—although Whittaker and Wright later discover that he is from Cairo, Illinois. After the group arrives at their hotel, Sterling disappears mysteriously and a threatening note is found.

Soon after they arrive at their encampment, Whittaker, Wright and Mary awake to find Catfish tied up and everyone else gone. They find another threatening note in Browning's tent. They open Mr. Browning's instructions, which direct them to dig to the tomb entrance and place the boxes containing the treasures in the tomb. The three men dig until they have the entrance cleared, and start carrying the boxes into the tomb. The scene cuts to a secret room of the tomb, where Sterling has Browning tied up and gagged. Sterling reveals that he killed the other ten with a syringe containing undetectable poison, and plans to do the same to Browning, Mary, Whittaker and Wright. He leaves, but accidentally drops a diary, which Wright later picks up.

A landslide seals the entrance and traps Whittaker, Wright, Mary and Catfish in the tomb. As they search for a way out, Sterling approaches them, pretending to be a victim of kidnapping and professing to believe in the curse. Wright reveals that he knows the deaths are actually murders—he has read the diary, but has not yet learned the identity of the killer. He does not recall where he hid the diary, and needs to take a nap to remember. Sterling offers to inject him with a "sedative". Wright, fearing the syringe, leads them all on a merry chase, ending when he hits Sterling on the head with a vase. The vase smashes, revealing the diary, which Whittaker picks up. He examines it and realizes that Sterling is the murderer.

The police arrive at the camp, enter the tomb, and bring Sterling to justice. The Egyptian spy who warned Wright over the phone turns out to be an Egyptian secret policeman, Rasheed Bey, who was investigating Sterling.

At the fadeout, Wright has something he wants to say to Mary, but can't remember what it is.

== Cast ==
- Bert Wheeler as Stanley Wright
- Robert Woolsey as Aloysius C. Whittaker
- Barbara Pepper as Mary Browning
- Moroni Olsen as Dr. Edward Sterling
- Frank M. Thomas as Phillip Browning
- Willie Best as Catfish
- Francis McDonald as Rasheed Bey
- Frank Lackteen as Second Oriental
- Charles Coleman as Kendall
- Mitchell Lewis as Haroun Pasha
- Frederick Burton as Professor Edwards
