= Bert Wheeler =

American actor (1895–1968)

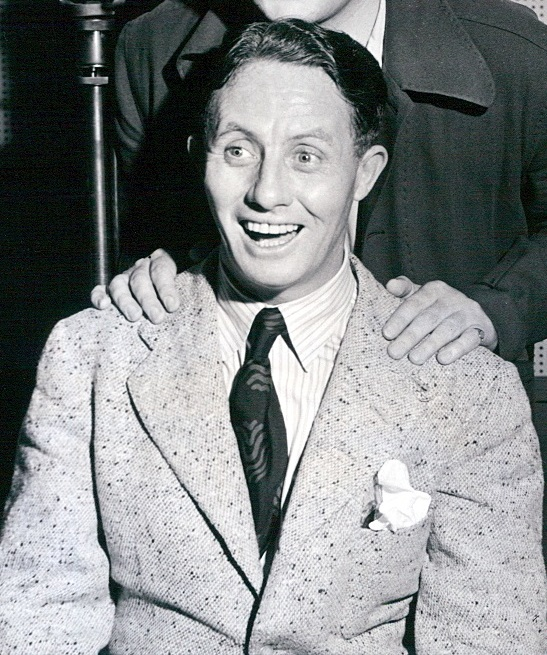
- Wheeler in 1941
- Born: April 7, 1895; Paterson, New Jersey, U.S.
- Died: January 18, 1968 (aged 72); New York City, U.S.
- Occupations: Actor, Comedian
- Years active: 1920–1962
- Known for: Wheeler & Woolsey
- Spouses: Margaret Grae (m. 1915; div. 1926) Bernice Speer (m. 1928; div. 1936) Sally Haines (m. 1937; div. 1939) Patsy Orr (m. 1940; div. 1950) Olga Desmondae Rieman (m. 1951; died 1966)
- Children: 1

Albert Jerome Wheeler (April 7, 1895 – January 18, 1968) was an American comedian who performed in vaudeville acts, Broadway theatre, American comedy feature films, and television. He was teamed with Broadway comic Robert Woolsey, and they went on to fame as Wheeler & Woolsey.

== Early career ==
Wheeler was born Albert Jerome Wheeler in Paterson, New Jersey on April 7, 1895. He began his career performing in vaudeville in an act with Russ Brown. During the 1920s Wheeler and his first wife, Margaret Grae, became a very successful vaudeville act, Bert and Betty Wheeler. Wheeler established immediate rapport with his audiences by sitting on the edge of the stage.

== Wheeler & Woolsey ==
Bert Wheeler was working on Broadway with Robert Woolsey—not as a comedy team, but as performers playing character roles in the same show. A screen adaptation of their stage hit Rio Rita (1929) launched them in motion pictures.

Rio Rita's production company, RKO Radio Pictures, was slow to see the potential of Wheeler & Woolsey. The studio signed Bert Wheeler to a movie contract during production, but not Robert Woolsey. It wasn't until the financial returns came in for Rio Rita that RKO signed both Woolsey and ingenue Dorothy Lee to appear in further films alongside Wheeler.

From their first starring vehicle, The Cuckoos (1930), Wheeler & Woolsey established themselves as a popular comedy team, and their films were dizzy conglomerations of joke-book dialogue, awful puns, elaborate visual gags, witty musical numbers, and scantily clad chorus girls (with Woolsey offering double-entendre jokes all the while).

By 1931 Wheeler & Woolsey were so popular that RKO attempted to generate twice the Wheeler & Woolsey income by making two solo pictures—one with Wheeler (Too Many Cooks) and one with Woolsey (Everything's Rosie). This experiment failed, and they returned to performing as a team. They continued to make popular feature films until 1937, when Woolsey became too ill to work.

Director Charles Reisner tried to keep Wheeler at the studio, proposing a series of comedy features co-starring Wheeler and Dorothy Lee. The studio declined, reasoning that audiences would expect to be seeing Woolsey as well. Wheeler was released by the studio. The next scheduled Wheeler & Woolsey picture, the 1938 musical Radio City Revels, was retooled as a vehicle for Jack Oakie; Wheeler's wardrobe was assigned to comic dancer Buster West.

== After Woolsey ==
In 1938, after Robert Woolsey died, Bert Wheeler struggled to restart his career. His friend and former film costar Dorothy Lee agreed to tour with him in a vaudeville act early that year. He landed occasional roles in movies through 1941; his last feature film, Las Vegas Nights (1941), found Wheeler working with a new partner, comedian and comedy writer Hank Ladd.

During the 1940s Wheeler became a nightclub comedian. In 1943 he worked on radio on The Frank Sinatra Show. In 1945 he co-starred with Jackie Gleason in a nightclub engagement; five years later Gleason invited him to appear several times on his TV variety hour Cavalcade of Stars. Wheeler's last theatrical films were two slapstick shorts for Columbia Pictures, filmed in 1950 and produced by Jules White: Innocently Guilty and The Awful Sleuth.

Wheeler also kept up a busy schedule of live performances in nightclubs and on the legitimate stage, in such plays as Harvey (in the leading role of Elwood P. Dowd, earning rave reviews as Frank Fay's summer replacement in 1946) and Three Wishes for Jamie. In 1955 Wheeler co-starred with Keith Larsen in the CBS western series Brave Eagle; Wheeler played the "half-breed" Smokey Joe, known for his tall tales and tribal wisdom.

Wheeler continued to work in nightclubs, theater, and television through the 1960s, either alone or with comedian and singer Tom Dillon.

== Death ==
Bert Wheeler died of emphysema in New York City on January 18, 1968.

== Filmography ==
(As per the AFI database)

Title	Year	Role	Notes
Rio Rita	1929	Chick Bean	film debut
Dixiana	1930	Peewee	
The Cuckoos	1930	Sparrow	
Half Shot at Sunrise	1930	Tommy Turner	
Hook, Line and Sinker	1930	Wilbur Boswell	
Caught Plastered	1931	Tommy Tanner	
Too Many Cooks	1931	Albert Bennett	without Woolsey
Peach-O-Reno	1931	Wattles	
Cracked Nuts	1931	Wendell Graham	
Hold 'Em Jail	1932	Curly Harris	
Girl Crazy	1932	Jimmy Deegan	
Diplomaniacs	1933	Willy Nilly	
So This Is Africa	1933	Wilbur Wheeler	
Kentucky Kernels	1934	Willie Doyle	
Hips, Hips, Hooray!	1934	Andy Williams	
Cockeyed Cavaliers	1934	Bert Winstanley	
The Nitwits	1935	Johnny	
The Rainmakers	1935	Billy	
Silly Billies	1936	Roy Banks	
Mummy's Boys	1936	Stanley Wright	
On Again-Off Again	1937	William "Willy" Hobbs	
High Flyers	1937	Jerry Lane	
The Cowboy Quarterback	1939	Harry Lynn	without Woolsey
Las Vegas Nights	1941	Stu Grant	without Woolsey
Innocently Guilty	1950	Hodkinson G. Pogglebrewer	short subject, without Woolsey
The Awful Sleuth	1951	Bert Wheeler	short subject, without Woolsey

== Marriages ==
Wheeler was married five times. His only child, with Speer, was Patricia Anne Wheeler.

- Margaret Grae (m. 27 April 1915 to 15 November 1926) divorced.
- Bernice Speer (m. 15 April 1928 to 19 February 1936) divorced, they had 1 child.
- Sally Haines (m. 26 February 1937 to 1939) divorced.
- Patsy Orr (c1940 to c1950) divorced.
- Olga Desmondae Rieman (m. 1951 - 8 August 1966) to her death.

== Home video releases ==
Nine of Wheeler's 21 feature films were released in a DVD collection entitled "Wheeler & Woolsey: RKO Comedy Classics Collection" in March 2013 by Warner Archive. A second volume comprising six more titles was released by Warner in October 2016.

His 1929 Vitaphone playlet Small Timers and his 1950 Columbia shorts have not yet been released to video.
