= Hips, Hips, Hooray! =

1934 film by Mark Sandrich

- Directed by: Mark Sandrich
- Written by: Bert Kalmar; Edward Kaufman; Harry Ruby
- Starring: Bert Wheeler; Robert Woolsey; Ruth Etting; Thelma Todd; Dorothy Lee
- Cinematography: David Abel
- Edited by: Basil Wrangell
- Music by: Roy Webb (Uncredited)
- Distributed by: RKO Radio Pictures
- Release date: February 2, 1934 (U.S.)
- Running time: 68 minutes
- Country: United States
- Language: English
- Budget: $336,000
- Box office: $625,000

Hips, Hips, Hooray! is a 1934 American pre-Code slapstick comedy starring Bert Wheeler, Robert Woolsey, Ruth Etting, Thelma Todd and Dorothy Lee. During its initial theatrical run, it was preceded by the two-color Technicolor short Not Tonight, Josephine, directed by Edward F. Cline.

== Plot ==
Amelia Frisby owns a beauty-supply business. Andy Williams and Dr. Bob Dudley convince her to hire them as salesmen to promote her new flavored lipstick.

== Cast ==
- Bert Wheeler as Andy Williams
- Robert Woolsey as Dr. Bob Dudley
- Dorothy Lee as Daisy Maxwell
- Thelma Todd as Amelia Frisby
- Ruth Etting as Herself
- Phyllis Barry as Madame Irene
- Matt Briggs as Det. Epstein
- James P. Burtis as Detective Sweeney
- Spencer Charters as Clark
- George Meeker as Armand Beauchamp
- Doris McMahon as Maid
- Thelma White as Blonde (uncredited)

== Production ==
A romantic subplot involving Ruth Etting was planned, but it was removed from the film. Despite her high billing, Etting only has one scene.

The film features Etting singing "Keep Romance Alive" and Bert Wheeler and Dorothy Lee singing "Keep on Doin' What You're Doin'" by Bert Kalmar and Harry Ruby, a song originally intended for the Marx Brothers' 1933 film Duck Soup.

== Reception ==
In a contemporary review for The New York Times, critic Andre Sennwald wrote: "Those who admire the comic gifts of the cigar-smoking Woolsey and the cherub-faced Wheeler will find their faith nourished by the usual sum of ponderous jocosities. ... There are three reasonably hilarious gags and perhaps fifty more that depend on whether you are for or against the ex-vaudeville clowns to begin with."

The film returned a profit of $8,000.
