= Robert Woolsey =

American comedian (1888–1938)

Robert R. Woolsey
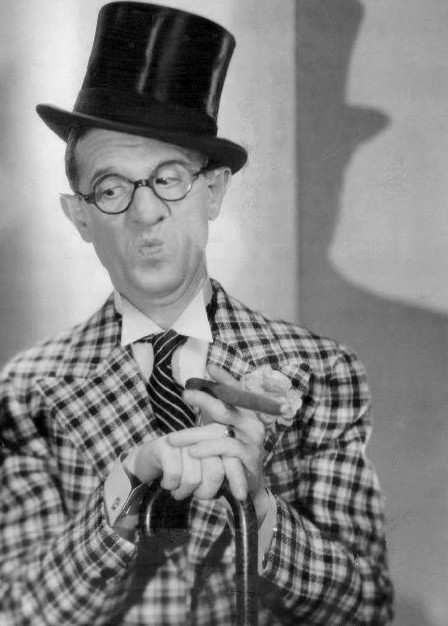
- Woolsey in 1931
- Born: August 14, 1888; Carbondale, Illinois, U.S.
- Died: October 31, 1938 (aged 50); Malibu, California, U.S.
- Resting place: Forest Lawn Memorial Park Cemetery
- Occupations: Actor, comedian
- Years active: 1918-1937
- Known for: Wheeler & Woolsey
- Spouse: Mignone Park Reed (m. 1917)

Robert Rollie Woolsey (August 14, 1888 – October 31, 1938) was an American stage and screen comedian and half of the 1930s comedy team Wheeler & Woolsey.

== Early life ==
Robert Rollie Woolsey (sometimes spelled Rolla or even Raleigh) was born on August 14, 1888, in Carbondale, Illinois to James Monroe Woolsey and Sarah Eunice Woolsey (née Noble), both also born in Illinois. According to the World War I Draft register, filled out and signed by Woolsey, his name is given as Robert Rolla Woolsey. Woolsey, who had brown eyes and hair with a slight and slender build tried to capitalize on his size, as a young adult, by becoming a jockey. After he fell from a horse and sustained a fractured leg, he quit racing and turned instead to the vaudeville stage. In 1925 he was featured as "Mortimer Pottle" in W. C. Fields's Broadway hit Poppy.

== Wheeler and Woolsey ==
Woolsey was teamed with comedy star Bert Wheeler in 1928, for the Broadway musical Rio Rita. RKO Radio Pictures filmed the play in 1929, launching Wheeler and Woolsey as movie personalities. Woolsey's comic character was a fast-talking, genially leering, cigar-smoking, wisecracking, and self-confident operator—but one who was not always as smart as he thought he was. Ready for any hare-brained scheme, he would often lead Wheeler's more naive, gullible and sweet-natured character into (and only sometimes out of) trouble.

Woolsey made only two films without Wheeler. In 1930 he hosted a "Voice of Hollywood" short, playing a radio announcer who introduced movie stars to the audience. In 1931 RKO tried to generate twice the Wheeler & Woolsey income by splitting the team, with Wheeler and Woolsey starring solo in one film each. Woolsey's solo effort was Everything's Rosie (1931).

== Personal life ==
From 1921 to his death in 1938, Woolsey was married to Georgia girl Mignone Park (Minnie) Reed, daughter of Mrs. Mary Reed.

=== Illness and death ===
Woolsey became terminally ill in 1936 and struggled to finish his last picture, High Flyers, which was released in 1937. He was then confined to bed for almost a full year, ending his performing career.

Bert Wheeler last saw him in June 1938: "I knew Woolsey was very, very ill, and when I saw him lying there suffering, I knew what he was going through... He didn't have a chance and he knew it, and he didn't try to fight it." He died on October 31, 1938, aged 50, from kidney failure and cerebral malaria.

== Filmography ==
(As per the AFI database)

Title	Year	Role	Notes
Rio Rita	1929	Ned Lovett	
Dixiana	1930	Ginger Dandy	
The Cuckoos	1930	Professor Cunningham	
Half Shot at Sunrise	1930	Gilbert	
Hook, Line and Sinker	1930	Addington Ganzy	
Everything's Rosie	1931	Dr. J. Dockweiler Droop	Woolsey solo, without Wheeler.
Caught Plastered	1931	Egbert G. Higginbotham	
Peach O'Reno	1931	Julius Swift	
Cracked Nuts	1931	Zander Ulysses "Zup" Parkhurst	
Hold 'Em Jail	1932	Spider Robbins	
Girl Crazy	1932	Slick Foster	
Diplomaniacs	1933	Hercules Glub	
So This Is Africa	1933	Alexander Woolsey	
Kentucky Kernels	1934	"The Great" Elmer Dugan	
Hips, Hips, Hooray!	1934	Dr. Bob Dudley	
Cockeyed Cavaliers	1934	Robert Maltravers	
The Nitwits	1935	Newton	
The Rainmakers	1935	Roscoe the Rainmaker	
Silly Billies	1936	Dr. Philip "Painless" Pennington	
Mummy's Boys	1936	Aloysius C. Whittaker	
On Again-Off Again	1937	Claude (Augustus) Horton	
High Flyers	1937	Pierre Potkins	Final film role.

== DVD releases ==
Nine of Wheeler and Woolsey's 21 movies were released in a DVD collection entitled "Wheeler & Woolsey: RKO Comedy Classics Collection" in March 2013 by Warner Archive.

{U.S. Census Records indicate he was born in Carbondale, Jackson Co, IL}
