= Too Many Cooks (film) =

1931 film directed by William A. Seiter

- Theatrical release poster
- Directed by: William A. Seiter
- Screenplay by: Jane Murfin
- Based on: Too Many Cooks; 1914 play by Frank Craven
- Produced by: William LeBaron
- Starring: Bert Wheeler; Dorothy Lee; Roscoe Ates; Robert McWade
- Cinematography: Nicholas Musuraca
- Edited by: Arthur Roberts
- Production company: RKO Radio Pictures
- Distributed by: RKO Radio Pictures
- Release date: July 18, 1931
- Running time: 77 minutes
- Country: United States
- Language: English

Too Many Cooks is a 1931 American pre-Code comedy film directed by William A. Seiter, written by Jane Murfin and starring Bert Wheeler, Dorothy Lee, Roscoe Ates and Robert McWade. It was released on July 18, 1931 by RKO Pictures. In 1948 it was remade as the Mexican film The Newlywed Wants a House.

== Plot ==
Engaged couple Albert Bennett and Alice Cook plan to leave the city to build their dream house in the country. They argue about the floorplan, particularly an upstairs room that Albert wishes to use as a den and Alice wants as a sewing room. The problem is worsened when Alice’s family members come to help, each offering opinions about the room.

Albert’s bachelor uncle and employer George inspects the house. He is enthusiastic about the recent return of his friend's young daughter Minnie from Europe, where she completed her cultural education. George hopes that Albert might cancel the upcoming wedding and court the virtuous Minnie. Albert refuses, describing Alice's virtues in a similarly positive light.

George offers to pay for the room if he may inhabit it when the house is built. Alice’s family vehemently opposes the idea, prompting George to mention Minnie as someone whom Albert could pursue. Alice cancels the engagement, returning her ring to Albert and tearfully suggesting that it might fit Minnie's finger. George fires Albert.

Albert, unemployed and single, completes the house himself but then decides to sell it. Alice returns to see the now completed house and reconciles with Albert. George, now married to Minnie, returns and rehires Albert. George purchases the house but then returns it to Albert and Alice as a wedding gift.

== Cast ==
- Bert Wheeler as Albert 'Al' Bennett
- Dorothy Lee as Alice Cook
- Roscoe Ates as Mr. Wilson
- Robert McWade as Uncle George Bennett
- Sharon Lynn as Ella Mayer
- Hallam Cooley as Frank Andrews
- Florence Roberts as Mrs. Cook
- George Chandler as Cousin Ned
- Clifford Dempsey as Mr. Michael J. Cook
- Ruth Weston as Minnie Spring

== Preservation status ==
- A copy is preserved in the Library of Congress collection as with many RKO features.
