= Betty Grable filmography =

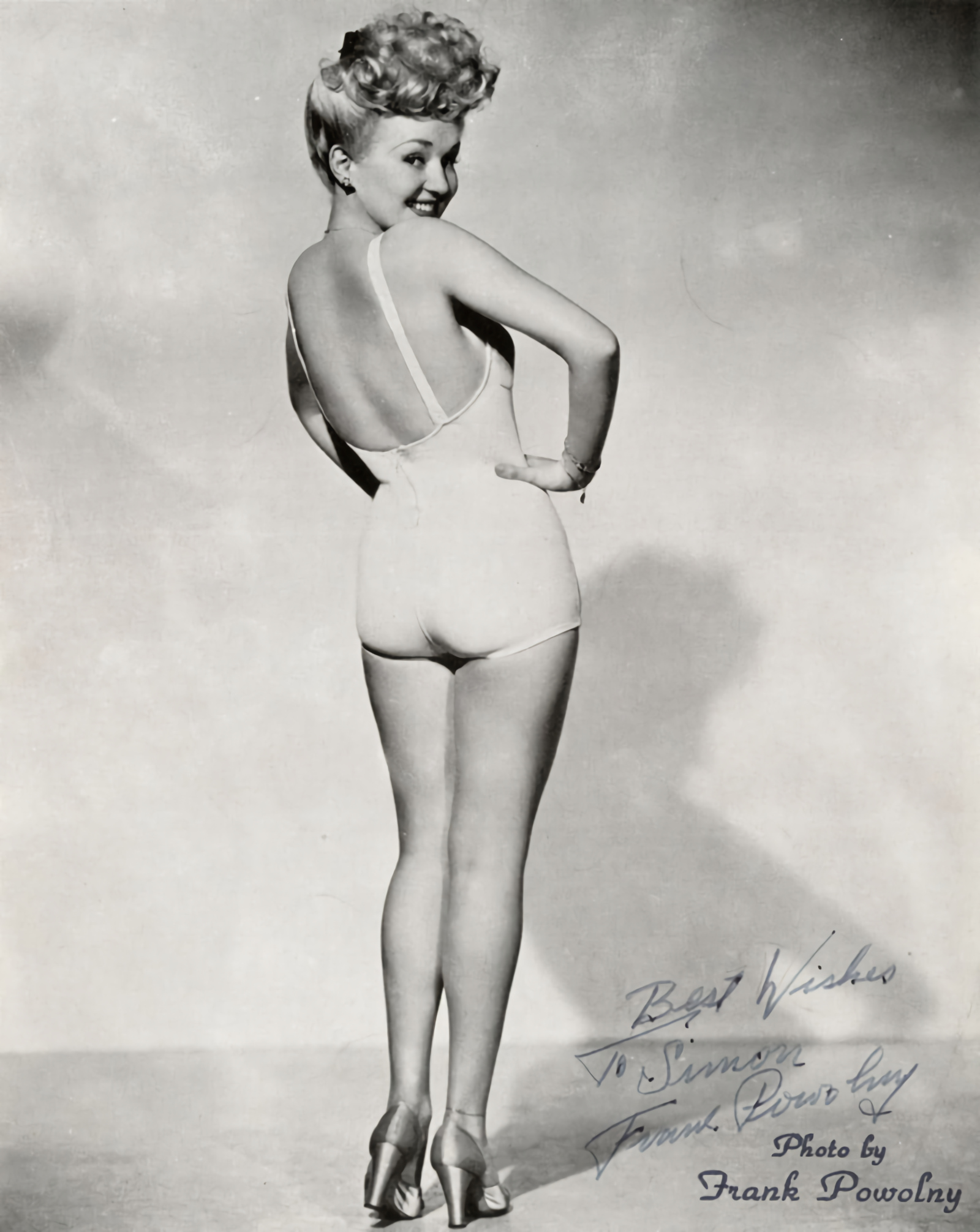
Betty Grable (1916–1973) in her famous 1943 pin-up. It was shot by studio photographer Frank Powolny and became one of the biggest-selling photographs of World War II, selling over five million copies.

This is a complete filmography of Betty Grable, an American actress, dancer, and singer. As a major contract star for 20th Century-Fox during the 1940s and 1950s, she starred in a succession of musicals and romantic comedies.

Grable began her career in 1929 at age twelve, after which she was fired from a contract when it was learned she signed up under false identification. She made her film debut in Happy Days (1929) as an unbilled extra appearing in blackface. Grable had contracts with RKO Radio Pictures and Paramount Pictures during the 1930s, and she starred in roles as college students in a string of B-movies. In the campus musical Pigskin Parade (1936), she received positive reviews, but her performance was overshadowed by newcomer Judy Garland.

She eventually came to prominence in the Broadway musical Du Barry Was a Lady (1939) and signed an exclusive long-term contract with 20th Century-Fox. After replacing Alice Faye in Down Argentine Way (1940), she became the studio's biggest asset throughout the following decade, starring in a series of commercially successful musicals and comedies, often co-starring with renowned leading men, including Victor Mature, Don Ameche, John Payne, Tyrone Power, and Dan Dailey. Between 1941 and 1951, she was consistently listed in the "Top Ten Moneymaking Stars Poll", sometimes as the only female on the list. In 1943 and 1944, she was the number one box office draw in the United States. Her famous 1943 pin-up became one of the most-identified photographs of World War II.

The majority of Grable's films followed the traditional backstage musical genre point-by-point. Plot point one: boy meets girl; plot point two: boy teams up with girl; plot point three: girl dumps boy; and plot point four: boy and girl reunite in time for the finale. Despite the often similar storylines, her films remained immensely popularity for over a decade, some of them becoming the year's highest-grossing films, including Springtime in the Rockies (1942), Coney Island (1943), The Dolly Sisters (1945), and When My Baby Smiles at Me (1948). Two of her greatest successes were Pin Up Girl (1944) (which showcased her famous pin-up) and Mother Wore Tights (1947). The 1949 western comedy The Beautiful Blonde from Bashful Bend was Grable's first film in nine years to lose money financially.

The changing tastes of the public and the waning popularity of the musical genre in the early 1950s contributed to Grable's career decline. Although Wabash Avenue and My Blue Avenue (both 1950) were successes, some of her films thereafter failed to live up to their hype. How to Marry a Millionaire (1953), a comedy about three models scheming to marry wealthy husbands, was one of her last big successes for Fox. She co-starred with newcomer Marilyn Monroe and Lauren Bacall, and while tabloids publicized a rivalry between the three women, they nevertheless became close friends. In 1953, she declined to renew her contract with Fox, hoping to revitalize her stage career. This move was not successful and, after falling into bankruptcy, Grable returned to the studio for what would be her final film: the satirical comedy How to Be Very, Very Popular (1955), which parodied her earlier films in some aspects.

== Credits ==
=== Film appearances ===
List of acting credits in film, with directors and principal cast members
Title	Year	Role	Director	Co-stars	Notes
Happy Days	1929	Chorus Girl	Benjamin Stoloff	Charles E. Evans; Marjorie White; Richard Keene	Uncredited
Let's Go Places	1930	Chorine	Frank R. Strayer	Joseph Wagstaff; Lola Lane	Uncredited
New Movietone Follies of 1930	1930	Chorine	Benjamin Stoloff	El Brendel; Marjorie White	Uncredited
Whoopee!	1930	Goldwyn Girl	Thornton Freeland	Eddie Cantor; Ethel Shutta; Eleanor Hunt	Uncredited
Kiki	1931	Goldwyn Girl	Sam Taylor	Mary Pickford	Uncredited
Palmy Days	1931	Goldwyn Girl	A. Edward Sutherland	Charlotte Greenwood; Barbara Weeks; Spencer Charters	Uncredited
The Greeks Had a Word for Them	1932	Hat Check Girl	Lowell Sherman	Joan Blondell; Madge Evans; Ina Claire	Uncredited
Probation	1932	Ruth Jarrett	Richard Thorpe	John Darrow; Sally Blane	Grable's first credited role
The Age of Consent	1932	Student at Dormitory	Gregory La Cava	Dorothy Wilson; Arline Judge	Uncredited
Hold 'Em Jail	1932	Barbara Jones	Norman Taurog	Bert Wheeler; Robert Woolsey; Edna May Oliver	
The Kid from Spain	1932	Goldwyn Girl	Leo McCarey	Eddie Cantor; Lyda Roberti; Robert Young	Uncredited
Child of Manhattan	1933	Lucy McGonegle	Edward Buzzell	Nancy Carroll; John Boles	
Cavalcade	1933	Girl on couch	Frank Lloyd	Diana Wynyard; Clive Brook; Una O'Connor	Uncredited
Melody Cruise	1933	First Stewardess	Mark Sandrich	Charles Ruggles; Phil Harris	Uncredited
What Price Innocence?	1933	Beverly Bennett	Willard Mack	Jean Parker; Minna Gombell; Willard Mack	
The Sweetheart of Sigma Chi	1933	Band Singer with Ted Fio Rito	Edwin L. Marin	Mary Carlisle; Buster Crabbe	
The Gay Divorcee	1934	Dance Specialty	Mark Sandrich	Fred Astaire; Ginger Rogers	
Student Tour	1934	Cayenne	Charles Reisner	Jimmy Durante; Charles Butterworth; Maxine Doyle	
By Your Leave	1934	Frances Gretchell	Lloyd Corrigan	Frank Morgan; Genevieve Tobin	
The Nitwits	1935	Mary Roberts	George Stevens	Bert Wheeler; Robert Woolsey	
Old Man Rhythm	1935	Sylvia	Edward Ludwig	Charles 'Buddy' Rogers; George Barbier	
Collegiate	1936	Dorothy	Ralph Murphy	Joe Penner; Jack Oakie; Ned Sparks	
Follow the Fleet	1936	Trio Singer	Mark Sandrich	Fred Astaire; Ginger Rogers	
Don't Turn 'Em Loose	1936	Mildred Webster	Benjamin Stoloff	Lewis Stone; James Gleason; Bruce Cabot	
Pigskin Parade	1936	Laura Watson	David Butler	Stuart Erwin; Patsy Kelly; Judy Garland; Jack Haley	
This Way Please	1937	Jane Morrow	Robert Florey	Charles 'Buddy' Rogers	
Thrill of a Lifetime	1937	Gwen	George Archainbaud	The Yacht Club Boys	
College Swing	1938	Betty	Raoul Walsh	George Burns; Gracie Allen; Martha Raye; Bob Hope; Edward Everett Horton	
Give Me a Sailor	1938	Nancy Larkin	Elliott Nugent	Bob Hope; Jack Whiting; Martha Raye	
Campus Confessions	1938	Joyce Gilmore	George Archainbaud	Eleanore Whitney; William Henry	Grable received top billing for the first time
Man About Town	1939	Susan Hayes	Mark Sandrich	Jack Benny; Dorothy Lamour	
Million Dollar Legs	1939	Carol Parker	Nick Grinde	John Hartley; Donald O'Connor; Jackie Coogan; Dorothea Kent	
The Day the Bookies Wept	1939	Ina Firpo	Leslie Goodwins	Joe Penner	
Down Argentine Way	1940	Glenda Crawford; Glenda Cunningham	Irving Cummings	Don Ameche; Carmen Miranda; Charlotte Greenwood	
Tin Pan Alley	1940	Lily Blane	Walter Lang	Alice Faye; John Payne; Jack Oakie	
Moon Over Miami	1941	Kathryn 'Kay' Latimer	Walter Lang	Don Ameche; Robert Cummings; Carole Landis; Jack Haley	
A Yank in the RAF	1941	Carol Brown	Henry King	Tyrone Power	
I Wake Up Screaming	1941	Jill Lynn	H. Bruce Humberstone	Victor Mature; Carole Landis	
Song of the Islands	1942	Eileen O'Brien	Walter Lang	Victor Mature; Jack Oakie	
Footlight Serenade	1942	Pat Lambert	Gregory Ratoff	John Payne; Victor Mature; Jane Wyman	
Springtime in the Rockies	1942	Vicky Lane	Irving Cummings	John Payne; Carmen Miranda; Cesar Romero; Harry James	
Coney Island	1943	Kate Farley	Walter Lang	George Montgomery; Cesar Romero	
Sweet Rosie O'Grady	1943	Madeline Marlowe; Rosie O'Grady	Irving Cummings	Robert Young; Adolphe Menjou	
Four Jills in a Jeep	1944	Herself	William A. Seiter	Kay Francis; Carole Landis; Alice Faye; Martha Raye; Carmen Miranda	
Pin Up Girl	1944	Lorry Jones; Laura Lorraine	H. Bruce Humberstone	John Harvey; Martha Raye	
Billy Rose's Diamond Horseshoe	1945	Bonnie Collins	George Seaton	Dick Haymes; Phil Silvers; William Gaxton	
The Dolly Sisters	1945	Yansci 'Jenny' Dolly	Irving Cummings	John Payne; June Haver	
Do You Love Me	1946	Girl in Taxi (cameo)	Gregory Ratoff	Maureen O'Hara; Dick Haymes; Harry James	Grable had a cameo as a fan of Harry James's character
The Shocking Miss Pilgrim	1947	Cynthia Pilgrim	George Seaton	Dick Haymes; Anne Revere	
Mother Wore Tights	1947	Myrtle McKinley Burt	Walter Lang	Dan Dailey; Mona Freeman	
Hollywood Bound	1947	Various	Various	Various	Astor Pictures compilation of three 1930s RKO short subjects, Ferry-Go-Round (1934), A Night at the Biltmore Bowl (1935), and The Spirit of 1976 (1935).
That Lady in Ermine	1948	Francesca; Angelina	Ernst Lubitsch; Otto Preminger (uncredited)	Douglas Fairbanks, Jr.; Cesar Romero	Lubitsch died early into production.; Preminger finished the film but insisted on Lubitsch receiving full credit.
When My Baby Smiles at Me	1948	Bonny Kaye	Walter Lang	Dan Dailey; Jack Oakie; June Havoc	
The Beautiful Blonde from Bashful Bend	1949	Winifred Jones	Preston Sturges	Cesar Romero; Rudy Vallee	
Wabash Avenue	1950	Ruby Summers	Henry Koster	Victor Mature; Phil Harris	Remake of Grable's earlier hit Coney Island
My Blue Heaven	1950	Kitty Moran	Henry Koster	Dan Dailey; David Wayne; Jane Wyatt; Mitzi Gaynor	
Call Me Mister	1951	Kay Hudson	Lloyd Bacon	Dan Dailey; Danny Thomas	Remake of Grable's earlier hit A Yank in the RAF
Meet Me After the Show	1951	Delilah Lee	Richard Sale	Macdonald Carey; Rory Calhoun; Eddie Albert	
The Farmer Takes a Wife	1953	Molly Larkins	Henry Levin	Dale Robertson; Thelma Ritter	
How to Marry a Millionaire	1953	Loco Dempsey	Jean Negulesco	Marilyn Monroe; Lauren Bacall	
Three for the Show	1955	Julie Lowndes	H.C. Potter	Jack Lemmon; Marge Champion; Gower Champion	
How to Be Very, Very Popular	1955	Stormy Tornado	Nunnally Johnson	Sheree North; Robert Cummings; Charles Coburn; Tommy Noonan	

=== Box Office ranking ===
For a number of years exhibitors voted Grable among the most popular stars in the country in the Quigley Moving Picture Poll.

- 1941 – 16th (US)
- 1942 – 8th (US)
- 1943 – 1st (US), 5th (UK international stars)
- 1944 – 4th (US), 2nd (UK international stars)
- 1945 – 4th (US), 6th (UK international stars)
- 1946 – 9th (US)
- 1947 – 2nd (US)
- 1948 – 2nd (US)
- 1949 – 7th (US), 10th (UK international stars)
- 1950 – 4th (US)
- 1951 – 3rd (US)
- 1952 – 20th (US)

=== Short subjects ===
- Crashing Hollywood (1931) — Frances Dean
- Ex-Sweeties (1931)
- Once a Hero (1931)
- Lady! Please! (1932)
- Hollywood Luck (1932)
- The Flirty Sleepwalker (1932)
- Hollywood Lights (1932)
- Over the Counter (1932)
- Air Tonic (1933)
- School for Romance (1934)
- Love Detectives (1934)
- Elmer Steps Out (1934)
- Business Is a Pleasure (1934)
- Susie's Affairs (1934)
- Ferry-Go-Round (1934)
- This Band Age (1935)
- The Spirit of 1976 (1935)
- A Night at the Biltmore Bowl (1935)
- Drawing Rumors (1935)
- A Quiet Fourth (1935)
- Screen Snapshots Series 15, No. 11 (1936)
- Sunkist Stars at Palm Springs (1936)
- Screen Snapshots Series 16, No. 7 (1937)
- Screen Snapshots Series 16, No. 10 (1937)
- Screen Snapshots Series 18, No. 4 (1938)
- Hedda Hopper's Hollywood No. 1 (1941)
- The All-Star Bond Rally (1945)
- Hollywood Park (1946)
- Screen Snapshots: Hollywood Shower of Stars (1955)

=== Stage work ===
- Du Barry Was a Lady (1939)
- Guys and Dolls (1962; 1968)
- Hello, Dolly! (1965–1967)
- Born Yesterday (1968–1970; 1973)
- Belle Starr (1969)

== Gallery ==
Images of Betty Grable in film

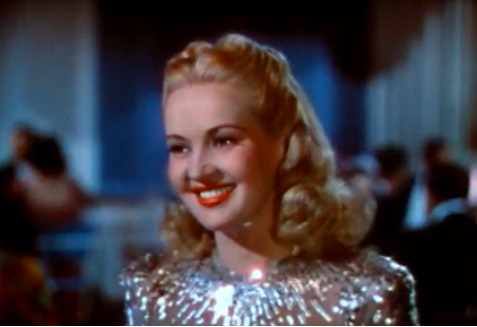
Down Argentine Way (1940)

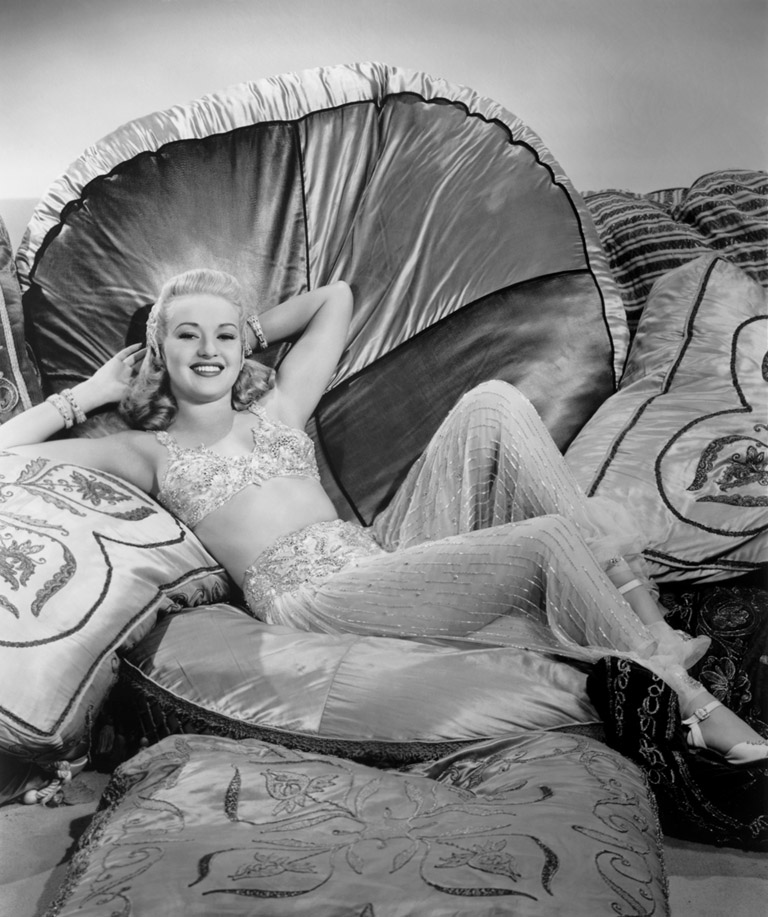
Tin Pan Alley (1940)

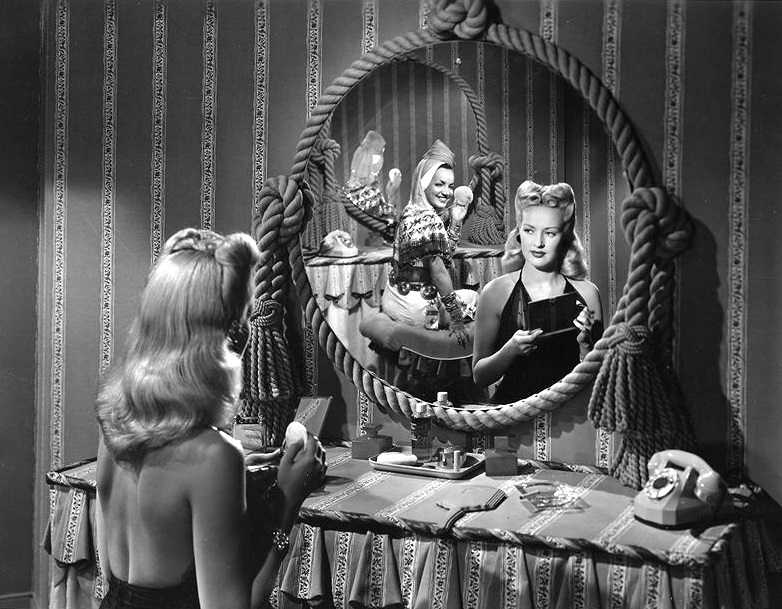
Carmen Miranda and Grable in
Springtime in the Rockies (1942)

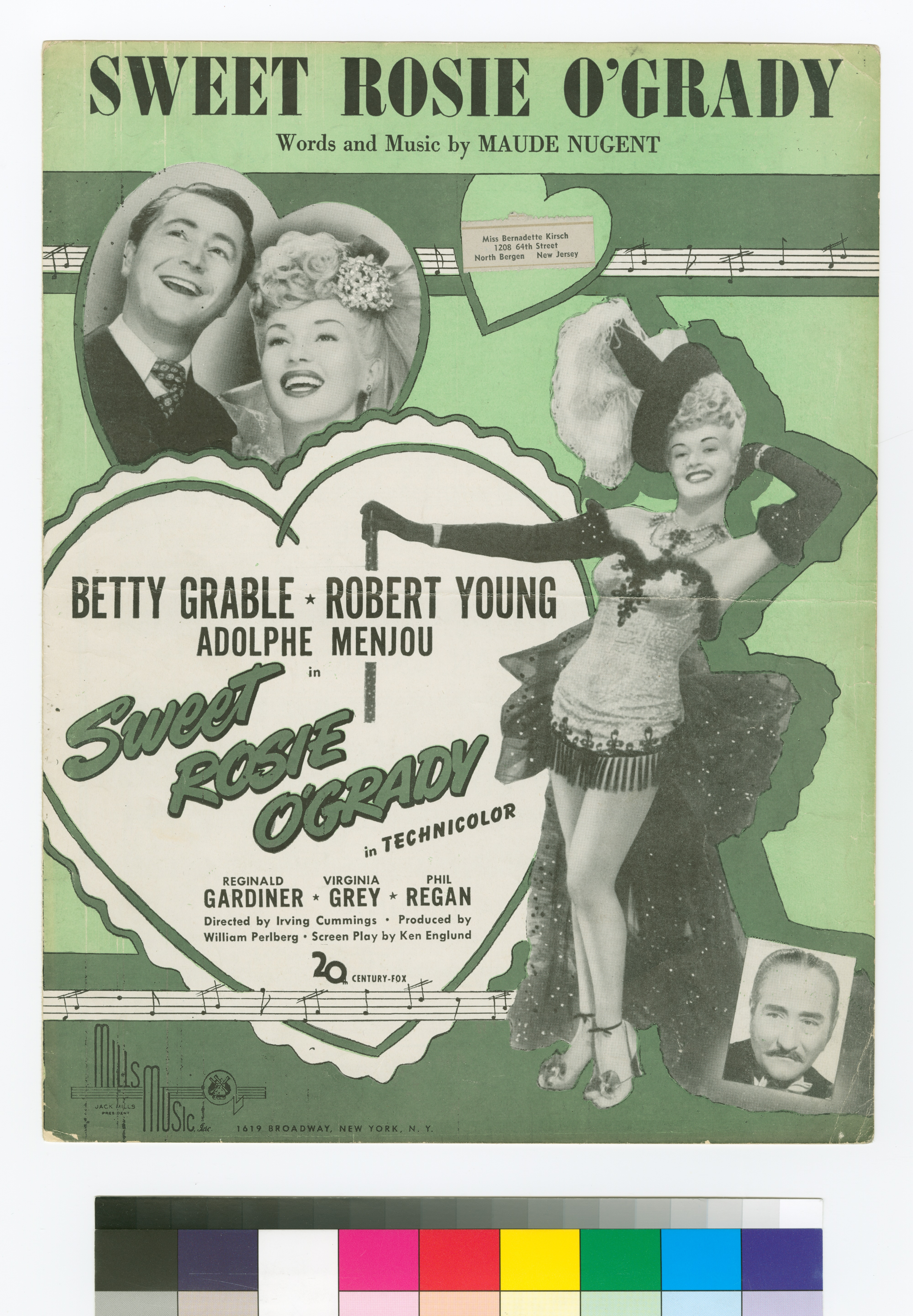
Sweet Rosie O'Grady (1943)

Marilyn Monroe (left), Grable (middle), and Lauren Bacall (right) in How to Marry a Millionaire (1953)
