= Queenie of Hollywood =

1931 film

- Directed by: Fatty Arbuckle (as William Goodrich)
- Written by: Ernest Pagano; Jack Townley
- Starring: Virginia Brooks
- Release date: November 8, 1931
- Running time: 20 minutes
- Country: United States
- Language: English

Queenie of Hollywood is a 1931 American comedy film directed by Fatty Arbuckle. It is the fourth in the "Hollywood Girls" series, after Three Hollywood Girls (1931), Crashing Hollywood (1931) and The Lure of Hollywood (1931). In this film, "the girls get employment as chambermaids at a plush Hollywood hotel," and a misunderstanding involving a dog named Queenie follows.

== Cast ==
- Virginia Brooks
- Rita Flynn
- Jeanne Farrin
- Frances Dean (Betty Grable)
- Jean Reno
- Fern Emmett
- Lynton Brent
- Clarence Nordstrom
- Queenie the Dog as Queenie

== See also ==
- Fatty Arbuckle filmography
