= Crashing Hollywood =

Crashing Hollywood may refer to:

- Crashing Hollywood (1931 film), a film directed by Fatty Arbuckle
- Crashing Hollywood (1938 film), a film directed by Lew Landers
