= Hollywood Bound =

1946 American musical comedy film

- Directed by: Sam White; Alf Goulding; Leigh Jason
- Written by: Joseph A. Fields; John Grey; Ernest Pagano; Leigh Jason
- Produced by: Carl Laemmle
- Starring: Betty Grable
- Cinematography: Harold Wenstrom; Nicholas Musuraca; J. Roy Hunt
- Edited by: John Lockert; Edward Mann
- Music by: Roy Webb; Maurice de Packh
- Production company: Astor Pictures
- Release date: 1946 (US)
- Running time: 61 minutes
- Country: United States
- Language: English

Hollywood Bound is a 1946 American musical comedy film directed by Sam White, Alf Goulding, and Leigh Jason, from a screenplay written by Joseph A. Fields, John Grey, Ernest Pagano, and Leigh Jason. The film stars Betty Grable and is the compilation of three short films made by Grable over a decade earlier: "Ferry-Go-Round" in 1934, and "A Night at the Biltmore Bowl" and "The Spirit of 1976", both in 1935.

== Cast ==
=== "Ferry-Go-Round" ===
- Betty Grable
- Gene Austin
- Candy and Coco
- Incy a dog
- Eddie Borden
- Bill Augustine
- Nora Cecil
- Max Wagner
- Jack McGuire
- Frank O'Connor
- Raquel Davido
- John Ardizoni
- John Murphy
- Joe Young
- John Millerta
- Taylor Twins

=== "A Night at the Biltmore Bowl" ===
- Betty Grable
- Jimmy Grier
- Joy Hodges
- Grady Sutton
- Lucille Ball
- Jeanie Roberts
- Jane Hamilton
- Maxine Jennings

=== "The Spirit of 1976" ===
- Betty Grable
- Walter Woolf King
- Otto Fries
- Martin Cichy
- Budd Fine
- Ivor McFadden
- Robert Graves
- Monte F. Collins
- Bill O'Donnell
- Arthur Thalasso
- Franklyn Farnum
- Nelson McDowell
- Jack Raymond
- Roger Joseph
