= Moonlight and Cactus =

Moonlight and Cactus can refer to:

- Moonlight and Cactus (1932 film), a 1932 American film
- Moonlight and Cactus (1944 film), a 1944 American film
