= Police Bullets =

1942 film by Jean Yarbrough

- Theatrical release poster
- Directed by: Jean Yarbrough
- Screenplay by: Edmond Kelso; Ande Lamb
- Story by: Ande Lamb
- Produced by: Lindsley Parsons
- Starring: Joan Marsh; John Archer; Milburn Stone; Warren Hymer; Tris Coffin; Fern Emmett
- Cinematography: Mack Stengler
- Edited by: Jack Ogilvie
- Production company: Monogram Pictures
- Distributed by: Monogram Pictures
- Release date: September 25, 1942
- Running time: 61 minutes
- Country: United States
- Language: English

Police Bullets is a 1942 American crime film directed by Jean Yarbrough and written by Edmond Kelso and Ande Lamb. The film stars Joan Marsh, John Archer, Milburn Stone, Warren Hymer, Tris Coffin and Fern Emmett. The film was released by Monogram Pictures on September 25, 1942.

== Cast ==
- Joan Marsh as Donna Wells
- John Archer as Prof. J. Thomas Quincy
- Milburn Stone as Johnny Reilly
- Warren Hymer as Gabby Walsh
- Tris Coffin as Slater
- Fern Emmett as Mrs. Bowser
- Ann Evers as Milly
- Charles Judels as Duke Talbot
- Pat Gleason as Louie Pozowicz
- Gene O'Donnell as Monk
- Charlie Hall as Rabbit
- Billy Griffith as Professor Dinwiddle
- Ben Taggart as W. A. Barlow
- Irving Mitchell as Bob 'Pops' Wilson
