= Rita Flynn =

American actress (1905–1973)

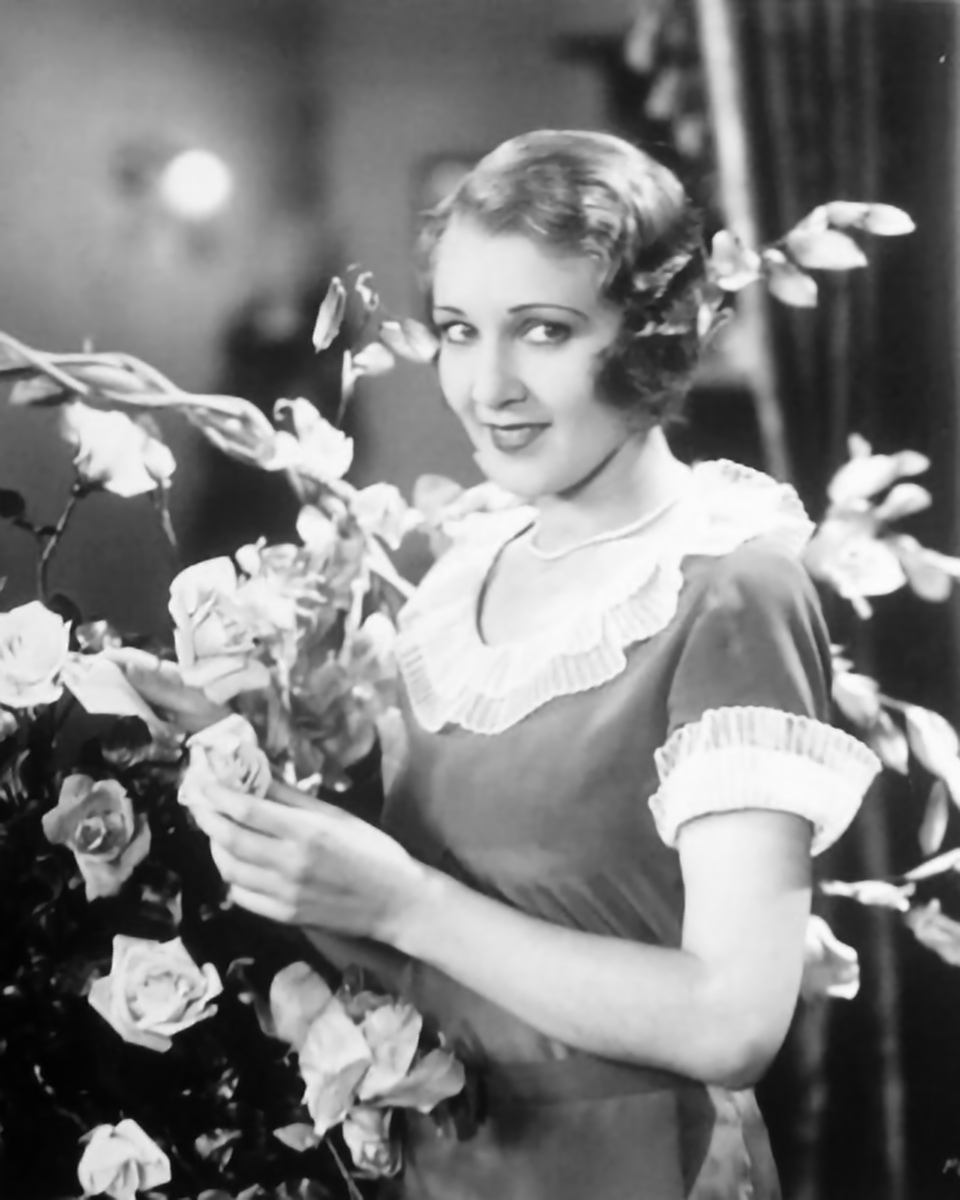
- Flynn in The Public Enemy (1931)
- Born: Edith Flynn; August 16, 1905; Tucson, Arizona, U.S.
- Died: December 31, 1973 (aged 68); Los Angeles, California, U.S.
- Other names: Mickey Flynn
- Occupation: Actress
- Years active: 1928–1933
- Spouse: McKinley Bryant (m. 1933–1941)

Rita Flynn (born Edith Flynn; August 16, 1905 – December 31, 1973) was an American film actress. She starred in Fatty Arbuckle comedies and appeared alongside James Cagney and Jean Harlow in The Public Enemy (1931).

== Early life ==
She was born as Edith Flynn on August 16, 1905. Flynn was Miss San Francisco at the Atlantic City All-American beauty pageant in 1925. From then, she became a theater performer and was known as Mickey Flynn.

== Career ==
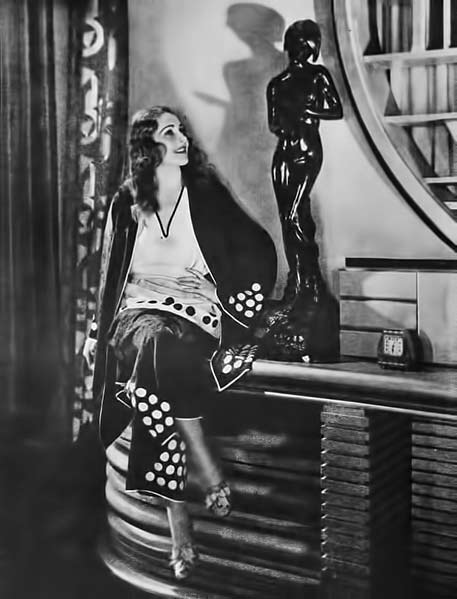
Flynn in 1930

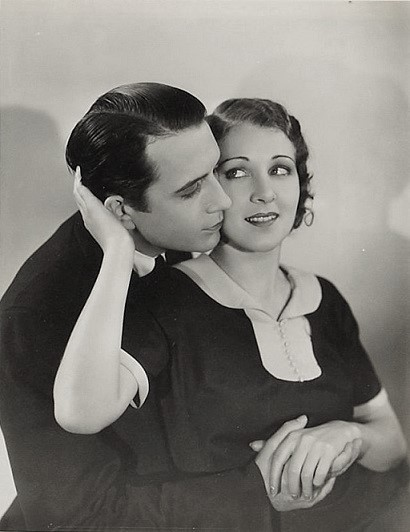
Donald Cook and Rita Flynn in The Public Enemy (1931)

Flynn began her stage career in a New York musical comedy, receiving a favorable reception from Broadway critics. She later left theater to become a film actress around 1929 when sound film became popular. Believing her theater monicker was not "ritzy enough" for film work, upon signing a contract with First National Pictures in 1929, she insisted from that point that she would identify as Rita Flynn.

Among her earliest film work was as a chorus girl in the 1929 films Broadway and Fast Life. After receiving much attention for her part in the musical The Girl from Woolworth's, she got more prominent roles in the 1930 films Sweet Mama and Top Speed. Flynn was the headline act in the Hollywood Girls short films, including The Lure of Hollywood and Hollywood Luck, being the only member of the original trio of girls to appear in the entire run. She left show business in 1933.

== Personal life ==
Flynn was reportedly set to marry Pat Rooney III in 1929, son of the actor, according to a report by the Oakland Tribune in February 1929.

In 1931, Flynn was expecting to marry David Coplin, a wealthy Los Angeles stockbroker, however Coplin was not seeking marriage, instead just companionship. In filing court papers, Flynn said that she experienced "untold humiliation and loss of reputation" as she gave up her career and hurriedly travelled to New York in anticipation of marriage. In his own defence, Coplin alluded to a discovery he made relating to affairs with other men that Flynn had been involved with. Flynn went before the Supreme Court of the United States in December 1932 seeking emotional damages of $250,000.

She married McKinley Bryant, a millionaire racer, in November 1933 in New York. She was given away by film producer Joseph M. Schenck. The couple quietly divorced in 1941.

=== Death ===
Flynn died on December 31, 1973, in Los Angeles.

== Filmography ==
- My Man (1928)
- Broadway (1929)
- Fast Life (1929)
- The Girl from Woolworth's (1929)
- Lord Byron of Broadway (1930)
- Top Speed (1930)
- Be Yourself! (1930)
- Sweet Mama (1930)
- The Cisco Kid (1931)
- The Public Enemy (1931)
- Crashing Hollywood (1931)
- The Lure of Hollywood (1931)
- Queenie of Hollywood (1931)
- Three Hollywood Girls (1931)
- Hollywood Lights (1932)
- Hollywood Luck (1932)
