= Smart Work =

1931 film

- Directed by: Fatty Arbuckle (as William Goodrich)
- Written by: Ernest Pagano; Jack Townley
- Starring: Billy Dooley; Addie McPhail
- Release date: December 27, 1931
- Country: United States
- Language: English

Smart Work is a 1931 American comedy film directed by Fatty Arbuckle and starring Billy Dooley and Addie McPhail.

== Cast ==
- Billy Dooley
- Addie McPhail

== See also ==
- Fatty Arbuckle filmography
