= The Freshman (1925 film) =

1925 film

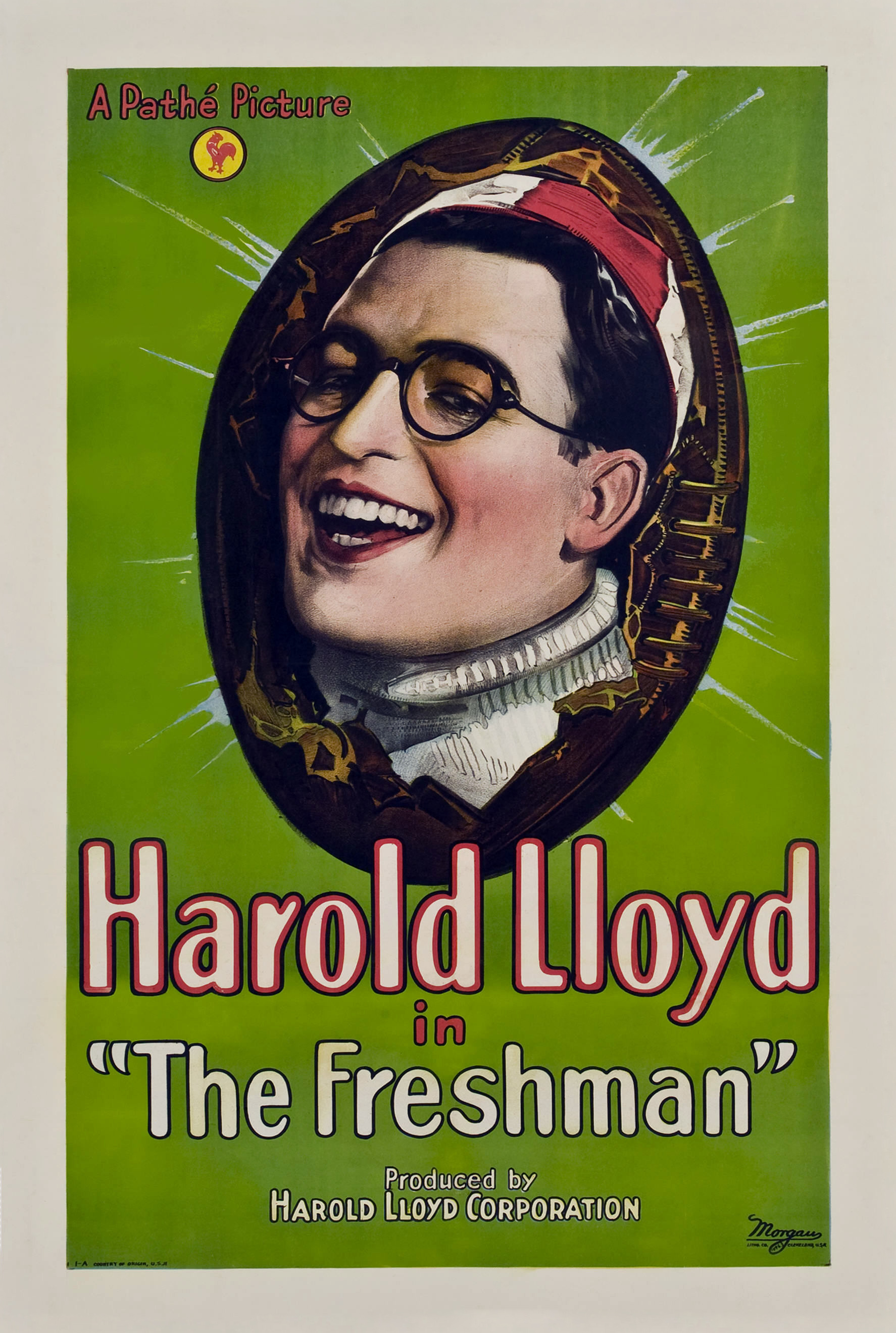
- Theatrical release one-sheet poster
- Directed by: Fred C. Newmeyer; Sam Taylor
- Written by: John Grey; Sam Taylor; Tim Whelan; Ted Wilde
- Produced by: Harold Lloyd
- Starring: Harold Lloyd; Jobyna Ralston
- Cinematography: Walter Lundin
- Edited by: Allen McNeil
- Music by: Harold Berg
- Distributed by: Pathé Exchange
- Release date: September 20, 1925
- Running time: 76 minutes
- Country: United States
- Languages: Silent; English intertitles
- Budget: $301,681
- Box office: $2.6 million

The Freshman is a 1925 American silent comedy film that tells the story of a college freshman trying to become popular by joining the school football team. It stars Harold Lloyd, Jobyna Ralston, Brooks Benedict, and James Anderson. It remains one of Lloyd's most successful and enduring films. When the film opened on September 20 at the B.S. Moss Colony Theater on Broadway, Broderick & Felsen's production of Campus Capers was the opening act which was engaged for the full ten weeks of the film's run.

The film was written by John Grey, Sam Taylor, Tim Whelan, and Ted Wilde. It was directed by Taylor and Fred C. Newmeyer.

In 1990, The Freshman was selected for preservation in the United States National Film Registry by the Library of Congress as being "culturally, historically, or aesthetically significant," added in the second year of voting and one of the first 50 films to receive the honor.

== Plot ==
The Freshman (1925)

Harold Lamb, a bright-eyed but naïve young man, enrolls at Tate University. On the train there, he meets Peggy. They are attracted to each other.

Harold decides that the best way to ensure his popularity at school is to emulate his movie idol, The College Hero, down to mimicking a little jig he does before greeting anyone, and taking his nickname, "Speedy". However, the College Cad quickly makes him the butt of an ongoing joke, of which the freshman remains blissfully unaware. Harold thinks he is popular, when in fact he is the laughingstock of the whole school. His only real friend is Peggy, who turns out to be his landlady's daughter. She is described in one of the film's title cards as "the kind of girl your mother must have been."

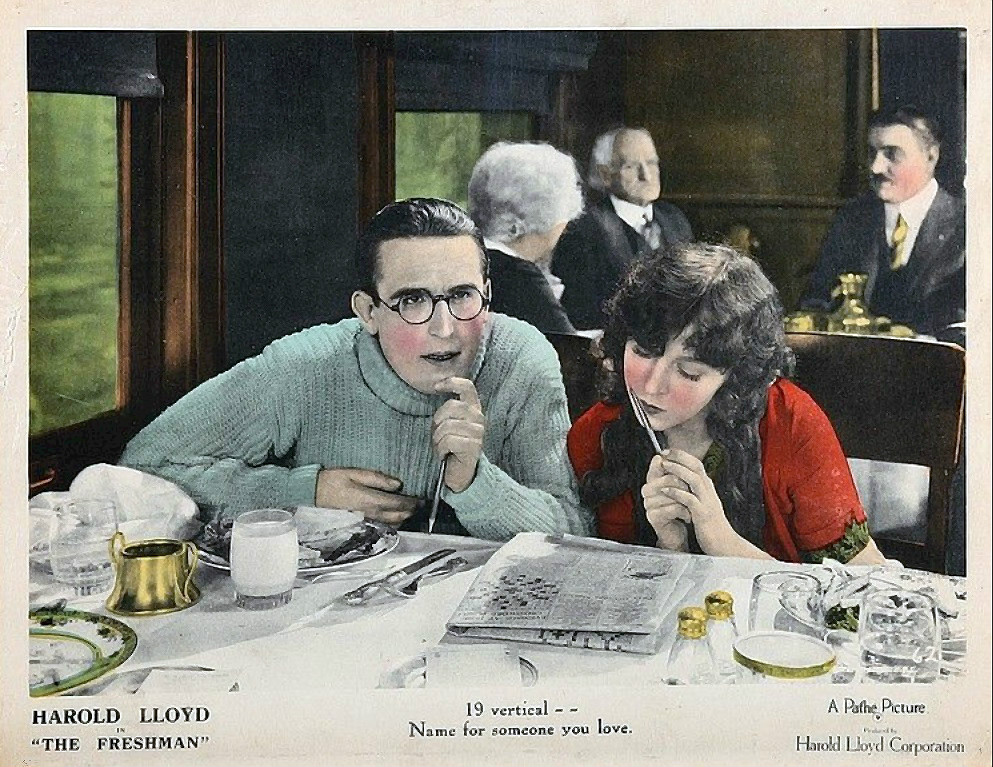
The Freshman and Peggy

He tries out for the football team. The coach is unimpressed, but as Harold has damaged their only practice tackle dummy, the coach uses him in its place. At the end of practice, though, he approves of Harold's enthusiasm (undiminished after repeated tackling). The coach is about to dismiss the freshman when Chet Trask, the captain and star of the team, suggests making him their water boy, while letting him think he has made the squad.

Harold is persuaded to host the annual "Fall Frolic" dance. His tailor is late making his suit; with the dance well underway, it is barely being held together by basting stitches, but Harold puts it on and hopes for the best. During the party, his clothes start to fall apart, despite the efforts of the tailor (hiding in a side room) to effect repairs. When Harold sees the College Cad being too forward with Peggy, working as a hatcheck girl, Harold knocks him down. The incensed Cad then tells him just what everyone really thinks of him. Peggy advises him to stop putting on an act and be himself.

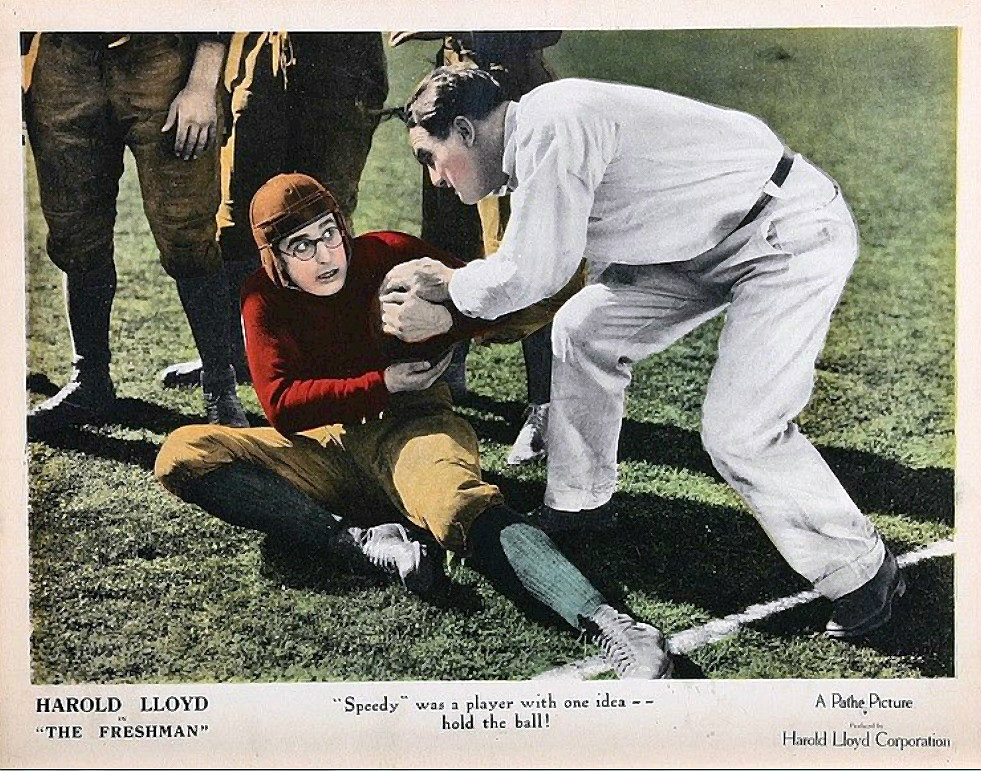
Lloyd as Harold Lamb

Harold is determined to prove himself by getting into the big football game. His chance comes when the other team proves too tough, injuring so many of Tate College's players that the coach runs out of substitutes. Hounded by Harold and warned by the referee that he will forfeit if he cannot come up with another player, the coach reluctantly lets Harold go in. The first few plays are disastrous. Finally, he breaks free and is on his way to winning the game, but, mindful of a referee's prior instruction that he is to stop playing when he hears the whistle, he drops the football just outside the end zone when a non-football whistle sounds. The other team recovers the ball with only a minute left to play. His teammates are disheartened, but Harold rouses them to make a final effort. He chases down the opposing ball carrier, knocks the football loose, scoops it up and runs it all the way back for the winning touchdown as time runs out, which at last earns him the respect and popularity he was after. To top it off, Peggy passes him a note proclaiming her love for him.

== Cast ==
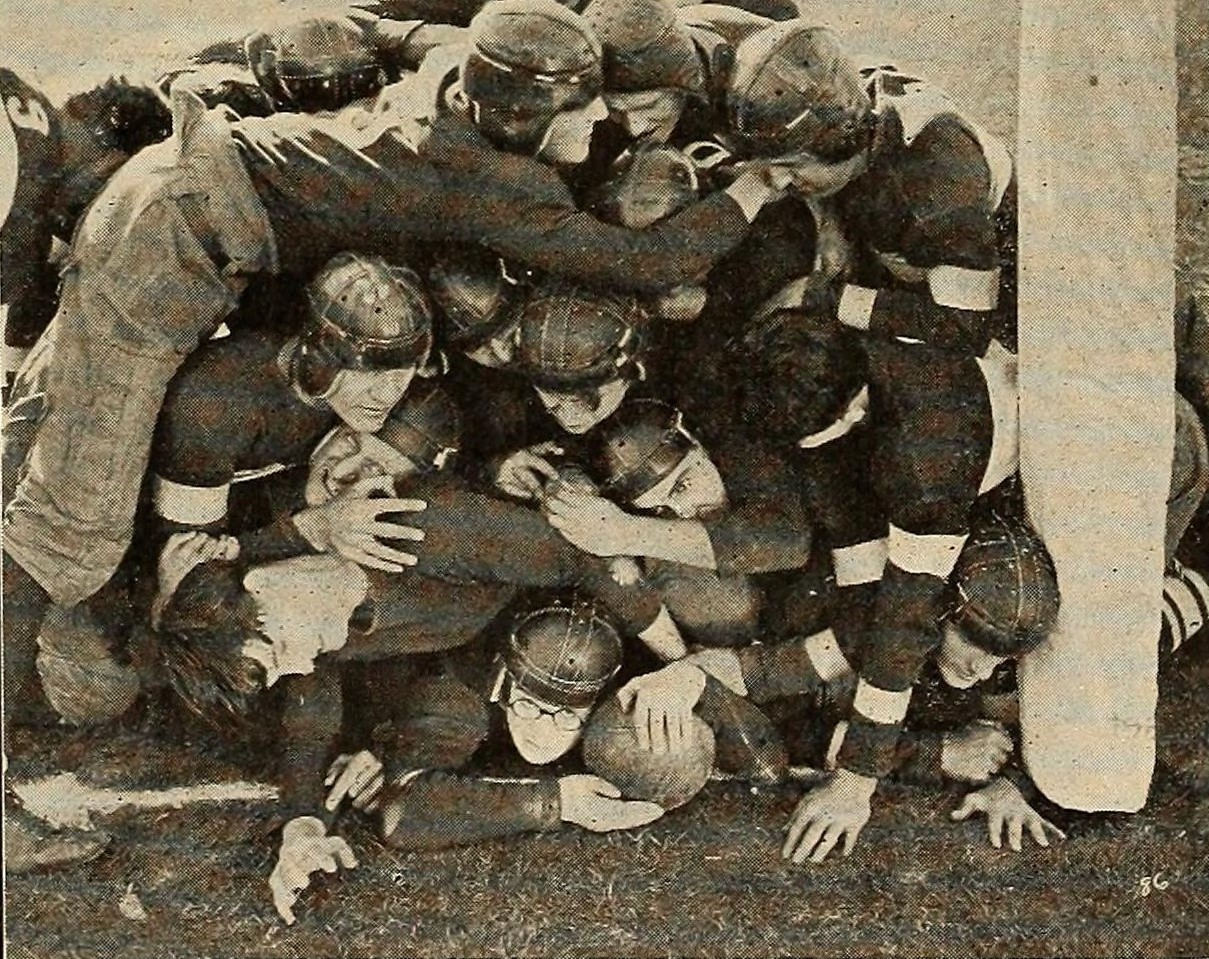
Harold Lloyd as Harold Lamb

- Harold Lloyd as The Freshman
- Jobyna Ralston as Peggy
- Pete the Pup as Himself
- Brooks Benedict as The College Cad
- James Anderson as The College Hero
- Hazel Keener as The College Belle
- Joseph Harrington as The College Tailor
- Pat Harmon as The Football Coach
- Rosalind Byrne as The Girl In Suspenders (uncredited)

== Production ==
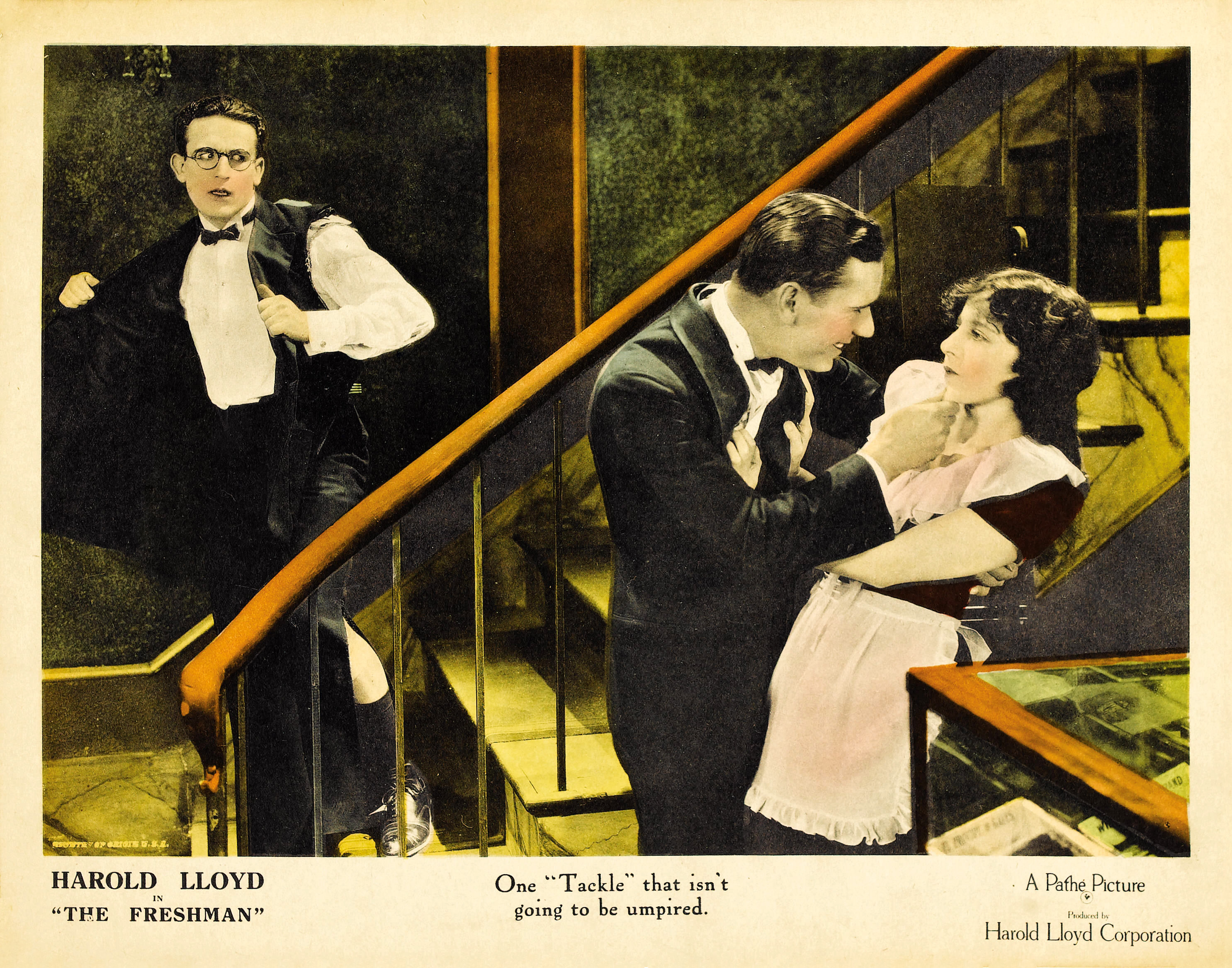
Lobby card

Train station scenes were filmed on November 12–13, 1924 at the Southern Pacific Railroad depot at Ontario, California, with a four-car train set and locomotive provided by the railroad and standing on a siding adjacent to the station. Some shots were also made in the park across the street from the depot. Some 80 cast and crew were involved at this location. Reverse angle reaction shots of the college dean were later done at the Culver City Pacific Electric depot near the film studio.

Exteriors were filmed near the USC campus in Los Angeles. The game sequence was shot on the field at the Rose Bowl, and the crowd scenes were shot at halftime at California Memorial Stadium during the November 1924 Big Game between UC Berkeley and Stanford University.

== Reception ==
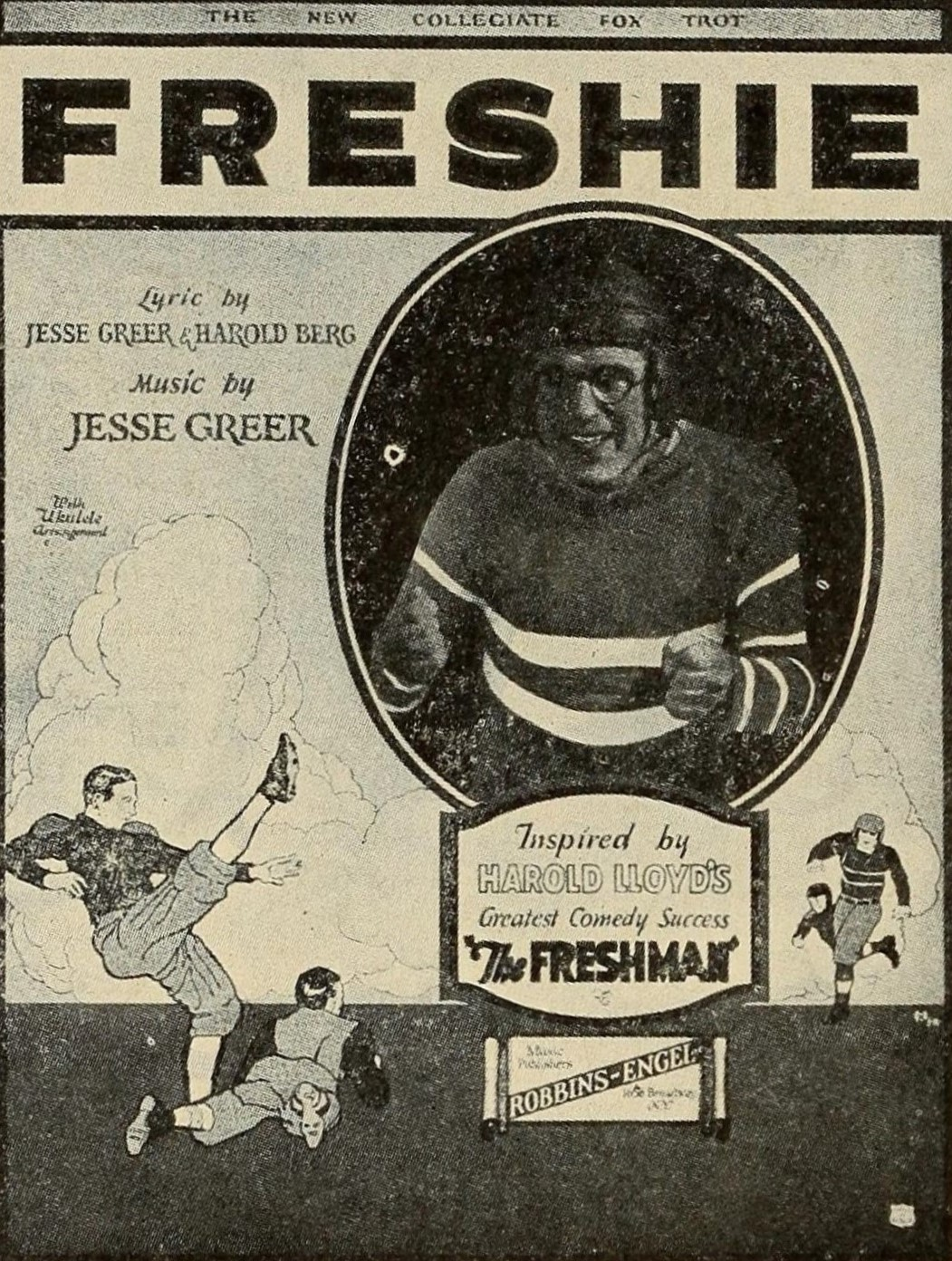
Sheet music cover of "Freshie", written by Jesse Greer to promote the film

The Freshman is widely considered one of Lloyd's most hilarious, well-constructed films and was his most successful silent film of the 1920s. Hugely popular at the time of its release, it sparked a craze for college films that lasted well beyond the 1920s. It was one of Lloyd's few films to remain widely available after the sound era, and he reissued the film (with cuts) and used extended scenes in compilation films of the 1960s. The football game sequence was reused by Lloyd and director Preston Sturges in Lloyd's last film, The Sin of Harold Diddlebock (1947).

The film was recognized by American Film Institute in the 2000 AFI's 100 Years...100 Laughs at #79.

== Copyright lawsuits ==
American humorist and author H. C. Witwer sued Lloyd in April 1929 for $2,300,000 over The Freshman, claiming that it was "pirated" from Witwer's short story "The Emancipation of Rodney", first published in 1915. When Witwer died from liver failure in Los Angeles, on August 9, 1929, the lawsuit had not been settled. Witwer's widow pursued the lawsuit and won a judgment against Lloyd in November 1930. On appeal, the United States Court of Appeals overturned the ruling and Witwer's widow received nothing.

A further lawsuit was brought in 2000 by Lloyd's granddaughter, Suzanne Lloyd Hayes, against the Walt Disney Company, alleging that elements of The Freshman were copied to the 1998 comedy The Waterboy, the US District Court in Los Angeles eventually ruled against Hayes.

== Home media ==
Criterion released The Freshman on Blu-ray and DVD on March 25, 2014.

== See also ==
- Harold Lloyd filmography
- The Sin of Harold Diddlebock
- List of American football films
