= The Lure of Hollywood =

- Directed by: Fatty Arbuckle (as William Goodrich)
- Written by: Ernest Pagano; Jack Townley
- Starring: Virginia Brooks
- Release date: July 5, 1931
- Running time: 20 minutes
- Country: United States
- Language: English

The Lure of Hollywood is a 1931 American Pre-Code comedy film directed by Fatty Arbuckle. The film is the third installment in a series of six short films titled Three Hollywood Girls. The story follows two rising stars, Rita Flynn and Phyllis Crane, who have just signed a major contract in Hollywood. Excited by their success, they decide to host a party for their friends.

== Cast ==
- Virginia Brooks
- Rita Flynn
- Phyllis Crane
- George Chandler
- Bryant Washburn

== See also ==
- Fatty Arbuckle filmography
