= Idle Roomers (1931 film) =

1931 film

- Directed by: Fatty Arbuckle (as William Goodrich)
- Written by: Ernest Pagano; Jack Townley
- Starring: Frank Molino; Alfred Molino
- Release date: November 29, 1931
- Running time: 9 minutes
- Country: United States
- Language: English

Idle Roomers is a 1931 American comedy film directed by Fatty Arbuckle, starring Frank Molino and Alfred Molino. The plot was summarized as "two acrobats are adjudged insane by their landlady," so "she sends for alienists who in their endeavor to secure case facts also perform antics."
