= The Tamale Vendor =

1931 film

- Directed by: Fatty Arbuckle (as William Goodrich)
- Written by: Ernest Pagano; Jack Townley
- Starring: Tom Patricola
- Release date: November 26, 1931
- Running time: 21 minutes
- Country: United States
- Language: English

The Tamale Vendor is a 1931 American Pre-Code comedy film directed by Fatty Arbuckle and starring Tom Patricola, Charles Judels, and Margaret Breen. In the plot, "Tom falls for a cute señorita whose father is forcing her against her will to marry a rich middle-aged Mexican."

== See also ==
- Fatty Arbuckle filmography
