= Beach Pajamas =

1931 film

- Directed by: Fatty Arbuckle (as William Goodrich)
- Written by: Fatty Arbuckle (as William Goodrich)
- Produced by: Lew Lipton
- Starring: Louis John Bartels
- Edited by: Walter Thompson
- Distributed by: RKO Radio Pictures
- Release date: September 21, 1931
- Running time: 20 minutes
- Country: United States
- Language: English

Beach Pajamas is a 1931 American Pre-Code short comedy film directed and written by Fatty Arbuckle (as William Goodrich) and starring Louis John Bartels. It was released by RKO Radio Pictures.

== Cast ==
- Louis John Bartels
- Addie McPhail
- Ena Gregory
- Charlotte Mineau
- Vernon Dent
- James Finlayson
- Charles R. Moore
- Al Thompson

== See also ==
- List of American films of 1931
- Fatty Arbuckle filmography
