= The Girl from Woolworth's =

1929 film

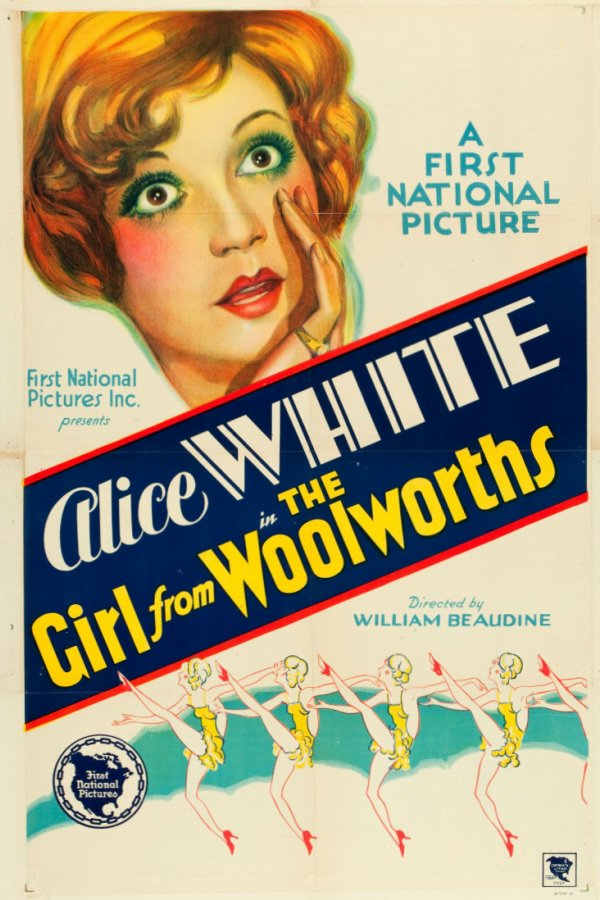
- Directed by: William Beaudine
- Written by: Adele Comandini; Richard Weil; Edward Ludwig
- Starring: Alice White; Gladden James; Bert Moorhouse; Patricia Caron
- Cinematography: Jackson Rose
- Edited by: Terry O. Morse
- Production company: First National Pictures
- Distributed by: Warner Bros. Pictures
- Release date: October 27, 1929
- Country: United States
- Language: English

The Girl from Woolworth's is a 1929 American sound (All-Talking) pre-Code musical romance film directed by William Beaudine and starring Alice White, Gladden James and Bert Moorhouse. It was released both as a sound film and in a slightly shorter silent version.

Karen Plunkett-Powell wrote in her book, Remembering Woolworth's: A Nostalgic History of the World's Most Famous Five-and-Dime: "First National Pictures produced this 60-minute musical as a showcase for up-and-coming actress Alice White." White had the role of a singing clerk in the music department of a Woolworth's store.

== Plot ==
At a lively party, Daisy King is introduced as a singer and performs a song just as Bill Harrigan arrives. Daisy makes a strong impression on Bill, but she does not pay him much attention. Bill assumes Daisy is a professional entertainer, and he tells her he's a traveling man.

The next day, Daisy and Bill meet again—this time on the subway, where Bill works as a guard. Daisy forgets her handbag on the train, and Bill, discovering from a card inside that she works as a salesgirl at Woolworth's ten-cent store, returns it to her at the counter. Touched by his gesture, Daisy agrees to go on a dinner date with him. They spend the evening at the upscale Mayfield Club. The owner, Lawrence Mayfield, notices Daisy and invites her to his office. He offers her a chance to perform at the club. Bill disapproves of the offer, but Daisy is thrilled by the prospect of stardom. That night, Bill proposes to her, but Daisy is still chasing her dreams.

Just as she accepts Bill's proposal, she receives a wire from Mayfield to report for rehearsal. Without hesitation, she rushes off to the club, leaving Bill behind. When Bill shows up looking for her, Tillie Hart, Daisy's loyal and sharp-witted roommate, explains the situation. Bill storms out angrily and heads for the club.

Tillie, realizing Bill may cause a scene, tries to call ahead but cannot get through. On her way to the club, she witnesses Bill's car crash and learns he's been taken to the hospital. She hurries to tell Daisy the news just as Daisy is about to perform her big debut. Daisy is desperate to leave, but the show must go on. She performs her number through tears—and the audience adores her.

When Daisy gets back in her dressing room, Mayfield makes an aggressive advance. He locks the door and shoves Tillie out. Just then, Bill bursts in, arm in a sling and face bandaged from the accident. He punches Mayfield with his good arm and whisks Daisy away.

"You’re all the career I want," Daisy sobs to Bill as they leave together.

== Cast ==
- Alice White as Pat King
- Charles Delaney as Bill Harigan
- Wheeler Oakman as Lawrence Mayfield
- Rita Flynn as Tillie Hart
- Gladden James as Dowling
- Bert Moorhouse as Dave
- Patricia Caron as Cleo
- William Orlamond as Pa Donnelly
- Milla Davenport as Ma Donnelly
- Ben Hall as Jerry Donelly

== Music ==
The film featured four songs with music by George W. Meyer and lyrics by Al Bryan. The songs titles are listed below:

- "Someone"
- "Oh! Oh! Oh! What I Know About Love"
- "You Baby Me, I'll Baby You"
- "Crying for Love"

== Censorship ==
The Commonwealth Film Censorship Board refused to permit the film to be released in Australia, a decision upheld by the Censor Appeals Board. At the time, approximately half of all foreign films that were submitted were rejected by the Board.

== Preservation ==
The Girl from Woolworth's is now considered to be a lost film.

== See also ==
- List of early sound feature films (1926–1929)

== Bibliography ==
- Marshall, Wendy L. William Beaudine: From Silents to Television. Scarecrow Press, 2005.
