= Up Pops the Duke =

1931 film

- Directed by: Fatty Arbuckle (as William Goodrich)
- Written by: Ernest Pagano; Jack Townley
- Produced by: Jack White
- Starring: George Chandler
- Release date: September 20, 1931
- Running time: 20 minutes
- Country: United States
- Language: English

Up Pops the Duke is a 1931 American Pre-Code comedy film directed by Fatty Arbuckle and starring George Chandler.

== Cast ==
- George Chandler
- Pauline Wagner
- Helen Bolton

== See also ==
- Fatty Arbuckle filmography
