= Addie McPhail =

American actress (1905–2003)

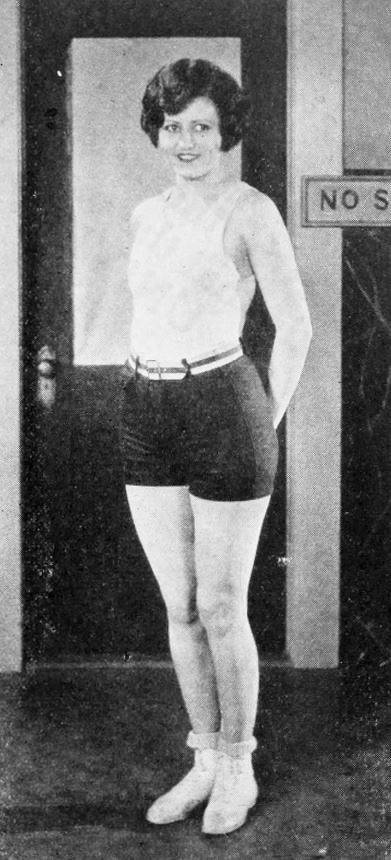
- McPhail in an issue of Universal Weekly, 1927
- Born: July 15, 1905; White Plains, Kentucky, U.S.
- Died: April 14, 2003 (aged 97); Canoga Park, California, U.S.
- Years active: 1927–1941
- Spouses: Lindsay McPhail Fatty Arbuckle (m. 1932; died 1933)
- Children: 1

Addie McPhail (July 15, 1905 – April 14, 2003) was an American film actress.

== Early years ==
McPhail was born Addie Dukes in White Plains, Kentucky, on July 15, 1905. Her parents were Van and Cordelia Dukes, and she attended schools in Madisonville and Providence, Kentucky. Her father worked in insurance, and the family often moved. They went to Chicago in 1911 and "settled for a long period". While there, she won several contests on stage. They went to Hollywood in 1925, a move that McPhail considered to be fate because she wanted to be an actress.

== Career ==
McPhail began her work in films with Stern Brothers, a studio that produced short comedies that Universal distributed. She appeared in more than 60 films between 1927 and 1941. The physical demands of comedy gradually diminished McPhail's interest in acting, and she later said, "Maybe I was never the actress I wanted to be." Her film career ended with Northwest Passage (1940).

== Personal life and death ==
McPhail's first husband was Lindsay McPhail, a pianist and songwriter with whom she had a daughter. She was the third and last wife of Roscoe "Fatty" Arbuckle. After she retired from acting, she served for 17 years as a volunteer nurse at the Motion Picture & Television Country House and Hospital in Woodland Hills, California.

McPhail died of undisclosed causes in Canoga Park, Los Angeles, California, on April 14, 2003.

== Selected filmography ==
- Anybody Here Seen Kelly? (1928) - Mrs. Hickson
- Double Whoopee (1929) - Woman applying make-up (uncredited)
- The Three Sisters (1930) - Antonia
- Night Work (1930) - Trixie
- Midnight Daddies (1930) - Trixie - Charlie's Sweetheart
- Won by a Neck (1930)
- Extravagance (1930) - Helen - Fred's Secretary (uncredited)
- Up a Tree (1930) - Addie
- Marriage Rows (1931) - Winnie
- Girls Demand Excitement (1931) - Sue Street (uncredited)
- Ex-Plumber (1931) - Addie - The Wife
- Aloha (1931) - Rosalie
- Beach Pajamas (1931)
- Corsair (1931) - Jean Phillips
- Smart Work (1931) - Billy's Wife
- Keep Laughing (1932)
- Hollywood Luck (1932)
- Merry Wives of Reno (1934) - Mrs. Dillingworth (uncredited)
- By Your Leave (1934) - Gloria Dawn (uncredited)
- Bordertown (1935) - Carter's Girl (uncredited)
- Diamond Jim (1935) - (uncredited)
- It's in the Air (1935) - (uncredited)
- Women of Glamour (1937) - Minor Role (uncredited)
- Northwest Passage (1940) - Jane Browne (uncredited)
- The Cowboy and the Blonde (1941) - Cafe Hostess (uncredited)
