= Windy Riley Goes Hollywood =

1931 film

- Lobby card
- Directed by: Roscoe Arbuckle (as William Goodrich)
- Written by: Ernest Pagano; Jack Townley
- Produced by: Jack White
- Starring: Jack Shutta; Louise Brooks
- Distributed by: Educational Pictures
- Release date: May 3, 1931
- Running time: 18 minutes
- Country: United States
- Language: English

Windy Riley Goes Hollywood is a 1931 American pre-Code short comedy film directed by Roscoe Arbuckle using the pseudonym of William Goodrich and starring Louise Brooks and Jack Shutta. Although Arbuckle was acquitted in the third trial for the death of Virginia Rappe, he could not obtain work in Hollywood under his own name, so he adopted the pseudonym William Goodrich for directing the comedy shorts he made under his contract with Educational Film Exchanges. The film is a loose adaptation of Ken Kling's comic strip Windy Riley.

== Plot ==
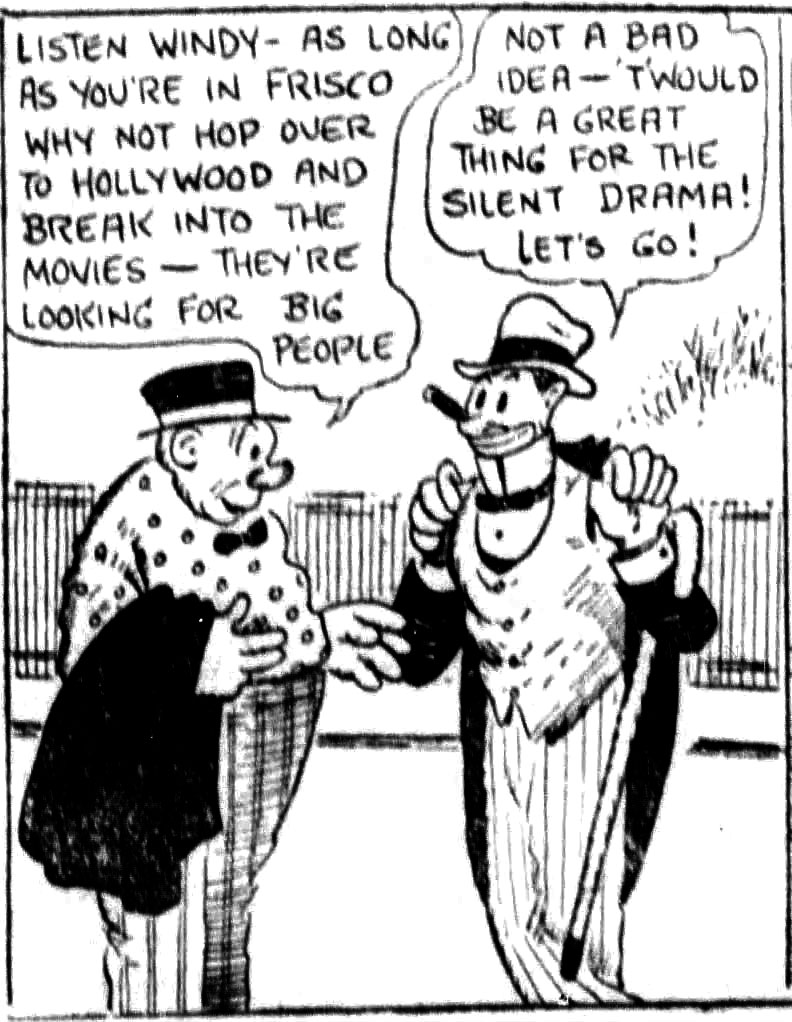
Sample of the source material, the Windy Riley comic strip

Nearing the end of a solo self-promotional cross-country road trip from New York to San Francisco, Windy Riley ends up in Hollywood by mistake due to an inadvertently turned-around sign. His car is repossessed, but the repo man gets into a car accident with a movie mogul. The repo man blames Windy, and as Windy has no money, the mogul puts him to work in his studio's publicity department.

The studio's star actress, Betty Grey, has been warned that her contract will be terminated if she gets any more bad publicity. Unaware of this, Windy kidnaps Betty's director, LaRoss, and hides him in a railroad boxcar, intending to reap some publicity (as the movie Betty is currently working on is called The Boxcar Mystery). A reporter learns that LaRoss is missing and prepares to splash the news across the front page. Windy retrieves LaRoss, who then gives the reporter a different story to print - that he and Betty are getting married. Windy goes back to New York.

== Cast ==
- Jack Shutta as Windy Riley
- Louise Brooks as Betty Grey
- William B. Davidson as Joseph La Ross
- Wilbur Mack as Walter Snell
- Dell Henderson as Allen
- Walter Merrill as Eddie Lane, Daily Tribune Reporter

== Release and reception ==
Windy Riley Goes Hollywood was first shown on television on November 18, 1948 on WJZ (Channel 7) in Asbury Park, New Jersey. The film was shown under the slightly incorrect title of Windy Riley Goes to Hollywood.

== See also ==
- Fatty Arbuckle filmography
