= That's My Meat =

1931 film

- Directed by: Fatty Arbuckle (as William Goodrich)
- Written by: John Grey; Ernest Pagano; Jack Townley
- Starring: Al St. John
- Release date: October 4, 1931
- Running time: 11 minutes
- Country: United States
- Language: English

That's My Meat is a 1931 American Pre-Code comedy film short directed by Fatty Arbuckle and starring Alfred "Al" St. John and written by Ernest Pagano, Jack Townley, and John Grey. The plot is summarized as "a hapless butcher unleases bloodhounds on would-be burglars".

== See also ==
- Fatty Arbuckle filmography
