= Charles Judels =

Dutch-American actor (1882–1969)

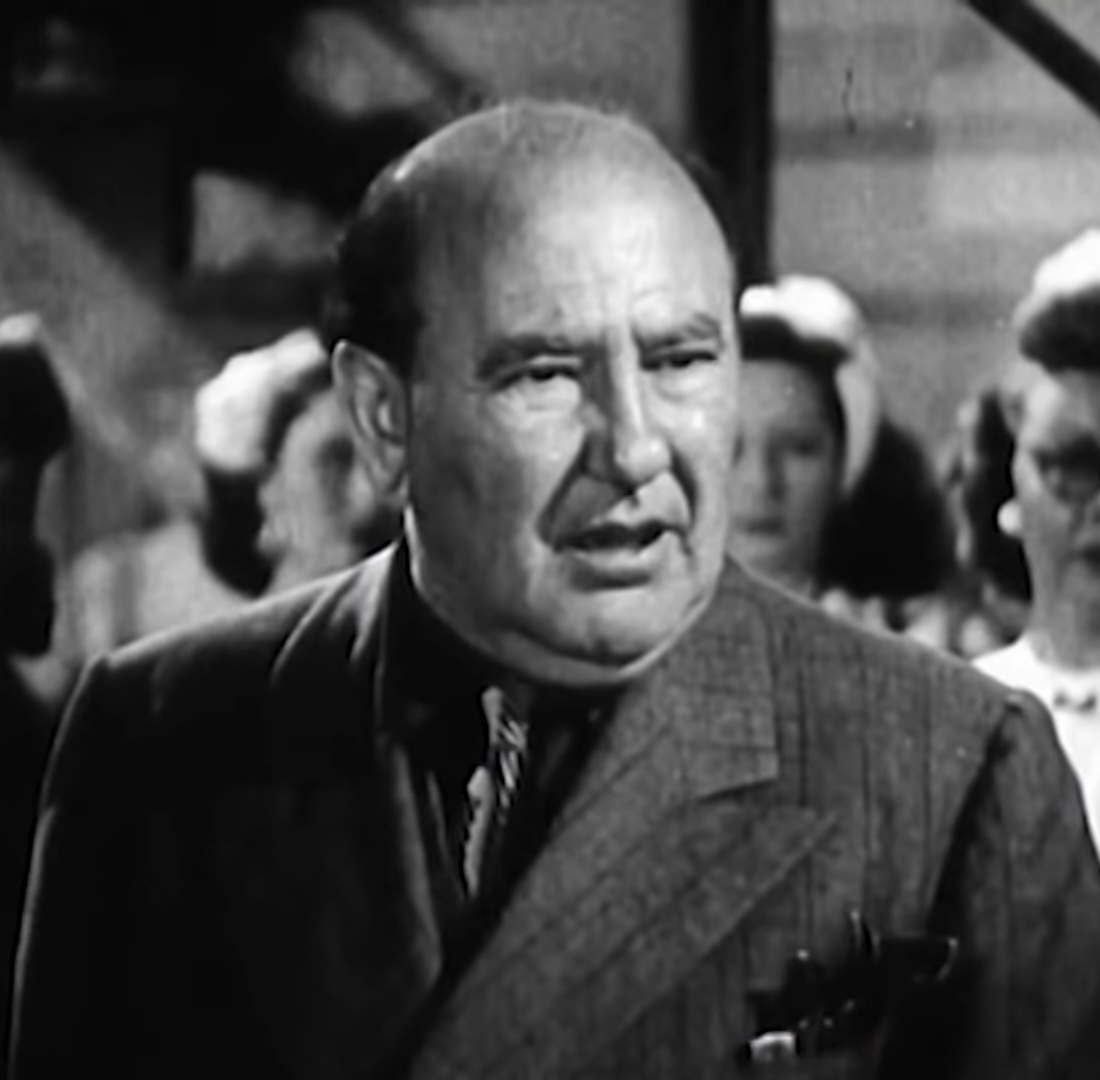
- Judels in Career Girl (1944)
- Born: August 10, 1882; Amsterdam, Netherlands
- Died: February 14, 1969 (aged 86); San Francisco, California, U.S.
- Occupation: Actor
- Years active: 1915–1954

Charles Judels (August 17, 1882 – February 14, 1969) was a Dutch-born American actor.

== Early years ==
Judels was born on August 17, 1882, in Amsterdam as a third generation in a family of actors. His granddad owned several theatres throughout the Netherlands and starred in his own plays. Judels' dad combined his love of theatre and music and was a stage manager for the Metropolitan Opera in New York for 35 years.

== Career ==
Judels appeared in more than 130 films from 1915 to 1949. In 1928, he was signed by 20th Century Fox to direct Movietone and did extensive work as a voice-over actor in animated films, including the voices of Stromboli and The Coachman in Walt Disney's Pinocchio (1940). In 1909, he became a member of The Lambs.

Judels died in San Francisco, California in 1969, aged 86.

== Selected filmography ==
- My Old Dutch (1915) – Jules Joubert
- The Commuters (1915) – Prof. Anatole 'Sammy' Vermouth
- Little Old New York (1923) – Delmonica
- Under the Red Robe (1923) – Antoine
- Frozen Justice (1929) – French Sailor
- Hot for Paris (1929) – Charlott Gouset
- Let's Go Places (1930) – Du Bonnet (uncredited)
- The Big Party (1930) – Dupuy (uncredited)
- Cheer Up and Smile (1930) – Pierre
- Oh, Sailor Behave (1930) – De Medici
- College Lovers (1930) – Spectator
- The Doorway to Hell (1930) – Florist (scenes deleted)
- The Life of the Party (1930) – Mons. LeMaire
- Captain Thunder (1930) – Commandante Ruiz
- The Easiest Way (1931) – Mr. Gensler (uncredited)
- 50 Million Frenchmen (1931) – Pernasse – Hotel Manager
- God's Gift to Women (1931) – Undertaker
- Women of All Nations (1931) – Leon (uncredited)
- Gold Dust Gertie (1931) – Monsieur Pestalozzi
- Take 'em and Shake 'em (1931, Short)
- The Tamale Vendor (1931, Short)
- Moonlight and Cactus (1932, Short)
- High Pressure (1932) – Salvatore (uncredited)
- One Hour with You (1932) – Policeman (uncredited)
- Close Relations (1933, Short) – Uncle Ezra Wart
- Tomalio (1933, Short) – The General
- The Mighty Barnum (1934) – Maitre D'Hotel
- The Night Is Young (1935) – Riccardi (uncredited)
- Symphony of Living (1935) – Rozzini
- Enchanted April (1935) – Domenico
- The Florentine Dagger (1935) – Salvatore
- King Solomon of Broadway (1935) – Hot dog man
- Give Us This Night (1936) – Second Carabiniere
- The Great Ziegfeld (1936) – Pierre
- Suzy (1936) – Producer (uncredited)
- San Francisco (1936) – Tony
- I'd Give My Life (1936)
- Mr. Cinderella (1936) – Randolph's Chef (uncredited)
- Rose Bowl (1936) – Mr. Schultz (uncredited)
- Along Came Love (1936) – Joe Jacobs
- The Plainsman (1936) – Tony – The Barber
- The Big Show (1936) – Swartz, the studio head
- Love on the Run (1936) – Lieutenant of Police
- When's Your Birthday? (1937) – Headwaiter
- Swing High, Swing Low (1937) – Tony
- Maytime (1937) – Cabby
- Song of the City (1937) – Mr. Pietro 'Papa' Romandi
- Mountain Music (1937) – Potts Show Orchestra Leader (uncredited)
- Rhythm in the Clouds (1937) – Luigi Fernando
- Marry the Girl (1937) – Andre Victor Antoine Descate
- It Can't Last Forever (1937) – Mr. Appadelius
- The Life of the Party (1937) – Maitre d'Hotel
- Wife, Doctor and Nurse (1937) – Chef
- The Bride Wore Red (1937) – Cordellera Bar Proprietor (uncredited)
- Live, Love and Learn (1937) – Pedro Felipe
- Fight for Your Lady (1937) – Felix Janos
- Ebb Tide (1937) – Port Doctor
- High Flyers (1937) – Mr. Fontaine
- You're Only Young Once (1937) – Capt. Swenson of the Shorty II
- Love and Hisses (1937) – Oscar
- Mad About Music (1938) – Conductor (uncredited)
- Reckless Living (1938) – Harry Myron
- Stolen Heaven (1938) – Huberl
- Hold That Kiss (1938) – Otto Schmidt – Landlord (uncredited)
- Swiss Miss (1938) – Cheese Factory Proprietor
- Gold Diggers in Paris (1938) – Barman (uncredited)
- Passport Husband (1938) – Captain of Busboys (uncredited)
- Flirting with Fate (1938) – Don Luis Garcia
- Idiot's Delight (1939) – Daka (uncredited)
- The Ice Follies of 1939 (1939) – Makeup Man (uncredited)
- Lady of the Tropics (1939) – Gaston Lubois (uncredited)
- Ninotchka (1939) – Pere Mathieu – Cafe Owner (uncredited)
- That's Right – You're Wrong (1939) – Luigi (uncredited)
- Henry Goes Arizona (1939) – The Great Beldini (uncredited)
- Balalaika (1939) – Batoff (uncredited)
- Pinocchio (1940) – Stromboli & The Coachman (voice, uncredited)
- Strange Cargo (1940) – Renard (uncredited)
- Viva Cisco Kid (1940) – Don Pancho
- It All Came True (1940) – Henri Pepi de Bordeau
- On Their Own (1940) – Giuseppe Galentoni
- Florian (1940) – Editor
- Gold Rush Maisie (1940) – Hula Paradise Cafe owner
- Girl from Avenue A (1940) – Waiter (uncredited)
- Stranger on the Third Floor (1940) – Nick Nanbajan – Cafe Owner (uncredited)
- Hired Wife (1940) – Photographer (uncredited)
- Public Deb No. 1 (1940) – Ivan
- Down Argentine Way (1940) – Dr. Arturo Padilla
- The Villain Still Pursued Her (1940) – M. Dubois – Pie Vendor
- Bitter Sweet (1940) – Herr Wyler
- Cheers for Miss Bishop (1941) – Cecco
- I'll Wait for You (1941) – A. Bardosch, Nightclub Owner (uncredited)
- Blondie in Society (1941) – Julie's Owner (uncredited)
- Sweetheart of the Campus (1941) – Tomasso aka Victor Demond
- This Woman Is Mine (1941) – Cafe Proprietor
- Law of the Tropics (1941) – Captain of River Boat
- The Chocolate Soldier (1941) – Klementov
- Kathleen (1941) – Manager
- A Close Call for Ellery Queen (1942) – Corday
- Tortilla Flat (1942) – Joe Machado (uncredited)
- I Married an Angel (1942) – Customs Officer (uncredited)
- Baby Face Morgan (1942) – 'Deacon' Davis
- Police Bullets (1942) – Duke Talbot
- Der Fuehrer's Face (1943) – Off-stage Nazi (voice, uncredited)
- Education for Death (1943) – Adolf Hitler (voice, uncredited)
- American Empire (1943) – Storekeeper (uncredited)
- The Hard Way (1943) – Mr. Flores (uncredited)
- Kid Dynamite (1943) – Nick – Pool Hall Owner
- Something to Shout About (1943) – Brother Hunkafer (uncredited)
- Swing Your Partner (1943) – Digby
- Du Barry Was a Lady (1943) – Innkeeper (uncredited)
- I Dood It (1943) – Stage Manager
- Northern Pursuit (1943) – Nick – Barber (uncredited)
- Career Girl (1944) – Felix Black
- Knickerbocker Holiday (1944) – Renasaler (uncredited)
- Broadway Rhythm (1944) – Swami (uncredited)
- Kismet (1944) – Wealthy Merchant (uncredited)
- A Bell for Adano (1945) – Afronti (uncredited)
- Sunbonnet Sue (1945) – Milano
- Whistle Stop (1946) – Sam Veech
- Tangier (1946) – Dimitri
- The Hoodlum Saint (1946) – Captain of Waiters (scenes deleted)
- In Old Sacramento (1946) – Tony Marchetti
- Her Adventurous Night (1946) – Petrucci
- Plainsman and the Lady (1946) – Manuel Lopez
- The Mighty McGurk (1947) – First Brewer
- I Wonder Who's Kissing Her Now (1947) – Herman Bartholdy (uncredited)
- Panhandle (1948) – Botticelli the Barber
- Samson and Delilah (1949) – Danite Merchant (uncredited)
- Casey Bats Again (1954) – Narrator, final role
- Once Upon a Studio (2023) - Stromboli (voice, archival recordings)
