= Dorothy Granger =

American actress (1911–1995)

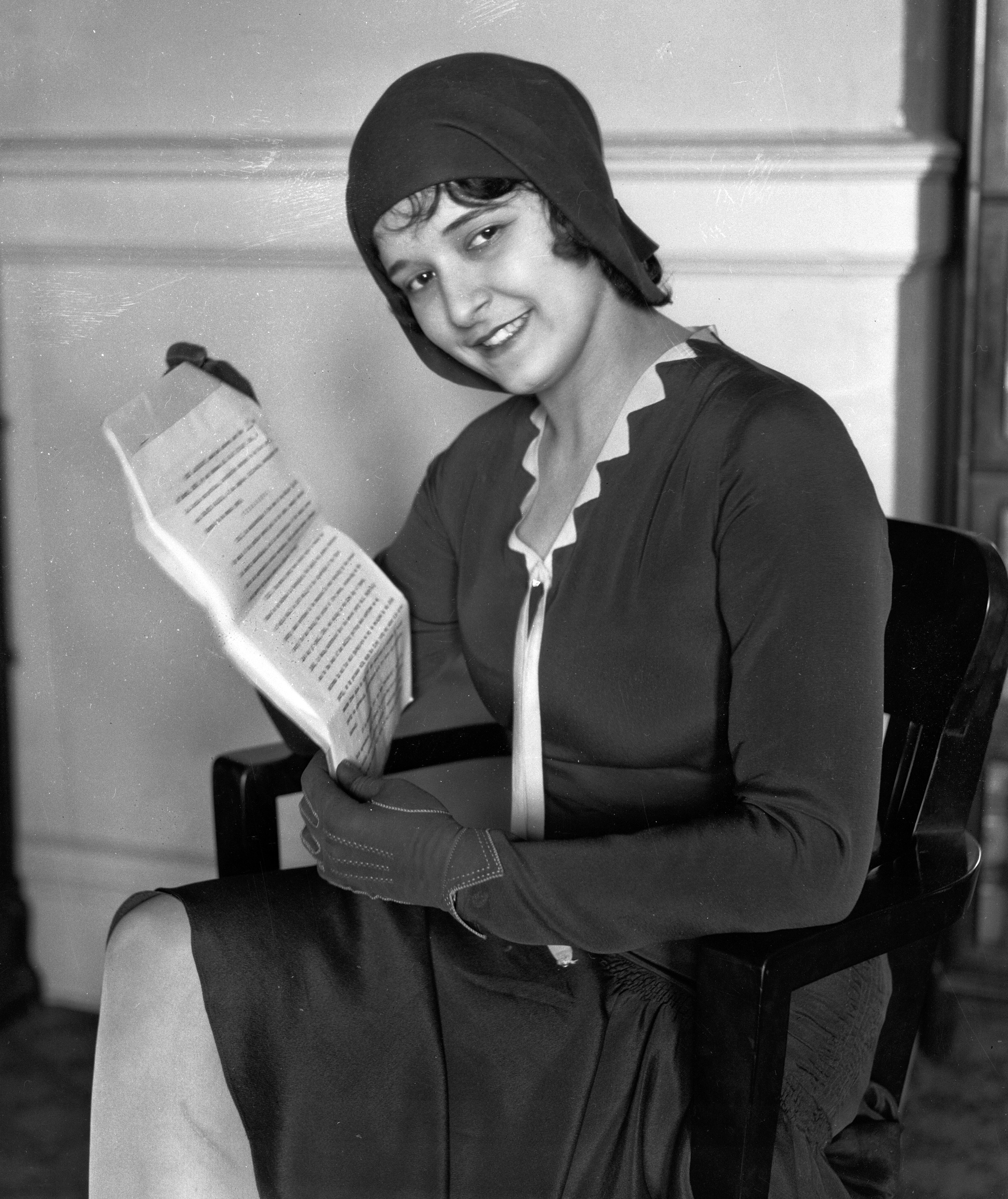
- Dorothy Granger in 1930, with her contract from Hal Roach Studios
- Born: November 21, 1911; New London, Ohio, U.S.
- Died: January 4, 1995 (aged 83); Los Angeles, California, U.S.
- Years active: 1929–1961
- Spouse: John Hilder (m. 1947)
- Children: Anthony J. Hilder (step-son)

Dorothy Karolyn Granger (November 21, 1911 – January 4, 1995) was an American actress best known for her roles in short subject comedies in Hollywood.

== Career ==
Granger, with her parents, two brothers, Richard and James, and their grandmother, Clara (née Wilcox) Granger, moved to Los Angeles during the late 1920s.

Granger got her start in the entertainment industry when she won a beauty contest at the age of 13 at Silver Beach Summer Resort near Houston. Her budding figure and confident stage presence were perfect for studios that made comedy shorts. In 1930, her father took her to producer Hal Roach, who was then testing talent for his upcoming comedy series, The Boy Friends.

Granger’s natural comedy timing got her the job immediately and she was placed under contract to Hal Roach Studios. She became a charter member of the two-reel-comedy community, appearing opposite many major comedians at Roach, Mack Sennett, Educational Pictures, Columbia Pictures, and RKO Radio Pictures. Among her famous credits are Hog Wild with Laurel & Hardy, The Dentist with W.C. Fields, Punch Drunks and Termites of 1938 with The Three Stooges. Granger also appeared with Andy Clyde, Charley Chase, Edgar Kennedy, Harry Langdon, Gus Schilling & Richard Lane, and Joe DeRita, as well as on live television with Abbott & Costello. Granger is best remembered as the sarcastic, suspicious wife in Leon Errol's series of two-reelers for RKO.

For her body of work in two-reelers, Granger was known as the "Queen of the Short Subject Films". However, she also appeared in about 100 feature films, including Frisco Jenny, Sunset in El Dorado, Kentucky Kernels, Dick Tracy vs. Cueball, Diamond Jim, and Show Boat.

== Later years ==
Granger worked on a variety of television shows through the 1950s, including The Abbott and Costello Show, I Married Joan, Father Knows Best, Topper, Lassie, Death Valley Days and Wells Fargo. Her last television performance was a live show on Face The Facts in 1961. Granger left show business in 1963, calling it an “ulcer factory.”

Granger made her last public appearance in 1993 for the Screen Actors Guild’s 60th anniversary celebration. She was an honored guest at the celebration because she was one of SAG’s first members. In later years she helped her husband run an upholstery shop in Los Angeles.

She was the stepmother of film maker and former record producer Anthony J. Hilder.

== Death ==
Granger died of cancer on January 4, 1995, aged 83, in Los Angeles, California.

== Selected filmography ==
- Words and Music (1929) Bit Part (uncredited)
- The Sophomore (1929) as Co-Ed (uncredited)
- Dance Hall (1929) as Dancer (uncredited)
- Hog Wild (1930, Short) as Tillie - The Hardys' Maid / Girl Lifting Her Skirt by Puddle (uncredited)
- The Laurel-Hardy Murder Case (1930, Short) as Young Relative (uncredited)
- Noche de duendes (1930) as La mujer furiosa (uncredited)
- Garde la bombe (1930)
- Primrose Path (1931) as Rita Johnson
- Behind Office Doors (1931) as Girl in Duneen's Apartment (uncredited)
- Goldie (1931) as Nanette, Girl in Cafe (uncredited)
- Politics (1931) as Newlywed (uncredited)
- Honeymoon Trio (1931, Short) as The Newlywed Wife
- The Tip-Off (1931) as Hatcheck Girl (uncredited)
- One Quiet Night (1931, Short)
- One Good Turn (1931, Short) as A Community Player (uncredited)
- Under Eighteen (1931) as Penthouse Party Guest (uncredited)
- Temptation's Workshop (1932) as Vi Rantler
- The Fighting Fool (1932) as Nina
- Keep Laughing (1932, Short)
- A Woman Commands (1932) as Party Girl (uncredited)
- The Beast of the City (1932) as Drunken Girl Singing at Party (uncredited)
- Night World (1932) as Bit (uncredited)
- Madison Square Garden (1932) as Vita-Life Rejuvenator Demonstrator (uncredited)
- Afraid to Talk (1932) as Kippie - Party Girl (uncredited)
- The Sign of the Cross (1932) (uncredited)
- The Dentist (1932, Short) as Miss Peppitone - Patient
- The Candid Camera (1932, short) as Mrs. Jack Towne
- Frisco Jenny (1932) as Hortense, Pickpocket (uncredited)
- Back Street (1932)
- Second Hand Wife (1933) as Bit (uncredited)
- He Learned About Women (1933) Minor Role (uncredited)
- He Couldn't Take It (1933) as Grace Clarice
- Love, Honor, and Oh Baby! (1933) as Mrs. Brown
- Only Yesterday (1933) as Sally (uncredited)
- Marriage on Approval (1933) as Hortense Bailey
- King for a Night (1933) as Dora
- Nana (1934) Minor Role (uncredited)
- Hips, Hips, Hooray! (1934) as Miss Cole - Stenographer (uncredited)
- I'll Tell the World (1934) as Brown's Girlfriend - the Dancer
- Punch Drunks (1934, Short) as Girl
- The Merry Widow (1934) as Maxim's Girl (uncredited)
- Kentucky Kernels (1934) as Ethel - Baxter's Secretary (uncredited)
- Two Heads on a Pillow (1934)
- Marriage on Approval (1934)
- Vanessa: Her Love Story (1935) as Herries Servant (uncredited)
- I've Been Around (1935) as Girl
- Naughty Marietta (1935) Minor Role (uncredited)
- Manhattan Butterfly (1935) as Nina Malone
- The Affair of Susan (1935) as Girl in Candy Shop (uncredited)
- Diamond Jim (1935) as Chorine (uncredited)
- The Ex-Mrs. Bradford (1936) as Fill-in Receptionist (uncredited)
- Show Boat (1936) as New Year's Eve Cutie (uncredited)
- Romeo and Juliet (1936) Minor Role (uncredited)
- Camille (1936) as Raucous Party Girl (uncredited)
- The Road Back (1937) as French Girl (uncredited)
- Prescription for Romance (1937) as Cashier (uncredited)
- Termites of 1938 (1937, Short) as Mrs. Mabel Sturgeon (uncredited)
- The Shopworn Angel (1938) as Dancer (uncredited)
- Letter of Introduction (1938) as Woman at Barry's Party (uncredited)
- Dramatic School (1938) as Fat Girl
- The Family Next Door (1939) as Heavy Girl (uncredited)
- Blue Montana Skies (1939) as Mrs. Millie Potter
- When Tomorrow Comes (1939) as Waitress (uncredited)
- New Moon (1940) as Bridesmaid (uncredited)
- When the Daltons Rode (1940) as Nancy
- Back Street (1941) Minor Role (uncredited)
- City of Missing Girls (1941) as Showgirl (uncredited)
- The Lady from Cheyenne (1941) as Myrtle (uncredited)
- Unfinished Business (1941) as Woman (uncredited)
- Honky Tonk (1941) as Pearl - Saloon Girl (uncredited)
- The Bugle Sounds (1942) as Woman with Cake (uncredited)
- North to the Klondike (1942) as Mayme Cassidy
- Pardon My Stripes (1942) as Peaches
- Take a Letter, Darling (1942) as Switchboard Operator (uncredited)
- In Old California (1942) as Girl in First Saloon (uncredited)
- Enemy Agents Meet Ellery Queen (1942) as Apartment Tenant (uncredited)
- The Old Homestead (1942) as Moll (uncredited)
- My Heart Belongs to Daddy (1942) as Yvonne (uncredited)
- Star Spangled Rhythm (1942) as Officer (uncredited)
- USS VD: Ship of Shame (1942) as Bar Woman toasting 'Chicken' (uncredited)
- The Amazing Mrs. Holliday (1943) as Maid (uncredited)
- Hi'ya, Chum (1943) as Babe Fredericks (uncredited)
- Cowboy in Manhattan (1943) as Tommy
- A Lady Takes a Chance (1943) as Hot Dog Girl (uncredited)
- Fired Wife (1943) as Divorcee (uncredited)
- Sweet Rosie O'Grady (1943) as Flora - Singer (uncredited)
- Swingtime Johnny (1943) as Woman (uncredited)
- True to Life (1943) as Dance Extra (uncredited)
- The Woman of the Town (1943) as Belle
- Chip Off the Old Block (1944) as Cab Driver (uncredited)
- Lady in the Dark (1944) as Autograph Hunter (uncredited)
- Shine On, Harvest Moon (1944) as Mitzie Menegue (uncredited)
- Knickerbocker Holiday (1944) as Barmaid (uncredited)
- Her Primitive Man (1944) as Hatcheck Girl (uncredited)
- Johnny Doesn't Live Here Any More (1944) as Irene
- In Society (1944) as Hysterical Woman (uncredited)
- One Body Too Many (1944) as Mona Rutherford
- Practically Yours (1944) as Sponge Cake Lady (uncredited)
- Under Western Skies (1945) as Maybelle
- The Jade Mask (1945) as Stella Graham
- Here Come the Co-Eds (1945) as Woman in Ballroom (uncredited)
- On Stage Everybody (1945) as Marlow (uncredited)
- The Southerner (1945) as Party Girl (uncredited)
- Sunset in El Dorado (1945) as Maisie - Switchboard Operator
- Marshal of Laredo (1945) as Suzanne (uncredited)
- Girls of the Big House (1945) as Woman Clerk (uncredited)
- Adventure (1945) as Cashier (uncredited)
- The Runaround (1946) as Hotel Desk Clerk / Switchboard Operator (uncredited)
- Shadows Over Chinatown (1946) as Joan Mercer
- Black Angel (1946) as Woman by Phone Booth (uncredited)
- Two Years Before the Mast (1946) as Girl in the Golden Lion (uncredited)
- Dick Tracy vs. Cueball (1946) as Leeds (uncredited)
- That Brennan Girl (1946) as Party Guest (uncredited)
- The Devil Thumbs a Ride (1947) as Pearl (uncredited)
- Backlash (1947) as O'Neil's Secretary (uncredited)
- Killer Dill (1947) as Millie Gardner
- The Secret Life of Walter Mitty (1947) as Wrong Mrs. Follinsbee (uncredited)
- Louisiana (1947)
- Dangers of the Canadian Mounted (1948, Short) as Skagway Kate
- The Walls of Jericho (1948) as Gossip (uncredited)
- Michael O'Halloran (1948) as Ward Nurse
- The Strange Mrs. Crane (1948) as Jeanette Woods
- Sealed Verdict (1948) as Edna Brown (Red Cross date)
- The Paleface (1948) as Attendant at Bathhouse (uncredited)
- Variety Time (1948, Short) as Dorothy Errol (footage from 'Hired Husband') (archive footage)
- Miss Mink of 1949 (1949) as Mrs. Maureen O'Mulvaney
- Mighty Joe Young (1949) as Nightclub Patron (uncredited)
- Lonely Heart Bandits (1950) as Duchess Belle
- Westward the Women (1951) as Rejected Woman (uncredited)
- Footlight Varieties (1951, Short) as Vivian Errol (segment "He Forgot To Remember") (archive footage)
- One Minute to Zero (1952) as First Nurse (uncredited)
- So Big (1953) as Mabel (uncredited)
- New York Confidential (1955) as Lupo's Secretary (uncredited)
- The Desperadoes Are in Town (1956) as Molly, Saloon Girl
- Raintree County (1957) as Madame Gaubert (uncredited)
- Dondi (1961) as Woman in Grape Hat (uncredited) (final film role)
