= One Quiet Night (film) =

1931 film

- Directed by: Fatty Arbuckle (as William Goodrich)
- Written by: Harrison Jacobs; Ernest Pagano; Jack Townley
- Starring: Walter Catlett
- Release date: October 25, 1931
- Running time: 10 minutes
- Country: United States
- Language: English

One Quiet Night is a 1931 American comedy film directed by Fatty Arbuckle, and starring Walter Catlett as Mr. Bates, with Dorothy Granger as Helen. The premise is "Mr. Bates contracts a bad case of hiccups and the doctor prescribes him to rest in quiet" but Bates attempts to follow this advice in a haunted house. The haunting is portrayed with "familiar floating sheets, creepy shadows, and a scary fellow in a top hat. Various animal rugs and stuffed animals talk."
