= Jack Townley =

American screenwriter (1897–1960)

- Born: March 3, 1897; Kansas City, Missouri, USA
- Died: October 15, 1960 (aged 63); Los Angeles, California, USA
- Occupation: Screenwriter
- Years active: 1926–1957

Jack Townley (March 3, 1897 – October 15, 1960) was an American screenwriter. He wrote for nearly 100 films between 1926 and 1957. He was born in Kansas City, Missouri, and died in Los Angeles, California.

== Selected filmography ==
- The Twin Triggers (1926)
- The Wright Idea (1928)
- The Cohens and the Kellys in Atlantic City (1929)
- Smart Work (1931)
- Idle Roomers (1931)
- The Tamale Vendor (1931)
- Once a Hero (1931)
- Queenie of Hollywood (1931)
- One Quiet Night (1931)
- That's My Meat (1931)
- Up Pops the Duke (1931)
- Honeymoon Trio (1931)
- The Lure of Hollywood (1931)
- Windy Riley Goes Hollywood (1931)
- Crashing Hollywood (1931)
- Three Hollywood Girls (1931)
- Hollywood Lights (1932)
- Hollywood Luck (1932)
- Bridge Wives (1932)
- Keep Laughing (1932)
- Moonlight and Cactus (1932)
- Quality Street (1937)
- The Covered Trailer (1939)
- Ice-Capades (1940)
- The Pittsburgh Kid (1941)
- Joan of Ozark (1942)
- The Yellow Rose of Texas (1944)
- Faces in the Fog (1944)
- The Last Round-up (1947)
- The Blazing Sun (1950)
- Havana Rose (1951)
- Cuban Fireball (1951)
- The Fabulous Senorita (1952)
- The Disembodied (1957)
