= Be Yourself! =

1930 film

Be Yourself
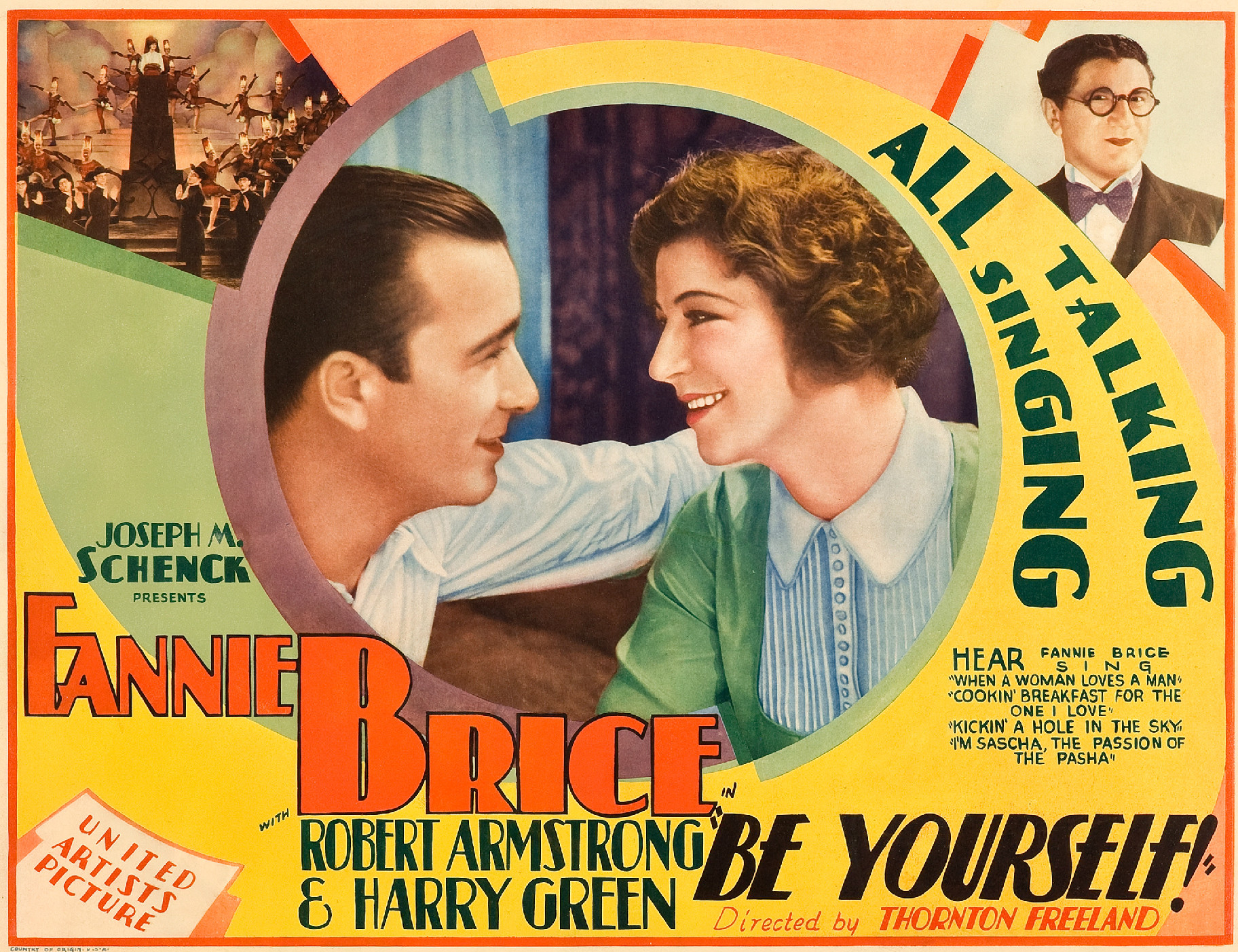
- 1930 film poster
- Directed by: Thornton Freeland
- Written by: Adaptation: Max Marcin; Thornton Freeland
- Story by: Joseph Jackson
- Produced by: John W. Considine Jr.
- Starring: Fanny Brice
- Cinematography: Karl Struss; Robert H. Planck
- Edited by: Robert J. Kern
- Music by: Billy Rose
- Production company: Joseph M. Schenck Productions
- Distributed by: United Artists
- Release date: February 8, 1930
- Running time: 65 minutes
- Country: United States
- Language: English

Be Yourself! is a 1930 American Pre-Code musical comedy film directed by Thornton Freeland and starring Fanny Brice and Robert Armstrong. The plot involves an entertainer (Brice) managing a boxer (Armstrong). The cinematographer was Karl Struss and the running time is 65 minutes.

== Plot ==
In this vehicle film, Fannie Brice plays a star singer and comedienne in a nightclub frequented by Harry Armstrong, a drunk, ham-and-egg boxer looking to break into the big city fight scene. The boxing champion, played by Collins, also attends regular shows. They both are attracted to Fannie, who spurns the champ and falls for Armstrong. The jealous champ and Armstrong brawl in the club, and it is discovered the latter can fight well, too, but only when he's drinking. Brice assigns her sue-happy lawyer and brother played by Harry Greene as Armstrong's boxing manager, and he moves in with the siblings to train.

In previous bouts, a sober Armstrong is a lay-down artists with a fear of being punched. However, with Brice's pushing, he shapes up and wins a string of fights, eventually taking the title from Collins, who not only loses the bout to Armstrong, but also his champ-chasing mistress, played by Astor.

Fannie, knowing Astor is after the man she loves only because he's on top, falls into a deep depression, but soon schemes to get him back. Having just received plastic surgery on his face, Armstrong is rematched with Collins, who is tipped off by Fannie at ringside to aim for Armstrong's face to ruin his nose-job. The plan works: Collins wins the rematch and his mistress immediately comes back to him - it was the only way she could show Astor was no good. Armstrong realizes this and returns to Fannie's side, but only after knocking out the champ in the locker room after having just lost to him.

== Cast ==
- Fanny Brice as Fannie Field
- Robert Armstrong as Jerry Moore
- Harry Green as Harry Field
- G. Pat Collins as "Mac" McCloskey
- Gertrude Astor as Lillian Thorpe
- Budd Fine as Step
- Marjorie Kane as Lola, chorus girl
- Rita Flynn as Jessica

== Songs sung by Fanny Brice ==
- "Cooking Breakfast For The One I Love" (Billy Rose)
- "Kickin' A Hole in The Sky" (Jesse Greer)
- "Sasha" (Jesse Greer)
- "When A Woman Loves A Man" (Ralph Rainger)
