= Bridge Wives =

1932 film

- Directed by: William Goodrich (Roscoe Arbuckle)
- Written by: Ernest Pagano; Jack Townley
- Starring: Al St. John
- Distributed by: Educational Films Corporation of America
- Release date: February 21, 1932
- Running time: 11 minutes
- Country: United States
- Language: English

Bridge Wives is a 1932 American pre-Code comedy film directed by Roscoe "Fatty" Arbuckle.

== Plot ==
Mr. Smith (Al St. John) experiences anxiety as his wife (Fern Emmett) participates in a marathon bridge tournament.

== Cast ==
- Al St. John as Al Smith
- Fern Emmett as Al's wife, Mrs. Smith
- Billy Bletcher as Radio announcer

== See also ==
- Fatty Arbuckle filmography
