= Hollywood Luck =

1932 film

- Directed by: Fatty Arbuckle (as William Goodrich)
- Written by: Ernest Pagano; Jack Townley
- Starring: Virginia Brooks, Rita Flynn, Clarence Nordstrom
- Release date: March 13, 1932
- Running time: 21 minutes
- Country: United States
- Language: English

Hollywood Luck is a 1932 American Pre-Code comedy film directed by Fatty Arbuckle. A sequel to Hollywood Lights (also 1932), this short film follows the same three characters, young women looking for a break in Hollywood.

== Cast ==
- Virginia Brooks
- Rita Flynn
- Betty Grable (as Frances Dean)
- Clarence Nordstrom
- Fern Emmett
- Addie McPhail
- Lynton Brent
- Dennis O'Donnell

== See also ==
- Fatty Arbuckle filmography
