= Keep Laughing (film) =

1932 film

- Directed by: Fatty Arbuckle (as William Goodrich)
- Written by: Ernest Pagano; Jack Townley
- Produced by: Al Christie; E. W. Hammons
- Starring: Monte Collins
- Cinematography: George Webber
- Release date: January 24, 1932
- Running time: 17 minutes
- Country: United States
- Language: English

Keep Laughing is a 1932 American Pre-Code comedy film directed by Fatty Arbuckle under the pseudonym William Goodrich. The film's story focuses on a night club owner.

== Cast ==
- Monte Collins
- Addie McPhail
- Bryant Washburn
- Dorothy Granger
- George Davis
