= Leota Lane =

American actress (1903–1963)

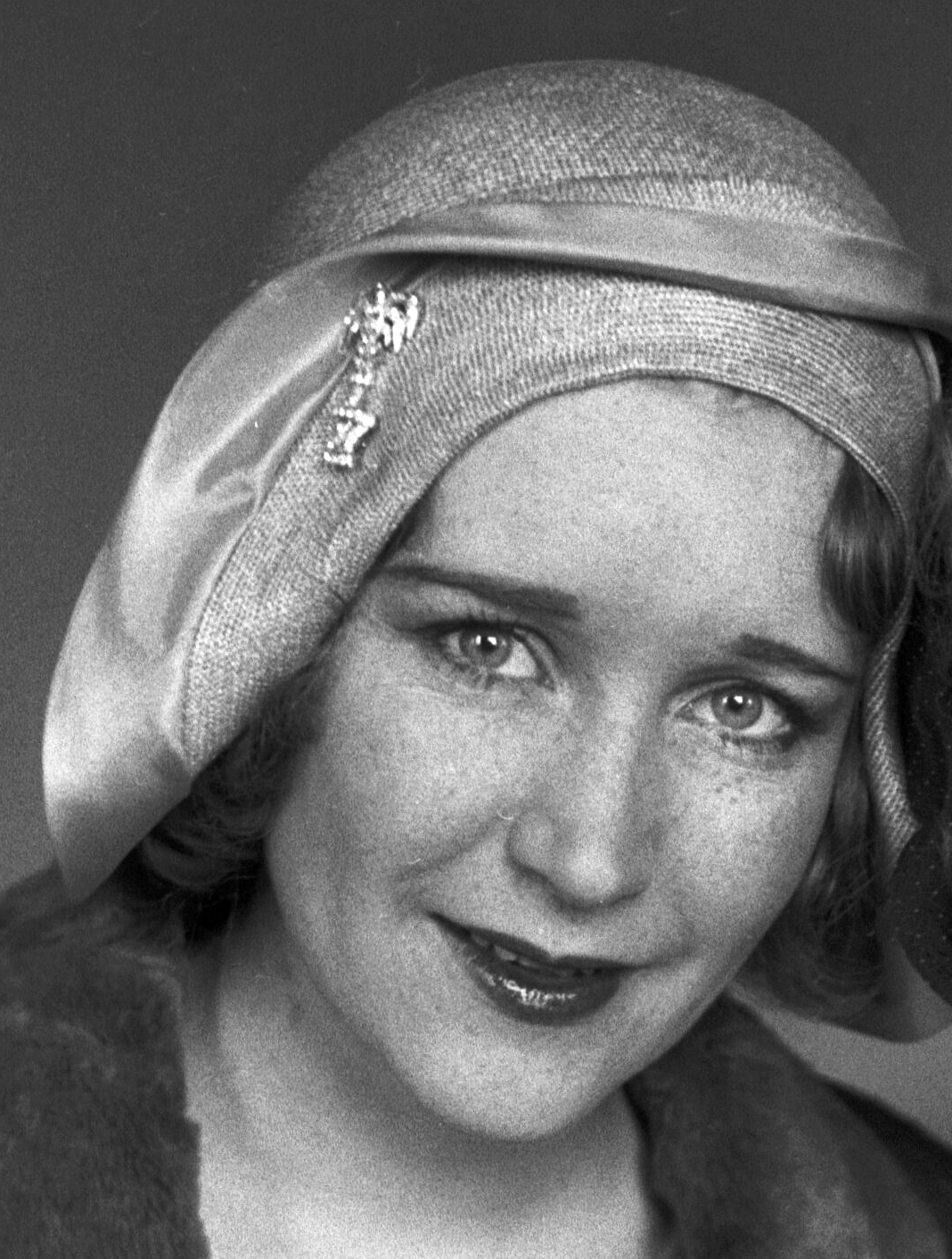
- Lane in 1930
- Born: Leotabel Mullican; October 25, 1903; Indianola, Iowa, U.S.
- Died: July 25, 1963 (aged 59); Glendale, California, U.S.
- Resting place: Forest Lawn Memorial Park, Glendale, California
- Occupation: Actress
- Spouse(s): C Mischel D. Picard (m. 1928; div. 1930) Kenneth Howard Means (m. 1934; div. 1941) Edward Joseph Pitts (m. 1941; div. 1946); Jerome Edward Day (m. 1946)

Leota Lane (born Leotabel Mullican; October 25, 1903 – July 25, 1963) was an American actress, and the oldest sibling in the Lane Sisters family of singers and actresses. Unlike her sisters, Leota did not find the same success and left Hollywood for New York City before the sisters' breakthrough.

== Early years ==
Leota was born in Indianola, Iowa, in 1903, to dentist Lorenzo Mullican and his wife, Cora Bell Hicks. She had four sisters: Dorothy (Lola), Rosemary, Martha, and Priscilla, three of whom later had careers in entertainment. Lane and her sister Lola graduated from a conservatory at Simpson College.

== Career ==
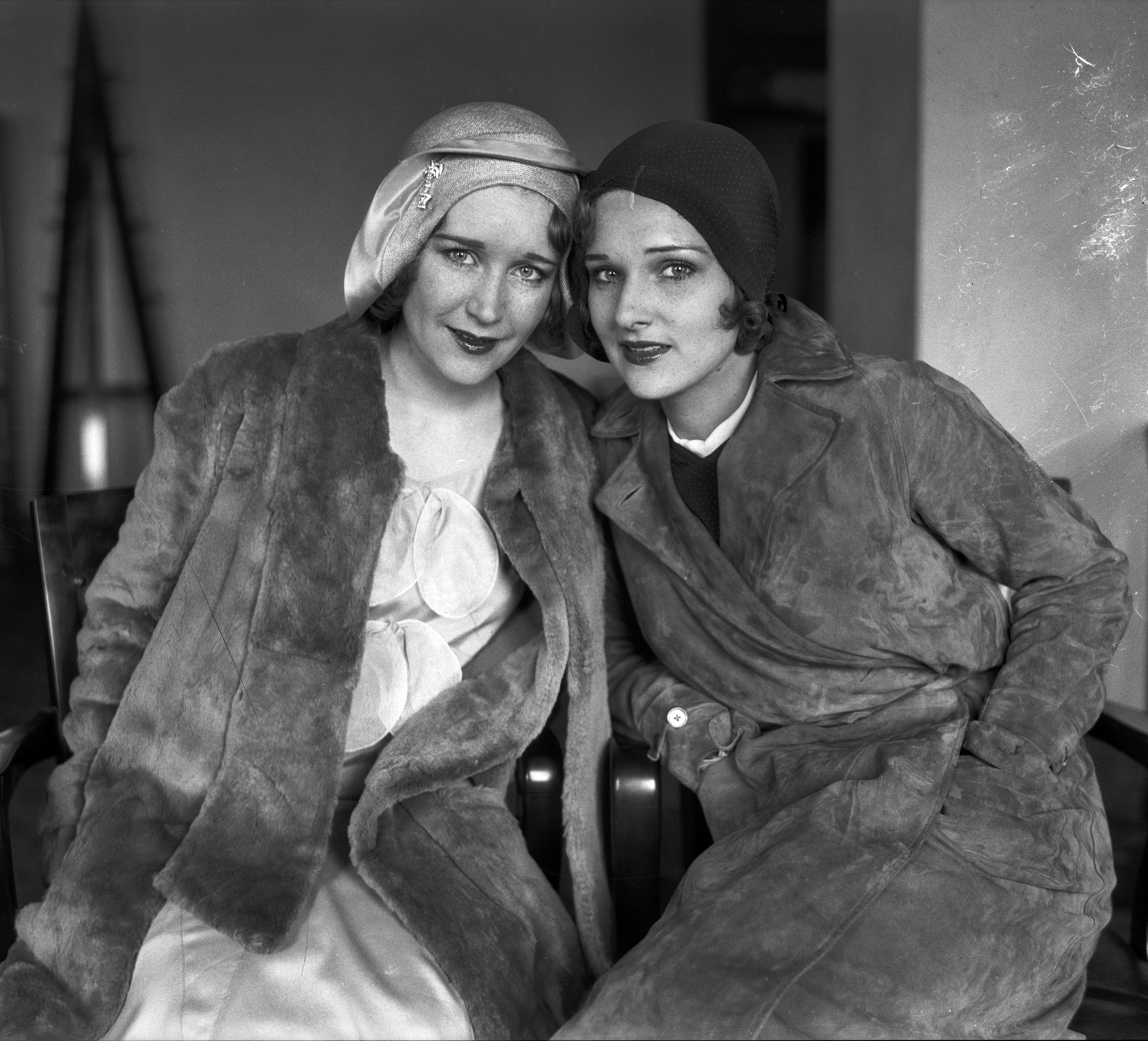
Leota (left) with Lola, 1930

Vaudeville entertainer Gus Edwards discovered them performing in a benefit concert in Des Moines, Iowa and put them on the road to their professional career.

Leota and Lola then left to New York and both made their Broadway debuts in the late twenties, Lola in 1928, as Sally Moss in The War Song, which opened on Broadway on August 24, 1928, at the Nederlander Theatre (then known as the National Theatre) and Leota in 1929 as Contrary Mary in Babes in Toyland, which opened on December 23, 1929, at Jolson's 59th Street Theatre. Leota later followed her sister to Hollywood where she made her first screen appearance in a comedy short film Three Hollywood Girls (1930) directed by Roscoe Fatty Arbuckle, but soon returned to New York, where she later completed a BS degree in music at the Juilliard School in May, 1939. She originally also had a role in Michael Curtiz's Four Daughters (1938), as Emma Lemp but the director replaced her by Gale Page. She plays a role in You"re Next to Closing, another two-reel Vitaphone production (1939), a source erroneously presented as her "film debut" in certain sources.

== Personal life ==
Leota was married four times. She married her first husband C Mischel D. Picard in 1928, they divorced in 1930. She married her second husband Kenneth Howard Means in 1934, they divorced in 1941. She married third husband Edward Joseph Pitts in 1941, they divorced in 1946. And married her fourth husband Jerome Edward Day in 1946, they were married until her death in 1963.

== Death ==
Leota died following open-heart surgery on July 25, 1963, in Glendale, California, aged 59. She was buried in Forest Lawn Memorial Park in Glendale, California.
