= Honeymoon Trio =

1931 film

- Directed by: Fatty Arbuckle (as William Goodrich)
- Written by: Harrison Jacobs; Ernest Pagano; Jack Townley
- Starring: Walter Catlett
- Cinematography: Dwight Warren
- Release date: August 30, 1931
- Running time: 10 minutes
- Country: United States
- Language: English

Honeymoon Trio is a 1931 American pre-Code comedy film directed by Fatty Arbuckle.

== Plot ==
A newlywed couple, John and Dorothy Granger, on honeymoon, but their friend decides to third-wheel.

== Cast ==
- Walter Catlett
- Al St. John
- Dorothy Granger

== See also ==
- Fatty Arbuckle filmography
