= Moonlight and Cactus (1932 film) =

1932 film

- Directed by: Fatty Arbuckle (as William Goodrich)
- Written by: Ernest Pagano; Jack Townley
- Starring: Tom Patricola
- Distributed by: Educational Pictures
- Release date: January 10, 1932
- Running time: 21 minutes
- Country: United States
- Language: English

Moonlight and Cactus is a 1932 comedy film directed by Fatty Arbuckle under the name William Goodrich.

== Cast ==
- Tom Patricola
- Charles Judels
- Charles Dorety
- Louise Lorraine
- Rene Borden
