= Once a Hero (film) =

1931 film

- Directed by: Fatty Arbuckle (as William Goodrich)
- Written by: Ernest Pagano; Jack Townley
- Starring: Emerson Treacy
- Release date: November 22, 1931
- Running time: 19 minutes
- Country: United States
- Language: English

Once a Hero is a 1931 American comedy film directed by Fatty Arbuckle and starring Emerson Treacy.

== Cast ==
- Emerson Treacy
- Betty Grable as Frances Dean
- Jack Shutta
