= Ernest Pagano =

American screenwriter (1901–1953)

- Born: January 16, 1901; Florence, Colorado, U.S.
- Died: April 29, 1953 (aged 52); Los Angeles, California, U.S.
- Occupation: Screenwriter
- Years active: 1927–1947

Ernest S. Pagano (January 16, 1901 – April 29, 1953) was an American screenwriter. He began in showbusiness as a "gag-man" in silent films. He wrote for 66 films between 1927 and 1947. He was born in Florence, Colorado, and died in Los Angeles, California from a heart attack. His brother was the novelist and screenwriter Jo Pagano.

== Partial filmography ==
- Spite Marriage (1929)
- Three Hollywood Girls (1931)
- Pete and Repeat (1931)
- Crashing Hollywood (1931)
- Windy Riley Goes Hollywood (1931)
- The Lure of Hollywood (1931)
- Honeymoon Trio (1931)
- Up Pops the Duke (1931)
- That's My Meat (1931)
- One Quiet Night (1931)
- Queenie of Hollywood (1931)
- Once a Hero (1931)
- The Tamale Vendor (1931)
- Idle Roomers (1931)
- Smart Work (1931)
- Moonlight and Cactus (1932)
- Keep Laughing (1932)
- Bridge Wives (1932)
- Hollywood Luck (1932)
- Hollywood Lights (1932)
- Son of a Sailor (1933)
- The Gold Ghost (1934)
- Allez Oop (1934)
- Shall We Dance (1937)
- A Damsel in Distress (1937)
- Vivacious Lady (1938)
- Carefree (1938)
- The Flying Irishman (1939)
- You'll Never Get Rich (1941)
- You Were Never Lovelier (1942)
- San Diego, I Love You (1944)
- That's the Spirit (1945)
- That Night with You (1945)
- Lover Come Back (1946)
