= By Your Leave =

1934 American domestic comedy film directed by Lloyd Corrigan

- Theatrical poster for the film
- Directed by: Lloyd Corrigan
- Written by: Allan Scott; Lewis Foster
- Based on: the play, By Your Leave by Gladys Hurlbut and Emma B. C. Wells
- Produced by: Pandro S. Berman
- Starring: Frank Morgan; Genevieve Tobin
- Cinematography: Nick Musuraca
- Edited by: William Morgan
- Music by: Max Steiner
- Production company: RKO Radio Pictures
- Release date: November 9, 1934 (US)
- Running time: 82 minutes
- Country: United States
- Language: English

By Your Leave is a 1934 American domestic comedy film directed by Lloyd Corrigan from a script by Allan Scott, Lewis R. Foster, and Sam Mintz. The screenplay was based on a play of the same name by Gladys Hurlbut and Emma B. C. Wells, which had a short run early in the year at the Morosco Theatre. The film was produced by Pandro S. Berman, and starred Frank Morgan and Genevieve Tobin, although several other actresses were initially scheduled to appear in the film, including Mary Astor and Ann Harding. Both stars were on loan to RKO from other studios. It marked the film debuts of two notable Broadway actors, Glenn Anders and Gene Lockhart, the latter of which had a lengthy Hollywood career. By Your Leave opened on November 9, 1934, and received mostly positive reviews.

== Plot ==
Henry and Ellen Smith are a middle-aged married couple who have settled into a routine life in the suburbs of New York. Henry feels that the spice has gone out of their marriage, while Ellen is more content with their lot in life. When the couple comes into a financial windfall, Henry suggests that they take separate vacations. Reluctantly, Ellen agrees, and Henry departs to test the waters of New York City's nightlife. In the city, he meets up with Skeets, and the two go out on the town, eventually ending up pursuing Gloria Dawn and her friend Merle, Broadway dancers. After sitting at home and bemoaning her fate with her housekeeper, Whiffen, for several days, eventually Ellen decides what is good for the goose is good for the gander, and she also departs to have some fun in New York.

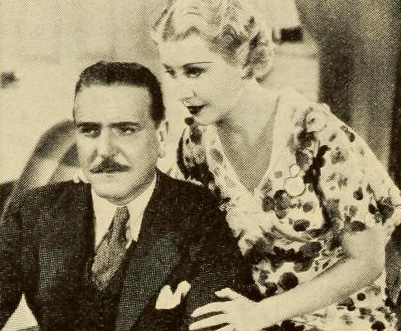
Frank Morgan and Genevieve Tobin

Upon her arrival she meets the sweet-talking world traveler, David McKenzie. When Henry and Skeets fail to connect with the dancers, Henry meets up with an old friend, Freddie Wilkens, who promises to show him a good time. Unbeknownst to Henry, Freddie knows that Ellen is in town also looking for some fun, and he intends to provide it. He sets Henry up with a prostitute, and then goes to seduce Ellen. While Henry takes his "date", Andree, out for the evening, Ellen is busy turning down the advances of Freddie. After Freddie's departure, Ellen seeks out McKenzie, who takes her to dinner.

As the night wears on, the amorous entanglements of both the husband and wife progress. McKenzie is receptive to becoming involved with Ellen, and takes her to his yacht following dinner. He tells her he is sailing the following day. Meanwhile, Andree is also very open to having things proceed further with Henry, and the two head back to his hotel suite. As they do, McKenzie takes Ellen back to her suite. There, things heat up between the two, and he asks her to go away with him when he sets sail.

In Henry's suite, he realizes that things are going too fast, and afraid of what might happen, he sneaks out and heads back to his house in the suburbs. Upon his return to their home, he is upset by the fact that Ellen is not at home. In Ellen's suite, she is confused by the effect that McKenzie's attention is having on her. Putting him off, she tells him that she will give him an answer in the morning. After he leaves, she is afraid of her feelings, and she heads back to her home. After she arrives, she and Henry realize that the two really love each other, and they reconcile.

== Cast ==
- Frank Morgan as Henry Smith
- Genevieve Tobin as Ellen Smith
- Neil Hamilton as David McKenzie
- Marion Nixon as Andree (alias of Lucy Shoemaker)
- Glenn Anders as Freddie Wilkins
- Gene Lockhart as Skeets
- Margaret Hamilton as Whiffen
- Betty Grable as Frances Gretchell
- Charles Ray as Leonard Purcell
- Lona Andre as Florence Purcell
- Lenita Lane as Laura
- Shirley Chambers as Merle
- Addie McPhail as Gloria Dawn

(cast list as per AFI database)

== Production ==
In early January 1934, the play by Gladys Hurlbut and Emma B. C. Wells began a preview run in Philadelphia, starring Dorothy Gish and Howard Lindsay, prior to its opening on January 24 on Broadway at the Morosco Theater. The Motion Picture Herald also gave the play a very good rating, naming it one of that months plays which were "Almost too good for the screen". Towards the end of January and the beginning of February speculation began about whether the play would be optioned to turn into a film. In February, it was announced that RKO had purchased the film rights to the play, with the purchase price announced as $24,000. Later in February, it was speculated that Ann Harding would star in the picture. In April it was announced that Sam Mintz would be working on adapting the play to the screen. By May, Harding was out and Mary Astor was announced to be loaned to RKO to star in the film. In June, Astor was once again announced as one of the stars, with Frank Morgan and Skeets Gallagher also announced as being attached to the film, William Seiter was slated to direct the picture. Morgan was loaned to RKO from MGM. At this point, it was also announced that H. N. Swanson, primarily known as a literary agent, would be the producer on the film. Swanson had worked as an associate producer on several RKO films in 1933 and 1934.

In early July it was announced that production on the film would begin by August 1. By the time the picture was filming in August, Genevieve Tobin was selected to play the female role opposite Morgan; she had been loaned to RKO by Warner Bros. Charles Ray, a famous film star during the silent picture era, was added to the cast the same month. Also in August it was revealed that Allan Scott had written a role specifically into the screenplay for Gene Lockhart, who had been loaned to RKO by MGM. In early September it was revealed that Charles Ray had joined the cast. "Fatty" Arbuckle's widow, Addie McPhail, along with Neil Hamilton and Marion Nixon were also announced as cast members. Nixon was the wife of Seiter, who had originally been slated to helm the picture. In mid-September it was also announced that Lona Andre had been added to the cast. By September 22 principal photography had been completed on By Your Leave. Post-production work on the film had been completed by the end of October. The film was released on November 9, 1934.

Glenn Anders, a noted Broadway actor, made his film debut in this picture. By Your Leave would also mark the film debut of another veteran stage actor, Gene Lockhart, who would go on to have a long prolific career in front of the cameras, appearing in over 100 films. As a result of the work on this film, Lockhart would sign a long-term contract with RKO.

== Reception ==
Nick Musuraca's cinematography was praised in several publications, including The Hollywood Reporter, which called it "very good", and Motion Picture Daily, which also felt his work merited mention. The Film Daily gave By Your Leave a lukewarm review, calling the overall production fair, but applauding the work of the cast, Morgan in particular, and giving both the direction and photography "good" grades. Motion Picture Daily gave the film a glowing review, saying that this comedy "Straight as a die this one got right over to every funny-bone in the audience ...," and the "picture is as smooth a drawing room farce as has been seen in some time". They applauded the acting of the entire cast, singling out Morgan and Margaret Hamilton, as well as lauding the direction and the dialogue. The Oakland Tribune gave the film a positive review, saying that it would "... rock in gales of laughter the most ennui-ed theater-goer." They especially enjoyed the performance of Morgan, and also gave positive mentions to Margaret Hamilton, Marian Nixon, Glenn Anders, and Neil Hamilton. Photoplay also enjoyed the film saying that it was a "... a gilt-edged guarantee of abundant chuckles," and lauding Morgan's performance of a man going through a mid-life crisis as "... the most completely inspired portrait yet of that pathetic creature—a man who wants to be naughty, but who has forgotten how."
