= John Grey (screenwriter) =

American screenwriter (1885–1964)

- Born: December 19, 1885; Manhattan, New York
- Died: December 11, 1964 (aged 78); Los Angeles, USA
- Years active: 1917–1963

John Grey (1885−1964) was an American screenwriter.

== Selected filmography ==
- That's My Meat (1931)
- Chinatown Charlie (1928)
- Speedy (1928)
- The Freshman (1925)
- Crack o' Dawn (1925)
- Super Speed (1925)
- A Self-Made Failure (1924)
- Geared to Go (1924)
- Captain January (1924)
- Fools in the Dark (1924)
- Canyon of the Fools (1923)
- Terror Trail (1921)
- The Mystery Mind (1920)
- The Grim Game (1919)
