= Three Hollywood Girls =

1931 film

- Directed by: Fatty Arbuckle (as William Goodrich)
- Written by: James Gleason (dialogue); Ernest Pagano (dialogue); Jack Townley (dialogue)
- Story by: Sherman Lowe; Katharine Scola
- Starring: Leota Lane
- Distributed by: Educational Pictures
- Release date: December 28, 1930
- Running time: 20 minutes
- Country: United States
- Language: English

Three Hollywood Girls is a 1930 American comedy film directed by Fatty Arbuckle (billed as William Goodrich) and starring Leota Lane.

The film had two reels. It was released in December 1930 and described as an "unusual comedy" in Daily Variety but another review found that it was "not so funny, ts slowtempoed and the majority of the cast read their lines in a stilted manner."

The film has a sequel: Crashing Hollywood (1931).

== Plot ==
An Omaha girl goes to Hollywood looking for work. Other girls allow her to share their apartment. A casting director is interested in one of them but finally chooses "Leota".

== Cast ==
- Leota Lane as Omaha Girl ("Leota")
- Edward J. Nugent as the casting director
- Florence Oberle
- Phyllis Crane
- Rita Flynn
- Ford West

== See also ==
- Fatty Arbuckle filmography
