= Hollywood Lights =

1932 film

- Directed by: Fatty Arbuckle (as William Goodrich)
- Written by: Ernest Pagano; Jack Townley
- Release date: May 8, 1932
- Running time: 20 minutes
- Country: United States
- Language: English

Hollywood Lights is a 1932 American Pre-Code comedy film directed by Fatty Arbuckle, starring Rita Flynn, Virginia Brooks, Tut Mace, and Ted O'Shea. Plot concerned "the adventures of three Hollywood girls in search of a break".

== Cast ==
- Rita Flynn
- Virginia Brooks
- Tut Mace
- Ted O'Shea
- Fern Emmett
- Lynton Brent
- Jack Shaw
- Bert Young
- Betty Grable (as Frances Dean)

== See also ==
- Fatty Arbuckle filmography
