= Fern Emmett =

American actress (1896–1946)

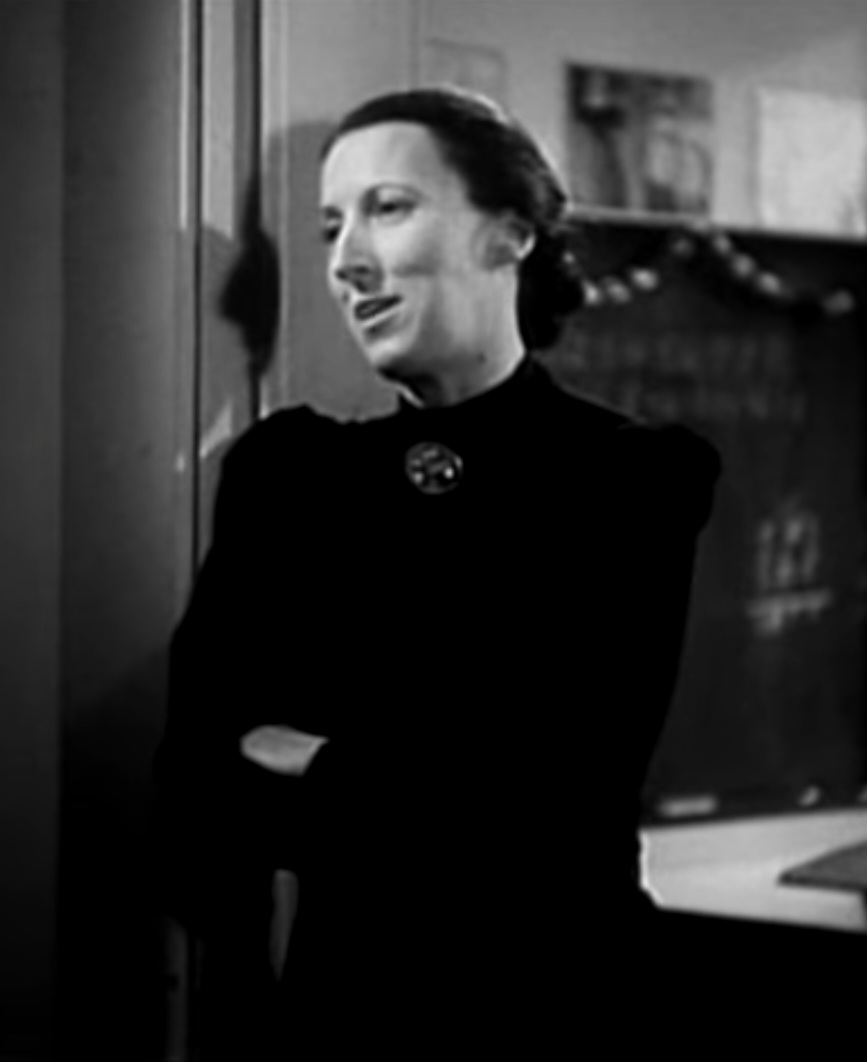
- Emmett in Half a Sinner (1940)
- Born: March 22, 1896; Oakland, California, U.S.
- Died: September 3, 1946 (aged 50); Hollywood, California, U.S.
- Resting place: Forest Lawn Memorial Park, Glendale, California
- Occupation: Actress
- Years active: 1930–1946
- Spouse(s): Henry Roquemore (m. 19??; died 1943)

Fern Emmett (March 22, 1896 – September 3, 1946) was an American film actress. She appeared in 212 films between 1930 and 1946. Emmett's film debut came with Universal in a two-reel production in 1914.

Emmett was born in Oakland, California. Her mother was Norma Burke, and she had a sister. She worked for Columbia and Universal studios.

== Personal life ==
Emmett was married to actor Henry Roquemore.

== Death ==
Emmett died on September 3, 1946, at her home in Hollywood, California. Her remains are interred at Forest Lawn Memorial Park in Glendale, California.

== Selected filmography ==
- Second Honeymoon (1930)
- Romance of the West (1930)
- Westward Bound (1930)
- West of Cheyenne (1931)
- Rider of the Plains (1931)
- Ten Nights in a Bar-Room (1931)
- Dynamite Denny (1932)
- Bridge Wives (1932)
- Hollywood Luck (1932)
- The Forty-Niners (1932)
- Hollywood Lights (1932)
- Love in High Gear (1932)
- East of Fifth Avenue (1933)
- Riders of Destiny (1933)
- Blue Steel (1934)
- Terror of the Plains (1934)
- Loser's End (1935)
- Big Calibre (1935)
- Behind the Green Lights (1935)
- The E-Flat Man (1935)
- Texas Terror (1935)
- Rainbow Valley (1935)
- The Oregon Trail (1936)
- Three on a Limb (1936)
- Ticket to Paradise (1936)
- The Trail of the Lonesome Pine (1936)
- Riders of the Whistling Skull (1937)
- Assassin Of Youth
- Overland Stage Raiders (1938)
- Goodbye Broadway (1938)
- Hidden Enemy (1940)
- Scattergood Baines (1941)
- Caught in the Act (1941)
- Love Crazy (1941)
- Cinderella Swings It (1943)
- Dead Men Walk (1943)
- Johnny Doesn't Live Here Any More (1944)
- San Diego, I Love You (1944)
