= Crashing Hollywood (1931 film) =

1931 film by Fatty Arbuckle

- Directed by: Fatty Arbuckle (as William Goodrich)
- Written by: Ernest Pagano; Jack Townley
- Produced by: Mack Sennett
- Starring: Virginia Brooks; Rita Flynn; Phyllis Crane
- Cinematography: Dwight Warren
- Release date: April 5, 1931
- Running time: 20 minutes
- Country: United States
- Language: English

Crashing Hollywood is a 1931 American pre-Code short comedy film directed by Fatty Arbuckle. The film is a sequel to Three Hollywood Girls (1930).

== Plot ==
A farm girl visits her cousin, an out-of-work actress, in Hollywood. Men flock to the fresh-faced newcomer, including the head of a movie studio, whose house they borrow to throw a wild Hollywood party.

== Cast ==
- Virginia Brooks
- Rita Flynn
- Phyllis Crane
- Edward J. Nugent
- Wilbur Mack
- Walter Merrill
- Bryant Washburn
- George Chandler
- Betty Grable (credited as Frances Dean)

== See also ==
- List of American films of 1931
