= Let's Join Joanie =

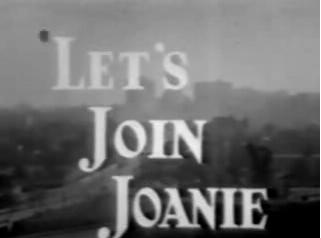
- Genre: Sitcom
- Written by: Keith Fowler; Jesse Goldstein; Hal Goodman
- Directed by: Dick Linkroum
- Starring: Joan Davis; Joe Flynn
- Country of origin: United States
- Original language: English
- No. of seasons: 1

Production
- Camera setup: Multi-camera
- Running time: 33 min
- Production company: Columbia Broadcasting System

Let's Join Joanie is an unaired TV pilot produced in 1950 at CBS Columbia Square in Hollywood as a proposed live weekly (or bi-weekly) series, based on their radio show Leave It To Joan. Its star, Joan Davis, would later star in the popular 1952–1955 sitcom I Married Joan.

== Episode status ==
The pilot is currently in the public domain. It was released on Region 1 DVD by Alpha Video on January 29, 2008.
