= Wake Up and Live =

1937 film

- Theatrical Poster
- Directed by: Sidney Lanfield
- Written by: Story: Curtis Kenyon; Screenplay: Harry Tugend; Jack Yellen
- Based on: Wake Up and Live by Dorothea Brande
- Produced by: Darryl F. Zanuck
- Starring: Walter Winchell; Ben Bernie; Alice Faye
- Cinematography: Edward Cronjager
- Music by: Mack Gordon; Louis Silvers
- Distributed by: 20th Century Fox
- Release date: August 23, 1937
- Running time: 91 minutes
- Country: United States
- Language: English

Wake Up and Live is a 1937 Fox musical film directed by Sidney Lanfield and produced by Darryl F. Zanuck, starring Jack Haley and Alice Faye plus Walter Winchell and Ben Bernie as themselves.

The film tells the story of a man attempting to overcome his fear of singing into microphones in a manner loosely based upon the principles of the 1936 best-selling self-help book Wake Up and Live! by Dorothea Brande. It also traded on the comedic rivalry Winchell and Bernie had played up throughout the 1930s in newspaper columns and on their radio shows, though they were in fact good friends.

Later in 1937, Wake Up and Live was followed by Love and Hisses - not a direct sequel as such, but another film featuring Winchell and Bernie playing themselves.

In 1944, Wake Up and Live was adapted for radio as an episode of Lux Radio Theatre. The Lux production starred Frank Sinatra, Bob Crosby, Marilyn Maxwell and James Dunn.

== Plot ==
Eddie Kane (Jack Haley) comes to town to make it as a singer in a vaudeville duet act with Jean Roberts (Grace Bradley). Unfortunately, he fails an audition at a radio station because he turns out to suffer from "mic fright." Jean goes off to perform on her own, and Eddie obtains work as an usher at the same radio station instead. While at work, Eddie overhears a motivational radio show called Wake Up and Live hosted by Alice Huntley (Alice Faye). He decides to befriend the host and apply the Wake Up and Live techniques to conquer his fear of microphones.

One day, while alone in a studio, Eddie sings into what he thinks is a dead mic as a means of practice and inadvertently goes out live over the air. Audiences across America are charmed by his voice yet nobody knows who he is. A media sensation follows as all attempt to identify the "Phantom Troubadour." Rival radio announcers Walter Winchell and Ben Bernie (playing themselves) get involved, each attempting to outdo each other by being the first to unmask the "Phantom." Eddie himself follows along with interest, not realising that it is him.

Meanwhile, Alice realises what is going on and begins to manipulate the situation for profit. She tells the radio station she knows who he is and will set up broadcasts of his voice from her apartment for money, but will not disclose his identity; she also does not tell Eddie the truth of the situation, and manufactures several convoluted situations in which he is made to sing into a microphone he thinks is off but is in fact live to air. An increasingly complex farce follows before the truth finally comes to light, and Alice and Eddie end up falling in love along the way.

== Cast ==
- Walter Winchell - as Himself
- Ben Bernie - as Himself
- Alice Faye - Alice Huntley
- Patsy Kelly - Patsy Kane
- Ned Sparks - Steve Cluskey
- Grace Bradley - Jean Roberts
- Jack Haley - Eddie Kane
- Walter Catlett - Gus Avery
- Joan Davis - Spanish Dancer
- Paul Hurst - McCabe
- Etienne Girardot - Waldo Peebles
- Condos Brothers
- Brewster Twins
- Elyse Knox - Nurse

== Soundtrack ==
Music by Harry Revel, lyrics by Mack Gordon

- "There's a Lull in My Life", which has become a jazz standard, was written for Alice Faye by Mack Gordon and Harry Revel. It was released as a single and became her only major hit record. The film also features the songs:
- "Never in a Million Years"
- "Wake Up and Live"
- "I'm Bubbling Over"
- "Oh, But I'm Happy"
- "Bernie's Love Song"
- "I Love You Much Too Much, Muchacha"
- "Red Seal Malt"
- "It's Swell of You"

Songs that were supposed to feature Haley were dubbed by Buddy Clark.
