= The Cat's-Paw =

1934 film by Sam Taylor

The Cat’s-Paw
- Directed by: Sam Taylor
- Written by: Sam Taylor
- Based on: The Cat's-Paw by Clarence Budington Kelland
- Produced by: Harold Lloyd
- Starring: Harold Lloyd; Una Merkel; George Barbier; Nat Pendleton
- Cinematography: Bernard W. Burton
- Edited by: Alan Osbiston
- Music by: Alfred Newman
- Production company: Harold Lloyd Corporation
- Distributed by: Fox Film Corporation
- Release date: July 30, 1934
- Running time: 102 minutes
- Country: United States
- Language: English
- Budget: $617,000

The Cat's-Paw is a 1934 American comedy film directed by Sam Taylor and starring Harold Lloyd, Una Merkel and George Barbier. It was Lloyd's seventh and final collaboration with Taylor and the fourth of his seven starring roles in sound. It was distributed by Fox Film. The Cat’s Paw, a novel by Clarence Budington Kelland, had appeared in the Saturday Evening Post from August 26-September 30, 1933, when Lloyd read it, and decided to buy the rights to it for $25,000.

== Plot ==
Ezekiel Cobb, a naïve young man raised by missionaries in China, is sent to the United States to seek a wife. He is promptly enlisted by the corrupt political machine of the fictional city of Stockport, led by the corrupt boss Jake Mayo to run for mayor as phony "reform" politician. He is expected to be the "cat's paw" of the political machine.

Cobb unexpectedly takes his job seriously. Frequently quoting Chinese poet Li Po (pronounced "Ling Po" in the story), he embarks on a campaign to clean his town of its corrupt political machine.

Fighting back, the corrupt politicians frame Cobb. He turns the table on them, however, by enlisting the help of his friends in the local Chinese community, who help him kidnap the corrupt politicians and their hoodlum backers, detaining them in the "cellar of Tien Wang." He tells them that since his attempts to use western methods have not worked, he is going to use the methods of the ancient Chinese: either they confess or they will be executed.

They take a man into a back room – everyone says it's a bluff, but then the man screams in terror and a moment later his decapitated body is brought out with his head set on top of his chest. When the second man is taken to the back room, it is shown that Cobb has enlisted the help of The Great Chang, a famous Chinese magician on his first American tour, and that they are using his tricks to fake the executions.

This tactic works, and Mayor decides to throw his support to Cobb after all. The town is swept of its corruption and Cobb, with the support of local girl Petunia Pratt, abandons plans to return to China and stays in the U.S. to fight corruption in his town. But his new wife insists on him returning to China.

== Cast ==
- Harold Lloyd as Ezekiel Cobb
- Una Merkel as Petunia Pratt
- George Barbier as Jake Mayo
- Nat Pendleton as Strozzi
- Grace Bradley as Dolores Doce
- Alan Dinehart as Mayor Ed Morgan
- Grant Mitchell as Silk Hat McGee
- E. Alyn Warren as Tien Wang (credited as Fred Warren)
- Warren Hymer as Slattery
- J. Farrell MacDonald as Shigley
- Matt McHugh as Taxi Driver

== Production ==
In an early scene, Cobb, as a young boy newly arrived in China, is given a book written by Ling Po. In the closeup of the cover, the words 靈普哲學心理論述 (A Treatise on Philosophy and Psychology by Ling Pu) are seen. However, a subsequent closeup of an open page of the book shows an excerpt from the Analects of Confucius.

== See also ==
- Harold Lloyd filmography
