= My Lucky Star (1938 film) =

American romantic comedy film

- Directed by: Roy Del Ruth
- Written by: Karl Tunberg; Don Ettlinger
- Screenplay by: Harry Tugend; Jack Yellen
- Based on: They Met in Chicago
- Produced by: Darryl F. Zanuck
- Starring: Sonja Henie; Richard Greene; Cesar Romero
- Cinematography: John J. Mescall
- Edited by: Allen McNeil
- Music by: Louis Silvers
- Distributed by: 20th Century Fox
- Release date: September 9, 1938
- Running time: 90 minutes
- Country: United States
- Language: English

My Lucky Star is a 1938 American romantic comedy film. This was Norwegian ice-skating Olympic champion Sonja Henie's fourth film.

== Plot ==
George Cabot Jr. (Cesar Romero), the son of a department store owner, enrolls the store's sports clerk Krista Nielsen (Sonja Henie) at a university to use her as an advertisement for their fashion department.

George is trying to pay off cabaret singer Marcelle La Verne, who wants to annul their brief elopement. Marcelle threatens to name Krista as a co-respondent in her lawsuit. Krista has fallen for Larry Taylor at the college, where a skating exhibition lands her on the cover of Life magazine.

== Cast ==
- Sonja Henie as Krista Nielsen
- Richard Greene as Larry Taylor
- Joan Davis as Mary Dwight
- Cesar Romero as George Cabot Jr
- Buddy Ebsen as Buddy
- Arthur Treacher as Whipple
- George Barbier as George Cabot Sr
- Gypsy Rose Lee as Marcelle La Verne (as Louise Hovick)
- Billy Gilbert as Nick
- Patricia Wilder as Dorothy
- Paul Hurst as Louie
- Elisha Cook Jr. as Waldo
- Robert Kellard as Pennell
- Gloria Brewster as June (as The Brewster Twins)
- Barbara Brewster as Jean (as The Brewster Twins)

== Production ==
The film was originally called They Met in College and started in April 1938. In March Richard Greene was signed to be her leading man.

Rehearsals started in April with over 300 ballet skaters. Buddy Ebsen was borrowed from MGM.

In April the title was changed to My Lucky Star.

20th Century Fox found this the easiest of Henie's films to make to date. s o

The film went six days over schedule.

== Reception ==
Filmink summarized it as having a "Silly story. Poor male lead – Greene acts like an army officer doing amateur theatricals. Great skating."
