= Joan Davis =

American actress and vaudevillian (1912–1961)

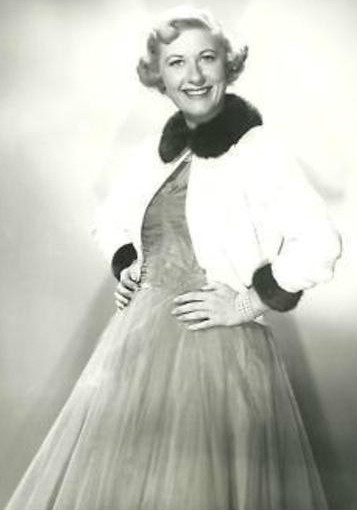
- Davis on I Married Joan (c. 1952/53)
- Born: Josephine Davis; June 29, 1912; Saint Paul, Minnesota, U.S.
- Died: May 23, 1961 (aged 48); Palm Springs, California, U.S.
- Resting place: Holy Cross Cemetery, Culver City
- Occupations: Actress, vaudevillian
- Years active: 1935–1955
- Spouse: Si Wills (m. 1931; div. 1948)
- Children: Beverly Wills

Josephine Madonna Davis (June 29, 1912 – May 23, 1961), known professionally as Joan Davis, was an American comedic actress whose career spanned vaudeville, film, radio, and television. Remembered best for the 1950s television comedy I Married Joan, Davis had a successful earlier career as a screen actress (notably in the Abbott and Costello comedy Hold That Ghost), and a leading star of 1940s radio comedy.

Born in Saint Paul, Minnesota, she was the only child of LeRoy Davis and Nina Mae (née Sinks) Davis, who were married in St. Paul on November 23, 1910. Davis had been a performer since childhood. She appeared with her husband Si Wills in vaudeville.

== Career ==
=== Films ===
Davis' first film was a short subject for Educational Pictures titled Way Up Thar (1935), a hillbilly comedy featuring a then-unknown Roy Rogers. Educational's distributor, Twentieth Century-Fox, signed Davis for feature films. Tall and lanky, with a comically flat speaking voice, she became known as one of the few female physical clowns of her time, and developed a reputation for flawless physical comedy. She appeared steadily in Fox features for several years (with Alice Faye, Shirley Temple, Jane Withers, The Ritz Brothers, and Sonja Henie, among others), playing supporting roles in major pictures and larger, featured roles in minor ones.

By the early 1940s Fox was no longer making many comedies, and did not renew her contract. She began freelancing, first at Universal Pictures with Abbott and Costello, then Republic, then RKO with Kay Kyser and then Eddie Cantor. Columbia signed her to star in a pair of musical comedies with Jane Frazee, and she returned to RKO opposite Jack Haley in 1945 and Cantor in 1948. Her last motion picture was the Columbia comedy feature Harem Girl (1952).

=== Radio ===
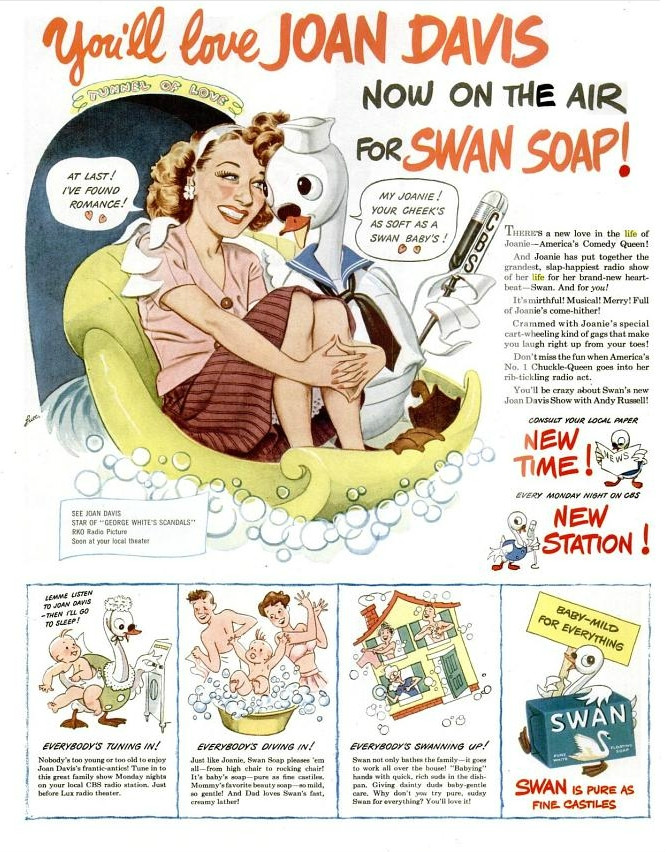
Swan Soap ad featuring Davis' radio show, 1945

Davis entered radio with an August 28, 1941, appearance on The Rudy Vallee Show and became a regular on that show four months later. Davis then began a series of shows that established her as a top star of radio situation comedy throughout the 1940s. When Vallee left for the Coast Guard in 1943, Davis and Jack Haley became the co-hosts of the show. With a title change to The Sealtest Village Store, Davis was the owner-operator of the store from July 8, 1943, to June 28, 1945 when she left to do Joanie's Tea Room on CBS from September 3, 1945 to June 23, 1947. Sponsored by Lever Brothers on behalf of Swan Soap, the premise had Davis running a tea shop in the little community of Smallville. The supporting cast featured Verna Felton. Harry von Zell was the announcer, and her head writer was Abe Burrows, formerly the head writer (and co-creator) of Duffy's Tavern and eventually a Broadway playwright.

The tea shop setting continued in Joan Davis Time, a CBS Saturday-night series from October 11, 1947, to July 3, 1948. With Lionel Stander as the tea shop manager, the cast included Hans Conried, Mary Jane Croft, Andy Russell, the Choraliers quintet, and John Rarig and his Orchestra. Leave It to Joan ran from July 4 to August 22, 1949, as a summer replacement for Lux Radio Theatre and continued from September 9, 1949, to March 3, 1950. She was heard on CBS July 3 through August 28, 1950. She was a frequent and popular performer on Tallulah Bankhead's radio variety show The Big Show (1950–1952).

Davis was also a regular on Eddie Cantor's Time to Smile program. Davis had an affair with Cantor over the course of four years. Writer Budd Schulberg commented, "Everybody knew about the affair with Joan Davis -- everybody in the business." The relationship culminated in her divorce from Si Wills in December 1947, while the Cantor-Davis film If You Knew Susie was in production. After the divorce was finalized and the picture was completed, Davis and Cantor went their separate ways.

=== Television ===
Davis was the star of the unsold pilot Let's Join Joanie, recorded in 1950. The proposed series was a television adaptation of Leave It to Joan.

When I Love Lucy premiered in October 1951 on the CBS network and became a top-rated TV series, sponsors wanted more of the same, with another female performer who could handle physical comedy. I Married Joan premiered in 1952 on NBC, casting Davis as the manic wife of a mild-mannered community judge (Jim Backus), who got her husband into wacky jams with or without the help of a younger sister, played by her real-life daughter Beverly Wills. Davis was also one of the show's executive producers. I Married Joan did not achieve the ratings success enjoyed by I Love Lucy, but during its first two years, it received moderately successful ratings, even cracking the top 25 for the 1953–1954 season. However, by the start of its third year, not only were the ratings beginning to slip, but Davis was experiencing fatigue from heart issues. She asked to be released from her contract, and the series was canceled in the spring of 1955. I Married Joan experienced greater success in syndication; it was one of the early series to succeed with local stations.

In 1956, a year after I Married Joan ended its primetime run, Davis was approached by ABC to star in The Joan Davis Show. The premise of this series had Davis playing a musical-comedy entertainer who had raised a daughter on her own. Davis used her real name as the lead character. Veteran actress Hope Summers was cast as Joan's housekeeper, and Wills was signed to play Joan's daughter, also named Beverly. Ray Ferrell was cast as Joan's grandson Stevie. In the pilot, Joan was introduced to her five-year-old grandson for the first time and was trying to convince Beverly, despite her hectic show-business schedule and her somewhat zany personality, that she was a loving and responsible grandmother. The pilot did not sell as a series for ABC. It was forgotten among Davis' television work until many years later when the Museum of Television and Radio in New York discovered the program and added it to its collection.

== Death ==
On May 23, 1961, Davis died of a heart attack at age 48 at her home in Palm Springs, California. She was interred in the Holy Cross Cemetery mausoleum in Culver City, California.

On October 24, 1963, Joan Davis' mother (Nina Davis), daughter (Beverly Wills), and two grandchildren were all killed in a house fire in Palm Springs. The deaths of Davis' next of kin complicated the administration of her estate. I Married Joan was pulled from syndication until legal matters, including her residuals from the show's syndicated reruns, could be settled in court.

Joan Davis has two stars on the Hollywood Walk of Fame, one for her contribution to the motion picture industry at 1501 Vine Street and one for radio in the 1700 block of Vine.

== Filmography ==
Year	Title	Role	Notes	Ref(s)
1935	Way Up Thar	Jennie Kirk	Mack Sennett Short subject	
1935	Millions in the Air	Singer		
1936	Bunker Bean	Mabel, Bunker's Secretary	Uncredited	
1937	The Holy Terror	Lili		
1937	On the Avenue	Miss Katz – Dibble's Secretary		
1937	Time Out for Romance	Midge Dooley		
1937	The Great Hospital Mystery	Flossie Duff	Alternative title: Dead Yesterday	
1937	Angel's Holiday	Strivers		
1937	Sing and Be Happy	Myrtle		
1937	You Can't Have Everything	—	Uncredited	
1937	Wake Up and Live	Spanish Dancer		
1937	Thin Ice	Orchestra Leader	Alternative titles: Lovely to Look at Der Komet	
1937	Life Begins in College	Inez	Alternative titles: Life Begins at College; The Joy Parade	
1937	Love and Hisses	Joan		
1938	Keep Smiling	Self		
1938	Sally, Irene and Mary	Irene Keene		
1938	Josette	May Morris		
1938	My Lucky Star	Mary Dwight		
1938	Hold That Co-ed	Lizzie Olsen	Alternative title: Hold That Girl	
1938	Just Around the Corner	Kitty		
1939	Tail Spin	Babe Dugan		
1939	Too Busy to Work	Lolly		
1939	Day-Time Wife	Joyce Applegate		
1940	Free, Blonde and 21	Nellie		
1940	Sailor's Lady	Myrtle		
1940	Manhattan Heartbeat	Edna Higgins		
1941	For Beauty's Sake	Dottie Nickerson		
1941	Hold That Ghost	Camille Brewster	Alternative title: Oh, Charlie	
1941	Sun Valley Serenade	Miss Carstairs		
1941	Two Latins from Manhattan	Joan Daley		
1942	Yokel Boy	Molly Malone	Alternative title: Hitting the Headlines	
1942	Sweetheart of the Fleet	Phoebe Weyms		
1943	He's My Guy	Madge Donovan		
1943	Two Señoritas from Chicago	Daisy Baker		
1943	Around the World	Joan Davis		
1944	Beautiful But Broke	Dottie Duncan		
1944	Show Business	Joan Mason		
1944	Kansas City Kitty	Polly Jasper		
1945	She Gets her Man	Jane "Pilky" Pilkington		
1945	George White's Scandals of 1945	Joan Mason		
1946	She Wrote the Book	Jane Featherstone		
1948	If You Knew Susie	Susie Parker		
1949	Make Mine Laughs	compilation feature of musical and comedy sketches, including the "Who Killed Vaudeville?" number from George White's Scandals		
1950	The Traveling Saleswoman	Mabel King	Producer	
1950	Love That Brute	Mamie Sage		
1950	Let's Join Joanie		Unaired CBS pilot	
1951	The Groom Wore Spurs	Alice Dean		
1952	Harem Girl	Susie Perkins		
1952-1955	I Married Joan	Joan Stevens	99 episodes Producer	

== Award nominations ==
Year	Award	Category
1953	Emmy Awards	Best Comedienne

== See also ==
- Golden Age of Television
- Let's Join Joanie (failed pilot with Joan Davis)
