= Brewster Twins =

American twin actresses

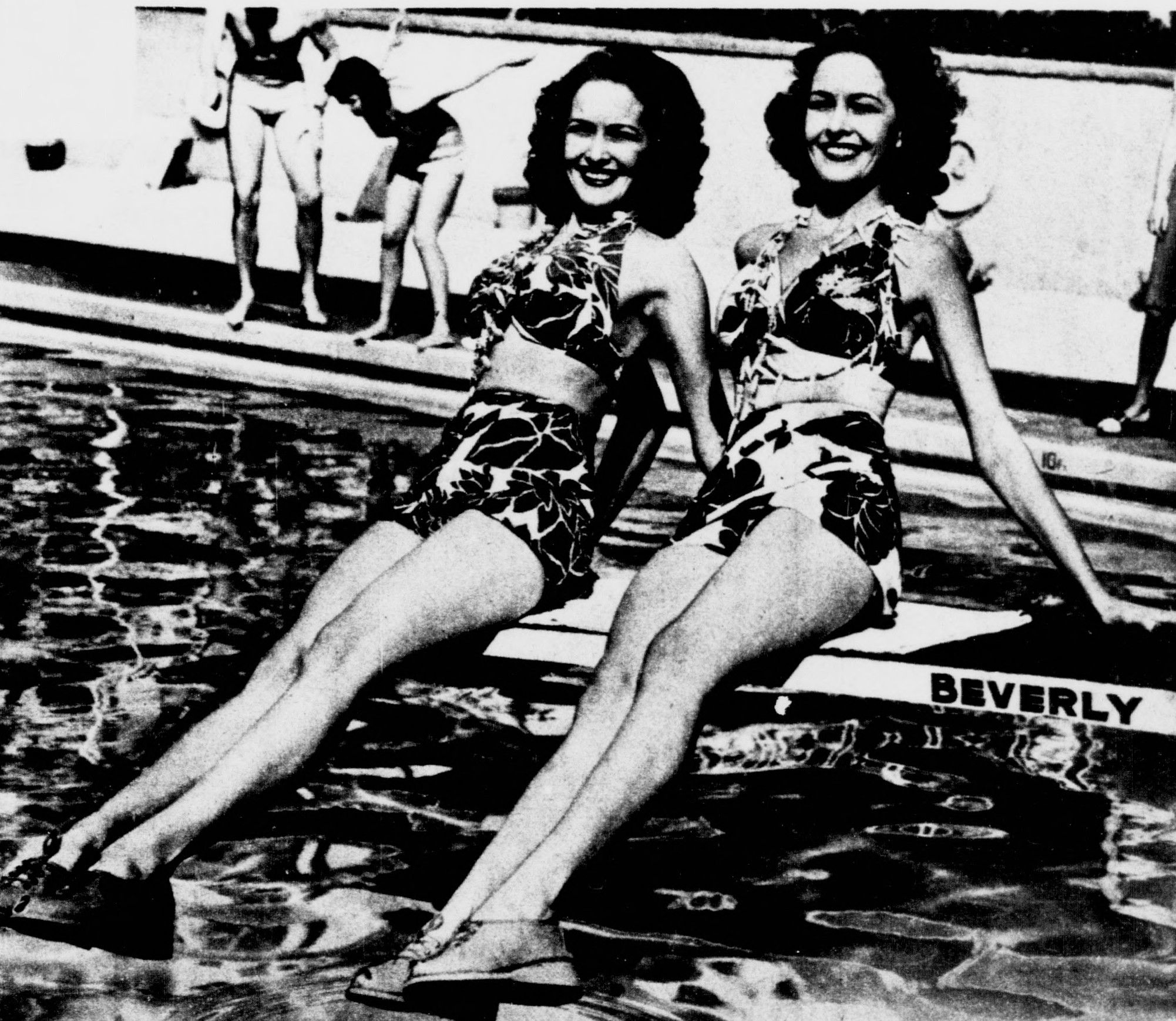
Brewster Twins in 1941

Barbara Brewster LeMond (1918–2005) and Gloria Brewster Stroud (1918–1996), known together as Brewster Twins, were American film actresses and dancers in the late 1930s and early 1940s. The twin sisters were born Naomi and Ruth Stevenson respectively in Tucson, Arizona.

== Career ==
The Brewster Twins appeared in nine films under contract to 20th Century Fox in the late 1930s and early 1940s, and were called "the Most Beautiful Twins in America". They appeared as "Stuart Morgan Dancers" in High Kickers on Broadway in 1941-42, which was Gloria's last work as she married one of her co-stars from the movie Twincuplets and retired.

Barbara performed on the stage in New York with Sophie Tucker, among other stars, and with Montgomery Clift in Foxhole in the Parlor. She performed in USO shows during World War II in the South Pacific, where she met Bob LeMond, a radio and television announcer. Their subsequent marriage lasted 58 years. She retired from show business in 1946, later moving to Bonsall, California.

== Deaths ==
Gloria Brewster Stroud died in 1996 and Barbara Brewster LeMond died aged 87 of congestive heart failure and pneumonia in June 2005.

== Filmography ==
- Ditto (1937)
- Life Begins in College (1937)
- Wake Up and Live (1937)
- Love and Hisses (1937)
- Wife, Doctor and Nurse (1937)
- Happy Landing (1938)
- Hold That Co-ed (1938)
- Little Miss Broadway (1938)
- My Lucky Star (1938)
- Thanks for Everything (1938) – uncredited
- Twincuplets (1940)
- The Flame of New Orleans (1941)
