= Hold That Co-Ed =

1938 film

Hold That Co-ed
- Directed by: George Marshall
- Screenplay by: Karl Tunberg; Don Ettlinger and Jack Yellen
- Story by: original story by Karl Tunberg and Don Ettlinger
- Produced by: David Hempstead (associate producer)
- Starring: John Barrymore; George Murphy; Marjorie Weaver; Joan Davis; Jack Haley; George Barbier; Ruth Terry; Donald Meek; Johnny Downs; Paul Hurst; Guinn Williams
- Cinematography: Robert Planck, A.S.C.
- Edited by: Louis Loeffler
- Music by: Arthur Lange (musical direction)
- Production company: Twentieth Century-Fox Film Corporation
- Distributed by: 20th Century Fox
- Release date: September 16, 1938
- Running time: 80 minutes
- Country: United States
- Language: English

Hold That Co-ed is a 1938 American comedy film directed by George Marshall, starring John Barrymore, George Murphy, Marjorie Weaver, Joan Davis and Jack Haley.

== Plot ==
Former star quarterback Rusty Stevens believes he is being hired to be prosperous Clayton University's new football coach, but finds it is actually rundown State College in the same town that is giving him that job.

Gov. Gabby Harrigan, who is running for the U.S. Senate, has slashed State's budget so much that the school only owns one football. Rusty leads a student protest at the state capitol that ends up in a brawl. The governor's opponent in the Senate campaign, Major Breckenridge, capitalizes politically on Harrigan's unpopularity at the college.

Harrigan's bright secretary Marjorie Blake persuades the governor to retaliate by raising funds for State and proposing to build it a 100,000-seat stadium (to be named after him). She also recruits new players for State including a couple of tough wrestlers, promising them government jobs and $500 a game. State begins winning game after game.

As a publicity stunt, State even ends up with college football's first woman, co-ed Lizzie Olsen becoming the team's kicker. Harrigan publicly dares mighty Clayton to a game, challenging his adversary by vowing to quit the Senate race if State loses the game. Breckenridge has no choice but to accept.

All is well until Rusty reveals the unethical payment to players. A depleted State squad is overmatched during the game, but with the score 7–6 in Clayton's favor, on the last play of the game Lizzie snatches a batted-down pass in mid-air and crosses the goal line for a game-winning touchdown for State.

== Cast ==
- John Barrymore as Governor
- George Murphy as Rusty
- Marjorie Weaver as Marjorie
- Joan Davis as Lizzie Olsen
- Jack Haley as Wilbur
- George Barbier as Breckenridge
- Ruth Terry as Edie
- Donald Meek as Dean Fletcher
- Johnny Downs as Dink
- Paul Hurst as Slapsy
- Guinn Williams as Mike
- Brewster Twins as Themselves
- Bill Benedict as Sylvester
- Frank Sully as Steve
- Charles Wilson as Coach Burke
- Glenn Morris as Spencer

Uncredited (in order of appearance)
Fred Kohler Jr.	Daly, football player for Clayton, who tells Rusty, "When we want your advice, we'll ask you for it"
Ethan Laidlaw	campus policeman around whom Rusty and Lizzie Olsen dance
Cy Schindell	state capitol policeman who tries using a riot stick to hit a student
Charles Williams	McFinch, construction company owner who tells Breckinridge, "But a great break for you, Major"
Robert Middlemass	Egan, Breckinridge's campaign committeeman who tells him, "Major, that's an excellent idea"
Tom Chatterton	Breckinridge's political advisor who tells him, "You'd get Gabby right where you want him"
Bess Flowers	Breckinridge's secretary to whom he says, "Oh, Miss Sward, take this down"
John Dilson	Governor's Director of Public Works who says, "But Governor, a million for a football stadium... how are you ever going to fill a stadium that big?"
Frank Jaquet	legislator who tells Governor, "Sure, look at the teams you play... Springville Academy... Hambard Normal School..."
Larry Steers	architect for Governor's proposed new stadium for State
Douglas Evans	radio announcer at football game between State College and Louisiana who says, "So it's David versus Goliath... little State against lucky Louisiana..."
Hank Mann	Alex, soda jerk at post-Louisiana game party to whom Governor says, "Alex, get and give the boys and girls anything they want and send the bill to me"
John Elliott	one in a group of six legislators advising Breckinridge to adopt Governor's tactics
Carroll Nye	radio newscaster who says, "And now, on this coast-to-coast hookup, we bring you the latest development in the Harrigan–Breckinridge senatorial campaign"
Dick Winslow	State College bandleader at party for opening of new student union
Stanley Andrews	Belcher, Breckinridge's committeeman who says, "Being born a Republican was my first mistake"
Sam Ash	legislator who says to Breckinridge, "Major, we might as well face facts... our campaign hasn't been an unqualified success"
Cyril Ring	radio reporter on football field for game between State and Clayton
Doodles Weaver	Gilks, State football player
Russell Hicks	president
Ruth Warren	mother
Harry Hayden	spokesman
Clem Bevans	Judkins

== See also ==
- List of American football films
