= Skyscraper Souls =

1932 film

- Theater poster, 1932
- Directed by: Edgar Selwyn
- Written by: C. Gardner Sullivan (adaptation); Elmer Blaney Harris (dialogue continuity)
- Based on: Skyscraper; 1931 novel by Faith Baldwin
- Starring: Warren William; Maureen O'Sullivan; Gregory Ratoff; Anita Page
- Cinematography: William H. Daniels
- Edited by: Tom Held
- Music by: Nathaniel Shilkret (uncredited)
- Production company: Cosmopolitan Productions
- Distributed by: Metro-Goldwyn-Mayer (MGM)
- Release date: July 16, 1932 (United States)
- Running time: 99 minutes
- Country: United States
- Language: English
- Budget: $382,000
- Box office: $555,000

Skyscraper Souls is a 1932 American pre-Code romantic drama film starring Warren William, Anita Page, Maureen O'Sullivan, Gregory Ratoff, and Verree Teasdale. Directed by Edgar Selwyn, it is based on the 1931 novel Skyscraper by Faith Baldwin.

== Plot ==
The film portrays the aspirations, daily lives, and tragedies experienced by several people in the fictional 100-story Dwight Building in New York City, home to the Manhattan Seacoast National Bank. Among them is David Dwight, the womanizing building owner who keeps his estranged wife, Ella, happy by paying her bills. Sarah Dennet, the manager of the building's administrative office and Dwight's lover of 12 years, wants Dwight to obtain a divorce so they can marry.

== Cast ==
- Warren William as David "Dave" Dwight
- Maureen O'Sullivan as Lynn Harding
- Gregory Ratoff as Mr Vinmont
- Anita Page as Jenny LeGrande
- Verree Teasdale as Sarah Dennet
- Norman Foster as Tom Shepherd
- George Barbier as Charlie Norton
- Jean Hersholt as Jacob "Jake" Sorenson
- Wallace Ford as Slim
- Hedda Hopper as Ella Dwight
- Helen Coburn as Myra
- John Marston as Bill
- Richard Alexander as Man Tom Bumps Into
- Oscar Apfel as Brewster's Associate
- Frank Atkinson as Waiter At Party
- Reginald Barlow as Brewster's Associate
- Harry C. Bradley as Johnson, Dwight's Secretary
- Edward Brophy as Man in Elevator
- Gordon De Main as Banker
- Jesse De Vorska as Sol - Vinmont's Associate
- Billy Gilbert as Second Ticket Agent
- Boris Karloff as Man Approaching Ticket Counter
- Tom Kennedy as Masseur
- Arnold Lucy as Banker
- Geneva Mitchell as Mrs. Kyne
- William Morris as Hamilton
- Edmund Mortimer as Party Guest
- Dennis O'Keefe as Stock Brokerage Clerk
- Lee Phelps as John - Gym Attendant
- Purnell Pratt as Harrington Brewster
- Henry Roquemore as Man Who Loses His Hat
- Larry Steers as Party Guest

== Reception and box office ==
Upon the release of Skyscraper Souls in the summer of 1932, The Film Daily, a widely read trade paper among movie-industry personnel and theater owners, gave the production a very positive review. The paper cited in particular the film's "swell cast" and the broad public appeal of its "fast-moving" plot, especially within the highly unstable environment of the United States' depressed economy at that time:

Warren William and his excellent supporting cast, by their consistently interesting performances, are enough to keep this story alive even if it weren't an engrossing and attractively staged big town romance. The title gives only a part hint of the tale, which revolves around William, an idealist whose career just about runs the gamut of big business and stock market manipulation, with the crooked and the straight both involved in the dealings. Love interest and sex appeal also play their part in the action. General theme of the story—the mad desire of everyone from bank presidents to the lowest man in the street, to climb up the ladder of fortune—gives the picture a wide appeal. Also, with the present revival of upward activity in the stock market, it has a timeliness angle that should give it much added value.

Mordaunt Hall, the respected film critic of The New York Times in 1932, also praised the storyline of Skyscraper Souls, calling it "a rich measure of entertainment" and "replete with suspense and vitality." However, the weekly trade paper Variety—also one of the more influential reviewers in the entertainment industry at the time—disagreed with The Film Daily and The New York Times regarding their positive opinions about the film's plot, although Variety did give generally high marks as well to the cast's performances:

First-rate cast and production dropped on a bush-league scenario, a not uncommon occurrence. In this instance the players are hardly more than a pair of crutches to make a lame plot's limping a bit easier. At the Capitol [Theatre in New York City] the picture was geared far beyond natural length to run 99 minutes. ...Warren William mooches away with the works. On loan from Warners, he's in good company in this cast. From the stately Verree Teasdale to the dimpled Maureen O'Sullivan, his femme support is extra special, while the underlined men, including Norman Foster, Jean Hersholt and Wallace Ford, are no slouches. The acting they contribute gives the picture all its value...William makes the most of a financial giant who's ruthless in his business and romance methods....

With regard to the film's "box office" or the number of theater-ticket buyers it attracted, Skyscraper Souls generated an appreciable profit for Cosmopolitan Productions and MGM. The film is reported to have earned $444,000 in the United States and Canada and $111,000 elsewhere, for an overall total of $555,000. Subtracting the film's reported budget of $382,000 from the cited gross derives a net profit on investment of $173,000.
