= Beverly Wills =

American actress (1933–1963)

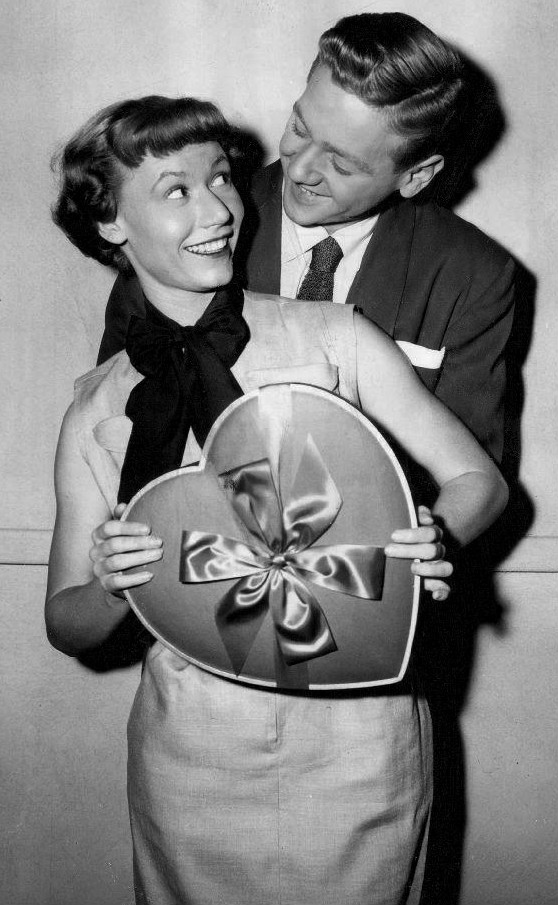
- Wills and Tom Peters on the set of I Married Joan, 1954.
- Born: Beverly Josephine Williams; June 7, 1933; Los Angeles, California, U.S.
- Died: October 24, 1963 (aged 30); Palm Springs, California, U.S.
- Occupation: Actress
- Spouses: Lee Bamber (m. 1952; div. 1953) Alan Grossman (m. 1954; div. 1958) Martin Colbert (m. 1960)
- Children: 2

Beverly Wills (born Beverly Josephine Williams; June 7, 1933 – October 24, 1963) was an American television and film actress.

== Biography ==
She was born in Los Angeles to actress and comedian Joan Davis and actor and writer Si Wills. Wills made her film debut in George White's Scandals (1945) when she was age 11. Mickey (1948) followed three years later.

In 1952, at age 18, Wills appeared with her mother and Jim Backus in the TV comedy I Married Joan (1952–1955). She played the younger sister of her real-life mother. After the series ended its run, Wills appeared in four more films, including Some Like It Hot (1959) and Son of Flubber (1963).

Wills briefly dated actor James Dean in the early 1950s, when he was enrolled at the University of California in Los Angeles. Their relationship ended after Dean "exploded" when Wills was asked to dance by another man.

Wills married three times before the age of 30. Her first marriage was to Lee Bamber, a Pasadena fireman, in 1952. Bamber and Wills eloped to Carson City, Nevada. The couple divorced in 1953. She later married Alan Grossman on July 11, 1954; the couple had two sons. Wills and Grossman divorced, and she married Martin Colbert.

On October 24, 1963, Wills died in a house fire with her grandmother and both children from her second marriage. The fire started due to the 30-year-old Wills smoking in bed. Her mother, Joan, had died of a heart attack two years earlier at age 48.

== Filmography ==
| Year | Title | Role | Notes |
|---|---|---|---|
| 1938 | Anaesthesia | Little girl | short, uncredited |
| 1945 | George White's Scandals | Joan as a child | |
| 1948 | Raw Deal | Girl | uncredited |
| 1948 | Mickey | Cathy Williams | |
| 1952 | Skirts Ahoy! | Boots | uncredited |
| 1953 | Small Town Girl | Deidre | |
| 1953 | The Life of Riley | Audrey | 1 episode |
| 1953–1955 | I Married Joan | Beverly Grossman | 5 episodes |
| 1954 | The Student Prince | Flirt | uncredited |
| 1956 | The Millionaire | Barbara | episode: "The Louise Williams Story" |
| 1956 | The People's Choice | Mandy's girlfriend | episode: "Sock and the Mayor's Election" |
| 1957 | Matinee Theater | | episode: "Out of the Frying Pan" |
| 1957 | Tales of Wells Fargo | Sissy Stillwell | episode: "Man in the Box" |
| 1958 | Date with the Angels | | episode: "Wheeler at the Cabin" |
| 1958 | Buckskin | Cassie | episode: "Lament for Durango" |
| 1959 | Some Like It Hot | Dolores | |
| 1961 | The Ladies Man | Miss Hypochondriac | |
| 1962 | The Tall Man | | episode: "The Impatient Brides" |
| 1963 | Son of Flubber | Mother in commercial | |
| 1963 | Vacation Playhouse | Clara Boone | episode: "Hooray for Love" |
| 1963 | Petticoat Junction | Mrs. Norton | episode: "Uncle Joe's Replacement" |
| 1964 | Mister Ed | Judy Price | episode: "Ed the Shish Kebab" |
