= Hollywood Showcase =

American old-time radio talent shows

- Country of origin: United States
- Language(s): English
- Syndicates: CBS
- Starring: Mary Astor; Edna Best; Janet Gaynor; Hedda Hopper; Mickey Rooney
- Announcer: Bob LeMond; Bob Green; Frank Goss; Bill Goodwin
- Written by: Virginia Cooke; Paul West; Jean Holloway; Bill Manhoff
- Directed by: Mann Holiner; Bill Lawrence
- Produced by: Paul Pierce; Bob Hafter; Russ Johnston; Ken Niles; Charles Vanda; Larry Berns
- Original release: July 24, 1937 – September 12, 1948
- Sponsored by: Richard Hudnut Cosmetics; Ben Hur Coffee

Hollywood Showcase is the title of two American old-time radio talent shows, both of which were broadcast on CBS in the 1930s and 1940s. During some intervals, the program was carried only on CBS's west-coast stations.

== 1937-1944 version ==
Hollywood Showcase debuted on July 24, 1937, and was broadcast at a variety of times and with some interruptions until 1944. Each episode featured "talented but little recognized professional, semi-professional and amateur artists" with winners selected by members of the studio audience. The winning act was rewarded with a week's engagement at the Orpheum Theater in Los Angeles. By July 1942, the format had changed to have five contestants, with three winners selected to return to perform again.

Mary Astor became the show's host on April 1, 1941—her first time as host of a radio program. The Richard Hudnut cosmetics company sponsored the program from April 1, 1941, until September 21, 1942. Company officials cited wartime restrictions on obtaining powder as the reason for cancellation of the sponsorship.

In July 1942, Astor took a leave of absence to serve with the Civil Air Patrol, and Edna Best substituted for her. At some point thereafter, Janet Gaynor became the host, and in early December 1943, Hedda Hopper replaced Gaynor. By then, Ben Hur Coffee was the sponsor until that arrangement ended in July 1944. The change to Hopper brought the addition of a segment focused on gossip about the film industry.

Announcers for the program during these years included Bob LeMond, Bob Green, Frank Goss and Bill Goodwin. Lud Gluskin led the orchestra. Paul Pierce, Bob Hafter, Russ Johnston, Ken Niles and Charles Vanda were producers. Mann Holiner and Bill Lawrence were directors. Virginia Cooke and Paul West were writers.

== 1948 version ==
Mickey Rooney starred in this iteration, which debuted on July 4, 1948, and ended on September 12, 1948. The 30-minute program was heard at 10 p.m. Eastern Time on Sundays.The show provided another radio opportunity for Rooney, whose Shorty Bell newspaper drama had ended in June 1948. Relatively unknown singers, musicians, and actors appeared on the program, performing with Rooney as they were judged by a three-person panel.

Regular performers on the show were Dave Barry, Buddy Cole, Barbara Fuller, and Julie Wilson. Lemond was the announcer, and Gluskin led the orchestra. Jean Holloway and Bill Manhoff were writers. Larry Berns and Hafter were producers.

CBS lost money on the program, leading to its demise. The trade publication Billboard reported in its August 14, 1948, issue, "... there's nothing on the black side of the ledger to counterbalance the red ink. And there's plenty of the latter ..."

=== Critical response ===
Jack Gould, in a review in The New York Times, described the program as "not notably different from any number of other attractions which insist they are offering the 'stars of tomorrow'". He also thought that Rooney's pace ("always rush, rush and rush") could be wearing on listeners.

A review in the trade publication Variety noted that Rooney dominated the premiere episode, singing a duet with a vocalist, accompanying a pianist on the drums, and joining an actress in a dramatic sketch. "As a matter of fact," the review said, "in reflecting back, one wonders how anyone else manages to get a crack at the mike — or, for that matter, why it's necessary. For this is strictly Rooney's 'baby'."

== Selected episodes ==
- October 31, 1937 - "George Gershwin Biography"
- November 14, 1937 - Smith Ballew stars in a dramatization of the film Hawaiian Buckaroo.
- July 29, 1938 - Lanny Ross and Gloria Stuart co-star in a vignette from the film The Lady Objects.
- April 22, 1941 - Berry Kroeger stars in A Tale of Two Cities.
- May 13, 1941 - Kroeger and Astor co-star in The Importance of Being Earnest.
- July 15, 1941 - Paul Dubov and Astor co-star in Cog in the Wheel.
