= Love, Honor, and Oh Baby! =

1933 American film directed by Edward Buzzell

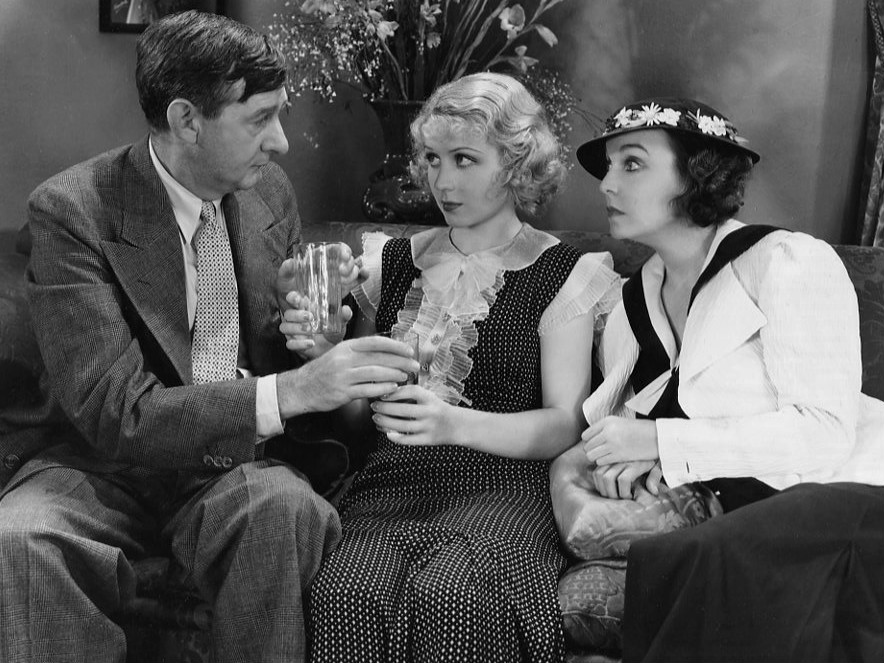
- Still with Slim Summerville, Adrienne Dore, and ZaSu Pitts
- Directed by: Edward Buzzell
- Written by: Edward Buzzell; Norman Krasna; Howard Lindsay (play); Bertrand Robinson (play)
- Starring: Slim Summerville; Zasu Pitts
- Cinematography: George Robinson
- Distributed by: Universal Pictures
- Release date: October 1, 1933
- Running time: 65 min.
- Country: United States
- Language: English

Love, Honor, and Oh Baby! is a 1933 American pre-Code comedy film, starring Slim Summerville, ZaSu Pitts, and George Barbier. A group of stars rounds out the rest of the cast that includes Donald Meek, Lucille Gleason and Varree Teasdale. Adapted from the stage play Oh, Promise Me (which was also the film's working title) it is ”a situation comedy, carrying a romantic twist”. The film did not do well nor was it well reviewed by The New York Times, which called it unfunny.

The 1940 Universal Pictures film with almost the same title is not a remake.

== Plot ==
A secretary plots with her ambulance chasing lawyer, Slim, to compromise her employer for a breach of promise suit. Besides recovering handsomely at the trail, her boyfriend is provided with a case.

== Cast ==
- Slim Summerville as Mark Reed
- ZaSu Pitts as Connie Clark
- George Barbier as Jasper B. Ogden
- Lucille Gleason as Flo Bowen
- Verree Teasdale as Elsie Carpenter
- Donald Meek as Luther Bowen
- Purnell Pratt as Marchall Durant
- Adrienne Dore as Louise
- Dorothy Granger as Mrs. Brown
- Neely Edwards as Mr. Brown
- Henry Kolker as The Judge
