= Bob LeMond =

American actor (1913–2008)

- Born: Robert West leMond, Jr. April 11, 1913; Hale Center, Texas
- Died: January 6, 2008 (aged 94); Bonsall, California, United States
- Occupations: Radio and television announce; radio actor; TV actor; voice artist

Robert West LeMond, Jr. (April 11, 1913 – January 6, 2008) was an American radio and television announcer who was best known as the voice who announced for the television shows Leave It to Beaver and Ozzie and Harriet. LeMond was also the announcer for the first radio sitcom by Lucille Ball, My Favorite Husband, as well as for the first television pilot episode of I Love Lucy. The peak of his announcing career spanned from the 1930s well into the 1960s.

== Early life ==
Bob LeMond was born in Hale Center, Texas on April 11, 1913. He was raised in Southern California, and was reportedly a star football player at Long Beach Polytechnic High School, as indicated by his winning letters in football and wrestling. After graduating, he sold classified advertising, drove trucks, and worked with a cement crew before beginning to work in radio.

LeMond first became involved in radio announcing during the 1930s. He was selling advertising for the Los Angeles Herald-Examiner when his brother-in-law asked him to read a commercial for a radio show that his advertising agency was sponsoring. This audition was performed live on the air, and LeMond was hired on the spot for a salary of $20 a week. He worked at KEHE (later KECA) in Los Angeles in 1937–38 and at KYA in San Francisco in 1938–39 before being hired by CBS as one of its main announcers.

In 1942, LeMond was the announcer for The Second Mrs. Burton and Hollywood Showcase on radio. An October news report indicated that he would be the announcer for Lights Out, but military service intervened.

In October 1942, Lemond qualified to be a tower control operator with the United States Army Air Forces. He continued to announce even after entering the U.S. Army during World War II, where he worked for Armed Forces Radio from 1942 until 1946. He ran the Mosquito Network, which broadcast to United States military personnel throughout the South Pacific. After the Japanese surrendered, he was named manager and officer in charge of Radio Tokyo.

He met his future wife, Barbara Brewster of the 20th Century Fox Brewster Twins, at a USO while stationed in New Caledonia. Brewster and LeMond were married in 1946 after the end of World War II. The couple eventually had three children together. The marriage lasted for 59 years until her death in June 2005.

== Post-war career ==
LeMond returned to work at CBS after World War II, where he enjoyed the peak of his career. His most famed work came as the announcer for Lucille Ball's radio sitcom My Favorite Husband from 1948 until 1951. He continued to work with Ball as the announcer for the pilot episode of the television show which eventually became I Love Lucy. (This original pilot episode, which never aired, was lost for many years before being rediscovered in 2000 or 2001).

LeMond's other blossoming television and radio credits during the 1940s, 1950s and 1960s included Leave It to Beaver, The Red Skelton Show, Red Skelton, Bat Masterson, Our Miss Brooks, My Friend Irma, Spike Jones, Edgar Bergen's Do You Trust Your Wife? and Life with Luigi. He also announced for countless television special events including the Academy Awards (for sponsor General Motors' Oldsmobile division) and the Tournament of Roses Parade.

Additionally, LeMond continued to work as a voice actor for television and radio commercials. One of his most famous commercials included a spot for Raid bug spray with Mel Blanc, the legendary voice actor and voice of Bugs Bunny. His other commercial credits included Dial Soap, Oldsmobile and Johnson's Wax, just to name a few.

== Later life ==
LeMond gradually began to receive less work by the mid-1960s, as the television medium changed and the demand for announcers fell. He officially retired from show business in 1971 and moved to Bonsall, California in 1972. He worked as a real estate agent and became active with Bonsall's homeowners' association. Many of his new neighbors had no idea about LeMond's past career in television and radio.

In 1998, LeMond and the surviving cast members of My Favorite Husband were reunited by Gregg Oppenheimer, the son of Jess Oppenheimer, the original creator and producer of the show, to benefit pediatric AIDS research. LeMond reprised his role as the announcer of the show for the event. Oppenheimer commented at the time on LeMond, who used to both announce and warm up the live studio audience before the show, "He did it again, and it was like magic. It was like it was 1948."

The original pilot episode of I Love Lucy, with LeMond as the show's announcer, was rediscovered in 1990 by the real-life widow of the actor Pepito Pérez, who played Pepito the Clown, who found the missing program under her bed. However, the first 15 seconds of LeMond's original narration was missing from the film. Gregg Oppenheimer owned the pilot episode's original script, complete with the missing narration. Oppenheimer, who produced the I Love Lucy DVD releases beginning in 2002, drove to LeMond's home in Bonsall and asked him to re-record the original, missing narration. LeMond agreed and read the words into a microphone which Oppenheimer had brought with him. In doing so, LeMond and Oppenheimer recaptured the first words which were ever associated with I Love Lucy. Oppenheimer was happy with the results of the audio recording: "He sounded older, but it worked."

== Death ==
Bob LeMond died of complications from dementia at his home in Bonsall, California, on January 6, 2008. His survivors included three sons, Rob, Stephen and Barry, five grandchildren, and a great-grandchild.
