= Love and Hisses =

1937 film

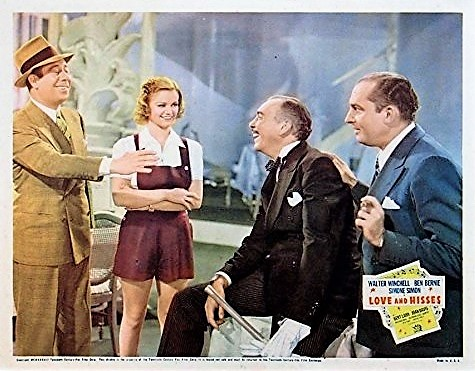
- Lobby card
- Directed by: Sidney Lanfield
- Written by: Art Arthur; Curtis Kenyon
- Produced by: Kenneth Macgowan; Darryl F. Zanuck
- Starring: Walter Winchell; Ben Bernie; Simone Simon
- Cinematography: Robert H. Planck
- Edited by: Robert L. Simpson
- Production company: 20th Century-Fox
- Distributed by: 20th Century-Fox
- Release date: December 21, 1937
- Running time: 82 minutes
- Country: United States
- Language: English

Love and Hisses is a 1937 American musical comedy film directed by Sidney Lanfield and starring Walter Winchell, Ben Bernie and Simone Simon. It is the sequel to the film Wake Up and Live. Darryl F. Zanuck at 20th Century Fox wanted to continue the series with further films, but Winchell chose to return to New York to concentrate on his newspaper and radio work.

== Cast ==
- Walter Winchell as Walter Winchell
- Ben Bernie as Ben Bernie
- Simone Simon as Yvett Guerin
- Bert Lahr as Sugar Boles
- Joan Davis as Joan Dolan
- Dick Baldwin as Steve Nelson
- Ruth Terry as Hawaiian Specialty Singer
- Douglas Fowley as Webster
- Chick Chandler as Hoffman
- Charles Williams as Irving Skolsky
- Georges Renavent as Count Guerin
- Charles Judels as Oscar
- Robert Battier as Gangster
- Hal K. Dawson as Music store clerk
- Peters Sisters as Hawaiian Vocal Trio
- Carol Chilton as Dance Specialty Duo
- Maceo Thomas as Dance Specialty Duo
- Brewster Twins as Themselves
- Gary Breckner as Radio Announcer
- Harry Stubbs as Producer
- Carol Adams as Dancer
- Hooper Atchley as Joe Moss
- Lynn Bari as Nightclub Patron
- Lynne Berkeley as Minor Role
- A.S. 'Pop' Byron as Policeman
- Lon Chaney Jr. as Attendant
- Donald Haines as Newsboy
- John Hiestand as Radio Announcer
- Philippa Hilber as Minor Role
- Rush Hughes as Announcer
- George Humbert as Chef
- Fred Kelsey as Officer
- Edward McWade as Ticket Seller
- June Storey as Minor Role
- Charles Tannen as Hotel Desk Clerk
- Ben Welden as Bugsy
- June Wilkins as Minor Role
