= The Milky Way (1936 film) =

1936 American film

- Film poster
- Directed by: Leo McCarey; Ray McCarey (uncredited fill-in director); Norman Z. McLeod (uncredited fill-in director)
- Screenplay by: Grover Jones; Frank Butler; Richard Connell
- Based on: The Milky Way; 1934 play by Lynn Root; Harry Clork
- Produced by: E. Lloyd Sheldon
- Starring: Harold Lloyd
- Cinematography: Alfred Gilks
- Edited by: LeRoy Stone
- Music by: Tom Satterfield; Victor Young
- Distributed by: Paramount Pictures
- Release date: February 7, 1936
- Running time: 88 minutes
- Country: United States
- Language: English
- Budget: $1,032,798.21
- Box office: $1,170,000 (US)

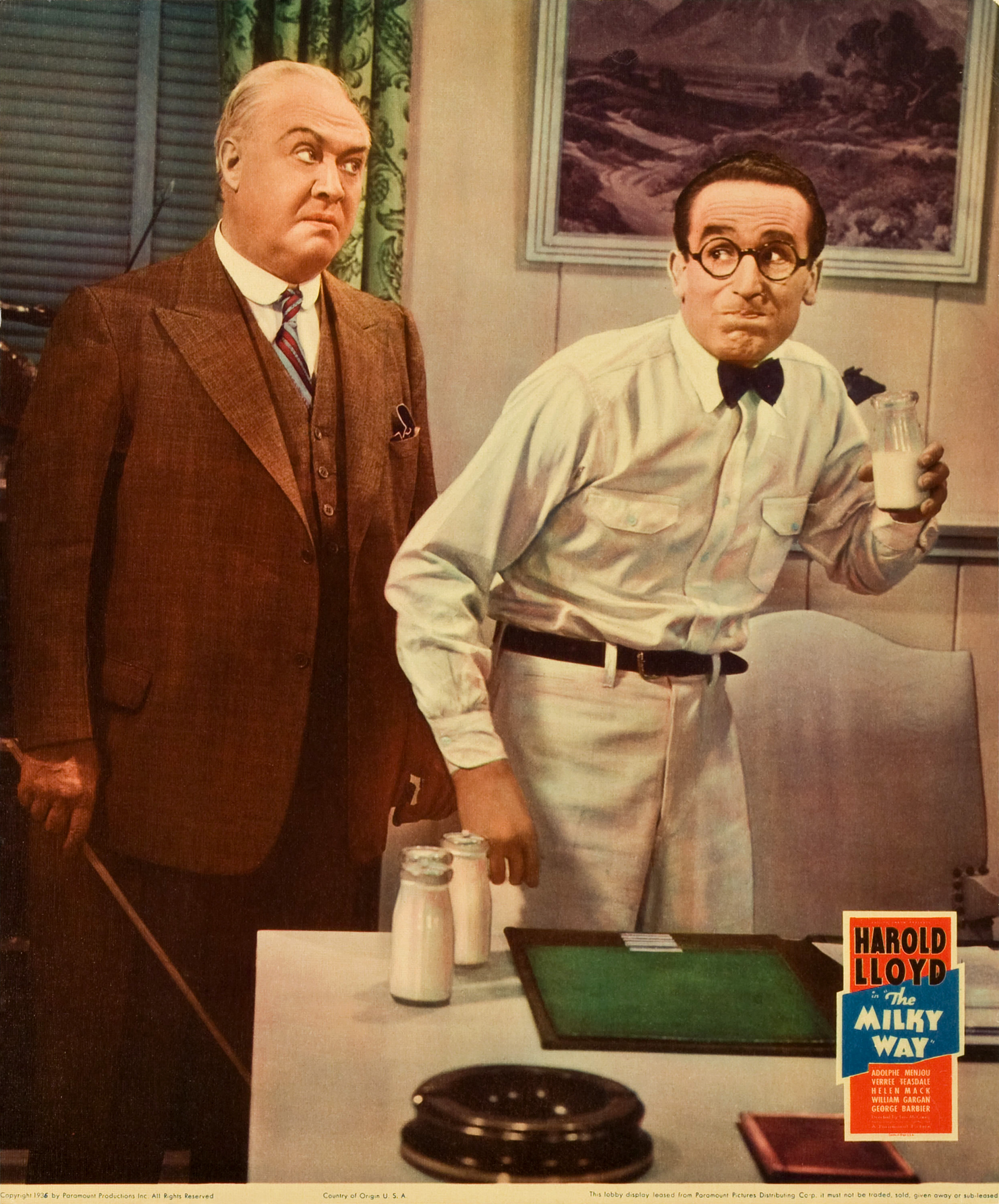
The Milky Way (1936) poster

The Milky Way is a 1936 American comedy film starring Harold Lloyd. Directed by comedy veteran Leo McCarey, the film was written by Grover Jones, Frank Butler and Richard Connell based on a play of the same name by Lynn Root and Harry Clork that was presented on Broadway in 1934.

An example of the popular screwball comedy genre of the time, and critically Harold Lloyd's most successful talkie, it tells the story of a Brooklyn milkman who becomes middleweight boxing champion. The Milky Way features supporting performances by Adolphe Menjou and Verree Teasdale and marks the film debut of Anthony Quinn with a small uncredited role. The film's copyright was not renewed, but its reuse is restricted as a derivative of the still copyrighted play it is based on. (Note: The 1934 play was renewed under R276563. A song from the film was registered in 1935 and renewed in 1962 under R303067.)

== Plot ==
Timid milkman Burleigh Sullivan works for the American company Sunflower Dairies. Two drunk men try to chat up Mae, Sullivan's sister, and he chances by. In an ensuing brawl, Speed McFarland, the world middleweight champion, gets knocked out, but Sullivan never in fact threw a punch; he merely ducked to get out of the way of a punch thrown by Speed's bodyguard which brought the champ down. When trying to explain what happened to Speed's boss, Gabby Sloan and others in view, the newspapers walk in on the aftermath that accidentally demonstrates Spider having knocked out Speed after Burleigh ducks again.

McFarland's boss, the crooked Gabby Sloan, conspires to promote Sullivan in a series of fights but Burleigh only agrees to fight when he wants to help his horse "Agnes", who falls sick one night when he gets fired from his job. It is when he calls a veterinarian that he comes across Polly Pringle, Sloan's girlfriend. Gabby helps Burleigh come up with a fighting strategy by having him imitate the waltz. Soon Burleigh engages in the fights (which end in quick one-round knockouts), with his wins making him grow in stature and in arrogance. What he doesn't realize is that his rise will culminate in him being knocked out in a real fight with McFarland. The dairy company, in an attempt to make some good publicity, decide to buy Burleigh's contract for $50,000 that could make plenty of money for Gabby provided that Speed wins. Polly, displeased by Burleigh's new attitude, leaves him, calling him a "killer". Mae, who took up with Speed, starts having second thoughts about allowing Speed to participate in the fight (in an attempt to humble Burleigh) and tells Polly about it.

However, when the actual fight is set to occur, Burleigh finds a horse and brings it along to the fight venue for perceived good luck. When he brings it to the door where McFarland happens to be, he accidentally knocks Speed down with the horse's feet. When Gabby and Spider try to help Speed recover, they accidentally give him medicine meant for "insomnia". Polly and Mae try to stop Burleigh from doing the fight, but he goes through with it. When the fight does occur, Burleigh wins the fight through a series of hijinks where Speed and him go through a slow waltz that sees both of them slide down to the ground. Burleigh narrowly gets up just as the referee counts to ten to become the world champion. Wilbur immediately approaches Burleigh about quitting the fight business to become a partner back at Sunflower Dairies, which he accepts. When asked about what will happen to Speed now that he lost, Burleigh happily notes that he took Speed's money and bet it on himself at "3-to-1 odds".

== Cast ==
- Harold Lloyd as Burleigh "Tiger" Sullivan
- Adolphe Menjou as Gabby Sloan (Speed's manager)
- Verree Teasdale as Ann Westley
- Helen Mack as Mae Sullivan (Burleigh's sister)
- William Gargan as Speed McFarland (middleweight champ)
- George Barbier as Wilbur Austin
- Dorothy Wilson as Polly Pringle
- Lionel Stander as Spider Schultz (Speed's bodyguard)
- Marjorie Gateson as Winthrop Lemoyne
- Charles Lane as Willard
- Anthony Quinn as an extra
- Thomas Curran as an extra

== Production ==
The Milky Way had originally been optioned as a vehicle for Jack Oakie with Edward Everett Horton and Gertrude Michael in the main supporting roles, but when Oakie was replaced with Harold Lloyd, the role of the manager was to go to William Frawley, because studio executives felt that Lloyd and Horton were too similar in comic style. The part eventually went to Adolphe Menjou. Both Brian Donlevy, who played the role of Speed McFarland on Broadway, and boxer-turned-actor Max Baer were considered for roles in the film, but were not cast. Actress Ida Lupino was to have played Polly Pringle, but withdrew because of illness, to be replaced by Dorothy Wilson. Helen Mack and Verree Teasdale were also replacements, the parts having originally gone to Sally Blane and Gail Patrick. Although they do not appear in the film, the Dionne Quintuplets had been expected to make an appearance.

Filming began on July 22, 1935, but was interrupted by the illnesses of Menjou, Teasdale and director Leo McCarey, who was hospitalized. McCarey's place was taken by his brother Ray McCarey and by veteran director Norman Z. McLeod. During filming, when a suitable white horse for Burleigh could not be found, makeup artists bleached a dark-colored horse blond.

== Reception ==
Writing for The Spectator in 1936, Graham Greene provided a positive review, giving particular praise to Harold Lloyd and Adolphe Menjou. Greene noted that "with the gag-makers at the top of their form and Mr Menjou at the top of his, we have the best 'Harold Lloyd' to date."

== Adaptations and remakes ==
A one-hour radio adaptation was presented on Lux Radio Theatre on November 4, 1935, featuring Charles Butterworth.

When producer Samuel Goldwyn bought the rights to the property in the mid-1940s for his remake, The Kid from Brooklyn (with Danny Kaye in the lead role), he also bought the original negative and almost all existing prints and destroyed them. However, Harold Lloyd had preserved an original nitrate release print, which became the source for the new digital video transfer used by TCM. Lionel Stander played the role of "Spider" Schultz in both versions of the film.

In 2004, the premise of a mild-mannered milkman-turned-boxer would again be used in the mockumentary The Calcium Kid, starring Orlando Bloom.

== See also ==
- Harold Lloyd filmography
- List of boxing films
