= Way Up Thar =

1935 film

- Directed by: Mack Sennett
- Release date: November 8, 1935
- Running time: 19 minutes
- Country: United States
- Language: English

Way Up Thar is a 1935 American short western comedy musical film directed by Mack Sennett.

== Cast ==
- Joan Davis ... Jennie Kirk
- Myra Keaton ... Maw Kirk
- John W. Jackson ... Jim Higgins
- June Gittelson ... Sophie Cramer
- Al Lydell ... Sam Higgins
- Richard Cramer ... Cramer
- Louise Keaton ... Liddie
- Sons of the Pioneers ... Hillbilly Band
- Bob Nolan ... Band Member
- Roy Rogers ... Band Member (as Leonard Slye)
- Tim Spencer ... Band Member
- Hugh Farr ... Band Member
