= Ditto (1937 film) =

1937 film

- Directed by: Charles Lamont
- Written by: Paul Gerard Smith
- Produced by: E. H. Allen; E. W. Hammons
- Starring: Buster Keaton
- Cinematography: Dwight Warren
- Production company: Educational Films
- Distributed by: 20th Century Fox
- Release date: February 12, 1937
- Running time: 17 minutes
- Country: United States
- Language: English

Ditto is a 1937 American short comedy film featuring Buster Keaton.

== Plot ==
Buster Keaton plays an ice delivery man who falls in love with one of his customers. He returns that afternoon to collect the final payment from the customer and brings her a small ice sculpture. Little does he know, though, that her twin lives right next door. In a series of visual gags he mistakes the two twins, and thinking that one is being assaulted, he smashes a vase over the head of the husband of one of the twins. Eventually he is kicked out of the houses.

In a barn, the delivery man sulks to his horse. He announces that he will leave to Canada, and return in 15 years. The film cuts to that future, where Buster is a hermit with a long beard. The world has futuristic advances like airplanes with trailers that are flown in tow behind them.

The final sight gag is a visual reference to the Dionne quintuplets, who are first-name checked on the back of camp chairs in which five supposedly identical women are sitting.

== Cast ==
- Buster Keaton as The Forgotten Man
- Gloria Brewster as Housewife
- Barbara Brewster as Housewife's twin sister
- Harold Goodwin as Hank
- Lynton Brent as Bill
- Al Thompson
- Robert Ellsworth

== Production ==
Filming took place in December 1936, and was an opportunistic film made by having access to the identical twins Gloria and Barbara Brewster. This was the twins film debut, and they would go on to appear in nine other films as "The Brewster twins". Buster Keaton had included identical twins in his work before in the 1921 short The Play House.

Buster Keaton was paid $5000 for his role in the film.

== Copyright Status ==
The film's copyright was renewed in 1964, and the work will enter the US public domain in 2033.
