= Village Barn Dance =

- Theatrical release poster
- Directed by: Frank McDonald
- Screenplay by: Dorrell McGowan; Stuart E. McGowan
- Produced by: Armand Schaefer
- Starring: Richard Cromwell; Doris Day; George Barbier; Esther Dale; Robert Baldwin; Andrew Tombes
- Cinematography: Ernest Miller
- Edited by: Murray Seldeen
- Music by: William Lava
- Production company: Republic Pictures
- Distributed by: Republic Pictures
- Release date: January 30, 1940
- Running time: 74 minutes
- Country: United States
- Language: English

Village Barn Dance is a 1940 American comedy film directed by Frank McDonald, written by Dorrell McGowan and Stuart E. McGowan, and starring Richard Cromwell, Doris Day, George Barbier, Esther Dale, Robert Baldwin and Andrew Tombes. It was released on January 30, 1940, by Republic Pictures.

== Cast ==
- Richard Cromwell as Dan Martin
- Doris Day as Betty Withers
- George Barbier as Uncle Si
- Esther Dale as Minerva Withers
- Robert Baldwin as James Rutherford Jr.
- Andrew Tombes as James Rutherford Sr.
- Myrtle Wiseman as Lulu Belle
- Scotty Wiseman as Scotty
- Barbara Jo Allen as Vera
- Frank Cook as Harmonica Player
- Don Wilson as Radio Announcer
- Helen Troy as Singer
