= Fifth Avenue Girl =

1939 comedy film by Gregory La Cava

- Theatrical release poster
- Directed by: Gregory La Cava
- Written by: Allan Scott; Gregory La Cava (uncredited); Morrie Ryskind (uncredited story outline)
- Produced by: Gregory La Cava
- Starring: Ginger Rogers; Walter Connolly; Verree Teasdale; James Ellison
- Cinematography: Robert De Grasse
- Edited by: William Hamilton; Robert Wise
- Music by: Russell Bennett
- Production company: RKO Radio Pictures
- Distributed by: RKO Radio Pictures
- Release date: September 22, 1939
- Running time: 82-83 minutes
- Country: United States
- Language: English
- Budget: $607,000
- Box office: $1,370,000

Fifth Avenue Girl, sometimes stylized as 5th Ave Girl, is a 1939 RKO Radio Pictures comedy film directed by Gregory La Cava and starring Ginger Rogers, Walter Connolly, Verree Teasdale, and James Ellison. The screenplay was written by Allan Scott with uncredited contributions by La Cava and Morris Ryskind.

The film is about a rich industrialist with business problems who feels neglected by his family and hires a young woman to stir things up.

== Plot ==
Wealthy industrialist Timothy Borden has problems both at work and at home. His employees at Amalgamated Pump are making demands that may drive the business that he has built from nothing into bankruptcy. His son Tim, who prefers playing polo, has neglected and lost a major customer. On his birthday, when Timothy returns to his Fifth Avenue mansion, he finds nobody there but the servants. His unfaithful wife Martha, his daughter Katherine and Tim have all forgotten, are busy or do not care.

Feeling lonely, Timothy takes the advice of his butler and visits Central Park, where he meets Mary Grey, a young unemployed woman. He invites her to dine with him at a fancy nightclub. They get drunk, dance and run into Timothy' wife, who is on a date with her usual beau. The next morning, he wakes with a hangover and a black eye, discovering that he had invited Mary to spend the night in a guest room.

Seeing the reaction this elicits from his formerly indifferent family, he hires Mary to pretend to be his mistress. He intentionally neglects his company, thereby forcing his son to take some responsibility. Tim develops fresh new ideas, to save the firm. Timothy and Mary go out every night, pretending to cavort for hours, although they are actually driven around by the ardently communist chauffeur Mike, whom Katherine loves.

Embarrassed by the newspaper gossip columns and shunned by her friends, Martha consults a psychiatrist who finds nothing wrong with her suddenly cheerful and carefree husband. She starts staying home, plotting ways to drive Mary away. Tim, who shows contempt for Mary, unsuccessfully tries to buy her off and eventually falls in love with her. Mary tries to help Katherine with Mike, who does not pay any attention to her. Finally, Martha tries to convince Mary that she has surrendered and that they should all be friends.

In Central Park, Tim kisses Mary, who is upset the next day and wants to leave but is confronted by Tim. Martha and Timothy dine together in the kitchen, which reminds them of when they were young and poor. They page through old photographs, reminiscing about their life together.

Katherine announces that she has married Mike, who has decided to quit and open a repair shop. Martha is aghast, but Timothy reminds her that they had started their own marriage in a similar fashion, and she grudgingly accepts her new son-in-law. When Mary and Tim enter, Timothy feigns rage, but Mary can no longer continue with the charade and tearfully confesses the truth about her arrangement with Timothy. When she leaves, Tim chases her and carries her back into the mansion. When a policeman tries to interfere, Mary tells him to mind his own business.

== Cast ==
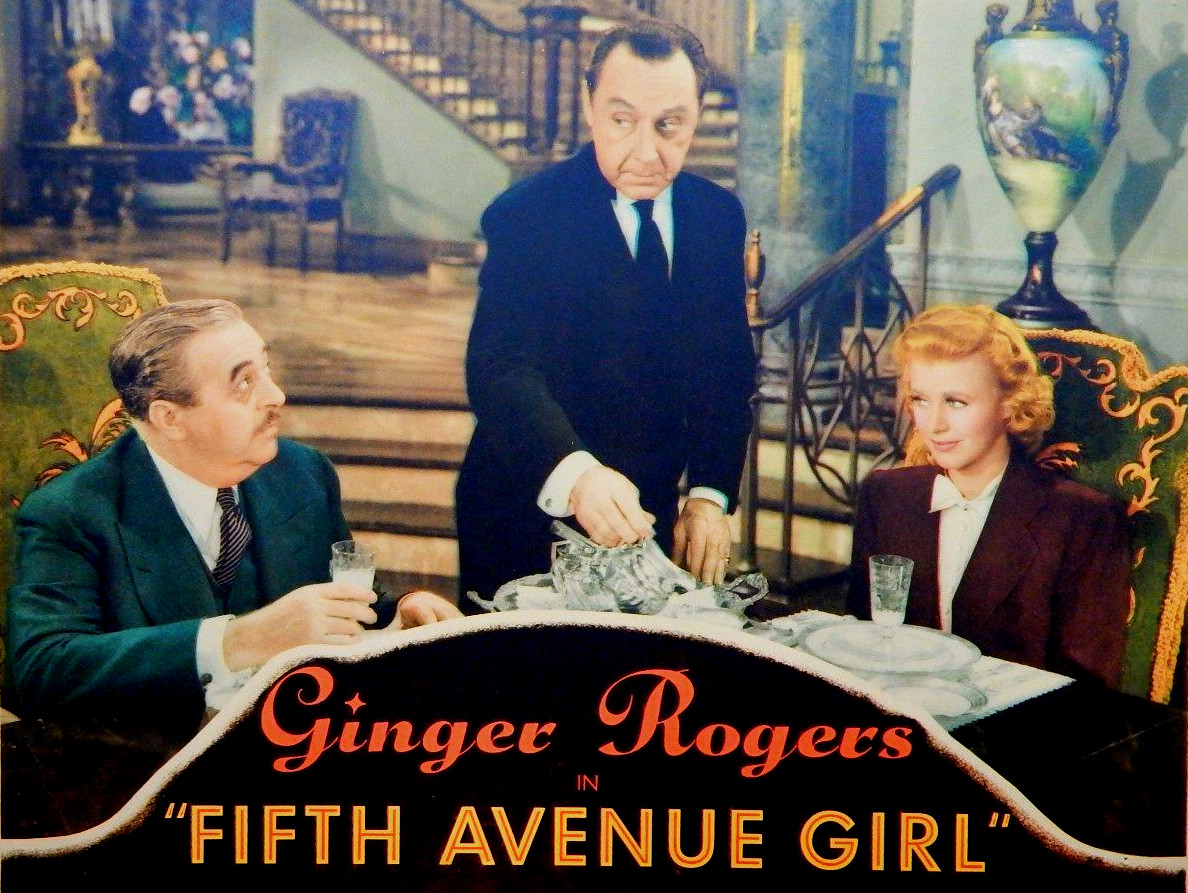
Lobby card: Connelly, Pangborn, Rogers

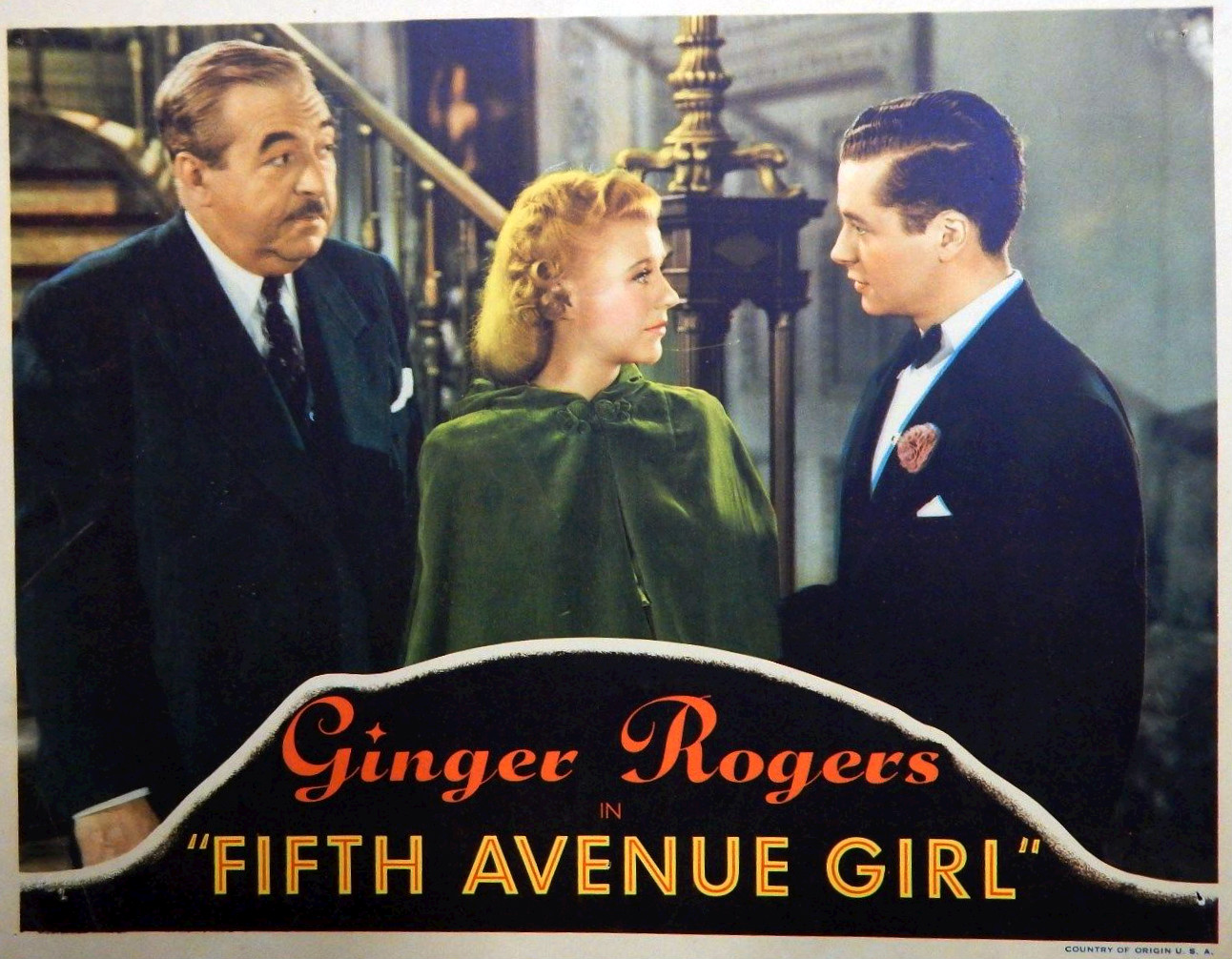
Lobby card: Connelly, Rogers, Holt

- Ginger Rogers as Mary Grey
- Walter Connolly as Timothy Borden
- Verree Teasdale as Martha Borden
- James Ellison as Mike
- Tim Holt as Tim Borden
- Kathryn Adams as Katherine Borden
- Franklin Pangborn as Higgins, the butler
- Ferike Boros as Olga, a maid
- Louis Calhern as Dr. Hugo Kessler
- Theodore von Eltz as Terwilliger
- Alexander D'Arcy as Maitre D'
- Jack Carson as Sailor in Central Park (uncredited)

== Production ==
Production on Fifth Avenue Girl took place from May 20 to June 28, 1939. Retakes took place on August 9, 1939. Principal photography was completed 12 days earlier than scheduled. Working titles for the film were My Fifth Avenue Girl and The Other Half.

Louis Calhern, who plays Dr. Kessler, was originally slated to play the role of Tommy Hopkins that was taken by Cornelius Keefe. Rogers wrote in her memoir that she had "been very impressed with" La Cava's "innovative direction in Stage Door. Greg brought a humanistic feeling to everything, and in Fifth Avenue Girl he adroitly ‘contrasted the spoiled rich with the simple sincerity and warmth of the less fortunate."

The film as presented to preview audiences included a different, unhappy ending with Mary leaving the house and walking down Fifth Avenue. According to Ginger Rogers' autobiography, Rogers vacationed in Honolulu after the filming of Fifth Avenue Girl. A new ending was shot when she returned.

== Reception ==
The New York Times critic Frank Nugent described the film as "cheerful and cheerfully unimportant. It may not be a strikingly good comedy, but then it isn't militantly bad either."

The film was a box-office hit and earned a profit of $314,000.

== Radio adaptations ==
Fifth Avenue Girl was presented on Lux Radio Theater in 1940, starring Ginger Rogers and Edward Arnold. Another version was presented on Hollywood Players on January 1, 1947, with Paulette Goddard playing Mary Gray.
