= Hawaiian Buckaroo =

1938 film by Ray Taylor

- Theatrical release poster
- Directed by: Ray Taylor
- Screenplay by: Daniel Jarrett
- Story by: Daniel Jarrett
- Produced by: Sol Lesser
- Starring: Smith Ballew; Evalyn Knapp; Harry Woods; Pat J. O'Brien; George Regas; Benny Burt
- Cinematography: Allen Q. Thompson
- Edited by: Albert Jordan
- Production company: 20th Century Fox
- Distributed by: 20th Century Fox
- Release date: January 14, 1938
- Running time: 58 minutes
- Country: United States
- Language: English

Hawaiian Buckaroo is a 1938 American Western film directed by Ray Taylor and written by Daniel Jarrett. The film stars Smith Ballew, Evalyn Knapp, Harry Woods, Pat J. O'Brien, George Regas and Benny Burt. The film was released on January 14, 1938, by 20th Century Fox.

== Cast ==
- Smith Ballew as Jeff Howard
- Evalyn Knapp as Paula Harrington
- Harry Woods as J. P. M'Tigue
- Pat J. O'Brien as Steve Wainwright
- George Regas as Regas
- Benny Burt as Mike
- Laura Treadwell as Aunt Julia Fraser

== Adaptation ==
Ballew starred in an adaptation of the film on the CBS radio program Hollywood Showcase on November 14, 1937.
