= Terror Aboard =

1933 film by Paul Sloane

- Theatrical release poster
- Directed by: Paul Sloane
- Screenplay by: Robert Presnell Sr. Manuel Seff; Harvey F. Thew
- Produced by: William LeBaron
- Starring: John Halliday; Charlie Ruggles; Shirley Grey; Neil Hamilton; Jack La Rue; Verree Teasdale; Stanley Fields
- Cinematography: Harry Fischbeck
- Edited by: Eda Warren
- Music by: Herman Hand; John Leipold
- Production company: Paramount Pictures
- Distributed by: Paramount Pictures
- Release date: April 14, 1933
- Running time: 69 minutes
- Country: United States
- Language: English

Terror Aboard is a 1933 American pre-Code horror mystery film directed by Paul Sloane, written by Robert Presnell Sr., Manuel Seff and Harvey F. Thew, and starring John Halliday, Charlie Ruggles, Shirley Grey, Neil Hamilton, Jack La Rue, Verree Teasdale and Stanley Fields. It was released on April 14, 1933, by Paramount Pictures.

== Plot ==
While traveling abroad via his own ship to Sydney, Australia, Maximilian Kreig is wired a notice of impending capture for prosecution of forgery and grand larceny. Knowing that only the communications officer is aware of the wire, Kreig murders him to contain his secret. He convinces the ship captain to dock at American Samoa where he intends to seek refuge from justice with his fiancé Lili Kingston.

Among the passengers are the couple Morton and Millicent Hazlitt, the bachelor Gregory Cordoff, Krieg's chef Luigi, Krieg's steward Blackie Witherspoon, and Lili's maid Lena Klein.

To draw others off his trail, Krieg incites Cordoff to murder Morton after Cordoff and Millicent's affair comes to light. Ultimately, Krieg convinces Cordoff to commit suicide. However, as further suspicions arise, Krieg covertly murders Millicent, Luigi, and Lena.

During the course of these murders, Lili's former fiancé, James Cowles, is found in the ocean by Krieg's ship after his own plane had crashed. While killing Lena, Krieg is seen by Captain Swanson who approaches and accuses Krieg of being behind the murders. Krieg murders him too.

Following all the mysterious deaths, the remaining seamen decide to desert the ship but are killed by Krieg in the process. During this, Lili witness' Krieg's violent act and runs to Cowles for support. Krieg traps Lili and Cowles in the ship's engine room surrounded by flames.

The next morning, another ship comes across Krieg's and discovers the rampage of murders. They save Blackie, Lili, and Cowles as Krieg jumps overboard. Krieg is eaten by a shark and his ship blows up.

== Cast ==
- John Halliday as Maximilian Kreig
- Charlie Ruggles as Blackie Witherspoon
- Shirley Grey as Lili Kingston
- Neil Hamilton as James Cowles
- Jack La Rue as Gregory Cordoff
- Verree Teasdale as Millicent Hazlitt
- Stanley Fields as Capt. Swanson
- Leila Bennett as Lena Klein
- Morgan Wallace as Morton Hazlitt
- Thomas E. Jackson as Capt. Derick Alison
- William Janney as Edward Wilson
- Paul Hurst as Boatswain
- Frank Hagney as First Mate
- Clarence Wilson as Ship's Doctor
- Paul Porcasi as Luigi
- Bobby Dunn as Cross-eyed Sailor
