= The Sap from Syracuse =

1930 film by A. Edward Sutherland

- Theatrical release poster
- Directed by: A. Edward Sutherland
- Screenplay by: Jack O'Donnell; John Wray; John Hayden; Gertrude Purcell
- Starring: Jack Oakie; Ginger Rogers; Granville Bates; George Barbier; Sidney Riggs; Betty Starbuck; Verree Teasdale
- Cinematography: Larry Williams
- Edited by: Helene Turner
- Music by: Vernon Duke (music); Johnny Green (music); Yip Harburg (lyrics)
- Production company: Paramount Pictures
- Distributed by: Paramount Pictures
- Release date: July 26, 1930
- Running time: 68 minutes
- Country: United States
- Language: English

The Sap from Syracuse is a 1930 American pre-Code comedy film directed by A. Edward Sutherland and written by Jack O'Donnell, John Wray, John Hayden and Gertrude Purcell. The film stars Jack Oakie, Ginger Rogers, Granville Bates, George Barbier and Verree Teasdale. It was released on July 26, 1930, by Paramount Pictures. The film was released under the title The Sap from Abroad in the United Kingdom.

== Plot ==
When crane driver Littleton Looney inherits $18,000 from his uncle, he decides to fulfill his dream and board a luxury liner to Europe. His ex-boss Hopkins and a couple of Hopkins' cronies pull a prank by sending telegrams, purportedly from prominent business tycoons, to the ship's captain asking that Looney be treated well. They also convince a senator on board that Looney is Vanderhoff, a famous engineer who is traveling incognito.

Passenger Ellen Saunders has 90 days to place some nickel mines in Macedonia into operation, but she knows nothing about mining. If she does not succeed, she will lose the mines to her guardian, banker Sidney Hycross. When she hears that a noted engineer is aboard, she learns from the senator that it is Looney. Soon the senator has spread the news all over the ship. When Hycross hears it, he assigns Nick Pangolos to keep Ellen away from Looney.

Hycross receives word that the machinery that Ellen needs has been stranded far from the mines. Ellen hears the same news and consults with Looney, and a romance develops between them. Looney is pursued by a gold digger named Flo Goodrich, while her friend Dolly Clark targets Hycross.

Hycross, suspicious of Looney's identity, goads Ellen into a bet: if Looney is not Vanderhoff, she will forfeit the mines to Hycross. When he telegrams the Syracuse chamber of commerce to check on Looney, he receives a glowing recommendation, but Hycross remains unconvinced. In Macedonia, he arranges for engineers working on the mine problem to meet and expose Looney. The machinery cannot be transported to the mines until the September rains raise the level of a river, and that would be too late.

Looney finally confesses to Ellen that he is not an engineer. Upset, she informs Hycross she will cede the mines to him. However, Looney concocts a plan to dam the river so that the stranded machinery may travel over land. Impressed, the senator, who is really Vanderhoff and has been traveling to monitor Hycross, hires Looney.

Looney and Ellen continue their romance in Europe, where he takes a job as a consulting engineer at her mines.

== Cast ==
- Jack Oakie as Littleton Looney
- Ginger Rogers as Ellen Saunders
- Granville Bates as Sidney Hycross
- George Barbier as Senator Powell
- Sidney Riggs as Nick Pangolos
- Betty Starbuck as Flo Goodrich
- Verree Teasdale as Dolly Clark

== Production ==
The film is based on the play of the same name by Jack O'Donnell and John Wray that debuted at the Boulevard Theatre in December 1929 and was retitled So Was Napoleon when it was produced at the Sam H. Harris Theatre in January 1930.

The Sap from Syracuse was partially filmed on location at the Soundview Golf Club in Great Neck, New York.

== Soundtrack ==
- "How I Wish I Could Sing a Love Song"
- "Ah, What's the Use"
- "Capitalize That Thing Called It"
