= Carol Chilton =

American dancer (1907–1996)

- Carol Chilton, from a 1931 newspaper
- Born: December 13, 1907; Chicago, Illinois
- Died: October 27, 1996 (aged 88); Chicago, Illinois, U.S.
- Occupation: Dancer
- Spouse: Maceo Thomas

Carol Chilton Thomas Anthony (December 13, 1907 – October 27, 1996) was an American dancer, part of the duo Chilton and Thomas, with her husband Maceo Thomas. She danced in several films and stage productions, and was one of the "first American artists to be selected for the initial television broadcast in England."

== Early life and education ==
Chilton was born in Chicago, the daughter of Newton T. Chilton and Lucille E. Bacon Chilton. Both parents were part of the Great Migration from the American South to Northern cities; her mother was a probation officer and her father was a carpenter. She trained as a dancer in Chicago.

== Career ==
Chilton was performing as a dancer and singer in Chicago from her teens. She and Thomas began touring together as a "fancy dance act" by early 1927. They were often billed as "Creole dancers". Theirs are really winged feet," commented an Iowa newspaper in 1929. "That seems to be the only solution for the rapidity of their motion. They apparently dance on the air." In 1933 they had a novelty act that involved Chilton playing piano while Thomas danced on dinner plates.

Chilton and Thomas danced in the films Love and Hisses (1937) and Strike Me Pink (1936). The appeared on Broadway with Al Jolson and Eddie Cantor. They toured in California with comedian Fanny Brice in 1928, and performed in England during four tours between 1930 and 1937, including a performance for the King and Queen, early live television broadcasts for the BBC, and appearances with jazz musician Valaida Snow in 1936. They danced in France with the Blackbirds of 1934 company, but they left in a contract dispute, and they were sued by the French impresario Felix Terry. In 1938 they toured in Australia and the Far East. One of their last performances together was at the opening of the Idlewild resort in Michigan in 1941. They also played USO shows in their last years together.

Both Thomas and Chilton stopped dancing by 1943. During World War II, Chilton worked at an aircraft factory in Chicago.

== Personal life ==
Chilton married her dancing partner, Maceo Thomas, in 1927. They divorced in the early 1940s, and both soon remarried. She married again in 1943, to Louis Fite Anthony; they had three children, Carol, Stephen, and Pamela. Her second husband died in 1987. She died in Chicago in 1996, at the age of 88.
