= Verree Teasdale =

American actress (1903–1987)

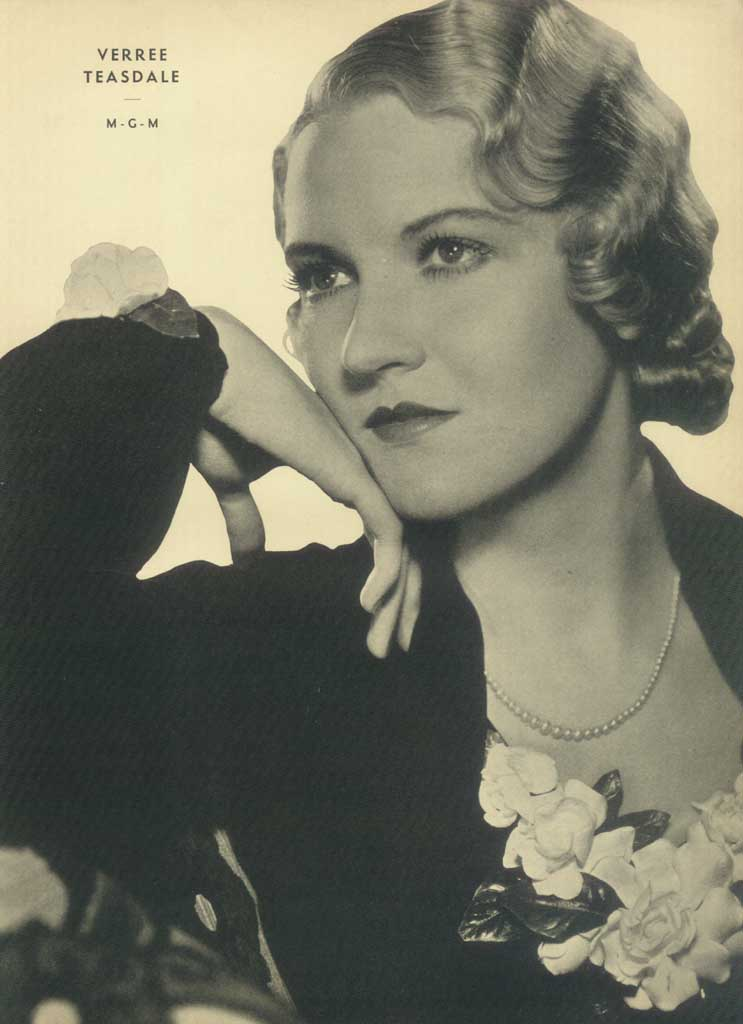
- Teasdale, c. 1933
- Born: March 15, 1903; Spokane, Washington, U.S.
- Died: February 17, 1987 (aged 83); Culver City, California, U.S.
- Other names: Veree Teasdale; Marion O'Neal
- Occupation: Actress
- Years active: 1924–c.1950
- Spouses: William J. O'Neal (m. 1927; div. 1933) Adolphe Menjou (m. 1934; died 1963)
- Children: 1

Verree Teasdale (March 15, 1903 – February 17, 1987) was an American actress born in Spokane, Washington.

== Early years ==
A cousin to poet Sara Teasdale and second cousin of Edith Wharton, Teasdale attended Erasmus Hall High School in Brooklyn and trained as a stage actress with the Institute Players at the Academy of Music.

== Career ==
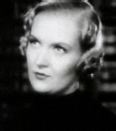
Frame from First Lady (1937)

Teasdale debuted on Broadway, straight from the Institute Players, as the "caustic-tongued poseur" Augusta Winslow Martin in The Youngest (1924). She performed regularly on Broadway until 1932.

After co-starring in Somerset Maugham's play The Constant Wife with Ethel Barrymore in 1926–1927, she was offered a film contract, and her first film, Syncopation, was released in 1929. Teasdale appeared older than her physical age, which enabled her to play bored society wives, scheming other women and second leads in comedies such as Roman Scandals (1933). In 1935, she played Hippolyta in A Midsummer Night's Dream.

== Personal life and death ==
Teasdale married actor William O'Neal in 1927, and they divorced in 1933. In 1934, she married actor Adolphe Menjou, and they remained together until his death in 1963. Teasdale and Menjou appeared together in two films, The Milky Way in 1936 and Turnabout in 1940, and were co-hosts of a syndicated radio program in the late 1940s and early 1950s. A June 19, 1949, review by Jack Gould in The New York Times said Meet the Menjous "easily is among the most literate and enjoyable items on the daytime schedule".

Teasdale retired after the radio program finished its run, keeping busy with her hobby of costume design. She died on February 17, 1987, in Culver City, California.

== Broadway theater ==
- The Youngest, from December 22, 1924, to March 23, 1925 – Augusta Winslow Martin
- The Morning After, from July 27, 1925, to August 1925 – Mrs. Madera
- The Master of the Inn, from December 21, 1925, to January 1926 – Harriet Norton
- Buy, Buy, Baby, from October 7, 1926, to October 1926 – Pauline Lunt
- The Constant Wife, from November 29, 1926, to August 13, 1927 – Marie-Louise Durham
- By Request, from September 27, 1928, to October 1928 – Claudia Wynn
- Precious, from January 14, 1929, to February 1929 – Sonia
- Nice Women, from June 10, 1929, to August 1929 – Dorothy Drew
- Soldiers and Women, from September 2, 1929, to October 1929 – Helen Arnold
- The Royal Virgin, from March 17, 1930, to March 1930 – The Countess of Nottingham
- The Greeks Had a Word for It, from September 25, 1930, to May 1931 – Jean
- Marriage for Three, from November 11, 1931, to November 1931 – Peggy Howard
- Experience Unnecessary, from December 30, 1931, to February 1932 – Theda Thompson

== Complete filmography ==
- Syncopation (1929) – Rita Eliot
- Her New Chauffeur (1929, Short)
- Hunt the Tiger (1929, Short)
- The Ninety-Ninth Amendment (1929, Short)
- The Sap from Syracuse (1930) – Dolly Clark
- Mr. Intruder (1930, Short) – The Wife
- Skyscraper Souls (1932) – Sarah Dennis
- Payment Deferred (1932) – Mme. Collins
- They Just Had to Get Married (1932) – Lola Montrose
- Luxury Liner (1933) – Luise Marheim
- Terror Aboard (1933) – Millicent Hazlitt
- Love, Honor, and Oh Baby! (1933) – Elsie Carpenter
- Goodbye Love (1933) – Phyllis Van Kamp aka Fanny Malone
- Roman Scandals (1933) – Empress Agrippa
- Fashions of 1934 (1934) – Mabel McGuire aka The Duchess
- A Modern Hero (1934) – Lady Claire Benston
- Madame DuBarry (1934) – Duchess de Granmont
- Dr. Monica (1934) – Anna
- Desirable (1934) – Helen
- The Firebird (1934) – Carola Pointer
- A Midsummer Night's Dream (1935) – Hippolyta, Queen of the Amazons
- The Milky Way (1936) – Ann Westley
- First Lady (1937) – Irene Hibbard
- Topper Takes a Trip (1938) – Mrs. Parkhurst
- Fifth Avenue Girl (1939) – Martha Borden
- I Take This Woman (1940) – Madame Marcesca
- Turnabout (1940) – Laura Bannister
- Love Thy Neighbor (1940) – Barbara Allen
- Come Live with Me (1941) – Diana Kendrick (final film role)
