= There's a Lull in My Life =

1937 song by Mack Gordon and Harry Revel

Single by Alice Faye

from the album Wake Up and Live
- B-side: "Wake Up and Live"
- Released: 1937
- Genre: Traditional pop
- Length: 3:09
- Label: Brunswick
- Composer: Harry Revel
- Lyricist: Mack Gordon

"There's a Lull in My Life" is a 1937 song with lyrics by Mack Gordon and music by Harry Revel, written for the film Wake Up and Live. A "torch ballad", it was released in 1937 as a single and became Alice Faye's only major hit record. Other popular versions from 1937 were by Teddy Wilson (vocal by Helen Ward), George Hall and His Orchestra, and Duke Ellington (with a vocal by Ivie Anderson).

It has also been performed by Nat King Cole, Natalie Cole, Ella Fitzgerald, Chet Baker, Kurt Hohenberger, Johnny Hartman, Anita O'Day, Kay Starr, Diane Keaton and Tony Bennett.
