= George Barbier (actor) =

American actor (1864–1945)

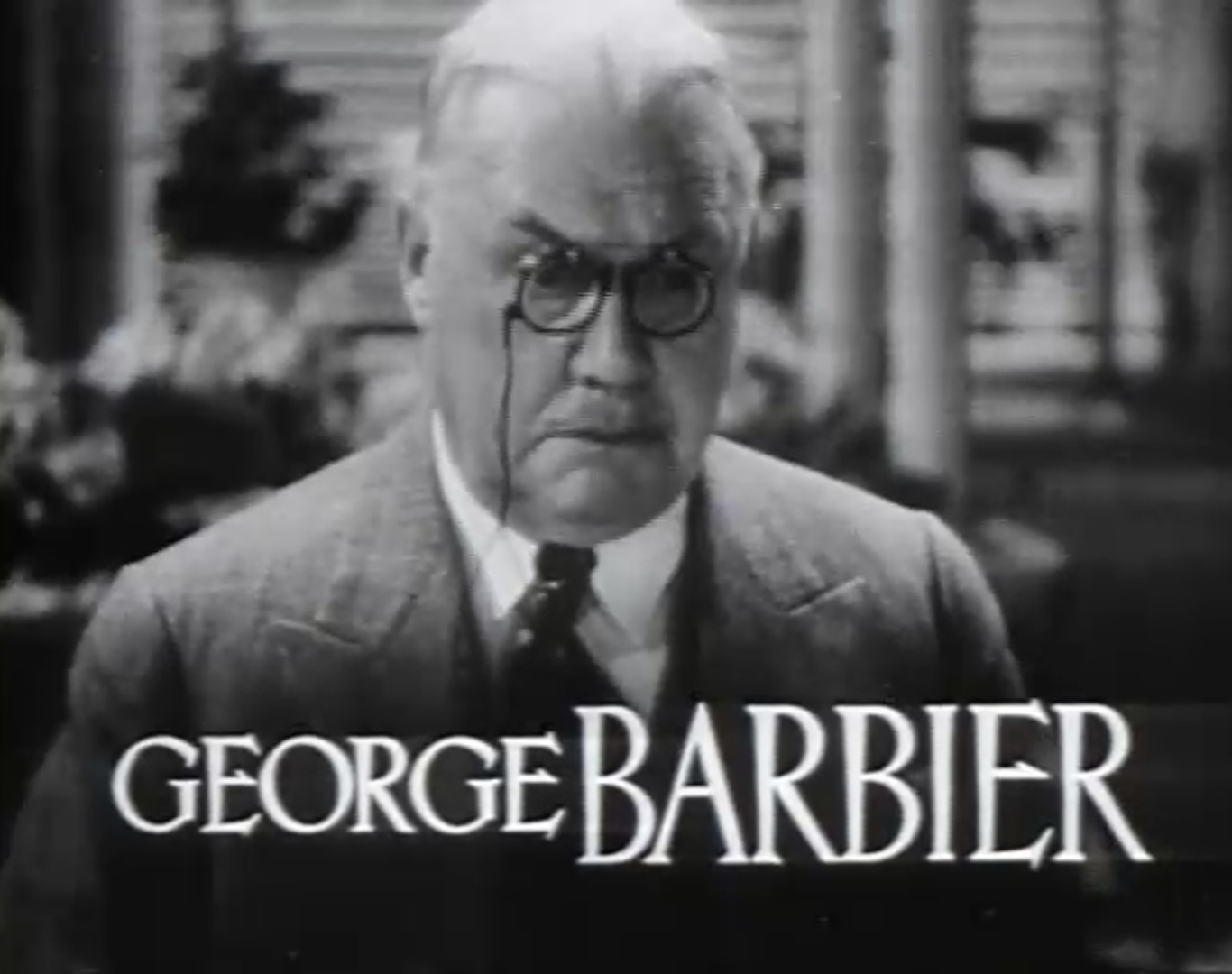
- Barbier in the trailer for It's Love I'm After (1937)
- Born: George W. Barbier; November 19, 1864; Philadelphia, Pennsylvania, U.S.
- Died: July 19, 1945 (aged 80); Hollywood, California, U.S.
- Occupation: Actor
- Years active: 1900–1945
- Spouse: Caroline Thatcher (m. 1887; died 1939)

George W. Barbier (November 19, 1864 – July 19, 1945) was an American stage and film actor who appeared in 88 films.

== Early life and education ==
Barbier was born in Philadelphia, Pennsylvania. He entered the Crozer Theological Seminary in Upland, Pennsylvania to study for the ministry but gave it up to go on the stage.

== Career ==
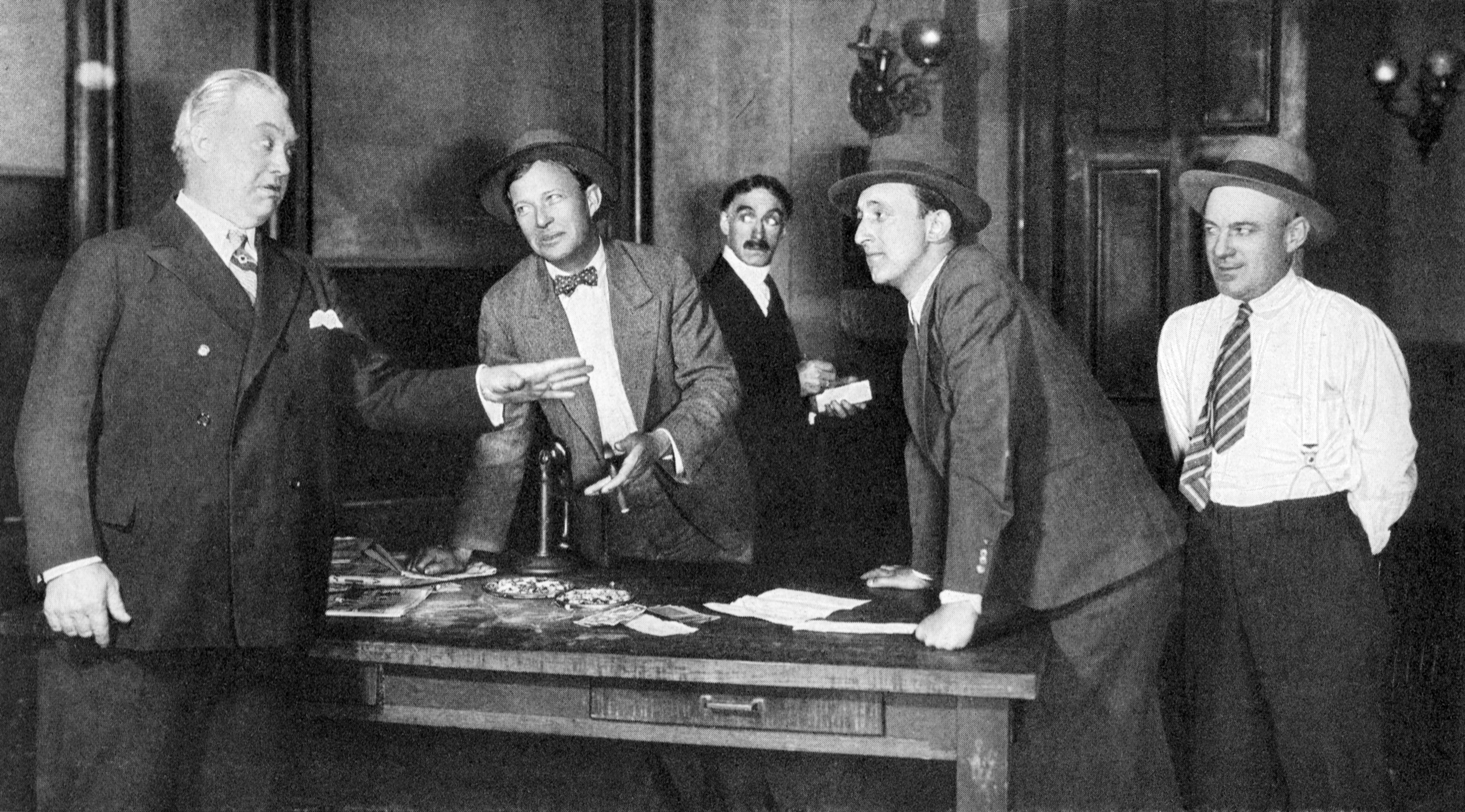
George Barbier, Willard Robertson, Claude Cooper, Allen Jenkins and William Foran in the original Broadway production of The Front Page (1928)

Barbier began his career in light opera and spent several years in repertory and stock companies. He eventually played on Broadway, where he appeared in seven productions between 1922 and 1930, among them The Hunchback of Notre Dame, The Front Page and The Man Who Came Back.

He signed a contract with Paramount Pictures in 1929 and later worked as a character actor for most of the major studios. His first film was The Big Pond (1930). The weighty, white-haired Barbier often played pompous, but mostly kind-hearted businessmen or patriarchs in supporting roles. George Barbier appeared in 88 films until his death in 1945.

== Personal life ==
Barbier married Caroline "Carrie" Thatcher (June 1868, Pennsylvania – June 8, 1939), a stage actress; theirs was reportedly "one of the most successful marriages in Hollywood."

Barbier was originally interred at the Hollywood Forever Cemetery in Los Angeles, California but was disinterred and reburied in Philadelphia, Pennsylvania.

== Complete filmography ==
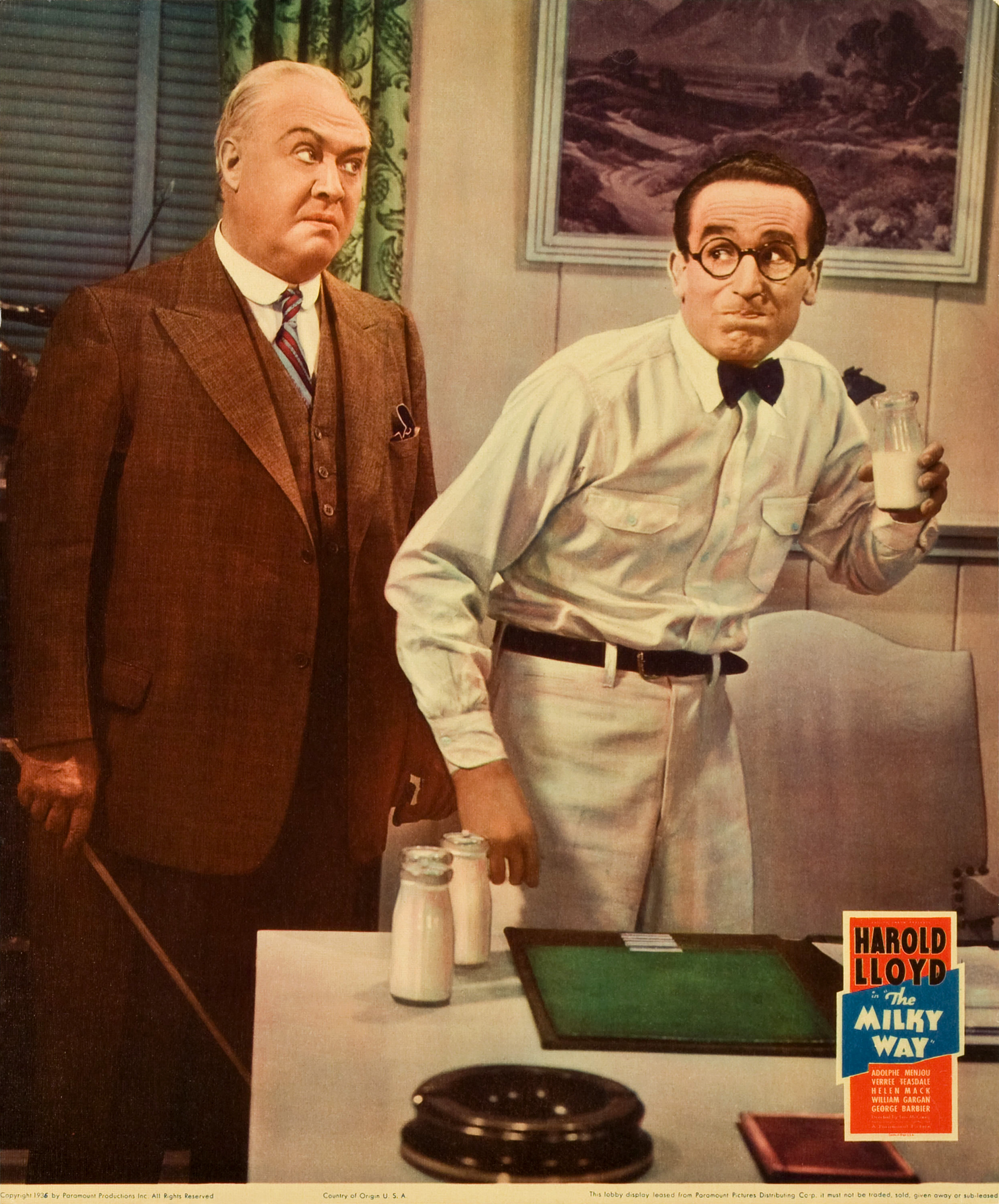
George Barbier with Harold Lloyd in The Milky Way

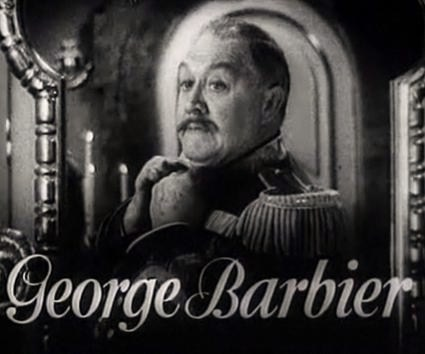
George Barbier in The Merry Widow trailer

- The Big Pond (1930) as Mr. Billings
- The Sap from Syracuse (1930) as Senator Powell
- The Smiling Lieutenant (1931) as King Adolf XV
- 24 Hours (1931) as Hector Champion
- Girls About Town (1931) as Webster
- Touchdown (1931) as Jerome Gehring
- No One Man (1932) as Alfred Newbold
- Strangers in Love (1932) as Mr. Merrow
- One Hour with You (1932) as Police Commissioner
- The Broken Wing (1932) as Luther Farley
- The Strange Case of Clara Deane (1932) as Richard Ware
- Million Dollar Legs (1932) as Mr. Baldwin
- Skyscraper Souls (1932) as Charlie Norton
- Madame Racketeer (1932) as Warden George Waddell (uncredited)
- The Phantom President (1932) as Boss Jim Ronkton
- The Big Broadcast (1932) as Clapsaddle
- Evenings for Sale (1932) as Henrich Fischer
- No Man of Her Own (1932) as Mr. Randall
- Hello, Everybody! (1933) as Mr. Blair
- A Lady's Profession (1933) as James Garfield
- Under the Tonto Ridge (1933) as Weston
- A Bedtime Story (1933) as Toy Seller
- Sunset Pass (1933) as Judge
- Mama Loves Papa (1933) as Mr. Kirkwood
- Turn Back the Clock (1933) as Pete Evans
- This Day and Age (1933) as Judge Michael Maguire
- Love, Honor, and Oh Baby! (1933) as Jasper B. Ogden
- Tillie and Gus (1933) as Captain Fogg
- Miss Fane's Baby Is Stolen (1934) as MacCready
- Journal of a Crime (1934) as Chautard
- Many Happy Returns (1934) as Horatio Allen
- The Cat's-Paw (1934) as Jake Mayo
- Elmer and Elsie (1934) as John Kincaid
- Ladies Should Listen (1934) as Joseph Flamberg
- She Loves Me Not (1934) as J. Thorval Jones
- The Merry Widow (1934) as King Achmed II
- College Rhythm (1934) as John P. Stacey
- McFadden's Flats (1935) as Mr. Hall
- Life Begins at 40 (1935) as Colonel Joseph Ambercrombie
- Hold 'Em Yale (1935) as Mr. Van Cleve
- Broadway Gondolier (1935) as Music Critic Hayward
- Old Man Rhythm (1935) as John Roberts Sr.
- The Crusades (1935) as Sancho, King of Navarre
- Hollywood Extra Girl (1935, Documentary Short) (uncredited)
- Here Comes Cookie (1935) as Harrison Allen
- Millions in the Air (1935) as Calvin Keller
- The Milky Way (1936) as Wilbur Austin
- The Preview Murder Mystery (1936) as Jerome Hewitt
- Wife vs. Secretary (1936) as J. D. Underwood
- The Princess Comes Across (1936) as Captain Nichols
- Early to Bed (1936) as Horace Stanton
- Spendthrift (1936) as Uncle Morton Middleton
- Three Married Men (1936) as Mr. Carey
- On the Avenue (1937) as Commodore Caraway
- Waikiki Wedding (1937) as J. P. Todhunter
- Hotel Haywire (1937) as I. Ketts
- It's Love I'm After (1937) as William West
- A Girl with Ideas (1937) as John Morton
- Tarzan's Revenge (1938) as Roger Reed
- The Adventures of Marco Polo (1938) as Kublai Khan
- Hold That Kiss (1938) as Mr. Piermont
- Little Miss Broadway (1938) as Fiske
- My Lucky Star (1938) as George Cabot Sr.
- Hold That Co-ed (1938) as Major Hubert Breckenridge
- Straight, Place and Show(1938) as Mr. Drake
- Sweethearts (1938) as Benjamin Silver
- Thanks for Everything (1938) as Joe Raines
- Wife, Husband and Friend (1939) as Major Blair
- S.O.S. Tidal Wave (1939) as Uncle Dan Carter
- News Is Made at Night (1939) as Clanahan
- Smuggled Cargo (1939) as C.P. Franklin
- Remember? (1939) as Mr. McIntyre
- Village Barn Dance (1940) as Uncle Si
- The Return of Frank James (1940) as Judge
- Repent at Leisure (1941) as Robert Cornelius 'R.C,' Baldwin
- Million Dollar Baby (1941) as Marlin
- Sing Another Chorus (1941) as Arthur Peyton
- Week-End in Havana (1941) as Walter McCracken
- Marry the Boss's Daughter (1941) as J. W. Barrett
- The Man Who Came to Dinner (1942) as Dr. E. Bradley
- Song of the Islands (1942) as Jefferson Harper Sr.
- Yankee Doodle Dandy (1942) as A. L. Erlanger
- The Magnificent Dope (1942) as James Roger Barker
- Thunder Birds (1942) as Col. Cyrus P. 'Gramps' Saunders
- Hello, Frisco, Hello (1943) as Col. Weatherby (uncredited)
- Week-End Pass (1944) as Commander "Paps' Bradley
- Her Lucky Night (1945) as J.L. Wentworth
- Blonde Ransom (1945) as Uncle William Morrison (final film role)
