= I Married Joan =

Television series

- I Married Joan intro screen
- Genre: Sitcom
- Starring: Joan Davis; Jim Backus
- Theme music composer: Richard Mack
- Opening theme: "I Married Joan"
- Composer: Roger Wagner Chorale
- Country of origin: United States
- Original language: English
- No. of seasons: 3
- No. of episodes: 98

Production
- Executive producers: Joan Davis; James Bank
- Producers: P. J. Wolfson; Richard Mack
- Running time: 25 minutes

Original release
- Network: NBC
- Release: October 15, 1952 – March 23, 1955

I Married Joan is an American sitcom that aired on NBC from 1952 to 1955. It stars actress Joan Davis as the manic, scatterbrained wife of a mild-mannered community judge (Jim Backus).

== Synopsis ==
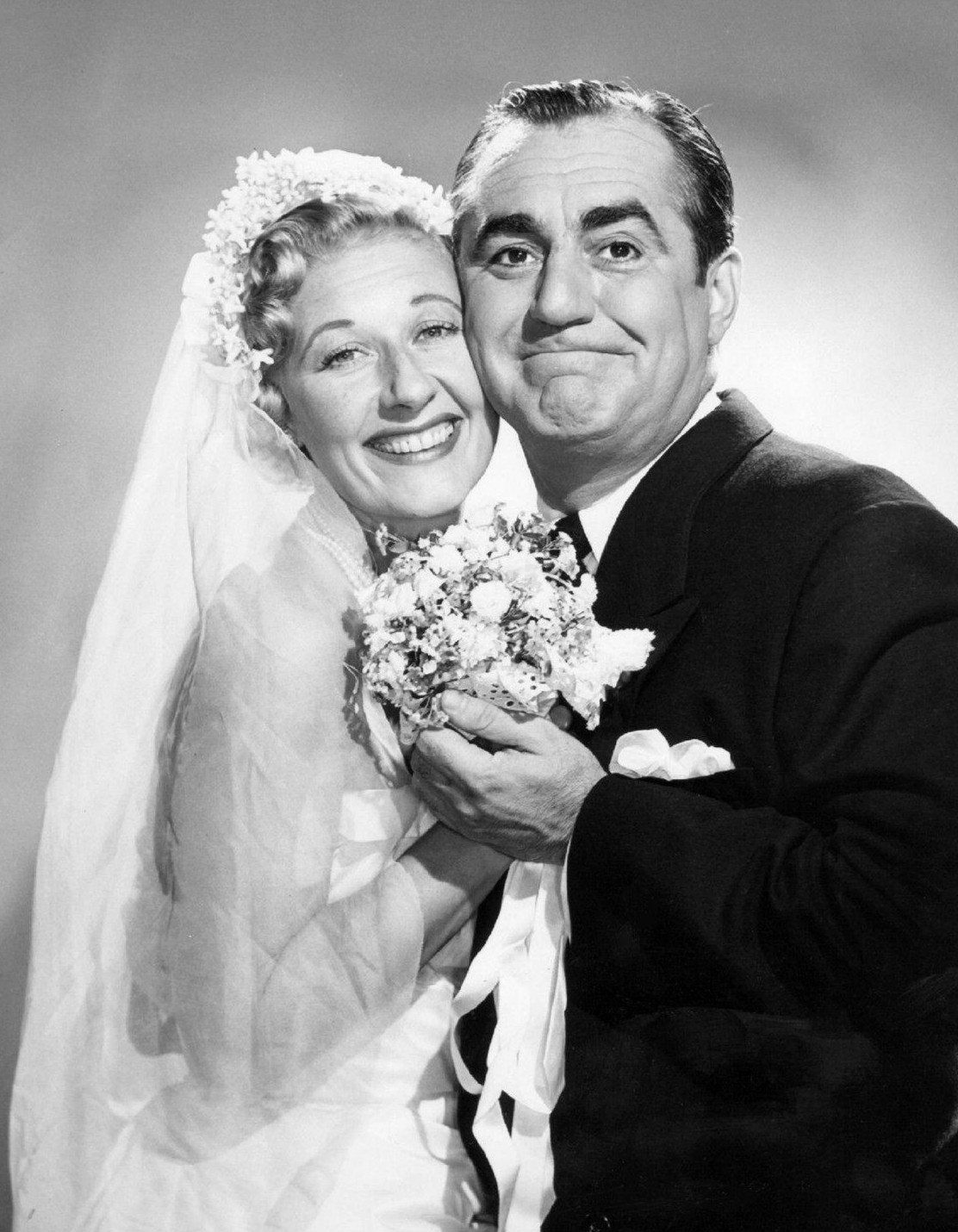
Joan Davis and Jim Backus

The show, whose syndicated opening makes the claim "America's favorite comedy show, starring America's queen of comedy, Joan Davis, as Mrs. Joan Stevens" focused on a married couple, Joan and Bradley Stevens. I Married Joan's trademark was broad physical slapstick, with Joan Stevens portrayed as bright but somewhat childlike and given to misunderstanding. Virtually every episode had a plot which provided star Davis with a setup for at least one scene of over-the-top physical comedy.

Davis's real-life daughter, Beverly Wills, was a regular cast member for several months of the show's second season, portraying Joan's sister, Beverly Grossman. Early installments began with Backus, as Judge Stevens in chambers, recalling how one of his wife's madcap mishaps paralleled the problems of a couple seeking a divorce; this was followed by the unfolding of the episode, which ended back in chambers with Judge Stevens summing up his tale for the now-reconciled couple. This wraparound scenario was abandoned after a handful of episodes.

Sponsored by General Electric (original network openings extolled the virtues of the sponsor's products rather than those of its star), I Married Joan was aimed at the viewers who watched I Love Lucy, which had debuted the previous year and was already television's top-rated situation comedy; it was considered by many as an I Love Lucy knock-off and not seen favourably in comparison. I Love Lucy and I Married Joan even employed the same director in each show's first season, Marc Daniels.

NBC scheduled I Married Joan Wednesdays at 8:00 ET against the first half of Arthur Godfrey and His Friends on CBS for the entirety of its three-season run. The show performed marginally during its first year, but enjoyed a surge in the Nielsen ratings during its second season in the wake of Godfrey's firing of Julius LaRosa and the resultant negative publicity.

In its third year, I Married Joan withered against the additional competition of ABC's new top-rated hit Walt Disney's Disneyland and was canceled, airing its last first-run episode on March 23, 1955. Davis' personal health problems were cited as a reason for the show's cancellation. Although she was later seen performing robust physical comedy as a guest star on variety series for several years after her own show ended, she died in 1961 at age 48 of an apparent heart attack.

== Cast ==
- Joan Davis as Joan Stevens
- Jim Backus as Bradley Stevens
- Hope Emerson as Minerva Parker (pilot only)
- Elvia Allman as Aunt Vera
- Sandra Gould as Mildred Webster
- Beverly Wills as Beverly Grossman
- Hal Smith as Charlie Henderson
- Geraldine Carr as Mabel Henderson
- Wally Brown as Wally
- Sally Kelly as Sally
- Sheila Bromley as Janet Tobin
- Dan Tobin as Kerwin Tobin

== Episodes ==
=== Season 1 (1952–53) ===
No. overall	No. in season	Title	Directed by	Written by	Original release date
1	1	"Pilot"	Philip Rapp	Phil Sharp & Arthur Stander	October 15, 1952
2	2	"Career"	Hal Walker	Phil Sharp & Arthur Stander	October 22, 1952
3	3	"Ballet"	Hal Walker	Phil Sharp & Arthur Stander	October 29, 1952
4	4	"Jitterbug"	Hal Walker	Richard Powell, Phil Sharp & Arthur Stander	November 5, 1952
5	5	"Crime Panel"	Hal Walker	Phil Sharp, Arthur Stander & Frank Tarloff	November 12, 1952
6	6	"Brad's Class Reunion"	Marc Daniels	Phil Sharp & Arthur Stander	November 19, 1952
7	7	"Hunting"	Marc Daniels	Phil Sharp & Arthur Stander	November 26, 1952
8	8	"Joan's Curiosity"	Marc Daniels	Phil Sharp, Arthur Stander & Frank Tarloff	December 3, 1952
9	9	"Birthday"	Marc Daniels	Phil Sharp, Arthur Stander & Frank Tarloff	December 10, 1952
10	10	"Bazaar Pie"	Marc Daniels	Phil Sharp, Arthur Stander & Frank Tarloff	December 17, 1952
11	11	"Dreams"	Ezra Stone	Unknown	December 24, 1952
12	12	"Acrobats"	Ezra Stone	Unknown	December 31, 1952
13	13	"Bad Boy"	Ezra Stone	Unknown	January 7, 1953
14	14	"Circumstantial Evidence"	Unknown	Unknown	January 14, 1953
15	15	"Uncle Edgar"	Marc Daniels	Richard Powell, Sol Saks & Arthur Stander	January 21, 1953
16	16	"Moosehead"	Marc Daniels	Unknown	January 28, 1953
17	17	"Fireman"	Unknown	Arthur Stander, Ben Starr & Frank Tarloff	February 4, 1953
18	18	"Memory"	Unknown	Unknown	February 11, 1953
19	19	"Draft Board"	Unknown	Unknown	February 18, 1953
20	20	"Opera"	Marc Daniels	Unknown	February 25, 1953
21	21	"Shopping"	Unknown	Unknown	March 4, 1953
22	22	"The Stamp"	Marc Daniels	Arthur Stander, Ben Starr & Frank Tarloff	March 11, 1953
23	23	"Little Girl"	Unknown	Unknown	March 18, 1953
24	24	"Diet"	Marc Daniels	Arthur Stander, Ben Starr & Frank Tarloff	March 25, 1953
25	25	"Model"	Marc Daniels	Arthur Stander, Ben Starr & Frank Tarloff	April 1, 1953
26	26	"Lateness"	Marc Daniels	Sherwood Schwartz, Arthur Stander & Frank Tarloff	April 8, 1953
27	27	"Eviction"	Unknown	Unknown	April 15, 1953
28	28	"The Recipe"	Marc Daniels	Sherwood Schwartz & Arthur Stander	April 22, 1953
29	29	"Repairs"	Marc Daniels	Sherwood Schwartz & Arthur Stander	April 29, 1953
30	30	"Secrets"	Unknown	Unknown	May 6, 1953
31	31	"The Artist Show"	John Rich	Jesse Goldstein, Sherwood Schwartz & Phil Sharp	May 13, 1953
32	32	"The Threat"	Unknown	Unknown	May 20, 1953
33	33	"Country Club"	Marc Daniels	Sherwood Schwartz & Arthur Stander	May 27, 1953
34	34	"Theatrical Can-Can"	Marc Daniels	Sherwood Schwartz & Arthur Stander	June 3, 1953
35	35	"Neighbors"	Ezra Stone	Unknown	June 10, 1953
36	36	"Talent Scout"	Ezra Stone	Unknown	June 17, 1953
37	37	"Honeymoon"	Ezra Stone	Unknown	June 24, 1953
38	38	"Business Executive"	Marc Daniels	Bob Fisher, Alan Lipscott & Arthur Stander	July 1, 1953
39	39	"Broken Toe"	Ezra Stone	Unknown	July 8, 1953

=== Season 2 (1953–54) ===
No. overall	No. in season	Title	Original release date
40	1	"Brad's Moustache"	October 14, 1953
41	2	"First Lie"	October 21, 1953
42	3	"Furniture Quick Changes"	October 28, 1953
43	4	"Sister Pat"	November 4, 1953
44	5	"Tropical Fish"	November 11, 1953
45	6	"Culinary Nightmare"	November 18, 1953
46	7	"Initiation"	November 25, 1953
47	8	"Bev's Boyfriend"	December 2, 1953
48	9	"Lost Check"	December 9, 1953
49	10	"The Shotgun"	December 16, 1953
50	11	"The Musical"	December 23, 1953
51	12	"Double Wedding"	December 30, 1953
52	13	"Superstition"	January 6, 1954
53	14	"Barbecue"	January 13, 1954
54	15	"Mothers-in-Law"	January 20, 1954
55	16	"Mabel's Dress"	January 27, 1954
56	17	"Monkeyshines"	February 3, 1954
57	18	"Bev's Mistaken Marriage"	February 10, 1954
58	19	"Missing Witnesses"	February 17, 1954
59	20	"Anniversary Memo"	February 24, 1954
60	21	"Dented Fender"	March 3, 1954
61	22	"Mountain Lodge"	March 10, 1954
62	23	"Home of the Week"	March 17, 1954
63	24	"Pop Retires"	March 24, 1954
64	25	"Changing Houses"	March 31, 1954
65	26	"Jealousy"	April 7, 1954
66	27	"Get Rich Quick"	April 14, 1954
67	28	"Masquerade"	April 21, 1954
68	29	"The Milkman Cometh"	April 28, 1954
69	30	"Predictions"	May 19, 1954
70	31	"Brad's Initiation"	June 9, 1954
71	32	"Confidence"	June 23, 1954
72	33	"Joan's Haircut"	July 7, 1954

=== Season 3 (1954–55) ===
No. overall	No. in season	Title	Original release date
73	1	"New House"	September 29, 1954
74	2	"Party Line"	October 6, 1954
75	3	"Wall Safe"	October 13, 1954
76	4	"Alienation of Affections"	October 20, 1954
77	5	"Bombay Duck"	October 27, 1954
78	6	"Clothes Budget"	November 3, 1954
79	7	"Dancing Lessons"	November 10, 1954
80	8	"Two Saint Bernards"	November 17, 1954
81	9	"Manhole Cover"	November 24, 1954
82	10	"The Farm"	December 1, 1954
83	11	"Home Movies"	December 8, 1954
84	12	"Big Louie's Parole"	December 15, 1954
85	13	"Crazy Toes Smith"	December 22, 1954
86	14	"Joan the Matchmaker"	December 29, 1954
87	15	"The Wedding"	January 5, 1955
88	16	"The Maid"	January 12, 1955
89	17	"Money in the Shotgun"	January 19, 1955
90	18	"Eye Glasses"	January 26, 1955
91	19	"The Allergy"	February 2, 1955
92	20	"Lieutenant General"	February 9, 1955
93	21	"The Letter"	February 16, 1955
94	22	"Ladies Prison"	February 23, 1955
95	23	"The Lady and the Prizefighter"	March 2, 1955
96	24	"How to Win Friends"	March 9, 1955
97	25	"The Cowboy"	March 16, 1955
98	26	"The Jail Bird"	March 23, 1955

== Release ==
=== Syndication ===
In the early 1980s, the series was rerun by the CBN cable network in a late-night block that included another 1950s TV sitcom, Gale Storm's series My Little Margie. The series was also aired on ION Television, and on the HOT (History of Television) network in New York (WKOB 42.4) and Dallas (KODF 26 and K31GL 31.3). The series currently (as of 2018) runs on AMGTV, also in a block with My Little Margie. Beginning in March 2018, the series began a weekday morning run on the Decades network.

=== Home media ===
Since 2004, VCI Entertainment has released 5 volumes of various episodes from different seasons on budget DVD compilations.

== Other media ==
BearManor Media published a biography about Joan Davis, which includes a chapter dedicated to I Married Joan. Episodes of the series have been screened at the Mid-Atlantic Nostalgia Convention held annually in Aberdeen, Maryland.
