= Fight for Freedom (disambiguation) =

Fight for Freedom may refer to:

- "Fight for Freedom", a 1941 song by Harold Levey.
- Fight For Freedom, FFF, a gang from the San Fernando Valley, California, US
- Fight for Freedom, a World War II-era predecessor of Freedom House
- The Fight for Freedom, a 1908 film by D.W. Griffith
- Gladiator: Fight for Freedom, the first novel in the Gladiator book series by Simon Scarrow
- Hidden & Dangerous: Fight for Freedom, an expansion for the Hidden & Dangerous video game.
- Fighting for Freedom, 2013 American drama film written by Chris Loken and directed by Farhad Mann. Starring Kristanna Loken, Bruce Dern, José María Yazpik and Patricia De León.
- Fighting for Freedom: The Ukrainian Volunteer Division of the Waffen-SS, a book by Richard Landwehr
- Fighting for Freedom, a 1906 play by Anthony E. Wills
- Churchill and Orwell: The Fight for Freedom, book by Thomas E. Ricks
- "Fight for Freedom", an episode of the anime television series Yu-Gi-Oh! Arc-V

== See also ==
- Bach's Fight for Freedom, a 1995 film
- Mandela's Fight for Freedom, known as Death of Apartheid, a three-part documentary series by BBC
- Winter on Fire: Ukraine's Fight for Freedom, a 2015 documentary film
- Freedom on Fire: Ukraine's Fight for Freedom, a 2023 documentary film
- DGUSA Freedom Fight, a pay-per-view professional wrestling event
- Freedom Fighters (disambiguation)
- Flight for Freedom, a 1943 film starring Rosalind Russell and Fred MacMurray about Amelia Earhart
