= Life Begins at Forty (disambiguation) =

Life Begins at Forty is a 1932 self-help book by Walter B. Pitkin.

Life Begins at Forty may also refer to:

== Film and TV ==
- Life Begins at 40 (film), a 1935 American film starring Will Rogers
- Life Begins at Forty (2003 TV series), a TVB series in Cantonese which aired from 2003 to 2004
- Life Begins at Forty (1978 TV series), a Yorkshire Television sitcom starring Derek Nimmo, which aired from 1978 to 1980

== Music ==
- "Life Begins at 40" (song), a song by John Lennon
- "Life Begins at Forty", a 1937 song by Sophie Tucker
- "Life Begins at Forty" (song), a 1983 song from Dave and the Dynamos
