= Bubbling Over =

Bubbling Over may refer to:

- Bubbling Over (album), a 1973 Dolly Parton music album
- Bubbling Over (horse), a thoroughbred racehorse
- Bubbling Over (1921 film), an American comedy short film starring "Snub" Pollard and Marie Mosquini
- Bubbling Over (1927 film), an American animated short film
- Bubbling Over (1934 film), an American short subject directed by Leigh Jason
