= The Royal Box (film) =

1929 film

- Directed by: Bryan Foy
- Written by: Arthur Hurley; Edmund Joseph; Murray Roth; Arthur Rundt
- Based on: "The Royal Box" by Charles Coghlan Kean by Alexandre Dumas
- Starring: Alexander Moissi; Camilla Horn; Lew Hearn
- Cinematography: Edwin B. DuPar; Ray Foster
- Music by: Harold Levey
- Production company: Warner Bros.
- Distributed by: National Film (Germany); Warner Bros. (US)
- Release date: November 21, 1929
- Running time: 76 minutes
- Country: United States
- Language: German

The Royal Box (German: Die Königsloge) is a 1929 American historical film directed by Bryan Foy and starring Alexander Moissi, Camilla Horn and Lew Hearn. It is an adaptation of the play Kean by Alexandre Dumas about the life of the British actor Edmund Kean.

It was made by Warner Brothers as a German-language film using the Vitaphone process. In Germany the film was released by the studio's local subsidiary National Film. The film was also released as a silent film in the United States.

== Cast ==
- Alexander Moissi as Edmund Kean
- Camilla Horn as Alice Doren
- Lew Hearn as Salomon
- Elsa Ersi as Countess Toeroek
- William F. Schoeller as H.R.H., The Prince of Wales
- Egon Brecher as Count Toeroek
- Leni Stengel as Lady Robert
- Carlos Zizold as Lord Melvill
- Greta Meyer as Mrs. Barker
- Sig Ruman as Bailiff
- William Gade as Tommy Widgetts

== See also ==
- List of early sound feature films (1926–1929)

== Bibliography ==
- Michael Schaudig. Positionen deutscher Filmgeschichte. Diskurs-Film-Verlag, 1996.
