= Leni Stengel =

German-American actress (1901–1982)

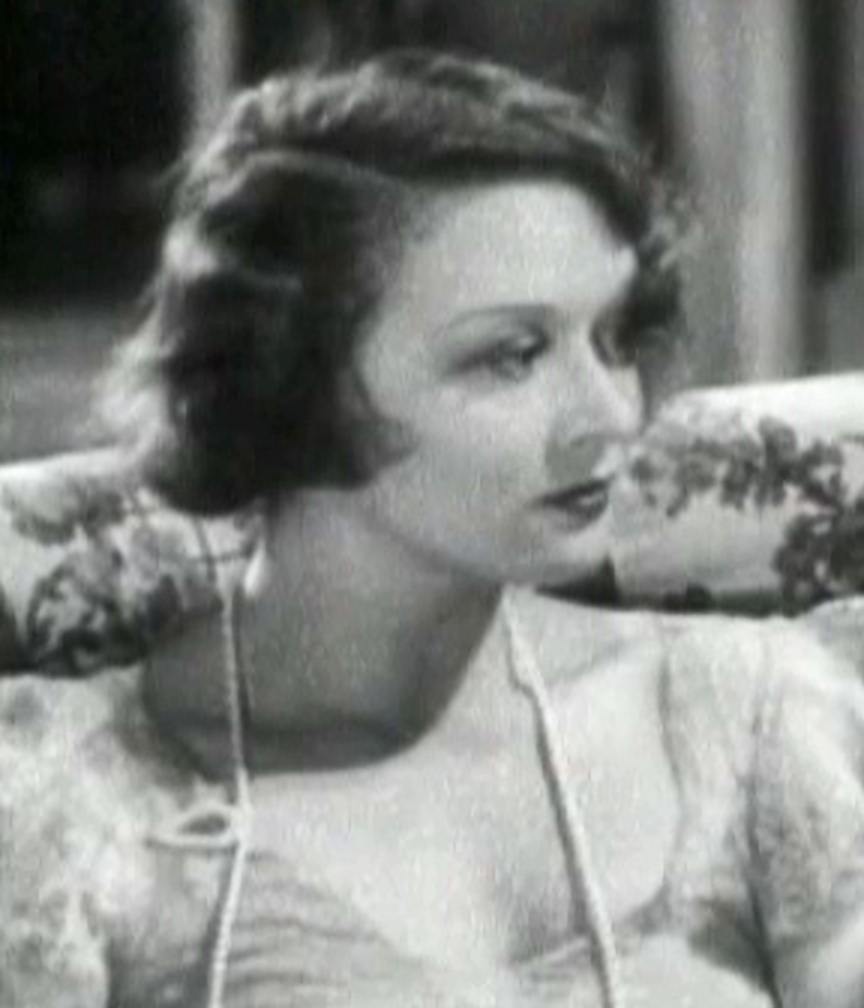
- Stengel in The Animal Kingdom (1932)
- Born: 12 September 1901; Oldenburg, Germany
- Died: 1 July 1982 (aged 80); New York City, U.S.
- Occupation: Actress
- Years active: 1929–1953
- Spouse(s): Robert Archibald Scott (m. 1938; died 1956); Boris Ingster (m. 1930; div. 1937); Hans Stengel (m. 1921; div. 1926)

Leni Stengel, born Magdalene Riechers, (12 September 1901 – 1 July 1982) was a German-born American actress and singer who appeared on stage, television, and in films, from the 1920s through the 1950s. Born in Oldenburg in 1901, she immigrated to the United States in 1906 and later became a naturalized American citizen after her marriage to the film director Boris Ingster in 1930. She had previously been married to the American cartoonist Hans Stengel who committed suicide two years after their divorce in 1926. Her marriage to Ingster also ended in divorce in 1937. She was later married to Robert A. Scott from 1938 until Scott's death in 1956.

Stengel made her stage debut in 1920 under the name Madeline Richers as part of the sextette of chorus girls in the 1920 Broadway musical revival of Florodora. After this she went to Europe where she studied singing and performed in musicals, variety theatre, and in nightclubs. In 1925 she toured in vaudeville in the B. F. Keith Circuit, and then appeared in several Broadway shows in the late 1920s. She also worked as a nightclub singer in New York and Atlantic City. In 1929 she made the transition into film with the role of Lady Roberts in the Warner Bros.'s German-language feature The Royal Box. She was under contract with RKO Radio Pictures from 1930-1933 during which time she also was loaned out by them for several films made with Paramount Pictures among other Hollywood studios. She ended her film career in 1934 making two short films with Shemp Howard for Warner Bros.

After her film career ceased, Stengel continued to perform as a stage actress. She also worked in American television in the early 1950s. She died in New York City in 1982 at the age of 80.

== Early life and education ==
The daughter of Hermann August Riechers and his wife Magdalena Amanda Alma Riechers, Magdalene Henriette Amalia Louise Riechers was born on 12 September 1901 in Oldenburg, Germany. She was a grandniece of the German composer Friedrich von Flotow. She immigrated to the United States in 1906, and was educated in her growing up years in schools in New York City (NYC) and Berlin, Germany. She graduated from Washington Irving High School in NYC. She was an artist in her youth and was a member of the Art Students League of New York. She later studied singing in Milan and Berlin.

== Stage career in the 1920s and first marriage to Hans Stengel ==
In 1920 Leni joined the sextette chorus of the Shubert brothers's Broadway revival of Florodora; acting under an alternate spelling of her maiden name Madeline "Leni" Richers. The Los Angeles Times reported at the time that Richers was a beautiful red-haired girl with ambitions to become an opera singer. She was cast by the Shubert brothers after the artist Floyd Cragg recommended her to them. The production marked her professional debut.

Madeline married Hans Stengel on 5 March 1921 in Manhattan. Stengel was a cartoonist for the New York Herald Tribune and New York Evening Journal. Their marriage ended in divorce in 1926, and Hans Stengel committed suicide two years later while hosting a party. After her marriage she acted under the name Madeline or Leni Stengel. She went to Europe where she made her stage debut at the German theatre in Riga, Russia. She also appeared in ingenue roles in German operettas in Berlin.

By January 1925 she was working in vaudeville in New Jersey and New York in an act billing her act as the "Continental Comedienne". When she achieved headlining status in the B. F. Keith Circuit in Florida in February 1925 it was reported that she had recently returned to the United States from a period spent performing in European music halls. She continued to tour in vaudeville that year to Louisiana, Alabama, Maryland, and Washington D.C.

In June 1925 Stengel starred in a new musical revue, Chatterbox, at the Majestic Theatre in Brooklyn which was produced by Will Morrissey and Jack M. Welch. It had a cast led by Hal Skelly. She then worked as a night club singer in venues in Paris, Berlin, and Atlantic City in 1925-1926, and appeared in musical comedies in Berlin. She was also active as a nightclub singer in New York City. In late 1926 she starred as Adelma in Princess Turandot; an adaptation of Carlo Gozzi's play Turandot at New York's Provincetown Playhouse.

In May 1928 Stengel starred in Patterson McNutt and Edwin Burke's Bed and Bored at the Cort Theatre in Jamaica, New York and the Windsor Theatre in the Bronx. In September 1928 she portrayed the role of Carlotta Barbe in Edward and Edith Ellis's play Women at the Adelphi Theatre in Philadelphia. She ended the year acting at Broadway's Booth Theatre as Olga Bukarov in Leonard Ide's play These Few Ashes. In January 1929 she starred in a new musical, Cheer Up, at the Boulevard Theatre with a cast led by Don Barclay. Later that year she performed with Sterling Holloway in the Shoestring Revue at the Lyric Theatre in Hoboken, New Jersey.

== Film career and second marriage to Boris Ingster ==
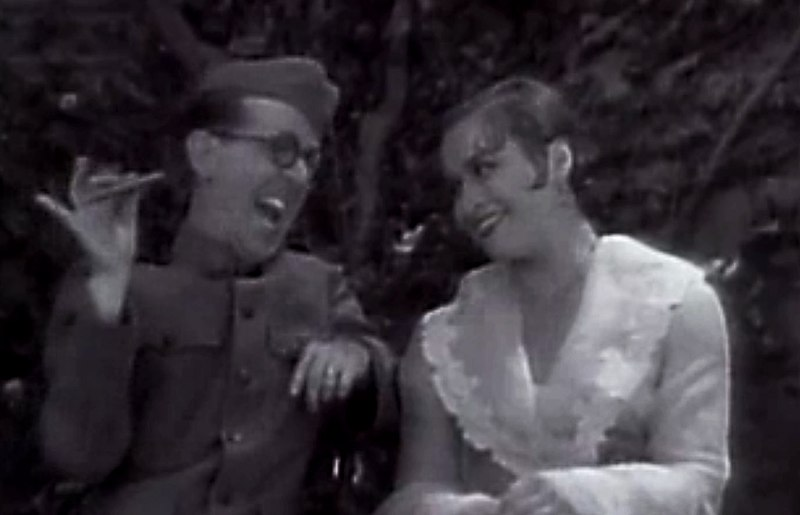
Robert Woolsey and Leni Stengel in Half Shot at Sunrise (1930)

Leni Stengel with Bobby Clark and Paul McCullough in Kickin' the Crown Around (1933)

Leni Stengel, with Don Dillaway and Ann Harding in The Animal Kingdom (1932)

Stengler transitioned into work as a film actress in California; beginning with the part of Lady Robert in Warner Bros.'s German-language feature The Royal Box (1929) which was adapted from the play Kean by Alexandre Dumas. For Warner Bros. she also appeared in the Vitaphone Varieties short film The Master Sweeper (1930). Later that year she signed a three year contract with RKO Radio Pictures. She married film director Boris Ingster in Los Angeles on Christmas Eve 1930; obtaining a marriage license three days later on 27 December 1930. Following her wedding she became a naturalized American citizen. Their marriage ended in divorce in 1937.

Stengler's first role in a full-length English-language film was Olga in RKO's Half Shot at Sunrise; a film starring the comedy duo Wheeler & Woolsey. She appeared in another Wheeler & Woolsey film for RKO, Cracked Nuts (1931), in which she played the part of Queen Carlotta. In these works, as well as in radio performances with Wheeler & Woolsey, she acted as the straight man and romantic interest with Robert Woolsey, as Dorothy Lee did with Bert Wheeler. In Half Shot at Sunrise, Stengler and Woolsey share a comic dance routine, during which she tears off most of Woolsey's doughboy uniform, until he ends up in his skivvies, posing in a fountain.

Other RKO Pictures she had roles in included Beau Ideal (1931, as Zuleika), and The Animal Kingdom (1932, as the cellist Franc Schmidt). While working for RKO she also appeared in films for Paramount Pictures; including The Road to Reno (1931, as Mrs. Stafford Howes), The Beloved Bachelor (1931, as Julie Stressman), Husband's Holiday (1930, as Molly Saunders), Luxury Liner (1933, a slattern) and Kickin' the Crown Around (1933, The Queen). She worked with Buster Keaton in Casanova wider Willen ("The Reluctant Casanova", 1931), the German version of Parlor, Bedroom and Bath (1931).

In 1933 Stengler left RKO. For the Fox Film Corporation she portrayed Countess Vonesse in Man About Town (1932), and Columbia Pictures she appeared as Mrs. Landau in Hollywood Speaks (1932). For Metro-Goldwyn-Mayer she appeared in an unnamed part in Just a Gigolo (1931) and as the German tourist Ilsa in The Barbarian (1933). In 1934 she performed opposite Shemp Howard in two short film made by Warner Bros.: Henry the Ache and Art Trouble.

== Later life and career ==
After her film career halted, Stengel spent time living with her parents in Berlin in the mid 1930s. In 1936 she returned to Broadway as Madame Van Hemert in Jacques Deval's Tovarich (1936), and later made one final Broadway appearance as Sister Agatha in Charles MacArthur and Ben Hecht's Swan Song (1946).

In television, she appeared as a guest in the series The Clock in the episode "Accident on Canigou" (1951), and portrayed a romantic rival to actress Anne Bancroft's character in the Studio One episode "Wintertime". This was followed by guest appearances in Lights Out (1951, episode "Dark Image" as Carmelita) and Police Story (1952, episode "The Nashville, Tennessee Story"). She also appeared in the anthology series Lux Video Theatre in the episodes "Legacy of Love" (1952) and "Ti Babette" (1953).

Stengel married Robert Archibald Scott in Manhattan on 19 March 1938. He died in 1956. She died in July 1982 in New York City, New York, USA.

Leni Stengel as Zuleika, in Beau Ideal (1931)
