= Guerrilla warfare =

Warfare by small groups against regular forces

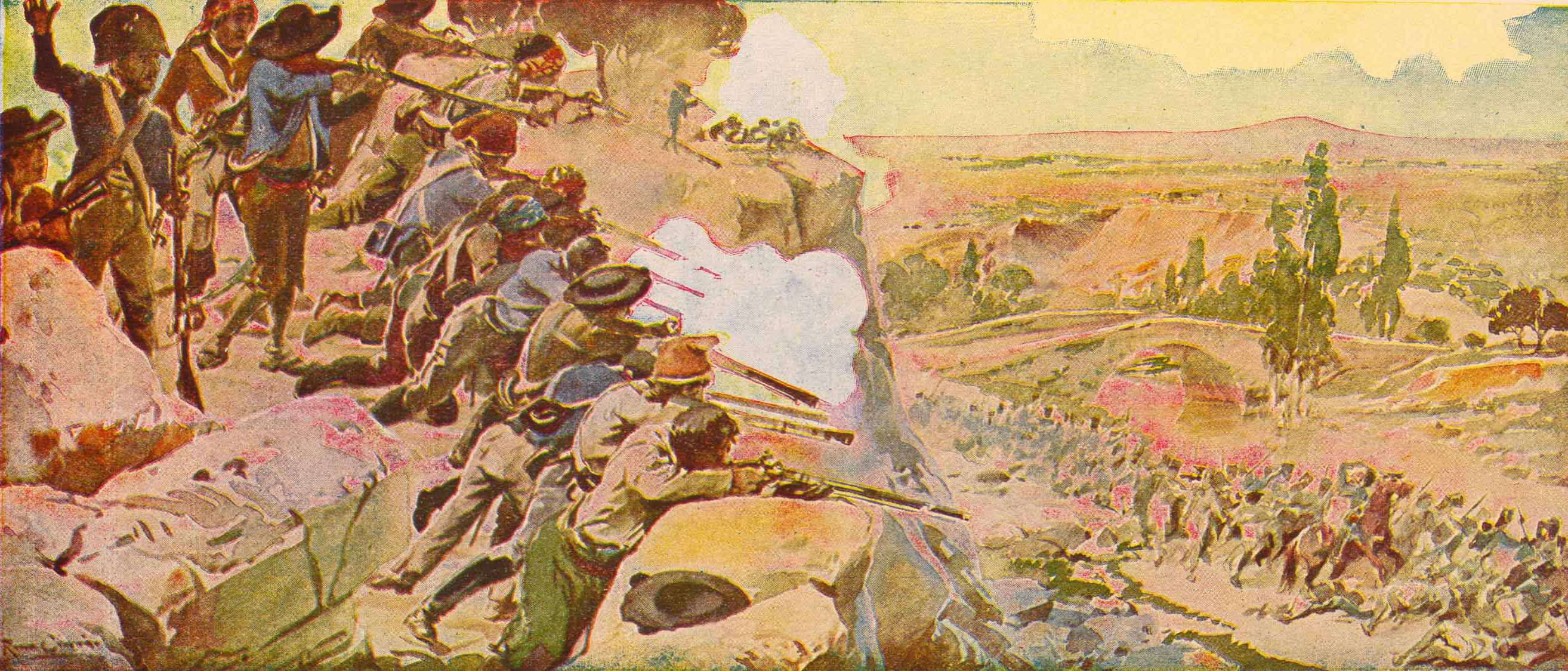
Guerrilla warfare during the Peninsular War, by Roque Gameiro, depicting a Portuguese guerrilla ambush against French forces

Guerrilla warfare is a type of unconventional warfare in which small groups of irregular military, such as rebels, partisans, paramilitary personnel or armed civilians use ambushes, sabotage, terrorism, raids, petty warfare or hit-and-run tactics in a rebellion, in a violent conflict, in a war or in a civil war to fight against regular military, police or rival insurgent forces.

Although the term "guerrilla warfare" was coined in the context of the Peninsular War in the 19th century, the tactical methods of guerrilla warfare have long been in use. In the 6th century BC, Sun Tzu proposed the use of guerrilla-style tactics in The Art of War. The 3rd century BC Roman general Quintus Fabius Maximus Verrucosus is also credited with inventing many of the tactics of guerrilla warfare through what is today called the Fabian strategy, and in China Peng Yue is also often regarded as the inventor of guerrilla warfare. Guerrilla warfare has been used by various factions throughout history and is particularly associated with revolutionary movements and popular resistance against invading or occupying armies.

Guerrilla tactics focus on avoiding head-on confrontations with enemy armies, typically due to inferior arms or forces, and instead engage in limited skirmishes with the goal of exhausting adversaries and forcing them to withdraw (see also attrition warfare). Organized guerrilla groups often depend on the support of either the local population or foreign backers who sympathize with the guerrilla group's efforts.

== Etymology ==
The Spanish word guerrilla is the diminutive form of guerra ("war"); hence, "little war". The term became popular during the early-19th-century Peninsular War, when, after the defeat of their regular armies, the Spanish and Portuguese people successfully rose against the Napoleonic troops and defeated a highly superior army using the guerrilla strategy in combination with a scorched earth policy and people's war (see also attrition warfare against Napoleon). In correct Spanish usage, a person who is a member of a guerrilla unit is a guerrillero ([geriˈʎeɾo]) if male, or a guerrillera ([geriˈʎeɾa]) if female. Arthur Wellesley adopted the term "guerrilla" into English from Spanish usage in 1809, to refer to the individual fighters (e.g., "I have recommended to set the Guerrillas to work"), and also (as in Spanish) to denote a group or band of such fighters. However, in most languages guerrilla still denotes a specific style of warfare. The use of the diminutive evokes the differences in number, scale, and scope between the guerrilla army and the formal, professional army of the state.

== History ==
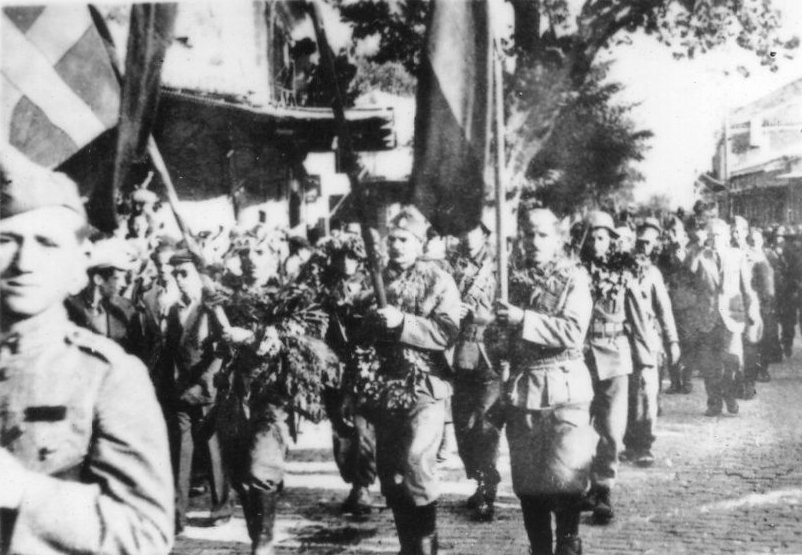
Guerrillas of the Greek People's Liberation Army in Xanthi during World War II

Prehistoric tribal warriors presumably employed guerrilla-style tactics against enemy tribes:

Primitive (and guerrilla) warfare consists of war stripped to its essentials: the murder of enemies; the theft or destruction of their sustenance, wealth, and essential resources; and the inducement in them of insecurity and terror. It conducts the basic business of war without recourse to ponderous formations or equipment, complicated maneuvers, strict chains of command, calculated strategies, timetables, or other civilized embellishments.

Evidence of conventional warfare, on the other hand, did not emerge until 3100 BC in Egypt and Mesopotamia. The Chinese general and strategist Sun Tzu, in his The Art of War (6th century BC), became one of the earliest to propose the use of guerrilla warfare. This inspired developments in modern guerrilla warfare.

Classical Greeks looked down on guerillas, perceiving that constant, low-level conflict was ruinous for both sides. They preferred to settle disputes in decisive, open battles.

In the 3rd century BC, Quintus Fabius Maximus Verrucosus, called Cunctator ("delayer"), used elements of guerrilla warfare, such as the evasion of battle, the attempt to wear down the enemy, to attack small detachments in an ambush and devised the Fabian strategy, which the Roman Republic used to great effect against Hannibal's army, see also His Excellency : George Washington: the Fabian choice. The Roman general Quintus Sertorius is also noted for his skillful use of guerrilla warfare during his revolt against the Roman Senate. In China, Han dynasty general Peng Yue is often regarded as the inventor of guerrilla warfare due to his use of irregular warfare in the Chu-Han contention to attack Chu convoys and supplies.

In the Byzantine Empire, guerrilla warfare was frequently practiced between the eighth through tenth centuries along the eastern frontier with the Umayyad and then Abbasid caliphates. Tactics involved a heavy emphasis on reconnaissance and intelligence, shadowing the enemy, evacuating threatened population centers, and attacking when the enemy dispersed to raid. In the later tenth century this form of warfare was codified in a military manual known by its later Latin name as De velitatione bellica ('On Skirmishing') so it would not be forgotten in the future.

The Normans often made many forays into Wales, where the Welsh used the mountainous region, which the Normans were unfamiliar with, to spring surprise attacks upon them.

Gonzalo Fernández de Córdoba successfully employed guerrilla warfare during the Italian Wars, where his Italian lieutenant and successor Prospero Colonna was called Cuntatore after Quintus Fabius Maximus due to their similar tactics. Guerrilla warfare eventually became one of the specialties of the Spanish tercios, including techniques like the camisado.

Since the Enlightenment, ideologies such as nationalism, liberalism, socialism, and religious fundamentalism have played an important role in shaping insurgencies and guerrilla warfare.

In the 17th century, Chatrapati Shivaji Maharaj, founder of the Maratha Kingdom, pioneered the Shiva sutra or Ganimi Kava (Guerrilla Tactics) to defeat the many times larger and more powerful armies of the Mughal Empire.

During the Dominican Restoration War between 1863 and 1865, Spanish soldiers were deprived of supplies and weapons as insurgents intercepted mule supply trains, captured arms depots containing rifles, cannons, and ammunition, and burned towns they could not hold to deny the Spanish access to supplies and shelter.

Irregular warfare emerged as a critical, though often uncontrollable, strategy for the Confederacy, reflecting both local resistance and the South’s desperate hopes to delay defeat. One successful Guerrilla warfare was the Red River Campaign acted as a force multiplier for the Confederates, exploiting terrain and the fragmented Union command structure. The cumulative effects of small-scale skirmishes, disruptions to supply lines, ambushes, and harassment of Union river flotillas exacerbated the shortcomings of Union strategic planning. This combination of conventional and irregular tactics was instrumental in enabling Confederate forces under Taylor to achieve decisive victories in the Trans-Mississippi Theater, extend the Union retreat, and ultimately ensure a successful outcome for the Confederacy in the campaign.

Paraguay, during the War of the Triple Alliance, resorted to guerrilla warfare. The country lost the majority of the adult male population.

Francs-tireurs continued the Franco-Prussian War after it was lost, leading to reprisals.

The Riffian Berber military leader Abd el-Krim (c. 1883 – 1963) and his father unified the Berber tribes under their control and took up arms against the Spanish and French occupiers during the Rif War in 1920. For the first time in history, tunnel warfare was used alongside modern guerrilla tactics, which caused considerable damage to both the colonial armies in Morocco.

In the early 20th century Michael Collins and Tom Barry both developed many tactical features of guerrilla warfare during the guerrilla phase of the 1919–1921 Irish War of Independence. Collins developed mainly urban guerrilla warfare tactics in Dublin City (the Irish capital). Operations in which small Irish Republican Army (IRA) units (3 to 6 guerrillas) quickly attacked a target and then disappeared into civilian crowds. In County Cork, Tom Barry was the commander of the IRA West Cork brigade. Fighting in west Cork was rural, and the IRA fought in much larger units than their comrades in urban areas. These units, called "flying columns", engaged British forces in large battles, usually for between 10–30 minutes.

The Algerian Revolution of 1954 started with a handful of Algerian guerrillas. Primitively armed, the guerrillas fought the French for over eight years. This remains a prototype for modern insurgency and counterinsurgency, terrorism, torture, and asymmetric warfare prevalent throughout the world today. In South Africa, African National Congress (ANC) members studied the Algerian War, prior to the release and apotheosis of Nelson Mandela; in their intifada against Israel, Palestinian fighters have sought to emulate it. Additionally, the tactics of Al-Qaeda closely resemble those of the Algerians.

== Theoretical works ==
The growth of guerrilla warfare was inspired in part by theoretical works on guerrilla warfare, starting with the Guerrilla Warfare Manuel (1864) by Matías Ramón Mella written in the 19th century:

...our troops should...fight while protected by the terrain...using small, mobile guerrilla units to exhaust the enemy...denying them rest so that they only control the terrain under their feet.

Mao Zedong's On Guerrilla Warfare, Che Guevara's Guerrilla Warfare, and Lenin's Guerrilla warfare were all written after the successful revolutions carried out by them in China, Cuba and Russia, respectively. Those texts characterized the tactic of guerrilla warfare as, according to Che Guevara's text, being "used by the side which is supported by a majority but which possesses a much smaller number of arms for use in defense against oppression".

=== Writings of T. E. Lawrence ===
T. E. Lawrence, best known as "Lawrence of Arabia", wrote down some of his theories while ill and unable to fight the Turks in his book Seven Pillars of Wisdom. There, he reviews von Clausewitz and other theorists of war, and finds their writings inapplicable to his situation. The Arabs could not defeat the Turks in pitched battle since they were individualistic warriors not disciplined soldiers used to fight in large formations.

=== Maoist thought ===
Simplified guerrilla warfare organization

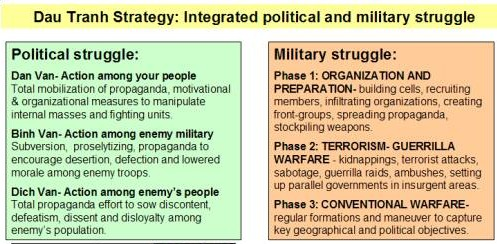
The classic "3-phase" Maoist model as adapted by North Vietnam's Ho Chi Minh and Võ Nguyên Giáp.

Mao Zedong argued that guerrilla insurgency, or what he referred to as a "war of revolutionary nature," can be conceived of as part of a continuum. On the low end are small-scale raids, ambushes and attacks. The upper end is composed of a fully integrated political-military strategy, comprising both large and small units, engaging in constantly shifting mobile warfare, both on the low-end "guerrilla" scale, and that of large, mobile formations with modern arms.

The Maoist Theory of People's War divides warfare into three phases. In Phase One, the guerrillas earn the population's support by distributing propaganda and attacking the organs of government. In Phase Two, escalating attacks are launched against the government's military forces and vital institutions. In Phase Three, conventional warfare and fighting are used to seize cities, overthrow the government, and assume control of the country. Mao Zedong's seminal work, On Guerrilla Warfare, has been widely distributed and applied most successfully in Vietnam, by military leader and theorist Võ Nguyên Giáp, whose "Peoples War, Peoples Army" closely follows the Maoist three-phase approach. Some authors have stressed this interchangeability of phases inherent in this model and guerrilla warfare more generally, especially as applied by the Vietcong guerrilla.

=== Foco theory ===
In the 1960s, the Marxist revolutionary Che Guevara developed the foco (Spanish: foquismo) theory of revolution in his book Guerrilla Warfare, based on his experiences during the 1959 Cuban Revolution. This theory was later formalized as "focal-ism" by Régis Debray. Its central principle is that vanguardism by cadres of small, fast-moving paramilitary groups can provide a focus for popular discontent against a sitting regime, and thereby lead a general insurrection. Although the original approach was to mobilize and launch attacks from rural areas, many foco ideas were adapted into urban guerrilla warfare movements.

=== Nasution's Fundamentals of Guerrilla Warfare ===
The fullest expression of the Indonesian army's founding doctrines is found in Abdul Haris Nasution's 1953 Fundamentals of Guerrilla Warfare. The work is a mix of reproduced strategic directives from 1947 to 1948, Nasution's theories of guerrilla warfare, his reflections on the post-Japanese occupation period, and the likely crises to come. The work contains similar principles to those espoused or practiced by other theorists and practitioners from Michael Collins in Ireland, T. E. Lawrence in the Middle East and Mao in China in the early Twentieth Century. Nasution willingly shows his influences, frequently referring to some guerrilla activities as "Wingate" actions. The work substantially differs from other theorist/practitioners in that General Nasution was one of the few men to have led both a guerrilla and a counter-guerrilla war. This dual perspective on the realities of "people's war" leaves the work refreshingly free of the perceived hyperbole and ideological leanings of similar revolutionary works from the period.

== Strategy and tactics ==
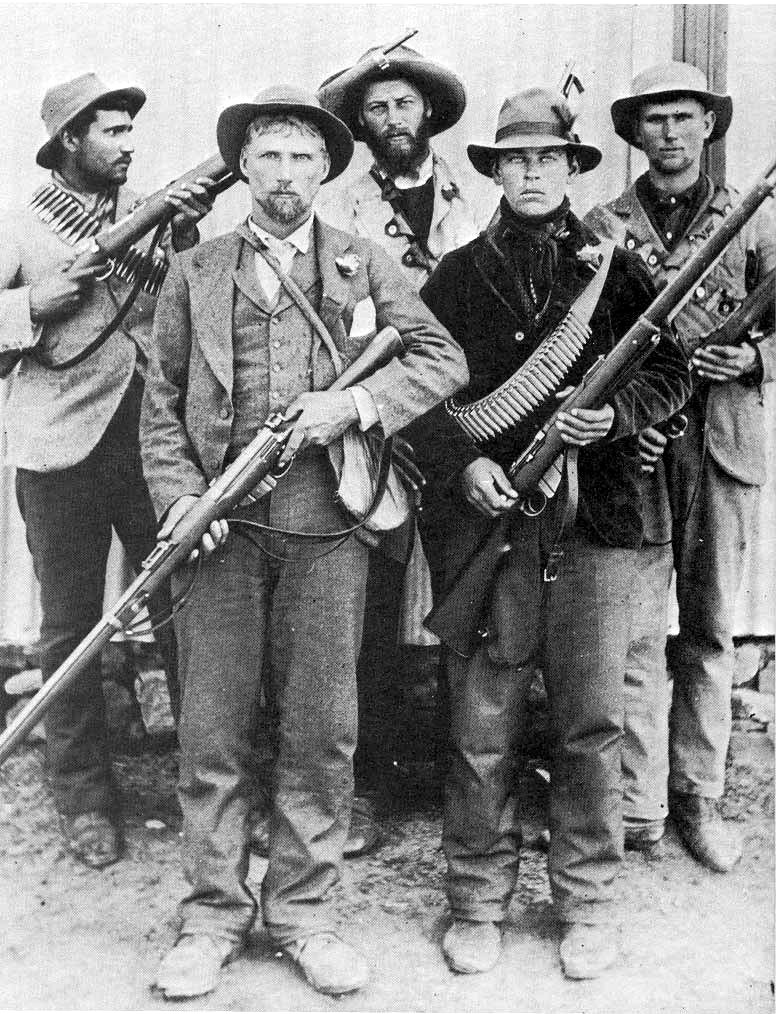
Boer guerrillas during the Second Boer War in South Africa

=== Strategic models of guerrilla warfare ===
Modern insurgencies and other types of warfare may include guerrilla warfare as part of an integrated process, complete with sophisticated doctrine, organization, specialist skills and propaganda capabilities. Guerrillas can operate as small, scattered bands of raiders, but they can also work side by side with regular forces, or combine for far ranging mobile operations in squad, platoon or battalion sizes, or even form conventional units. Based on their level of sophistication and organization, they can shift between all these modes as the situation demands. Successful guerrilla warfare is flexible, not static.

==== Contemporary patterns ====
Some contemporary guerrilla warfare does not follow the Maoist template at all, and might encompass vicious ethnic strife, religious fervor, and numerous small, 'freelance' groups operating independently with little overarching structure. These patterns do not easily fit into phase-driven categories or three-echelon structures as in the People's Wars of Asia.

Some jihadist attacks may be driven by a generalized desire to restore a reputed golden age of earlier times. Ethnic attacks likewise may materialize as bombings, assassinations, or genocidal raids as a matter of avenging perceived slights or insults, rather than a final eventual shift to conventional warfare. Environmental conditions, such as increasing urbanization and easy access to information and media also complicate the contemporary scene, and can include vast networks of peoples bound by religion and ethnicity stretched across the globe.

=== Tactics ===
Guerrilla tactics are on intelligence, ambush, deception, sabotage, and espionage, undermining an authority through long, low-intensity confrontation. A guerrilla army may increase the cost of maintaining an occupation or a colonial presence above what the foreign power may wish to bear. Against a local regime, the guerrilla fighters may make governance impossible with terror strikes and sabotage. These tactics are useful in demoralizing an enemy, while raising the morale of the guerrillas.

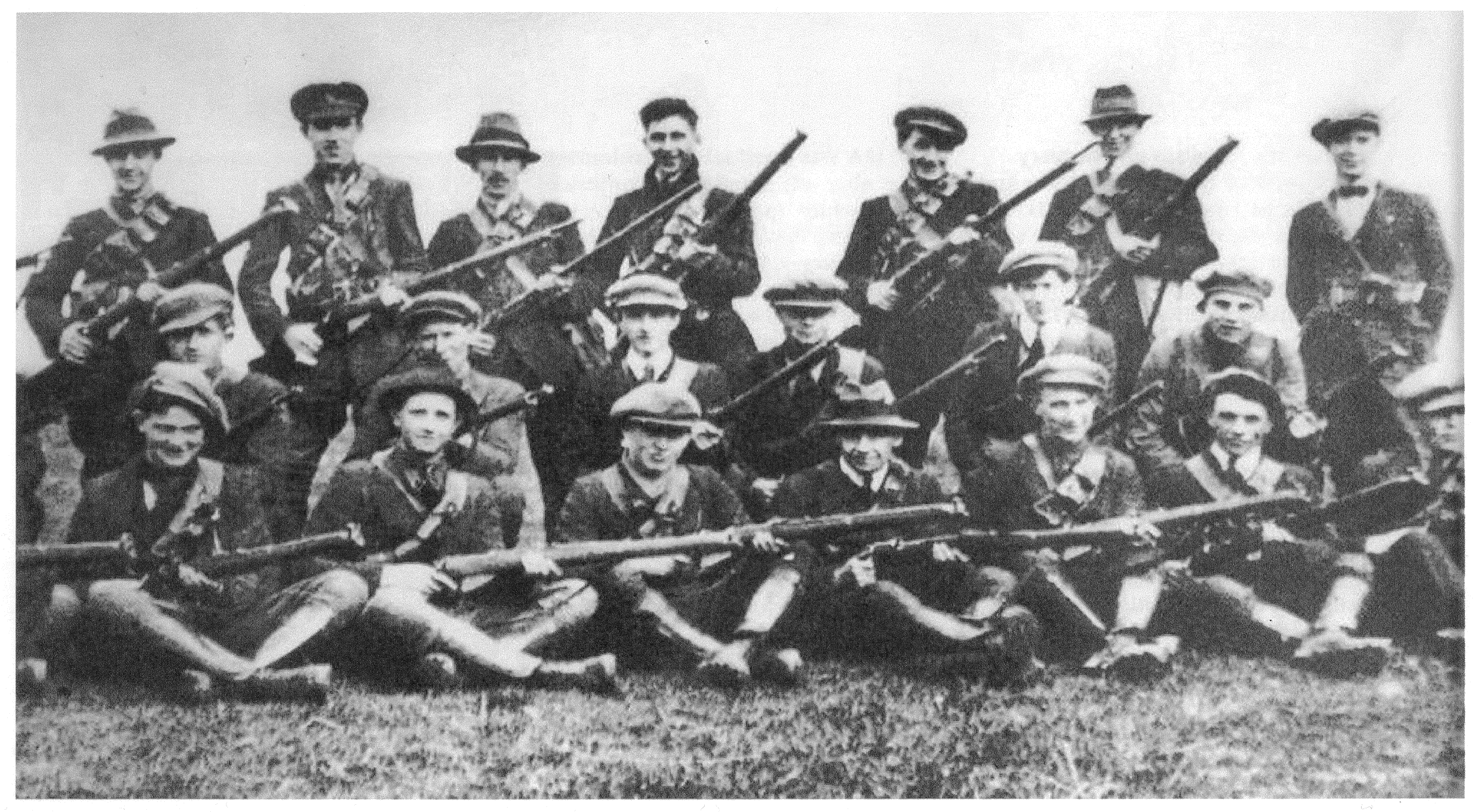
Seán Hogan's flying column of the IRA's 3rd Tipperary Brigade, during the Irish War of Independence

Guerrilla operations typically include a variety of strong surprise attacks on transportation routes, individual groups of police or military, installations and structures, economic enterprises, and targeted civilians. Attacking in small groups, using camouflage and often captured weapons of the enemy, the guerrilla force can constantly keep pressure on its foes and diminish its numbers, while still allowing escape with relatively few casualties. The intention of such attacks is political, aiming to demoralize target populations or governments, or goading an overreaction that forces the population to take sides. Examples range from the chopping off of limbs in various internal African rebellions, to the suicide attacks in Israel and Sri Lanka, to sophisticated manoeuvres by Viet Cong and NVA forces against military bases and formations.

Main Force 274 Regiment versus 11th Armored cav, 1966, Vietnam

==== Ambushes ====
Ambushes have been used for as long as guerrilla warfare has been a tactic, and many guerrilla and insurgent groups have used ambushes as a way of defeating superior enemy forces with minimal risk to the insurgents. The ability of an insurgent force to launch an attack against unsuspecting enemy forces and then withdraw in order to avoid engaging superior enemy reinforcements makes ambushes a very useful tactic for guerrilla and insurgent forces.

==== Assassinations ====
Insurgent groups have often employed assassination as a tool to further their causes. Assassinations provide several functions for such groups, namely the removal of specific enemies and as propaganda tools to focus the attention of media and politics on their cause. Assassinations were notably used as a tactic of guerilla warfare during the Irish War of Independence, the Troubles, the Basque conflict, the Italian Years of Lead, the Vietnam War, and the Israeli-Palestinian conflict.

Simplified view of the Viet Cong organization. Functions such as security or propaganda were duplicated at each level.

=== Organization ===
Guerrilla warfare resembles rebellion, yet it is a different concept. Guerrilla organization ranges from local rebel groups of a few dozen guerrillas to thousands of fighters, deploying from cells to regiments. Typically, the organization has political and military wings, to allow the political leaders "plausible denial" for military attacks. The most fully elaborated guerrilla warfare structure is by the Chinese and Vietnamese communists during the revolutionary wars of East and Southeast Asia.

==== Law and order ====
Insurgents may attempt to create a parallel system of "justice" with punishment, beatings, and killings of criminals in order to integrate themselves with the populace. Especially in corrupt regimes where there is a deficit of true justice, people's and revolutionary courts aim to legitimize the insurgents as a government in waiting. This is doubly so if insurgents are seen as bringing order in failed regimes, regime weak in control, and situations in which the security forces are widely feared. An example of guerrilla law-and-order is found in the Myanmar Civil War, where groups such as the National Unity Government and Karen National Union established their own systems of education, law enforcement, and civil service.

==== Propaganda ====
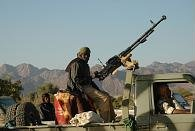
A Tuareg rebel fighter with a DShK on a technical in northern Niger, 2008

Propaganda is used to sell to the populace the legitimacy, morality and ability of the insurgents, while simultaneously portraying the government and its security forces in a negative light. This propaganda can be of the deed, spectacular acts of assassination, sabotage and violence, relying on the mass media to spread the insurgents message. Older means of disseminating messaging include pamphletting (e.g. Thomas Paine's Common Sense) and through use of the oral tradition of stories, rebel and revolutionary songs. Modern insurgents often use the internet.

==== Recruitment of sympathizers within the state ====
Insurgent organizations may recruit members of the government's civil and security forces to their cause or to have their own members join them. In addition to providing intelligence and possibly providing aid, doing so allows insurgent members to gain military training and skills which they would not otherwise be able to access. These members may then serve as a cadre to train other insurgents; those who rise high enough may become agents of influence.

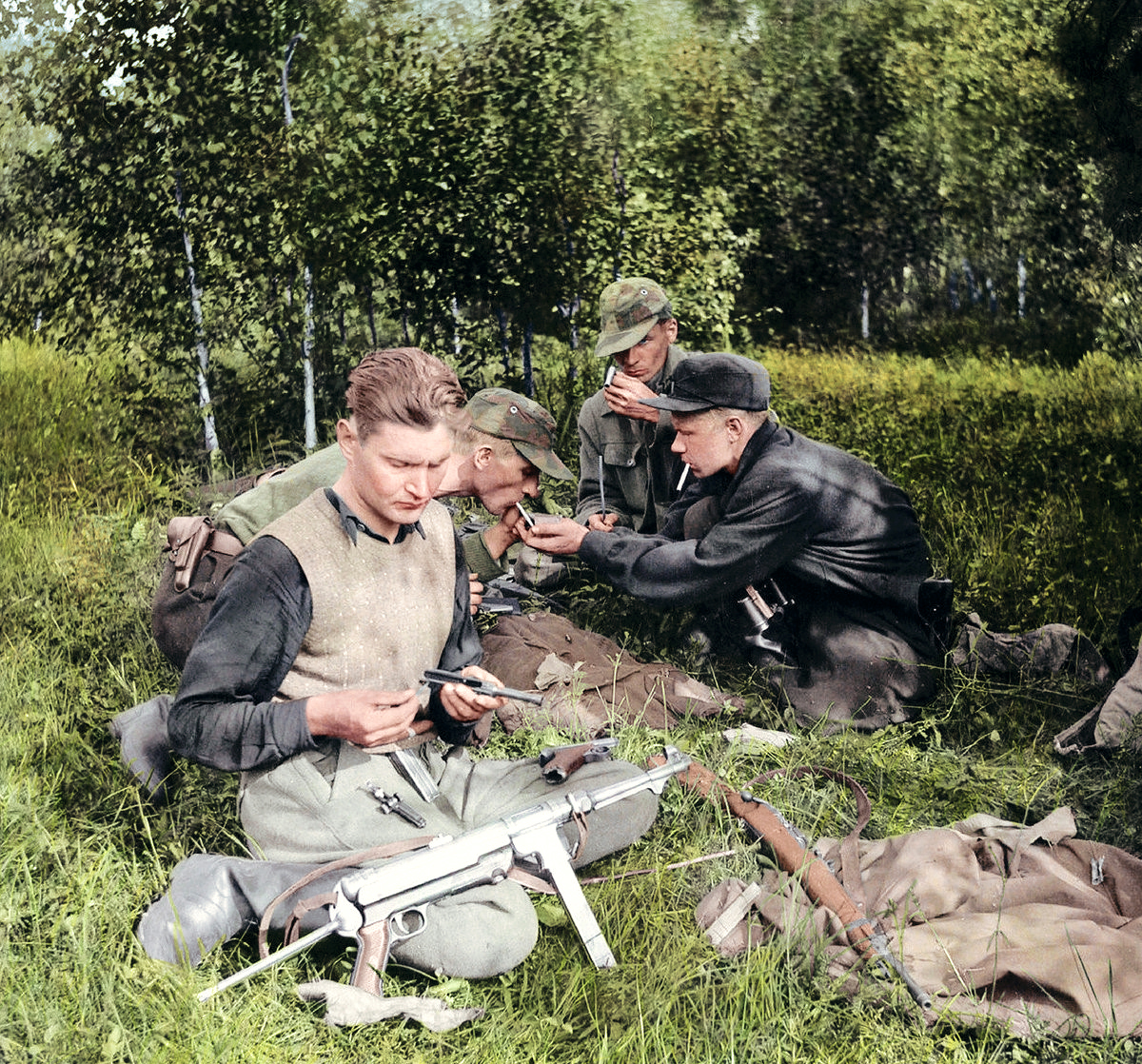
Estonian Forest Brothers relaxing and cleaning their guns after a shooting exercise in Veskiaru, Järva County, Estonian SSR, in 1953

==== Intelligence ====
For successful operations, surprise must be achieved by the guerrillas. If the operation has been betrayed or compromised, it is usually called off immediately. Intelligence is also extremely important, and detailed knowledge of the target's dispositions, weaponry and morale is gathered before any attack.

Intelligence can be harvested in several ways. Collaborators and sympathizers will usually provide a steady flow of useful information. Employment or enrollment as a student may be undertaken near the target zone, community organizations may be infiltrated, and even romantic relationships struck up as part of intelligence gathering. Public sources of information are also invaluable to the guerrilla; modern computer access via the World Wide Web makes harvesting and collation of such data relatively easy. The use of on-the-spot reconnaissance is integral to operational planning.

==== Relationships with civilian populations ====
Relationships with civilian populations are influenced by whether the guerrillas operate among a hostile or friendly population. A friendly population is of immense importance to guerrilla fighters, providing shelter, supplies, financing, intelligence and recruits, being the key lifeline of any guerrilla movement. Popular mass support in a confined local area or country, however, is not always strictly necessary. Guerrillas and revolutionary groups can still operate using the protection of a friendly regime, drawing supplies, weapons, intelligence, local security and diplomatic cover.

An apathetic or hostile population makes life difficult for guerrilla fighters, and strenuous attempts are usually made to gain their support. These may involve both persuasion and calculated policy of intimidation. Guerrilla forces may characterize a variety of operations as a liberation struggle, but this may or may not result in sufficient support from affected civilians. Other factors, including ethnic and religious hatreds, can make a simple national liberation claim untenable. Whatever the exact mix of persuasion or coercion used by guerrillas, relationships with civil populations are one of the most important factors in their success or failure.

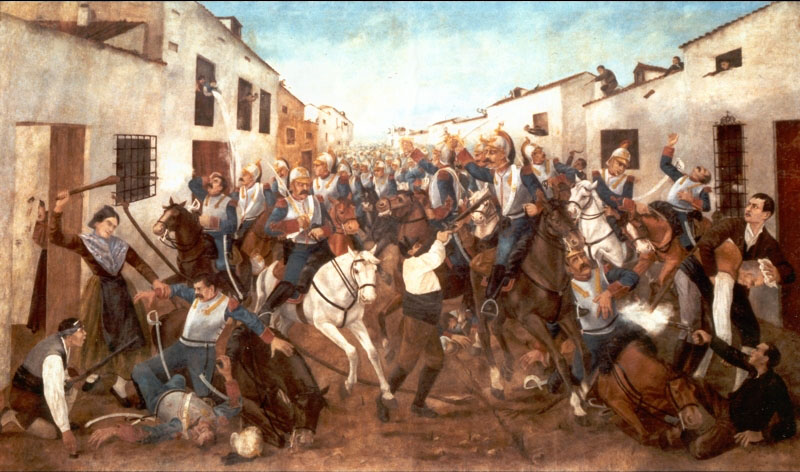
Spanish guerrilla resistance to the Napoleonic French invasion of Spain at the Battle of Valdepeñas

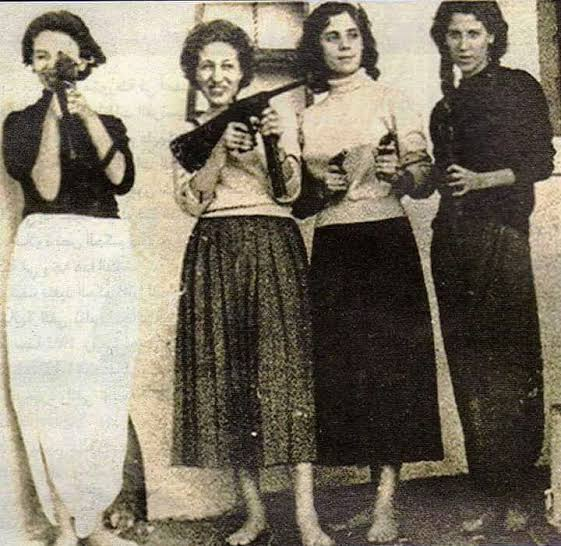
Lakhdari, Drif, Bouhired and Bouali. Female Algerian guerrillas of the Algerian War of Independence, c. 1956.

==== Sabotage ====
Sabotage against infrastructure, such as power stations, airports and reservoirs at the upper end, and for example electricity pylons, substations, telephone exchanges and railway tracks at the lower end make real to the populace that an insurgency is underway; and if sustained can affect the quality of life of the populace. Sabotage was notably used by a variety of forces during the Second World War, the Malayan Emergency, the Vietnam War, the Soviet-Afghan War, and the Nicaraguan Revolution and reactive Contras Insurgency.

=== Comparison of guerrilla warfare and terrorism ===
No commonly accepted definition of "terrorism" has attained clear consensus. The term "terrorism" is often used as political propaganda by belligerents (most often by governments in power) to denounce opponents whose status as terrorists is disputed.

While the primary concern of guerrillas is the enemy's active military units, actual terrorists largely are concerned with non-military agents and target mostly civilians.

=== Withdrawal ===
Guerrillas must plan carefully for withdrawal once an operation has been completed, or if it is going badly. The withdrawal phase is sometimes regarded as the most important part of a planned action, and to get entangled in a lengthy struggle with superior forces is usually fatal to insurgent, terrorist or revolutionary operatives. Withdrawal is usually accomplished using a variety of different routes and methods and may include quickly scouring the area for loose weapons, evidence cleanup, and disguise as peaceful civilians.

== Additional factors ==
=== Foreign support and sanctuaries ===
Foreign support in the form of soldiers, weapons, sanctuary, or statements of sympathy for the guerrillas is not strictly necessary, but it can greatly increase the chances of an insurgent victory. Foreign diplomatic support may bring the guerrilla cause to international attention, putting pressure on local opponents to make concessions, or garnering sympathetic support and material assistance. Foreign sanctuaries can add heavily to guerrilla chances, furnishing weapons, supplies, materials and training bases. Such shelter can benefit from international law, particularly if the sponsoring government is successful in concealing its support and in claiming "plausible denial" for attacks by operatives based in its territory.

=== Law of war ===
Guerrilleros are in danger of not being recognized as lawful combatants because they may not wear a uniform, (to mingle with the local population), or their uniform and distinctive emblems may not be recognized as such by their opponents.

Article 44, sections 3 and 4 of the 1977 First Additional Protocol to the Geneva Conventions, "relating to the Protection of Victims of International Armed Conflicts", does recognize combatants who, because of the nature of the conflict, do not wear uniforms as long as they carry their weapons openly during military operations. This gives non-uniformed guerrilleros lawful combatant status against countries that have ratified this convention. However, the same protocol states in Article 37.1.c that "the feigning of civilian, non-combatant status" shall constitute perfidy and is prohibited by the Geneva Conventions. So is the wearing of enemy uniform, as happened in the Boer War.

=== Terrain ===
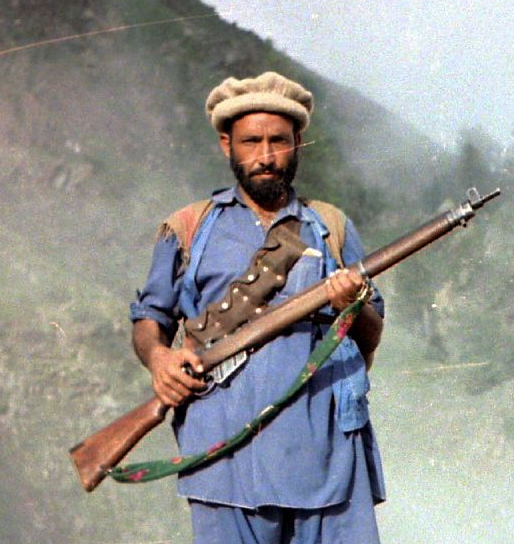
Afghan Mujahideen

Guerrilla warfare is often associated with a rural setting, as was the case for the Chinese Red Army, the mujahadeen of Afghanistan, the Ejército Guerrillero de los Pobres (EGP) of Guatemala, the Contras of Nicaragua, and the FMLN of El Salvador. However, guerrillas have successfully operated in urban settings, like in Argentina and Northern Ireland, relying on a friendly population to provide supplies and intelligence. Rural guerrillas prefer to operate in regions providing plenty of cover and concealment, especially heavily forested and mountainous areas. Urban guerrillas, rather than melting into the mountains and forests, blend into the population and are also dependent on a support base among the people.

== Counter-guerrilla warfare ==
The guerrilla can be difficult to beat, but certain principles of counter-insurgency warfare are well known since the 1950s and 1960s and have been successfully applied. The widely distributed and influential work of Sir Robert Thompson, counter-insurgency expert of the Malayan Emergency, offers several such guidelines. Thompson's underlying assumption is that of a country minimally committed to the rule of law and better governance. Some governments, however, give such considerations short shrift, and their counter-insurgency operations have involved mass murder, genocide, starvation and the massive spread of terror, torture and execution.

Some writers on counter-insurgency warfare emphasize the more turbulent nature of today's guerrilla warfare environment, where the clear political goals, parties and structures of such places as Vietnam, Malaysia, or El Salvador are not as prevalent. These writers point to numerous guerrilla conflicts that center around religious, ethnic or even criminal enterprise themes, and that do not lend themselves to the classic "national liberation" template.

The wide availability of the Internet has also cause changes in the tempo and mode of guerrilla operations in such areas as coordination of strikes, leveraging of financing, recruitment, and media manipulation. While the classic guidelines still apply, today's anti-guerrilla forces need to accept a more disruptive, disorderly and ambiguous mode of operation.

== See also ==
- Armed Insurrection
- Free war
- Freedom Fighters (disambiguation)
- Fuerzas sutiles
- Yank Levy
- List of guerrilla movements
- List of guerrillas
- List of revolutions and rebellions
- Militia
- New generation warfare
- Partisan (military)
- Resistance during World War II
- Special forces
- Civilian Irregular Defense Group program
- United Nations Partisan Infantry Korea
- Violent non-state actor
- National Liberation Front of South Vietnam
- TM 31-210 Improvised Munitions Handbook
