= Boris Ingster =

American film director (1903–1978)

Boris Ingster was a Russian and American screenwriter, film and television director, and producer (October 29, 1903, in Riga, then in the Russian Empire – August 2, 1978, in Los Angeles, California) notable for his role in launching the film noir genre. In the 1930s he was a screenwriter on several films. He made his directorial debut in 1940 with the film noir movie Stranger on the Third Floor. In the 1950s and 1960s he shifted much of his attention to producing television series in genres ranging from drama to Westerns and spy thrillers.

== Early life and family ==
Boris Ingster is a literal Yiddish translation for Boris Jr. His real name and family name was Boris Mikhailovich Azarkh (Russian: Борис Михайлович Азарх). He was born on October 29, 1903, in Riga, Russian Empire (now Latvia), in the family of guild merchant Moses Ber-Itsikovich Azarh (1869, Velizh – 1941, Riga) and Miriam-Basi Leizerovna Gottlieb (1876, Moscow – 1941, Riga). His older brother was Alexei Mikhailovich Granovsky. In the 1920s, Alexei worked in theatre, founding the Moscow State Jewish Theatre (GOSET), which he also directed. In 1928, Alexei went on tour with the theater and stayed in Berlin, and then moved to Paris. Another brother was Leonid Mikhailovich Azarh (March 20, 1900, Riga – 1964, Paris), a French film editor and film editor, and participant in the Second World War; before emigration he served as the Commissar of the USSR. He also had a sister, Fanny Mikhailovna Pevzner.

== Career ==
In the beginning of his career in Russia, Boris Ingster met Sergei Eisenstein in 1922 in Moscow, when Ingster was an acting student and Eisenstein was a play director. Ingster saw him directing an Alexander Ostrovsky play with a bizarre, circus-like stage, complete with a tightrope, even though the play was from a realistic genre. Ingster approached Eisenstein after the play to ask about the unusual re-casting of the setting. In the 1920s, Ingster emigrated to France, where in 1930 he was an assistant to Sergei Eisenstein on the set of the film Sentimental Romance (1930).

He moved to the United States, where he began to work in film and television; he was a screenwriter on various films, including The Story of Alexander Graham Bell. He directed his first film in 1940 with Stranger on the Third Floor, on which he also was a writer. This film is now most commonly cited as the first "true" film noir. In 1943, he contributed screenwriting to the MGM propaganda film Song of Russia, which led to controversy due to concerns it had a pro-Soviet bias. In 1947, he wrote and directed the comedy The Judge Steps Out. By the 1950s, Ingster switched much of his attention to television work. He produced 25 episodes of the Western Wagon Train series, 18 episodes of the drama series The Roaring 20's, 11 episodes of another Western, Cheyenne, and 38 episodes of the spy-thriller series The Man from U.N.C.L.E..

== Personal life ==
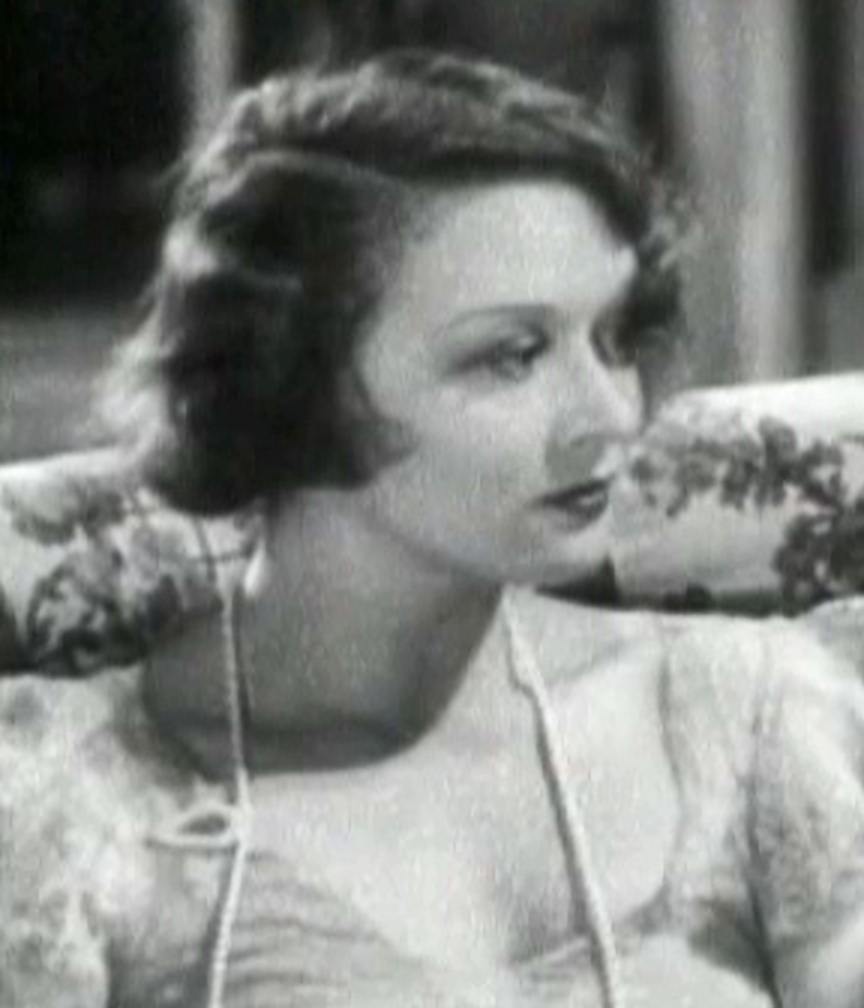
Actress Leni Stengel was Ingster's first wife.

Boris married actress Leni Stengel in 1930, Wilma Ingster in 1938, Hungarian actress Zita Perczel in 1944 (they divorced in 1954), and Christiane Ingster-Oshay (née Deleval, later Oshay) in 1955. With Christiane, he had a son, Michael in 1962.

== Filmography ==
- The Last Days of Pompeii (1935), screenwriter
- Dancing Pirate (1936), screenwriter
- Thin Ice (1937), screenwriter
- I'll Give a Million (1938), screenwriter
- Happy Landing (1938), screenwriter
- Stranger on the Third Floor (1940), director
- Paris Underground (1945), screenwriter
- The Judge Steps Out (1948), director, screenwriter, screen story
- Southside 1-1000 (1950), director and screenwriter
- Something for the Birds (1952), screenwriter
- Abdulla the Great (1956), screenwriter
- Guns of Diablo (1964), director and producer
- The Spy in the Green Hat (1966), producer
- One of Our Spies Is Missing (1966), producer
- The Karate Killers (1967), producer
