= Burnet Hershey =

War correspondent (1896–1971)

Burnet Hershey (13 December 1896 – 13 December 1971) was a war correspondent and writer of plays, screenplays, and books including accounts based on his experiences during the World War I and World War II eras. His work includes screenplays and an article on the munitions trade that was adapted to film.

He was born in Romania and came to the United States with his parents Josef Hirsh Bertha née Bughici Hirsh in 1899. He went to public schools in New York City and Columbia University School of Journalism. He had a brother Abraham and two sisters, Epvira and Elizabeth.

He reported for the New York Evening Post before and during World War I and for The New York Sun. He also reported abroad during World War II.

He was a member of the Overseas Press Club, The Silurians, and The Lambs.

Columbia University has some of his manuscripts.

== Bibliography ==
- "Dealers in Death", about the munitions trade
- The Brown Danube, a play about the Nazi takeover of Austria in 1938
- The Bloody Record of Nazi Atrocities (1944)
- Trial by Fire (1964)
- From a Reporter's Little Black Book (1967)
- The Odyssey of Henry Ford and The Great Peace Ship (1967) based on his experience aboard the ship
- You Can't Get to Heaven on a Roller Skate (1969)

== Filmography ==
- The News Parade (1928)
- Africa Shrieks (1931)
- Stars of Yesterday (1931)
- The Sea Ghost (1931)
- That Goes Double (1932), story
- Million Dollar Melody (1933), screenplay
- Pleasure Island (1933), co-wrote story with A. Dorian Otvos
- Henry the Ache (1933), co-writer
- Bubbling Over (film) (1934)
- Dealers in Death (1934)
- All American Drawback (1935), story
- Speed Devils (film) (1935)
- Double Exposure (1936), story
- Inside Information (1939 film), based on an unpublished novel he co-wrote
