= Armstrong's Theatre of Today =

- Other names: The Armstrong Theater of Today
- Genre: Romantic drama
- Running time: 30 minutes
- Country of origin: United States
- Language(s): English
- Syndicates: CBS
- Starring: Hollywood stars
- Announcer: George Bryan; Tom Shirley; Bob Sherry
- Directed by: Ira Avery; Al Ward
- Produced by: Ira Avery
- Original release: October 4, 1941 – May 22, 1954
- Sponsored by: Armstrong Cork Company; Cream of Wheat

Armstrong's Theatre of Today is a news and romantic drama radio program which was broadcast at noon on Saturdays by CBS Radio from October 4, 1941, to May 22, 1954. The 30-minute series was sponsored by the Armstrong Cork Company (Armstrong Quaker Rugs and Linoleum) and Cream of Wheat (1953–54).

The announcers were Bob Sherry, George Bryan and Tom Shirley. The program opened with Bryan reporting the news, followed by Hollywood film actors in original dramas. Ira Avery and Al Ward directed with Avery producing. James Rinaldi provided the special effects. Commercials were read by the Armstrong Quaker Girl (Elizabeth Reller, Julie Conway).

Harold Levey was the musical director.

Featured actors included Joan Alexander, Sandy Becker, Ralph Bellamy, Jeanne Cagney Madeleine Carroll, Cathleen Cordell Kenny Delmar, Ellen Drew, Madge Evans, Geraldine Fitzgerald, Helen Hayes, Vinton Hayworth, Edward Everett Horton, Teri Keane, John Larkin Francis Lederer, Grace Matthews, Karen Morley, Pat O'Brien, Vincent Price, Bill Quinn, Rosalind Russell, Marian Shockley, Franchot Tone, Mary K. Wells, and Bill Zuckert.

Stars over Hollywood, another anthology program, also began in 1941, and when Armstrong began it immediately followed Stars on the air. That combination "gave CBS the edge in the Saturday dramatic derby for thirteen years."

== See also ==
- Armstrong World Industries
