= Guns of Diablo =

1965 American western film

- Theatrical release poster
- Directed by: Boris Sagal and Boris Ingster
- Written by: Berne Giler (screenplay); Robert Lewis Taylor (novel)
- Produced by: Boris Ingster
- Starring: Charles Bronson; Susan Oliver; Kurt Russell
- Cinematography: John M. Nickolaus Jr.
- Edited by: Harry Coswick
- Music by: Leigh Harline; Walter Scharf; Harry Sukman
- Distributed by: Metro-Goldwyn-Mayer (MGM)
- Release date: January 29, 1965
- Running time: 91 minutes
- Country: United States
- Language: English

Guns of Diablo is a Metrocolor 1965 Western film directed by Boris Sagal, produced by Boris Ingster, and starring Charles Bronson, Susan Oliver and Kurt Russell. It follows a wagon train master, who runs into difficulties when he meets his girlfriend Maria, now married to Rance Macklin, whose father owned a ranch that Murdock once worked on.

This is an expanded version of the last episode of MGM-TV's brief series The Travels of Jaimie McPheeters ("The Day of the Reckoning"), originally telecast in black and white over ABC on March 15, 1964. Russ Conway refilmed Dan O'Herlihy's original scenes as Russell's father for this adaptation.

== Plot ==
Teenage boy, Jamie (Kurt Russell), travels west on a wagon train with his father. When the convoy needs supplies, they stop near a small town where the experienced, armed wagon train master, Linc Murdock (Charles Bronson), runs into his ex-girlfriend Maria (Susan Oliver). Murdock finds out that she has married Rance Macklin (Jan Merlin), whose father owned a ranch that Murdock once worked on. The two men have a history, as Murdock was responsible for Macklin losing his right arm in a gun fight. Macklin's brothers hold Murdock prisoner in the town until Macklin can arrive. Macklin seeks revenge on his rival by arranging for a gun duel. After Murdock kills Macklin in a gunfight, during which his brothers are also killed, Murdock, Maria, the teen and his father end up going on with the wagon train to hunt for a gold mine.

== Cast ==
- Charles Bronson as Linc Murdock
- Susan Oliver as Maria Macklin
- Kurt Russell as Jamie McPheeters
- Jan Merlin as Rance Macklin
- John Fiedler as Ives
- Douglas Fowley as Mr. Knudsen
- Rayford Barnes as Dan Macklin
- Ron Hagerthy as Carey Macklin
- Robert Carricart as Mendez
- Morris Ankrum as Ray Macklin
- Russ Conway as Doctor McPheeters
- Maurice Wells as Girard
- Mike De Anda as Bryce (the Blacksmith) (as Mike de Anda)
- Susan Flannery as Molly

== See also ==
- List of American films of 1965
