= Dealers in Death =

1934 documentary film

- Directed by: Burnet Hershey
- Written by: Burnet Hershey
- Produced by: Monroe Shaff
- Narrated by: Basil Ruysdael
- Cinematography: Basil Wright
- Edited by: Allyn B. Carrick; Milton Salzberg
- Music by: Willy Stahl
- Production company: Topical Films
- Release date: December 13, 1934
- Running time: 63 or 68 mins
- Country: United States
- Language: English

Dealers in Death is a 1934 documentary film on the defense industry. It implied that the First World War was fought for the benefit of arms dealers such as Basil Zaharoff and claims that moves toward rearmament and war in the mid-1930s were prompted by the same interests.

Walter B. Pitkin served as editorial advisor.

== Synopsis ==
The film begins with a quote from Franklin D. Roosevelt stating that people are being taxed to poverty to support armaments. He claims that this grave threat to peace is "in no small part due to the uncontrolled activities of the manufacturers and merchants of destruction". A montage of images of the First World War follows, ending in images of dead soldiers and full cemeteries. Death checks over a balance sheet listing the casualties of the war and the profits made by arms manufacturers.

Then the narrations begins: Some innocent people thought that the Paris Peace Conference would bring peace, but the post-war treaties only created more ethnic strife, for example, in the Polish Corridor. This only benefits the arms manufactuers who are selling to the governments of Europe and dictators such as Stalin, Mussolini and Hitler.

Specific armaments companies are called out

- Vickers-Armstrongs in the United Kingdom
- Schneider-Creusot of France
- Krupp in Germany, which it claims was making armaments in violation of the Treaty of Versailles

While these different manufacturers are based in different countries, behind the scenes they co-operate. The documentary claims that Krupp created a special fuse for hand grenades that was copied during the war by Vickers. After the war Krupp sued Vickers for patent infringement, asking a shilling a fuse for killing their own people, but the issue was settled out of court. During the war, German arms manufacturers lacked nickel, copper and aluminum, so French manufactures sent them raw materials through Switzerland, thereby prolonging the conflict. In another example of co-operation - once the Germans captured Briey, which contained important mines and iron smelters. This town was not bombed during the war, and when a general attempted it, he was reassigned. The Germans reciprocally left the French town of Dombasle-sur-Meurthe alone. This all was supposedly brought out after the war by French officers who wanted to bomb Briey, but were told not to.

With the ending of the First World War, the arms manufacturers then begin arming the factions in different conflicts, including the Russian Civil War, Hungarian–Romanian War, the Rif War and the Polish–Soviet War. Until the present day (1934) when the assassinations of Dollfus and King Alexander of Yugoslavia have brought another war scare.

More statistics and numbers are brought out about the land and sea armaments of various countries - however no sources are given. The documentary claims that chemical weapons are being developed despite the international ban on them. This is also claimed for biological weapons. The films claims that war propaganda is being fomented by radio and the print press, while patriotic societies, recruitment drives and education prepare the youth for war.

Small scale arms trade is alleged to be carried on to Latin America by clandestine shipments from New Orleans and New York. The firm of Bannerman and Sons is singled out, as well as their island and illustrated catalog of military surplus supplies, which supposedly operate as a conduit for this trade.

== Reception ==
It was noted in reviews that the film had come out at the same time the Nye Committee hearings on armaments manufacturers began. It was also noted that while foreign arms dealers were singled out, few American firms were mentioned by name, though Du Pont, Remington and Colt plants were shown. A portion of the film detailed the rise of Hitler and Fritz Thyssens sponsorship of him.
