= Hollywood Speaks =

1932 film

- Directed by: Edward Buzzell
- Written by: Norman Krasna; Jo Swerling
- Based on: story by Norman Krasna
- Starring: Genevieve Tobin; Pat O'Brien; Leni Stengel
- Cinematography: Ted Tetzlaff
- Edited by: Gene Havlick
- Production company: Columbia Pictures
- Distributed by: Columbia Pictures
- Release date: June 25, 1932
- Running time: 71 minutes
- Country: United States
- Language: English

Hollywood Speaks is a 1932 American Pre-Code comedy film directed by Edward Buzzell and starring Genevieve Tobin, Pat O'Brien and Leni Stengel. It was produced and distributed by Columbia Pictures.

== Plot ==
A despairing young actress is stopped from committing suicide by a gossip columnist who decides to fashion her into a major star.

== Cast ==
- Genevieve Tobin as Gertrude Smith, later known as Greta Swan
- Pat O'Brien as Jimmy Reed
- Lucien Prival as Frederick Landau
- Ralf Harolde as Carp
- Rita La Roy as Millie Coreen
- Leni Stengel as Mrs. Landau
- Anderson Lawlor as Joe Hammond
- Jack Holt as himself

== Production ==
Columbia announced the film in August 1931.

It was Norman Krasna's first film under his contract with Columbia and he started writing it in April 1932. The same amount the studio announced Eddie Buzzel would direct and Genevieve Tobin would star.

== Reception ==
The Los Angeles Times called it a "routine melodrama with little to say of interest."
