= Half Shot at Sunrise =

1930 film

- Directed by: Paul Sloane
- Written by: Anne Caldwell; James Ashmore Creelman; Ralph Spence; Fatty Arbuckle
- Produced by: William LeBaron
- Starring: Bert Wheeler; Robert Woolsey; Dorothy Lee
- Cinematography: Nicholas Musuraca
- Edited by: Arthur Roberts
- Music by: Max Steiner
- Production company: RKO Radio Pictures
- Distributed by: RKO Radio Pictures
- Release date: October 4, 1930 (US)
- Running time: 78 minutes
- Country: United States
- Language: English
- Budget: $529,000
- Box office: $929,000

Half Shot at Sunrise (1930) by Paul Sloane

Half Shot at Sunrise is a 1930 American pre-Code comedy film starring the comedy duo Wheeler & Woolsey and Dorothy Lee. Their fourth film together, it was the second starring vehicle for the two, following the success of The Cuckoos, which had been released earlier in 1930. Directed by Paul Sloane, from a screenplay by Anne Caldwell, James Ashmore Creelman, Ralph Spence, and Fatty Arbuckle, which had been tailored to highlight the comedic talents of Wheeler and Woolsey. In 1958, the film entered the public domain in the United States because the claimants did not renew its copyright registration in the 28th year after publication.

== Plot ==
During World War I, two American Doughboys, Tommy Turner and Gilbert Simpson, are more interested in picking up girls than in military duty. In Paris, they go AWOL in order to follow their libertine pursuits. They alternate between impersonating officers in order to impress the ladies, and avoiding being found out by the military police. During their hijinks, the pair accidentally steal the car of Colonel Marshall (their commanding officer), which is how Tommy meets and falls in love with Annette, who unbeknownst to him is Colonel Marshall's younger daughter.

The Colonel has been tasked with organizing a major offensive at the front. His older daughter, Eileen, is in love with a young Lieutenant, Jim Reed. The Colonel intends to send Reed to the front with the orders. However, to get Tommy and Gilbert back in the Colonel's good graces, Annette and the Colonel's paramour, Olga, who has taken an interest in Gilbert, scheme by stealing the orders from Reed and giving them to the boys, so that they can be the ones to carry them to the front.

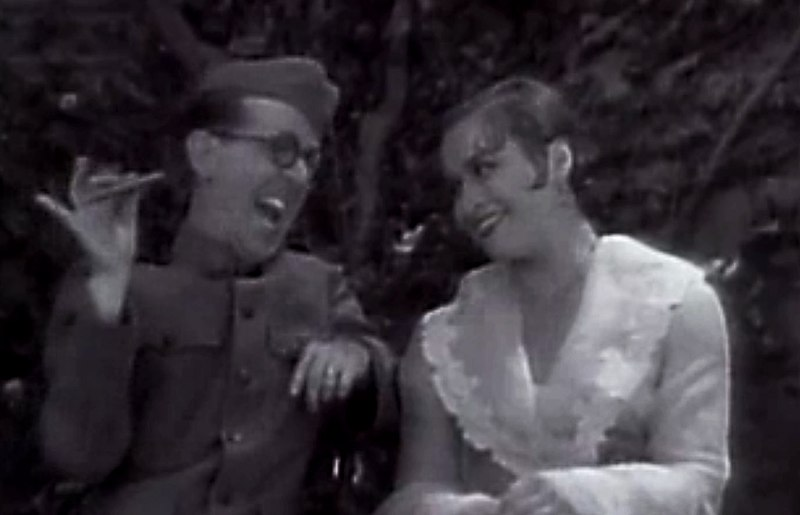
Half Shot at Sunrise with Robert Woolsey and Leni Stengel

After a dramatic scene at the front, the two are apprehended by the MPs, and brought to Colonel Marshall, for justice. He readies the firing squad, but after the two point out that the "secret papers" they were carrying to the commanding General, was actually a love letter from Olga to the very married Colonel. The Colonel then agrees to allow Tommy to marry his youngest daughter Annette and Gilbert will marry Olga. The Colonel also gives his consent to the marriage between his oldest daughter, Eileen, and Jim Reed.

== Cast ==
- Bert Wheeler as Tommy Turner
- Robert Woolsey as Gilbert Simpson
- Dorothy Lee as Annette Marshall
- Hugh Trevor as Lieutenant Jim Reed
- Edna May Oliver as Mrs. Marshall
- Eddie De Lange as MP
- E. H. Calvert as General Hale
- Alan Roscoe as Captain Jones
- John Rutherford as MP Sergeant
- George MacFarlane as Colonel Marshall
- Roberta Robinson as Eileen Marshall
- Leni Stengel as Olga

(Cast list as per AFI database)

== Reception ==
The film made a profit of $400,000.

== Notes ==
Roscoe "Fatty" Arbuckle was an uncredited writer on the screenplay.

This would be the first musical director credit for the Academy Award winner, Max Steiner, who would go on to score many other films, including Gone With the Wind, Casablanca, King Kong, and over 300 more films.

A precision dance routine is credited to the Tiller Sunshine Girls. Mary Read is credited with choreography.

The songs, "Nothing But Love" and "Whistling the Blues Away," had words by Anne Caldwell, with music by Harry Tierney.

In 1958, the film entered the public domain in the United States because the claimants did not renew its copyright registration in the 28th year after publication.
