= Thin Ice (1937 film) =

1937 film by Sidney Lanfield

- Film poster by Joseph A. Maturo
- Directed by: Sidney Lanfield
- Written by: Attila Orbók (play); Boris Ingster; Milton Sperling
- Produced by: Raymond Griffith
- Starring: Sonja Henie; Tyrone Power; Arthur Treacher; Raymond Walburn; Joan Davis; Sig Ruman
- Cinematography: Edward Cronjager; Robert H. Planck
- Edited by: Robert L. Simpson
- Music by: Mack Gordon; Sidney D. Mitchell; Lew Pollack; Harry Revel
- Production company: Twentieth Century-Fox
- Distributed by: Twentieth Century-Fox
- Release date: September 3, 1937
- Running time: 79 minutes
- Country: United States
- Language: English
- Box office: $1.59 million (U.S. and Canada rentals)

Thin Ice is a 1937 American romantic comedy film directed by Sidney Lanfield and starring Tyrone Power and figure skater Sonja Henie. The supporting cast includes Arthur Treacher, Raymond Walburn and Joan Davis. It was produced and distributed by Twentieth Century-Fox.

== Plot ==
The plot follows Lili Heiser (Henie), a skate instructor who works at a luxury hotel in the Swiss Alps. She falls in love with a man who goes skiing every morning (Power), thinking he is an ordinary tourist, unaware that he is a prince seeking to escape the demands of royal life.

The movie showcased Sonja Henie's skating talents. After winning gold in the 1928, 1932 and 1936 Winter Olympics, Henie became a professional film actress in 1936.

The film also features Tyrone Power early in his career.

== Reception ==
The movie was nominated for an Academy Award for Best Dance Direction for the 'Prince Igor Suite'.

Filmink called it "Very light but fun."
