= The Girl in the Glass Cage =

1929 film by Ralph Dawson

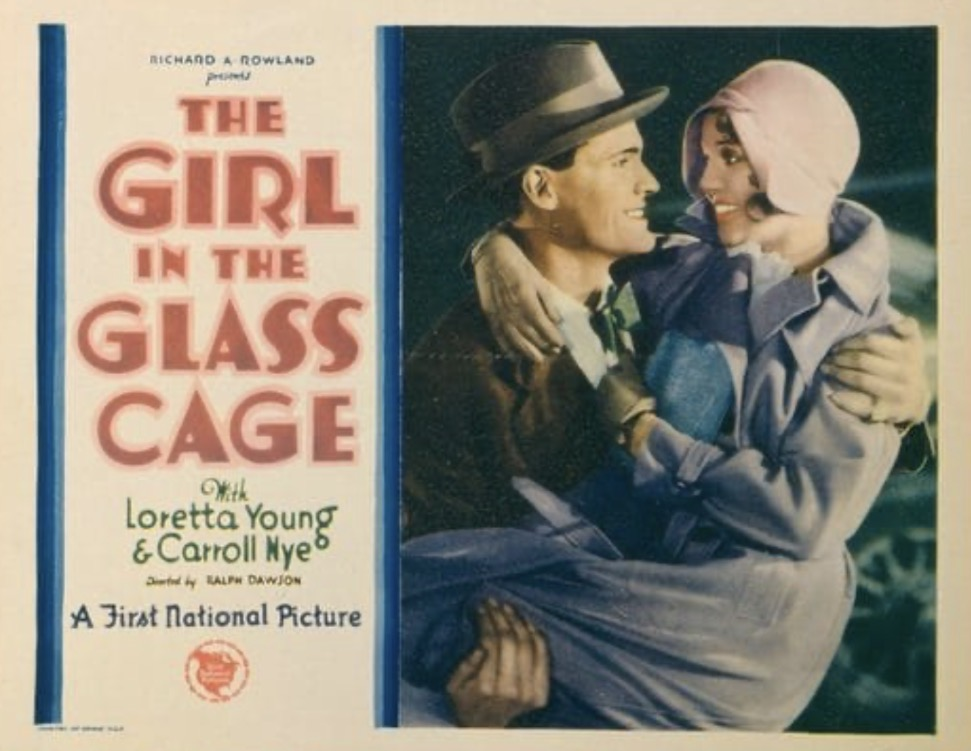
- Lobby Card
- Directed by: Ralph Dawson
- Written by: James Gruen; Paul Perez (titles)
- Screenplay by: Paul Perez
- Based on: The Girl in the Glass Cage by George Kibbe Turner
- Starring: Loretta Young; Carroll Nye; Matthew Betz; Lucien Littlefield; Ralph Lewis
- Cinematography: Ernest Haller
- Edited by: Terry O. Morse
- Production company: First National Pictures
- Distributed by: Warner Bros. Pictures
- Release date: June 23, 1929
- Running time: 80 minutes; 8 reels
- Country: United States
- Languages: Sound (Part-Talkie); English Intertitles

The Girl in the Glass Cage is a 1929 American sound part-talkie crime drama film directed by Ralph Dawson and starring Loretta Young, Carroll Nye, Matthew Betz, Lucien Littlefield, and Ralph Lewis. In addition to sequences with audible dialogue or talking sequences, the film features a synchronized musical score and sound effects along with English intertitles. The original part-talkie version featured dialogue for a duration of 65 percent of its running time. According to the film review in Variety, the film was withdrawn shortly after being released and re-released with synchronized musical score with sound effects only due to an unspecified defect in the sound recording. The soundtrack was recorded using the Vitaphone sound-on-disc system. The film is based on the 1927 novel of the same name by George Kibbe Turner. It was released by Warner Bros. Pictures on June 23, 1929.

== Plot ==
In the grimy mill town of Pomfret Center, New York, orphaned teenager Gladys Cosgrove lives with her embittered uncle John Cosgrove, a drunken court reporter, in a bleak and decaying house. Working at the box office of the local Elysium Theatre, Gladys endures the daily humiliation of being mocked and harassed by the town's loafers, especially the leering speakeasy owner “Doc” Striker, his dimwitted crony Carlos, and swaggering playboy Sheik Smith.

One evening, as their torment escalates, she is rescued by Terry Pomfret, a college student from the town's founding family, recently returned for summer vacation. Though promised by his aristocratic mother Mrs. Pomfret to socialite Isabelle Van Court, Terry is drawn to Gladys's quiet strength and dignity. A tentative romance blossoms between the pair, despite her uncle's erratic opposition.

When Terry brings Gladys to the Pomfret estate, his mother confronts them and quickly disapproves of the match. She convinces Gladys to end things for Terry's sake. Terry reluctantly returns to school, but—worried for her safety—gives her a pistol. Gladys writes to assure him she's doing well, but the local thugs continue to harass her. Unbeknownst to them all, Carlos, seemingly the fool, sends a secret letter to Terry warning him.

Terry rushes back, confronts Striker, and beats him soundly—only to then find Sheik Smith in Gladys's bedroom. Misunderstanding the scene, Terry denounces Gladys and storms out. Smith is found dead soon after, and Gladys, believing Terry killed him, falsely confesses to the murder to protect him. She is arrested, tried, and convicted—her spirit shattered when she learns Terry has returned to Isabelle.

At her sentencing, Gladys shocks the courtroom by claiming she had an affair with Smith—desperate to free Terry. This confession infuriates Terry and his questionable reaction makes him a suspect in the murder. The court sets Gladys free, but Terry is placed under investigation. Gladys, turning advocate, cross-examines Striker and Carlos, skillfully unraveling the lies. Ultimately, her uncle John Cosgrove, broken by guilt, confesses: in a drunken rage, he mistook Smith for Terry and killed him. Cosgrove then kills Striker and takes his own life.

With the truth revealed, Terry is exonerated. He and Gladys are reunited—his family, moved by her courage and self-sacrifice, finally gives their blessing.

== Cast ==
- Loretta Young as Gladys Cosgrove
- Carroll Nye as Terry Pomfret
- Matthew Betz as 'Doc' Striker
- Lucien Littlefield as Sheik Smith
- Ralph Lewis as John Cosgrove
- George E. Stone as Carlos
- Julia Swayne Gordon as Mrs. Pomfret
- Majel Coleman as Isabelle Van Court
- Charles Sellon as Dan Jackson – Prosecutor
- Robert T. Haines as Pomfret

== Music ==
The film features a theme song entitled "Every Little While (I Think Of You)" which was composed by John McLaughlin and Harold Levey.

== Preservation ==
The film is now considered lost.

== See also ==
- List of early sound feature films (1926–1929)
