= Man About Town (1932 film) =

1932 film

- Directed by: John Francis Dillon
- Screenplay by: Leon Gordon
- Starring: Warner Baxter; Karen Morley; Conway Tearle; Alan Mowbray; Leni Stengel; Lilian Bond
- Cinematography: James Wong Howe
- Edited by: Frank Hull
- Music by: George Lipschultz
- Production company: Fox Film Corporation
- Distributed by: Fox Film Corporation
- Release date: May 22, 1932
- Running time: 71 minutes
- Country: United States
- Language: English

Man About Town is a 1932 American drama film directed by John Francis Dillon and written by Leon Gordon. The film stars Warner Baxter, Karen Morley, Conway Tearle, Alan Mowbray, Leni Stengel and Lilian Bond. The film was released on May 22, 1932, by Fox Film Corporation.

== Cast ==
- Warner Baxter as Stephen Morrow
- Karen Morley as Helena
- Conway Tearle as Bob Ashley
- Alan Mowbray as Ivan Boris
- Leni Stengel as Countess Vonesse
- Lilian Bond as Carlotta Cortez
- Lawrence Grant as Count Vonesse
- Halliwell Hobbes as Hilton
