= Life Begins at 40 (film) =

1935 film by George Marshall

- Directed by: George Marshall
- Written by: Walter B. Pitkin (book); Lamar Trotti; Robert Quillen (add. dialogue); William M. Conselman (uncredited); Dudley Nichols (uncredited)
- Produced by: Sol M. Wurtzel
- Starring: Will Rogers; Richard Cromwell; George Barbier; Rochelle Hudson; Thomas Beck; Jane Darwell
- Production company: Fox Film Corporation
- Distributed by: Fox Film Corporation
- Release date: March 22, 1935
- Running time: 85 minutes
- Country: United States
- Language: English

Life Begins at 40 is a 1935 black-and-white film starring Will Rogers and Richard Cromwell. It is based on the non-fiction self-help book Life Begins at Forty by Walter B. Pitkin.

== Plot ==
Kenesaw H.Clark is a small town newspaper editor and publisher. He is operating on a shoestring budget and sometimes accepts livestock in lieu of cash.

When Clark hires an ex-convict Lee Austin to work on the paper, pompous town banker Colonel Abercrombie raises the roof. Austin had been jailed for a theft from his bank when he worked there as a teller. Clark has doubts about Austin's guilt and refuses to fire him. Abercrombie takes revenge by calling in his loans on the newspaper. Clark does his best to carry on, even printing the day's news on butcher paper.

Clark responds not with anger, but with humor. He hires a group of professional hog callers to disrupt a political speech by the Colonel. These individuals do their job a little too well, as a stampede of hogs answers the call and destroy the speaker's platform.

The actual thief from years ago was the Colonel's never-do-well son Joe, who has long since lost the original money at the racetrack. One night, the Colonel surprises someone trying to crack his office safe. He shoots and wounds the intruder, not recognizing him as his son. The Colonel leads a lynch mob against Austin, and Clark has to fend them off single-handed. A policeman finally informs the Colonel that his son is in the hospital and has made a full confession.

Clark had figured out some time ago that the Colonel's son was the thief, but couldn't figure out how to gently break it to him.

== Cast ==
- Will Rogers as Kenesaw H. Clark
- Richard Cromwell as Lee Austin
- George Barbier as Col. Joseph Abercrombie
- Rochelle Hudson as Adele Anderson
- Jane Darwell as Ida Harris
- Slim Summerville as T. Watterson Meriwether
- Sterling Holloway as Chris
- Thomas Beck as Joe Abercrombie
- Roger Imhof as Pappy Smithers
- Charles Sellon as Tom Cotton
- John Bradford as Wally Stevens
- Ruth Gillette as Mrs. Cotton
- Hank Bell as Townsman (uncredited)
- Creighton Hale as Drug Clerk (uncredited)
