= Speed Devils (film) =

1935 film

- Directed by: Joseph Henabery
- Written by: Burnet Hershey
- Cinematography: Edwin B. DuPar; Ray Foster
- Edited by: Bert Frank
- Production company: Melbert Productions
- Distributed by: Mercury Film Exchanges
- Release date: July 1, 1935
- Running time: 61 minutes
- Country: United States
- Language: English

Speed Devils is a 1935 American film directed by Joseph Henabery, coproduced by Perfect Circle Piston Company and Warner Brothers, and released by Warner Brothers. The film is also known as Thru Traffic.

== Cast ==
- Paul Kelly as Martin Gray
- Marguerite Churchill as Pat Corey
- Russell Hardie as Dan Holden
- Leo Curley
- Walter Fenner
- Earl Mitchell
