= The Sea Ghost =

1931 film

- Directed by: William Nigh
- Written by: Burnet Hershey (story); William Nigh (scenario) and Jo Van Ronkel (scenario)
- Produced by: Sam Efrus (producer)
- Starring: Alan Hale; Clarence Wilson; Claud Allister; Laura La Plante
- Cinematography: Sidney Hickox
- Edited by: Tom Persons
- Production company: Peerless Pictures
- Distributed by: Peerless Pictures
- Release date: November 29, 1931
- Running time: 64 minutes
- Country: United States
- Language: English

The Sea Ghost is a 1931 American pre-Code film directed by William Nigh and starring Alan Hale, Clarence Wilson, Claud Allister and Laura La Plante. The film was retitled U 67 for its American reissue, stating in the foreword that "some of the scenes in this film show authentic exploits of the U 67 under actual wartime conditions".

== Plot ==
Navy Lieutenant Greg Winters is found guilty by a court-martial for pausing briefly to prepare to rescue survivors of the Alatania, a torpedoed ship, rather than attacking immediately the submarine responsible. As a result, he is sidelined for the rest of World War I.

In 1925 New Orleans, lawyer Henry Sykes hires now civilian Captain Winters for a salvage job on behalf of Evelyn Inchcape. Sykes insists on using his own deep sea diver to retrieve something from none other than the Alatania. After a box is brought up, Winters confronts the diver, who turns out to be Karl Ludwig, the commander of the submarine for whom Winters has been searching. He puts Ludwig in the brig, though he soon escapes.

Then Winters goes to see Sykes and Inchcape. Inchcape's wealthy uncle and cousin lost their lives aboard the Alatania. Winters reports he has recovered two wills, one leaving a million dollar estate to Inchcape, the other to the cousin, whom Sykes implies is still alive. Now, after seven years, the uncle can be declared legally dead. Winters is willing to split the money with either party. Despite his professed indifference to Inchcape's beauty and her loathing of men in general, when they are alone, he gives her the first option. She despises him, but he tears the will in her favor in two and gives her half. Later, he sees Sykes at his office and, while pretending to bargain, learns that the cousin is actually dead; Sykes intended to produce an imposter.

Sykes bribes Winters' first mate and some men to betray him. When Winters goes to settle accounts with Ludwig, he is ambushed and knocked out (though Ludwig has no part in it). Sykes kidnaps Inchcape and sets sail on Winters' ship. In a cabin, Sykes attempts to force himself on Inchcape, but she is rescued by Ludwig. They have a talk. Meanwhile, Winters, accompanied by his friend, ineffectual upper class lawyer Percy Atwater, boards the ship and subdues the crew.

Then he gets his long-awaited bout with Ludwig. Just as Winters is about to choke the life out of his hated foe, Inchcape shows him a letter in which Ludwig's sweetheart informs him that she will be sailing on the Alatania. Ludwig received it after the sinking. Winters acknowledges that Ludwig has suffered enough and lets him go.

Afterward, Winters forces Sykes to marry him and Inchcape, before having the lawyer tossed overboard.

== Cast ==
As listed in the opening credits:

- Alan Hale as Capt. Greg Winters
- Clarence Wilson as Henry Sykes
- Claud Allister as Percy Atwater
- Laura La Plante as Evelyn Inchcape
- Peter Erkelenz as Capt. Karl Ludwig (as Peter Erkeleng)
- William Nestell
- Jack Richardson
