= The Animal Kingdom (1932 film) =

1932 film

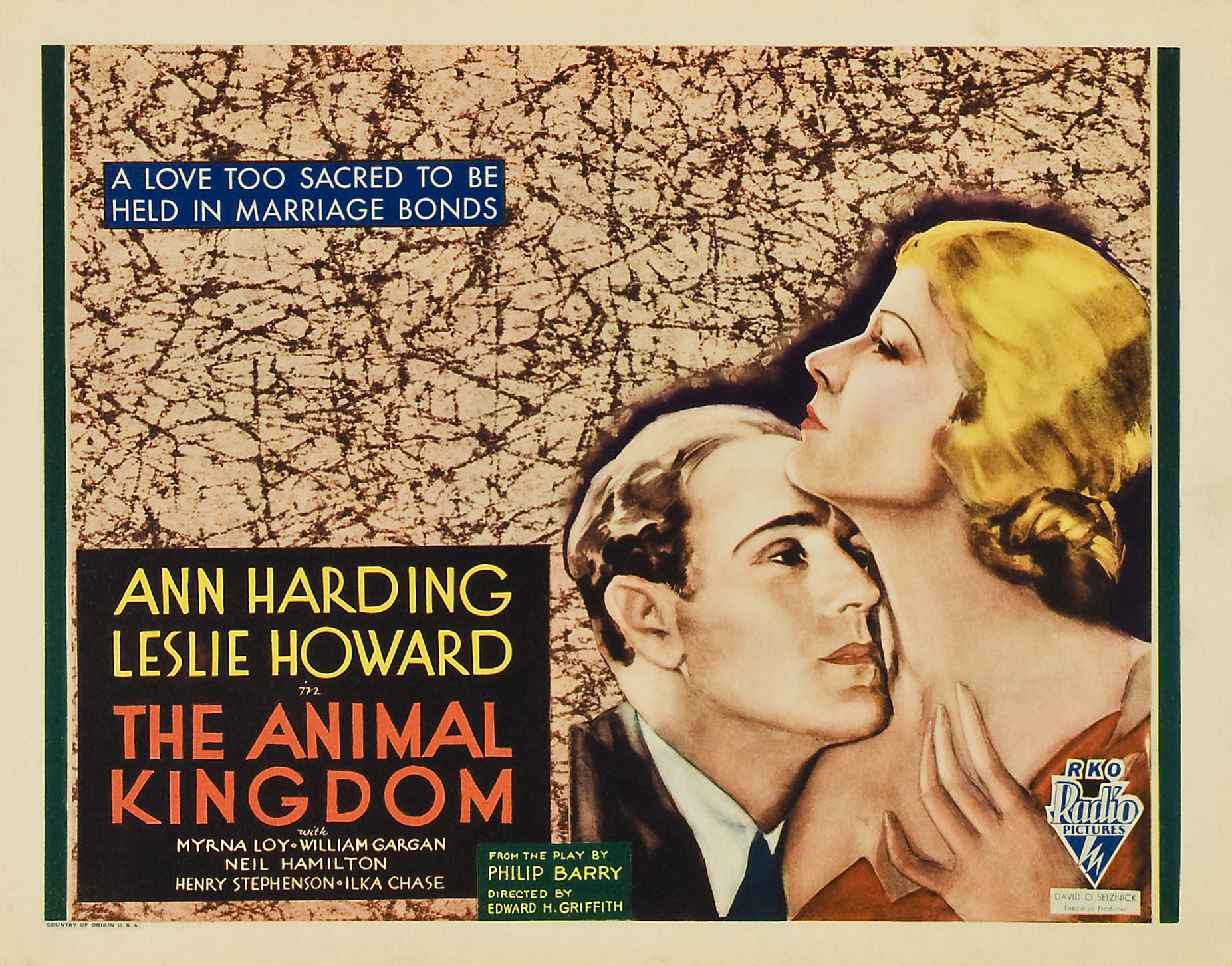
- Theatrical release poster
- Directed by: Edward H. Griffith; George Cukor (uncredited) Tommy Atkins (assistant)
- Screenplay by: Horace Jackson; Edward H. Griffith(uncredited); Adela Rogers St. Johns(uncredited)
- Based on: The Animal Kingdom; 1932 play by Philip Barry
- Produced by: David O. Selznick
- Starring: Ann Harding; Leslie Howard; Myrna Loy
- Cinematography: George J. Folsey
- Edited by: Daniel Mandell
- Music by: Max Steiner
- Production company: RKO Radio Pictures
- Distributed by: RKO Radio Pictures
- Release date: December 28, 1932 (US)
- Running time: 85 minutes
- Country: United States
- Language: English
- Budget: $458,000
- Box office: $528,000

The Animal Kingdom (1932)

The Animal Kingdom (also known as The Woman in His House in the UK) is a 1932 American pre-Code comedy-drama film directed by Edward H. Griffith based upon a comedy of manners play of the same name by Philip Barry. The film stars Leslie Howard, Ann Harding, Myrna Loy, William Gargan, Ilka Chase, and Neil Hamilton. Howard, Gargan, and Chase also starred in the play when it opened on Broadway on January 12, 1932. It was remade 1946 as One More Tomorrow.

== Plot ==
Leni Stengel, with Don Dillaway and Ann Harding in The Animal Kingdom (1932)

Tom Collier owns a small press that publishes deluxe books. He has been living in the city with his best friend and lover Daisy Sage without being married. Daisy is a successful commercial artist for a fashion magazine. She has just returned from three months in Paris. While Daisy was away, Tom has fallen in love with Cecelia Henry.

Tom's wealthy banker father, Rufus Collier, describes his lifelong frustration with his son to Cecelia and Owen Fiske, a family friend and attorney. Tom has had every advantage, including education at both Harvard and Oxford, and a position at the bank, yet he is an idler and his friends are uncouth. His father is now afraid that Tom might actually marry Daisy. Cecelia reassures him on that score: She is going to marry Tom in June. Owen is surprised and crushed—he thought that she loved him—but Tom's father doesn't notice and approves wholeheartedly.

Tom visits Daisy to tell her of his impending marriage, but before he can, she asks him to marry her long enough to father a child. When he tells her of his current marriage plans, he anticipates they'll remain friends, but Daisy is hurt and sends him away, saying "Good-Bye...’til Doomsday". Soon, Cecelia has persuaded Tom to publish a book that is "the worst tripe" that his press has ever published, but it sells wonderfully. She talks him into publishing bad books that will make money and getting rid of his old friends, including "Red", his prize-fighter friend and butler. She wants Tom to sell his publishing company, live in the city with his father as a "proper gentleman" and take their place in society, a prospect that Tom has been resisting all his life.

Despite her realization that she loves him deeply, Daisy avoids all contact with Tom, but it pains her and the friends she and Tom share to see him living a life he detests. Tom complains that he's losing his soul and integrity. Finally, when Cecelia offers Tom champagne to toast selling his publishing company and moving in with his father, Tom realizes that Cecelia's bedroom suite reminds him of a brothel he used to visit, as he says, "in vino veritas". When Red tells Tom he is going back to the city, that he can't stomach being at that house any longer, Tom insists on driving him to the station, saying, "I'm going back to my wife", referring to Daisy. As he leaves, he signs over to Cecelia a large birthday check from his father, and puts it on the mantle, just as he used to leave money for the girls in the bordello.

== Cast ==
- Ann Harding as Daisy Sage, illustrator and artist
- Leslie Howard as Tom Collier
- Myrna Loy as Mrs. Cecelia 'Cee' Collier
- William Gargan as 'Red' Regan, Tom's Butler
- Neil Hamilton as Owen, a lawyer
- Ilka Chase as Grace - Cee's Friend
- Henry Stephenson as Mr Rufus Collier
- Leni Stengel as Franc Schmidt, Cellist, and Daisy's friend
- Don Dillaway as Joe Fiske - One of Tom's Authors

== Production ==
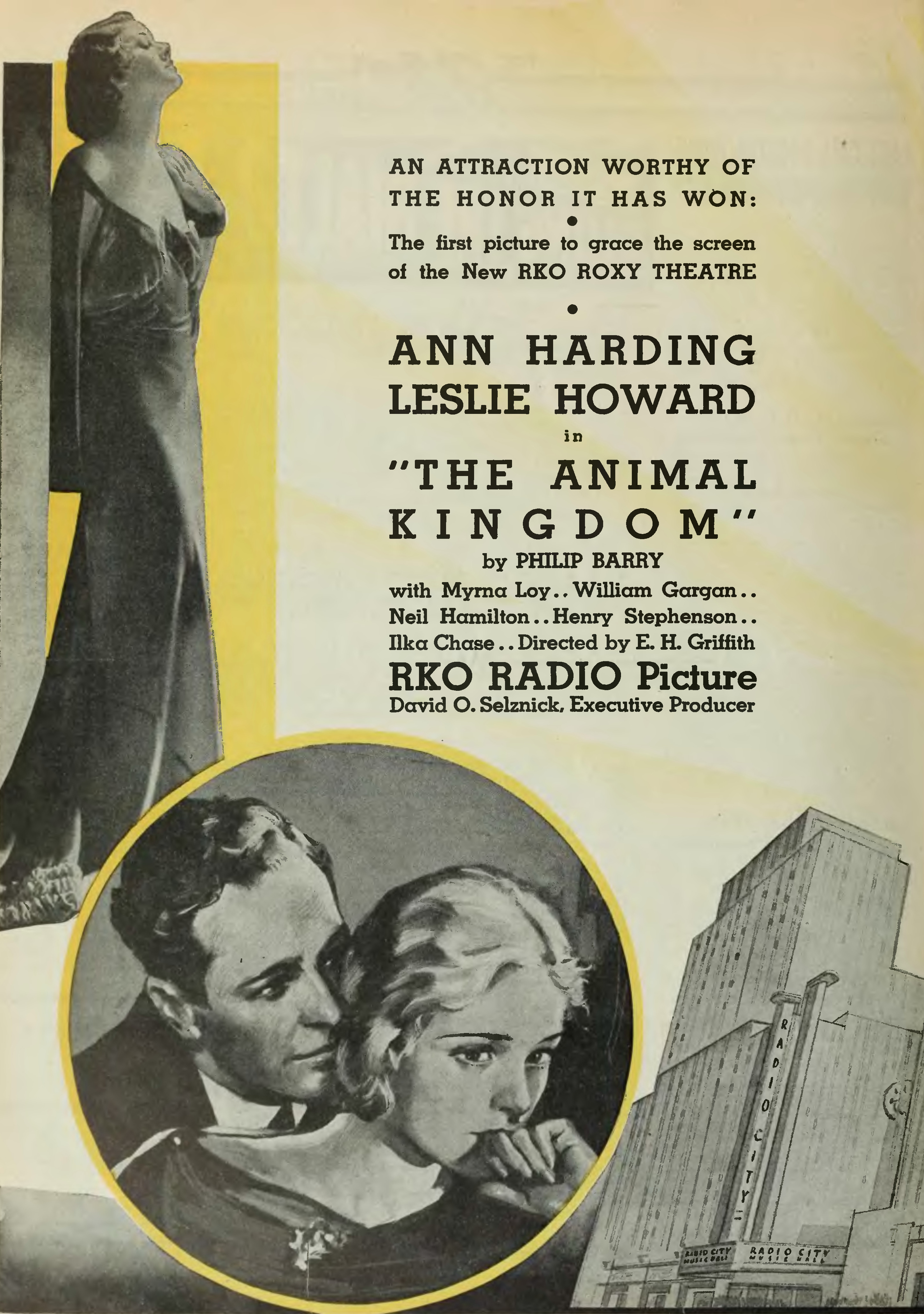
"The Animal Kingdom" ad from, The Film Daily, 1932

=== Writing ===
The film is based on a 1932 play by Philip Barry of the same name set in 1930s New York and Connecticut. The film deviates from the play in two areas: the play emphasizes the estrangement between Tom and his father, who has never visited his son's house before; and Owen, his one "respectable gentleman" friend, introduced Cecelia to Tom. These two elements are not as significant in the film.

=== Development ===
Although RKO originally purchased the film rights to The Animal Kingdom as a vehicle for Ann Harding, Irene Dunne was substituted when scheduling conflicts arose with Harding. In an ironic twist, when filming of Smilin' Through did not finish on time and MGM refused to release Leslie Howard to RKO to begin filming The Animal Kingdom at the scheduled time, RKO realized Ann Harding would now be available and reassigned her to the role.

== Reception ==
According to RKO records the film had a loss of $110,000 during its first year of release, in 1932–33.

== Legacy ==
In 1960, the film entered the public domain in the United States because the claimants did not renew its copyright registration in the 28th year after publication.

The film was preserved by the UCLA Film & Television Archive in 1985. (Source: UCLA Archive website)

Rare home movie footage taken on set during the production by co-star Leslie Howard and featuring candid footage of Ann Harding, Myrna Loy, William Gargan and director Edward H Griffith is included in the 2016 documentary Leslie Howard: The Man Who Gave a Damn.
