= Inside Information (1939 film) =

1939 film directed by Charles Lamont

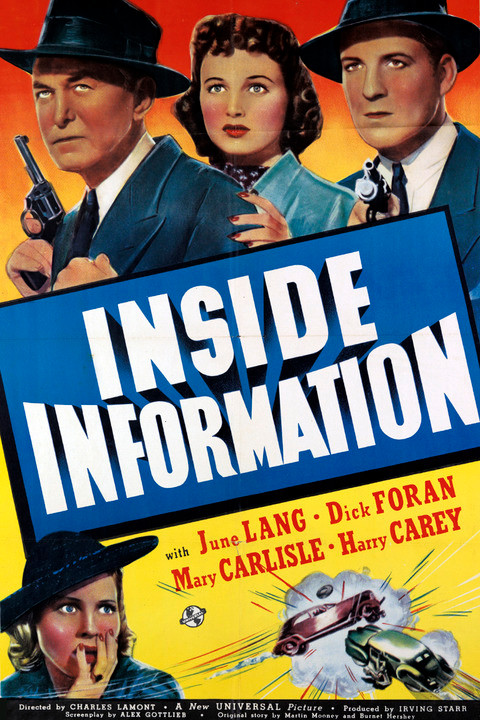
- Poster for the film
- Directed by: Charles Lamont
- Written by: Burnet Hershey and Martin Mooney
- Screenplay by: Alex Gottlieb
- Story by: Martin Mooney; Burnet Hershey
- Produced by: Irving Starr
- Starring: Dick Foran; Harry Carey; June Lang
- Cinematography: Arthur Martinelli
- Edited by: Harry Keller
- Production companies: Crime Club Productions, Inc.
- Distributed by: Universal Pictures
- Release date: June 2, 1939
- Running time: 61 minutes
- Country: United States
- Language: English

Inside Information is a 1939 American mystery film directed by Charles Lamont. The film stars Dick Foran, Harry Carey, and June Lang. It was released on June 2, 1939. During production, the working title of the film was Metropolitan Police.

== Cast ==
- Dick Foran as Danny Blake
- Harry Carey as Captain Bill Dugan
- June Lang as Kathleen Burke
- Mary Carlisle as Crystal
- Addison Richards as Banford, aka Max Stockton
- Joe Sawyer as Grazzi
- Grant Richards as Charles Bixby
- Selmer Jackson as Huxley
- Paul McVey as Crawford
- Frederick Burton as Commissioner Fenton

== Production ==
In 1937, Universal Pictures made a deal with Crime Club, who were published of whodunnits. Over the next few years Universal released several mystery films in the series. The film was developed under the title Metropolitan Police.

Inside Information was based on an unpublished novel "47th Precinct" by Burnet Hershey and Martin Mooney. Mooney was a real-life New York City crime reporter who went to prison for refusing to reveal his news sources.

== Release ==
Inside Information was distributed by Universal Pictures on June 2, 1939.
