= Fight for Freedom =

Song
- Published: 1941
- Songwriter(s): Harold Levey

Fight for Freedom is a song written in 1941 by Harold Levey and published by M. Witmark & Sons.
