= Henry the Ache =

- Directed by: Ray McCarey
- Written by: Burnet Hershey; H.O. Kusell
- Produced by: Monroe Shaff; Meyer Davis
- Starring: Bert Lahr; Shemp Howard
- Cinematography: Joseph Ruttenberg
- Music by: Johnny Burke (lyrics); Harold Spina (music)
- Distributed by: RKO Pictures
- Release date: January 26, 1934
- Running time: 20 minutes
- Country: United States
- Language: English

Henry the Ache is a black-and-white short film burlesque of the 1933 film The Private Life of Henry VIII starring Bert Lahr and Shemp Howard. The comedy was filmed at Van Beuren Studios and released by RKO Radio Pictures on January 26, 1934.

== Cast ==
- Bert Lahr ... King Henry VIII
- Janet Reade ... Catherine Howard
- Monte Collins ... Thomas Culpeper
- Shemp Howard ... Artie
- Leni Stengel ... Anne of Cleves
- The Girlfriend Trio ... Ladies in Waiting
