= Bubbling Over (film) =

1934 film by Leigh Jason

- Directed by: Leigh Jason
- Written by: Burnet Hershey (writer)
- Produced by: Meyer Davis (associate producer); Monroe Shaff (producer)
- Starring: See below
- Cinematography: Joseph Ruttenberg
- Distributed by: RKO Radio Pictures
- Release date: 1934
- Running time: 20 minutes (USA)
- Country: United States
- Language: English

Bubbling Over is a 1934 American musical comedy short film directed by Leigh Jason. The film has been described as including various negative stereotypes.

== Plot ==
Ethel Peabody lives in a Harlem apartment with her lazy husband Samson and Samson's freeloading relatives who leave all the housework to Ethel without raising a finger. They also make very specific demands from what they want to eat for dinner to how they want their rooms arranged. Fed up with the constant demands and favours, Ethel throws them out. Later, a scheming occupant of the building reads Samson's mail and poses as a clairvoyant predicting the events of the letter: the arrival of Samson's "rich" Uncle Presbee for dinner. However, Uncle Presbee turns out not to be rich but instead is a penniless lunatic (imagining himself as The Emperor Jones) as well as a pickpocket. He steals the chicken dinner and the guests watches. Everyone is shocked when they find out that the items are mysteriously disappearing. Ethel asks Swami to use his crystal ball to see who is responsible for the missing items but the crystal ball also disappears. Swami improvises a replacement ball by using a glass fish bowl over the candle atop the table. The lights are dimmed and the group sings the spiritual hymn "I Can See St. Peter" in an attempt to create an image in the crystal ball. Unbeknownst to them, Uncle Presbee slips out of the room unnoticed with all the guests clothes, including Swami's outfit in which he disguises himself. Two apartment staff outside the room investigate the commotion. They then notice Uncle Presbee in the getup with all the stolen items, such as the chicken and forcibly escort him out. The lights in the dining room are then switched back on, revealing everyone's clothes having been stolen.

== Cast ==
- Ethel Waters as Ethel Peabody
- The Southernaires as Samson's relatives:
  - Homer Smith – First Tenor
  - Lowell Peters – Second Tenor
  - Jay Stone Toney – Baritone
  - William W. Edmonson (or Edmunson) – Bass and Narrator
- Hamtree Harrington as Samson/Presbee Peabody
- Frank L. Wilson as Swami River, the "clairvoyant"

== Soundtrack ==
- Ethel Waters - "Taking Your Time"
- Southernaires - "Hang Your Hat in a Harlem Flat"
- Ethel Waters - "Darkies Never Dream"
- Southernaires and Ethel Waters - "Company's Coming Tonight"
- Cast - "I Can See St. Peter" (traditional spiritual hymn)
