= Walter B. Pitkin =

American author and university professor

- Born: Walter Boughton Pitkin; February 6, 1878; Ypsilanti, Michigan, U.S.
- Died: January 25, 1953 (aged 74); Palo Alto, California, U.S.
- Occupation: Philosopher
- Spouse(s): Mary Gray; Katherine B. Johnson

Academic background
- Education: University of Michigan

Walter Boughton Pitkin (February 6, 1878 – January 25, 1953) was an American author and university professor. He taught at Columbia University for 38 years, and he authored more than 30 books, including the 1932 best-selling book, Life Begins at Forty.

== Biography ==
Pitkin was born on February 6, 1878, in Ypsilanti, Michigan. He graduated from the University of Michigan in 1900, and he attended the Hartford Seminary before studying in Europe at the Sorbonne University, the Ludwig-Maximilians-Universität München, and the Friedrich Wilhelm University of Berlin.

Pitkin and his wife Mary Gray had five sons: Richard G., John G., David B., Robert B., and Walter. The elder Pitkin later married Katherine B. Johnson. They resided in Los Altos, California. Pitkin died on January 25, 1953, in Palo Alto, California, at age 74.

== Career ==
Pitkin was a lecturer in philosophy and psychology at Columbia University (1905–09), and professor in the Columbia University School of Journalism (1912–43).

Pitkin authored more than 30 books over the course of his career, including Life Begins at Forty (New York, Whittlesey house, McGraw-Hill, 1932) and The Psychology of Happiness. His A Short Introduction to the History of Human Stupidity was translated into fifteen languages. Pitkin was a member of the New Realism school in philosophy, writing on its relation to biology.

== Works ==
- Must We Fight Japan? (1921)
- How To Write Stories (1923)
- The Art Of Rapid Reading (1929)
- The Psychology Of Happiness (1929)
- A Short Introduction To The History Of Human Stupidity (1932)
- Life Begins At Forty (1932)
- Dealers in Death (1932) - a documentary film that he served as technical advisor for
- More Power To You! (1933)
- Let's Get What We Want! (1935)
- Capitalism Carries On (1935)
- Making Good Before Forty (1939)
- On My Own (1944)
- The Best Years: How to Enjoy Retirement (1946)

== See also ==
- American philosophy
- List of American philosophers
