= Harold Levey =

Harold Levey (17 June 1894, New York City – 18 June 1967, New York City) was an American composer, lyricist, arranger, orchestrator, clarinetist, and conductor. He is best remembered for composing the scores to several Broadway musicals in the 1920s, and for creating music for Warner Bros. during the early years of sound films.

== Life and career ==
Harold Albert Levey was born into a Jewish-American family on 17 June 1894 in New York City. A child prodigy, he was trained in his youth as a clarinetist at the National Conservatory of Music of America. He began his professional career at the age of 13 as a clarinetist in the New York Symphony Orchestra under conductor Walter Damrosch. He later studied composing and conducting with Victor Herbert.

At the age of 19 Levey became band leader of the Brighton Beach Band. He worked as a conductor of radio orchestras, and as a conductor and composer of music for Warner Brothers in the early years of sound films. Some of the films he scored included The Girl in the Glass Cage (1929) and The Royal Box (1929). He served as music director for Armstrong's Theatre of Today; a radio program active from 1941-1954. He wrote the theme song for the 1963 television series The Dakotas.

As a composer and arranger, Levey is best known for his contributions to Broadway musicals during the 1920s. He wrote the music for Lady Billy (1920–1921, Liberty Theatre), The Clinging Vine (1922–1923, Knickerbocker Theatre), The Magic Ring (1923, Liberty Theatre), The Magnolia Lady (1924–1925, Shubert Theatre), The Greenwich Village Follies of 1925 (1925–1926, Chanin's 46th Street Theatre; also lyricist), Rainbow Rose (1926, Forrest Theatre; also lyricist), and Lovely Lady (1927–1928, Sam H. Harris Theatre).

Levy died of a heart attack at the age of 73 in New York City on 18 June 1967.
