= Life Begins at Forty =

Book by Walter B. Pitkin

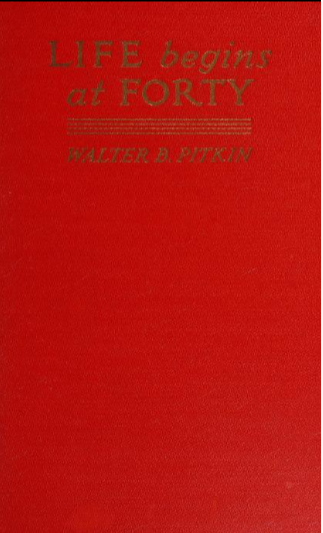
- Author: Walter B. Pitkin
- Publication date: 1932

Life Begins at Forty is a 1932 American self-help book by Walter B. Pitkin. Written during a time of rapid increase in life expectancy (at the time of its publication American life expectancy at birth was around 60 and climbing fast, from being only at age 40 fifty years before), it was very popular and influential. It was the #1 bestselling non-fiction book in the United States in 1933, and #2 in 1934, according to Publishers Weekly.

Although Pitkin did not necessarily coin the phrase "life begins at forty", the success of his book entered it into general circulation, such that after 1932 it became an American catchphrase for the remainder of the twentieth century and into the twenty-first (it is the title of a 1935 Will Rogers movie, a 1937 song sung by Sophie Tucker, an unrecorded 1980 John Lennon song, two television series (in 1978 in the UK and 2003 in Hong Kong), and several novels and other books).

More an extended essay and exhortation than a detailed self-help book in the modern sense, the general thrust of the book is that, given the current conditions of the world, one could look forward to many years of fulfilling and happy existence after age 40, provided that one maintained the proper positive attitude.
