= Freedom Fighters =

A freedom fighter is a person engaged in a resistance movement against what they believe to be an oppressive and illegitimate government.

Freedom Fighter(s) may also refer to:

== Media ==
=== Music ===
- "Freedom Fighters", a song by P.O.D. from their album Payable on Death
- "Freedom Fighters", a song by Two Steps From Hell from their albums Legend and Invincible, and used as a remix on their album SkyWorld
- "Freedom Fighters" (song), from The Music's 2004 album Welcome to the North
- "Freedom Fighters" (Miyavi song), a 2005 single by Japanese musician Miyavi
- "Freedom Fighter" a song by Rainbow on their 1981 album Difficult to Cure
- "Freedom Fighter" a song by Creed on their 2001 album Weathered

=== Television ===
- Freedom Fighter, Lee Hoe-young, a 2010 South Korean television series
- Freedom Fighters: The Ray, a 2017 animated web series included in the Arrowverse

=== Video games ===
- Freedom Fighters!, a 1982 video game released for the Magnavox Odyssey².
- Freedom Fighter (video game), a 1984 laserdisc arcade game
- Freedom Fighters (video game), a 2003 video game developed by IO Interactive

=== Other media ===
- Freedom Fighters (comics), a number of fictional superhero teams in comic books published by DC Comics, and two comics series featuring these teams
- Freedom Fighters (role-playing game), a 1986 military game
- Freedom Fighters (Marvel Cinematic Universe)
- Freedomfighters or Libertarias (film), a 1996 movie written and directed by Vicente Aranda

== Groups ==
- The Freedom Fighters, a professional wrestling tag team later known as The Blade Runners
- Cambodian Freedom Fighters, a political and paramilitary organization, active since 1989
- Economic Freedom Fighters, a South African political party, active since 2013
- Uganda Freedom Fighters, a rebel group active in 1986

== Other uses ==
- Indian freedom fighters, activists in the Indian independence movement who receive a pension from the Indian Government
- F-5 Freedom Fighter (or Tiger II), a low cost entry level supersonic fighter aircraft
- Freedom Fighters and Rehabilitation Division, a division of the Ministry of Home Affairs, India
- Paradise/Freedom Fighters, a football club based in Punta Gorda, Belize

== See also ==
- Freedom Fight (film), a 2022 Indian film
