= Kean (play) =

1836 play by Alexandre Dumas

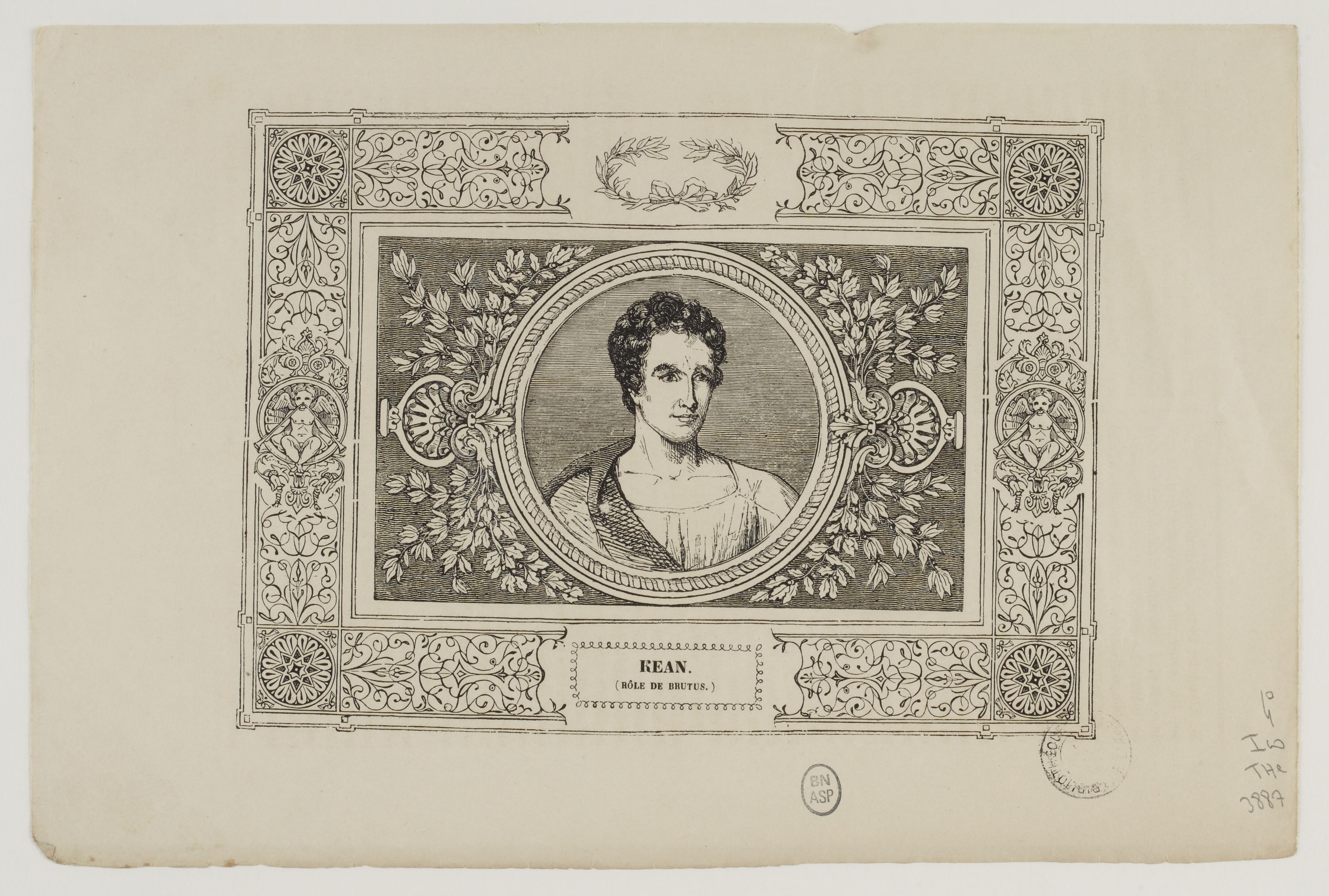
Print of Frédérick Lemaître as Edmund Kean, performing the role of Brutus, in the original production of Kean at the Théâtre des Variétés (August 31, 1836)

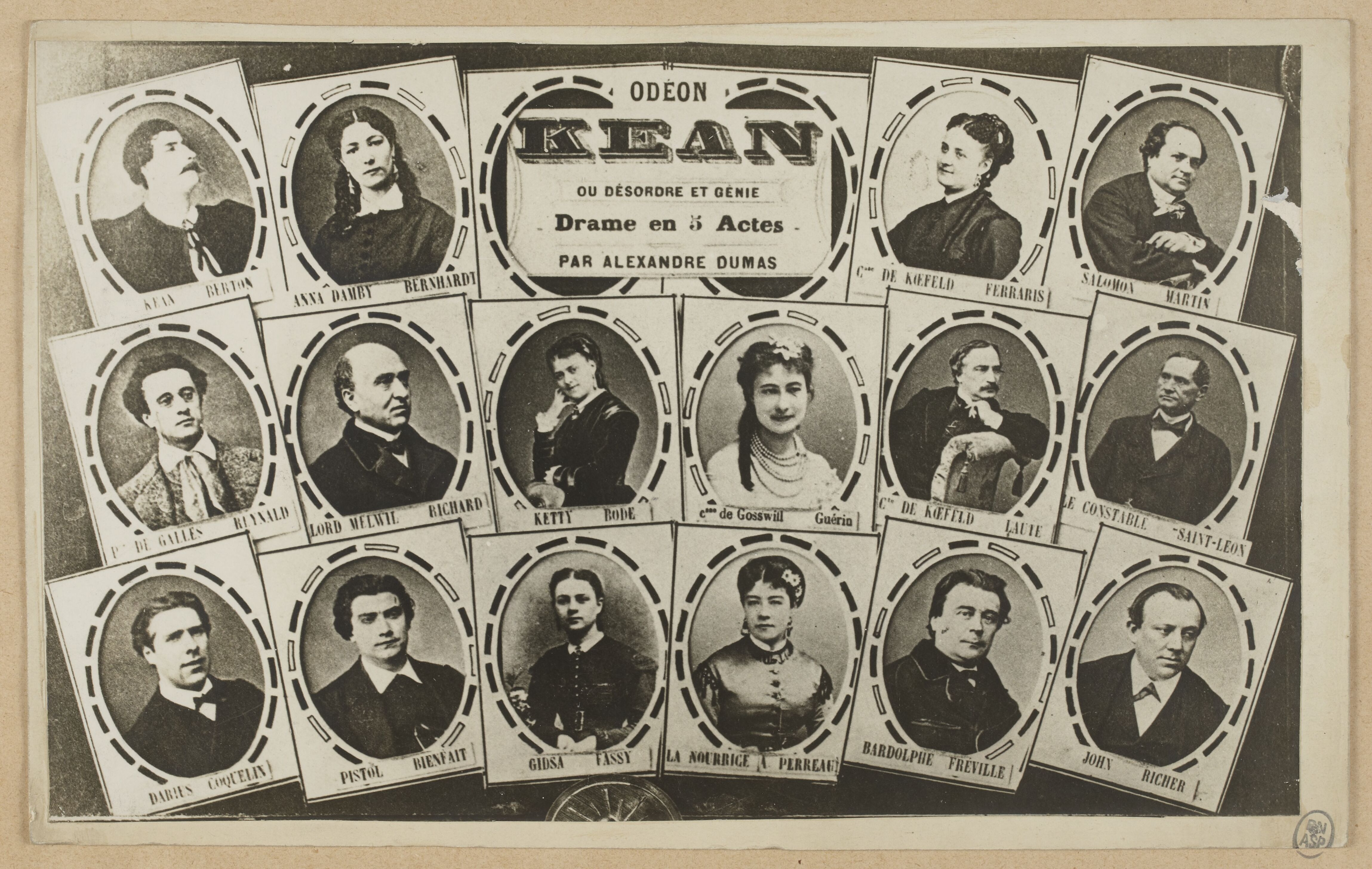
Sarah Bernhardt and other cast of the 1868 production of Kean at the Odéon-Théâtre de l'Europe

Kean, ou Désordre et génie is an 1836 play by the French writer Alexandre Dumas.

It is based on the life of the British stage actor Edmund Kean.

It premiered at the Théâtre des Variétés with Frédérick Lemaître in the title role.

Jean-Paul Sartre made his own version of play in 1954.

== Adaptations ==
It has been adapted into films several times including

- Kean, a 1921 silent German film
- A Stage Romance, a 1922 American film
- Kean, a 1924 silent French film
- Kean, a 1940 Italian film
- Kean, a 1956 Italian film

A 1961 stage musical Kean was also based on the work.

== Bibliography ==
- Goble, Alan. The Complete Index to Literary Sources in Film. Walter de Gruyter, 1999.
