= Sandrich =

Sandrich is a surname. Notable people with the surname include:

- Jay Sandrich (1932–2021), American television director, son of Mark
- Mark Sandrich (1900–1945), American film director, writer, and producer
