= Abram Edelman =

Abram Edelman may refer to:

- Abram M. Edelman, American architect
- Abram Wolf Edelman, Polish-born American rabbi
