= Remick Building =

Building in Los Angeles, California

- U.S. Historic district – Contributing property
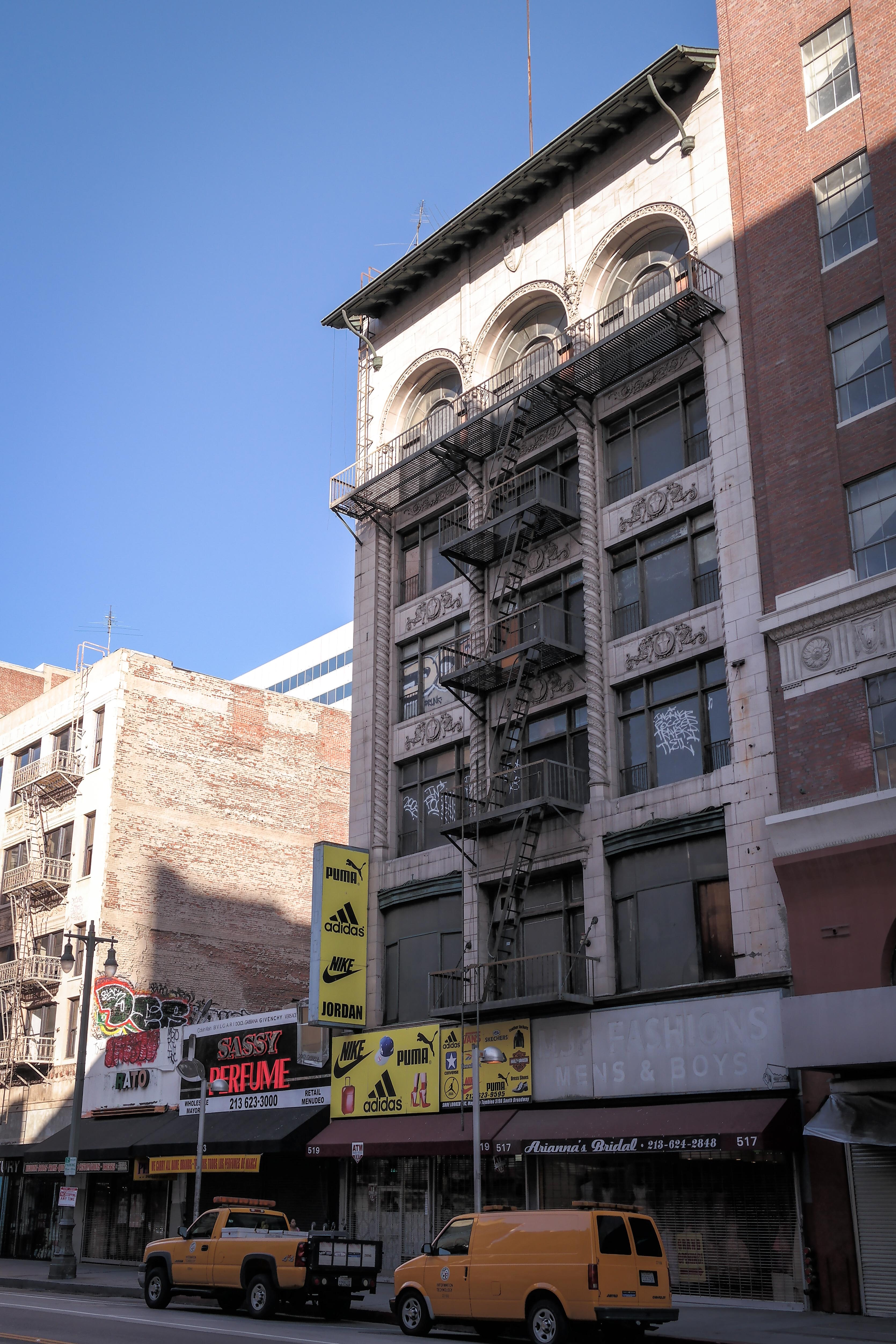
- The building in 2014

- Location within the Los Angeles metropolitan area
- Location: 517-519 S. Broadway, Los Angeles, California
- Coordinates: 34°02′52″N 118°15′05″W
- Built: 1902
- Architect: Abram M. Edelman
- Part of: Broadway Theater and Commercial District (ID79000484)
- Designated CP: May 9, 1979

Remick Building is a historic six-story building located at 517-519 S. Broadway in the Jewelry District and Broadway Theater District in the historic core of downtown Los Angeles.

== History ==
Remick Building was designed by Abram M. Edelman and built in 1902.

In 1979, the Broadway Theater and Commercial District was added to the National Register of Historic Places, with Remick Building listed as a contributing property in the district.

== Architecture and design ==
Remick Building is made of brick and features a decorative facade with twisting columns between arched windows.

== See also ==
- List of contributing properties in the Broadway Theater and Commercial District
