= Breed Street Shul =

Former Orthodox synagogue in Los Angeles, California

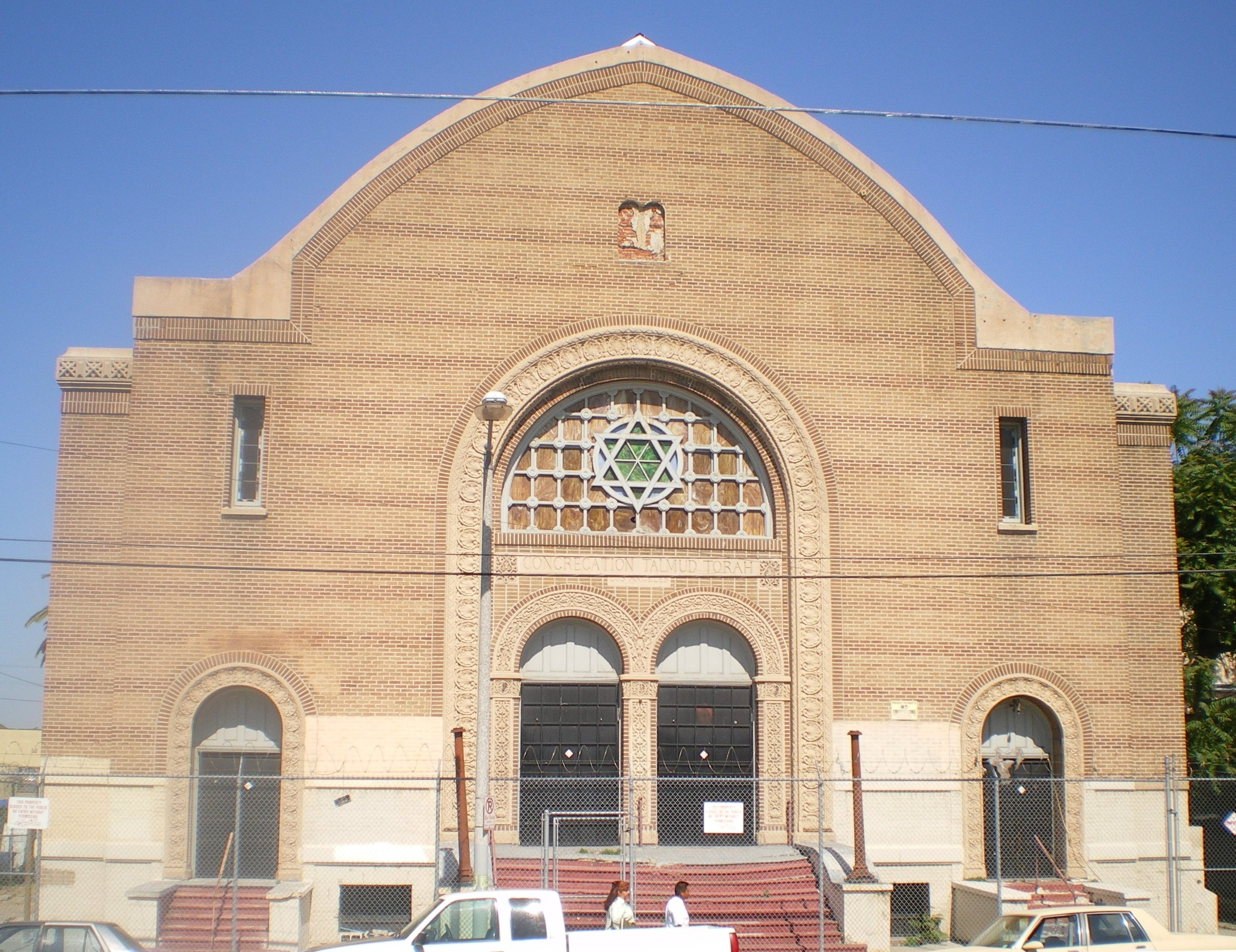
- The former Breed Street Shul, in 2008

- Location in Central Los Angeles

Religion
- Affiliation: Orthodox Judaism (1904–1996)
- Ecclesiastical or organisational status: Synagogue (1904 – 1980s)
- Status: Closed (mid-1980s); abandoned

Location
- Location: 247 North Breed Street, Boyle Heights, Los Angeles, California
- Country: United States
- Coordinates: 34°2′48″N 118°12′31″W

Architecture
- Architect: Abram M. Edelman
- Type: Synagogue
- Style: Byzantine Revival; Late 19th and 20th Century Revivals
- Established: 1904 (as a congregation)
- Completed: c. 1908 (Breed and First); 1915 (#1 N. Breed St); 1923 (#2 N. Breed St)
- Congregation Talmud Torah of Los Angeles
- U.S. National Register of Historic Places
- Los Angeles Historic-Cultural Monument
- NRHP reference No.: 01001192
- LAHCM No.: 359

Significant dates
- Added to NRHP: November 4, 2001
- Designated LAHCM: 1988

Breed Street Shul, also known as Congregation Talmud Torah of Los Angeles or Breed Street Synagogue, is a former Orthodox Jewish synagogue in the Boyle Heights section of Los Angeles, California, in the United States. It was the largest Orthodox synagogue west of Chicago from 1915 to 1951, and is listed in the National Register of Historic Places.

== Early history ==
Congregation Talmud Torah started in 1904, using rented quarters in downtown Los Angeles, at 114 Rose Street. It was started primarily as a Hebrew school ("Talmud Torah" is typically used to mean a supplemental afternoon religious school, though it was also used as a synagogue).

Within a few years, the immigrant population moved, concentrating in Boyle Heights. Several Jews purchased a house at Breed and First, and started using it as a shul. By 1914, the Rose Street location was nonviable, for lack of a quorum (minyan), and the membership merged with the new Breed Street group. In 1915, they purchased a lot two blocks north, and commissioned a new wood-framed building on the present site. It became known as the "Breed Street Shul." The original shul on the site was designed by O.M. Warner and constructed by Bornstein & Cohn.

Enrollment grew, and by 1918, a second structure was needed on the lot. By 1923, there were 110 students enrolled.

The Jewish population grew from a few hundred in 1910, to 1,842 in 1920, to more than 10,000 in 1930.

== Construction of the existing structure ==
As the size of the congregation grew, a new synagogue was built, designed by the architectural firm of Edelman and Barnett. The original wood structure was moved to the back of the lot to make room for the new brick structure which opened in 1923. The new synagogue was built from unreinforced masonry with veneer brick and cast stone embellishments on the facade. The façade includes alternating bands of dichromatic brickwork, "dense prickly foliage carving", other organic motifs, and Stars of David in bas-relief cast stone detail.

=== Role in the Boyle Heights community ===
The Boyle Heights section of Los Angeles, located east of downtown, was home to the city's most populous Jewish community from 1910 to 1950. The area around Breed Street Shul became a center for the Jewish community. The business district on Brooklyn Avenue (renamed Cesar Chavez Avenue in 1995) just north of the Shul was the location of many kosher butchers, bakeries, delis, bookstores and other shops catering to the Jewish community. The Breed Street block where the Shul was located also became home of the Los Angeles Jewish Academy (now part of Yavneh Academy) and Mount Sinai Clinic (a forerunner of Cedars-Sinai Medical Center).

In 1945, Rabbi Osher Zilberstein of Breed Street Shul opened the city's first Jewish parochial elementary school. When Israel was established as an independent nation in 1948, Breed Street Shul was the site of a solemn ceremony in which the new flag of Israel was flown for the first time in Los Angeles.

=== Dispersal of Boyle Heights Jewish community ===
In the years after World War II, the Jewish community in Boyle Heights dispersed, moving to areas such as the West Fairfax District, Beverlywood, and Encino. Rabbi Zilberstein remained at Breed Street Shul until his death in 1973. Many families, including those of Jewish Veterans of WWII, went east across the L.A. River to the San Gabriel Valley.

=== Vacancy and deterioration ===
The main brick building was vacated in the mid-1980s due to seismic retrofit requirements. Services were moved to the original wooden structure at the rear of the lot for several years. By 1996, services ceased at Breed Street Shul, and the buildings have been vacant since that time.

== Historic designation and restoration ==
In 1988, the building was designated as a City of Los Angeles Historic-Cultural Monument. The building fell into disrepair in the 1990s, and the City of Los Angeles foreclosed on the property after recording an assessment for barricading and protection. In 1998, Hillary Clinton visited the Shul as part of her Save America's Treasures campaign. In July 2000, the City quitclaimed the property to Breed Street Shul Project, Inc., a subsidiary of the Jewish Historical Society of Southern California. In 2021, the State of California awarded a $14.9 million grant to the Breed Street Shul Project, Inc to complete the restoration and reuse of the historic Breed Street Shul building as a county museum, educational and cultural center.

It was listed on the National Register of Historic Places in 2001.

== Former leadership ==
=== Former rabbis ===
Solomon Michael Neches (1921–1935)

Jerusalem-born Rabbi Solomon Michael Neches' was the first rabbi of the synagogue originally named Congregation Talmud Torah. Rabbi Neches advocated for Orthodox education for the community's Jewish children. He was instrumental in California's (first) Kosher Law. The name of the shul (Congregation Talmud Torah) made it clear that a Yeshiva/day school would have to await his successor. Neches also is recognized for having begun the Los Angeles-based Western Jewish Institute, and initially led it. He was succeeded as rabbi of the Breed Street shul by Rabbi Osher Zilberstein.

Osher Zilberstein (1935–1973)

Osher Zilberstein, a noted Torah scholar, was a tenth generation rabbi from Mezritch, Ukraine. In 1935 he assumed the rabbinical position as the rabbi of the Breed Street Shul, also known by the name Talmud Torah Los Angeles. Rabbi Zilberstein was instrumental in the opening of an Orthodox day school, Yeshivas HaMaarav. He was buried at Home of Peace Cemetery in East Los Angeles, California. His Yartzeit is 14 Shvat (5733) and his father's name was Rabbi Yisroel Aharon Zilberstein. He was born in Ukraine, immigrated to Winnipeg, Canada in 1924, and moved to Los Angeles in 1935.

Rav Mordechai Aaron Ganzweig (1973–1996)

Son of Rabbi Osher Zilberstein's prized student Rabbi Yonah Ganzweig, succeeded Rabbi Zilberstein and maintained services in the Shul in the Orthodox fashion of the shul's founders and leaders until he was locked out by the City of Los Angeles's foreclosure on the lien they placed on the property after doing some minor repairs.

=== Former cantors ===
Cantor Israel Reich (1946–1953) was described as a "Cantor's Cantor" because he "helped train countless students, including his own three children, to become cantors."

== See also ==
- Los Angeles Historic-Cultural Monuments on the East and Northeast Sides
- List of Registered Historic Places in Los Angeles
- Hal Bernson, Los Angeles City Council member, 1979-2003
