= Smith Estate (Los Angeles) =

Historic house in California, United States

- U.S. National Register of Historic Places
- Los Angeles Historic-Cultural Monument
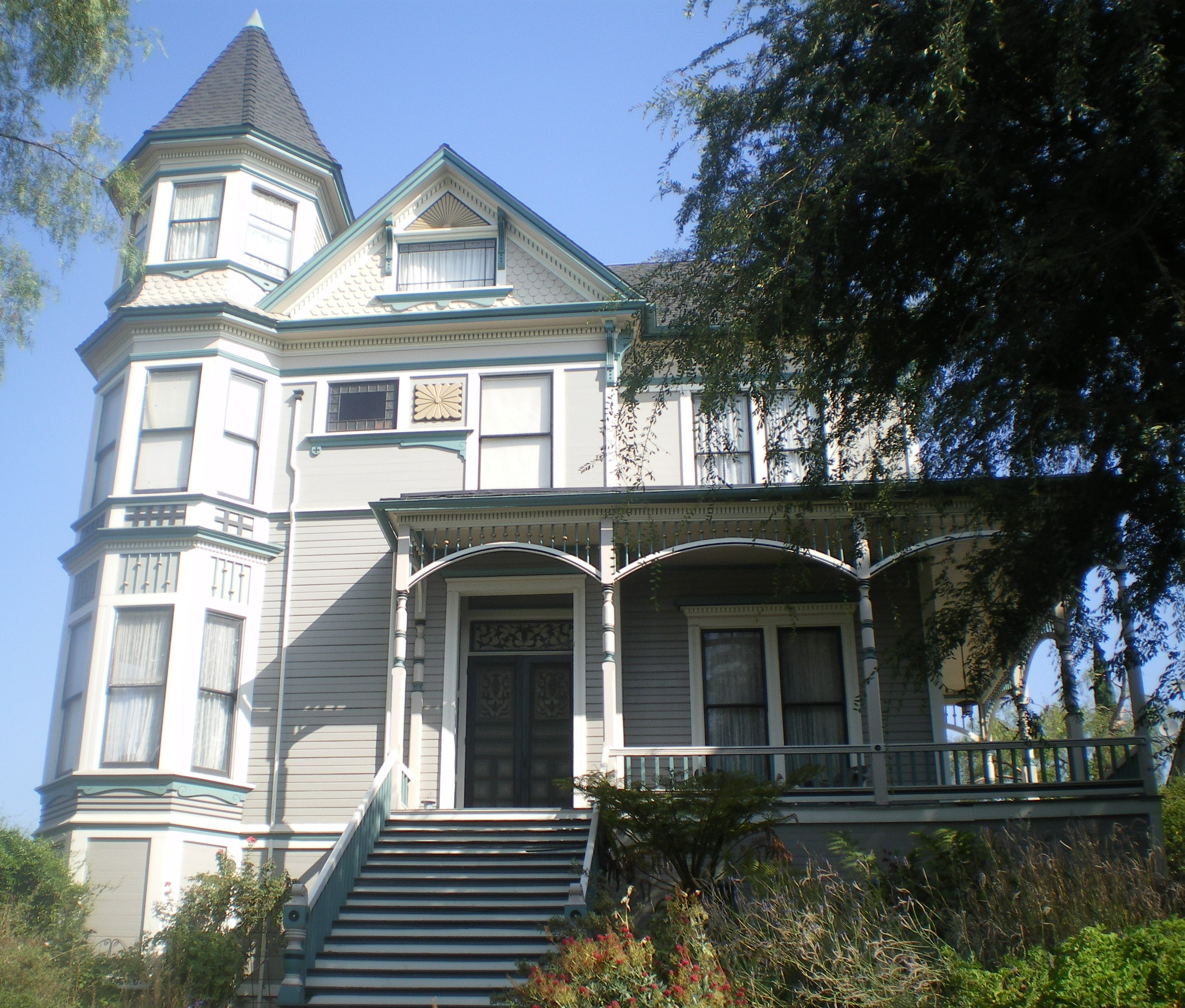
- Smith Estate, 2008

- Location within the Los Angeles metropolitan area Location within California Location within the United States
- Location: 5905 El Mio Dr., Highland Park, Los Angeles, California
- Coordinates: 34°6′53″N 118°11′31″W
- Built: 1887
- Architect: Abram M. Edelman
- Architectural style: Queen Anne-Victorian
- NRHP reference No.: 82000971
- LAHCM No.: 142

Significant dates
- Added to NRHP: October 29, 1982
- Designated LAHCM: April 16, 1975

The Smith Estate, also known as El Mio (Spanish: "mine" or "my place"), is a historic Victorian house perched on a hilltop in the Highland Park section of Los Angeles, California. The street, El Mio, is named after the house, which is how the Smith family referred to it during their residence. Built in 1887, the house was designed in the Queen Anne style by Abram M. Edelman. It has been the residence of a judge who wrote books on occultism, the head of the Los Angeles Railway, and a deputy mayor; and as a shooting location for the cult films Spider Baby, Silent Scream and Insidious: Chapter 2. It has also been declared a Los Angeles Historic-Cultural Monument and listed on the National Register of Historic Places.

== Occupants of the home ==
=== Judge Hatch ===
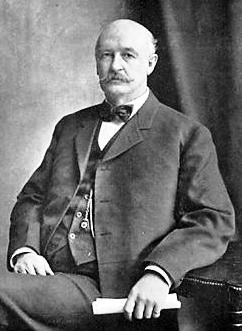
Original occupant Judge David Patterson Hatch

The house was built for Judge David Patterson Hatch (1846–1912). While the National Register indicates the house was built in 1890, a newspaper article from July 1887 reported that the house was already under construction:

"The frame of Judge Hatch's $10,000 residence, which is to overlook the beautiful Highland Park when completed, has now been raised and the owner is pressing the workmen to their greatest endeavors to get it completed."

Hatch became a judge in 1880 and gained fame presiding over the Perkins-Baldwin case—a breach of marriage promise case against Lucky Baldwin, a gold prospector who became one of the wealthiest men in Los Angeles and founded Santa Anita Park on his estate. The jury awarded the plaintiff $75,000—at the time "the highest amount of damages in the history of the bar of California." (The case was followed daily by the press, and a search of the Los Angeles Times archives reveals more than 50 articles reporting on the contents of Lucky Baldwin's love letters and every other detail of the case. Some of the more colorful and breathless headlines from the case are included below.) In 1886, Hatch left the bench and became the senior member of the Los Angeles law firm of Hatch, Lloyd & Hunt. Hatch also became known nationally as a writer on philosophy and the occult, with works including "Scientific Occultism", "The Twentieth Century Christ", "The Blood of the Gods", "Text Book of Christian Hermit Philosophers" and the novel "El Reschid" (one of a series of books written under "the Hindoo name of Karishka"). When he died in 1912, the Times called him "a remarkable man" who was "exceptionally versed in the deep philosophies of life" and who had "obtained a deep knowledge of universal laws, which, although natural to himself, appeared as mysticism to those who had not followed his great mental strides."

=== Smith family ===
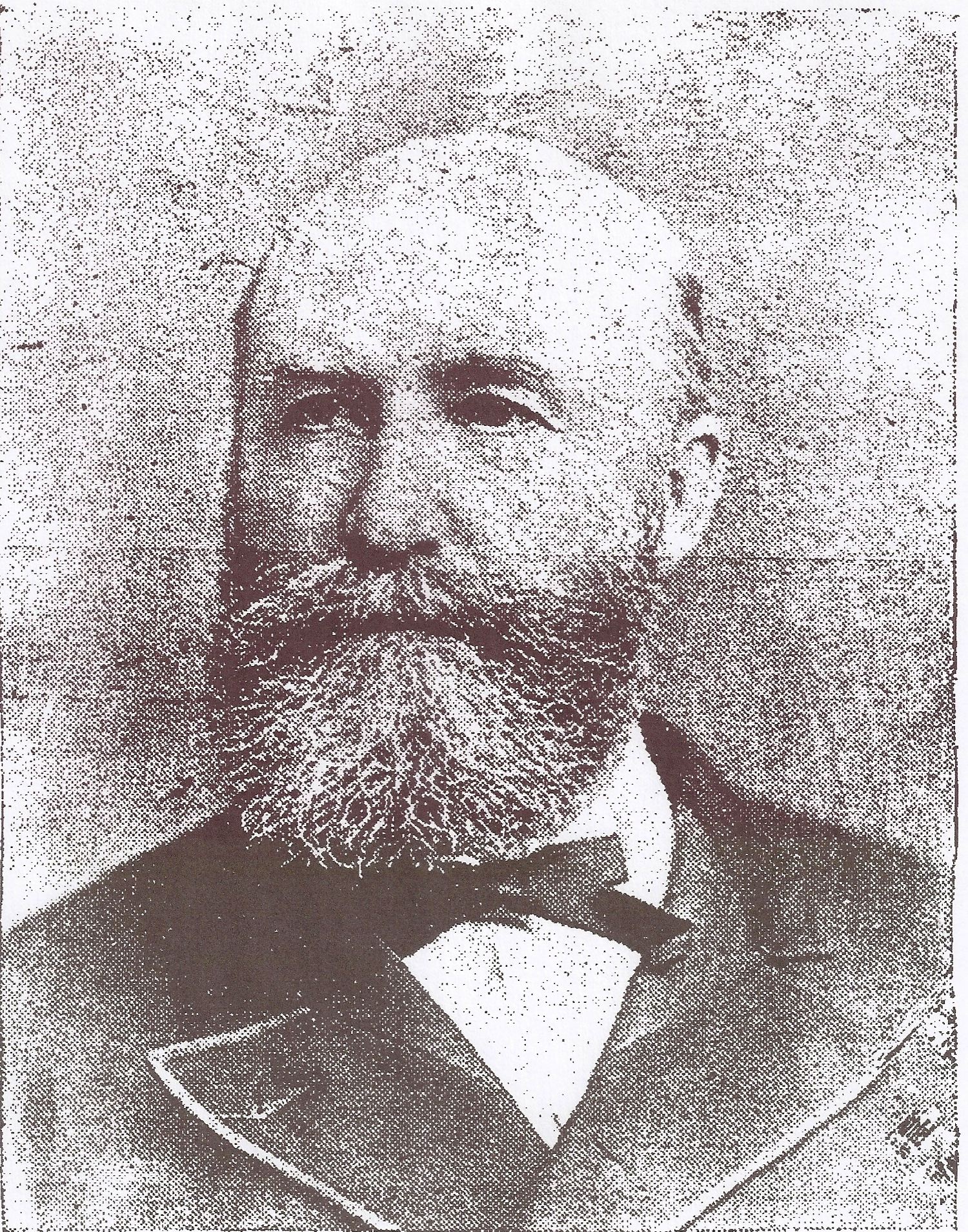
The family of railroad man C.W. Smith owned the house for more than 60 years.

Though Judge Hatch was the original occupant, the house was acquired by Charles Warren Smith in the mid or late 1890s and remained in the Smith family until the early 1960s. For this reason it became known as the Smith Estate. Charles Smith was a railroad man who was at various times the first vice president of the Atchison, Topeka and Santa Fe Railway, the receiver of the Atlantic and Pacific Railroad and the general manager of the Pasadena and Los Angeles Electric Railway Company. In 1900, Henry Huntington named Smith, described as "an old-time employe (sic) of the Southern Pacific, having been with the road in its early days," as the superintendent of the Los Angeles Railway's streetcar lines. At the time of his retirement, the Los Angeles Times reported: "Manager Smith has earned a rest, if any one has, from years of arduous toil as the manager of great transportation properties."

During the Smiths' occupancy, the home became known for its parties. In 1901, the Smiths held a Fourth of July party at the home, which the Los Angeles Times described as follows:

"From 8:30 until 12 o'clock dancing was enjoyed at the home of Misses Smith. The music room was decorated with pepper boughs and roses and streamers of red, white and blue ribbon hung from the center chandelier to the sides of the room. Punch was served on the side veranda, which was decorated in roses."

And in June 1904, Mrs. Smith hosted a Japanese tea at the house featuring Japanese music, tea served by Japanese girls, stereoscopic views of Japan, and an address by a woman who had lived 12 years in Japan. The tea was a fundraiser, and the admission was 25 cents. One long-time Highland Park resident in the 1930s recalled the Smith house as one of the first in the area: "There were few homes in our section of Highland Park then. The C.W. Smith house which pointed an architectural finger from its hill top, a beacon for lost souls who traveled out that far ... A few other dwellings there were, but these were the landmarks." The Smiths' son, Stanley Quay Smith, married Clara Maurer in 1911, and lived at the house until his death at age 72 in 1958. According to his obituary, he had lived at the family's landmark home since 1895.

=== Los Angeles Deputy Mayor Gage ===
Los Angeles Deputy Mayor Michael Gage bought the house in 1988 for $515,000. At the time, the Los Angeles Times noted that Gage was an ardent preservationist and he and his wife, Lacey, had both fallen in love with the home. The Times noted that the house, built on a hilltop with four bedrooms and maids' quarters, had a view of Gage's office at Los Angeles City Hall." Gage was credited in the late 1980s with reviving the political pulse of Mayor Tom Bradley's administration.

=== Current ownership ===
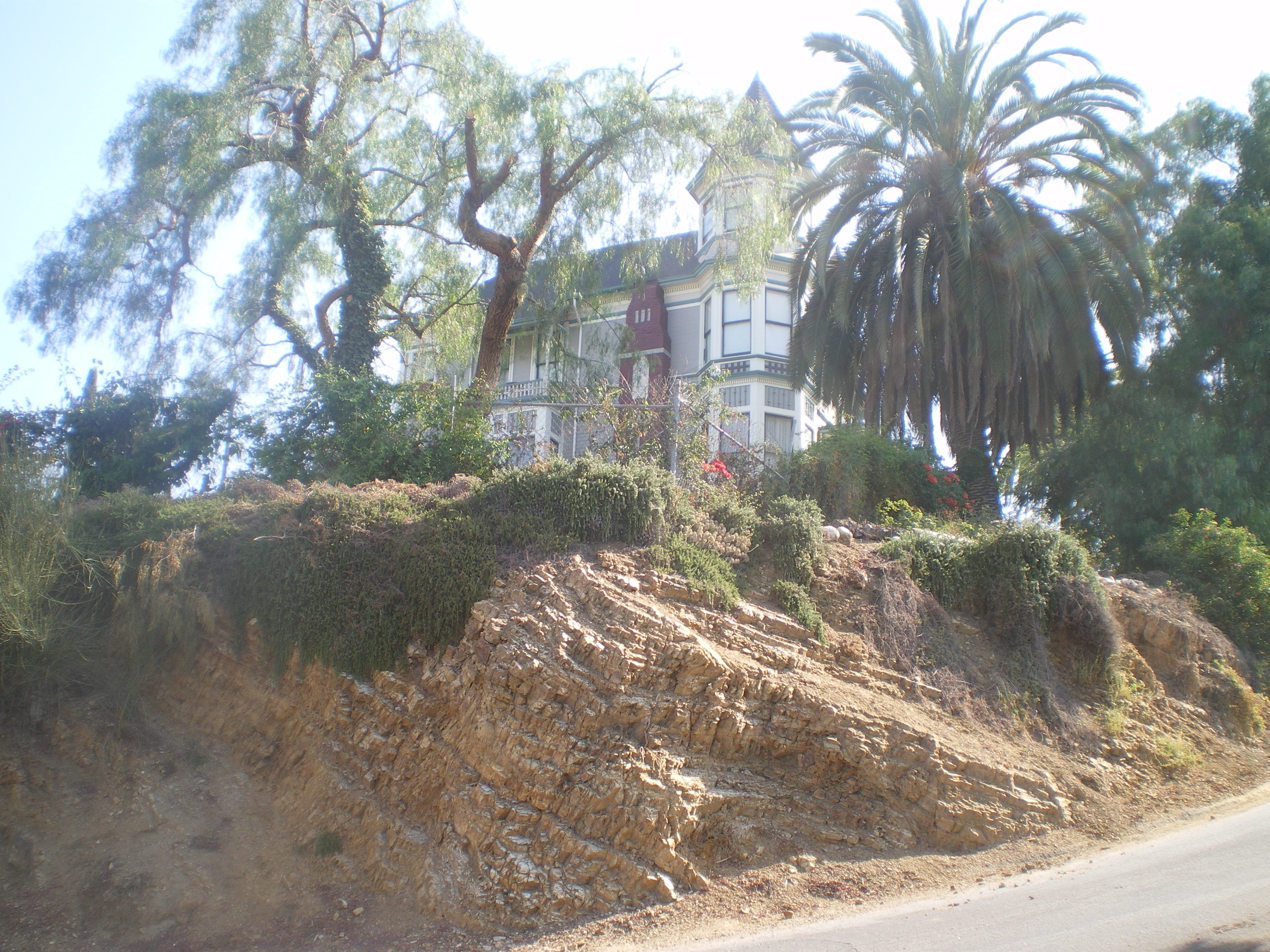
Smith Estate from the base of El Mio Street

As of 2008, the house had been owned for approximately eleven years by Tim and Mari Parker.

== On film ==
In 1964, Jack Hill shot the horror comedy cult film Spider Baby (also known as Attack of the Liver Eaters) at the Smith Estate. A short clip from the film showing a full view of the estate and the front porch can be viewed on YouTube.com. In 2007, writer/director Hill recalled: "We did a documentary for the DVD where I went back to the house and showed where we shot this, where we shot that. Today, of course, it's been remodeled and people are living there and it's probably worth a couple of million."

Silent Scream was also shot at this location. The exterior of the house can be viewed in the opening ten minutes of the film.

Insidious: Chapter 2 was shot extensively at El Mio, and the home is featured - inside and out - as one of the film's major locations.

== Historic designation ==
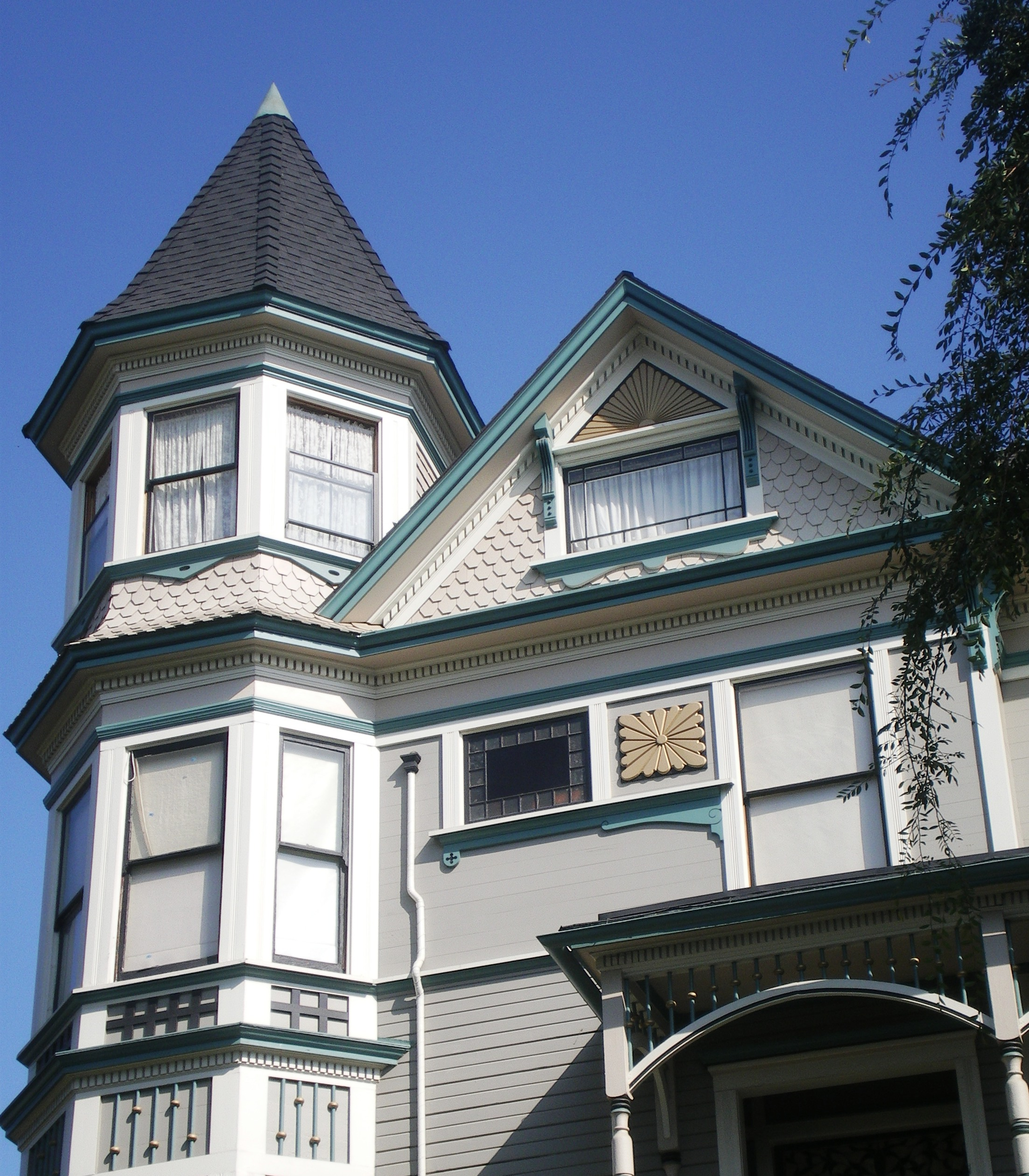
Front facade

The house was declared a Historic Cultural Monument (HCM #142) by the Los Angeles Cultural Heritage Commission in 1975, and was listed on the National Register of Historic Places in 1982.

== See also ==
- Los Angeles Historic-Cultural Monuments on the East and Northeast Sides
- List of Registered Historic Places in Los Angeles
