= Ruth Harriet Louise =

American photographer (1903–1940)

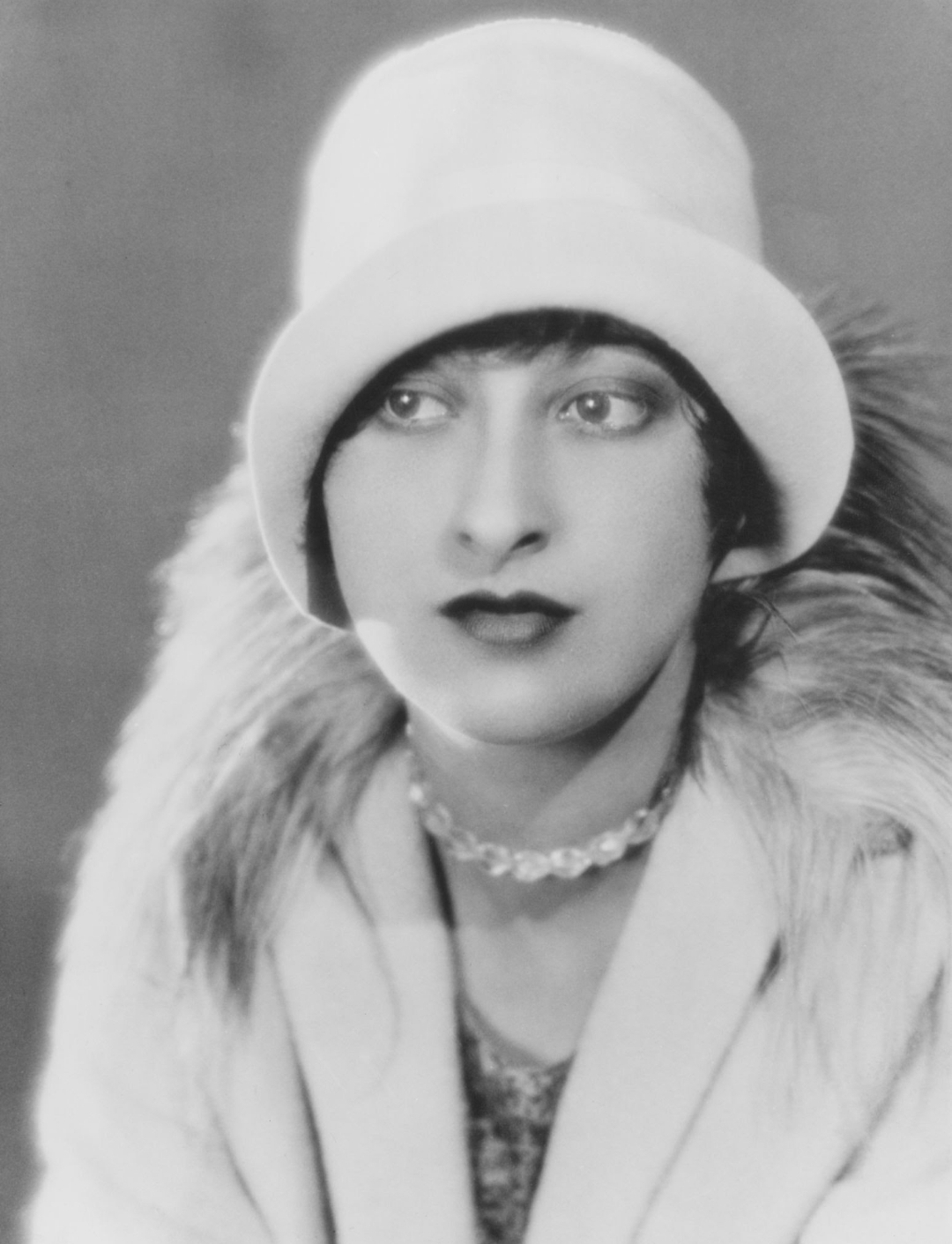
- Ruth Harriet Louise (self-portrait)
- Born: Ruth Goldstein; January 13, 1903; New York City, U.S.
- Died: October 12, 1940 (aged 37); Los Angeles, California, U.S.
- Resting place: Home of Peace Cemetery
- Known for: Photography
- Spouse: Leigh Jason (m. 1930)
- Children: 1
- Relatives: Mark Sandrich (brother); Jay Sandrich (nephew); Carmel Myers (cousin)

Ruth Harriet Louise (born Ruth Goldstein; January 13, 1903 – October 12, 1940) was an American photographer. She was the first woman photographer active in Hollywood, and she ran Metro-Goldwyn-Mayer's portrait studio from 1925 to 1930.

== Early life and career ==
Ruth Harriet Louise was born Ruth Goldstein in New York City and raised in New Brunswick, New Jersey. She was the daughter of Klara Jacobson Sandrich Goldstein, who was born in Rajec, Hungary (present-day Slovakia) and Jacob Goldstein, who was a rabbi originally from England. Her brother was director Mark Sandrich, and she was a cousin of silent film actress Carmel Myers.

Louise began working as a portrait photographer in 1922, working out of a music store down the block from the New Brunswick temple at which her father was a rabbi. Most of her photographs from this period are of family members and members of her father's temple congregation.

In 1925, she moved to Los Angeles and set up a small photo studio on Hollywood and Vine. Louise's first published Hollywood photo was of Vilma Banky in costume for Dark Angel, and appeared in Photoplay magazine in September 1925.

When Louise was hired by MGM as chief portrait photographer, she was twenty-two years old, and the only woman working as a portrait photographer for the Hollywood studios. In a career that lasted only five years, Louise photographed all the stars, contract players, and many of the hopefuls who passed through the studio's front gates, including Greta Garbo (Louise was one of only seven photographers permitted to make portraits of her), Lon Chaney, John Gilbert, Joan Crawford, Marion Davies, Anna May Wong, Nina Mae McKinney, and Norma Shearer. It is estimated she took more than 100,000 photos during her tenure at MGM. Today she is considered an equal with George Hurrell and other renowned glamour photographers of the era.

In addition to paying close attention to costume and setting for studio photographs, Louise also incorporated aspects of modernist movements such as Cubism, futurism, and German expressionism into her studio portraits.

Although during this time photographers would not get full recognition of their work, Ruth would stamp the back of each photograph that was printed with her full name. A female photographer in a highly dominated male industry, she made sure that her work was acknowledged.

== Personal life and death ==
Louise married writer and director Leigh Jason in 1927 at Temple B'nai B'rith, with William Wyler as Jason's best man. Although in 1930 her contract with MGM was not renewed and the position of chief portrait photographer went to George Hurrell, Louise continued working through 1932, and her last recorded photo session was with actress Anna Sten.

In 1932, she gave birth to a son, Leigh Jason Jr., who died in 1938 of leukemia when he was five years old. In 1938, her occupation was listed as "housewife" and she was registered as a Democrat. She died, along with her second son, in 1940 of complications from childbirth, and she was buried with her sons at Home of Peace Cemetery.
