= Virginia Dale =

American actress

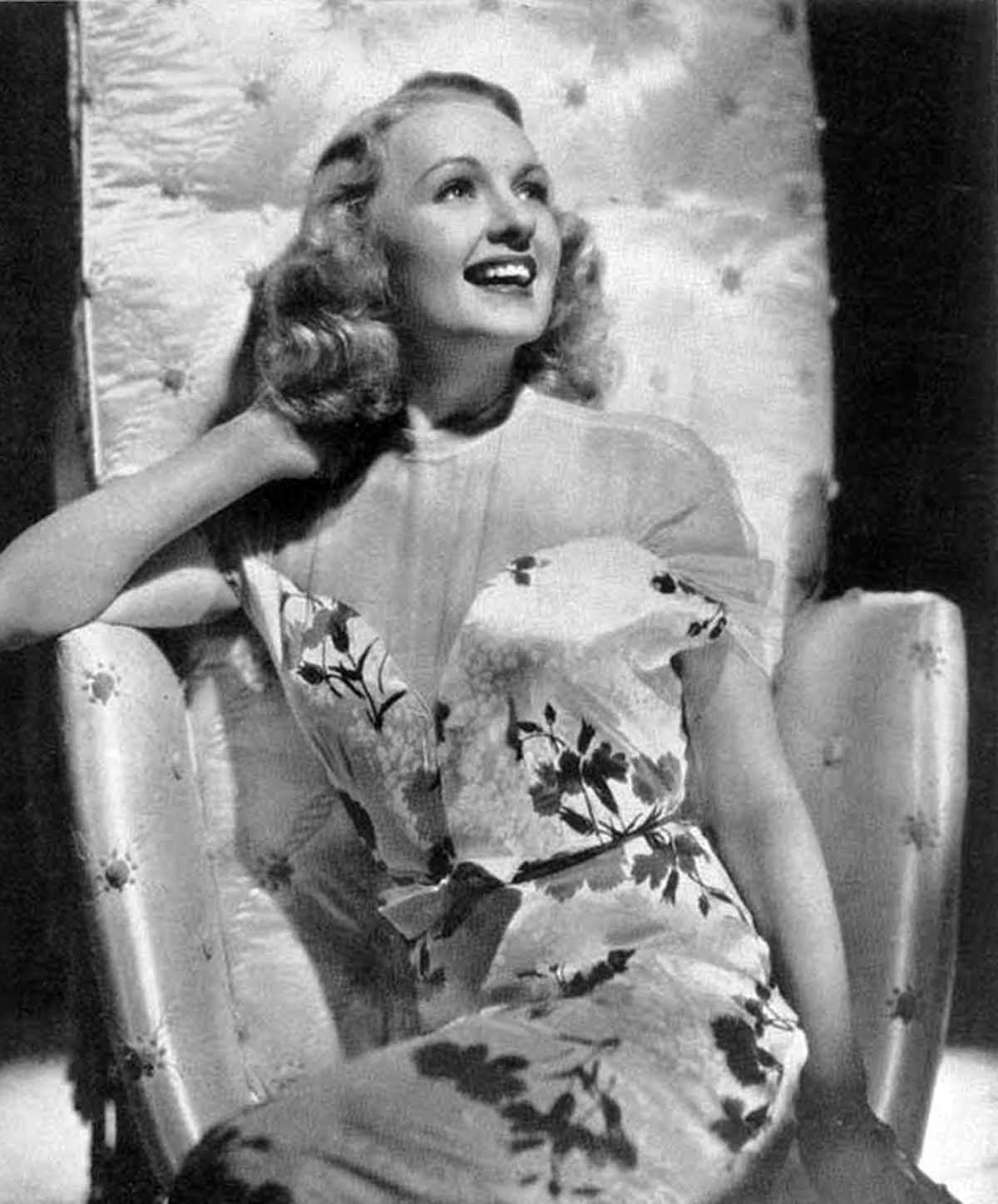
- Publicity photo, c.1939
- Born: Virginia Paxton; 1916 or 1917; North Carolina, U.S.
- Died: October 3, 1994 (aged 77); Burbank, California, U.S.
- Occupations: Actress, dancer
- Years active: 1938–1958, 1982–1987

Virginia Dale (born Virginia Paxton; 1916 or 1917 – October 3, 1994) was an American actress and dancer.

== Biography ==
Dale was born in North Carolina. She was the daughter of Lula Helms Paxton, and she graduated from Central High School in Charlotte.

Dale began learning toe dancing when she was 9 years old. When she was an adult, she recalled, "I slaved and slaved at it, hating every minute. I tried everything I could think of to get out of it." That exit occurred when blood poisoning in one of her feet required grafting lamb's skin over the top of the foot. The resulting reduction in the foot's ability to stretch ended her toe dancing.

When Dale was a teenager, Earl Carroll selected her as the winner of a beauty contest in Charlotte. That introduction to Carroll helped Dale and her sister, Frances, who danced as a team, to perform in New York City. Their engagements there included an eight-month stint at the Hollywood Restaurant. They also performed in other cities in the eastern United States. While they were in New York City, Dale was discovered by Darryl F. Zanuck who signed her to a contract with 20th Century Fox.

She appeared in a number of movies in the late 1930s and 1940s, including Holiday Inn (1942), in which she dances and sings with Fred Astaire and Bing Crosby, and she became particularly associated with musicals. In the 1950s, she worked mainly in television series such as The Adventures of Kit Carson (1951–1952), Highway Patrol (1957), and The Life and Legend of Wyatt Earp (1957–1958). She left the movie business in 1958, but returned to acting for a few films in the 1980s.

On Broadway, Dale performed in Him (1928) and The Final Balance (1928).

== Death ==
Dale died of complications of emphysema on October 3, 1994, in Burbank, California, aged 77.

== Filmography ==
Year	Title	Role	Notes
1938	No Time to Marry	Eleanor Winthrop	
1938	Start Cheering	Mabel	
1939	Idiot's Delight	Les Blondes - Francine	
1939	The Kid from Texas	'Okay' Kinney	
1939	Death of a Champion	Patsy Doyle	
1939	All Women Have Secrets	Jennifer Warwick	
1940	Parole Fixer	Enid Casserly	
1940	Buck Benny Rides Again	Virginia	
1940	The Quarterback	Kay Merrill	
1940	Dancing on a Dime	Dolly Stewart	
1940	Love Thy Neighbor	Virginia Astor	
1941	Las Vegas Nights	Patsy Grant	
1941	The Singing Hill	Jo Adams	
1941	Kiss the Boys Goodbye	Gwendolyn Abbott	
1941	World Premiere	Lee Morrisson	
1942	Holiday Inn	Lila Dixon	
1943	Headin' for God's Country	Laurie Lane	
1947	Fall Guy	Marie	
1947	The Hucksters	Kimberly Receptionist	
1947	Dragnet	Irene Trilling	
1947	Louisiana		
1948	Docks of New Orleans	Rene Blanchette	
1948	Strike It Rich	Mabel	
1950	Love That Brute	Maid	Uncredited
1951	Danger Zone	Claire Underwood	(1st Episode)
1974	That's Entertainment!	Herself	Documentary, Clip from 'Idiot's Delight', (archive footage)
