= Slipping Stitches =

Finnish hard rock/pop rock band

- Origin: Helsinki, Finland
- Genres: Hard rock, pop rock, glam rock
- Years active: 2003–Present
- Labels: GLAM Productions
- Members: Markus Lindqvist (aka Cashmire); Jacob Alexander (aka Dizzy); Samuli Väänänen
- Past members: Marty Stitch; Madison Pulse; Lexx Avenue; Toni Suominen; Michael Monroe (studio)
- Website: slippingstitches.com

Slipping Stitches was a hard rock/pop rock band from Helsinki, Finland.

== History ==
Slipping Stitches was founded in 2003. Under their previous name Peace of Mind, they recorded their first single No Privacy. It was recorded at Sonic Pump Studios in Helsinki, Finland in 2001. Michael Monroe of Hanoi Rocks fame produced the first two tracks, and contributed with both lyrics and background vocals. They changed their name to Slipping Stitches in the spring of 2003. In May 2004 they released their first album entitled Melody Cruise on GLAM productions. In 2005 vocalist Markus Lindqvist (aka Cashmire) announced that a major line-up change had happened, leaving himself as the only original member. The band toured in Finland and Italy with the new lineup during the years 2005–07. They also released a self-titled EP in 2007 to support the second Italian tour. Drummer Toni Suominen left the band and the band was fairly inactive for a few years. The band did some acoustic tours in the United States from 2009 to 2012. Most shows were on the east coast in the New York City area but also at The Viper Room in West Hollywood, LA. The band started working on their second album (Heroes) in 2011, which took more than one year to record. Award-winning producer Jukka Backlund (Sunrise Avenue) was chosen to produce the album. Their album titled Heroes was released in early 2015. The first single from the album is a track called "Walk Away from Me".

== Members ==
=== Current members ===
- Markus Lindqvist - Vocals, guitars (2003–Present)
- Jacob Alexander - Bass, vocals (2005–Present)
- Samuli Väänänen - Guitars, vocals (2005–Present)

=== Former members ===
- Marty Stitch - Guitars, keyboards, vocals (2003–2005)
- Madison Pulse - Bass (2003–2005)
- Lexx Avenue - Drums (2003–2005)
- Toni Suominen - Drums, vocals (2005–2008) (session drummer on the album Heroes)

== Discography ==
=== Albums ===
Slipping Stitches

- Melody Cruise (2004)
- Heroes (2015)

=== EPs ===
Slipping Stitches

- Slipping Stitches (2007)

=== Singles ===
Peace of Mind

- No Privacy (2001)

Slipping Stitches

- Walk Away from Me (2013)

== See also ==
- Music of Finland

== Sources ==
- "Slippingstitches.com". The band - History. Archived from the original on 2018-11-27.
