= Mark Sandrich =

American film producer (1900–1945)

- Born: Mark Rex Goldstein; October 26, 1900; New York City, U.S.
- Died: March 4, 1945 (aged 44); Los Angeles, California, U.S.
- Resting place: Home of Peace Cemetery
- Occupations: Director, producer, screenwriter
- Years active: 1927–1945
- Spouse: Freda W.
- Children: 2, including Jay
- Relatives: Ruth Harriet Louise (sister); Carmel Myers (cousin)

Mark Sandrich (born Mark Rex Goldstein; October 26, 1900 – March 4, 1945) was an American film director, writer, and producer.

== Early life ==
Sandrich was born in New York City on October 26, 1900 into a Jewish family. His sister was Ruth Harriet Louise.

He was an engineering student at Columbia University when he accidentally fell into the film business. While visiting a friend on a film set, he saw that the director had a problem setting up a shot; Sandrich offered his advice, and it worked. He entered the movie business in the prop department.

== Career ==
=== Shorts director ===
Sandrich became a director in 1927, making comedy shorts. His first feature was Runaway Girls, in 1928. In an exciting time in the film business with the arrival of sound, he briefly returned to shorts. In 1933, he directed the Academy Award-winning short So This Is Harris!.

=== Feature films ===
Sandrich returned to directing features with Melody Cruise (1933). He followed it with Cupid in the Rough (1933) and two starring the team of Wheeler & Woolsey, Hips, Hips, Hooray! (1933) and Cockeyed Cavaliers (1934).

=== Astaire and Rogers ===
Sandrich did some uncredited second unit work with Flying Down to Rio (1933), a musical featuring Fred Astaire and Ginger Rogers. In 1934, Sandrich was given the job of directing the first proper Astaire–Rogers musical, The Gay Divorcee, which proved a tremendous success.

The following year, he directed Top Hat (1935), another Fred Astaire and Ginger Rogers musical. He continued working with the team on Follow the Fleet (1936).

After directing Katharine Hepburn in A Woman Rebels (1936) he returned to Astaire and Rogers for Shall We Dance (1937), and Carefree (1938).

=== Paramount ===
In 1939, Sandrich left RKO for Paramount, which offered him a chance to be not only a director, but a producer as well.

Sandrich's first film for Paramount was just as director: the Jack Benny vehicle Man About Town (1939). He then turned producer as well as director and made two more with Benny, Buck Benny Rides Again (1940) and Love Thy Neighbor (1940). He also did the romantic comedy Skylark (1941), starring Claudette Colbert and Ray Milland.

While all of these films made profits for the studio, Holiday Inn (1942), starring Fred Astaire and Bing Crosby, with music by Irving Berlin, is most remembered today. Holiday Inn introduced the song "White Christmas" performed by Crosby. "White Christmas" remains the best-selling single of all time.

Sandrich also produced and directed a dramatic war film, So Proudly We Hail!, a 1943 box-office success that starred Claudette Colbert, Paulette Goddard, and Veronica Lake. It was extremely popular and featured a pair of performers – Adrian Booth (billed as "Lorna Gray" in this picture) and George Reeves – whom Sandrich had intended to bring to stardom after the war. Sandrich's last completed films also were war-related -- I Love a Soldier (1944) and Here Come the Waves (1944), both with Sonny Tufts.

== Personal life and death ==
His sons, Mark Sandrich Jr. and Jay Sandrich, went on to careers as directors in film and television.

Mark Sandrich supported Thomas Dewey in the 1944 United States presidential election.

In 1945, he was in pre-production on a follow-up to Holiday Inn called Blue Skies, starring Bing Crosby and featuring Irving Berlin's music. At the same time, Sandrich was serving as president of the Directors Guild.

Insisting that he could complete all of his assignments, and feeling pressure to be an involved and loving family man, Sandrich died suddenly of a heart attack at the age of 44. At the time of his death, Sandrich was considered to be one of the most trusted and influential directors in Hollywood. His interment was at Home of Peace Cemetery.

== Select credits ==
=== Shorts ===
- Jerry the Giant (1926) – director
- Napoleon, Jr. (1926) – director
- Big Business (1926) – director
- First Prize (1927) – director
- Hot Soup (1927) – director
- Hold That Bear (1927) – director
- Careless Hubby (1927) – director
- A Midsummer Night's Steam (1927) – director
- Night Owls (1927) – director
- The Movie Hound (1927) – director
- Brave Cowards (1927) – director
- Monty of the Mounted (1927) – director
- Hold Fast (1927) – director
- Shooting Wild (1927) – director
- Some Scout (1927) – director
- Hello Sailor (1927) – director
- High Strung (1928) – director
- Sword Points (1928) – director
- A Lady Lion (1928) – director
- A Cow's Husband (1928) – director
- Two Gun Ginsberg (1929) – director
- Gunboat Ginsberg (1930) – writer, director
- General Ginsberg (1930) – writer, director
- Hot Bridge (1930) – director
- Barnum Was Wrong (1930) – writer, director
- Off to Peoria (1930) – writer, director
- Who's Got the Body? (1930) – writer, director
- A Peep on the Deep (1930) – director
- Society Goes Spaghetti (1930) – writer, director
- Razored in Old Kentucky (1930) – director
- Moonlight and Monkey Business (1930) – writer, director
- Aunt's in the Pants (1930) – writer, director
- Trader Ginsberg (1930) – writer, director
- Talking Turkey (1931) – writer, director
- The Wife o' Riley (1931) – writer, director
- The County Seat (1931) – writer, director
- Trouble from Abroad (1931) – writer, director
- The Way of All Fish (1931) – writer, director
- Cowslips (1931) – writer, director
- False Roomers (1931) – writer, director
- Strife of the Party (1931) – writer, director
- Scratch-As-Catch-Can (1931) – writer, director
- A Melon-Drama (1931) – writer, director
- Sightseeing in New York (1931) – writer, director
- Many a Sip (1931) – writer, director
- A Slip at the Switch (1932) – director
- Ex-Rooster (1932) – writer, director
- The Millionaire Cat (1932) – director
- The Iceman's Ball (1932) – writer, director
- Jitters the Butler (1932) – writer, director
- Thru Thin and Thicket, or Who's Zoo in Africa (1933) – director
- Private Wives (1933) – writer, director
- Hokus Focus (1933) – writer, director
- The Druggist's Dilemma (1933) – writer, director
- The Gay Nighties (1933) – writer, director
- So This Is Harris (1933) – writer, director

=== Feature films ===
- Runaway Girls (1928) – director
- The Talk of Hollywood (1929) – writer, director
- Hold 'Em Jail (1932) – writer
- Scratch-As-Catch-Can (1932) – director
- Melody Cruise (1933) – writer, director
- Aggie Appleby, Maker of Men (1933) – director
- Hips, Hips, Hooray! (1934) – director
- The Gay Divorcee (1934) – director
- Top Hat (1935) – director
- Follow the Fleet (1936) – director
- A Woman Rebels (1936) – director
- Shall We Dance (1937) – director
- Carefree (1938) – director
- Man About Town (1939) – director
- Buck Benny Rides Again (1940) – director, producer
- Love Thy Neighbor (1940) – director, producer
- Skylark (1941) – director, producer
- Holiday Inn (1942) – director, producer
- So Proudly We Hail! (1943) – director, producer
- I Love a Soldier (1944) – director, producer
- Here Come the Waves (1944) – director, producer
