= Silent Scream (1979 film) =

1979 horror film

The Silent Scream
- Theatrical poster, stylized as Silent Scream
- Directed by: Denny Harris
- Written by: Ken Wheat; Jim Wheat; Wallace E. Bennett; Denny Harris
- Produced by: Ken Wheat; Jim Wheat
- Starring: Rebecca Balding; Barbara Steele; Cameron Mitchell; Yvonne De Carlo
- Cinematography: Michael D. Murphy; David Shore
- Edited by: Edward Salier
- Music by: Roger Kellaway
- Production company: Speculator Productions
- Distributed by: American Cinema Releasing
- Release date: November 15, 1979
- Running time: 87 minutes
- Country: United States
- Language: English
- Budget: $600,000
- Box office: $7.9 million

The Silent Scream (Note: The film was popularly marketed under the truncated title, Silent Scream, but its official title per the film's title card is The Silent Scream. It is copyrighted with the Library of Congress under this title.) is a 1979 (Note: Some sources characterize The Silent Scream as a 1980 film, including film studies writers Scott Aaron Stine and John Kenneth Muir, both of whom include it in their respective books focused on 1980s horror cinema. This is technically incorrect, however, as the film was given a limited release in November 1979, which subsequently expanded in 1980. It is classed by several archival institutions, such as the National Library of Congress, as a 1979 feature film.) American slasher film directed by Denny Harris, and starring Rebecca Balding, Cameron Mitchell, Barbara Steele and Yvonne De Carlo. The film follows a college student who finds rooming in a hilltop boarding house where a homicidal killer is on the loose.

Principal photography of The Silent Scream began in the fall of 1977, and was completed within a month. However, after Harris was unsatisfied with the rough cut, he chose to rewrite and recast several key roles in the film. The roles of Diane McBain and Ric Mancini, who were originally cast in the film as police officers, were recast with Mitchell and Avery Schreiber, respectively. Reshoots took place in June 1978, and the finished film retained only around fifteen percent of the initial shoot's footage.

The Silent Scream was given a limited theatrical release in November 1979 through American Cinema Releasing. After it performed favorably at the box office, its release was expanded in January 1980. It went on to become one of the most financially successful independent horror films of the 1970s, grossing $7.9 million at the box office. The film was met with mixed reviews from critics, with some finding it derivative of other horror films, while others praised it for its performances, cinematography, and visual style.

== Plot ==
Scotty Parker, a college student in Southern California, is seeking a room for the fall semester at the last-minute. She is directed to a boarding house run by the standoffish Mrs. Engels; a Victorian mansion on a cliffside overlooking the Pacific Ocean. Mrs. Engels lives in the house along with her teenage son, Mason, and several other college students, including Doris, Peter, and Jack. The four students become friends, and decide to go on a double date together. Afterward, Doris and Peter walk along the beach near the house. Peter, drunk, makes unwanted advances on her, and Doris leaves him on the beach. He falls unconscious, and is awakened by an unseen assailant who stabs him to death with a butcher knife.

Lieutenant McGiver and Sergeant Manny Rusin are assigned to investigate Peter's murder, and Lt. McGiver grows suspicious of Mrs. Engels and her son. One afternoon, Scotty and Doris meet in the basement laundry room, where Doris tells her she is planning on moving after what happened to Peter. Scotty returns to her room with Jack, and the two begin to have sex. Meanwhile, in the basement, a woman bursts out of a hidden door, stabbing Doris numerous times in the head and chest.

The woman flees through the secret door, which opens to a hidden staircase that travels along the house's air ducts, eventually leading to a room located off the main attic space. Scotty goes downstairs to get her laundry, where she finds a pool of blood, and Doris gone. She discovers the secret door, and ascends the staircase. At the top, she finds a narrow hallway with a door at the end. She attempts to open it, and is attacked by the woman, who pulls her inside. The commotion alarms Mrs. Engels, who enters the room from an access door in the attic and intervenes.

Mrs. Engels reveals that the woman, Victoria, is her daughter. Mason chastises his mother for having taken in boarders at the house, knowing of Victoria's violent outbursts. Mrs. Engels then reveals to Mason that Victoria is in fact his mother: After a suicide attempt, she gave birth to him, but was left mute and homicidal after undergoing a botched lobotomy at a psychiatric hospital. Meanwhile, Jack searches for Scotty throughout the house, but is unable to find her. He is confronted by Mason downstairs, who knocks him unconscious.

At the police station, Sgt. Rusin uncovers a file on Victoria's past and determines she has been living in the Engels home after being taken out of the psychiatric hospital; he and Lt. McGiver promptly leave to go to the boarding house. Meanwhile, with Scotty bound and gagged in a closet, Mrs. Engels attempts to console the childlike Victoria. Mason obtains a gun from his bedroom and returns to the attic, attempting to kill Victoria. In a struggle, he inadvertently shoots Mrs. Engels through the chest, killing her. With his back turned, Victoria approaches Mason. He turns around, and she stares at him blankly, moving closer with a knife. Cornered against a window, he shoots her, and then shoots himself in the head.

Scotty manages to free herself, but finds Victoria has survived the gunshot; she attacks Scotty with the knife. Jack awakens just as Lt. McGiver and Sgt. Rusin arrive at the house. They enter the attic and find Victoria collapsed with a knife in her stomach. Jack consoles Scotty as Victoria dies on the floor.

== Cast ==
- Rebecca Balding as Scotty Parker
- Cameron Mitchell as Lt. Sandy McGiver
- Avery Schreiber as Sgt. Manny Rusin
- Barbara Steele as Victoria Engels
  - Tina Tyler as Victoria, age 16
- Steve Doubet as Jack Towne
- Yvonne De Carlo as Mrs. Engels
- Brad Rearden as Mason Engels
  - Jason Zahler as Mason, age 3
- John Widelock as Peter Ranson
- Juli Andelman as Doris Pritchard
- Jack Stryker as Police Chief
- Thelma Pelish as Housing Lady

== Production ==
=== Filming ===
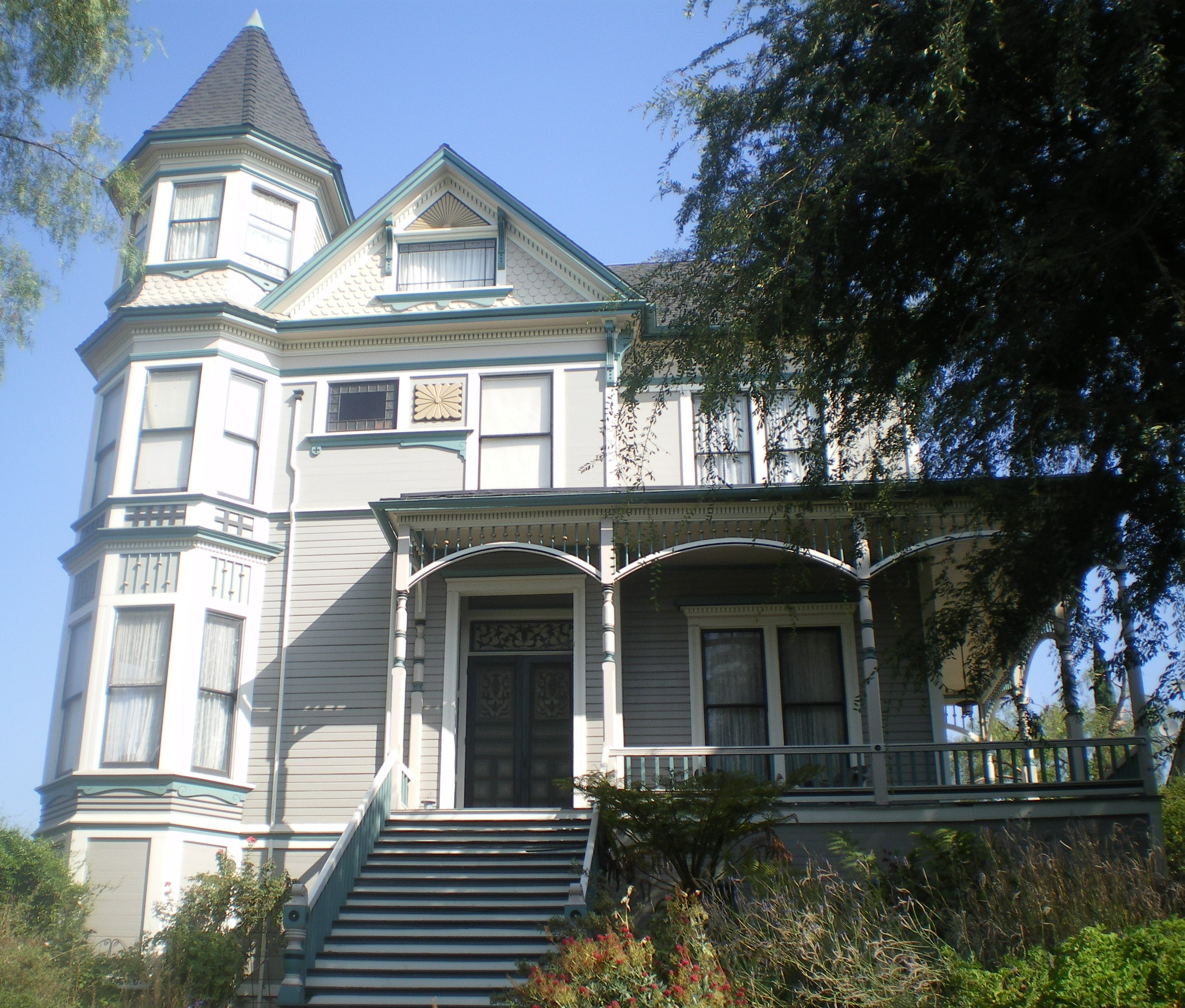
The Smith Estate in Los Angeles served as a shooting location

Principal photography began on September 30, 1977 in the Los Angeles area on a budget of $600,000. Actress Diane McBain was cast as a police detective when the film began shooting in the Smith Estate, Highland Park, Los Angeles, Eagle Rock, Los Angeles and Occidental College with the film written and directed by Denny Harris. Ric Mancini was also cast as a police detective. The film was completed within 23 days, reportedly under budget. After Harris was displeased with the rough cut, he made the decision to rewrite and reshoot the majority of the film.

==== Re-shoots ====
Harris began reshooting the film in June 1978 with a partly-new cast. McBain's role was recast to Cameron Mitchell, with Yvonne De Carlo, Brad Reardon, and Avery Schreiber—the latter replacing Ric Mancini—were also added as new cast members. Only 15% of the original footage remained in the film. McBain was told that her character of a female police detective was "unbelievable".

== Release ==
The Silent Scream had a sneak preview in Oceanside, California on September 21, 1979. The film was released theatrically by American Cinema Releasing; it had a limited regional release, opening in several California cities—including Fresno, Hanford, and Tulare—on November 15, 1979. It opened in Honolulu, Hawaii on November 19, 1979.

Because the film performed well during its initial release, American Cinema Releasing expanded it to 131 theaters throughout California in January 1980. The film had its Los Angeles opening on January 18, 1980.

=== Home media ===
The film was released on VHS by Media Home Entertainment in 1982 and later by Video Treasures in 1988.

The film was released by Scorpion Releasing on DVD in 2009 and on Blu-ray in 2017. On July 22, 2025, Kino Lorber issued a 4K UHD Blu-ray release of the film.

== Reception ==
=== Box office ===
During the first week of its January 1980 release, the film grossed $1.67 million. According to the chart book by Leonidas Fragias, it was a number one film in cinemas for the weekend of 6 February 1980.

=== Critical response ===
Tom Buckley of The New York Times panned the film, writing: "The only frightening thing about Silent Scream is that there are people who will pay $5 to see it... Everything about the production is repulsively amateurish, and it is saddening to see performers like Yvonne De Carlo and Cameron Mitchell reduced to appearing in it." The Philadelphia Inquirer's Desmond Ryan praised the camerawork as "adept" but ultimately deemed the film "crude and ineffective for the apparent reason that Harris is so absorbed in technique—in how a grasping hand or wielded knife is to be filmed—that he has ignored just about every other aspect of making a film." Hal Lipper of the Dayton Daily News deemed the film a "carbon copy of Halloween," though he praised Balding as a "competent actress" and added that the film's finale "looks as though it came from a Charles Manson therapy session." Robert Masulo, a critic for The Sacramento Bee, praised the film's cinematography, but felt the performances were "without inspiration," and the screenplay "overflowing with clichés." Joe Baltake of the Philadelphia Daily News similarly felt the film was derivative, but praised the performances and cinematography, which he described as "admirable, considering the shoestring status of the production, lending grace to the gory proceedings." Clyde Gilmour of the Toronto Star called the film a "cliché-strewn horror melodrama" with a "ludicrous script."

Linda Gross of the Los Angeles Times was more favorable in her assessment, writing that "despite indulgences in improbable plotting and predictable gore, The Silent Scream is a scary, stylish Grand Guignol horror movie," adding that director Harris "rarely miscalculates his shocks, and his quiet moments are even better." The Boston Globe's Michael Blowen also gave the film a favorable review, summarizing: "In spite of its obvious flaws, Silent Scream is the best low-budget horror film since Halloween. If that sounds like damning with faint praise, so be it." Ted Mahar of The Oregonian also praised the film as "well-made," noting its strong performances and "rich visual look, with subdued colors and intelligent use of darkness and shadow," as well as noting its homages to Psycho (1960).

The film was used as an example of the "women in danger" genre in a special 1980 episode of Sneak Previews with Siskel and Ebert dedicated to criticising such releases, which were becoming a trend in the wake of John Carpenter's Halloween, as the slasher genre was starting to be codified. Two clips were played, the first of the heroine looking for a room in the guest house and the second of her about to be attacked by the killer. In the episode, Roger Ebert narrates the footage thusly: "This aggressive woman gets a room alright, but she also gets beaten, gagged, tied up in a closet and attacked with a knife." He used this as an example of how "the moment that a woman starts making decisions for herself in these movies, you can almost bet she's going to end up paying with her life, and horribly."

== Sources ==
- Donahue, Suzanne Mary (1987). American Film Distribution: The Changing Marketplace. Ann Arbor, Michigan: UMI Research Press. ISBN 978-0-835-71776-2.
- McBain, Diane; Michaud, Michael Gregg (2014). Famous Enough - A Hollywood Memoir. Duncan, Oklahoma: BearManor Media. ISBN 978-1-593-93576-4.
- Muir, John Kenneth (2010). Horror Films of the 1980s. Jefferson, North Carolina: McFarland. ISBN 978-0-786-45501-0.
- Nowell, Richard (2011). Blood Money: A History of the First Teen Slasher Film Cycle. New York City, New York: Continuum. ISBN 978-1-441-18850-2.
- Stine, Scott Aaron (2003). The Gorehound's Guide to Splatter Films of the 1980s. Jefferson, North Carolina: McFarland. ISBN 978-1-476-61132-7.
