= Follies Theater =

Former theater in Los Angeles, California

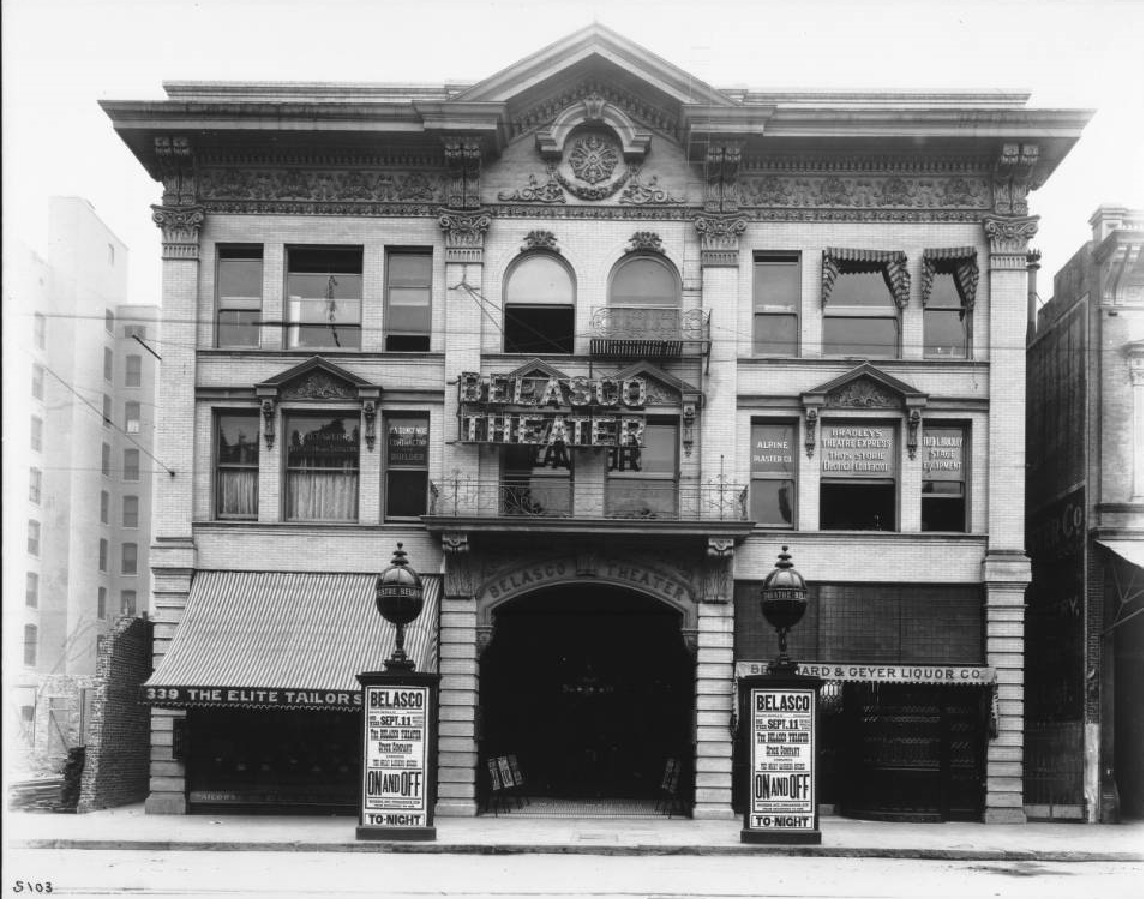
- The theater c. 1910
- Interactive map of Follies Theater
- Former names: Belasco Theater; Republic Theater
- Address: 337 South Main Street, Los Angeles
- Coordinates: 34.0490°N 118.2468°W
- Capacity: 1,200 later reduced to 900
- Type: live and occasional movie theater

Construction
- Built: 1904
- Opened: August 29, 1904
- Renovated: 1912, 1930s
- Demolished: May 1974
- Architects: Abram M. Edelman (1904); S. Charles Lee (1930s)

Follies Theater, previously Belasco Theater and Republic Theater, was a live and occasional movie theater located at 337 South Main Street in downtown Los Angeles.

== History ==
Follies Theater, originally Belasco Theater, was designed by Abram M. Edelman for David Belasco and his partner M.E. Mayer. Built as part of a three-story mixed-use building in 1904, the theater and the building it was in were both built in less than four months. The theater sat 1,200 and in 1907 was listed as one of the twenty largest theaters in Los Angeles. Its first showing was The Wife on August 29, 1904.

In 1912, the theater was renamed Republic Theater and began showing vaudeville and movies.

The theater was renamed Follies Theater in 1919, at which point it began hosting burlesque. Lillian Hunt ran shows here from 1944 to 1952, when she moved to the nearby Burbank Theater that was renamed New Follies. Lili St. Cyr worked at Follies Theater during Hunt's time here, and in 1952 she was paid $10,000 ($121,241 in 2025) per week to strip and bathe on stage. Shirley Jean Rickert worked in this theater as well.

The theater was demolished in May 1974.

== Design ==
The theater originally sat 1,200 and contained one balcony of "unusual size" and six boxes on either side of the structure. The theater had nine exits that opened to passageways directly to the street and could be exited in its entirety in ninety seconds. Sixteen dressing rooms accompanied the stage, twelve underneath and four on the stage floor. The stage itself was 70 feet (21 m) wide and 38 feet (12 m) in depth.

The theater's color scheme was green, ivory, and gold. The flooring featured a five-inch coating of asphaltum and the plastering was done with Hardin hard wall plaster. All interior decorations were fireproof.

The theater and lobby were heavily altered when they changed to Republic Theater in 1912. S. Charles Lee also remodeled the theater in the 1930s and at some point, the theater's seating capacity was reduced to 900.
