= Holiday Inn (film) =

1942 film by Mark Sandrich

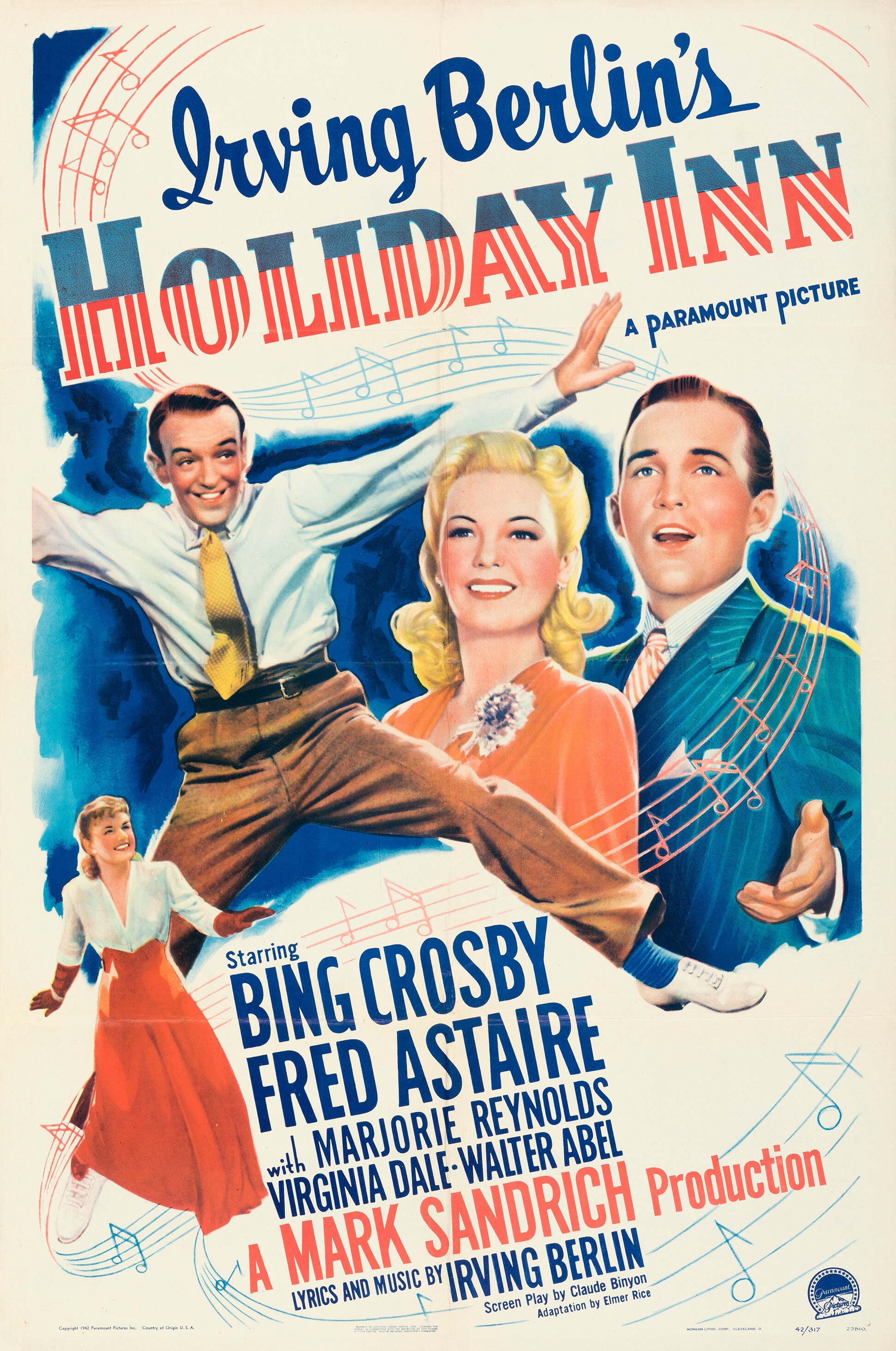
- Theatrical release poster
- Directed by: Mark Sandrich
- Screenplay by: Claude Binyon
- Adaptation by: Elmer Rice
- Story by: Irving Berlin
- Produced by: Mark Sandrich
- Starring: Bing Crosby; Fred Astaire; Marjorie Reynolds; Virginia Dale; Walter Abel
- Cinematography: David Abel
- Edited by: Ellsworth Hoagland
- Music by: Irving Berlin
- Production company: Paramount Pictures
- Distributed by: Paramount Pictures
- Release date: August 4, 1942
- Running time: 100 minutes
- Country: United States
- Language: English
- Box office: $3.75 million (US and Canada rentals)

Holiday Inn is a 1942 American Christmas musical comedy-drama film starring Bing Crosby and Fred Astaire, with Marjorie Reynolds, Virginia Dale, and Walter Abel. It was directed by Mark Sandrich with music by Irving Berlin. The composer wrote twelve songs specifically for the film, the best known being "White Christmas". The film features a complete reuse of the song "Easter Parade", written by Berlin for the 1933 Broadway revue As Thousands Cheer and used as a highlight of the 1948 film Easter Parade, starring Astaire and Judy Garland. The film's choreography was by Danny Dare.

The film received a 1943 Academy Award for Best Original Song (Berlin's "White Christmas"), as well as Academy Award nominations for Best Score (Robert Emmett Dolan) and Best Original Story (Irving Berlin).

== Plot ==
Jim Hardy, Ted Hanover, and Lila Dixon have a popular New York City song and dance act. On Christmas Eve, Jim prepares for his final performance before marrying Lila and retiring to a farm in Connecticut. Lila tells Jim she has fallen in love with the notorious charmer Ted instead; heartbroken, Jim bids them goodbye.

He tries to make a go of working the farm, but ends up in a sanatorium instead. The following Christmas Eve, Jim is back in New York City with plans to turn his farm into "Holiday Inn," an entertainment venue open only on holidays, to the amusement of Ted and his agent Danny Reed. In a flower shop, Danny is pitched by sales girl and aspiring performer Linda Mason; he steers her to Holiday Inn and Ted's club. Later that night, Linda and Jim accidentally meet at a performance by Ted and Lila. Jim pretends to own a rival club, while Linda postures as a celebrity friend of Ted's, only to flee when Ted and Lila approach.

On Christmas Day, Linda arrives at Holiday Inn and meets Jim, the pair immediately realizing their deception. Jim sings her his new song, "White Christmas".

On New Year's Eve, Holiday Inn opens to a packed house. Back in New York City, Ted learns that Lila is leaving him for a Texas millionaire. Drinking heavily, he arrives at Holiday Inn at midnight and literally stumbles into Linda. They dance and bring down the house, which believes it all to be a polished act. Danny arrives and is ecstatic that Ted has found a new partner, but in the morning, Ted does not remember Linda. Jim hides her, afraid Ted will steal her away.

On Lincoln's Birthday, Ted and Danny search for Linda, but Jim convinces Linda to play the minstrel show number "Abraham" in blackface together to foil them. While applying Linda's makeup, Jim asks her to stay there with him between holidays, which she interprets as a proposal. He affirms it but equivocates that only when he can afford to. Leaving empty-handed, Ted and Danny plan to return.

Rehearsing for Valentine's Day, Jim presents Linda with a new song, "Be Careful, It's My Heart". Ted arrives and launches into an impromptu dance with Linda. Recognizing her from New Year's Eve, he demands that Jim prepare them a number to perform in the next show.

On Washington's Birthday, Ted and Linda dance in elaborate 18th-century period costumes, with Jim sabotaging their tempo from a minuet to jazz throughout. Linda refuses Ted's offer to become his dance partner, saying that she and Jim are to be married. When Ted asks him about the engagement, Jim plays it off, but Ted is unconvinced.

At Easter, romance blossoms between Jim and Linda. They are met by Ted, who asks to remain in Jim's shows to experience "the true happiness" they have found. Linda is charmed, but Jim is suspicious.

Jim's apprehensions are confirmed on Independence Day, when he overhears Ted and Danny's bringing a pair of Hollywood representatives to audition Ted and Linda for motion pictures from that night's show. Jim bribes teamster Gus to stall Linda, who ends up driving the pair into a creek. Linda gets picked up on the roadside by Lila. Having left the penniless "millionaire", she crows that she will be Ted's partner that night for the studio tryout. Assuming that Jim made the switch to keep her from leaving, Linda directs Lila into the creek.

At the inn, Ted is forced to improvise a solo, a fireworks-studded tap dance routine. Linda arrives, irritated that Jim did not trust her to make her own decision. She joins Ted, Hollywood-bound. Jim reluctantly agrees to let the eager producers make a film about Holiday Inn, but vows not to leave the Inn.

Thanksgiving finds the Inn closed, and Jim wallowing in self-pity. As he prepares to mail his new song, his housekeeper Mamie implores him to fight to win Linda back.

Jim arrives in California on Christmas Eve, just as Ted and Linda plan to marry. Jim confronts Ted in his dressing room, gets locked in, then turns the tables on Ted and Danny. On the set of Linda's movie, a meticulous recreation of Holiday Inn, Jim leaves his pipe on the piano and hides as Linda enters and performs "White Christmas". Reflexively ringing tiny bells with it as he did, she falters, then continues waveringly as Jim's voice joins her. Jim appears and Linda runs to him.

Back at Holiday Inn on New Year's Eve, Ted is reunited with Lila. Jim and Linda sing a duet, affirming their love.

== Cast ==
- Bing Crosby as Jim Hardy
- Fred Astaire as Ted Hanover
- Marjorie Reynolds as Linda Mason (singing voice dubbed by Martha Mears)
- Walter Abel as Danny Reed
- Virginia Dale as Lila Dixon
- Louise Beavers as Mamie
- Irving Bacon as Gus
- Leon Belasco as flower store manager
- Marek Windheim as François
- James Bell as Dunbar (from Hollywood)
- John Gallaudet as Parker (from Hollywood)
- Shelby Bacon as Vanderbilt
- Joan Arnold as Daphne
- Harry Barris as musician
- Bud Jamison as Sidewalk Santa Claus; opening scene
- Noel Neill as dancer in "Abraham" number

== Production ==
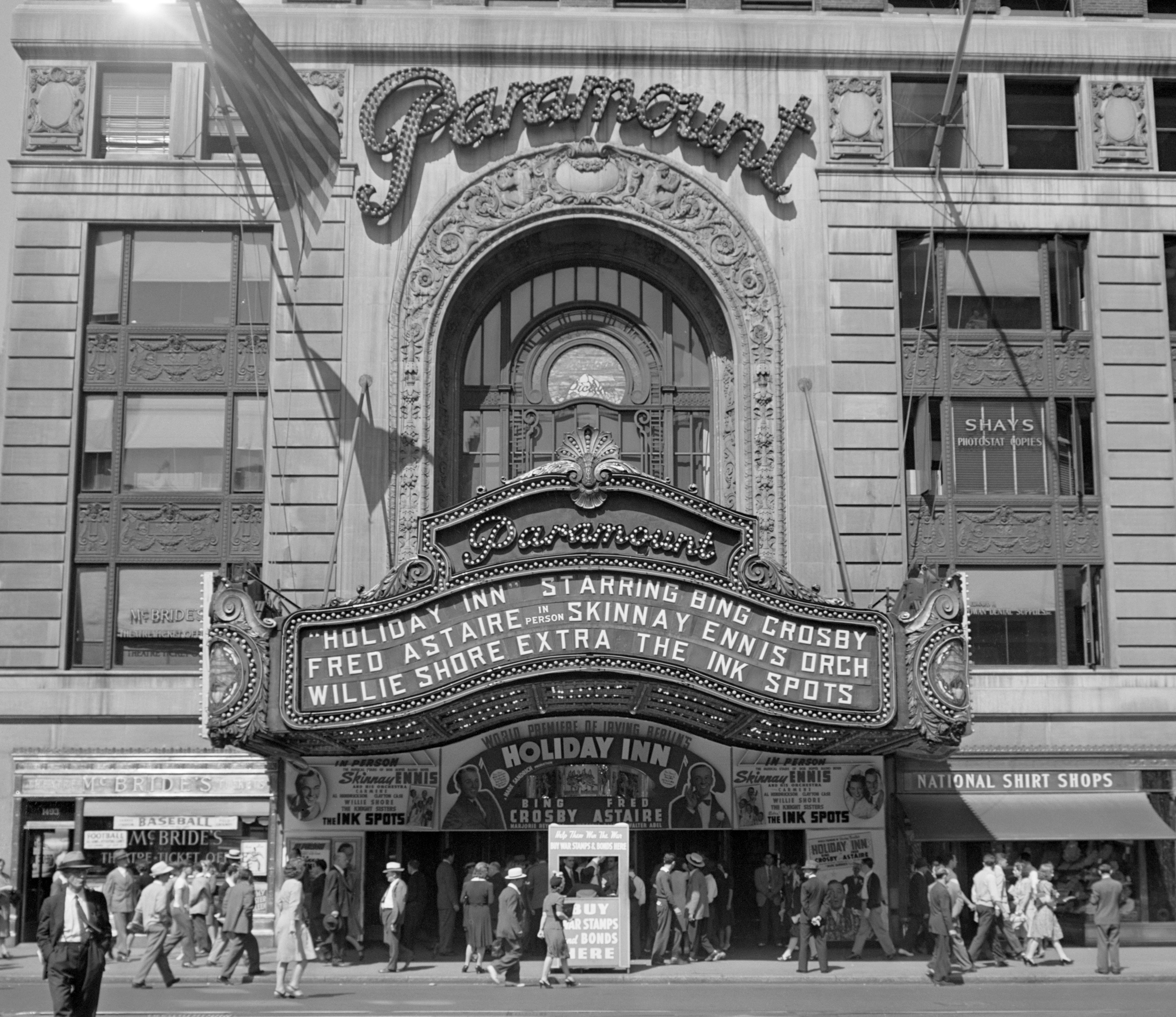
The Paramount Theatre in Manhattan presented the world premiere of Holiday Inn on August 4, 1942, as part of a benefit for Navy Relief.

In May 1940, Irving Berlin signed an exclusive contract with Paramount Pictures to write songs for a musical film based on his idea of an inn that opened only on public holidays. Bing Crosby and Fred Astaire were the stars of Holiday Inn with support from Marjorie Reynolds and Virginia Dale. Filming took place between November 18, 1941, and January 30, 1942. Produced and directed by Mark Sandrich, Holiday Inn had its premiere at the Paramount Theatre in New York City on August 4, 1942. It was a success in the US and the UK, the highest-grossing film musical to that time. It was expected that "Be Careful, It's My Heart" would be the hit song. While it did very well, "White Christmas" topped the charts in October 1942 instead, and stayed there for eleven weeks. Another Berlin song, "Happy Holiday", is featured over the opening credits and within the film storyline.

Filming outside the studio occurred at the Village Inn Resort in Monte Rio on the Russian River, in Sonoma County, California.

Many segments of the film are preceded by shots of a calendar with a visual symbol of the given holiday. For November, an animated turkey is shown running back and forth between the third and fourth Thursdays, finally shrugging its shoulders in confusion. This is a satirical reference to the "Franksgiving" controversy created when President Franklin D. Roosevelt tried to expand the Christmas shopping season by declaring Thanksgiving a week earlier than before, leading to Congress setting Thanksgiving as the fourth Thursday in November by law.

The Japanese attack on Pearl Harbor in Hawaii occurred halfway through filming. As a result, the Fourth of July segment was expanded beyond Fred Astaire's firecracker dance to include the patriotic number that highlights the strength of the US military.

== Music ==
=== "White Christmas" ===
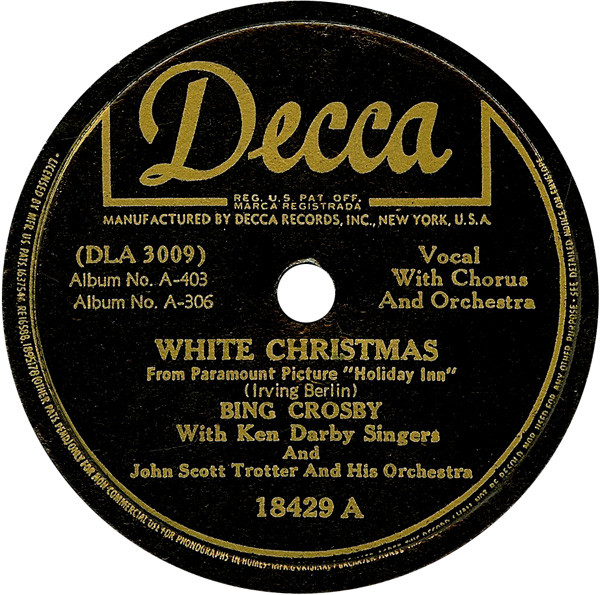
"White Christmas" (Decca Records 1942)

The song that would become "White Christmas" was conceived by Berlin on the set of the film Top Hat in 1935. He hummed the melody to Astaire and the film's director Mark Sandrich as a song possibility for a future Astaire-Ginger Rogers vehicle. Astaire loved the tune, but Sandrich passed on it. Berlin's assignment for Paramount was to write a song about each of the major holidays of the year. He found that writing a song about Christmas was the most challenging, due to his Jewish upbringing. When Crosby first heard Berlin play "White Christmas" in 1941 at the first rehearsals, he did not immediately recognize its full potential. Crosby simply said: "I don't think we have any problems with that one, Irving."

Although "White Christmas" has become iconic, this was not the original intention. The song "Be Careful, It's My Heart", played during the Valentine's Day section of the film, was originally intended to be a bigger hit when production of Holiday Inn commenced.

The song is used during the Christmas holiday sections of the movie, most notably when it is introduced to Linda Mason (Reynolds) by Jim Hardy (Crosby) while she is trying to obtain a position in the shows at the inn. Hardy begins playing the song to her allowing her to join him and eventually perform solo. The song is also reprised near the end of the movie. Chrysotile asbestos was used to make the fake snow used in this scene.

=== Song releases ===
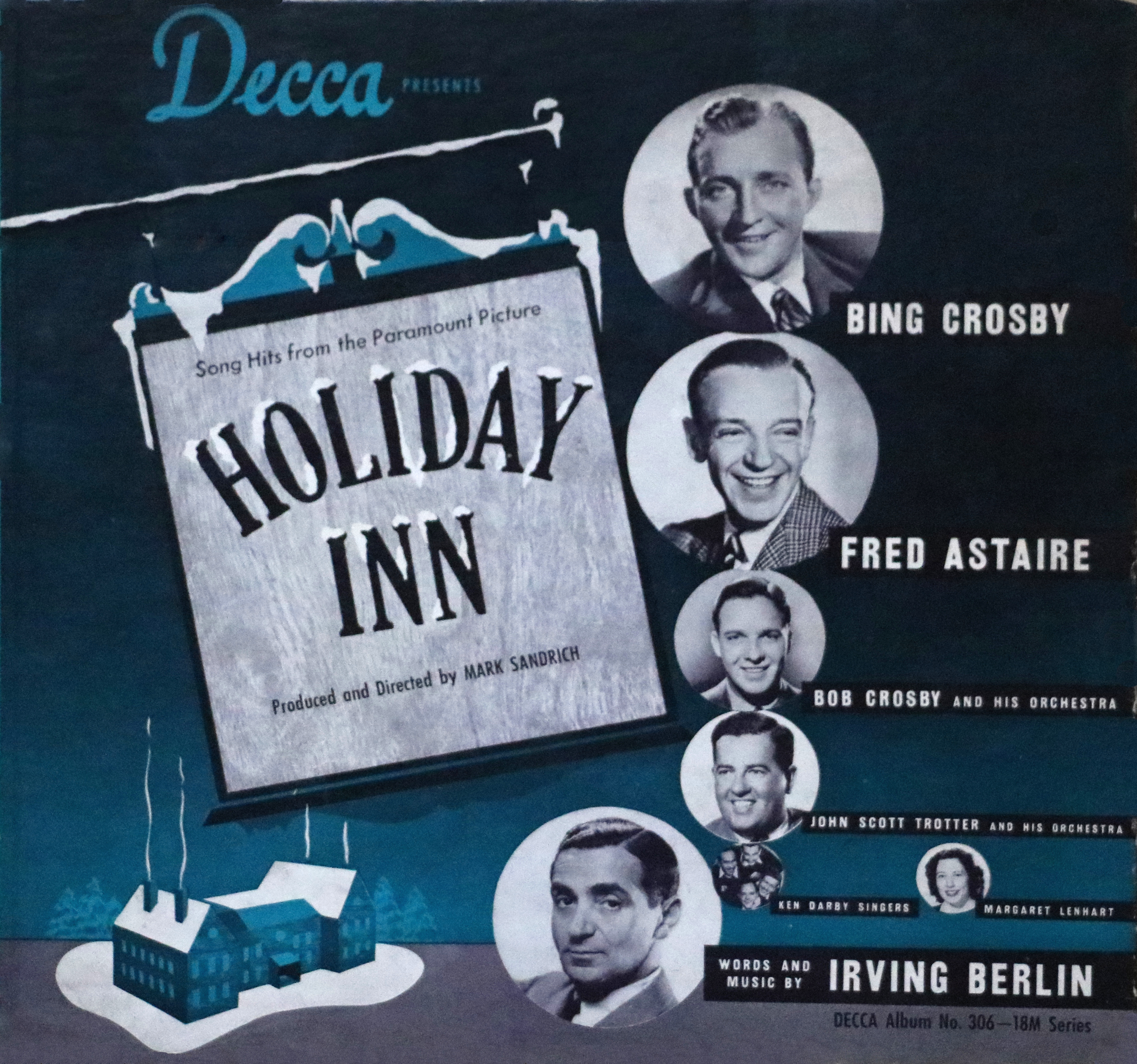
Song Hits from Holiday Inn (Decca Records 1942)

Full-length studio recordings of the film's songs, differing slightly from those in the movie, were made for commercial release. Initially issued on 78rpm records, they were later collected on LP, cassette and CD.

=== Soundtrack ===
Album cover of Soundtrack from Holiday Inn

Soundtrack from Holiday Inn is a soundtrack album of Bing Crosby and Fred Astaire singing Irving Berlin songs that were taken directly from Holiday Inn. This soundtrack was first released on vinyl LP. These songs differ slightly, and are often faster than the ones released to the public on 78 rpm phonograph records, in order to save time.

It was not until 1979, 37 years after the making of the film, that a full soundtrack was released on Sunbeam Records (STK-112) of the songs in the movie.

In 2004, the Soundtrack Factory label released a soundtrack of the original recordings taken directly from the movie. Martha Mears performed Marjorie Reynolds' singing in the movie, so it is her voice which is heard. All songs are sung by Bing Crosby unless stated. The track list is:

1. "Main Title: Overture"
2. "I'll Capture Your Heart Singing" (with Fred Astaire & Virginia Dale)
3. "Lazy"
4. "You're Easy to Dance With" (Fred Astaire)
5. "White Christmas" (with Marjorie Reynolds)
6. "Happy Holiday" (with Marjorie Reynolds)
7. "Let's Start the New Year Right"
8. "Abraham" (with Marjorie Reynolds & Louise Beavers)
9. "Be Careful, It's My Heart"
10. "I Can't Tell a Lie" (Fred Astaire)
11. "Easter Parade"
12. "Song of Freedom"
13. "Let's Say It with Firecrackers" (sung by chorus as Fred Astaire dances)
14. "I've Got Plenty to Be Thankful For"
15. "Hollywood Medley"
16. "White Christmas" [second version] (with Marjorie Reynolds)
17. "Ending Medley" (with Fred Astaire, Marjorie Reynolds & Virginia Dale)
18. Holiday Inn movie trailer (audio only - bonus track)

== Home media ==
Holiday Inn was first released on VHS and Beta formats in September 1981 by MCA Home Video, re-released in 1986 and again, on VHS only, in 1992.

It was first released on DVD paired with another Crosby vehicle, Going My Way (1944). It added a trailer for each film and some text-based extras. This version is also available in many boxed set collections of holiday-themed or Crosby-themed movies.

In 2006, it was released as a single-disc "Special Edition" featuring a commentary by Ken Barnes, with interspersed archival comments by Crosby and Astaire. It also included A Couple of Song and Dance Men, a documentary on Astaire and Crosby; All-Singing All-Dancing, a featurette on audio recording of movie musicals; and a reissue theatrical trailer.

In 2008, it was released as a three-disc "Collector's Edition" containing the previous DVD and a second disc with a newly computer-colorized version and Coloring a Classic, a featurette on the colorization. Also included was a CD of the 12-track Song Hits from Holiday Inn album, featuring original full-length studio recordings of the film's songs.

In 2014, it was released on Blu-ray as a single disc edition featuring both black and white and colorized versions and all previous DVD extras.

In 2017, it was released again on both formats, this time including a second disc featuring a performance of the 2016 Broadway adaptation.

== Reception ==
The film ranked No. 6 in the list of top-grossing movies for 1942 in the US.

Theodore Strauss of The New York Times described it as "all very easy and graceful; it never tries too hard to dazzle; even in the rousing and topical Fourth of July number, it never commits a breach of taste by violently waving the flag. Instead, it has skipped back over the year in an affectionate and light-hearted spirit." Variety called it "a winner all the way" with "sterling" performances by the male leads. Harrison's Reports called it "a most delightful entertainment .... The performances of the leading players are very good." Film Daily described it as "a completely satisfying musical filled with crisp comedy, fetching music, snappy dance routines, first-rate acting, smart story touches, and lavish and beautiful settings".

On the review aggregator website Rotten Tomatoes, 100% of 25 critics' reviews are positive, with an average rating of 7.2/10. The website's consensus reads: "With the combined might of Bing Crosby, Fred Astaire, and Irving Berlin working in its favor, Holiday Inn is a seasonal classic—not least because it introduced 'White Christmas' to the world."

== Legacy ==
The success of the song "White Christmas" eventually led to another film based on the song, White Christmas (1954), which starred Crosby, Danny Kaye, Rosemary Clooney, and Vera-Ellen. It was an extremely loose remake of Holiday Inn, with a plot again involving an inn, but otherwise different from the earlier film. Fred Astaire was offered the second lead in the new film, but after reading the script, he declined. The role was then offered to Donald O'Connor, but he was injured before filming began. Danny Kaye ultimately took the role.

In 2004, the American Film Institute listed "White Christmas" at No. 5 in its 100 Years...100 Songs.

A colorized version of Holiday Inn was released by Universal on October 14, 2008. The colorization was done by Legend Films, which used Edith Head’s sketch artist, Jan Muckelstone, as a color design consultant for costume authenticity.

The name of the Holiday Inn hotel chain was inspired by the film. The title of the film also inspired the 1946 renaming of a small 19th century inn in Intervale, New Hampshire. By right of precedence its owners were able to bar any other use of the name in that area of New Hampshire until they chose to relinquish it.

=== Blackface controversy ===
Beginning in the 1980s, some broadcasts of the film have entirely omitted the "Abraham" musical number, staged at the Inn for Lincoln's Birthday, because of its depiction of a blackface minstrel show incorporating racist images and behaviors. However, because Turner Classic Movies airs films uncut and unedited, the network has left the "Abraham" number intact during their screenings of Holiday Inn. AMC also aired the film intact before it became an advertiser-supported channel. To avoid advertiser objections, the edited version now airs annually on AMC.

In 2018, British Prime Minister Theresa May named Holiday Inn as her favorite Christmas film, causing controversy due to the blackface performance in the "Abraham" segment.

== Adaptations ==
Holiday Inn was dramatized as a half-hour radio play on the January 11, 1943, CBS broadcast of The Screen Guild Theater, starring Crosby and Astaire with Dinah Shore. On December 15, 1952, The Railroad Hour presented a half-hour adaption of the film. The episode starred Gordon MacRae and Dorothy Warenskjold.

In 2013, Universal Stage Productions, the live theater division of Universal Pictures, invited Goodspeed Musicals to develop a stage adaptation of the film. With book by Gordon Greenberg and Chad Hodge, music from the films Holiday Inn and White Christmas (since Paramount Skydance through Paramount Pictures now remains and currently owns the rights for the 1954 adaptation of White Christmas) plus other Berlin songs, and directed by Greenberg, the musical premiered at the Goodspeed Opera House in East Haddam, Connecticut, on September 19, 2014. The Roundabout Theatre Company production of Holiday Inn began previews on Broadway at Studio 54 on September 1, 2016, before the official opening on October 6. The cast included Bryce Pinkham as Jim, Megan Lawrence as Louise, Corbin Bleu as Ted, and Lee Wilkof as Danny.

== See also ==
- List of Christmas films
