= Parole Fixer =

1940 film by Robert Florey

- Directed by: Robert Florey
- Screenplay by: William R. Lipman; Horace McCoy
- Based on: Persons in Hiding; 1938 book by J. Edgar Hoover
- Produced by: Edward T. Lowe Jr.
- Starring: William Henry; Lyle Talbot; Virginia Dale; Richard Denning; Anthony Quinn; Robert Paige
- Cinematography: Harry Fischbeck
- Edited by: Harvey Johnston
- Music by: Gerard Carbonara; John Leipold; Leo Shuken (uncredited)
- Production company: Paramount Pictures
- Distributed by: Paramount Pictures
- Release date: February 2, 1940
- Running time: 58 minutes
- Country: United States
- Language: English

Parole Fixer is a 1940 American crime film directed by Robert Florey.

Federal Bureau of Investigation Director J. Edgar Hoover is credited for the source material, the 1938 book called Persons in Hiding, a purported expose of corruption within the parole system.

== Plot ==
Gangster "Big Boy" Bradmore is wrongly paroled from prison and promptly murders an FBI agent.

== Cast ==
- William Henry as Scott Britton
- Virginia Dale as Enid Casserly
- Robert Paige as Steve Eddson
- Gertrude Michael as Collette Menthe
- Richard Denning as Bruce Eaton
- Fay Helm as Rita Mattison
- Anthony Quinn as Francis 'Big Boy' Bradmore
- Harvey Stephens as Bartley Hanford
- Marjorie Gateson as Mrs. Thorton Casserly
- Lyle Talbot as Ross Waring
- Louise Beavers as Aunt Lindy
- Paul McGrath as Tyler Craden
- Jack Carson as George Mattison
