= Aggie Appleby, Maker of Men =

1933 film by Mark Sandrich

Aggie Appleby Maker of Men
- Theatrical release poster
- Directed by: Mark Sandrich
- Screenplay by: Humphrey Pearson; Edward Kaufman
- Based on: Aggie Appleby Maker of Men; 1932 play by Joseph Kesselring
- Produced by: Pandro S. Berman
- Starring: Charles Farrell; Wynne Gibson; William Gargan; ZaSu Pitts; Betty Furness; Blanche Friderici
- Cinematography: J. Roy Hunt
- Edited by: Basil Wrangell
- Music by: Roy Webb
- Production company: RKO Pictures
- Distributed by: RKO Pictures
- Release date: November 3, 1933
- Running time: 73 minutes
- Country: United States
- Language: English

Aggie Appleby, Maker of Men is a 1933 American pre-Code comedy film directed by Mark Sandrich and written by Humphrey Pearson and Edward Kaufman. The film stars Charles Farrell, Wynne Gibson, William Gargan, ZaSu Pitts, Betty Furness and Blanche Friderici. The film was released on November 3, 1933, by RKO Pictures.

== Plot ==
Streetwise Agnes "Aggie" Appleby, a waitress at Nick's Restaurant, gets into a mass fight and escapes with friend Red Branahan. The fight was about her honor. They live together, but the money isn't coming in as it should. Branahan is caught by the police and jailed. Her landlady puts her out because she's unable to pay the rent, so Aggie goes to her friend Sybby, a cleaning lady who puts Aggie in the room of a man who's expected to be away for a few hours so Aggie can get some sleep. However, the man, Adoniram "Schlumpy" Schlump, comes back earlier than expected because he's hoping for a letter from Evangeline, a young woman of his elevated socioeconomic class whom he loves. Because Schlump is compassionate and because Aggie has nowhere to go and no money, he lets her stay indefinitely (he sleeps on the couch and gives her the bed) -- and she sets to work on helping him find work and on remaking his life.

She finds him a job at a construction site on the other side of the road, re-christening him Red Branahan because she considers his actual name an impediment. After several weeks of their growing relationship, Schlump asks Aggie to marry him, but she fears that their different social and cultural backgrounds could become a problem. Auntie and Evangeline pop up at his room, so Aggie pretends to be a maid but is insulted by Auntie and storms out. Aggie ultimately sends Schlumpy back to Evangeline -- and then sets out to improve Red's life.

== Cast ==
- Charles Farrell as Adoniram "Schlumpy" Schlump
- Wynne Gibson as Agnes "Aggie" Appleby
- William Gargan as Red Branahan
- ZaSu Pitts as Sybby "Sib"
- Betty Furness as Evangeline
- Blanche Friderici as Aunt Katherine
