= Abram Wolf Edelman =

Polish-born American rabbi

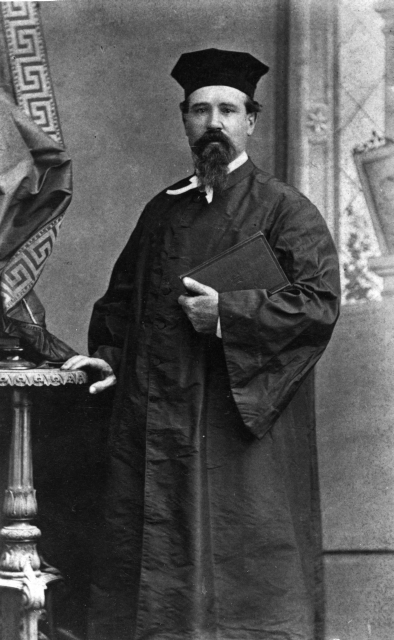
- Born: August 17, 1832; Kutno, Poland
- Died: July 26, 1907 (aged 74); Los Angeles, California, United States
- Resting place: Home of Peace Cemetery
- Occupation: Rabbi
- Spouse: Hannah Pessah Cohn
- Children: Benjamin Edelman; Abram M. Edelman; Henry W. Edelman; David W. Edelman; Rachel Edelman; Matilda Edelman

Abram Wolf Edelman (a.k.a. Abraham Edelman) (1832–1907) was a Polish-born American rabbi. He was the first rabbi in Los Angeles, California, serving as the first rabbi of Congregation B'nai B'rith, from 1862 to 1885. It is now known as the Wilshire Boulevard Temple.

== Early life ==
Abram Wolf Edelman was born on August 17, 1832, in Kutno, Poland. He had a classic Jewish education. He married and immigrated to the United States with his wife in 1851, the year he turned nineteen.

By 1858, they moved to San Francisco, California, where he studied Jewish theology and taught Hebrew. He also learned Spanish well enough to speak it.

== Career ==
After completing his education, Edelman was invited to move to Los Angeles to serve as the rabbi of its first Jewish, founded by Joseph Newmark. As a result, he became the first rabbi in Los Angeles, serving at Congregation B'nai B'rith from 1862 to 1885. He was also the cantor.

According to Harris Newmark, another pioneer of the Newmark family, Edelman later resigned because he was an Orthodox rabbi and the congregation was slowly becoming Reform. But his services were not stricto sensu Orthodox. They included "mixed seating, a mixed choir, Conformation, English prayers and English sermons."

Edelman acquired a building on the corner of 6th and Main streets in Downtown Los Angeles, across the street from the Pacific Electric Building, and collected rents from it.

He became a Freemason, joining Masonic Lodge #42 in Los Angeles. He was also a member of the fraternal Order of United Workmen and the Independent Order of Foresters.

== Personal life ==
He married Hannah Pessah Cohn in Warsaw in 1851, the year they immigrated to the United States. They had four sons, Benjamin, Abram M., Henry W. and David W., and two daughters, Rachel and Matilda. Their son, Abram M. Edelman, became a prolific architect in Los Angeles. Several of his buildings have been listed on the National Register of Historic Places. Another son, David W. Edelman, became a doctor and later served as chief of staff at the Cedars of Lebanon Hospital, later known as the Cedars-Sinai Medical Center.

== Death ==
Edelman died on July 26, 1907, in Los Angeles. He was buried at the Home of Peace Cemetery, a Jewish cemetery in East Los Angeles.
