= Love Thy Neighbor (1940 film) =

- Directed by: Mark Sandrich
- Written by: Edmund Beloin; William Morrow; Zion Myers; Ernest Pagano
- Produced by: Mark Sandrich
- Starring: Jack Benny; Fred Allen; Mary Martin; Verree Teasdale
- Cinematography: Ted Tetzlaff
- Edited by: LeRoy Stone
- Music by: Victor Young
- Production company: Paramount Pictures
- Distributed by: Paramount Pictures
- Release date: 1940
- Running time: 82 minutes
- Country: United States
- Language: English

Love Thy Neighbor is an American comedy musical film produced by Paramount in 1940 which starred Jack Benny and Fred Allen, directed by Mark Sandrich. It features Mary Martin with her famous fur coat striptease performance of "My Heart Belongs to Daddy" which is set in a stage revue.

== Plot summary ==
On New Year's Eve 1940, two famous radio stars with competing comedy shows, Jack Benny and Fred Allen (played by themselves), get into a real fix based on the ongoing feud between them, a recurring feature of the two men's radio shows for years.

When Jack crashes his car into Fred's car, followed by several additional crashes between the two cars, they both end up in jail for reckless driving. Because of the severity of the crashes and the recklessness of the two men, Fred's niece Mary (played by Mary Martin) believes Fred has gone insane. To attempt to end the feud between Fred and Jack, Mary goes to Jack's office to attempt to talk with him. While she is there, an actress named Virginia Astor fails to turn up for her audition for Jack's upcoming stage show, and Mary takes advantage of the opportunity by pretending she is Virginia and attends the audition. She is good enough to get the lead role in Jack's show and has to go to Miami for the opening.

Fred is also in Miami to rest up before his premiere for the season, and a series of unfortunate events follow as the feud between the two men escalades. A boat chase ends in a collision with both men being knocked unconscious. Mary tries to end their feud by saying that Jack saved Fred's life after the accident, but it doesn't take long before the two are at each other's throats again. As this point, Jack still believes that Mary is Virginia Astor. When Jack finds out who Mary really is, he fires her from his show.

In an effort to regain her role in the show and her relationship with Jack, Mary then acquires a controlling share of stock in the show from Josephine, girlfriend of Jack's former and future employee Rochester. (Josephine has acquired the stock from Rochester.) However, Fred is Mary's legal guardian and controls Mary's financial interests until she is married, so he now has the controlling interest in his rival's show.

Because Jack and Mary are in love, they decide to marry and regain control of the show from Fred. Fred attempts to thwart their plan by putting the real Virginia Astor in Jack's shower before the wedding, making Mary believe Jack is having an affair with the actress. Jack finds proof of Fred's hoax and explains everything to Mary. Sometime later, Mary is seen out in a park pushing a baby carriage containing two babies who look exactly like, and are bickering like, Fred and Jack. In the park Mary meets Josephine, who herself is pushing a baby carriage containing a baby who looks exactly like Rochester.

== Cast ==
- Jack Benny as Jack Benny
- Fred Allen as Fred Allen
- Mary Martin as Mary Allen
- Verree Teasdale as Barbara Allen
- Eddie Anderson as Rochester
- Virginia Dale as Virginia Astor
- Theresa Harris as Josephine
- Richard Denning as Joe
- Jack Carson as Policeman
- Barnett Parker as George
- Russell Hicks as Mr. Harrington
- Mary Kelley as Chambermaid

== Bibliography ==
- Thomas Schatz. Boom and Bust: American Cinema in the 1940s. University of California Press, 1999.
