= Kiss the Boys Goodbye =

1941 comedy film by Victor Schertzinger

- Directed by: Victor Schertzinger
- Written by: Dwight Taylor; Harry Tugend
- Based on: Kiss the Boys Goodbye by Clare Boothe Luce
- Produced by: Paul Jones; William LeBaron
- Starring: Don Ameche; Mary Martin; Oscar Levant; Virginia Dale
- Cinematography: Ted Tetzlaff
- Edited by: Paul Weatherwax
- Music by: Victor Young
- Production company: Paramount Pictures
- Distributed by: Paramount Pictures
- Release date: August 1, 1941
- Running time: 85 minutes
- Country: United States
- Language: English

Kiss the Boys Goodbye is a 1941 American musical comedy film directed by Victor Schertzinger and starring Mary Martin, Don Ameche and Oscar Levant. It is based on a play by Clare Boothe Luce which was inspired by the search for an actress to play Scarlett O'Hara in the film version of Gone with the Wind. The score, under the musical direction of Victor Young, includes the title song and "Sand in My Shoes," both by Frank Loesser and Victor Schertzinger.

== Plot ==
Cindy Lou Bethany was raised in the South and works as an actress and chorus girl in New York City seeking a starring role. She auditioned to portray a Southern belle in a major production, but the audition concluded before she could perform for director Lloyd Lloyd.

The show's financial backer Top Rumson and writer Bert Fisher would like to hire a newcomer, but Lloyd feels more comfortable with his old standby, Myra Stanhope, even though she seems all wrong for this part. The producers travel South to cast the role, so Cindy Lou follows them there, looking up her Aunt Lily Lou and Uncle Jefferson Davis Bethany and scheming to show the New Yorkers what she can do.

Cindy Lou surprises everyone, not only with a musical number showing off her talents, but with a striptease thrown in that ends up with her diving into a swimming pool. Rayburn and others are delighted, but Lloyd is unamused and Gwen quarrels with Cindy Lou, who proceeds to toss her into the pool, too. By the time Lloyd returns to New York, however, he realizes that exactly the actress he is looking for is Cindy Lou, making her a star.

== Cast ==
- Mary Martin as Cindy Lou Bethany
- Don Ameche as Lloyd Lloyd
- Oscar Levant as Dick Rayburn
- Virginia Dale as Gwen Abbott
- Raymond Walburn as Top Rumson
- Barbara Jo Allen as Myra Stanhope
- Minor Watson as Uncle Jeff
- Elizabeth Patterson as Aunt Lily Lou
- Jerome Cowan as Bert Fisher
- Connee Boswell as Polly
- Emory Parnell as Deputy

== Original play ==
Luce completed the play in 1937 for producer Max Gordon. Brock Pemberton was attached as director.

The play opened in 1938.
