= Jay Sandrich =

American television director (1932–2021)

- Born: Jay Henry Sandrich; February 24, 1932; Los Angeles, California, U.S.
- Died: September 22, 2021 (aged 89); Los Angeles, California, U.S.
- Education: University of California, Los Angeles
- Occupation: Television director
- Years active: 1956–2003
- Spouses: Nina Kramer (m. 1953; div. 1976); Linda Green Silverstein (m. 1984)
- Children: 3
- Parent: Mark Sandrich
- Relatives: Ruth Harriet Louise (aunt)

Jay Henry Sandrich (February 24, 1932 – September 22, 2021) was an American television director who primarily worked on sitcoms. In 2020, he was inducted into the Television Hall of Fame.

== Early life ==
Jay Sandrich was born in Los Angeles, the son of film director Mark Sandrich. The younger Sandrich attended the University of California, Los Angeles, graduating with a B.A. in 1953.

== Career ==
Preferring to work in television rather than feature film production (which would keep him apart from his young family), Sandrich began his television work in the mid-1950s as a second assistant director with Desilu Productions as an assistant director on I Love Lucy, December Bride, and Our Miss Brooks. As Sandrich later noted,

The reason I got that job was my father had directed Lucy's first picture. She later told me she was very nervous and kept blowing her lines, and he was really lovely to her. So if my father hadn't been in the business and been the person he was, I probably never would have gotten all these chances. So a lot of it is nepotism. Keeping your job was different, but getting the jobs—that's the only reason.

Sandrich directed and/or produced episodes of The Bill Dana Show; The Bill Cosby Show; Get Smart; The Odd Couple; Paul Sand in Friends and Lovers; Loves Me, Loves Me Not; Soap; two-thirds of the episodes of The Mary Tyler Moore Show in early seasons and recurring including the series finale; he also directed 100 episodes including the entire first two seasons and the series finale of The Cosby Show. He also directed the series pilot episodes of The Bob Newhart Show, WKRP in Cincinnati, Benson, Empty Nest and The Golden Girls. His last work as a director on television was an episode of Two and a Half Men in 2003.

In 1965, Sandrich put in his only stint as a producer, serving as associate producer for the first season of the NBC-TV comedy Get Smart, which co-starred Don Adams and Barbara Feldon. He enjoyed the experience but vowed to stick to directing in future. He told Andy Meisler of Channels magazine, "I really didn't like producing. I liked being on the stage. I found that, as a producer, I'd stay up until four in the morning worrying about everything. As a director, I slept at night."

Sandrich described the responsibilities of a television director as finding good writers and actors, then creating "an atmosphere in which the actors can do their best work. The director is one step closer to the performers and therefore more able to shape the script to the actors' needs and to come up with small bits of stage business."

James Burrows, a director mentored by Sandrich on The Mary Tyler Moore Show, recalls,

I watched Jay battle tooth and nail with [writer-producer] Jim Brooks over what they both wanted for the show. It was often a loud yet healthy and constructive exchange. It emboldened me because I learned about how a passionate exchange could get you to a great episode. Writers want you to do the script, but sometimes what works in the writers' room doesn’t work on the stage. Jay would say, "I'll do it your way, but I'm not sure it's the right way. Let me show you what we can do." That empowers the actors to feel like a larger part of the creative process.

The Cosby Show executive producer Tom Werner told Meisler, "Although we're really all here to service Bill Cosby's vision, the show is stronger because Jay challenges Bill and pushes him when appropriate." Sandrich was proud of the program's pioneering portrayal of an upper-class Black family and its civilized view of parent-child relations.

== Film ==
The only feature film Sandrich directed was Seems Like Old Times (1980), written by Neil Simon.

== Death ==
Sandrich died from complications of dementia at his home in Los Angeles on September 22, 2021, at age 89.
