= Home of Peace Cemetery (Los Angeles) =

Jewish cemetery in Los Angeles County, California

Coordinates: 34°01′18″N 118°10′30″W

Home of Peace Memorial Park
- Interactive map of Home of Peace Memorial Park

Details
- Established: 1901
- Location: 4334 Whittier Boulevard, East Los Angeles, California
- Country: United States
- Type: Jewish
- Size: 30 acres (12 ha)

Home of Peace Memorial Park and Mortuary (Hebrew: בית הקברות בית שלום Beit Kvarot Beit Shalom), also called Home of Peace Cemetery, is a Jewish cemetery and funeral home in Los Angeles County, California. Its location is at 4334 Whittier Boulevard west of Interstate 710 in East Los Angeles.

== History ==
In 1853, the first and oldest Jewish cemetery in Los Angeles was established in Chavez Ravine, near the present-day Dodger Stadium. In 1901, Kaspare Cohn donated 30 acres (12.1 ha) of land for the establishment of this cemetery. The bodies interred at Chavez Ravine were moved to East Los Angeles's Home of Peace Memorial Park between 1902 and 1910. There are a number of famous rabbis buried here, and amongst others a few celebrities from the entertainment industry as well.

== Notable interments ==
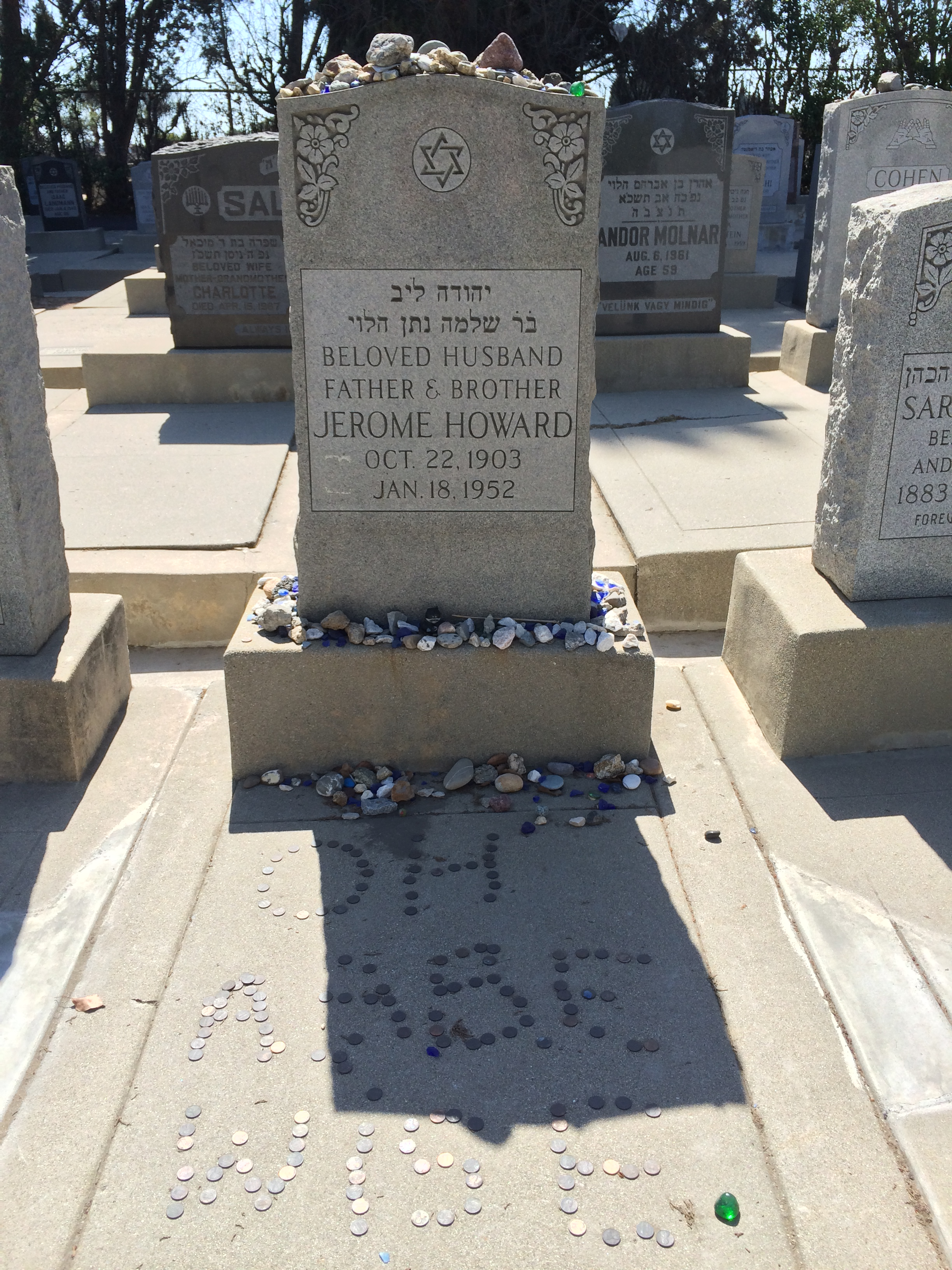
Curly Howard's grave

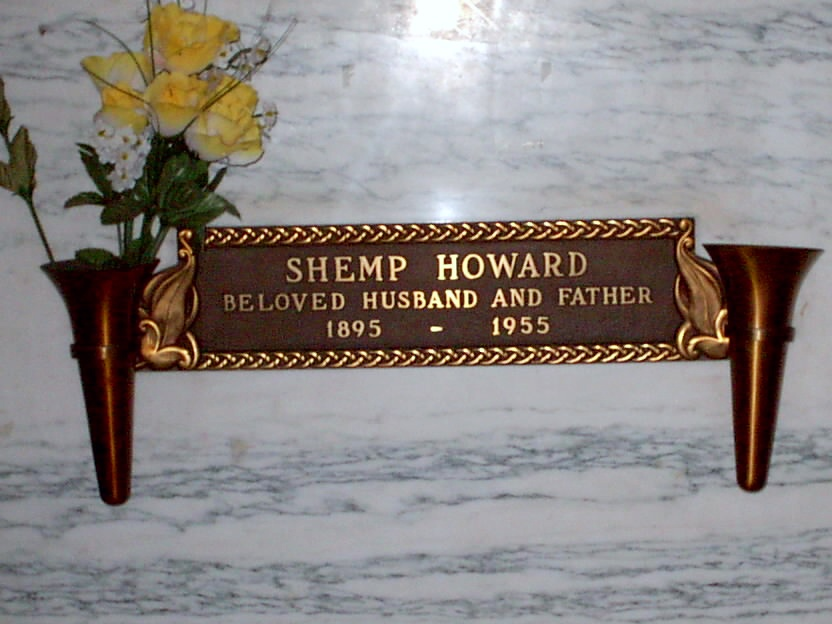
Shemp Howard's mausoleum crypt

- Inez Asher (1911–2006), television writer and novelist
- Burt Baskin (1913–1967), business magnate and co-founder of Baskin-Robbins
- David Berman (1903–1957), Jewish mobster who ran the Las Vegas Flamingo Hotel, one-time partner with Bugsy Siegel
- Susan Berman (1945–2000), author, journalist, daughter of David Berman
- Thelma Bernstein (1910–2006), actress
- Fanny Brice (1891–1951), actress and comedian (transferred to Westwood Village Memorial Park Cemetery in 1992)
- Boake Carter (1900–1944), journalist
- Lou Clayton (1890–1950), entertainer
- Abram M. Edelman (1863–1941), architect
- Harry Einstein (1904–1958), comedian
- Leo F. Forbstein (1892–1948), composer and conductor
- Mack Gordon (1904–1959), composer and lyricist
- Don Hartman (1900–1958), director
- Herman W. Hellman (1843–1906), German-born Jewish businessman, banker, and real estate investor
- Curly Howard (1903–1952), actor, comedian, member of The Three Stooges
- Shemp Howard (1895–1955), actor, comedian, member of The Three Stooges
- David A. Karnofsky (1914–1969), medical oncologist
- Carl Laemmle (1867–1939), film executive, founder of Universal Pictures; he created the "Star" system
- Carl Laemmle Jr. (1908–1979), son of Carl Laemmle and studio executive
- Carla Laemmle (1909–2014), niece of Carl Laemmle and actress
- Solomon Lazard (1827–1916), 19th Century merchant and community leader
- Ruth Harriet Louise (1903–1940), photographer
- Edgar Magnin (1890–1984), rabbi and spiritual leader
- Louis B. Mayer (1885–1957), a founder of the MGM film studios
- Joseph Mell (1915–1977), American film and television actor
- Raymond Moscatel (1931–2022), Seattle University Basketball player beat The Harlem Globe Trotters in 1952
- Carmel Myers (1899–1980), actress
- Harry Rapf (1880–1949), motion picture producer and studio executive
- Joseph Rosenberg (1881–1971) Bank of America executive vice president and motion picture lender
- Mark Sandrich (1900–1945), motion picture director
- Jack H. Skirball (1896–1985), rabbi, film producer, real estate developer and philanthropist
- Abe Stern (1888–1951), motion picture producer
- Charles Vidor (1900–1959), motion picture director
- Harry Warner (1881–1958), co-founder of Warner Brothers film studios
- Jack L. Warner (1892–1978), co-founder of Warner Brothers film studios, founder of Warner Bros. Records
- Sam Warner (1887–1927), co-founder and first CEO of Warner Brothers film studios
- Conrad Wells (born Abraham Fried) (1892–1930), cinematographer
- Osher Zilberstein (1888–1973), rabbi
