= Melody Cruise =

Studio album by Slipping Stitches
- Released: 2004
- Recorded: 2001, 2004
- Genre: Glam metal, glam punk, hard rock
- Length: 33:49

Melody Cruise is Slipping Stitches' first full-length release. Michael Monroe of Hanoi Rocks fame appears on the bonus tracks as producer, lyricist, and backing vocalist.

== Track listing ==
| | Title | Writers | Length |
|---|---|---|---|
| 1. | "Parasite" | Stitch/Starz | 3:48 |
| 2. | "I Do" | Stitch/Starz | 3:10 |
| 3. | "Not with You" | Stitch/Starz | 3:00 |
| 4. | "Edge of a Dream" | Starz | 3:28 |
| 5. | "Every Time" | Stitch/Starz | 2:49 |
| 6. | "Waiting for Me" | Starz | 3:38 |
| 7. | "She's No Angel" | Stitch/Starz | 3:06 |
| 8. | "Give Me a Sign" | Stitch/Starz | 2:54 |
| 9. | "Dry Your Eyes" | Starz | 2:47 |
| 10. | "No Privacy" | Starz/Michael Monroe/Stitch/Avenue | 2:40 |
| 11. | "What If I Knew" | Starz/Michael Monroe/Meurman/Stitch/Avenue | 5:35 |

== Personnel ==
Band

- Cashmire Starz – vocals, guitar, keyboard
- Marty Stitch – guitar, vocals, keyboard
- Madison Pulse – bass
- Lexx Avenue – drums

Guests

- Michael Monroe – vocals
