= Abram M. Edelman =

American architect

- Born: August 19, 1863; Los Angeles
- Died: September 2, 1941 (aged 78)
- Occupation: Architect
- Parent(s): Abram Wolf Edelman; Hannah Pessah Cohn Edelman
- Buildings: El Mio House; Shrine Auditorium; Breed Street Shul; Wilshire Boulevard Temple

Abram M. Edelman (1863–1941), sometimes referred to as Abraham M. Edelman or A.M. Edelman, was an American architect from Los Angeles, California. During his career, he and Samuel Tilden Norton were considered the city's preeminent synagogue architects, and several of Edelman's works (both synagogues and other buildings) are listed in the National Register of Historic Places.

== Biography ==
Abram M. Edelman was born in Los Angeles on August 19, 1863, to Abram Wolf Edelman, a migrant from Poland and the first rabbi of Los Angeles' Congregation B'nai B'rith, and Hannah Pessah Cohn Edelman. Abram was the fourth of six children.

Edelman apprenticed with architects in San Francisco, California around 1880. By 1884 he returned to Los Angeles. He partnered with his nephew Leo W. Barnett from 1905 to 1921 and Archie C. Zimmerman around 1930. At the height of Edelman's career, both he and Samuel Tilden Norton were considered the preeminent synagogue architects in Los Angeles.

Edelman died on September 2, 1941, and was buried in Home of Peace Memorial Park.

== List of works ==
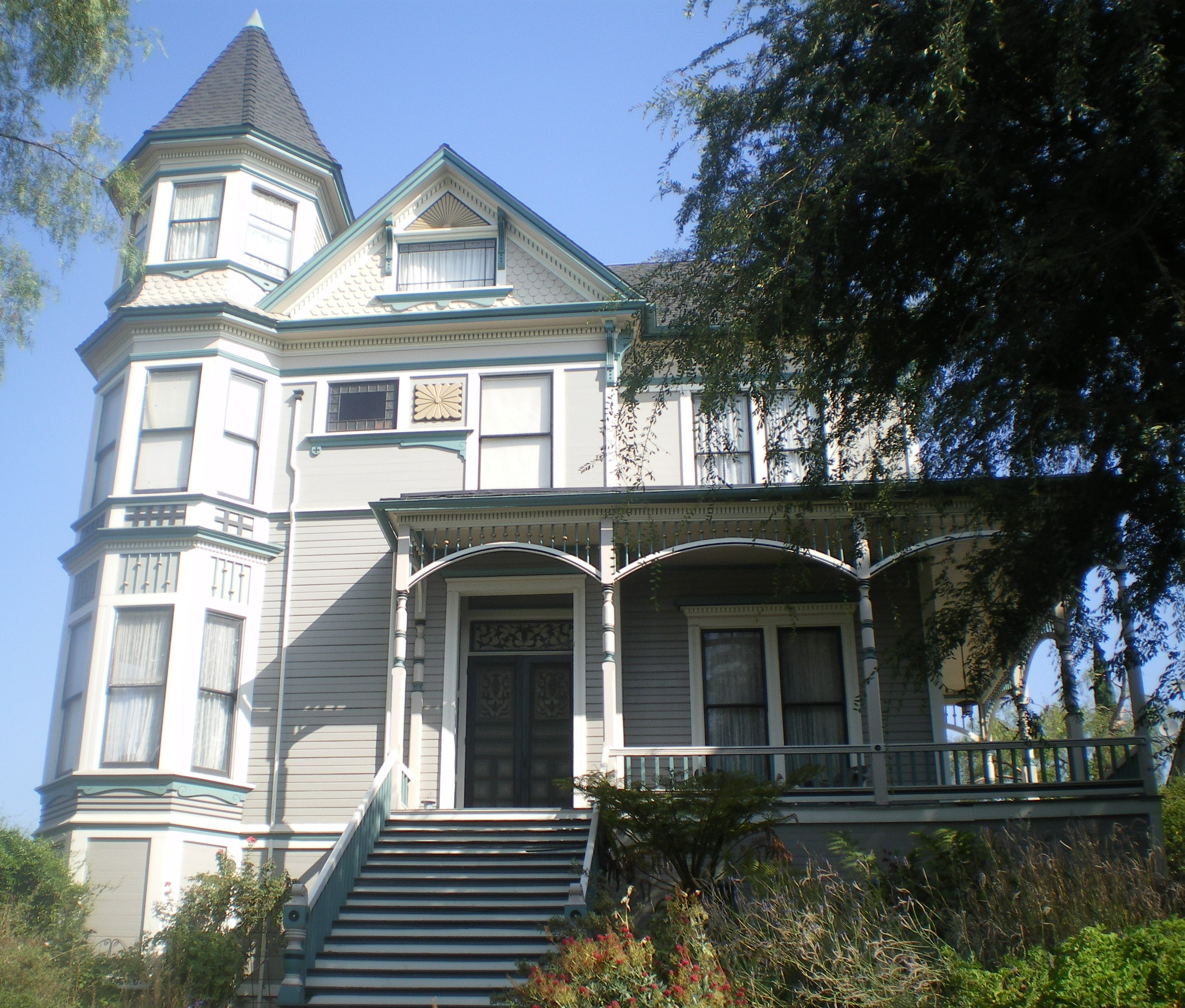
El Mio House

Edelman's notable works include (in Los Angeles unless otherwise noted):

- El Mio House (1887), NRHP-listed, LAHCM No. 142
- Congregation B'nai B'rith Temple No. 2 (1896)
- Congregation Beth Israel Temple (1902)
- Remick Building (1903), NRHP-listed
- Karl's Building (1903) NRHP-listed then delisted
- Belasco Theatre (1904) demolished 1974

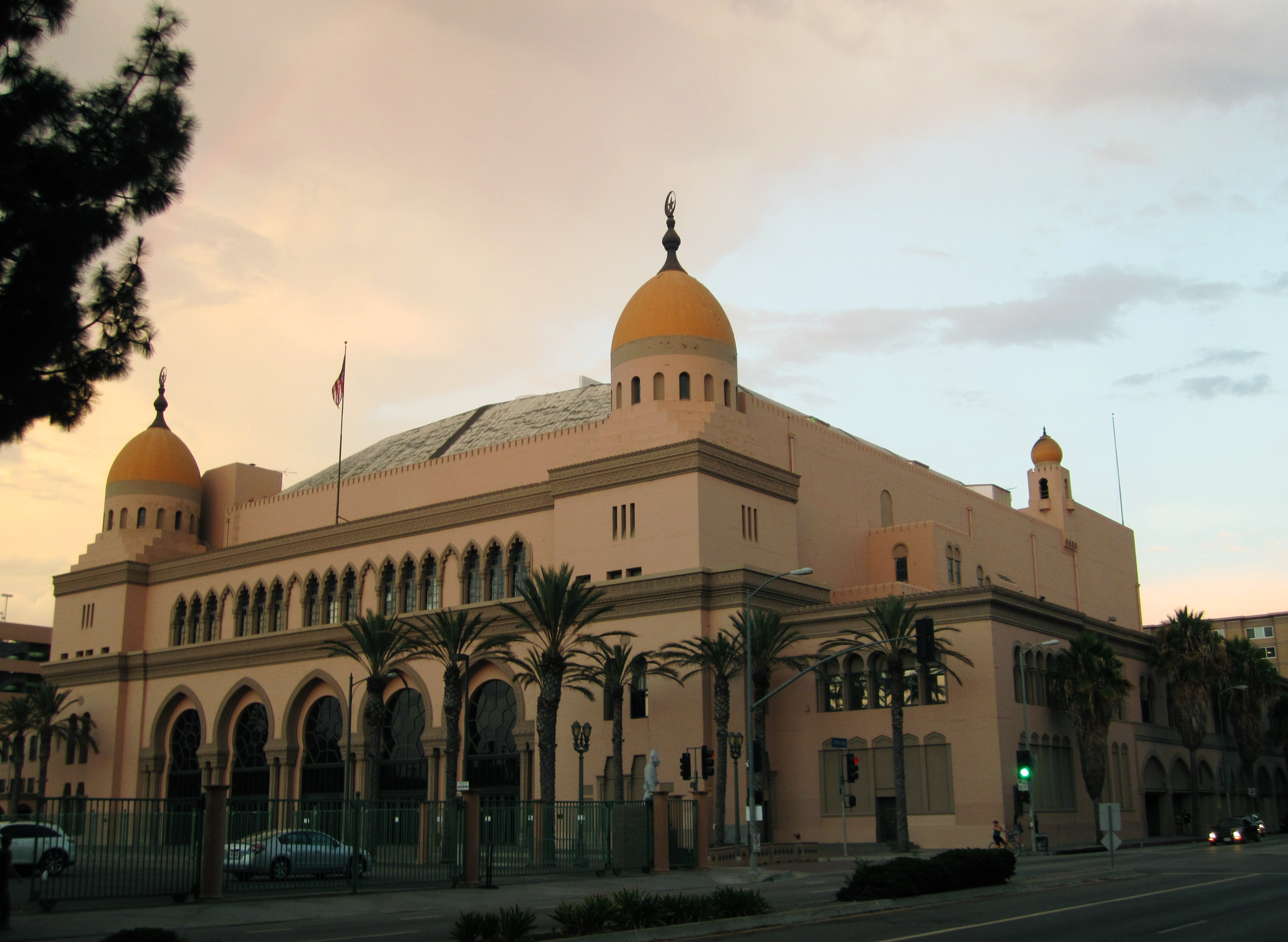
Shrine Auditorium

- Congregation Talmud Torah Temple (1923)
- Shrine Auditorium (with John C. Austin) (1925), NRHP-listed, LAHCM No. 139
- Theosophy Hall (1927)
- Alhambra Air Terminal Building (with Archie C. Zimmerman) (1928), Alhambra, California, dismantled in the late 1940s
- Congregation B'nai B'rith Temple No. 3 (1929), NRHP-listed, LAHCM No. 116

=== With Leo W. Barnett ===
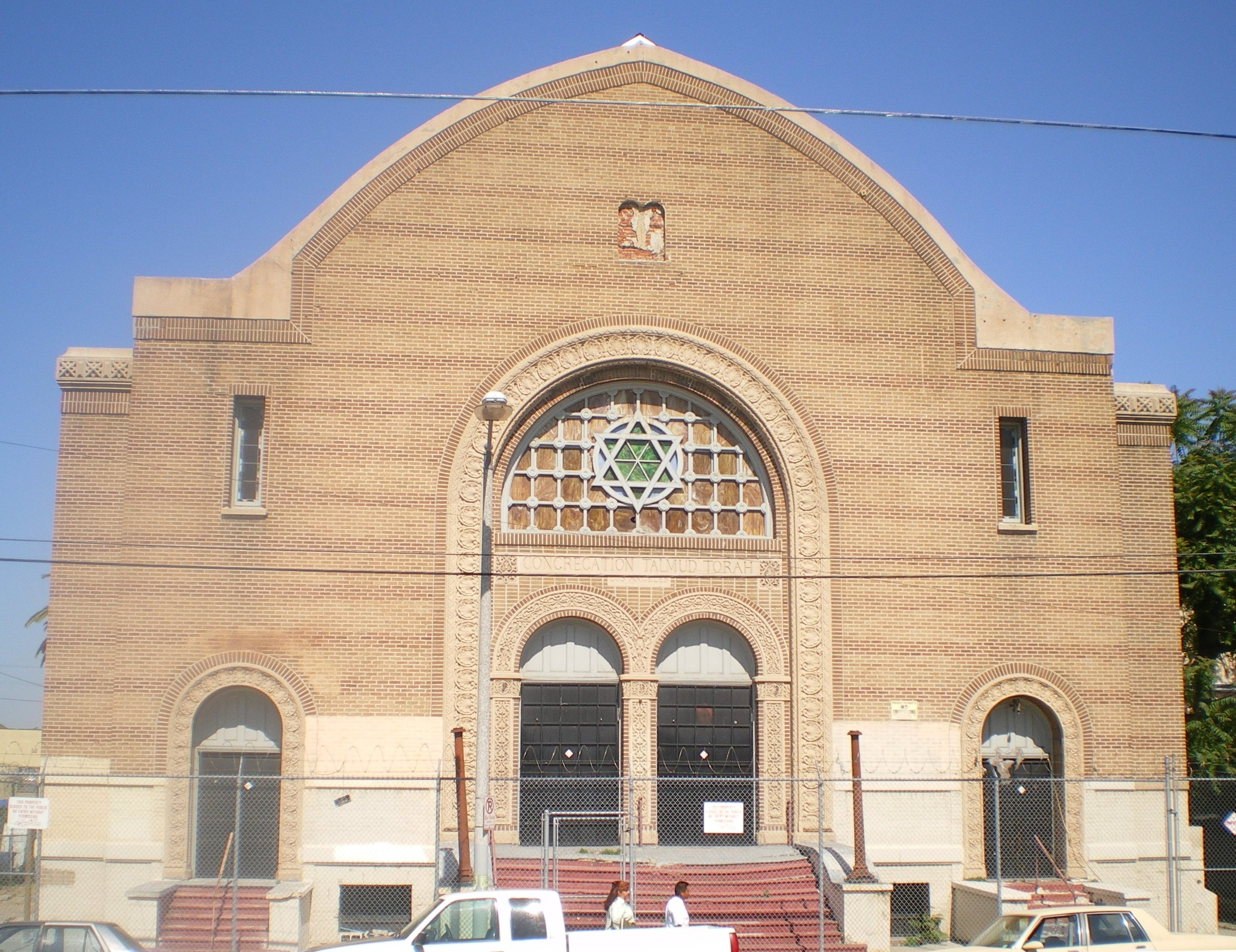
Breed Street Shul

- Majestic Theatre (1908), demolished 1933
- Los Angeles Fire Department Engine Company 24 Station No. 1 (1909)
- Blanchard Hall (1909)
- Breed Street Shul (1920–1923) (also with Archie C. Zimmerman), NRHP-listed, LAHCM No. 359
- First National Bank Building, Lemon Cove, California (1920)
- First National Bank of San Pedro (1920)
- Hillcrest Country Clubhouse (1921–1922)
