= 1943 Kentucky Derby =

Horse race

69th Kentucky Derby
- Kentucky Derby
- Grade I stakes race
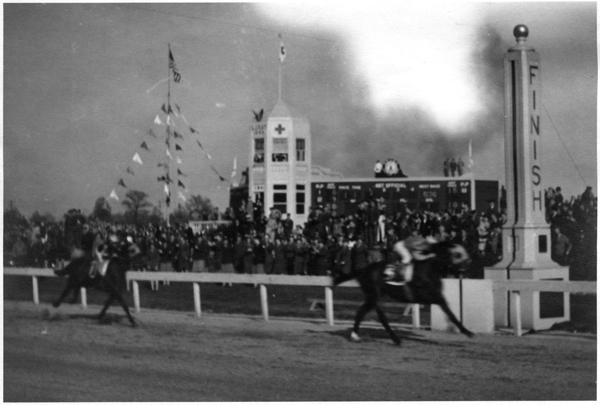
- Count Fleet winning the 1943 Kentucky Derby
- Location: Churchill Downs
- Date: May 1, 1943
- Winning horse: Count Fleet
- Winning time: 2:04 flat
- Jockey: Johnny Longden
- Trainer: Gregory Duncan Cameron
- Owner: Fannie Hertz
- Conditions: Fast
- Surface: Dirt
- Attendance: about 60,000

The 1943 Kentucky Derby, also known as the Street-car Derby, was the 69th running of the Kentucky Derby. The race took place on May 1, 1943, and was won by the heavy favorite, Count Fleet.

== Background ==
Colonel Matt Winn lobbied for the Kentucky Derby to be held in 1943 despite many restrictions related to the war effort. Instead, he promised to organize a "street-car Derby", where out-of-state patrons were not allowed to travel to Louisville, and locals had to use the street-car rather than drive to the track.

Count Fleet was the winter-book favorite for the Derby after being named the champion two-year-old colt of 1942. In April 1943, he easily won the Wood Memorial Stakes but injured himself during the race. That injury was considered the major obstacle to his winning the Derby. His major contenders were considered to be Ocean Wave, winner of the Blue Grass Stakes, and Blue Swords, second in the Wood Memorial.

== Race description ==
Despite the travel restrictions, a crowd of about 60,000 turned out for the Derby. A few hours before the race, Ocean Wave was scratched due to an injured leg, leaving Count Fleet as the 2-5 favorite – the shortest odds in Derby history. Count Fleet battled for the early lead with Gold Shower, then opened a two-length lead around the first turn and into the backstretch. On the far turn, Blue Swords closed to within a length before jockey Johnny Longden clucked to Count Fleet, who responded to win handily by three lengths.

== Full results ==
| Finished | Post | Horse | Jockey | Trainer | Owner | Time / behind |
|---|---|---|---|---|---|---|
| 1st | 5 | Count Fleet | Johnny Longden | Gregory Duncan Cameron | Fannie Hertz | 2:04 0/0 |
| 2nd | 1 | Blue Swords | Johnny Adams | Walter A. Kelley | Allen T. Simmons | 3 lengths |
| 3rd | 2 | Slide Rule | Conn McCreary | Cecil Wilhelm | William Boeing | 6 lengths |
| 4th | 7 | Amber Light | Alfred M. Robertson | Jack C. Hodgins | Dixiana | 5 lengths |
| 5th | 6 | Bankrupt | Ferril Zufelt | Howard Wells | Townsend B. Martin | 1/2 lengths |
| 6th | 10 | No Wrinkles | Raymond Adair | Roy Waldron | Milky Way Farm Stable | 1 1/2 lengths |
| 7th | 4 | Dove Pie | Wendell Eads | Dave Robb McDaniel | J. Warfield Rodgers | head |
| 8th | 9 | Gold Shower | Ted Atkinson | James W. Healy | Vera S. Bragg | 3 lengths |
| 9th | 3 | Modest Lad | Charles Swain | Eddie Coates | Mrs. Henry L. Finch | 10 lengths |
| 10th | 8 | Burnt Cork | Manual Gonzalez | Anthony E. Silver | Eddie Anderson | 8 lengths |

- Scratched: Ocean Wave, Twoses
- Winning breeder: Fannie Hertz (KY)
