= Eddie "Rochester" Anderson =

American actor and comedian (1905–1977)

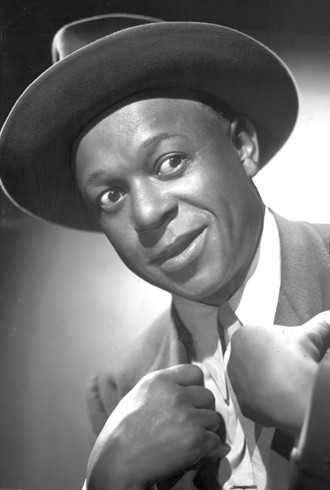
- Anderson c. 1947
- Born: Edmund Lincoln Anderson; September 18, 1905; Oakland, California, U.S.
- Died: February 28, 1977 (aged 71); Los Angeles, California, U.S.
- Resting place: Evergreen Cemetery, Los Angeles, California
- Other names: Eddie Anderson; Rochester
- Occupations: Actor; comedian
- Years active: 1919–1973
- Known for: Rochester Van Jones on The Jack Benny Program
- Spouses: Mamie Wiggins Nelson (m. 1939; died 1954) Eva Simon (m. 1956; div. 1973)
- Children: 4

Edmund Lincoln Anderson (September 18, 1905 – February 28, 1977) was an American actor and comedian known for his gravelly voice. To a generation of early radio and television comedy audiences, he was known as "Rochester".

Anderson entered show business as a teenager on the vaudeville circuit. In the early 1930s, he transitioned into films and radio. In 1937, he began his role of Rochester van Jones, usually known simply as Rochester, the valet of Jack Benny on the NBC radio show The Jack Benny Program. Anderson became the first African American to have a regular role on a nationwide radio program. When the series moved to CBS television in 1950, Anderson continued in the role until the series ended in 1965.

After the series ended, Anderson remained active with guest-starring roles on television and voice work in animated series. He was also an avid horse-racing fan who owned several race horses and worked as a horse trainer at the Hollywood Park Racetrack. He was married twice and had four children. He died of heart disease in February 1977 at the age of 71.

== Early life ==
Anderson was born in Oakland, California. His father, "Big Ed" Anderson, was a minstrel performer, while his mother Ella Mae had been a tightrope walker until her career was ended by a fall.

He described himself as a descendant of slaves who were able to leave the South during the Civil War through the Underground Railroad. At the age of 10, Anderson and his family moved from Oakland to San Francisco. He left school when he was 14 to work as an errand boy to help his family.

Stagestruck at an early age, he spent much of his free time waiting at stage doors and playing on street corners with his friend and brother, Cornelius. Anderson briefly tried being a jockey, but had to abandon it when he became too heavy. Anderson started in show business as part of an all-African-American revue at the age of 14; he had previously won an amateur contest at a vaudeville theater in San Francisco. Anderson joined the cast of Struttin' Along in 1923 and was part of Steppin' High both as a dancer and as one of the Three Black Aces with his brother Cornelius in 1924. He later worked in vaudeville with Cornelius. Anderson began adding comedy to his song-and-dance act in 1926. During one of his vaudeville tours to the East Coast, Anderson first met Jack Benny, but they only exchanged greetings and shook hands.

Anderson ruptured his vocal cords when he was a youngster selling newspapers in San Francisco, a job that required loud shouting. The permanent damage left him with his trademark gravelly voice. Anderson started in show business as a dancer, but it was his uniquely recognizable voice that brought him to stardom.

== Career ==
=== The Jack Benny Program ===
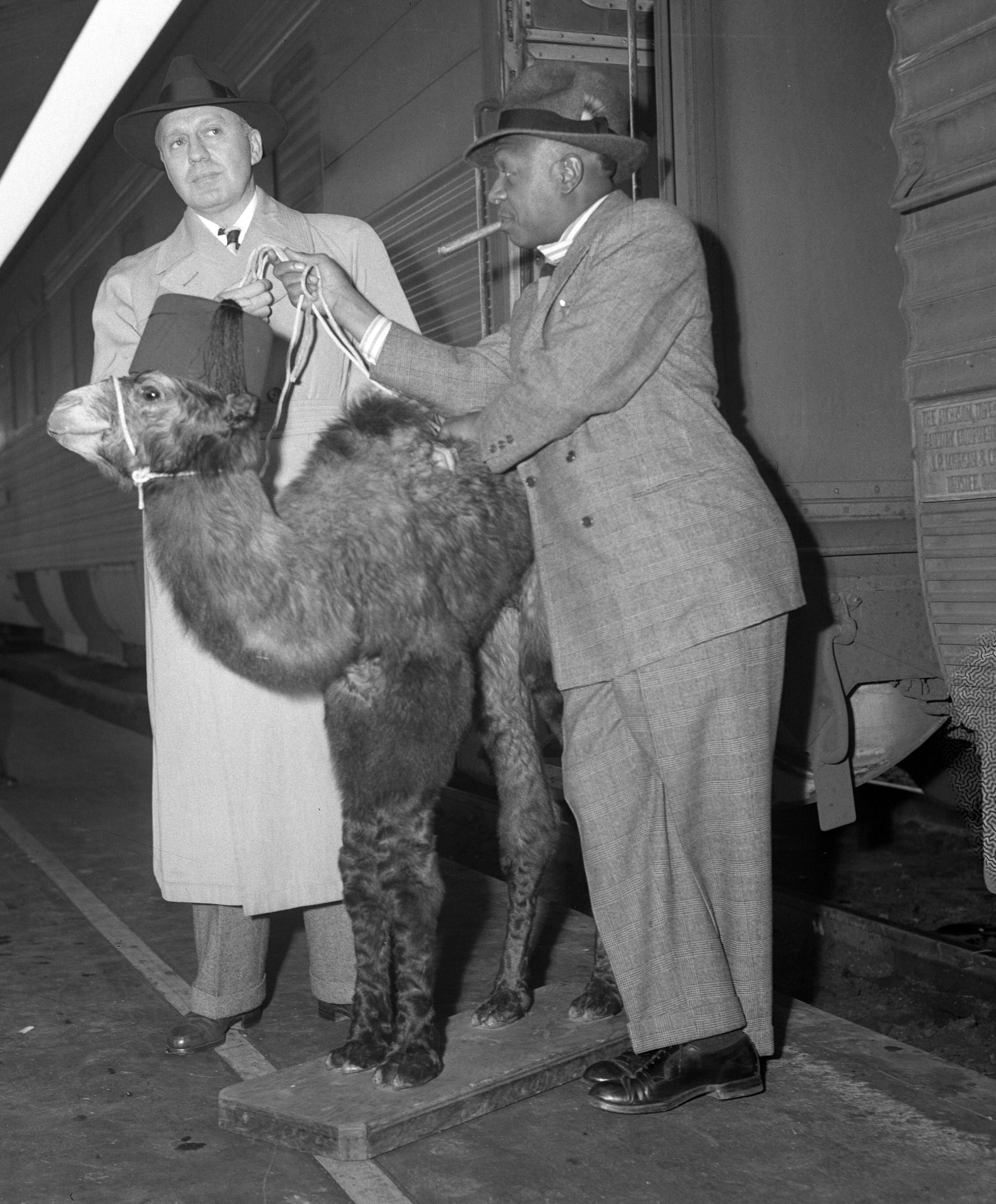
Jack Benny and Eddie Anderson disembark from a train in Los Angeles in 1943 with a camel.

Anderson's first appearance on The Jack Benny Program was on March 28, 1937. He was originally hired to play the one-time role of a redcap for a storyline in which the show traveled from Chicago to California by train, which coincided with the show's actual return to NBC's Radio City West in Hollywood after a brief stint in New York. Anderson, who was working as a comedian in Los Angeles, won the role after an audition.

Five weeks after Anderson's first appearance on the Benny program, he was called for another role on the show, this time as a waiter in a restaurant serving the cast. Several weeks later, Anderson was called back once again for the part of a man who had a financial disagreement with Benny.

After the show received many positive fan letters regarding Anderson's guest appearances, Benny invited him to join the cast as Rochester van Jones, the butler and valet for the fictionalized version of Benny. This job made Anderson the first African American with a regular role on a nationwide radio program. Anderson first appeared as Rochester on the program of June 20, 1937.

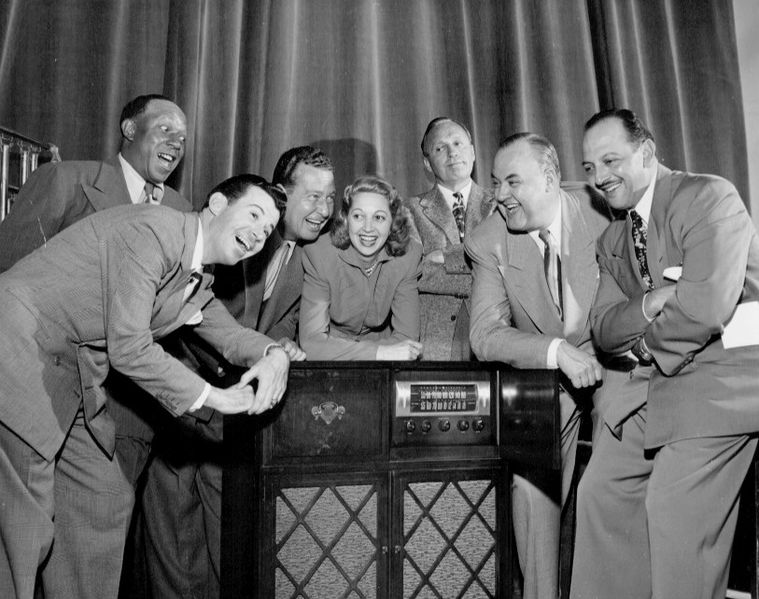
Most of the cast: Eddie Anderson, Dennis Day, Phil Harris, Mary Livingstone, Jack Benny, Don Wilson and Mel Blanc

Neither Benny nor Anderson could recall the origin of the name of Rochester for the character. Anderson always credited Benny, saying that the name was copyrighted and that Benny later sold the rights to him for a dollar. Several episodes offered origin stories for Rochester, including an Amos 'n' Andy backstory. A later television show explained that Benny met Rochester on a railroad train, with Benny responsible for Rochester being fired and then hiring him as a valet.

Benny became frustrated with Anderson's habitual tardiness and fined him $50 each time that he arrived late at the studio. Benny often asked cast members to check on Anderson, who frequently lost track of time, just before travel dates to ensure that he was ready, and occasionally the cast was forced to leave Anderson behind. In one incident, Anderson sped to the Pasadena train station with an LAPD motorcycle squad escort in order to catch his train.

==== Popularity ====
The Rochester character became immensely popular. In 1940, a riot ensued when Anderson's arrival at a Harvard University event was delayed by a prank by students from the rival Massachusetts Institute of Technology. Especially after World War II, Rochester was second only to Benny in popularity and frequently received the most enthusiastic applause. Although he was not normally involved in the opening minutes of the show, he began to surpass Mary Livingstone as Benny's main foil, especially as Livingstone's stage fright caused her to appear less frequently.

Benny's character and Rochester engaged in numerous running gags, often based on Rochester's attempts to evade work or to go to Central Avenue to drink or on Benny's business ventures or trademark frugality. In Rochester's early appearances, a running gag also involved his gambling habits, although this aspect of his character was considerably downplayed after World War II.

==== Mayor of Central Avenue ====
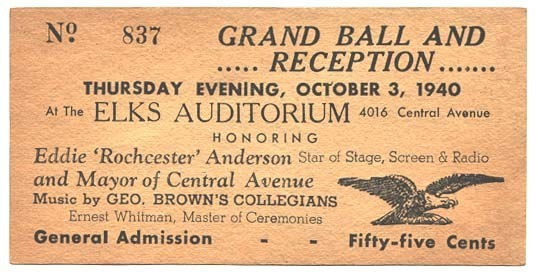
Ticket for Elks' Club reception for Anderson as Mayor of Central Avenue, 1940. The name ‘Rochester’ is misspelled.

Although Anderson was born and raised in the Oakland area, he came to the Los Angeles black community in the 1930s in search of film work. The people of the Central Avenue area would hold mock elections to name the "Mayor of Central Avenue," who had the right and the duty to advocate for the black community. In May 1940, Anderson launched a campaign for the post. From his headquarters at the Dunbar Hotel, Anderson conducted his campaign based mainly on real issues, such as advocacy for black military aviators. He took flying lessons and lectured with a Tuskegee Institute representative about the subject. Anderson won the election.

==== Progress in race relations ====
Anderson's role as a servant was common for black performers of that era, and the stereotyping of black characters had been standard practice in the entertainment business for many years, often in the form of minstrel shows in which white actors in blackface reinforced negative stereotypes. Benny had broadcast a radio minstrel show on November 1, 1936, with the cast performing in dialect but revisited the subject for a March 29, 1942, show that evinced a great deal of progress in race relations.

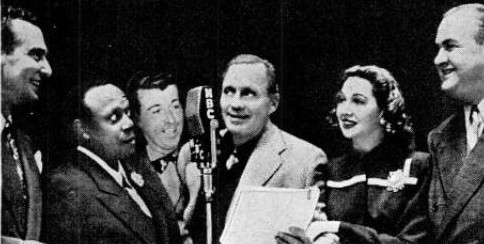
Anderson with Jack Benny radio show cast, 1946

According to Benny's posthumous autobiography Sunday Nights at Seven, the amount of racial humor regarding Rochester lessened following World War II after the enormity of the Holocaust was revealed. Benny and his writers initiated a conscious effort to remove all stereotypical aspects from the Rochester character. When a rehashed 1940 script was used for a February 1950 show that included several black stereotypes, some listeners sent angry letters in protest. Thereafter, Benny insisted that his writers guarantee that no racial jokes or references should be heard on his show. Benny often afforded key guest-star appearances to African American performers such as Louis Armstrong and the Ink Spots, and Benny made numerous personal appeals on his show asking listeners to reject racism in favor of fraternity and peaceful racial relations.

The relationship between Rochester and Benny became more complex and familiar as the popularity of Rochester's character grew, with Rochester's role becoming less stereotypical and subservient. However, as a butler, the character remained subservient to the entire cast and was always called Rochester, but he addressed the other characters with formal titles. Although some of the humor remained stereotypical, the racial element of the jokes would emanate from Rochester only.

During World War II, Benny toured with his show, but Anderson did not participate because racial segregation in the armed forces would have required separate living quarters. However, during performances staged before military audiences at bases and military hospitals, Rochester routinely drew enthusiastic applause. In 1943, when Benny brought his show to Canada to perform for Canadian forces, Anderson and his wife received a warm welcome.

Benny recounted an incident in his autobiography in which he rebuked an American soldier who had expressed bigotry toward Anderson. Benny was also reported to have threatened to move his entire company from a Saint Joseph, Missouri, hotel that denied lodging to Anderson. The hotel relented and allowed Anderson to remain as a guest. A similar incident occurred in New York, where a hotel manager attempted to relocate Anderson after a couple from the South complained about staying in the same hotel with him. Benny replied by removing his entire cast and crew of 44 from the hotel in a show of solidarity with Anderson.

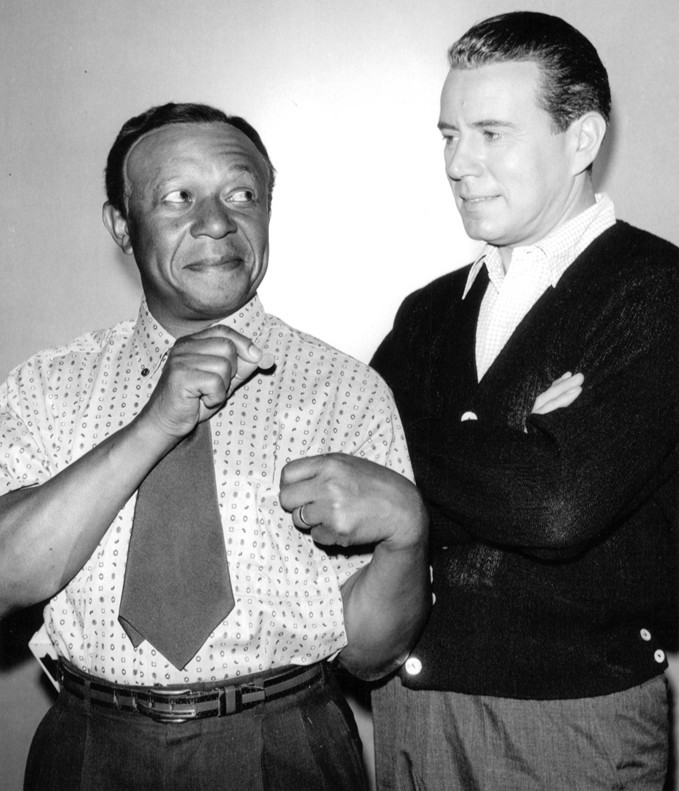
Anderson, as Rochester, demonstrates to John Forsythe how Benny pinches a penny on Bachelor Father, 1962.

Among the most highly paid performers of his time, Anderson invested wisely and became wealthy. Until the 1950s, Anderson was the highest paid African American actor, earning an annual salary of $100,000. In 1962, Anderson reached Ebony magazine's list of the 100 wealthiest African Americans. Despite this success, he was so strongly identified with the Rochester role that many mistakenly believed that he was Benny's actual valet. Anderson's frequent visits to Benny's home may have helped perpetuate the myth, as Benny held weekly cast rehearsals at his private residence in Beverly Hills. One listener, after hearing Rochester's jokes about his low salary, sent Benny a scolding letter and then sent another to Anderson urging him to sue Benny.

When Benny brought his show to television in 1950, Anderson remained part of the cast until the show left the air after the 1964–1965 season. Anderson appeared as Rochester in a 1953 episode of The Milton Berle Show and a 1962 episode of Bachelor Father.

During a February 1958 taping of a Shower of Stars special to celebrate Benny's "40th birthday," Anderson suffered a mild heart attack. A Life magazine photo after the incident showed Benny's concern for Anderson. After Benny's show left the airwaves, it was four years before the two men worked together again, but they remained in contact with each other. Anderson said, "We always exchange Christmas gifts and he's not as stingy as he pretends to be."

Anderson appeared as Rochester in Benny's 1968 special Jack Benny's Bag. The following year, he appeared in the special Jack Benny's New Look.

Upon Benny's death in 1974, Anderson tearfully spoke of Benny with admiration and respect.

=== Films ===
Anderson's film career began with George Cukor's What Price Hollywood? (1932) as a butler, and he appeared in many Hollywood films through the 1930s and 1940s. Anderson appeared on screen with Benny for the first time in Man About Town (1939). They appeared in several other feature films, including Buck Benny Rides Again (1940).

In addition to his role with Benny, Anderson appeared in more than 60 films including The Green Pastures (1936) as Noah, Jezebel (1938) as Gros Bat, Capra's You Can't Take It with You (1938) as Donald and Gone with the Wind (1939) as Uncle Peter. He reprised his Rochester role in Topper Returns (1941). He had a rare leading role in the all-star black Hollywood musical Cabin in the Sky (1943) as Joseph 'Little Joe' Jackson. He also starred in Brewster's Millions (1945), which was banned in some Southern areas. For example, censors in Memphis said that Anderson "has an important role and has too familiar a way about him" and lamented that the film "presents too much social equality and racial mixture."

Anderson, Benny and the remaining cast members of The Jack Benny Program (Mary Livingstone, Don Wilson, and Mel Blanc) also provided their voices to the Warner Bros. cartoon The Mouse that Jack Built (1959). Anderson's last significant feature-film performance was as a taxi driver in Stanley Kramer's comedy It's a Mad, Mad, Mad, Mad World (1963), in which Benny made a cameo appearance (although the two did not appear together). Anderson was inducted into the Black Filmmakers Hall of Fame in 1975.

=== Other performances ===
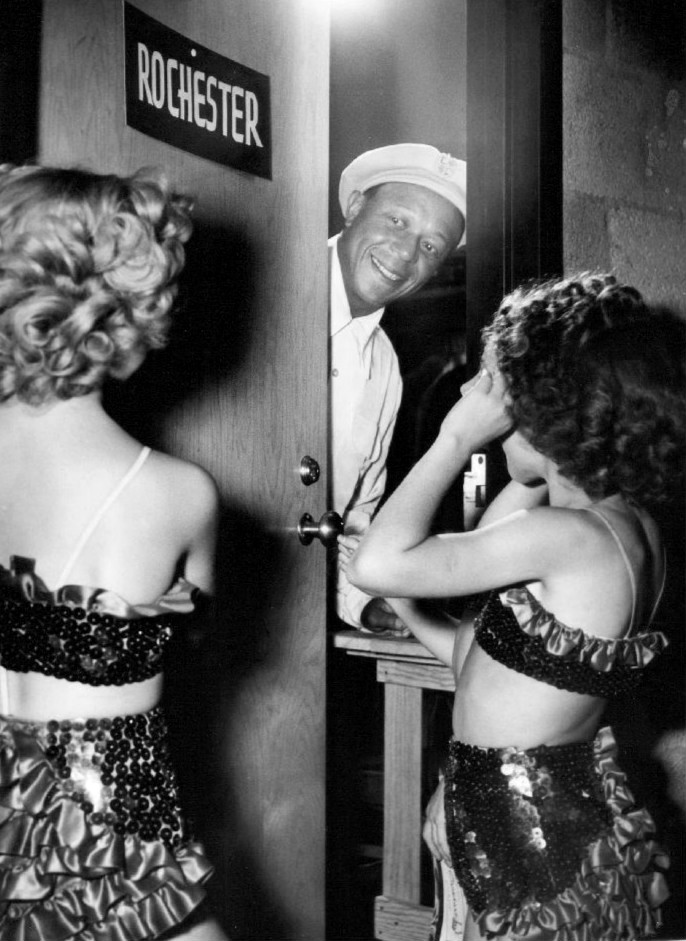
Anderson greets two visitors at his dressing-room door.

Anderson appeared as a mystery guest on the television game show What's My Line? in 1952. As the panel was blindfolded, Dorothy Kilgallen's question "Are you brunette?" brought a roar of laughter from the audience, and Anderson laughed so hard that he was not able to reply to the question. In 1957, Hallmark Hall of Fame presented The Green Pastures, affording Anderson the chance to reprise his film role as Noah on television, and the program was nominated for an Emmy Award.

Anderson also appeared on episodes of The Dick Powell Show, It Takes a Thief and Love, American Style. In the early 1970s, Anderson provided the voice for cartoon character Bobby Joe Mason in Harlem Globetrotters and The New Scooby-Doo Movies. By 1972, he attempted a comeback with a nightclub act in Houston that led to a role in the Broadway revival of Good News, but he was forced to resign because of his failing health.

== Other business ventures ==
Anderson opened a nightclub in the Central Avenue section of Los Angeles, but it did not survive long because of his excessive generosity with friends who frequented the club.

During World War II, Anderson financed and owned the Pacific Parachute Company, founded by Howard "Skippy" Smith, it was an African-American owned-and-operated business that made parachutes for the Army and Navy. He also managed boxer Billy Metcalfe in the 1940s.

Anderson had an astute business sense, and in 1948, he saw the value and potential of Las Vegas as an entertainment center. However, his idea to build and operate a black-friendly hotel and casino there failed when he could not attract enough investors. When he appeared at the opening of the racially integrated Moulin Rouge Hotel in 1955, Anderson expressed regret about his failed venture.

== Personal life ==
=== Marriages and children ===
On May 2, 1939, Anderson married Mamie (née Wiggins) Nelson of Georgia. Mamie died on August 5, 1954, at the age of 43 following two years of suffering with cancer. Her son Billy from a previous marriage played professional football for the Chicago Bears and adopted Anderson's surname when his mother remarried.

Following Mamie's death, Anderson married Evangela "Eva" Simon on February 8, 1956, in Kingman, Arizona. The couple had three children: daughters Stephanie and Evangela Jr. ("Eva") and son Edmund Jr. When the couple divorced in 1973, Anderson retained custody of his minor son and daughter.

=== Home ===
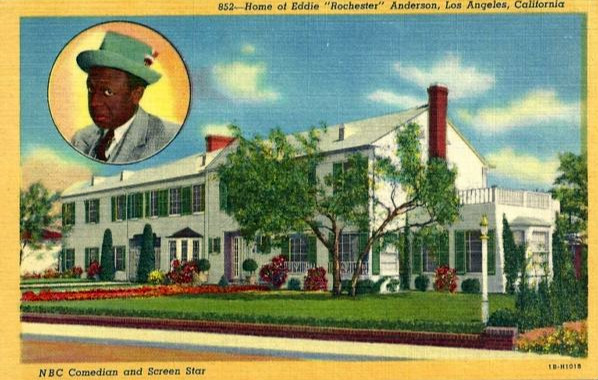
Postcard view of Anderson's home, c.1940s

Like many African Americans in the entertainment industry, Anderson lived in the West Adams district of Los Angeles. In previous times, the district had been home to doctors, lawyers and railroad barons, but in the Depression era, the area had deteriorated, with many residents needing to sell their homes or rent rooms in them. By the 1940s, the black entertainment community began purchasing homes in the district, nicknaming it Sugar Hill. Some property owners reacted to their new neighbors by adding restrictive covenants to their deeds that either prohibited blacks from purchasing property or inhabiting property that had been purchased. The practice was declared illegal by the U.S. Supreme Court in 1948.

Anderson wanted to build a home designed by Paul Williams but he was limited in his choice of site by these restrictive covenants. As a result, his large and luxurious home with a swimming pool stands in an area of smaller, bungalow-style homes. The street was renamed after the Rochester character.

=== Politics ===
Anderson supported the candidacy of Ronald Reagan in the 1966 California gubernatorial election.

=== Hobbies ===
Anderson built model airplanes and racing cars, but also designed a life-size sportscar for himself in 1951. Anderson combined a Cadillac engine under the hood with a sleek, low-slung exterior to create a car that he exhibited at sportscar shows throughout the country.

Anderson, who was the skipper of his own cabin cruiser, was missing and feared lost at sea in February 1946. When the boat developed engine trouble, Anderson and his two friends signaled an SOS with mirrors, fires, lanterns and with the ship's flag turned upside-down to indicate distress. They spent the night adrift until a fishing boat finally spotted them and towed them into the Los Angeles harbor. Anderson did not realize that he had caused great concern until he heard a radio news story about the search for him.

==== Horse racing ====
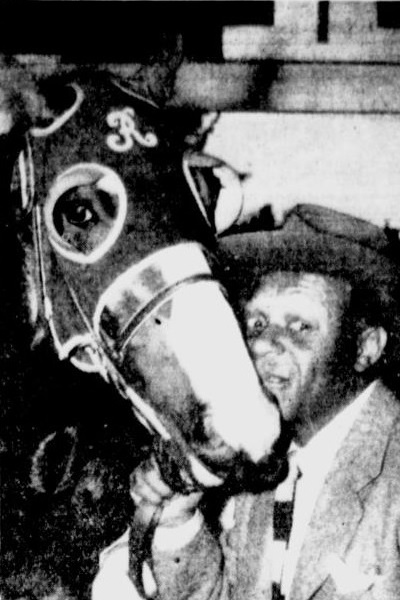
Anderson with Burnt Cork before his Kentucky Derby run in 1943

Anderson owned racehorses, including Burnt Cork, a Thoroughbred that ran in the 1943 Kentucky Derby, making Anderson the first African-American owner of a horse entered into the Derby. However, as racial segregation was practiced in Louisville, Kentucky, Anderson and his wife lodged with black politician Mae Street Kidd while in the city to watch the race.

Both before and after the race, Anderson was accused of entering his horse in the race strictly for publicity purposes, especially after Burnt Cork finished last. However, United Press International sports columnist Jack Cuddy noted that King George VI's horse Tipstaff finished last at Ascot without any of the type of comments that surrounded Anderson.

When Burnt Cork won an important race, Anderson arrived at Metro-Goldwyn-Mayer for work dressed as a Kentucky colonel; he also insisted on being called "Colonel Rochester."

After the Benny television show had left the air, Anderson returned to his love of horse racing, working as a trainer at the Hollywood Park Racetrack until shortly before his death. When a horse named Up and Over became injured and was nearly euthanized, Anderson spent extensive periods of time at the Paramount Pictures studio library reading about equine anatomy. This led him to a veterinary surgeon who assisted in rehabilitating the horse.

== Death ==
Anderson died of heart disease on February 28, 1977, at the Motion Picture & Television Country House and Hospital in Los Angeles. He was buried at the historic Evergreen Cemetery, the oldest existing cemetery in Los Angeles.

== Legacy ==
In a final philanthropic gesture, Anderson willed his sizable home for the benefit of victims of substance abuse. The Rochester House continues to help troubled men transition into society and provide shelter for homeless drug abusers. It opened several neighboring properties in 1989.

Anderson's son Eddie Jr. later established The Eddie "Rochester" Anderson Foundation.

For his contribution to the radio industry, Anderson has a star on the Hollywood Walk of Fame for Radio at 6513 Hollywood Blvd. in Hollywood. In 2001, Anderson was posthumously inducted into the Radio Hall of Fame.

== Filmography ==
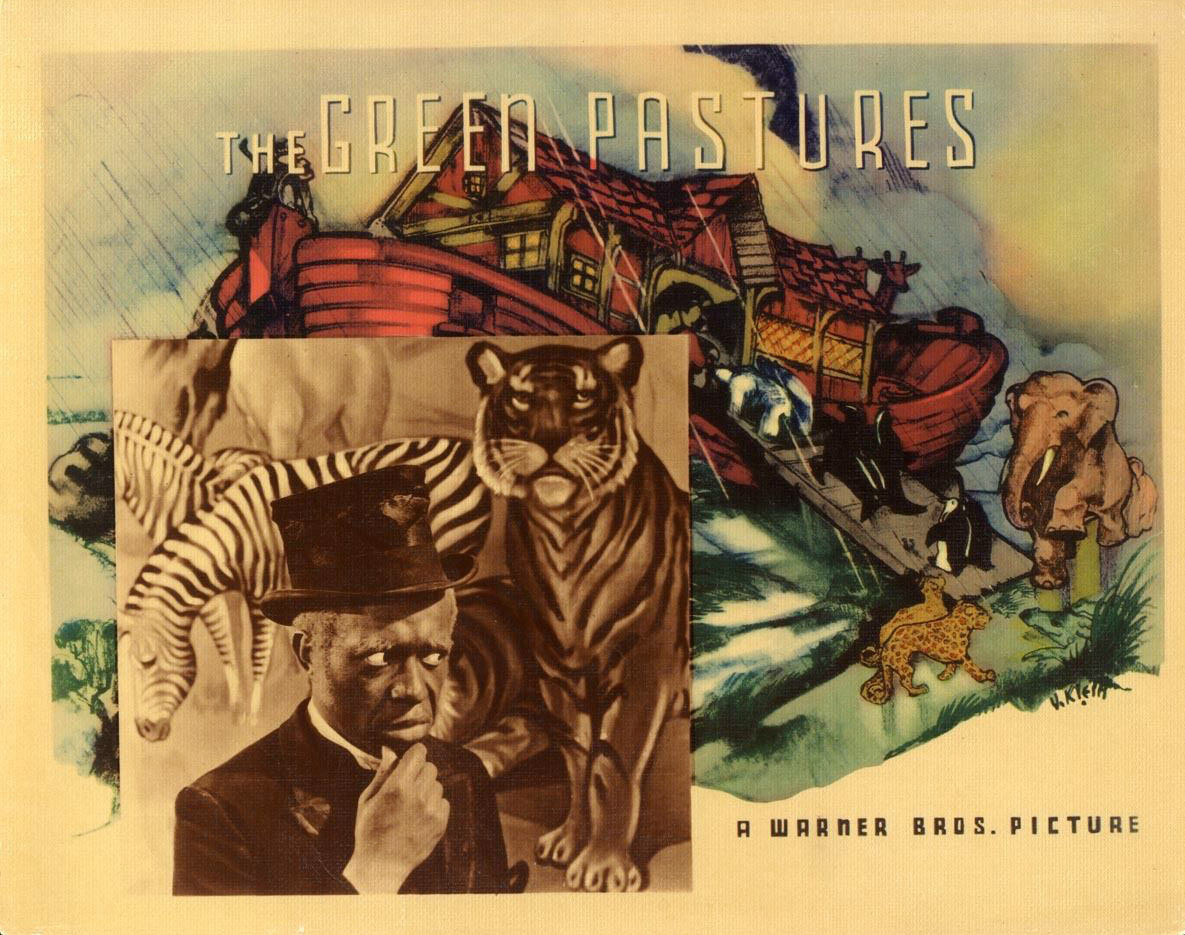
Lobby card depicting Anderson as Noah in The Green Pastures (1936)

Year	Title	Role	Notes
1932	What Price Hollywood?	James – Max's Butler	Uncredited
1932	Hat Check Girl	Walter	Uncredited
1932	False Faces	Chauffeur	Uncredited
1933	The Billion Dollar Scandal	Railroad Steward	Uncredited
1933	From Hell to Heaven	Sam's Pal	Uncredited
1933	Terror Aboard	Seaman	Uncredited
1933	I Love That Man	Charlie, Porter	Uncredited
1934	Behold My Wife	Chauffeur	Uncredited
1934	The Gay Bride	Second Bootblack	Uncredited
1935	Transient Lady	Noxious	
1935	His Night Out	Bellhop	Uncredited
1936	The Music Goes 'Round	Lucifer	
1936	Show Boat	Young Black Man	Uncredited
1936	The Green Pastures	Noah	
1936	Star for a Night	Maid's Boyfriend	Uncredited
1936	Two in a Crowd	Swipe	Uncredited
1936	Three Men on a Horse	Moses, the Elevator Operator	
1936	Rainbow on the River	Doctor	Uncredited
1936	Mysterious Crossing	Hotel Porter	Uncredited
1937	Love Is News	Man Getting Marriage License	Uncredited
1937	Bill Cracks Down	Chauffeur	
1937	When Love Is Young	Taxi Driver	Uncredited
1937	Melody for Two	Exodus Johnson	
1937	Public Wedding	Man Carrying Coat	Uncredited
1937	White Bondage	Old Glory	Uncredited
1937	Wake Up and Live	Elevator Operator	Uncredited
1937	Reported Missing!	Porter	Uncredited
1937	One Mile from Heaven	Henry Bangs	
1937	On Such a Night	Henry Clay, Fentridge Handyman	
1937	Over the Goal	William	
1938	Reckless Living	Dreamboat	
1938	Jezebel	Gros Bat	
1938	Gold Diggers in Paris	Doorman	
1938	You Can't Take It With You	Donald	
1938	Five of a Kind	Hotel Doorman	Uncredited
1938	Exposed	William	
1938	Thanks for the Memory	Janitor	
1938	Strange Faces	William	
1938	While New York Sleeps	Janitor	Uncredited
1938	Kentucky	Groom	
1938	Going Places	George – a Groom	
1939	Honolulu	Washington, Mason's Hollywood Servant	
1939	You Can't Cheat an Honest Man	Rochester	
1939	You Can't Get Away with Murder	Sam	Uncredited
1939	Man About Town	Rochester	
1939	Gone With the Wind	Uncle Peter – Pittypat's Coachman	
1940	Buck Benny Rides Again	Rochester Van Jones	
1940	Love Thy Neighbor	Rochester Van Jones	
1941	Topper Returns	Chauffeur	
1941	Kiss the Boys Goodbye	George	
1941	Birth of the Blues	Louey	Credited as Rochester
1942	Tales of Manhattan	Rev. Lazarus	
1942	Star Spangled Rhythm	Rochester in "Sharp as a Tack" Number	Credited as Rochester
1943	The Meanest Man in the World	Shufro	
1943	Cabin in the Sky	Little Joe Jackson	
1943	Calling All Kids	Buckwheat	Voice, Short film
1943	What's Buzzin', Cousin?	Rochester	
1944	Broadway Rhythm	Eddie	
1945	Brewster's Millions	Jackson	
1945	I Love a Bandleader	Newton H. Newton	Credited as Rochester
1945	The Sailor Takes a Wife	Harry	
1946	The Show-Off	Eddie	
1959	The Mouse That Jack Built	Rochester	Voice, Credited as Rochester
1963	It's a Mad, Mad, Mad, Mad World	Cab Driver	

Television
Year	Title	Role	Notes
1950–1965	The Jack Benny Program	Rochester Van Jones	176 episodes
1952	What's My Line?	Himself / Rochester	Mystery Guest
1957	The Red Skelton Hour	Rochester Van Jones	Episode: " Freddie Finds a Headlight"
1957	Hallmark Hall of Fame	Noah	Episode: "The Green Pastures"
1959	The Green Pastures	Noah	Television film
1962	Bachelor Father	Rochester Van Jones	Segment: "Pinch That Penny"
1963	The Dick Powell Show	Eddie Anderson	Episode: "Last of the Private Eyes"
1968	It Takes a Thief	Concierge	Episode: "A Thief Is a Thief"
1969	Love, American Style	Willie	Segment: "Love and the Hustler"
1970	Harlem Globetrotters	Bobby Joe Mason	Voice, 22 episodes
1972–1973	The New Scooby-Doo Movies	Bobby Joe Mason	Voice, 3 episodes

== Footnotes ==
=== Works cited ===
- Bogle, Donald (2009). Bright Boulevards, Bold Dreams: The Story of Black Hollywood. Random House. ISBN 978-0-307-51493-6.
- Bolus, Jim (1998). Kentucky Derby Stories. Pelican Publishing. ISBN 978-1-56554-465-9.
- Boskin, Joseph (1988). Sambo: The Rise and Demise of an American Jester. Oxford University Press. ISBN 978-0-195-36353-1.
- Gates, Henry Louis Jr. (2009). Harlem Renaissance Lives. Oxford University Press. ISBN 978-0-19-538795-7.
- Keister, Douglas (2010). Forever L.A.: A Field Guide To Los Angeles Area Cemeteries & Their Residents. Gibbs Smith. ISBN 978-1-42361-653-5.
- Nachman, Gerald (2012). Raised on Radio. Random House. ISBN 978-0-30782-894-1.
- Pacheco, Manny (2009). Forgotten Hollywood Forgotten History. Book Publishers Network. ISBN 978-1-93535-916-6.
- Peterson, Bernard L. (2001). Profiles of African American Stage Performers and Theatre People, 1816–1960. Greenwood Publishing Group. ISBN 978-0-31329-534-8.
- Sampson, Henry T. (2013). Blacks in Blackface: A Sourcebook on Early Black Musical Shows. Scarecrow Publishing. ISBN 978-081088-351-2.
- Smith, R. J. (2006). The Great Black Way: L.A. In the 1940s and The Lost African-American Renaissance. Public Affairs. ISBN 978-158648-295-4.
