= Sunday Nights at Seven =

1990 biography by Jack and Joan Benny

Sunday Nights at Seven: The Jack Benny Story
- Author: Jack Benny, Joan Benny
- Language: English
- Publisher: Warner Books
- Publication date: November 1990
- Publication place: New York, USA
- Media type: Print
- Pages: 302
- ISBN: 0-446-51546-9

Sunday Nights at Seven: The Jack Benny Story is a biography of comedian Jack Benny written both by himself and his daughter Joan Benny. It was published in November 1990 and includes a foreword by George Burns.

== Summary ==
Burns' foreword calls Jack Benny his "best friend", provides some background on their relationship and describes his thoughts about the publication of a new biography. This is followed by an introduction in which Joan Benny recounts finding the manuscript of her father's autobiography in 1984, years after his death, which he had apparently been writing in the late 1960s, but which remained unpublished possibly because of his wife objecting to material on his "former girlfriends". Joan Benny goes on to describe her father's importance to her and how she arrived at the decision to publish a book which combined the manuscript she had found with her own reminiscences.

The rest of the book alternates between passages by Joan Benny and excerpts from the manuscript. It covers the entirety of Jack Benny's life, though his own contributions do not extend past 1965. His daughter's additions fill in the gaps and focus on both her own memories and stories she has collected from others who knew her father, including George Burns, Mel Blanc and his wife Estelle, George Balzer, Goodman Ace, Abbe Lane, Irving Fein, Leonard Gershe, Claudette Colbert, Isaac Stern and other friends and employees of the Benny family. There are also sections focusing on her mother Mary Livingstone and two collections of black-and-white photographs.

== Reviews ==
Publishers Weekly calls Jack Benny's parts of the book "entertaining and moving", while his daughter's additions are described as "interesting if repetitious". The review takes particular note of her criticisms of her mother. Kirkus Reviews says that "Joan's intimate view never grows wearisome" and praises her father's entertaining delivery. The glimpses of Jack Benny "at work" are singled out for praise. In The Saturday Evening Post, Maynard Good Stoddard says Jack Benny's portion is "complete, fascinating, often hilarious", while also enjoying Joan Benny's candor and her "skillfully blended" variety of anecdotes about her "very special childhood".

Gary Giddins, writing for the Los Angeles Times, highlights Jack Benny's attempts to explain what made his shows "unique institutions in the cultural life of this century". He says fans will enjoy the book, but then calls it "a disappointment", pointing out that much of the nearly 400 page manuscript was omitted, important coworkers go unmentioned and certain issues are glossed over. He is also dismissive of the sections by Joan Benny, "a pedestrian writer" who "writes at length about herself". He is more interested in her discussion of the tense relationship with her mother, which, he says, "triggers more emotion than the almost unsullied adoration of Daddy". His criticisms of the book's omissions and overfocus on Joan Benny are echoed in reviews by Richard Dyer and Tom Wellman, but they join the others in praising Jack Benny's contributions.
