= Jack Benny =

American comedic entertainer (1894–1974)

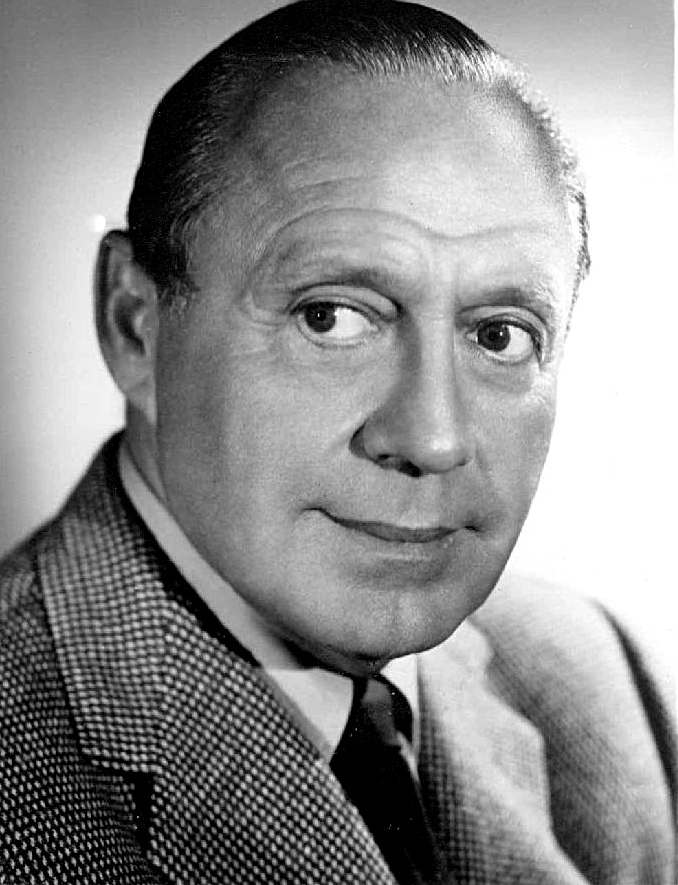
- Benny in 1964
- Born: Benjamin Kubelsky; February 14, 1894; Chicago, Illinois U.S.
- Died: December 26, 1974 (aged 80); Los Angeles, California, U.S.
- Resting place: Hillside Memorial Park Cemetery
- Occupations: Actor; comedian; vaudevillian; violinist
- Years active: 1911–1974
- Known for: The Jack Benny Program
- Spouse: Mary Livingstone (m. 1927)
- Children: 1
- Relatives: Robert F. Blumofe (son-in-law); Robert Blumofe (grandson)
- Awards: Golden Globe for Best TV Show (1958); Primetime Emmy Award for Outstanding Lead Actor in a Comedy Series (1957, 1959); more
- Military career
- Allegiance: United States
- Branch: United States Navy
- Service years: 1918-1921
- Rank: Seaman First Class
- Conflicts: World War I
- Awards: World War I Victory Medal

Jack Benny (born Benjamin Kubelsky; February 14, 1894 – December 26, 1974) was an American entertainer who evolved from a modest success as a violinist on the vaudeville circuit to one of the leading entertainers of the twentieth century with a highly popular comedic career in radio, television, and film.

His radio and television programs, popular from 1932 until his death in 1974, were a major influence on the sitcom genre. Benny, with self-deprecating humor, portrayed himself as a vain miser who obliviously played his violin badly and perpetually claimed to be 39 years of age. He was known for his comic timing and the ability to cause laughter with a long pause or a single expression, such as his signature exasperated summation "Well! "

Benny's most successful show The Jack Benny Program started in 1932 as a radio program and ended in 1965 as a television show, often regarded as a high-water mark in 20th-century American comedy. He also played many leading roles in films, particularly in the 1930s and 1940s, including Charley's Aunt, George Washington Slept Here and the film classic To Be or Not to Be.

== Early life ==
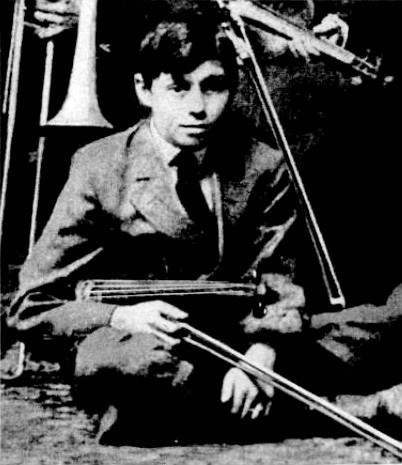
Benny in the Waukegan High School band, 1909

Benny was born Benjamin Kubelsky (Yiddish: בנימין קובעלסקי) on February 14, 1894 in Chicago, and grew up in nearby Waukegan. He was the son of Jewish immigrants Meyer Kubelsky and Naomi Emma (née Sachs) who both immigrated to the United States from the Russian Empire. Meyer was a saloon owner and later a haberdasher who had emigrated to the United States from Congress Poland (then part of the Russian Empire) and Emma (Yiddish: עמאַ קובעלסקי), a Lithuanian Jewish woman was also from the Russian Empire. His parents gave him a half-size violin for his sixth birthday in 1900 and he started taking violin lessons from Professor Harlow in Waukegan, who charged 50 cents per lesson. Considered a prodigy, by the age of 8 Benny was making frequent trips to Chicago with his mother to study under Hugo Kortschak at the Chicago Musical College. He loved the instrument but hated to practice. Another one of his music teachers was Otto Graham Sr., a neighbor and father of football player Otto Graham. At 14, Benny was playing in dance bands and his high school orchestra. He was a dreamer, and poor at his studies, ultimately dropping out of school and music lessons in the 9th grade. He later did poorly in business school and in attempts to join his father's business. In 1911, he began playing the violin in local vaudeville theaters for US$7.50 a week ($259.00 in 2025). He was joined on the circuit by Ned Miller, a young composer and singer.

That same year, Benny was playing in the same theater as the young Marx Brothers. Minnie, their mother, enjoyed Benny's violin playing and invited him to accompany her boys in their act. Benny's parents refused to let their son go on the road at 17, but it was the beginning of his long friendship with the Marx Brothers, especially Zeppo Marx.

The next year, Benny formed a vaudeville musical duo with pianist Cora Folsom Salisbury, who needed a partner for her act. This angered famous violinist Jan Kubelik, who feared that the young vaudevillian with a similar name would damage his reputation. Under legal pressure, Benjamin Kubelsky agreed to change his name to Ben K. Benny, sometimes spelled Bennie. When Salisbury left the act, Benny found a new pianist, Lyman Woods, and renamed the act "From Grand Opera to Ragtime". They worked together for five years and slowly integrated comedy elements into the show. They reached the Palace Theater and did not do well.

Benny left show business briefly in 1918 to join the United States Navy during World War I, often entertaining fellow sailors with his violin playing. One evening, his violin performance was booed by the sailors, so with prompting from fellow sailor and actor Pat O'Brien, he ad-libbed his way out of the jam and left them laughing. He received more comedy spots in the revues and did well, earning a reputation as a comedian and musician. Despite stories to the contrary, no reliable evidence indicates Jack Benny was aboard during the 1915 Eastland disaster or scheduled to be on the excursion; possibly the basis for this report was that Eastland was a training vessel during World War I and Benny received his training in the Great Lakes naval base where Eastland was stationed. Benny achieved the rank of Seaman First Class. His naval service ended in 1921.

Shortly after the war, Benny developed a one-man act, "Ben K. Benny: Fiddle Funology". He then received legal pressure from Ben Bernie, a "patter-and-fiddle" performer, regarding his name, so he adopted the sailor's nickname of Jack. By 1921, the fiddle was more of a prop, and the low-key comedy took over.

Benny had some romantic encounters, including one with dancer Mary Kelly, whose devoutly Catholic family forced her to turn down his proposal because he was Jewish. Benny was introduced to Kelly by Gracie Allen.

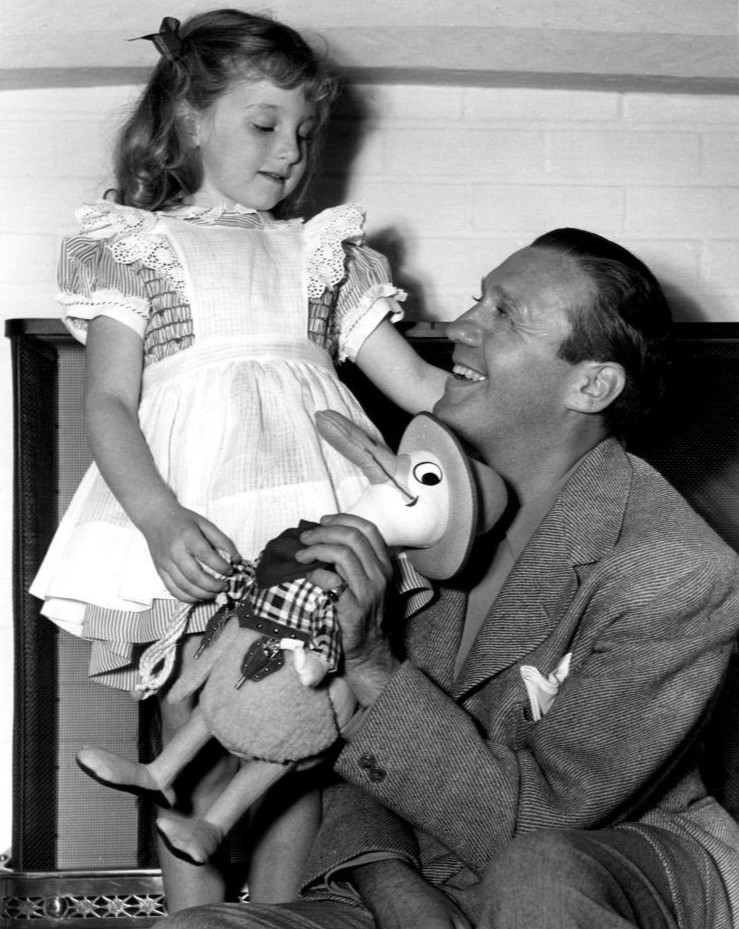
Benny and daughter Joan in 1940

In 1922, Benny accompanied Zeppo Marx to a Passover Seder in Vancouver at the residence where he met 17-year-old Sadie Marks (whose family was friends with, but not related to, the Marx family). Their first meeting did not go well when he tried to leave during Sadie's violin performance. They met again in 1926. Jack had not remembered their earlier meeting and was immediately taken with her. They married the following year. She was working in the hosiery section of the downtown LA Broadway Boulevard May Company, this was across the street from the Orpheum Theater. Jack was playing at the theater. Called on to fill in for the "dumb girl" part in a Benny routine, Sadie proved to be a natural comedienne. Adopting the stage name Mary Livingstone, Sadie collaborated with Benny throughout most of his career. They later adopted a daughter, Joan (1934–2021). Sadie's older sister Babe would often be the target of jokes about unattractive or masculine women, while her younger brother Hilliard would later produce Benny's radio and TV work.

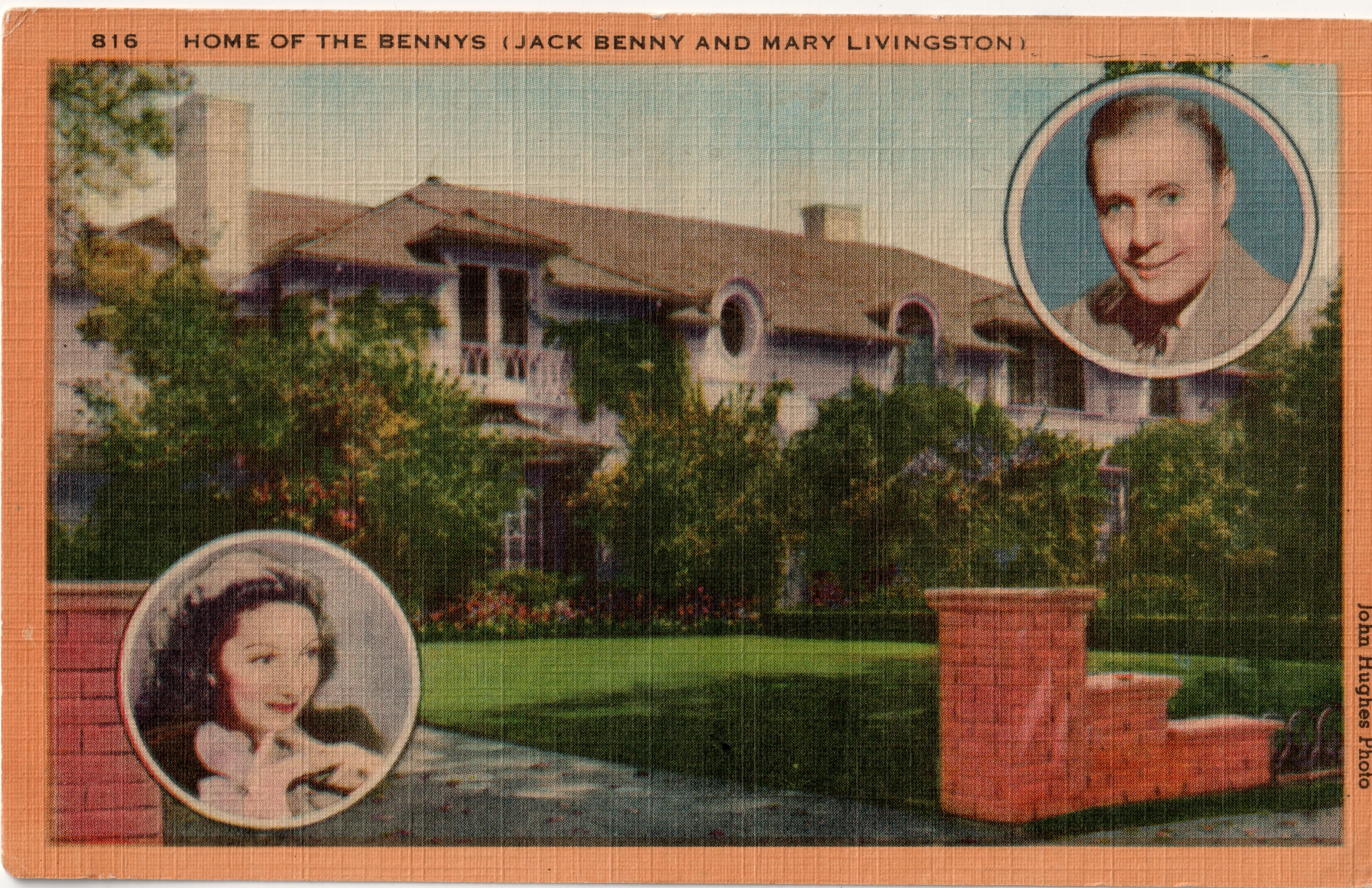
Home of Jack Benny and Mary Livingston

In 1929, Benny's agent, Sam Lyons, convinced Irving Thalberg, American film producer at Metro-Goldwyn-Mayer, to watch Benny at the Orpheum Theatre in Los Angeles. Benny signed a five-year contract with MGM, where his first role was in The Hollywood Revue of 1929. The next film, Chasing Rainbows, did not do well, and after several months Benny was released from his contract and returned to Broadway in Earl Carroll's Vanities. At first dubious about the viability of radio, Benny grew eager to break into the new medium. In 1932, after a four-week nightclub run, he was invited onto Ed Sullivan's radio program, uttering his first radio spiel "This is Jack Benny talking. There will be a slight pause while you say, 'Who cares?'"

== Radio ==
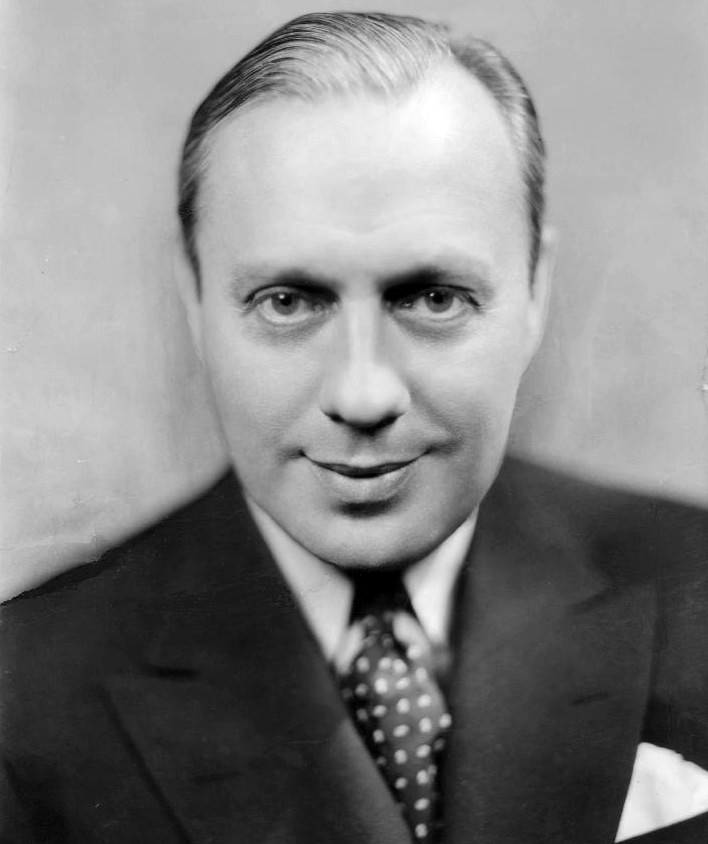
Benny in 1933, newly arrived at NBC and the host of The Chevrolet Program

Benny had been a minor vaudeville performer before becoming a national figure with The Jack Benny Program, a weekly radio show that ran from 1932 to 1948 on NBC and from 1949 to 1955 on CBS. It was among the most highly rated programs during its run.

Benny's long radio career began on April 6, 1932, when the NBC Commercial Program Department auditioned him for the N. W. Ayer & Son agency and their client Canada Dry, after which Bertha Brainard, head of the division, said, "We think Mr. Benny is excellent for radio and, while the audition was unassisted as far as orchestra was concerned, we believe he would make a great bet for an air program." Recalling the experience in 1956, Benny said Ed Sullivan had invited him to guest on his program (1932), and "the agency for Canada Dry ginger ale heard me and offered me a job."

With Canada Dry ginger ale as a sponsor, Benny came to radio on The Canada Dry Program, on May 2, 1932, broadcast on Mondays and Wednesdays on the NBC Blue Network, featuring George Olsen and his orchestra. After a few shows, Benny hired Harry Conn as writer. The show continued on Blue for six months until October 26, moving to CBS on October 30, now airing Thursdays and Sundays. With Ted Weems leading the band, Benny stayed on CBS until January 26, 1933, when Canada Dry opted not to renew Benny's contract after it attempted to replace Conn with Sid Silvers, who would have also gotten a co-starring role. Unlike later incarnations of the Benny show, The Canada Dry Program was primarily a musical program.

Benny then appeared on The Chevrolet Program, airing on the NBC Red Network between March 17, 1933, until April 1, 1934, initially airing on Fridays (replacing Al Jolson), moving to Sunday nights in the fall. The show, which featured Benny and Livingstone alongside Frank Black's orchestra and vocalists James Melton and (later) Frank Parker, ended after General Motors' president insisted on a musical program. He continued with sponsor General Tire on Fridays through the end of September.

The show switched networks to CBS on January 2, 1949, as part of CBS president William S. Paley's notorious "raid" on NBC talent in 1948–1949. It stayed there for the remainder of its radio run, ending on May 22, 1955. CBS aired repeat episodes from 1956 to 1958 as The Best of Benny.

== Television ==
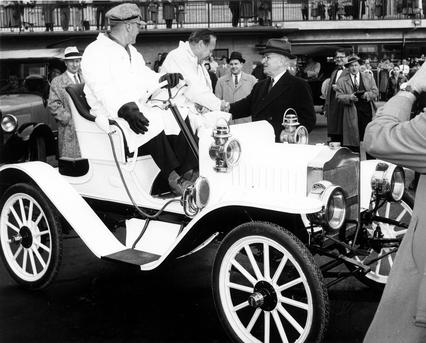
Benny shaking hands with former US president Harry S. Truman in 1958

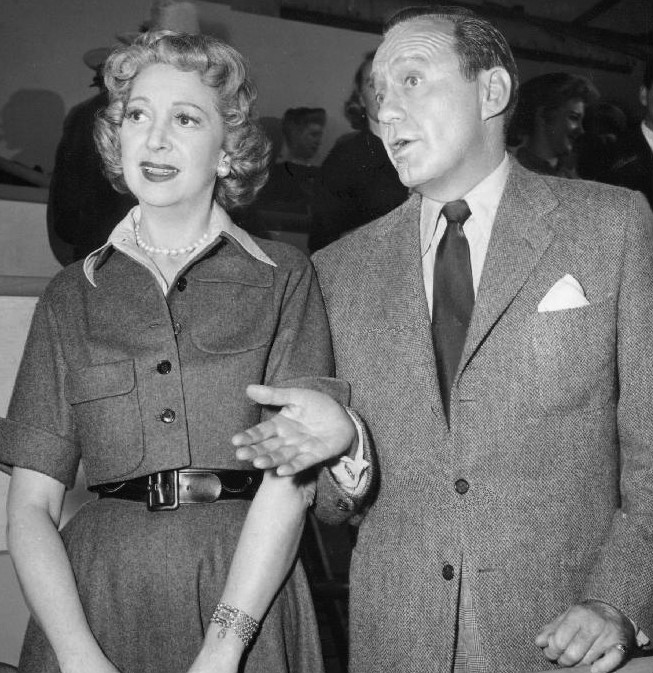
Benny and Mary Livingstone, 1960

After making his television debut in 1949 on local Los Angeles station KTTV, then a CBS affiliate, the network television version of The Jack Benny Program ran from October 28, 1950, to 1965, all but the last season on CBS. Initially scheduled as a series of five "specials" during the 1950–1951 season, the show appeared every six weeks for the 1951–1952 season, every four weeks for the 1952–1953 season and every three weeks in 1953–1954. For the 1953–1954 season, half the episodes were live and half were filmed during the summer, to allow Benny to continue doing his radio show. From the fall of 1954 to 1960, it appeared every other week, and from 1960 to 1965 it was seen weekly.

On March 28, 1954, Benny co-hosted General Foods 25th Anniversary Show: A Salute to Rodgers and Hammerstein with Groucho Marx and Mary Martin. In September 1954, CBS premiered Chrysler's Shower of Stars co-hosted by Jack Benny and William Lundigan. It enjoyed a successful run from 1954 until 1958. Both television shows often overlapped the radio show. In fact, the radio show alluded frequently to its television counterparts. Often as not, Benny would sign off the radio show in such circumstances with the line "Well, good night, folks. I'll see you on television."

When Benny moved to television, audiences learned that his verbal talent was matched by his controlled repertory of dead-pan facial expressions and gesture. The program was similar to the radio show (several of the radio scripts were recycled for television, as was somewhat common with other radio shows that moved to television), but with the addition of visual gags. Lucky Strike was the sponsor. Benny did his opening and closing monologues before a live audience, which he regarded as essential to timing of the material. As in other TV comedy shows, a laugh track was added to "sweeten" the soundtrack, as when the studio audience missed some close-up comedy because of cameras or microphones obstructing their view. Television viewers became accustomed to live without Mary Livingstone, who was afflicted by a striking case of stage fright that didn't lessen even after performing with Benny for 20 years. Hence, Livingstone appeared rarely if at all on the television show. In fact, for the last few years of the radio show, she pre-recorded her lines and Jack and Mary's daughter, Joan, stood in for the live taping, with Mary's lines later edited into the tape replacing Joan's before broadcast. Mary Livingstone finally retired from show business permanently in 1958, as her friend Gracie Allen had done.

Benny's television program relied more on guest stars and less on his regulars than his radio program. In fact, the only radio cast members who appeared regularly on the television program as well were Don Wilson and Eddie "Rochester" Anderson. Singer Dennis Day appeared sporadically, and Phil Harris had left the radio program in 1952, although he did make a guest appearance on the television show (Bob Crosby, Phil's "replacement", frequently appeared on television through 1956). A frequent guest was the Canadian-born singer-violinist Gisele MacKenzie.

As a gag, Benny made a 1957 appearance on the then-wildly popular $64,000 Question. His category of choice was "Violins", but after answering the first question correctly Benny opted out of continuing, leaving the show with just $64; host Hal March gave Benny the prize money out of his own pocket. March made an appearance on Benny's show the same year.

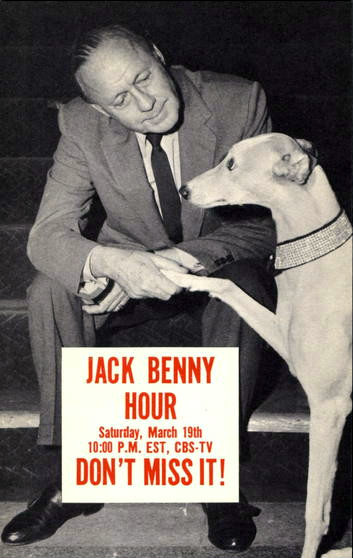
Benny did many television specials after leaving his regularly scheduled show. This is a promotional postcard for one of them, from 1960.

Benny was able to attract guests who rarely, if ever, appeared on television. In 1953, both Marilyn Monroe and Humphrey Bogart made their television debuts on Benny's program.

Another guest star on the Jack Benny show was Rod Serling, who starred in a spoof of The Twilight Zone in which Benny goes to his own house and finds that no one knows who he is; Jack runs away screaming in panic; Serling breaks the fourth wall and remarks not to worry about Benny on the grounds that anyone who has been 39 years old as long as he has is a citizen of the "Twilight Zone".

In 1964, Walt Disney was a guest, primarily to promote his production of Mary Poppins. Benny persuaded Disney to give him over 110 free admission tickets to Disneyland for his friends and one for his wife, but later in the show Disney apparently sent his pet tiger after Benny as revenge, at which point Benny opened his umbrella and soared above the stage like Mary Poppins.

CBS dropped the show in 1964, citing Benny's lack of appeal to the younger demographic the network began courting, and he went to NBC, his original network, in the fall, only to be out-rated by CBS's Gomer Pyle, U.S.M.C. The network dropped Benny at the end of the season. He continued to make occasional specials into the 1970s, the last one airing in January 1974. Benny also appeared on The Lucy Show twice: once as a plumber who resembles Benny and in 1967 "Lucy Gets Jack Benny's account" where Lucy takes Jack on a tour of his new money vault. In the late 1960s, Benny did a series of commercials for Texaco Sky Chief gasoline, using his "stingy" television persona, always telling the attendant, played by Dennis Day, after being implored, "Mr. Benny, won't you please fill up?", "I'll take a gallon."

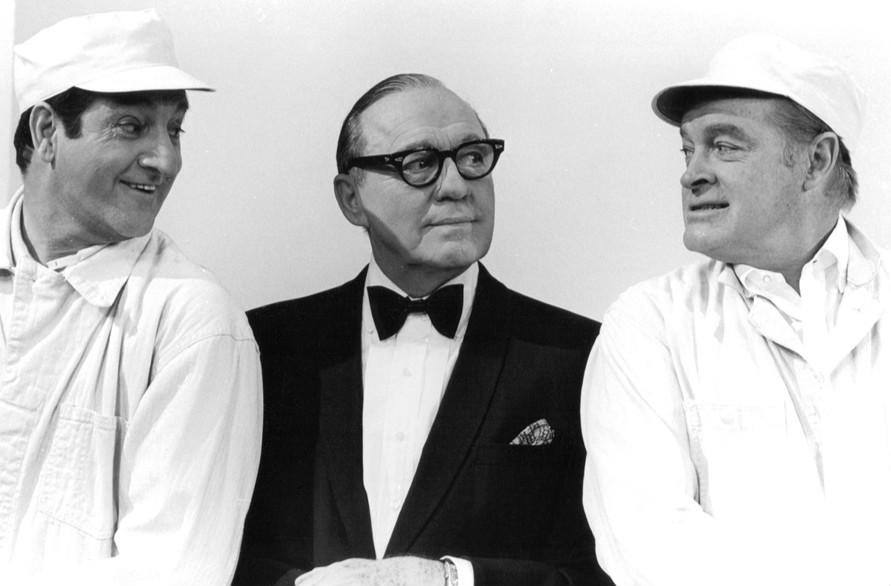
Benny with Danny Thomas (left) and Bob Hope (right) in a 1968 special

In his unpublished autobiography, I Always Had Shoes (portions of which were later incorporated by Jack's daughter, Joan Benny, into her memoir of her parents, Sunday Nights at Seven), Benny said that he, not NBC, made the decision to end his TV series in 1965. He said that while the ratings were still very good (he cited a figure of some 18 million viewers per week, although he qualified that figure by saying he never believed the ratings services were doing anything more than guessing, no matter what they promised), advertisers were complaining that commercial time on his show was costing nearly twice as much as what they paid for most other shows, and he had grown tired of what was called the "rate race". Thus, after some three decades on radio and television in a weekly program, Jack Benny went out on top. In fairness, Benny himself shared Fred Allen's ambivalence about television, though not quite to Allen's extent. "By my second year in television, I saw that the camera was a man-eating monster ... It gave a performer close-up exposure that, week after week, threatened his existence as an interesting entertainer."

In a joint appearance with Phil Silvers on Dick Cavett's show, Benny recalled that he had advised Silvers not to appear on television. However, Silvers ignored Benny's advice and proceeded to win several Emmy awards as Sergeant Bilko on the popular series The Phil Silvers Show.

== Films ==
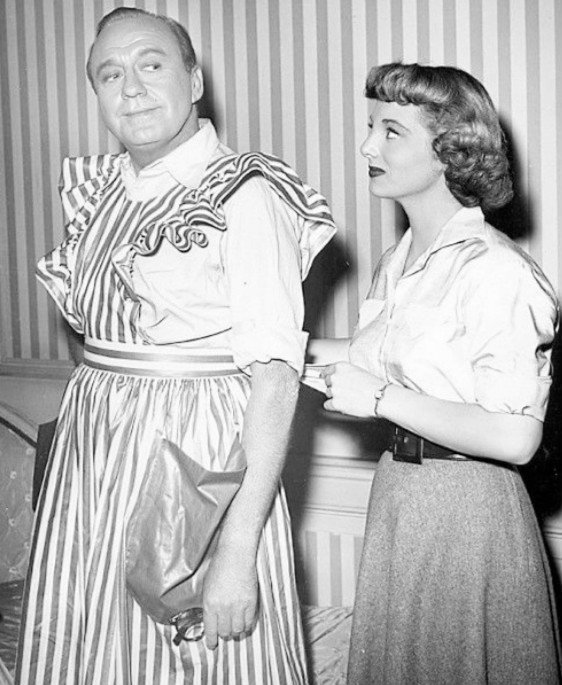
Jack Benny and daughter Joan on the set of his TV show, 1954

Benny also acted in films, including the Academy Award-winning The Hollywood Revue of 1929 (sharing scenes with Laurel and Hardy), Broadway Melody of 1936 (as a benign nemesis for Eleanor Powell and Robert Taylor), George Washington Slept Here (1942), and notably, Charley's Aunt (1941) and To Be or Not to Be (1942). He and Livingstone also appeared in Ed Sullivan's Mr. Broadway (1933) as themselves. Benny often parodied contemporary films and genres on the radio program, and the 1940 film Buck Benny Rides Again features all the main radio characters in a funny Western parody adapted from program skits. The failure of one cinematic Benny vehicle, The Horn Blows at Midnight, became a running gag on his radio and television programs, although contemporary viewers may not find the film as disappointing as the jokes suggest.

Benny may have had an uncredited cameo role in Casablanca, claimed by a contemporary newspaper article and advertisement and reportedly in the Casablanca press book. When asked in his column "Movie Answer Man", film critic Roger Ebert first replied, "It looks something like him. That's all I can say." He wrote in a later column, "I think you're right."

Benny also was caricatured in several Warner Brothers cartoons, including Daffy Duck and the Dinosaur (1939, as Casper the Caveman), I Love to Singa, Slap Happy Pappy, and Goofy Groceries (1936, 1940, and 1941 respectively, as Jack Bunny), Malibu Beach Party (1940, as himself), and The Mouse that Jack Built (1959). The last of these is probably the most memorable: Robert McKimson engaged Benny and his actual cast (Mary Livingstone, Eddie "Rochester" Anderson, and Don Wilson) to do the voices for the mouse versions of their characters, with Mel Blanc – the usual Warner Brothers cartoon voicemeister – reprising his old vocal turn as the always-aging Maxwell, always a phat-phat-bang! away from collapse. In the cartoon, Benny and Livingstone agree to spend their anniversary at the Kit-Kat Club, which (as they discover the hard way) is inside the mouth of a live cat. Before the cat can devour the mice, Benny himself awakens from his dream, then shakes his head, smiles wryly, and mutters, "Imagine, me and Mary as little mice." Then, he glances toward the cat lying on a throw rug in a corner and sees his and Livingstone's cartoon alter egos scampering out of the cat's mouth. The cartoon ends with a classic Benny look of befuddlement. It was rumored that Benny requested that, in lieu of monetary compensation, he receive a print of the finished film.

Benny made a cameo appearance in It's A Mad, Mad, Mad, Mad World (1963).

== Final years ==
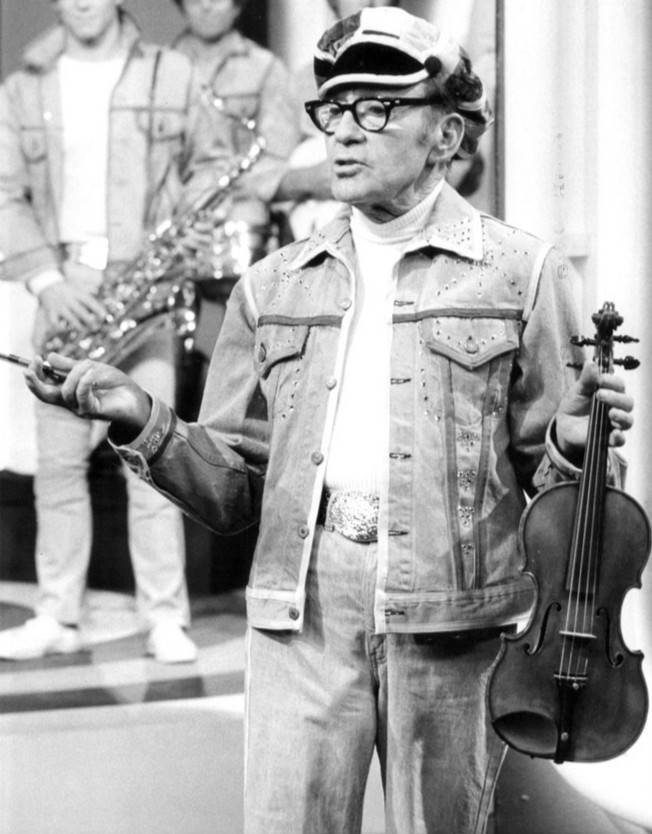
Benny in mod attire on his January 1974 special

After his broadcasting career ended, Benny performed live as a violinist and as a standup comedian.

In the 1960s, Benny was the headlining act at Harrah's Lake Tahoe with trumpeter Harry James, clown Emmett Kelly and singer Ray Vasquez.

Benny made one of his final television appearances on January 23, 1974, as a guest on The Tonight Show Starring Johnny Carson, during which he recreated several classic radio skits with Mel Blanc the day before his final television special aired. Benny was preparing to star in the film version of Neil Simon's The Sunshine Boys when his health failed later that year. He prevailed upon his longtime best friend, George Burns, to take his place on a nightclub tour while preparing for the film. Burns ultimately had to replace Benny in the film as well, going on to win an Academy Award for his performance.

Benny made one last appearance on The Tonight Show on August 21, 1974, with Rich Little as guest host. According to his own statement during that appearance, Benny was still expecting to star in The Sunshine Boys. He also made several appearances on The Dean Martin Celebrity Roast in his final 18 months, roasting Ronald Reagan, Johnny Carson, Bob Hope and Lucille Ball, in addition to himself being roasted in February 1974. The Lucille Ball roast, his last public performance, aired on February 7, 1975, several weeks after his death.

=== Death ===
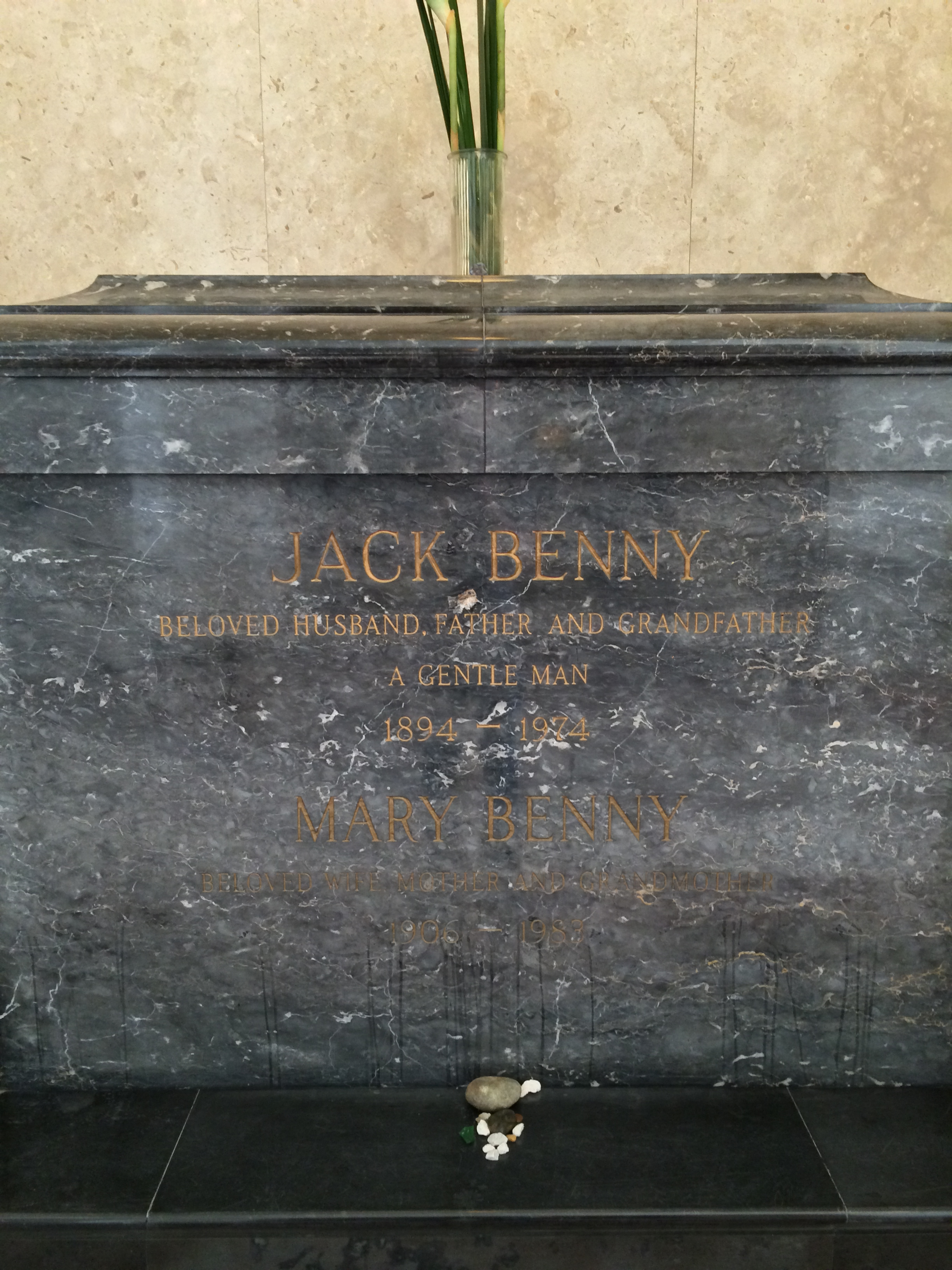
Tomb of Jack Benny, at Hillside Memorial Park

In October 1974, Benny cancelled a performance in Dallas after suffering a dizzy spell, coupled with numbness in his arms. Despite a battery of tests, Benny's ailment could not be determined. When he complained of stomach pains in early December, a first test showed nothing, but a subsequent examination showed that he had inoperable pancreatic cancer. Benny went into a coma at home on December 22, 1974. While in a coma, he was visited by close friends, including George Burns, Bob Hope, Frank Sinatra, Johnny Carson, John Rowles and then Governor Ronald Reagan. He died on December 26, 1974, at age 80.

His funeral at Hillside Memorial Park Cemetery in Culver City, California, on December 29 had 1,800 attendees; it was the biggest funeral for a Hollywood personality since Harry Cohn in 1958. Burns, Benny's best friend for more than fifty years, attempted to deliver a eulogy but broke down shortly after he began and was unable to continue. Hope also delivered a eulogy in which he stated, "For a man who was the undisputed master of comedic timing, you would have to say this is the only time when Jack Benny's timing was all wrong. He left us much too soon." Pallbearers included Sinatra, Mervyn LeRoy, Gregory Peck, Milton Berle, Billy Wilder, Irving Fein, Leonard Gershe, Fred de Cordova and Armand Deutsch. Benny was interred in the main mausoleum of the cemetery. His will arranged for a single long-stemmed red rose to be delivered to his widow, Mary Livingstone, every day for the rest of her life. Livingstone died eight and a half years later on June 30, 1983, at the age of 78.

In trying to explain his successful life, Benny summed it up by stating: "Everything good that happened to me happened by accident. I was not filled with ambition nor fired by a drive toward a clear-cut goal. I never knew exactly where I was going."

Upon his death, Benny's family donated his personal, professional and business papers, as well as a collection of his television shows, to UCLA. The university established the Jack Benny Award for Comedy in his honor in 1977 to recognize outstanding people in the field of comedy. Johnny Carson was the first award recipient. Benny also donated a Stradivarius violin (purchased in 1957) to the Los Angeles Philharmonic Orchestra. Benny had quipped, "If it isn't a $30,000 Strad, I'm out $120."

== Honors and tributes ==
In 1960, Benny was inducted into the Hollywood Walk of Fame with three stars. His stars for television and motion pictures are located at 6370 and 6650 Hollywood Boulevard, respectively, and at 1505 Vine Street for radio. He was inducted into the Television Hall of Fame in 1988 and the National Radio Hall of Fame in 1989. He was also inducted into the Cable Hall of Fame.

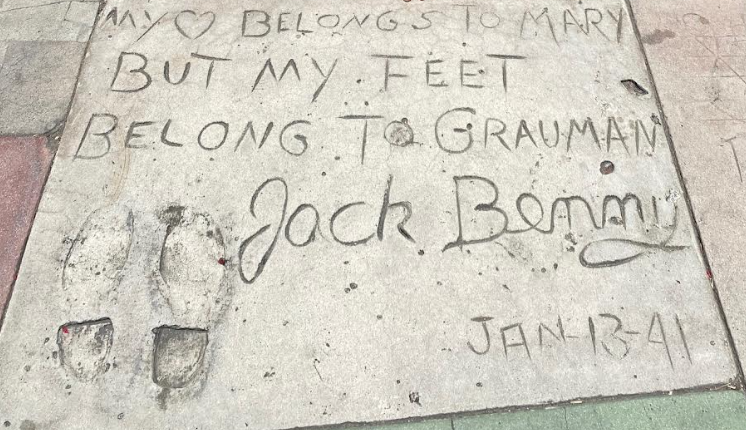
Benny's signature, handprints, and footprints in the concrete in front of Grauman's Chinese Theatre, Los Angeles.

Benny was inducted as a laureate of The Lincoln Academy of Illinois and awarded the Order of Lincoln (the state's highest honor) by the governor of Illinois in 1972 in the area of the performing arts.

A Tribute To Jack Benny, written and narrated by Charles Kuralt, was aired on CBS-TV on the day of his funeral, including coverage of the funeral service.

When the price of a standard first-class U.S. postal stamp was increased to 39 cents in 2006, fans petitioned for a Jack Benny stamp to honor his stage persona's perpetual age. The U.S. Postal Service had issued a stamp depicting Benny in 1991 as part of a booklet of stamps honoring comedians; however, the stamp was issued at the then-current rate of 29 cents.

Jack Benny Middle School in Waukegan is named after Benny. Its motto matches his famous statement as "Home of the '39ers." A statue of Benny with his violin stands in downtown Waukegan.

The British comedian Benny Hill, whose original name was Alfred Hawthorne Hill, changed his name as a tribute to Jack Benny.

Benny was mentioned by Doc Brown in Back to the Future, in which Doc guesses who would be Secretary of the Treasury by 1985, not believing Ronald Reagan was President of the United States of America. He was also mentioned in Where's Pappa.

A Love Letter to Jack Benny aired in 1981, hosted by Johnny Carson, George Burns, and Bob Hope on NBC.

== Selected radio appearances ==
Year	Program	Episode/source
1937	Lux Radio Theatre	Brewster's Millions
1938	Lux Radio Theatre	Seven Keys to Baldpate
1942	Screen Guild Players	Parent by Proxy
1943	Screen Guild Players	Love Is News
1946	Lux Radio Theatre	Killer Cates
1951	Suspense	Murder in G-Flat
1954	Suspense	The Face Is Familiar
