= The Mouse That Jack Built =

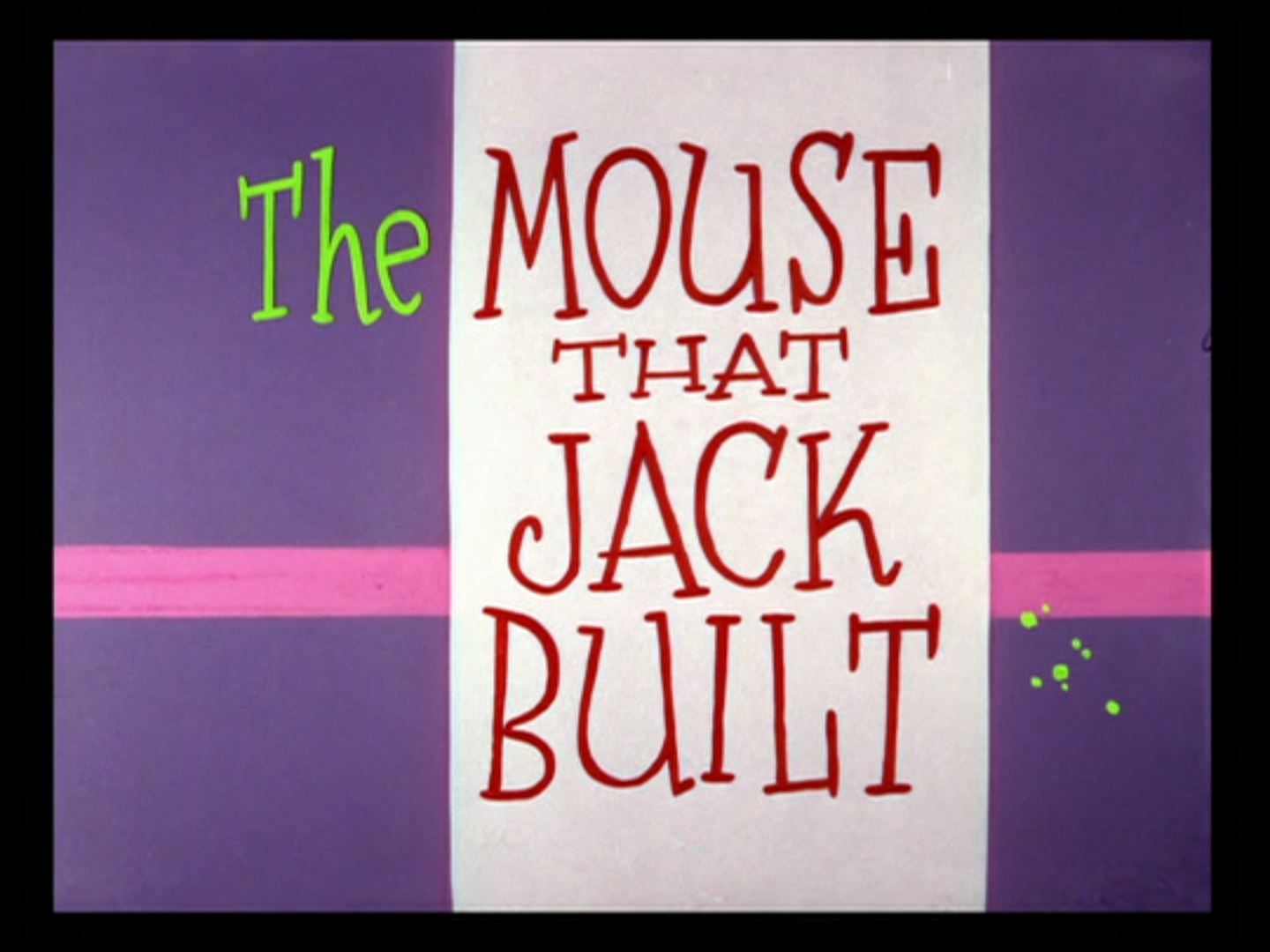
- Title card
- Directed by: Robert McKimson
- Story by: Tedd Pierce
- Starring: Jack Benny; Mary Livingstone; Rochester; Don Wilson; Mel Blanc
- Edited by: Treg Brown
- Music by: Milt Franklyn
- Animation by: Tom Ray; George Grandpré; Ted Bonnicksen; Warren Batchelder
- Layouts by: Robert Gribbroek
- Backgrounds by: Robert Singer
- Color process: Technicolor
- Production company: Warner Bros. Cartoons
- Distributed by: Warner Bros. Pictures; The Vitaphone Corporation
- Release date: April 4, 1959 (U.S.)
- Running time: 6 minutes 54 seconds
- Country: United States
- Language: English

The Mouse That Jack Built is a 1959 Warner Bros. Merrie Melodies cartoon short starring Jack Benny and the regular cast of The Jack Benny Program as mice. The short, released on April 4, 1959, was written by Tedd Pierce and directed by Robert McKimson. The title is a play on the nursery rhyme "This Is the House That Jack Built".

== Plot ==
Somewhere in Beverly Hills, in the house of Jack Benny (a sign out front proclaims, "Star of Stage * Screen * Radio * Television...also cartoons"), a mouse version of Jack is practicing his violin—off-key—and saying to himself, "Who is this guy Isaac Stern?" (In real life Benny and Stern were good friends.) Outside Jack's mouse hole, a cat is lying in wait, wearing ear muffs to filter out the discordant sound of Jack's violin.

Jack calls his servant, Rochester (portrayed as a dark brown mouse) to get his white suit, which Rochester is wearing at the time. Jack tells the valet that his rental period is up (a week for $5.00, equal to $55.22 today) and he needs the suit because he is taking Mary Livingstone out for her birthday, and, true to character, is looking for a good cheap restaurant.

While waiting for Mary, Jack decides to count his cheese in a basement vault. Using a coin on a string, he opens the lock, which appears to be a coin-operated lock from a pay toilet. As soon as he walks through the door, he takes a cane from a nail on the wall and starts humming "We're in the Money". When he reaches the bottom of the stairs, he reaches through a hole and trips a razor blade hanging above the passageway like a guillotine. He then comes up to a derringer and uses the cane to trip the trigger on the derringer. Finally, he comes up to another hole, reaches through with the cane and trips a mousetrap. He then reaches the vault door, opens a combination lock, pulls the door open and numerous sound effects including various alarms, a foghorn and machine gun noises are heard.

Then Ed, the vault guard, asks "Halt! Who goes there?", and then an exchange is heard where Ed, apparently having been in the vault for a long time, some 14 years after World War II, asks "We win the war yet?" When Benny assures Ed that the war has been won, Ed says: "Good. What do you think they'll do with the Kaiser?", thinking he was referring to World War I, the joke being that he's been there a very long time, over 40 years.

Mary arrives while Jack is inspecting his cheese vault, and he emerges wondering who has been pilfering his best gorgonzola. A fat rodent version of Don Wilson attempts to deliver a commercial when Jack advises him that this is a movie and not a television program, at which point Don storms off in a huff when Jack refuses to let him do a scene.

When Mary suggests an apparently expensive restaurant, Jack's eyes ring up like an old cash register with a dollar sign ($) and "no sale", they discuss other options (she sarcastically suggests the Monkey House at the Griffith Park Zoo). As they discuss their options, the cat writes a message extolling the "Kit Kat Club" ("entertainers admitted free") and sends it to Jack as a paper airplane. Jack and Mary putter off in his Maxwell with Rochester behind the wheel until they reach the Kit Kat Club by following the arrows pointing to it. While en route, Mary asks for champagne, while Jack says that he prefers a good "mousecatel". Unbeknownst to them, the "club" is actually the maw of the cat, and as Jack and Mary enter, the cat's mouth closes on them.

Jack cries: "Help! Help!" as the camera cuts to the live-action Jack Benny, who wakes up and, breaking the fourth wall, tells the audience: "Gee, what a crazy dream! Imagine, Mary and me as two little mice trapped inside a cat! And I was playing the violin!" At that point, Jack is interrupted by the sound of a discordant "Rock-a-Bye Baby" played on the violin, coming from within Jack's live-action cat. From there, the rodent versions of Jack and Mary emerge unharmed from the live-action cat. Following one last bit of animation (where the rodent Jack and Mary return to their mousehole), the real Jack Benny does one of his famous "takes" as the cartoon fades out.

== Voice cast ==
The cartoon is noticeable to credit all of the voice actors rather than only crediting Mel Blanc. The list of actors includes:

- Jack Benny as Jack/Himself
- Mary Livingstone as Mary
- Eddie "Rochester" Anderson as Rochester
- Don Wilson as Don
- Mel Blanc as the Maxwell / Ed, the vault guard

== Production ==
The cartoon was released on April 4, 1959. Written by Tedd Pierce, it is a parody of The Jack Benny Program starring the voices of Jack Benny, Mary Livingstone (in her final public performance), Don Wilson and Eddie "Rochester" Anderson as rodent caricatures of their respective radio and television characters, with Mel Blanc reprising his imitation of Benny's Maxwell automobile (also assuming the voice of "Ed", Jack's underground vault guard, usually portrayed on radio and TV by Joseph Kearns). The title is a play on the nursery rhyme "This is the House that Jack Built". As revealed on the audio commentary for this short, Benny only supplied his voice, but not his violin playing, as evidenced by the "pre-score" music of the violin soloist attempting to play as badly as Benny did on the radio show.

== Home media ==
The Mouse That Jack Built is available on Looney Tunes Golden Collection: Volume 3, Disc 2.

== See also ==
- List of American films of 1959
