= Lillian Cornell =

American actress

- Lillian Cornell (fair use)
- Born: Lillian Michuda; June 2, 1916; Chicago, Illinois
- Died: May 25, 2015, (age 98); Miami, Florida
- Occupations: Singer, actress
- Spouse: Asa Fessenden (1947-1984, his death)
- Children: 3

Lillian Cornell (born Lillian Michuda; June 2, 1916 - May 25, 2015) was an American singer on old-time radio and an actress in films in the early 1940s.

== Early years ==
Cornell was born Lillian Michuda June 2, 1916, in Chicago. Her name was changed to Lillian Cornell by studio executives when she began to act in films.

== Radio ==
In 1936, Cornell (billed as Lillian Michuda) had her own radio program on WCFL in her hometown of Chicago, Illinois. Three years later, she had moved to NBC, where she had the self-titled Lillian Cornell program.

She also performed on Pleasure Parade, Club Matinee, Roy Shield Revue, Jamboree and Sunday Dinner at Aunt Fanny's.

== Personal appearances ==
In 1944, Cornell was the featured singer at the Blackstone Hotel in Chicago. A review published in the Chicago Tribune on November 26, 1944, described Cornell as "a dark haired beauty with a clear, impressive voice and an admirably gracious, easy manner."

== Film ==
Cornell's venture into the film industry was initiated via radio. Radio Varieties magazine reported that because radio commitments kept Cornell in Chicago, "her managers arranged a cocktail party in the movie mecca, at which an audition of Lillian's voice was heard by special wire from the Windy City." She signed a contract with Paramount Pictures and soon appeared in Buck Benny Rides Again.

== Television ==
In 1946, Cornell was part of the cast of The Window Shade Revue, a 45-minute musical broadcast on WNBT in New York City. An article in Billboard magazine reported that the program was "said to be one of the biggest budgeted shows yet done by NBC on WNBT since the web took over Channel Four." She also appeared on Close-Ups on NBC that year.

== Personal life ==
In 1947, Cornell married Asa Fessenden. They were married until he died in 1984.

== Death ==
Cornell died May 25, 2015, in Miami, Florida.

== Partial filmography ==
- Buck Benny Rides Again (1940)
- Dancing on a Dime (1940)
- Rhythm on the River (1940)
- The Quarterback (1940)
- Kiss the Boys Goodbye (1941)
- The Mad Ghoul (1943)
- Moon Over Las Vegas (1944)
- Sweethearts of the U.S.A. (1944)

== Partial discography ==
- Gems from Sigmund Rombert Shows - with Sigmund Romberg and his Orchestra and Chorus, Genevieve Row, Eric Mattson and Lawrence Brooks (RCA Victor Album M-1051)
- Gems from Sigmund Romberg Shows, Volume 2 - with Sigmund Romberg and his Orchestra and Chorus, Genevieve Row and Lawrence Brooks (RCA Victor Album MO-1256)
