= Buck Benny Rides Again =

1940 film directed by Mark Sandrich

- Theatrical release poster
- Directed by: Mark Sandrich
- Screenplay by: William Morrow; Edmund Beloin
- Adaptation by: Z. Myers
- Story by: Arthur Stringer
- Produced by: Mark Sandrich; Joseph L. Mankiewicz
- Starring: Jack Benny; Ellen Drew; Eddie 'Rochester' Anderson; Andy Devine; Phil Harris
- Cinematography: Charles Lang
- Edited by: LeRoy Stone
- Music by: Victor Young
- Distributed by: Paramount Pictures
- Release dates: April 24, 1940 (New York City); May 3, 1940 (United States)
- Running time: 82 minutes
- Country: United States
- Language: English

Buck Benny Rides Again is a 1940 American Western comedy film from Paramount Pictures starring Jack Benny and Ellen Drew. The film featured regulars from Benny's radio show including Eddie 'Rochester' Anderson, Andy Devine, Phil Harris, and Dennis Day. It also included a debut film appearance for radio star Lillian Cornell. The film was directed and produced by Mark Sandrich and produced by Joseph L. Mankiewicz.

== Plot ==
Jack Benny resists the entreaties of bandleader Phil Harris to journey to Nevada, where Phil's sweetheart, Brenda Tracy, is waiting for her divorce, until Jack meets Joan Cameron, one of a trio of singing sisters. Believing that the only real men hail from the West, Joan spurns Jack's advances even though her sisters encourage the courtship.

Realizing that Jack's infatuation presents the bait to lure him West, Phil tells Joan that Jack owns a ranch in Nevada, and when Fred Allen's press agent broadcasts the story, all of New York starts talking about Jack's ranch. To save face, Jack, determined to prove that he is a true son of the West, travels to Nevada. After Joan and her sisters arrive to perform at a nearby plush dude ranch, Jack poses as the owner of Andy Devine's spread. To impress Joan, Jack pays Andy's ranch hands to stage fights with him, but his plot backfires when he mistakes two real outlaws for Andy's patsies.

Meanwhile, Joan overhears Rochester, Jack's butler, discussing Jack's ruse, and hires the outlaws to hold Jack up, but when she learns that Fred Allen's press agent is in town, she warns Jack. When the outlaws hold up the hotel, Jack, believing that the robbery is a fake, rushes to the rescue and, with the help of his pet bear Carmichael, captures the bandits and saves Joan.

== Cast ==
- Jack Benny as himself
- Ellen Drew as Joan Cameron
- Eddie 'Rochester' Anderson as Rochester Van Jones
- Andy Devine as himself
- Phil Harris as himself
- Dennis Day as himself
- Virginia Dale as Virginia
- Lillian Cornell as Peggy
- Theresa Harris as Josephine
- Kay Linaker as Brenda Tracy
- Ward Bond as First Outlaw
- Morris Ankrum as Second Outlaw
- Charles Lane as Charlie Graham
- James Burke as Taxi Driver

Although Mary Livingstone is credited as a performer, she is only heard on the radio, as is Fred Allen.
