= Burnt Cork =

American Thoroughbred racehorse

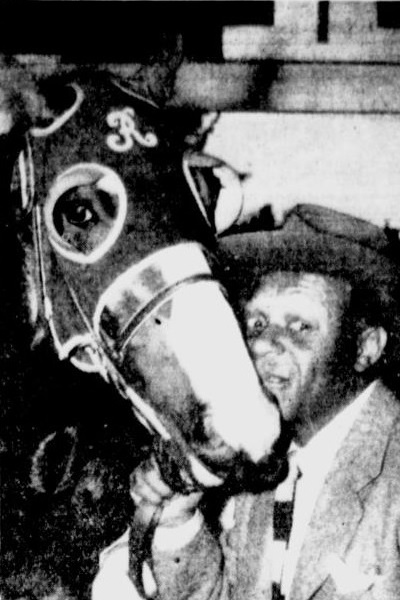
- Burnt Cork with owner comedian Eddie Anderson, before the 1943 Kentucky Derby
- Sire: Mr. Bones
- Grandsire: Royal Minstrel
- Dam: North Wind
- Damsire: North Star
- Sex: Stallion
- Foaled: 1940
- Country: United States
- Colour: Bay
- Breeder: Lucas Berthold Combs
- Owner: Eddie Anderson

Major wins
- Prairie State Stakes (1942)

Burnt Cork (1940–1944) was a thoroughbred race horse, a son of Mr. Bones, who was owned by Eddie 'Rochester' Anderson. His career earnings totaled $21,130 in 38 starts. The horse had 9 wins, places, and shows.

Burnt Cork became the first horse entered at the Kentucky Derby by an African American owner in May 1943. As a dark horse among thoroughbreds eligible for the event, he was timed at 0:36 for 3/8 of a mile on April 6, 1943. Fulfilling a pre-race prediction of a last place finish, Burnt Cork came in 10th in a ten horse field.

Because of his last-place finish, there was some controversy about whether Anderson had entered the horse into the Derby for publicity purposes. Those who claimed this believed that the great race was marred by it. Frank B. Ward of the Youngstown Vindicator newspaper, devoted a considerable amount of space in his May 7, 1943 sports column to addressing this aspect. He pointed out that the horses of other prominent men had finished last in the past and there had been no outcry when that happened.

Ward went on to say that the money for Burnt Cork's Kentucky Derby entry was Anderson's to spend, that the dream of any thoroughbred horse owner was that his or her horse might be classed as good enough to qualify for the race, and one could certainly not blame Anderson for that. Ward continued, saying that Burnt Cork met all Kentucky Derby requirements for inclusion in 1943 and that there were no complaints at all from those who had also entered their horses in the race. He finished this segment by asking what all the shouting was about.

== Career highlights ==
As a 2-year-old, an $800 yearling purchase at Saratoga, Burnt Cork won the $5,000 Prairie State Stakes at Washington Park Race Track in Chicago, Illinois, on September 5, 1942. Before an audience of 25,000 people the thoroughbred bested "All Hoss" owned by H.P. Headley. He was defeated by a length and a half by Woodford Lad, a 2-year-old chestnut colt, in the Hawthorne Stakes at Hawthorne Race Course, on September 26, 1942.

Burnt Cork ranked behind Count Fleet in Jack Campbell's Experimental Handicap list of top juvenile thoroughbreds of 1942. Scoring 114 there were 19 thoroughbreds which were rated higher when the list was released on January 15, 1943.

On June 5, 1943, Burnt Cork gained a show at the $5,000 added Steger Handicap at Hawthorne Race Course.

Burnt Cork died in Los Angeles of a fever he contracted while being shipped from Chicago in July 1944.

== In popular culture ==
Eddie Anderson's real-life venture with Burnt Cork was incorporated into the fictional storyline of radio's Jack Benny Show, which depicted the situation as actually happening to Rochester Van Jones, the character Anderson portrayed on the Benny show.

Back during the November 8, 1942 show Jack Benny's character had bought a horse named Leona from Andy Devine in response to World War II gasoline rationing. The April 25, 1943 episode then used the premise that Jack had now sold Rochester this "old nag" for $4, only to discover that he had sold him an actual thoroughbred, one which Rochester had renamed Burnt Cork and which was now entered in the Kentucky Derby. Then the following two weeks had Jack dealing with the aftermath of the race and the fact that he lost $50 betting on Burnt Cork to win.
