= Irving Fein =

American film producer

- Born: June 21, 1911; Brooklyn, New York City, US
- Died: August 10, 2012 (aged 101); Los Angeles, California, US
- Other name: Producer
- Years active: 1940s–2000
- Spouse(s): Florence Kohn (?–?; divorced), Marion Schecter (1969–2012)

Irving Fein (June 21, 1911 – August 10, 2012) was an American television and film producer, and the manager of entertainers Jack Benny and George Burns.

== Biography ==
=== Early life ===
Irving Fein was born on June 21, 1911, in Brooklyn, New York to Harry Fein, a builder, and his wife Fannie. An exceptional student, Irving skipped three grade levels before graduating grade school at just twelve years old. After graduating from Erasmus Hall High School, he went on to attend the University of Baltimore before transferring to the Alexander Meiklejohn Experimental College at the University of Wisconsin. It was during the summer months, while Fein was attending children's camps, that he became interested in dramatics and writing.

=== Career ===
After writing several short stories, Fein was hired to work in the publicity and advertising department for Warner Brothers in New York City. He attended Brooklyn Law School in the evening, concurrently with his job at Warners', and eventually earned his law degree. He turned down an offer to work in the legal department at Warner Brothers, and instead moved to their California office where he began in the mailroom. He soon joined their publicity department, making thirty-five dollars a week. Less than a year after moving to California, Irving received an offer to join the publicity department at Columbia Pictures. He accepted, and his salary jumped to one hundred fifty dollars a week. During his career as a publicist he worked for Warner Brothers, Columbia Pictures and Metro Goldwyn Mayer.

=== Jack Benny ===
In 1947, Fein began his twenty-eight-year association with Jack Benny when he was hired as Benny's publicity and advertising director. From 1936 to 1940, Benny's radio show had been number one, but soon dropped to number four, with Bob Hope, Edgar Bergen, and the Lux Radio Theatre gaining in popularity. Six months after Fein joined Benny, his show was back at number one. Over the next nine years, Fein became Benny's manager and producer, as well as handling all of the PR work involved. During the many years of their long association, Fein kept Jack Benny a number-one star on TV, in personal appearances, and in the concert world performing with the most notable symphony orchestras in the U.S. and Europe.

In 1956, William S. Paley wooed Irving away from Jack, naming him a vice president at CBS and moving him and his family to New York City. However, Jack Benny did not want any other manager but Fein, and in less than a year Irving came back to Hollywood as President of "J&M Productions", Jack Benny's company [created in 1955 to guarantee additional income by producing his own series and several others; MCA acquired the company in 1962]. Along with all of the Jack Benny shows, J&M produced the popular television series Checkmate, as well as The Gisele MacKenzie Show (1957–58), The Marge and Gower Champion Show (1957), Holiday Lodge, starring Wayne and Shuster in their first American TV series (1961) and Ichabod and Me (1961–62). Fein also served as executive producer of Jack's weekly series until it ended in 1965, and his yearly NBC specials until Benny's death in 1974.

=== George Burns ===
Near the end of Jack's life, Fein had become helpful to George Burns. After the death of Gracie Allen, George struggled as a single act. Irving became George's manager and producer and turned his career around. George's star turn in The Sunshine Boys, a role which Irving was instrumental in getting him, earned George an Academy Award. This was the beginning of another long personal and business relationship which lasted twenty-two years, until George Burns died.

=== Awards and achievements ===
During Fein's long and distinguished career he earned many awards, including an Emmy for one of the Jack Benny television shows he produced. He also authored several books, including the bestseller "Jack Benny: An Intimate Biography". In film, Irving Fein produced or co-produced several of George Burns' films. Fein was included in the In Memorium segment of the Primetime Emmys broadcast September 23, 2012.

=== Personal life ===
Fein was first married to Florence Kohn, with whom he had two children, Tisha Fein (a television producer), and Michael Fein (a doctor). He married Marion Schechter in 1969 and has a stepson, Dan Schechter. He died of congestive heart failure on the morning of August 10, 2012, at the age of 101. Fein was buried in Hillside Memorial Park Cemetery.
