= Don Wilson (announcer) =

American radio and television announcer and actor (1900–1982)

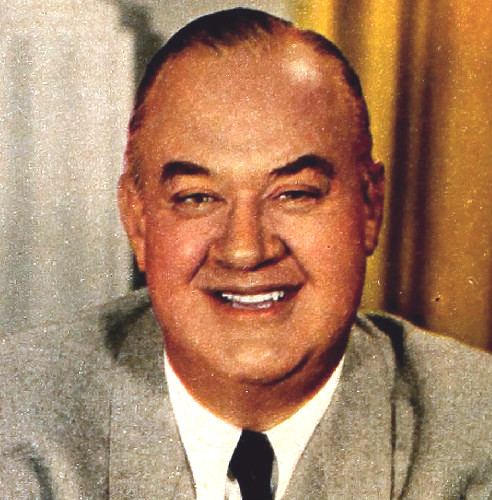
- Wilson in 1949
- Born: September 1, 1900; Lincoln, Nebraska, U.S.
- Died: April 25, 1982 (aged 81); Cathedral City, California, U.S.
- Years active: 1923–1982
- Known for: The Jack Benny Program
- Spouses: Lucy Jane Masterson (m. 1927; div. 1940) Peggy Ann Kent (m. 1940; div. 1942) Marusia Radunska (m. 1942; div. 1949) Lois Corbett (m. 1950)

Don Wilson (September 1, 1900 – April 25, 1982) was an American announcer and actor in radio and television, with a Falstaffian vocal presence, remembered best as the rotund announcer and comic foil to the star of The Jack Benny Program.

== Early life ==
Wilson played football for the University of Colorado in the 1920s. For his size he was an excellent sportsman, and was an excellent amateur golfer, teaming up with fellow NBC announcer Bud Stevens to win many matches in Southern California.

Wilson began his radio career as a singer over Denver radio station KFEL in 1923. By 1929, he was working at KFI, and shortly afterwards for Don Lee at KHJ, in Los Angeles. In a 1978 appearance on Tomorrow with Tom Snyder, Wilson claimed he was fired from KHJ because he had bought a Packard from Earle C. Anthony, the business arch-rival of Cadillac dealer Don Lee and owner of KFI and KECA.

== Career ==
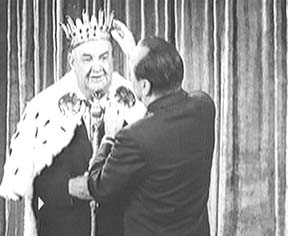
Wilson (left) is honored by Jack Benny on his 27th anniversary in broadcasting (January 1961)

Though best known for his comedy work with Benny, Wilson had a background as a sportscaster, covering the opening of the 1932 Summer Olympics as well as college football games for NBC Radio. He appeared in two Broadway shows in the 1930s: The Passionate Pilgrim, which opened October 19, 1932, and The First Legion, which opened October 1, 1934. Wilson first worked with Benny on the broadcast of April 6, 1934, concurrent with a short stint as announcer on George Gershwin's series, Music by Gershwin. At 6 feet (1.83 m) and 300 pounds (140 kg), Wilson possessed a resonant voice, a deep belly laugh, and a plump figure, all of which would become important parts of his character with Benny. Though Wilson's primary function as announcer was to read the opening and the commercial pitches – notably for Jell-O, Grape-Nuts, and Lucky Strike – his importance to the program was serving as both feed and foil to Jack and other cast members. A recurring goal was his effort to get the Sportsmen Quartet singing commercials approved by Benny.

On radio in particular, Wilson's girth could be exploited, both in jokes by Benny and in audio gags, such as the amount of time it took a railroad porter to brush the soot off of Don following a train trip, or to measure charging him by the pound.

Wilson rarely flubbed his lines. His most famous incident occurred on the January 8, 1950 broadcast. The script called for him to refer to columnist Drew Pearson, but Wilson read the name as "Drear Pooson". Later on in the broadcast, during a murder-mystery skit, Frank Nelson was instructed – without Jack Benny's knowledge – to take advantage of the situation. Benny asked Nelson, "Pardon me, are you the doorman?" and Nelson, in his customary sarcastic manner, came back with: "Well who do you think I am, Drear Pewson?," to sustained laughter and applause.

Wilson also served stints as announcer for radio comedy or variety shows starring Alan Young, Bing Crosby, Ginny Simms, and Fanny Brice's comedy hit Baby Snooks. In 1946, Don Wilson was a regular on the daytime comedy Glamour Manor, opposite former Jack Benny Program regular Kenny Baker.

Wilson accompanied Benny into television in 1950, remaining with him through the end of the series in 1965. On television, the fat jokes were toned down only slightly, mostly because the real Wilson was not as impossibly large as the radio Wilson was described. These appearances also often involved the fictional character of Don's equally hefty, aspiring announcer son, Harlow (played by Dale White). Wilson co-starred with Benny in Buck Benny Rides Again (1940) and voicing a caricature of himself in The Mouse that Jack Built, a 1959 Warner Brothers spoof of The Jack Benny Program directed by Robert McKimson. Wilson appeared in the Broadway show Make a Million, which opened on October 23, 1958.

In 1959, Wilson appeared as a flim-flam preacher in the episode, "Gates Ajar Morgan", on the syndicated anthology series, Death Valley Days, hosted by Stanley Andrews. In the story line, Morgan promotes a false religious philosophy based on the novel The Gates Ajar. He must confess the sham to save his friend and benefactor from a lynch mob. The episode also features Chris Alcaide and Sue Randall.

His other film roles included small appearances as announcers or commentators in several films, providing narration for Walt Disney's Academy Award nominated short Ferdinand the Bull, and a credited appearance as Mr. Kettering opposite Marilyn Monroe in Niagara. His role in the film Village Barn Dance was acclaimed by a review that said, "Surprise performance was that of Don Wilson ... who steals the show with his portrayal of a good-humored, grinning radio announcer."

Wilson did frequent commercials and appeared in the Western Union Candygram commercials as their spokesman from 1969 through 1971. Those who recall the commercial remember him blaring out "Just tell them I want to send a Candygram."

His final on-camera appearance in a series was in two episodes of the 1960s Batman as newscaster Walter Klondike (spoofing Walter Cronkite). Wilson would continue to appear on talk-shows throughout his life whenever a program would salute Jack Benny or talk about old-time radio.

== Personal life ==
Wilson was married four times. His second wife was Peggy Ann Kent, daughter of 20th Century Fox President Sidney R. Kent. They were married November 19, 1940 and divorced in December, 1942. The same month the divorce was final, Wilson married Polish countess Marusia Radunska. This marriage ended in divorce in 1949. Wilson finally found a lasting partnership with fourth wife, radio actress Lois Corbett (who occasionally appeared as "Mrs. Wilson" on Benny's later radio and TV shows). Together they hosted a local Palm Springs, California television show Town Talk from 1968 until the mid-1970s.

== Death ==
Wilson and his wife lived in Palm Springs after his retirement. He died of a stroke in his Cathedral City, California home in April 1982.

== Sources ==
- Dunning, John (1998). On the Air: The Encyclopedia of Old-Time Radio. New York: Oxford University Press. ISBN 978-0-19-507678-3
