= Mary Livingstone =

American radio comedian and actress (1905–1983)

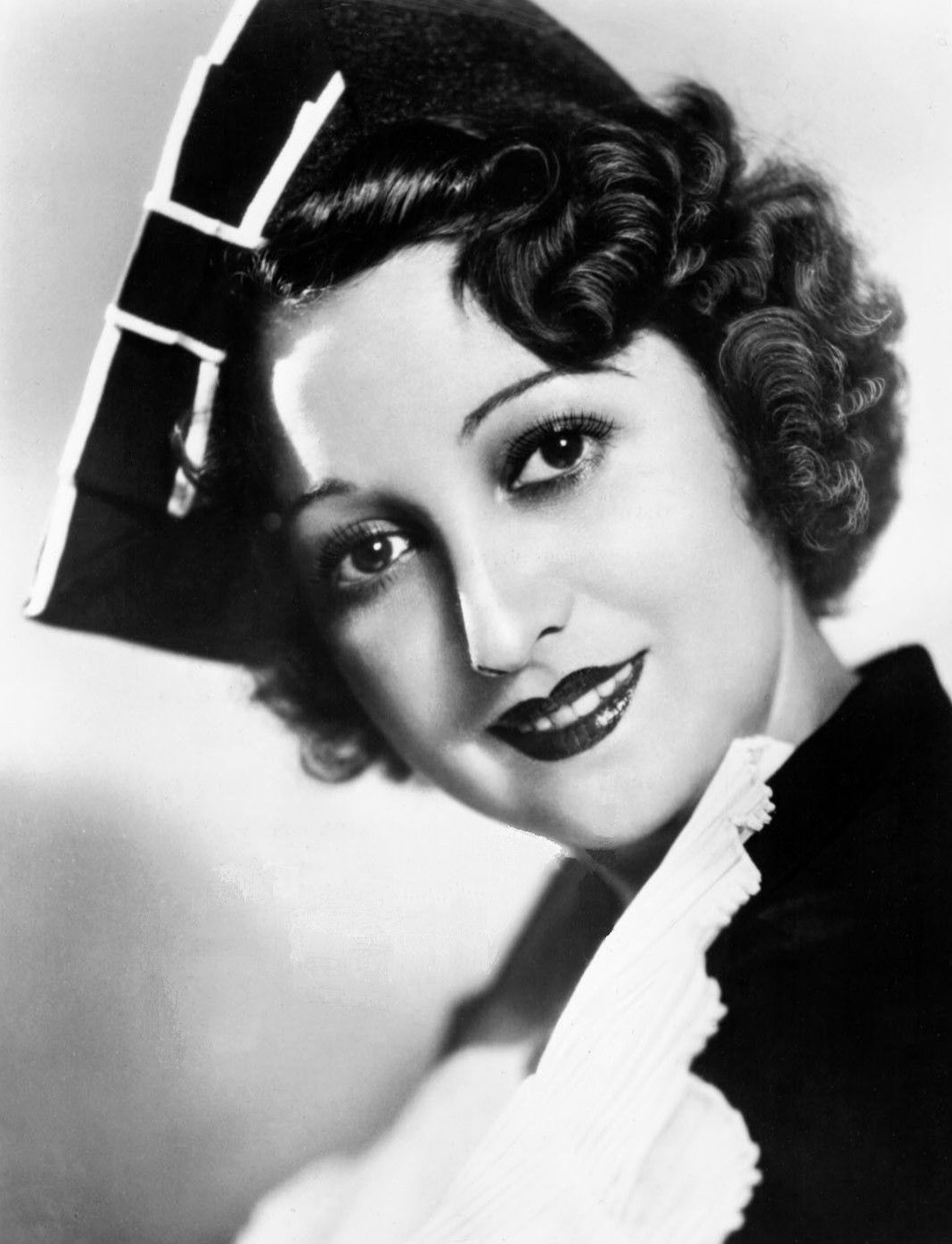
- Livingstone in 1935
- Born: Sadya Marcowitz; June 25, 1905; Seattle, Washington, U.S.
- Died: June 30, 1983 (aged 78); Los Angeles, California, U.S.
- Occupations: Actress, comedian
- Television: The Jack Benny Program
- Spouse: Jack Benny (m. 1927; died 1974)
- Children: 1

Mary Livingstone (born Sadya Marcowitz, later known as Sadie Marks; June 25, 1905 – June 30, 1983) was an American radio comedienne and actress. She was the wife and radio partner of comedian Jack Benny.

Enlisted to perform on her husband's program, she proved a talented comedian. But she also experienced stage fright years after her career was established, so much so that she retired from show business completely, after two decades in the public eye, almost three decades before her death and at the height of her husband and partner's fame.

== Early life ==
Livingstone was born Sadya Marcowitz in Seattle, Washington, but raised in Vancouver, British Columbia. Her father, David Marcowitz (or Markowitz), was a prosperous Jewish scrap metal dealer from Romania. Her mother was Esther Wagner Marcowitz. They changed their surname to Marks several years after Sadya was born. Livingstone's brother, Hilliard Marks, was a radio and television producer who worked primarily for his future brother-in-law, Jack Benny.

Livingstone first met her future husband, Jack Benny, in Vancouver at a Passover seder in her family home in 1922, when Benny was playing the Orpheum Theatre. Benny accompanied his friend Zeppo (b. Herbert) Marx.

Zeppo Marx took Benny to the home of David Marks, where they enjoyed a quiet and comfortable gathering. Marks's youngest daughter, Sadie (her name was anglicized), was very impressed by this comedian who played a violin as part of his act. By her own testimony she made up her mind that she would grow up and marry Jack Benny someday."
– American National Biography

Despite the two families' acquaintance, and similar surnames, Livingstone was unrelated to the Marx Brothers.

== Courting Jack Benny ==
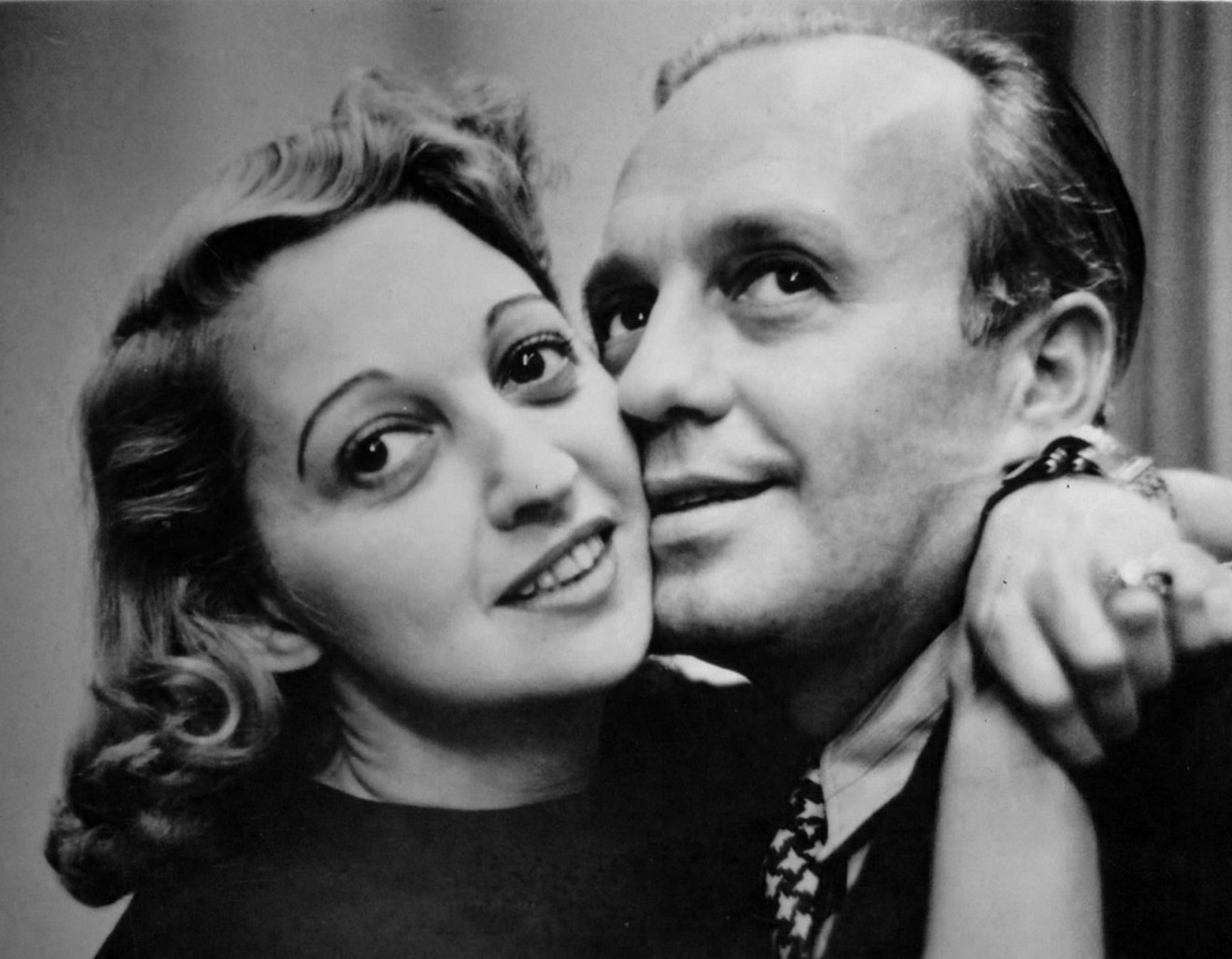
Livingstone and Benny, 1939

In 1925, aged 20, Sadie visited California with her family while Jack Benny was in the same town for a show. Still nursing a small crush on the comedian, Sadie went to the theater to re-introduce herself to him. As he approached her in a hallway, she smiled and said, "Hello, Mr. Benny, I'm..." But he curtly cut her off with a "hello" and continued on his way down the hall without pausing; she learned much later that when Benny was deep in thought about his work, it was nearly impossible to get his attention.

They met again a year later, while she was said to be working as a lingerie salesgirl at a May Company department store in downtown Los Angeles – and the couple finally began dating. Invited on a double-date by a friend who had married Sadie's sister, Babe, Benny brought Sadie along to keep him company. This time, the couple clicked: Jack was finally smitten with Sadie and asked her on another date. She turned him down at first, as she was seeing another young man, but Benny persisted. He visited her at the May Company almost daily and was reputed to buy so much ladies' hosiery from her that he helped her set a sales record; he also called her several times a day when on the road.

Jack Benny married Mary Livingstone January 14, 1927, at the Clayton Hotel in Waukegan, Illinois, one week after proposing.

== Personal life ==
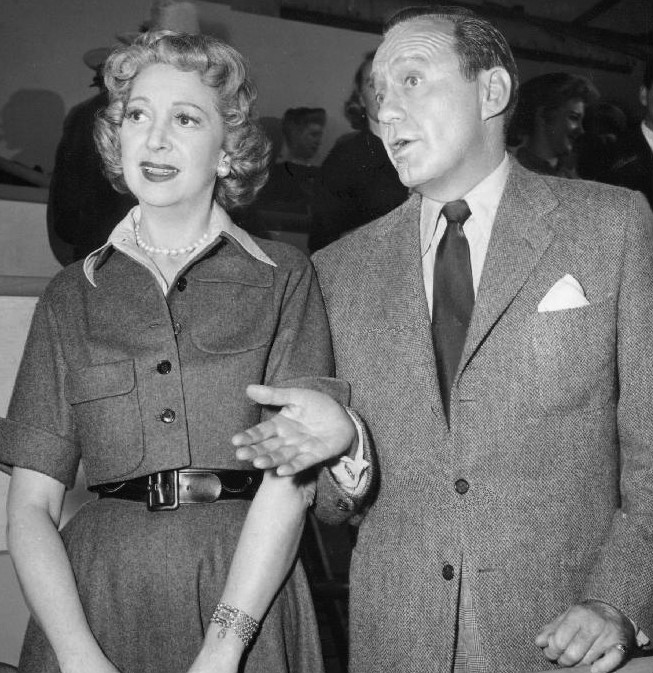
Mary Livingstone and Jack Benny, 1960

Livingstone's brother, Hilliard Marks, was a radio and television producer who worked primarily for his brother-in-law, Jack Benny.

Benny and Livingstone adopted a two-week old girl in 1934, whom they named Joanie. In Sunday Nights at Seven (1990), her father's unfinished memoir that she completed with her own recollections, Joan Benny revealed she rarely felt close to her mother, and the two often argued:

She had so many good qualities – her sense of humor, her generosity, her loyalty to her friends. She had a famous, successful, and adoring husband; she had famous, interesting, and amusing friends; she lived in luxury; she was a celebrity in her own right. In short, she had everything a woman could possibly want. When I think of her it's with sadness because I wish she could have enjoyed it all more.

Lucille Ball referred to Livingstone as a "hard-hearted Hannah", and said that she exerted too much control over her husband's life. George Burns, one of Jack Benny's closest friends, was not particularly fond of Livingstone. He believed that she intimidated her husband and was running his life. He also believed that Livingstone lacked talent.

"Mary wasn't a bad person, she was just difficult, a little jealous and insecure. She didn't want to have better things than her friends had, particularly Gracie; she wanted to have the same things, but more of them. And bigger."

Ostensibly Livingstone's best friend, Burns's wife Gracie Allen confided to a friend that "Mary Benny and I are supposed to be dearest of friends, but we're not. I love Jack and I can tolerate Mary, but there are some things about her I don't like". Allen went on to describe Livingstone's desire to one-up any purchase of luxury items. Burns noted that while their circle of friends found Livingstone challenging, there was also a sense of fierce loyalty between them.

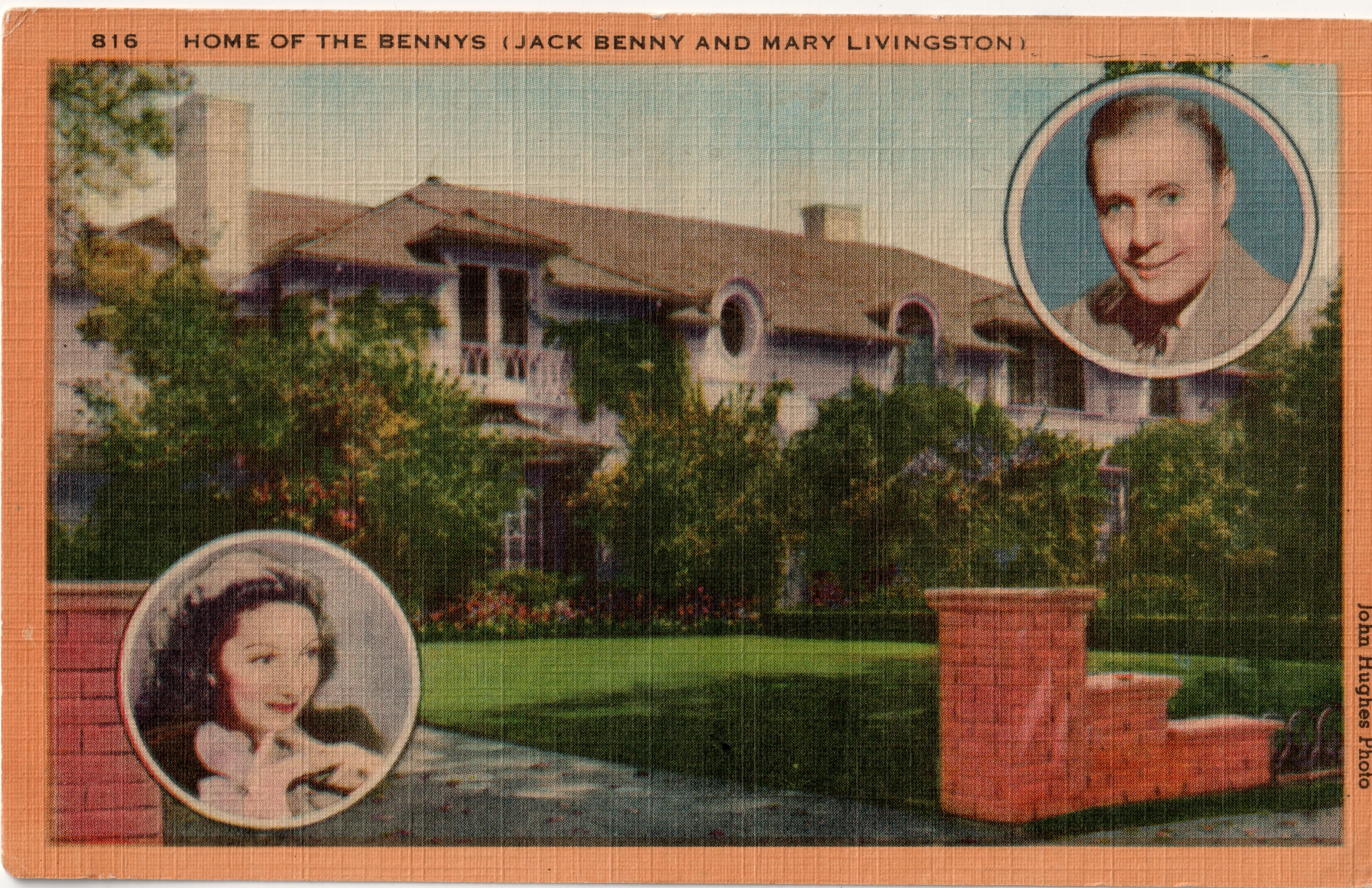
Home of Jack Benny and Mary Livingstone

== Performance career ==
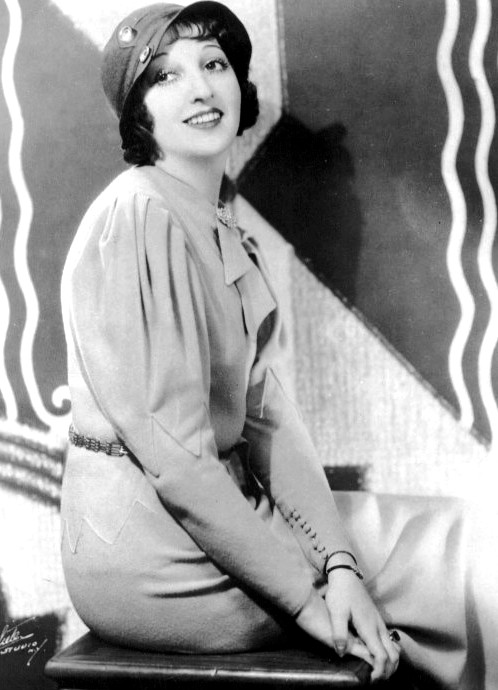
As part of Benny's vaudeville act; she was still known as Sadie at the time

Sadie took part in some of Jack's vaudeville performances but never thought of herself as a full-time performer, seeming glad to be done with it when he moved to radio in 1932. Then came the day he called her at home and asked her to come to the studio quickly. An actress hired to play a part on the evening's show didn't show up and, instead of risking a hunt for a substitute, Benny thought his wife could handle the part: a character named Mary Livingstone scripted as Benny's biggest fan.

At first, it seemed like a brief role; she played the part on that night's and the following week's show before being written out of the scenario. But NBC received so much fan mail that the character was revived into a regular feature on the Benny show, and the reluctant Sadie Marks became a radio star in her own right. Livingstone underwent a change, too, from fan to tart secretary-foil; the character occasionally went on dates with Benny's character but they were rarely implied to be truly romantically involved otherwise. The lone known exceptions were a fantasy sequence used on both the radio and television versions of the show, as well as during an NBC musical tribute to Benny, in which Mary admitted to being "Mrs. Benny".

=== "Chiss Sweeze" ===
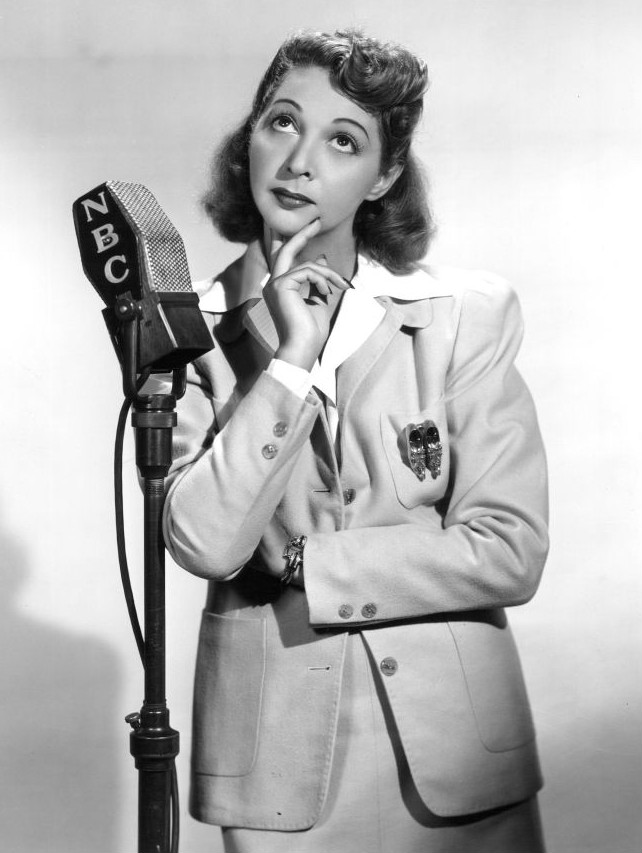
Mary Livingstone, 1940

Livingstone's "chiss sweeze sandwich" order in a lunch counter sketch was referred to for several years afterwards (episode 333; October 27, 1946). Another flubbed line was "How could you possibly hit a car when it was up on the grease rack?" Instead, she asked, "How could you possibly hit a car when it was up on the grass reek?" The following week, Benny devoted much of the show to poking fun at the tongue twister, chastising her for using the made-up phrase "grass reek". But Jack got his comeuppance later in the show, when the show's guest, the real-life Beverly Hills police chief, was talking about the strange call the department got the night before: two skunks fighting on someone's lawn. "And let me tell you," he said, "when they were done, did that grass reek!" Mary then took great satisfaction out of making Jack admit to the millions of listeners that "grass reek" did exist ("Boy did that grease rack!" "That's "grass reek!"" "Well make up your mind!"). It was also mentioned in a later show when, while Christmas shopping, Mary notices a toy gas station and says that it "even has a grease rack". This was a typical example of Benny's and Livingstone's (and the show's writers') ability to improvise comedy from un-scripted errors.

Mary's trademark gag on the radio show, other than beleaguering Benny, was to read letters from her mother (who lived in Plainfield, New Jersey), usually beginning with "My darling daughter Mary...". The letters often included comical stories about Mary's (fictional) sister Babe – similar to Sadie's real sister Babe in name only – who was so masculine she played as a linebacker for the Green Bay Packers and worked in steel mills and coal mines, or their ne'er-do-well father, who always seemed to be a half-step ahead of the law. Mother Livingstone, naturally enough, detested Benny and was forever advising her daughter to quit his employ.

=== Stage fright ===
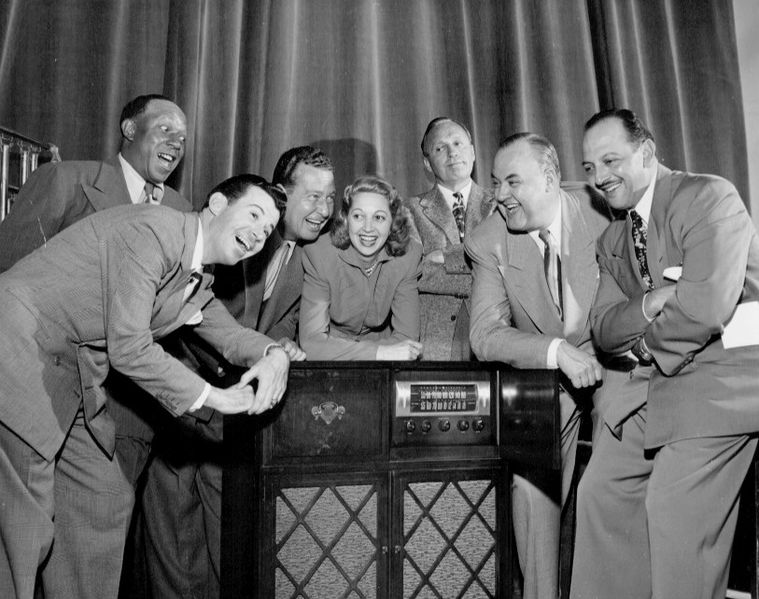
Radio cast photo

Never very comfortable as a performer despite her success, Livingstone's stage fright became so acute by the time the Benny show was moving toward television that she rarely appeared on the radio show in its final season, 1954–55. When she did appear, the Bennys' adopted daughter, Joan, occasionally acted as a stand-in for her mother, or Mary's lines were read in rehearsals by Jack's script secretary, Jeanette Eyman, while Livingstone's prerecorded lines were played during live broadcasts.

=== Retirement ===
Livingstone made few appearances on the television version – mostly in filmed episodes – and finally retired from show business after her close friend Gracie Allen did so in 1958. Her Washington Post obituary quoted Livingstone about her stage fright: "It ended up with every Sunday night being the most torturous day of the week," she once said. "TV was even harder; every week became a nightmare. I finally just told Jack I was going to quit or I was going to die."

One of her final performances was as a mouse spoof of herself in The Mouse That Jack Built, a Merrie Melodies cartoon from 1959 lampooning the radio show. Her final performance as Mary Livingstone came on Benny's 1970 "20th Anniversary Special". When introducing her to the audience, Benny noted that it was her first time performing in fifteen years and the pre-recorded segment made references to her performance anxiety.

== Death ==
After writing a biography of her husband, Livingstone – whose surname is often misspelled without the 'e', as with her star on the Hollywood Walk of Fame for her contribution to radio – died from heart disease at her home in Holmby Hills on June 30, 1983, five days after her 78th birthday, though several outlets reported her age as 77.
