= 1948 in radio =

The year 1948 saw a number of significant events in radio broadcasting.

== Events ==
- 22 March – The Voice of Firestone becomes the first radio program to be aired on both AM and FM radio stations.
- 12 May – Don McNeill's Breakfast Club appears on television for the first time, via a simulcast on both ABC Radio and ABC TV. The telecast is seen in Philadelphia, Baltimore, Washington and New York. Because ABC-TV's New York flagship station WJZ-TV had not signed on yet (and would not for another three months), DuMont flagship WABD carried it live.
- 17 May – The Dewey–Stassen debate becomes the first presidential primary debate to be broadcast on American radio stations.
- 6 August – Truman aide Donald Dawson and U.S. Representative Karl Mundt appear on Meet the Press, during which Newsweek journalist Ernest Lindley asks Mundt whether Elizabeth Bentley and Whittaker Chambers had spent time in mental institutions (Mundt calls these unjustified rumors).
- 27 August – Whittaker Chambers appears on Meet the Press with journalists Nathan Finney, Edward T. Folliard, James Reston, Tom Reynolds, and Lawrence E. Spivak: Folliard asks Chambers immediately whether he will say publicly that Alger Hiss is a Communist, and Chambers does.
- 28 September – Thirty-two FM radio stations participate in the "first coast-to-coast exclusively FM 15,000-cycle network program."

== Debuts ==
=== Programs ===
- 5 January – Mrs Dale's Diary debuts on the BBC Light Programme.
- 13 February – Call for Music debuts on CBS.
- 23 March – Take It From Here debuts on BBC radio.
- 3 April – Louisiana Hayride from Shreveport debuts.
- 30 May – Johnny Fletcher debuts on ABC.
- 10 June – Hallmark Playhouse debuts on CBS.
- 27 June – Destination Freedom, episodes by Richard Durham, debuts on WMAQ
- 4 July - The Jane Pickens Show debuts on NBC.
- 5 July — The Amazing Mr. Tutt debuts on CBS.
- 5 July – Cabin B-13 makes its debut on CBS.
- 22 August – Box 13 debuts on WOR.
- 21 September – Life with Luigi premieres on CBS.
- 27 September – Herb Shriner Time debuts on CBS.
- 3 October - Family Hour of Stars debuts on CBS.
- 3 October - Electric Theatre debuts on CBS.
- 11 October – The Brighter Day debuts on NBC.
- 9 November - This Is Your Life debuts on NBC.
- 12 October – Any Questions? debuts on the BBC Home Service; it will still be broadcast more than 60 years later.
- 26 December – Annual Reith Lecture debuts on the BBC Home Service; Bertrand Russell delivers the first.

=== Stations ===
- (undated) - WDXB, Chattanooga, Tennessee, begins broadcasting on 1490 kHz with 250 W power (full-time).
- (undated) – WOKZ-FM, Alton, Illinois, begins broadcasting on 99.9 MHz.
- (undated) – -WROV-FM, Roanoke, Virginia, begins broadcasting on 103.7 MHz.
- (undated) – KCFM-FM, Kansas City, Missouri, begins broadcasting on 94.9 MHz.
- (undated) – KDAC, Fort Bragg, California, begins broadcasting on 1230 kHz with 250 W power (full-time).
- (undated) January – WXAL, Demopolis, Alabama, begins broadcasting on 1400 kHz.
- (undated) January – WIST-FM, Charlotte, North Carolina, begins broadcasting on 104.7 MHz.
- (undated) January – WLET-FM, Toccoa, Georgia, begins broadcasting on 102.9 MHz.
- (undated) November – KFAM-FM, St. Cloud, Minnesota, begins broadcasting on 104.7 MHz.
- 1 January – WLCR, Torrington, Connecticut, begins broadcasting on 990 kHz with 1 KW power (daytime only).
- 1 January – WBUZ-FM, Bradbury Heights, Maryland, begins broadcasting on 96.7 MHz.
- 7 January – KVVC, Ventura, California, begins broadcasting on 1590 kHz with 1 KW power (full-time).
- 10 January – WTWA, Thomson, Georgia, begins broadcasting as a Mutual affiliate on 1240 kHz with 250 W power.
- 14 January – WSAC, Columbus, Georgia, a Mutual affiliate, begins broadcasting on 1460 kHz with 1 KW power.
- 19 January – WKOW, Madison, Wisconsin, begins broadcasting on 1070 kHz with 10 KW power (full-time).
- 24 January – KERN-FM, Bakersfield, California, begins broadcasting on 94.1 MHz.
- 26 January – WJOC, Jamestown, New York, begins broadcasting on 1470 kHz with 1 KW power (daytime).
- 31 January – KYSM-FM, Mankato, Minnesota, begins operation at 103.5 mc.
- 31 January – KLEE, Houston, Texas, begins broadcasting on 610 kHz with 5 KW power.
- 1 February – WATO, Oak Ridge, Tennessee, begins broadcasting on 1490 MHz with 250 W power (full-time).
- 2 February – WIBG-FM, Philadelphia, Pennsylvania, begins broadcasting on 94.1 MHz.
- 4 February – WOKZ, Alton, Illinois, begins broadcasting.
- 14 February – WHNY-FM, Watertown, N.Y., begins operation.
- 18 February – WIRL, Peoria, Illinois, begins operation on 1290 kHz with 5 KW power (full-time).
- 18 February – WFLB, Fayetteville, North Carolina, begins broadcasting on 1490 kHz with 250 W power.
- 25 February – KRKL, Kirkland, Washington, begins operation as a 250-watt daytime station with studios and transmitter in the Kirkland Recreation Center.
- 28 February – WSSB, Durham, North Carolina, begins broadcasting on 1490 kHz with 250 W power (full-time).
- 29 February – KEXO, Grand Junction, Colorado, begins broadcasting on 1230 kHz with 250 W power (full-time).
- (undated) March – WGGG, Gainesville, Florida, begins broadcasting on 1230 kHz with 250 W power.
- (undated) – KICM, Mason City, Iowa, begins broadcasting on 1490 kHz with 250 W power (full-time).
- 1 March – WTAD-FM, Quincy, Illinois, begins broadcasting on 99.5 MHz.
- 1 March – KRIC-FM, Beaumont, Texas, begins broadcasting on 99.5 MHz.
- 8 March – WFGN, Gaffney, South Carolina, begins broadcasting on 1570 kHz with 250 W power (daytime).
- 11 March – WPDX-FM, Clarksburg, West Virginia, begins broadcasting on 95.1 MHz.
- 14 March – WMCP, Baltimore, Maryland, begins operation on 94.7 MHz.
- 15 March – WLIV-FM, Providence, Rhode Island, begins broadcasting on 107.7 MHz with 20 KW power.
- 21 March – KRLD-FM, Dallas, Texas, begins broadcasting on 92.5 MHz.
- 29 March – WTHT-FM, Hartford, Connecticut, begins broadcasting.
- 30 March – KNX-FM, Hollywood, California, begins broadcasting on 93.1 MHz.
- 30 March – WMOX-FM, Meridian, Mississippi, begins broadcasting on 98.6 MHz.
- 3 April – WUSN, Charleston, South Carolina, begins broadcasting on 1450 kHz with 250 W power (full-time).
- 3 April – KBEE-FM, Modesto, California, begins broadcasting on 103.3 MHz.
- 4 April – WCNB and WCNB-FM, Connersville, Indiana, begin broadcasting on 1580 kHz and 101.3 MHz, respectively.
- 14 April – WDXY-FM, Spartanburg, South Carolina, begins broadcasting on 100.5 MHz.
- 17 April -WPRO-FM, Providence, Rhode Island, begins broadcasting on 92.3 MHz.
- 19 April – WAMS and WAMS-FM, Wilmington, Delaware, begin broadcasting on 1380 kHz and 96.1 MHz, respectively.
- 22 April – WNAE-FM, Warren, Pennsylvania, begins broadcasting on 92.1 MHz.
- 24 April – KWOS-FM, Jefferson City, Missouri, begins broadcasting on 98.5 MHz.
- 25 April – KROX, Crookstown, Minnesota, begins broadcasting on 1050 kHz with 1 KW power (daytime).
- 25 April – KGLO-FM, Mason City, Iowa, begins broadcasting on 101.1 MHz.
- 25 April – WSAT, Salisbury, North Carolina, begins broadcasting on 1280 kHz with 1 KW power (daytime).
- (undated) May – KWAK begins broadcasting on 1240 kHz with 250 W power (full-time).
- 2 May – KENI, Anchorage, Alaska, begins broadcasting on 550 kHz with 5 KW power (full-time).
- 2 May – WOCB-FM, West Yarmouth, Massachusetts, begins broadcasting on 94.3 MHz.
- 2 May – WTYC, Rock Hill, South Carolina, begins broadcasting on 1150 kHz with 1 KW power (daytime).
- 3 May – KLX-FM, Oakland, California, begins broadcasting on 101.3 MHz.
- 6 May – WALE, Fall River, Massachusetts, begins broadcasting on 1400 kHz with 250 W power (full-time).
- 14 May – WLAL-FM, Lakewood, Ohio, begins broadcasting on 104.9 MHz.
- 15 May – WASA, Havre de Grace, Maryland, begins broadcasting on 1600 kHz with 500 W power (daytime).
- 16 May – KTLN, Denver, Colorado, begins broadcasting on 990 kHz with 1 KW power (daytime).
- 16 May – KSMI, Seminole, Oklahoma, begins broadcasting on 1260 kHz with 500 W power (daytime).
- 16 May – WMLS, Sylacauga, Alabama, begins broadcasting on 1290 kHz with 1 KW power (daytime).
- 23 May – WJLD-FM, Birmingham, Alabama, begins broadcasting on 104.7 MHz.
- 24 May – WWXL, Peoria, Illinois, begins broadcasting on 1590 kHz with 1 KW power (full-time).
- 27 May – WKTY, La Crosse, Wisconsin, begins broadcasting on 580 kHz with 1 KW power (full-time).
- 30 May – KAUS, Austin, Minnesota, begins broadcasting on 1480 kHz with 1 KW power (full-time).
- 6 June – KPOJ-FM, Portland, Oregon, begins broadcasting on 96.1 MHz.
- 6 June – WRVC, Norfolk, Virginia, begins broadcasting on 102.5 MHz.
- 10 June – WMRA, Myrtle Beach, South Carolina, begins broadcasting on 1450 kHz with 250 W power (unlimited).
- 15 June – KWNW, Wenatchee, Washington, a Don Lee Network affiliate, begins broadcasting on 1340 kHz with 250 W power.
- 19 June – WABB and WABB-FM, Mobile, Alabama, both Mutual affiliates, begin broadcasting on 1480 kHz and 107.9 MHz, respectively.
- 20 June – WPAY-FM, Portsmouth, Ohio, begins broadcasting on 104.1 MHz.
- 22 June – WNOW, York, Pennsylvania, begins broadcasting on 1250 kHz with 1 KW power (daytime).
- 29 June – KSDN, Aberdeen, South Dakota, begins broadcasting on 930 kHz with 1 KW power.
- 5 July – KMUS, Muskogee, Oklahoma, a Mutual affiliate, begins broadcasting on 1380 kHz.
- 9 July – WBCK, Battle Creek, Michigan, a Mutual affiliate, begins broadcasting on 930 kHz with 1 KW power (full-time).
- 11 July – WPJB, Providence, Rhode Island, begins broadcasting on 105.1 MHz.
- 11 July – WISN-FM, Milwaukee, Wisconsin, begins broadcasting on 102.9 MHz.
- 18 July – WACA, Camden, South Carolina, begins broadcasting on 1590 kHz with 1 KW power (daytime).
- 19 July – WLEU-FM, Erie, Pennsylvania, begins broadcasting on 97.9 MHz.
- 22 July – KAGH, Pasadena, California, begins broadcasting on 1300 kHz with 1 KW power (daytime).
- 25 July – KCSB, Liberal, Kansas, begins broadcasting on 1270 kHz with 1 KW power (daytime).
- 31 July – WHOC, Philadelphia, Mississippi, begins broadcasting on 1490 kHz with 1KW of power.
- 2 August – WHIN, Gallatin, Tennessee, begins broadcasting on 1010 kHz with 1 KW power (daytime).
- 10 August – WRVQ-FM, Richmond, Virginia, begins broadcasting on 94.5 MHz as an affiliate of WRVA.
- 16 August – WTAQ-FM, Green Bay, Wisconsin, begins broadcasting on 102.5 MHz with 14 KW power.
- 18 August – WXLW, Indianapolis, Indiana, begins broadcasting on 1590 kHz with 1 KW power (daytime).
- 26 August – WRJN-FM, Racine, Wisconsin, begins broadcasting on 100.7 MHz.
- 27 August – WXLW-FM, Indianapolis, Indiana, begins broadcasting on 94.7 MHz.
- 29 August – WSAU-FM, Wausau, Wisconsin, begins broadcasting on 95.5 MHz.
- 5 September – WHOL, Allentown, Pennsylvania, begins broadcasting on 1230 kHz.
- 19 September – WFTR, Front Royal, Virginia, begins broadcasting on 1450 kHz with 250 W power.
- 19 September – KFH-FM, Wichita, Kansas, begins broadcasting on 100.3 MHz.
- 26 September – WGEZ, Beloit, Wisconsin, begins broadcasting on 1490 kHz with 100 W power (full-time).
- October (undated) – WOC-FM, Davenport, Iowa, begins broadcasting at 103.7 MHz with 47 kW power.
- 6 October – WLLH-FM, Lowell, Massachusetts, begins broadcasting on 99.5 MHz.
- 26 October – KTNT-FM, Tacoma, Washington, begins broadcasting on 97.3 MHz.
- 27 October – KLTI and KLTI-FM, Longview, Texas, begin broadcasting on 1280 kHz and 105.9 MHz, respectively.
- 30 October – WJPS, Evansville, Indiana, begins broadcasting on 1330 kHz with power of 5 KW (daytime) and 1 KW (night).
- 1 November – WENY-FM, Elmira, New York, begins broadcasting on 106.9 MHz.
- 7 November – WCOP-FM, Boston, Massachusetts, begins broadcasting on 100.7 MHz.
- 14 November – WIBB, Macon, Georgia, begins broadcasting on 1280 kHz with 1 KW power (daytime).
- 21 November – KWKH-FM, Shreveport, Louisiana, begins broadcasting on 94.5 MHz.
- 29 November – KCKN-FM, Kansas City, Kansas, begins broadcasting on 106.7 MHz.
- 1 December – WHBL-FM, Sheboygan, Michigan, begins broadcasting on 100.3 MHz.
- 6 December = WGCH-FM, Greenwich, Connecticut, begins broadcasting on 95.9 MHz.
- 7 December – WVNJ, Newark, New Jersey, begins broadcasting on 620 kHz with 5 KW power (full-time)
- 12 December – WMTR, Morristown, New Jersey, begins broadcasting on 1250 kHz with 500 W power (daytime).
- 19 December – WGVM, Greenville, Mississippi, begins broadcasting on 1260 kHz with 1 KW power.

== Closings ==
- 4 January – The Adventures of Bill Lance ends its run on network radio.
- 22 January – Are These Our Children? ends its run on network radio (ABC).
- 6 February – Hop Harrigan ends its run on network radio (Mutual).
- 7 February – Hawk Larabee ends its run on network radio (CBS).
- 14 February - The Zane Grey Show ends its run on network radio (Mutual).
- 30 April – The American School of the Air ends its run on network radio (CBS)
- 23 May – The Fitch Bandwagon ends its run on network radio (NBC).
- 23 May – The Clock ends its run on network radio (ABC).
- 3 June - Radio Reader's Digest ends its run on network radio (NBC).
- 21 June – Charlie Chan ends its run on network radio (Mutual).
- 22 June – The Adventures of Christopher Wells ends its run on network radio (CBS).
- 29 June – Call for Music ends its run on network radio (CBS).
- 1 July – The Dick Haymes Show ends its run on network radio (CBS).
- 3 July – Joan Davis Time ends its run on network radio (CBS).
- 7 July – The American Melody Hour ends its run on network radio on (CBS).
- 23 August — The Amazing Mr. Tutt ends its run on network radio (CBS).
- 3 September – Believe It Or Not ends its run on network radio (NBC).
- 4 September – I Deal in Crime ends its run on network radio (Mutual).
- 27 November – Johnny Fletcher ends its run on network radio (ABC).

== Births ==
- 4 February – Alice Cooper, American rock singer, songwriter, musician and radio host.
- 14 February – Jackie Martling, American comedian and radio personality.
- 14 April – Rob Cowan, English classical music presenter.
- 22 April – Zoran Modli, Serbian radio presenter, pilot and writer (died 2020).
- 29 April – John Batchelor, American author and syndicated talk show host.
- 30 April – Chet Coppock, American sports radio broadcaster (died 2019).
- 27 May – Fritz Coleman, disc jockey, later weathercaster for KNBC-TV in Los Angeles, California.
- 9 June – Nick Clarke, English news presenter (died 2006).
- 2 August – Dennis Prager, American radio talk show host and author.
- 25 August – Harriett Gilbert, English radio arts presenter.
- 30 August – Robin Lustig, English radio news presenter.
- 20 September – Rey Langit, Filipino journalist, radio host.
- 2 December – Christine Westermann, German television, radio host, journalist and author.
- 22 December – Noel Edmonds, English broadcast presenter and producer.
- Paul Lewis, English financial broadcaster.

== Deaths ==
- 4 March – Antonin Artaud, 51, French playwright, actor and director
- 5 July – Carole Landis, 29, American actress (suicide)
- 24 November – Nellie Wallace, 78, British music hall performer
- Tom Breneman, 46, radio talk show host from 1941–1948, best known for the radio program, Breakfast in Hollywood.
