= Jeanine Ann Roose =

American psychologist and former child actress (1937–2021)

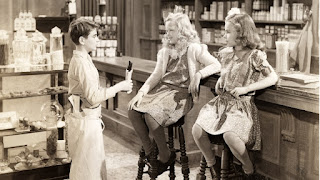
- image Jeanine Ann Roose, Jeanne Gail, and Robert J. Anderson in the 1946 film It's a Wonderful Life
- Born: October 24, 1937; Los Angeles, California, U.S.
- Died: December 31, 2021 (aged 84); Valley Village, Los Angeles, California, U.S.
- Education: University of California, Los Angeles
- Occupations: Actress; Jungian analyst
- Spouse: Eugene Richard Auger (m. 1964)
- Children: 1

Jeanine Ann Roose (October 24, 1937 – December 31, 2021) was an American child actress and psychologist.

== Early life and education ==
Roose was born on October 24, 1937, to Ivan R. and Agatha Roose.

Roose attended Audubon Junior High School. She later attended the University of California, Los Angeles, where she was a member of Alpha Delta Pi.

== Career ==
Her first job was on The Jack Benny Program at the age of eight; the role, as that of "Baby" or "Little" Alice Harris, is one she would keep for most of her entertainment career. She was also featured as a character on The Fitch Bandwagon and The Phil Harris-Alice Faye Show from 1946 to 1954. The character shared a name with the real-life daughter of Phil Harris and Alice Faye; the couple's two daughters did not wish to appear on the program.

Other radio appearances included playing Chris in the Lux Radio Theatre production of I Remember Mama and an episode of Mr. President with Edward Arnold. Her sole film credit was as young Violet Bick in the 1946 film classic It's a Wonderful Life. She also starred in the unaired television pilot Arabella's Tall Tales.

== Personal life ==
Roose married Eugene Richard Auger on September 4, 1964. She gave birth to one son, Joe. She also had four stepdaughters from her second marriage: Nancy, Janet, Linda, and Naomi, as well as six grandchildren and one great-grandson.

== Later life ==
She worked as a Jungian psychoanalyst in her later life.

== Death ==
She died from an abdominal infection in Valley Village, California, on December 31, 2021, at the age of 84.

== Works ==
- Roose Auger, Jeanine (1976). Behavioral Systems And Nursing. Prentice Hall. ISBN 9780130744845.
