= Virginia Hewitt =

American actress

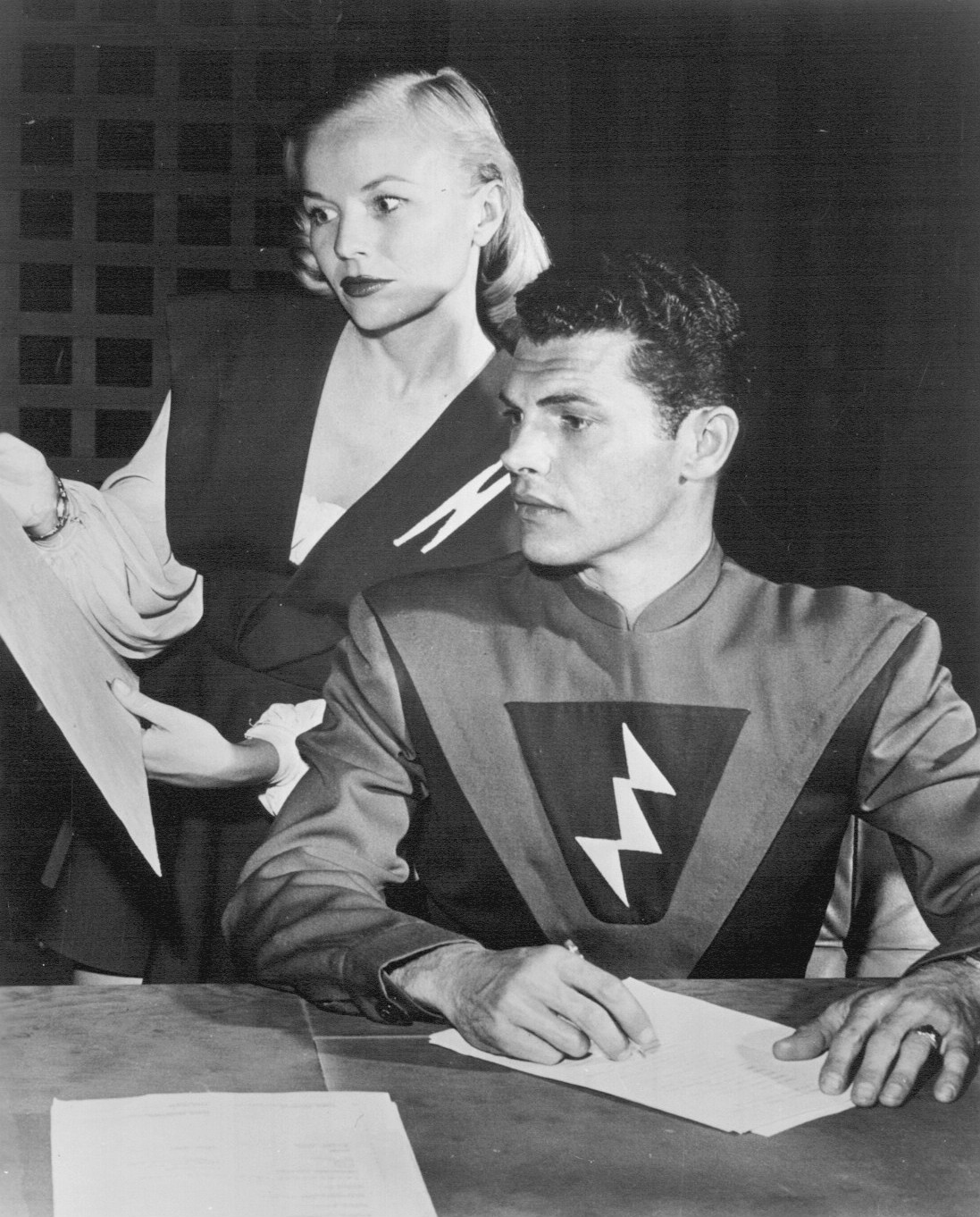
- Hewitt and Space Patrol co-star Ed Kemmer in the 1950s
- Born: November 28, 1925; Shreveport, Louisiana, U.S.
- Died: July 21, 1986 (aged 60); Los Angeles, California, U.S.
- Occupation: Actress
- Years active: 1949–1972
- Spouse: Ernst Meer (m. 1954; divorced?? 1970)

Virginia Hewitt (1925–1986) was an American actress who performed in films and television during the 1940s and early 1950s. She is best known for her role as "Carol Carlisle" in the 1950s TV series Space Patrol.

== Early years ==
Hewitt was born in Shreveport, Louisiana, in 1925 and was raised in Paola, Kansas, where her father worked as a superintendent for the Panhandle Eastern gas line company. When she was 22, she moved to Los Angeles to live with her sister who was employed as a secretary. Hewitt's career goal was to be a writer, "...but with her striking blond looks", Hewitt then 22, soon landed modeling jobs. After several talent scouts urged her to audition for movies, she decided to join a local theater group to hone her acting skills. Hewitt's first professional acting role was in the 1948 comedy My Dear Secretary. Producer Mike Moser, who was planning a TV space program, saw her in My Dear Secretary and hired her for Space Patrol.

== Film and television ==
Hewitt was active in film, television and radio from the late 1940s through the mid 1950s. After her divorce, she resumed her career in the early 1970s.

=== Space Patrol ===
Hewitt is best known for her role as Carol Carlisle in the 1950-1955 television science fiction serial, Space Patrol. Initially broadcast live on KECA-TV in the Los Angeles area as a daily 15 minute serial, it was later aired nationwide on Saturday mornings by ABC in 30 minute episodes.

A radio version of the show ran from 1952 to 1955, using the same cast, but employing more complex story lines, as radio broadcasts were not constrained by expensive studio sets. Along with Hewitt, the cast included Ed Kemmer as Commander-in-Chief Edward "Buzz" Corry, Lyn Osborn as Cadet Happy, Ken Mayer as Major Robbie Robertson, and Nina Bara as Tonga. Although Hewitt was famous for providing "blonde cheesecake appeal" to her Saturday morning fans, her character was also a scientist who could assemble an atomic bomb and navigate the universe. She was also the inventor of the "Agra Ray", a device that sped up plant life on barren planets. In the absence of male crew members, who were often engaged in various pursuits away from the spaceship, Carol could ably fill in as the spaceship's pilot. Hewitt's character was regarded as a role model for young girls in the 1950s.

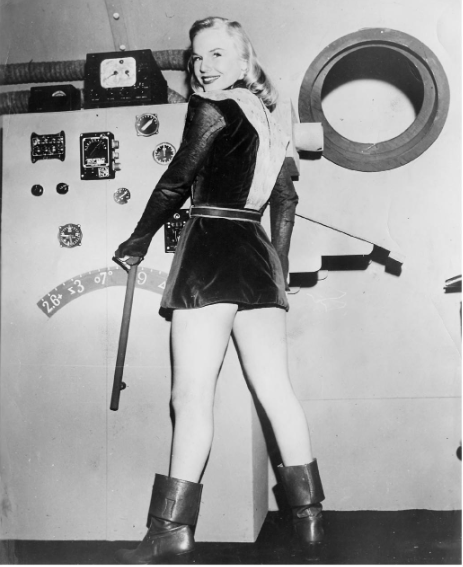
For many adult men, Hewitt provided "blonde cheesecake appeal" to what otherwise was a Saturday morning children's show

Explaining the success of the show, Hewitt said in a 1984 interview:

"The United States had come out of a dreadful time - the Depression and then five years tied up in a war. A lot of people were suffering from the loss of relatives, from the loss of limbs. And then we came along - a daily soap opera, pure escapism, fantasy. People loved the so-called relationship between Buzz and me. We could never kiss, but I was the only one on the show who could call him "Buzz" and be familiar with him. Sometimes he would put his arm around my waist: "Careful, Carol." But that was as far as we could go. People followed the continuing story of our lives, intertwined in the future, in space. Who would have dreamed, in those days, that in a few years there would be a Sputnik, and then somebody really up on the moon?"

=== Other film and television ===
Hewitt appeared in over a half-dozen other movies and TV shows during her career.

- My Dear Secretary (1948) - comedy starring Laraine Day and Kirk Douglas. Hewitt appeared in an uncredited role as "Felicia Adams". Her presence in the movie irritated Day who was said to be jealous of Hewitt's beauty and demanded that she be fired from the picture because she couldn't act, setting off what several columnists referred to as the "hottest feud in Hollywood". When the producers refused to fire Hewitt, Day left the set in protest, but returned two days later.
- Kimbar of the Jungle (1949) - failed television pilot, starring Hewitt as "Joan Winston", an American girl searching for her father who had gone missing in Africa while searching for uranium.
- The Flying Saucer (1950) - Hewitt had a minor role as a bar girl named "Nanette" in this independently-made science fiction movie.
- Bowery Battalion (1951) - comedy starring The Bowery Boys. Hewitt stars as "Marsha Levers", an undercover government agent posing as an Army secretary, trying to infiltrate a saboteur ring.
- The People Against O'Hara (1951) - uncredited role in this 1951 drama starring Spencer Tracy
- The Guardians (1971) - Hewitt appeared in Head of State as "Dame Henrietta Baxter" (S1E3).
- Thirty-Minute Theatre (1971) Hewitt appeared as "Mrs. Halstead" in And For My Next Trick (S7E27).

== Personal life ==
Hewitt dated co-star Lyn Osborn during their time on Space Patrol but broke off the relationship when she met, and subsequently married Ernst Meer, a noted Austrian designer. Space Patrol was cancelled soon after her marriage, and Hewitt abandoned her acting career. Instead, she focused her efforts on operating "Courant", a business started by Meer designing crystal chandeliers. The business became well-known in the Los Angeles area and allowed Hewitt to remain active in Hollywood social circles.

Reflecting on her time in Space Patrol, she told an interviewer in 1979, "In those days, when you were on a TV series, you really worked. The show was on six days a week, 52 weeks a year with absolutely no re-runs. And we did that for five years".

== Death ==
A heavy smoker, Hewitt died at the Cedars-Sinai Medical Center in Los Angeles, on July 21, 1986, at the age of 60 from cancer, leaving a brother and sister as the closest living relatives. Meer, who married Italian actress Irina Meleeva following his divorce to Hewitt, died after a lengthy illness on March 17, 1987.
