= F. W. Fitch =

American businessman (b. 1870, d. 1951)

- Born: Frederick Walter Fitch; January 28, 1870; Burnside, Iowa
- Died: October 1, 1951 (aged 81); Des Moines, Iowa
- Burial place: Highland Memory Gardens Cemetery
- Monuments: F. W. Fitch Company Historic District
- Years active: 1892-1949
- Known for: founder of The F.W. Fitch Company
- Spouse(s): Letitia Williams (married 1892 - divorced 1925); Gertrude Westberg (married 1926 - 1951)

Frederick Walter Fitch (1870–1951) was an American businessman who specialized in hair products.

== Early life ==
Frederick Walter Fitch was born January 28, 1870, at Burnside, Iowa to Lucius Henry Carey Fitch, a physician, and his wife, Mary Eleanor Epperson. Fitch wanted to be a doctor but without a high school education he was unable to enroll at the University of Iowa. He became a barber in Madrid, Iowa and developed hair formulas with the input of a man named Dr. Brechbill.

== The F.W. Fitch Company ==
Fitch founded F.W. Fitch Company in Boone, Iowa, in 1892, and also owned a barbershop. Fitch's first product was a hair tonic labeled "Ideal Hair Grower and Dandruff Cure." Later products included the "Fitch scientific scalp treatment."

Fitch moved his business to Des Moines at 15th and Walnut Streets in 1917; this district, F. W. Fitch Company Historic District, is now on the National Register of Historic Places.

The Fitch Company sponsored a national radio broadcast, The Fitch Bandwagon, from fall 1938 to spring 1948. It had three different formats. The first featured many popular musical acts in its early years, including Cab Calloway, Ozzie Nelson, Tommy Dorsey and Guy Lombardo. The second was a variety show starring Cass Daley that featured popular bands between skits. The third and best-remembered version starred Phil Harris and Alice Faye for a single and final season; they later spun The Fitch Bandwagon into their long-running show, The Phil Harris-Alice Faye Show.

The company did well throughout the early 20th century and during World War II but saw a decline in sales after the war due to the loss of military contracts.

In 1949, Fitch sold The F.W. Fitch Company to Grove Laboratories in St. Louis. The former F. W. Fitch Company building is now owned by Exile Brewing Company.

== Personal life and death ==
In 1892, Fitch married Letitia Williams. They had four children, sons Gail and Lucius, and daughters Lois and Mildred. Lucius created the Fitch Company subsidiary American Chemical Products Company around 1930.

The Fitches separated in 1923 and divorced in 1925. Then Fitch married Gertrude Westberg, who had been the family's maid.

Fitch died on October 1, 1951. He is buried at Highland Memory Gardens Cemetery in Des Moines.
