= The Phil Harris-Alice Faye Show =

American comedy radio program

- Alice Faye and Phil Harris in 1947 NBC promotional art by Sam Berman
- Running time: 30 minutes
- Country of origin: United States
- Language: English
- Home station: NBC
- Starring: Phil Harris; Alice Faye; Elliott Lewis
- Announcer: Bill Forman
- Created by: Al Lewis
- Written by: Ray Singer and Dick Chevillat, Joe Connelly and Bob Mosher, Ed James, Ray Brenner, Lou Derman, Jack Douglas, Marvin Fisher, Frank Gold, Al Schwartz, Phil Shuken
- Directed by: Paul Phillips
- Produced by: Paul Phillips
- Original release: October 3, 1948 – June 18, 1954
- No. of series: 8
- No. of episodes: 297

The Phil Harris-Alice Faye Show, was a comedy radio program which ran on NBC from 1948 to 1954 starring Alice Faye and Phil Harris. Harris had previously become known to radio audiences as the band-leader-turned-cast-member of the same name on The Jack Benny Program while Faye had been a frequent guest on programs such as Rudy Vallée's variety shows. After becoming the breakout stars of the music and comedy variety program The Fitch Bandwagon, the show was retooled into a full situation comedy, with Harris and Faye playing fictionalized versions of themselves as a working show business couple raising two daughters in a madcap home.

== Cast ==
- Phil Harris – A fictionalized version of himself as the co-star of a fictionalized version of the show.
- Alice Faye – A fictionalized version of herself as the co-star of a fictionalized version of the show.
- Elliott Lewis – Left-handed guitar player Frank Remley. The character was renamed Elliott Lewis in 1952.
- Jeanine Roose – Alice and Phil's elder daughter, called "Baby Alice" or "Little Alice", to distinguish her from her mother.
- Anne Whitfield – Phyllis, Alice and Phil's younger daughter. She takes after her father.
- Walter Tetley – Julius Abruzzio, the malevolent grocery boy.
- Robert North (in later seasons, John Hubbard) – Willie Faye, Alice's humorless younger brother/business manager.
- Gale Gordon – Mr. Scott, president of the Rexall Company (the show's sponsor) and therefore Phil's boss. When RCA became the sponsor, Mr. Scott was fired by Rexall, and hired by RCA.
- Lois Corbett – Mrs. Scott, Mr. Scott's wife.
- Sheldon Leonard – Grogan, a criminal thug, who sometimes takes it upon himself to "help" Phil.
- Dick Lane – Milligan, the fast-talking producer of a burlesque show. Was also the first actor to play Grogan.
- Alan Reed – Various guest roles, including a police officer.
- Martha Wentworth – Various guest roles, including Myrtle, the female wrestler.

=== Celebrity guests ===
Jack Benny, Mel Blanc, Andy Devine, Dean Martin and Jerry Lewis, Robert Taylor, Don Wilson, and Ed Kemmer & Lyn Osborn (Commander Corry & Cadet Happy, of Space Patrol) each made at least one guest appearance.

Character actors Frank Nelson and Joseph Kearns made periodic appearances, usually as store or desk clerks. At least once, Nelson used the Grogan name before Sheldon Leonard joined the cast.

== History ==
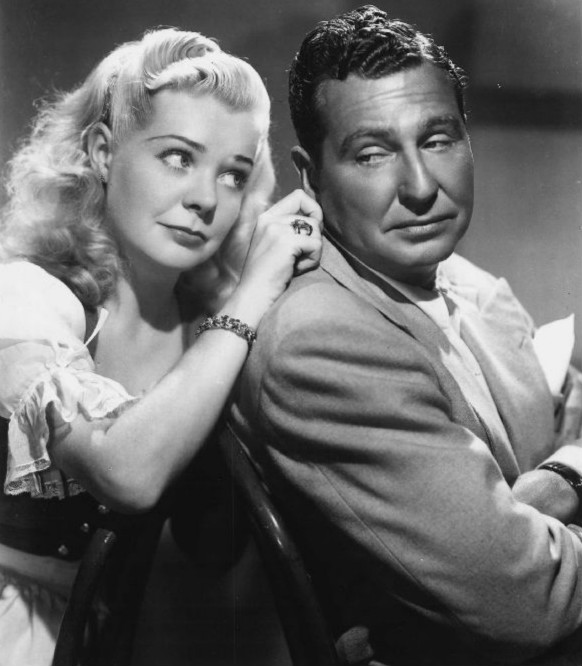
Harris and Faye in 1950

Since 1936 Harris had been a comedic mainstay and musical director for The Jack Benny Program; Faye had been a frequent guest on programs such as Rudy Vallée's. Their marriage provoked a 1941 episode of the Benny show.

In 1946, they were invited to co-host The Fitch Bandwagon, a musical variety and comedy show that had been a Sunday night fixture on NBC since 1938, featuring such orchestras as Tommy Dorsey, Jimmy Grier, Harry James, Freddy Martin and Jan Savitt and Harry Sosnik. In The Big Broadcast 1920–1950 Frank Buxton and Bill Owen wrote: "Even though many people thought that The Fitch Bandwagon was lucky to be sandwiched in between Jack Benny at 7pm and Edgar Bergen at 8pm on NBC, the [show] pioneered Sunday evening entertainment programming, because prior to its appearance most broadcasters felt that Sunday programming should be of a more religious or serious nature."

The growing popularity of the Harris-Faye family sketches turned the program into their own comic vehicle by 1947. When announcer Bill Forman hailed, "Good health to all... from Rexall!" on October 3, 1948, The Phil Harris-Alice Faye Show launched its independent life under Rexall's sponsorship with a debut storyline about the fictitious day the couple signed their sponsorship deal.

The show was a quick success, making the most of its position in the powerhouse NBC Sunday lineup. Playing themselves as radio and music star parents of two precocious young daughters (played by actresses Jeanine Roose and Ann Whitfield, instead of the Harrises' own young daughters), Harris refined his character from the booze-and-broads, hipster jive talker he had been on the Benny show into a vain buffoon but loyal husband who usually needed rescuing by Faye, his occasionally tart but always loving wife. References to his curly hair and vanity became a running gag.

Harris often passed wisecracks about buddy Frank Remley's taste for the spirits, a continuation of Harris' former Benny character. The show's writers, Ray Singer and Dick Chevillat, also used Faye's experience making the ill-fated film Fallen Angel as a source of meta-gags, writing her as a rich, in-demand starlet. In what is seen by historians as an ironic jab at her former studio, announcer Bill Forman closed each program with "Alice Faye appears through the courtesy of 20th Century Fox." In truth, Faye's contract had been torn up when she walked out rather than abide Darryl Zanuck cutting her scenes in favor of Linda Darnell.

Harris's radio character was also scripted as an occasional language and context mangler, six parts Gracie Allen and half a dozen parts Yogi Berra. ("Why, The Mikado never would have been written if Gilbert didn't have faith in Ed Sullivan!") The sardonic humor and debaucherous nightlife references that laced the show went beyond the gentility of another show which featured a bandleader and his singing wife, The Adventures of Ozzie and Harriet.

== Writing ==
Most of the surviving episodes from season one (1946–1947) were written by Joe Connolly and Bob Mosher. Ray Singer and Dick Chevillat wrote a few season one episodes, before becoming the show's only writers, from seasons 2 to 7 (1948–1953). At the end of season seven, they left to write the sitcom It's a Great Life for NBC TV.

The first 14 episodes of season eight (1953–1954), were written by a team of writers, singly and in pairs/trios: Ed James, Ray Brenner, Lou Dermon, Jack Douglas, Marvin Fisher, Frank Gold, Al Schwartz, and Phil Shuken. The rest of season eight was written by Jack Douglas and Marvin Fisher. The season eight episodes lack Willie, Mr. & Mrs. Scott, and Grogan.

Throughout the show's run, several episodes were re-done, re-worked, or completely rewritten, including the annual Christmas episode ("Hiring a Santa Claus"), "Donating Blood", "Build-It-Yourself TV Set", "Little Alice's First Date", and "Wallpapering".

== Sponsorship ==
Legendary character actor Gale Gordon appeared frequently as Mr. Scott, the slightly pompous and withering fictitious representative of actual sponsor Rexall. Each show was bookended by a serious Rexall commercial, narrated by a sonorous, sober-sounding "Rexall Family Druggist", played by veteran film supporting actor Griff Barnett. One running gag involved Scott's affected disdain for Harris, seeing his continued employment as an unfortunate necessity in order to keep Alice Faye on the show. Another involved Harris's continuous mis-identification of the Rexall brand (naming the company's trademark colors as pink and purple, rather than their familiar blue and orange, for example)—when he remembered them at all.

Rexall sponsored The Phil Harris-Alice Faye Show through 1950 when they moved to rival CBS' The Amos 'n' Andy Show. After a short period, RCA Victor picked up the show through the end of 1954, at which point Gale Gordon's Mr. Scott shifted to representing the new sponsor with the same satirical edge, but Mr. and Mrs. Scott disappeared after season 6.

The sponsorship switch to RCA also brought the Harrises a family pet: Nipper, the terrier with an ear cocked to a Victrola horn in the famous painting His Master's Voice, that served as RCA's logo for many years. Harris would sometimes address the dog with an allusion to the painting: "Sit, boy. Listen to your master's voice." In season eight, Nipper was replaced by Herman, a 180 lb. St. Bernard, whose barks were performed by Pinto Colvig.

== Music ==
Few episodes went without two music interludes, usually an upbeat or novelty number by Harris in his friendly baritone and a ballad or soft swinger by Faye in her affectionate contralto. Occasionally, they switched musical roles, Harris taking a ballad and Faye taking a hard swinger. Walter Scharf was the program's musical director until partway through season eight, when Skip Martin became the musical director. Also in season eight, Red Nichols and his Five Pennies provided dixieland-style accompaniment for Phil's songs.

The theme song was the 1926 jazz standard Sunday (music by Chester Conn; lyrics by Jule Styne, Bennie Krueger, and Ned Miller).

The show used "Rose Room" as the second theme tune following the first advertisement. This had been the theme on the 1932 "Phil Harris Show" of dance music.

Later episodes, sponsored by RCA Victor, used It's a Big Wide Wonderful World as the theme song. Many of these episodes were co-sponsored by Anacin.

== Harris and Faye ==
Though their on-air personae were that of a bumbling husband and exasperated wife, Harris and Faye's genuine love for each other was evident both on and off the air. Harris often rewrote song lyrics to reference Faye. And their marriage, a second for both, lasted 54 years until Harris' 1995 death.

Co-writer Ray Singer told Nachman that he and his partner Dick Chevillat thought they had a "writer's paradise" working for Harris and Faye: "Phil was the kind of guy who loved living, and didn't want to be bothered with work or anything else. He left us alone. We never had to report to him. He never knew what was gonna happen. And it was left in our hands. It spoiled us for everybody else."

Harris and Faye stayed with NBC rather than succumb to the CBS talent raids of the late 1940s that began when Benny was lured to CBS and took a few NBC stars (including George Burns and Gracie Allen) with him. NBC offered the couple (as well as Fred Allen) a lucrative new deal to stay, though occasionally Harris would allude to Benny's network switch on the Harris-Faye show. (Typically, Harris would crack an odd joke and then say, "I gotta give this one to Jackson! It might bring him back to NBC.") Despite the network conflict and a gruelling schedule, Harris continued to appear on Benny's show through 1952.

While several radio programs were being transferred to television during the show's lifetime, one episode ("The Television Test") comically exaggerated how terribly the audience would receive Phil on the small screen:

Producer 1 – "Do you think it's wise to let the public see what Harris looks like?"
Producer 2 – "Oh, he doesn't look that bad."

Harris and Faye were not averse to appearing on radio outside their comic personae. At the height of their radio show's popularity, the couple made a memorable appearance on the CBS mystery hit, Suspense, on the May 10, 1951 episode called "Death on My Hands". This performance was something of a family affair: Elliott Lewis was also the main director of Suspense during this period. The title alluded to an accidental shooting local people assumed to be murder. Harris played a touring bandleader playing a high school dance and accosted back at his hotel by an autograph-seeking girl. As she reached for a photo in an open suitcase, the suitcase fell to the floor, and a pistol inside discharged, shooting her to death and provoking a local lynch mob. Before the dance, he had bumped into Faye as his former band singer; after the dance, she sought to help him convince the town of the truth. The April 22, 1951, episode of the Harris-Faye Show gleefully parodied Suspense.

Harris and Faye also did the occasional stage tour during their radio years, including a tour with Jack Benny in the early 1950s. Nachman and other old-time radio chroniclers have noted the couple shied from television mostly because the pace and complexities of working the new medium would have been too time-consuming; radio allowed them, in effect, to work part-time while raising their children full-time.

== Supporting characters ==
Harris's character was often led into trouble by his buddy, left-handed guitarist Frank Remley. Frank Remley was the real name of a musician from the Jack Benny Program band, who was often mentioned on that program on jokes alluding to heavy drinking. Jeanine Roose, who portrayed Alice Jr. on the program, said about Lewis: "He and Phil would play off each other all the time; they had such good rapport and a genuine liking for each other." Lewis's portrayal of the character, along with the rest of the Harris-Faye format, began on The Fitch Bandwagon (1946–1948). Lewis was credited with saving the role, which had been filled by the real Frankie Remley for one episode. Frankie Remley taught Lewis to play a few guitar chords and allowed Lewis, who, like Remley, was left-handed, to use Remley's left-handed guitar for one episode.

When Benny moved his show from NBC to CBS in 1949, rights to use references to Remley supposedly went with him. Recordings of the shows indicate, however, that the Remley character was still used at least as late as April 12, 1952, (in the episode "Alice's Easter Dress") while "Elliott Lewis" was being used for the character in the November 23, 1952, episode ("Chloe the Golddigger"). Harris left Benny's show at the end of the 1951–52 season, and the Frankie Remley name was changed in the first episode of the 1952–53 season of the Harris-Faye Show (October 5, 1952), "Hotel Harris", in which the character claimed "Frankie Remley" was just his stage name, and he now wanted to go by his given name of "Elliott Lewis". According to Lewis, the name change happened after lawyers convinced the real Remley to seek payment for the use of his name. Lawyers for both sides fought it out, until Harris, in frustration, decided to just call the character "Elliott Lewis". Lewis observed, "Frankie Remley" is a funny-sounding name, but "Elliott Lewis" isn't.

While he was conducting interviews for his book Speaking of Radio, radio historian Chuck Schaden told Phil Harris and Elliott Lewis that their characters were as perfect of a team as Laurel and Hardy were on film and Gleason and Carney were to television.

Child impersonator Walter Tetley played obnoxious delivery boy Julius, who had sarcastic one-liners and malicious troublemaking for Harris and Remley, and a crush on Faye whom he often called his soulmate.

Robert North played Faye's fictitious, practical brother/business manager Willie, in season 1–7. John Hubbard briefly played Willie during season eight, until the character was replaced by Pops, Phil's bland and kindly old father (played by Richard LeGrand) who sounded remarkably like the old Rexall Family Druggist character.

== Truman inauguration ==
When Harris and his band were invited to perform at President Harry S. Truman's inaugural in January 1949, the Harris-Faye writers scripted a show in which Harris the character steamed over a lack of invitation to the Inaugural Ball. His character wasn't exactly thrilled to hear his wife warbling a Truman-friendly version of "I'm Just Wild About Harry", either. But at the show's end, Harris—who often shed his radio character to speak soberly promoting worthy causes (such as Big Brothers of America, which he saluted at the end of a 1950 show)—spoke humbly about how honored he was to have received the actual invitation, inviting the show's full cast and crew to join him for the festivities.

== Sources ==
- Jack Benny and Joan Benny, Sunday Nights at Seven: The Jack Benny Story. (New York: Warner Books, 1990.)
- John Dunning, On the Air: The Encyclopedia of Old-Time Radio. (New York: Oxford University Press, 1998).
- John Dunning, Tune in Yesterday: The Ultimate Encyclopedia of Old-Time Radio 1925–1976. (Englewood Cliffs, NJ, 1976.)
- Leonard Maltin, The Great American Broadcast: A Celebration of Radio's Golden Age (New York: Dutton/Penguin, 1997).
- Gerald S. Nachman, Raised on Radio. (New York: Pantheon Books, 1998.)
- Arthur Frank Wertheim, Radio Comedy. (New York: Oxford University Press, 1979).
