= WBCP =

Radio station in Urbana, Illinois

Coordinates: 40°07′35″N 88°17′25″W

Urbana, Illinois; United States
- Broadcast area: Champaign, Illinois
- Frequency: 1580 kHz
- Branding: WBCP 1580 AM

Programming
- Format: Defunct

Ownership
- Owner: P & C Enterprises Inc.

History
- First air date: 1948
- Former call signs: WKID (1948–1969); WCCR (1969–1984); WJTX (1984–1990)

Technical information
- Facility ID: 71211
- Class: D
- Power: 135 watts (day); 6 watts (night)

WBCP (1580 AM) was a radio station licensed to Urbana, Illinois and serving the Champaign, Illinois area. The station was last owned by P & C Enterprises, Inc.

== History ==
The station was established as a daytime only operation in 1948 as WKID. Callsigns were later changed to WCCR in 1969, WJTX in 1984, and WBCP in 1990. Nominated for a Gospel Stellar Award in 2017 for small market with one of the newest gospel show Lady Lynn Live Gospel Show. Lady Lynn Live as the Station Manager from 2009 to 2019, bringing notice to the gospel community.

In 2010, it was reported that WBCP's daytime power of 135 watts was the lowest for any licensed AM station in the United States. Its license expired December 1, 2020.
