= Ray Singer =

Ray Singer may refer to:

- Ray Singer (writer) (1916–1992), American writer and producer
- Ray Singer (record producer), British record producer and owner of Singer Records
