= The Sealtest Village Store =

The Sealtest Village Store may refer to:

- The Sealtest Village Store (1943-1945), a comedy radio program starring Joan Davis; see The Joan Davis Show § The Sealtest Village Store (1943-1945)
- The Sealtest Village Store (1947-1948), an early name of The Jack Carson Show
