= That's What I Like About the South =

1945 song by Phil Harris and Andy Razaf

"That's What I Like About the South" (actual title "That's What I Like 'Bout the South") is the signature song of Phil Harris written by Andy Razaf and covered by Bob Wills and Cliff Bruner. Harris sang it in the 1945 film I Love a Bandleader, and performed it several times as part of The Jack Benny Program. Harris himself was born in Linton, Indiana, but spent much of his early life in Nashville, Tennessee.

The lyrics reference many different foods that are typically identified as Cuisine of the Southern United States, such as Virginia hams, candied yams, and black-eyed peas.

There seem to be two versions of this song, with different music. One by Andy Razaf and the other by Phil Harris. Here are the lyrics of the first verse as written by Andy Razaf (copyright 1944):

“Fried chicken, nice and sweet,
Cornpone and possum meat,
Mince pie that can’t be beat;
That’s what I like ‘bout the South.” (Note the word “‘bout.”)

Here are the lyrics of the first verse as sung by Phil Harris, which first appeared in the movie, I Love a Bandleader (1945): Phil Harris first recorded his signature tune, "That's What I Like About the South" (originally credited as "The Groove Song"), on March 31, 1937. Released on the Vocalion label (Vocalion 3583), this initial 78 rpm record featured a more relaxed, swinging tempo than the famous upbeat versions he popularized later it became his signature tune and a staple of his performances on The Jack Benny Program.

https://www.youtube.com/watch?v=feWeLlWII4o

Phil's version first appeared, Jack Benny radio show, 1941-02-02 Herbert Marshall Hosts The Show

“Won't you come with me to Alabamy
Let's go see my dear old mammy
She's frying eggs and broilin' hammy
That's what I like about the South.” (Note the word “about.”)
