= My Dear Secretary =

1948 film

- Poster of the film
- Directed by: Charles Martin
- Written by: Charles Martin
- Produced by: Leo C. Popkin
- Starring: Laraine Day; Kirk Douglas; Keenan Wynn; Helen Walker
- Cinematography: Joseph F. Biroc
- Edited by: Arthur H. Nadel
- Music by: Heinz Roemheld
- Distributed by: United Artists
- Release date: 5 November 1948
- Running time: 94 minutes
- Country: United States
- Language: English

My Dear Secretary is a 1948 American comedy film written and directed by Charles Martin (1910-1983) and starring Laraine Day, Kirk Douglas, Keenan Wynn, and Helen Walker. The supporting cast features Rudy Valee, Alan Mowbray and Irene Ryan.

== Plot ==
The full film

Successful novelist and playboy Owen Waterbury hires aspiring writer Stephanie 'Steve' Gaylord as his secretary; a dream come true for Steve who admires Owen and his work, and is herself an aspiring author. Steve soon finds out that the egomaniacal Owen has gone through a series of secretaries who have left when they are fed up with his behaviour. He is constantly in debt and cannot begin to write a contracted novel that will pay his bills including a lucrative advance by his publisher. Steve and Owen end up marrying, and Steve perseveres until Owen's novel, based on the events of his life and that mentions a character based on his publisher shown in an unflattering light, is refused publication.

Owen claims he cannot have a wife who is his secretary, so he fires his wife/secretary and goes back to his old ways, hiring an admiring and attractive female to be his secretary. In the meantime, Steve takes her own now-completed novel and also Owen's rejected manuscript to her former employer, Charles Harris, who is a major publisher and is romantically attracted to Steve. Harris agrees to read both manuscripts.

Harris finds Owen's manuscript interesting but ordinary, but believes Steve's manuscript to be not only worthy of publication but a serious candidate for literary prizes. Steve initially refuses publication because she feels it would hurt Owen's already fragile ego, but soon changes her mind because of Owen's continued philandering. Steve goes on to be a best-selling author, causing Owen extreme annoyance. She hires an attractive male secretary, after which Owen snaps and insists that he will be her secretary. Steve agrees and begins to narrate a book to Owen based on their life together. Owen strongly objects to the way she describes him and they get into another argument, but end up getting back together.

== Cast ==
- Laraine Day as Stephanie 'Steve' Gaylord
- Kirk Douglas as Owen Waterbury
- Keenan Wynn as Ronnie Hastings
- Helen Walker as Elsie
- Rudy Vallee as Charles Harris
- Florence Bates as Horrible Hannah Reeve
- Alan Mowbray as Deveny
- Helene Stanley as Miss 'Clay' Pidgeon
- Irene Ryan as Mary
- Gale Robbins as Dawn O'Malley
- Grady Sutton as Sylvan Scott
- Virginia Hewitt as Felicia Adams
