= WGVM =

- Greenville, Mississippi; United States
- Frequency: 1260 kHz
- Branding: Classic Hits 1260 AM★97.3 FM

Programming
- Language: English
- Format: Classic hits

Ownership
- Owner: Monte Spearman and Gentry Todd Spearman; (High Plains Radio Network, LLC)
- Sister stations: WDMS

History
- First air date: December 1948
- Call sign meaning: GreenVille, Mississippi

Technical information
- Licensing authority: FCC
- Facility ID: 41838
- Class: D
- Power: 2,400 watts day 32 watts night
- Transmitter coordinates: 33°25′20″N 91°01′41″W
- Translator: 97.3 W247BA (Indianola)

Links
- Public license information: Public file; LMS
- Website: www.hpr.network/mississippi

WGVM (1260 AM) is an American radio station licensed to serve the community of Greenville, Mississippi, United States. The station was established in 1948 by David M. Segal and owned by him for nearly six decades. WGVM is currently owned and operated by Monte Spearman and Gentry Todd Spearman, through licensee High Plains Radio Network, LLC.

The station began with an eclectic array of live programming including blues and Gospel music, transitioned to rockabilly-influenced Top 40 in the 1950s, and became a top-rated country music station in the 1960s and 1970s. WGVM's fortunes followed the general decline of AM radio stations in the United States and the station went off the air for several months in 2006 before finding a new owner and a new direction. WGVM now serves the "Ark-La-Miss" region with a classic hits format.

== Programming ==
WGVM broadcasts a classic hits format to the "Ark-La-Miss" region bounded by Pine Bluff, Arkansas, to the northwest, Batesville, Arkansas, to the northeast, Monroe, Louisiana, to the southwest, and Jackson, Mississippi, to the southeast. WGVM is a Class D "AM daytimer", restricted to broadcasting only during daylight hours to protect the nighttime coverage areas of more powerful regional Class B stations and other local Class D stations. The station switched to sports programming when WGVM returned to the air after it was sold in 2006.

WGVM was an affiliate of the Fox Sports Radio network and receives select programs from the ESPN Radio and Premiere Radio networks until July 2013. In addition to sports talk programming, the station airs live sports as part of the Southern Miss Golden Eagles' baseball and football radio networks and as part of the Ole Miss Rebels baseball and men's basketball radio networks. The station also broadcasts coach's shows from both schools.

== History ==
=== Early days ===
WGVM 'Top 40' survey for April 27, 1959

The station launched in December 1948 with 1,000 watts of power on 1260 kilohertz as the second radio station licensed to serve Greenville, Mississippi. The station was assigned the call sign "WGVM" by the Federal Communications Commission (FCC). This was Greenville's second radio station as WJPR (now WNIX, 1330 AM) signed on in 1937. WGVM was founded by owner David M. Segal who also served as general manager. Other key personnel at launch included Merle Stein as station manager and Welton H. Jetton as chief engineer.

=== 1950s ===
By 1950, the broadcast license was transferred to a new company, the Cotton Belt Broadcasting Company, owned by Segal who was also the company's president. By 1953, the name of the company was changed to Cotton Belt Broadcasting Corporation of Mississippi to reflect the fact that WGVM was now part of the Cotton Belt Group, seven radio stations across Texas, Arkansas, Missouri, and Mississippi that were all owned or controlled by David M. Segal. Just two years later, the company name was changed to Mid-America Broadcasting Company, reflecting the shift in location of the other stations in the group. Segal now controlled just four stations with two in Missouri and one each in Colorado and Mississippi.

==== People ====
Turnover in key positions was steady through the 1950s with Howard E. Gurney assuming the general manager role and Louis A. Kurtz as program director by 1950. By 1951, David M. Segal resumed his general manager role and Wallace Hoy became WGVM's program director. In late 1953, Wayne McChristian became the station's chief engineer. In 1956, Joseph C. Gunter was named chief engineer for the station and Jack R. Stull took on both the general manager and commercial manager roles. However, just two years later Edward M. Guss was brought in as general manager and Stull moved to the commercial manager slot full-time.

==== Music ====
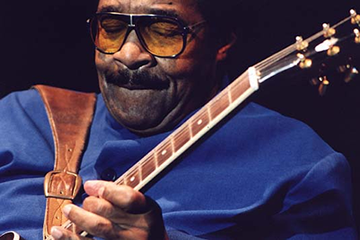
Little Milton performing in 2002

WGVM initially featured a variety of musical styles, including live blues music programs plus Gospel music on Sundays. Early show hosts included future blues legends Willie Love and Little Milton. Regular Sunday performers included the Famous St. John Gospel Singers whose young guitarist, Riley King, would later find fame in Memphis as the "Blues Boy of Beale Street" and become known as B.B. King.

In the late 1950s, WGVM aired a rockabilly-influenced Top 40 radio format featuring artists such as Elvis Presley, Ricky Nelson, and Frankie Avalon. Along with the Top 40 songs, WGVM continued to program blocks of Gospel, blues, and rhythm and blues music (lumped together in broadcast industry publications of the day as "Negro music") with roughly 30 hours per week in 1958 but just over 22 hours per week in 1959.

=== 1960s ===
In 1961, after a decade under Wally Hoy, WGVM brought in James B. Ashley as program director and split off the news director role to David Smith. James Jared Tugwell became the station's new chief engineer. Also in 1961, the station was granted a construction permit by the FCC to increase its signal strength from 1,000 watts to 5,000 watts, still restricted to daylight-only operation. The station began broadcasting with the stronger signal by 1963. Joel Netherland was hired as program director and news director in 1966. By 1968, those duties would be split again as Cal Adams became program director and Bill Brown was hired as news director. Also in 1968, Robert Meador became WGVM's chief engineer. Adams and Brown's tenure would prove short-lived as Art Baca became program director in 1969 with Andy Roberts taking the news director position.

In the 1960s the station flipped to country music which proved a boon to the station's ratings. The format switch meant a decrease in "Negro music" programming from 24.5 hours per week in 1963 to just 16 hours per week, mostly on weekends, by 1965. This programming would continue to disappear from WGVM with just three hours per week by 1967 and the station reporting itself as "100%" country & western in 1968.

In December 1967, sister station WGVM-FM (100.7 FM) signed on the air as a simulcast of WGVM during daylight hours and continuing a similar country music format at night and overnight. By 1970, the FM station was renamed WDMS after owner David M. Segal and derived only 25% of its programming from WGVM.

=== Musical changes ===
In September 1973, program director Chuck Alan moved on to KRMD (1340 AM) in Shreveport, Louisiana, and Burt Brown moved up into the position for WGVM. Brown told Billboard that he would "soften" the top-ranked station's country format in an effort to appeal to a younger demographic. In the late 1990s, the station shifted again, this time to an older-skewing classic country format.

In addition to its regular music programming, in 1999 WGVM broadcast college football games as a member of both the Delta State Statesmen and Southern Miss Golden Eagles sports radio networks. Sports broadcasts continued into the early 2000s as the station broadcast University of Southern Mississippi men's basketball and football plus National Football League games as a member of the Tennessee Titans, and later New Orleans Saints, radio networks.

=== Falling silent ===
On May 11, 2006, WGVM ceased broadcasting temporarily while a search for a new owner for the station was conducted. Station ownership told the FCC that station founder and primary owner David M. Segal was elderly and suffering "some health issues" which made it difficult to oversee station operations from his California residence. In addition, the station was having "a difficult time" retaining managers and sales people plus the money saved by taking WGVM off the air temporarily would be used to speed the process of finding a buyer for the ailing station.

In July 2006, a buyer was found with John R. Salyer and Wesley K. Gerald teaming up with WGVM's then-current general manager Robert J. "Bob" Ghetti to form a new corporation, WDMS Inc. The new company agreed to purchase both WGVM and FM sister station WDMS from Segal's Mid-America Broadcasting Company for a combined sales price of $780,000. The FCC approved the transaction on September 15, 2006, and the deal was formally consummated on November 9, 2006. This ended nearly six decades of continuous WGVM ownership by station founder David M. Segal.

=== New beginning ===
WGVM returned to the air in late 2006 under new ownership and with a new format: sports and sports talk as an affiliate of ESPN Radio. While the primary network affiliation later switched to Fox Sports Radio, WGVM has maintained this sports radio format since the 2006 return to the air.

In 2008, John Rickey Salyer, the majority owner of license-holder WDMS Inc., filed for bankruptcy protection. At the time of the filing, Salyer owned 57% of the company, Robert J. Ghetti owned 18%, and Wesley K. Gerald owned 25%. Control of WGVM was involuntarily transferred from Salyer to Jeffrey A. Livingston as an interim trustee in May 2008. In June 2008, Livingston reached an agreement to transfer Salyer's share of the corporation to Robert J. Ghetti as a partial resolution of Salyer's debts. The voluntary transfer of control was approved by the FCC on July 22, 2008, and the deal was formally consummated on September 11, 2008. Righetti now owned 75% of WDMS Inc. with Wesley K. Gerald retaining his 25% stake.

WGVM and sister station WDMS were sold by WDMS Inc. to ARK-LA-MS Radio Group, LLC effective July 5, 2012 in exchange for payments and assumption of bank debt worth $734,231. Both stations were sold again effective November 21, 2016 to High Plains Radio Network, LLC for $500,000.

== Station alumni ==
Along with his work with Sonny Boy Williamson on King Biscuit Time in the late 1940s, Delta blues pianist Willie Love became the host of his own radio show on WGVM. Love, after years of heavy drinking, died in August 1953 at the age of 46.

Before receiving his first recording contract with Sun Records in 1953 and going on to become "one of the world’s leading performers of blues and soul music" as a singer and guitarist, "Little Milton" Campbell hosted a program on WGVM. Little Milton would go on to be inducted into the Blues Hall of Fame in 1988.

In November 1959, WGVM program director Wallace "Wally" Hoy was elected to the board of directors of the Disk Jockey Association. The DJA was founded in Chicago in 1957.

Joe Ray, then general manager of WGVM and sister station WDMS, served as president of the Mississippi Association of Broadcasters for the 1981 calendar year.
