= WDMS =

- Greenville, Mississippi; United States
- Frequency: 100.7 MHz

Programming
- Format: Country
- Affiliations: Westwood One

Ownership
- Owner: Monte Spearman and Gentry Todd Spearman; (High Plains Radio Network, LLC)
- Sister stations: WGVM

History
- First air date: December 1967
- Former call signs: WGVM-FM (1967–1970)
- Call sign meaning: David M. Segal (former owner)

Technical information
- Licensing authority: FCC
- Facility ID: 41846
- Class: C1
- ERP: 100,000 watts
- HAAT: 135 meters (443 ft)
- Transmitter coordinates: 33°25′20″N 91°01′41″W

Links
- Public license information: Public file; LMS
- Webcast: Listen Live
- Website: wdms.fm

WDMS (100.7 FM) is an American radio station licensed to Greenville, Mississippi, United States. The station is currently owned by Monte Spearman and Gentry Todd Spearman, through licensee High Plains Radio Network, LLC. WDMS transmits with 100,000 watts effective radiated power from an antenna 135 meters (442.9 feet) height above average terrain located in Greenville, Mississippi.

Previous logo

== Engineer death ==
In August 2010, Jerold Campbell, a contract engineer for WDMS was fatally electrocuted while working on the station's transmitter.
