= Bill Forman (radio) =

American radio announcer and actor (1915–1966)

Bill Forman (1915–1966) was an American radio announcer and actor. He was best known for his work as the title character on The Whistler.

== Early life ==
Forman was born Raymond L. Forman on May 26, 1915 in Mount Vernon, New York. His father was a Methodist minister. He attended Wesleyan University, where he majored in English and theatre. John Golden discovered him and cast him in a play in New York. Forman later reported having been in six flop plays that year.

== Career ==
Forman worked for WHBC in Canton, Ohio and then for WGAR in Cleveland, Ohio before he moved to Los Angeles to work at KMPC, where he succeeded Lou Huston, in 1942. During his career, Forman was known as the "dean" and for his many accents on Kay Kyser's Kollege of Musical Knowledge.

Forman appeared on The Whistler starting in 1941. He once stated he never missed a broadcast. According to a 1990 newspaper article, he did not provide the whistling of his character. He starred in the television adaptation of The Whistler which aired for one season beginning in 1954.

Forman also announced and narrated for various radio shows. He was the narrator on The Zane Grey Show and the announcer on The Phil Harris-Alice Faye Show; its predecessor, The Fitch Bandwagon; Richard Diamond, Private Detective; The Charlie McCarthy Show; and The Tony Martin Show.

In addition to his work on broadcast and radio, Forman contributed vocal work to several films, including Wilbur the Lion (1947) and The Pride of St. Louis (1952).

== Personal life and death ==
Forman was inducted into the military at Fort MacArthur in 1945.

Forman was married and had three children. He enjoyed golf, cooking, and Sherlock Holmes stories and films. Forman was a friend of Frank Lovejoy.

He died on April 25, 1966.
