= Ray Singer (writer) =

American writer and producer (1916–1992)

Ray Singer (1916–1992) was an American writer and producer who worked in radio, film, and television.

Singer was from New York. He was one of four sons and a daughter born to an ambitious ladies' garment entrepreneur who would keep his large family in America's middle class. One of his brothers was the boxer Al Singer. He wrote for radio shows such as The Rudy Vallée Show, The Joan Davis Show, and The Fred Allen Show.

He and Dick Chevillat first collaborated on The Joan Davis Show and were known for The Phil Harris-Alice Faye Show. They later worked on films such as Neptune's Daughter and television shows such as The Frank Sinatra Show. They created the television show It's a Great Life.

Singer, a member of the Writers Guild of America, was active on the Guild's age discrimination committee. He taught film and television writing at UCLA and in the California State University system.

He died in 1992.
