= Dick Chevillat =

American media writer and producer (1905–1984)

Dick Chevillat (December 31, 1905 – May 10, 1984) was an American writer and producer who worked in radio, film, and television.

Early in his career, Chevillat wrote for The Jack Benny Program and for the Marx Brothers, and then for Sealtest-sponsored radio programs The Rudy Vallée Show and The Joan Davis Show, on which he was teamed with Ray Singer (writer). With Singer he would write for many programs, including The Phil Harris-Alice Faye Show, on which they refined the characters of Phil Harris and Frank Remley. Alice Faye reportedly broke her arm in a game of charades at Chevillat's Encino home in 1947.

Chevillat and Singer worked on television shows such as It's a Great Life and The Frank Sinatra Show and on films including Neptune's Daughter (1949) and Viva Las Vegas (1964). Chevillat and Singer ceased working together in 1966.

Then Chevillat wrote/consulted on 152 episodes of Green Acres. He received story credit for Gordy (1995), which he and Jay Sommers originally wrote with Arnold the Pig from Green Acres in mind, posthumously.

He died of lung cancer on May 10, 1984, in Los Angeles at age 78.
