= F. W. Fitch Company Historic District =

Historic district in Iowa, United States

- U.S. National Register of Historic Places
- U.S. Historic district
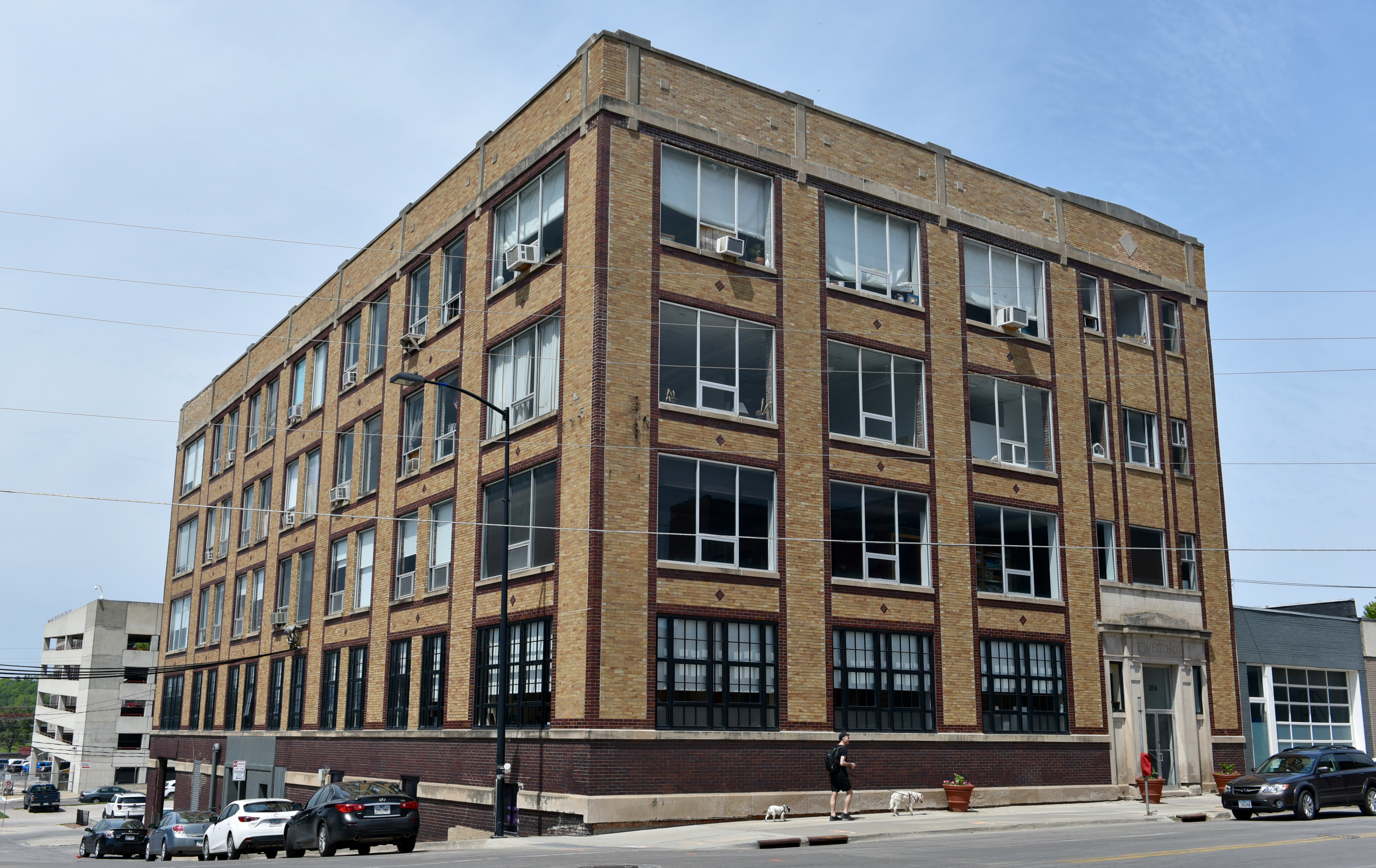
- The Main Building

- Location within Iowa Location within the United States
- Location: 300–306 15th and 1510–1526 Walnut Sts., Des Moines, Iowa
- Coordinates: 41°35′00″N 93°38′13″W
- Area: less than one acre
- Built: 1917, 1929, 1942, 1944
- Architectural style: Commercial Style
- NRHP reference No.: 13000147
- Added to NRHP: April 9, 2013

The F. W. Fitch Company Historic District is a nationally recognized historic district located in Des Moines, Iowa, United States. It was listed on the National Register of Historic Places in 2013. At the time of its nomination the district consisted of five resources, including three contributing buildings, one contributing structure, and one non-contributing building. The industrial buildings were built piecemeal between 1917 and 1944 on the west side of the central business district. The main building (1917) and its addition (1929) are located on the north side of Walnut Street, and the soap plant (1929 & 1942) and the soap plant annex (1944) are located on the south sides of Walnut Street. The contributing structure is a tunnel under Walnut that was built either in 1929 or 1942.

The F. W. Fitch Company, which manufactured personal care products, occupied the buildings between 1917 and 1949. They dominated much of the shampoo industry from the 1920s through the mid-1940s. They and the Carl Weeks' Armand Co., a national cosmetics and perfume manufacturer, gave the city a reputation as a leader in the United States for the personal care products industry. The country's changing grooming styles and the end of military contracts after World War II led to the company's demise. They sold all of their assets to Grove Laboratories of St. Louis in 1949. The Fitch family, however, continued to hold the title to the main building into the 1970s when Building Maintenance Services (BMS) bought it. The building housed artists and other design professionals. It was almost torn down in the early 21st century, but it was spared. Various enterprises have been housed in the soap plant and its annex.
