= The Whistler (TV series) =

American anthology TV series (1954)

The Whistler is a 30-minute syndicated American television anthology mystery series, based on the radio series of the same name.

Produced by Lindsley Parsons and CBS Films, 39 episodes were syndicated beginning in 1954, with Signal Oil and Lipton Tea as sponsors. Bill Forman was both narrator and the voice of "The Whistler", and Dorothy Roberts whistled the theme. Both reprised their roles from the radio series. The "Backfire" episode starred Lon Chaney Jr. Notable guest stars included Maureen O'Sullivan, Miriam Hopkins, Patric Knowles, Howard Duff, and John Ireland.

== Partial list of episodes ==
Date	Title of Episode	Star(s)
October 15, 1954	"A Friendly Case of Blackmail"	Paul Kelly; Ann Doran.
September 18, 1955	"The Glass Dime"	Robert Hutton; Eve Miller; Darlene Fields
February 5, 1956	"The Other Hand"	John Howard; Pauline Crell; Ann Seaton
February 12, 1956	"Cup of Gold"	Tom Brown; Barbara Woodell; Walter Sande
February 19, 1956	"Cancelled Flight"	Barbara Woodell; Walter Sande; Richard Arlen
