= The Fitch Bandwagon =

- Running time: 30 minutes
- Country of origin: United States
- Language: English
- Home station: NBC
- Hosted by: Dick Powell (ca. 1944)
- Starring: Cass Daley (1945-1946); Phil Harris (1946-1948); Alice Faye (1946-1948); Elliott Lewis (1946-1948)
- Announcer: Dresser Dahlstead (ca. 1939); Wendell Niles; Tobe Reed (1942-1945); Larry Keating (1945-1946); Bill Forman (1946-1948)
- Directed by: Paul Phillips (1946-1948)
- Produced by: Ward Byron; Bill Lawrence (ca. 1944)
- Original release: September 4, 1938 – May 23, 1948
- No. of series: 10

The Fitch Bandwagon was an American radio show that aired on NBC from 1938 to 1948. It was sponsored by the F.W. Fitch Shampoo Company, an Iowa-based manufacturer of hair care products. It aired on Sunday evenings at 7:30 p.m.

The Fitch Bandwagon had three different incarnations over its decade on the radio.

Beginning with its premiere in fall 1938 through spring 1945, it was a bandstand style show. Freddy Martin, Jan Savitt, Harry James, Tommy Dorsey, and other top bandleaders appeared and played popular tunes.

From fall 1945 through spring 1946, it was a musical variety show starring Cass Daley and co-starring Francis “Dink” Trout and Henry Russell. Popular bands performed between skits.

The Fitch Bandwagon is best remembered for its final two seasons, from fall 1946 through spring 1948, as a situation comedy show starring real-life husband and wife Phil Harris of The Jack Benny Program and movie star Alice Faye. Harris and Faye played fictionalized versions of themselves and Elliott Lewis, Robert North, Jeanine Roose, Anne Whitfield, and Walter Tetley were featured as their family and associates. This evolved into The Phil Harris-Alice Faye Show, which premiered in fall 1948, sponsored by Rexall.
