= I Love a Bandleader =

1945 film directed by Del Lord

- Directed by: Del Lord
- Written by: Paul Yawitz; John Grey
- Produced by: Michael Kraike
- Starring: Phil Harris; Eddie 'Rochester' Anderson; Leslie Brooks
- Cinematography: Franz Planer
- Edited by: James Sweeney
- Music by: Mischa Bakaleinikoff
- Production company: Columbia Pictures
- Distributed by: Columbia Pictures
- Release date: September 13, 1945
- Running time: 70 minutes
- Country: United States
- Language: English

I Love a Bandleader is a 1945 American musical comedy film directed by Del Lord and starring Phil Harris, Eddie 'Rochester' Anderson and Leslie Brooks.

== Main cast ==
- Phil Harris as Phil Burton
- Eddie 'Rochester' Anderson as Newton H. Newton
- Leslie Brooks as Ann Stuart
- Walter Catlett as B. Templeton James
- Frank Sully as Dan Benson
- James Burke as Charles Gibley
- Pierre Watkin as Dr. Gardiner
- The Four Vees as The Jordan Sisters

== Bibliography ==
- Foster, Charles. Stardust and Shadows: Canadians in Early Hollywood. Dundurn, 2000.
