= WATO (AM) =

Radio station in Oak Ridge, Tennessee (1948–2010)

- Oak Ridge, Tennessee; United States
- Broadcast area: Knoxville, Tennessee
- Frequency: 1290 kHz

Programming
- Format: Talk radio

Ownership
- Owner: Sheepdog Broadcasting Corporation

History
- First air date: February 1, 1948
- Last air date: April 2010
- Former call signs: WOKE (1948–1959)

WATO (1290 AM) was a radio station in Oak Ridge, Tennessee. The call letters were chosen for the first three letters in "Atomic City" as Oak Ridge was known at the time of the Manhattan Project. WATO was licensed to broadcast at 5 kW during daytime hours and 500 watts at night. It broadcast at 1 kW during daylight hours and 125 watts at night from a temporary site while looking for a new permanent home.

== History ==
The station commenced broadcasting, as WOKE on February 1, 1948, under the authority of the U.S. Atomic Energy Commission. It was the first radio station to be established on a U.S. military reservation. Initially it broadcast on 1490 kHz, but it moved to 1290 kHz on January 24, 1959, when the original owners bought out WOKE.

Broadcasts of Oak Ridge High School football games were a staple of its programming from 1948 through 2007. The station broadcast a total of 678 consecutive high school games.

The format was easy listening oldies at one time.

The station went off the air in March 2008 when one of its three 200-foot (61 m) transmission towers fell during a storm. Its owner, Horne Radio, determined that it would be financially infeasible to return the station to the air. In October 2008 Horne announced that it would sell WATO's transmission site and would surrender the station's broadcasting license to the Federal Communications Commission (FCC). On February 19, 2009, the FCC granted an application to temporarily move the transmitter site, with reduced power, to a site 5 miles (8.0 km) west of the original transmitter site, broadcasting from a tower formerly used by WORI which is now silent. There was also an application on file for a change of ownership.

Ann and Larry Walden of Lenoir City, Tennessee, purchased WATO and brought it back on the air August 26, 2009; the new format included a talk show, Oak Ridge High School sports, music, and more. Lipstick Lingo, hosted by Martha Woodward, also aired on WATO Radio.

In the first week of April 2010, WATO again ceased broadcasting, this time due to the owners of the land and its transmitting equipment selling off the property to a hotel developer. Because of economic conditions, the owners of WATO could not afford to buy its own property or equipment. The owners placed its license up for sale, however, on April 2, 2012, the license was cancelled at the licensee's request.
