= It's a Great Life (TV series) =

American TV comedy series (1954–1956)

- Also known as: The Bachelors
- Genre: Sitcom
- Created by: Dick Chevillat; Ray Singer
- Written by: Dick Chevillat; Leonard Gershe
- Directed by: Christian Nyby
- Starring: Frances Bavier; James Dunn; William Bishop; Michael O'Shea; Barbara Bates
- Theme music composer: David Rose
- Country of origin: United States
- Original language: English
- No. of seasons: 2
- No. of episodes: 78

Production
- Camera setup: Multi-camera
- Running time: 30 minutes
- Production company: Raydic Corporation

Original release
- Network: NBC
- Release: September 7, 1954 – June 3, 1956

It's a Great Life (also known in syndicated reruns as The Bachelors) is an American situation comedy which aired on NBC September 7, 1954 - June 3, 1956.

== Overview ==
Two men who had recently been discharged from military service (Denny and Steve) lodged at the home of Amy Morgan, whose daughter (Kathy) and uncle (Earl) lived with her. Episodes typically dealt with the two men's adapting to new jobs and civilian life and with Earl's attempts to get them involved in schemes to make money. Mr. Russell was a neighbor.

== Cast ==
Frances Bavier, six years before being cast as Aunt Bee (Note: Some sources cite Frances Bavier's The Andy Griffith Show screen name from 1960-1970 as "Beatrice (Bea) Taylor.") in CBS's The Andy Griffith Show, played a somewhat similar role as Mrs. Amy Morgan, the owner of a boarding house. Other characters and the actors who portrayed them were

- Denny Davis - Michael O'Shea
- Steve Connors - William Bishop
- Uncle Earl - James Dunn
- Kathy Morgan - Barbara Bates
- Mr. Russell - Harry Harvey

== Production ==
Dick Chevillat and Ray Singer produced and wrote the program. Christian Nyby was the director, and David Rose was the music director. It was initially broadcast on Tuesdays from 10:30 to 11 p.m. Eastern Time. Beginning on September 18, 1955, it was moved to Sundays from 7 to 7:30 p.m. E. T. The series was filmed in Hollywood.

== Critical response ==
A review in The New York Times described the premiere episode as "a swiftly paced comedy with dialogue like a chain of firecrackers". The review compared the program to movies that featured the Marx brothers with regard to rapid funny remarks that sometimes left the episode's situation far behind. It added that the actors seemed to be enjoying themselves, "playing more for their own amusement than for an audience".
