= Nina Bara =

American actress

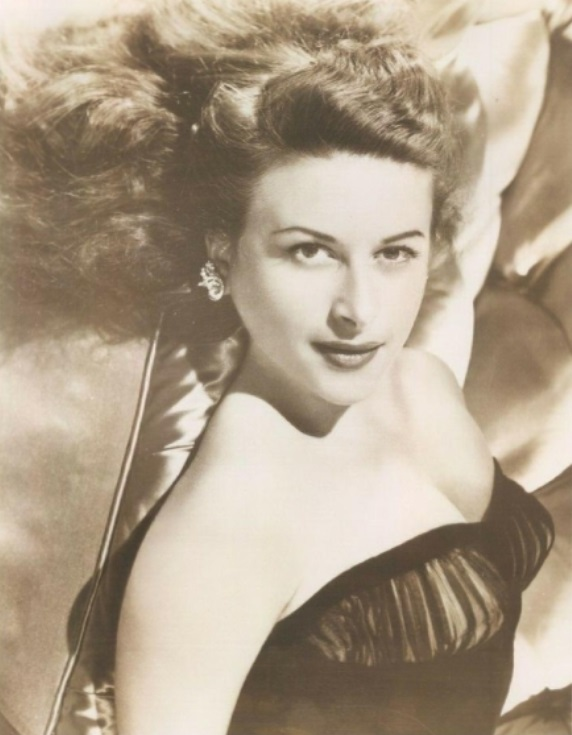
- Born: May 3, 1920; Buenos Aires, Argentina
- Died: August 15, 1990 (aged 70); Glendale, California, United States
- Occupation: Actress

Nina Bara (born Frances Joan Baur on May 3, 1920, died August 15, 1990) was an American actress who performed in films, on television, and on old-time radio. Bara is best known for her role as "Tonga" in the 1950s TV series Space Patrol.

== Early years ==
The daughter of an Italian mother and an American father, George Baur, Bara was born in Buenos Aires. She was educated in Germany, Austria, and Italy.

== Film ==
While acting in The Gay Senorita (1945), Bara helped Brooklyn-born Adele Jergens adopt a Latin accent for her role in that film. Concurrently, Bara worked to lose her own accent to make herself acceptable for a wider range of roles. Her other films included Visa and Carnival in Rio. The former Space Patrol actress also had roles in numerous motion pictures for Columbia, MGM, Universal, 20th Century-Fox and Monogram Studios.

== Radio and television ==
On radio, Bara portrayed Tonga, "...a former alien villain turned Space Patrol ally." in Space Patrol. She also was heard on Tell It Again, Mr. President and The Adventures of Bill Lance. She also appeared on Retribution, and Meet the Missus. She had the same Tonga role on the TV version of Space Patrol, which began as a local program on KECA in Los Angeles and later was carried on ABC. In 1954, after she had left Space Patrol, Bara filed suit for invasion of privacy and breach of contract against the producers of the program and other parties. The suit alleged that kinescopes of the program were released without her consent. It also asked for an injunction to prevent use of her likeness on cereal boxes and toys.

In the mid-1950s, Bara was co-host of Familiar Faces, a game show on KABC-TV in Los Angeles.

In addition to co-starring in Personal Appearance Theater for ABC-TV, Bara was also the featured comedienne with the Allan Young Show in guest spots and participated in several Life with Elizabeth films for Guild Films.

Bara appeared as "Miss EMMY" for the Award Presentation of the Academy of Television Arts & Sciences on February 18, 1952 and also appeared on a number of telethons during the 1950s."

== Personal life ==
On July 10, 1952, Bara married Robert B. Sheldon, an assistant television director. On July 14, 1956, she married Richard Winslow Johnson, a musician. They separated on May 4, 1957, and divorced on April 14, 1958.

== Later years ==
In the early 1960s, Bara made the dean's honor list at Los Angeles City College, where she majored in psychology. After leaving show business in the 1960s, she pursued a second career as a librarian, earning a master's degree in library science at the University of Southern California, and then established a corporate library at Blue Cross of Southern California. After retiring from there in 1985, she worked as a substitute in the city library system.

== Death ==
On August 15, 1990, Bara died of cancer at Glendale Adventist Medical Center. She was 70.
