= Space Patrol (1950 TV series) =

American science-fiction television series

- Title card from the episode "The Energy Thief", original air date September 13, 1950
- Genre: Science fiction; Adventure fiction
- Created by: Mike Moser
- Written by: Mike Moser; Norman Jolley (radio) Lou Huston
- Directed by: Dick Darley
- Starring: Ed Kemmer; Lyn Osborn; Ken Mayer; Virginia Hewitt; Nina Bara; Bela Kovacs
- Narrated by: Jack Narz; George Barclay; Frank Bingham (TV) Dick Tufeld; Dick Wesson (radio)
- Country of origin: United States
- No. of seasons: 5.5
- No. of episodes: 210 (30 min. TV episodes); 900 (15 min. TV episodes); 129 (radio episodes)

Production
- Executive producer: Mike Moser
- Producers: Mike Moser; Dik Darley
- Camera setup: Alex Quiroga; John DeMoss
- Running time: 15–30 minutes (weekly)
- Production companies: Mike Moser Productions, Inc.

Original release
- Network: ABC
- Release: March 9, 1950 – February 26, 1955

Space Patrol is an American science fiction adventure series set in the 30th century that was originally aimed at juvenile audiences via television, radio, and comic books. It was broadcast on ABC from March 1950 to February 1955. It soon developed a sizable adult audience, and by 1954 the program consistently ranked in the top 10 shows broadcast on a Saturday.

== Premise ==
The stories followed the 30th-century adventures of Commander-in-Chief Buzz Corry (Ed Kemmer) of the United Planets Space Patrol and his young sidekick Cadet Happy (Lyn Osborn), as they faced interplanetary villains with diabolical schemes.

The show was targeted to children, but attracted a sizable adult audience. Many episodes featured commercial tie-in merchandise, like toys and mail-order premiums, that were advertised during commercial breaks. Many of the ads for corporate sponsor Ralston Purina's Chex cereals used the show's space opera motif in their pitches. A unique feature of the TV and radio adventures was that the premium of the month was often worked into the story action. This permitted young viewers to feel that they were participating in the radio or televised adventures. Space Patrol's best known premium was a "Name the Planet" contest wherein the winner was awarded the program's Terra IV spaceship. The prize was a giant trailer in the shape of the series' space craft. One of the many "Name the Planet" commercials may be viewed online.

The program sponsored a Space Patrol club, which viewers could join. Continuing merchandise tie-ins perpetuated the connection, producing such a sizable following that many of the nation's magazines chronicled the phenomenon. Many, but not all, of the 30-minute TV episodes are still currently available in various video/ DVD formats.

== Radio series ==
The radio version ran from 4 October 1952 to 19 March 1955, for 129 episodes. The same cast performed on both shows. The writers, scripts, and directors were reused between the radio and TV incarnations, but the radio broadcasts were not limited by studio sets and became more expansive in scope than the television programs. Although there was seldom any deliberate crossing-over of storylines, some of the television villains regularly appeared on the radio (notably Prince Bacarratti), and during the "Planet X" story, both the TV and radio versions explored the rogue planet's invasion of the Space Patrol universe.

While the radio series lacked the sophistication of sci-fi shows like the later X Minus One, it was enjoyed as a throwback to the Golden Age of space opera popularized in the 1930s by pioneering magazine editor Hugo Gernsback. Only 117 of the original broadcasts survive. 97 are on the Old Time Radio website and a few others on torrent sites.

== Cast ==
=== Main ===
- Ed Kemmer as Commander-in-Chief Edward "Buzz" Corry – Corry is the senior officer of the Space Patrol whose assigned task including clearing the space lanes and maintaining peace in the galaxy. As the series continued, his mission expanded to exploring the outer regions of intergalactic space and time.
- Lyn Osborn as Cadet Happy Osborn – Osborn is a graduate of the Space Patrol's Space Academy who is given an initial training assignment as cadet and aide to Commander Corry.
- Virginia Hewitt as Carol Carlisle – Carlisle is the daughter of the Secretary General of the United Planets who works in both an administrative and scientific capacity at the United Planets' Headquarters.
- Ken Mayer as Maj. Robbie Robertson – Robertson is the Security Chief of the Space Patrol and friend and fellow adventurer with Commander Corry.

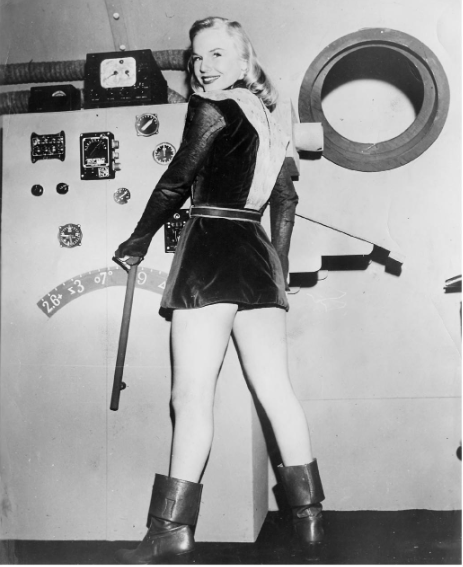
Virginia Hewitt in a publicity photo for the show

- Nina Bara as Tonga – Tonga had been a villain in earlier episodes known as The Lady of Diamonds. She is converted from the "dark side" and became the Chief Assistant to Major Robertson and a valuable ally of the Space Patrol.
- Bela Kovacs as Prince Baccarratti, and other villains and characters appearing in the series – However, it is his portrayal as Bacarratti or the "black falcon" for which he is probably best remembered. He is also Associate Producer for 16 episodes.
- Norman Jolley as Agent X – Agent X is one of the original recurring arch villains in the series. Jolley is also the "chief writer" for the show and served double duty.
- Marvin Miller as Mr. Proteus – Mr. Proteus was a popular recurring villain who could assume many disguises making him extremely difficult to capture.
- Paul Cavanagh as The Secretary General of the United Planets – He is the chief executive for the government of the United Planets. Commander Corry reported directly to him.
- Glen Denning as Commander Kit Corry – the original star, Denning was replaced by Ed Kemmer very early in the series (after about 25 episodes). Kit Corry is Buzz's older brother and original "Commander-in-Chief" of the Space Patrol.

=== Recurring ===
Space Patrol hired many actors who later became well known in their own right. The episodes included such personalities as Ray Bolger, Gene Barry, Bill Baldwin, Lee Van Cleef, I. Stanford Jolley, Robert Shayne, William Schallert, Richard Devon, Carleton Young and Ed Nelson. The following cast members are some of those actors who appeared in multiple episodes:

- Ben Welden as Johnson (9 episodes, 1952–54)
- Joel Smith as Android (8 episodes, 1952–55)
- Tom McKee as Ahyo (7 episodes, 1953–54)
- Lawrence Dobkin as Marco (7 episodes, 1953–55)
- Morgan Shaan as Axel (6 episodes, 1953–54)
- Fred Howard as Andrews (6 episodes, 1951–53)
- Richard Karlan as Captain Dagger (5 episodes, 1953–54)
- Valerie Bales as Yula (4 episodes, 1955)
- Bill Baldwin as Barti (4 episodes, 1951–54)
- Jack Reitzen as Keller (4 episodes, 1951–53)
- Lee Van Cleef as Herrick (4 episodes, 1952–53)
- Charles Horvath as Corporal (4 episodes, 1952–55)
- Bob Carson as Governor Willis (4 episodes, 1952–53)
- Charles Victor as Dr. Jerry Taylor (4 episodes, 1953–55)
- William Justine as Benjamin (4 episodes, 1953–54)
- Robert Shayne as Groata (3 episodes, 1954)
- Joel Marston as Bill Redrow (3 episodes, 1952–54)
- Norbert Schiller as Bit (3 episodes, 1953–55)
- I. Stanford Jolley as Dr. Lambert (3 episodes, 1953–54)
- Oliver Blake as Ezekial Martin (3 episodes, 1954)
- Dorothy Ford as Queen Riva (3 episodes, 1954)
- Henry Corden as Brooks (3 episodes, 1951–53)
- Jack Brown as Josiah (3 episodes, 1954)
- Gail Bonney as Goodwife Martin (3 episodes, 1954)
- Peter Mamakos as Herrick (3 episodes, 1951–52)
- Ward Wood as Farlon (3 episodes, 1951–52)
- John Alderson as Bolen (3 episodes, 1952–53)
- Frederic Berest as Bender (3 episodes, 1952–53)
- Stephen Chase as Sloan (3 episodes, 1952–53)
- Leo V. Matranga as Freddie (3 episodes, 1952)
- William Boyett as Guard (3 episodes, 1953)
- Joe Cranston as Guard (3 episodes, 1953)
- Gabriel Curtiz as Dr. Gruber (3 episodes, 1953)
- Anne Dore as Letha (3 episodes, 1953)
- Frances Farwell as Calva (3 episodes, 1954)
- Hannes Lutz as Doctor Kurt (3 episodes, 1954)
- Gloria Pall as Zamba (3 episodes, 1954)
- Kurt Katch as Arachna (3 episodes, 1955)
- Carleton Young as Gen. Narda (2 episodes, 1954)
- Alvy Moore as Ferris Macklin (2 episodes, 1951–52)
- Lisa Howard as Lisa (2 episodes, 1951)
- Keith Larsen as Bradford (2 episodes, 1952)
- Paul Guilfoyle as Brunner (2 episodes, 1952–53)
- George Pembroke as Carl Marsden (2 episodes, 1952–53)
- Jerry O'Sullivan as Hefler (2 episodes, 1952)
- Bert Holland as The General (2 episodes, 1955)
- John Larch as Korwin (2 episodes, 1953–54)
- Pierce Lyden as Chaney (2 episodes, 1951–55)
- Jerry Sheldon as Bit (2 episodes, 1951–55)
- William E. Green as Pop Stanton (2 episodes, 1951–53)
- Richard Bartlett as Harris (2 episodes, 1951–52)
- Maurice Hill as Capt. Hayward (2 episodes, 1951–52)
- William Schallert as Craig (2 episodes, 1951–52)
- Jean Howell as Nurse (2 episodes, 1952–54)
- Jan Arvan as Kruse (2 episodes, 1952–53)
- Phil Chambers as Forman (2 episodes, 1952–53)
- Thomas Browne Henry as Holliday (2 episodes, 1952–53)
- Bruce Payne as Breckrenridge (2 episodes, 1952–53)
- Dan Seymour as Kovel (2 episodes, 1952–53)
- Roland Varno as Doc (2 episodes, 1952–53)
- George Douglas as Bit (2 episodes, 1953–55)
- Marshall Bradford as Perry (2 episodes, 1953)
- Michael Colgan as Fredericks (2 episodes, 1953)
- Gene Roth as Cole (2 episodes, 1953)
- Ed Nelson as Guard (2 episodes, 1954–55)
- Ed Hinton as Tyler (2 episodes, 1954)
- Jack Lynn as Guard (2 episodes, 1954)
- Lloyd Taylor as Bookstore Clerk (2 episodes, 1954)
- Richard Devon as Molak (4 episodes, 1950)

== Production ==
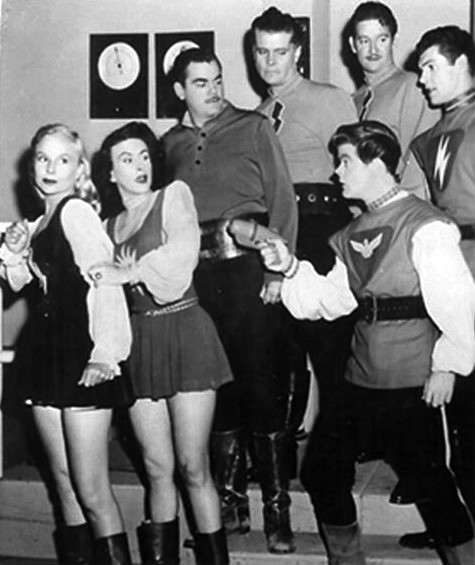
An early 1950 appearance of the Space Patrol cast. After moving to ABC, costumes and sets were rapidly upgraded. From left: Virginia Hewitt - Carol Carlisle, Nina Bara - Tonga, Norman Jolly - Agent X, Glen Dixon - Gruel, Ken Mayer - Major Robertson, Ed Kemmer - Commander Buzz Corry, and Lyn Osborn - Cadet Happy.

Space Patrol was the first West Coast morning network program broadcast to the East Coast, via a massive network of cable and electronic interchanges. The program was televised from the original soundstage where the Lon Chaney motion picture Phantom of the Opera had been filmed. The "Phantom Stage" was one of the largest TV stages in Hollywood, and made a great home for Space Patrol. While other televised science fiction programs such as Captain Video and Tom Corbett, Space Cadet used smaller sound stages, Space Patrol sets grew larger and larger. The studio had catwalks high above the stage that were used for many of the scenes, especially those requiring large castle-like sets. Likewise, cast members could be suspended in "space" outside their spacecraft without the problems of studio cramping.

Space Patrol's creator was William "Mike" Moser, a World War II veteran United States naval aviator. In frequent interviews such as one given to Time magazine in March 1952, Moser stated that he developed the series idea while flying across the Pacific. He was determined to create a children's television program that was as exciting to them as Buck Rogers and Flash Gordon had been to him during his youth. Moser took his idea to KECA-TV, a local Los Angeles ABC station. They bought the concept and Space Patrol began airing in March 1950.

Glen Denning was originally cast in the lead as Commander-in-Chief Kit Corry and comedian Lyn Osborn as the youthful sidekick Cadet Happy. Denning had continual problems remembering lines and delivering them and was replaced after about 25 episodes. War hero Ed Kemmer, a graduate of the Pasadena Playhouse, was his replacement. Denning most likely didn't mind leaving the show, as each cast member was paid only $8 per episode (by 1952, however, the show's budget had increased to $25,000 a week and by 1954 Lyn Osborn's salary alone had increased to around $900 a week.) Osborn, like Kemmer, studied at the Playhouse and had introduced Kemmer to Mike Moser. Kemmer's seriousness and military bearing brought a maturity to the role that helped to increase the popularity of the series.

Both the 30-minute and 15-minute programs were performed and broadcast live. If a line was flubbed or an accident happened, the actors recovered as quickly as possible and soldiered on. The pressure of memorizing lines for a new live 15-minute show every day (Monday through Friday) was onerous enough, but became even more burdensome when the 30-minute weekly Saturday show was added beginning Dec. 30, 1950. Around this time, Moser began sharing the writing chores with Norman Jolley. The actors' tasks were increasingly difficult because they faced the complexity of coordinating their on-camera movements with intricate special effects, which also had to be created live and in real-time. For example, pistols that shot invisible rays necessitated pre-positioning small electrically wired explosive charges on the surface they were supposed to strike. An actor would aim the prop ray gun at that location and squeeze the trigger, whereupon a special effects worker off-scene would throw the detonation switch.

A practical videotape system was not available until after Space Patrol's run, so for distribution to distant stations the image on a small, bright TV monitor was filmed using a motion picture camera with a specially modified and synchronized shutter mechanism, creating kinescope recordings on 16 mm or 35 mm film. Most of the Saturday half-hour TV broadcasts survived in this form and so are still available today. The 15-minute weekday version of the program was at first seen mainly in the Los Angeles broadcast area, but was later also seen nationwide by syndication via kinescope films.

When Mike Moser was killed in a car accident in 1954, his wife Helen became executive producer and Bela Kovacs was appointed associate producer. Moser's plans for another, more adult-oriented sci-fi series called Report to Earth never came to fruition as the result of his sudden death. After the Russians launched Sputnik, Space Patrol was hurriedly syndicated under the title Satellite Police, with new titles and credits spliced onto the kinescopes.

== Broadcast ==
The Space Patrol television show began broadcasting March 9, 1950, as a Monday-through-Friday 15-minute show on the American Broadcasting Company (ABC) owned-and-operated Los Angeles station, KECA (now KABC-TV). On December 30, 1950, ABC added a half-hour version of the program to its Saturday schedule. It became an overnight sensation, and the new weekly show and the 15-minute shows continued concurrently on a local basis. It was seen via kinescope syndication in other cities. A 1953 30-minute episode was the subject of the first U.S. experimental 3D television broadcast on April 29 in Los Angeles on KECA (since renamed KECA-TV).

The series made history by being the first regular live West Coast morning network program beamed to the East Coast. At the time, it took an intricate network of cable and relay stations to accomplish this task.

The ABC television Space Patrol broadcasts became one of the nation's first mass media phenomena, and an ABC radio companion series was developed. The radio program was also popular and ran from September 18, 1950 until March 19, 1955 producing 129 thirty-minute episodes.

The televised Space Patrol aired continuously until July 2, 1954; after a short break, it reappeared on September 4, 1954, before finally disappearing from the air on February 26, 1955. 210 half-hour shows and close to 900 15-minute shows were made over Space Patrol's 5-year run. The sponsors included Purina/Ralston and Nestles.

Despite the American series being nearly a decade old, when a similarly themed UK children's puppet series also titled Space Patrol was syndicated to America in the early 1960s, it had to be retitled Planet Patrol so as to avoid confusion.

== In other media ==
=== Records ===
There were at least two records available in the early 1950s, featuring "prequel" situations involving Commander Corry and Cadet Happy, and starring the radio/TV cast, although the 'origin' story for Cadet Happy contradicted both the 15-minute and 30-minute TV show versions.

Columbia Gramaphone (Aust) Pty. Ltd released a 78 record in the 1950s KO1015, Space Patrol Adventures No.1 of a series, "Cadet Happy Joins Commander Corry". Happy wins the Corry Scholarship and is then practically adopted by Commander Corry to train as his aide on the side of right and justice. It is based in the 31st century. Buzz Corry is played by Ed Kemmer, Cadet Happy by Lyn Osborn, Gaff Carter by Roy Engel, and Carol Carlyle by Virginia Hewitt; the narrator is Dick Tufeld, and the Control Tower voice is Norman Jolley.

=== Books, comic books, and other publications ===
A comic book tie-in, Space Patrol, published by Ziff-Davis in 1952, ran two issues. It featured cover paintings by Norman Saunders and Clarence Doore. Bernard Krigstein illustrated the scripts by Phil Evans. The comics retail for about $1,000 each today in high grade condition.

Unlike Tom Corbett, Space Cadet, Space Patrol was never featured in a daily or Sunday newspaper comic strip, nor was there a series of juvenile novels recounting Space Patrol adventures.

Jean-Noel Bassior authored an extensive book in 2005 titled Space Patrol: Missions of Daring in the Name of Early Television. The book from McFarland & Company, Inc., Publishers was well received and created new interest in the television and radio show.

There was a three-issue Space Patrol comic book series in the early 1990s which purported to be of the TV series, but whose writer and artist admitted they had never seen the show. This adaptation suffered greatly because of this.

== Legacy ==
Actor Ed Kemmer attended many of the important film festivals during the late 90s and early 2000s and discovered a renewed Space Patrol popularity that continued up until the time of his death in 2004. The emergence of electronic media during the 1990s permitted a greater interchange of Space Patrol merchandise that heretofore had been closely held by collectors. This stimulated new interest and, in turn, production of new publications and merchandise for Space Patrol fans. A rather extensive book written by Jean Noel Bassior furthered interest in the series, as did the production of a new set of Space Patrol trading cards, replicas of the program's space craft, clocks, jackets and other period paraphernalia.

The original space ship prop control panel sold at auction in 2014 for $23,000.

== See also ==
- Captain Video and His Video Rangers
- Rocky Jones, Space Ranger
- Tom Corbett, Space Cadet

== Further listening ==
- OTR Network Library: Space Patrol (97 episodes)
