= The Zane Grey Show =

American radio Western drama (1947–1948)

The Zane Grey Show is an American Western radio drama that was broadcast September 23, 1947 – February 24, 1948, on the Mutual Broadcasting System

== Overview ==
The Zane Grey Show was a part of an emphasis on adventure programs at the Mutual Broadcasting System (MBS), the third major radio network in the United States during the 1930s and 1940s. Mutual competed on radio until the late 1990s, with the other "Big Three" American media networks: NBC, established in 1926; CBS, founded in 1927; and ABC, launched in 1943.

Grey's works until then had "received comparatively little attention from a script-hungry radio industry" and the series "could be the forerunner of a cycle of Western fare for adult listeners" noted The New York Times. The main character of the show was "Tex Thorne", a Pony Express rider in the year before the American Civil War. The drama series drew from the published and unpublished works of Western author Zane Grey. The radio series was set in Purple Sage, an American frontier town near the Rocky Mountains of the Western United States.

Western film and television actor Vic Perrin initially portrayed "Tex Thorne", but Jim Bannon took over that role in the series's second episode. Network executives at Mutual Broadcasting System said that they thought Perrin "sounded more like a villain than a hero". Don MacLaughlin portrayed and gave a different voice to the Pony Express carrier character "Tex Thorne" when the series originated from New York City studios. Radio voice and announcer Bill Forman was the narrator for the Zane Grey program on Mutual.

=== Episodes ===
The September 30, 1947, episode had Thorne failing to resolve conflict between a cattle rancher and the man who wanted to marry his daughter. Thorne eventually apprehended the man, who had wounded the rancher and killed the United States Marshal who tried to arrest him. Thorne insisted that the man had mental problems, which led to a life sentence in a prison hospital.

Four months later in the January 6, 1948, episode, Thorne rescued the husband of a rich sheep rancher from an erroneous murder conviction during the times of range wars in the Old West.

The February 17, 1948, episode dealt with the social and cultural problems that arose when a Native American young man fell in love with a white girl after he left his reservation and became a famous athlete in college.

== Production ==
Stephen Slesinger was the producer. Directors included Paul Franklin and Emmett Paul. Franklin also wrote for the series. Harry Zimmerman led the orchestra. The series initially originated from Hollywood. It was moved to New York beginning with the October 21, 1947, episode. The half-hour program was broadcast on Tuesdays at 9:30 pm. Eastern Time. Priced at $2,500, the show was sustaining. Hawley Publications, which published the monthly Zane Grey Magazine, underwrote some of the program's expenses.

The trade publication Variety reported that The Zane Grey Show ended because it never met expectations of network executives and because of "disputes over control and the question of where the show should originate". Its competition included The Fred Waring Show on NBC. It was replaced by The Casebook of Gregory Hood.

== Critical response ==
A review of the premiere episode in Variety said that The Zane Grey Show "reduces the late Zane Grey's popular Westerns to practically Lone Ranger fare" and added that it followed a formula typical of Westerns. The review called the acting "undistinguished ... without major flaws" and said that the directing and writing were "capable".

The trade publication Billboard said in a review of the same episode, "Action was frequent and violent", with sound effects such that "for minutes at a time it was difficult to tell who was doing what to whom". The review added that Perrin's portrayal "made Tex sound properly infantile, dashing, and romantic."

Media critic John Crosby commented on the use of clichés in the program, writing, "the dialogue employed on this show is even more historic than the plots". He also noted, "There's a good deal of shooting but no one – not even the rustlers – gets hurt much."
