= Lyn Osborn =

American actor (1926–1958)

- Lyn Osborne in Invasion of the Saucer Men.
- Born: Clois Lyn Osborn; January 21, 1926; Wichita Falls, Texas, U.S.
- Died: August 30, 1958 (aged 32); Los Angeles, California, U.S.
- Occupation: Actor
- Years active: 1950–1958
- Known for: Space Patrol

Lyn Osborn (January 21, 1926 – August 30, 1958) was an American actor, born Clois Lyn Osborn in Wichita Falls, Texas. He is best remembered as "Cadet Happy" on Space Patrol, and from his role in Invasion of the Saucer Men. He died following brain surgery at age 32.

== Early life ==
Clois Lyn Osborn was born January 21, 1926, in Wichita Falls, Texas. At age 3, his family moved to Michigan, living in Muskegon and Lincoln Park. At age 10, his mother enrolled him and his sister in a community theater group, which started his interest in performing. He played clarinet, flute and piccolo in the high school band. In 1943 after graduating from Lincoln Park High School, where he was known by the family nickname "Buddy", Lyn joined the navy. He served as an aerial gunner and radar operator, and flew on Grumman Avengers. The war ended before he went into combat.

== Space Patrol ==
After the navy, Lyn held several jobs before hitchhiking to California, where he did more of the same. He enrolled at the Pasadena Playhouse on the G.I. Bill for 3 years, and appeared in 15 plays there. Ten days before graduation, he got his big break cast as "Cadet Happy" on Space Patrol. The series began as a daily live 15 minute show broadcast from Los Angeles. Soon, half-hour weekly shows were added. There was also a live radio version that ran from 1952 to 1955. The television series ran until 1955, after nearly 1,200 episodes were produced.

== Later roles and death ==
After Space Patrol, he appeared in several TV and film projects, such as The Amazing Colossal Man, The Adventures of Jim Bowie and Rod Serling's acclaimed Requiem for a Heavyweight episode of Playhouse 90. On December 21, 1954, Lyn appeared as himself and in character as Space Patrol's Cadet Happy on the daytime talk show, "The Betty White Show". His most memorable appearance was in 1957's Invasion of the Saucer Men, playing the role of Artie, also the narrator of the film.

He died following an operation for a brain tumor at UCLA Medical Center, August 30, 1958 at the age of 32. Lyn is interred at Forest Lawn Cemetery in Glendale, California.

== Filmography ==
- 1962 Paradise Alley (Filmed in 1958) – Neighborhood Man
- 1959 Arson for Hire – Jim, the Fireman
- 1959 The Cosmic Man – Sgt. Gray
- 1958 The Ann Sothern Show (TV series) – A New Lease on Life (1958) ... Jimmy
- 1958 Torpedo Run – Hannigan – Sub Crewman (uncredited)
- 1958 The Life of Riley (TV series) – Annie's Radio Romance (1958) ...Page
- 1958 Too Much, Too Soon – Telegram Delivery Man (uncredited)
- 1957–1958 The Adventures of Jim Bowie (TV series) – A Grave for Jim Bowie (1958) ... Wiley 'Little' Hart – Epitaph for an Indian (1957) ... Epp Waite
- 1958 Leave It to Beaver (TV series) – The Paper Route (1958) ... Newspaper Customer #2
- 1958 Men of Annapolis (TV series) – Last Chance (1958) ... Red
- 1957 The Amazing Colossal Man Sgt. Taylor
- 1957 The Silent Service (TV series) – The Perch's New Role (1957) ... Joe Cox
- 1957 Telephone Time (TV series) – Here Lies Francois Gold (1957)
- 1957 Invasion of the Saucer Men – Artie Burns
- 1957 Top Secret Affair – Stumpy (uncredited)
- 1956 Playhouse 90 (TV series)- The Big Slide (1956) ... Undetermined Role. – Requiem for a Heavyweight (1956) – Photographer
- 1951 Up Front -Moore (uncredited)
- 1950–1955 Space Patrol – Cadet Happy (1,110 episodes)
