= Phil Harris =

American actor and musician (1904–1995)

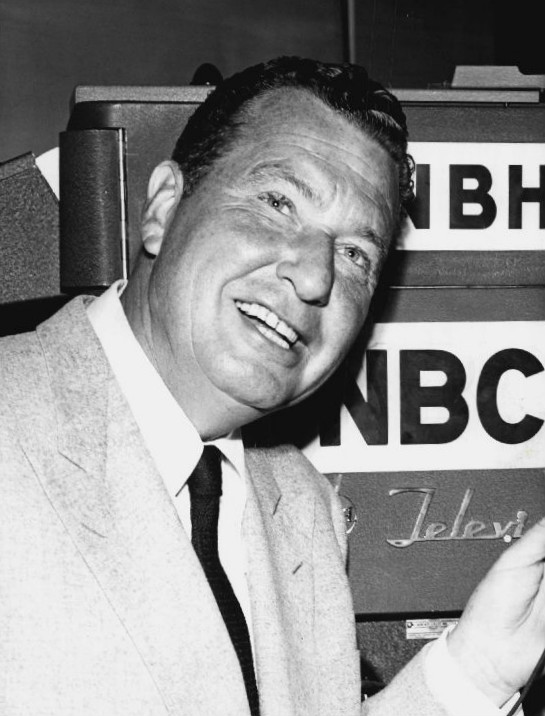
- Harris in 1956
- Born: Wonga Philip Harris; June 24, 1904; Linton, Indiana, U.S.
- Died: August 11, 1995 (aged 91); Rancho Mirage, California, U.S.
- Burial place: Forest Lawn Cemetery, Cathedral City, California, U.S.
- Other names: Old Curly; Curly
- Occupations: Actor; bandleader; comedian; musician
- Years active: 1927–1991
- Spouses: Marcia Ralston (m. 1927; div. 1940) Alice Faye (m. 1941)
- Children: 3

Wonga Philip Harris (June 24, 1904 – August 11, 1995) was an American actor, comedian, bandleader and musician. He was an orchestra leader and a pioneer in radio situation comedy, first with The Jack Benny Program, then in The Phil Harris-Alice Faye Show in which he co-starred with his wife, singer-actress Alice Faye, for eight years. Harris is also noted for his voice acting in animated films. As a voice actor, he voiced Baloo in The Jungle Book (1967), Thomas O'Malley in The Aristocats (1970), Little John in Robin Hood (1973) and Patou in Rock-a-Doodle (1991). As a singer, he recorded a number one novelty hit record, "The Thing" (1950).

== Early life and career ==
Harris was born in Linton, Indiana, on June 24, 1904 and grew up in Nashville. He identified as a Southerner. His hallmark song was "That's What I Like About the South". He had a trace of a Southern accent and in later years made self-deprecating jokes over the air about his heritage. His parents were circus performers. His father, a tent bandleader, gave him his first job as a drummer with the circus band.

Harris' unusual first name, "Wonga", is said to derive from a Cherokee word meaning "messenger of fleet" or, perhaps more accurately translated, "fast messenger". He began his music career as a drummer in San Francisco, in the mid-1920s playing drums in the Henry Halstead Big Band Orchestra. He formed an orchestra with Carol Lofner in the latter 1920s beginning a long engagement at the St. Francis Hotel in San Francisco. (Note: Billed as "Carol Laughner and his Palm Court Orchestra", they played in Melbourne, Australia from November 1926 to October 1927.) In the 1930s, Lofner and Harris recorded swing music for Victor Records, Columbia Records, Decca Records, and Vocalion Records. The partnership ended by 1932, and Harris led a band in Los Angeles for which he was the singer and bandleader.

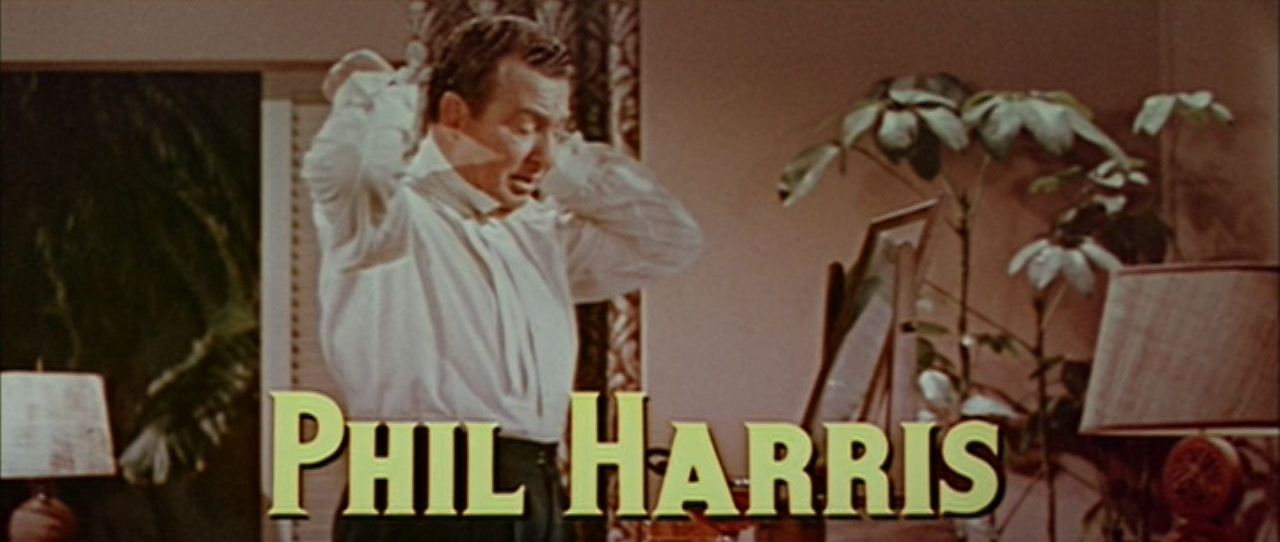
Harris in The High and the Mighty

In 1933, he made a short film for RKO called So This Is Harris!, which won an Academy Award for best live action short subject. He followed with a feature-length film, Melody Cruise. Both films were created by the same team that produced Flying Down to Rio, which started the careers of Fred Astaire and Ginger Rogers. He also starred in I Love a Bandleader (1945) with Leslie Brooks. He played a house painter who gets amnesia and then leads a band. He recorded Woodman, Spare That Tree (by George Pope Morris and Henry Russell) in 1947. His nickname was "Old Curly".

In 1950, Harris recorded a hit novelty song, the million-seller, "The Thing", which hit number one on the U.S. chart. Additionally, he appeared in The Wild Blue Yonder (1951), alongside Forrest Tucker and Walter Brennan. He made a cameo appearance in the Warner Bros. musical, Starlift, with Janice Rule and Dick Wesson, and was featured in The High and the Mighty with John Wayne in 1954. Harris made two feature films with Jack Benny for Paramount Pictures, Man About Town (1939) and Buck Benny Rides Again (1940). Both films also featured Eddie "Rochester" Anderson.

External audio
- Best of Jack Benny Spotlight Podcast! October 4, 1936 – Phil Harris's First Show
- The Fitch Bandwagon/The Phil Harris-Alice Faye Show, 102 episodes

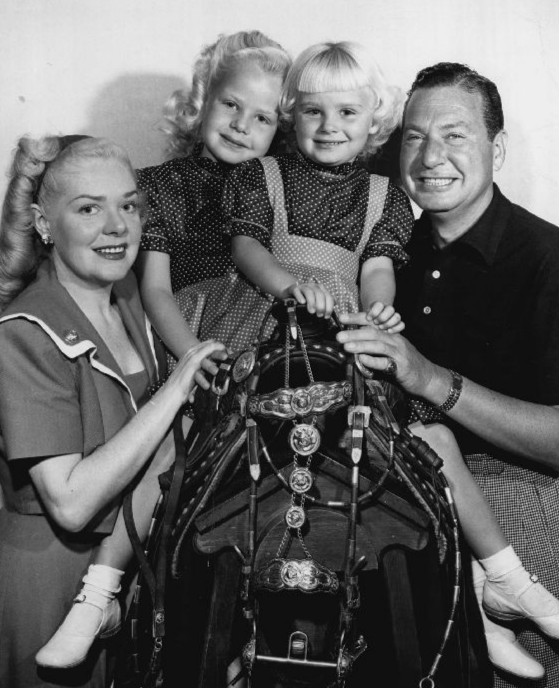
Harris, Faye, and their two daughters, Alice and Phyllis, in 1948

== Radio ==
In 1936, Harris became musical director of The Jell-O Program Starring Jack Benny singing and leading his band and portraying himself as a hip, hard-drinking Southerner whose good nature superseded his ego. He addressed Benny as "Jackson".

In 1942, Harris and his band joined the U.S. Merchant Marine and served for 16 weeks. In 1946, he and his wife Alice Faye began co-hosting The Fitch Bandwagon, a comedy-variety program which followed the Jack Benny show on Sunday nights. On The Fitch Bandwagon and its later incarnation as The Phil Harris-Alice Faye Show, Harris played a vain, stumbling husband, while Faye played his sarcastic but loving wife. Gerald Nachman has written that Harris was a soft-spoken, modest man off the air. In On the Air: The Encyclopedia of Old-Time Radio John Dunning wrote that Harris's character made the show popular. The Phil Harris-Alice Faye Show appeared until 1954. Harris continued to appear on Jack Benny's show from 1948 to 1952.

== Recording career ==
Harris was recording songs as early as 1931. He sang with a deep baritone voice. Songs by Harris include the early 1950s novelty song, "The Thing". The song describes the hapless finder of a box with a mysterious secret and his efforts to rid himself of it.

== Film and Disney work ==
In 1956, Harris appeared in the film Good-bye, My Lady. He made numerous guest appearances on 1960s and 1970s television series, including: The Steve Allen Show, the Kraft Music Hall, Burke's Law, F Troop, The Dean Martin Show, The Hollywood Palace, and other musical variety programs. He appeared on The American Sportsman which took celebrities on hunting and fishing trips around the world.

Harris worked as a voice actor for a number of Disney animated films, providing the voice of: Baloo the bear in The Jungle Book (1967), Thomas O'Malley in The Aristocats (1970) and Little John in Robin Hood (1973). In 1989, Harris was considered to reprise his role as Baloo in the animated series TaleSpin, but he was eventually replaced with Ed Gilbert. Harris's final film role was in Rock-a-Doodle (1991), where he voiced Patou, the Basset Hound.

Harris spent time in the 1970s and early 1980s leading a band that appeared often in Las Vegas, often on the same bill with bandleader Harry James.

== Personal life ==
On September 2, 1927, Harris married actress Marcia Ralston (then known as Mascotte Ralston) in Melbourne, Australia, where his band had a long engagement. The couple adopted a son. Harris and Ralston divorced in September 1940.

Harris and Alice Faye married in 1941; it was a second marriage for both (Faye had been married briefly to singer-actor Tony Martin) and lasted 54 years, until Harris's death.

Harris was a lifelong friend of singer and actor Bing Crosby. He appeared on telecasts of Bing's Pro-Am Golf Tournament from Pebble Beach, California, and appeared in an episode of ABC's short-lived sitcom The Bing Crosby Show. After Crosby died in 1977, Harris replaced him as commentator for the annual Bing Crosby Pro-Am Golf Tournament.

Harris was a resident of Palm Springs, California.

== Death and legacy ==
Harris died of a heart attack at age 91 in his Rancho Mirage home, on the night of August 11, 1995. He is interred at Forest Lawn Cemetery, Cathedral City, California.

Harris was a benefactor of his birthplace of Linton, Indiana, establishing scholarships in his honor for promising high school students, performing at the high school, and hosting a celebrity golf tournament in his honor every year. Harris and Faye donated most of their show business memorabilia and papers to Linton's public library. Harris was inducted into the Indiana Broadcasters Hall of Fame.

In 1994, a Golden Palm Star on the Palm Springs Walk of Stars was dedicated to him.

== Filmography ==
=== Film ===
Year	Title	Role	Notes
1929	Why Be Good	Drummer in band at The Boiler	Uncredited
1933	Melody Cruise	Alan Chandler	
1933	So This Is Harris!	Himself	Short
1936	Double or Nothing	Himself	Short
1937	Turn Off the Moon	Himself	
1937	Harris in the Spring	Himself	
1939	Man About Town	Ted Nash	
1940	Buck Benny Rides Again	Himself	
1940	Dreaming Out Loud	Peter Atkinson	
1945	I Love a Bandleader	Phil Burton	
1950	Wabash Avenue	Mike Stanley	
1951	Here Comes the Groom	Himself	Uncredited
1951	The Wild Blue Yonder	Sgt. Hank Stack	
1951	Starlift	Himself	
1954	The High and the Mighty	Ed Joseph	
1956	Anything Goes	Steve Blair	
1956	Good-bye, My Lady	A.H. "Cash" Evans	
1956	Saturday Spectacular: Manhattan Tower	Billy	Television film
1960	The Big Sell	Salesman	
1963	The Wheeler Dealers	Ray Jay Fox	
1964	The Patsy	Chic Wymore	
1967	The Cool Ones	MacElwaine	
1967	The Jungle Book	Baloo (voice)	
1970	The Aristocats	Thomas O'Malley (voice)	
1971	Tom Jones: Movin' Up the River	Himself	
1971	The Gatling Gun	Luke Boland	
1973	Robin Hood	Little John (voice)	Voice
1991	Rock-a-Doodle	Patou (voice)	Final film role

=== Television ===
Year	Title	Role	Notes
1957	This Is Your Life	Himself	
1964	Ben Casey	Clarence Simmons	Episode: "The Only Place Where They Know My Name"
1966	The Milton Berle Show	Himself	Episode #1.7
1966-1970	The Dean Martin Show	Himself	8 episodes
1967	F Troop	Flaming Arrow	Episode: "What are you doing after the massacre"
1968	The Lucy Show	Phil Stanley	Episode: "Lucy and Phil Harris"
1969	The Johnny Cash Show	Himself	Episode #1.15
1970	This Is Tom Jones	Himself	Episode #2.19
1974	Here's Lucy	Himself	Episode #6.21: Lucy and Phill Harris Strike up the Band
1975	Dinah!	Himself	Episode #2.43
1978	Fantasy Island	Will Fields	Episode: "Carnival/The Vaudevillians"
1978	NBC Salutes the 25th Anniversary of the Wonderful World of Disney	Himself	Documentary
1980	The Love Boat	Harvey Cronkle	Episode: "Y' Gotta Have Heart"
1982	Hee Haw	Himself	Episode #14.10
1984	This Is Your Life	Himself	
1985	The Disney Family Album	Himself	Episode: "Voice Actors"
1989	TaleSpin	Baloo (Unaired; Original Dub Only)	4 Episodes (“I Only Have Ice For You”, “Time Waits For No Bear”, “A Touch Of Glass”, “A Bad Reflection On You” (Part 1))

== Radio appearances ==
Year	Program	Episode/source
1951	Suspense	Death on My Hands

== Partial discography ==
- "That's What I Like About The South" (RCA Victor 20-2089, 1946)
- "Loaded Pistols, Loaded Dice" (RCA Victor 20-2575, 1947)
- "Is It True What They Say About Dixie" (RCA Victor 20-3524, 1949)
- "The Thing" (RCA Victor 20-3968, 1950)
- "Hambone" (RCA Victor 20-4584, 1952)
- You're Blasé (RCA Victor LPM-3203 [10" LP], 1954)
- The South Shall Rise Again (RCA Victor LSP-1985, 1959)
- Harris starred as Baloo in the 1967 animated film The Jungle Book and sang the song "The Bare Necessities". He also performed with Louis Prima on the song "I Wan'na Be Like You (The Monkey Song)".

== Bibliography ==
- Steen, Ivan D. (2001). "Harris, (Wanga) Phillip ("Phil")". The Scribner Encyclopedia of American Lives. Charles Scribner's Sons – via HighBeam Research. ;
