= The Joan Davis Show =

American radio program

- Other names: The Sealtest Village Store (1943-1945); Joanie's Tea Room (1945-1947); Joan Davis Time (1947-1948); Leave It to Joan (1949)
- Genre: Comedy
- Running time: 30 minutes
- Country of origin: United States
- Language: English
- Syndicates: NBC; CBS
- Starring: Joan Davis
- Original release: July 8, 1943 – August 22, 1949
- Sponsored by: Sealtest milk Swan Soap; Roytan cigars

The Joan Davis Show is a title applied — in some cases specifically and in other cases generically — to several old-time radio comedy programs in the United States, some of which had other distinct titles as indicated below. Comedian Joan Davis starred in the programs, all but one version of which were broadcast on CBS.

== The Sealtest Village Store (1943–1945) ==
Singer Rudy Vallée's joining the U.S. Coast Guard during World War II left Sealtest Dairy with no star for The Rudy Vallee Show, which it sponsored. Therefore, the program was revamped and renamed The Sealtest Village Store. Davis was promoted from cast member to star in the new program, which debuted on July 8, 1943, on NBC. Her character was the proprietor of the title store, a woman who "chased men and pined for a steady beau".

Jack Haley joined the cast as the male lead in the role of Davis' helper in the story, apparently because NBC officials were dubious that a female star could be successful as the sole lead in a program. David C. Tucker, in his biography of Davis, described the program as "a ratings winner for NBC from 1943 through 1945". The musical void left by Vallée's departure was filled by singer David Street.

Davis emerged as a strong presence behind the scenes as well as on the air. Her disagreements with producer Tom McAvity over what was best for the show eventually led to McAvity's leaving the program, to be replaced by Robert Redd.

As the end of Davis' contract with the sponsor approached, her agents contacted other potential sponsors, which did not sit well with officials at Sealtest. As a result, they went against a radio custom and did not allow her to say goodbye to listeners of her final Village Store program on June 28, 1945. Davis rebutted the sponsor's charge of disloyalty by reminding the company executives via a "scorching reply" that a year earlier she had stayed with Sealtest rather than accept a significantly higher salary from the American Tobacco Company.

The program's supporting cast included Sharon Douglas, Shirley Mitchell, and Verna Felton. The Fountainaires Quartet and Eddie Paul and his orchestra provided music. Robert L. Redd was the director, with Ray Singer and Dick Chevillat as writers.

== The Joan Davis Show or Joanie's Tea Room (1945–1947) ==
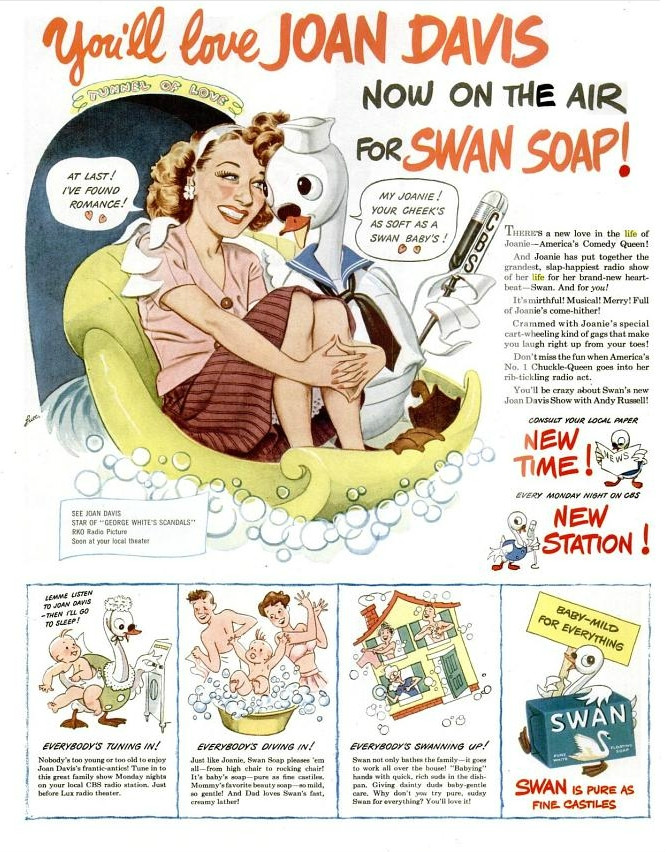
Swan Soap advertisement for Joan Davis' radio program

After leaving The Sealtest Village Store, Davis began her new program on September 3, 1945, on CBS. Sponsored by Swan Soap, the show replaced The George Burns and Gracie Allen Show. The premise had Davis as proprietor of Joanie's Tea Room, which resulted in use of that expression as an alternate title. Its final broadcast was on June 23, 1947.

Like her character on the previous show, in this program Davis sought romance, especially with the program's singer, Andy Russell. That pursuit brought her in conflict with Barbara Weatherby, daughter of the town's banker. Meanwhile, Davis spurned the attentions of announcer Harry von Zell. A noticeable change from the Sealtest show was that this program had few guest stars, relying primarily on situation comedy.

Others heard on the program, in addition to Davis, Russell, and von Zell, were Verna Felton as Rosella Hipperton III and Cousin Corneila, Shirley Mitchell and Sharon Douglas as Barbara Weatherby, Si Wills as Serenus, Wally Brown as himself, and Ben Gage as Dr. Ronald Crenshaw. Bob LeMond was an announcer. Paul Weston and Jack Meakin and their orchestras provided music in the first and second seasons, respectively. Dave Titus and Dick Mack produced and directed. Writers included Harry Crane, Larry Gelbart, Jack Harvey, Nat Linden, Herbert Little, Bob O'Brien, Joe Quillan, Jay Sommers, Si Wills, and David Victor.

== Joan Davis Time (1947–1948) ==
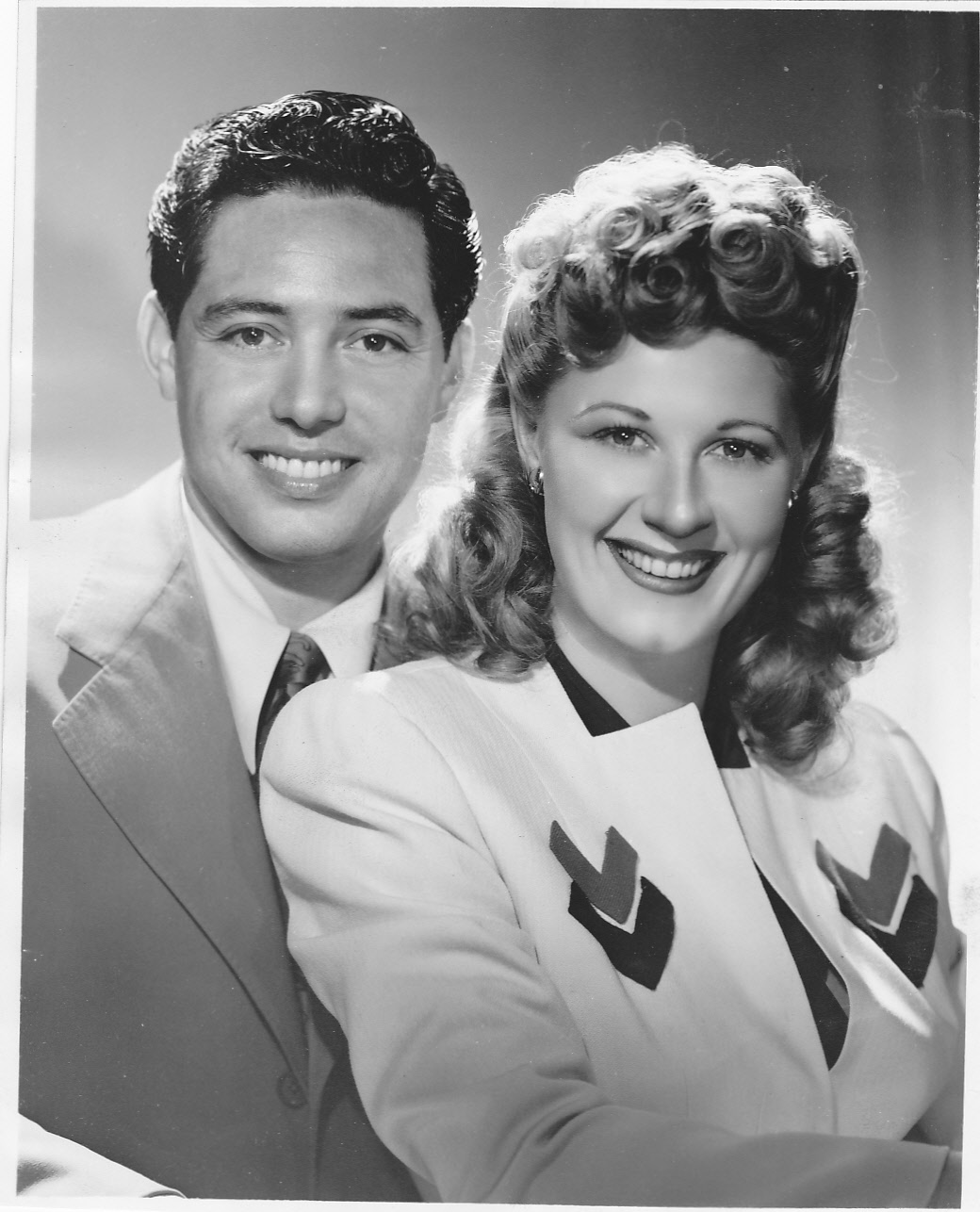
Andy Russell and Joan Davis

After Swan Soap ended its contract with Davis midway through the original four-year span, Joan Davis Time debuted on October 11, 1947, as a revised version of Joanie's Tea Room, with Davis still owner of the tea shop. The program focused on "Joan's efforts to improve her life and find a steady boyfriend"—a premise that was reinforced by the show's theme song, "Nobody's Sweetheart". Humorous incidents arose from Davis' interactions with the tea shop's regular customers as well as with other people she met.

Other than Davis, the main characters were her friend Mabel, played by Sharon Douglas, and tea shop manager Lionel, played by Lionel Stander. Other regulars were Hans Conried, Verna Felton, and Andy Russell. The Choraleers provided vocal music, while Lud Gluskin, John Rarig, and Paul Weston led their orchestras. Announcers were Ben Gage, Bob LeMond, and Harry von Zell. The producer was Dick Mack.

The program ended on July 3, 1948.

== Leave It to Joan (1949) ==
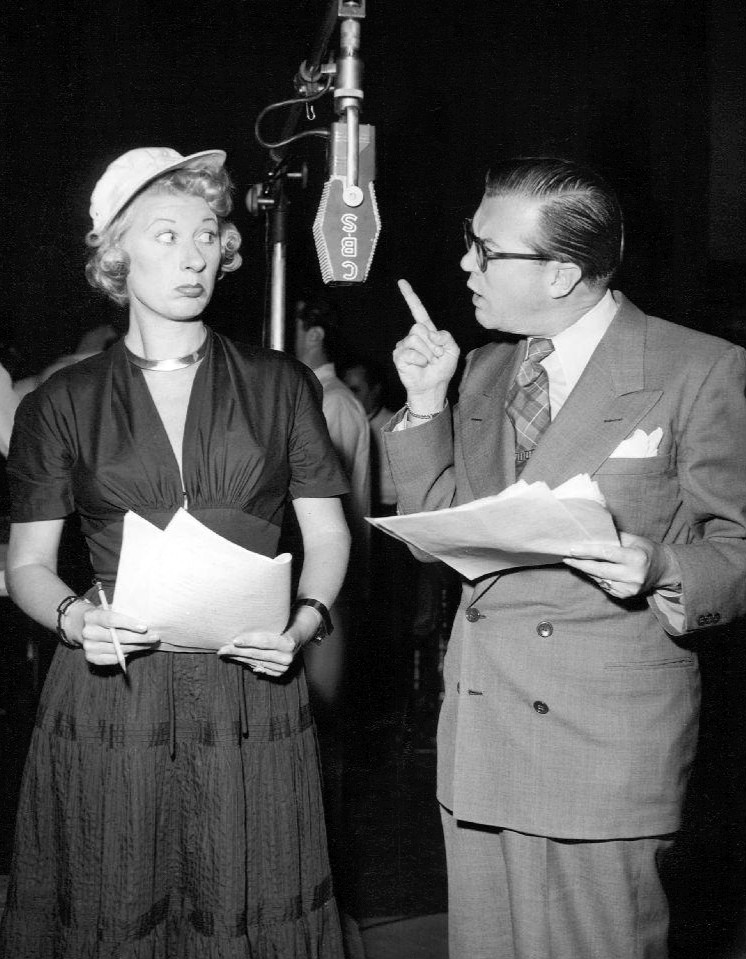
Joan Davis and Joseph Kearns from the radio program Leave it to Joan

Leave It to Joan debuted on CBS on July 4, 1949, as a summer replacement for the first half hour of Lux Radio Theatre and ran until August 22, 1949. Davis portrayed a sales clerk in a department store who lived with her father. Most of the plots evolved from her interactions with the store's staff, and each episode featured a guest star.

=== Cast ===
Characters and the actors who portrayed them were as follows:

- Penny Prentiss - Shirley Mitchell
- Tom Hinkle - Andy Russell, Shepard Menken
- Simon Hackaday - Harry von Zell, Willard Waterman
- Davis's father - Joseph Kearns

Ken Niles was the announcer, and Lyn Murray led the orchestra.

=== Production ===
After March 3, 1950, American Tobacco Company sponsored the program for $8,500 per week, with 21 weeks on the air guaranteed. Commercials promoted Roi-Tan cigars. Complementing the on-air advertising, the company placed images of Davis as a cigar store Indian, "brandishing a tomahawk, moccasins, and a feathered headdress" on cigar boxes and on displays in stores. American ended its sponsorship in March 1950. CBS wanted to keep it on a sustaining basis, but Davis declined. The show returned in July and August 1950 as a summer replacement for My Friend Irma.

Leave It to Joan was the basis for an unsuccessful television pilot, Let's Join Joanie, which was broadcast on January 12, 1951, on CBS. The TV version had Davis in the role of a sales clerk in a hat store.

=== Critical response ===
A review of the July 4, 1949, episode in the trade publication Billboard said the situations in the episode "are just plain contrived and tired". The review added that Davis's "talents merit a better break than she's getting."
