= Man About Town (1939 film) =

1939 film by Mark Sandrich

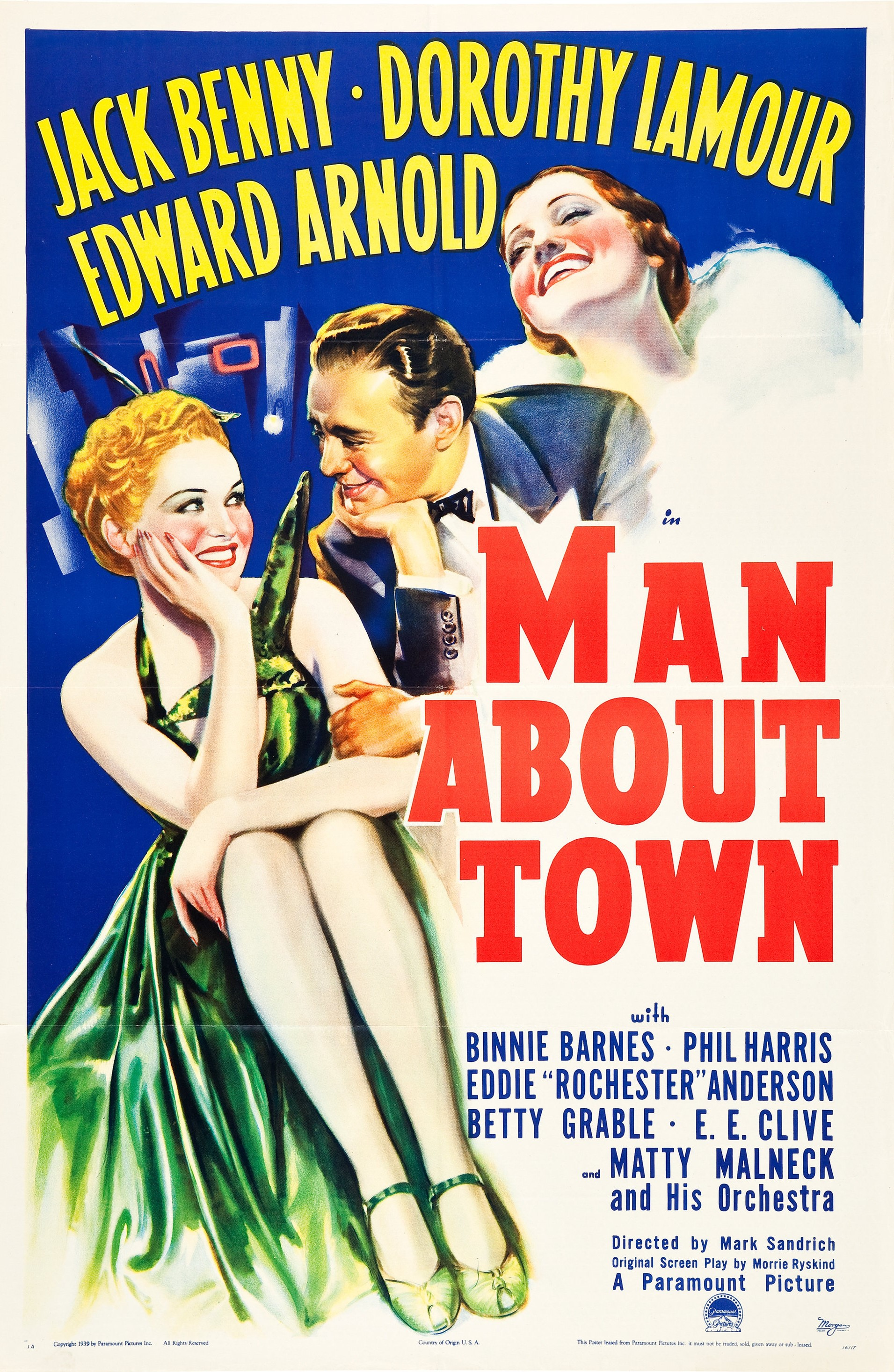
- Film poster
- Directed by: Mark Sandrich
- Written by: Zion Myers (story); Allan Scott (story); Morrie Ryskind (story and screenplay)
- Produced by: Arthur Hornblow Jr.
- Starring: Jack Benny; Dorothy Lamour; Edward Arnold
- Cinematography: Ted Tetzlaff
- Edited by: LeRoy Stone
- Production company: Paramount Pictures
- Distributed by: Paramount Pictures
- Release date: July 7, 1939
- Running time: 85 minutes
- Country: United States
- Language: English

Man About Town is a 1939 musical comedy film starring Jack Benny, Dorothy Lamour, and Edward Arnold.

== Plot ==
A producer tries to get his leading lady to take him seriously romantically by pursuing other women.

== Cast ==
- Jack Benny as Bob Temple
- Dorothy Lamour as Diana Wilson
- Edward Arnold as Sir John Arlington
- Binnie Barnes as Lady Arlington
- Monty Woolley as Henri Dubois
- Isabel Jeans as Mme. Dubois
- Phil Harris as Ted Nash
- Betty Grable as Susan Hayes
- E. E. Clive as Hotchkiss
- Eddie Anderson as Rochester
- The Merriel Abbott Dancers as Themselves
- Matty Malneck and His Orchestra as Themselves
- The Pina Troupe as Themselves
- Charles Coleman as Hotel doorman (uncredited)
- Cecil Kellaway as Headwaiter (uncredited)
- Cliff Severn as English bellboy (uncredited)

== Premiere ==
Paramount Pictures, Benny's radio show's sponsor Jell-O, Young & Rubicam (Jell-O's advertising agency) and NBC staged a lavish premiere in Benny's hometown, Waukegan, Illinois.

== Reception ==
Time described it thus: "As lavish, tuneful, talent-packed as a good radio variety hour, Man About Town is just about as entertaining, just about as memorable." In her 2017 book Jack Benny and the Golden Age of American Radio Comedy, media studies professor Kathryn H. Fuller-Seeley wrote that "Man About Town, a lightweight film, was far funnier and fresher than anybody had anticipated." Then-Senator Harry S. Truman saw the movie in Washington, and wrote in a letter home to his wife that he enjoyed it.

Silver Screen magazine called it "the best of the Jack Benny pictures. It has swell gags, sprightly dialogue, and some pleasing acting by Jack—but lordy, lordy, it's Rochester who fairly wraps up the picture and takes it home. Others also praised Anderson, who played Benny's valet Rochester in the radio program. Cue magazine stated that the "brightest star in the picture is, oddly enough, not Benny but ... Eddie Anderson." Screenland magazine wrote that "Jack Benny's best picture is not his picture at all, but Rochester's." Howard Barnes wrote in the New York Herald Tribune that "you are likely to come away from the picture remembering the colored player's laugh-provoking and versatile performance as vividly or more vividly than the star's."

However, playwright and author Thomas Hischak disagrees, writing in 1939: Hollywood's Greatest Year, "Considering the talent involved—director Mark Sandrich, screenwriter Morrie Ryskind, songwriters Frank Loesser, Friedrich Hollaender, Matty Malneck, and players Eddie 'Rochester' Anderson, Betty Grable, Monty Woolley, and Phil Harris—the movie should have been much better than it ended up."

Paramount, seeing how successful Man About Town was, immediately produced another film starring the radio cast, Buck Benny Rides Again, released the following year.
