= Milt Josefsberg =

American screenwriter (1911–1987)

- Born: Milton Josefsberg; June 29, 1911; New York City, New York, U.S.
- Died: December 14, 1987 (aged 76); Burbank, California, U.S.
- Resting place: Mount Sinai Memorial Park Cemetery
- Occupation: radio/television screenwriter/producer
- Years active: 1938–1987

Milt Josefsberg (June 29, 1911 – December 14, 1987) was an American screenwriter.

== Career ==
Milt Josefsberg's first big break came in 1938, when he was hired as writer on Bob Hope's radio program. Five years later, in the summer of 1943, he left Hope and took over as one of four new writers on The Jack Benny Program on the radio. At the time, Benny's two main writers, Bill Morrow and Ed Beloin, had just recently left the show. Josefsberg was to remain with Jack Benny for twelve years, until the closure of Benny's radio program in 1955. During his long association with Benny, Josefsberg would collaborate with all of Benny's other writers, although he tended to work most closely with John Tackaberry. From the early 1950s, he also worked on Benny's TV show. Even after his partnership with Benny officially ended, Josefsberg would reportedly write stand-up material for Benny on occasion in the 1960s.

From the mid-1950s onward, Josefsberg worked as a writer for many television sitcoms, such as The Lucy Show, Here's Lucy, The Odd Couple, All in the Family, and Archie Bunker's Place. Jim Wickey of The Green House, The Rip Borsley Show once commented about Josefsberg:

"Milt Josefsberg is an American success story. I doubt I would be writing if I had not been influenced by Milt, and I know that can be said for many of today's writers. The WGA picket line would be thinner without him!"

Also a producer and script reader, Josefsberg, who was called by Mel Shavelson, one-time creative partner and three-time Writers Gould of America (WGA) president "the maven of comedy", did such for the television show, The Joey Bishop Show from 1961 to 1965, the film Butterfly (1979), as well as the TV series, You Can't Take It with You which ran from 1987 to 1988. In later years, he also penned the books The Jack Benny Show (1977), reminiscing about his years as a writer on Benny's radio and TV shows, and Comedy Writing for Television and Hollywood.

== Family life and death ==
Josefsberg and his wife Hilda had two sons, Steven and Alan. Alan had two children, Suzi and Dean. Josefberg's great-grandchildren, Amber and Taylor Ellison (Suzi's) and Mason and Matthew Josefsberg (Dean's), live today in Southern California. Josefsberg died in Burbank, California.
