= Artie Auerbach =

Photographer, actor and comedian (1903–1957)

- Born: Arthur Auerbach; May 17, 1903; New York City, U.S.
- Died: October 3, 1957 (aged 54); Van Nuys, California, U.S.
- Career
- Show: The Jack Benny Program; The Abbott and Costello Show
- Style: Comedian
- Country: United States

Arthur Auerbach (May 17, 1903 – October 3, 1957), was an American comic actor and professional photographer who became famous as "Mr. Kitzel", first on the Al Pearce radio show in 1937 then as a regular on the Jack Benny radio show for 12 years, and on The Abbott and Costello radio show during the 1940s. He also worked with Phil Baker before joining the Jack Benny Show.

== Career ==
=== Press photographer ===
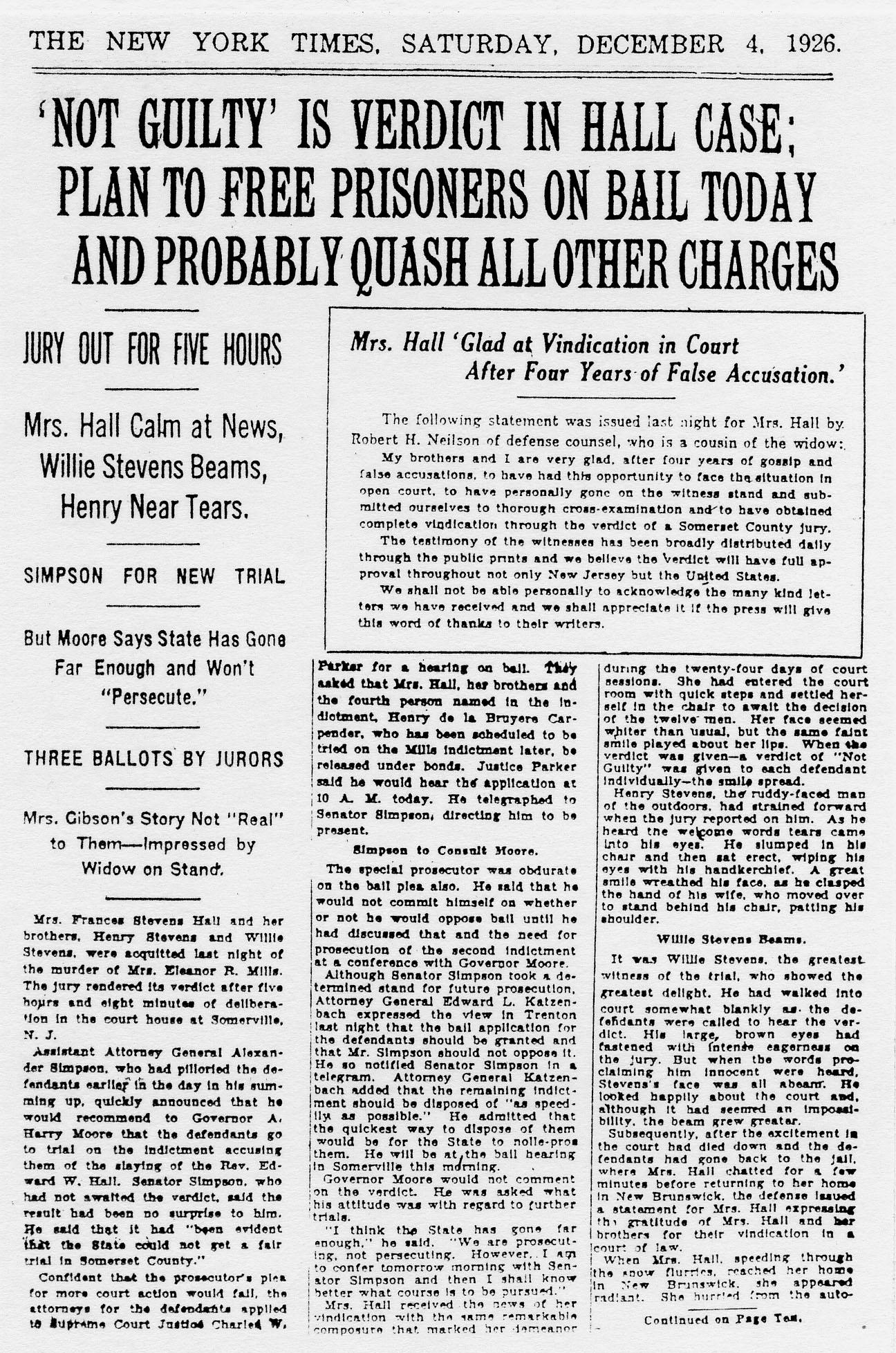
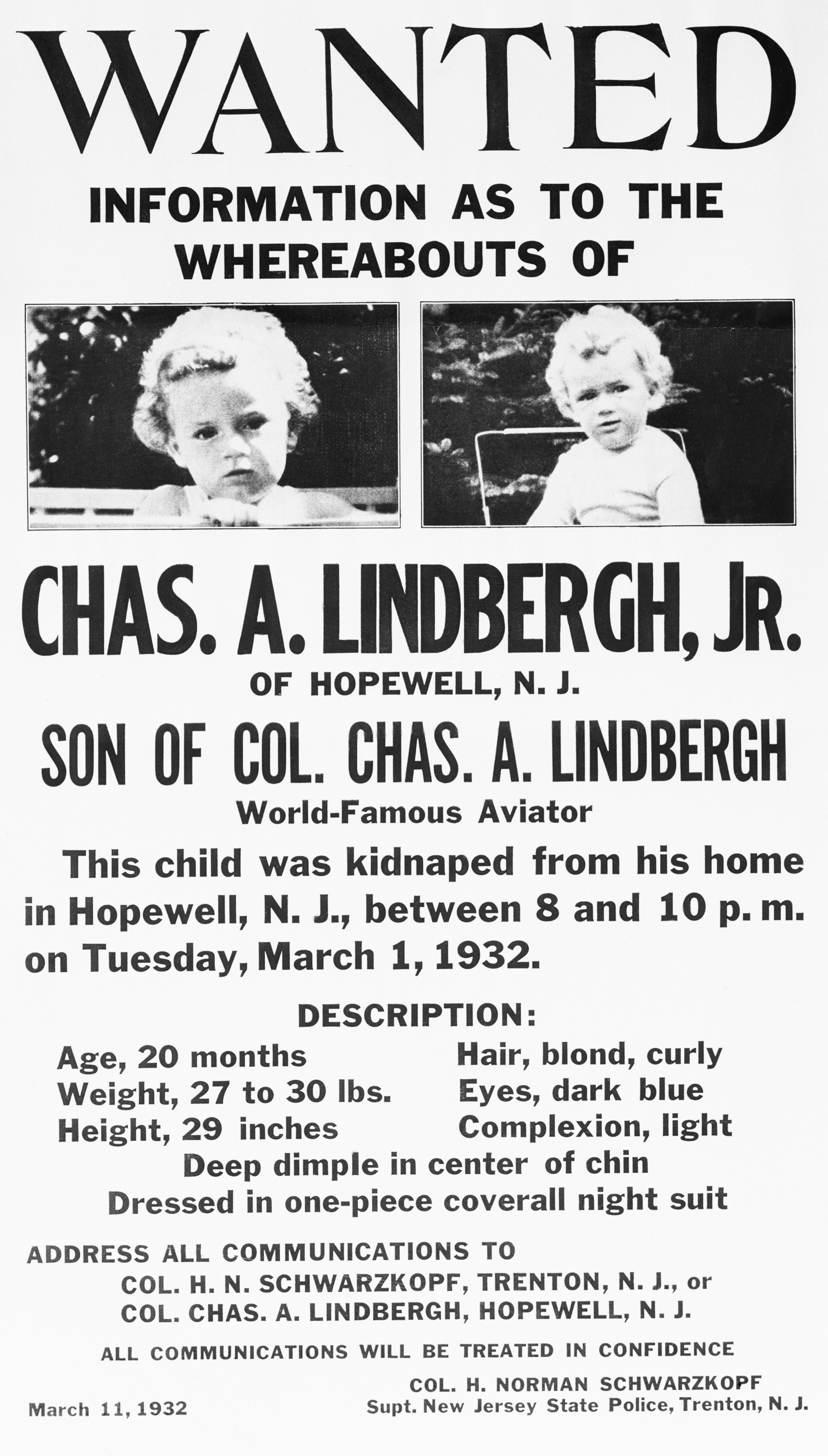
Prior to his career in show business, Auerbach was a press photographer who covered the Hall–Mills murder case and the Lindbergh kidnapping.

Artie Auerbach had a successful career as a reporter and photographer for the New York tabloid Daily Mirror and the New York Daily News. Among the more famous stories he covered were the Lindbergh kidnapping and the Hall–Mills murder case. Reportedly, he once took an illegal picture of a person in the electric chair. While a photographer, Auerbach had become very popular at private parties by telling Yiddish anecdotes. It was during his days as a press photographer when Auerbach had the inspiration for the character that would prove to give him his greatest fame. He was on an assignment at a Bronx drug store when he heard a voice singing a popular song of the time, "Yes, Sir, That's My Baby" with a strong Yiddish dialect and he loved the voice and personality. He took that character and evolved it into the lovable and laughable Mr. Kitzel. Auerbach and the druggist who inspired the character, Maurice Adollf, became long-time close friends. Auerbach described Adollf as "a wealthy man who had found peace of mind ... the thing we are all battling to find." When Auerbach began to find work as a comedian, he didn't quit the newspaper, but simply took a leave of absence. However, even by 1941, despite then appearing regularly on various radio programs, he still felt insecure about his future in show business and asked his newspaper for his seventh consecutive leave of absence.

=== Comedian ===
Auerbach's career in show business began when he was discovered by Phil Baker who loved his dialect humor. Auerbach was a master of some 30 dialects. Baker introduced Auerbach to Lew Brown, and in 1934 he made his stage debut in the Broadway revue Calling All Stars as a hillbilly. Auerbach had first submitted comedy sketches for Brown with the intention of selling the material. However, Brown agreed to use them only if Auerbach performed them himself. It was at this point the character of Mr. Kitzel, which means "to tickle or make laugh" in Yiddish, was first performed.

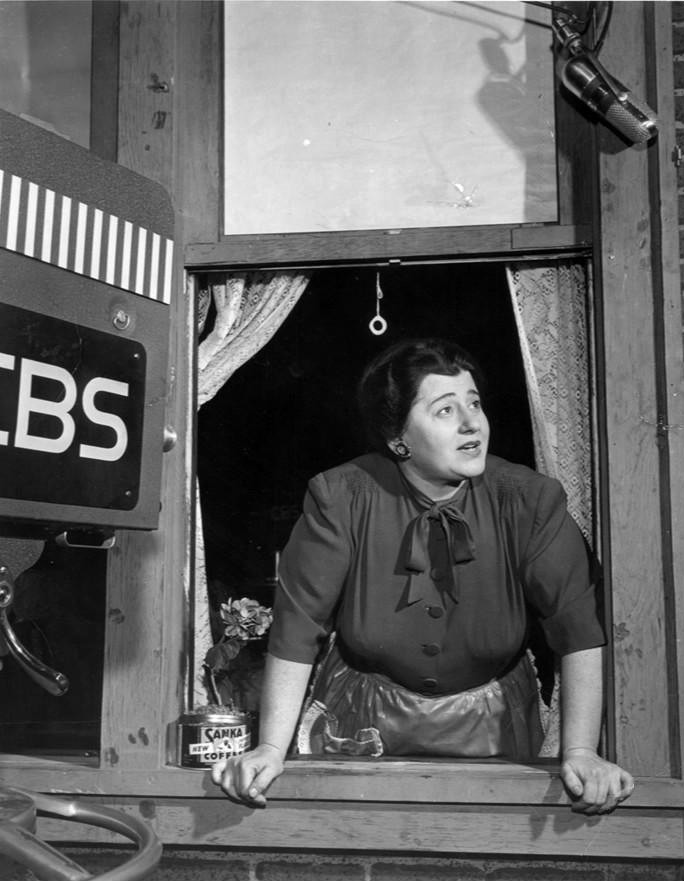
Auerbach was a regular on the popular Goldbergs radio show.

Auerbach was then cast in the hugely popular radio program The Goldbergs and its predecessor House of Glass (1935). His work included a regular role on CBS' The Wonder Show (whose sponsor was Wonder Bread) with Lucille Ball, Gale Gordon, and Jack Haley in 1938, and appearing as Mr. Kitzel on both The Abbott and Costello Show and in the 1943 film Here Comes Elmer, which featured the cast of the Al Pearce radio program. During World War II he performed overseas with the USO. However, it was his appearances on The Jack Benny Program which brought Auerbach his greatest fame.

==== The Jack Benny Program ====
The Jack Benny Program had previously included a Yiddish-accented character, "Shlepperman," played by Sam Hearn, but it was discontinued in the late 1930s. In 1946 Auerbach was hired as a permanent, although only occasional, Yiddish-accented character Mr. Kitzel. In January he made his first appearance as a hot-dog vendor at a Rose Bowl game Jack was attending. His appearance went over so well with the audience and Benny himself that he returned the next week. As the hot-dog vendor he became famous for the catch phrase, "De pickle in de middle mit de mustard on top." In 1946 this catch phrase was turned into a novelty song written by Jack Benny Program writer John Tackaberry and songwriter Carl Sigman, featuring Auerbach as the singer. With the lyrics "The pickle in the middle with the mustard on top. Just the way you like them and they're all red hot," the song became popular in the late 1940s. The song led to his being named Man of the Year by the National Pickle Packers Association. His other catch phrase was the exclamation "hoo-hoo-hoo-HOOOOO!" usually delivered in response to a question from Jack. Auerbach's Mr. Kitzel was unique among the characters on the show as being the only one not to treat Jack disparagingly. His character moved with the show when it made the transition from radio to television, and he continued to appear until his death.

A typical Benny-Kitzel exchange:

Mr. Kitzel: I'll never forget my wedding. When they said, "If anyone has any objections to this marriage, speak now or forever hold your peace," a voice from the back hollered, "Don't marry her!"
Jack Benny: Oh, my goodness! Who was it?
Mr. Kitzel: Me, I'm a ventriloquist.

== Personal life and death ==
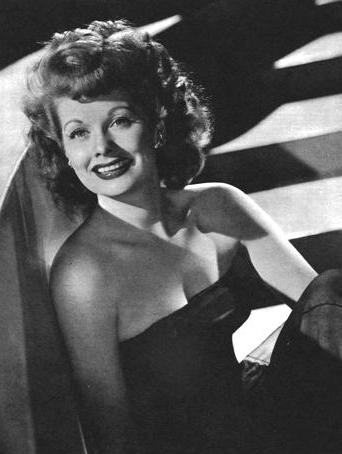
In 1938, RKO starlet Lucille Ball interceded in the marriage between Auerbach and her cousin. Auerbach had been a regular on Ball's radio show.

Artie Auerbach was born in New York City of Polish Jewish descent. His father, Wolfgang, was a dancer in London, England, and died at a young age. As a youth, Artie spoke Yiddish in the family home, but, when speaking English, he did not have the accent for which he would later become famous. He was self-educated from patronizing the New York Public Library. He had two sisters.

Ed Sullivan's column of March 29, 1938 announced that Auerbach would be marrying Cleo Manning (later Cleo Morgan then Smith). A young actress, Manning achieved some notoriety when she made her screen debut by being kissed by Clark Gable in the 1941 film Honky Tonk. Cleo Manning's cousin, Lucille Ball, at the time a blonde RKO star, interceded in the marriage, because Manning was not of age. They were at the license bureau when Ball persuaded them to wait. Auerbach and Manning were later married.

Auerbach's second wife, Doris, was much younger than he, and they never had children.

On October 3, 1957, Artie Auerbach died of a heart attack at 54 years of age in Van Nuys, California. He had entered the West Valley Community Hospital the previous day as an emergency patient. On the day of his death, Auerbach had been scheduled to begin rehearsals for a part on the Jack Benny television show. He was survived by his wife, Doris, and two sisters.

== In popular culture ==
Mr. Kitzel's catch phrase "hoo-hoo-hoo HOOOOO!" was uttered in the 1957 Looney Tunes cartoon Now, Hare This. It was said by both The Big Bad Wolf and by Bugs Bunny, voiced by Mel Blanc. He was also quoted multiple times in various other Looney Tunes cartoons.
