= List of The Jack Benny Program episodes =

This is a list of the 261 episodes for the television version of The Jack Benny Program, as opposed to the radio program of the same name.

== Series overview ==
Season	Episodes	Originally released			Rank	Rating
Season	Episodes	First released	Last released	Network	Rank	Rating
1	4	October 10, 1950	May 5, 1951	CBS	—N/a	—N/a
2	6	November 11, 1951	June 6, 1952	CBS	9	42.8
3	8	October 10, 1952	May 5, 1953	CBS	12	39.0
4	13	September 9, 1953	May 5, 1954	CBS	16	33.3
5	16	October 10, 1954	May 5, 1955	CBS	7	38.3
6	16	September 9, 1955	April 4, 1956	CBS	5	37.2
7	16	September 9, 1956	April 4, 1957	CBS	10	32.3
8	16	September 9, 1957	April 4, 1958	CBS	28	27.1
9	15	September 9, 1958	April 4, 1959	CBS	—N/a	—N/a
10	15	October 10, 1959	May 5, 1960	CBS	—N/a	—N/a
11	26	October 10, 1960	April 4, 1961	CBS	10	26.2
12	26	October 10, 1961	April 4, 1962	CBS	—N/a	—N/a
13	27	September 9, 1962	April 4, 1963	CBS	11	26.2 (Note: Tied with Dr. Kildare)
14	28	September 9, 1963	April 4, 1964	CBS	12	25.0 (Note: Tied with I've Got a Secret and Lassie)
15	28	September 9, 1964	April 4, 1965	NBC	—N/a	—N/a

== Episodes ==
=== Season 1 (1950–51) ===
No. overall	No. in season	Title	Original release date
1	1	"Premiere Show"	October 28, 1950
2	2	"Faye Emerson and Frank Sinatra Show"	January 28, 1951
3	3	"Claudette Colbert and Basil Rathbone Show"	April 1, 1951
4	4	"Ben Hogan Show"	May 20, 1951

=== Season 2 (1951–52) ===
No. overall	No. in season	Title	Original release date
5	1	"Dorothy Shay"	November 4, 1951
6	2	"Helene Francois Show"	December 16, 1951
7	3	"Gaslight"	January 27, 1952
8	4	"Gracie Bit"	March 9, 1952
9	5	"Isaac Stern Show"	April 20, 1952
10	6	"Jack Prepares for a Trip to England"	June 1, 1952

=== Season 3 (1952–53) ===
No. overall	No. in season	Title	Original release date
11	1	"Bob Crosby's Contract"	October 5, 1952
12	2	"Buck Benny Rides Again"	November 2, 1952
13	3	"Jack Gets Robbed"	November 30, 1952
14	4	"Cafe Skit"	December 28, 1952
15	5	"60 Piece Orchestra Skit"	January 25, 1953
16	6	"Dr. Jekyll and Mr. Hyde"	March 22, 1953
17	7	"Fred Allen Show"	April 19, 1953
18	8	"Visit to the Vault"	May 17, 1953

=== Season 4 (1953–54) ===
No. overall	No. in season	Title	Original release date
19	1	"Honolulu Trip"	September 13, 1953
20	2	"Jack as a Child"	October 4, 1953
21	3	"Humphrey Bogart Show"	October 25, 1953
22	4	"Johnny Ray Show"	November 15, 1953
23	5	"Irene Dunne Show"	December 6, 1953
24	6	"Reminiscing About Last New Year's"	December 27, 1953
25	7	"Liberace Show"	January 17, 1954
26	8	"Jack Dreams He's Married to Mary"	February 7, 1954
27	9	"Helen Hayes Show"	February 28, 1954
28	10	"Goldie, Fields and Glide"	March 21, 1954
29	11	"Burns and Allen Show"	April 11, 1954
30	12	"David Niven Show"	May 2, 1954
31	13	"Road to Nairobi"	May 23, 1954

=== Season 5 (1954–55) ===
No. overall	No. in season	Title	Original release date
32	1	"Entire Cast Show"	October 3, 1954
33	2	"Jam Session at Jack's"	October 17, 1954
34	3	"How Jack Found Mary"	October 31, 1954
35	4	"The Giant Mutiny"	November 14, 1954
36	5	"The Life of Jack Benny"	November 28, 1954
37	6	"Jack Does Christmas Shopping Show"	December 12, 1954
38	7	"San Diego Naval Training Center Show"	December 26, 1954
39	8	"Bedroom Burglar"	January 9, 1955
40	9	"Jack and Gisele MacKenzie's Violin Duet"	January 23, 1955
41	10	"Four O'Clock in the Morning Show"	February 6, 1955
42	11	"Jack's Lunch Counter"	February 20, 1955
43	12	"Jack Takes Beavers to the Fair"	March 6, 1955
44	13	"Gary Crosby Show"	March 20, 1955
45	14	"You Bet Your Life"	April 3, 1955
46	15	"Preparing for New York Trip"	April 17, 1955
47	16	"Jackie Gleason Show"	May 1, 1955

=== Season 6 (1955–56) ===
No. overall	No. in season	Title	Original release date
48	1	"Jack Goes to Dennis' House"	September 25, 1955
49	2	"Massage and Date with Gertrude"	October 9, 1955
50	3	"Peggy King and Art Linkletter"	October 23, 1955
51	4	"Isaac Stern Boosts Jack's Morale"	November 6, 1955
52	5	"Jack Gives Johnny Carson Advice"	November 20, 1955
53	6	"Jack Hunts for Uranium"	December 4, 1955
54	7	"Frances and Edgar Bergen"	December 18, 1955
55	8	"New Year's Day Show"	January 1, 1956
56	9	"Don Invites Gang to Dinner"	January 15, 1956
57	10	"How Jack Met Rochester"	January 29, 1956
58	11	"William Holden / Frances Bergen Show"	February 12, 1956
59	12	"Rochester Sleeps Through Jack's Show"	February 26, 1956
60	13	"Jack Drives to Palm Springs"	March 11, 1956
61	14	"Jack Opens Beverly Hills Office"	March 25, 1956
62	15	"Gisele MacKenzie Show"	April 8, 1956
63	16	"Jack Tries to Get a Passport"	April 22, 1956

=== Season 7 (1956–57) ===
No. overall	No. in season	Title	Original release date
64	1	"Alfred Wallenstein Show"	September 23, 1956
65	2	"George Burns / Spike Jones Show"	October 7, 1956
66	3	"George Gobel / Red Skelton Show"	October 21, 1956
67	4	"Jack Is Invited to the Ronald Colmans"	November 4, 1956
68	5	"Jack's Maxwell Is Stolen"	November 18, 1956
69	6	"Jack Locked in the Tower of London"	December 2, 1956
70	7	"The Mikado"	December 16, 1956
71	8	"Talent Show"	December 30, 1956
72	9	"Jack and Mary in Rome"	January 13, 1957
73	10	"The Fiddler"	January 27, 1957
74	11	"Goodwin Knight / George Jessel Show"	February 10, 1957
75	12	"Hope and Benny in Agent's Office"	February 24, 1957
76	13	"Jack Falls Into a Canal in Venice"	March 10, 1957
77	14	"Jack in Paris"	March 24, 1957
78	15	"Mary's May Company Reunion"	April 7, 1957
79	16	"Visit from the IRS"	April 21, 1957

=== Season 8 (1957–58) ===
No. overall	No. in season	Title	Original release date
80	1	"First Show of the Season"	September 22, 1957
81	2	"The Airport"	October 6, 1957
82	3	"Hal March Show"	October 20, 1957
83	4	"Ginger Rogers Show"	November 3, 1957
84	5	"John Forsythe Show"	November 17, 1957
85	6	"Jack's Life Story"	December 1, 1957
86	7	"Christmas Shopping Show"	December 15, 1957
87	8	"Jack Goes to the Rose Bowl"	December 29, 1957
88	9	"Jack Takes a Beaver to the Dentist"	January 12, 1958
89	10	"Honeymooners Show"	January 26, 1958
90	11	"Jack at the Races"	February 9, 1958
91	12	"Violin Competition with Gisele MacKenzie"	February 23, 1958
92	13	"Academy Awards"	March 9, 1958
93	14	"Railroad Station Show"	March 23, 1958
94	15	"Ronnie Burns Show"	April 6, 1958
95	16	"Hillbilly Act"	April 20, 1958

=== Season 9 (1958–59) ===
No. overall	No. in season	Title	Original release date
96	1	"Gary Cooper Show"	September 21, 1958
97	2	"Phil Harris Show"	October 5, 1958
98	3	"The Millionaire"	October 19, 1958
99	4	"Stars' Wives Show"	November 2, 1958
100	5	"Bachelor TV Lives"	November 16, 1958
101	6	"Jack Goes to the Doctor"	November 30, 1958
102	7	"Jack and Gisele MacKenzie"	December 14, 1958
103	8	"Christmas Gift Exchange"	December 28, 1958
104	9	"Autolight"	January 11, 1959
105	10	"Ernie Kovacs Show"	January 25, 1959
106	11	"Jack Goes to a Nightclub"	February 8, 1959
107	12	"Airport Sketch"	February 22, 1959
108	13	"Panel Discussion Show"	March 8, 1959
109	14	"Edgar Bergen Show"	March 22, 1959
110	15	"Ed Sullivan / Genevieve Show"	April 5, 1959

=== Season 10 (1959–60) ===
No. overall	No. in season	Title	Original release date
111	1	"The Jack Benny Program 30 Years in the Future"	October 4, 1959
112	2	"Harry Truman Show"	October 18, 1959
113	3	"Jack Webb Show"	November 1, 1959
114	4	"Mr. and Mrs. Jimmy Stewart Show"	November 15, 1959
115	5	"Jack Paar Show"	November 29, 1959
116	6	"Jack Goes to a Pasadena Fan Club Meeting"	December 13, 1959
117	7	"George Burns Show"	December 27, 1959
118	8	"Ben Blue Show"	January 10, 1960
119	9	"Maurice Gosfield / Amateur Show"	January 24, 1960
120	10	"George Gobel Show"	February 7, 1960
121	11	"Jack Is Arrested"	February 21, 1960
122	12	"Natalie Wood / Robert Wagner Show"	March 6, 1960
123	13	"Slogan Contest"	April 3, 1960
124	14	"Easter Show"	April 17, 1960
125	15	"Final Show of the Season"	May 1, 1960

=== Season 11 (1960–61) ===
No. overall	No. in season	Title	Original release date
126	1	"Nightbeat Takeoff"	October 16, 1960
127	2	"Dick Clark Show"	October 23, 1960
128	3	"Milton Berle Show"	October 30, 1960
129	4	"Hong Kong Suit"	November 6, 1960
130	5	"John Wayne Show"	November 20, 1960
131	6	"Joey Bishop Show"	November 27, 1960
132	7	"Lunch Counter Murder"	December 4, 1960
133	8	"Jack Goes to a Concert"	December 11, 1960
134	9	"Jack Goes Christmas Shopping"	December 18, 1960
135	10	"Amateur Show"	December 25, 1960
136	11	"Jack Casting for Television Special"	January 1, 1961
137	12	"Jack Goes to the Vault"	January 8, 1961
138	13	"Don's 27th Anniversary with Jack"	January 15, 1961
139	14	"Jack at the Supermarket"	January 22, 1961
140	15	"Jack Is Hypnotized"	January 29, 1961
141	16	"Jack Goes to a Gym"	February 5, 1961
142	17	"Death Row Sketch"	February 12, 1961
143	18	"Musicale"	February 19, 1961
144	19	"Jack Becomes a Surgeon"	February 26, 1961
145	20	"Detective Story"	March 5, 1961
146	21	"Children's Version of the Show"	March 12, 1961
147	22	"Jack Goes to Las Vegas"	March 19, 1961
148	23	"Dance Contest"	March 26, 1961
149	24	"Variety Show"	April 2, 1961
150	25	"Main Street Shelter"	April 9, 1961
151	26	"English Sketch"	April 16, 1961

=== Season 12 (1961–62) ===
No. overall	No. in season	Title	Original release date
152	1	"Season Premiere"	October 15, 1961
153	2	"Waukegan Show"	October 22, 1961
154	3	"Jack on Trial for Murder"	November 5, 1961
155	4	"Jack Takes the Stewarts to a Play"	November 12, 1961
156	5	"Tennessee Ernie Ford Show"	November 19, 1961
157	6	"Jack Plays Golf"	November 26, 1961
158	7	"Jack Is Followed Home"	December 3, 1961
159	8	"Jack Goes to the Cafeteria"	December 10, 1961
160	9	"Jack Writes a Song"	December 17, 1961
161	10	"Christmas Party"	December 24, 1961
162	11	"New Year's Eve"	December 31, 1961
163	12	"Jack Does Opera"	January 7, 1962
164	13	"Dennis Day's Surprise Birthday Party"	January 14, 1962
165	14	"Jack Gets a Passport"	January 21, 1962
166	15	"How Jack Met Rochester"	January 28, 1962
167	16	"Police Station Show"	February 4, 1962
168	17	"Ghost Town Western"	February 11, 1962
169	18	"Rock Hudson Show"	February 18, 1962
170	19	"Julie London Show"	March 4, 1962
171	20	"Alexander Hamilton Show"	March 11, 1962
172	21	"Shari Lewis Show"	March 18, 1962
173	22	"Crazy Airport"	March 25, 1962
174	23	"Jack Goes Back Into Pictures"	April 1, 1962
175	24	"Jack Is a Violin Teacher"	April 8, 1962
176	25	"Modern Prison Sketch"	April 15, 1962
177	26	"Jack Takes in a Boarder"	April 22, 1962

=== Season 13 (1962–63) ===
No. overall	No. in season	Title	Original release date
178	1	"Sammy Davis, Jr. Show"	September 25, 1962
179	2	"Frank Sinatra, Jr. Show"	October 2, 1962
180	3	"Phil Silvers Show"	October 9, 1962
181	4	"Air Force Sketch"	October 16, 1962
182	5	"Lawrence Welk Show"	October 23, 1962
183	6	"My Gang Comedy"	October 30, 1962
184	7	"Jack Plays Tarzan"	November 13, 1962
185	8	"Jack Gives a Dinner Party"	November 20, 1962
186	9	"Jack Meets a Japanese Agent"	November 27, 1962
187	10	"Jack and Bob Hope in Vaudeville"	December 4, 1962
188	11	"Jack Referees a Wrestling Match"	December 11, 1962
189	12	"Jack and the Crying Cab Driver"	December 18, 1962
190	13	"The Story of the New Talent Show"	December 25, 1962
191	14	"Jack Attends the Rose Bowl"	January 1, 1963
192	15	"Jack Meets Max Bygraves"	January 8, 1963
193	16	"Twilight Zone Sketch"	January 15, 1963
194	17	"Peter Lorre / Joanie Sommers Show"	January 22, 1963
195	18	"The Murder of Clayton Worthington"	January 29, 1963
196	19	"Jack Rents His House"	February 5, 1963
197	20	"Spanish Sketch"	February 12, 1963
198	21	"Connie Francis Show"	February 19, 1963
199	22	"Jack Does the U.S.O. Show"	February 26, 1963
200	23	"Frankie Avalon Show"	March 5, 1963
201	24	"Jack Is Kidnapped"	March 12, 1963
202	25	"Jack Fires Don"	March 19, 1963
203	26	"The Mikado"	March 26, 1963
204	27	"A Dummy Replaces Jack"	April 2, 1963
205	28	"Jack Answers Request Letters"	April 9, 1963

=== Season 14 (1963–64) ===
No. overall	No. in season	Title	Original release date
206	1	"Billy Graham Show"	September 24, 1963
207	2	"Robert Goulet Show"	October 1, 1963
208	3	"Riverboat Sketch"	October 8, 1963
209	4	"Tall Cowboy Sketch"	October 15, 1963
210	5	"Johnny Carson Show"	October 22, 1963
211	6	"Jack Directs a Film"	October 29, 1963
212	7	"Ed Sullivan Show"	November 5, 1963
213	8	"Robinson Crusoe Sketch"	November 19, 1963
214	9	"Jack Takes a Boat to Hawaii"	November 26, 1963
215	10	"Dennis Drives Jack to the Hospital"	December 3, 1963
216	11	"Three Musketeers Sketch"	December 10, 1963
217	12	"George Jessel / Amateur Show"	December 24, 1963
218	13	"Jack Alone on New Year's Eve"	December 31, 1963
219	14	"How Jack Met George Burns"	January 7, 1964
220	15	"Peter, Paul and Mary Show"	January 14, 1964
221	16	"Nat King Cole Show"	January 21, 1964
222	17	"Bobby Darin Show"	January 28, 1964
223	18	"Don Breaks His Leg"	February 4, 1964
224	19	"How Jack Found Dennis"	February 11, 1964
225	20	"The Final LeBlanc Sketch"	February 18, 1964
226	21	"Jack and Dennis Do Impersonations"	February 25, 1964
227	22	"Jack Redecorates His House"	March 3, 1964
228	23	"Jack Is a Boxing Manager"	March 17, 1964
229	24	"Jack Renews His Driver's License"	March 24, 1964
230	25	"The Lettermen Show"	March 31, 1964
231	26	"Jack Goes to an Allergy Doctor"	April 7, 1964
232	27	"Harlow Gets a Date"	April 14, 1964
233	28	"I Am the Fiddler"	April 21, 1964

=== Season 15 (1964–65) ===
No. overall	No. in season	Title	Original release date
234	1	"NBC Premiere"	September 25, 1964
235	2	"Lucille Ball Show"	October 2, 1964
236	3	"Andy Williams Show"	October 9, 1964
237	4	"Income Tax Show"	October 16, 1964
238	5	"Jack Makes a Comedy Record"	October 23, 1964
239	6	"Hillbilly Sketch"	October 30, 1964
240	7	"Jungle Sketch"	November 6, 1964
241	8	"Jack Loses a Raffle"	November 13, 1964
242	9	"The Cat Burglar"	November 20, 1964
243	10	"Jack Hires a Cook"	November 27, 1964
244	11	"Wayne Newton / Louis Nye Show"	December 4, 1964
245	12	"Jack Has a Sick Alligator"	December 11, 1964
246	13	"Amateur Night"	December 18, 1964
247	14	"One Man Show"	December 25, 1964
248	15	"Jack Jones Show"	January 8, 1965
249	16	"Jack Adopts a Son"	January 22, 1965
250	17	"Kingston Trio Show"	January 29, 1965
251	18	"Jack Visits House of Monkeys"	February 5, 1965
252	19	"The Stradivarius Story"	February 12, 1965
253	20	"Jack Joins Acrobats"	February 19, 1965
254	21	"Rainy Day in Palm Springs"	February 26, 1965
255	22	"Jack Brings Ed Up from the Vault"	March 5, 1965
256	23	"Jack Finds a Double"	March 12, 1965
257	24	"Jack's Navy Buddy Returns"	March 19, 1965
258	25	"Dennis Opens a Bank Account"	March 26, 1965
259	26	"Jack Appears on a Panel Show"	April 2, 1965
260	27	"Jack Has Dog Trouble"	April 9, 1965
261	28	"Smothers Brothers Show"	April 16, 1965
