= The Jack Benny Program =

US radio–TV comedy series

- Jack Benny, Mary Livingstone, and Eddie Anderson (Rochester) in a group portrait
- Other names: The Jack Benny Show; The Canada Dry Program; The Chevrolet Program; The General Tire Revue; The Jell-O Program; The Grape Nuts Flakes Program; The Lucky Strike Program
- Genre: Comedy
- Running time: 30 minutes
- Country of origin: United States
- Language: English
- Home station: NBC (Blue) (05/02/32–10/26/32); CBS (10/30/32–1/26/33); NBC (Red) (03/03/33–09/28/34); NBC (Blue) (10/14/34–06/21/36); NBC (Red) (10/04/36–12/26/48); CBS (01/02/49–05/22/55)
- TV adaptations: The Jack Benny Program (1950–1965)
- Starring: Jack Benny; Mary Livingstone; Eddie Anderson; Phil Harris; Dennis Day; Kenny Baker; Mel Blanc; Frank Nelson; Artie Auerbach; Bea Benaderet; Sara Berner; Joseph Kearns; Sheldon Leonard
- Announcer: Don Wilson
- Written by: Harry Conn; Al Boasberg; William Morrow; Edmund Beloin; Hugh Wedlock Jr. Howard Snyder; George Balzer; Sam Perrin; Milt Josefsberg; John Tackaberry; Al Gordon; Hal Goldman
- Produced by: Hilliard Marks (1946–1955)
- Original release: May 2, 1932 – May 22, 1955
- No. of episodes: 931
- Opening theme: "Love in Bloom"/"The Yankee Doodle Boy"
- Ending theme: "Hooray for Hollywood" "The J & M Stomp"

The Jack Benny Program, starring Jack Benny, is a radio and television comedy series. The show ran for over three decades, from 1932 to 1955 on radio, and from 1950 to 1965 on television. It won numerous awards, including the 1959 and 1961 Emmy Awards for Best Comedy Series, and is generally regarded as a high-water mark in 20th-century American comedy.

Throughout his career, Jack Benny played the same character: A pompous, vain, and stingy man who played the violin badly but was convinced of his own talent. Although technically the star of his show, Benny was constantly the butt of jokes from his cast members, including Mary Livingstone (Sayde Marks Benny, his real-life wife); Phil Harris, his band leader; Kenny Baker or Dennis Day, his tenors; Don Wilson, his portly announcer; and Rochester Van Jones (Eddie Anderson), his African American valet.

As radio historian John Dunning explains, "Unlike Bob Hope, Jack Benny didn't tell jokes. On his show, Jack was the joke. Everything revolved around him and his comic foibles, with Benny serving as 'straight man.' The other characters on the show were the comedians, making wisecracks, remarks, and asides about Benny's stinginess, his vanity, or his lousy violin-playing."

== Format ==
On both television and radio, The Jack Benny Program used a loose show-within-a-show format, wherein the main characters were playing versions of themselves. The show often broke the fourth wall, with the characters interacting with the audience and commenting on the program and its advertisements.

In his first years on radio (c. 1932–1935), Jack Benny followed the format of many other radio comedians, standing at the microphone, telling jokes and stories, and introducing band numbers. As the characters of Jack and his cast became more defined, the show took on a "variety show" format, blending sketch comedy and musical interludes.

The show usually opened with announcer Don Wilson doing a commercial for the sponsor (e.g. Jell-O or Grape Nuts Flakes), accompanied by a musical number from the orchestra. Wilson would then introduce Jack Benny as the "Master of Ceremonies" and banter with him. Gradually, the rest of the cast members—including Mary Livingstone, bandleader Phil Harris, and tenor Kenny Baker or Dennis Day—would "walk on" to join the conversation. The banter between Benny and the regulars generally covered the news of the day, Jack's latest exchange in his ongoing feud with Fred Allen, or one of the running jokes on the program, such as Jack's stinginess, his age, or his vanity, Phil's habitual drunkenness, egotism, or illiteracy, Don's obesity, Dennis's stupidity, or Mary's letters from her mother.

As the show progressed, Jack might be interrupted by a phone call from his valet, Rochester (Eddie Anderson), reporting some problem at Benny's home (e.g. with Jack's pet polar bear, Carmichael, or with his crazy wartime boarder, Mr. Billingsley). Occasionally, Andy Devine or the Jewish character, Schlepperman (Sam Hearn), would make an appearance. At some point, Jack would tell the tenor that it was time for their singing number ("Sing, Kenny!" or "Dennis, let's have your song."). Don Wilson would insert another commercial for the sponsor, and the band would do a "Big Band" number (ostensibly led by Phil Harris, although conductor Mahlon Merrick actually led the band).

The second half of the show would be devoted to a comedy sketch. Jack might leave the studio and go home to handle some problem (e.g. getting Carmichael to take his medicine). Or there would be a miniplay (e.g., "Buck Benny Rides Again" or a murder mystery starring Jack as Police Captain O'Benny), or a satire of a current movie (e.g., "Snow White and the Seven Gangsters"). In some episodes, Jack closed the show with brief instructions to his band leader ("Play, Phil."), and the band would play a final musical number, as Don Wilson did a final commercial.

Over the years, The Jack Benny Program evolved into the modern domestic situation comedy form, crafting particular situations and scenarios from the fictionalized life of Jack Benny, the radio star. For example, an entire show might be devoted to Jack taking a violin lesson, instructed by his harried violin teacher, Professor LeBlanc (played by Mel Blanc). Common situations included hosting parties, nights on the town, income-tax time, contract negotiations, "backstage" interactions between Jack and his cast during show rehearsals at the radio studio, traveling in the Maxwell, or traveling by train or plane to and from Jack's many personal appearances throughout the country (hence the "Train leaving on track five" running gag).

The sitcom shows usually opened at Jack's house in Beverly Hills, with Jack handling some common domestic task (e.g. Spring cleaning or organizing the pantry), with help from Rochester. As the show progressed, Jack would receive visits or phone calls from Mary Livingstone, Phil Harris or Bob Crosby (who replaced Harris as the radio show's "band leader" in 1952), and Dennis Day. Following an exchange with Day, Benny would order him to "rehearse" a song ("Let's hear the song that you're going to sing on my show tomorrow night."), and Dennis would sing a number. Don Wilson would bring the Sportsmen Quartet over to Jack's house, to sing a new commercial for the sponsor, Lucky Strike Cigarettes, to Benny's consternation.

Later in the show, Jack might step out to handle some common errand, such as going to the dentist, or visiting a store to buy a new suit, where the dentist or store clerk would inevitably turn out to be Frank Nelson. While on these errands, he might encounter Mr. Kitzel (Artie Auerbach), the race track tout (Sheldon Leonard) or John L.C. Sivoney (Frank Fontaine). In other shows, Jack might fall asleep while reading a book in his study (e.g. "I Stand Condemned" or "The Search for the Elephant's Graveyard"), and dream that he was the star of the story he was reading.

In the 1950s, as The Jack Benny Program gravitated to television, the "domestic sitcom" became the show's standard format, often with Benny introducing the episode onstage. Scripts and storylines from radio show episodes were re-used and adapted for TV episodes, with the writers using visual gags and settings (e.g. Jack's underground vault) that had previously been described on air and left to the radio listeners' imaginations.

== Radio ==
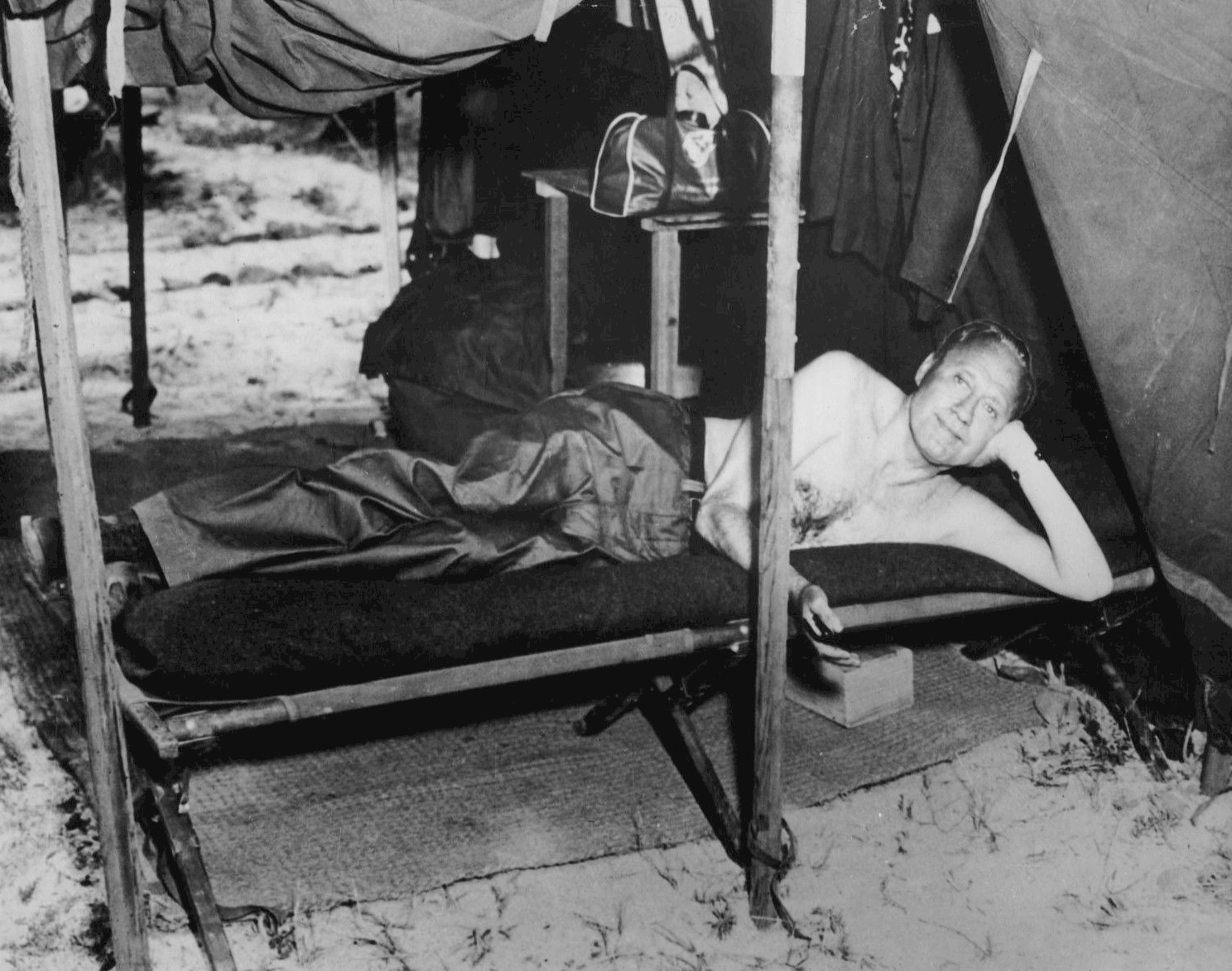
Benny was part of a USO show entertaining US troops in Korea. Here, he relaxes between shows.

Jack Benny first appeared on radio as a guest of Ed Sullivan in March 1932. He was then given his own show later that year, with Canada Dry Ginger Ale as a sponsor – The Canada Dry Ginger Ale Program, beginning May 2, 1932, on the NBC Blue Network and continuing there for six months until October 26, moving the show to CBS on October 30. With Ted Weems leading the band, Benny stayed on CBS until January 26, 1933.

Arriving at NBC on March 3, Benny did The Chevrolet Program until April 1, 1934, with Frank Black leading the band. He continued with The General Tire Revue for the rest of that season, and in the fall of 1934, for General Foods as The Jell-O Program Starring Jack Benny (1934–42), and when sales of Jell-O were affected by sugar rationing during World War II, The Grape Nuts Flakes Program Starring Jack Benny (later the Grape Nuts and Grape Nuts Flakes Program) (1942–44).

On October 1, 1944, the show became The Lucky Strike Program Starring Jack Benny, when American Tobacco's Lucky Strike cigarettes took over as his radio sponsor, through to the mid-1950s. By that time, the practice of using the sponsor's name as the title began to fade.

The show returned to CBS on January 2, 1949, as part of CBS president William S. Paley's "raid" of NBC talent in 1948–49. There it stayed for the remainder of its radio run, which ended on May 22, 1955. CBS aired repeats of previous 1953–55 radio episodes from 1956 to 1958 as The Best of Benny for State Farm Insurance, which later sponsored his television program from 1960 through 1965.

In October, 1934, General Foods agreed to take up sponsorship from the struggling tire-maker, using the show (now airing on the Blue network) to promote its low-selling Jell-O desserts. Beginning from this point, Benny was heard Sunday evenings at 7, at the time seen as a "graveyard slot". However, this was eventually associated with Benny, who appeared in that very time spot for his remaining 21 years on radio (counting his TV shows, he would broadcast on Sundays for a record 28 consecutive years).

In the fall of 1935, Don Bestor was replaced by Johnny Green as the maestro, while Parker was replaced by Michael Bartlett, who himself left after 13 weeks, with Kenny Baker taking over. In early 1936, Harry Conn left the program after creative conflicts with Benny, who had to resort to vaudeville writers Al Boasberg and Edmund Beloin through the end of the season.

In 1936, after a few years of broadcasting from New York, Benny moved the show to Los Angeles, allowing him to bring in guests from among his show-business friends, including Frank Sinatra, James Stewart, Judy Garland, Barbara Stanwyck, Bing Crosby, Burns and Allen (George Burns was Benny's closest friend), and many others. Burns, Allen, and Orson Welles guest-hosted several episodes in March and April 1943 when Benny was ill with pneumonia, while Ronald Colman and his wife Benita Hume appeared often in the 1940s as Benny's long-suffering neighbors.

The 1936–37 season brought many changes instrumental to the development of the show. Aside from having a new writing team (Beloin and Bill Morrow, with script doctoring by Boasberg), Benny returned to the NBC Red Network and established the program in Hollywood. Benny had already done a number of shows on the West Coast for two years – featuring Jimmie Grier as guest conductor – whenever he was doing movie work. Green was replaced by Phil Harris.

During this period, the Benny character gradually became that of the vain, miserly, untalented performer for which he would be recognized, while the "ditzy" role went from Mary to Kenny, and Don Wilson would become the target of jokes about his weight. Halfway through the season, the famous "feud" with Fred Allen began, climaxing with a visit to New York, after which Eddie Anderson was cast as a porter for the train trip back to Los Angeles. His character was so well received that it was decided to have Anderson join the cast as Rochester Van Jones, Benny's valet. In 1939, Kenny Baker chose to leave the show and was replaced by Dennis Day.

In 1941, NBC celebrated Benny's 10th anniversary in radio in an unprecedented manner, broadcasting part of a banquet dedicated to him, in which the network conceded the Sunday 7:00 to 7:30 pm slot to Benny instead of the sponsor, as it was the custom during the Golden Age of Radio.

In 1942, due to sugar shortages during war time, General Foods switched their sponsor product from Jell-O to Grape-Nuts. World War II affected the show as Harris joined the Merchant Marines, being absent from the program from December 1942 until March 1943. That fall, Morrow joined the Army and Beloin left the show; they were replaced by Milt Josefsberg, John Tackaberry, George Balzer, and Cy Howard, the latter of whom was soon replaced by Sam Perrin. The new writers emphasized sitcom situations instead of the film parodies prevalent in earlier years. Also during this time, Hilliard Marks, the brother of Benny's wife, Mary Livingstone, became the show's full-time producer.

In early 1944, Dennis Day enlisted in the Navy, not returning until 1946. He was temporarily replaced by tenor Larry Stevens. In October, 1944, after 10 years with General Foods, American Tobacco's Lucky Strike became Benny's sponsor, an association that lasted until 1959.

The show switched networks to CBS on January 2, 1949, as part of CBS president William S. Paley's notorious "raid" on NBC talent in 1948–49. It stayed there for the remainder of its radio run, ending on May 22, 1955. In 1952, Harris was replaced by Bob Crosby. CBS aired repeat episodes from 1956 to 1958 as The Best of Benny.

=== Sponsors ===
In the early days of radio and in the early television era, airtime was owned by the sponsor, and Benny incorporated the commercials into the body of the show. Sometimes, the sponsors were the butt of jokes, though Benny did not use this device as frequently as his friend and "rival" Fred Allen did then, or as cast member Phil Harris later did on his successful radio sitcom. Nevertheless, for years, Benny insisted in contract negotiations that his writers pen the sponsor's commercial in the middle of the program (leaving the sponsor to provide the opening and closing spots) and the resulting ads were cleverly and wittily worked into the storyline of the show. For example, on one program, Don Wilson accidentally misread Lucky Strike's slogan ("Be happy, go Lucky") as "Be Lucky, go happy", prompting a story arc over several weeks that had Wilson unable to appear on the show due to being traumatized by the error.

In fact, the radio show was generally not announced as The Jack Benny Program. Instead, the primary name of the show tied to the sponsor. Benny's first sponsor was Canada Dry Ginger Ale from 1932 to 1933. Benny's sponsors included Chevrolet from 1933 to 1934, General Tire in 1934, and Jell-O from 1934 to 1942.

The Jell-O Program Starring Jack Benny was so successful in selling Jell-O, that General Foods could not manufacture it quickly enough when sugar shortages arose in the early years of World War II, and the company stopped advertising the dessert mix. General Foods switched the Benny program from Jell-O to Grape-Nuts from 1942 to 1944, and it was The Grape Nuts Program Starring Jack Benny. Benny's longest-running sponsor, was the American Tobacco Company's Lucky Strike cigarettes, from 1944 to 1955, when the show was usually announced as The Lucky Strike Program starring Jack Benny.

=== Writers ===
Benny employed a small group of writers, most of whom stayed with him for many years. This was in contrast to many successful radio or television comedians, such as Bob Hope, who changed writers frequently. One of Benny's writers, George Balzer, noted: "One of the nice things about writing for Jack Benny was that he never denied your existence. On the contrary, he publicized it – not just in conversations, but in interviews and on the air."

Historical accounts like those by longtime Benny writer Milt Josefsberg indicate that Benny's role was essentially as head writer and director of his radio programs, though he was not credited in either capacity. In contrast to Fred Allen, who initially wrote his own radio scripts and extensively rewrote scripts produced in later years by a writing staff, Jack Benny was often described by his writers as a consummate comedy editor rather than a writer per se. George Burns described Benny as "the greatest editor of material in the business. He's got the knack of cutting out all the weak slush and keeping in only the strong, punchy lines."

Jack Benny has a reputation as a master of timing. Since his days in radio, he often explored the limits of timing for comedic purposes, like pausing a disproportionate amount of time before answering a question. Balzer described writing material for Benny as similar to composing music, with one element being the rhythm of delivery as equivalent to musical tempo.

=== Theme music ===
During his early radio shows, no recurring theme was used, with the program instead opening each week with a different then-current popular song. Throughout the Jell-O and Grape-Nuts years, announcer Don Wilson would announce the name of the show, some of the cast, then state "The orchestra opens the program with [name of song]." The orchestra number would continue softly as background for Don Wilson's opening commercial.

Starting in the Lucky Strike era, Benny adopted a medley of "Yankee Doodle Dandy" and "Love in Bloom" as his theme music, opening every show. "Love in Bloom" was later the theme of his television show. His radio shows often ended with the orchestra playing "Hooray for Hollywood". The TV show ended with one of two bouncy instrumentals written for the show by his musical arranger and conductor, Mahlon Merrick.

Benny sometimes joked about the propriety of "Love in Bloom" as his theme song. On a segment often played in Tonight Show retrospectives, Benny talks with Johnny Carson about this. Benny says he has no objections to the song in and of itself, only as his theme. Proving his point, he begins reciting the lyrics slowly and deliberately: "Can it be the trees. That fill the breeze. With rare and magic perfume. Now what the hell has that got to do with me?"

=== Racial attitudes ===
Eddie Anderson was the first black man to have a recurring role in a national radio show, which was significant because at the time, black characters were not uncommonly played by white actors in blackface. Although Eddie Anderson's Rochester may be considered a stereotype by some, his attitudes were unusually sardonic for such a role. As was typical at the time in depicting class distinctions, Rochester always used a formal mode of address to the other (White) characters ("Mr. Benny", "Miss Livingstone") and they always used a familiar mode in speaking to him ("Rochester"), but the formal mode when speaking to him about another White character ("Mr. Benny" when speaking to Rochester but "Jack" when speaking to Jack).

In many routines, Rochester gets the better of Benny, often pricking his boss' ego, or simply outwitting him. The show's portrayal of black characters could be seen as advanced for its time. In a 1956 episode, African American actor Roy Glenn plays a friend of Rochester's, and he is portrayed as a well-educated, articulate man not as the typical "darkie stereotype" seen in many films of the time.

Glenn's role was a recurring one on the series, where he was often portrayed as having to support two people on one unemployment check (i.e., himself and Rochester). Black talent was also showcased, with several guest appearances by The Ink Spots and others. Once, when Benny and his cast and crew were doing a series of shows in New York, the entire cast, including Eddie Anderson, stayed in a prominent New York hotel. Shortly after they decamped at the hotel, a manager told Benny that some White guests from Mississippi had complained to him about Anderson staying in the hotel. He asked Benny to please "do something about it." Benny assured him that he would fix the matter. That evening, Benny moved all his people into another hotel, where Anderson would not be made to feel unwelcome.

=== Line flubs ===
In the Golden Age of Radio, line flubs were common during live broadcasts, especially on a show like The Jack Benny Program, which used sophisticated humor and complex, well-written scripts. When they happened, Jack would laugh along with the audience, ad lib a joke or two, and continue on with the show, although the line flubs clearly annoyed him. When Eddie Anderson, who had a habit of missing rehearsals, would flub his lines on the air, Jack would sometimes shout in mock indignation, "Just one rehearsal! That's all I ask!"

As professional as he was, even Jack himself was not immune to flubs. On the November 6, 1949 episode, in a sketch where he was on a yacht cruise, Jack told the boat captain that he had been "on the Navy" during World War I, instead of "in the Navy." The episode featured so many line flubs that the following week's episode, November 13, was built around Jack calling a meeting of his cast to discuss their mistakes in the previous week's episode.

Mary Livingstone had several flubs that became notorious running gags for weeks after they happened. On the October 27, 1946 episode, during a lunch counter sketch, Mary mistakenly ordered a "chiss sweeze sandwich," instead of a "Swiss cheese sandwich." On the December 3, 1950 episode, Jack told the story of how he met his valet, Rochester. According to Jack, he was driving his car, made a turn into a garage owned by Amos 'n' Andy, and accidentally hit Rochester's car – while it was up on the grease rack. At the end of the show, Mary asked Jack, "How could you possibly hit a car when it was up on the grass reek?"

Unfortunately, these line flubs may have contributed to Mary Livingstone developing a bad case of "mike fright." In the radio show's final years (1952–1955), Mary's character appeared less and less. When the show was transcribed (pre-recorded), Mary's daughter, Joan Benny, would fill in for her mother when the cast recorded the episode in front of a live studio audience, and Mary would later dub in her lines from the safety of her living room at home.

On the broadcast of January 8, 1950, journalist Drew Pearson was the subject of a joke gone wrong. Announcer Don Wilson was supposed to say he heard that Jack bought a new suit on Drew Pearson's broadcast, but accidentally said "Dreer Pooson". Later in the show, comedic actor Frank Nelson was asked by Benny if he was the doorman. Changing his original response at the suggestion of the writers, Nelson said, "Well, who do you think I am, Dreer Pooson?" The audience laughed for almost 30 seconds. (According to several sources on the show, including writer Sam Perrin, Jack collapsed in laughter on hearing Nelson's ad lib, and it was several minutes before he could continue. On the recording of the January 8, 1950 episode, Jack's laughter is not heard. However, since the show was transcribed, it may have been edited out of the final broadcast.)

The line flubs would occasionally cause the show to run overtime. When this happened, Jack would cut the "coda joke" at the end of the episode, and sign off with the customary statement, "We're a little late, so good night, folks."

=== Running gags ===
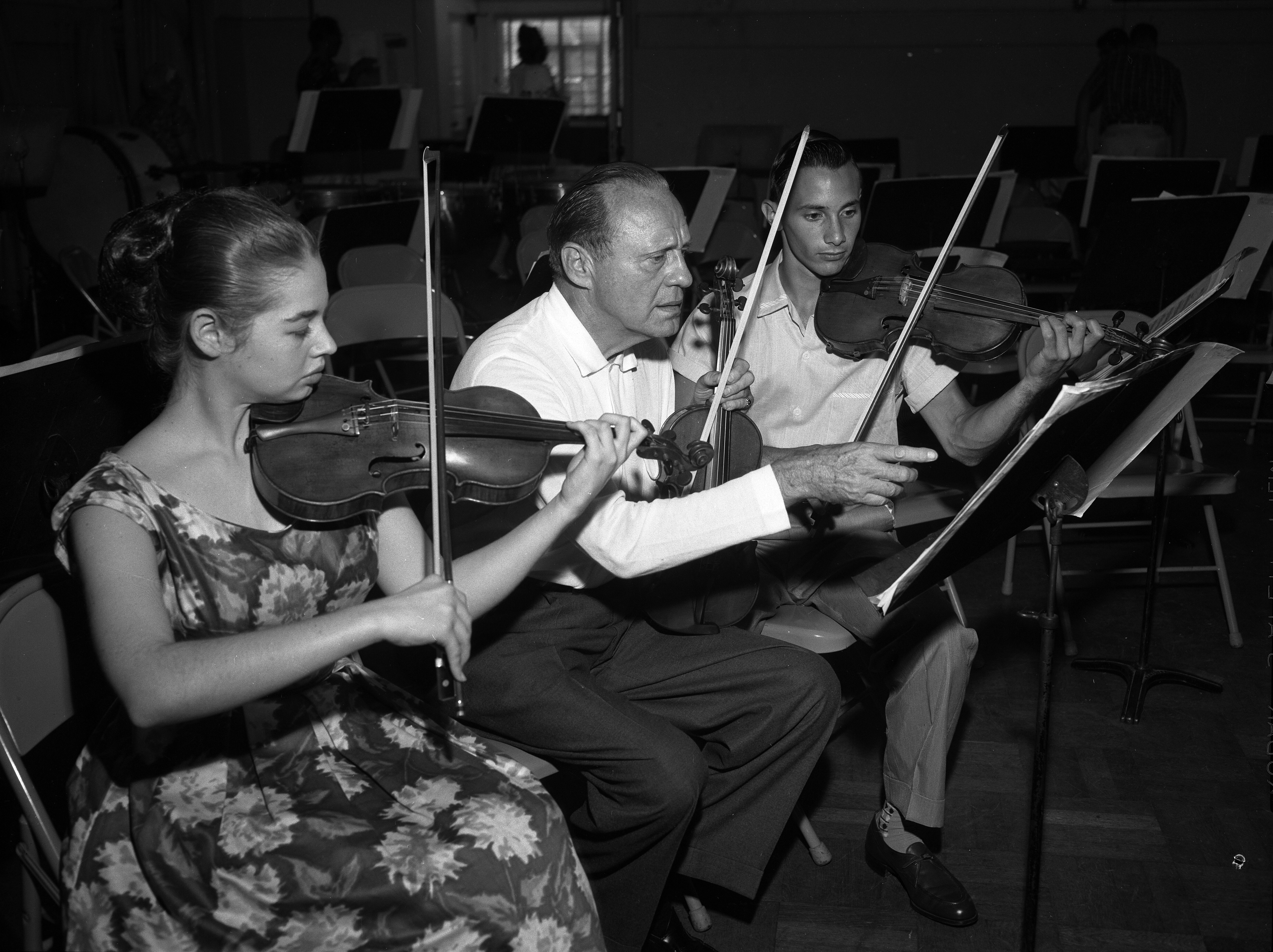
Jack Benny rehearses with members of the California Junior Symphony Orchestra, 1959

Benny's repertoire of running gags included his skinflint radio and television persona, regular cast members' and guest stars' reference to his "baby blue" eyes, always sure to elicit a self-satisfied smirk or patently false attempt at modesty from Benny, perpetually giving his age as 39, and ineptitude at violin playing, most frequently demonstrated by futile attempts to perform Rodolphe Kreutzer's Étude No. 2 in C major.

In fact, Benny was a quite good violinist who achieved the illusion of a bad one, not by deliberately playing poorly, but by striving to play pieces that were too difficult for his skill level. In one of his show's skits, Benny is a USO performer in the Pacific playing his violin when he comes under fire; Benny still plays his violin when two Japanese surrender to him – all the other enemy soldiers committed suicide rather than endure listening to Benny's terrible music.

A skit heard numerous times on radio, and seen many times on television, had Mel Blanc as a Mexican in a sombrero and serape sitting on a bench. Jack Benny sits down and begins a conversation. To each question asked by Benny, Blanc replies Sí. When Benny asks his name, Blanc replies Sy, which would prompt the exchange, Sy?, Sí. And when Benny asks where Blanc is going, Blanc replies, "to see his sister", Sue (Sue?, Sí.), who of course sews for a living (Sew?, Sí.).

A running gag was Benny age always being 39 – a guest on the show was Rod Serling who is the mayor of a town where no one recognizes Benny; Jack runs off screaming for help while Serling breaks the fourth wall and remarks to the audience that anyone who has been 39 for as long as Benny has is a resident of this "Zone" (i.e., Twilight Zone).

A running gag in Benny's private life concerned George Burns. To Benny's eternal frustration, he could never get Burns to laugh. Burns, though, could crack Benny up with the least effort. An example of this occurred at a party when Benny pulled out a match to light a cigar. Burns announced to all, "Jack Benny will now perform the famous match trick!" Benny had no idea what Burns was talking about, so he proceeded to light up. Burns observed, "Oh, a new ending!" and Benny collapsed in helpless laughter.

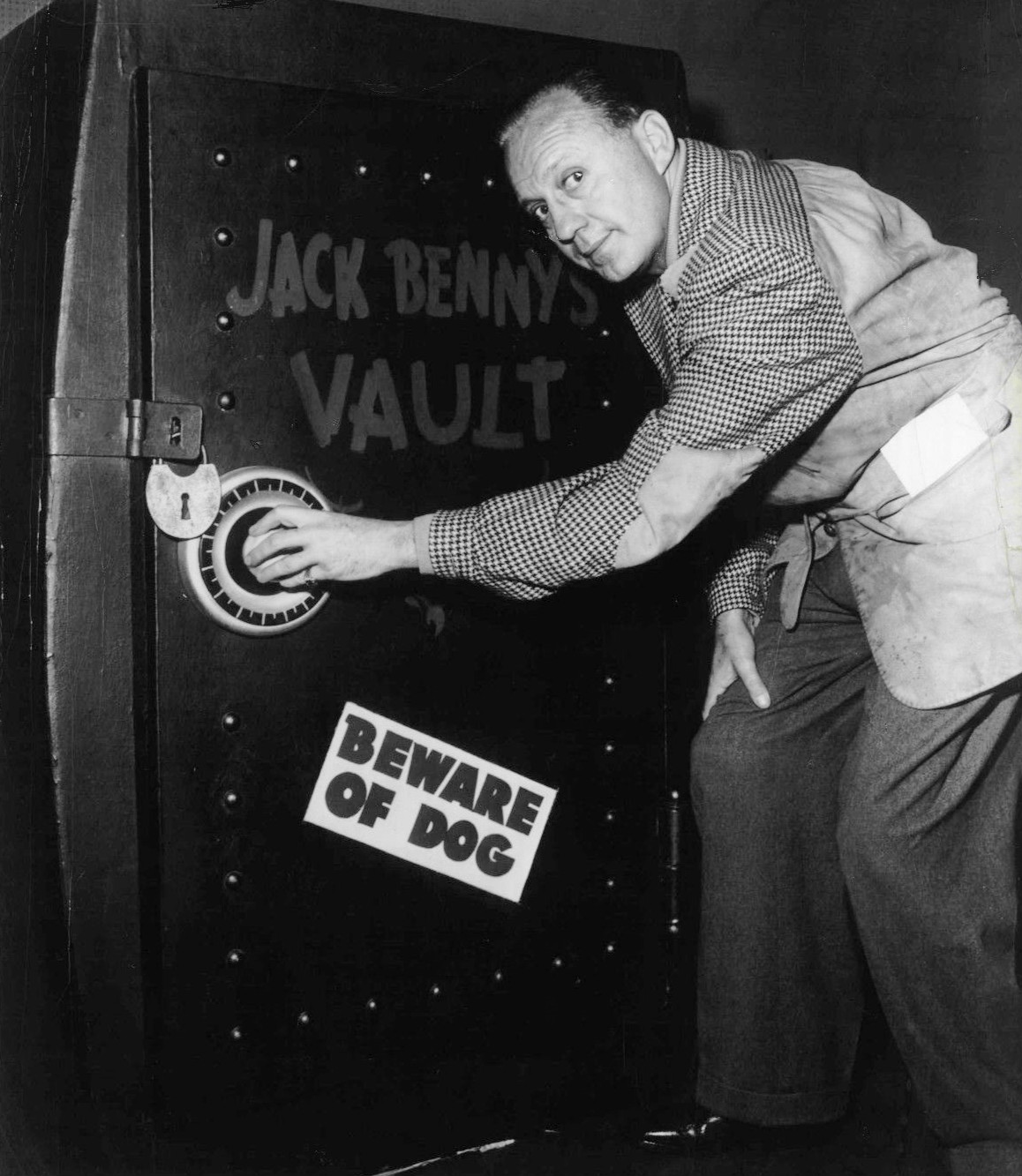
A promotional photo of Benny and his vault

Benny even had a sound-based running gag of his own: his famous basement vault alarm, allegedly installed by Spike Jones, ringing off with a shattering cacophony of whistles, sirens, bells, and blasts before ending invariably with the sound of a foghorn. The alarm rang even when Benny opened his safe with the correct combination. The vault also featured a guard named Ed (voiced by Joseph Kearns) who had been on post down below, apparently, before the end of the American Civil War, the end of the American Revolutionary War, the founding of Los Angeles, on Jack's 38th birthday and even the beginning of humanity.

In one appearance, Ed asked Benny, "By the way, Mr. Benny ... what's it like on the outside?" Benny responded, "... winter is nearly here, and the leaves are falling." Ed responded, "Hey, that must be exciting," to which Benny replied (in a stunningly risqué joke for the period), "Oh, no – people are wearing clothes now."

In one episode of the Benny radio show, Ed the Guard actually agreed when Benny invited him to take a break and come back to the surface world, only to discover that modern conveniences and transportation, which had not been around the last time he had been to the surface, terrorized and confused him. (Ed thought a crosstown bus was "a red and yellow dragon".) Finally, Ed decides to return to his post fathoms below and stay there. The basement vault gag was also used in the cartoon The Mouse that Jack Built and an episode of The Lucy Show.

A separate sound gag involved a song Benny had written, "When You Say I Beg Your Pardon, Then I'll Come Back to You". Its inane lyrics and insipid melody guaranteed that it would never be published or recorded, but Benny continued to try to con, extort, or otherwise inveigle some of his musical guests (including The Smothers Brothers and Peter, Paul and Mary) to perform it. However, none ever made it all the way.

In keeping with his "stingy" schtick, on one of his television specials he remarked that, to his way of looking at things, a "special" is when the price of coffee is marked down.

==== The orchestra ====
Another popular running gag concerned the social habits of Benny's on-air orchestra, who were consistently portrayed as a bunch of drunken ne'er-do-wells. Led first by Phil Harris and later by Bob Crosby, the orchestra, and in particular band member Frank Remley, were jokingly portrayed as often being too drunk to play properly, using an overturned bass drum to play cards on just minutes before a show and so enamored of liquor that the sight of a glass of milk would make them sick. Remley was portrayed in various unflattering situations, such as being thrown into a garbage can by a road sweeper who had found him passed out in the street at 4 am, and on a wanted poster at the Beverly Hills police station.

Crosby also got consistent laughs by frequently joking about his more famous brother Bing Crosby's vast wealth.

==== Christmas shopping ====
One popular scenario that became a tradition on The Jack Benny Program was the annual "Christmas Shopping" episode, in which Benny would go to a local department store to do his shopping. Each year, Benny would buy a ridiculously cheap Christmas gift for Don Wilson, from a harried store clerk played by Mel Blanc. Benny would then drive Blanc to insanity by exchanging the gift countless times throughout the episode.

In the 1946 Christmas episode, for example, Benny buys shoelaces for Don, and is unable to make up his mind whether to give Wilson shoelaces with plastic tips or metal tips. After exchanging them repeatedly, Mel Blanc is heard screaming insanely, "Plastic tips! Metal tips! I can't stand it anymore!"

A variation in 1957 was with an expensive wallet, but repeatedly changing the greeting card, prompting Blanc to shout, "I haven't run into anyone like you in 20 years! Oh, why did the governor have to give me that pardon!?" Benny then realizes that he should have gotten Don a wallet for $1.98, whereupon the store clerk responds by committing suicide. This edition was later remade for television in 1960.

Over the years, in the Christmas episodes, Benny bought and repeatedly exchanged cuff links, golf tees, a box of dates, a paint set (water colors or oils), and a gopher trap. In later years, Benny would encounter Mel Blanc's wife (played by Jean Vander Pyl or Bea Benaderet) or the clerk's psychiatrist at the store, and drive them crazy, as well.

One Christmas program had Crosby agonizing over what to get Remley: Benny: "Well, why don't you get him a cordial; like a bottle of Drambuie?" Crosby: "That's a nice thought, Jack, but Drambuie's an after-dinner drink." Benny: "So?" Crosby: "So Remley never quite makes it 'til after dinner."

==== The Maxwell ====
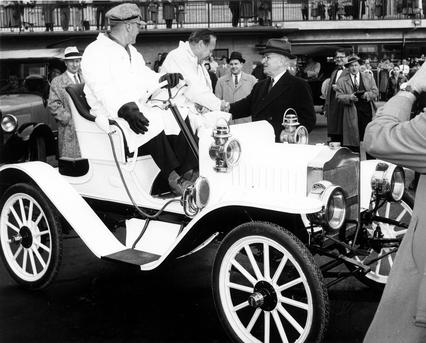
Jack Benny shakes hands with Harry S. Truman from the seat of a circa 1908 Maxwell Roadster

Starting with the October 24, 1937, radio show, when Jack proudly announced the purchase of his car, a running joke began that Benny drove an old Maxwell automobile, a brand that went out of business in 1925. Although some details such as the car's body style and its exact model year varied over the years, what remained constant was that Benny's old car was so worn out that it would barely run, but the miserly Benny insisted he could get a few more miles out of it.

Many of the sound effects for the car's clattering engine came from an actual old motor that the sound-effects shop had salvaged from a Los Angeles junkyard. When a sound-effects man missed a cue for the automobile engine, Mel Blanc quickly improvised a vocal imitation of a sputtering car engine starting up noisily that was so funny, it became a regular feature of the show.

The ongoing saga of the Maxwell was initially interrupted after just five years, when on the October 18, 1942, broadcast, Jack took his car to a local junkyard and contributed it to the World War II junk salvage drive, receiving $7.50 in war stamps in exchange. However, much of the radio audience may have remained unaware that the Maxwell was ever gone, because before long Benny was heard traveling around in a decrepit old car again, and by the end of the 1940s, his car was once more specifically identified as a Maxwell.

When the Jack Benny Program premiered on television in 1950, a 1916 Maxwell Model 25 Tourer became one of the production's standard props. Benny's Maxwell later became a 1923 Tourer. Benny often made public appearances in Maxwells. He drove a Maxwell onto the stage in one of his last television specials.

By 1941, Jack Benny's Maxwell had become such a well-known aspect of popular culture that it was referenced in the Billy Mills song "I'm in Love with the Sound Effects Man" as heard on the June 17, 1941, Fibber McGee and Molly radio show and later performed on a 1943 recording by Spike Jones. The automobile was also featured in the 1943 Benny film The Meanest Man in the World. Benny and his archaic auto were featured in a series of television and print ads for Texaco from the 1950s through the 1970s.

A series of gags was built around the premise that Benny appreciated the value of Sky Chief brand gasoline in keeping his car running smoothly, but was too cheap to buy more than one gallon at a time. In the classic cartoon "The Mouse that Jack Built", Benny and his wife are driven by Rochester in a sputtering Maxwell car. In another gag Benny comes home and Rochester reports that he has just reported to the Police that the Maxwell was stolen 3 hours after it happened. When Benny asks why he waited so long, Rochester replies that it was when he stopped laughing.

Many people believe that Benny appears behind the wheel of his Maxwell in the 1963 film It's a Mad, Mad, Mad, Mad World, but in fact, it was a 1932 Cadillac. The long shots for the scene were shot months before Benny was cast – with a stunt driver at the wheel – and the role was intended for Stan Laurel (which is why the character wears a derby, which Benny almost never did). When Laurel ultimately passed on appearing, Jack agreed to play the role. According to the commentary on the Criterion edition of the film, his close-ups were filmed on a rear-projection stage at the Paramount studio.

==== The Benny–Allen feud ====
On April 5, 1936, Benny began his famous radio feud with rival Fred Allen when he satirized Allen's show.Allen kicked the feud off on his own show on December 30, 1936, after child violinist Stuart Canin gave a performance of François Schubert's The Bee credibly enough that Allen wisecracked about "a certain alleged violinist" who should by comparison be ashamed of himself. Benny, who listened to the Allen show, answered in kind at the end of his January 3, 1937, show, and the two comedians were off and running.

For a decade, the two went at it back and forth, so convincingly that fans of either show could have been forgiven for believing they had become blood enemies. In reality, the two men were close friends and mutual admirers. Benny and Allen often appeared on each other's show during the ongoing feud; numerous surviving episodes of both comedians' radio shows feature each other, in both acknowledged guest spots and occasional cameos. On one Christmas program, Allen thanked Benny for sending him a Christmas tree, but then added that the tree had died. "Well, what do you expect," quipped Allen, "when the tree is in Brooklyn and the sap is in Hollywood."

Benny in his memoir (Sunday Nights at Seven) and Allen in his Treadmill to Oblivion later revealed that each comedian's writing staff often met together to plot future takes on the mock feud. If Allen zapped Benny with a satirization of Benny's show ("The Pinch Penny Program"), Benny shot back with a parody of Allen's Town Hall Tonight called "Clown Hall Tonight", and their playful sniping ("Benny was born ignorant, and he's been losing ground ever since") was also advanced in the films Love Thy Neighbor and It's in the Bag!.

Perhaps the climax of the feud came during Fred Allen's parody of popular quiz-and-prize show Queen for a Day. Calling the sketch "King for a Day", Allen played the host and Benny a contestant who sneaked onto the show using the alias Myron Proudfoot. Benny answered the prize-winning question correctly and Allen crowned him "king" and showered him with a passel of almost meaningless prizes.

Allen proudly announced, "Tomorrow night, in your ermine robe, you will be whisked by bicycle to Orange, New Jersey, where you will be the judge in a chicken-cleaning contest," to which Benny joyously declared, "I'm king for a day!" At this point a professional pressing-iron was wheeled on stage, to press Benny's suit properly. It didn't matter that Benny was still in the suit. Allen instructed his aides to remove Benny's suit, one item at a time, ending with his trousers, each garment's removal provoking louder laughter from the studio audience.

As his trousers began to come off, Benny howled, "Allen, you haven't seen the end of me!" At once Allen shot back, "It won't be long now!" The laughter was so loud and chaotic at the chain of events that the Allen show announcer, Kenny Delmar, was cut off the air while trying to read a final commercial and the show's credits. (Allen was notorious for running overtime often enough, largely thanks to his ad-libbing talent, and he overran the clock again this time.)

Benny was profoundly shaken when in 1956 Allen suddenly died at age 61 from a heart attack. In a statement released on the day after Allen's death, Benny said, "People have often asked me if Fred Allen and I were really friends in real life. My answer is always the same: You couldn't have such a long-running and successful feud as we did, without having a deep and sincere friendship at the heart of it." Allen himself wrote, "For years people have been asking me if Jack and I are friendly. I don't think that Jack Benny has an enemy in the world. ... He is my favorite comedian and I hope to be his friend until he is forty. That will be forever."

=== Preservation ===
The radio series was one of the most extensively preserved programs of its era, with the archive almost complete from 1936 onward and several episodes existing from before that (including the 1932 premiere).

A few episodes from the series' later years remain missing, however, such as the shows from September 30 and October 7, 1951.

The March 28, 1948 episode of the radio series was chosen by the Library of Congress as a 2004 selection for preservation in the National Recording Registry.

== Television ==
The Jack Benny Program
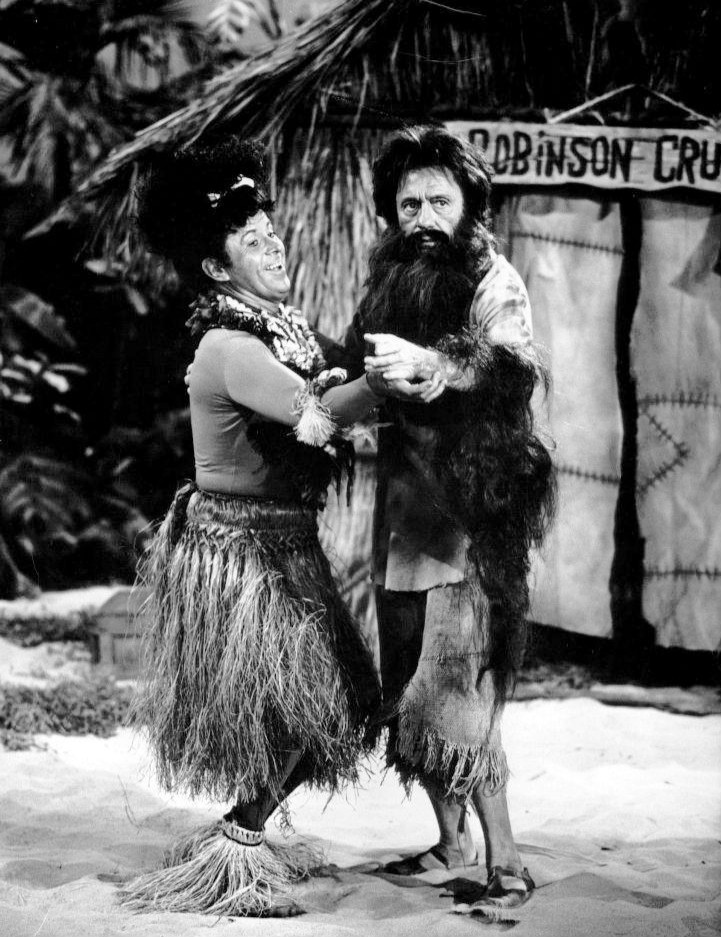
- Jack Benny as Robinson Crusoe with Dennis Day as his man Friday, 1963
- Starring: Jack Benny
- Composer: Mahlon Merrick
- No. of seasons: 15
- No. of episodes: 261 (list of episodes)

Production
- Running time: 24–25 minutes
- Production companies: CBS Television (1950–1955); J&M Productions, Inc. (1955–1965)

Original release
- Network: CBS (1950–1964); NBC (1964–1965)
- Release: October 28, 1950 – April 16, 1965

Jack Benny made his TV debut in 1949 with a local appearance on Los Angeles station KTTV, then a CBS affiliate. On October 28, 1950, he made his full network debut over CBS Television.

The regular and continuing Jack Benny Program was telecast on CBS from October 28, 1950, to September 15, 1964. Benny's television shows were occasional broadcasts in his early seasons on TV, as he was still firmly dedicated to radio. It became a bi-weekly show in the 1954–55 season, then a weekly show in the 1960–1961 season, and moved to NBC for its final season, airing from September 25, 1964, to September 10, 1965.

343 episodes were produced. His TV sponsors included American Tobacco's Lucky Strike (1950–59), Lever Brothers' Lux (1959–60), State Farm Insurance (1960–65), Lipton Tea (1960–62), General Foods' Jell-O (1962–64), and Miles Laboratories (1964–65).

The television show was a seamless continuation of Benny's radio program, employing many of the same players, the same approach to situation comedy, and some of the same scripts. The suffix "Program" instead of "Show" was also a carryover from radio, where "program" rather than "show" was used frequently for presentations in the nonvisual medium. Occasionally, in several live episodes, the title card read The Jack Benny Show.

The Jack Benny Program appeared infrequently during its first two years on CBS-TV. Benny moved into television slowly. In his first season (1950–1951), he only performed on four shows, but by the 1951–1952 season, he was ready to do one show roughly every six weeks. In the third season (1952–1953), the show was broadcast every four weeks. During the 1953–1954 season, the Jack Benny Program aired every three weeks.

From 1954 to 1960, the program aired every other week, rotating with such shows as Private Secretary and Bachelor Father. After the radio show ended in 1955, Benny took on another biweekly series, becoming a regular on Shower of Stars, CBS's hourlong comedy/variety anthology series. He effectively appeared almost every week on one of the two series. On Shower of Stars, Benny's character finally turned 40, throwing a large birthday party for the occasion.

Beginning in the 1960–1961 season, the Jack Benny Program began airing every week. The show moved from CBS to NBC prior to the 1964–65 season. During the 1953–54 season, a few episodes were filmed during the summer and the others were live, a schedule that allowed Benny to continue doing his radio show. In the 1953–1954 season, Dennis Day had his own short-lived comedy and variety show on NBC, The Dennis Day Show, which was a continuation of his early stint on The RCA Victor Show, on which he had begun appearing on an alternate-week basis beginning in early 1952.

Live episodes (and later live-on-tape episodes) of the Jack Benny Program were broadcast from CBS Television City with live audiences. Early filmed episodes were shot by McCadden Productions at Hollywood Center Studios and later by Desilu Productions at Red Studios Hollywood with an audience brought in to watch the finished film for live responses. Benny's opening and closing monologues were filmed in front of a live audience. From the late 1950s until the last season on NBC, though, a laugh track was used to augment audience responses. By this time, all shows were filmed at Universal Television.

In Jim Bishop's book A Day in the Life of President Kennedy, John F. Kennedy said that he was too busy to watch most television, but that he made the time to watch the Jack Benny Program each week.

Outside of North America (being also one of the most popular shows on the CBC), one episode reportedly aired first in the United Kingdom (where one episode was filmed). Benny had also been a familiar figure in Australia since the mid- to late 1930s with his radio show, and he made a special program for ATN-7 Jack Benny In Australia in March 1964, after a successful tour of Sydney and Melbourne.

=== End ===
James T. Aubrey, the president of CBS Television and a man known for his abrasive and judgmental decision-making style, infamously told Benny in 1963, "you're through." Benny was further incensed when CBS placed an untested new sitcom, the Beverly Hillbillies spinoff Petticoat Junction, as his lead in. Benny had had a strong ratings surge the previous year when his series was moved to Tuesday nights with the popular Red Skelton Hour in the time slot prior to his.

He feared a separation of their two programs might prove fatal. Early that fall, he announced his show was moving back to NBC, where he was able to get the network to pick up another season. Benny's fears proved to be unfounded; his ratings for the 1963–64 season remained strong, while Petticoat Junction emerged as the most popular new series that fall.

In his unpublished autobiography, I Always Had Shoes (portions of which were later incorporated by Benny's daughter, Joan, into her memoir of her parents, Sunday Nights at Seven), Benny said that he made the decision to end his TV series in 1965. He said that while the ratings were still good (he cited a figure of some 18 million viewers per week, although he qualified that figure by saying he never believed the ratings services were doing anything more than guessing), advertisers complained that commercial time on his show was costing nearly twice as much as what they paid for most other shows, and he had grown tired of what was called the "rate race".

=== Syndication ===
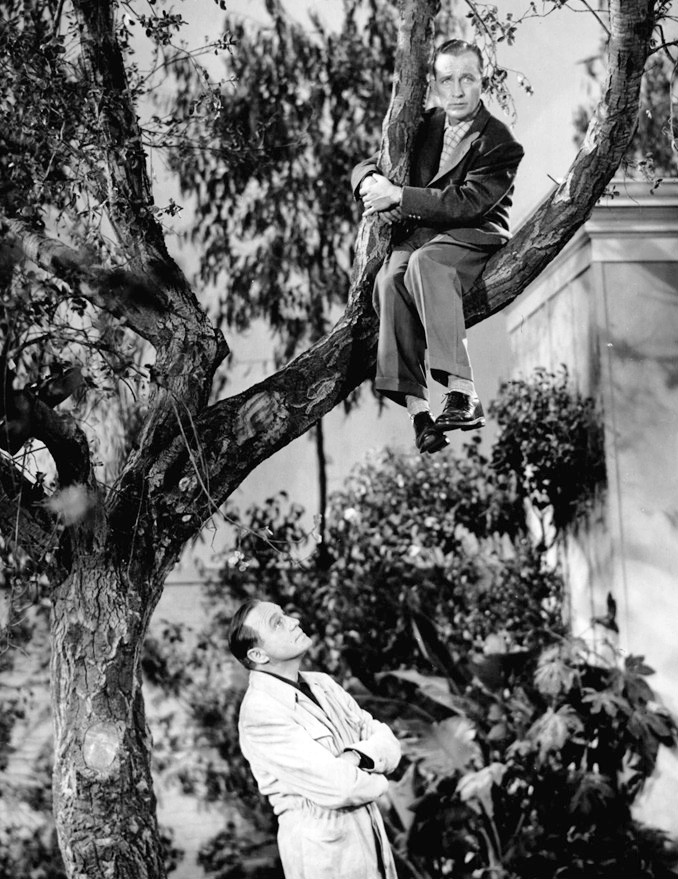
While Benny has Bing Crosby up a tree, thanks to Rochester's hammock invention, he uses the opportunity to bargain with Bing for a lower appearance fee, 1954.

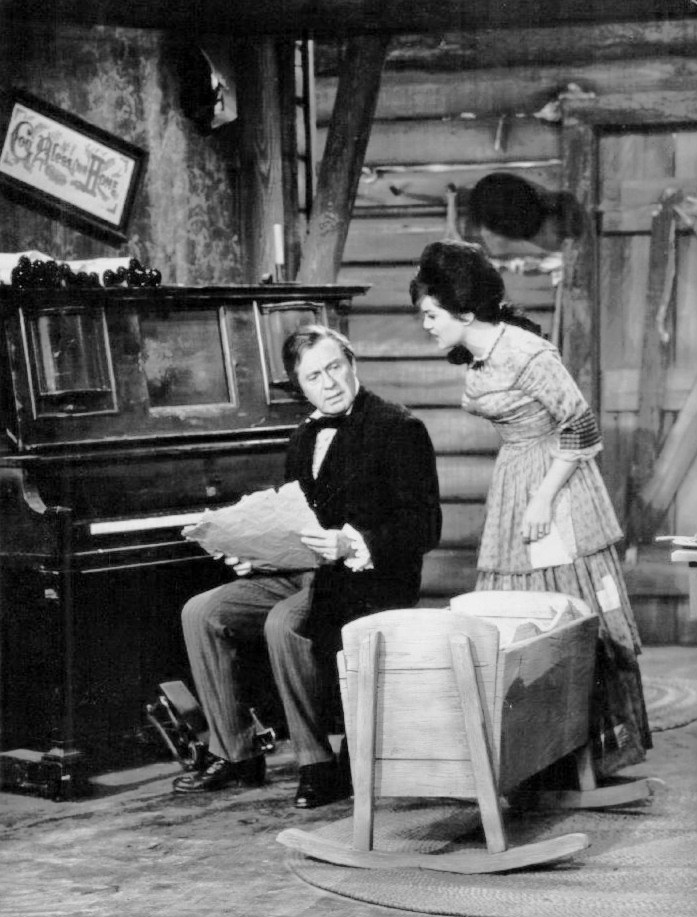
Benny as composer Stephen Foster and Connie Francis as his wife who nags him to write a successful song, 1963.

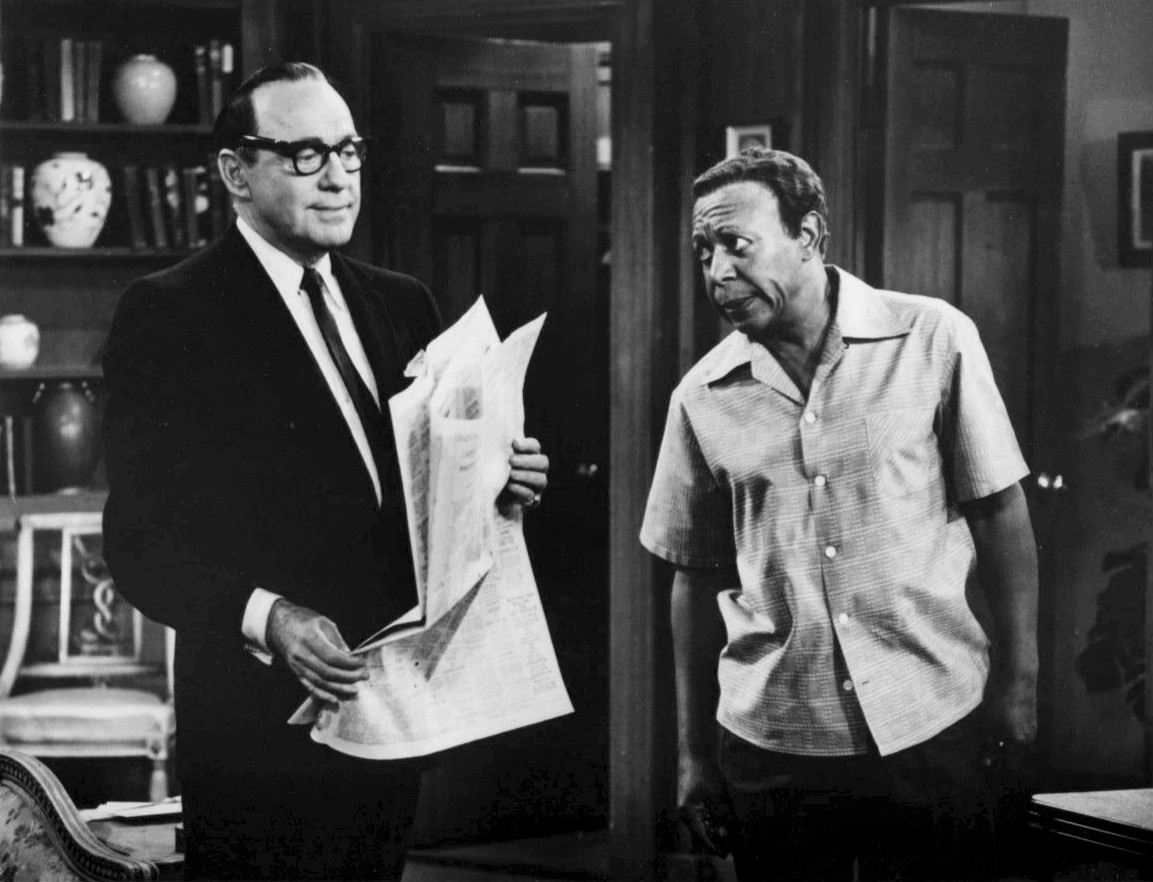
Jack Benny and Eddie Anderson as Rochester from a 1977 special about Jack Benny's series; it used clips from earlier shows.

As with the radio shows, most of the television series has lapsed into the public domain, although several episodes (particularly those made from 1961 onward, including the entire NBC-TV run) remain under copyright. During his lone NBC season, CBS aired repeats on weekdays and Sunday afternoons. 104 episodes personally selected by Benny and Irving Fein, Benny's associate since 1947, were placed into syndication in 1968 by MCA TV. Telecasts of the shows in the late evening were running as late as 1966.

Four early-1960s episodes were rerun on CBS during the summer of 1977. Edited 16mm prints ran on the CBN Cable Network in the mid-1980s. Restored versions first appeared on the short lived HA! network in 1990. From 2011 to 2025, the series has run on Antenna TV, part of a long-term official syndication distribution deal. The public domain television episodes have appeared on numerous stations, including PBS, while the radio series episodes have appeared in radio drama anthology series such as When Radio Was.

=== Home media ===
Public-domain episodes have been available on budget VHS/Beta tapes (and later DVDs) since the late 1970s. MCA Home Video issued a 1960 version of the classic "Christmas Shopping" show in 1982 and a VHS set of 10 filmed episodes in 1990. In 2008, 25 public-domain episodes of the show, long thought lost, were located in a CBS vault. The Jack Benny Fan Club, with the blessing of the Benny estate, offered to fund the digital preservation and release of these sealed episodes. CBS issued a press statement that any release was unlikely.

June 2013 had the first official release of 18 rare live Benny programs from 1956 to 1964 by Shout! Factory. This set, part of Benny's private collection at the UCLA film and television library, included guest shots by Jack Paar, John Wayne, Tony Curtis, Gary Cooper, Dick Van Dyke, Rock Hudson, Natalie Wood, and President Harry Truman, and the only TV appearance with longtime radio foe Ronald Colman.

=== Television episodes ===
Season	Episodes	Originally released			Rank	Rating
Season	Episodes	First released	Last released	Network	Rank	Rating
1	4	October 10, 1950	May 5, 1951	CBS	—N/a	—N/a
2	6	November 11, 1951	June 6, 1952	CBS	9	42.8
3	8	October 10, 1952	May 5, 1953	CBS	12	39.0
4	13	September 9, 1953	May 5, 1954	CBS	16	33.3
5	16	October 10, 1954	May 5, 1955	CBS	7	38.3
6	16	September 9, 1955	April 4, 1956	CBS	5	37.2
7	16	September 9, 1956	April 4, 1957	CBS	10	32.3
8	16	September 9, 1957	April 4, 1958	CBS	28	27.1
9	15	September 9, 1958	April 4, 1959	CBS	—N/a	—N/a
10	15	October 10, 1959	May 5, 1960	CBS	—N/a	—N/a
11	26	October 10, 1960	April 4, 1961	CBS	10	26.2
12	26	October 10, 1961	April 4, 1962	CBS	—N/a	—N/a
13	27	September 9, 1962	April 4, 1963	CBS	11	26.2 (Note: Tied with Dr. Kildare)
14	28	September 9, 1963	April 4, 1964	CBS	12	25.0 (Note: Tied with I've Got a Secret and Lassie)
15	28	September 9, 1964	April 4, 1965	NBC	—N/a	—N/a

== Cast and characters ==
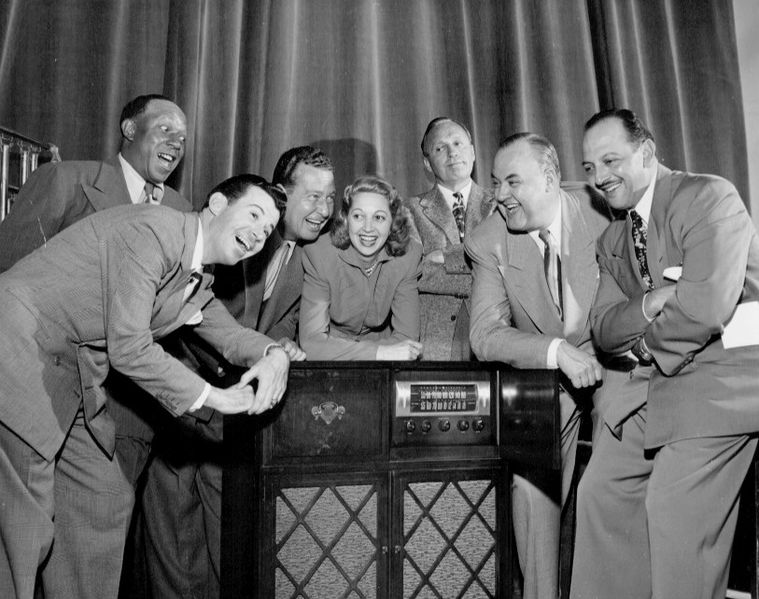
Group photograph of Eddie Anderson, Dennis Day, Phil Harris, Mary Livingstone, Jack Benny, Don Wilson, and Mel Blanc

=== Main cast ===
- Jack Benny as himself – The protagonist of the show, Benny is a comic, vain, penny-pinching miser, insisting on remaining 39 years old on stage despite his actual age, and often playing the violin badly.
- Eddie Anderson as Rochester Van Jones, Jack's valet and chauffeur – Early in the show's run, he often talked of gambling or going out with women. Later on, he complained about his salary.
- Don Wilson as himself – Don generally opened the show and also did the commercials. He was the target of Jack's jokes, mostly about his weight.
- Eugene McNulty as Dennis Day – A vocalist perpetually in his 20s (by the time of the last television series, McNulty was 49 years old), he was sweet but not very bright. When called upon, he could use a wide variety of accents, which was especially useful in plays. He usually sang a song about 10 minutes into the program. If the episode was a flashback to a previous time, a ruse would be used such as Dennis singing his song for Jack so he could hear it before the show. McNulty adopted the name "Dennis Day" as his stage name for the rest of his career.
- Sadie Marks as Mary Livingstone – A sarcastic comic foil, her varying roles all served as, to use the description of Fred Allen, "a girl to insult (Jack)." Marks, who in real life was Benny's wife, later legally changed her name to "Mary Livingstone" in response to the character's popularity. Her role on the program was reduced in the 1950s due to increasing stage fright, and Livingstone finally retired from acting in 1958.
- Phil Harris as himself – A skirt-chasing, arrogant, hip-talking bandleader, he constantly put Jack down (in a mostly friendly way). He referred to Mary as "Livvy" or "Liv", and Jack as "Jackson". Harris explained this once by saying it's "as close as I can get to jackass and still be polite" Spun off into The Phil Harris–Alice Faye Show (1946–1954) with his wife, actress Alice Faye. Harris left the radio show in 1952 and his character did not make the transition to television apart from a guest appearance.
- Mel Blanc performed multiple voice roles: Carmichael the Polar Bear, Professor Pierre LeBlanc, Sy the Mexican, Polly (Jack's parrot; originally Purv Pullen), and Jack's perpetually sputtering Maxwell car (originally performed by Pinto Colvig), which Blanc reprised in the animated cartoon The Mouse that Jack Built. An occasional running joke involved commentary about how various characters that Blanc portrayed all looked alike. He was also the sound effects of Jack's barely functional Maxwell automobile – a role he inherited from Colvig and played again in the Warner Bros. cartoon Blanc also played a train-station announcer, whose catchphrase was, "Train leaving on Track Five for Anaheim, Azusa, and Cuc-amonga." Blanc and Bert Gordon both portrayed a range of voices as needed.
- Frank Nelson as the "Yeeee-essss?" man – He was always the person who waited on Jack wherever he was, from the railroad-station agent, to the store clerk, to the doorman, to the waiter. When Jack asked if he was what he was working as, Frank would respond with a sarcastic quip (In one episode, he had played a floorwalker, and when Jack asked if he was the floorwalker, Frank responded with "Well, what do you think I am with this carnation? A float in the rose parade?") Frank always delighted in aggravating Jack, as he was apparently constantly aggravated by Jack's presence.
- Sheldon Leonard – A racetrack tout (originated by Benny Rubin), he frequently offered unsolicited advice to Benny on a variety of racing-unrelated subjects. Ironically, he never gave out information on horse racing, unless Jack demanded it. One excuse the tout gave was, "Who knows about horses?" His catchphrase was "Hey, bud... c'mere a minute".
- Joseph Kearns as Ed, the superannuated security guard in Jack's money vault – Ed had allegedly been guarding Jack's vault since (variously) the founding of Los Angeles (1781), the American Civil War, the American Revolutionary War, or when Jack had just turned 38 years old. Burt Mustin took over the role on television following Kearns' death in 1962. (In the 1959 cartoon The Mouse that Jack Built, Mel Blanc played the part of Ed, who asks if the U.S. had won the war, then asks what would be done with the Kaiser). Kearns also played other roles, that of Dennis Day's father, that of a beleaguered IRS agent, his dentist, and often of a clerk when it was not necessary to have Frank Nelson antagonize Jack.
- Artie Auerbach as Mr. Kitzel – He originally appeared on Al Pearce's radio show in the late 1930s, where his famous catch phrase was, "Hmmmm... eh, could be!", and several years later as a regular on The Abbott & Costello Show, who originally started out as a Yiddish hot dog vendor selling hot dogs during the Rose Bowl. In later episodes, he went on to lose his hot dog stand, and move on to various other jobs. A big part of his schtick involved garbling names with his accent, such as referring to Nat King Cole as "Nat King Cohen", or mentioning his favorite baseball player, "Rabbi Maranville". He often complained about his wife, an unseen character who was described as a large, domineering woman who, on one occasion, Kitzel visualized as "...from the front, she looks like Don Wilson from the side!" He often sang various permutations of his jingle, "Pickle in the middle and the mustard on top!" Kitzel was often heard to say, "Hoo-hoo-HOO!" in response to questions asked of him.
- Bob Crosby – In 1952, Crosby replaced Phil Harris as the bandleader, remaining until Benny retired the radio show in 1955. In joining the show, he became the leader of the same group of musicians who had played under Harris. Many of his running jokes focused on his apparent inability to pronounce "Manischewitz", his own family, and the wealth and lifestyle of his older brother, Bing Crosby.
- Benny Rubin – Played a variety of characters on both the radio and television versions. His most memorable bit was as an information-desk attendant. Jack would ask a series of questions that Rubin would answer with an ever-increasingly irritated, "I don't know!" followed by the punchline {among them: "Well, if you don't know, why are you standing behind that counter?"/"I gotta stand behind something; somebody stole my pants!" or "I missed a payment, and they nailed my shoes to the floor!"}.
- Dale White – Harlow Wilson, the son of Don and Lois Wilson, on television. His catchphrase, "You never did like me!", is usually uttered when Jack and he end up embroiled in an argument, though he once said it to his own mother.
- Verna Felton as Mrs. Lucretia Day, Dennis' frighteningly domineering mother – She often came to near blows with Jack in her efforts to prevent him from taking advantage of Dennis, and she was often portrayed as working various masculine jobs such as a plumber, trucker, or karate instructor. Although she cares deeply for her son, Dennis' zany behavior aggravates her to no end, and the show has alluded to her hilariously myriad attempts at killing and abandoning him.
- Bea Benaderet and Sara Berner as Gertrude Gearshift and Mabel Flapsaddle, a pair of telephone switchboard operators – They always traded barbs with Jack (and sometimes each other) when he tried to put through a call. Whenever the scene shifted to them, they subtly plugged a current picture in an insult such as "Mr. Benny's line is flashing!" "Oh, I wonder what Dial M for Money wants now?" or "I wonder what Schmoe Vadis wants now?"
- Jane Morgan and Gloria Gordon as Martha and Emily – A pair of elderly ladies, they were irresistibly attracted to Jack.
- Madge Blake and Jesslyn Fax, as television counterparts to Martha and Emily, were the president and vice president, respectively, of the Jack Benny Fan Club, Pasadena chapter.
- Butterfly McQueen played Butterfly, the niece of Rochester. She worked as Mary Livingstone's maid.

=== Other cast members include ===
- Ronald Colman and his wife, Benita as themselves – They were among Benny's most popular guest stars on the radio series, portraying his long-suffering next-door neighbors. On the show, the Colmans were often revolted by Jack's eccentricities and by the fact that he always borrowed odds and ends from them (at one point, leading Ronald to exclaim, "Butter? Butter, butter!!! Where does he think this is, Shangri-La?"). Dennis Day often impersonated Ronald Colman.
- James Stewart and his wife, Gloria as themselves – Recurring guest stars on the television series, they played Benny's often-imposed-upon neighbors, in roles similar to those performed by Ronald and Benita Colman.
- Frank Parker was the show's singer during the early seasons on radio from New York.
- Kenny Baker – The show's tenor singer during the second half of the 1930s, he originally played the young, dopey character. He left and was replaced by Dennis Day in a similar role.
- Andy Devine – Jack's raspy-voiced friend, he lived on a farm with his ma and pa. He usually told a story about his folks and life around the farm. His catchphrase was "Hiya, Buck!"

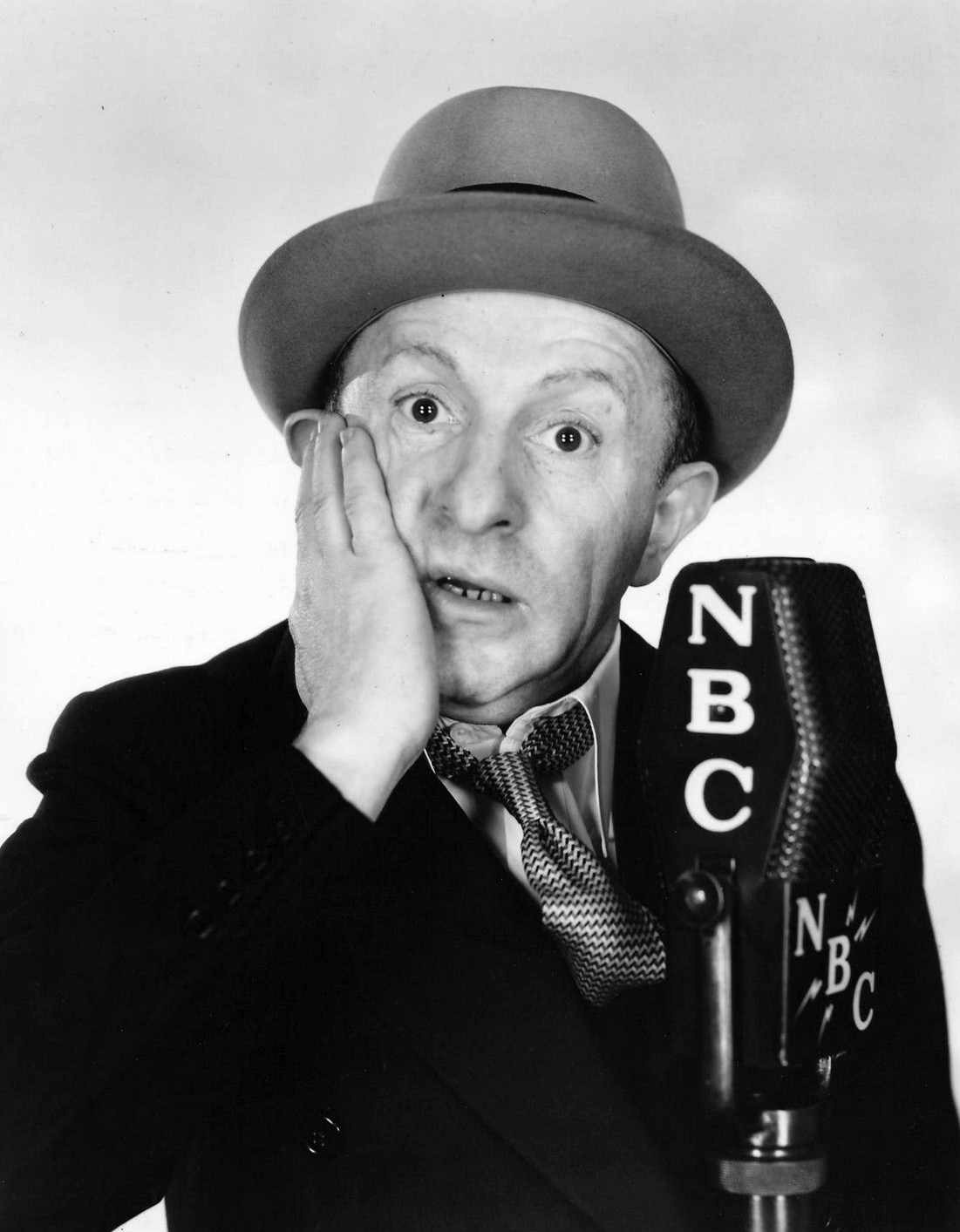
Sam Hearn as Schlepperman in 1935

- Sam Hearn as Schlepperman – A Jewish character, he spoke with a Yiddish accent (his catch phrase: "Hullo, Stranger!"). He would return again as the "Hiya, Rube!" guy, a hick farmer from the town of Calabasas, who always insisted on referring to Jack as "rube".
- Ed Beloin as Mr. Billingsley – He was Benny's polite but eccentric boarder. He appeared in the early 1940s.
- Larry Stevens – A tenor singer, he substituted for Dennis Day from November 1944 to March 1946, when Dennis served in the Navy.
- Mary Kelly as the Blue Fairy – A clumsy, overweight fairy, she appeared in several storytelling episodes. Kelly had been an old flame of Jack's, who had fallen on hard times. Benny was unsure of whether to give Kelly a regular role and instead appealed to friend George Burns, who put her on his show in 1939 as Mary "Bubbles" Kelly, best friend to Gracie.
- Gisele MacKenzie – A singer and violin player, she guest-starred seven times on the program.
- Blanche Stewart contributed a variety of characters and animal sounds.
- Barry Gordon played Jack Benny as a child in a skit where Jack played his own father.
- Johnny Green was the band leader until 1936, when Phil Harris joined the show.
- Harry Baldwin – Jack Benny's secretary, who also played "The Knocking Man," a character who would knock on the door, enter, say something ridiculous, then leave. He also played a variety of other roles.

== See also ==
- Jack Benny and the Golden Age of American Radio Comedy
