= John Tackaberry =

American screenwriter

John Tackaberry (October 9, 1912 – June 24, 1969) was an Australian-born American radio and television writer for The Jack Benny Show, as well as other shows.

== Early years ==
He was born in Adelaide, Australia and grew up in Oodnadatta, a small railroad stop in the Simpson Desert in the Australian State of South Australia. His father, Arthur Lee Tackaberry, a graduate of Tulane University School of Medicine in New Orleans, Louisiana, was, by birth, an East Texan and his mother, Myrtle Amelia Tackaberry (née Stace) was born and raised in Palmerston North, New Zealand. His father was the doctor for the Ghan Railroad which, at the time, ran from Adelaide to Alice Springs, Australia. In 1920 he moved with his parents and sister to Houston, Texas USA, his father's birth state. He grew to manhood in Houston and was briefly a student at the University of Texas School of Law. However, due to the financial considerations of The Great Depression, he dropped out of school and went to work in the Texas oil fields.

== Writing career ==
About 1943 he was in Los Angeles writing briefly for Horace Heidt, Jack Carson and eventually landed a plum job with the Jack Benny radio show which, at the time, was the number one show on the air. He wrote for Benny from about 1944 until 1961. In 1946 he wrote the lyrics for a song called Pickle In The Middle With The Mustard On Top. This song was written as part of a comedy routine on the Benny show. However, it became number one in the country for two weeks. He is also credited on the TV series Shower of Stars (1954) and Ford Star Jubilee (1955). After leaving Benny's show, Tackaberry later wrote for The Joey Bishop Show.

== Personal life ==
John Tackaberry died at St. Joseph's Hospital in Burbank, California and is buried at Forest Lawn Cemetery in Glendale, California. He was married twice. The first time for seventeen years to Ellen Terry Tackaberry (née Newman) (deceased 1997) and the second time to Elizabeth Tackaberry (deceased 2004). He is the father of two children, Stace Tackaberry (1942–2017) and Terry Louise Tackaberry Norton (1943–2008).
