= List of American films of 1934 =

American films released in 1934

More than 480 American feature films were released in 1934.

It Happened One Night won Best Picture at the 7th Academy Awards on February 27, 1935.

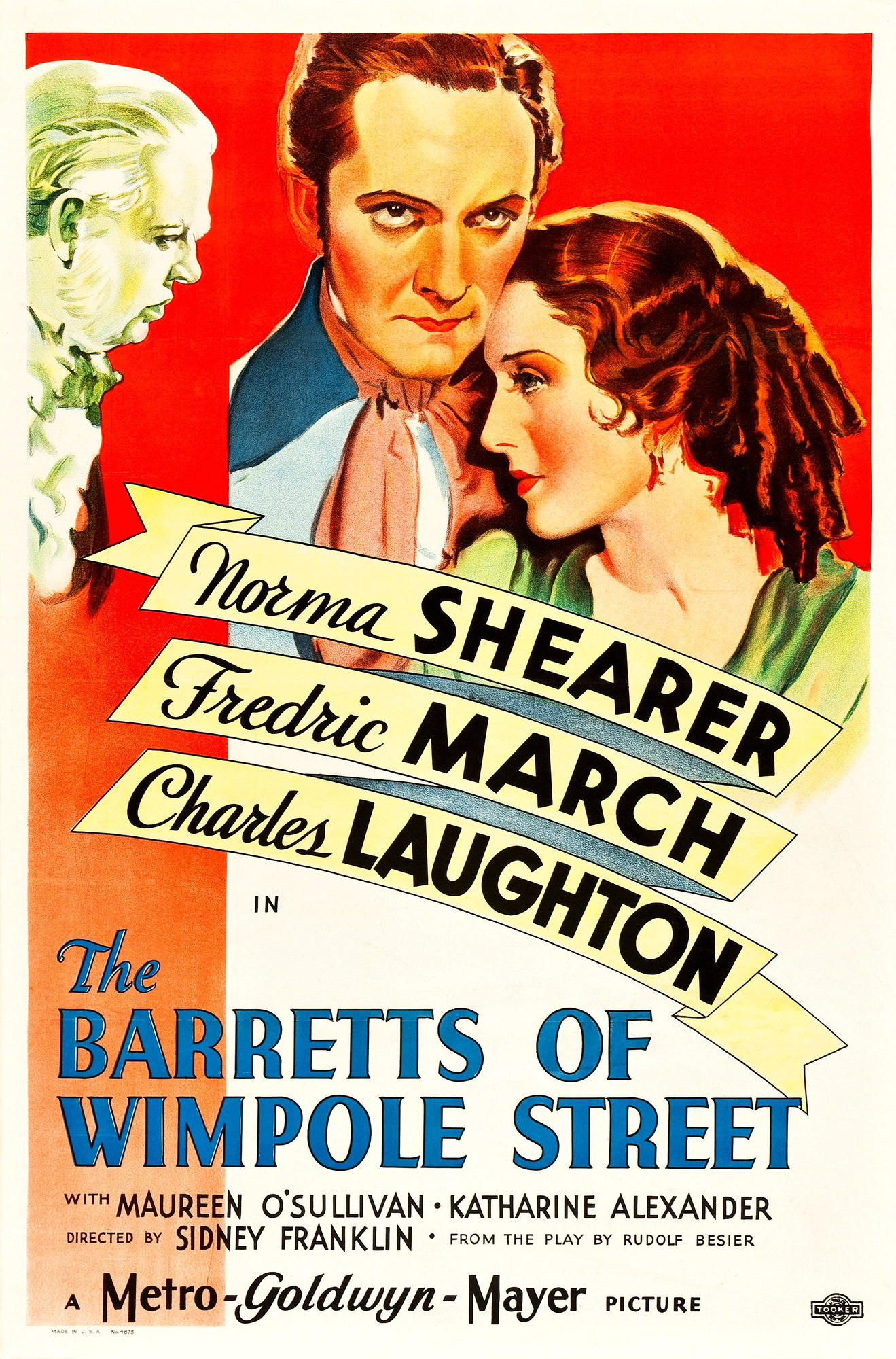
The Barretts of Wimpole Street starring Norma Shearer and Fredric March.

== A-B ==
Title	Director	Cast	Genre	Notes
365 Nights in Hollywood	George Marshall	Alice Faye, Grant Mitchell, James Dunn	Musical	Fox Film
6 Day Bike Rider	Lloyd Bacon	Joe E. Brown, Maxine Doyle, Frank McHugh	Comedy	Warner Bros.
Adventures of Texas Jack	Victor Adamson	Hal Taliaferro, Jay Wilsey, Victoria Vinton	Western	Independent
The Affairs of Cellini	Gregory La Cava	Constance Bennett, Fredric March, Fay Wray	Historical comedy	United Artists
Affairs of a Gentleman	Edwin L. Marin	Paul Lukas, Leila Hyams, Patricia Ellis	Drama	Universal
Against the Law	Lambert Hillyer	Johnny Mack Brown, Sally Blane, Arthur Hohl	Crime	Columbia
The Age of Innocence	Philip Moeller	Irene Dunne, John Boles, Helen Westley	Drama	RKO
All Men Are Enemies	George Fitzmaurice	Helen Twelvetrees, Mona Barrie, Hugh Williams	Drama	Fox Film
All of Me	James Flood	Fredric March, George Raft, Miriam Hopkins	Comedy, Drama	Paramount
Among the Missing	Albert S. Rogell	Richard Cromwell, Billie Seward, Henrietta Crosman	Drama	Columbia
Anne of Green Gables	George Nichols Jr.	Anne Shirley, Helen Westley, O. P. Heggie	Comedy, Drama	RKO
Are We Civilized?	Edwin Carewe	Frank McGlynn, William Farnum, Anita Louise	Drama	Independent
As Husbands Go	Hamilton MacFadden	Warner Baxter, Helen Vinson, Warner Oland	Comedy	Fox Film
As the Earth Turns	Alfred E. Green	Donald Woods, Jean Muir, Dorothy Peterson	Drama	Warner Bros.
Babbitt	William Keighley	Aline MacMahon, Guy Kibbee, Claire Dodd	Drama	Warner Bros.
Babes in Toyland	Gus Meins	Stan Laurel, Oliver Hardy, Charlotte Henry	Comedy, Fantasy	MGM
Baby Take a Bow	Harry Lachman	Shirley Temple, Claire Trevor, James Dunn	Comedy, Drama	Fox Film
Bachelor Bait	George Stevens	Stuart Erwin, Rochelle Hudson, Grady Sutton	Comedy	RKO
Bachelor of Arts	Louis King	Anita Louise, Mae Marsh, Tom Brown	Drama	Fox Film
Badge of Honor	Spencer Gordon Bennet	Buster Crabbe, Ruth Hall, Betty Blythe	Drama	Mayfair
The Band Plays On	Russell Mack	Robert Young, Stuart Erwin, Betty Furness	Drama	MGM
The Barrets of Wimpole Street	Sidney Franklin	Norma Shearer, Fredric March, Charles Laughton	Historical	MGM
Bedside	Robert Florey	Warren William, Jean Muir, Allen Jenkins	Drama	Warner Bros.
Beggars in Ermine	Phil Rosen	Lionel Atwill, Jameson Thomas, Betty Furness	Drama	Monogram
Beggar's Holiday	Sam Newfield	Sally O'Neil, Hardie Albright, J. Farrell MacDonald	Drama	Independent
Behold My Wife!	Mitchell Leisen	Sylvia Sidney, Ann Sheridan, H. B. Warner	Comedy, Drama	Paramount
Belle of the Nineties	Leo McCarey	Mae West, Johnny Mack Brown, Katherine DeMille	Comedy, Western	Paramount
Beloved	Victor Schertzinger	John Boles, Gloria Stuart, Morgan Farley	Drama, Musical	Universal
Beyond the Law	D. Ross Lederman	Tim McCoy, Shirley Grey, Addison Richards	Crime	Columbia
The Big Shakedown	John Francis Dillon	Bette Davis, Ricardo Cortez, Allen Jenkins	Drama, Crime	Warner Bros.
The Black Cat	Edgar G. Ulmer	Boris Karloff, Bela Lugosi, David Manners	Crime, Horror	Universal
Black Moon	Roy William Neill	Fay Wray, Dorothy Burgess, Jack Holt	Horror	Columbia
Blind Date	Roy Mack	Ann Sothern, Neil Hamilton, Paul Kelly	Comedy, Romance	Columbia
Blue Steel	Robert N. Bradbury	John Wayne, Eleanor Hunt, George "Gabby" Hayes	Western	Monogram
Bolero	Mitchell Leisen, Wesley Ruggles	George Raft, Carole Lombard, Sally Rand	Drama	Paramount
Bombay Mail	Edwin L. Marin	Edmund Lowe, Ralph Forbes, Shirley Grey	Thriller	Universal
The Border Menace	Jack Nelson	Bill Cody, George Chesebro, Ben Corbett	Western	Independent
Border Guns	Robert J. Horner	Bill Cody, Blanche Mehaffey, William Desmond	Western	Independent
Born to be Bad	Lowell Sherman	Loretta Young, Cary Grant, Marion Burns	Drama	United Artists
Boss Cowboy	Victor Adamson	Buddy Roosevelt, Frances Morris, Fay McKenzie	Western	Independent
Bottoms Up	David Butler	Spencer Tracy, John Boles, Pat Paterson	Drama, Musical	Fox Film
Bright Eyes	David Butler	Shirley Temple, James Dunn, Lois Wilson	Comedy, Musical	Fox Film
British Agent	Michael Curtiz	Leslie Howard, Kay Francis, Cesar Romero	Spy drama	Warner Bros.
Broadway Bill	Frank Capra	Myrna Loy, Warner Baxter, Walter Connolly	Comedy, Drama	Columbia
Bulldog Drummond Strikes Back	Roy Del Ruth	Ronald Colman, Loretta Young, Charles Butterworth	Comedy, Mystery	United Artists
By Your Leave	Lloyd Corrigan	Frank Morgan, Genevieve Tobin, Neil Hamilton	Comedy, Drama	RKO

== C-D ==
Title	Director	Cast	Genre	Notes
Call It Luck	James Tinling	Pat Paterson, Herbert Mundin, Charles Starrett	Comedy	Fox Film
The Captain Hates the Sea	Lewis Milestone	Victor McLaglen, Alison Skipworth, John Gilbert	Comedy	Columbia
Caravan	Erik Charell	Charles Boyer, Loretta Young, Jean Parker	Drama, Musical	Fox Film
Carolina	Henry King	Janet Gaynor, Lionel Barrymore, Henrietta Crosman	Comedy, Drama	Fox Film
The Case of the Howling Dog	Alan Crosland	Warren William, Mary Astor, Allen Jenkins	Mystery	Warner Bros.
The Cat and the Fiddle	William K. Howard	Ramon Novarro, Jeanette MacDonald, Frank Morgan	Musical	MGM
The Cat's-Paw	Sam Taylor	Harold Lloyd, Una Merkel, Grace Bradley	Comedy	Fox Film
Chained	Clarence Brown	Joan Crawford, Clark Gable, Otto Kruger	Drama	MGM
Change of Heart	John G. Blystone	Janet Gaynor, James Dunn, Ginger Rogers	Drama, Romance	Fox Film
Charlie Chan in London	Eugene Forde	Warner Oland, Mona Barrie, Ray Milland	Mystery	Fox Film
Charlie Chan's Courage	Eugene Forde	Warner Oland, Drue Leyton, Donald Woods	Mystery	Fox Film
Cheaters	Phil Rosen	William Boyd, June Collyer, Dorothy Mackaill	Drama	Liberty
Cheating Cheaters	Richard Thorpe	Fay Wray, Cesar Romero, Minna Gombell	Comedy	Universal
The Circus Clown	Ray Enright	Joe E. Brown, Patricia Ellis, Dorothy Burgess	Comedy	Warner Bros.
City Limits	William Nigh	Frank Craven, Sally Blane, Claude Gillingwater	Comedy, Drama	Monogram
City Park	Richard Thorpe	Sally Blane, Matty Kemp, Henry B. Walthall	Comedy drama	Chesterfield
Cleopatra	Cecil B. DeMille	Claudette Colbert, Warren William, Henry Wilcoxon	Drama	Paramount
Cockeyed Cavaliers	Mark Sandrich	Bert Wheeler, Robert Woolsey, Thelma Todd	Comedy	RKO
College Rhythm	Norman Taurog	Jack Oakie, Joe Penner, Helen Mack	Comedy	Paramount
Come On Marines!	Henry Hathaway	Richard Arlen, Ida Lupino, Grace Bradley	Drama	Paramount
Coming Out Party	John G. Blystone	Frances Dee, Gene Raymond, Nigel Bruce	Comedy	Fox Film
The Count of Monte Cristo	Rowland V. Lee	Robert Donat, Elissa Landi, Louis Calhern	Drama, Adventure	United Artists
The Countess of Monte Cristo	Karl Freund	Fay Wray, Paul Lukas, Reginald Owen	Comedy	Universal
The Crime Doctor	John S. Robertson	Otto Kruger, Karen Morley, Nils Asther	Crime	RKO
The Crime of Helen Stanley	D. Ross Lederman	Ralph Bellamy, Shirley Grey, Gail Patrick	Crime	Columbia
Crime Without Passion	Ben Hecht	Claude Rains, Margo, Whitney Bourne	Drama	Paramount
Crimson Romance	David Howard	Ben Lyon, Sari Maritza, Erich von Stroheim	Drama	Mascot
The Crosby Case	Edwin L. Marin	Wynne Gibson, Onslow Stevens, Alan Dinehart	Crime	Universal
Cross Country Cruise	Edward Buzzell	Lew Ayres, June Knight, Alice White	Romance	Universal
Cross Streets	Frank R. Strayer	Claire Windsor, Johnny Mack Brown	Drama	Chesterfield
The Curtain Falls	Charles Lamont	Dorothy Lee, Holmes Herbert, Henrietta Crosman	Mystery	Chesterfield
Dames	Busby Berkeley	Joan Blondell, Dick Powell, Ruby Keeler	Comedy, Musical	Warner Bros.
Dancing Man	Albert Ray	Reginald Denny, Judith Allen, Natalie Moorhead	Mystery	Independent
Dangerous Corner	Phil Rosen	Virginia Bruce, Conrad Nagel, Melvyn Douglas	Mystery	RKO
Dark Hazard	Alfred E. Green	Edward G. Robinson, Genevieve Tobin, Robert Barrat	Drama	Warner Bros.
David Harum	James Cruze	Will Rogers, Louise Dresser, Evelyn Venable	Comedy	Fox Film
Death on the Diamond	Edward Sedgwick	Robert Young, Madge Evans, Nat Pendleton	Mystery	MGM
Death Takes a Holiday	Mitchell Leisen	Fredric March, Helen Westley, Kent Taylor	Drama	Paramount
The Defense Rests	Lambert Hillyer	Jack Holt, Jean Arthur, Nat Pendleton	Drama	Columbia
Devil Tiger	Clyde E. Elliott	Marion Burns, Kane Richmond, Harry Woods	Action	Fox Film
Double Door	Charles Vidor	Evelyn Venable, Anne Revere, Kent Taylor	Horror	Paramount
The Dover Road	J. Walter Ruben	Diana Wynyard, Clive Brook, Billie Burke	Comedy	RKO
Down to Their Last Yacht	Paul Sloane	Mary Boland, Polly Moran, Ned Sparks	Comedy, Musical	RKO
The Dragon Murder Case	H. Bruce Humberstone	Warren William, Margaret Lindsay, Lyle Talbot	Mystery	Warner Bros.
Dr. Monica	William Keighley	Kay Francis, Warren William, Jean Muir	Drama	Warner Bros.
The Dude Ranger	Edward F. Cline	George O'Brien, Irene Hervey, LeRoy Mason	Western	Fox Film

== E-F ==
Title	Director	Cast	Genre	Notes
Easy to Love	William Keighley	Genevieve Tobin, Adolphe Menjou, Mary Astor	Comedy	Warner Bros.
Eight Girls in a Boat	Richard Wallace	Dorothy Wilson, Douglass Montgomery, Kay Johnson	Drama	Paramount
Elinor Norton	Hamilton MacFadden	Claire Trevor, Gilbert Roland, Hugh Williams	Drama	Fox Film
Elmer and Elsie	Gilbert Pratt	George Bancroft, Frances Fuller, Roscoe Karns	Comedy	Paramount
Embarrassing Moments	Edward Laemmle	Chester Morris, Marian Nixon, Alan Mowbray	Comedy	Universal
Enlighten Thy Daughter	John Varley	Herbert Rawlinson, Charles Eaton, Claire Whitney	Drama	Independent
Evelyn Prentice	William K. Howard	William Powell, Myrna Loy, Rosalind Russell	Drama	MGM
Ever Since Eve	George Marshall	George O'Brien, Mary Brian, Herbert Mundin	Drama	Fox Film
Fashions of 1934	William Rees	William Powell, Bette Davis, Frank McHugh	Comedy, Musical	Warner Bros.
Father Brown, Detective	Edward Sedgwick	Walter Connolly, Paul Lukas, Gertrude Michael	Mystery	Paramount
Ferocious Pal	Spencer Gordon Bennet	Tom London, Henry Roquemore, Harry Dunkinson	Western	Independent
Fifteen Wives	Frank R. Strayer	Conway Tearle, Natalie Moorhead, Raymond Hatton	Mystery	Chesterfield
Fighting Hero	Harry S. Webb	Tom Tyler, Dick Botiller, Edward Hearn	Western	Independent
The Fighting Ranger	George B. Seitz	Buck Jones, Dorothy Revier, Bradley Page	Western	Columbia
Fighting to Live	Edward F. Cline	Marion Shilling, Steve Pendleton, Lafayette Russell	Western	Principle Pictures
Fighting Through	Harry L. Fraser	Reb Russell, Lucille Lund, Edward Hearn	Western	Independent
Finishing School	Wanda Tuchock	Frances Dee, Ginger Rogers, Bruce Cabot	Drama, Romance	RKO
Flirtation	Leo Birinsky	Jeanette Loff, Ben Alexander, Arthur Tracy	Drama	Independent
Flirtation Walk	Frank Borzage	Dick Powell, Ruby Keeler, Ross Alexander	Musical, Romance	Warner Bros.
Flirting with Danger	Vin Moore	William Cagney, Maria Alba, Edgar Kennedy	Comedy	Monogram
Fog Over Frisco	William Dieterle	Bette Davis, Donald Woods, Margaret Lindsay	Drama, Mystery	Warner Bros.
Forsaking All Others	W. S. Van Dyke	Joan Crawford, Clark Gable, Robert Montgomery	Romance	MGM
The Fountain	John Cromwell	Ann Harding, Jean Hersholt, Brian Aherne	Romance	RKO
Four Frightened People	Cecil B. DeMille	Claudette Colbert, Mary Boland, Herbert Marshall	Comedy	Paramount
Friends of Mr. Sweeney	Edward Ludwig	Charles Ruggles, Ann Dvorak, Eugene Pallette	Comedy, Drama	Warner Bros.
Frontier Days	Robert F. Hill	Bill Cody, Ada Ince, Wheeler Oakman	Western	Independent
Frontier Marshal	Lewis Seiler	George O'Brien, Irene Bentley, Ruth Gillette	Western	Fox Film
Fugitive Lady	Albert S. Rogell	Florence Rice, Neil Hamilton, Donald Cook	Drama	Columbia
Fugitive Lovers	Richard Boleslavsky	Madge Evans, Robert Montgomery, Nat Pendleton	Comedy	MGM
Fugitive Road	Frank R. Strayer	Erich von Stroheim, Wera Engels, Leslie Fenton	Drama	Chesterfield

== G-H ==
Title	Director	Cast	Genre	Notes
Gallant Lady	Gregory La Cava	Ann Harding, Clive Brook, Otto Kruger	Drama	United Artists
Gambling	Rowland V. Lee	George M. Cohan, Wynne Gibson, Dorothy Burgess	Crime	Fox Film
Gambling Lady	Archie Mayo	Barbara Stanwyck, Pat O'Brien, Joel McCrea	Drama	Warner Bros.
The Gay Bride	Jack Conway	Carole Lombard, Chester Morris, Zazu Pitts	Crime	MGM
The Gay Divorcee	Mark Sandrich	Fred Astaire, Ginger Rogers, Alice Brady	Musical	RKO
Gentlemen Are Born	Alfred E. Green	Franchot Tone, Jean Muir, Ann Dvorak	Drama	Warner Bros.
George White's Scandals	George White	Rudy Vallée, Alice Faye, Jimmy Durante	Musical	Fox Film
The Ghost Walks	Frank R. Strayer	June Collyer, John Miljan, Henry Kolker	Mystery, Horror	Chesterfield
Gift of Gab	Karl Freund	Edmund Lowe, Gloria Stuart, Ruth Etting	Comedy, Musical	Universal
The Girl from Missouri	Jack Conway	Jean Harlow, Lionel Barrymore, Franchot Tone	Comedy	MGM
Girl in Danger	D. Ross Lederman	Ralph Bellamy, Shirley Grey, Arthur Hohl	Crime	Columbia
A Girl of the Limberlost	Christy Cabanne	Louise Dresser, Marian Marsh, Ralph Morgan	Drama	Monogram
Girl o' My Dreams	Ray McCarey	Mary Carlisle, Sterling Holloway, Arthur Lake	Comedy	Monogram
Glamour	William Wyler	Paul Lukas, Constance Cummings, Phillip Reed	Drama	Universal
Good Dame	Marion Gering	Sylvia Sidney, Fredric March, Jack La Rue	Drama	Paramount
Grand Canary	Irving Cummings	Warner Baxter, Madge Evans, Zita Johann	Drama	Fox Film
Great Expectations	Stuart Walker	Phillips Holmes, Jane Wyatt, Florence Reed	Drama	Universal
The Great Flirtation	Ralph Murphy	Elissa Landi, Adolphe Menjou, David Manners	Drama	Paramount
Green Eyes	Richard Thorpe	Shirley Grey, Charles Starrett, John Wray	Mystery	Chesterfield
Gridiron Flash	Glenn Tryon	Eddie Quillan, Betty Furness, Grant Mitchell	Sports	RKO
Half a Sinner	Kurt Neumann	Sally Blane, Joel McCrea, Berton Churchill	Drama	Universal
Handy Andy	David Butler	Will Rogers, Mary Carlisle, Robert Taylor	Comedy	Fox Film
Happiness Ahead	Mervyn LeRoy	Dick Powell, Josephine Hutchinson, Allen Jenkins	Comedy, Musical	Warner Bros.
Happy Landing	Robert N. Bradbury	Julie Bishop, William Farnum, Ray Walker	Action	Monogram
Harlem After Midnight	Oscar Micheaux	Rex Ingram, Lawrence Chenault, Lorenzo Tucker	Drama	Micheaux Pictures
Hat, Coat, and Glove	Worthington Miner	Ricardo Cortez, Dorothy Burgess, John Beal	Crime	RKO
Have a Heart	David Butler	Jean Parker, James Dunn, Stuart Erwin	Drama, Romance	MGM
He Was Her Man	Lloyd Bacon	James Cagney, Joan Blondell, Victor Jory	Drama	Warner Bros.
Heat Lightning	Mervyn LeRoy	Aline MacMahon, Ann Dvorak, Preston Foster	Drama	Warner Bros.
Hell Bent for Love	D. Ross Lederman	Tim McCoy, Lilian Bond, Bradley Page	Crime	Columbia
The Hell Cat	Albert Rogell	Robert Armstrong, Ann Sothern, Minna Gombell	Drama	Columbia
Hell in the Heavens	John G. Blystone	Warner Baxter, Conchita Montenegro, Herbert Mundin	Drama	Fox Film
Helldorado	James Cruze	Richard Arlen, Madge Evans, Ralph Bellamy	Drama	Fox Film
Here Comes the Groom	Edward Sedgwick	Mary Boland, Neil Hamilton, Patricia Ellis	Comedy	Paramount
Here Comes the Navy	Lloyd Bacon, Earl Baldwin	James Cagney, Pat O'Brien, Gloria Stuart	Comedy, Romance	Warner Bros.
Here is My Heart	Frank Tuttle	Bing Crosby, Kitty Carlisle, Roland Young	Musical, Comedy	Paramount
Hi Nellie!	Mervyn LeRoy	Paul Muni, Glenda Farrell, Ned Sparks	Crime drama	Warner Bros.
Hide-Out	W. S. Van Dyke	Maureen O'Sullivan, Robert Montgomery, Edward Arnold	Comedy, Drama	MGM
High School Girl	Crane Wilbur	Helen MacKellar, Mahlon Hamilton, Cecilia Parker	Drama	Independent
Hips, Hips, Hooray!	Mark Sandrich	Bert Wheeler, Robert Woolsey, Thelma Todd	Comedy	RKO
Hired Wife	George Melford	Greta Nissen, Weldon Heyburn, James Kirkwood	Drama	Independent
His Greatest Gamble	John S. Robertson	Richard Dix, Dorothy Wilson, Bruce Cabot	Drama	RKO
Hold That Girl	Hamilton MacFadden	James Dunn, Claire Trevor, Gertrude Michael	Comedy	Fox Film
Hollywood Mystery	B. Reeves Eason	June Clyde, Frank Albertson, José Crespo	Mystery	Independent
Hollywood Party	Roy Rowland, Sam Wood	Jimmy Durante, Stan Laurel, Oliver Hardy	Comedy, Musical	MGM
House of Danger	Charles Hutchison	Onslow Stevens, Janet Chandler, James Bush	Thriller	Independent
House of Mystery	William Nigh	Clay Clement, Joyzelle Joyner, Gabby Hayes	Mystery, Horror	Monogram
The House of Rothschild	Alfred L. Werker	George Arliss, Boris Karloff, Loretta Young	Biography	United Artists
Housewife	Alfred E. Green	Bette Davis, George Brent, Ann Dvorak	Drama	Warner Bros.
The Human Side	Edward Buzzell	Adolphe Menjou, Doris Kenyon, Reginald Owen	Drama	Universal

== I-J ==
Title	Director	Cast	Genre	Notes
I Am a Thief	Robert Florey	Mary Astor, Ricardo Cortez, Dudley Digges	Drama, Crime	Warner Bros.
I Believed in You	Irving Cummings	Rosemary Ames, John Boles, Gertrude Michael	Drama	Fox Film
I Give My Love	Karl Freund	Paul Lukas, Wynne Gibson, Anita Louise	Drama	Universal
I Like It That Way	Harry Lachman	Gloria Stuart, Marian Marsh, Roger Pryor	Musical	Universal
I Sell Anything	Robert Florey	Pat O'Brien, Ann Dvorak, Claire Dodd	Comedy	Warner Bros.
I'll Fix It	Roy William Neill	Jack Holt, Mona Barrie, Winnie Lightner	Comedy	Columbia
I'll Tell the World	Edward Sedgwick	Lee Tracy, Gloria Stuart, Roger Pryor	Comedy	Universal
I've Got Your Number	Ray Enright	Joan Blondell, Pat O'Brien, Glenda Farrell	Comedy, Romance	Warner Bros.
Imitation of Life	John M. Stahl	Claudette Colbert, Fredi Washington, Louise Beavers	Drama	Universal
In Love with Life	Frank R. Strayer	Lila Lee, Dickie Moore, Onslow Stevens	Sports	Chesterfield
In Old Santa Fe	David Howard	Ken Maynard, Evalyn Knapp, Kenneth Thomson	Western	Mascot
Inside Information	Robert F. Hill	Rex Lease, Marion Shilling, Philo McCullough	Action	Independent
It Happened One Night	Frank Capra	Claudette Colbert, Clark Gable, Roscoe Karns	Comedy, Romance	Columbia
It's a Gift	Norman Z. McLeod	W. C. Fields, Kathleen Howard, Jean Rouverol	Comedy	Paramount
Jane Eyre	Christy Cabanne	Virginia Bruce, Colin Clive, David Torrence	Drama	Monogram
Jealousy	Roy William Neill	Nancy Carroll, George Murphy, Donald Cook	Drama	Columbia
Jimmy the Gent	Michael Curtiz	James Cagney, Bette Davis, Allen Jenkins	Comedy, Drama	Warner Bros.
Journal of a Crime	F. McGrew Willis	Ruth Chatterton, Adolphe Menjou, Claire Dodd	Drama	Warner Bros.
Judge Priest	John Ford	Will Rogers, Tom Brown, Anita Louise	Comedy	Fox Film

== K-L ==
Title	Director	Cast	Genre	Notes
Kansas City Princess	William Rees	Joan Blondell, Glenda Farrell, Robert Armstrong	Comedy, Romance	Warner Bros.
Keep 'Em Rolling	George Archainbaud	Walter Huston, Frank Conroy, G. Pat Collins	Drama, War	RKO
Kentucky Kernels	George Stevens	Bert Wheeler, Robert Woolsey, Mary Carlisle	Comedy	RKO
The Key	Michael Curtiz	William Powell, Edna Best, Colin Clive	Drama	Warner Bros.
Kid Millions	Roy Del Ruth	Eddie Cantor, Ann Sothern, Ethel Merman	Comedy, Musical	United Artists
King Kelly of the U.S.A.	Leonard Fields	Edgar Kennedy, Irene Ware, Franklin Pangborn	Comedy	Monogram
Kiss and Make-Up	Harlan Thompson	Cary Grant, Genevieve Tobin, Edward Everett Horton	Comedy	Paramount
Ladies Should Listen	Frank Tuttle	Cary Grant, Frances Drake, Edward Everett Horton	Comedy	Paramount
Lady by Choice	David Burton	Carole Lombard, May Robson, Walter Connolly	Comedy, Drama	Columbia
The Last Gentleman	Sidney Lanfield	George Arliss, Edna May Oliver, Charlotte Henry	Comedy	United Artists
The Last Round-Up	Henry Hathaway	Randolph Scott, Monte Blue, Barton MacLane	Western	Paramount
Laughing Boy	Hunt Stromberg	Lupe Vélez, Ramon Novarro, William B. Davidson	Drama	MGM
The Lawless Frontier	Robert N. Bradbury	John Wayne, Sheila Terry, George "Gabby" Hayes	Western	Monogram
Lazy River	George B. Seitz	Jean Parker Robert Young, Nat Pendleton	Drama	MGM
The Lemon Drop Kid	Marshall Neilan	Lee Tracy, Helen Mack, Minna Gombell	Comedy	Paramount
Let's Be Ritzy	Edward Ludwig	Lew Ayres, Patricia Ellis, Isabel Jewell	Comedy	Universal
Let's Talk It Over	Kurt Neumann	Chester Morris, Mae Clarke, Irene Ware	Comedy	Universal
Let's Try Again	Worthington Miner	Clive Brook, Diana Wynyard, Helen Vinson	Drama	RKO
The Life of Vergie Winters	Alfred Santell	Ann Harding, John Boles, Helen Vinson	Drama	RKO
Lighting Bill	Victor Adamson	Jay Wilsey, Alma Rayford, Nelson McDowell	Western	Independent
Lightning Strikes Twice	Ben Holmes	Ben Lyon, Thelma Todd, Pert Kelton	Comedy	RKO
Limehouse Blues	Alexander Hall	George Raft, Jean Parker, Anna May Wong	Drama, Crime	Paramount
The Line-Up	Howard Higgin	William Gargan, Marian Nixon, John Miljan	Drama, Crime	Columbia
Little Man, What Now?	Frank Borzage	Margaret Sullavan, Douglass Montgomery, Alan Hale	Drama	Universal
Little Men	Phil Rosen	Ralph Morgan, Erin O'Brien-Moore, Phyllis Fraser	Drama	Mascot
The Little Minister	Richard Wallace	Katharine Hepburn, John Beal, Alan Hale	Drama	RKO
Little Miss Marker	Alexander Hall	Adolphe Menjou, Shirley Temple, Charles Bickford	Comedy, Drama	Paramount
Long Lost Father	Ernest B. Schoedsack	John Barrymore, Helen Chandler, Donald Cook	Drama	RKO
Looking for Trouble	William A. Wellman	Spencer Tracy, Constance Cummings, Jack Oakie	Drama, Crime	United Artists
Lost in the Stratosphere	Melville W. Brown	William Cagney, June Collyer, Edward Nugent	Drama	Monogram
A Lost Lady	Alfred E. Green	Barbara Stanwyck, Frank Morgan, Ricardo Cortez	Drama	Warner Bros.
The Lost Patrol	John Ford	Victor McLaglen, Wallace Ford, Boris Karloff	War	RKO
Love Birds	William A. Seiter	Slim Summerville, ZaSu Pitts, Mickey Rooney	Comedy	Universal
The Love Captive	Max Marcin	Gloria Stuart, Nils Asther, Renee Gadd	Drama	Universal
Love Past Thirty	Vin Moore	Aileen Pringle, Theodore von Eltz, Phyllis Barry	Comedy	Independent
Love Time	James Tinling	Pat Paterson, Nils Asther, Herbert Mundin	Historical romance	Fox Film
The Lucky Texan	Robert N. Bradbury	John Wayne, Barbara Sheldon, George "Gabby" Hayes	Western	Monogram

== M-N ==
Title	Director	Cast	Genre	Notes
Madame DuBarry	William Dieterle	Dolores del Río, Victor Jory, Osgood Perkins	Comedy, Drama	Warner Bros.
Madame Spy	Karl Freund	Fay Wray, Nils Asther, Edward Arnold	Adventure	Universal
The Man from Hell	Lewis D. Collins	Reb Russell, Fred Kohler, George "Gabby" Hayes	Western	Independent
The Man from Utah	Robert N. Bradbury	John Wayne, Polly Ann Young, George "Gabby" Hayes	Western	Monogram
Man of Two Worlds	J. Walter Ruben	Elissa Landi, Francis Lederer, Henry Stephenson	Drama	RKO
The Man Trailer	Lambert Hillyer	Buck Jones, Cecilia Parker, Clarence Geldart	Western	Columbia
The Man Who Reclaimed His Head	Edward Ludwig	Claude Rains, Joan Bennett, Lionel Atwill	Drama	Universal
The Man with Two Faces	Archie Mayo	Edward G. Robinson, Mary Astor, Ricardo Cortez	Drama, Crime	Warner Bros.
A Man's Game	D. Ross Lederman	Tim McCoy, Evalyn Knapp, Ward Bond	Action	Columbia
Mandalay	Michael Curtiz	Kay Francis, Ricardo Cortez, Warner Oland	Drama	Warner Bros.
Manhattan Love Song	Leonard Fields	Robert Armstrong, Dixie Lee, Franklin Pangborn	Comedy romance	Monogram
Manhattan Melodrama	George Cukor	Clark Gable, William Powell, Myrna Loy	Drama, Romance	MGM
Many Happy Returns	Norman Z. McLeod	Gracie Allen, George Burns, George Barbier	Comedy	Paramount
Marie Galante	Henry King	Spencer Tracy, Ketti Gallian, Ned Sparks	Drama, Romance	Fox Film
The Marines Are Coming	David Howard	William Haines, Conrad Nagel, Esther Ralston	Drama	Mascot
Marrying Widows	Sam Newfield	Judith Allen, Johnny Mack Brown, Minna Gombell	Drama	Independent
Massacre	Alan Crosland	Richard Barthelmess, Ann Dvorak, Claire Dodd	Drama	Warner Bros.
The Meanest Gal in Town	Russell Mack	ZaSu Pitts, El Brendel, Pert Kelton	Comedy	RKO
Melody in Spring	Norman Z. McLeod	Lanny Ross, Charlie Ruggles, Mary Boland, Ann Sothern	Comedy, Musical	Paramount
Men in White	Richard Boleslawski	Clark Gable, Jean Hersholt, Myrna Loy	Drama	MGM
Men of the Night	Lambert Hillyer	Bruce Cabot, Judith Allen, Ward Bond	Drama	Columbia
Menace	Ralph Murphy	Gertrude Michael, Paul Cavanagh, Ray Milland	Horror, Mystery	Paramount
The Merry Frinks	Alfred E. Green	Aline MacMahon, Guy Kibbee, Hugh Herbert	Comedy drama	Warner Bros.
The Merry Widow	Ernst Lubitsch	Jeanette MacDonald, Maurice Chevalier, Edward Everett Horton	Comedy, Musical	MGM
Midnight	Chester Erskine	Sidney Fox, Margaret Wycherly, Humphrey Bogart	Drama, Crime	Universal
Midnight Alibi	Alan Crosland	Richard Barthelmess, Ann Dvorak, Helen Chandler	Crime	Warner Bros.
The Mighty Barnum	Walter Lang	Wallace Beery, Adolphe Menjou, Virginia Bruce	Biopic	United Artists
Mills of the Gods	Roy William Neill	May Robson, Fay Wray, Raymond Walburn	Drama	Columbia
Million Dollar Baby	Joseph Santley	Arline Judge, Ray Walker, Jeanette Loff	Comedy	Monogram
Million Dollar Ransom	Murray Roth	Phillips Holmes, Edward Arnold, Mary Carlisle	Drama	Universal
Miss Fane's Baby Is Stolen	Alexander Hall	Dorothea Wieck, Alice Brady, Alan Hale	Comedy drama	Paramount
Money Means Nothing	Christy Cabanne	Wallace Ford, Gloria Shea, Edgar Kennedy	Drama	Monogram
Monte Carlo Nights	William Nigh	Mary Brian, John Darrow, Gabby Hayes	Drama, Mystery	Monogram
The Most Precious Thing in Life	Lambert Hillyer	Richard Cromwell, Jean Arthur, Anita Louise	Drama	Columbia
Moulin Rouge	Sidney Lanfield	Constance Bennett, Franchot Tone, Tullio Carminati	Comedy, Musical	United Artists
Murder at the Vanities	Mitchell Leisen	Victor McLaglen, Carl Brisson, Kitty Carlisle	Musical	Paramount
Murder in the Clouds	D. Ross Lederman	Lyle Talbot, Ann Dvorak, Gordon Westcott	Mystery	Warner Bros.
Murder in the Private Car	Harry Beaumont	Charles Ruggles, Una Merkel, Mary Carlisle	Mystery	MGM
Murder in Trinidad	Louis King	Nigel Bruce, Heather Angel, Murray Kinnell	Mystery	Fox Film
Mrs. Wiggs of the Cabbage Patch	Norman Taurog	W. C. Fields, Pauline Lord, ZaSu Pitts	Comedy	Paramount
Murder on the Blackboard	George Archainbaud	Edna May Oliver, James Gleason, Gertrude Michael	Mystery	RKO
Music in the Air	Joe May	Gloria Swanson, John Boles, Douglass Montgomery	Musical	Fox Film
The Mysterious Mr. Wong	William Nigh	Bela Lugosi, Arline Judge, Wallace Ford	Mystery, Horror	Monogram
The Mystery of Mr. X	Edgar Selwyn	Robert Montgomery, Elizabeth Allan, Lewis Stone	Crime	MGM
Mystery Liner	William Nigh	Noah Beery, Astrid Allwyn, Gustav von Seyffertitz	Mystery	Monogram
Mystery Ranch	Bernard B. Ray	Tom Tyler, Roberta Gale, Jack Perrin	Western	Independent
Name the Woman	Albert S. Rogell	Richard Cromwell, Arline Judge, Rita La Roy	Mystery	Columbia
Nana	Dorothy Arzner, George Fitzmaurice	Anna Sten, Lionel Atwill, Mae Clarke	Drama	United Artists
Neath the Arizona Skies	Harry L. Fraser	John Wayne, Sheila Terry, Jack Rockwell	Western	Monogram
Night Alarm	Spencer Gordon Bennet	Bruce Cabot, Judith Allen, H.B. Warner	Drama	Majestic
The Ninth Guest	Roy William Neill	Genevieve Tobin, Donald Cook, Hardie Albright	Horror	Columbia
No Greater Glory	Frank Borzage	George P. Breakston, Jimmy Butler, Frankie Darro	Drama	Columbia
No More Women	Albert S. Rogell	Edmund Lowe, Victor McLaglen, Sally Blane	Adventure	Paramount
No Ransom	Fred C. Newmeyer	Leila Hyams, Phillips Holmes, Jack La Rue	Comedy	Liberty
The Notorious Sophie Lang	Ralph Murphy	Gertrude Michael, Paul Cavanagh, Arthur Byron	Crime	Pictures
Now and Forever	Henry Hathaway	Gary Cooper, Carole Lombard, Shirley Temple	Comedy, Romance	Paramount
Now I'll Tell	Edwin J. Burke	Spencer Tracy, Helen Twelvetrees, Alice Faye	Drama	Fox Film

== O-P ==
Title	Director	Cast	Genre	Notes
Of Human Bondage	John Cromwell	Bette Davis, Leslie Howard, Kay Johnson	Drama	RKO
The Oil Raider	Spencer Gordon Bennet	Buster Crabbe, Gloria Shea, George Irving	Action	Mayfair
The Old Fashioned Way	William Beaudine	W. C. Fields, Baby LeRoy, Judith Allen	Comedy	Paramount
Once to Every Bachelor	William Nigh	Marian Nixon, Neil Hamilton, Raymond Hatton	Drama	Liberty
Once to Every Woman	Lambert Hillyer	Ralph Bellamy, Fay Wray, Walter Connolly	Drama	Universal
One Exciting Adventure	Ernst L. Frank	Binnie Barnes, Neil Hamilton, Paul Cavanagh	Comedy	Universal
One Hour Late	Ralph Murphy	Helen Twelvetrees, Conrad Nagel, Arline Judge	Comedy	Paramount
One in a Million	Frank R. Strayer	Dorothy Wilson, Charles Starrett, Gwen Lee	Drama	Chesterfield
One Is Guilty	Lambert Hillyer	Ralph Bellamy, Shirley Grey, Rita La Roy	Crime	Columbia
One More River	James Whale	Diana Wynyard, Frank Lawton, Jane Wyatt	Drama	Universal
One Night of Love	Victor Schertzinger	Grace Moore, Mona Barrie, Tullio Carminati	Musical	Columbia
Operator 13	Richard Boleslawski	Marion Davies, Gary Cooper, The Mills Brothers	Comedy, Drama, Musical	MGM
Orient Express	Paul Martin	Heather Angel, Ralph Morgan, Norman Foster	Thriller	Fox Film
Our Daily Bread	King Vidor	Karen Morley, Tom Keene, Barbara Pepper	Drama	United Artists
Outcast Lady	Robert Z. Leonard	Constance Bennett, Herbert Marshall, Hugh Williams	Drama	MGM
The Painted Veil	Richard Boleslawski	Greta Garbo, Herbert Marshall, George Brent	Drama	MGM
Palooka	Benjamin Stoloff	Jimmy Durante, Lupe Vélez, Stuart Erwin	Comedy	United Artists
Paradise Valley	James P. Hogan	Wheeler Oakman, Walter Brennan, Jimmy Aubrey	Western	Independent
Paris Interlude	Edwin L. Marin	Madge Evans, Robert Young, Ted Healy	Drama, Musical	MGM
The Party's Over	Walter Lang	Stuart Erwin, Ann Sothern, Arline Judge	Comedy	Columbia
Peck's Bad Boy	Edward F. Cline	Jackie Cooper, Thomas Meighan, Dorothy Peterson	Comedy, Drama	Fox Film
The Pecos Dandy	Victor Adamson	George J. Lewis, Dorothy Gulliver, Robert Walker	Western	Independent
The Personality Kid	Alan Crosland	Pat O'Brien, Glenda Farrell, Claire Dodd	Drama	Warner Bros.
The Poor Rich	Edward Sedgwick	Edward Everett Horton, Edna May Oliver	Comedy	Universal
Port of Lost Dreams	Frank R. Strayer	William Boyd, George F. Marion, Lola Lane	Drama, Crime	Chesterfield
The Prescott Kid	David Selman	Tim McCoy, Sheila Mannors, Stephen Chase	Western	Columbia
The President Vanishes	William A. Wellman	Edward Arnold, Arthur Byron, Peggy Conklin	Drama	Paramount
Private Scandal	Ralph Murphy	ZaSu Pitts, Phillips Holmes, Mary Brian	Comedy	Paramount
Pursued	Louis King	Rosemary Ames, Victor Jory, Russell Hardie	Drama	Fox Film
The Pursuit of Happiness	Alexander Hall	Francis Lederer, Joan Bennett, Charlie Ruggles	Comedy	Paramount

== Q-R ==
Title	Director	Cast	Genre	Notes
The Quitter	Richard Thorpe	Charley Grapewin, Emma Dunn, Barbara Weeks	Drama	Chesterfield
Randy Rides Alone	Harry L. Fraser	John Wayne, Alberta Vaughn, George "Gabby" Hayes	Western	Monogram
Range Riders	Victor Adamson	Buddy Roosevelt, Lew Meehan, Merrill McCormick	Western	Independent
Rawhide Mail	Bernard B. Ray	Jack Perrin, Nelson McDowell, Richard Cramer	Western	Independent
Rawhide Romance	Victor Adamson	Jay Wilsey, Lafe McKee, Marin Sais	Western	Independent
The Rawhide Terror	Jack Nelson	Art Mix, Edmund Cobb, Frances Morris	Western	Independent
Ready for Love	Marion Gering	Richard Arlen, Ida Lupino, Marjorie Rambeau	Romance, Comedy	Paramount
Red Morning	Wallace Fox	Steffi Duna, Regis Toomey, Raymond Hatton	Adventure	RKO
Registered Nurse	Robert Florey	Bebe Daniels, Lyle Talbot, John Halliday	Drama	Warner Bros.
Return of the Terror	Howard Bretherton	Mary Astor, Lyle Talbot, Frank McHugh	Mystery	Warner Bros.
The Richest Girl in the World	William A. Seiter	Miriam Hopkins, Fay Wray, Joel McCrea	Comedy	RKO
Riding Speed	Jay Wilsey	Jay Wilsey, Bud Osborne, Lafe McKee	Western	Independent
Ridin' Thru	Harry S. Webb	Tom Tyler, Ruth Hiatt, Lafe McKee	Western	Independent
Riptide	Edmund Goulding	Norma Shearer, Robert Montgomery, Herbert Marshall	Romance	MGM
The Road to Ruin	Dorothy Davenport	Helen Foster, Nell O'Day, Paul Page	Drama	Independent
Rocky Rhodes	Alfred Raboch	Buck Jones, Sheila Terry, Walter Miller	Western	Universal
Romance in the Rain	Stuart Walker	Heather Angel, Roger Pryor, Esther Ralston	Comedy	Universal

== S-T ==
Title	Director	Cast	Genre	Notes
Sadie McKee	Clarence Brown	Joan Crawford, Franchot Tone, Edward Arnold	Drama	MGM
The Scarlet Empress	Josef von Sternberg	Marlene Dietrich, John Lodge, Sam Jaffe	Historical drama	Paramount
The Scarlet Letter	Ray Enright	Colleen Moore, Henry B. Walthall, Alan Hale	Drama	Majestic
School for Girls	William Nigh	Sidney Fox, Lois Wilson, Paul Kelly	Crime	Independent
A Scream in the Night	Fred C. Newmeyer	Lon Chaney Jr., Sheila Terry, Zarah Tazil	Thriller	Independent
Search for Beauty	Erle C. Kenton	Buster Crabbe, Ida Lupino Robert Armstrong	Comedy drama	Paramount
The Secret Bride	William Dieterle	Barbara Stanwyck, Warren William, Glenda Farrell	Drama	Warner Bros.
Secret of the Chateau	Richard Thorpe	Claire Dodd, Alice White Jack La Rue	Crime	Universal
Servants' Entrance	Frank Lloyd	Janet Gaynor, Lew Ayres, Walter Connolly	Comedy	Fox Film
Sequoia	Edwin L. Marin	Jean Parker, Russell Hardie, Samuel S. Hinds	Drama, Adventure	MGM
She Had to Choose	Ralph Ceder	Isabel Jewell, Sally Blane, Buster Crabbe	Comedy	Majestic
She Learned About Sailors	George Marshall	Alice Faye, Lew Ayres, Frank Mitchell	Comedy	Fox Film
She Love Me Not	Elliott Nugent	Miriam Hopkins, Bing Crosby, Kitty Carlisle	Romantic comedy	Paramount
She Made Her Bed	Ralph Murphy	Richard Arlen, Sally Eilers, Robert Armstrong	Comedy	Paramount
She Was a Lady	Hamilton MacFadden	Helen Twelvetrees, Donald Woods, Ralph Morgan	Drama	Fox Film
Shock	Roy Pomeroy	Ralph Forbes, Gwenllian Gill, Douglas Walton	War	Monogram
Shoot the Works	Wesley Ruggles	Jack Oakie, Ben Bernie, Dorothy Dell	Musical comedy	Paramount
The Show-Off	Charles Reisner	Spencer Tracy, Madge Evans, Henry Wadsworth	Comedy	MGM
Side Streets	Alfred E. Green	Aline MacMahon, Ann Dvorak, Paul Kelly	Drama	Warner Bros.
The Silver Streak	Tommy Atkins	Charles Starrett, Sally Blane, William Farnum	Drama	RKO
Sing and Like It	William A. Seiter	ZaSu Pitts, Pert Kelton, Edward Everett Horton	Comedy	RKO
Sing Sing Nights	Lewis D. Collins	Conway Tearle, Boots Mallory, Jameson Thomas	Drama	Monogram
Sisters Under the Skin	David Burton	Elissa Landi, Frank Morgan, Joseph Schildkraut	Drama	Columbia
Six of a Kind	Leo McCarey	Charles Ruggles, Mary Boland, George Burns	Comedy	Paramount
Sixteen Fathoms Deep	Armand Schaefer	Sally O'Neil, Lon Chaney Jr., Russell Simpson	Adventure	Monogram
Sleepers East	Kenneth MacKenna	Wynne Gibson, Preston Foster, Mona Barrie	Crime	Fox Film
Smarty	Robert Florey	Joan Blondell, Warren William, Edward Everett Horton	Comedy	Warner Bros.
Smoking Guns	Alan James	Ken Maynard, Gloria Shea, Walter Miller	Western	Universal
Social Register	Marshall Neilan	Colleen Moore, Charles Winninger, Pauline Frederick	Comedy	Columbia
Sons of Steel	Charles Lamont	Charles Starrett, Polly Ann Young, Aileen Pringle	Drama	Chesterfield
Speed Wings	Otto Brower	Tim McCoy, Evalyn Knapp, Vincent Sherman	Action	Columbia
Spitfire	John Cromwell	Katharine Hepburn, Sara Haden, Ralph Bellamy	Drama	RKO
Springtime for Henry	Frank Tuttle	Otto Kruger, Nancy Carroll, Nigel Bruce	Comedy	Fox Film
The St. Louis Kid	Ray Enright	James Cagney, Allen Jenkins, Robert Barrat	Drama	Warner Bros.
St. Louis Woman	Albert Ray	Jeanette Loff, Johnny Mack Brown, Earle Foxe	Musical drama	Independent
Stamboul Quest	Sam Wood	Myrna Loy, George Brent, Lionel Atwill	Spy	MGM
Stand Up and Cheer!	Winfield Sheehan	Warner Baxter, Madge Evans, Shirley Temple	Musical	Fox Film
The Star Packer	Robert N. Bradbury	John Wayne, Gabby Hayes, Verna Hillie	Western	Monogram
Stingaree	William A. Wellman	Irene Dunne, Richard Rix, Conway Tearle	Romance	RKO
Stolen Sweets	Richard Thorpe	Sally Blane, Charles Starrett, Jameson Thomas	Comedy	Chesterfield
Straight Is the Way	Paul Sloane	Franchot Tone, May Robson, Karen Morley	Drama	MGM
Strange Wives	Richard Thorpe	Roger Pryor, Esther Ralston, June Clayworth	Comedy	Universal
Strictly Dynamite	Elliott Nugent	Jimmy Durante, Lupe Vélez, Norman Foster	Comedy	RKO
Student Tour	Charles Reisner	Jimmy Durante, Maxine Doyle, Charles Butterworth	Comedy	MGM
Success at Any Price	J. Walter Ruben	Douglas Fairbanks Jr., Genevieve Tobin, Colleen Moore	Drama	RKO
A Successful Failure	Arthur Lubin	Russell Hopton, Gloria Shea, Jameson Thomas	Comedy	Monogram
Such Women Are Dangerous	James Flood	Warner Baxter, Rosemary Ames, Rochelle Hudson	Drama	Fox Film
Sweet Adeline	Mervyn LeRoy	Irene Dunne, Hugh Herbert, Donald Woods	Musical drama	Warner Bros.
Take the Stand	Phil Rosen	Jack La Rue, Thelma Todd, Gail Patrick	Mystery	Liberty
Tarzan and His Mate	Cedric Gibbons	Maureen O'Sullivan, Johnny Weissmuller, Neil Hamilton	Drama, Adventure	MGM
Terror of the Plains	Harry S. Webb	Tom Tyler, Roberta Gale, William Gould	Western	Independent
That's Gratitude	Frank Craven	Arthur Byron, Mary Carlisle, Frank Craven	Comedy	Columbia
Their Big Moment	James Cruze	ZaSu Pitts, Slim Summerville, Bruce Cabot	Mystery	RKO
There's Always Tomorrow	Edward Sloman	Frank Morgan, Binnie Barnes, Lois Wilson	Drama	Universal
The Thin Man	W. S. Van Dyke	William Powell, Myrna Loy, Maureen O'Sullivan, Nat Pendleton	Crime comedy	MGM
Thirty Day Princess	Marion Gering	Cary Grant, Sylvia Sidney, Edward Arnold	Comedy	Paramount
This Man Is Mine	John Cromwell	Irene Dunne, Constance Cummings, Ralph Bellamy	Drama, Romance	RKO
This Side of Heaven	William K. Howard	Lionel Barrymore, Fay Bainter, Tom Brown	Comedy, Drama	MGM
Thunder Over Texas	Edgar G. Ulmer	Guinn "Big Boy" Williams, Marion Shilling	Western	Independent
Ticket to a Crime	Lewis D. Collins	Ralph Graves, Lois Wilson, Lola Lane	Mystery	Independent
Tomorrow's Youth	Charles Lamont	Dickie Moore, Martha Sleeper, Gloria Shea	Drama	Monogram
The Trail Beyond	Robert N. Bradbury	John Wayne, Verna Hillie, Noah Beery Sr.	Western	Monogram
Transatlantic Merry-Go-Round	Benjamin Stoloff	Jack Benny, Nancy Carroll, Sydney Howard	Comedy	United Artists
Treasure Island	Victor Fleming	Wallace Beery, Jackie Cooper, Lionel Barrymore	Adventure	MGM
The Trumpet Blows	Stephen Roberts	George Raft, Adolphe Menjou, Frances Drake	Drama	Paramount
Twentieth Century	Howard Hawks	Carole Lombard, John Barrymore, Walter Connolly	Comedy	Columbia
Twenty Million Sweethearts	Ray Enright	Ginger Rogers, Dick Powell, Ted Fio Rito	Comedy, Musical	Warner Bros.
Twisted Rails	Albert Herman	Philo McCullough, Donald Keith, Alice Dahl	Action	Independent
Two Alone	Elliott Nugent	Tom Brown, Jean Parker, Zasu Pitts	Drama	RKO
Two Heads on a Pillow	William Nigh	Neil Hamilton, Miriam Jordan, Hardie Albright	Romance	Liberty

== U-Z ==
Title	Director	Cast	Genre	Notes
Uncertain Lady	Karl Freund	Genevieve Tobin, Edward Everett Horton, Paul Cavanagh	Comedy	Universal
Unknown Blonde	Hobart Henley	Edward Arnold, Barbara Barondess, Dorothy Revier	Drama	Majestic
Upper World	Roy Del Ruth	Ginger Rogers, Warren William, Mary Astor	Drama	Warner Bros.
A Very Honorable Guy	Lloyd Bacon	Joe E. Brown, Alice White, Irene Franklin	Comedy	Warner Bros.
Viva Villa!	Howard Hawks, Jack Conway	Wallace Beery, Leo Carrillo, Mary Astor	Drama, Biography	MGM
Voice in the Night	Charles C. Coleman	Tim McCoy, Billie Seward, Ward Bond	Action	Columbia
Wagon Wheels	Charles Barton	Randolph Scott, Gail Patrick, Monte Blue	Western	Paramount
Wake Up and Dream	Kurt Neumann	Russ Columbo, June Knight, Roger Pryor	Musical	Universal
The Way of the West	Robert Emmett Tansey	Hal Taliaferro, William Desmond, Art Mix	Western	Independent
We Live Again	Rouben Mamoulian	Anna Sten, Fredric March, C. Aubrey Smith	Drama	United Artists
We're Not Dressing	Norman Taurog	Bing Crosby, George Burns, Gracie Allen	Comedy, Musical	Paramount
We're Rich Again	William A. Seiter	Billie Burke, Edna May Oliver, Buster Crabbe	Comedy	RKO
Wednesday's Child	John S. Robertson	Karen Morley, Edward Arnold, Frankie Thomas	Drama	RKO
West of the Divide	Robert N. Bradbury	John Wayne, Virginia Faire Brown, George Hayes	Drama	Monogram
West of the Pecos	Phil Rosen	Richard Dix, Samuel S. Hinds, Martha Sleeper	Western	RKO
Western Racketeers	Robert J. Horner	Bill Cody, Richard Cramer, Hal Taliaferro	Western	Independent
The Westerner	David Selman	Tim McCoy, Marion Shilling, Hooper Atchley	Western	Columbia
Wharf Angel	William Cameron Menzies	Victor McLaglen, Dorothy Dell, Preston Foster	Drama	Paramount
What Every Woman Knows	Gregory La Cava	Helen Hayes, Madge Evans, Dudley Digges	Comedy, Drama	MGM
What's Your Racket?	Fred Guiol	Regis Toomey, Noel Francis, J. Carrol Naish	Crime	Independent
When a Man Sees Red	Alan James	Buck Jones, Dorothy Revier, LeRoy Mason	Western	Universal
When Lightning Strikes	Burton L. King, Harry Revier	Francis X. Bushman Jr., Alice Dahl Tom London	Western	Independent
When Strangers Meet	Christy Cabanne	Richard Cromwell, Arline Judge, Lucien Littlefield	Drama	Liberty
Whirlpool	Roy William Neill	Jean Arthur, Jack Holt, Donald Cook	Drama, Crime	Columbia
The Whirlwind Rider	Robert J. Horner	Jay Wilsey, George Chesebro, William Barrymore	Western	Independent
The White Parade	Irving Cummings	Loretta Young, John Boles, Dorothy Wilson	Drama	Fox Film
Whom the Gods Destroy	Walter Lang	Walter Connolly, Robert Young, Doris Kenyon	Drama	Columbia
A Wicked Woman	Charles Brabin	Mady Christians, Jean Parker, Charles Bickford	Drama	MGM
Wild Gold	George Marshall	John Boles, Claire Trevor, Roger Imhof	Romance	Fox Film
The Witching Hour	Henry Hathaway	John Halliday, Judith Allen, William Frawley	Drama	Paramount
The Woman Condemned	Dorothy Davenport	Claudia Dell, Lola Lane, Jason Robards Sr.	Drama, Crime	Independent
Woman in the Dark	Phil Rosen	Fay Wray, Ralph Bellamy, Melvyn Douglas	Drama, Crime	RKO
A Woman's Man	Edward Ludwig	John Halliday, Marguerite De La Motte	Comedy	Monogram
Wonder Bar	Lloyd Bacon, Busby Berkeley	Al Jolson, Dolores del Río, Kay Francis	Comedy, Musical	Warner Bros.
The World Accuses	Charles Lamont	Dickie Moore, Cora Sue Collins, Russell Hopton	Drama	Chesterfield
The World Moves On	John Ford	Franchot Tone, Madeleine Carroll, Reginald Denny	Drama, War	Fox Film
You Belong to Me	Alfred L. Werker	Lee Tracy, Helen Mack, Helen Morgan	Drama	Paramount
You Can't Buy Everything	Charles Reisner	May Robson, Jean Parker, Lewis Stone	Comedy, Drama	MGM
You're Telling Me!	Erle C. Kenton	W. C. Fields, Buster Crabbe, Joan Marsh	Comedy	Paramount
Young and Beautiful	Joseph Santley	William Haines, Joseph Cawthorn, Judith Allen	Comedy	Mascot

== Documentaries ==
Title	Director	Cast	Genre	Notes
Wild Cargo	Armand Denis	Frank Buck	Documentary	RKO

== Shorts ==
Title	Director	Cast	Genre	Notes
Managed Money	Charles Lamont	Junior Coghlan, Shirley Temple	Comedy	two-reel short
Maniac	Dwain Esper	Bill Woods, Horace Carpenter	Horror	Independent
Pardon My Pups	Charles Lamont	Junior Coghlan, Shirley Temple	Comedy	two-reel short

== See also ==
- 1934 in the United States
