= Burning Gold (1936 film) =

1936 film by Sam Newfield

- Film poster
- Directed by: Sam Newfield
- Written by: Earle Snell; Stuart Anthony
- Produced by: George A. Hirliman
- Starring: William Boyd; Judith Allen; Lloyd Ingraham
- Cinematography: Harry Forbes
- Edited by: Charles R. Hunt
- Music by: Abe Meyer
- Production company: Winchester Productions
- Distributed by: Republic Pictures
- Release date: May 22, 1936
- Running time: 65 minutes
- Country: United States
- Language: English

Burning Gold is a 1936 American drama film directed by Sam Newfield and starring William Boyd, Judith Allen and Lloyd Ingraham. It is a modern-day western about a World War I veteran who becomes a wildcat prospector for oil and enjoys a major strike.

The film's sets were designed by art director Lewis J. Rachmil. It was made as a B movie by the Poverty Row company Winchester Productions and was distributed by Republic Pictures in the US and British Lion in the United Kingdom.

Famed in his Western role of Hopalong Cassidy, Bill Boyd appeared in three 1936 films of non Western genre for Winchester Productions, all produced by George A. Hirliman, directed by Sam Newfield, and released by Republic Pictures. The other films were Federal Agent and Go-Get-'Em, Haines.

== Cast ==
- William Boyd as Jim Thornton
- Judith Allen as Caroline 'Carrie' Long
- Lloyd Ingraham as Calico
- Frank Mayo as Brent Taylor
- Fern Emmett as Cousin Lena
- Dick Curtis as Swede
- Dennis O'Keefe as Derrick Worker
- Charles King as Henchman

== Bibliography ==
- Pitts, Michael R. Western Movies: A Guide to 5,105 Feature Films. McFarland, 2012.
