= The President Vanishes (film) =

1934 film by William A. Wellman

- Directed by: William A. Wellman
- Written by: Carey Wilson; Cedric Worth
- Based on: The President Vanishes by Rex Stout
- Produced by: Walter Wanger
- Starring: Edward Arnold; Arthur Byron; Paul Kelly; Peggy Conklin; Andy Devine
- Cinematography: Barney McGill
- Edited by: Hanson T. Fritch
- Music by: Hugo Riesenfeld
- Production company: Walter Wanger Productions
- Distributed by: Paramount Pictures
- Release date: November 17, 1934
- Running time: 80 minutes
- Country: United States
- Language: English
- Budget: $290,056
- Box office: $391,542

The President Vanishes (released in the United Kingdom as Strange Conspiracy) is a 1934 American political drama film directed by William A. Wellman and produced by Walter Wanger. Starring Edward Arnold and Arthur Byron, the film is an adaptation of Rex Stout's political novel of the same name.

Upon its release, the film was praised for its ensemble cast but author John Douglas Eames, in his 1985 book The Paramount Story, stated that, even with "an accomplished cast and an out-of-the-rut story, The President Vanishes couldn't buck moviegoers' apathy towards political subjects".

== Premise ==
The film follows the story of The President Vanishes.

== Cast ==
- Edward Arnold as Secretary of War Wardell
- Arthur Byron as President Craig Stanley
- Paul Kelly as Chick Moffat
- Peggy Conklin as Alma Cronin
- Andy Devine as Val Orcott
- Janet Beecher as Mrs. Stanley
- Osgood Perkins as Harris Brownell
- Sidney Blackmer as D.L. Voorman
- Edward Ellis as Lincoln Lee
- Irene Franklin as Mrs. Orcott
- Charley Grapewin as Richard Norton
- Rosalind Russell as Sally Voorman
- Robert McWade as Vice President Robert Molleson
- DeWitt Jennings as Edward Cullen
- Walter Kingsford as Martin Drew
- Douglas Wood as Roger Grant
- Charles Richman as Judge Corcoran
- Paul Harvey as Skinner
- Jason Robards Sr. as Kilbourne
- Harry Woods as James Kramer
- Tom Dugan as Nolan
- Martha Mayo as Mrs. Delling
- John St. Polis as Attorney General Davis
- Creighton Hale as Wardell's Secretary
- J. Carrol Naish as Anti-War Demonstrator
- Harry Strang as Annapolis Academy Gatekeeper

== Hays Code ==
Upon its release in 1934, The President Vanishes was named by the National Legion of Decency — an organization of the United States Catholic Church — as one of Hollywood's problematic and "immoral" films. The Catholic Church demanded an implementation and enforcement of a set of industry censorship guidelines to control and remove content that the church saw as immoral. Threatened by a large scale boycott of all Hollywood films, Will H. Hays, then president of Motion Picture Association of America, came to an agreement with the church that saw the establishment of Production Code Administration and passage of the Motion Picture Production Code, also known as Hays Code. The Hays Code was in use from 1934 until 1968 when it was abandoned in favor of the MPAA film rating system.

== Reception ==
The film recorded a loss of $145,948.

== See also ==
- 1934 in film
- Cinema of the United States
- List of American films of 1934
