= The President Vanishes =

1934 novel by Rex Stout

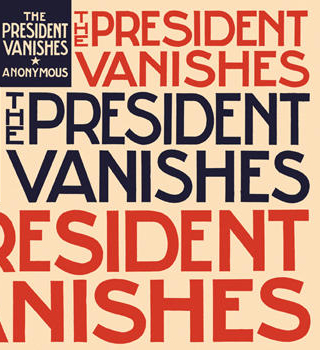
- Author: Rex Stout
- Language: English
- Genre: Political fiction
- Publisher: Farrar & Rinehart
- Publication date: September 17, 1934
- Publication place: United States
- Media type: Print (Hardcover)
- Pages: 296 pp. (first edition)

The President Vanishes is an American political novel by Rex Stout that was published in 1934. It was written after, but published before, Fer-de-Lance, the first Nero Wolfe novel.

"The President Vanishes was published anonymously," wrote Stout's authorized biographer John McAleer. "Rex had recalled the widespread speculative curiosity anonymity had engendered when, in 1880, Henry Adams concealed his authorship of Democracy (the prototypical novel in that genre which probes the Washington scene) and wanted to see what it would do for his book. As he had hoped, rumor circulated that the book was a roman a clef written by someone high in the nation's counsels. Sales were good. ... Not until 1939, when he began to take an active role in national affairs, did Rex acknowledge The President Vanishes as his own."

== Plot summary ==
The book concerns the mysterious disappearance of the President of the United States, who was facing a serious political crisis, perhaps even impeachment, over his handling of an impending war in Europe. The disappearance of the president seems like a kidnapping, but no ransom is demanded.

Although not revealed in detail until near the end, it is fairly apparent from an early stage that the president has staged his own disappearance to counter an impending military coup staged by an upstart army of fascist "Grey Shirts" allied with a small coterie of industrialists (similar to the Business Plot). The aim of all this is to involve the United States in a European war when none of the combatants has attacked American territory.

== Reviews and commentary ==
- Jacques Barzun and Wendell Hertig Taylor, A Catalogue of Crime — Published anonymously and pre-Nero Wolfe. To a reader of keener political-mindedness ... this may be a sufficiently gripping tale. A peace-loving president, in a period of European anxiety about war, is kidnapped. The reason for the deed is as surprising as the perpetrator. Politics, well done, predominate at the expense of detection.
- John McAleer, Rex Stout: A Biography — While the groundwork was being laid for the Wolfe series, Rex's pen had been active again. He had written The President Vanishes, a tale of political intrigue set in Washington, D.C. A timely novel, which portrayed the dangers in the United States of a fascist takeover patterned on Hitler's takeover of Germany, it was sold at once to Hollywood. As a forerunner of such books as Allen Drury's Advise and Consent and Fletcher Knebel's Seven Days in May it has a readily comprehensible appeal.

== Adaptations ==
Arthur Byron as President Craig Stanley in Paramount Pictures' The President Vanishes (1934)

In an interview printed in Royal Decree (1983), Rex Stout's authorized biographer John McAleer asked the author if there were any chance of Hollywood ever making a good Nero Wolfe movie. "I don't know," Stout replied. "I suppose so. They made a movie of another story I wrote — The President Vanishes. I hate like hell to admit it but it was better than the book, I think."

Paramount Pictures commenced production on its film adaptation of The President Vanishes before the book was even published. In August 1934, journalist Herbert Bayard Swope, who bore a slight resemblance to Franklin D. Roosevelt, tested for the lead role at Eastern Service Studios in Astoria, Queens. Although Swope confided to The New York Times that the results of the screen test were "not bad," he decided against playing the role.

Produced by Walter Wanger and directed by William Wellman, The President Vanishes began filming in Hollywood September 10, 1934. The film is described in John Douglas Eames' The Paramount Story:

It had an accomplished cast and an out-of-the-rut story, but The President Vanishes (British title Strange Conspiracy) couldn't buck moviegoers' apathy towards political subjects... Its hero was an isolationist President of the U.S. (Arthur Byron) at loggerheads with his pro-war cabinet; he pretends to be kidnapped, to show by the ensuing media uproar how false propaganda can mislead the public. ... In the cast: Edward Arnold, Paul Kelly, Rosalind Russell (beginning her 37-year screen career), Charley Grapewin, Peggy Conklin, Osgood Perkins, Janet Beecher, Walter Kingsford, Sidney Blackmer, and Edward Ellis.

Andre Sennwald reviewed the film for The New York Times:

Although it is unlikely to plunge the country into the bitter fratricide that preliminary gossip had led us to expect, The President Vanishes is an exciting example of the topical cinema, a racy and biting melodrama which assaults the war-makers with picturesque violence. Like the anonymous novel (generally credited to Rex Stout) upon which it is based, the photoplay tells how a peace-loving President prevents his country from being stampeded into a European war. ... For this political mystery story Walter Wanger has assembled a splendid cast... William A. Wellman, the director, has paced the narrative briskly and he gives the film a helpful, realistic atmosphere by inserting timely newsreel scenes of street fighting. The President Vanishes proves to be an absorbing essay in topical melodrama and Walter Wanger deserves applause for his courage in bringing it to the screen.

The President Vanishes was adapted for the screen by Lynn Starling, Carey Wilson and Cedric Worth, with uncredited contributions by Ben Hecht and Charles MacArthur.

"Forty-two years later, paired in a revival with Robert Penn Warren's All the King's Men, it could still stir audiences," wrote John McAleer. "For the initiated the film supplied a hint of the tale's authorship. Placing a glass of dark liquid before President Stanley, Mrs. Stanley said, 'Here's a new stout for you to try.'"

== Publication history ==
- 1934, New York: Farrar & Rinehart, September 17, 1934, hardcover, published anonymously
- 1934, New York: Grosset and Dunlap, hardcover, published anonymously
- 1967, New York: Pyramid #X-1698, September 1967; second printing November 1967; third printing November 1968; fourth printing #N3173 (new cover) October 1973; fifth printing January 1974, paperback
- 1977, New York: Jove #V-4390, September 1977, paperback
- 1982, New York: Bantam ISBN 0-553-22665-7 Nov, 1982
- 2011, New York: Bantam ISBN 978-0-307-76806-3 July 20, 2011, e-book
