= Too Much Harmony =

1933 film by A. Edward Sutherland

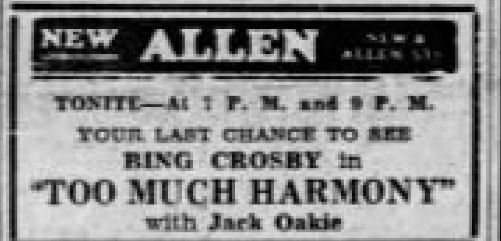
- Newspaper advertisement for film
- Directed by: A. Edward Sutherland
- Written by: Joseph L. Mankiewicz; Harry Ruskin
- Produced by: William LeBaron
- Starring: Bing Crosby; Jack Oakie; Richard "Skeets" Gallagher; Harry Green; Judith Allen
- Cinematography: Theodor Sparkuhl
- Edited by: Richard C. Currier
- Music by: Heinz Roemheld
- Production company: Paramount Pictures
- Distributed by: Paramount Pictures
- Release date: September 23, 1933
- Running time: 76 minutes
- Country: United States
- Language: English

Too Much Harmony is a 1933 American black-and-white pre-Code musical film directed by A. Edward Sutherland and starring Bing Crosby, Jack Oakie, Richard "Skeets" Gallagher, Harry Green, and Judith Allen. It was released by Paramount Pictures.

== Plot ==
A backstage musical about a Broadway star, Eddie Bronson, who is stranded with his plane in Ohio where he discovers a small-time variety act, Dixon and Day and their assistant Ruth who is also Ben Day's fiancée. When he returns to New York following a try-out of a new show, Bronson arranges for the irascible producer, Max Merlin, to put them in the show and the story develops around the mutual interest which grows between Eddie and Ruth.

At a party Bronson sings 'The Day You Came Along' and his own fiancée, Lucille, is jealous of his attentions to Ruth. Rehearsals of the show prove to be disappointing but Eddie encourages Ruth and they sing 'Thanks'. Ben decides to give up Ruth so that she can marry Eddie but Lucille will not release Eddie. Ben, with Johnny's help, masquerades as a tobacco millionaire, Charles W. Beaumont Jr., and pretends to be infatuated with Lucille, who, in her enthusiasm to obtain a millionaire husband, abandons Eddie and tells him she is breaking the engagement, which of course has the desired effect of leaving him free to marry Ruth.

The opening night is a huge success. The show includes a spectacular production number, 'Black Moonlight', sung by one of the leading ladies standing on a bridge while dancers perform on a huge draped drum. Other featured numbers are Dixon and Day's 'The Kelly's and the Cohen's', 'Cradle Me with a 'Hocha' Lullaby', 'Boo-boo-boo' and the finale 'Buckin' the Wind'.

The song 'I Guess It Had To Be That Way' was omitted from the released print of the film. Sam Coslow and Arthur Johnston also wrote 'Two Aristocrats' for this film, but it was not used.
Kitty Kelly is seen singing 'Black Moonlight', but the dubbed voice was actually that of Barbara Van Brunt. Although Crosby did not sing it in the film, and it may not have been the most tuneful of songs, his commercial recording is a prime example of his singing and style at that period.

== Cast ==
- Bing Crosby as Eddie Bronson
- Jack Oakie as Benny Day
- Richard "Skeets" Gallagher as Johnny Dixon
- Harry Green as Max Merlin
- Judith Allen as Ruth Brown
- Lilyan Tashman as Lucille Watkins
- Ned Sparks as Lem Spawn
- Kitty Kelly as Patsy Dugan
- Grace Bradley as Verne La Mond
- Evelyn Oakie as Mrs. Day (as Mrs. Evelyn Offield Oakie)
- Henry Armetta as Mr. Gallotti
- Billy Bevan as Stage Director
- Dell Henderson as Theatre Manager
- Cyril Ring as Assistant Director
- Anna Demetrio as Mrs. Gallotti
- Shirley Grey as Lilyan
- Lona Andre as Showgirl
- Verna Hillie as Showgirl

== Soundtrack ==
- "Black Moonlight"

Written by Arthur Johnston and Sam Coslow
Sung by Kitty Kelly (dubbed by Barbara Van Brunt)

- "Thanks"

Written by Arthur Johnston and Sam Coslow
Sung by Judith Allen; reprised by Bing Crosby

- "Mingle with the Hoy Palloy"

Written by Arthur Johnston and Sam Coslow
Sung by Jack Oakie and Richard 'Skeets' Gallagher

- "The Day You Came Along"

Written by Arthur Johnston and Sam Coslow
Sung by Bing Crosby

- "Boo-boo-boo"

Written by Arthur Johnston and Sam Coslow
Sung by Bing Crosby and chorus

- "Cradle Me with a Hotcha Lullaby"

Written by Arthur Johnston and Sam Coslow
Sung and danced by Grace Bradley

- "I Guess It Had to Be That Way"

Written by Arthur Johnston and Sam Coslow (omitted from released print)

- The Kellys and the Cohens

Sung by Jack Oakie and Richard "Skeets" Gallagher

- "Buckin' the Wind"

Written by Arthur Johnston and Sam Coslow
Sung by Bing Crosby

Crosby recorded some of the songs for Brunswick Records and "Thanks" and "The Day You Came Along" reached the charts of the day peaking at No. 2 and No. 3 respectively.

== Reception ==
The film was one of Paramount's biggest hits of the year.

The New York Times was guarded in its reaction. "The film bears the title of Too Much Harmony and those who are partial to crooning will find plenty of it in this production...Even persons who delight in Mr. Crosby's peculiar ballads may be somewhat disappointed in his attempts to register admiration and affection, for, although he is one of the most popular singers in his line, his acting is often apt to make one uneasy." Variety's review was mixed: "Pretty weak on the story end, but there's enough incidental matter to carry this one through. It's a musical with accent on the music and the song and cast should bring it pleasant returns all over... Between Bing Crosby and Jack Oakie, the literary deficiencies are modified. Crosby for the singing and Oakie for the comedy; a strong combo. . . At least one of the several songs should make the best-seller grade in the competent hands of Crosby. His singing ability he always had, but Crosby now has also found himself in the trouping department. It makes him a cinch." The Los Angeles Evening Herald Express liked Crosby's singing, saying "In this, as in other films, the Crosby voice records as if microphones were invented for it. Bing has definite personality besides, and he grows steadily more at ease in his acting."
