= Framed (1940 film) =

- Theatrical release poster
- Directed by: Harold D. Schuster
- Screenplay by: Roy Chanslor
- Produced by: Ben Pivar
- Starring: Frank Albertson; Constance Moore; Jerome Cowan; Robert Armstrong; Sidney Blackmer; Judith Allen; Herbert Rawlinson
- Cinematography: Jerome Ash
- Edited by: Otto Ludwig
- Production company: Universal Pictures
- Distributed by: Universal Pictures
- Release date: February 23, 1940
- Running time: 60 minutes
- Country: United States
- Language: English

Framed is a 1940 American crime film directed by Harold D. Schuster and written by Roy Chanslor. The film stars Frank Albertson, Constance Moore, Jerome Cowan, Robert Armstrong, Sidney Blackmer, Judith Allen and Herbert Rawlinson. The film was released on February 23, 1940, by Universal Pictures.

== Cast ==
- Frank Albertson as Henry T. Parker
- Constance Moore as Phyllis Sanderson
- Jerome Cowan as Monty de Granville
- Robert Armstrong as Skippy
- Sidney Blackmer as Tony Bowman
- Judith Allen as Gwen Porter
- Herbert Rawlinson as Walter Billings
- Vinton Hayworth as Nick
- Milburn Stone as Mathew Mattison
- Barbara Pepper as Goldie Green
