= Behind the Green Lights =

1935 film by Christy Cabanne

- Directed by: Christy Cabanne
- Written by: Colbert Clark; James Gruen; Cornelius W. Willemse
- Produced by: Colbert Clark; Nat Levine
- Starring: Norman Foster; Judith Allen; Sidney Blackmer
- Cinematography: Jack A. Marta; Ernest Miller
- Edited by: Joseph H. Lewis
- Music by: Mischa Bakaleinikoff; Charles Rosoff
- Production company: Mascot Pictures
- Distributed by: Mascot Pictures
- Release date: March 11, 1935
- Running time: 68 minutes
- Country: United States
- Language: English

Behind the Green Lights is a 1935 American crime film directed by Christy Cabanne and starring Norman Foster, Judith Allen and Sidney Blackmer.

== Partial cast ==
- Norman Foster as Detective Lt. Dave Britten
- Judith Allen as Mary Kennedy
- Sidney Blackmer as Raymond Cortell
- Purnell Pratt as Detective Lt. Jim Kennedy
- Theodore von Eltz as John C. Owen
- Ford Sterling as Max Schultz, German Janitor
- Kenneth Thomson as Charles T. 'Ritzy' Conrad
- Lloyd Whitlock as Assistant District Attorney
- Edward Hearn as Detective Brewster
- Jane Meredith as Mrs. Gorham
- Edward Gargan as Moran - a Cop
- J. Carrol Naish as Sam Dover
- John Davidson as Beasley
- Hooper Atchley as District Attorney Marsden
- Marc Loebell as Manny Spivalo
- Fern Emmett as Sarah - the Cook
- John Ince as Judge #1
- Ralph Lewis as Judge #2 / Lawyer

== Bibliography ==
- Goble, Alan. The Complete Index to Literary Sources in Film. Walter de Gruyter, 1999.
