= It Happened Out West =

1937 film by Howard Bretherton

- Theatrical release poster
- Directed by: Howard Bretherton
- Screenplay by: Earle Snell; John Roberts
- Story by: Harold Bell Wright
- Produced by: Sol Lesser
- Starring: Paul Kelly; Judith Allen; Johnny Arthur; LeRoy Mason; Lew Kelly; Russell Hicks
- Cinematography: Harry Neumann
- Edited by: Harry Hilton
- Production company: 20th Century Fox
- Distributed by: 20th Century Fox
- Release date: May 2, 1937
- Running time: 65 minutes
- Country: United States
- Language: English

It Happened Out West is a 1937 American Western film directed by Howard Bretherton and written by Earle Snell and John Roberts. The film stars Paul Kelly, Judith Allen, Johnny Arthur, LeRoy Mason, Lew Kelly, and Russell Hicks. The film was released on May 2, 1937, by 20th Century Fox.

== Plot ==
An outlaw tries to cheat an Arizona rancher out of her silver-rich land.

== Cast ==
- Paul Kelly as Richard P. 'Dick' Howe
- Judith Allen as Ann Martin
- Johnny Arthur as Professor Thad Crookshank
- LeRoy Mason as Bert Travis
- Lew Kelly as Diner Counterman
- Russell Hicks as Cooley
- Henry Otho as Henchman Hank
- Ted Adams as Henchman Tex
- Reginald Barlow as Middleton
- Steve Clemente as Pedro
- Nina Campana as Maria
- Ed Brady as Sheriff (uncredited)
- Ben Corbett as Gimpy (uncredited)
- Henry Hall as Man Who Points Out Cafe (uncredited)
- Archie Ricks as Red (uncredited)
- Bob Woodward as Tom Roberts (uncredited)
