= Milburn Stone =

American actor (1904–1980)

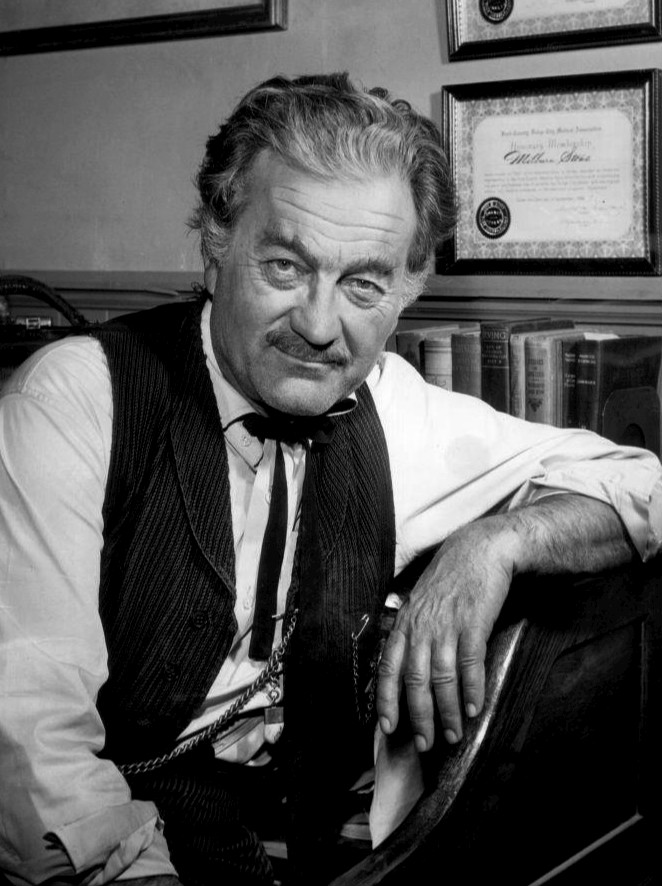
- Stone in 1959
- Born: Hugh Milburn Stone; July 5, 1904; Burrton, Kansas, U.S.
- Died: June 12, 1980 (aged 75); La Jolla, California, U.S.
- Resting place: El Camino Memorial Park, Sorrento Valley, California, U.S.
- Occupation: Actor
- Years active: 1919–1979
- Spouses: Ellen Morrison Stone (m. 1925; died 1937) Jane Garrison Stone (m. 1939; div. 1940) (m. 1946)
- Children: 1
- Relatives: Fred Stone (uncle); Madge Blake (first cousin)

Hugh Milburn Stone (July 5, 1904 – June 12, 1980) was an American actor, best known for his role as "Doc" (Dr Galen Adams) in the Western series Gunsmoke.

== Early life ==
Stone was born in Burrton, Kansas, to Herbert Stone and the former Laura Belfield. He graduated from Burrton High School, where he was active in the drama club, played basketball and sang in a barbershop quartet. Stone's brother, Joe Stone, says their uncle, Fred Stone, was a versatile actor who appeared on Broadway and in circuses).

Although Stone had a congressional appointment to the United States Naval Academy, he turned it down, choosing instead to become an actor with a stock theater company headed by Helen Ross. The Burton town doctor, Joseph Wakefield Myers MD, was the town doctor from 1913 to 1928. Hugh was known to have said he styled his portrayal of a country doctor based on Dr Myers.

== Career ==
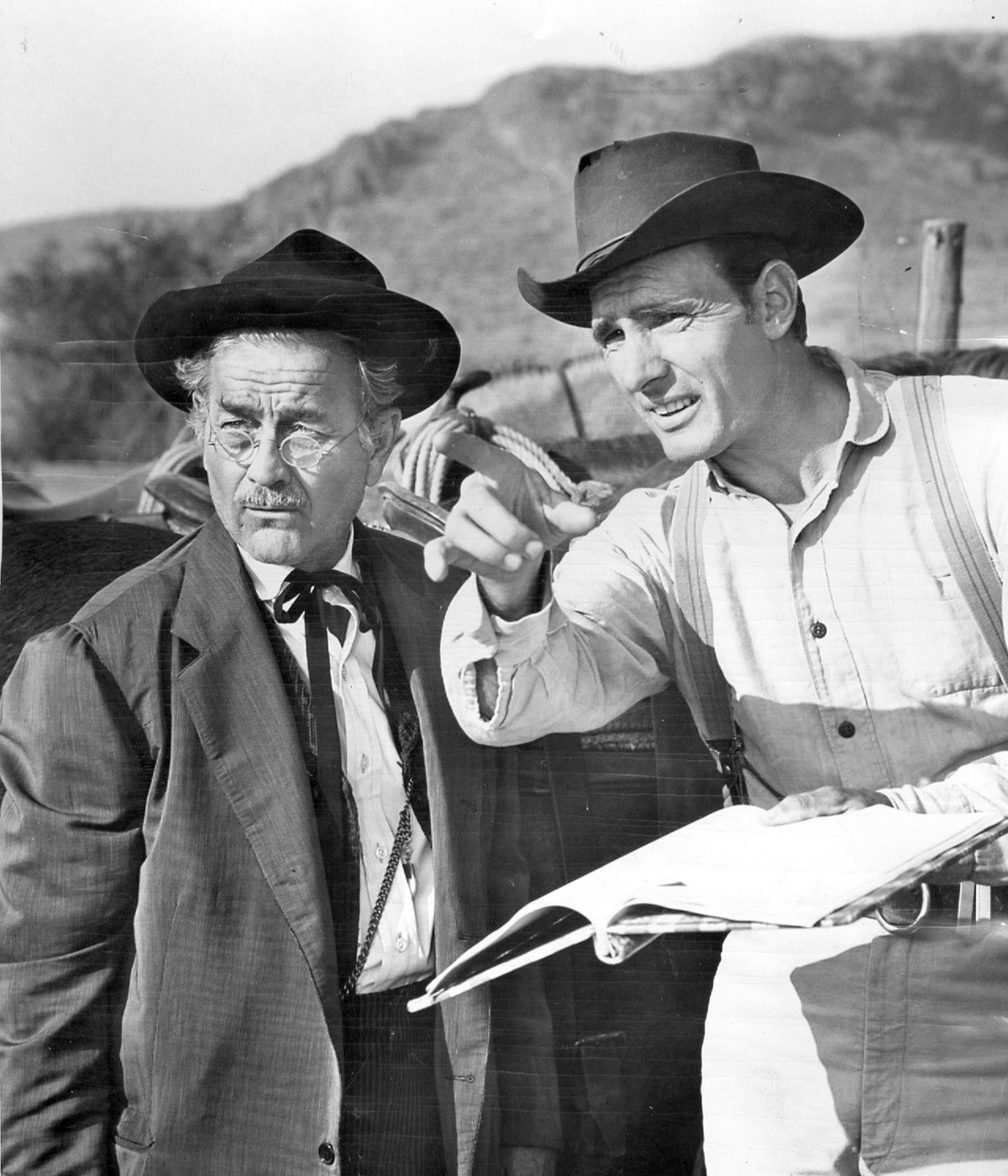
With Dennis Weaver on the Gunsmoke set, 1961

In 1919, Stone debuted on stage in a Kansas tent show. He ventured into vaudeville in the late 1920s, and in 1930, he was half of the Stone and Strain song-and-dance act. His Broadway credits include Around the Corner (1936) and Jayhawker (1934).

In the 1930s, Stone came to Los Angeles, California, to launch his own screen career. He was featured in the Tailspin Tommy adventure serial for Monogram Pictures. In 1939 he played Stephen Douglass in the movie Young Mr. Lincoln with Henry Fonda and Ward Bond. In 1939 he appeared in When Tomorrow Comes as head busboy (uncredited). In 1940, he appeared with Marjorie Reynolds, Tristram Coffin, and I. Stanford Jolley in the comedy espionage film Chasing Trouble. That same year, he co-starred with Roy Rogers in the film Colorado in the role of Rogers' brother-gone-wrong.

Stone appeared uncredited in the 1939 film Blackwell's Island. Stone played Dr. Blake in the 1943 film Gung Ho! and a liberal-minded warden in Monogram Pictures' Prison Mutiny also in 1943. Signed by Universal Pictures in 1943, in the films Captive Wild Woman (1943), Jungle Woman (1943), Sherlock Holmes Faces Death [Captain Pat Vickery], (1944), he became a familiar face in its features and serials, starring as hero Jim Hudson in The Great Alaskan Mystery (1944). In 1944, he portrayed a Ration Board representative in the Universal-produced public service film Prices Unlimited for the U.S. Office of Price Administration and the Office of War Information. One of his film roles was a radio columnist in the Gloria Jean-Kirby Grant musical I'll Remember April. He made such an impression in this film that Universal Studios gave him a starring role (and a similar characterization) in the 1945 serial The Master Key. The same year, he was featured in the Inner Sanctum murder mystery The Frozen Ghost. In 1953, Stone appeared as Charlton Heston's sidekick in Arrowhead, a Western also featuring Brian Keith and Katy Jurado.

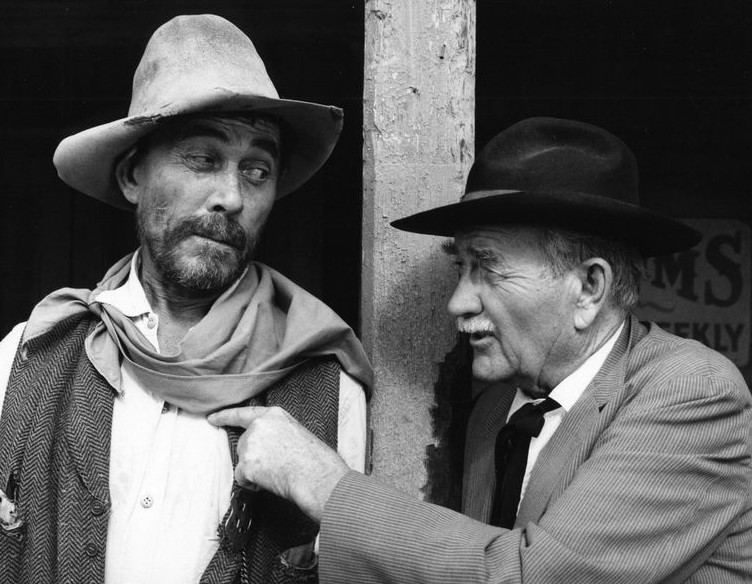
With Ken Curtis, 1974

In 1955, one of CBS Radio's hit series, the Western Gunsmoke, was adapted for television and recast with different actors for various reasons (William Conrad was judged too obese to play Matt Dillon on camera, Georgia Ellis wasn't viewed as quite telegenic enough to portray Kitty on television, etc.). Howard McNear, the radio Doc Adams (who later played Floyd the barber on television's The Andy Griffith Show), was replaced by Stone, who gave the role a harder edge consistent with his screen portrayals. He stayed with Gunsmoke through its entire television run, with the exception of 7 episodes in 1971, when Stone required heart surgery and Pat Hingle replaced him as Dr. Chapman. Stone appeared in 604 episodes through 1975, often shown sparring in a friendly manner with co-stars Dennis Weaver and Ken Curtis, who played, respectively, Chester Goode and Festus Haggen.

== Personal life ==
Stone's brother, Joe, was a writer who was the author of scripts for three episodes of Gunsmoke.

Stone was a first cousin of the character actress Madge Blake.

In March 1971, Stone had heart bypass surgery at UAB Hospital in Birmingham, Alabama. In June 1980, Stone died of a heart attack in La Jolla. He was buried at the El Camino Memorial Park in Sorrento Valley, San Diego.

Stone had a surviving daughter, Shirley Stone Gleason (born circa 1926) of Costa Mesa, California, from his first marriage of 12 years to Ellen Morrison, formerly of Delphos, Kansas, who died in 1937. His second wife, the former Jane Garrison, a native of Hutchinson, Kansas, died in 2002. Stone had married, divorced, and remarried Garrison.

== Legacy ==
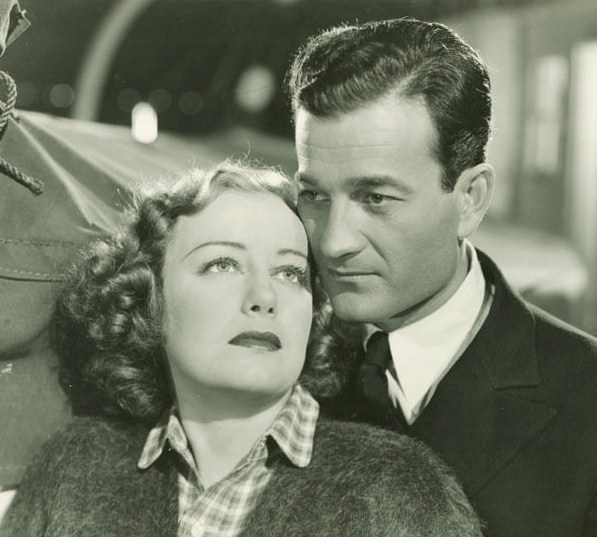
Judith Allen and Stone in The Port of Missing Girls (1938)

In 1968, Stone received an Emmy Award for Outstanding Performance by an Actor in a Supporting Role in a Drama for his work on Gunsmoke.

In 1975, Stone received an honorary doctorate from St. Mary of the Plains College in Dodge City, Kansas, where Gunsmoke was set but not filmed.

For his contribution to the television industry, Milburn Stone has a star on the Hollywood Walk of Fame at 6801 Hollywood Boulevard. (Note: The Hollywood Walk of Fame's website designates Stone as a Star of Motion Pictures and gives the address of his star as 6823 Hollywood Boulevard.) In 1981, Stone was inducted posthumously into the Western Performers Hall of Fame at the National Cowboy & Western Heritage Museum in Oklahoma City. After his death, he left a legacy for the performing arts in Cecil County in northeastern Maryland, by way of the Milburn Stone Theatre in North East, Maryland.

== Selected filmography ==
- Ladies Crave Excitement (1935) as Sailor (uncredited)
- Cheers of the Crowd (1935) as Reporter (uncredited)
- His Night Out (1935) as Salesman (uncredited)
- Rendezvous (1935) as Carter's Aide (uncredited)
- The Fighting Marines (1935, Serial) as Red - Henchman [Ch. 2,4-7,10,11] (uncredited)
- The Milky Way (1936) as Reporter (uncredited)
- The Princess Comes Across (1936) as American Reporter (uncredited)
- Nobody's Fool (1936) as Clerk (uncredited)
- China Clipper (1936) as Radio Operator
- The Three Mesquiteers (1936) as John
- Murder with Pictures (1936) as Operator (uncredited)
- Two in a Crowd (1936) as Kennedy (uncredited)
- Rose Bowl (1936) as Booster Club Band Member (uncredited)
- The Man I Marry (1936) as Stage manager (uncredited)
- The Accusing Finger (1936) as Convict (uncredited)
- Banjo on My Knee (1936) as Eddie - Sailor (uncredited)
- Three Smart Girls (1936) as Telegraph Desk Clerk (uncredited)
- A Doctor's Diary (1937) as Fred Clark
- Swing It, Professor (1937) as Lou Morgan
- They Gave Him a Gun (1937) as Defense Attorney (uncredited)
- Wings Over Honolulu (1937) as Telephone Operator (uncredited)
- The Man in Blue (1937) as Henchman 'Dutch'
- The Wildcatter (1937) as Ed
- You Can't Beat Love (1937) as Reporter Wilson (uncredited)
- The 13th Man (1937) as Jimmy Moran
- Blazing Barriers (1937) as Joe Waters
- Reported Missing! (1937) as Radio operator (uncredited)
- Atlantic Flight (1937) as Henry Wadsworth 'Pokey' Schultz
- Youth on Parole (1937) as Ratty
- Music for Madame (1937) as Detective (uncredited)
- Federal Bullets (1937) as Tommy Thompson, Federal Agent
- Mr. Boggs Steps Out (1938) as Burns
- The Port of Missing Girls (1938) as Jim Benton
- Sinners in Paradise (1938) as Honeyman
- Wives Under Suspicion (1938) as Kirk
- Paroled from the Big House (1938) as Commissioner Downey
- The Storm (1938) as Hagen - officer on SS Orion (uncredited)
- California Frontier (1938) as Mal Halstead
- Blackwell's Island (1938) as Max (deputy commissioner) (uncredited)
- Made for Each Other (1939) as Newark Official (uncredited)
- King of the Turf (1939) as Taylor
- Tail Spin (1939) as Kansas City Mechanic (uncredited)
- Society Smugglers (1939) as Peter Garfield
- Mystery Plane (1939) as 'Skeeter' Milligan
- The Spirit of Culver (1939) as Instructor (uncredited)
- Blind Alley (1939) as Nick
- Young Mr. Lincoln (1939) as Stephen A. Douglas (uncredited)
- Stunt Pilot (1939) as 'Skeeter' Milligan
- When Tomorrow Comes (1939) as Head Busboy (uncredited)
- Tropic Fury (1939) as Thomas E. Snell
- Danger Flight (1939) as Skeeter Milligan
- Fighting Mad (1939) as Cardigan
- Crashing Thru (1939) as Delos Harrington
- Nick Carter, Master Detective (1939) as Dave Krebs
- The Big Guy (1939) as Publicity man (uncredited)
- Charlie McCarthy, Detective (1939) as Joe Felton (uncredited)
- Chasing Trouble (1940) as Pat Callahan
- Framed (1940) as Mathew Mattison
- Black Friday (1940) as Reporter at Execution (uncredited)
- Johnny Apollo (1940) as Main Reporter (uncredited)
- Enemy Agent (1940) as Meeker
- An Angel from Texas (1940) as 'Pooch' Davis (uncredited)
- Lillian Russell (1940) as Jack - Reporter (uncredited)
- Public Deb No. 1 (1940) as Reporter (uncredited)
- Colorado (1940) as Don Burke alias Captain Mason
- Give Us Wings (1940) as Tex Austin
- The Great Plane Robbery (1940 film) as Krebber
- The Phantom Cowboy (1941) as Stan Borden
- The Great Train Robbery (1941) as Duke Logan
- Death Valley Outlaws (1941) as Jeff
- No Hands on the Clock (1941) as FBI Man (uncredited)
- Frisco Lil (1942) as Mike
- Reap the Wild Wind (1942) as Lieutenant Farragut
- Pacific Rendezvous (1942) as Park Hotel Desk Clerk (uncredited)
- Rubber Racketeers (1942) as Angel
- Invisible Agent (1942) as German Sergeant (uncredited)
- Police Bullets (1942) as Johnny Reilly
- Eyes in the Night (1942) as Detective Pete (uncredited)
- Silent Witness (1943) as Racketeer Joe Manson
- You Can't Beat the Law (1943) as Frank Sanders
- Submarine Alert (1943) as Lt. Winston - Naval Intelligence (uncredited)
- Keep 'Em Slugging (1943) as Duke Redman
- Captive Wild Woman (1943) as Fred Mason
- Get Going (1943) as Mr. Tuttle
- Destroyer (1943) as Radioman (uncredited)
- Sherlock Holmes Faces Death (1943) as Captain Vickery
- Corvette K-225 (1943) as Canadian Captain (uncredited)
- The Mad Ghoul (1943) as Macklin
- Gung Ho! (1943) as Cmdr. Blake
- The Impostor (1944) as Chauzel
- Phantom Lady (1944) as District Attorney (voice)
- Weird Woman (1944) as Radio Announcer (voice, uncredited)
- Hat Check Honey (1944) as David Courtland
- Hi, Good Lookin'! (1944) as Bill Eaton
- Moon Over Las Vegas (1944) as Jim Bradley
- The Great Alaskan Mystery (1944, Serial) as Jim Hudson
- Gambler's Choice (1944) as Doctor (uncredited)
- Twilight on the Prairie (1944) as Gainsworth
- Jungle Woman (1944) as Fred Mason
- She Gets Her Man (1945) as 'Tommy Gun' Tucker
- I'll Remember April (1945) as Willie Winchester
- The Master Key (1945, Serial) as Agent Tom Brant
- Swing Out, Sister (1945) as Tim Colby
- The Frozen Ghost (1945) as George Keene
- On Stage Everybody (1945) as Fitzgerald
- The Beautiful Cheat (1945) as Lucius Haven
- Strange Confession (1945) as Stevens
- The Royal Mounted Rides Again (1945, Serial) as Brad Taggart
- The Daltons Ride Again (1945) as Parker W. Graham
- The Scarlet Horseman (1946, Serial) as Narrator (voice, uncredited)
- Little Giant (1946) as Prof. Watkins (voice, uncredited)
- Smooth as Silk (1946) as John Kimble
- The Spider Woman Strikes Back (1946) as Mr. Moore
- Strange Conquest (1946) as Bert Morrow
- Her Adventurous Night (1946) as Cop #1
- Inside Job (1946) as District Attorney Sutton
- Danger Woman (1946) as Gerald King
- Little Miss Big (1946) as Father Lennergan
- The Michigan Kid (1947) as Lanny Slade
- Smash-Up: The Story of a Woman (1947) as Raven Club Announcer (voice), (uncredited)
- Buck Privates Come Home (1947) as Announcer
- Time Out of Mind (1947 film) as Stage Manager (uncredited)
- Killer Dill (1947) as Maboose
- Cass Timberlane (1947) as Nestor Purdwin (uncredited)
- Heading for Heaven (1947) as Elwood Harding
- Killer McCoy (1947) as Henchman (uncredited)
- Train to Alcatraz (1948) as Bart Kanin
- The Judge (1949) as Martin Strang
- The Green Promise (1949) as Reverend Jim Benton
- Sky Dragon (1949) as Capt. Tim Norton
- Calamity Jane and Sam Bass (1949) as Abe Jones
- No Man of Her Own (1950) as Plainclothesman
- Snow Dog (1950) as Dr. F. J. McKenzie
- The Fireball (1950) as Jeff Davis
- Branded (1950) as Dawson
- Operation Pacific (1951) as Ground Control Officer (uncredited)
- Flying Leathernecks (1951) as Fleet CIC Radio Operator (uncredited)
- Roadblock (1951) as Ray Evans
- The Racket (1951) as Member of Craig's Team (uncredited)
- The Atomic City (1952) as Insp. Harold Mann
- The Savage (1952) as Cpl. Martin
- Invaders from Mars (1953) as Capt. Roth
- The Sun Shines Bright (1953) as Horace K. Maydew
- Pickup on South Street (1953) as Detective Winoki
- Second Chance (1953) as Edward Dawson
- Arrowhead (1953) as Sandy MacKinnon
- Siege at Red River (1954) as Sgt. Benjamin 'Benjy' Guderman
- Black Tuesday (1954) as Father Slocum
- The Long Gray Line (1955) as Capt. John Pershing
- White Feather (1955) as Commissioner Trenton
- Smoke Signal (1955) as Sgt. Miles
- The Private War of Major Benson (1955) as Maj. Gen. Wilton J. Ramsey
- Gunsmoke (1955–1975, TV Series) as Doc Adams (final appearance)
- Drango (1957) as Col. Bracken
