= The Port of Missing Girls (1938 film) =

1938 film by Karl Brown

- Directed by: Karl Brown
- Written by: Karl Brown
- Produced by: Lon Young
- Starring: Harry Carey
- Cinematography: Gilbert Warrenton
- Production company: Monogram Pictures
- Release date: February 23, 1938
- Running time: 65 minutes
- Country: United States
- Language: English

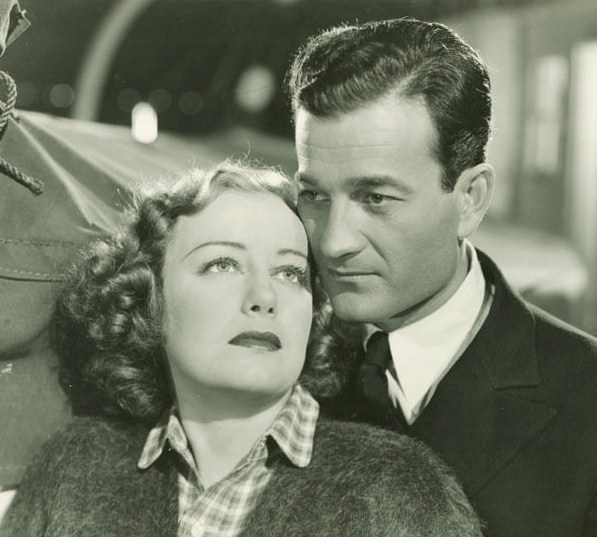
Judith Allen and Milburn Stone in The Port of Missing Girls (1938)

The Port of Missing Girls is a 1938 American film directed by Karl Brown and starring Harry Carey.

== Cast ==
- Harry Carey as Captain Josiah Storm
- Judith Allen as Della Mason
- Milburn Stone as Jim Benton
- Betty Compson as Chicago
- Matty Fain as Duke Ransom
- George Cleveland as Clinton
- Jane Jones as Minnie
- Willy Castello as Manuel

== Soundtrack ==
- Judith Allen - "Dream Cargo" (Written by Eddie Cherkose and Charles Rosoff)
- Judith Allen - "One, Night, One Kiss and You" (Written by Eddie Cherkose and Charles Rosoff)
- Jane Jones - "I Changed My Routine" (Written by Eddie Cherkose and Charles Rosoff)
