= The Healer (1935 film) =

1935 film by Reginald Barker

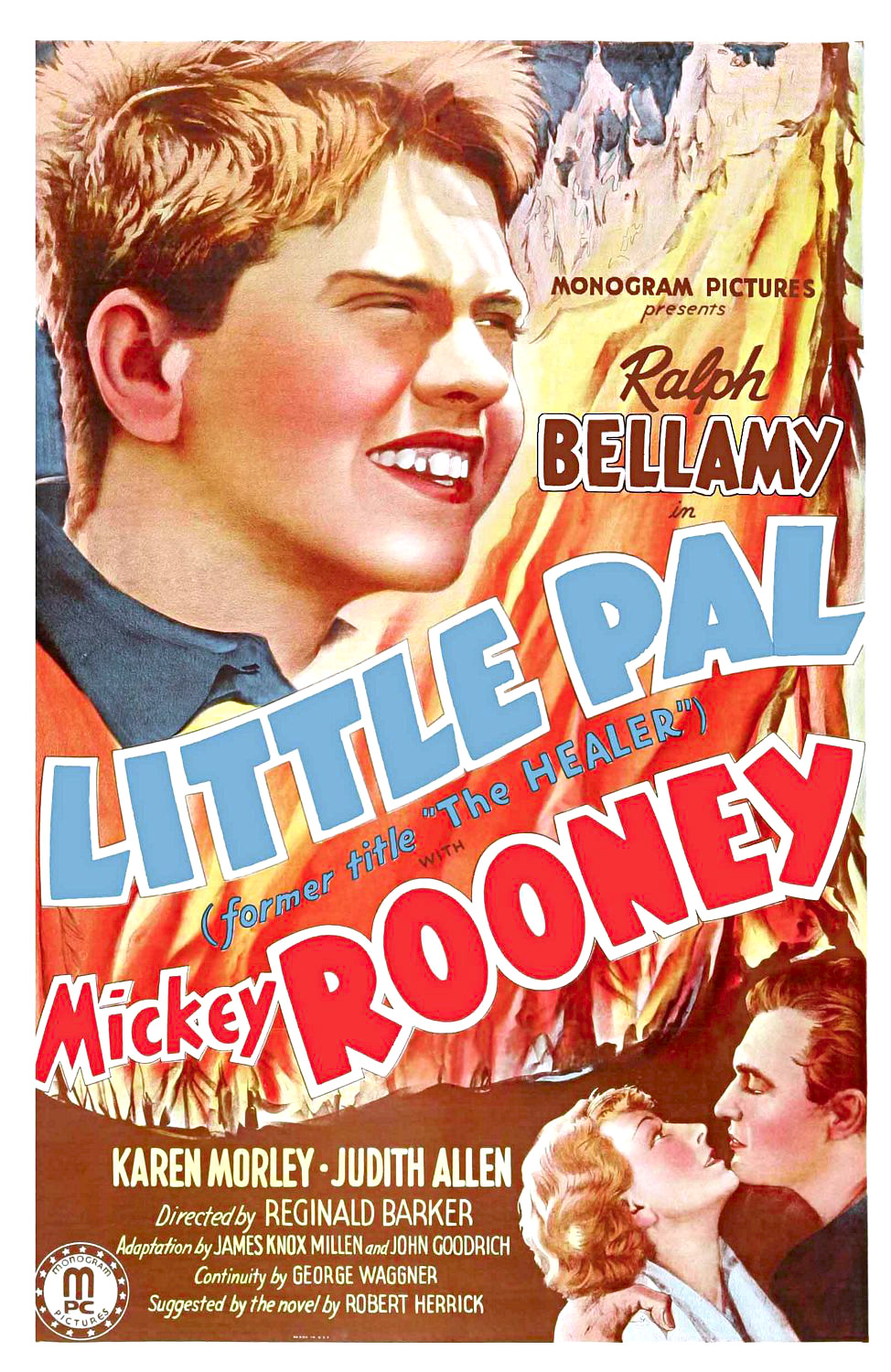
- Directed by: Reginald Barker
- Written by: John F. Goodrich (adaptation); Robert Herrick (novel The Healer); James Knox Millen (adaptation); George Waggner (continuity and dialogue)
- Starring: Ralph Bellamy; Karen Morley; Mickey Rooney
- Cinematography: Harry Neumann
- Edited by: Jack Ogilvie
- Distributed by: Monogram Pictures
- Release date: June 15, 1935
- Running time: 76 minutes
- Country: United States
- Language: English

The Healer is a 1935 American film directed by Reginald Barker. The film is also known as Little Pal.

== Plot ==
Dr. Holden (Ralph Bellamy) is "The Healer" (the original title) in this 1930s morally uplifting pot-boiler. He is a doctor that has come home to a warm springs to try to heal children from the unnamed crippling disease (polio). He runs a destitute camp for these children, assisted by Evelyn Allen (Karen Morley) who looks upon the Doc as a great man. Jimmy (Mickey Rooney) is a paraplegic kid whom the Doc promises to cure. This little triangle is interrupted by a rich girl Joan Bradshaw (Judith Allen) who cons the good Doc into building a sanitorium for the wealthy with her father's money. Doc is momentarily swayed, but comes to his senses just as a forest fire threatens his original cabins around the warm spring. His treatment of Jimmy pays off as Jimmy rides a bicycle to save the day. Doc realizes that his true love is Evelyn, not the self-interested Joan.

== Cast ==
- Ralph Bellamy as Dr. Holden
- Karen Morley as Evelyn Allen
- Mickey Rooney as Jimmy
- Judith Allen as Joan Bradshaw
- Robert McWade as Mr. Bradshaw
- Bruce Warren as Dr. Thornton
- J. Farrell MacDonald as Applejack
- Vessie Farrell as Martha
