= Dancing Man (film) =

1934 film

- Directed by: Albert Ray
- Written by: Albert Ray
- Produced by: Rose Judell Reisman
- Starring: Reginald Denny; Judith Allen; Edmund Breese
- Cinematography: James S. Brown Jr.
- Edited by: Dan Milner
- Production company: Pyramid Productions
- Distributed by: Pyramid Productions
- Release date: February 23, 1934
- Running time: 64 minutes
- Country: United States
- Language: English

Dancing Man is a 1934 American pre-Code mystery film directed by Albert Ray and starring Reginald Denny, Judith Allen and Edmund Breese. Allen was loaned out from Paramount Pictures where she was under contract.

== Plot ==
Paul Drexel makes his living as a taxi dancer escorting wealthy woman to dance halls. He meets and falls in love with Diane Trevor, but then to her horror she discovers that he one of his previous clients was her stepmother, Tamara. When Tamara is found murdered, all suspicions seem to point towards Drexel.

== Cast ==
- Reginald Denny as Paul Drexel
- Judith Allen as Diane Trevor
- Edmund Breese as J.C. Trevor
- Natalie Moorhead as Tamara Trevor
- Edwin Maxwell as Morton Randall
- Douglas Cosgrove as Donovan
- Robert Ellis as Cavendish
- Charlotte Merriam as Celestine Castle
- Huntley Gordon as Mason
- Maude Truax as Mrs. St. John
- Donald Stuart as Eddie Stryker

== Bibliography ==
- Langman, Larry & Finn, Daniel. A Guide to American Crime Films of the Thirties. Greenwood Press, 1995.
- Pitts, Michael R. Poverty Row Studios, 1929–1940. McFarland & Company, 2005.
