= Marrying Widows =

1934 film

- Directed by: Sam Newfield
- Written by: Adele Buffington
- Produced by: Sigmund Neufeld; Leslie Simmonds
- Starring: Judith Allen; Johnny Mack Brown; Minna Gombell
- Cinematography: Harry Forbes
- Production company: Tower Productions
- Distributed by: Capitol Film Exchange
- Release date: May 18, 1934
- Running time: 67 minutes
- Country: United States
- Language: English

Marrying Widows is a 1934 American pre-Code drama film directed by Sam Newfield and starring Judith Allen, Johnny Mack Brown and Minna Gombell.

== Plot ==
After the death of her sewing machine tycoon husband, a young woman is cold-shouldered by her grasping in-laws. She heads to New York City and meets a man, falls in love and gets married. Unknown to her, her new husband is after what he thinks to be her fortune, in revenge for the theft of his father's patents that made the sewing machine profits. Discovering that she is in fact penniless, they both reconcile.

== Cast ==
- Judith Allen as The Widow
- Johnny Mack Brown as The Husband
- Minna Gombell as The Press Agent
- Lucien Littlefield as The Brother-In-Law
- Bert Roach as The Husband's Partner
- Sarah Padden
- Virginia Sale
- Nat Carr
- Arthur Hoyt
- Otto Hoffman
- Syd Saylor
- Gladys Blake
- George Grandee

== Bibliography ==
- Parish, James Robert & Pitts, Michael R. Film directors: a guide to their American films. Scarecrow Press, 1974.
