= This Man Is Mine (1934 film) =

1934 film by John Cromwell

- Directed by: John Cromwell
- Screenplay by: Jane Murfin
- Based on: Love Flies in the Window; 1933 play by Anne Morrison Chapin
- Produced by: Merian C. Cooper
- Starring: Irene Dunne; Constance Cummings; Ralph Bellamy
- Cinematography: David Abel
- Edited by: William Morgan
- Music by: Max Steiner
- Distributed by: RKO Radio Pictures, Inc.
- Release date: April 13, 1934
- Running time: 76 min.
- Country: United States
- Language: English

This Man is Mine is a 1934 American pre-Code drama film directed by John Cromwell and starring Irene Dunne, Ralph Bellamy, and Constance Cummings. It is based on the play Love Flies in the Window by Anne Morrison Chapin.

== Plot ==
Tony and Jim Dunlap are happily married. However, the dull-but-dependable Jim had been in love with Fran Harper, a school friend of Tony, before he and Tony married. Fran has just been divorced. Now Fran is coming their way, bringing her pick-up boyfriend Mort Holmes along, and she intends to steal Jim from Tony.

Tony sees Fran as a reminder of her own mother, who left Tony's father and caused him to drink himself to death. Thus, Tony is determined to avoid meeting Fran. However, they meet at the house of their friends, Jud and Bee McCrae, and Fran goes off with Jim after everyone has left. When Tony finds that Jim and Fran have been together, she threatens to divorce him. However, Tony eventually beats Fran at her own game, and wins Jim back.

== Cast ==
- Irene Dunne as Tony Dunlap
- Constance Cummings as Francesca Harper
- Ralph Bellamy as Jim Dunlap
- Kay Johnson as Bee McCrae
- Charles Starrett as Jud McCrae
- Vivian Tobin as Rita
- Sidney Blackmer as Mort Holmes
- Louis Mason as Slim
