= Judith Allen =

American actress (1911–1996)

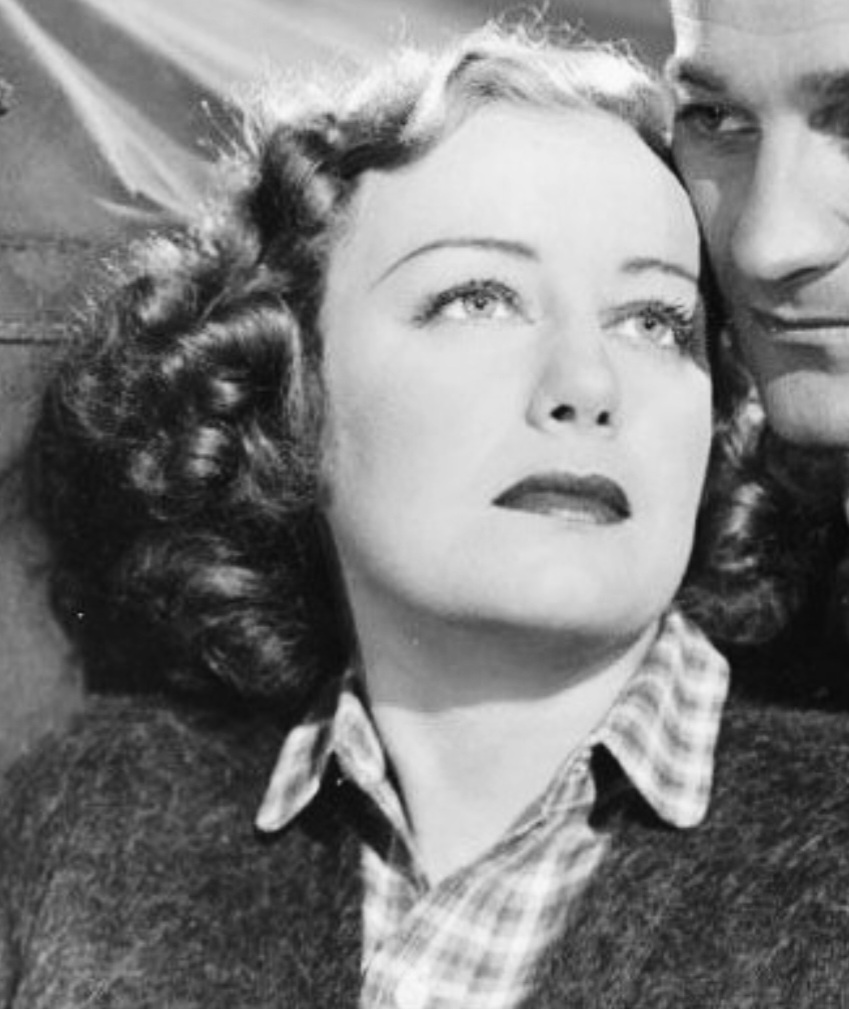
- Allen in The Port of Missing Girls (1938)
- Born: Marie Elliott; February 8, 1911; New York City, U.S.
- Died: October 5, 1996 (aged 85); Yucca Valley, California, U.S.
- Other names: Mari Colman
- Occupation: Actress
- Years active: 1933–1952
- Spouses: Gus Sonnenberg (m. 1931; div. 1933) Jack Doyle (m. 1935; div. 1938) Rudolph Field (m. 1941; ann. 1945)

Judith Allen (born Marie Elliott; February 8, 1911 – October 5, 1996) was an American actress.

== Early years ==
Allen was born Marie Elliott in New York City, and she grew up in Belmont, Massachusetts. She attended Leland Powers School in Boston and gained acting experience with a stock theater company.

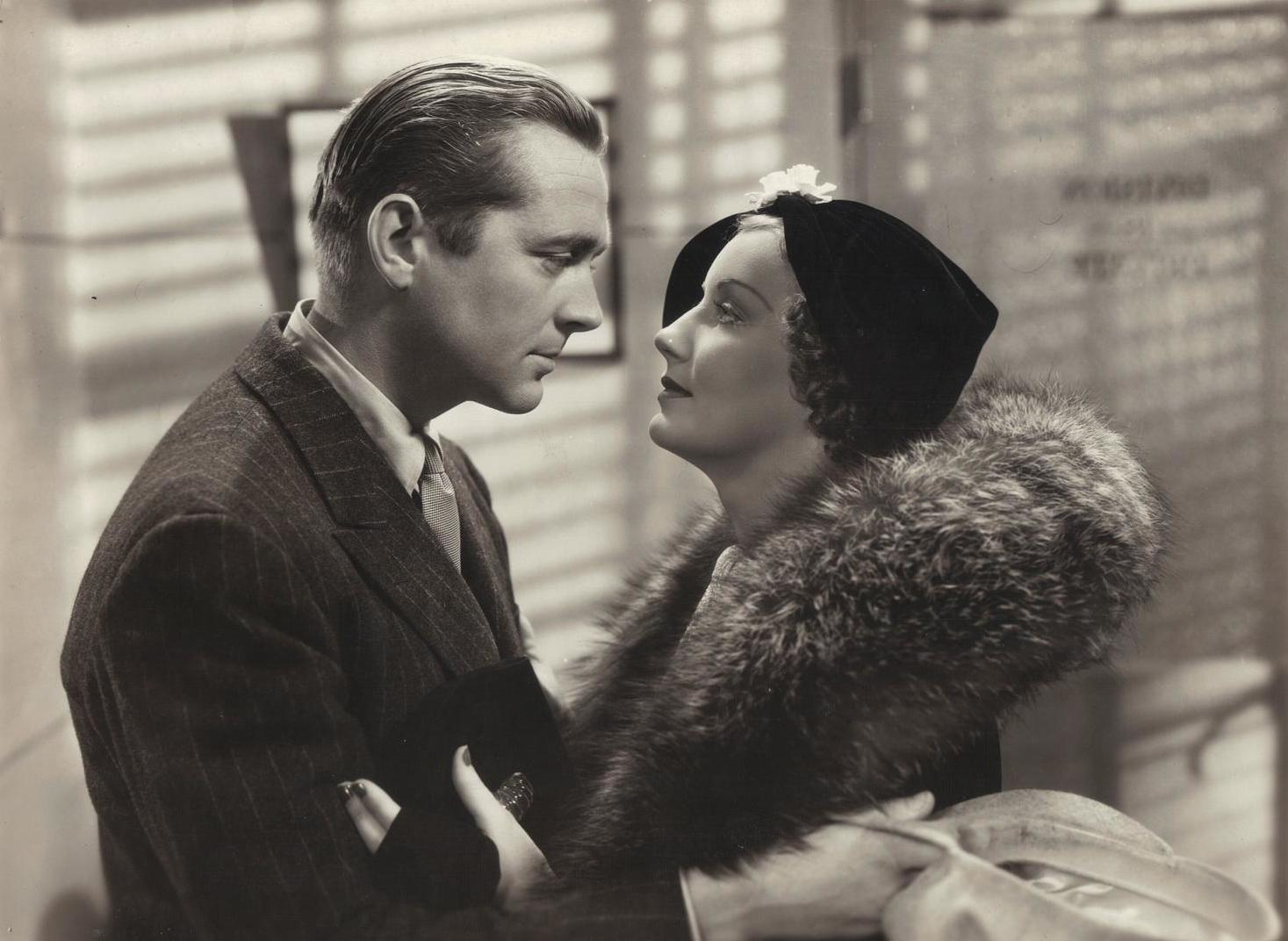
Allen and James Dunn in Bright Eyes (1934)

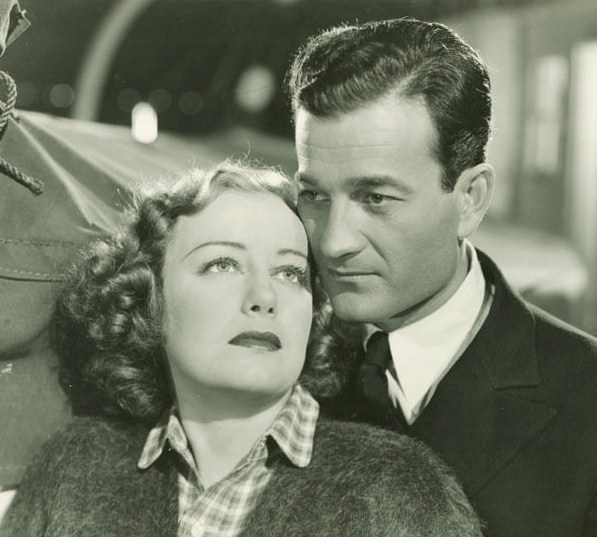
Allen and Milburn Stone in The Port of Missing Girls (1938)

Using the name Mari Colman, Allen worked as a commercial model in New York for the Walter Thornton Modeling Agency. That was where she was selected for a leading role in the film This Day and Age (1933). The role led to her name change to Judith Allen. Robert S. Birchard wrote about the process in his book, Cecil B. DeMille's Hollywood, comparing it to "a comic sequence in David O. Selznick's 1937 production of A Star Is Born."

Birchard related: "Mari Colman was subjected to the same treatment as DeMille, and Paramount tested long lists of potential screen names.... Somehow, the name ultimately bestowed upon her was Judith Allen."

== Personal life ==
Allen married wrestler Gus Sonnenberg in 1931 in New York City. They divorced on September 23, 1933, in Reno, Nevada. She married Irish boxer, professional wrestler, actor, and a tenor Jack Doyle on April 28, 1935, in Agua Caliente, Mexico. She filed for divorce or annulment of the marriage but also was quoted saying she hoped for reconciliation. She filed a $2 million suit against the Dodge heiress she said was trying to steal Doyle away.

== Filmography ==
- The Thundering Herd (1933)
- Too Much Harmony (1933)
- This Day and Age (1933)
- Hell and High Water (1933)
- Dancing Man (1934)
- She Loves Me Not (1934)
- Young and Beautiful (1934)
- Men of the Night (1934)
- Night Alarm (1934)
- The Witching Hour (1934)
- Marrying Widows (1934)
- The Old Fashioned Way (1934)
- Bright Eyes (1934)
- Behind the Green Lights (1935)
- The Healer (1935)
- Reckless Roads (1935)
- Burning Gold (1936)
- Beware of Ladies (1936)
- Git Along Little Dogies (1937)
- It Happened Out West (1937)
- Boots and Saddles (1937)
- Bill Cracks Down (1937)
- Navy Spy (1937)
- Texas Trail (1937)
- Telephone Operator (1937)
- Tough Kid (1938)
- The Port of Missing Girls (1938)
- Four Girls in White (1939)
- The Women (1939)
- Framed (1940)
- Sky Murder (1940)
- I Shot Billy the Kid (1950)
- Train to Tombstone (1950)

== Bibliography ==
- Bradley, Edwin M. (August 11, 2004). The First Hollywood Musicals: A Critical Filmography of 171 Features, 1927 through 1932. Jefferson, NC: McFarland. ISBN 978-0-7864-2029-2.
