= Men of the Night (1934 film) =

1934 film directed by Lambert Hillyer

- Directed by: Lambert Hillyer
- Written by: Lambert Hillyer
- Produced by: Irving Briskin
- Starring: Bruce Cabot; Judith Allen; Ward Bond
- Cinematography: Henry Freulich
- Edited by: Al Clark
- Production company: Columbia Pictures
- Release date: November 26, 1934 (US)
- Running time: 62 minutes
- Country: United States
- Language: English

Men of the Night is a 1934 American drama film written and directed by Lambert Hillyer, which stars Bruce Cabot, Judith Allen, and Ward Bond.

== Plot ==
Sergeant Detective Kelly and his partner, Inspector John Connors, have earned the hostility of the criminal underworld through their effectiveness in combating crime. A gang of jewel thieves begins attacking women in public places, and Kelly is assigned to bring them to justice. While conducting surveillance, Kelly is warned by Mary Higgins, an employee at the drive-in restaurant being watched, that the gang has noticed him.

Kelly becomes attracted to Mary and begins dating her but later suspects that she is working with the gang. To prove her innocence, Mary takes a job at the café used as the gang's headquarters.

== Cast ==
- Bruce Cabot as Detective Sergeant "Stake-Out" Kelly
- Judith Allen as Mary Higgins
- Ward Bond as Detective John Connors
- Charles Sabin as Packey Davis
- John Kelly as Chuck
- Arthur Rankin as Pat Smith
- Matthew Betz as Schmidt
- Walter McGrail as Louie
- Maidel Turner as Mrs. Webley
- Charles C. Wilson as Benson
- Frank Darien as Mr. Webley
- Harry Holman as Fat man at pig stand
- James Wang as Owner of the chop suey parlor
- Al Hill as Holdup man
- Louis Natheaux as Holdup man
- Eddie Foster as Pedro
- Frank Marlowe as Gas station attendant
- Gladys Gale as Mrs. Everett
- Robert Graves as Mr. Everett
- Pearl Eaton as Ethel
- Frank Meredith as Motorcycle officer
- Jack Mack as Bill
- Tom London as Dave Burns
- Dick Rush as Conductor
- Lucille Ball as Peggy
- Frank O'Connor as Boss painter
- Lee Shumway as Detective
- Mitchell Ingraham as Telegraph operator
- Jack King as Newsboy
- Matty Roubert as Newsboy
- Ernie Adams as Sandy
- Charles McMurphy as Policeman
- Bruce Randall as Policecar driver
- Dutch Hendrian as Henchman
- Herman Marks as Crook
