= Harry Forbes (cinematographer) =

American cinematographer (1888–1939)

- Born: May 4, 1888; Chicago, Illinois
- Died: August 17, 1939 (aged 51); Los Angeles, California, United States
- Occupation: Cinematographer
- Years active: 1915–1939

Harry Forbes was an American cinematographer whose career spanned the silent and sound eras. His first film was 1915's The Victory of Virtue, billed as Harry W. Forbes.

Forbes died on August 17, 1939, shortly after the release of the final film he worked on, Death Goes North.

== Selected filmography ==
- Little Miss Nobody (1917)
- The Little Terror (1917)
- Beggar's Holiday (1934)
- Marrying Widows (1934)
- Million Dollar Haul (1935)
