= Sidney Blackmer =

American actor (1895–1973)

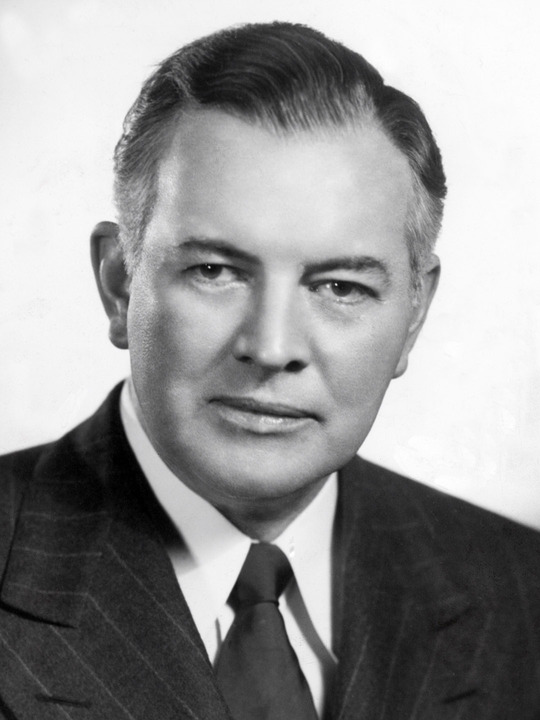
- Blackmer in the 1940s
- Born: Sidney Alderman Blackmer; July 13, 1895; Salisbury, North Carolina, U.S.
- Died: October 6, 1973 (aged 78); New York City, U.S.
- Other name: S.A. Blackmer
- Occupation: Actor
- Years active: 1914-1971
- Spouses: Lenore Ulric (m. 1928; div. 1939) Suzanne Kaaren (m. 1943)
- Children: 2
- Awards: North Carolina Award, Fine Arts

Sidney Alderman Blackmer (July 13, 1895 – October 6, 1973) was an American stage and film actor active from 1914 to 1971, usually in supporting roles.

== Biography ==
Blackmer was born and raised in Salisbury, North Carolina, the son of Clara Deroulhac (née Alderman) and Walter Steele Blackmer. He started in the insurance and financial counseling business but abandoned it. While working as a construction laborer on a new building, he saw a Pearl White serial being filmed and immediately decided to pursue acting as a career. He attended the University of North Carolina at Chapel Hill. Blackmer had a role in the highly popular serial The Perils of Pauline (1914), his film debut.

In 1929, he returned to motion pictures and appeared in more than 120 films.

He won the 1950 Tony Award for Best Actor (Drama) for his role in the Broadway play Come Back, Little Sheba, co-starring with Shirley Booth.

In film, Blackmer had a role as the conniving Manhattan warlock Roman Castevet in the guise of one of many overly solicitous elderly neighbors in Roman Polanski's film Rosemary's Baby.

Blackmer also appeared in television roles, such as the "Don't Come Back Alive" episode of the 1955 TV series Alfred Hitchcock Presents and "The Premature Burial" episode of the 1961 TV series Thriller. Blackmer also guest-starred twice in the western TV series Bonanza in the episodes "The Dream Riders" (1961) and "The Late Ben Cartwright" (1968). Among his notable roles was the character of presidential candidate William Lyons Selby in the Outer Limits episode "The Hundred Days of the Dragon".

A humanitarian, Blackmer served as the national vice president of the United States Muscular Dystrophy Association. He also helped found the North Carolina School of the Arts. In 1972, he was honored with the North Carolina Award in the Fine Arts category, the State of North Carolina's highest civilian award. On his death in 1973, Blackmer was interred in the Chestnut Hill Cemetery in his hometown.

== Legacy ==
For his contributions to the film industry, Blackmer has a motion pictures star on the Hollywood Walk of Fame at 1625 Vine Street.

== Filmography ==
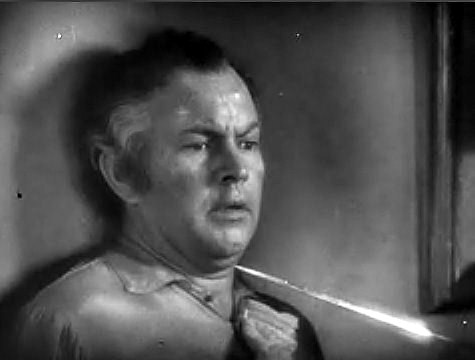
- Blackmer in the trailer for the 1934 film The Count of Monte Cristo

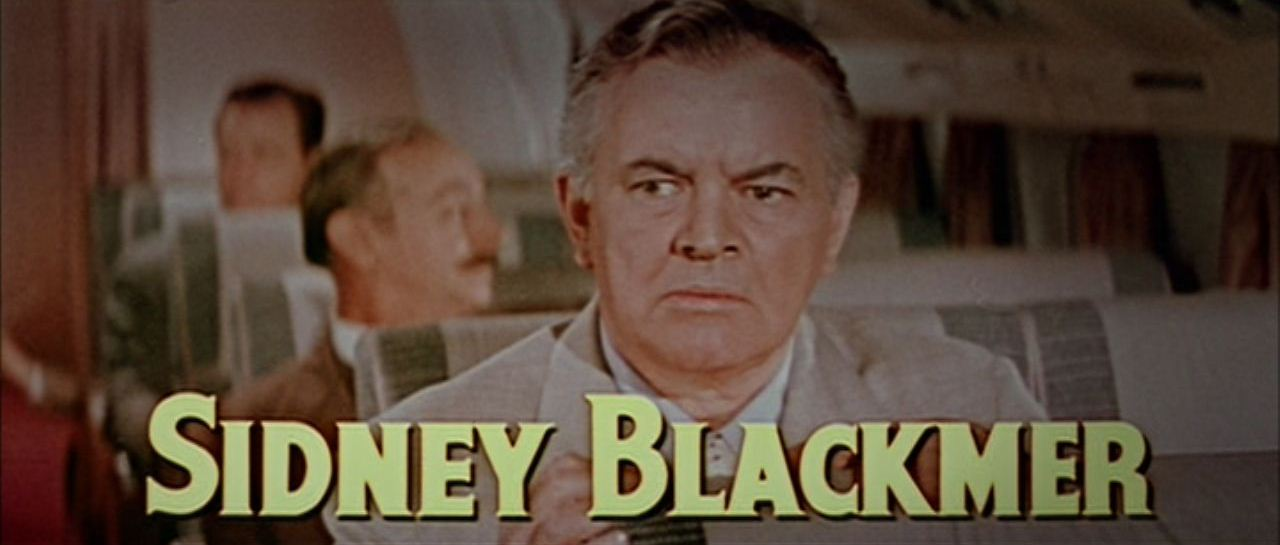
Blackmer in The High and the Mighty (1954)

- Beating Back (1914)
- A Most Immoral Lady (1929) as Humphrey Sergeant
- The Love Racket (1929) as Fred Masters
- Strictly Modern (1930) as Heath Desmond
- Sweethearts and Wives (1930) as Anthony Peel
- The Bad Man (1930) as Morgan Pell
- Kismet (1930) as Wazir Mansur
- Mothers Cry (1930) as Mr. Gerald Hart
- Little Caesar (1931) as Big Boy
- Woman Hungry (1931) as Geoffrey Brand
- It's a Wise Child (1931) as Steve
- The Lady Who Dared (1931) as Charles Townsend
- From Hell to Heaven (1933) as Cliff Billings
- Cocktail Hour (1933) as William Lawton
- The Wrecker (1933) as Tom Cummings
- Deluge (1933) as Martin Webster
- Goodbye Love (1933) as Chester Hamilton
- This Man Is Mine (1934) as Mort Holmes
- The Count of Monte Cristo (1934) as Mondego
- Down to Their Last Yacht (1934) as Barry Forbes
- Transatlantic Merry-Go-Round (1934) as Lee Lother
- The President Vanishes (1934) as D.L. Voorman
- A Notorious Gentleman (1935) as Clayton Bradford
- The Little Colonel (1935) as Swazey
- Behind the Green Lights (1935) as Raymond Cortell
- Great God Gold (1935) as John Hart
- The Girl Who Came Back (1935) as Bill Rhodes
- Shadows of the Orient (1935) as King Moss
- Smart Girl (1935) as Harry Courtland
- Streamline Express (1935) as Gilbert Landon
- False Pretenses (1935) as Kenneth Alden
- The Fire Trap (1935) as Cedric McIntyre
- Forced Landing (1935) as Tony Bernardi
- Heart of the West (1936) as John Trumbull
- Woman Trap (1936) as Riley Ferguson
- Florida Special (1936) as Jack Macklyn
- Early to Bed (1936) as Rex Daniels
- Missing Girls (1936) as Dan Collins
- The President's Mystery (1936) as George Sartos
- House of Secrets (1936) as Tom Starr
- Girl Overboard (1937) as Alex LeMaire
- A Doctor's Diary (1937) as Dr. Anson Ludlow
- John Meade's Woman (1937) as Rodney
- Michael O'Halloran (1937) as Jim Mintum
- This Is My Affair (1937) as Theodore Roosevelt
- The Women Men Marry (1937) as Walter Wiley
- Wife, Doctor and Nurse (1937) as Dr. Therberg
- Heidi (1937) as Sesemann
- The Last Gangster (1937) as Editor
- Charlie Chan at Monte Carlo (1937) as Victor Karnoff
- Thank You, Mr. Moto (1937) as Herr Eric Koerger
- In Old Chicago (1937) as General Phil Sheridan
- Speed to Burn (1938) as Hastings
- Straight, Place and Show (1938) as 'Lucky' Braddock
- Down on the Farm (1938) as Political Boss (uncredited)
- Suez (1938) as Marquis Du Brey
- Sharpshooters (1938) as Baron Orloff
- Orphans of the Street (1938) as Parker
- While New York Sleeps (1938) as Ralph Simmons
- Trade Winds (1938) as Thomas Bruhme II
- Convict's Code (1939) as Gregory Warren
- Fast and Loose (1939) as 'Lucky' Nolan
- Within the Law (1939) as George Demarest
- It's a Wonderful World (1939) as Al Mallon
- Unmarried (1939) as Cash Enright
- Trapped in the Sky (1939) as Mann
- Hotel for Women (1939) as McNeil
- The Monroe Doctrine (1939) as Theodore Roosevelt
- Law of the Pampas (1939) as Ralph Merritt
- Framed (1940) as Tony Bowman
- Teddy, the Rough Rider (1940) as Theodore Roosevelt
- Maryland (1940) as Spencer Danfield
- Dance, Girl, Dance (1940) as Puss in Boots
- I Want a Divorce (1940) as Erskine Brandon
- Third Finger, Left Hand (1940) as Hughie Wheeler
- Cheers for Miss Bishop (1941) as John Stevens
- Murder Among Friends (1941) as Mr. Wheeler
- The Great Swindle (1941) as Dave Lennox
- Rookies on Parade (1941) as Augustus Moody
- Love Crazy (1941) as George Renny
- Angels with Broken Wings (1941) as Guy Barton
- Ellery Queen and the Perfect Crime (1941) as Anthony Rhodes
- The Feminine Touch (1941) as Freddie Bond
- The Officer and the Lady (1941) as Blake Standish
- Down Mexico Way (1941) as Ellery Gibson
- Nazi Agent (1942) as Arnold Milbar
- Obliging Young Lady (1942) as Henry, George's Attorney
- Always in My Heart (1942) as Philip Ames
- The Panther's Claw (1942) as Police Commissioner Thatcher Colt
- Gallant Lady (1942) as Steve Carey
- Sabotage Squad (1942) as Carlyle Harrison
- Quiet Please, Murder (1942) as Martin Cleaver
- Murder in Times Square (1943) as George Nevins
- I Escaped from the Gestapo (1943) as Bergen
- In Old Oklahoma (1943) as Teddy Roosevelt
- Broadway Rhythm (1944) as Press Agent (uncredited)
- Buffalo Bill (1944) as Theodore Roosevelt (uncredited)
- The Lady and the Monster (1944) as Eugene Fulton
- Wilson (1944) as Josephus Daniels
- Duel in the Sun (1946) as The Lover
- My Girl Tisa (1948) as Theodore Roosevelt
- A Song Is Born (1948) as Adams
- People Will Talk (1951) as Arthur Higgins
- Saturday's Hero (1951) as T. C. McCabe
- The San Francisco Story (1952) as Andrew Cain
- Washington Story (1952) as Philip Emery
- The High and the Mighty (1954) as Humphrey Agnew
- Johnny Dark (1954) as James Fielding
- Alfred Hitchcock Presents (1955, Season 1 Episode 4: "Don't Come Back Alive") as Frank Partridge
- The View from Pompey's Head (1955) as Garvin Wales
- High Society (1956) as Seth Lord
- Beyond a Reasonable Doubt (1956) as Austin Spencer
- Accused of Murder (1956) as Frank Hobart
- Tammy and the Bachelor (1957) as Professor Brent
- Alfred Hitchcock Presents (1962, Season 7 Episode 17: "The Faith of Aaron Menefee") as Reverend Otis Jones
- How to Murder Your Wife (1965) as Judge Blackstone
- Joy in the Morning (1965) as Dean James Darwent
- A Covenant with Death (1967) as Colonel Oates
- Rosemary's Baby (1968) as Roman Castevet
- Revenge Is My Destiny (1971) as Gregory Mann
