= Beggar's Holiday (film) =

1934 film

- Directed by: Sam Newfield
- Written by: Adele Buffington
- Produced by: Sigmund Neufeld
- Starring: Hardie Albright; J. Farrell MacDonald; Sally O'Neil
- Cinematography: Harry Forbes
- Production company: Tower Productions
- Distributed by: Capitol Film Exchange
- Release date: June 13, 1934
- Running time: 60 minutes
- Country: United States
- Language: English

Beggar's Holiday is a 1934 American drama film directed by Sam Newfield and starring Hardie Albright, J. Farrell MacDonald and Sally O'Neil. It was produced on Poverty Row as a second feature. Scenes were shot at the Talisman Studios. In Britain it was distributed by Universal Pictures.

== Plot ==
The daughter of a tug boat captain loses her job as a taxi dancer. Struggling she meets and falls in love with him, unwittingly knowing that he has been charged with embezzlement and is out on bail. He plans to enjoy two weeks fun with her before skipping the country, but unexpectedly finds that he has fallen in love with her too. He confesses his situation to her and stays in America to face the music. Paroled after a year, he goes straight and gets a job at the wharf.

== Cast ==
- Hardie Albright as Dapper Frank Mason aka Bing
- J. Farrell MacDonald as Pop Malloy
- Sally O'Neil as Myrt Malloy
- Barbara Barondess as Flo Evans
- George Grandee as Bill Evans
- William Franklin as Detective
- Louise Beavers as Heliotrope
- James T. Mack as Reverend
- George O'Hanlon as Bellhop

== Bibliography ==
- Pitts, Michael R. Poverty Row Studios, 1929–1940: An Illustrated History of 55 Independent Film Companies, with a Filmography for Each. McFarland & Company, 2005.
