= The Witching Hour (1934 film) =

1934 film

- Directed by: Henry Hathaway
- Written by: Anthony Veiller; Salisbury Field (adaptation)
- Based on: the 1907 play The Witching Hour by Augustus Thomas
- Produced by: Anthony Veiller
- Starring: Sir Guy Standing; John Halliday; Judith Allen; Tom Brown
- Distributed by: Paramount Pictures
- Release date: April 26, 1934
- Running time: 69 minutes
- Country: United States
- Language: English

The Witching Hour is a 1934 American pre-Code drama film directed by Henry Hathaway and starring Sir Guy Standing, John Halliday, Judith Allen and Tom Brown.

== Plot ==
While Jack Brookfield runs a gambling gathering at night in his Kentucky house, his daughter Nancy is frequently visited by and becomes engaged to young Northern architect Clay Thorne. His mother, an old friend of Brookfield's, arrives from Baltimore to save her son from the vice of gambling, but when Brookfield shows her her son and his daughter in the garden, she is delighted. Brookfield announces to the gentlemen that for that evening the gambling is over early, due to a feeling he has.

After everybody has left, Brookfield's old friend (and customer) Lew Ellinger proposes playing poker. Brookfield answers he is not a gambler, but Ellinger deals the cards anyway. To his astonishment, Brookfield tells him exactly what he has in his hand. When it is repeated a second time, Brookfield tells him that he cannot tell what cards he has if Ellinger does not look at them. When this second time he tells again the cards Ellinger has, Ellinger asks Brookfield how he does it. Brookfield does not know, but he does not gamble because of this gift, which saddens Ellinger.

Meantime, the police chief gathers his men to raid Brookfield's house. When they arrive, but they can find no trace of gambling activity.

After Nancy turns in for the night, Clay becomes terrified when he sees a cats-eye ring (collateral put up by Lew) on Brookfield's finger. This causes Brookfield to question Clay's manhood.

Afterward, Brookfield receives a visit from Frank Hardmuth. Hardmuth has a grudge against him and is determined to show that he is the boss of the town. When Hardmuth states he is good enough for Nancy, Brookfield punches him and tells him that one day a man will come in his office and shoot him. Clay overhears him. Brookfield tells him, after Hardmuth leaves, that his fear is absurd. He hypnotizes the young man without realizing it.

Judge Martin Prentice is Brookfield's last visitor that night. Brookfield finds in him an understanding person concerning his gift. Prentice warns him to be more careful about hypnotizing people.

Clay goes to Hardmuth's office and shoots him dead without knowing what he is doing. His loved ones search for a defense attorney, but nobody takes hypnotism seriously or believes it is grounds for a defense. Finally, they think of Judge Prentice, who is retired, but would certainly understand how to manage the case. Prentice does not want to take the case, but the ghost of Margaret Price, Mrs. Thorne's mother and Prentice's love, persuades him to change his mind. The trial goes badly for the defense; even the testimony of Dr. von Strohn, an eminent expert on hypnosis, cannot turn the tide. Finally, in desperation, Prentice has Brookfield hypnotize the openly skeptical jury foreman into shooting the district attorney (the gun has blanks). The jury reaches the verdict "not guilty", and Clay is a free man.

== Cast ==
- Sir Guy Standing as [Judge] Martin Prentice
- John Halliday as Jack Brookfield
- Judith Allen as Nancy Brookfield
- Tom Brown as Clay Thorne
- Olive Tell as Mrs. [Helen] Thorne
- Richard Carle as Lew Ellinger
- Ralf Harolde as Frank Hardmuth
- Purnell Pratt as District Attorney [Robinson]
- Frank Sheridan as Police Chief
- Gertrude Michael as Margaret Price
- Ferdinand Gottschalk as Dr. von Strohn
- William Frawley as Foreman of Jury

== Reception ==
Author and film critic Leonard Maltin awarded the film two and a half out of four stars, calling it "[a] Minor but well-made chiller with eerie atmosphere."
