= Second Fiddle (1923 film) =

1923 American film by Frank Tuttle

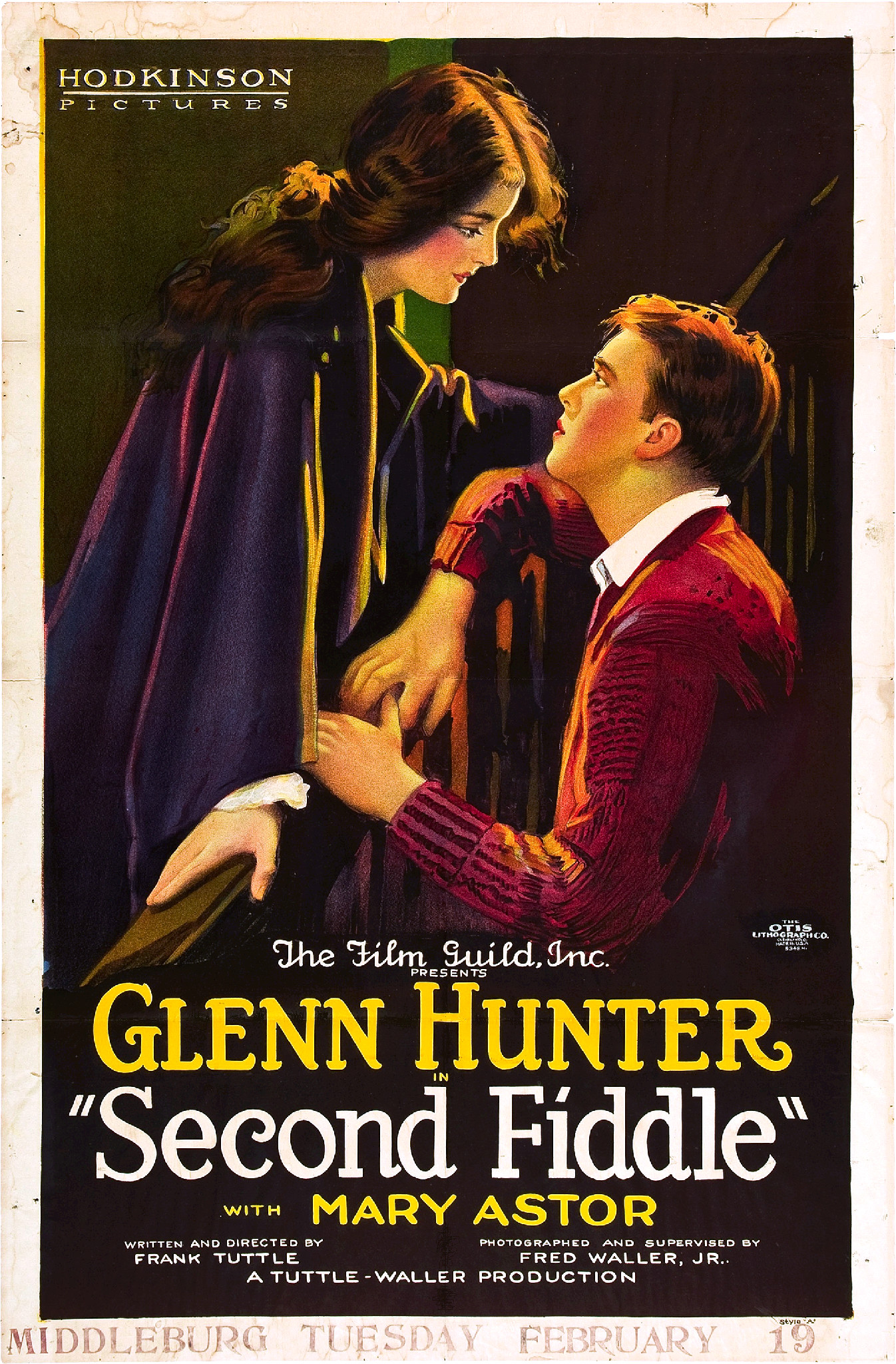
- 1923 theatrical poster
- Directed by: Frank Tuttle
- Story by: James Ashmore Creelman; Frank Tuttle
- Produced by: Fred Waller
- Starring: Glenn Hunter; Mary Astor
- Cinematography: Fred Waller
- Production company: Tuttle Waller-Film Guild
- Distributed by: W. W. Hodkinson Corporation
- Release date: January 14, 1923
- Running time: 6 reels
- Country: United States
- Language: Silent (English intertitles)

Second Fiddle is a 1923 American silent comedy-drama film directed by Frank Tuttle and distributed by W. W. Hodkinson. It stars Glenn Hunter and has an early appearance in a lead role by actress Mary Astor.

== Plot ==
As described in a film magazine, George Bradley (Stowe) and his wife (Foy) are very proud of their eldest son Herbert (Martin), who has just come home from college. He is lionized by his parents as well as by the New England town of Spell's River. Younger brother Jim (Hunter) plays "second fiddle" to the wonderful Herbert. Jim is regulated to the background as Herbert monopolizes Jim's room, his room, and finally his girlfriend Polly Crawford (Astor). Cragg (Nally), a brute, murders his daughter (Adamowska) and comes to the Bradley home at night. Herbert goes for help, leaving Jim alone with an empty gun to protect Polly and Mrs. Bradley. Jim holds Cragg at bay until he faints and is overpowered by Cragg. Herbert returns with help and infers that Jim is a coward. Cragg escapes from jail and goes to his home to get some money. Polly takes refuge there during a storm and is attacked by Cragg. Not knowing that Cragg is there, Herbert enters the house but runs away after being attacked by Cragg, leaving Polly to his mercy. Jim arrives in the nick of time and, after a terrific struggle in which Cragg is killed, saves Polly and proves he is the better man.

== Cast ==
- Glenn Hunter as Jim Bradley
- Mary Astor as Polly Crawford
- Townsend Martin as Herbert Bradley
- William Nally as Cragg
- Leslie Stowe as George Bradley
- Mary Foy as Mrs. Bradley
- Helena Adamowska as Cragg's Daughter
- Otto Lang as Dr. Crawford
- Osgood Perkins

== Preservation ==
A copy of Second Fiddle is in the Stanford Theatre Foundation collection of the UCLA Film & Television Archive.
