= Pinch hitter (disambiguation) =

Pinch hitter is a substitute batter in baseball.

Pinch hitter may also refer to:

- Pinch hitter (cricket), a batsman in cricket promoted up the batting order in order to score quick runs
- Pinchie or one-hitter, a type of pipe for smoking cannabis, tobacco, and other herbs
- The Pinch Hitter (1917 film), a 1917 American film directed by Victor Schertzinger
- The Pinch Hitter (1925 film), a 1925 American silent film sports comedy directed by Joseph Henabery
