= DeWitt Jennings =

American actor (1871–1937)

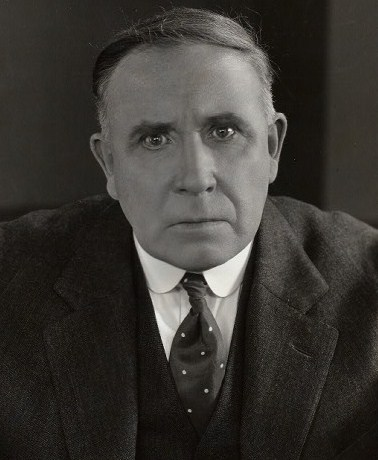
- Jennings circa 1920
- Born: DeWitt Clarke Jennings; June 21, 1871; Cameron, Missouri, US
- Died: March 1, 1937 (aged 65); Hollywood, California, US
- Occupation: Actor
- Years active: 1906–1937

DeWitt Clarke Jennings (June 21, 1871 – March 1, 1937) was an American film and stage actor. He appeared in 17 Broadway plays between 1906 and 1920, and in more than 150 films between 1915 and 1937.

== Biography ==
He was born in Cameron, Missouri on June 21, 1871, to Georgia S. and Oliver A. Jennings. In 1935, Jennings played Sailing Master Fryer in Mutiny on the Bounty with Clark Gable and Charles Laughton. He died in Hollywood, California on March 1, 1937.

== Partial filmography ==
- The Deep Purple (1915) - Gordon Laylock
- The Warrens of Virginia (1915) - Minor Role (uncredited)
- At Bay (1915) - Judson Flagg
- Sporting Blood (1916) - Dave Garrison
- The Little American (1917) - English Barrister
- The Hillcrest Mystery (1918) - Tom Cameron
- Three Sevens (1921) - Samuel Green
- The Greater Claim (1921) - Richard Everard Sr
- The Golden Snare (1921) - 'Fighting' Fitzgerald
- Beating the Game (1921) - G.B. Lawson
- The Invisible Power (1921) - Mark Shadwell
- Alias Ladyfingers (1921) - Lt. Ambrose
- There Are No Villains (1921) - Detective Flint
- The Poverty of Riches (1921) - Lyons
- From the Ground Up (1921) - Mr. Mortimer
- The Right That Failed (1922) - Mr. Talbot
- The Face Between (1922) - The Doctor
- Sherlock Brown (1922) - J.J. Wallace
- Flesh and Blood (1922) - Detective Doyle
- Mixed Faces (1922) - Murray McGuire
- Within the Law (1923) - Inspector Burke
- Out of Luck (1923) - Capt. Bristol
- Circus Days (1923) - Daly
- Blinky (1923) - Colonel 'Raw Meat' Islip
- The Heart Bandit (1924) - Pat O'Connell
- Name the Man (1924) - Dan Collister
- By Divine Right (1924) - Tug Wilson
- The Enemy Sex (1924) - Harrigan Blood
- The Gaiety Girl (1924) - John Kershaw
- Hit and Run (1924) - Joe Burns
- The Desert Outlaw (1924) - Doc McChesney
- Merton of the Movies (1924) - Jeff Baird
- The Silent Watcher (1924) - Stuart, the detective
- Along Came Ruth (1924) - Capt. Miles Standish
- The Deadwood Coach (1924) - Jim Shields - in play
- The Re-Creation of Brian Kent (1925) - Detective Ross
- Go Straight (1925) - The Hunter
- The Mystic (1925) - Director of Police
- Don't (1925) - Mr. Moffat
- The Splendid Road (1925) - Capt. Bashford
- Chip of the Flying U (1926) - J.G. Whitmore
- The Passionate Quest (1926) - Benjamin Stone
- The Ice Flood (1926) - James O'Neill
- Exit Smiling (1926) - Orlando Wainwright
- While London Sleeps (1926) - Inspector Burke
- The Fire Brigade (1926) - Fire Chief Wallace
- McFadden's Flats (1927) - Patrick Halloran
- Great Mail Robbery (1927) - Captain Davis
- Two Arabian Knights (1927) - American Consul
- Home Made (1927) - Mr. White
- The Night Flyer (1928) - Bucks
- Air Mail Pilot (1928) - Robert Ross
- Marry the Girl (1928) - Martin Wayland
- The Crash (1928) - Supt. Carleton
- Me, Gangster (1928)
- Red Hot Speed (1928) - Judge O'Brien
- Naughty Baby (1928) - Terry's Uncle (uncredited)
- Seven Footprints to Satan (1929) - Uncle Joe
- The Trial of Mary Dugan (1929) - Inspector Hunt
- Alibi (1929) - Officer O'Brien (uncredited)
- Thru Different Eyes (1929) - Paducah
- The Valiant (1929) - Warden Holt
- Fox Movietone Follies of 1929 (1929) - Jay Darrell
- Seven Keys to Baldpate (1929) - Mayor Jim Cargan
- New York Nights (1929) - Detective (uncredited)
- Night Ride (1930) - Capt. O'Donnell
- In the Next Room (1930) - Inspector Grady
- Captain of the Guard (1930) - Priest
- Those Who Dance (1930) - Captain O'Brien
- The Big House (1930) - Wallace
- Outside the Law (1930) - Police Chief Kennedy (uncredited)
- Scarlet Pages (1930) - Judge (uncredited)
- The Big Trail (1930) - Boat Captain Hollister (uncredited)
- The Bat Whispers (1930) - Police Captain
- Min and Bill (1930) - Groot
- The Criminal Code (1931) - Captain Gleason
- Primrose Path (1931)- Joe Malone
- The Secret Six (1931) - Chief of Police Donlin
- Salvation Nell (1931) - McGovern
- Politics (1931) - Police Chief (uncredited)
- The Squaw Man (1931) - Sheriff Bud Hardy
- Caught Plastered (1931) - Police Chief H.A. Morton
- A Dangerous Affair (1931) - City Editor
- The Deceiver (1931) - Inspector Dunn
- Arrowsmith (1931) - Mr. B.W. Tozer (uncredited)
- Dancers in the Dark (1932) - Police Sergeant McGroody
- Night Court (1932) - Court Policeman (uncredited)
- By Whose Hand? (1932) - City Editor (uncredited)
- The Washington Masquerade (1932) - Senate Board of Inquiry Member (uncredited)
- Midnight Morals (1932) - Dan McKennan
- Movie Crazy (1932) - Mr. Hall
- Speak Easily (1932) - Sheriff of Lincoln County (uncredited)
- Tess of the Storm Country (1932) - Game Warden (uncredited)
- Silver Dollar (1932) - The Mine Foreman
- Central Park (1932) - Police Desk Sergeant Monahan (uncredited)
- The Match King (1932) - Bodensky (uncredited)
- Ladies They Talk About (1933) - Detective Tracy (uncredited)
- Mystery of the Wax Museum (1933) - Police Captain
- Grand Slam (1933) - Private Detective R.J. Flynn (uncredited)
- A Lady's Profession (1933) - Mr. Stephens
- Reform Girl (1933) - Capt. Balfour
- Strictly Personal (1933) - Inspector Flynn
- Song of the Eagle (1933) - Chief of Police / Colonel Hellfire Harry (uncredited)
- Made on Broadway (1933) - Moriarty (uncredited)
- Fighting with Kit Carson (1933) - Army Colonel (Ch. 1) (uncredited)
- One Year Later (1933) - Deputy Russell
- Golden Harvest (1933) - Sheriff (uncredited)
- I Loved a Woman (1933) - Banker (uncredited)
- Police Car 17 (1933) - Captain T. J. Hart
- Day of Reckoning (1933) - First Deputy (uncredited)
- From Headquarters (1933) - Third-Degree Detective (uncredited)
- The Women in His Life (1933) - Warden (uncredited)
- On Your Guard (1933) - Joshua Perkins
- Fugitive Lovers (1934) - Warden (uncredited)
- The Meanest Gal in Town (1934) - Police Chief (uncredited)
- Massacre (1934) - Sheriff Jennings
- She Made Her Bed (1934) - Show Boss (uncredited)
- The Fighting Rookie (1934) - Police Commissioner
- Little Man, What Now? (1934) - Emil Kleinholz
- Operator 13 (1934) - Artilleryman (uncredited)
- A Man's Game (1934) - Chief Jordan
- Charlie Chan's Courage (1934) - Constable Brackett
- The Cat's-Paw (1934) - Pete - Policeman (uncredited)
- Take the Stand (1934) - Police Commissioner
- Death on the Diamond (1934) - Patterson
- The President Vanishes (1934) - Edward Cullen
- Secret of the Chateau (1934) - Louis Bardou
- A Wicked Woman (1934) - The Sheriff
- Murder on a Honeymoon (1935) - Captain Beegle
- A Dog of Flanders (1935) - Carl Cogez
- Mary Jane's Pa (1935) - Sheriff
- Village Tale (1935) - Sheriff Ramsey
- Front Page Woman (1935) - Police Lieutenant (uncredited)
- The Daring Young Man (1935) - Mayor's Committee Official (uncredited)
- The Farmer Takes a Wife (1935) - Freight Agent (uncredited)
- Mutiny on the Bounty (1935) - Fryer
- I Dream Too Much (1935) - Man Yelling for Food (uncredited)
- Exclusive Story (1936) - Captain (uncredited)
- Sins of Man (1936) - Twichelesko
- The Crime of Dr. Forbes (1936) - Judge Benson
- Kelly the Second (1936) - Judge
- Sing, Baby, Sing (1936) - Mr. Lee, the Landlord (uncredited)
- The Accusing Finger (1936) - Prison Warden
- We Who Are About to Die (1937) - Mike Brannigan
- Nancy Steele Is Missing! (1937) - Doctor on Farm
- Midnight Taxi (1937) - Capt. Wainwright (scenes deleted)
- That I May Live (1937) - Chief of Police
- This Is My Affair (1937) - Bradley Wallace
- Fifty Roads to Town (1937) - Captain Galloway
- Slave Ship (1937) - Snodgrass
