= Grit (film) =

1924 film

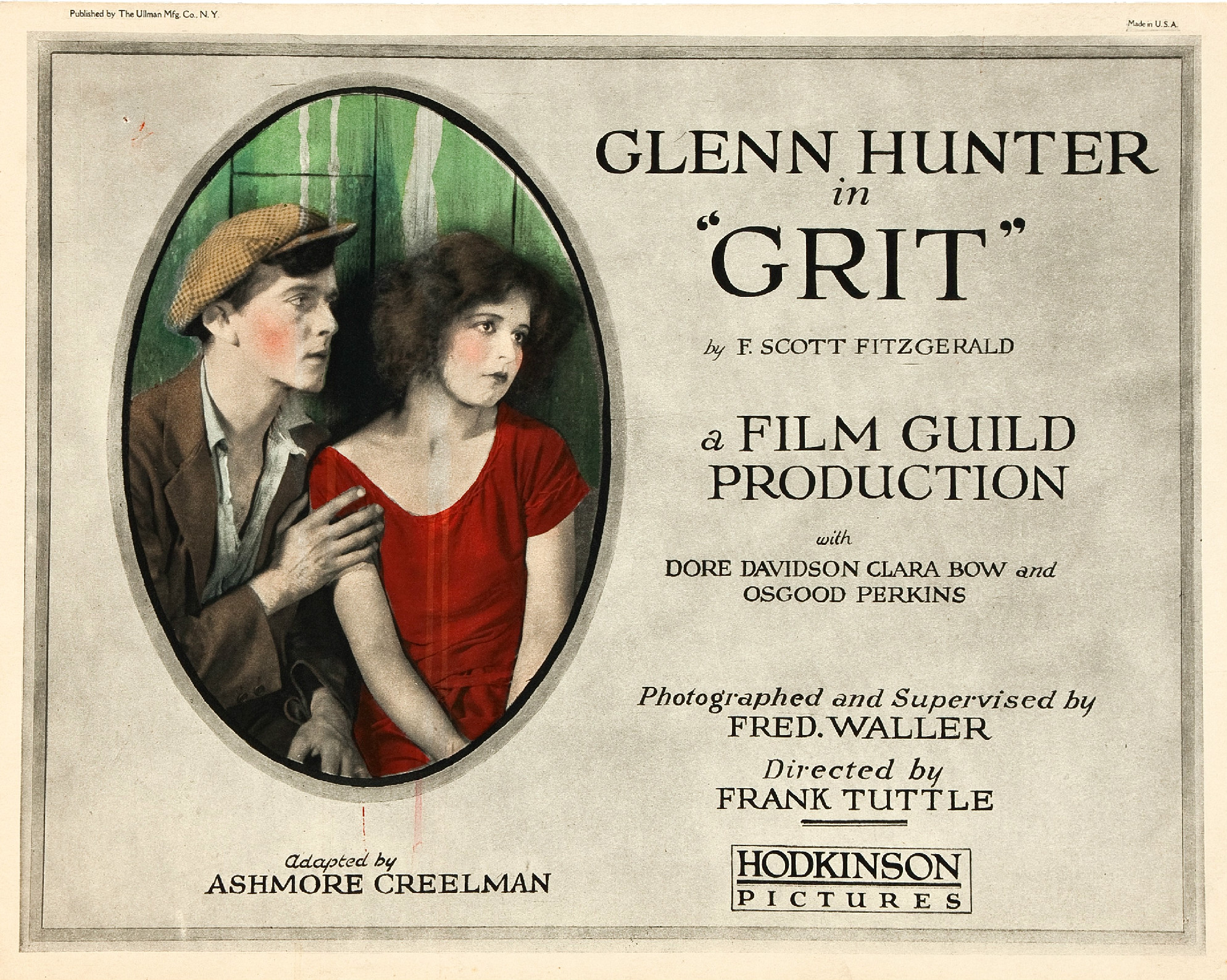
- Lobby card
- Directed by: Frank Tuttle
- Written by: James Ashmore Creelman
- Based on: "Grit" by F. Scott Fitzgerald
- Produced by: Fred Waller
- Starring: Glenn Hunter; Clara Bow; Roland Young
- Cinematography: Fred Waller
- Production company: Film Guild Productions
- Distributed by: Hodkinson Distribution
- Release date: January 7, 1924
- Running time: 60 minutes
- Country: United States
- Language: Silent (English intertitles)

Grit is a 1924 American silent crime drama film directed by Frank Tuttle and starring Glenn Hunter, Clara Bow, and Roland Young. It is based upon a screen story of the same name by F. Scott Fitzgerald.

== Plot ==
As described in a film magazine review, after his father, a reformed gunman, was killed by the gang, Kid Hart is born with fear in his heart, and brought up in the gang. Inspired by his love of Orchid McGonigle, another gang member determined to reform, Kid overcomes his fear at the crucial moment, saves the day, and then marries the young woman.

== Cast ==
- Glenn Hunter as Kid Hart
- Dore Davidson as Pop Finkle
- Clara Bow as Orchid McGonigle
- Osgood Perkins as Boris Giovanni Smith
- Roland Young as Houdini Hart
- Townsend Martin as Flashy Joe
- Helenka Adamowska as Annie Hart
- Martin Borden as Bennie Finkle
- Joseph Depew as Tony O'Cohen

== Preservation ==
With no copies of Grit located in any film archives, it is a lost film.

== Censorship ==
Grit, with its crime drama plot, was banned by the British Board of Film Censors for an undisclosed reason in 1925.

== Bibliography ==
- Munden, Kenneth White. The American Film Institute Catalog of Motion Pictures Produced in the United States, Part 1. University of California Press, 1997.
