= Deadline at Eleven =

1920 film by George Fawcett

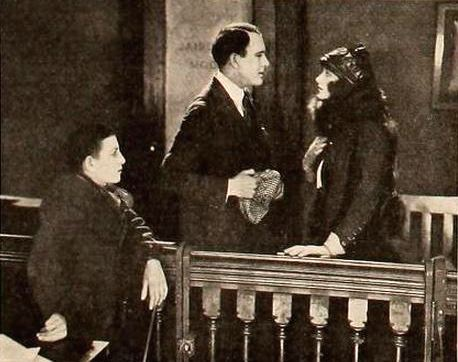
- Directed by: George Fawcett
- Written by: Lucien Hubbard
- Story by: Ruth Byers
- Produced by: Vitagraph Company of America
- Starring: Corinne Griffith
- Cinematography: Arthur Ross
- Distributed by: Vitagraph Company
- Release date: March 15, 1920
- Running time: 5 reels
- Country: United States
- Language: Silent (English intertitles)

Deadline at Eleven is a lost 1920 American silent drama film directed by George Fawcett and starring Corinne Griffith. It was produced by and distributed by the Vitagraph Company of America.

== Cast ==
- Corinne Griffith as Helen Stevens
- Frank M. Thomas as Jack Rawson
- Webster Campbell as Ren Masters
- Alice Calhoun as Carrie Weiss
- Maurice Costello as Paul Klocke
- Dodson Mitchell as Merrill
- James Bradbury Jr. as Jones
- Emily Fitzroy as Mrs. Martha Stevens
- Ernest Lambert as Lord Warburton
