= The Little Giant (1926 film) =

1926 film

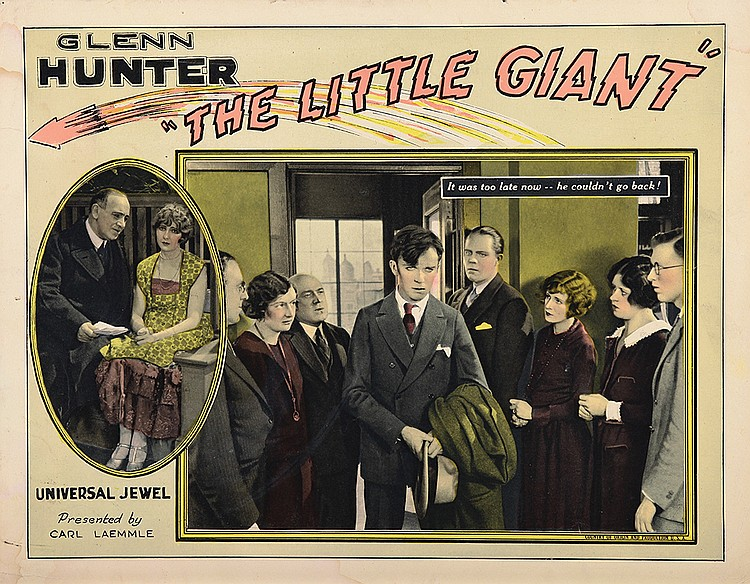
- Lobby card
- Directed by: William Nigh
- Written by: Walter DeLeon
- Based on: Once a Peddler; 1921 in The Saturday Evening Post by Hugh MacNair Kahler
- Produced by: Carl Laemmle
- Starring: Glenn Hunter; Edna Murphy; David Higgins
- Cinematography: Sidney Hickox
- Production company: Universal Pictures
- Distributed by: Universal Pictures
- Release date: January 2, 1926
- Running time: 70 minutes
- Country: United States
- Language: Silent (English intertitles)

The Little Giant is a 1926 American silent comedy film directed by William Nigh and starring Glenn Hunter, Edna Murphy, and David Higgins. A print of The Little Giant exists in the Library of Congress film archive.

== Plot ==
As described in a film magazine review, Elmer Clinton, raised by his Uncle Clem, an old peddler, is made the sales manager of a big washing machine company. He becomes full of an undue sense of his own cleverness, and those around him pander to this self-conceit with flattery. Royce Enfield, the son of the company's owner, plots to ruin him, and all the marketing campaigns are failures. Elmer and his wife Myra do not live within their means and quarrel. Clem sells several washing machines quietly on the side. Elmer discovers that Royce has been double-crossing him and whips him in a fight. Elmer gets rid of the parasitic crowd that had been flattering him, begins marketing and driving up sales based on what Clem had taught him, and is reconciled with his wife.

== Cast ==
- Glenn Hunter as Elmer Clinton
- Edna Murphy as Myra Clinton
- David Higgins as Uncle Clem
- James Bradbury Jr. as Brad
- Jean Jarvis as Olga
- Leonard Meeker as Royce Enfield
- Louise Mackintosh as Mrs. Dansey
- Tom McGuire as Mr. Dansey
- Dodson Mitchell as Mr. Enfield
- Peter Raymond as Dr. Porter

== Bibliography ==
- Munden, Kenneth White. The American Film Institute Catalog of Motion Pictures Produced in the United States, Part 1. University of California Press, 1997.
