= Road to Paradise (film) =

1930 film

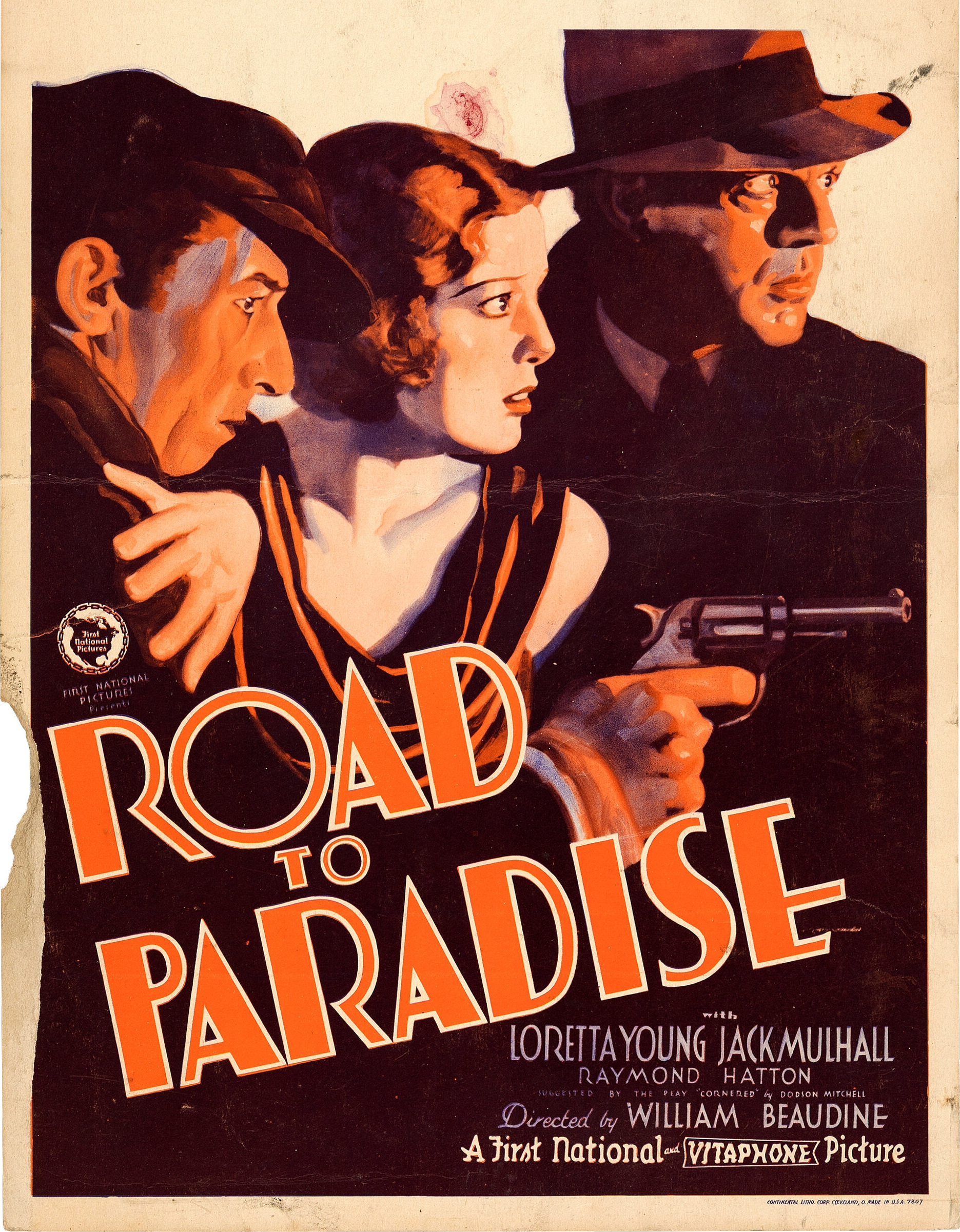
- Directed by: William Beaudine
- Written by: F. Hugh Herbert
- Based on: Cornered; 1920 play by Dodson Mitchell; Zelda Sears
- Starring: Loretta Young; Jack Mulhall; Raymond Hatton
- Cinematography: John F. Seitz
- Edited by: Edward Schroeder
- Music by: Leo F. Forbstein
- Production company: First National Pictures
- Distributed by: First National Pictures
- Release date: July 20, 1930
- Running time: 74 minutes
- Country: United States
- Language: English

Road to Paradise is a 1930 American pre-Code drama film produced and distributed by First National Pictures, and starring Loretta Young, Jack Mulhall and Raymond Hatton. It was directed by William Beaudine and is based on a 1920 play Dodson Mitchell by Zelda Sears called Cornered. The film was a remake of a 1924 silent version, entitled Cornered, which was also directed by William Beaudine.

== Plot ==
Road to Paradise (1930)

Loretta Young plays the part of an orphan named Mary Brennan, who has been raised by two thieves and does not know that she has a twin sister who is now a wealthy socialite. One day, while she is dining at a Chinese restaurant with her two guardians, they notice the wealthy socialite and are taken aback at how closely she resembles Brennan. Hatton and Barraud convince Brennan that she should impersonate the socialite so that they can enter her house and steal the contents of her safe. Brennan enters the house and meets George Wells, who senses something different about Waring and immediately falls in love with her. When night falls, Brennan lets Hatton and Barraud into the house and they attempt to open the safe. Waring happens to enter the house and is shocked to find a woman that looks like her. She is shot at by Barraud, Brennan stays behind to care for Waring but tricks the police into thinking that Waring is the imposter and thief. Even though Wells knows the truth, he keeps quiet because he is in love with her. Eventually Brennan discovers that Waring is her twin sister when they discover that they have matching lockets, the charges are dropped and Brennan accepts Wells' proposal of marriage.

== Cast ==
- Loretta Young as Mary Brennan/Margaret Waring
- Jack Mulhall as George Wells
- Raymond Hatton as Nick
- George Barraud as Jerry "The Gent"
- Kathlyn Williams as Mrs. Wells
- Fred Kelsey as Police Inspector Casey
- Purnell Pratt as Police Inspector Updike
- Ben Hendricks Jr. as Flanagan
- Dot Farley as Lola
- Winter Hall as Brewster, the butler
- Bess Flowers as Nurse
- Clarence Geldart as Doctor
- Tom Wilson as Jerry the Greek
- Wong Chung as Waiter
- Jim Farley as Police Officer Farley

== Preservation status ==
The film survives intact has been shown on television and cable. Road to Paradise has been preserved at the Library of Congress.

== Home media ==
The film is available on DVD from the Warner Archive Collection as a double bill with another Loretta Young film Week-End Marriage.
