= The Untamed Lady =

1926 film

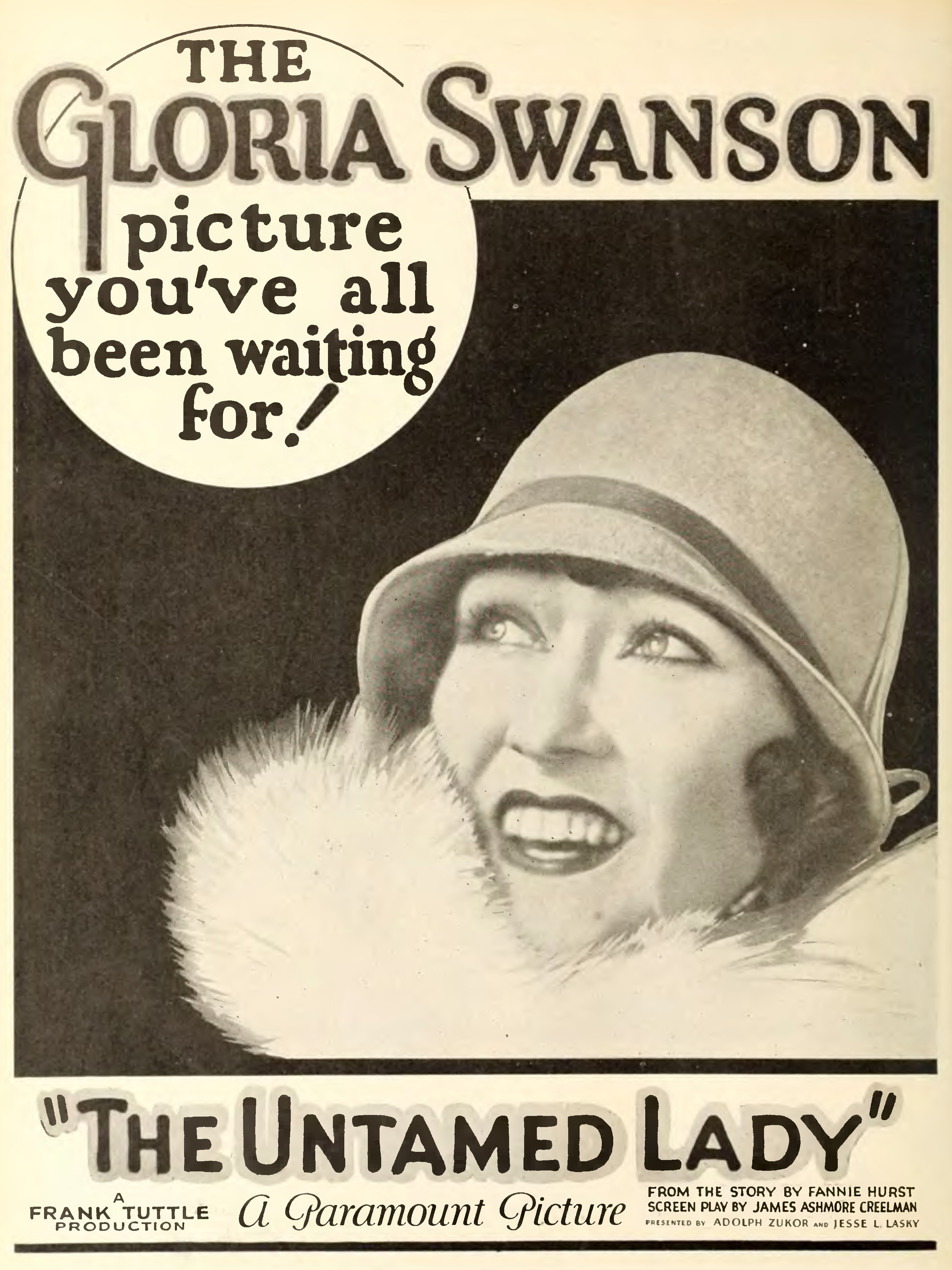
- Advertisement
- Directed by: Frank Tuttle
- Written by: James Ashmore Creelman
- Story by: Fannie Hurst
- Starring: Gloria Swanson; Lawrence Gray
- Cinematography: Frank Webber
- Production company: Famous Players–Lasky
- Distributed by: Paramount Pictures
- Release date: March 22, 1926
- Running time: 70 minutes
- Country: United States
- Language: Silent (English intertitles)

The Untamed Lady is a 1926 American silent drama film directed by Frank Tuttle, and starring Gloria Swanson and Lawrence Gray. The film was also the debut of Nancy Kelly who was a child actress at the time. The film was written by James Ashmore Creelman from an original story by Fannie Hurst.

== Plot ==
As described in a film magazine review, St. Clair Van Tassel, a wealthy orphan who as a child had her every wish granted, develops into a beautiful but extremely bad tempered young woman who is wooed by many and loved by at least one. She breaks engagements with three men, but meets a different type of man in the fourth. When she attempts to break her engagement with him, he holds her captive in a cabin. She escapes, and, in pursuing her, the man is hurt. She goes to the hospital to see him, and there she becomes aware that her love for him has overcome her blazing temper.

== Cast ==
- Gloria Swanson as St. Clair Van Tassel
- Lawrence Gray as Larry Gastlen
- Joseph W. Smiley as Uncle George
- Charles E. Graham as Shorty
- Nancy Kelly in an undetermined role
- Thomas Holding
- Anita Louise

== Preservation ==
With no prints of The Untamed Lady located in any film archives, it is a lost film.
