= The Pinch Hitter (1917 film) =

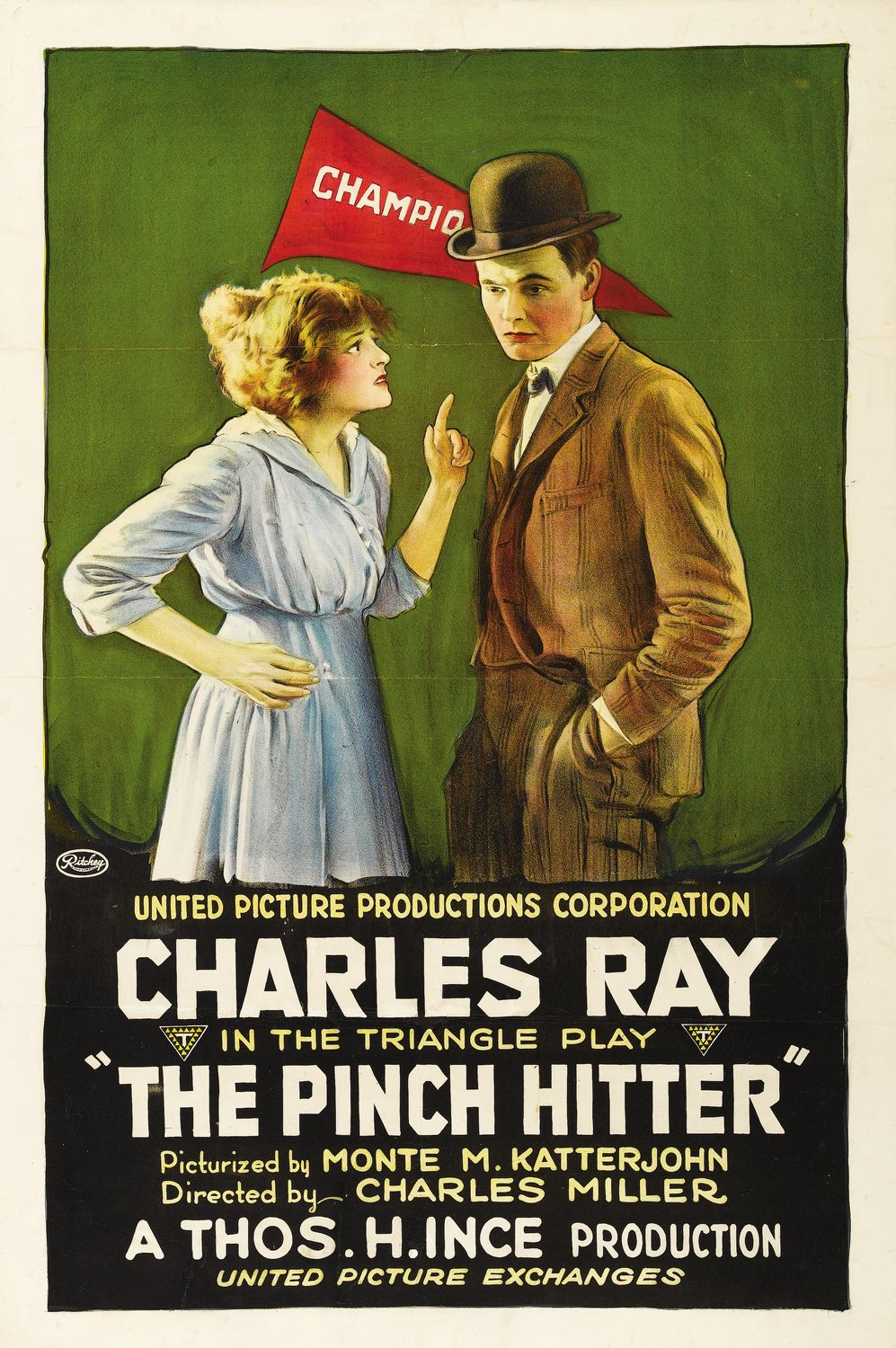
- Film poster
- Directed by: Victor Schertzinger
- Written by: C. Gardner Sullivan
- Produced by: Thomas H. Ince
- Starring: Charles Ray
- Cinematography: Paul Eagler
- Music by: Victor Schertzinger
- Distributed by: Triangle Film Corporation
- Release date: April 29, 1917
- Running time: 5 reels
- Country: United States
- Language: Silent (English intertitles)

The Pinch Hitter is a 1917 American silent comedy drama film directed by Victor Schertzinger and starring Charles Ray. It was produced by Thomas H. Ince and released by Triangle Film Corporation.

The film was remade in 1925 starring Glenn Hunter under the same name.

== Cast ==
- Charles Ray as Joel Parker
- Sylvia Breamer as Abbie Nettleton
- Joseph J. Dowling as Obediah Parker
- Jerome Storm as Jimmie Slater
- Darrel Foss as Alexis Thompson
- Louis Durham as Coach Nolan

== Production ==
The Pinch Hitter was filmed over the course of three weeks, and some scenes required 600 extras.

== Preservation status ==
The George Eastman Museum, the Library of Congress, and the UCLA Film & Television Archive hold copies of the film.
