= The Silent Watcher =

1924 silent film by Frank Lloyd

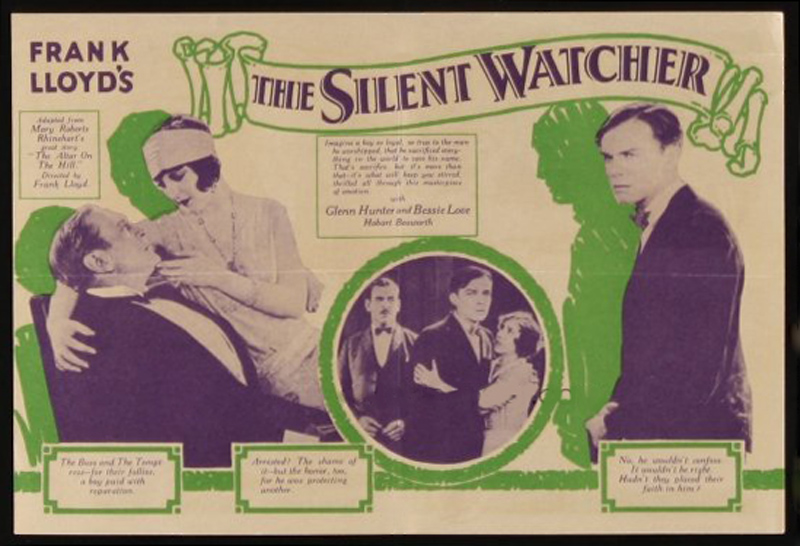
- Film programme
- Directed by: Frank Lloyd
- Written by: J. G. Hawks
- Based on: "The Altar on the Hill" (story) by Mary Roberts Rinehart
- Starring: Glenn Hunter; Bessie Love
- Cinematography: Norbert Brodine
- Edited by: Edward M. Roskam
- Production companies: Frank Lloyd Productions; First National
- Distributed by: First National Pictures
- Release date: October 5, 1924 (U.S.)
- Running time: 8 reels
- Country: United States
- Language: Silent (English intertitles)

The Silent Watcher is a lost 1924 American silent melodrama film directed by Frank Lloyd. It stars Glenn Hunter and Bessie Love. It was produced by Frank Lloyd Productions/First National and distributed by First National Pictures. It was based on the story "The Altar on the Hill" by Mary Roberts Rinehart.

== Plot ==
John Steele, a lawyer running for Congress, breaks up with Lily Elliott, a showgirl, to improve his campaign image. He goes to the apartment his secretary Joe Roberts rented for him to end things with Elliott. Shortly after, she kills herself. Police who oppose Steele treat her death as a murder case.

To protect Steele, Joe claims the apartment and relationship were his and is arrested. Joe's wife, Mary Roberts, is devastated by the arrest. Joe can't explain he rented the apartment for Steele without exposing his employer, so Mary leaves him. Steele's campaign manager keeps the truth from her to protect the campaign.

After Elliott's death is ruled a suicide, Joe is released but finds Mary gone. Weakened by jail fever (Note: A historical term for typhus or illness contracted from unsanitary jail conditions.) and police brutality, he decides to kill himself. Before doing so, he puts on an apron and cleans the house, washing dishes and setting out milk. Mary returns and interrupts him. Steele wins the election and reconciles the couple by telling Mary the truth.

== Cast ==
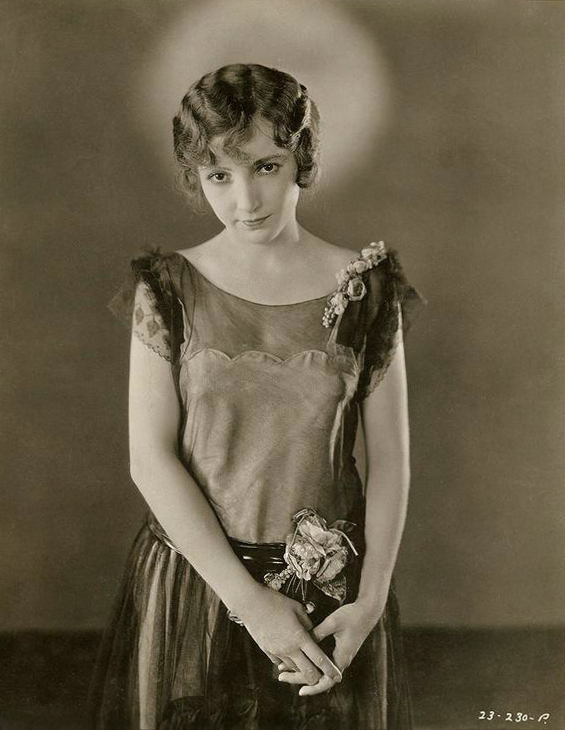
Love as Mary Roberts

- Glenn Hunter as Joe Roberts
- Bessie Love as Mary Roberts
- Hobart Bosworth as Senator John Steele
- Alma Bennett as Lily Elliott, a showgirl
- Gertrude Astor as Mrs. Steele
- George Nichols as Jim Tufts
- Aggie Herring as Mrs. Tufts
- Lionel Belmore as Barnes
- DeWitt Jennings as Detective Stuart
- Brandon Hurst as Reporter Herrold

== Release and reception ==
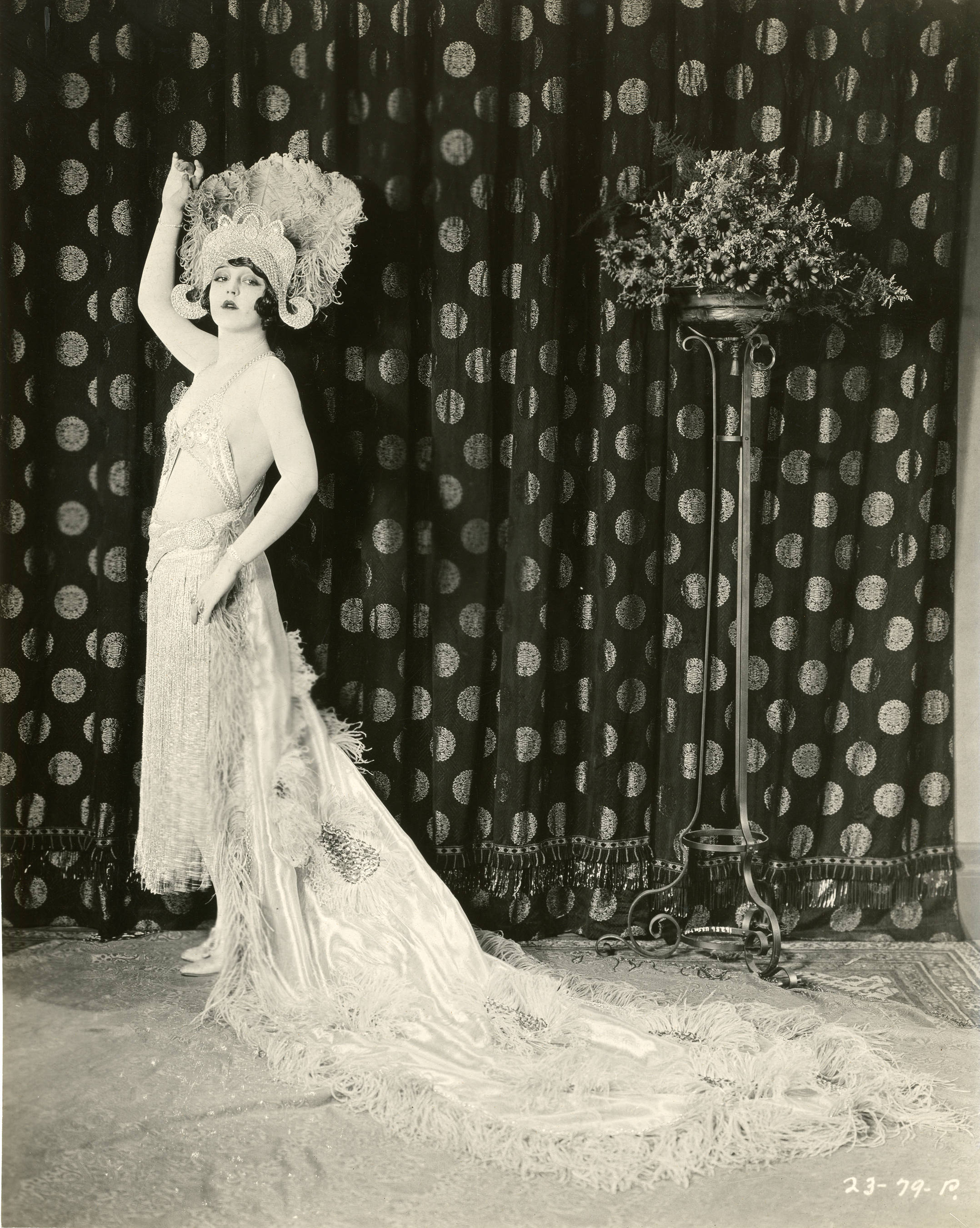
Bennett as showgirl Lily

Stills of Alma Bennett's dance number featured prominently in the promotion of the film. On its release, it was shown in some theaters with the Mack Sennett comedy The Wild Goose Chaser, as well as The Color World. Other theaters showed the film with the comedy Turn About.

Glenn Hunter and Bessie Love received high praise for their performances, as did the screenplay. Although the film itself was deemed tedious in parts, the overall reviews were overwhelmingly positive.
