= Dodson Mitchell =

- Born: Dodson Lomax Mitchell; January 23, 1868; Memphis, Tennessee
- Died: June 2, 1939 (aged 71); New York City, New York
- Other name: Dobson Mitchell
- Years active: 1899-1937

Dodson Lomax Mitchell (1868-1939) was an American stage and screen actor and author. He was a nephew to actress Maggie Mitchell and cousin of theatre director Julian Mitchell.

== Selected filmography ==
- Are You a Mason? (1915)
- Fifty-Fifty (1916)
- Deadline at Eleven (1920)
- The Little Giant (1926)
- Road to Paradise (1930) (*writer of play)
