= Ferdinand Gottschalk =

English actor

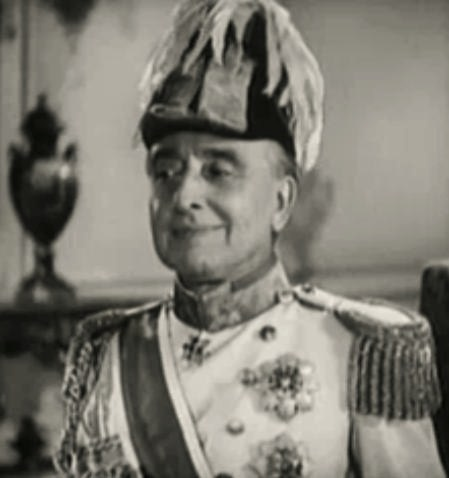
- Gottschalk in King Kelly of the U.S.A., 1934
- Born: 28 February 1858; London, England
- Died: 10 November 1944 (aged 86); London, England
- Occupation: Actor
- Years active: 1917–1938

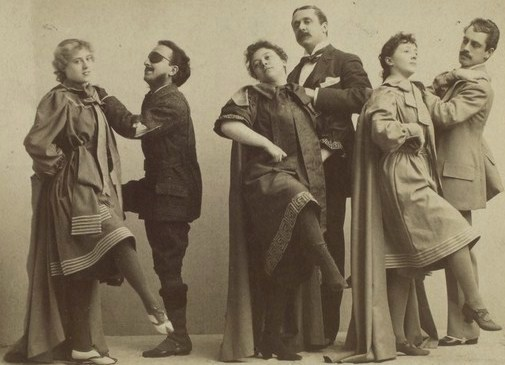
The Amazons 1894: left to right Katherine Florence, Gottschalk, Georgia Cayvan, Herbert Kelcey, Bessie Tyree and Fritz Williams(husband of Katherine Florence).

Ferdinand Gottschalk (28 February 1858 – 10 November 1944) was an English theatre and film actor. He appeared in 76 films between 1917 and 1938. He was born and died in London, England.

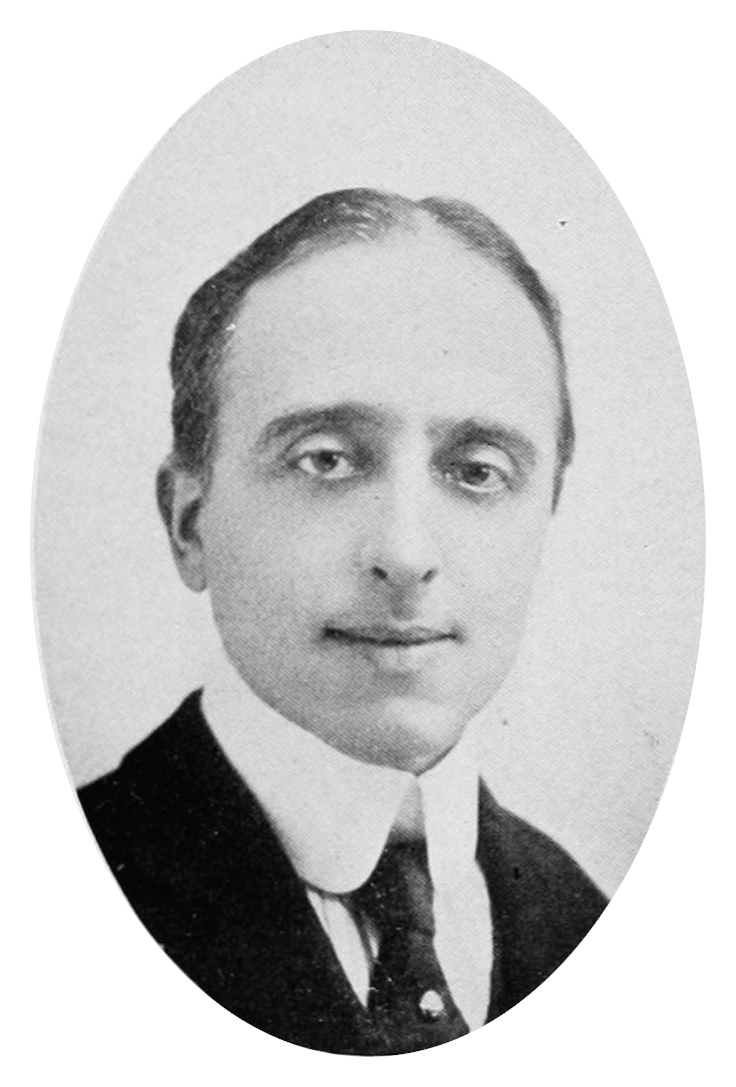
Ferdinand Gottschalk, circa 1909

He made his first appearance on the stage in Toronto, Ontario, Canada in 1887 and worked continuously after that date including prominent parts on the New York stage as well as in films. In 1901 he portrayed Johnny Trotter in the original production of Clyde Fitch's The Climbers at the Bijou Theatre.

== Complete filmography ==
- Please Help Emily (1917) - Herbert Threadgold
- My Wife (1918) - Biggy Gore
- Dr. Jekyll and Mr. Hyde (1920) - Old Man at table in music hall (uncredited)
- Zaza (1923) - Duke de Brissac
- Many Happy Returns (1930, Short)
- Tonight or Never (1931) - Rudig
- Grand Hotel (1932) - Pimenov
- The Mask of Fu Manchu (1932) - British Museum Official (uncredited)
- The Sign of the Cross (1932) - Glabrio
- Grand Slam (1933) - Cedric Van Dorn
- Parole Girl (1933) - Taylor
- Girl Missing (1933) - Alvin Bradford
- The Keyhole (1933) - Brooks' Lawyer
- The Warrior's Husband (1933) - Sapiens Sr.
- Reunion in Vienna (1933) - Palace Tour Guide (uncredited)
- Ex-Lady (1933) - Mr. Herbert Smith
- Gold Diggers of 1933 (1933) - Clubman (uncredited)
- Horse Play (1933) - Oswald
- She Had to Say Yes (1933) - Sol Glass
- Midnight Club (1933) - George Rubens
- No Marriage Ties (1933) - Perkins Co. Worker (uncredited)
- Goodbye Again (1933) - Hotel Manager (scenes deleted)
- Berkeley Square (1933) - Mr. Throstle
- Female (1933) - Pettigrew
- Dancing Lady (1933) - Judge (uncredited)
- Bombay Mail (1934) - Governor Sir Anthony Daniels
- Long Lost Father (1934) - Lawyer Stewart
- Nana (1934) - Finot
- Gambling Lady (1934) - Cornelius - Lawyer
- Riptide (1934) - Orchestra Leader (uncredited)
- I Believed in You (1934) - Musician (uncredited)
- Upper World (1934) - Marcus
- The Witching Hour (1934) - Dr. von Strohn
- Stingaree (1934) - Party Guest (uncredited)
- Hollywood Party (1934) - Scientific Pedant (uncredited)
- Madame DuBarry (1934) - Lebel
- The Notorious Sophie Lang (1934) - Augustus Telfen
- One Exciting Adventure (1934) - Jeweler
- King Kelly of the U.S.A. (1934) - King Maxmilian of Belgardia
- Cleopatra (1934) - Glabrio (scenes deleted)
- I Sell Anything (1934) - Barouche
- I Am a Thief (1934) - M. Cassiet
- Secret of the Chateau (1934) - Chief Inspector Marotte
- Sing Sing Nights (1934) - Professor Varney
- The Man Who Reclaimed His Head (1934) - Baron de Montford - in Theatre Box (uncredited)
- Clive of India (1935) - Old Member
- Folies Bergère de Paris (1935) - Perishot
- Night Life of the Gods (1935) - Old Man Turner
- Les Misérables (1935) - Thenardier
- Vagabond Lady (1935) - Mr. 'Higgy' Higginbotham
- L'homme des Folies Bergère (1935) - Perichot
- Break of Hearts (1935) - Enrico Pazzini
- Here Comes the Band (1935) - Armand de Valerie
- Red Salute (1935) - League Speaker
- The Gay Deception (1935) - Mr. Squires
- Three Kids and a Queen (1935) - Dr. Flesig
- Peter Ibbetson (1935) - Minor Role (scenes deleted)
- The Melody Lingers On (1935) - Da Vigna
- The Man Who Broke the Bank at Monte Carlo (1935) - Office Man
- I Dream Too Much (1935) - Snobbish Critic (uncredited)
- Bunker Bean (1936) - Dr. Meyerhauser
- Suzy (1936) - Proprietor of Café Anges (uncredited)
- The Garden of Allah (1936) - Hotel Clerk (uncredited)
- White Legion (1936) - Dr. Fontaine
- The Man I Marry (1936) - Organist
- Along Came Love (1936) - Mr. Vincent
- That Girl from Paris (1936) - Nikki's Uncle (uncredited)
- The Crime Nobody Saw (1937) - John Atherton
- Café Metropole (1937) - Monsieur Leon Monnet
- Carnival in Paris (1937, Short) - Museum Director
- Ali Baba Goes to Town (1937) - Chief Councilor
- I'll Take Romance (1937) - Monsieur Ginard
- Romance in the Dark (1938) - Pianist (uncredited)
- The Adventures of Marco Polo (1938) - Persian Ambassador
- Stolen Heaven (1938) - Lubert
- Josette (1938) - Papa Le Blanc
