= Madame Du Barry (1934 film) =

1934 film by William Dieterle

Madame DuBarry
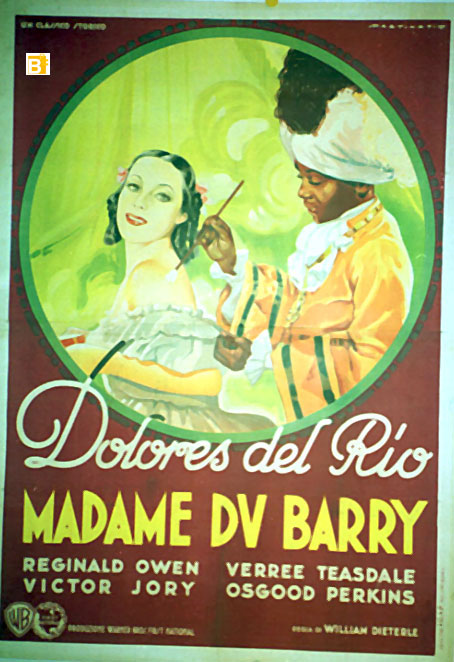
- Promotional poster for the film.
- Directed by: William Dieterle
- Written by: Edward Chodorov
- Produced by: Jack L. Warner; Hal B. Wallis
- Starring: Dolores del Río; Reginald Owen; Victor Jory
- Cinematography: Sol Polito
- Edited by: Herbert I. Leeds
- Music by: Heinz Roemheld
- Production company: Warner Bros. Pictures
- Distributed by: Warner Bros. Pictures
- Release date: October 13, 1934
- Running time: 79 minutes
- Country: United States
- Language: English

Madame Du Barry is a 1934 American historical film directed by William Dieterle and starring Dolores del Río, Reginald Owen, Victor Jory and Osgood Perkins. The film portrays the life of Madame Du Barry, the last mistress of King Louis XV. While this film does not serve accuracy to Madame Du Barry, it does feature antiques and jewelry that came from the actual days when Madame Du Barry lived. This film was being edited just as the Hollywood Production Code was gaining real power, and faced many problems with censors of the time. A May 27, 1934, New York Times column, “Studio Activities on the Western Front”, focusing on the “cracking down” of censors noted that a reel and a half had already been cut from the film, including a bedroom scene.

== Plot ==
Louis XV, the pleasure-loving King of France in the mid-eighteenth century, is nearing 60, and, his wife and his important and beloved former mistress Madame de Pompadour both being gone, he yearns for a new woman companion who would treat him as a man rather than as a favour-dispensing king. He fails to find such a woman at the Deer Park, a "school" for ladies in waiting— and would-be royal mistresses— set up in memory of Madame de Pompadour. However, one of his courtiers, the Duc de Richelieu, knows (as a lover or customer, it is strongly suggested) a young woman of the people, Jeanne du Barry, who is an exuberant, free-spirited soul with no agenda except having a good time. He introduces her to Louis, and she makes a hit. She moves into Versailles, where Louis showers her with extravagant gifts, and she keeps him fascinated with changing moods and challenges. Early in their relationship, she demands a sleigh ride with Louis in the summer, and Lebel, the palace steward, has to arrange this by buying all the sugar in Paris to put under the sleigh runners.

Du Barry and Louis have unalloyed fun for a while, but Louis's three grown daughters and their friend the Duchesse de Granmont are scandalized and join with the Prime Minister, Choiseul, to try to freeze her out of court. Richelieu's nephew, the upright official the Duc d'Aiguillon, rebukes Louis and Du Barry for ruining France with their extravagance, and opposes a war with England Choiseul wants to start. When Choiseul spoils Du Barry's formal court presentation by having her dress and wig stolen and the tipsy noblewoman who was to present her abducted, she shows up at the court gathering in her nightgown, and Louis storms out but then turns and beckons her to follow. Du Barry takes revenge on Choiseul by charming him, promising him a reward and luring him into a compromising situation where Louis catches him seemingly trying to take liberties with her. Louis fires Choiseul and makes D’Aiguillon Prime Minister, and the war with England is averted, to the bemusement of the English ambassador at the trivial cause of so major a result.

Louis’ slow, pedantic grandson and heir, Louis the Dauphin, is betrothed to the Austrian princess Marie Antoinette, and Du Barry is among those who drive to the frontier with Louis and the Dauphin to receive her. Marie Antoinette snubs her, which she takes with good humour. After an elaborate wedding party that ends in a thunderstorm, the Dauphin spends his wedding night lecturing Marie Antoinette on the causes of the weather instead of comforting her. Louis asks Du Barry to talk to him about the facts of life for the sake of France; Marie Antoinette and her new allies, Louis’ sisters and the Duchesse de Granmont, are furious when they find Du Barry and the Dauphin behind a closed door, though nothing has happened. As they all shout at each other, Louis collapses.

Du Barry gathers his favourite field flowers and makes her way to his deathbed as his family and the doctors abandon it. They share some happy memories, and he dies. Du Barry is packing to leave when word comes that she is to be deprived of the castle Louis gave her and imprisoned in another chateau. She bids a mocking farewell to Marie Antoinette and the Dauphin, now Louis XVI, and goes off between two officers, ruefully singing the trivial little song she sang to Louis throughout their relationship.

== Cast ==
- Dolores del Río as Madame Du Barry
- Reginald Owen as Louis XV
- Victor Jory as Duc Armand d'Aiguillon
- Osgood Perkins as Duc de Richelieu
- Verree Teasdale as Duchess de Granmont
- Ferdinand Gottschalk as Lebel
- Anita Louise as Marie Antoinette
- Maynard Holmes as The Dauphin
- Henry O'Neill as Duc de Choiseul
- Hobart Cavanaugh as Professor de la Vauguyon
- Halliwell Hobbes as English Ambassador
- Arthur Treacher as Andre
- Jesse Scott as Zamore
- Robert Greig as The King's Chef (uncredited)
- Edward LeSaint as Doctor (uncredited)
- Leo White as Wig Man (uncredited)

== Reception ==
In his October 25, 1934 review, The New York Times critic Andre Sennwald praised the film's visual presentation and Reginald Owen's performance as Louis XV, but criticized Dolores del Río's portrayal of Madame du Barry and the screenplay's treatment of its characters. He also praised supporting performances by Osgood Perkins and Victor Jory.[3]

Madame Du Barry was considered a box-office disappointment for Warner Bros.
