= Andrew Varick Stout Anthony =

American wood engraver

- Born: 4 December 1835; New York, New York, United States
- Died: 2 July 1906 (aged 70); Boston, Massachusetts
- Occupation: Wood engraver
- Notable work: Mabel Martin (1876), Ballads of New England (1870)
- Relatives: Osgood Perkins (grandson); Anthony Perkins (great-grandson); Oz Perkins (great-great-grandson); Elvis Perkins (great-great-grandson)

Andrew Varick Stout Anthony (1835 in New York City – 1906) was an American wood engraver.

== Biography ==
Anthony was the son of Eliza (Stout) and John Anthony. He studied drawing and engraving under the best teachers in New York, and was one of the original members of the American Water Color Society. He passed part of his professional life in New York and California, but settled in Boston in 1878.

He was married to Mary Aurelia (Walker). His grandson was actor Osgood Perkins, his great-grandson was actor Anthony Perkins, and his great-great-grandsons are Oz and Elvis Perkins.

== Works ==
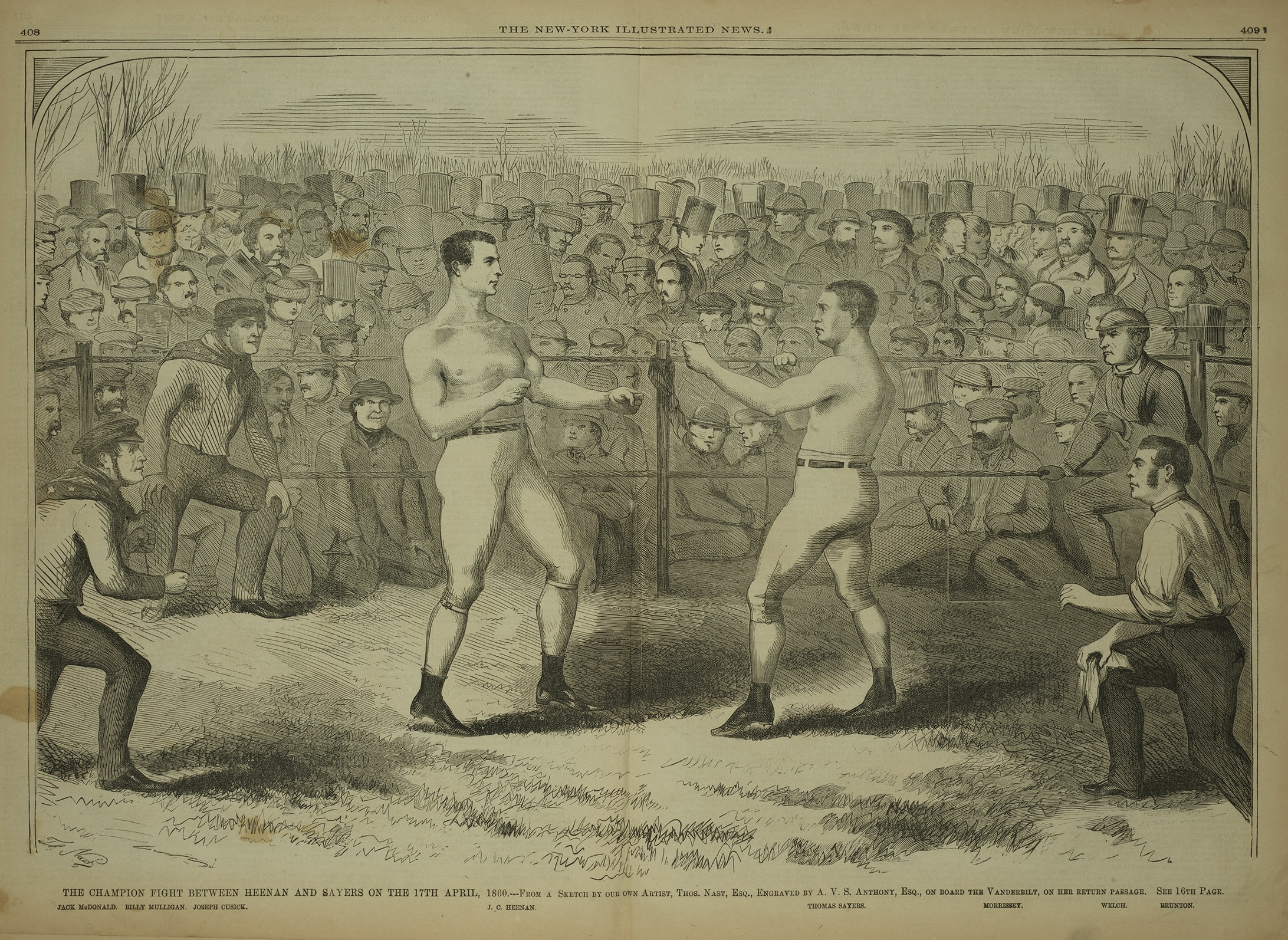
The Champion Fight between Heenan and Sayers on the 17th April, 1860. From a sketch by Thomas Nast, engraved by A.V.S. Anthony, on board the Vanderbilt, on her return passage, for the New York Illustrated News

His most conspicuous success was achieved as a line engraver. Among his best known works are the illustrations for John Greenleaf Whittier's Snow-Bound (1867), Ballads of New England (1870), and Mabel Martin (1876); Henry Wadsworth Longfellow's Skeleton in Armor (1877), and Nathaniel Hawthorne's The Scarlet Letter (1878). The illustrated edition of Geraldine (a "rhythymic [sic?] romance" written by Alphonso A. Hopkins in 1881) was published in 1887 with illustrations "drawn, engraved, and printed under the supervision of A.V.S. Anthony." It is a particularly interesting edition because the illustrations are not only demonstrative of the themes, but are accurate drawings of sites and features along the St. Lawrence River.
