= The Country Flapper =

1922 film by F. Richard Jones

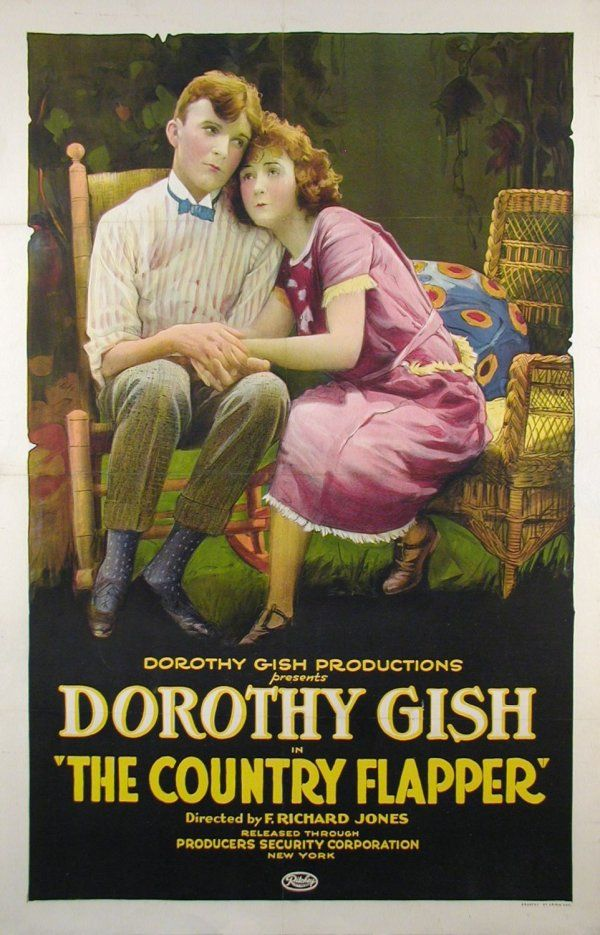
- Directed by: F. Richard Jones
- Written by: Harry Carr; Joseph Farnham
- Based on: The Cynic Effect by Nalbro Bartley
- Produced by: Dorothy Gish
- Starring: Dorothy Gish; Glenn Hunter; Tom Douglas; Mildred Marsh; Harlan Knight; Raymond Hackett; Albert Hacket; Catherine Collins
- Cinematography: Fred Chaston
- Edited by: Joseph Farnham
- Production company: Dorothy Gish Productions
- Distributed by: Producers Security Corporation
- Release date: July 29, 1922
- Running time: 50 minutes
- Country: United States
- Languages: Silent; English intertitles

The Country Flapper is a 1922 American silent comedy film directed by F. Richard Jones and starring Dorothy Gish, Glenn Hunter and Tom Douglas. The film is based on "The Cynic Effect," a short story by Nalbro Bartley.

== Plot ==
Jolanda, a young flapper, goes to great lengths to secure her relationship with Nathaniel Huggins, the son of the town's pharmacist. However, Ezra Huggins, the father, doesn't approve of the relationship. To her luck, Jolanda happens to overhear a conversation in which she finds out that Ezra is illegally producing alcohol in his barn. Jolanda uses this to blackmail him, gaining his consent for her to be with his son. To get rid of Jolanda's power, Ezra burns his barn to destroy the evidence that Jolanda has against him. Jolanda gets caught in the fire and is rescued by Lemuell Philpotts, the bashful boy who has loved her the whole time. She ultimately loses Nathaniel to her enemy, Marguerite; however, she ends up with Nathaniel, who truly cares for her.

== Cast ==
- Dorothy Gish as Jolanda Whiple - the Flapper
- Glenn Hunter as Nathaniel Huggins - the Boy
- Tom Douglas as Lemuell Philpotts - the Bashful Boy
- Raymond Hackett as Shipp Jumpp
- Albert Hackett as Hopp Jumpp
- Kathleen Collins as Jolanda's Sister
- Mildred Marsh as Marguerite - the Other Flapper
- Harlan Knight as Ezra Huggins - Nathanial's Father

== Reception ==
Time magazine was ruthless with its review:

"Includes in its cast two of the best comedy pantomimists of the screen, Dorothy Gish and Glenn Hunter. It really would seem as if they couldn't help saving the film. But, except for a few scenes which they do brighten, they are amazingly ineffectual. Because, apparently, instead of letting them act, if they know how to act by themselves, or directing them to act as every one who has even seen them knows they can act on occasion.... But it is not all Mr. Jones's fault. He had no story to begin with, but merely an assortment of stock rural characters and slap-stick small-town situations with the wit all worn off them."

The Boston American, on the other hand, found the film quite entertaining, calling it "the kind of picture to which one can—and is urged to—bring the whole family."

== Preservation ==
A 35 mm negative of the film is held by the George Eastman House.

== Bibliography ==
- Munden, Kenneth White. The American Film Institute Catalog of Motion Pictures Produced in the United States, Part 1. University of California Press, 1997.
