= Secret of the Chateau =

1934 film by Richard Thorpe

- Directed by: Richard Thorpe
- Screenplay by: Albert DeMond; Harry Behn
- Story by: Lawrence G. Blochman
- Produced by: L.L. Ostrow
- Starring: Claire Dodd; Alice White; Osgood Perkins; Jack La Rue; George E. Stone; Clark Williams
- Cinematography: Robert Planck
- Edited by: Harry Marker
- Music by: Heinz Roemheld; Oliver Wallace
- Production company: Universal Pictures
- Distributed by: Universal Pictures
- Release date: 3 December 1934
- Running time: 66 minutes

Secret of the Chateau is a 1934 American mystery film directed by Richard Thorpe. The film stars Claire Dodd, Alice White, Osgood Perkins, Jack La Rue, George E. Stone and Clark Williams. On its release, reviews from Variety, The Film Daily and The Motion Picture Herald all commented that the film was a typical mystery film. On retrospective reviews, the book Universal Horrors stated the film had little to distinguish itself from others mystery films of the 1930s and 1940s and has justly been forgotten.

== Cast ==
- Claire Dodd as Julie Verlaine
- Alice White as Didi Bonfee
- Osgood Perkins as Martin
- Jack La Rue as Lucien Vonaire
- George E. Stone as Armand
- Clark Williams as Paul De Brunay
- William Faversham as Monsieur Fos / Professor Racque
- Ferdinand Gottschalk as Chief Inspector Marotte
- DeWitt Jennings as Louis Bardou
- Helen Ware as Madame Rombiere
- Frank Reicher as Auctioneer
- Alphonse Ethier as Commissioner

== Production ==
Prior to the film's release, it had the title Rendezvous at Midnight which the studio would use the next year for a different film entirely. The film went into production in late August 1934. Universal Pictures back lot European set was redressed to resemble a cafe and shop set based on Montparnasse section of Paris. Production finished in September 1934.

== Release ==
Secret of the Chateau was distributed by Universal Pictures on December 3, 1934.

== Reception ==
Michael R. Pitts in Thrills Untapped described the film as being "nixed" by critics on its release. From contemporary reviews "Chic." of Variety stated the film was "pretty flat" and had a "Thin, creaky plot" and that its "slow movement almost negates the value of some good acting here." The Film Daily stated the film "just another of those spooky murder mysteries." and that "all the well known ingredients of the spook melodrama have been thrown into this one, but the affair doesn't quite jell." "McCarthy" in The Motion Picture Herald stated that the film "makes no attempts at pretentiousness" and told readers to "See it for what it is, building a campaign that dares audiences to identify the criminal until the very end and accenting its amusing entertainment."

From retrospective reviews, In their book Universal Horrors, the authors described the film as a "dime-store whodunnit" and stated it had "little to distinguish it from the dozens of bottom-of-the-bill program mysteries that Hollywood studios cranked out with regularity in the '30s and '40s." Their review concluded that the film was "brief, somewhat lively, and totally predictable. Seldom revived, it richly deserves its status as a forgotten Universal picture."
