= Maggie Mitchell =

American actress (1832–1918)

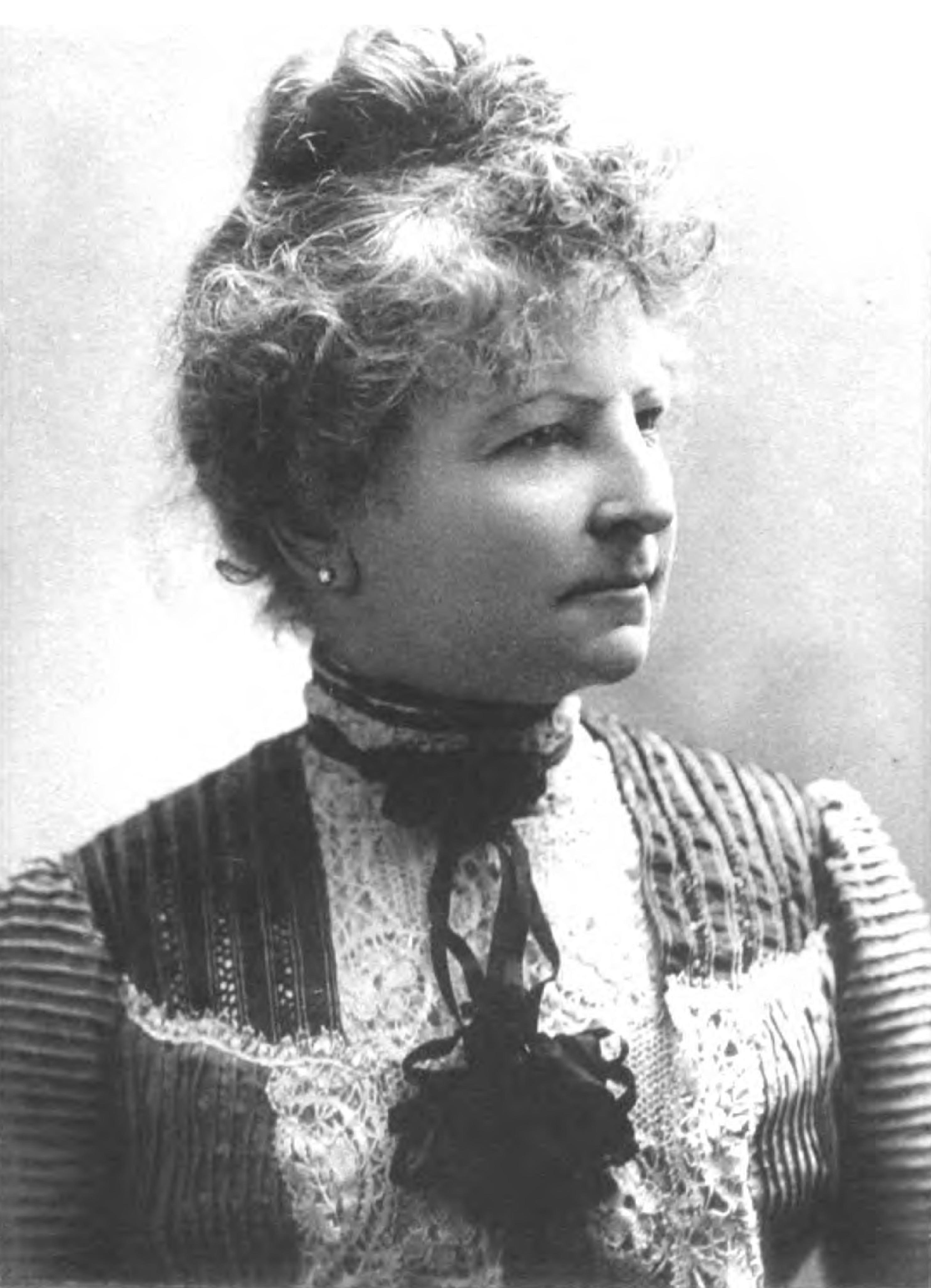
- Born: Margaret Julia Mitchell; June 2, 1832; New York City, New York
- Died: March 22, 1918 (aged 85); New York City, New York

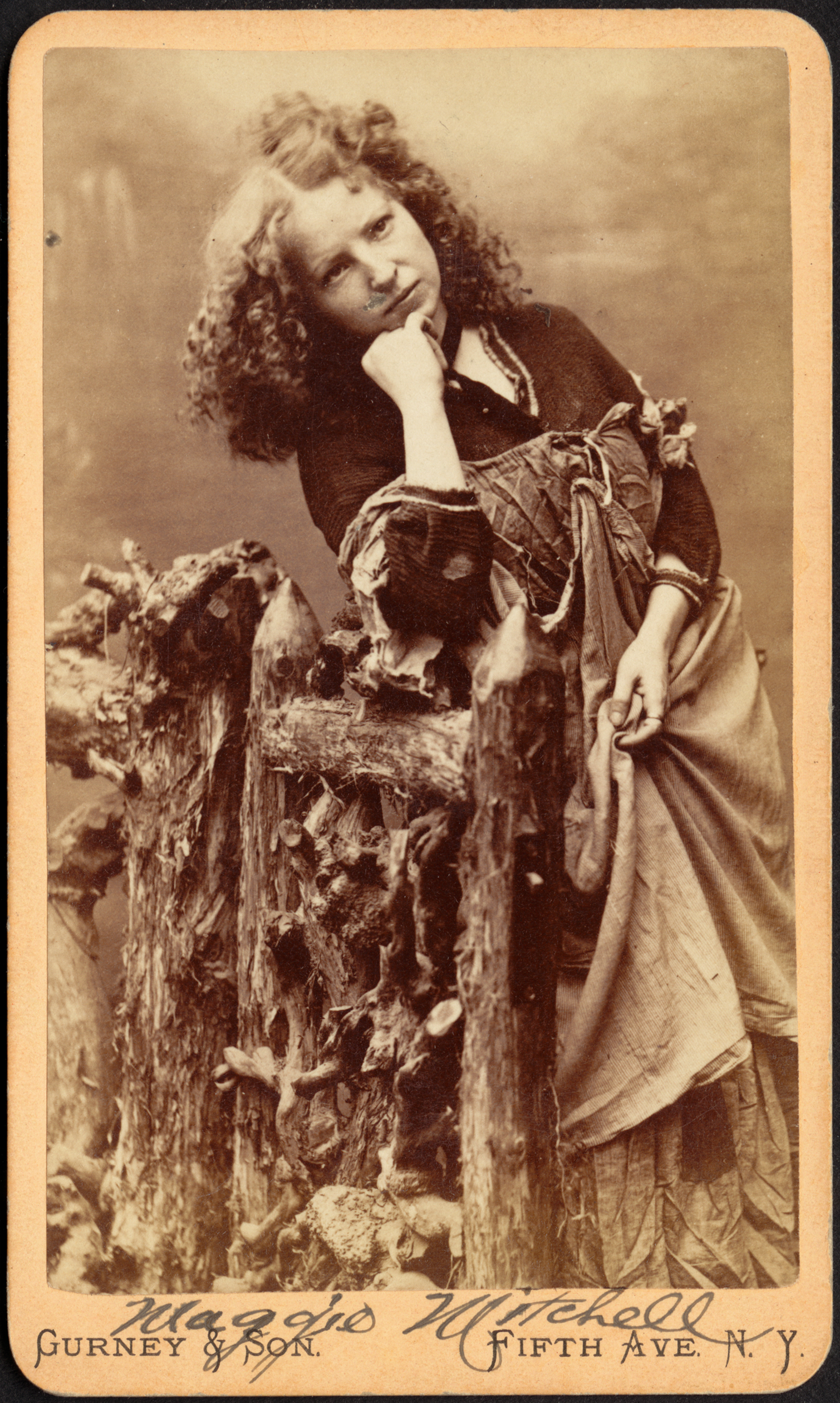
Maggie Mitchell, [ca. 1859–1870]. Carte de Visite Collection, Boston Public Library

Margaret Julia Mitchell (June 2, 1832 – March 22, 1918) was an American actress, born in New York City. She made her speaking debut as Julia in The Soldier's Daughter at the Chambers Street Theatre in 1851. The parts in which she earned the greatest fame were Jane Eyre, Mignon, Little Barefoot, and Fanchon the Cricket.

Mitchell was at the outset of the Civil War a Confederate sympathizer, but later moderated her views. She reportedly danced on an American flag while performing in Montgomery, Alabama, but later denied doing so. Her southern sympathies, charismatic personality and profession made her a warm, close friend of John Wilkes Booth, but also earned her the admiration of Abraham Lincoln, who invited her to tea in the Executive Mansion and enjoyed her performances at Ford's Theatre.

== Family ==
She was married to Henry Thomas Paddock (1836–1896), a Cleveland haberdasher who then became her manager, in 1868, and they had (i) a daughter, Fanchon Maria Paddock (1869–1940), who married Harry Paddock Mashey (1878–1960), and (ii) a son, Harry Mitchell Paddock (1872–1938). Maggie and Henry divorced twenty years later; and – on October 12, 1889, in Boston – she married her co-star Charles Abbott (stage name of Charles Abbott Mace; 1852–1927). She retired from the stage to live in New York in 1892. Maggie, by way of one of her half-sisters – Sophia Dodson Lomax (1826–1894) and husband, Charles Alfred Mitchell (1817–1864) – was an aunt of Julian Bugher Mitchell (1851–1926), a musical comedy director associated with Weber & Fields and Florenz Ziegfeld.

Maggie's mother was Hannah Dodson (maiden; 1805–1869), born Knaresborough, Yorkshire. She married – on February 24, 1824, in Manchester – John Lomax (1803–1832), a native of Bolton, and emigrated to the US in 1830. In 1832, they were preparing to return to England to escape an epidemic of cholera, but Lomax died before they sailed. Hannah afterward married Maggie's father, Charles S. Mitchell (1805–1886), to whom Lomax's bookbinding business had been sold. Mitchell's 1st cousin, Joseph Dodson Greenhalgh (1821–1886), recalled stories that circulated in the English side of the family about the actress's salary, her servants, accouterments, and jewelry. The actor and author Dodson Mitchell was still another relation.

Maggie's mother was a sister of Ann Dodson (maiden; 1788–1863), who, with her husband Thomas Greenhalge (1780–1859), was a grandmother of Frederic Thomas Greenhalge (1842–1896), the 38th Governor of Massachusetts. Maggie's maternal half-sister, Mary Mitchell (née Lomax; 1833–1908) – also an actress – was married to John William Albaugh, Sr. (1837–1909), an actor and theater operator, notably, from 1884 to 1894, proprietor of Albaugh's Grand Opera House (2,000 seats) in Washington, D.C.

== Death ==
After her death on March 22, 1918, in New York City, one of the wealthiest actresses in the world (primarily in Manhattan and Long Branch, New Jersey, real estate), Mitchell was interred in Green-Wood Cemetery in Brooklyn.
