= Youthful Cheaters =

1923 film

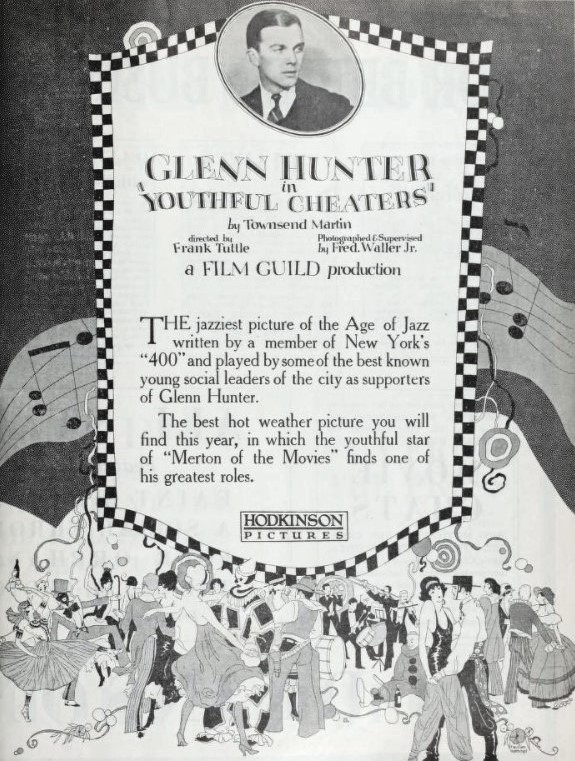
- Trade advertisement
- Directed by: Frank Tuttle
- Written by: Townsend Martin
- Starring: William Calhoun; Glenn Hunter; Martha Mansfield
- Cinematography: Fred Waller
- Production company: Film Guild
- Distributed by: W. W. Hodkinson Corporation
- Release date: May 6, 1923
- Running time: 6 reels
- Country: United States
- Language: Silent (English intertitles)

Youthful Cheaters is a 1923 American silent drama film directed by Frank Tuttle and starring William Calhoun, Glenn Hunter, and Martha Mansfield.

== Cast ==
- William Calhoun as Edmund McDonald
- Glenn Hunter as Ted MacDonald
- Martha Mansfield as Lois Brooke
- Marie Burke as Mrs. H. Clifton Brooke
- Nona Marden as Marie Choisuil
- Dwight Wiman as Dexter French

== Preservation ==
With no prints of Youthful Cheaters located in any film archives, it is a lost film.

== Bibliography ==
- Munden, Kenneth White. The American Film Institute Catalog of Motion Pictures Produced in the United States, Part 1. University of California Press, 1997.
