= Frank Tuttle =

American film director (1892–1963)

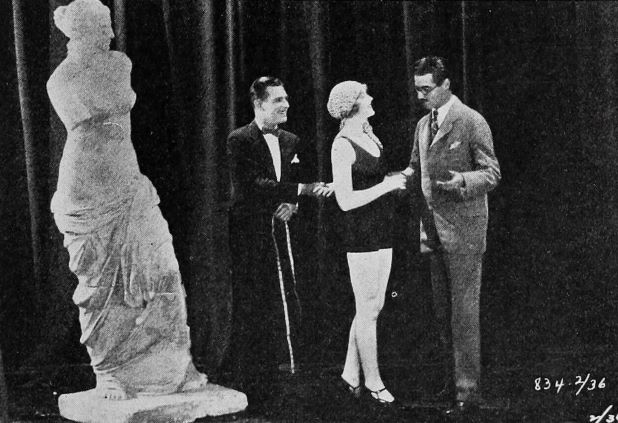
- On the far right shaking hands with Esther Ralston in 1925
- Born: Frank Wright Tuttle; August 6, 1892; New York City, New York, U.S.
- Died: January 6, 1963 (aged 70); Hollywood, California, U.S.
- Education: Yale University
- Occupations: Hollywood film director and screenwriter
- Employer: Paramount Pictures
- Known for: This Gun for Hire (1942); I Stole a Million (1939); College Holiday (1936); The Glass Key (1935); Roman Scandals (1933); This Is the Night (1932); Paramount on Parade (1930); The Untamed Lady (1926); Kid Boots (1926)
- Children: 3

Frank Wright Tuttle (August 6, 1892 – January 6, 1963) was a Hollywood film director and writer who directed films from 1922 (The Cradle Buster) to 1959 (Island of Lost Women).

== Biography ==
“Frank Tuttle was a director of some skill who showed occasional flashes of talent, but for the greater part of his career he buried himself in irredeemable studio assignments...a long string of routine films, mainly for Paramount Pictures, leaves the impression that Tuttle was a hack with no personal style and no particular skill at grabbing the more interesting assignments...Tuttle, in fact, never lost his youthful zeal and even after years of racing through projects like Waikiki Wedding (1937) and College Holiday (1936) still maintained hopes of creating something not merely artistic but ‘meaningful,’ rather like the fictional director in Preston Sturges’ Sullivan’s Travels (1941) ... But Tuttle had neither the talent nor the clout to achieve his aims [and] he soon returned to the practically anonymous production of studio potboilers.”—Film historian Richard Koszarski in Hollywood Directors: 1914-1940 (1976)

Frank Tuttle was educated at Yale University, where he edited campus humor magazine The Yale Record.

After graduation, he worked in New York City in the advertising department of the Metropolitan Music Bureau. He later moved to Hollywood, where he became a film director for Paramount. His films are largely in the comedy, in the first part of his career, and film noir genres, later.

In 1947, his career ground to a temporary halt with the onset of the first of the House Un-American Activities Committee hearings on Communist infiltration of the movie industry. Tuttle had joined the American Communist Party in 1937 in reaction to Hitler's rise to power. Unable to find work in the United States, he moved to France, where he made Gunman in the Streets (1950) starring Simone Signoret and Dane Clark. In 1951, after a decade as a member of the Communist Party, Tuttle gave 36 names to the HUAC.

== Death ==
Tuttle died in Hollywood, California, on January 6, 1963, aged 70. He was survived by his three children.

== Selected filmography ==
- The Cradle Buster (1922)
- Puritan Passions (1923) starring Mary Astor
- Second Fiddle (1923) starring Mary Astor
- Youthful Cheaters (1923)
- Grit (1924)
- Dangerous Money (1924)
- The Manicure Girl (1925)
- The Lucky Devil (1925)
- Lovers in Quarantine (1925) starring Bebe Daniels and the other Harrison Ford
- Kid Boots (1926) starring Eddie Cantor and Clara Bow
- Love 'Em and Leave 'Em (1926) starring Evelyn Brent and Louise Brooks
- The American Venus (1926) with Douglas Fairbanks, Jr.
- The Untamed Lady (1926) starring Gloria Swanson
- Blind Alleys (1927) starring Evelyn Brent and Thomas Meighan
- Time to Love (1927)
- One Woman to Another (1927)
- Something Always Happens (1928)
- Varsity (1928) starring Charles "Buddy" Rogers and Mary Brian
- The Canary Murder Case (additional sound footage; 1929) starring William Powell as Philo Vance
- The Green Murder Case starring William Powell as Philo Vance
- Sweetie (1929) starring Nancy Carroll
- Paramount on Parade (1930), Paramount's all-star revue with a screenplay by Joseph L. Mankiewicz
- Love Among the Millionaires (1930) starring Clara Bow.
- The Benson Murder Case (1930) starring William Powell as Philo Vance
- True to the Navy (1930) starring Clara Bow and Fredric March
- It Pays to Advertise (1931) starring Carole Lombard
- No Limit (1931) starring Clara Bow and Thelma Todd
- This Reckless Age starring Charles "Buddy" Rogers
- The Big Broadcast (1932) starring Bing Crosby
- This Is the Night (1932) with Cary Grant
- Roman Scandals (1933) starring Eddie Cantor
- Springtime for Henry (1934) starring Otto Kruger and Nigel Bruce
- Here is My Heart (1934) starring Bing Crosby
- Ladies Should Listen (1934) starring Cary Grant
- Two for Tonight (1935) starring Bing Crosby
- The Glass Key (1935), film adaptation of Dashiell Hammett's novel of the same name
- All the King's Horses (1935) starring Carl Brisson
- College Holiday (1936) starring Jack Benny, George Burns and Gracie Allen
- Waikiki Wedding (1937) starring Bing Crosby
- Doctor Rhythm (1938) starring Bing Crosby
- Paris Honeymoon (1939) starring Bing Crosby
- I Stole a Million (1939) starring George Raft and written by Nathanael West
- Charlie McCarthy, Detective (1939) starring Edgar Bergen
- Lucky Jordan (1942) starring Alan Ladd and Helen Walker
- This Gun for Hire (1942) starring Alan Ladd and Veronica Lake
- Star Spangled Rhythm (contributing director; 1943) with sketches by George S. Kaufman
- The Hour Before the Dawn (1944) starring Veronica Lake and based on the novel by W. Somerset Maugham
- Don Juan Quilligan (1945) starring William Bendix and Phil Silvers
- The Great John L. (1945) starring Linda Darnell
- Suspense (1946) starring Barry Sullivan and Belita
- Swell Guy (1946) starring Sonny Tufts
- Gunman in the Streets (1950) starring Simone Signoret
- The Magic Face (1951) starring Luther Adler
- Hell on Frisco Bay (1956) starring Alan Ladd and Edward G. Robinson
- A Cry in the Night (1956) starring Edmond O'Brien, Natalie Wood and Raymond Burr
- Island of Lost Women (1959) starring Jeff Richards and produced by Alan Ladd
