= King Kelly of the U.S.A. =

1934 film directed by Leonard Fields

- Cartoon Kelly sings to cartoon Catherine
- Directed by: Leonard Fields
- Written by: Story: George C. Bertholon; Howard Higgin; Screenplay: David Silverstein; Leonard Fields
- Produced by: George C. Bertholon
- Starring: Guy Robertson; Edgar Kennedy; Irene Ware; Ferdinand Gottschalk
- Cinematography: Robert H. Planck
- Edited by: Jack Ogilvie
- Music by: Bernie Grossman; Joe Sanders
- Distributed by: Monogram Pictures
- Release date: September 15, 1934
- Running time: 66 minutes
- Country: United States
- Language: English

King Kelly of the U.S.A. is a 1934 American romantic musical film directed by Leonard Fields. The film stars then popular singer Guy Robertson in his only feature film appearance.

== Plot ==
James W. Kelly (Guy Robertson) and his pal Happy Moran (Edgar Kennedy) are taking their all-girl-dancing troupe "Kelly's Affairs" across the ocean on the SS Île de France to tour Europe. Despite warning his troupe not to fall in love, Kelly and the mysterious Catherine Bell (Irene Ware), fall for each other, literally. Maxine sets her gold-digging sights on wealthy J. Ashton Brockton (Franklin Pangborn). Brockton sends his secretary to buy Maxine out of Kelly's Affairs, but Kelly refuses to break up the act.

When their backers pull out, Happy and Kelly are unable to manage to scrounge enough money to get the girls back home. Brockton has also been informed of bad news; his high paid contract as an efficiency expert to the Kingdom of Belgardia is a bad move as the nation is broke. The scheming Brockton sees his chance to kill two birds with one stone; he swaps management of the entire troupe of Kelly's Affairs to get his girlfriend and for exchange gives Kelly his position in Belgardia where Kelly and Happy believe they will "live like kings".

Belgardia is a tiny kingdom with a population 50,012 where the GDP is measured in mops. When King Maxmilian leaves his royal palace for a bicycle ride, he has his bicycle destroyed in a country ditch. He hitches a ride with Kelly and Happy who believe him a tramp, and make him act as their servant to impress the King. With the incognito King carrying their bags, the gates of the Royal Palace are opened to them.

The pair discover that Belgardia is broke, especially hard hit by the fact that no one is buying mops as they now use vacuum cleaners instead. Spying a pair of tourists offering to pay money to get inside the castle, Kelly has an idea to open the nation to tourism and charge fees for touring, then opens the palace as an amusement park with mops as prizes. As a crooner, Kelly tries to sell mops by appealing to women's vanity, using a radio show to pull the kingdom out of bankruptcy, and win Catherine Bell, who is actually Princess Tania, from their shipboard romance.

Time is running out, as Prince Alexis, (William Orlamond), invades, from the neighbouring country of Moronia, to seize the castle and marry the Princess. Their only defence, as the army has quit for not being paid, are the women tourist customers and their “Personality Mops”.

Guy Robertson, Irene Ware (1934)

== Cast ==
- Guy Robertson as James W. Kelly
- Edgar Kennedy as Happy Moran
- Irene Ware as Princess Tania aka Catherine Bell
- Ferdinand Gottschalk as King Maxmilian of Belgardia
- Franklin Pangborn as J. Ashton Brockton
- Joyce Compton as Maxine Latour
- Wilhelm von Brincken as Stranger
- Otis Harlan as Prime Minister
- William Orlamond as Prince Alexis
- Bodil Rosing as Tania's Maid
- Dick Curtis as Otto the Palace Guard
- Hattie McDaniel as the Black Narcissus Mop Buyer

== Soundtrack ==
- Guy Robertson - "Right Next Door to Love" (Music by Joe Sanders, lyrics by Bernie Grossman)
- Guy Robertson - "Believe Me" (Music by Joe Sanders, lyrics by Bernie Grossman)
- Guy Robertson and the marching mop ladies - "There's a Love Song in the Air" (Music by Joe Sanders, lyrics by Bernie Grossman)
