= Air Mail Pilot =

1928 film

- Directed by: Gene Carroll
- Written by: Harriet Virginia
- Starring: Earl Metcalfe; Blanche Mehaffey; DeWitt Jennings
- Cinematography: Lew Lang
- Production company: Superlative Pictures
- Release date: February 11, 1928
- Running time: 57 minutes
- Country: United States
- Languages: Silent; English intertitles

Air Mail Pilot is a 1928 American silent action film directed by Gene Carroll and starring Earl Metcalfe, Blanche Mehaffey and DeWitt Jennings.

== Cast ==
- Jimmy Fulton as Jimmie Dean
- Earl Metcalfe as Tom Miller
- Blanche Mehaffey as Ruth Ross
- DeWitt Jennings as Robert Ross
- Max Hawley as Hap Lester
- Carl Stockdale as Addison Simms

== Bibliography ==
- Paris, Michael. From the Wright Brothers to Top Gun: Aviation, Nationalism, and Popular Cinema. Manchester University Press, 1995.
