= The Cradle Buster =

1922 film

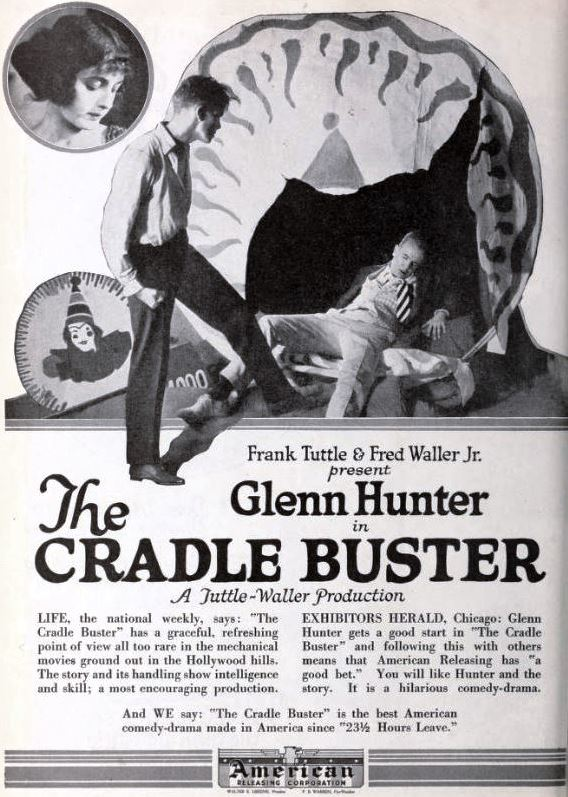
- Directed by: Frank Tuttle
- Written by: Frank Tuttle
- Produced by: Frank Tuttle; Fred Waller
- Starring: Glenn Hunter; Marguerite Courtot; William H. Tooker
- Cinematography: Fred Waller
- Edited by: Cecil R. Snape
- Production company: Patuwa Pictures
- Distributed by: American Releasing Corporation
- Release date: March 19, 1922
- Running time: 60 minutes
- Country: United States
- Languages: Silent; English intertitles

The Cradle Buster is a 1922 American silent comedy film directed by Frank Tuttle and starring Glenn Hunter, Marguerite Courtot and William H. Tooker.

== Cast ==
- Glenn Hunter as Benjamin Franklin Reed
- Marguerite Courtot as Gay Dixon
- Mary Foy as Melia Prout
- William H. Tooker as 'Blarney' Dixon
- Lois Blaine as Polly Ann Parsons
- Osgood Perkins as Crack 'Spoony'
- Townsend Martin as Holcomb Berry
- Beatrice Burton Morgan as Mrs. Reed

== Bibliography ==
- Connelly, Robert B. (1998). The Silents: Silent Feature Films, 1910-36. Vol. 40 (2nd ed.). December Press. ISBN 0913204366.
