= High Hat (1927 film) =

1927 film

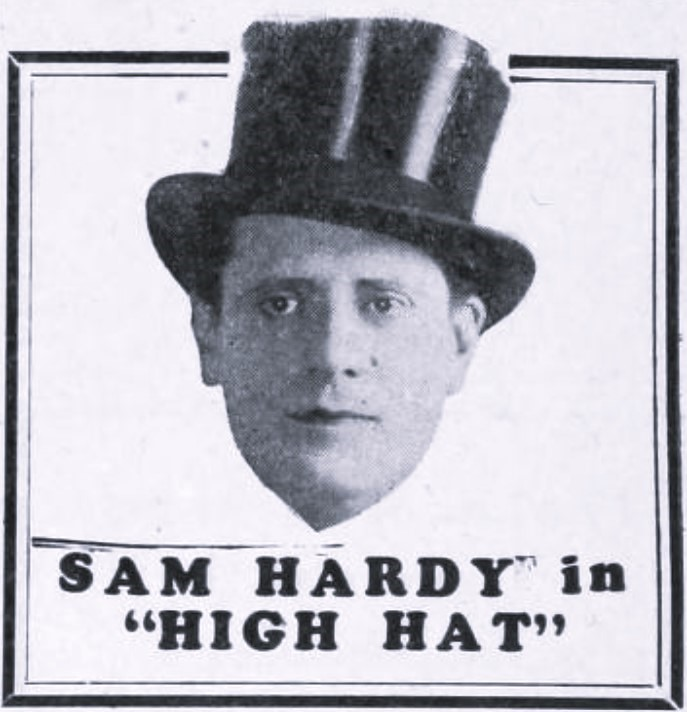
- Advertisement
- Directed by: James Ashmore Creelman
- Written by: Melville Baker
- Produced by: Robert Kane
- Starring: Sam Hardy; Mary Brian
- Cinematography: William Schurr
- Production company: Robert Kane Productions
- Distributed by: First National Pictures
- Release date: March 13, 1927
- Running time: 7 reels
- Country: United States
- Language: English

High Hat is a 1927 American silent comedy film directed by James Ashmore Creelman and starring Sam Hardy and Mary Brian.

== Plot ==
High Hat is a movie extra at First National Pictures, but sees himself as the studio pundit, dispensing advice to stars such as John Barrymore and Pola Negri. A studio seamstress named Millie gets him a lucrative "closeup" assignment in the German director Von Strogoff's epic about the Russian Revolution, but he gets fired after falling asleep on a prop bed. Millie loses valuable jewellery entrusted by her to the thief Tony, and High Hat comes to her rescue. His fight with Tony is recorded by Von Strogoff and used in the film.

== Cast ==
- Ben Lyon as Jerry
- Mary Brian as Millie
- Sam Hardy as Tony
- Osgood Perkins as The Assistant Director
- Jack Ackroyd as The Property Man
- Iris Gray as Movie Star
- Ione Holmes as Movie Star
- Franklin Pangborn as Undetermined Role
- Lucien Prival as Undetermined Role

== Preservation ==
With no prints of High Hat located in any film archives, the movie is considered lost. However silentera.com says the film survives at the UCLA Film & Television Archive.
