= Osgood Perkins (actor, born 1892) =

American actor (1892–1937)

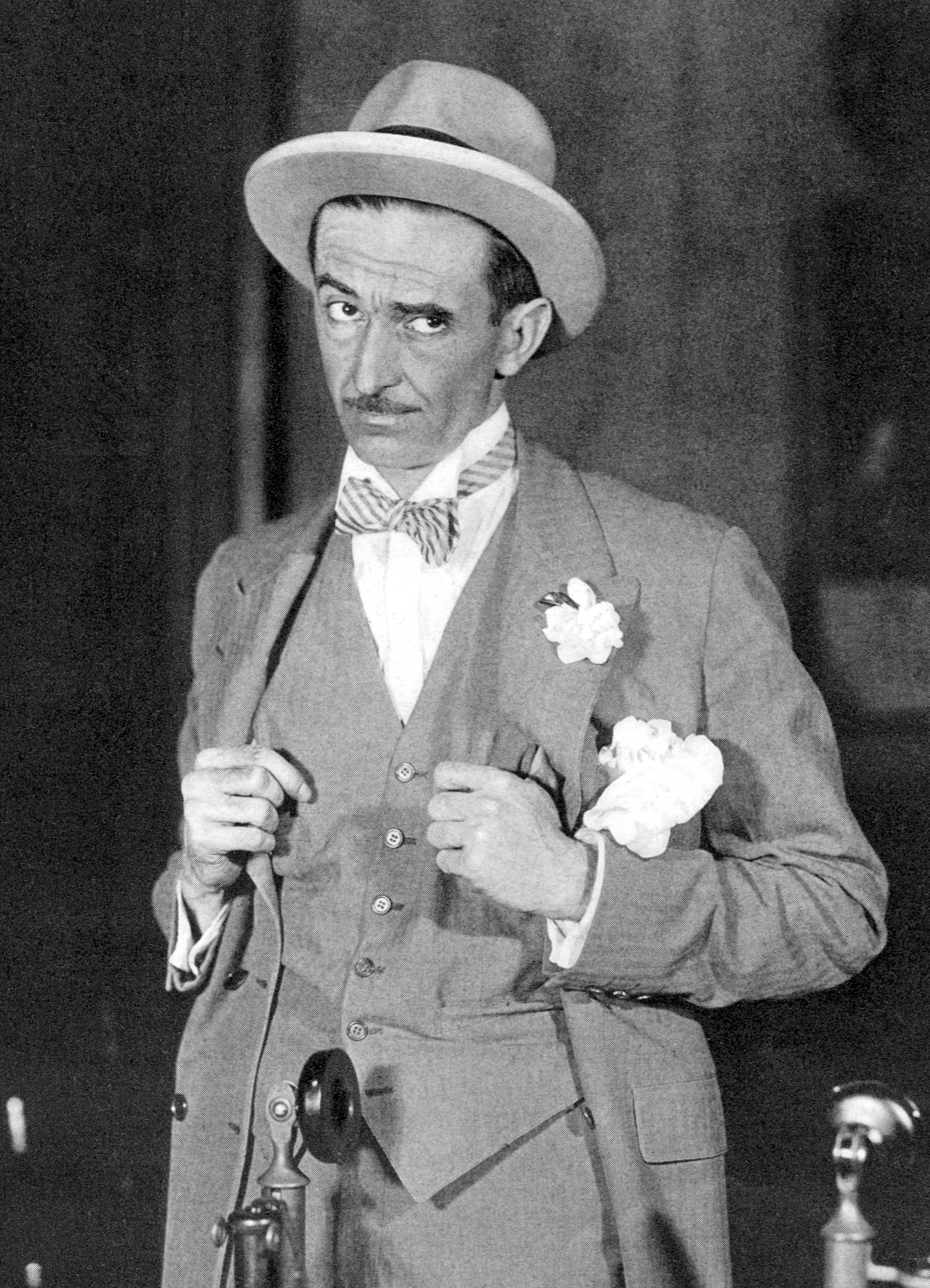
- Perkins as Walter Burns in The Front Page (1928)
- Born: James Ridley Osgood Perkins; May 16, 1892; West Newton, Massachusetts, U.S.
- Died: September 21, 1937 (aged 45)
- Occupation: Actor
- Years active: 1922–1937
- Spouse: Janet Esselstyn Rane (m. 1922)
- Children: Anthony Perkins
- Relatives: Andrew Varick Stout Anthony (grandfather); Oz Perkins (grandson); Elvis Perkins (grandson)

James Ridley Osgood Perkins (May 16, 1892 – September 21, 1937) was an American actor.

== Life and career ==
Perkins was born in West Newton, Massachusetts, son of Henry Phelps Perkins Jr., and his wife, Helen Virginia (née Anthony). His maternal grandfather was wood engraver Andrew Varick Stout Anthony. He was a graduate of Harvard College.

Perkins made his Broadway debut in 1924 in the George S. Kaufman – Marc Connelly play Beggar on Horseback. In the next 12 years, he appeared in 24 Broadway productions, including The Front Page and Uncle Vanya.

Despite his success as a leading man in the theatre, Hollywood viewed him as a character actor. He appeared in 12 silent films, including Puritan Passions, before moving to talkies such as Scarface and Gold Diggers of 1937.

Louise Brooks and Perkins appeared together in Love 'Em and Leave 'Em (1926).

Director Elia Kazan, co-founder of the influential method acting school the Group Theatre (New York City), later was impressed with Perkins's acting and sought to combine it with the Group's techniques. "There was no emotion," Mr. Kazan wrote of Perkins. "Only skill. In every aspect of technical facility, he was peerless....I believed I could take the kind of art Osgood Perkins exemplified — externally clear action, controlled every minute at every turn, with gestures spare yet eloquent — and blend that with the kind of acting the Group was built on: intense and truly emotional, rooted in the subconscious, therefore often surprising and shocking in its revelations. I could bring these two opposite and often conflicting traditions together."

On September 21, 1937, Perkins died of a heart attack in his bathtub shortly after playing in a performance of Susan and God.

Perkins was inducted, posthumously, into the American Theatre Hall of Fame in 1981.

== Personal life ==
Perkins married Janet Esselstyn Rane in 1922. They had one child, actor Anthony Perkins.

== Filmography ==
Year	Title	Role	Notes
1922	The Cradle Buster	Crack 'Spoony'	Lost film
1923	Puritan Passions	Dr. Nicholas	Lost film
1924	Grit	Boris Giovanni Smith	Lost film
1925	Wild, Wild Susan	M. Crawford Dutton	Lost film
1926	Love 'Em and Leave 'Em	Lem Woodruff	
1927	High Hat	The Assistant Director	
1927	Knockout Reilly	Spider Cross	Lost film
1929	Syncopation	Hummel	
1929	Mother's Boy	Jake Sturmberg	
1931	Tarnished Lady	Ben Sterner	
1932	Scarface	John "Johnny" Lovo	
1934	Madame DuBarry	Duc de Richelieu	
1934	Kansas City Princess	Marcel Duryea - French Private Eye	
1934	The President Vanishes	Harris Brownell	
1934	Secret of the Chateau	Martin	
1935	I Dream Too Much	Paul Darcy	
1936	Gold Diggers of 1937	Morty Wethered	
1937	A Star Is Born	Otto	Final Film (Uncredited)
