= Glenn Hunter (actor) =

American actor (1894–1945)

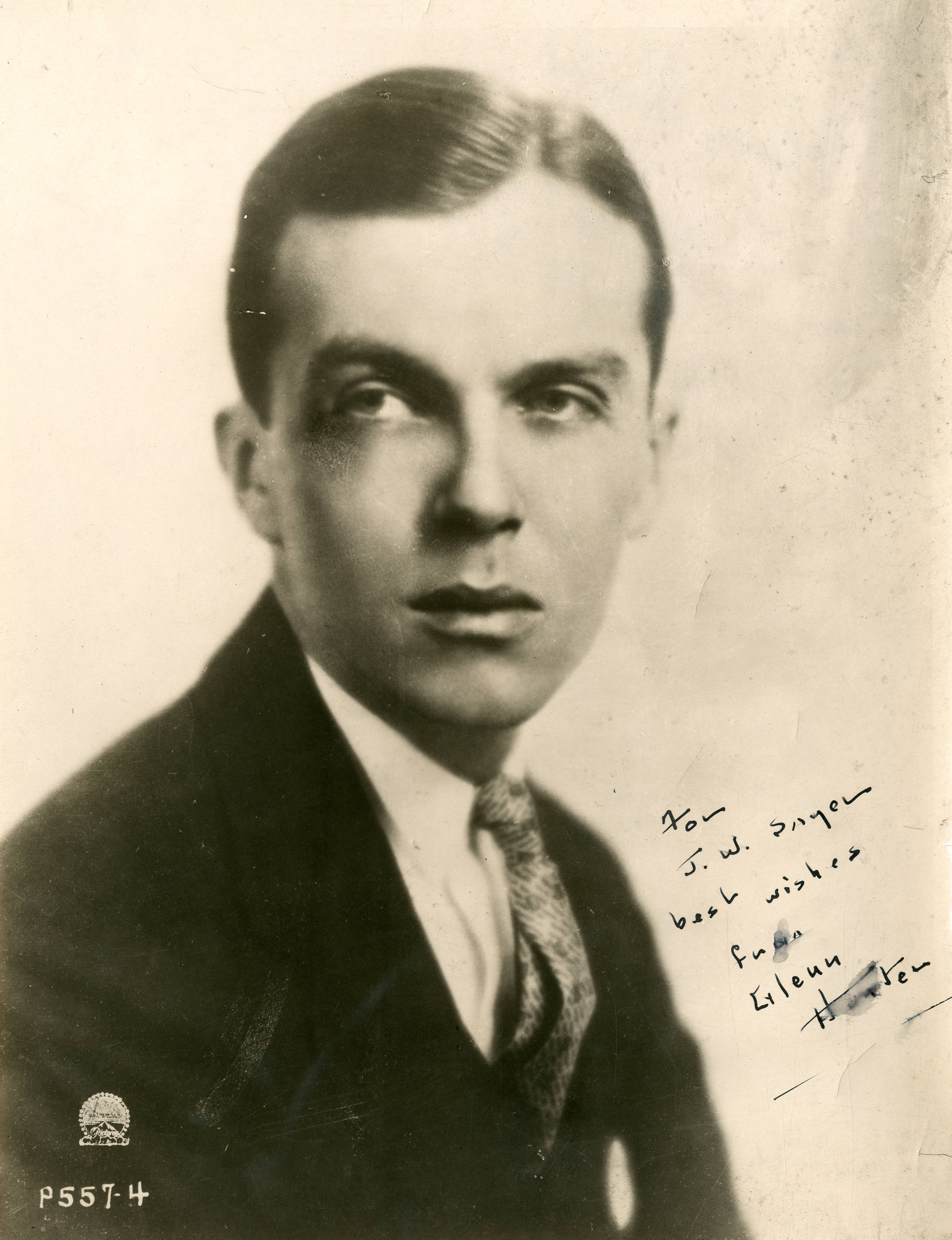
- Hunter in 1924
- Born: September 26, 1894; New York City, U.S.
- Died: December 30, 1945 (aged 51); New York City, U.S.
- Occupation: Actor
- Years active: 1915–1945
- Spouse: May Eagan

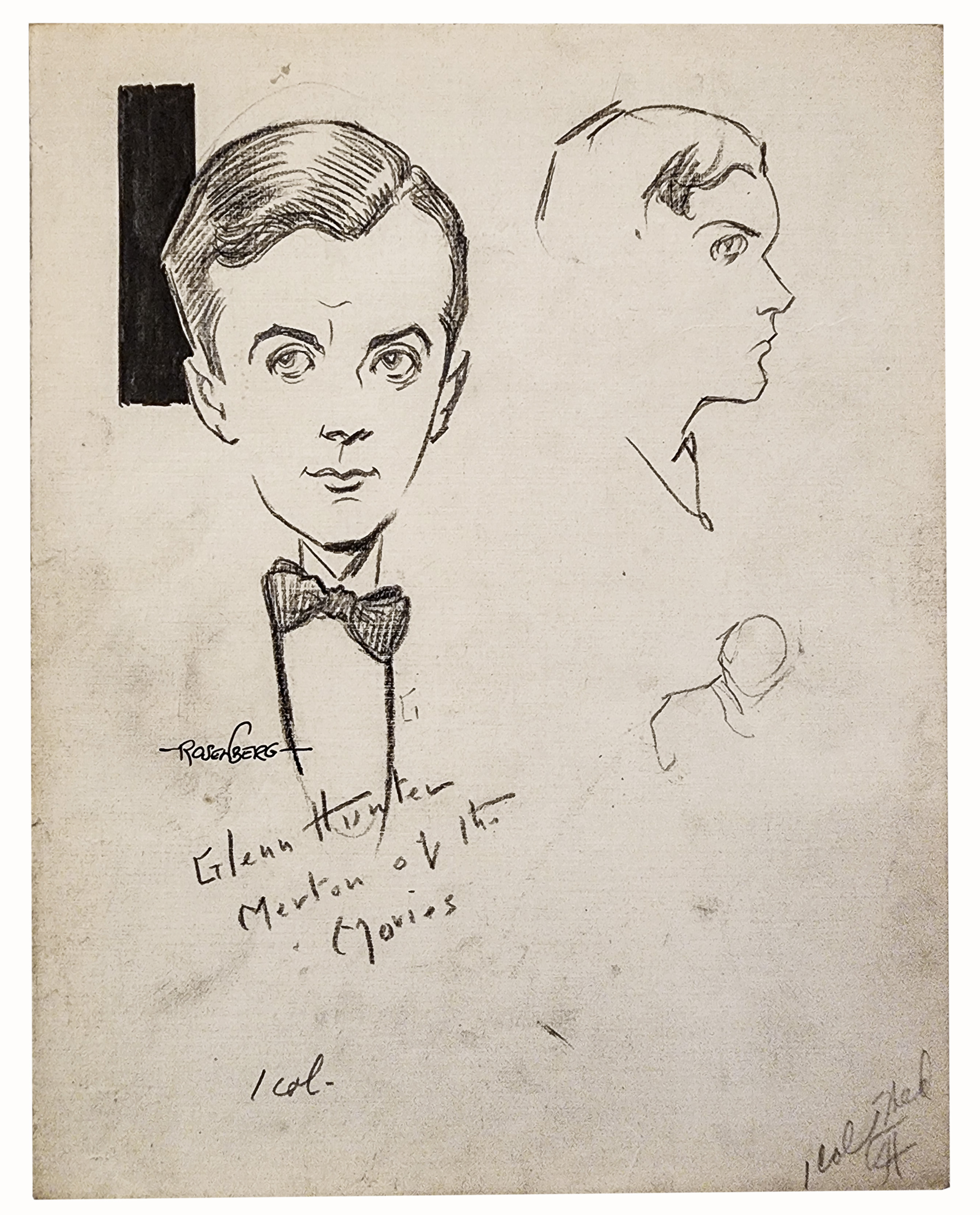
Signed drawing of Glenn Hunter by Manuel Rosenberg for Cincinnati Post 1925

Glenn Hunter (September 26, 1894 – December 30, 1945) was an American stage and silent film actor who gained popularity in the 1920s on the Broadway stage.

== Biography ==
His parents were Isiah T. Hunter and Sarah Glenn. Hunter began on Broadway appearing in plays from 1915. His first film was 1921's The Case of Becky, playing opposite Constance Binney, based on a 1912 stage play starring Frances Starr. In 1922, he was seen in Paramount's The Country Flapper with Dorothy Gish and the Hackett Brothers, Raymond and Albert.

In 1923, Hunter co-starred with Mary Astor in the costume film Puritan Passions. He had originated the role of Merton in the Broadway play Merton of the Movies (1922). In 1924, he made a silent film of the play released by Paramount Pictures. The film is now considered a sought after lost film.

Hunter died of cancer in New York.

Hunter was married to May Eagan.

== Selected filmography ==
- The Case of Becky (1921)
- The Country Flapper (1922)
- The Cradle Buster (1922)
- Smilin' Through (1922)
- Second Fiddle (1923)
- Puritan Passions (1923)
- Youthful Cheaters (1923)
- West of the Water Tower (1923)
- Merton of the Movies (1924)
- The Silent Watcher (1924)
- Grit (1924)
- His Buddy's Wife (1925)
- The Pinch Hitter (1925)
- The Little Giant (1926)
- The Broadway Boob (1926)
- The Romance of a Million Dollars (1926)
