= Dancers in the Dark =

1932 film by David Burton

- Directed by: David Burton
- Written by: Herman J. Mankiewicz adaptation Brian Marlow; Howard Emmett Rogers
- Based on: play Jazz King by James Ashmore Creelman
- Starring: Miriam Hopkins; Jack Oakie; George Raft
- Music by: Dana Suesse
- Distributed by: Paramount Pictures
- Release date: March 11, 1932
- Running time: 74 minutes
- Country: United States
- Language: English

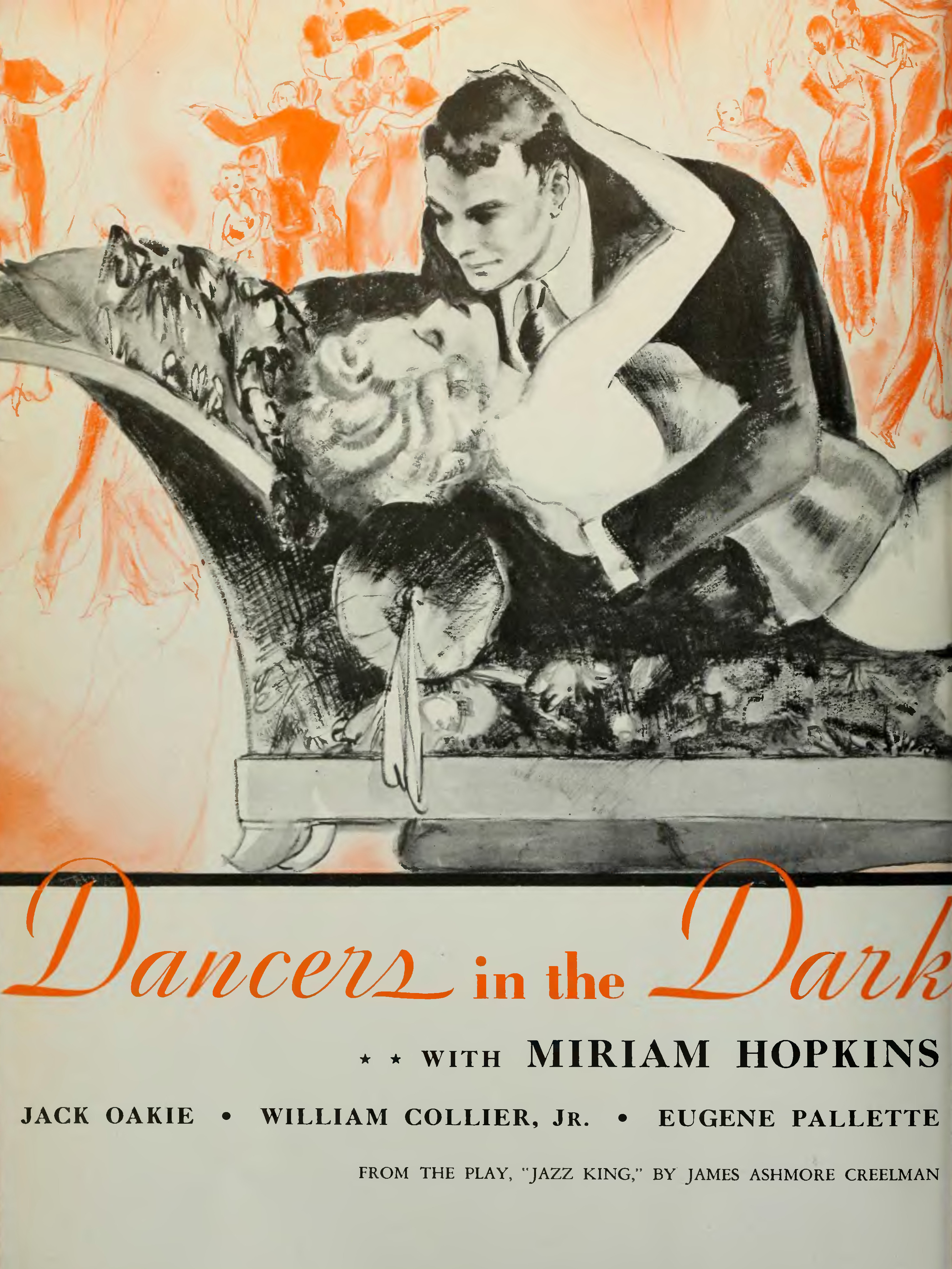
Dancers in the Dark ad in The Film Daily, 1932

Dancers in the Dark is a 1932 American pre-Code film about a taxi dancer (Miriam Hopkins), a big band leader (Jack Oakie), and a gangster (George Raft).

George Raft, billed sixth, was listed much lower in the cast than the size of his role indicated because he was at the dawn of his career. His part was as large as any of the other players except for Hopkins and arguably Oakie. The same thing had happened to Raft previously in his earlier film Quick Millions, a gangster vehicle starring Spencer Tracy, in which Raft's role was extremely large and colorful, even featuring some dancing.

== Plot ==
At a downtown dance hall, Duke Taylor is the band leader, Gloria Bishop the singer, Floyd Stevens the saxophonist and Louie Brooks a local gangster and regular patron.

Gloria has a "past" with both Duke and Louie but as the film opens is falling for Floyd. Floyd is steady and true but might not be if he knew more about her romantic history. Duke thinks Gloria is not good enough for Floyd whom he treats as a brother. Louie is interested in having her back but not as much as he wants to rob premises upstairs from the dance hall.

Floyd proposes to Gloria; she accepts but is worried about her past and puts him off. Duke maneuvers him out of town for a few months and sets about luring Gloria back to him to expose her shallow nature. The ploy fails because he starts to fall in love with her as well. In the meantime the robbery takes place (off screen) and Louie kills someone but isn't caught. Floyd comes back and after a rapid sequence of misunderstandings and the arrival of the police looking for Louie everything works out nicely.

== Cast ==
- Miriam Hopkins as Gloria Bishop
- Jack Oakie as Duke Taylor
- William Collier, Jr. as Floyd Stevens
- Eugene Pallette as Gus
- Lyda Roberti as Fanny Zabowolski
- George Raft as Louie Brooks
- Paul Fix as Benny
- Adelaide Hall (Hall's singing voice is used but she is uncredited on the movie credits)

== Production ==
The film was based on a play The Jazz King by James Creelman who was better known as a screenwriter. In March 1929 it was announced the play would be put on next October. It was not produced on Broadway. In October 1931 Paramount bought screen rights to the play which was also known as St Louis Blues and Master of Ceremonies. The same month it was announced the film would star Miriam Hopkins and Charles Buddy Rogers. The film was conceived as a drama with musical interludes.

Filming started under the title The Jazz King.

Raft was later signed to a long-term contract by Paramount. He made it after Scarface but before that film was released.

== Reception ==
The New York Times called it "curiously tedious."
