= The Pinch Hitter (1925 film) =

1925 film by Joseph Henabery

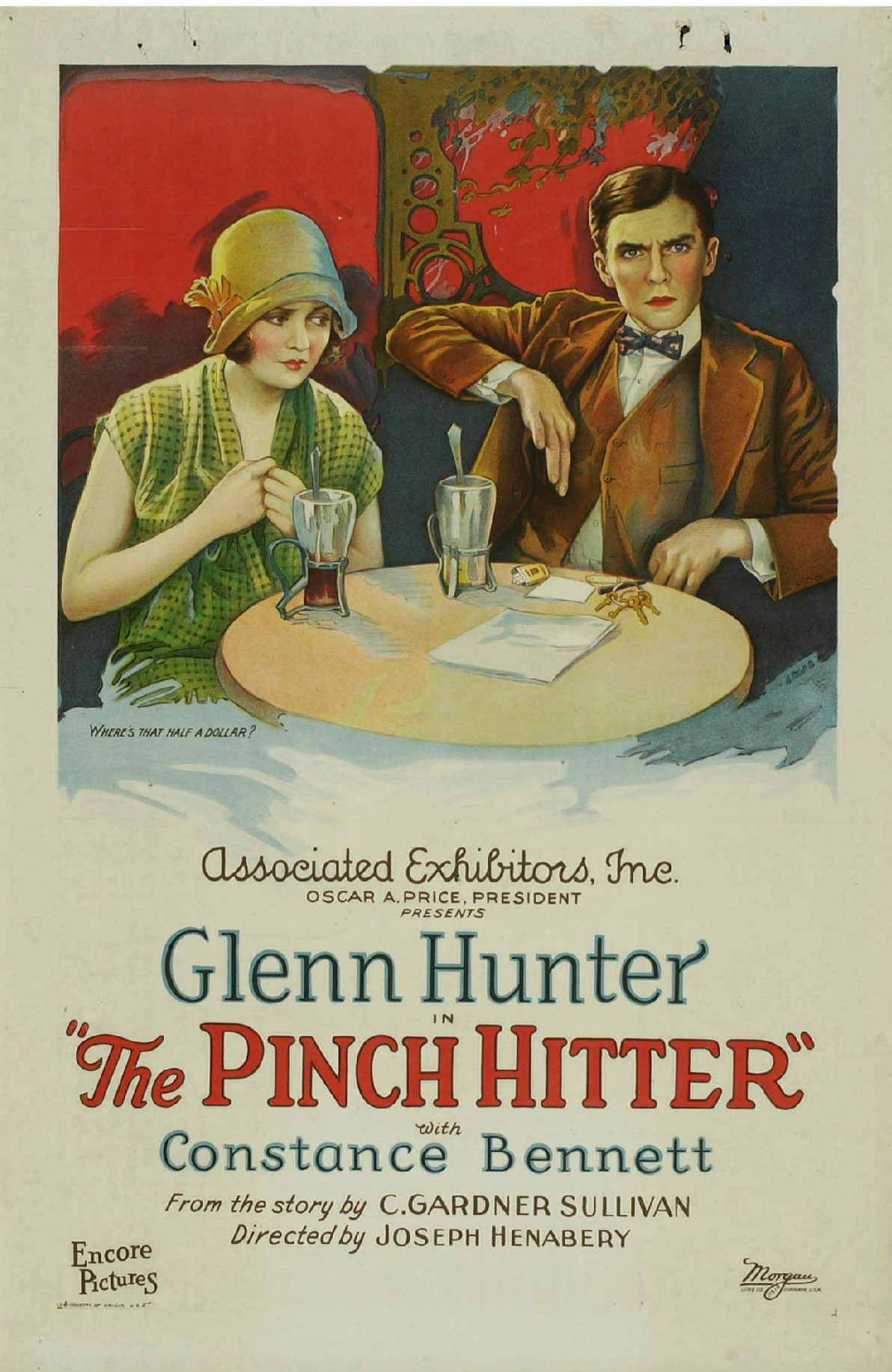
- A Baseball Story
- Directed by: Joseph Henabery
- Written by: C. Gardner Sullivan
- Starring: Glenn Hunter; Constance Bennett
- Cinematography: Jules Cronjager
- Distributed by: Associated Exhibitors
- Release date: December 13, 1925
- Running time: 70 minutes
- Country: United States
- Language: Silent (English intertitles)

The Pinch Hitter is a 1925 American silent sports comedy film directed by Joseph Henabery and starring Glenn Hunter and Constance Bennett. It is a remake of a 1917 film of the same name starring Charles Ray. It was produced and distributed by Associated Exhibitors. A print survives.

== Plot ==
As described in a film magazine review, Joel Martin, a small town youth who is a baseball fan, becomes the butt of everyone’s jokes at college, and the going becomes worse after he falls in love with the school’s favorite waitress. He is put on the school baseball team as mascot, but when he is sent in as pinch hitter, he wins the big game and the affection of the young woman.

== Cast ==
- Glenn Hunter as Joel Martin
- Constance Bennett as Abby Nettleton
- Jack Drumier as Obadiah Parker
- Reginald Sheffield as Alexis Thornton
- Antrim Short as Jimmy Slater
- George Cline as Coach Nolan
