= James Ashmore Creelman =

American screenwriter

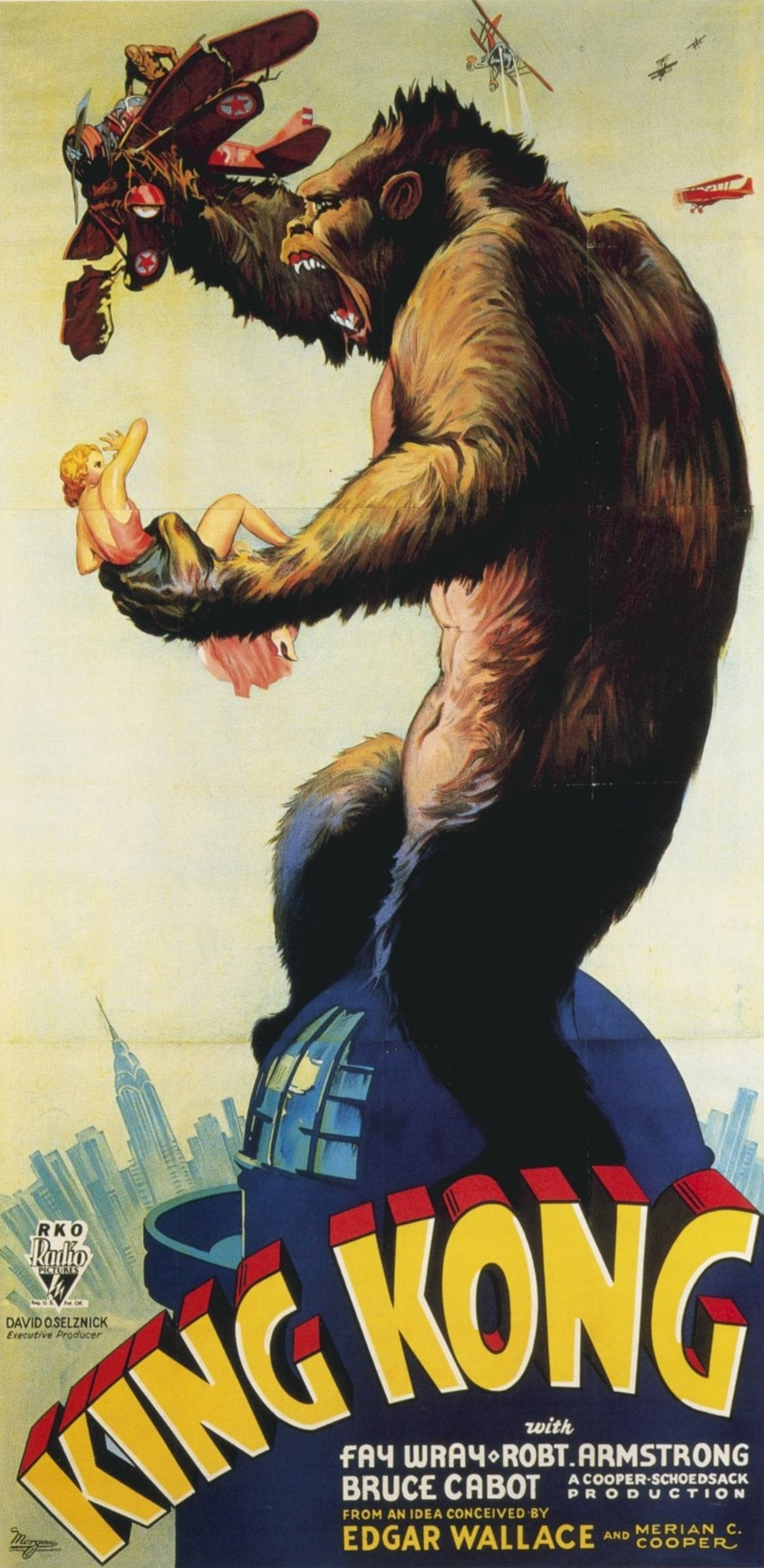
- King Kong (1933) was written by James Ashmore Creelman
- Born: James Ashmore Creelman; September 21, 1894; Marietta, Ohio, US
- Died: September 9, 1941 (aged 46); Manhattan, New York, US
- Education: Yale University
- Occupation: Screenwriter
- Employer: RKO
- Known for: The Last Days of Pompeii (1935); King Kong (1933); The Most Dangerous Game (1932); Dancers in the Dark (1932); The Untamed Lady (1926)
- Parent: James Creelman

James Ashmore Creelman (September 21, 1894 – September 9, 1941) was an American screenwriter in Hollywood, known for co-writing King Kong in 1933.

== Biography ==
He was born on September 21, 1894, in Marietta, Ohio. He was the second son of journalist James Creelman and Alice Leffingwell Buell. He had a sister, Eileen Creelman, who married Frederick Morgan Davenport Jr., son of New York congressman Frederick Morgan Davenport.

Creelman moved to New York City and then Washington, D.C. where his father worked as a journalist.

He was a graduate of Yale University, where he edited the campus humor magazine The Yale Record with Clements Ripley, writer of Jezebel.

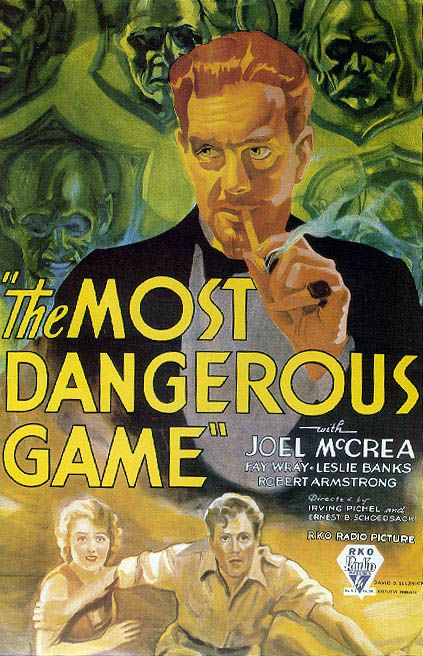
Pre-Code film The Most Dangerous Game (1932) was written by James Ashmore Creelman.

Creelman worked for RKO studios from 1929 and contributed to the storyline of many of the studios' early adventure and thriller films including The Untamed Lady, The Most Dangerous Game, King Kong, Dancers in the Dark and The Last Days of Pompeii.

Creelman began working in Hollywood in 1924 and wrote for 30 films before stopping in 1935. He also directed the 1927 film High Hat.

On September 9, 1941, twelve days before his 47th birthday, Creelman committed suicide by jumping off the roof garden at the top of a building on 325 E. 72nd Street in Manhattan, New York City, New York. He was pronounced dead at Metropolitan Hospital.

== Personal life ==
His paternal grandfather was born to Scots-Irish migrants to Montreal while his paternal grandmother was of Scottish descent. His mother was a native of Marietta, Ohio.
