= Lou Holtz (disambiguation) =

Lou Holtz may refer to:

- Lou Holtz (1937–2026), American football coach
  - His son, Lou Jr. (born 1964), also an American football coach, better known as Skip Holtz
- Lou Holtz (actor) (1893–1980), an American vaudevillian, comic actor, and theatrical producer
  - His son, Lou Jr., an American screenwriter of The Cable Guy (1996)
