= William Reynolds (film editor) =

American film editor

William H. Reynolds
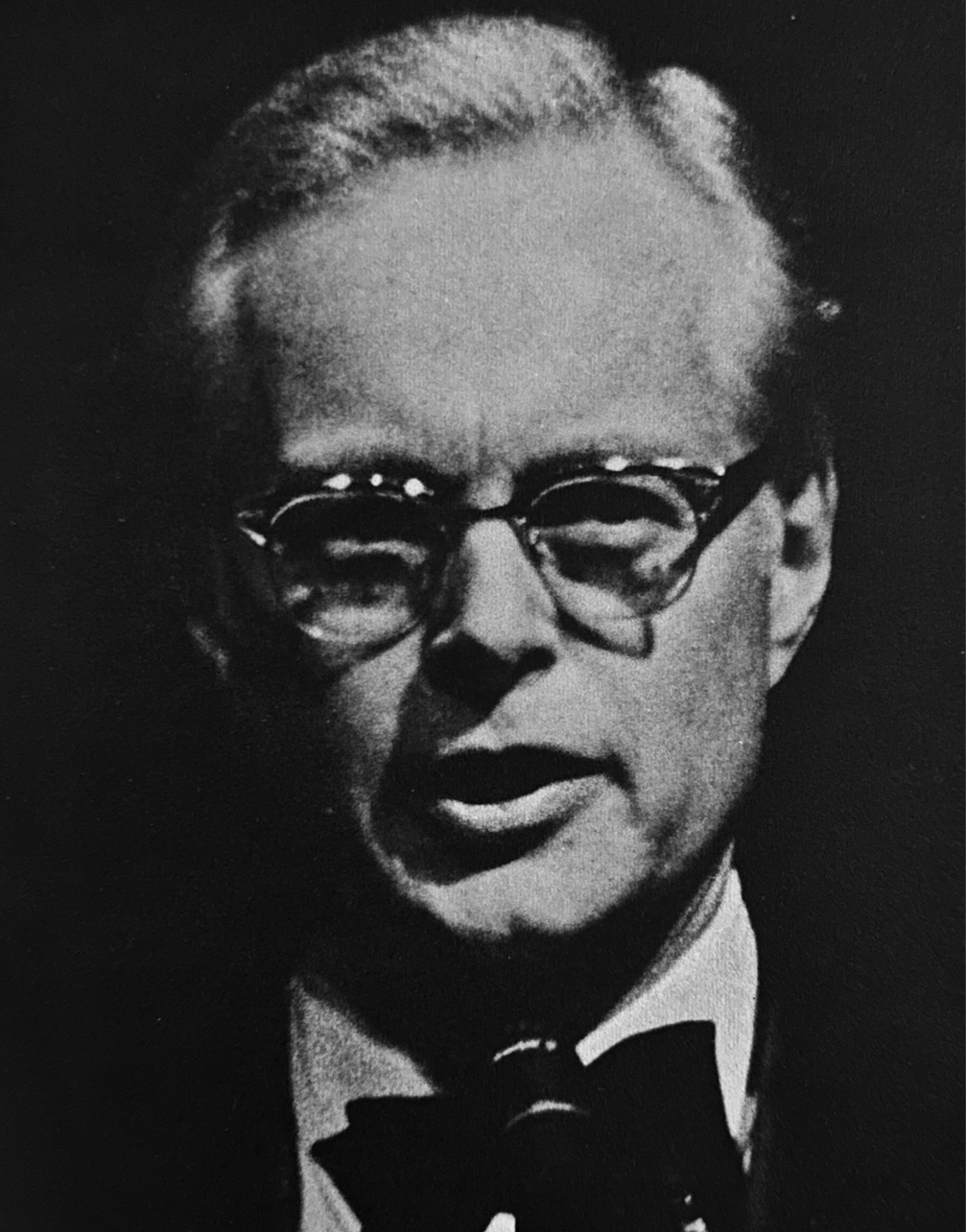
- Born: William Henry Reynolds; June 14, 1910; Elmira, New York, U.S.
- Died: July 16, 1997 (aged 87); South Pasadena, California, U.S.
- Education: Princeton University
- Occupation: Film editor

William Henry Reynolds (June 14, 1910 – July 16, 1997) was an American film editor whose career spanned six decades. His credits include notable films such as The Sound of Music, The Godfather, The Sting, and The Turning Point. He also was associated with two box-office bombs, Ishtar and Heaven's Gate, which he was the executive producer.

== Biography ==
Born in Elmira, New York, Reynolds began his career in 1934 as a member of the swing gang at 20th Century Fox. He became a protégé of film editor Robert Simpson, who brought him to Paramount Pictures as his assistant in 1936. The following year, he edited his first project, the musical film 52nd Street. In 1942, he joined 20th Century Fox, where he remained for 28 years. It was there that he frequently collaborated with two notable directors. His wartime service put a temporary halt to his career. However, he did manage to sustain continuity by editing U.S. Army training films from 1942 to 1946. For Robert Wise, he edited The Day the Earth Stood Still, The Sound of Music, The Sand Pebbles, Star!, and Two People. His work for Joshua Logan included Bus Stop, Fanny, and Ensign Pulver.

Additional credits include Algiers; Come to the Stable; Beneath the 12-Mile Reef; Three Coins in the Fountain; Good Morning, Miss Dove; Love Is a Many-Splendored Thing; Carousel; Compulsion; Wild River; Taras Bulba; Hello, Dolly!; The Great White Hope; The Great Waldo Pepper; Nijinsky; Author! Author!; The Little Drummer Girl; Newsies; and the television adaptation of Gypsy.

Reynolds died of cancer in South Pasadena, California at the age of 87.

== Filmography ==
Editor
| Year | Film | Director | Notes |
|---|---|---|---|
| 1937 | 52nd Street | Harold Young | |
| 1938 | Algiers | John Cromwell | First collaboration with John Cromwell |
| 1941 | So Ends Our Night | John Cromwell | Second collaboration with John Cromwell |
| 1942 | Moontide | Archie Mayo | |
| 1947 | Carnival in Costa Rica | Gregory Ratoff | |
| 1948 | You Were Meant for Me | Lloyd Bacon | First collaboration with Lloyd Bacon |
| 1948 | Give My Regards to Broadway | Lloyd Bacon | Second collaboration with Lloyd Bacon |
| 1948 | The Street with No Name | William Keighley | |
| 1949 | Mother Is a Freshman | Lloyd Bacon | Third collaboration with Lloyd Bacon |
| 1949 | Come to the Stable | Henry Koster | First collaboration with Henry Koster |
| 1950 | The Big Lift | George Seaton | |
| 1951 | Halls of Montezuma | Lewis Milestone | |
| 1951 | The Frogmen | Lloyd Bacon | Fourth collaboration with Lloyd Bacon |
| 1951 | Take Care of My Little Girl | Jean Negulesco | First collaboration with Jean Negulesco |
| 1951 | The Day the Earth Stood Still | Robert Wise | First collaboration with Robert Wise |
| 1952 | Red Skies of Montana | Joseph M. Newman | First collaboration with Joseph M. Newman |
| 1952 | The Outcasts of Poker Flat | Joseph M. Newman | Second collaboration with Joseph M. Newman |
| 1953 | The Kid from Left Field | Harmon Jones | |
| 1953 | Dangerous Crossing | Joseph M. Newman | Third collaboration with Joseph M. Newman |
| 1953 | Beneath the 12-Mile Reef | Robert D. Webb | |
| 1954 | Three Coins in the Fountain | Jean Negulesco | Second collaboration with Jean Negulesco |
| 1954 | Désirée | Henry Koster | Second collaboration with Henry Koster |
| 1955 | Daddy Long Legs | Jean Negulesco | Third collaboration with Jean Negulesco |
| 1955 | Love Is a Many-Splendored Thing | Henry King | First collaboration with Henry King |
| 1955 | Good Morning, Miss Dove | Henry Koster | Third collaboration with Henry Koster |
| 1956 | Carousel | Henry King | Second collaboration with Henry King |
| 1956 | Bus Stop | Joshua Logan | First collaboration with Joshua Logan |
| 1958 | In Love and War | Philip Dunne | First collaboration with Philip Dunne |
| 1959 | Compulsion | Richard Fleischer | |
| 1959 | Blue Denim | Philip Dunne | Second collaboration with Philip Dunne |
| 1959 | Beloved Infidel | Henry King | Third collaboration with Henry King |
| 1960 | Wild River | Elia Kazan | |
| 1961 | Fanny | Joshua Logan | Second collaboration with Joshua Logan |
| 1962 | Tender Is the Night | Henry King | Fourth collaboration with Henry King |
| 1962 | Taras Bulba | J. Lee Thompson | First collaboration with J. Lee Thompson |
| 1963 | Kings of the Sun | J. Lee Thompson | Second collaboration with J. Lee Thompson |
| 1964 | Ensign Pulver | Joshua Logan | Third collaboration with Joshua Logan |
| 1965 | The Sound of Music | Robert Wise | Second collaboration with Robert Wise |
| 1966 | Our Man Flint | Daniel Mann | |
| 1966 | The Sand Pebbles | Robert Wise | Third collaboration with Robert Wise |
| 1968 | Star! | Robert Wise | Fourth collaboration with Robert Wise |
| 1969 | Hello, Dolly! | Gene Kelly | |
| 1970 | The Great White Hope | Martin Ritt | |
| 1971 | What's the Matter with Helen? | Curtis Harrington | |
| 1972 | The Godfather | Francis Ford Coppola | |
| 1973 | Two People | Robert Wise | Fifth collaboration with Robert Wise |
| 1973 | The Sting | George Roy Hill | First collaboration with George Roy Hill |
| 1975 | The Great Waldo Pepper | George Roy Hill | Second collaboration with George Roy Hill |
| 1975 | The Master Gunfighter | Tom Laughlin | |
| 1977 | The Turning Point | Herbert Ross | Second collaboration with Herbert Ross |
| 1979 | Old Boyfriends | Joan Tewkesbury | |
| 1979 | A Little Romance | George Roy Hill | Third collaboration with George Roy Hill |
| 1980 | Nijinsky | Herbert Ross | Third collaboration with Herbert Ross |
| 1980 | Heaven's Gate | Michael Cimino | |
| 1982 | Making Love | Arthur Hiller | First collaboration with Arthur Hiller |
| 1982 | Author! Author! | Arthur Hiller | Second collaboration with Arthur Hiller |
| 1983 | Yellowbeard | Mel Damski | |
| 1984 | The Lonely Guy | Arthur Hiller | Third collaboration with Arthur Hiller |
| 1984 | The Little Drummer Girl | George Roy Hill | Fourth collaboration with George Roy Hill |
| 1986 | Pirates | Roman Polanski | |
| 1987 | Ishtar | Elaine May | |
| 1987 | Dancers | Herbert Ross | Fourth collaboration with Herbert Ross |
| 1988 | A New Life | Alan Alda | |
| 1989 | Rooftops | Robert Wise | Sixth collaboration with Robert Wise |
| 1990 | Taking Care of Business | Arthur Hiller | Fourth collaboration with Arthur Hiller |
| 1992 | Newsies | Kenny Ortega | |
| 1996 | Carpool | Arthur Hiller | Fifth collaboration with Arthur Hiller |

Editorial department
| Year | Film | Director | Role | Notes | Other notes |
|---|---|---|---|---|---|
| 1935 | The Gay Deception | William Wyler | Apprentice editor | | Uncredited |
| 1936 | Her Master's Voice | Joseph Santley | Assistant editor | | Uncredited |
| 1936 | Big Brown Eyes | Raoul Walsh | Assistant editor | First collaboration with Raoul Walsh | Uncredited |
| 1936 | Palm Springs | Aubrey Scotto | Assistant editor | | Uncredited |
| 1936 | Spendthrift | Raoul Walsh | Assistant editor | Second collaboration with Raoul Walsh | Uncredited |
| 1976 | The Seven-Per-Cent Solution | Herbert Ross | Supervising editor | First collaboration with Herbert Ross | |

Producer
| Year | Film | Director | Credit |
|---|---|---|---|
| 1957 | Time Limit | Karl Malden | Producer |

Production manager
| Year | Film | Director | Role |
|---|---|---|---|
| 1980 | Heaven's Gate | Michael Cimino | Executive in charge of post-production |

Documentaries

Editor
| Year | Film | Director | Notes |
|---|---|---|---|
| 1946 | Let There Be Light | John Huston | Uncredited |

TV movies

Editor
| Year | Film | Director |
|---|---|---|
| 1975 | The Entertainer | Donald Wrye |
| 1993 | Gypsy | Emile Ardolino |

== Awards and listings ==
Reynolds was nominated for the Academy Award for Best Film Editing seven times and won for The Sound of Music and The Sting. He received the American Cinema Editors Career Achievement Award in 1991.

In 2012, the Motion Picture Editors Guild published a list of the best-edited films of all time. Two films edited by Reynolds appeared on the list. The Godfather was ranked sixth and The Sound of Music was sixty-fourth.

== See also ==
- List of film director and editor collaborations
