= The Professional Guest =

1931 film

- Directed by: George King
- Written by: William Garrett (novel); Harry Fowler Mear
- Produced by: Harry Cohen
- Starring: Gordon Harker; Pat Paterson; Richard Bird
- Cinematography: Geoffrey Faithfull
- Production companies: George King Productions; Fox Film Corporation
- Distributed by: Fox Film Company
- Release date: 1931
- Running time: 42 minutes
- Country: United Kingdom
- Language: English

The Professional Guest is a 1931 British comedy film directed by George King and starring Gordon Harker, Pat Paterson and Richard Bird. It was written by Harry Fowler Mear based on the 1928 novel of the same title by William Garrett, and was made at Walton Studios as a quota quickie for release by Fox Film.

== Preservation status ==
The British Film Institute National Archive holds a collection of stills but no film or video materials.

== Plot ==
John Singleton Howard, a cultured and refined young gentleman, sets himself up as a social advisor. He is engaged by Sir Alfred and Lady Phibsby, a wealthy, self-made couple, to organise a high-profile dinner party. Disaster strikes when the guest of honour, a famous explorer, fails to arrive. To save the evening, John persuades his cockney manservant Joe to step into the breach. Joe masquerades as Mostyn Manning, an even more celebrated explorer, and through his antics accidentally thwarts a crook who was planning to rob the Phibsby home.

== Cast ==
- Gordon Harker as Joe
- Pat Paterson as Marjorie Phibsby
- Richard Bird as John Singleton Howard, The Guest
- Garry Marsh as Seton Fanshawe
- Barbara Gott as Lady Phibsby
- Hay Plumb as Sir Alfred Phibsby
- Syd Crossley as Crump

== Reception ==
Film Weekly wrote: "The film is an unassuming but fairly entertaining comedy, which is mainly an excuse for Gordon Harker to give one of his typical Cockney characterisations. It: also shows us that Pat Paterson is a young lady with possibilities and some personality."

The Daily Film Renter wrote: "Gordon Harker ... is the only really bright spot. ... There are obvious traces of hurried production, and if more time and grey matter had been applied to the story in the first place, the film would have got more laughs than are likely to be secured by some of the gags, which were old before films were invented. .... Crude stuff, crudely handled."

Kine Weekly wrote: "Ingenuous light comedy which relies on a characteristic Cockney portrayal by Gordon Harker for its entertainment. The story is thin and vague, and the supporting cast is seldom given an opportunity to show its talents. The quality, however, is good. ... Although the quality of the entertainment never reaches a high standard, the picture is, by reason of its length, suitable as a supporting quota offering for the average hall."
