= Ruth Gillette =

American actress (1906–1994)

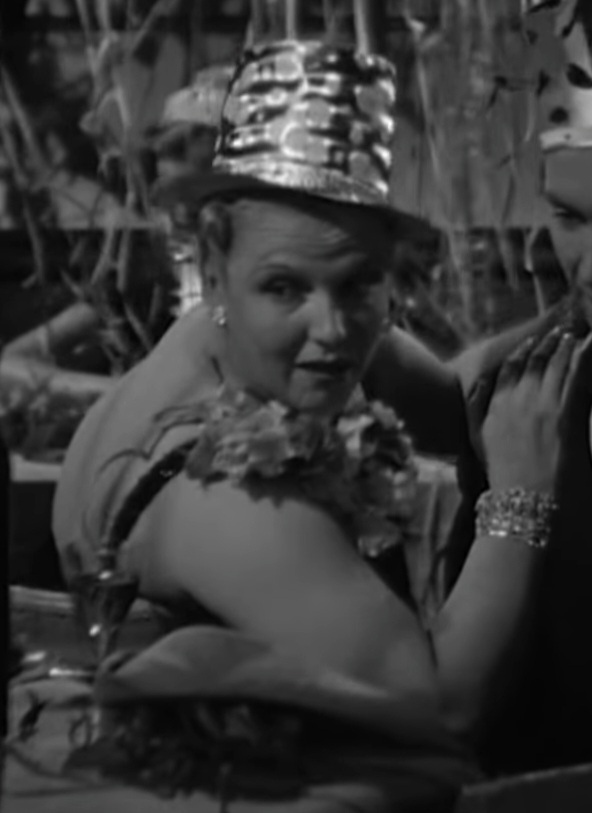
- Gillette in Made for Each Other (1939)
- Born: August 16, 1906; Chicago, Illinois, U.S.
- Died: May 13, 1994 (aged 87); Los Angeles, California, U.S.
- Occupation: Actress
- Years active: 1925–1986
- Spouse: Harry Archer
- Children: 1

Ruth Gillette (August 16, 1906 – May 13, 1994) was an American actress. She appeared in numerous films, TV series and theatrical productions from the 1920s to the 1980s.

== Early life ==
Gillette was born in Chicago in 1906, the daughter of Millard and Goldena Gillette.

== Career ==
Gillette started her career in 1925, acting mainly in musical comedy, debuting in the Broadway musical Gay Paree. During the 1930s she appeared in films like Stage Mother, Frontier Marshal (1939 film), David Harum, Three on a Honeymoon, Wild Gold, Convention Girl, Off to the Races, This Is My Affair, Saratoga and during the 1940s and 1950s she also appeared in films like The Postman Didn't Ring, Coney Island, Nob Hill and In a Lonely Place.

She also appeared in the Broadway productions Babes in Toyland, The Pajama Game, The Gazebo, and 70, Girls, 70.

She subsequently appeared in TV series like The Partridge Family, Madame's Place, Too Close for Comfort and The Facts of Life during the 1970s and 1980s.

== Personal life ==
Gillette was married to composer Harry Archer, they had one son, Robert Gillette Robbins. Archer died in 1960.

On May 13, 1994, Gillette died of lung cancer in Los Angeles, California. Gillette was 87 years old. Gillette was cremated.

== Filmography ==
=== Film ===
- Stage Mother (1933) - Blonde (uncredited)
- Frontier Marshal (1934) - Queenie LaVerne
- David Harum (1934) - Lillian Russell (uncredited)
- Three on a Honeymoon (1934) - Mrs. Foster (uncredited)
- I Believed in You (1934) - Woman in Cafe (uncredited)
- Wild Gold (1934) - Dixie Belle
- Woman in the Dark (1934) - Lil Logan
- Life Begins at 40 (1935) - Mrs. Cotton
- Convention Girl (1935) - Helen Shalton
- Silk Hat Kid (1935) - First Tart (uncredited)
- Navy Wife (1935) - Jenny (uncredited)
- The Spanish Cape Mystery (1935) - Laura Constable
- The Great Ziegfeld (1936) - Lillian Russell (uncredited)
- San Francisco (1936) - Earthquake Survivor (uncredited)
- The Gentleman from Louisiana (1936) - Lillian Russell
- Bulldog Edition (1936) - Jailhouse Gertie (uncredited)
- Off to the Races (1937) - Rosabelle
- This Is My Affair (1937) - Blonde
- Saratoga (1937) - Mrs. Pearl Hurley (uncredited)
- Wife, Doctor and Nurse (1937) - Ex-Follies Girl (uncredited)
- In Old Chicago (1938) - Miss Lou
- Rebecca of Sunnybrook Farm (1938) - Melba
- Josette (1938) - Belle
- The Chaser (1938) - Mrs. Olaf Olson
- The Man from Music Mountain (1938) - Madam Fatima (uncredited)
- Slander House (1938) - Mme. Renault
- Pride of the Navy (1939) - Undetermined Role (uncredited)
- Made for Each Other (1939) - Tipsy Blonde at New Year's Eve Party (uncredited)
- The Return of the Cisco Kid (1939) - Flora
- Little Accident (1939) - Woman (uncredited)
- The Monster and the Girl (1941) - Wedding Witness (uncredited)
- For Beauty's Sake (1941) - Fat Woman (uncredited)
- Small Town Deb (1942) - Clerk
- The Postman Didn't Ring (1942) - Secretary (uncredited)
- Street of Chance (1942) - Blonde (uncredited)
- Hello, Frisco, Hello (1943) - Singer (uncredited)
- Coney Island (1943) - Saloon Patron (uncredited)
- Nob Hill (1945) - uncredited
- Everybody Does It (1949) - Mrs. Craig (uncredited)
- In a Lonely Place (1950) - Martha (uncredited)
- The Shaggy D.A. (1976) - Song Chairman
- Going Ape! (1981) - Marianne

=== Television ===
- Dennis the Menace - The Lost Dog (1963) TV Episode .... Mrs. Morton
- The Partridge Family - The Last of Howard (1973) TV Episode .... Mrs. Milstead
- Madame's Place - Episode 1.21 (1982) TV Episode .... Mrs. Stewart, III
- Too Close for Comfort - Don't Rock The Boat (1983) TV Episode .... Mrs. Wrigley
- The Facts of Life - Two Guys from Appleton (1985) TV Episode .... Ruth - Grand Opening (1985) TV Episode .... Ruth - Out of Peekskill: Part 1 (1986) TV Episode .... Ruth - Out of Peekskill: Part 2 (1986) TV Episode .... Ruth

=== Stage ===
- Gay Paree (1925)
- Babes in Toyland (1930)
- The Pajama Game (1954)
- The Gazebo (1958)
- 70, Girls, 70 (1971)
