= Rose of the Rancho (1936 film) =

1936 film by Marion Gering

- Theatrical release poster
- Directed by: Marion Gering
- Screenplay by: Frank Partos; Charles Brackett; Nat Perrin; Arthur Sheekman; David Belasco (play); Richard Walton Tully
- Produced by: William LeBaron
- Starring: John Boles; Gladys Swarthout; Charles Bickford; Grace Bradley; Willie Howard; Herb Williams
- Cinematography: Leo Tover
- Edited by: Hugh Bennett
- Music by: Erich Wolfgang Korngold
- Production company: Paramount Pictures
- Distributed by: Paramount Pictures
- Release date: January 10, 1936
- Running time: 85 minutes
- Country: United States
- Language: English

Rose of the Rancho is a 1936 American western action film directed by Marion Gering and written by Frank Partos, Charles Brackett, Nat Perrin and Arthur Sheekman, adapted from the play of the same name by David Belasco and Richard Walton Tully. The film stars John Boles, Gladys Swarthout, Charles Bickford, Grace Bradley, Willie Howard and Herb Williams. It was released on January 10, 1936, by Paramount Pictures.

== Plot summary ==
Joe Kincaid, the leader of an organised gang of land-grabbers, is taking advantage of a loophole in the law to appropriate land in California in 1852. California has only recently been surrendered by Mexico to the United States to be admitted to the union. Joe uses the loophole in the law, whereby the title-deeds of current landowners are not recognised, to claim the legitimate plunder of the land. The law was unable to cope with the conflict created by the outlaws, and many of the landowners lost their homes and means.

Rosita Castro, the daughter of landowner Don Pasqual Castro, disguises herself as a man and organises a band of vigilantes to fight back against the cruelty of the outlaws. Rosita is aided by an undercover federal agent called Jim Kearny.

== Cast ==
- John Boles as Jim Kearney
- Gladys Swarthout as Rosita Castro aka Don Carlos
- Charles Bickford as Joe Kincaid
- Grace Bradley as Flossie
- Willie Howard as Pancho Spiegelgass
- Herb Williams as Phineas P. Jones
- H. B. Warner as Don Pasqual Castro
- Charlotte Granville as Doña Petrona
- Don Alvarado as Don Luis Espinosa
- Minor Watson as Jonathan Hill
- Louise Carter as Guadalupe
- Pedro de Cordoba as Gomez
- Paul Harvey as Boss Martin
- Arthur Aylesworth as Sheriff James
- Harry Woods as Bull Bangle
- Benny Baker as Hill-Billy Boy
- Russell Hopton as Frisco

== Production ==
Rose of the Rancho is one of five movies produced by Paramount in the 1930s featuring Gladys Swarthout, a very popular Metropolitan Opera mezzo-soprano. The studio was attempting to build on the popularity of Grace Moore, another opera singer, who had also expanded her talents into movies.

== Reception ==
Andre Sennwald of The New York Times said, "Gladys Swarthout's voice can be heard, if you listen carefully, above the groans and bone-creakings of the plot in Rose of the Rancho at the Paramount Theatre. With an ambitiousness that must have seemed more plausible in the studio conferences than in the pre-view room, Paramount has converted David Belasco's ancient hack-piece into an elaborate musical horse opera. It is the misfortune of the film that, instead of combining the most fascinating qualities of operetta and the six-shooter drama, it merely accents the weaknesses of both forms in one handsome blur."

Writing for The Spectator in 1936, Graham Greene gave the film a mildly negative review. Greene praised the acting of Gladys Swarthmore, but criticized the acting of John Boles as "particularly unsympathetic". Speaking favorably, Greene noted that "it is without [] bogus seriousness, [] artiness, [and] pomposity", however his ultimate conclusion was that it was "a very long way indeed from being a good film".

== See also ==
- Give Us This Night (1936)
- Champagne Waltz (1937)
- Romance in the Dark (1938)
- Ambush (1939)
