= Harry Green (actor) =

American actor (1892–1958)

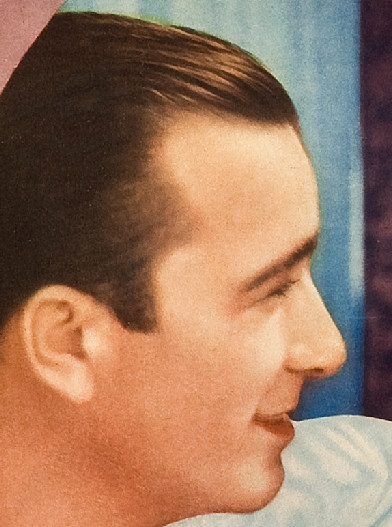
- Born: Henry Blitzer; April 1, 1892; New York, New York, US
- Died: May 31, 1958 (aged 66); Edgware, England
- Occupation: Actor
- Spouse: Alva Larsen

Harry Green (April 1, 1892 – May 31, 1958) was an actor in vaudeville, films, and television in the United States and Britain. He worked for Paramount Pictures and then Fox Film. He portrayed Jewish characters. He also performed as a magician and authored Harry Green Says You Are a Magician.

== Biography ==
Harry Green was born in New York as Henry Blitzer on April 1, 1892. He trained as a lawyer before working as an actor in vaudeville in the U.S., then films, and them in England. In the 1910s he performed as part of Ross & Green. Their repertoire included "The Hebrew Jockey and the Sport". He went solo performing the one-act satirical play The Cherry Tree as a character named George Washington Cohen.

His wife's name was Alva and they had two children, David and Roland. He was Jewish.

He corresponded with Paul Swan.

He died in Edgware on May 31, 1958 after collapsing backstage at the televised play Poet's Corner.

== Filmography ==
- Close Harmony (1929) as Max Mindel
- Why Bring That Up? (1929) as Irving
- The Man I Love (1929) as Curly Bloom
- The Kibitzer (1930) as Ike Laxarus, a Paramount film
- Honey (1930) as J. William Burnstein
- Sea Legs (1930) as Gabriel Grabowski
- Be Yourself! (1930) as Harry Field
- The Spoilers (1930) as Herman
- True to the Navy (1930) as Solomon Bimberg
- Paramount on Parade (1930) as Isadore the Toreador
- No Limit (1931) as Maxie Mindil
- This Day and Age (1933) as Herman
- Too Much Harmony (1933) as Max Merlin
- Mr. Skitch (1933) as Sam Cohen
- Wild Gold (1934) as J. "Jake" Lorillard Pushkin
- Bottoms Up (1934)
- Born to Be Bad (1934) as Adolphe
- She Learned About Sailors (1934) as Jose Pedro Alesandro Lopez Rubinstein
- Love Time (1934) as Adam
- Coming Out Party (1934) as Harry Gold
- The Cisco Kid and the Lady (1939) as Teasdale
- Star Dust (1940) as Bird man
- A King in New York (1957) King Shahdov's Attorney

=== British ===
- Marry Me (1932)
- A Date with a Dream (1948) as Syd Marlish
- Glad Tidings (1953) as Golfer
- Joe MacBeth (1955) as Big Dutch
- Isidor Comes To Town (1954)
- Joe MacBeth (1955) as Big Dutch
- An Alligator Named Daisy (1955) as Irving J. Rosenbloom
- A King in New York (1957) as King Shahdov's Attorney
- Next to No Time (1958) as Saul Wiener
- Three Tough Guys, a television series
- Poet's Corner, television show; he died backstage during the shoot

== Theater ==
- Potash and Perlmutter as Perlmutter
