= John Boles (actor) =

American actor (1895–1969)

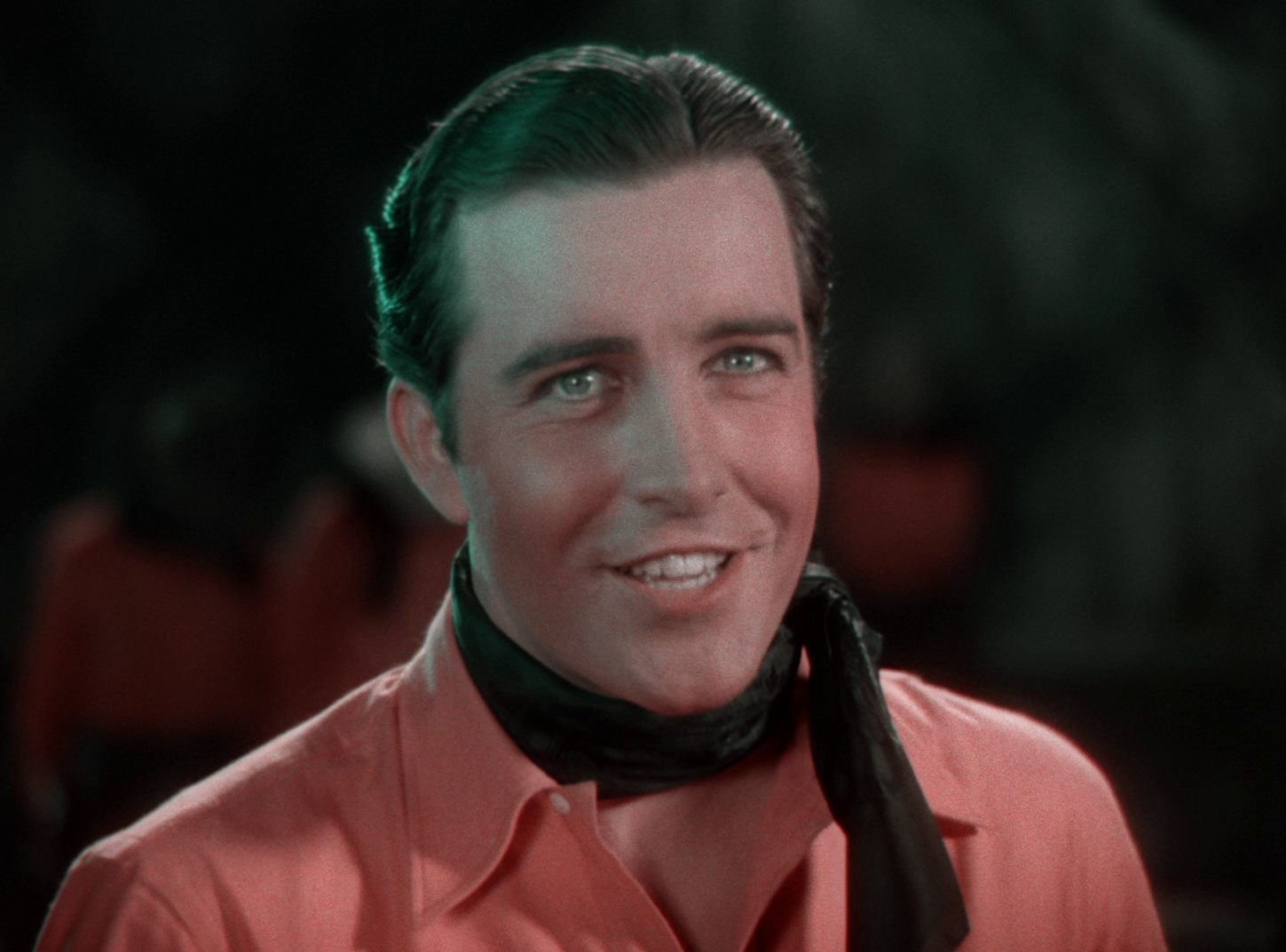
- Boles in King of Jazz (1930)
- Born: October 28, 1895; Greenville, Texas, U.S.
- Died: February 27, 1969 (aged 73); San Angelo, Texas, U.S.
- Occupations: Actor, singer
- Years active: 1922–1952
- Spouse: Marcelite Dobbs (m.1917–1969; his death)
- Children: 2

John Boles (October 28, 1895 – February 27, 1969) was an American singer and actor best known for playing Victor Moritz in the 1931 film Frankenstein.

== Early life ==
Boles was born in Greenville, Texas, to a middle-class family. He graduated from the University of Texas in 1917. (Note: Boles' obituary in the Chicago Tribune says, "World War I interrupted his premedical studies at the University of Texas. He never went back.") Boles served in the intelligence service of the U.S. Army during World War I. He returned to Greenville, where he was selected by an out-of-town producer to act in an opera at the King Opera House. This experience convinced John that he preferred music and the stage to the preference of his parents, who wanted him to pursue a medical degree.

While en route to a career as actor and singer, Boles earned a living by teaching French and singing in a high school in New York and working as business manager and interpreter for a one-year tour of Europe by a student group. The latter venture led to his studying under tenor Jean de Reszke.

== Career ==
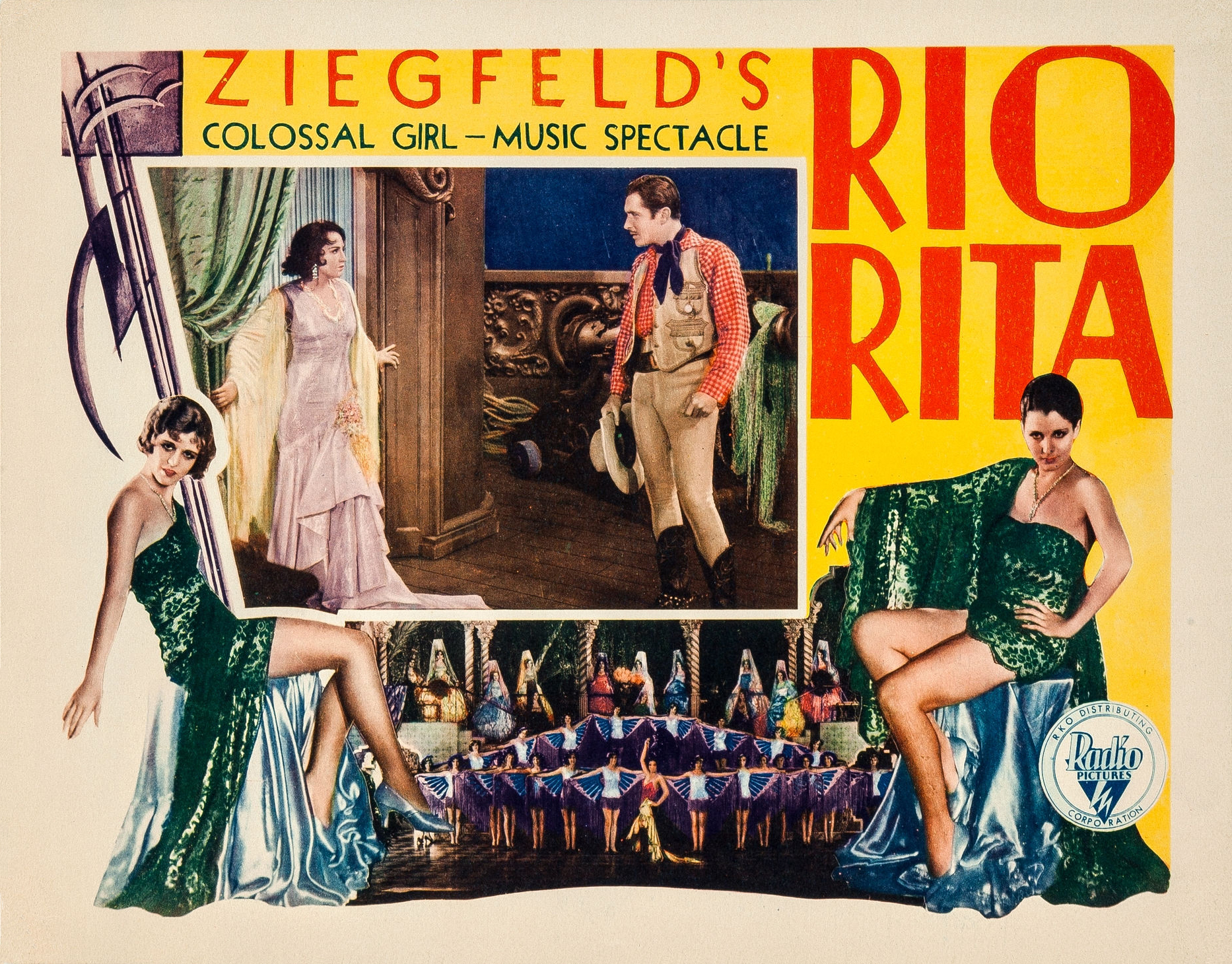
Lobby card for Rio Rita (1929)

He started out in Hollywood in silent movies, but became a huge star with the advent of talkies. After the war, Boles moved to New York City to study music. He quickly became well known for his talents and was selected to replace the leading man in the 1923 Broadway musical Little Jesse James. He became an established star on Broadway and attracted the attention of Hollywood producers and actors.

Boles' Broadway credits include One Touch of Venus (1943), Kitty's Kisses (1925), Mercenary Mary (1924), and Little Jessie James (1923).

He was hired by MGM to appear in a silent film in 1924. He starred in two more films for that studio before returning to New York City and the stage. In 1927, he returned to Hollywood to star in The Love of Sunya (1927) opposite Gloria Swanson, which was a big success for him. Unfortunately, because the movies were still silent, he was unable to show off his singing ability until late in the decade. In 1929, Warner Bros. hired him to star in their lavish musical operetta The Desert Song (1929). This film featured sequences in Technicolor and was a box-office success. Soon after, Radio Pictures (later known as RKO) selected him to play the leading man in their extravagant production (the last portion of the film was photographed in Technicolor) of Rio Rita, opposite Bebe Daniels. Audiences were enthralled by his beautiful voice, and John Boles suddenly found himself in huge demand. RCA Victor even hired him to make phonograph records of songs that he had sung in his films.

As soon as Rio Rita was completed, Boles went back to Warner Bros. as the leading man in an even more extravagant musical entitled Song of the West (1930) that was filmed entirely in Technicolor. Shortly after this film, Universal Pictures offered John Boles a contract, which he accepted. He starred in a number of pictures for them, most notably the all-Technicolor musical revue entitled The King of Jazz (1930) and a historical operetta entitled Captain of the Guard (1930). In 1931, he starred in One Heavenly Night (1931), which proved to be his last major musical.

Boles portrayed Victor Moritz in Frankenstein (1931). He starred with Irene Dunne in a 1934 film adaptation of Edith Wharton's 1920 novel The Age of Innocence directed for RKO Radio Pictures by Philip Moeller, and took the role of Edward Morgan in Curly Top (1935), starring Shirley Temple. In 1937, Boles starred alongside Barbara Stanwyck in the King Vidor classic Stella Dallas. In 1943, he co-starred with Mary Martin and Kenny Baker in One Touch of Venus.

== Later years and popularity after death ==
Boles retired from the screen and stage in 1952, after starring opposite Paulette Goddard in Babes in Baghdad. He later went into the oil business and lived the last 13 years of his life in San Angelo, Texas.

For his contributions to the film industry, Boles was inducted into the Hollywood Walk of Fame in 1960 with a motion pictures star located at 6530 Hollywood Boulevard.

His and LeRoy Shield's single "Romance" from Cameo Kirby was sampled by The Caretaker in the track "F1 Gradations of arm's length" for Everywhere at the End of Time Stage 3.

== Personal life and death ==
Boles married Marcelite Dobbs (1896–1982) in 1917, remaining married until his death. He died on February 27, 1969, in San Angelo, Texas, at age 73 from a heart attack.

== Partial filmography ==
- So This Is Marriage? (1924) - Uriah
- Excuse Me (1925) - Lt. Shaw
- The Love of Sunya (1927) - Paul Judson
- The Shepherd of the Hills (1928) - Young Matt
- We Americans (1928) - Hugh Bradleigh
- Fazil (1928) - John Clavering
- Virgin Lips (1928) - Barry Blake
- The Water Hole (1928) - Bert Durland
- Man-Made Women (1928) - John Payson
- Romance of the Underworld (1928) - Stephen Ransome
- The Bride of the Colorado (1928) - John Barrows
- The Last Warning (1929) - Richard Quayle
- The Desert Song (1929) - The Red Shadow
- Scandal (1929) - Maurice
- Rio Rita (1929) - Captain Jim Stewart
- Song of the West (1930) - Captain Stanton
- Captain of the Guard (1930) - Rouget de Lisle
- King of Jazz (1930) - Vocalist ('Song of the Dawn' / 'It Happened in Monterey')
- Resurrection (1931) - Prince Dmitri Nekhludoff
- Seed (1931) - Bart Carter
- Frankenstein (1931) - Victor Moritz
- Good Sport (1931) - Boyce Cameron
- Careless Lady (1932) - Stephen Illington
- Back Street (1932) - Walter D. Saxel
- Six Hours to Live (1932) - Karl Kranz
- Child of Manhattan (1933) - Paul Vanderkill
- My Lips Betray (1933) - King Rupert aka Captain von Linden
- Only Yesterday (1933) - James Stanton 'Jim' Emerson
- Beloved (1934) - Carl Hausmann
- I Believed in You (1934) - Michael Harrison
- Bottoms Up (1934) - Hal Reed
- Stand Up and Cheer! (1934) - Himself
- Wild Gold (1934) - Steve Miller
- The Life of Vergie Winters (1934) - John Shadwell
- The Age of Innocence (1934) - Newland Archer
- The White Parade (1934) - Ronald Hall III
- Music in the Air (1934) - Bruno Mahler
- Curly Top (1935) - Edward Morgan
- Orchids to You (1935) - Thomas Bentley
- Redheads on Parade (1935) - John Bruce
- The Littlest Rebel (1935) - Capt. Herbert Cary
- Rose of the Rancho (1936) - Jim Kearney
- A Message to Garcia (1936) - Lieutenant Andrew Rowan
- Craig's Wife (1936) - Walter Craig
- As Good as Married (1937) - Alexander Drew
- Stella Dallas (1937) - Stephen Dallas
- Fight for Your Lady (1937) - Robert Densmore
- She Married an Artist (1937) - Lee Thornwood
- Romance in the Dark (1938) - Antal Kovach
- Sinners in Paradise (1938) - Jim Taylor
- Road to Happiness (1941) - Jeff Carter
- Between Us Girls (1942) - Steven J. Forbes
- Thousands Cheer (1943) - Col. Bill Jones
- Babes in Bagdad (1952) - Hassan
- Muchachas de Bagdad (1952) - Hassan (final film role)
