= Ambush (1939 film) =

1939 film by Kurt Neumann

- Theatrical release poster
- Directed by: Kurt Neumann
- Screenplay by: Laura Perelman; S. J. Perelman
- Story by: Robert Ray
- Starring: Gladys Swarthout; Lloyd Nolan; William "Bill" Henry; William Frawley; Ernest Truex; Broderick Crawford
- Cinematography: William C. Mellor
- Edited by: Stuart Gilmore
- Music by: Gerard Carbonara; Floyd Morgan
- Production company: Paramount Pictures
- Distributed by: Paramount Pictures
- Release date: January 20, 1939
- Running time: 82 minutes
- Country: United States
- Language: English
- Budget: $200,000

Ambush is a 1939 American drama film directed by Kurt Neumann and written by Laura Perelman and S. J. Perelman. The film stars Gladys Swarthout, Lloyd Nolan, William "Bill" Henry, William Frawley, Ernest Truex and Broderick Crawford. The film was released on January 20, 1939, by Paramount Pictures.

== Plot ==
Four bandits rob a California bank, Gibbs, the mastermind, Sidney who is a gunman and Randall a blackballed airplane pilot.

Charlie Hartman is also part of the gang. They pulls off a daring robbery in broad daylight and flee with $98,000. Charlie's honest sister Jane ends up being taken hostage but manages to convey her dire need for help to a truck driver, Tony Andrews.

Tony attempts to help save Jane and, if possible, her brother as well. Pretending to help Gibbs and the thieves, he leaves clues for the police to follow. One of the crooks, Blue, is killed, after which another, Randall, attempts to escape after Charlie's guilty conscience causes a change of heart. Tony is able to free Jane from the clutches of Gibbs, after which he and Jane collect the reward and begin to plan a new life together.

== Cast ==
- Gladys Swarthout as Jane Hartman
- Lloyd Nolan as Tony Andrews
- William "Bill" Henry as Charlie Hartman
- William Frawley as Inspector J.L. Weber
- Ernest Truex as Mr. Gibbs
- Broderick Crawford as Randall
- Rufe Davis as Centerville Sheriff
- Richard Denning as Police Garage Mechanic
- John Hartley as Sidney Blue
- Antonio Moreno as Captain Mike Gonzalez
- Harry Fleischmann as Captain Bosen
- Clem Bevans as Pop Stebbins
- Max Hoffman Jr. as Motorcycle Officer Sam Moore
- Archie Twitchell as Bank Teller
- Jane Dewey as Mother at Restaurant
- Billy Lee as Boy at Restaurant
- Polly Moran as Cora
- Wade Boteler as Bank Guard Riley
- George Melford as Bank President Wales

Other uncredited cast members (alphabetically)

- Eddie Acuff as Bus Conductor
- Ethel Clayton as Bank Customer
- Raymond Hatton as Mosher - Hardware Storekeeper
- Al Hill as Deputy
- Robert Homans as Garage Watchman
- Olin Howland as Radio Actor (segment "Uncle Toby")
- Lew Kelly as Farmer
- Sammy McKim as Boy With Wagon
- Gene Morgan as Reporter
- James Pierce as Officer Mack McKelway
- Buddy Roosevelt as Reporter
- Dick Rush as Metzger
- Guy Usher as Detective at Mosher's
- Virginia Vale as Waitress at Restaurant
- Bryant Washburn as Reporter
- Clarence Wilson as Lafe, Centerville Storekeeper

== Production ==
Ambush is one of five film produced by Paramount in the 1930s featuring Gladys Swarthout, a very popular Metropolitan Opera mezzo-soprano. The studio was attempting to build on the popularity of Grace Moore, another opera singer, who had also expanded her talents into films.

== See also ==
- Rose of the Rancho (1936)
- Give Us This Night (1936)
- Champagne Waltz (1937)
- Romance in the Dark (1938)
