= Bottoms Up (1934 film) =

1934 film by David Butler

- Directed by: David Butler
- Written by: David Buster; Buddy G. DeSylva; Sid Silvers
- Produced by: Buddy G. DeSylva
- Starring: Spencer Tracy; Pat Paterson; John Boles; Sid Silvers; Herbert Mundin
- Cinematography: Arthur C. Miller
- Edited by: Irene Morra
- Music by: Howard Jackson (uncredited)
- Production company: Fox Film Corporation
- Distributed by: Fox Film Corporation
- Release date: April 13, 1934
- Running time: 85 minutes
- Country: United States
- Language: English

Bottoms Up is a 1934 American pre-Code musical comedy film made by Fox Film Corporation, and was directed by David Butler, who cowrote original story and screenplay with producer Buddy G. DeSylva and co-star Sid Silvers. The picture stars Spencer Tracy, Pat Paterson, John Boles and Herbert Mundin, and features Thelma Todd in a supporting role.

== Plot ==
At the premiere of Judith Marlowe's new film, Smoothie meets Wanda, an aspiring actress, Hal, a singing newspaper agent, and Limey, an impoverished Englishman and forger. Mingling outside, Wanda tells them that she has been dropped by her studio and is very discouraged. Smoothie brings her, Hal and Spud home, telling her that he will promote her, and assures Hal and Spud that he will help them make money, too. He hears her sing, and believes that that will be her ticket into movies. He tells Limey to set himself up as "Lord Brocklehurst", with Wanda as his daughter (faking a British accent). This will gain needed attention from film studios.

Limey, as "Lord Brocklehurst", and Wanda arrive by train, with Smoothie as their personal assistant, and Hal as "Reggie Morris", a singer; they are met by reporters. They check into a hotel, charging everything. The actress from the premiere visits and invites them to a large Hollywood party, where they flirt and mingle, making contacts and trying to find work. Limey obtains autographs from different actors. Wanda and Reggie sing and conduct for the company, attracting positive attention. Hal Reed, a famous actor, leaves drunk, saying that he wants to do something better. Wanda chases him outside and offers to drive him home. Mr. Wolf, his studio CEO, is horrified by his drunken behavior.

At Hal's home, he asks Wanda to make a nightcap for him; he drinks it while she says, "Bottom's Up". They talk while he falls asleep, and she leaves, confessing how much his roles have meant to her, and that he is very loved, both by the public and by her.

The next morning, Smoothie is concerned that no one has called to inquire about hiring any of them. Limey says that he has a premonition that Wolf will call the next day. He mails him a letter, saying that Hal Reed took an important man's daughter, a minor, to his apartment the night of the party, and that the press does not know. Wolf panics when he reads the letter, asks Hal who the girl was, and invites the Brocklehurst party to his office.

With Smoothie leading the conversation, Wolf decides to sign Wanda to a contract as "Wanda Gale", relieved that the studio is not being sued. "Lord Brocklehurst" is insulted when Mr. Wolf pooh-poohs his singing and signs Reggie to a stunt contract. Director Lane Worthing is alarmed at Wolf's hand being forced, and says that the studio should investigate, in case this is a criminal gang. Also alarmed, Wolf and Worthing tell Hal to romance Wanda to obtain information from her.

Judith is removed as the star of her film, replaced by Wanda, and she is furious. Worthing tells Limey that Wanda is a natural actress. Reggie is in the film as a knight. Wanda goes to lunch with Hal, refusing Smoothie's invitation. Hal takes Wanda on a moonlit sail, and tells her he is in love with her. They kiss, and she asks him if he would love her if she were not Lord Brocklehurst's daughter. He answers that he is in love with Wanda Gale.

Reggie attempts to ride a horse, which runs away from him. On looking up the Brocklehursts in Burke's Peerage, Worthing tells Wolfe that he cannot find them in the list. Smoothie tells Wolf that Limey always denied being Lord Brocklehurst, and that neither contract could be terminated, for both Wanda and Reggie signed them under their own names. Wolf denies this, but discovers that additional clauses were added to each contract in his handwriting (possibly forged by Limey, but unprovable). At this, Smoothie demands more for each actor, including cars to and from the set. Still in love with Wanda and determined to propose, he buys her an engagement ring.

When Judith finds out, she threatens Wanda and Limey, telling her that the only reason Hal has hung around is because she is "Lord Brocklehurst's daughter". Wanda declares that she is quitting, that she does not want a career, but Limey convinces her to stay. She sings and dances with Hal in a musical number for their next film. Hal tells her that he loves Wanda Gale, but she says that she will never believe him again because he was spying on her. She runs to her dressing room, where Smoothie is waiting to propose. Smoothie comforts Wanda, who says she never wants to see Hal again. He promises to take care of everything, and pockets his ring.

Smoothie finds Hal, who has started to drink. Smoothie challenges him about her. Hal says that it is guys like Smoothie, who run out on girls like Wanda when the infatuation fades, but men like him marry, and he would if Wanda would have him. Smoothie returns to Wanda to tell her the good news, and that he is leaving for San Francisco, asking for a kiss goodbye. She kisses him, and he leaves.

At the premiere of Wanda and Hal's film, Smoothie, Limey and Spud are sitting outside. Limey takes out his autograph book, saying that he still has signatures, and that they can do something with them. Smoothie throws it away, to Limey's horror. On the red carpet, Wolf brags that he signed Wanda to her contract. Hal and Wanda publicly thank Smoothie for his kindness to them.

== Cast ==
- Spencer Tracy as 'Smoothie' King
- Pat Paterson as Wanda Gale
- John Boles as Hal Reed
- Sid Silvers as Spud Mosco aka Reginald Morris
- Herbert Mundin as Limey Brook aka Lord Brocklehurst
- Thelma Todd as Judith Marlowe
- Robert Emmett O'Connor as Detective Rooney
- Dell Henderson as Lane Worthing
- Suzanne Kaaren as Wolf's Secretary
- Douglas Wood as Baldwin

== Songs ==
- "I'm Throwing My Love Away", music by Burton Lane, lyrics by Harold Adamson
- "Is I in Love? I Is", by J. Russel Robinson
- "Little Did I Dream", music by Burton Lane, lyrics by Harold Adamson
- "Turn On the Moon", music by Burton Lane, lyrics by Harold Adamson
- "Waitin' at the Gate for Katy", music by Richard A. Whiting, lyrics by Gus Kahn

== Reception ==
It received a favorable review from The New York Times critic Mordaunt Hall, who called it "a neat, carefree piece of work, which is helped greatly by Spencer Tracy, Pat Paterson, an English actress who here makes her American picture bow; Herbert Mundin, Harry Green, and, to a lesser extent, by John Boles", and noted that it "has its full share of honest humor and also several tuneful songs".

Nonetheless, it was a box-office disappointment for Fox.
