= You Said It =

1931 American musical

- Music: Harold Arlen
- Lyrics: Jack Yellen
- Book: Jack Yellen; Sid Silvers
- Productions: 1931 Broadway

You Said It is a musical by Harold Arlen (music) and Jack Yellen (lyrics) that uses a musical book by Yellen and Sid Silvers.
The musical opened at the Chanin's 46th Street Theatre in New York City on January 19, 1931, and ran for 192 performances. The production was directed by John Harwood, choreographed by Danny Dare, and used set designs by Donald Oenslager and Dale Stetson. The production notably launched the career of Lyda Roberti.

The cast included comedian Lou Holtz and Good News (musical) lead Mary Lawlor. Like Good News, the story was set at a college; in this case the fictional Kenton College.

== Songs Included ==
(All written by Arlen/Yellen, 1931)

- Alma Mater
- Beatin' The Blues
- Bright And Early
- Best Part College Days
- Harlem's Gone Collegiate
- If He Really Loves Me
- It's Different With Me
- Learn To Croon
- Sweet And Hot
- They Learn About Women From Me
- What Do We Care?
- What'd We Come To College For
- Where, Oh Where?
- While You Are Young
- You'll Do
- You Said It
