= Call It Luck =

1934 film by James Tinling

- Directed by: James Tinling
- Screenplay by: Dudley Nichols; Lamar Trotti
- Story by: George Marshall
- Produced by: John Stone; Winfield R. Sheehan
- Starring: Pat Paterson; Herbert Mundin; Charles Starrett
- Cinematography: Joseph A. Valentine
- Edited by: Alex Troffey
- Music by: Samuel Kaylin
- Production company: Fox Film Corporation
- Distributed by: Fox Film Corporation
- Release date: June 1, 1934
- Running time: 65 minutes
- Country: United States
- Language: English

Call It Luck is a 1934 American comedy film directed by James Tinling and written by Dudley Nichols and Lamar Trotti. The film stars Pat Paterson, Herbert Mundin and Charles Starrett. The film was released on June 1, 1934, by Fox Film Corporation. A review in Variety concluded that "Herbert Mundin steals the picture despite that Pat Paterson, whom Fox is trying to build up, is given every opportunity to snatch attention".

== Plot ==
London taxi driver Herbert Biggelwade wins a fortune on the sweepstake. He plans to established a home for destitute former cab drivers and their horses. He is scammed by confidence tricksters into buying an old cavalry horse which they pretend is the brother of the current Derby winner. With his niece Sam, a music hall performer, he travels to America. In New York he is soon separated from her and falls into the clutches of another gang of swindlers who con him out of the remainder of his money. All he has to his name is the horse, who he decides to enter into a major horse race.

== Cast ==
- Pat Paterson as Pat Laurie
- Herbert Mundin as Herbert Biggelwade
- Charles Starrett as Stan Russell
- Gordon Westcott as 'Lucky' Luke Bartlett
- Georgia Caine as Amy Lark
- Theodore von Eltz as Nat Underwood
- Reginald Mason as Lord Poindexter
- Ernest Wood as Sid Carter
- Ray Mayer as 'Brainwave' Flynn
- Susan Fleming as Alice Blue
- Jameson Thomas as Colonel Sir Ridley Quigley
- Ethel Griffies as Lady Poindexter
- Frederik Vogeding as Judge Schauzer
- Fred Malatesta as Judge Venturini
- Paul Stanton as Mr. Morgan
- Harrison Greene as Tom Slade
- Harry C. Bradley as Herman Gideon
