= Wild Gold =

1934 film by George Marshall

- Directed by: George Marshall
- Screenplay by: Lester Cole; Henry Johnson
- Story by: Dudley Nichols; Lamar Trotti
- Produced by: Sol M. Wurtzel
- Starring: John Boles; Claire Trevor; Harry Green; Roger Imhof
- Cinematography: Joseph A. Valentine
- Edited by: Fred Allen
- Music by: David Buttolph
- Production company: Fox Film Corporation
- Distributed by: Fox Film Corporation
- Release date: June 8, 1934
- Running time: 75 minutes
- Country: United States
- Language: English

Wild Gold is a 1934 American romantic comedy drama film directed by George Marshall and starring John Boles, Claire Trevor, Harry Green and Roger Imhof. The film was released on June 8, 1934, by Fox Film Corporation.

== Plot ==
Steve Miller, a young mining engineer attracted to the nightclub singer Jerry Jordan, conspires to spend time with her when he tampers with her car leaving them both stranded in Nevada gold mining country. Miller ends up reopening a gold mine while Jordan performs at the nearby mining town alongside a travelling group of chorus girls led by impresario Jake Lorillard Pushkin.

== Cast ==
- John Boles as Steve Miller
- Claire Trevor as Jerry Jordan
- Harry Green as J. 'Jake' Lorillard Pushkin
- Roger Imhof as James 'Pop' Benson
- Ruth Gillette as Dixie Belle
- Monroe Owsley as Walter Jordan
- Edward Gargan as Eddie Sparks
- Suzanne Kaaren as One of the Golden Girls
- Wini Shaw as One of the Golden Girls
- Blanca Vischer as One of the Golden Girls
- Elsie Larson as One of the Golden Girls
- Gloria Roy as One of the Golden Girls
- Myrla Bratton as One of the Golden Girls

== Censorship ==
Before Wild Gold could be exhibited in Kansas, the Kansas Board of Review required the removal of a scene where the camera pans across a shelf of liquor bottles and to shorten the scene of men drinking.

== Bibliography ==
- Solomon, Aubrey. The Fox Film Corporation, 1915-1935: A History and Filmography. McFarland, 2011.
