= Love Time (film) =

1934 film directed by James Tinling

- Asther and Peterson
- Directed by: James Tinling
- Screenplay by: William Conselman; Henry Johnson; Paul Martin; Sally Sandlin; Lynn Starling
- Story by: Richard Carroll
- Produced by: John Stone
- Starring: Pat Paterson; Nils Asther; Herbert Mundin; Harry Green; Henry B. Walthall; Lucien Littlefield
- Cinematography: Arthur Miller
- Edited by: Alex Troffey
- Music by: Samuel Kaylin
- Production company: Fox Film Corporation
- Distributed by: Fox Film Corporation
- Release date: September 21, 1934
- Running time: 72 minutes
- Country: United States
- Language: English

Love Time is a 1934 American historical drama film directed by James Tinling and starring Pat Paterson, Nils Asther and Herbert Mundin. The film was released on September 21, 1934, by Fox Film Corporation. The film is a romanticized biopic of the nineteenth century Austrian composer Franz Schubert, released the same year as the similarly-themed British film Blossom Time.

== Cast ==
- Pat Paterson as Valerie
- Nils Asther as Franz Schubert
- Herbert Mundin as Caesar
- Harry Green as Adam
- Henry B. Walthall as Duke Johann von Hatzfeld
- Lucien Littlefield as Willie Obenbiegler
- Henry Kolker as Emperor Francis I
- Albert Conti as Nicholas
- Herman Bing as Istvan
- Roger Imhof as Innkeeper
- James Burke as Benjamin
- Josephine Whittell as Mrs. Obenbiegler
- Earle Foxe as Sergeant
- Georgia Caine as Countess Bertaud
- Mary Blackford as Charlotte Bertaud
- Paul England as Prince Frederick

== Bibliography ==
- Solomon, Aubrey. The Fox Film Corporation, 1915-1935: A History and Filmography (McFarland, 2011).
