= Shooting Straight =

1930 film

- Theatrical release poster
- Directed by: George Archainbaud
- Written by: Wallace Smith
- Screenplay by: J. Walter Ruben
- Story by: Barney A. Sarecky
- Produced by: Louis Sarecky
- Starring: Richard Dix; Mary Lawlor
- Cinematography: Edward Cronjager
- Edited by: Otto Ludwig
- Distributed by: RKO Radio Pictures
- Release date: July 20, 1930 (U.S.)
- Running time: 72 minutes
- Country: United States
- Language: English
- Budget: $238,000
- Box office: $418,000

Shooting Straight is a 1930 American pre-Code crime drama film, directed by George Archainbaud and starring the early RKO staple Richard Dix and Mary Lawlor. The screenplay was written by J. Walter Ruben, from Wallace Smith's adaptation of a story by Barney A. Sarecky (the producer's brother). It was one of the films that earned a positive return for RKO that year, turning a profit of $30,000.

== Plot ==
Larry Sheldon is a gambler, who learns that a friend of his has been murdered by a local gangster, Spot Willis. When he goes to confront Spot, a melee ensues in which Spot winds up dead. Thinking that he is responsible for the death, Sheldon flees the city aboard a train, with his companion, Chick. They share a Pullman compartment with an itinerant minister, Mr. Walters, whose wallet Chick unobtrusively removes from his pocket. When Sheldon discovers the theft, he chastises Chick and is determined to return the pilfered purse to its rightful owner. However, before he can, the train is involved in a serious accident, in which Sheldon is knocked unconscious.

When he awakes, Sheldon is in the home Reverend Powell, where he is recuperating. Due to his possession of Walters' wallet, the Reverend believes Sheldon to be the evangelist, a mistake which Sheldon does not correct, thinking that it will help him hide from the authorities. Sheldon, as time passes, begins to fall in love with the Reverend's daughter, Doris. He also begins to take the role of evangelistic minister seriously as well.

Things come to a head when the Reverend's son, Tommy, loses a significant amount of money to a local gambler, Martin. When Sheldon goes to Tommy's rescue, he is recognized by Martin, who calls in the police. In the events that follow, however, the truth is revealed that Sheldon did not actually kill Spots when another man confesses to the murder. Free from criminal charges, Sheldon and Doris begin a life together, with Sheldon continuing as an aspiring minister, but this time under his real name.

== Cast ==
- Richard Dix as Larry Sheldon
- Mary Lawlor as Doris Powell
- James Neill as Reverend Powell
- Mathew Betz as Martin
- George Cooper as Chick
- William Janney as Tommy Powell
- Robert E. O'Connor as Hagen
- Clarence Wurtz as Stevens
- Eddie Sturgis as Spike
- Richard Curtis as Butch

(cast list according to AFI database)

== Reception ==
While it was not a huge hit, the film was one of RKO's films that year that did show a small profit, netting $30,000.

== Notes ==
The story upon which this film was based was written by Barney Sarecky, the brother of the film's producer.

The film is known as A Colpo Sicuro in Italy.
