= Gladys Swarthout =

American opera singer and actress

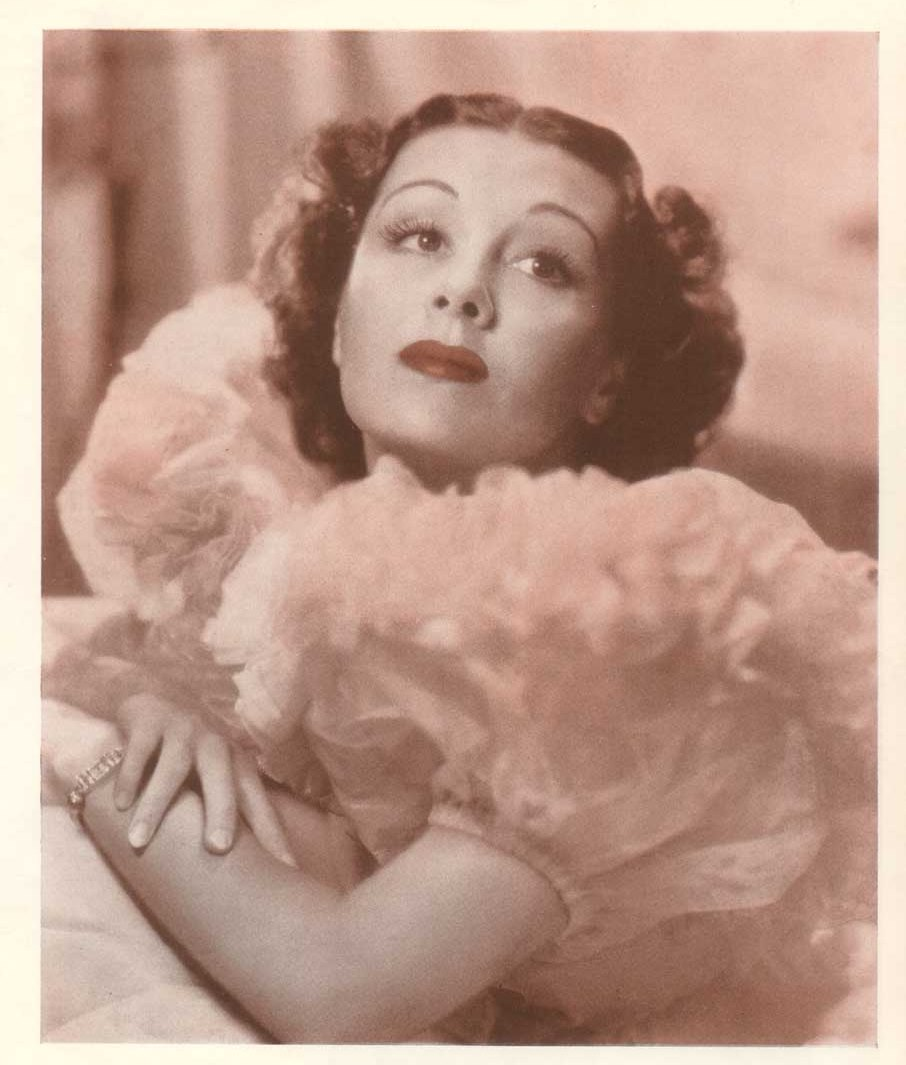
Gladys Swarthout, c. 1938

Gladys Swarthout (December 25, 1900, in Deepwater, Missouri – July 7, 1969, in Florence, Italy) was an American mezzo-soprano opera singer and actress.

== Career ==
While studying at the Bush Conservatory of Music in Chicago, a group of friends arranged an audition for her with the Chicago Civic Opera Company. Much to her surprise, she ended up with a contract, though at the time she did not know a single operatic role. When she debuted a few months later, she had memorized 23 parts and participated in over half of the season's operas.

She sang for the Ravinia Opera Company of Chicago for three seasons. She sang Carmen in April 1928 in Chicago with the American Opera Company, of which her future husband, Frank M. Chapman Jr., later became a member. In 1929, she made her debut with the New York Metropolitan Opera Company, where she sang in over 270 performances until a final Carmen in 1945. She appeared once more to sing one number at a gala concert in 1951. She attended the company's Gala Farewell on April 16, 1966 as a non-singing guest.

Swarthout's role as Carmen was well respected. She regularly worked eight hours a day with vocal coaches, and would spend an hour or more singing duets with her husband, Chapman. She also advocated inflating balloons and blowing bubbles to strengthen her lungs. She also wrote a semi-autobiographical novel entitled Come Soon, Tomorrow: The Story of a Young Singer, first published in 1943, which went through at least seven printings.

=== Films ===
She appeared in five films for Paramount Pictures, Rose of the Rancho (1936), Give Us This Night (1936), Champagne Waltz (1937), Romance in the Dark (1938), and Ambush (1939).

For the movie Champagne Waltz with Fred MacMurray, she sang her songs in five languages, including French, German, Italian, and Spanish for the foreign versions of the films. Swarthout also performed on many opera shows on television.

In one of her final public singing performances, she performed a concert in January 1951 at the Met. She continued to make public appearances, including an appearance on What's My Line? in 1951. The Railroad Hour presented Martha on February 22, 1954.

She was often heard on radio programs, including those of General Motors, RCA-Magic Key, Camel Caravan, the Ford Symphony, and the Prudential Family Hour. In a 1942 article, Time magazine reported that she had earned $1,250,000 in her lifetime. One of her signature songs on the radio was Bless This House featured in advertising and commonly found framed in many homes throughout America. Shortly after World War II, Swarthout recorded "Just Awearyin' for You" (w. 1894 by Frank Lebby Stanton, m. 1901 by Carrie Jacobs-Bond).

=== Concerts ===
In the 1930s/1940s, Swarthout regularly toured the country with Chapman and an accompanist through various concert initiatives, including the National Civic Concert Association and the National Concert Service.

She received an honorary Doctor of Music degree and is the only woman to have sung for the entire assembled Congress of the United States. She sang "America" for the Diplomatic Corps, Supreme Court, and the President on the occasion of the 150th Anniversary of the First Session of Congress. During World War II, Swarthout was a regular on Armed Forces Radio.

== Relationships ==
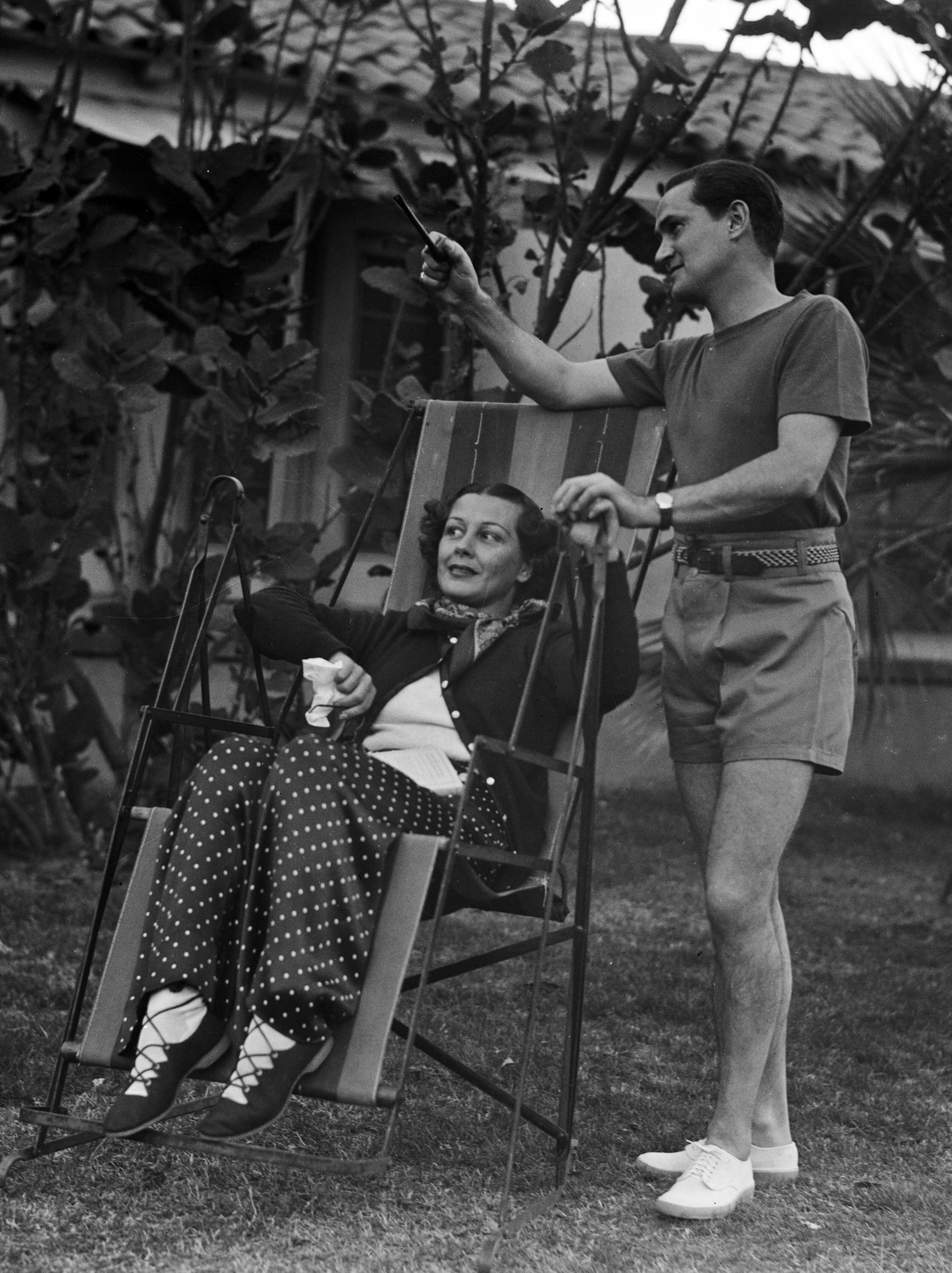
Swarthout and Chapman in 1935

Swarthout first married Harry Kern of Chicago, an older man who was general credit manager for the Hart-Schaffner Marx Company, but she still retained her maiden name for her singing appearances. Kern died in 1931.

She later married Frank M. Chapman, Jr. in 1931; the two had first met in an opera house in Naples two years earlier, introduced by Gladys' sister, Roma Swarthout. In addition to their common interest in singing, they enjoyed collecting French furniture, many examples of which can be seen in their photographs together. She once said, "Our marriage started as a romantic adventure. We intend to keep it that way." She collected silver and they had several dogs. It was also Chapman's second marriage.

== Later life ==
In 1956, Swarthout was diagnosed with a mitral heart valve problem. She eventually decided to undergo open heart surgery; she was on the operating table for six hours. Later, she began a campaign to ensure that parents knew the dangers of unsuspected rheumatic fever.

In 1958, Dr. Paul Dudley White presented her with the American Heart Association's very first "Heart-of-the-Year" Award, to be given annually to a distinguished American whose faith and courage in meeting the personal challenge of heart disease have inspired new hope for hearts. She wrote about her decision in When the Song Left My Heart, an article in the October 1958 Everywoman's Family Circle. As she went into retirement, she and Frank bought a villa in Italy, La Ragnaia, near Florence, where they lived together until Chapman's death in 1966.

== Death ==
She died on July 7, 1969, aged 68, in Florence, Italy from heart disease.

== Recordings ==
- Gladys Swarthout Sings Your Favorites, 1959, RCA
- Gladys Swarthout Musical Show Hits, RCA
- The Art Of Gladys Swarthout, 1970, RCA Victrola, Vic-1490
- My Song Goes On, 2006, Flare – SPEC 1027
- Gladys Swarthout, Empire Records
- Poem Of Love and The Sea, RCA Victor #LM-1793
- Songs of the Auvergne, RCA Victor WDM 1540
- Legendary Voices - Gladys Swarthout, 2003 Vergangenheit
- Gladys Swarthout Favorites from Musical Theatre

== Writings ==
- Come Soon, Tomorrow: The Story of a Young Singer (novel), New York, 1943 Dodd Mead
