= Pat Paterson =

British actress (1910–1978)

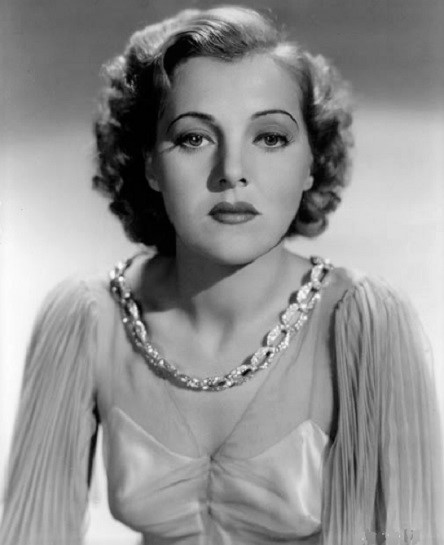
- Paterson in 1935
- Born: Eliza Paterson; 10 April 1910; Bradford, West Riding of Yorkshire, England
- Died: 24 August 1978 (aged 68); Phoenix, Arizona, U.S.
- Burial place: Holy Cross Cemetery, Culver City, California, U.S.
- Other name: Patricia Elizabeth Paterson
- Education: Newby Primary School
- Occupation: Actress
- Years active: 1931–1939
- Spouse: Charles Boyer (m. 1934)
- Children: 1

Patricia Elizabeth Paterson (born Eliza Paterson; 10 April 1910 – 24 August 1978) was an English-American film actress. Although she made more than 20 films, she is best known as the wife of actor Charles Boyer.

== Childhood and early life ==
Paterson was born on 10 April 1910 at No.74 Fitzgerald Street, Horton, a suburb of Bradford, West Riding of Yorkshire. Her mother, Hannah Holroyd (b. 4 February 1888, Bradford) was English, her father, John Robb Paterson (b. 1888, Kirkcaldy, Fife, Scotland) was a Scot. Eliza was the second of three children. She attended Newby Primary School in West Bowling, Bradford as a child.

== Early Hollywood career ==
In 1928, although aged only 18 (the legal age of adulthood in the UK at that time was 21) she persuaded her parents to allow her to leave for Hollywood. She arrived in 1929 and was signed by Fox Studios as a contract player and immediately began to obtain film roles. She was renamed Patricia (almost immediately shortened to Pat) Paterson, as the Pat-Paterson sound had an ear-catching alliterative rhythm. From 1930 to 1934 she appeared in many studio pictures, in roles of increasing prominence. In the 1935 20th Century Fox film Charlie Chan Goes To Egypt, starring Warner Oland as Chan, she played the female lead, Carol Arnold. This was intended by the studio to serve as her break-out role for leading parts. In early 1934, as production on Charlie Chan Goes To Egypt was wrapping, Maurice Chevalier persuaded his lifelong best friend, fellow French actor Charles Boyer, to attend a Fox Studios post-New Year dinner party at which Pat Paterson was a guest. In interviews over the years, Boyer declared their meeting to have been a case of love at first sight. They married within four weeks of the party, on St. Valentine's Day, 14 February 1934, in Yuma, Arizona.

== Later Hollywood career ==
Boyer was inaccurately quoted as saying he thought his wife shouldn't work, which is why she gave up her career. In truth, he said nothing of the kind, and he helped Pat's career where he could. Well into their marriage, Paterson continued to work. Indeed, arguably her greatest commercial successes came in the five years immediately following her marriage to Boyer. She continued to appear in at least one film per year until the outbreak of World War II in 1939, when she and her husband, Charles Boyer, as Europeans, devoted themselves to supporting the war effort of Britain and France. It was the war which effectively brought an end to her film career. On 9 December 1943, one year after her husband became an American citizen, she gave birth to their only child, Michael Charles Boyer, in Los Angeles. Paterson became a United States citizen in 1947.

== Son's death ==
According to Associated Press reports, after midnight on 23 September 1965, Michael Charles Boyer, 21 years old, died of a single gunshot to his right temple at his Coldwater Canyon home.

Two witnesses, a house guest and his girlfriend were present in the home. His girlfriend had just told him that she did not want to see him any more. Michael replied that he could not live without her and called himself a "loser". He then went into the den and a single gunshot was heard. Subsequent news reports said that earlier, Michael had shot out a window in his home while playing Russian roulette, thus raising the possibility that his death was an accident. At the time, Charles Boyer was filming in Paris and returned to Los Angeles after he phoned his wife and was told of the incident.

== Death ==
Diagnosed with cancer, Paterson died in Phoenix, Arizona on 24 August 1978. Charles Boyer died by suicide two days later, by drug overdose.

== Filmography ==
Year	Title	Role	Notes
1931	The Professional Guest	Marjorie Phibsby	Short
1931	The Other Woman	Prudence Wycherly	
1931	The Great Gay Road	Nancy	
1932	Lord Babs	Helen Parker	
1932	Partners Please	Angela Grittlewood	
1932	Here's George	Laura Wentworth	
1933	Bitter Sweet	Dolly	
1933	Head of the Family	Geraldine Powis-Porter	
1933	The Right to Live	June Kessler	
1933	The Medicine Man	Gwendoline Wells	
1933	The Love Wager	Peggy	
1933	The Laughter of Fools	Doris Gregg	
1933	Beware of Women	Margery	Short
1934	Bottoms Up	Wanda Gale	
1934	Call It Luck	Pat Laurie	
1934	Love Time	Valerie	
1935	Lottery Lover	Patty	
1935	Charlie Chan in Egypt	Carol Arnold	
1936	Spendthrift	Valerie 'Boots' O'Connell	
1937	52nd Street	Margaret Rondell	
1938	Hollywood Goes to Town	Herself	Short documentary
1939	Idiot's Delight	Mrs. Cherry	(final film role)

== Sources ==
- Frank Arnau (1932). Universal Filmlexikon 1932. Berlin/London: Universal Filmlexikon GmbH/London General Press.
