= 52nd Street (film) =

1937 film

- Directed by: Harold Young
- Written by: Grover Jones; Sid Silvers
- Produced by: Walter Wanger
- Starring: Ian Hunter; Leo Carrillo; Pat Paterson; Ella Logan
- Cinematography: George Schneiderman
- Edited by: William H. Reynolds
- Music by: Alfred Newman
- Production company: Walter Wanger Productions
- Distributed by: United Artists
- Release date: November 19, 1937
- Running time: 80 minutes
- Country: United States
- Language: English
- Budget: $523,869
- Box office: $598,384

52nd Street is a 1937 American drama film directed by Harold Young and starring Ian Hunter. Leo Carrillo and Pat Paterson. An independent production by Walter Wanger it was distributed by United Artists. It portrays the rise of 52nd Street in Manhattan as a major hub of nightclubs in the 1930s.

== Cast ==
- Ian Hunter as Rufus Rondell
- Leo Carrillo as Fiorello Zamarelli
- Pat Paterson as Margaret Rondell
- Ella Logan as Betty
- Zasu Pitts as Letitia Rondell
- Marla Shelton as Evelyn Macy Rondell
- Collette Lyons as Minnie
- Dorothy Peterson as Adela Rondell
- Kenny Baker as 'Benny' Zamarelli
- Al Shean as Klauber
- Sid Silvers as Sid
- Jack White as Jack
- Jack Adair as Porky
- George Tapps as George Tapps
- Jerry Colonna as Specialty Vocalist
- Roman Bohnen as James
- Wade Boteler as Butler
- Pat Harrington Sr. as Pat Harrington
- Al Norman as Al Norman
- Maurice Rocco as Maurice Rocco
- Dotty Saulter as Dorothy
- Delmar Watson as Young Benjamin
- Frank Mills as Party Guest
- Edmund Mortimer as Nightclub Patron
- Cyril Ring as Nightclub Patron
- Mary MacLaren as Nightclub Patron
- Jim Thorpe as Street Thug
- Frank O'Connor as Policeman

== Reception ==
The film recorded a loss of $4,392.

== Bibliography ==
- Stumpf, Charles. ZaSu Pitts: The Life and Career. McFarland, 2010.
