= Romance in the Dark =

1938 film by H. C. Potter

- Directed by: H. C. Potter
- Based on: The Yellow Nightingale by Hermann Bahr
- Produced by: Harlan Thompson; William LeBaron
- Starring: Gladys Swarthout; John Boles; John Barrymore; Claire Dodd
- Cinematography: William C. Mellor
- Edited by: Archie Marshek; James Smith
- Music by: John Leipold
- Production company: Paramount Pictures
- Distributed by: Paramount Pictures
- Release date: 1938
- Running time: 77 minutes
- Country: United States
- Language: English

Romance in the Dark is a 1938 American comedy musical film directed by H. C. Potter and starring Gladys Swarthout, John Boles, John Barrymore, and Claire Dodd. It is one of five films produced by Paramount in the 1930s featuring Gladys Swarthout, a very popular Metropolitan Opera mezzo-soprano. The studio was attempting to build on the popularity of Grace Moore, another opera singer, who had also expanded her talents into films. It is based upon the play The Yellow Nightingale by Hermann Bahr.

== Cast ==
- Gladys Swarthout as Ilona Boros
- John Boles as Antal Kovach
- John Barrymore as Zoltan Jason
- Claire Dodd as Countess Monica Foldesay
- Fritz Feld as Fritz
- Curt Bois as Von Hemisch
- Carlos De Valdez as Ballot
- Torben Meyer as Prof. Jacobsen
- Marguerite Franz as Kovach's Maid
- Fortunio Bonanova as Tenor
- Esther Muir as Prima Donna
- Eddy Conrad as Barber
- Maxine Armour as Dancer
- Max Barwyn as Ticket Seller
- Jeanette Bates as Dancer
- Brooks Benedict as Opera Patron
- Marie Burton as Girl
- Janet Elsie Clark as Girl Singer
- Nick Copeland as Stagehand
- Sidney D'Albrook as Newsboy
- Sheila Darcy as Girl
- Dorothy Dayton as Girl
- Charles De Ravenne as Newsboy
- Ray De Ravenne as Newsboy
- Paula DeCardo as Girl
- Helen Dickson as Patron at Theatre
- Yvonne Duval as Girl
- Jeanne Francis as Dancer
- Otto Fries as Policeman
- Norah Gale as Maid
- Ferdinand Gottschalk as Pianist
- Elizabeth Hacker as Ballet Dancer
- Beth Hartman as Maid
- George Hickman as Page Boy
- Otto Hoffman as Stage Doorman
- Flower Hugiz as Girl
- Alfred Hummel as Newsboy
- Nita James as Girl
- Lola Jensen as Girl
- Jacqueline Kopp as Girl
- Harry Lamont as Tough Man in Audience
- George Magrill as Tough Man in Audience
- Mary Manners as Woman
- Marian March as Girl
- Carole Mathews as Dancer
- Frank Mills as Tough Man in Audience
- Helaine Moler as Maid
- Florence Nelson as Dancer
- Carol Parker as Maid
- Joe Ploski as Newsboy
- Russ Powell as Stagehand
- Suzanne Ridgway as Girl
- Alma Ross as Maid
- Bela Schaffer as
- Alexander Schoenberg as Doorman
- Ferdinand Schumann-Heink
- Wanda Stevenson as Dancer
- Loie Tilton Gaither as Girl
- Jacques Vanaire as Patron at Theatre
- Lois Verner as Fat Girl Singer, None But the Lonely Heart
- Gloria Williams as Girl
- Florence Wix as Woman With Balint

== See also ==
- Rose of the Rancho (1936)
- Give Us This Night (1936)
- Champagne Waltz (1937)
- Ambush (1939)
