= Give Us This Night =

1936 film by Alexander Hall

- Directed by: Alexander Hall
- Written by: Edwin Justus Mayer
- Starring: Gladys Swarthout; Jan Kiepura
- Music by: Erich Wolfgang Korngold
- Distributed by: Paramount Pictures
- Release date: March 6, 1936
- Running time: 73 minutes
- Country: United States
- Language: English

Give Us This Night is one of five movies produced by Paramount Pictures featuring Gladys Swarthout, a very popular Metropolitan Opera mezzo-soprano. The studio was attempting to build on the popularity of Grace Moore, another opera singer, who had also expanded her talents into movies.

== Plot ==
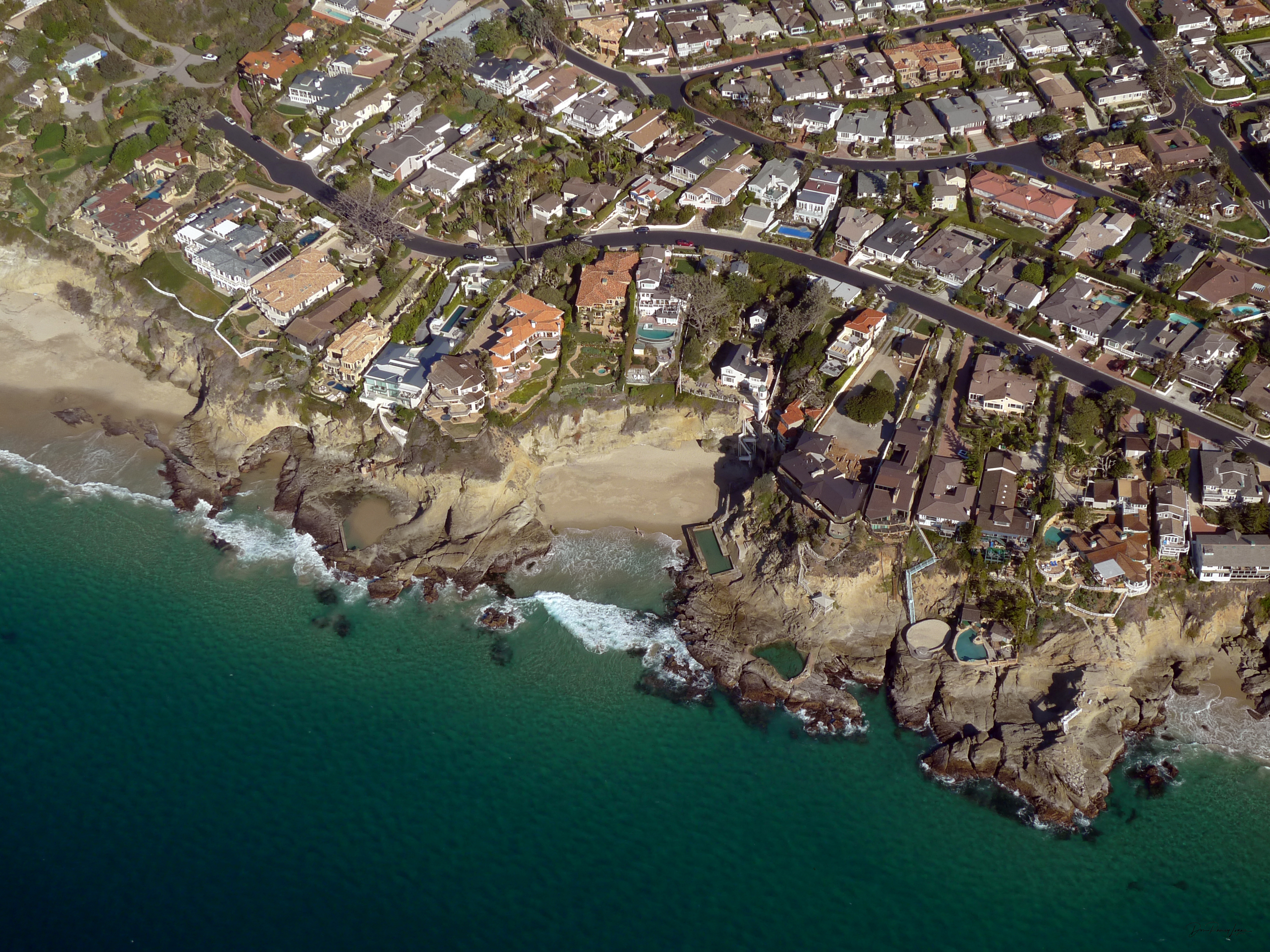
Three Arch Bay in January 2015

After being introduced to the world of opera, a fisherman (Jan Kiepura) falls for a woman (Swarthout) whose guardian is a noted composer (Philip Merivale). They met when the fisherman evaded the police by seeking refuge in the village church. While there, they are each captivated by hearing the other singing Mass. The beautiful woman falls in love with the fisherman with the wonderful voice.

== Production background ==
Scenes from the film were shot at Three Arch Bay near South Laguna, California.

== See also ==
- Rose of the Rancho (1936)
- Champagne Waltz (1937)
- Romance in the Dark (1938)
- Ambush (1939)
