= Beware of Women =

1933 film by George King

- Directed by: George King
- Produced by: Irving Asher
- Starring: Jack Hobbs; Pat Paterson; Anthony Hankey
- Production company: Warner Brothers
- Distributed by: Warner Brothers
- Release date: May 1933
- Running time: 51 minutes
- Country: United Kingdom
- Language: English

Beware of Women is a 1933 British comedy film directed by George King and starring Jack Hobbs, Pat Paterson and Anthony Hankey. It was made at Teddington Studios as a quota quickie by Warner Brothers.

== Preservation status ==
The British Film Institute National Archive holds no stills or ephemera, and no film or video materials.

== Plot ==
Andrew's fascination with women lands him in trouble with the police, and his aristocratic family decide that relocating him to Kenya might calm him down. He meets Margery, but her stern guardian, Lady Augusta, disallows any romance. He sets off for Africa, with Margery planning to join him.

== Cast ==
- Jack Hobbs as Andrew
- Pat Paterson as Margery
- Anthony Hankey as Tony
- Clifford Heatherley as Lord Edeley
- Helen Ferrers as Lady Edeley

== Reception ==
Kine Weekly wrote: "Supporting offering of a light and harmless nature for popular programmes. ... Jack Hobbs as Andrew capably portrays the carefree young man about town, and Pat Paterson makes a charming heroine. ... Competent direction gets good comedy incident from the slight story, and although the action is somewhat slow it develops to a moderately entertaining climax."
