= Mary Lawlor (actress) =

American actress (1907–1977)

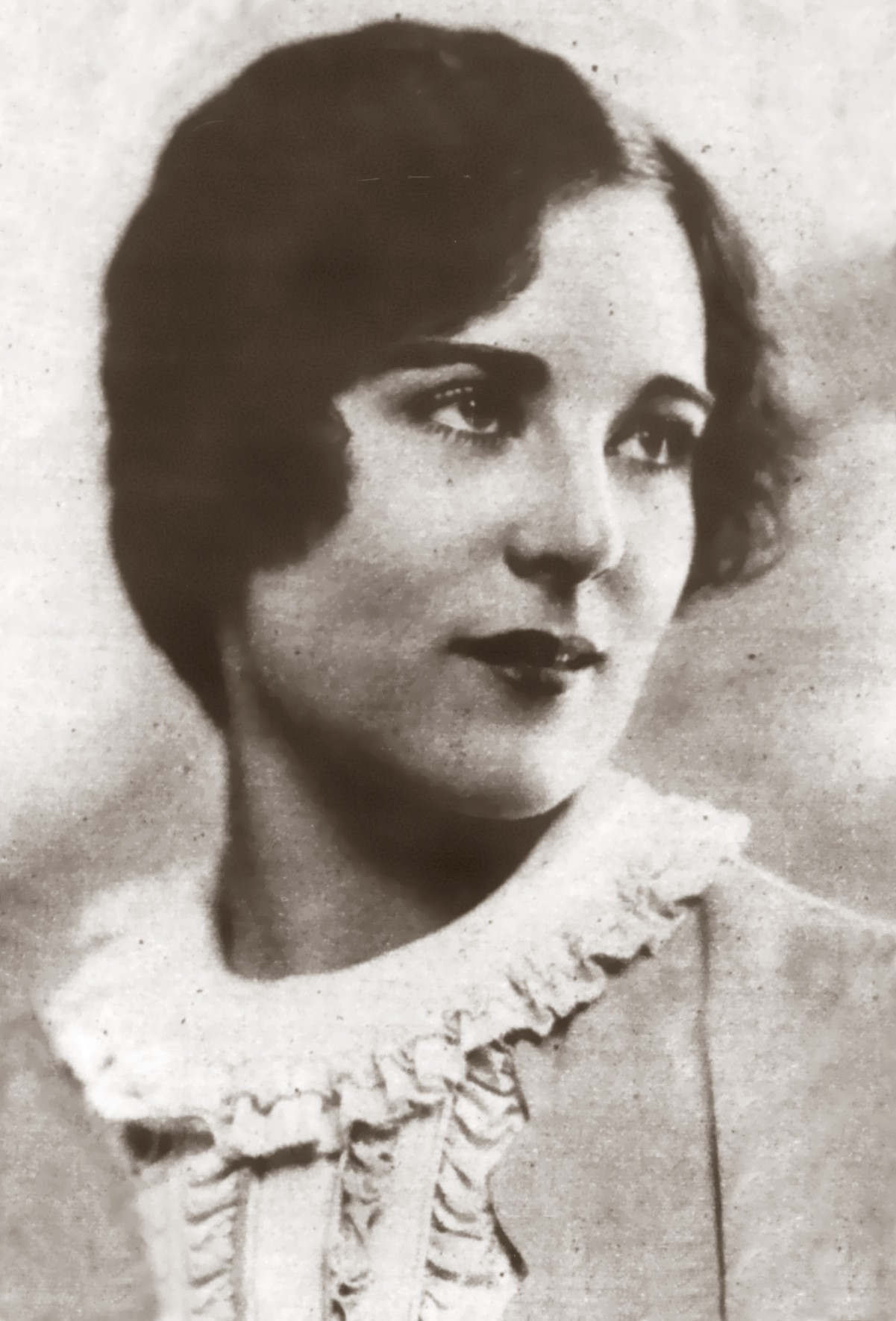
- Lawlor at Chanin's 46th Street Theatre, c. 1927
- Born: June 28, 1907; Utica, New York, U.S.
- Died: April 20, 1977 (aged 69); Downey, California, U.S.
- Occupation: Actress
- Years active: 1927–1930
- Spouse: Lyn Lary (m. 1931; died 1973)
- Children: 1

Mary Lawlor (June 28, 1907 – April 20, 1977) was an American stage and screen actress.

== Biography ==
Lawlor was born in Utica, New York.

Lawlor was a lead actress in several productions including Good News (musical) and the 1930 film adaptation. She starred in the musical as a tutor and love interest. The show had a very successful run on Broadway.

She performed The Best Things in Life Are Free, Lucky in Love and Varsity Drag with John Price Jones. The musical inspired a slew of copycat college themed stories.

She also appeared in the Harold Arlen musical You Said It, and the musical No, No, Nanette.

She married baseball player Lyn Lary on July 14, 1931. They had a son, Lynford Lawlor Lary.

== Filmography ==
- Shooting Straight
- Good News
