= Sid Silvers =

American actor (1901–1976)

Sid Silvers (January 16, 1901 in Brooklyn, New York – August 20, 1976 in Brooklyn) was an American actor, comedian, lyricist, and writer.

Silvers began his career in vaudeville in the early 1920s as a comedy partner of Phil Baker. As part of their act, Silvers would heckle Baker from the audience. The Baker/Silvers act was later used as the basis for the 1951 Martin and Lewis film The Stooge. The duo continued to perform together up through 1928.

In 1925 Silvers made his Broadway debut in the revue Artists and Models. He also appeared in the revue A Night in Spain in 1927 and contributed lyrics to the musicals The Song Writer (1928) and Pleasure Bound (1929). He wrote the book for the 1931 musical You Said It. He returned to the Broadway stage in 1932 to portray Louie Webb in the musical Take a Chance. He later wrote the music and lyrics to the review New Faces of 1936.

Silvers made his film debut in the 1929 feature The Show of Shows and then went on to play supporting roles in such films as Dancing Sweeties (1930), Bottoms Up (1934), Transatlantic Merry-Go-Round (1934), Born to Dance (1936), and Broadway Melody of 1936, notably also serving as a scriptwriter on the latter two films. He often contributed special comedy material to some of the larger MGM productions, including The Wizard of Oz in 1939.

In the 1940s Silvers was mainly active as a performer on the stage and on radio. He made his final film appearance in 1946, playing a featured comic role in Mr. Ace. In the 1950s, he was a writer for The Mickey Rooney Show.

== Filmography ==
Year	Title	Role	Notes
1929	The Show of Shows	Al Jolson Impersonator / Introducing Larry Ceballos Black and White Girls Number	
1930	Dancing Sweeties	Jerry Browne	
1930	Follow the Leader	Minor Role	Uncredited
1933	My Weakness	Maxie	
1934	Bottoms Up	Spud Mosco aka Reginald Morris	
1934	Transatlantic Merry-Go-Round	Shorty	
1935	Broadway Melody of 1936	Snoop	
1935	Rendezvous	Recruiter	Uncredited
1936	Born to Dance	'Gunny' Saks	
1937	52nd Street	Sid	
1946	Mr. Ace	Pencil	final film role
