= Herbert Mundin =

British actor (1898–1939)

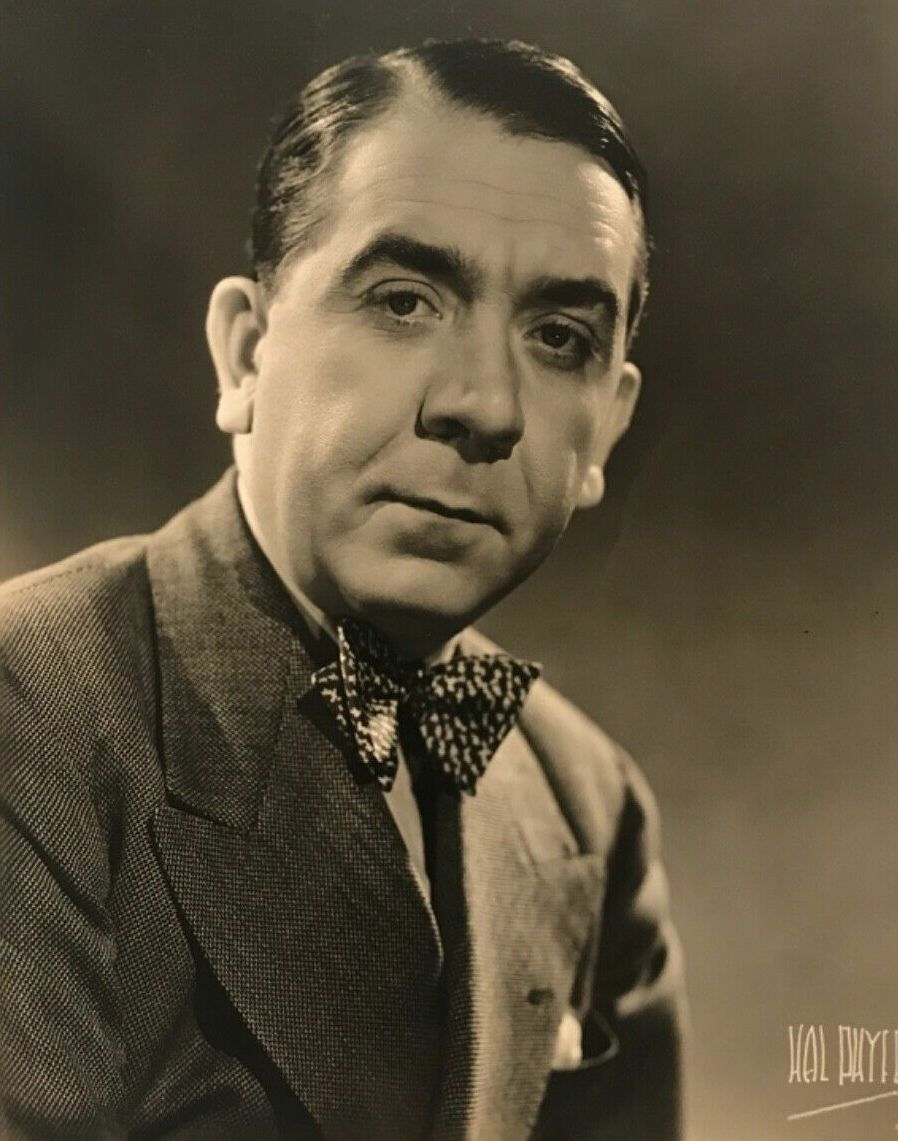
- Mundin in the 1930s
- Born: Herbert Thomas Mundin; 21 August 1898; St Helens, England
- Died: 5 March 1939 (aged 40); Van Nuys, California, U.S.
- Years active: 1930–1939
- Spouse(s): Hilda Frances Hoyes (1921–?); Kathleen Ann Reed (1925–1934)

Herbert Thomas Mundin (21 August 1898 – 5 March 1939) was an English character actor. He was frequently typecast in 1930s Hollywood films like The Adventures of Robin Hood as an older cheeky eccentric, a type helped by his jowled features and cheerful disposition.

== Early life ==
Mundin was born in St Helens, then in Lancashire (now part of Merseyside). His father was a nomadic, Primitive Methodist home missionary. His family moved within a short time of his birth to St Albans in Hertfordshire (the 1901 census data reveal that the family lived at St Helens Villa, Paxton Road, St Albans; his parents William and Jane apparently naming their house after the town where they first met and where Herbert was born). Mundin was educated at St Albans School. During World War I he served with the Royal Navy.

== Career ==
He began his acting career on the London stage during the 1920s. Mundin first travelled to America on 18 December 1923 for a series of theatrical engagements in New York. He sailed from Southampton on the RMS Aquitania and described himself in ship’s passenger manifest as 5'7" tall with a fair complexion, brown hair, blue eyes and a scar over his left eye. His big break as an actor was arguably with Gertrude Lawrence and Beatrice Lillie in Charlot's Revue when it appeared on Broadway in 1925.

In 1931, after working in Australia and London, he permanently moved to the United States, where he received a contract with the Fox Film Corporation, where he had a successful career as a character actor in over fifty films. Perhaps his most celebrated role was as Much, the miller's son in The Adventures of Robin Hood (1938) alongside Errol Flynn. Other film appearances included Mutiny on the Bounty (1935) with Charles Laughton and Clark Gable, and MGM's David Copperfield (1935) as Barkis.

== Death ==
Mundin was killed in an auto crash on March 5, 1939. He was a passenger in a car which was hit in an intersection, and died of a fractured skull.

== Filmography ==
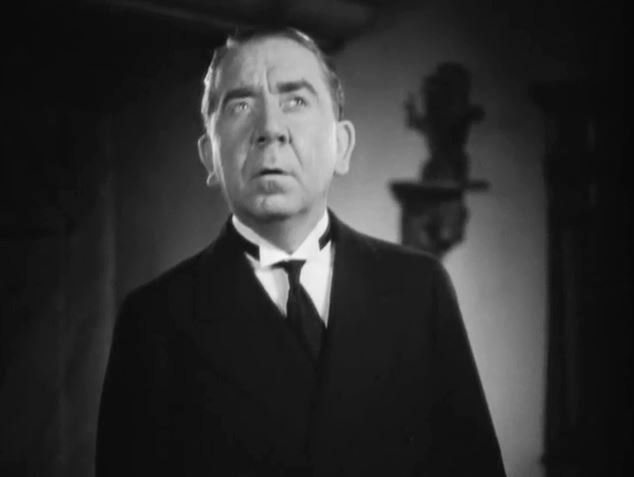
Herbert Mundin in Charlie Chan's Secret

=== Film ===
| Year | Title | Role | Notes |
|---|---|---|---|
| 1931 | East Lynne on the Western Front | Bob Cox / Lady Isobel | |
| 1932 | The Silent Witness | Henry Hammer | |
| 1932 | Devil's Lottery | Trowbridge | |
| 1932 | The Trial of Vivienne Ware | William Boggs | |
| 1932 | Bachelor's Affairs | Jepson | |
| 1932 | Almost Married | Jenkins, the butler | Uncredited |
| 1932 | Chandu the Magician | Albert Miggles | |
| 1932 | Love Me Tonight | Groom | Uncredited |
| 1932 | The Painted Woman | Georgie, mess boy | Uncredited |
| 1932 | Life Begins | Mr. MacGilvairy | Uncredited |
| 1932 | One Way Passage | S.S. Maloa steward | Uncredited |
| 1932 | Sherlock Holmes | George | |
| 1933 | Cavalcade | Alfred Bridges | |
| 1933 | Dangerously Yours | Grove | |
| 1933 | Pleasure Cruise | Henry | |
| 1933 | Adorable | Pipac, the detective | |
| 1933 | It's Great to Be Alive | Brooks | |
| 1933 | The Devil's in Love | Bimby | |
| 1933 | Arizona to Broadway | Kingfish Miller | |
| 1933 | Shanghai Madness | Larsen | |
| 1933 | Hoop-La | Hap Spissel | |
| 1934 | Orient Express | Herbert Thomas Peters | |
| 1934 | Ever Since Eve | Horace Saunders | |
| 1934 | Bottoms Up | Limey Brook / Lord Brocklehurst | |
| 1934 | All Men Are Enemies | Noggins | |
| 1934 | Orient Express | Horatio Hollingsworth Wilson | |
| 1934 | Call It Luck | Herbert Biggelwade | |
| 1934 | Springtime for Henry | Trivers | |
| 1934 | Love Time | Caesar | |
| 1934 | Hell in the Heavens | Granny Biggs | |
| 1935 | David Copperfield | Barkis | |
| 1935 | Black Sheep | Oscar | |
| 1935 | Spring Tonic | Thompson, the butler | |
| 1935 | Ladies Love Danger | Giffins | |
| 1935 | Mutiny on the Bounty | Smith | |
| 1935 | The Imperfect Lady | Frederick Hitch | |
| 1935 | The Widow from Monte Carlo | John Torrent | |
| 1936 | King of Burlesque | English Impresario | |
| 1936 | Charlie Chan's Secret | Baxter, the butler | |
| 1936 | A Message to Garcia | Henry Piper | |
| 1936 | Under Two Flags | Rake | |
| 1936 | Champagne Charlie | Mr. Fipps | |
| 1936 | Tarzan Escapes | Herbert Henry Rawlins | |
| 1937 | Another Dawn | Wilkins | |
| 1937 | You Can't Beat Love | Jasper 'Meadows' Hives | |
| 1937 | Angel | Mr Greenwood | |
| 1937 | That's My Story | Hiram | |
| 1938 | Invisible Enemy | Sergeant Alfred M. Higgs | |
| 1938 | The Adventures of Robin Hood | Much | |
| 1938 | Lord Jeff | Bosun 'Crusty' Jelks | |
| 1938 | Exposed | Skippy | |
| 1939 | Society Lawyer | Layton | (final film role) |

== Theatre ==
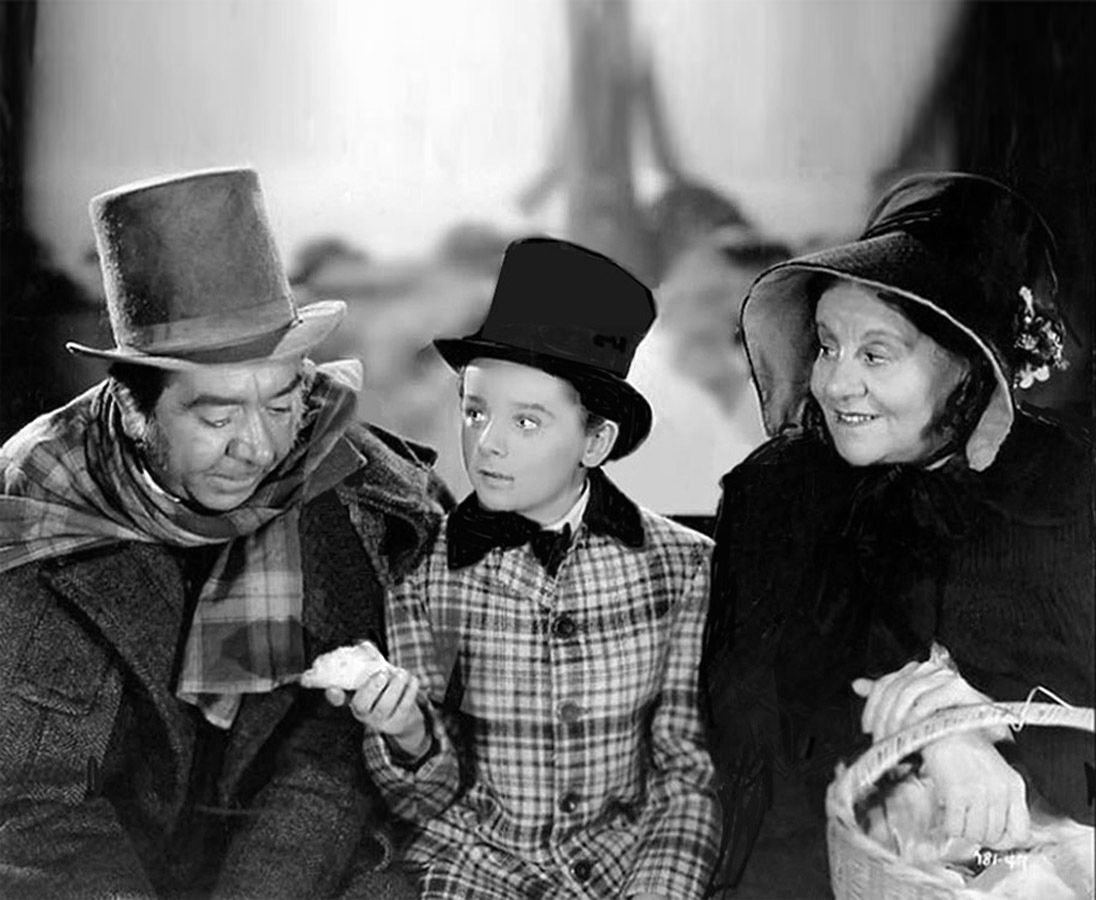
Herbert Mundin, Freddie Bartholomew and Jessie Ralph in MGM's David Copperfield (1935)

| Year | Title | Theatre | Notes |
|---|---|---|---|
| 1921-1922 | A to Z | Prince of Wales's Theatre | His London debut |
| 1921-1922 | Pot Luck | Vaudeville Theatre, London | |
| 1922-1923 | Snap | Vaudeville Theatre, London | |
| 1923 | Rats | Vaudeville Theatre, London | |
| 1923 | Yes! | Vaudeville Theatre, London | |
| 1925 | Charlot's Revue | Prince of Wales Theatre | |

== Bibliography ==
- Wearing, J. P. (2014). The London Stage 1920-1929: A Calendar of Productions, Performers and Personnel. Rowman and Littlefield
- Hischak, Thomas S. (2009). Broadway Plays and Musicals: Descriptions and Essential Facts of More Than 14,000 Shows through 2007. McFarland
