= Champagne Waltz =

1937 film by A. Edward Sutherland

- Directed by: A. Edward Sutherland
- Written by: Don Hartman; Frank Butler; Billy Wilder; Hy Kraft
- Produced by: Harlan Thompson; William LeBaron
- Starring: Gladys Swarthout; Fred MacMurray; Jack Oakie; Fritz Leiber
- Cinematography: William C. Mellor
- Edited by: Paul Weatherwax
- Music by: Multiple contributors including a lyric by Oscar Hammerstein
- Production company: Paramount Pictures
- Distributed by: Paramount Pictures
- Release date: February 5, 1937
- Running time: 87 minutes
- Country: United States
- Language: English

Champagne Waltz is a 1937 American comedy film directed by A. Edward Sutherland and starring Gladys Swarthout, Fred MacMurray and Jack Oakie. The theme of the film was inspired by the eponymous hit song, written in 1934, by the compositional pair Con Conrad and Ben Oakland. It is one of five movies produced by Paramount in the 1930s featuring Swarthout, a very popular Metropolitan Opera mezzo-soprano. The studio was attempting to build on the popularity of Grace Moore, another opera singer, who had also expanded her talents into movies. The film's sets were designed by the art director Ernst Fegté working with Hans Dreier. The costume designer was Travis Banton.

== Plot ==
This is a light musical with elements of screwball comedy. It documents the rivalry between a Vienna Waltz studio and the American jazz band that moves in next door. Franz Strauss is stressed because his waltz palace is losing business to the jazz club where Fred MacMurray's band is performing. He pretends to be the US Consul when he encounters Swarthout, the daughter of the waltz studio owner. He changes the story to be an icebox salesman in order to continue wooing Swarthout. Meanwhile, Oakie is falling for a countess who sold him a fake silver service.

== Cast ==
- Gladys Swarthout as Elsa Strauss
- Fred MacMurray as Buzzy Bellew
- Jack Oakie as Happy Gallagher
- Frank Veloz as Larry
- Yolanda Casazza as Anna
- Herman Bing as Max Snellinek
- Fritz Leiber as Franz Strauss
- Vivienne Osborne as Countess Mariska
- Frank Forest as Karl Lieberlich
- Ernest Cossart as Waiter
- Benny Baker as Flip
- James Burke as Mr. Scribner
- Maude Eburne as Mrs. Scribner
- Maurice Cass as Hugo
- Guy Bates Post as Lumvedder
- Michael Visaroff as Ivanovitch
- Rudolph Anders as Emperor Franz Joseph
- Stanley Price as Johann Strauss
- Tommy Bond as Otto, Singing Student
- Carol Adams as Dancer

== Songs ==
- "The Blue Danube Waltz", music by Johann Strauss, lyrics by Leo Robin
- "The Champagne Waltz", music by Con Conrad and Ben Oakland, lyrics by Milton Drake
- "Could I Be In Love?", music by William Daly, lyrics by Leo Robin
- "I'll Take Romance", music by Ben Oakland, lyrics by Oscar Hammerstein II
- "The Merry-Go-Round", by Ann Ronell
- "Paradise In Waltz Time", music by Friedrich Hollaender (as Frederick Hollander), lyrics by Sam Coslow
- "When Is A Kiss Not A Kiss", music by Burton Lane, lyrics by Ralph Freed

== Critical reception ==
Time gave the movie a poor review as a "heavy-handed musical naively designed to combine the best features of jazz with those of the Viennese waltz."

In their March, 1937 edition, Modern Screen gave the film a one-star review, and wrote, "Champagne Waltz is a disappointment. With a cast headed by Gladys Swarthout, Fred MacMurray, and Jack Oakie one expects a gay and charming piece full of laughs and good music. The result, instead is a rather dull, old-fashioned operetta which never lives up to the promise of its title."

Variety offered a more positive assessment and stated that it was the best of the three films Gladys Swarthout had so far made for Paramount but, despite high production values, was still considered to be a "box office middleweight." Aided by the "driving power" of Fred MacMurray’s presence, "the mark of the prima donna is less apparent this time and she becomes a more appealing personality."

== See also ==
- Rose of the Rancho (1936)
- Give Us This Night (1936)
- Romance in the Dark (1938)
- Ambush (1939)
