= Three Arch Bay =

Unincorporated community in California

Coordinates: 33.4909°N 117.7323°W

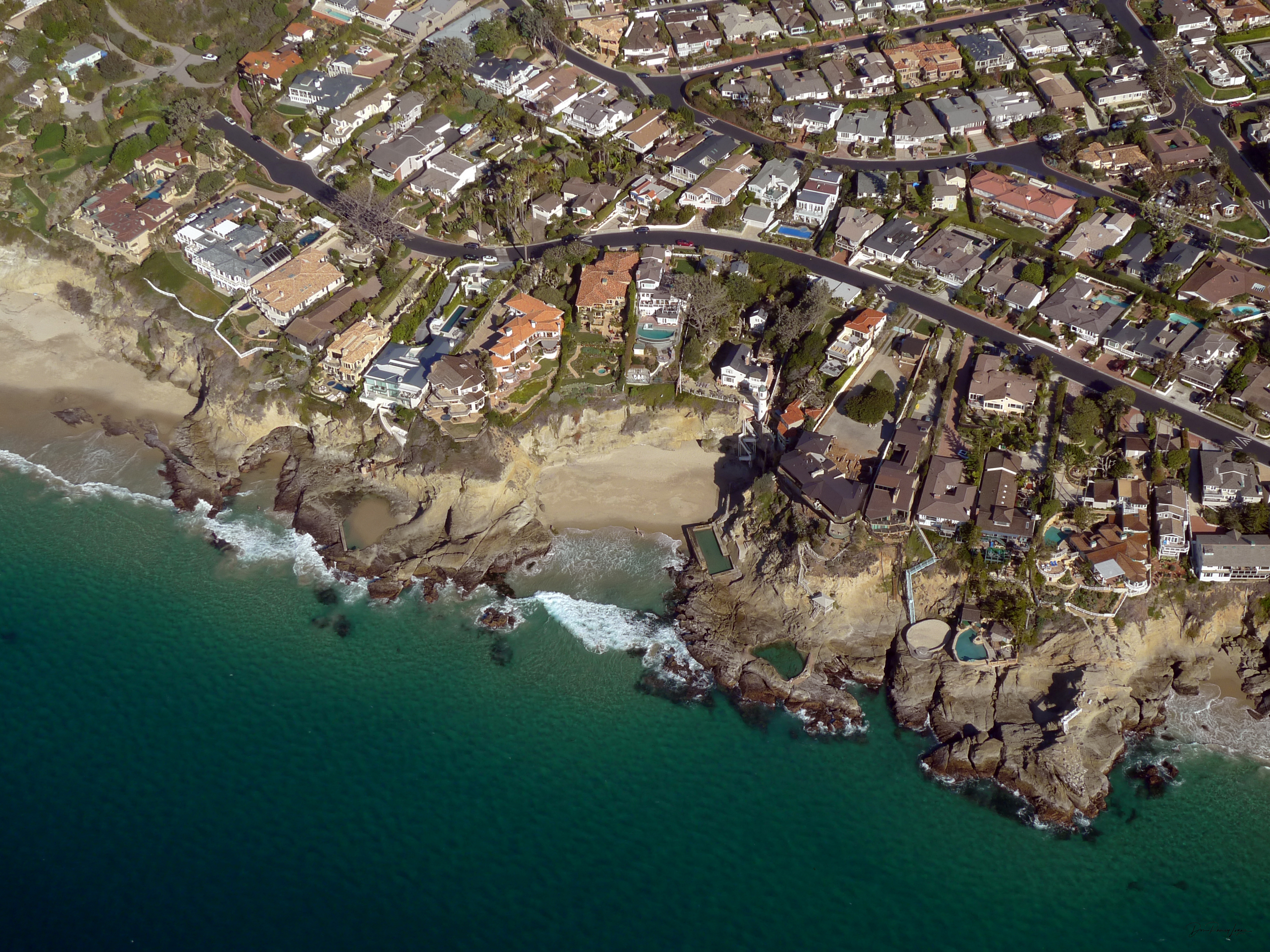
Aerial overview of homes in Three Arch Bay community

Three Arch Bay is a 29-acre (12 ha) private gated community located in the South Laguna neighborhood of Laguna Beach, California. It is named for a formation of three natural arches in the rocky cliffs along the ocean. The community features some oceanfront homes with swimming pools built into the intertidal rocks which are replenished by the incoming tides.

== History ==
According to a letter of Dana Point developer Sidney Woodruff, the entire 29 acres (12 ha) site was purchased in 1926 for $135,000.

The first rock pool was created in 1929 by film producer Edward H. Griffith. Griffith built his property, which included a lighthouse, for use as a backdrop in feature films. Early movies filmed in Three Arch Bay included Warner Bros.' Captain Blood (1935) starring Errol Flynn and Olivia de Havilland, and Paramount Pictures' Give Us This Night (1936).

By 1939 lots in the area were sold for $100 down on a $3,000 lot. The original sales promotional advertisements warned of "Rattlesnakes Galore."
