= Transatlantic Merry-Go-Round =

1934 American drama film

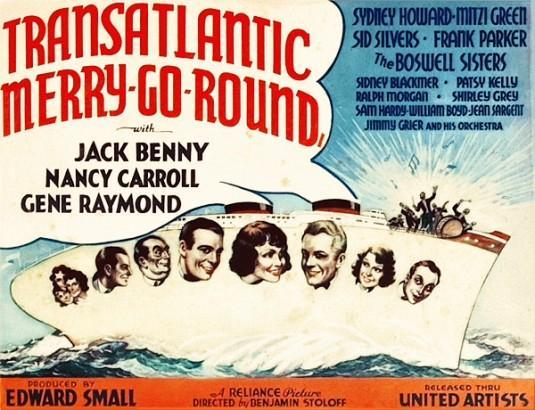
- Directed by: Benjamin Stoloff
- Written by: Leon Gordon
- Produced by: Edward Small
- Cinematography: Ted Tetzlaff
- Edited by: Hanson T. Fritch; Grant Whytock
- Music by: Alfred Newman; Richard A. Whiting
- Production company: Reliance Pictures
- Distributed by: United Artists
- Release date: November 2, 1934
- Running time: 91 minutes
- Country: United States
- Language: English

Transatlantic Merry-Go-Round is a 1934 American drama film with musical and comedic elements, directed by Benjamin Stoloff.

== Plot ==
Gangster Lee Lother is shot and killed during an ocean liner cruise, and we're introduced in flashback to the interwoven stories and characters of the suspects: con-man and jewel-thief Jimmy Brett and his accomplice, a wife who bids goodbye to her husband without realizing he'll stowaway to spy on her, the star of the ship's entertainment revue and her brother with gambling debts, and the Inspector who interrupts his vacation to solve the case.

== Cast ==
- Gene Raymond as Jimmy Brett
- Nancy Carroll as Sally Marsh
- Jack Benny as Chad Denby
- Sydney Howard as Dan Campbell, the Drunk
- Mitzi Green as Mitzi
- Sid Silvers as Shorty
- Frank Parker as Frank, the Tenor
- Sidney Blackmer as Lee Lother
- Ralph Morgan as Herbert Rosson
- Shirley Grey as Anya Rosson
- Patsy Kelly as Patsy Clarke
- Sam Hardy as Jack Summers
- William 'Stage' Boyd as Joe Saunders
- Robert Elliott as Inspector 'Mac' McKinney
- The Boswell Sisters as themselves
- Allan Cavan as Ship's Officer (uncredited)
- André Cheron as Frenchman (uncredited)
- Wallis Clark as Ship's Captain (uncredited)
- Don Douglas as Purser (uncredited)
- Bess Flowers as Woman in Audience (uncredited)
- Mary Forbes as Passenger (uncredited)
- Esther Howard as Passenger (uncredited)
- Wilfred Lucas as Policeman at Dock (uncredited)
- Tom McGuire as Detective (uncredited)
- Wedgwood Nowell as Waiter (uncredited)
- Dennis O'Keefe as Passenger Watching Revue (uncredited)
- Lee Phelps as Porter at Dock (uncredited)
- Syd Saylor as Campbell's Taxi Driver (uncredited)
- Larry Steers as Passenger Asked to Get Purser (uncredited)

== Production ==
London comic Sydney Howard was imported to star. The original title was London Showboat or Showboat of 1934.

The film's many musical numbers include a Busby Berkeley-like number with chorus girls in geometric patterns filmed from overhead. A song performed by The Boswell Sisters titled "Rock and Roll", written by Richard A. Whiting and Sidney Clare, is sometimes credited as the first use of that term in a popular song, although in this case the lyrics referred to the motion of the ocean.
