= Follow the Leader (1930 film) =

1930 film

- Directed by: Norman Taurog; Albert Parker
- Written by: Gertrude Purcell; Sid Silvers
- Produced by: Paramount Publix
- Starring: Ed Wynn; Ginger Rogers
- Cinematography: Larry Williams
- Edited by: Barney Rogan
- Music by: Buddy DeSylva; Ray Henderson
- Distributed by: Paramount Publix Corporation
- Release date: December 6, 1930
- Running time: 76 minutes
- Country: United States
- Language: English

Follow the Leader (also released as Manhattan Mary) is a 1930 American pre-Code musical comedy film co-directed by Norman Taurog and Albert Parker. It stars Ginger Rogers and Ed Wynn in his film debut. The screenplay by Gertrude Purcell and Sid Silvers is based on a play by William K. Wells, George White and Lew Brown, with songs by Buddy DeSylva and Ray Henderson. It was produced and distributed by Paramount Publix Corporation.

== Plot ==
Crickets is a not-terribly-bright waiter(and failed inventor) at a Times Square,NYC restaurant. One day,Crickets accidentally knocks out a gangster who was preparing to kill a rival.The rescued rival gangster puts his mob at Crickets' disposal for any favor he might want.

Crickets decides to help the restaurant owner's daughter Mary get her big break in show business.Sam Platz,a would-be-press agent--tags along with Crickets for no helpful reason.On her own,Mary lands a job as understudy to the star in a superhit musical,GEORGE WHITE'S SCANDALS. But this isn't enough for the mob.They insist Crickets kidnap the star,Helen King,so Mary will have to go on in her place.

Helen will be attending a fancy party at the 400 Club. Crickets does not understand the meaning of the word "kidnap" He arrives at the party carrying a medieval axe and a huge length of rope.And his "undercover waiter" job only draws undue attention to himself.And when the lights go out,Cricket kidnaps the wrong girl.The mob insists he try again---or else.

Mary's on-and-off boyfriend is musician Jimmy Moore,who breaks up with Mary when he sees her enter the party on t he arm of a notorious stage-door-Johnny.

Crickets amazingly succeeds in tying Helen King up in her own apartment---and then knocks himself out with his own sleeping potion. Mary is a hit in Helen's place, and a European producer offers her a big part in Paris' FOLIES BERGERE. Knowing Helen will be returning to the show,Mary accepts.

Six months pass and Mary returns home to fame and a huge welcome-home party.Jimmy Moore has graduated to leading his own orchestra and is no longer worried that fame will spoil Mary.As the lovers reconcile,Crickets knocks himself out demonstrating his "foolproof" mosquito-catching machine.

NOTES--This film is the talkie debout of Wynn,Merman,and Ginger Rogers.Merman sings the film's single song,"SATAN'S HOLIDAY".

== Cast ==
- Ed Wynn – Crickets
- Ginger Rogers – Mary Brennan
- Stanley Smith – Jimmy Moore
- Lou Holtz – Sam Platz
- Lida Lane – Ma Brennan
- Ethel Merman – Helen King
- Bobby Watson – George White
- Donald Kirke – R. C. Black
- William Halligan – Bob Sterling
- Holly Hall – Fritzie Devere
- Preston Foster – Two-Gun Terry
- James C. Morton – Mickie
- Tammany Young – Bull
- Jack La Rue – Gangster
- William Gargan – Gangster
- Eddie Roberts – Gangster
- William Black
- Dick Scott
- Jules Epailly – Gaston Duval
- Charles Henderson
