= Josette (1938 film) =

1938 film by Allan Dwan

- Directed by: Allan Dwan
- Written by: Paul Frank (play); Georg Fraser (play); László Vadnay; James Edward Grant
- Produced by: Gene Markey; Darryl F. Zanuck
- Starring: Don Ameche; Simone Simon; Robert Young; Joan Davis
- Cinematography: John J. Mescall
- Edited by: Robert L. Simpson
- Music by: Walter Scharf
- Production company: Twentieth Century Fox
- Distributed by: Twentieth Century Fox
- Release date: June 3, 1938
- Running time: 73 minutes
- Country: United States
- Language: English

Josette is a 1938 American comedy film directed by Allan Dwan and starring Don Ameche, Simone Simon and Robert Young. Two brothers fall in love with the same nightclub singer.

== Cast ==
- Don Ameche as David Brassard Jr.
- Simone Simon as Renee LeBlanc
- Robert Young as Pierre Brassard
- Joan Davis as May Morris
- Bert Lahr as Barney Barnaby
- Paul Hurst as A. Adolphus Heyman
- William Collier Sr. as David Brassard Sr.
- Tala Birell as Mlle. Josette
- Lynn Bari as Mrs. Elaine Dupree
- William Demarest as Joe, Diner Owner
- Ruth Gillette as Belle
- Armand Kaliz as Thomas
- Maurice Cass as Ed, the Furrier
- George H. Reed as Butler
- Paul McVey as Hotel manager
- Fred Kelsey as Hotel detective
- Robert Kellard as Reporter
- Robert Lowery as Rufe, Boatman
- Lon Chaney Jr. as Boatman
- Slim Martin as Orchestra leader
- June Gale as Cafe girl
- Ferdinand Gottschalk as Papa Le Blanc

== Critical reception ==
Picturegoer’s Lionel Collier wrote, "A little gaiety is a good thing these days, and it is supplied in good measure in Josette, a slight romantic farce in which Simone Simon appears to better advantage than she has done in any of her previous American pictures." Describing her performance as "a piquant, provocative study", he continued with further positive comments for other cast members, and wrote, "Robert Young is well in his element as the playboy, and Don Ameche affords a good contrast as David. Excellent comedy is supplied by Joan Davis as Josette's companion and Paul Hurst also adds to the fun in the role of a perpetually inebriated meddler in other people affairs."

== Bibliography ==
- Tucker, David C. Joan Davis: America's Queen of Film, Radio and Television Comedy. McFarland, 2014.
