= Spendthrift (film) =

1936 film by Raoul Walsh

- Directed by: Raoul Walsh
- Written by: Bert Hanlon; Eric Hatch
- Produced by: Walter Wanger
- Starring: Henry Fonda; Pat Paterson; Mary Brian
- Cinematography: Leon Shamroy
- Edited by: Robert L. Simpson
- Music by: Gerard Carbonara (uncredited); John Leipold
- Production company: Walter Wanger Productions
- Distributed by: Paramount Pictures
- Release date: July 22, 1936
- Running time: 80 minutes
- Country: United States
- Language: English
- Budget: $344,332
- Box office: $278,085

Spendthrift is a 1936 American romantic comedy film directed by Raoul Walsh and starring Henry Fonda, Pat Paterson, Mary Brian and George Barbier. It was produced by Walter Wanger for release by Paramount Pictures.

== Plot ==
The once fabulously wealthy Townsend Middleton has to sell his polo horses in order to enter his filly Black Mamba in the Kentucky Derby. He loses everything he has left, but then marries gold-digging Sally Barnaby who mistakenly believes he is still a millionaire. Valerie, Middleton's loyal trainer manages to hide Black Mamba so it isn't repossessed by his creditors. Despite being broke, Middleton finds it impossible to resists his new wife's extravagant demands. Ultimately Middleton realizes he is better suited to Valerie and, with the help of a very wealthy uncle, he restores his fortunes while Black Mamba wins a key race.

== Cast ==
- Henry Fonda as Townsend Middleton
- Pat Paterson as Valerie 'Boots' O'Connell
- Mary Brian as Sally Barnaby
- George Barbier as Uncle Morton Middleton
- Edward Brophy as Bill McGuire
- Richard Carle as Popsy
- J.M. Kerrigan as Pop O'Connell
- Spencer Charters as Col. Barnaby
- June Brewster as Topsy Martin
- Halliwell Hobbes as Beuhl - the Butler
- Jerry Mandy as Enrico
- Miki Morita as Valet
- Greta Meyer as Hilda - the Maid
- Robert Strange as Ransom

== Reception ==
The film recorded a loss of $126,925.
