= Lou Holtz (actor) =

American Jewish dialect vaudeville comedian and singer-actor (1893–1980)

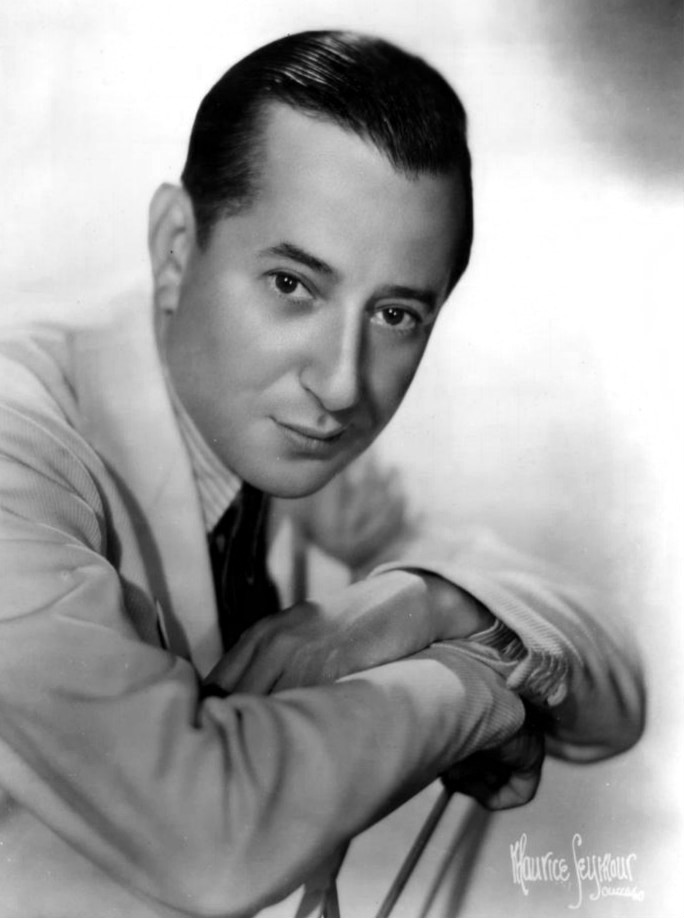
- Holtz in 1938
- Born: April 11, 1893; San Francisco, California, U.S.
- Died: September 22, 1980 (aged 87); Beverly Hills, California, U.S.
- Occupations: Actor; producer
- Years active: c. 1913–1940s
- Spouses: Rita Boland (divorced) Phyllis Gilman (divorced) Gloria Warfield (m. 1962)
- Children: 2

Lou Holtz (April 11, 1893 – September 22, 1980) was an American vaudevillian, comic actor, and theatrical producer.

== Early life ==
Lou Holtz was born 11 April 1893 in San Francisco, to Olga (née Levine) and Asher Holtz.

== Career ==
At fifteen, Holtz, with Boland, and Harris, were spotted by Elsie Janis's mother, while playing at the Crest, a popular night spot, in San Francisco, and she brought them to New York to work with her daughter as the Elsie Janis Trio. In May 1913, at the Palace Theatre (New York City), Holtz appeared in a trio, with Harris and Boland, presented by Elsie Janis, during the Sarah Bernhardt vaudeville tour. In 1915, he appeared in his first Broadway show, Harold Atteridge's A World of Pleasure for the Shubert Brothers. He appeared on Broadway in other shows with small parts.

"Lou Holtz had some excellent material..."
— Variety (April 4, 1919)

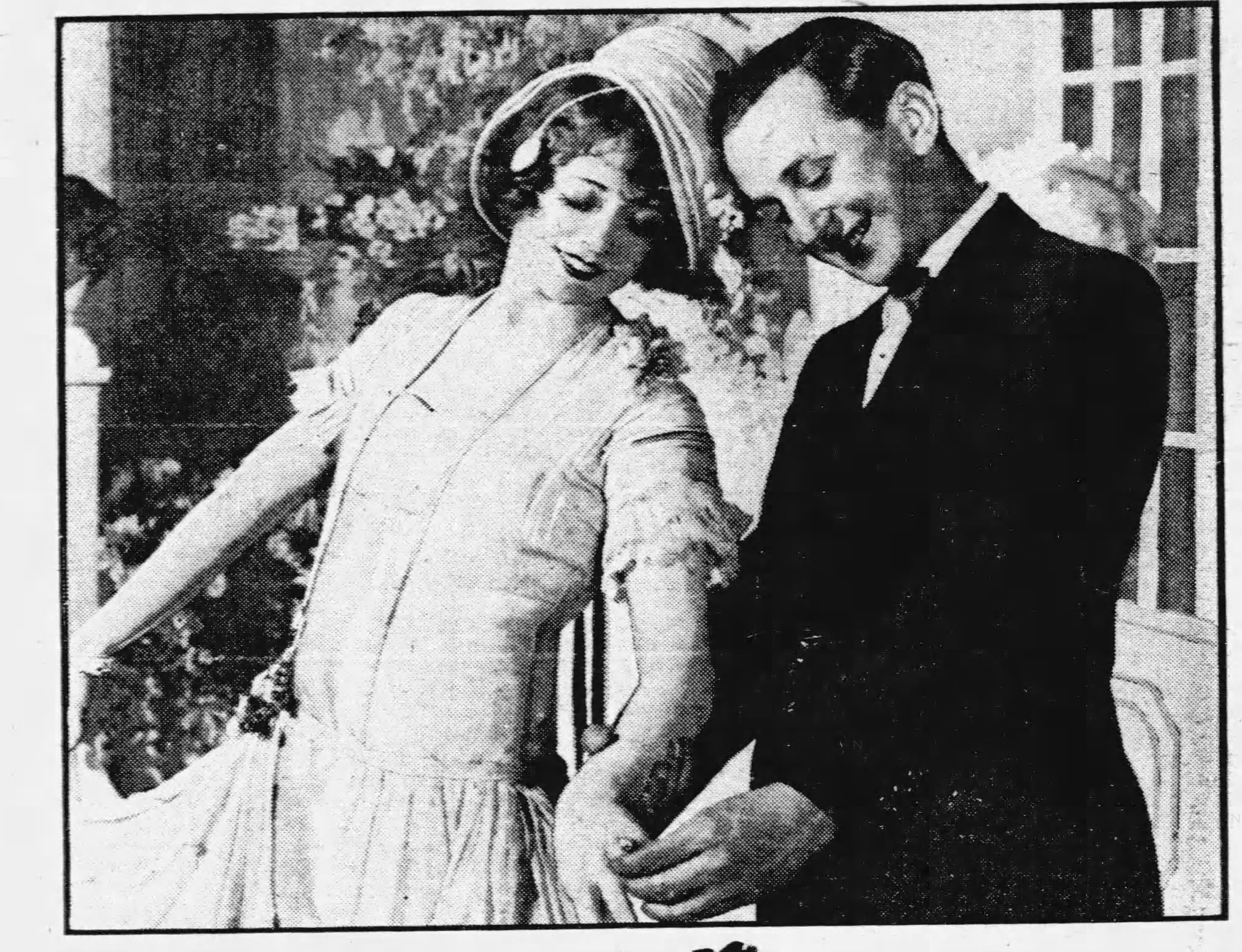
Holtz with Esther Howard in Tell Me More

He then became a star in George White's Scandals of 1919. He reappeared in the Scandals in 1920 and 1921. Holtz became a close good friend of George Gershwin when appearing in the Scandals, which Gershwin wrote the music for. Gershwin later wrote Tell Me More, a musical, for Holtz in 1925, which was not received favorably and was short-lived on Broadway.

In the 1920s, Holtz' career alternated between musical comedies and vaudeville shows where he was the headliner. He reached one of his career milestones in 1925 when he played the Palace Theater as the headliner. The Palace was the most prestigious theatre in the country, and Holtz broke all records there by playing for 10 weeks. In 1931–1932, Holtz repeated this feat at the Palace a second time. He also starred in and produced a similar show at the competing Hollywood Theater that outgrossed the Palace Show. In vaudeville shows and radio, Holtz' comedy was based in telling long, character stories, usually with at least one character having a strong Jewish dialect. His most famous character, Sam Lapidus, stayed with Holtz for his entire career, including Holtz' guest stints on the Merv Griffin Show in the 1970s.

In the 1920s, Holtz became the highest paid entertainer on Broadway, with articles touting his salary as an unheard of $6,000 per week.

In 1927, Holtz appeared in Ziegfeld Follies of 1927 at the New Amsterdam Theatre.

Holtz had a big hit on Broadway in 1931 when he hired his pianist, Harold Arlen, to write a show for him. The musical, which Holtz produced, was called ″You Said It″ (music by Harold Arlen and lyrics and book by Jack Yellen) and the show ran on Broadway for 192 performances. Holtz's pianist, Harold Arlen, would go on to write the music for The Wizard of Oz in 1939.

In the 1930s, while still appearing on Broadway, Holtz left New York twice for London and appeared in two hits at the London Palladium: Laughter Over London and Transatlantic Rhythm. Also in the 1930s, Holtz became a regular on radio. He had long stints on The Rudy Vallee Show, The Paul Whiteman Show and others. Holtz ended with several radio shows of his own, including The Lou Holtz Laugh Club. One of the regulars on that show was Fanny Brice. In 1939, Frances Upton appeared with him on WABC-Columbia 10 p.m. on Fridays. Holtz' last two shows on Broadway were Priorities of 1942 and Star Time (1944).

Holtz' career after the mid-1940s consisted of high-end club dates, including headlining in Las Vegas, and television appearances on variety shows. He appeared on The Ed Sullivan Show twice in 1957 and The Tonight Show Starring Johnny Carson twice in the 1960s. He appeared on Jack Paar's Tonight Show more than 20 times, and appeared on Steve Allen's Tonight Show seven times. In 1973, Holtz turned 80 years old but still appeared on the Merv Griffin Show throughout the 1970s.

Holtz's other credits include the feature film Follow The Leader (1930). This film starred Ed Wynn with a large supporting role for Holtz. The film was based on the musical that Wynn and Holtz starred in on Broadway called Manhattan Mary. The film also was the first movie that stars Ginger Rogers and Ethel Merman appeared. Holtz also starred in the Columbia musical short School for Romance in 1934, which co-starred a then unknown Betty Grable. Holtz' early standup comedy routine was memorialized in a 1929 Vitaphone short.

In an interview with the Los Angeles Times in 1989, George Burns was asked who the greatest comedian was that he ever saw. Burns replied that it was Jack Benny, but Burns named Holtz and several others as coming right after Benny.

== Personal life ==
Holtz married Rita Boland, and then divorced, married Phyllis Gilman, and then divorced.

In the 1940s, Holtz retired to Los Angeles. In 1962, Holtz married his third wife, Gloria Warfield, who remained with him until his death in 1980. In 1963, Holtz and his wife moved to Los Angeles and gave birth to a son, Lou Jr. In 1965, Holtz and his wife, had another son, Richard.

Holtz' final years were spent going to Hillcrest Country Club in Los Angeles for lunch daily and sitting at a round table of comedians, which included performers like George Burns, Jack Benny, the Marx Brothers, Milton Berle, and George Jessel.

== Filmography ==
- Idle Chatter (1930)
- Follow The Leader (1930)
- School for Romance (1934)
- When Do We Eat? (1934)

== Sources ==
- Fisher, James (February 2000). "Holtz, Lou (1893-1980), vaudevillian and ethnic comedian". American National Biography. 1. Oxford University Press. doi:10.1093/anb/9780198606697.article.1801739.
