= Legion of Terror =

1936 film by Charles C. Coleman

- Directed by: Charles C. Coleman
- Written by: Bert Granet
- Produced by: Ralph Cohn
- Starring: Bruce Cabot; Marguerite Churchill; Ward Bond; Crawford Weaver
- Cinematography: George Meehan
- Edited by: Al Clark
- Music by: Louis Silvers
- Production company: Columbia Pictures
- Distributed by: Columbia Pictures
- Release date: November 1, 1936
- Running time: 63 minutes
- Country: United States
- Language: English

Legion of Terror is a 1936 American drama/action film, directed by Charles C. Coleman. The film, which stars Bruce Cabot, Marguerite Churchill, Ward Bond, and Crawford Weaver, is a fictionalized story about the real-life Ku Klux Klan splinter group called the Black Legion of the 1930s. It was inspired by the May 1935 murder in Michigan of Charles Poole, a Works Progress Administration worker.

The film preceded and also inspired the making of the critically acclaimed 1937 Warner Bros. feature film Black Legion, which co-starred Humphrey Bogart, Dick Foran, Erin O'Brien-Moore and Ann Sheridan and which was based on the same case.

== Plot ==
In Washington, D.C., Frank Marshall and his friend, "Slim" Hewitt, are both sworn in as postal inspectors. After a bomb which was sent from the (fictional) town of Stanfield, Connecticut, that was addressed to U.S. Senator Morton is found in the Senate mailroom, Frank and Slim are both sent to Stanfield to investigate. On the train, Frank becomes acquainted with one Nancy Foster, a resident of Stanfield. When they arrive, Frank and Slim take on assumed names and get jobs in a local factory. When Frank goes to Nancy's house for dinner, her brother Don tells him that the Hood Legion (a group similar to that of the 1930s militant separatist political/fascist paramilitary group Black Legion) has complete control of the town.

Soon Frank and Slim both realize that the factory where they work as well as the local newspaper is in the legion's control. Don has received several threatening letters advising him to join the legion. Frank and Slim successfully infiltrate the group by undergoing an initiation ceremony in which masked members in long robes blindfold Frank and Slim and hold guns to their heads before giving them each a bullet as a token of their membership.

When Don complains to Colonel McCollum, a local newspaper editor, about his refusal to print Don's allegations against the legion's nefarious activities, Don is framed and arrested for drunk driving. Although he is released, he is ostracized by the townspeople. McCollum then orders his men to take Don to the legion's secret tribunal into the woods, where Don is tried, found guilty, and shot to death by legion members. Nancy tries to go to the police to report the incident, but they are unable to find the killers. When Frank tries to convey his sympathy to Nancy, she forces him to confess his membership in the legion, and vows never to speak to him again.

When Nancy then goes to the owner of the newspaper with her story, he upbraids McCollum, causing him to decide that Nancy should be tried by the legion's tribunal. Slim then confronts McCollum with the knowledge that the legion killed Don, and he is taken to the legion's meeting ground to be tried as a traitor. When Frank learns that Nancy and Slim are being held prisoner, he goes to the governor and secures the National Guard, which rescues Nancy and Slim and arrests the legion members. It is then revealed that McCollum was the leader of the legion, after which he and his assistant try to escape, but are burned to death when their car overturns. Frank then reveals his true identity to Nancy, and they make plans to marry. Later, in the Post Office Department in Washington, D.C., the chief inspector congratulates Frank and Slim for their work, but warns them that Americans are a nation of "joiners", and as such are susceptible to organizations such as the Ku Klux Klan and the Hooded Legion, which they join believing they are being patriotic, when in fact they are placing themselves in the hands of racketeers who operate the legions solely for their own benefit.

== Cast ==
- Bruce Cabot as Frank Marshall
- Marguerite Churchill as Nancy Foster
- Crawford Weaver as Slim Hewitt
- Ward Bond as Don Foster
- Charles C. Wilson as Colonel McCollum
- John Hamilton as Cummings
- Arthur Loft as Gardner
- Nick Copeland as Lefty
- Harry Davenport as Senator Morton (uncredited)
- Ethan Laidlaw as Townsman (uncredited)
- Edward LeSaint as Breardon (uncredited)
- Edward Peil Sr. as Bradley (uncredited)

== Notes ==
Variety magazine called Legion of Terror "an indictment of crackpot politico-fraternal organizations." This film marked Crawford Weaver's film debut.
