= Little Men =

1871 novel by Louisa May Alcott

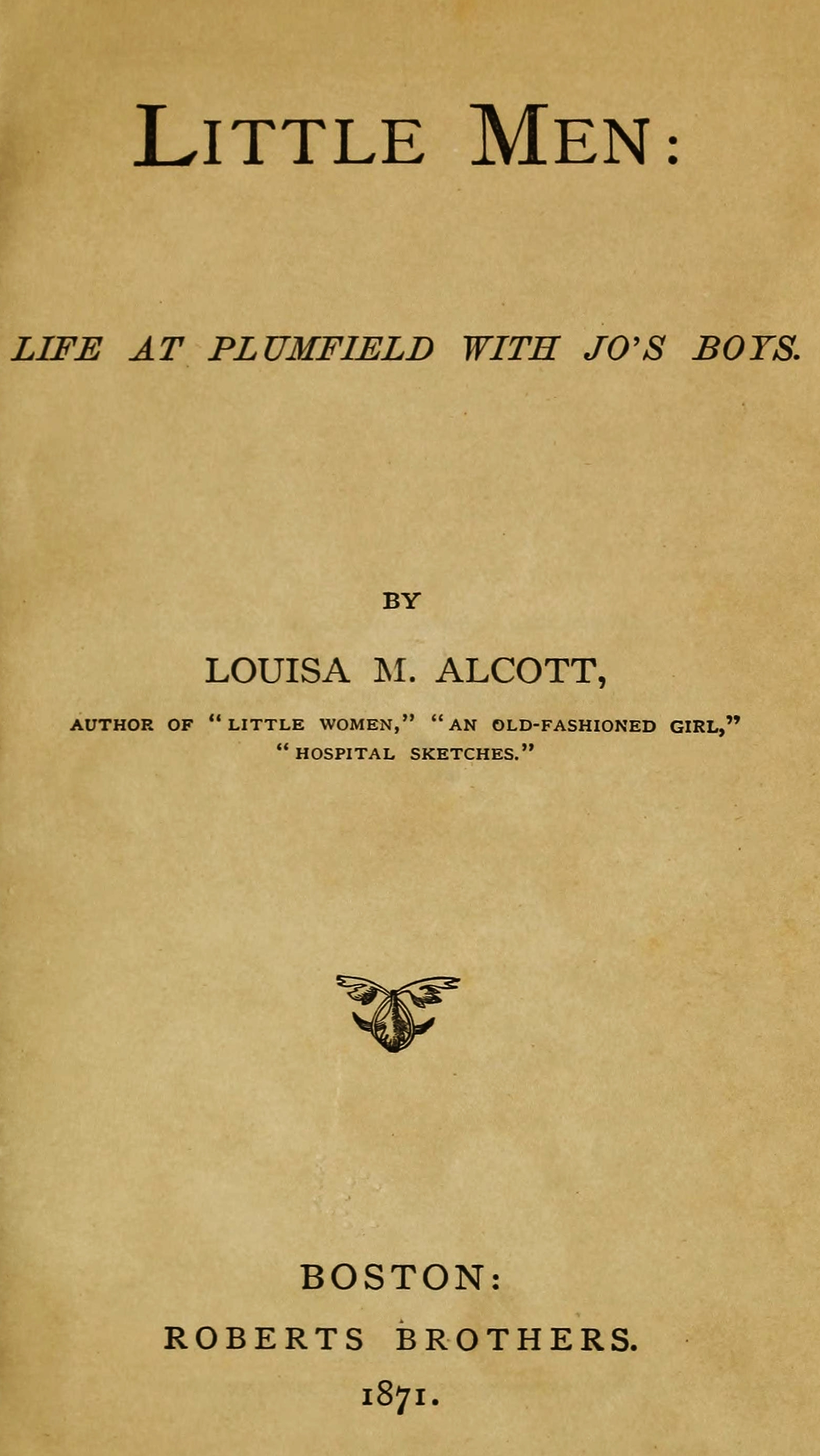
- First edition title page
- Author: Louisa May Alcott
- Language: English
- Series: Little Women
- Genre: Children's literature
- Publisher: Roberts Brothers
- Publication date: 1871
- Publication place: United States
- Media type: Print
- Pages: 376 (first edition)
- Preceded by: Little Women
- Followed by: Jo's Boys
- Text: Little Men at Wikisource

Little Men: Life at Plumfield with Jo's Boys, is a children's novel by American author Louisa May Alcott (1832–1888). First published in 1871 by Roberts Brothers, the book reprises characters from Alcott's 1868–69 two-volume novel Little Women, and acts as a sequel in the unofficial Little Women trilogy. The trilogy ends with Alcott's 1886 novel Jo's Boys, and How They Turned Out: A Sequel to "Little Men".

Little Men describes the life of Jo Bhaer and her husband as they run a school and educate the various children at Plumfield. The teaching methods used at Plumfield reflect transcendentalist ideals followed by Alcott's father, Bronson Alcott. Book education is combined with learning about morals and nature as the children learn through experience. Paradoxes in the story serve to emphasize Alcott's views on social norms.

Little Men was written following the death of Alcott's brother-in-law, John Bridge Pratt, who inspired the character John Brooke, while Alcott was visiting Rome. By June 1871, the book had sold 130,000 copies. Reviews at the time said Little Men had the same charm as Alcott's other books, although it was overly idealistic at times, and that Alcott had depicted children well in her writing.

Alcott's classic novel has been adapted to a 1934 film, a 1940 film, a 1998 film, a television series, and a Japanese animated television series.

== Plot ==
The story begins with the arrival of Nat Blake at Plumfield, the school run by Professor Bhaer and Mrs. Josephine Bhaer (née March). Nat, a shy young orphan with a habit of telling fibs, charms the ten other boys attending the school, as well as Mr. and Mrs. Bhaer, with fiddle skills learned from his father. Mrs. Bhaer shares with him that every Sunday, she reviews each student's behavior and whether they were good or they disappointed her that week. Nat resolves to make her proud.

Nat quickly realizes Plumfield is not run by conventional means. Fifteen-minute pillow fights are permitted on Saturdays to keep mischief during the week to a minimum. All the children have their own gardens and pets, and are encouraged to be independent. Nat soon forms a friendship with Tommy Bangs, the troublemaker of the school, who keeps chickens and allows Nat to keep one egg from every dozen found. Nat dreams of buying his own violin with his egg profits. Demi and Daisy, Meg's twin children, also live at Plumfield and Nat becomes close friends with them.

Mr. Bhaer cures Nat of his fibbing habit by making him strike Mr. Bhaer's hand with a ruler when he is caught lying. Nat is only consoled by playing his violin and walking with Daisy, who is normally excluded from playing with the boys. Mrs. Bhaer and Laurie surprise her with a tiny, functional kitchen which the boys are not allowed to play with, and she puts on little parties for the boys with her meager cooking skills.

Nat's wild friend Dan comes to live at Plumfield. Dan originally decides the other boys are "molly-coddles" and leads them in experiments with boxing, drinking, smoking, profanity, and card games. When one of his games starts the house on fire, Dan, along with Mr. Bhaer's nephews Franz and Emil, put out the fire, and he is sent away to a farm in the country.

Nan arrives as a companion for Daisy, but she is even more of a tomboy than Jo was as a teenager and gets into all sorts of trouble. Dan runs away, and drawn by the idea of seeing the Bhaers again, returns to Plumfield with a broken foot and is nursed back to health by Mrs. Bhaer. When Laurie sponsors a new natural history museum for the school, Dan becomes curator because of his interest in the outdoors.

One day, everyone goes to pick berries and Nan promises to take care of little Rob, but they end up missing the wagon back home. After a joyful reunion, the next day Mrs. Bhaer teaches them a lesson by tying Nan up to a string in one room for the day. Later, Laurie and Amy's daughter, Bess, comes for a visit and all the boys respect her so greatly that their behavior improves from her presence. When Nat is falsely accused of theft by the other boys, Dan takes the fall so Nat is no longer shunned. Dan saves another student named Jack from a fall, leading Jack to admit he stole the money and leave the school. The boys plan to buy Dan a microscope for his kindness. Although Dan cares more for the Bhaers than before, he begins to long for freedom again and Mrs. Bhaer attempts to keep him home with various tasks.

Near the end of the novel, Demi and Daisy's father, John, becomes ill. They are taken to visit him and he dies that night, leaving Demi with an increased feeling of responsibility. A short while later, the boys have a story night in which they trick members of the household into the schoolroom and only let them out when they tell a story. Mr. and Mrs. Bhaer tell moral-based stories of hard work and kindness. At Thanksgiving, they feast on the harvest of each boy's garden, giving thanks for all they have learned and been given, and then they end the night with a play.

== Analysis and major themes ==
Little Men combines the genres of the domestic novel and the school story. Popular school stories of Alcott's time generally involved a newcomer in a group of British boys growing in skill, often fighting a bully or competing in sports. Alcott transforms the traditional, however; females take part where they rarely appear in other school stories, and Plumfield is both school and home, the residents both peers and family. Mrs. Jo is the center of the school, with Professor Bhaer rarely appearing outside the classroom and more scenes set outside the classroom than in.

One recurring theme comes from Professor Bhaer's allegory about a gardener and how some of the undergardeners reaped rewards while others did not. The children talk about the morals they will each work to grow and come to "view themselves as little garden plots growing large crops of patience, perseverance, and good temper."

=== Education ===
Alcott's exploration of education through a novel instead of a more formal setting allows her to explore results for individual students instead of using abstract generalization. Mrs. Bhaer professes the belief that children become miserable with too many rules and too much study, and the students learn in different ways to help others, control their temper, and exercise. Their different accomplishments are valued. Dan has no crop, but collects wild nuts instead; Nan grows herbs instead of a crop because of her interest in medicine; Dolly memorizes a report to make up for his stutter. Mrs. Bhaer shares with Laurie that unlike her previous aspirations, she simply wants the boys to grow into "honest men".

The educational methods employed reflect the Pestalozzian idea Bronson Alcott ascribed to that "the best education starts at home and is continued in a homelike school." Little Men combines school and home for its students, particularly to teach both discipline and knowledge. Ralph Waldo Emerson theorized that learning about nature led humans to learn about the inner workings of their minds as well. He believed this understanding must be balanced by book knowledge to prepare a student for society and that colleges should prepare students to create reform for "new national needs". Alcott translates these transcendentalist ideals for younger students, particularly drawing on her father's approaches from Fruitlands and Temple School.

==== Science ====
Scientific knowledge in Little Men comes from the children's play rather than the curriculum at Plumfield. This knowledge proves useful for Dan and Nan, the more wild students of Plumfield; Nan is able to gain experience for her future career as a doctor by using her own herbs, which she dries and practices healing with. Alcott's own scientific education mainly came from nature walks with Thoreau and Sophie Foord.

=== Contradiction ===
Many paradoxes appear in Little Men and can be viewed either as inconsistencies or as messages. Contradictions in the novel frequently comment on social norms; the boys school enrolls girls, the instructors often learn lessons from the children, and the characters themselves carry inner contradictions. Bess, for example, is the youngest girl, yet she symbolizes feminine influence. Violence is not allowed at Plumfield, yet multiple fights occur and Professor Bhaer shares his grandmother once taught him a lesson by cutting the tip of his tongue. Instead of hitting Nat to punish him for lying, the professor has Nat hit him. Critics suggest these contradictions reflect Alcott's feminism restrained by certain social norms and help reveal her views on socialization, education, and morality. Children's literature researcher Hisham Muhamad Ismail concludes the differences between "intentional lessons and unconscious messages" add a level of confusion throughout Alcott's writing, particularly in Little Women, and affect her message along with the reception of the novel.

≥=== Play === Playing among the children often mirrors adult activities and responsibilities. The children grow crops, run a museum, have social clubs, raise children (dolls), and cook meals. The play violence comes in imitating "bullfighters, gladiators, or the imaginary ladies who torture Teddy". While the children learn the value of hard work and duty, play is relatively unregulated as it helps the children to develop their talents.

== Background and publication history ==
Alcott was first encouraged by her publisher to write a book for girls while employed as an editor for a Boston children's magazine and began writing the March trilogy a year later in 1868. After her brother-in-law John Pratt, whom the character John Brooke is based on, died of a sudden illness, she resolved to give the profits of the Little Women sequel to her sister to help support the family. With this motivation, she quickly finished the manuscript of Little Men while visiting Rome around Christmas, and the first edition, containing 376 pages, was published by Roberts Brothers in 1871. The book was released the day Alcott returned from her travels abroad. The Taunton Daily Gazette reported 130,000 copies of the book had been sold by June 3, 1871.

Alcott wrote Little Men with no plan beyond describing life at Plumfield. The novel depicts the school as a utopia of coeducation and takes ideas from Alcott's father, Bronson Alcott, “an educational reformer and prominent Transcendentalist.” Alcott said her father's Temple School inspired some of the scenes at Plumfield. Jo's procedure of taking notes on the children's behavior was employed at Bronson's school, Fruitlands, however, Jo's notes were shared in private while Bronson's were shared in public. Alcott commented she felt trapped into propriety having grown up around her father and others like Ralph Waldo Emerson. Additionally, while many say Plumfield is inspired by Temple School or Fruitlands, Alcott herself was a teacher and would have had plenty of her own knowledge and understanding of educational reform during her time.

== Reception ==
Little Men received many positive reviews although some cautioned that it was overly sentimental or idealistic. While Plumfield is meant to be a progressive school, literary scholar William Blackburn mentioned its impracticality and said that while Dan gets the closest, none of the students truly challenge the educational theories because every one of them accepts Plumfield ideals. Blackburn called the result "charmingly impossible."

The Springfield Daily Republican reviewed book and said "it is evident that Miss Alcott [...] has drawn many of her incidents from real experiences in her own family." Jo was praised as a leader of reform and seen as "in her element with a baker's dozen of boys around her." Generally, the book was found slightly lacking compared to Little Women; one newspaper said it was inferior but still "full of fun and spirit." Another called it "full of the charming naturalness, sweet simplicity and tender sentiment so peculiarly portrayed by this author in her previous works."

Newspapers commented the book was written with "characteristic" style compared to Alcott's other works. Critics said of "Little Men" that Alcott was particularly good at capturing children's humor and uniqueness and that her approach to education for children allowed her to demonstrate individual results rather than abstract ideas. Other reviews commented the idealistic approach to children was well intentioned with the potential to teach parents and leaders, although unrealistic. Springfield Daily Union suggested the book was aimed towards young readers alone, calling it "a bright little juvenile work which will make the young people half crazy with delight," while Hartford Daily Courant and The New-York Times said it would teach and entertain both young and old, particularly boys.

== Adaptations ==
=== Film ===
Little Men was first adapted into a film in 1934 starring Erin O'Brien-Moore and Ralph Morgan. Another film followed in 1940 with Kay Francis as Jo. In 1998, a Canadian feature adaptation starring Mariel Hemingway and Chris Sarandon was released. A Variety review complimented the talent of the young actors, although it also called the 1998 film overly sentimental, saying it was "long on morality but weak on dramatic tension".

=== Television ===
In 1960, Shirley Temple's Storybook aired an adaptation of Little Men. In 1993, an animated television series produced by Nippon Animation, Little Women II: Jo's Boys, ran in Japan. Additionally, a Canadian television series, Little Men, aired in 1998 to 1999 for two seasons. In the show, Professor Bhaer has died and Jo runs Plumfield. Regarding the first three episodes, Variety reviewed that the children spoke too much like adults and the show was unoriginal.
