= Ring Around the Moon (film) =

1936 film by Charles Lamont

- Directed by: Charles Lamont
- Written by: Vera Hobart (novel); Paul Perez
- Produced by: George R. Batcheller
- Starring: Donald Cook; Erin O'Brien-Moore; Ann Doran
- Cinematography: M.A. Anderson
- Edited by: Roland D. Reed
- Production company: Chesterfield Pictures
- Distributed by: Chesterfield Pictures
- Release date: February 15, 1936
- Running time: 65 minutes
- Country: United States
- Language: English

Ring Around the Moon is a 1936 American drama film directed by Charles Lamont and starring Donald Cook, Erin O'Brien-Moore and Ann Doran. It was produced and distributed by Chesterfield Pictures shortly before the company was taken over by Republic Pictures.

== Cast ==
- Donald Cook as Ross Graham
- Erin O'Brien-Moore as Gloria Endicott
- Ann Doran as Kay Duncan
- Alan Edwards as Pete Mattland
- Douglas Fowley as Ted Curlew
- John Qualen as Bill Harvey
- Barbara Bedford as Carol Anderson
- Dot Farley as Bella
- Mildred Gover as Emma
- John Miltern as Mr. Endicott
- Eddie Phillips as Charlie
- Vera Steadman as Mayme
- Carl Stockdale as Brenton
- Richard Tucker as Baxter

== Bibliography ==
- Goble, Alan. The Complete Index to Literary Sources in Film. Walter de Gruyter, 1999.
