= Anne Morrison Chapin =

American playwright, actress, and screenwriter

- Born: Mary Anne Morrison; January 5, 1892; Shoals, Indiana, US
- Died: April 7, 1967 (aged 75); Hollywood, California, US
- Occupations: Screenwriter, playwright, actress
- Spouse: Newton Chapin

Anne Morrison Chapin (born Mary Anne Morrison and sometimes credited as Anne Morrison) was an American playwright, actress, and screenwriter.

== Biography ==
=== Beginnings ===
Morrison Chapin was born in Shoals, Indiana. "My family were New Englanders of English stock, with just a drop of Southern blood, but I am truly Western," she told reporters. She'd also spend time in Indianapolis, where she underwent training to go into business before she was called to the stage.

=== On the stage ===
After studying at the American Academy of Dramatic Arts, she began working as an actress in Pittsburgh and New York City, appearing in a number of Broadway theatre productions in addition to writing her own plays. In 1920, she opened her play The Wild Westcotts; she also appeared in the play in a lead role, and traveled around the country nonstop through 1923. She continued writing and acting in plays on the East Coast through the 1920s.

=== Hollywood calls ===
Hollywood took an interest in Morrison Chapin's writing talents, and by 1934, she had given up acting to pursue a screenwriting career. She'd write scripts in Hollywood for the next 14 years, ending her career at Metro-Goldwyn-Mayer (MGM).

=== Personal life ===
In 1928, she married Newton Chapin; it was her second marriage. She died in 1967 in her West Hollywood home after a long illness, and was survived by a son, James.

== Selected filmography ==
- Dangerous Corner (1934)
- The Soldier and the Lady (1937)
- Romance in the Dark (1938)
- Listen, Darling (1938)
- Dancing on a Dime (1940)
- Sunset in Wyoming (1941)
- The Sailor Takes a Wife (1945)
- The Secret Heart (1946)
- High Barbaree (1947)
- Big City (1948)

== Selected theatrical works ==
- How Much Do You Love Me? (1920)
- The Wild Westcotts (1920)
- Pigs (1924)
- Wilbur (1928)
- Jonesy (1929)
- Love and Learn (1931)
- Broken Doll (1932)
- No Questions Asked (1934)
