= Black Legion (film) =

1937 film by Archie Mayo

- Theatrical poster
- Directed by: Archie Mayo; Michael Curtiz (uncredited)
- Screenplay by: Abem Finkel; William Wister Haines
- Story by: Robert Lord
- Produced by: Robert Lord
- Starring: Humphrey Bogart; Dick Foran; Erin O'Brien-Moore; Ann Sheridan
- Cinematography: George Barnes
- Edited by: Owen Marks
- Music by: W. Franke Harling; Howard Jackson; Bernhard Kaun
- Production company: Warner Bros. Pictures
- Distributed by: Warner Bros. Pictures
- Release dates: January 27, 1937 (New York City); January 30, 1937 (United States)
- Running time: 83 minutes
- Country: United States
- Language: English
- Budget: $235,000

Black Legion is a 1937 American crime drama film, directed by Archie Mayo, with a script by Abem Finkel and William Wister Haines based on an original story by producer Robert Lord. The film stars Humphrey Bogart, Dick Foran, Erin O'Brien-Moore and Ann Sheridan. It is a fictionalized treatment of the historic Black Legion of the 1930s in Michigan, a white terrorist group. A third of its members lived in Detroit, which had also been a center of the Ku Klux Klan in the 1920s.

The plot is based on the May 1935 kidnapping and murder in Detroit of Charles A. Poole, a Works Progress Administration organizer. Twelve men were tried and 11 convicted of his murder; all were sentenced to life. Authorities prosecuted another 37 men for related crimes; they were also convicted and sentenced to prison, breaking up the Legion. Columbia Pictures had made Legion of Terror (1936) based on the same case.

Black Legion was praised by critics for its dramatization of a dark social phenomenon. It was one of several films of this period in opposition to fascist and racist organizations. Having followed Bogart's breakthrough in The Petrified Forest (1936), a number of reviewers commented that Bogart's performance should lead to his becoming a major star. Warner Bros. Pictures did not give the film any special treatment, however, promoting it and Bogart in their standard fashion. Stardom did come with High Sierra in 1941.

== Plot ==
Frank Taylor, a Midwestern factory worker, expects to get promoted. Instead, he is passed over in favor of a young, hard-working Polish immigrant. Taylor joins the Black Legion, a secret hate group. Dressed in black hood and robes, Taylor and the Legion go on a torchlight raid, driving the Pole and his family from their town. Taylor then gets the promotion, and all seems well. But one day, while Frank uses a bathroom break recruiting new members for the Legion, an industrial accident results, costing the company an expensive machine. Taylor is held responsible. He is demoted in favor of an Irish co-worker, Mike Grogan. That night, the Black Legion abducts Grogan and ties him to a tree. He is then tortured.

Taylor's co-worker and friend, Ed Jackson, who is married to Grogan's daughter, suspects Taylor is connected to the local attacks on immigrants. Jackson mentions his concerns to Taylor's wife, Ruth, who confronts Taylor. When he responds to her with violence, Ruth leaves him. As his Black Legion activities and drinking increases, Taylor loses his job and begins a relationship with a woman of ill repute. Seeing his friend's life unraveling, Jackson displays concern. A drunken Taylor tells Jackson about his secret life with the violent Legion. Afraid that his own confession may prompt Jackson to go to the police, Taylor informs the Black Legion's leadership. They order Taylor to capture and execute Jackson.

Meantime, Jackson is unafraid. Indeed, he now threatens to inform local authorities. One evening, Taylor and disguised Legion members kidnap Jackson, who briefly escapes. In a panic, Taylor shoots and kills him. Later, Taylor is arrested for Jackson's murder. Ruth returns for Taylor's trial to support him. The lawyer for the Black Legion threatens Taylor's wife and son to stop him from implicating the hate group. But filled with remorse and self-loathing, Taylor tells the truth in court. All local members of the Black Legion are thus sentenced to life in prison for Jackson's murder—including Frank Taylor.

== Cast ==
- Humphrey Bogart as Frank Taylor
- Dick Foran as Ed Jackson
- Erin O'Brien-Moore as Ruth Taylor
- Ann Sheridan as Betty Grogan
- Helen Flint as Pearl Danvers
- Joseph Sawyer as Cliff Moore
- Clifford Soubier as Mike Grogan
- Alonzo Price as Alf Hargrave
- Paul Harvey as Billings
- Dickie Jones as Buddy Taylor
- Samuel Hinds as Judge
- Addison Richards as Prosecuting Attorney
- Eddie Acuff as Metcalf
- Dorothy Vaughan as Mrs. Grogan
- John Litel as Tommy Smith
- Henry Brandon as Joe Dombrowski
- Charles Halton as Osgood
- Pat C. Flick as Nick Strumpas
- Francis Sayles as Charlie
- Paul Stanton as Barham
- Harry Hayden as Jones
- Egon Brecher as Old Man Dombrowski (credited as Dombrowski Sr.)
- Robert Homans as Motorcycle Cop (uncredited)
- Jack Mower as Court Clerk (uncredited)

== Production ==
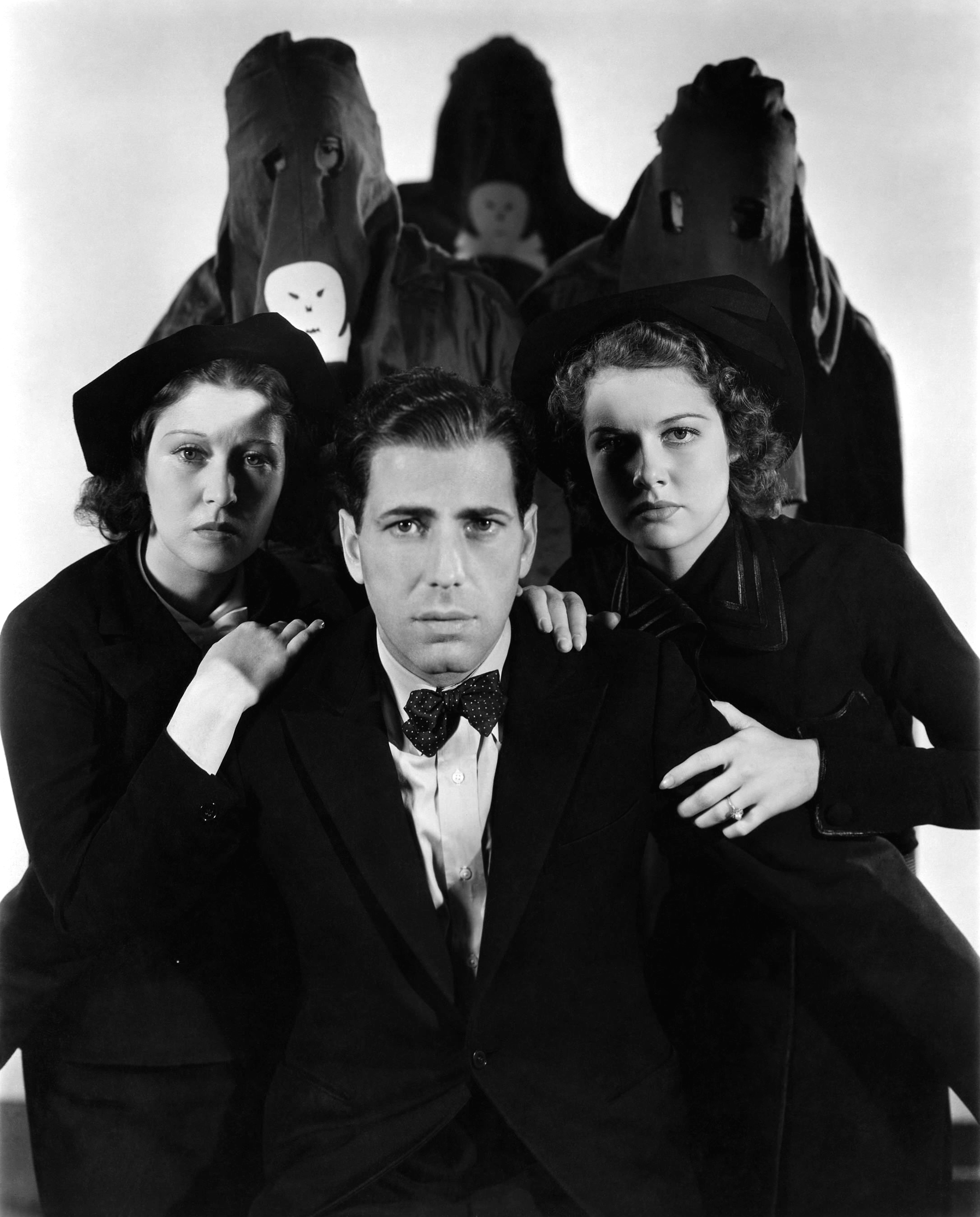
Erin O'Brien-Moore, Humphrey Bogart and Ann Sheridan

Black Legion went into production in late August 1936. Many of the details about the Legion portrayed in the film, such as the initiation oath and the confessions in the trial scenes, were based on known facts about the historic organization. Because United States libel laws had recently been broadened in scope by court rulings, Warner Brothers underplayed some aspects of the group's political activities to avoid legal repercussion. The Ku Klux Klan sued Warners for patent infringement over the film's use of a Klan-like insignia: a white cross on a red background with a black square. A judge threw out the case.

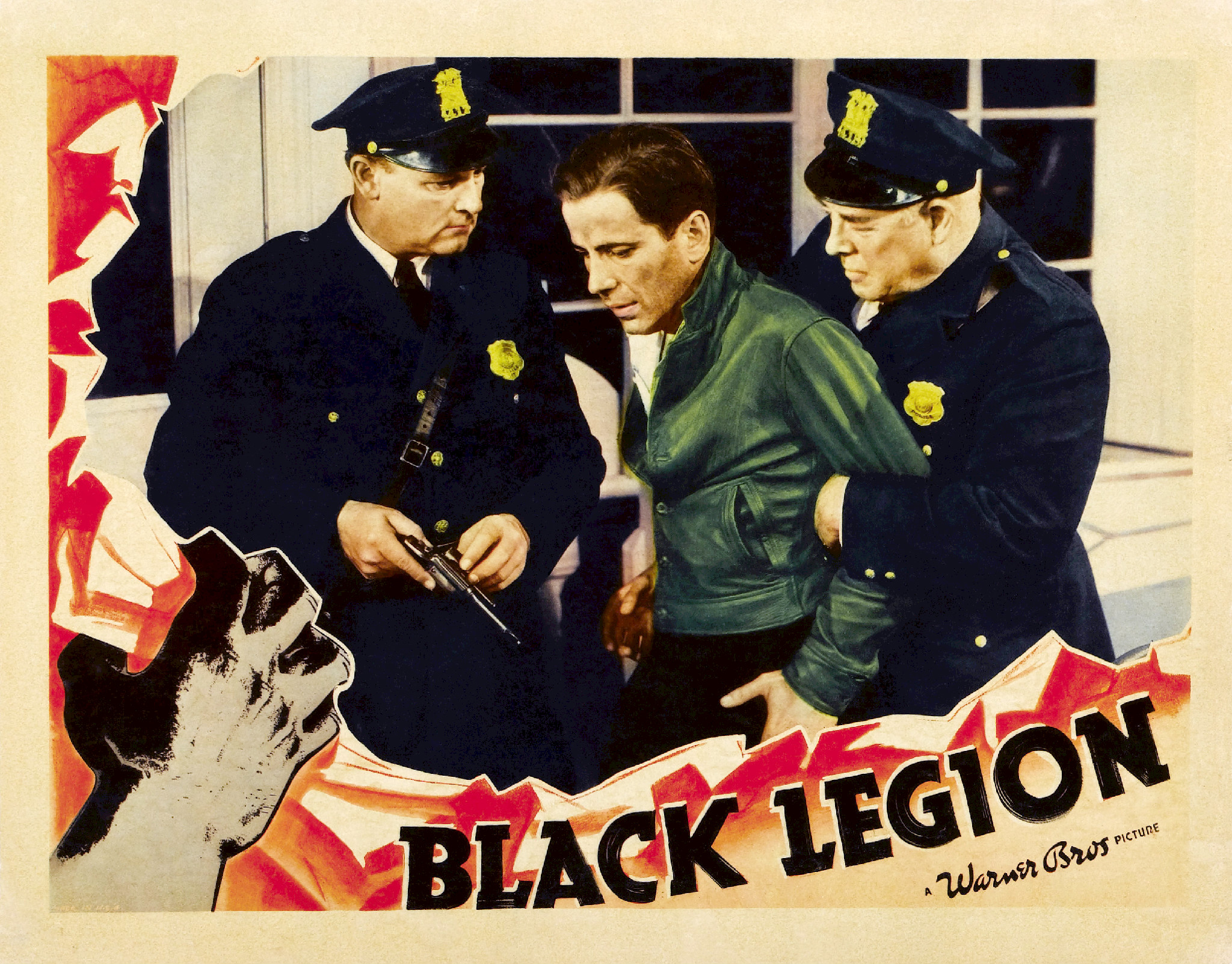
Lobby card for Black Legion

Location shooting took place in private homes in the Hollywood area, the Providencia Ranch in the Hollywood Hills and the Warner Ranch in Calabasas. Executive producer Hal B. Wallis had wanted Edward G. Robinson to play the lead role, but producer Robert Lord thought Robinson was too foreign looking, and wanted a "distinctly American looking actor to play [the] part."

== Reception ==
Writing for Night and Day in 1937, Graham Greene gave the film a good review, characterizing it as "an intelligent and exciting, if rather earnest film". Greene praises Bogart's acting and comments that the film's intelligence comes from the director's attention to the moments of horror. Frank S. Nugent of The New York Times praised the film's direction, writing, performances, and strong themes; calling it "editorial cinema at its best". Dennis Schwartz from Ozus' World Movie Reviews awarded the film a grade B−, calling it "A gripping social drama based on the newspaper headlines of the day". TV Guide gave the film 3 out of 5 stars, calling it "A grim, often brutal film", while criticizing Bogart's performance as being unsympathetic and Sheridan's role as "thankless".

== Awards and honors ==
Robert Lord's original screenplay received an Academy Award nomination in 1937, but lost to William Wellman and Robert Carson's work for A Star Is Born. The National Board of Review named Black Legion as one of the ten best films of 1937, and Humphrey Bogart as one of the best actors of the year for his work in the film. It was one of a series of anti-fascist films in this period that addressed the dangers to society from groups that opposed immigrants (especially Catholics and Jews), Asians, and blacks, showing that fascism and racism resulted in similar "crimes against humanity."
