= Little Men (1998 film) =

1998 film

- Directed by: Rodney Gibbons
- Screenplay by: Mark Evan Schwartz
- Based on: Little Men; 1871 novel by Louisa May Alcott
- Produced by: Franco Battista; Pierre David
- Starring: Mariel Hemingway; Chris Sarandon
- Narrated by: Kathleen Fee
- Cinematography: Georges Archambault
- Edited by: André Corriveau
- Music by: Milan Kymlicka
- Production companies: Brainstorm Media; Image Organization; Allegro Films
- Distributed by: Legacy Releasing (Canada); Warner Bros. (United States)
- Release date: May 8, 1998
- Running time: 98 minutes
- Country: Canada
- Language: English

Little Men is a 1998 Canadian family drama film starring Mariel Hemingway and Chris Sarandon. It is based on the 1871 novel of the same name written by Louisa May Alcott, the author of Little Women. It is a loose sequel to Little Women (1994).

== Plot ==
In 1871, John Brooke meets a homeless youth named Nat Blake in Boston. He sends him to his sister-in-law, Jo Bhaer, who runs Plumfield School for Boys with her husband Fritz. Later Nat's friend Dan comes to Plumfield. Jo and Fritz allow him to stay, though he soon proves to be a troublemaker.

== Cast ==
- Mariel Hemingway as Josephine "Jo" Bhaer
- Michael Caloz as Nat Blake
- Ben Cook as Dan
- Chris Sarandon as Fritz Bhaer
- Michael Yarmush as Emil
- Ricky Mabe as Tommy Bangs
- Gabrielle Boni as Nan Harding
- Julia Garland as Daisy Brooke
- B.J. McLellan as Jack Ford
- Tyler Hynes as Demi Brooke
- Kathleen Fee as the Narrator and Molly
- Mickey Toft as Teddy Bhaer

== Reception ==
Roger Ebert gave the film one and a half stars. Leonard Maltin gave it two and a half stars.

== Home media release ==
On July 28, 1998, Warner Home Video and Warner Bros. Family Entertainment released the film on VHS; as part of the year-long catalog promotion, the Warner Bros. 75th Anniversary Celebration. Then on September 28, 1999, it was re-released as part of Warner's second promotion, the Century Collection.

=== Catalog Promotions ===
- Warner Bros. 75th Anniversary Celebration (1998)
- Century Collection (1999)
- Century 2000 (2000)
- Warner Spotlight (2001)
