= Little Men (1934 film) =

1934 film by Phil Rosen

- Theatrical release poster
- Directed by: Phil Rosen
- Written by: Gertrude Orr; Ken Goldsmith
- Based on: Little Men; 1871 novel by Louisa May Alcott
- Produced by: Nat Levine
- Starring: Ralph Morgan; Erin O'Brien-Moore
- Cinematography: Ernest Miller; William Nobles
- Edited by: Joseph Kane
- Music by: Hugo Riesenfeld
- Distributed by: Mascot Pictures
- Release date: December 14, 1934
- Running time: 77 minutes
- Country: United States
- Language: English

Little Men is a 1934 American feature film based on Louisa May Alcott's 1871 novel Little Men, starring Ralph Morgan and Erin O'Brien-Moore, directed by Phil Rosen, and was released by Mascot Pictures.

== Plot ==
The former Jo March (O'Brien-Moore), now married to Prof. Bhaer (Morgan), opens a boarding school for wayward boys. One day, a boy by the name of Nat Blake arrives at the house and is taken in by the Bhaers. Nat is soft-spoken, compassionate, respectful, and bright. He is picked on by the kids at first but soon fits right in. One day while riding back from a birthday party, Nat sees one of his homeless friends, Dan. He invites Dan back to the house, assuming that the Bhaers can take him in as they did himself. Although Professor Bhaer is hesitant due to the fact that Dan is older than all of the other boys in the house, Jo refuses to let Dan continue to live on the streets and insists that he stay. Dan, unlike Nat, is rude, arrogant, careless, and selfish. He quickly earns a bad name for himself by lying, getting into fights, smoking, and starting fires.

The boys in the house begin to resent Dan, but the Bhaers keep giving him second chances, knowing that deep down he has a good heart. One day, a dollar gets stolen from a boy named Tommy. Even though Dan is the trouble maker, everyone thinks it’s Nat, because he lied in the past about another incident. Some of the boys try to bully Nat into confessing, and Dan acts as Nat’s bodyguard due to their close friendship. In order to prevent Nat from further pestering, Dan goes to the streets to sell newspapers and get Tommy’s dollar back. When Dan tries to return the money anonymously, he is caught and thought to be the thief.

Professor Bhaur sends Dan to a much stricter alternative orphanage. Dan ends up escaping shortly after arriving and goes missing. Meanwhile at Plumfield, a boy, Dick, gets extremely sick and dies. The orphanage comes together in mourning and a note is left by a boy named Jack saying that he stole Tommy’s dollar and he’s never coming back. Realizing that he made a mistake, Professor Bhaer tries to bring Dan back, but he is nowhere to be found. The boys realize how much they miss Dan, and how he made their lives fun and exciting. After a couple of weeks, Dan returns to Plumfield and everyone is united and happy once again.

== Cast ==
- Ralph Morgan as Prof. Bhaer
- Erin O'Brien-Moore as Jo March Bhaer
- Junior Durkin as Franz
- Cora Sue Collins as Daisy
- Phyllis Fraser as Mary Anne
- Frankie Darro as Dan
- David Durand as Nat Blake
- Dickie Moore as Demi
- Tad Alexander as Jack
- Buster Phelps as Dick
- Ronnie Cosby as Rob Bhaer
- Tommy Bupp as Tommy Bangs
- Bobby Cox as Stuffy
- Dickie Jones as Dolly
- Richard Quine as Ned
- Donald Buck as Billy
- Eddie Dale Heiden as Teddy Bhaer
- George Ernest as Emil
- Irving Bacon as Silas (uncredited)
- Hattie McDaniel as Asia (uncredited)
- Gustav von Seyffertitz as Schoolmaster Page (uncredited)

== Reception ==
Little Men received favorable reviews. One industry publication described it as being a "well made, well produced version of Louisa M. Alcott’s famous classic." The film was praised for its child actors. The Film Daily called it the biggest cast of juvenile actors assembled in a feature which included names like Frankie Darro, Junior Durkin, and David Durand.
