= Little Men (1940 film) =

1940 film by Norman Z. McLeod

- 1940 Theatrical Poster
- Directed by: Norman Z. McLeod
- Written by: Mark Kelly; Arthur Caesar; Jack Wagner
- Based on: Little Men; 1871 novel by Louisa May Alcott
- Produced by: C. Graham Baker; Donald J. Ehlers; Gene Towne
- Starring: Kay Francis; Jack Oakie; George Bancroft
- Cinematography: Nicholas Musuraca
- Edited by: George Hively
- Music by: Roy Webb
- Production company: RKO Radio Pictures
- Distributed by: RKO Radio Pictures
- Release date: December 7, 1940
- Running time: 84 minutes
- Country: United States
- Language: English

Little Men (1940) is an American comedy-drama film based on the novel Little Men (1871) by Louisa May Alcott. Norman Z. McLeod directed the film.

== Plot ==
During the late 1860s con artist Major Burdle is placing newspaper ads selling a framed engraved portrait of George Washington for a dollar. Customers receive a three-cent Washington postage stamp stuck in the middle of a piece of paper with a frame border. A crook named Willie the Fox comes and tells him their friend Lefty died and wanted Burdle to raise his infant son, whose mother is also dead. Burdle names the boy Dan, and raises him as his own son. Major Burdle earns money doing what he considers honest work – selling a fake cure for drunkenness. Burdle and Dan go across the United States selling the bottled so-called remedy at medicine shows.

In 1880 local officials insist Dan must attend school, and recommends he be enrolled at Plumfield, a rural boarding school that is located on a farm. Burdle agrees to take Dan to Plumfield, and tells him he will grow to like it there.

Plumfield is run by Josephine Bhaer (known as Jo or Aunt Jo) and her husband Professor Bhaer, who was born and raised in Switzerland. Most of their students are boys, but they are also teaching Jo’s tomboy niece Nan, plus two other girls to give Nan female friends. They had been leasing Plumfield, but received a letter stating they will need to vacate the property when their lease ends, unless they can pay $5,000 to purchase the farm. The Bhaers have saved $2,500 and Professor Bhaer wants to take the money and invest it in order to obtain the needed amount.

Willie the Fox comes to see Major Burdle. Willie had served 12 years of a 14-year prison term for bank robbery, but escaped, and caused the prison authorities to believe he had drowned. Willie brought along a poster stating there was a $5,000 reward for his capture. He was keeping the poster because it had a good picture of him on it. Willie decides to tag along when Burdle and Dan go to Plumfield.

Burdle tells the Bhaers that he travels around the country for his work, and claims that he makes investments. Professor Bhaer gives him the couple’s $2,500 and asks him to invest it so that the money will double in value. Burdle takes the money, but then decides he’d done wrong, and tells Willie he will place the money in his bank, and then send a $2,500 check to the Bhaers.

At first Dan hates it at Plumfield, where he not only has to do schoolwork, but is assigned farming chores, including milking the school’s beloved milk cow, Buttercup. Dan likes to smoke, play poker, and sing songs about drinking. Tomboy Nan takes an interest in Dan, but the other students, including an older student named Jack, consider Dan to be a trouble maker.

The Bhaers receive notice that Major Burdle's tuition check has bounced because the account has been closed. Burdle receives notice that his bank has failed, and he has lost all of his money, including the $2,500 he had planned to return to the Bhaers. Major Burdle says he can never return to the school, for he feels it is shameful that his money is gone.

Plumfield will need to close at the end of the month unless a miracle takes place and they can find a way to obtain $5,000. Jo believes Burdle stole their money, but Professor Bhaer believes the man is honest. Their banker has offered to buy Buttercup for $300 and, since they have no other money, they agree to sell their prize-winning milk cow. Jo asks Dan to tie Buttercup and her calf to the back of the banker’s buggy.

Jack tells the other students that he heard Aunt Jo say that the school must close because Dan’s father is a crook that stole money from the Bhaers. Dan declares his father is honest, and the two boys get into a fight. Jack falls and nearly dies from a head injury. A doctor is sent for, and a reporter comes and interview the students. Newspapers across the country carry a front-page story about Major Burdle being a crook, and Dan brutely beating a fellow student.

Burdle and Willie read the story, and Burdle is determined to show Dan he is honest – even if he has to be dishonest to do so. He forges a check for $2,500 and he and Willie return to Plumfield. Burdle gives the money to the Bhaers. A lawman shows up, and Burdle begs everyone to not let Dan know his father will be going to prison. Willie decides to help, so he shows Jo his reward poster, and tells her to turn him in so she will get the $5,000 reward and save the school. The lawman says that if the bank gets their money back Burdle will probably only get a two year prison sentence.

Dan has a short visit with the man he believes is his father. Burdle tells him he will be traveling the country on business for two years, but Dan will stay at Plumfield and get an education. Dan is now happy to stay at the school, and everyone rejoices that Buttercup doesn’t have to be sold. Burdle and Willie go off to prison.

== Cast ==
- Kay Francis as Jo March Bhaer
- Jack Oakie as Willie the Fox
- George Bancroft as Major Burdle
- Jimmy Lydon as Dan
- Ann Gillis as Nan
- Carl Esmond as Professor Bhaer
- Richard Nichols as Teddy
- Francesca Santoro as Bess
- Lillian Randolph as Asia
- Johnny Burke as Silas
- Sammy McKim as Tommy
- Edward Rice as Demi
- Anne Howard as Daisy
- Jimmy Zahner as Jack
- Bobby Cooper as Adolphus
- Schuyler Standish as Nat
- Paul Matthews as Stuffy
- Tony Neil as Ned
- Fred Estes as Emmett
- Douglas Rucker as Billy
- Donald Rackerby as Frank
- William Demarest as Constable Tom Thorpe
- Sterling Holloway as Reporter
- Isabel Jewell as Stella
- Elsie the Cow as Buttercup

Charles Arnt, Stanley Blystone, Nora Cecil, Hal K. Dawson, Sarah Edwards, George D. Green, Jack Henderson, Howard C. Hickman, Lloyd Ingraham, George Irving, William Irving, Bud Jamison, Nella Walker, Clarence Wilson and Duke York appear uncredited.

== Soundtrack ==
During the course of the film short portions of the following songs are sung:

- Lillian Randolph - "Roll, Jordan, Roll" (Traditional Negro spiritual)
- Schuyler Standish - "Jeanie With the Light Brown Hair" (Written by Stephen Foster)
- Lillian Randolph - "Aura Lea" (Music by George R. Poulton, lyrics by W.W. Fosdick)

== Reception ==
The film recorded a loss of $214,000.
