= Ainsworth O'Brien-Moore =

American classical philologist (1897–1936)

Ainsworth O’Brien-Moore (June 7, 1897 – December 31, 1936) was an American classical philologist.

== Biography ==
The brother of actress Erin O'Brien-Moore, Ainsworth O’Brien-Moore attended Harvard School in Los Angeles and studied classics at Princeton University, where he received his bachelor's degree in 1916, his master's degree in 1918 and his Ph.D. in 1922. He worked as instructor in Latin at Princeton and in 1923 at Brown University. From 1925 he was assistant professor of classics at Yale, and was appointed associate professor in 1936.

At age 39, O'Brien-Moore was killed in a car accident near New Haven, Connecticut, in the early morning hours of December 31, 1936. Injured in the crash was his wife, the former Margaret M. O'Donnell, who was driving the car. The couple had a son, Michael.

O'Brien-Moore's scholarship covered different areas of Roman literature and culture. As a graduate student he collaborated with his supervisor David Magie in editing and translating the Scriptores Historiae Augustae for the Loeb Classical Library. His thesis was an examination of the phenomenon of insanity as it was perceived and described by ancient Greek and Roman authors. While being limited to canon authors without taking in account parodistic or medical treatises, his work was an enormous effort and advanced knowledge of this field significantly. In Germany it was praised by the classicist and religious studies scholar Otto Weinreich. As an expert on various aspects of Roman culture, Moore was invited by Wilhelm Kroll to write articles for the internationally renowned Realencyclopädie der Classischen Altertumswissenschaft on the Roman Senate and the Senatus consultum.

He was life member of the American Philological Association (since 1923).

== Select publications ==
- Together with David Magie: Scriptores Historiae Augustae. 3 volumes, Cambridge/London 1921/1924/1932 (Loeb Classical Library)
- Madness in Ancient Literature. Weimar 1924 (Ph.D. thesis, Princeton University)
- Senatus. In: Paulys Realencyclopädie der classischen Altertumswissenschaft (RE). Suppl. VI, Stuttgart 1935, col. 660–800 (translated by Ruth Keimer and Wilhelm Kroll).
- Senatus consultum. In: Paulys Realencyclopädie der classischen Altertumswissenschaft (RE). Suppl. VI, Stuttgart 1935, col. 800–812 (translated by Ruth Keimer and Wilhelm Kroll).
- M. Tullius Cratippus, Priest of Rome. In: Yale Classical Studies. Vol. 8 (1942), p. 23–50
