= Black Legion (political movement) =

American white supremacist terrorist organization

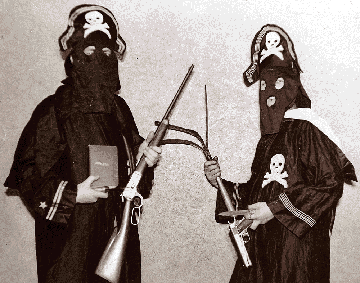
- Black Legion's uniform and weapons, posed by policemen after arrests
- Founder: William Jacob Sheperd
- Leader: Virgil Effinger
- Founded: c. 1925
- Dates active: 1925–1937
- Split from: Ku Klux Klan
- Country: United States
- Headquarters: Detroit, Michigan
- Active regions: Primarily Michigan and Ohio
- Ideology: Americanism; Anti-immigration; Anti-communism; Anti-Catholicism; Antisemitism; Anti-trade unionism; White supremacy
- Political position: Far-right
- Status: Defunct

The Black Legion was a white supremacist organization which began in the Midwestern United States in the 1920s and the 1930s. It split off from the Ku Klux Klan and grew to prominence during the Great Depression. According to historian Rick Perlstein, the FBI estimated that its membership numbered "at 135,000, including a large number of public officials, including Detroit's police chief." Historian Peter H. Amann put the number at between 60,000 and 100,000, while John Earl Haynes said that it had at most only a few hundred members.

The Black Legion is widely viewed as an even more violent and radical offshoot of the Klan. In 1936, the group was suspected of having killed as many as 50 people, including Charles Poole, an organizer for the federal Works Progress Administration. Eleven men were found guilty of Poole's murder. At the time of Poole's murder, the Associated Press described the organization as "a group of loosely federated night-riding bands operating in several States without central discipline or common purpose beyond the enforcement by lash and pistol of individual leaders' notions of 'Americanism'."

Based on testimony which was heard during the trial of Poole's killer, Dayton Dean, Wayne County Prosecutor Duncan McRae conducted a widespread investigation and prosecuted dozens of other Legionnaires suspected of committing murders and assaults. Nearly 50 Legionnaires were convicted of murder, conspiracy to commit murder, kidnapping, arson, and perjury. Additional convictions were obtained against Legionnaires and their sympathizers for contempt of court for refusing to cooperate with the investigation. Within a year, the organization had been crushed. The prosecutions and associated negative publicity resulted in a rapid decline in Legion membership. The sensational cases inspired two related films, one starring Humphrey Bogart, and two radio show episodes which were produced from 1936 to 1938.

A significant public and media controversy occurred when the Black Legion was exposed in 1936, as both FBI Director J. Edgar Hoover and the FBI had known about the group yet failed to intervene.

== Background ==
The Skull and Crossbones insignia of the Black Legion.

In 1915, the release of D. W. Griffith's film, The Birth of a Nation, inspired a revival of the Ku Klux Klan (KKK) in Atlanta, Georgia. Gradually, the new Klan, often appealing to migrants in cities as a fraternal order, established new chapters nationwide, particularly in urban areas, including the rapidly changing cities of the industrialized Midwest. Throughout the 1920s, cities such as Detroit, Cleveland and Indianapolis were centers of an increase in Klan membership and activity in local chapters, in reaction to high rates of immigration from Eastern and Southern Europe, and the internal migration of African Americans from the Southern United States. A sexual scandal in the Ku Klux Klan's national leadership in 1925, and local actions by opponents who were determined to unmask the secrecy of Klan members, caused the Klan's membership to drop rapidly through the late 1920s.

Like the KKK, the Black Legion was largely made up of native-born, working-class, Protestant white men in the Midwest. These men feared the rapid social changes underway and resented competition with immigrants such as Italians and Jews. They also feared migrants in the industrial economy of major cities, such as Detroit. Their list of enemies "included all immigrants, Catholics, Jews and blacks, nontraditional Protestant faiths, labor unions, farm cooperatives and various fraternal groups." Membership was concentrated in Michigan and Ohio.

Black Legion members created a network for jobs and influence. As a secret vigilante group, the Legion members operated in gangs in order to enforce their view of society, sometimes attacking immigrants to intimidate them at work, or to enforce their idea of moral behavior. They generally opposed socialism and union organizing. They had a reputation for frequent violence against alleged enemies, whether political or social. From 1933 to 1936, they were rumored to be responsible for some unsolved deaths that had officially been attributed to suicide or unknown perpetrators.

In 1931, a chapter of the Black Legion was formed in Highland Park, Michigan, by Arthur F. Lupp, Sr. of that community, who styled himself its major general. Throughout and perhaps fueled by the economic and social upheaval of the Great Depression, the Black Legion continued to expand across Michigan until the mid-1930s, when its estimated membership peaked at between 20,000 and 30,000. In general, Black Legion members in the state were native-born Protestant men.

One-third of its members lived in Detroit, which had been a strong center of KKK activity in the 1920s. The Michigan Legion was organized along military lines, with 5 brigades, 16 regiments, 64 battalions, and 256 companies. It boasted of a membership of one million Legionnaires in Michigan, but observers estimated that it had between 20,000 and 30,000 members. One-third of them were located in Detroit, with many living in Highland Park.

== Recruitment ==
The Black Legion's tactics were "to lure potential recruits to a meeting—kidnap them, if necessary—then threaten them if they didn't join and [make them] swear they’d never tell anybody." They would also beat up members if they threatened to quit. The Legion wanted sports figures as members. It was looking into recruiting Mickey Cochrane, player-manager for the Detroit Tigers. He had a nervous breakdown in 1936 and removed himself from the team over Black Legion suspicions. One of these Legion members, Dayton Dean, broke their code and told the authorities of Black Legion's illegal activities. Dayton Dean participated in two of the murders that the Black Legion committed.

== Murder of Charles Poole ==
On May 12, 1936, Charles A. Poole, a federal organizer for the Works Progress Administration, was kidnapped from his home by a gang of Black Legion members. They claimed that Poole, a French Catholic married to a Protestant woman, beat his wife, and that they intended to punish him for this. He was shot and killed that night by Dayton Dean.

Wayne County Prosecutor Duncan McRae, who had been reported by the Detroit Times as a member of the Black Legion, worked to restore his public reputation and vowed to bring the killers of Poole to justice. Authorities arrested and prosecuted a gang of twelve Legionnaires. Dayton Dean pleaded guilty and testified against numerous other members. Ten others were convicted of first degree murder or second degree murder, nine by a jury and one in a bench trial. One man was acquitted.

=== Individual defendants, verdicts, and sentences in Charles Poole murder case ===
Accused	Verdict	Sentence
Dayton Dean	First degree murder	Life imprisonment
"Colonel" Harvey Davis	First degree murder	Life imprisonment
Ervin D. Lee	First degree murder	Life imprisonment
Urban Lipps	First degree murder	Life imprisonment
Paul R. Edwards	First degree murder	Life imprisonment
Edgar Baldwin	First degree murder	Life imprisonment
John Bannerman	First degree murder	Life imprisonment
Lowell Rushing	First degree murder	Life imprisonment
Thomas R. Craig	Second degree murder	10 to 20 years imprisonment
Virgil Morrow	Second degree murder	5 to 15 years imprisonment
Albert Stevens	Second degree murder	7.5 to 15 years imprisonment
John S. Vincent	Second degree murder	3 to 10 years imprisonment

Dean provided considerable testimony to authorities about other activities of the Black Legion. Prejudiced primarily against Catholics, particularly Italian and Slavic immigrants, he and his collaborators had never learned that Becky Poole had a great-grandmother who was African American.

Dayton Dean died in prison on January 18, 1960, at the age of 59. In June 1960, Urban Lipps, another man convicted in the case, had his sentence commuted to 71 years by Governor G. Mennen Williams. Lipps, who was determined to have had the least involvement in the murder, was the first convict to be recommended for clemency. At the time of his release, Lowell Rushing, Paul Edwards, Edgar Baldwin, Ervin Lee, John Bannerman, Harvey Davis, and Charles Rouse were still in prison. Harvey Davis died in the prison in the 1960s.

In 1966, Ervin Lee, now 60, had his sentence commuted by Governor George W. Romney. The commutations were granted with the recommendations of the Michigan Parole Board.

== Prosecutions for earlier murders ==
Dean's testimony and other evidence stimulated investigations by Prosecutor McRae. He gained indictments into a series of other murders and attempted murders in the Detroit area during the previous three years. Nearly 50 Legionnaires were prosecuted for murder, conspiracy to commit murder, kidnapping, arson, and perjury, with prosecutions on contempt of court against Legionnaires and sympathizers who refused to cooperate with the investigation.

The trials revealed the wide network of Black Legion members in local governments, particularly in Highland Park. For instance, member N. Ray Markland had served as mayor of Highland Park. Members included a chief of police and a city councilman in the suburb, and people in civil service jobs. Following the convictions and publicity, membership in the Legion dropped quickly. Its reign of terror ended in the Detroit area.

Among the cases, the prosecutor indicted Black Legion members for the 1935 murder of Silas Coleman of Detroit. The African-American man had been found killed outside Putnam Township, Michigan, on May 26, 1935, nearly a year before Poole's abduction and murder. The ringleader of the murder, Harvey Davis, wanted to see "how it felt to shoot a Negro," according to Dean. Coleman had been abducted, forced to run for his life, and then hunted down and shot. Five men were convicted of first degree murder for killing Coleman and sentenced to life in prison: Harvey Davis, James Roy Lorance, John Bannerman, Ervin D. Lee, and Charles Rouse. Lorance died in prison of tuberculosis on January 3, 1938.

Members were indicted for a 1933 conspiracy to murder Arthur Kingsley, a Highland Park publisher of a community paper, who was a candidate for mayor in 1934. They had planned to shoot him in 1933 because he ran against Markland, a Legionnaire politician. Sixteen Black Legion members were indicted in Kingsley's case, including "two factory policemen, a police officer, and several Highland Park city employees. Nine of them were convicted, and each received sentences of one to five years in prison. At the time of his arrest, Markland was employed as an investigator in the office of Wayne County Prosecutor McRea."

Nine members were convicted in this case, including Markland and Arthur F. Lupp Sr., then a milk inspector for the Detroit Board of Health. Lupp was said to have founded the Legion in Michigan by setting up the chapter in Highland Park. One of the most notable plots of the Legion was a plot by Lupp and Charles McCutcheon, a department bacteriologist, to inject typhoid germs into milk and dairy products distributed through Jewish markets. In the following weeks, Lupp also asked McCutcheon if the germs could be produced in large quantities, put into milk bottles, would flourish in cottage cheese, spread via an infected needle.

Through these cases, authorities learned that Mayor William Voisine of Ecorse, Michigan was identified as a potential target of the Legion. Its members resented his hiring African Americans for city jobs. McRae prosecuted and gained convictions of 37 Legion members on these and related charges, beyond those charged in the Poole case. All received prison terms, markedly reducing the power of the Black Legion in Detroit and Michigan.

Among other murders linked to the Black Legion were two labor organizers, both from eastern Europe:

- George Marchuk, Secretary of the Auto Workers Union in Lincoln Park, was found dead on December 22, 1933, with a bullet in his head.
- John Bielak, an A. F. of L. organizer in the Hudson Motor Car Company plant, who had led a drive for a wage increase, "was found riddled with bullets on March 15, 1934, on a road about ten miles from Monroe, Michigan."

A five-man "arson squad" of the Black Legion confessed to the August 1934 burning of the farm of labor organizer William Mollenhauer, in Oakland County, Michigan, near Pontiac. Members also described numerous plans to disrupt legitimate political meetings and similar activities.

On June 23, 1936, witness Lonnie Holley was sentenced to 30 days in jail for contempt of court after being "insolent" and "untruthful" on the stand.

On December 21, 1936, Isaac "Peg Leg" Stull White, 49, one of the founding members of the Black Legion, died of pneumonia in Maryland. At the time of his death, he'd recently been detained, having fled from an indictment for criminal syndicalism.

Six Legionnaires were convicted of perjury for lying about not being involved in the organization. Walter C. Bair, a former council man was sentenced to 100 days in jail. Robert Grogan, Edgar Cox, Walter Allen, and James Brannon were each sentenced to 60 days in jail. Earl St. John, who was tried separately, was sentenced to 20 months to 15 years in prison. On February 25, 1938, Douglas Gill, a Detroit factory worker and sheriff's deputy, was sentenced to 10 days in jail for contempt of court, after giving false testimony. He was released from jail the following day, after telling the truth in three hours of testimony.

The cases received international media coverage. For instance, the Poole case and the secret Black Legion were reported by The Sydney Morning Herald of Australia on May 25, 1936.

In May 1937, Lupp was sentenced to one to five years in prison for conspiracy to commit murder. He was released on parole in December 1938. Lupp died in obscurity in Indiana on July 24, 1980, at the age of 86.

== Representation in other media ==
Hollywood, radio and, later TV, responded to the lurid nature of the Legion by producing works that referred to it.

- Legion of Terror (1936) starred Ward Bond and Bruce Cabot, and it was based on this group.
- Black Legion (1937), a feature film starring Humphrey Bogart, was based on the events which led to the murder of Charles Poole, but the details of the case and the names of the people who were involved in it were changed in the film. It depicted the devastating effect of domestic terrorist groups like the Black Legion on an ordinary American man, his family, his neighbors, and his coworkers. The National Board of Review named Black Legion the best film of 1937, and it named Humphrey Bogart the best actor for his work on the film.
- True Detective Mysteries, a radio show which was based on the magazine which had the same title, broadcast an episode on April 1, 1937, which directly referred to the Black Legion and Poole's murder.
- The radio show The Shadow, with Orson Welles in the title role, broadcast an episode on March 20, 1938, titled "The White Legion"; the group which was described in the episode was loosely based on the Black Legion.

Since the late 20th century, the group has received renewed historic and popular attention.

- Malcolm X and Alex Haley collaborated on The Autobiography of Malcolm X (1965). Malcolm noted that the Legion had been active in Lansing, Michigan, where his family lived. Malcolm X was six years old when his father died in 1931. He believed that his father was killed by the Black Legion.
- In 1998, the TV series History's Mysteries presented an episode about the group entitled "Terror in the Heartland: The Black Legion".
- Author Tom Stanton's 2016 nonfiction book Terror in the City of Champions details the group's activities.
- The TV series Damnation (2017) features the group.

== See also ==
- Fascism in the United States
