= Little Women II: Jo's Boys =

1993 Japanese animated television series

- Screenshot of the opening logo from Wakakusa Monogatari Nan to Jō Sensei, produced by Nippon Animation
- 若草物語ナンとジョー先生
- Genre: Drama, adventure, slice of life, coming-of-age story, comedy drama, family, historical fiction
- Based on: Little Men by Louisa May Alcott
- Screenplay by: Michiru Shimada
- Directed by: Kōzō Kusuba
- Music by: David Siebels
- Country of origin: Japan
- Original language: Japanese
- No. of episodes: 40

Production
- Executive producer: Koichi Motohashi
- Producers: Yoshihiro Suzuki (Fuji TV); Junzō Nakajima
- Production companies: Fuji Television; Nippon Animation

Original release
- Network: FNS (Fuji TV)
- Release: January 17 – December 19, 1993

Little Women II: Jo's Boys, also known as Wakakusa Monogatari Nan to Jō Sensei (若草物語ナンとジョー先生; "Tale of Young Grass: Nan and Miss Jo") is a 1993 Japanese animated television series based on Louisa May Alcott's Little Men, produced by Nippon Animation. The title is taken from Jo's Boys, the title of the sequel to Little Men, on which the series is also partially based.

The series is the sequel to the studio's 1987 Tales of Little Women, an adaptation of Alcott's novel of the same name.

== Plot ==
Josephine March has reached adulthood ten years after the events of Tales of Little Women and is married to Friedrich Bhaer, a German professor. In the Plumfield farmhouse left to her by Aunt March, Jo Bhaer established a school for her two sons, Robby and Teddy, her nephews (Franz, Emil, Demi-John), her niece (Daisy), and a group of children, including Annie "Nan" Harding and Dan, an adolescent from the streets. Jo and her husband oversee the pupils' education, incorporating song, music, and play as the children navigate work, play, discipline, and daily activities.

== Cast and characters ==
The original voice cast is:

Bhaer family

- Annie "Nan" Harding (voiced by Hazuru Matsukura): The main character of this anime.
- Josephine "Jo" Bhaer (née March) (voiced by Eiko Yamada): Second main character of this anime.
- Fritz Bhaer (voiced by Yōsuke Akimoto): Jo's husband.
- Robin "Rob" Bhaer (voiced by Yuriko Fuchizaki): Jo and Friedrich's five-year-old son.
- Theodore "Teddy" Bhaer (voiced by Kyōko Minaimi): Jo and Friedrich's three-year-old son.

Brooke family

- Margaret "Meg" Brooke (née March) (voiced by Keiko Han): Jo's eldest sister, John Brooke's wife, and Daisy and Demi's mother.
- John Brooke (voiced by Toshihiko Kojima): Meg's husband and Laurie's former teacher, he dies in the story.
- Margaret "Daisy" Brooke: John and Meg's daughter, and Demi's twin sister.
- John "Demi" Brooke (voiced by Kyoko Yamada): John and Meg's son, and Daisy's twin brother.
- Josephine "Josie" Brooke: John and Meg Brooke's two-year-old daughter, Jo and Friedrich's niece, and Daisy and Demi's sister.

Laurence family

- Amy Curtis Laurence (née March): Amy attends the funeral of Meg's husband, John.
- Theodore "Laurie/Teddy" Laurence (voiced by Nobuo Tobita): Amy's husband and good friend of Jo.

Others

- Jack Ford (voiced by Tsutomu Kashiwakura): A boy who stole Tommy's money and ran away, leaving a letter confessing of his crime.
- Franz Hoffman: One of Fritz's nephews.
- Emil Hoffman: Franz's fourteen-year-old brother.
- George "Stuffy" Cole: An overweight boy.
- Daniel "Dan" Kean (voiced by Nobutoshi Hayashi): A rebellious friend of Nat.
- Mary-Ann (voiced by Kayoko Fujii)
- Tommy Bangs (voiced by Minami Takayama)
- Nat Blake (voiced by Mariko Ikegami): A boy who is a violinist.

== Broadcast ==
Jo's Boys aired on Fuji Television on Sundays from 17 January to 19 December 1993 as part of Nippon Animation's World Masterpiece Theater.

== International titles ==
- Mulherzinhas II (Portuguese)
- Los chicos de Jo (Spanish)
- Missis Jo und ihre fröhliche Familie (German)
- Petite bonne femme (French)
- Una classe di monelli per Jo (Italian)
- Wakakusa Monogatari Nan to Jou Sensei (若草物語 ナンとジョー先生) (Japanese)
- Маленькие женщины (Russian)
- نوار (Arabic, First dub)
- جنى (Arabic, Second dub)
- 新小婦人 (Chinese (Taiwan))

== Music ==
The opening theme ("Ashita mo otenki") is performed by Akiko Kosaka.

== Episode list and original air dates in 1993 ==
The original broadcast list of episodes is:

1. Welcome to Plumfield (January 17): Annie Harding, nicknamed Nan, comes back after 10 years, at the age of 21 to Plumfield, a residential school for orphaned boy and girls where she spent her formative years. Then she starts bemusing about her time there 10 years ago. She starts from the very first time she arrived at the train station in Concorde. The train arrived early and seeing no one receiving her, she started to Plumfield on her own. There she got roguish welcome from peter, ned, jack, stuffy and the others. But played it back against them on their terms. Mrs. Jo Bhaer coming back, finds her in that state and becomes impressed. She proclaims to her soon she will be taking amusing tasks as punishments.
2. Rivers and fields are the best classrooms! (January 24): For the ruckus of the previous day, Nan has been punished to teach for the afternoon lesson. After much pondering, she decides, that she will turn her proper introduction into a lesson plan. The plan goes smoothly and the lesson was delivered with amp passion.
3. Picking strawberries and the dark forest (January 31): Nan and rob have gone lost while picking strawberries with the others. They went out of bounds to get more and couldn't find their way back when it started raining. Then they took refuge in a small cave. Nan went out of the cave to get rob's strawberry bucket, but then when she got back with the bucket, she saw there was no rob. So, she in the rain went out again in the dark forest, while Mrs. Bhaer and the others are also looking frantically for both of them.
4. The appointed box (February 7): After both of them are found by Mama Jo, Nan is punished for her rule breaking and putting lil' rob in danger. She is instructed to stay in a room all by herself for an entire day. At the close of the day, Mama Jo enters the room and tells her if she again finds the will to rebel, she better put that will in this make-believe box; thus settling that feeling.
5. The violinist's performance (February 14): Nat arrives through the recommendation of Teddy, who is known by Uncle Lawrence to the kids. The kids, Mr. and Mrs. Bhaer all accept him and by evening they all charmed by nat's fiddling skills.
6. Tommy Bang's business (February 21): The next day, nat is introduced to farming and pet-keeping. Tommy gives him a small share in chicken egg business, so he can buy a pet. Then after nat runs away, after being ashamed that he can't read numbers or letters, Mr. Bhaer encourages him and cheers him up by giving him a plot of land to cultivate.
7. I am Robinson Crusoe (February 28):
8. First time making pumpkin pies (March 7):
9. Gift for the toy king (March 14):
10. The big war in pajamas (March 21):
11. The rotten youth from town Dan (April 18):
12. Plumfield's thunderstorm (April 25):
13. Duel! Emil got angry (May 2):
14. Dan and Teddy's secret (May 9):
15. Buttercup's mayhem (May 23):
16. The school's on fire! (May 30):
17. So long, Dan! (June 6):
18. Mother's here (June 13):
19. Welcome to the dance (June 20):
20. If we grow up what shall we be? (June 27):
21. Please hit the teacher! (July 11):
22. Letter from Mr. Page (August 1):
23. The abandoned flower garden (August 8)
24. Afraid to freely speak (August 15)
25. Establishing a museum (August 22)
26. I am not the thief! (August 29)
27. Broken friendships (September 5)
28. Words of explanation (September 12)
29. Won't lose to a boy! (September 19)
30. Clock sounds of a little wedding (September 26)
31. Best way to use five dollars (October 17)
32. I want to be a doctor! (October 24)
33. Regarding father's decision (October 31)
34. The ambassador on a snowy day (November 7)
35. In the middle of a blizzard (November 14)
36. Dan searches for a strong horse (November 21)
37. Premonitions of going on a journey (November 28)
38. Everybody's decisions (December 5)
39. Naughty Jo riding a bicycle (December 12)
40. Goodbye, Plumfield! (December 19)

== Reception ==
The series received generally positive reception, and it was described as "beautiful" and "thought-provoking", with a story that can appeal to both younger and older audiences. The French website Planet Jeunesse gave a positive review, mainly commending its fidelity to the source material and the focus on the main character Nan.
