= Jo's Boys =

1886 novel by Louisa May Alcott

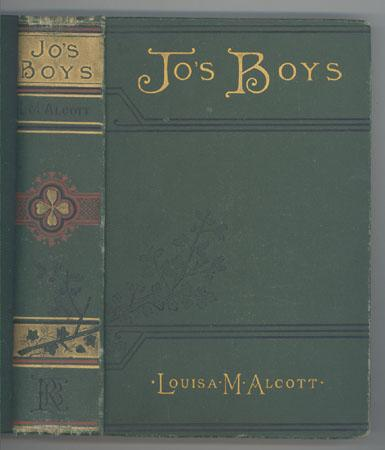
- Cover and spine, 1887 edition
- Author: Louisa May Alcott
- Language: English
- Series: Little Women
- Genre: Children's literature
- Publisher: Roberts Brothers
- Publication date: 1886
- Publication place: United States of America
- Media type: Print
- Pages: 375 (First edition)
- Preceded by: Little Men

Jo's Boys, and How They Turned Out: A Sequel to "Little Men" is a novel by American author Louisa May Alcott, first published in 1886. The novel is the final book in the unofficial Little Women series. In it, the March sisters' children and the original students of Plumfield, now grown, are caught up in real world troubles as they work towards careers and pursue love.

Jo's Boys was written between 1882 and 1886 as Alcott dealt with chronic illness. The book explores themes relating to modern ideals regarding gender roles and vocation, as well as progressive reform in education and women's right to vote. The characters Dan and Nan are examples of the opportunities open to people unattached in society.

Critics credited Jo's Boys with Alcott's normal charm and humor, noting its values and progressive ideas along with the return of past loved characters, although some called the book a lesser counterpart to Alcott's other books.

== Plot ==
The book describes life at Plumfield, where Jo and Professor Bhaer continue to run an academy ten years after Little Men. The story also explores the lives of many past Plumfield residents. Tom, one of the original students, is so in love with another Plumfield student, Nan, that he has enrolled in medical school to follow her despite having no personal interest in medicine. Nan is clear that she wants to stay single and focus on her career.

Jo has earned plenty of money and notoriety publishing her stories, but is tired of the constant visits and letters from fans who expect someone different than she is. After an exasperating surprise visit from a group of fans, Dan, another original Plumfield student shows up on a visit from California. Those at Plumfield are fascinated by his wild personality and rugged good looks. A dance is held at Parnassus, the home of Amy and Laurie's family, before Dan goes off to try farming and Professor Bhaer's adopted son Emil goes back to sea.

The Lawrences then take Meg's youngest daughter Josie along on a vacation at the beach, where she discovers her idol Miss Cameron is staying next door. After biding her time, Josie earns an invitation to visit and receives advice from the actress. Back at Plumfield, Tom confides in Mrs. Jo that in his efforts to impress Nan, he "accidentally" proposed to a girl named Dora, but he finds he is happier with her and quits medicine to join his family's business. Meanwhile, Demi shares with his mother, Meg, that after trying so many professions, he wants to go into publishing.

The story jumps to Emil, who is promoted after his hard work as a sailor. On his first voyage as second mate, he gets a chance to show his true strength when the ship sinks and the captain becomes badly injured. He later marries the captain's daughter. In Dan's travels out west, he ends up killing a man in self-defense, which is the one sin he and Jo always feared he would commit. He is sentenced to a year in prison with hard labor and avoids telling anyone out of shame, only sending short postcards home. After his release, he resolves to do something worthy of pride before revisiting Plumfield.

Nat, yet another of the original students, begins a musical career in Europe, nearly goes into debt, and refocuses on his studies, largely due to his love for his childhood sweetheart Daisy Brooke and his desire to provide for and create a home for her, despite her mother Meg's opposition to their marriage. Back at Plumfield, Jo produces a play focusing on a mother as the hero of the story. Another production poses the residents of Plumfield as classic gods and goddesses in several tableaux. After Laurie's comments on Jo as Juno, she resolves to be a better wife to Professor Bhaer. Miss Cameron attends the event and compliments Josie's acting. Later, at the March sisters' sewing circle, they and the female students discuss their futures and the expanding opportunities for single women. At Class Day, Demi and Josie conspire to find out whether Alice Heath has feelings for Demi, and they settle on sending her three roses in various levels of bloom and asking her to wear one according to her feelings. Alice decides to wear all three, confirming their engagement. The news of Demi's engagement softens Meg's heart, and she tells her daughter Daisy that when Nat returns, they can be together.

News of Dan's injury, obtained while saving men from a mining accident, comes by newspaper. Laurie brings him back to Plumfield for recovery, after which Josie and Bess, Amy's young daughter, try to keep him entertained. Jo discovers Dan is in love with Bess and gently advises him not to act on it. Nat returns from Germany, and Meg officially approves his and Daisy's marriage. The book ends by summarizing that all the marriages go well, and Bess and Josie find success in the arts. Nan remains happily single and dedicated to her work, and Dan dies defending the Native Americans he lives among. Demi finds success in publishing, and Jo's son Ted becomes a clergyman. Alcott writes that this is the end of the March family's story.

== Themes ==
=== Freedom ===
Miss Cameron, Dan, and Nan exemplify the freedom of unattachment in modern society. Dan, one of the most developed characters in the book, portrays an "untamed" hero figure. Free to do whatever he wants, he becomes both a savior and a murderer, the most attractive character at Plumfield, yet unworthy of marriage despite his love of Bess and imagining himself as her knight. His wandering, free lifestyle fails to keep him free of confinement and worthy of someone like Bess, instead leading to a lonely life and an early death. He exemplifies the hopelessness of satisfying all of one's personal desires.

Single women and men also demonstrate a type of freedom in which they can achieve a different kind of success. Nan can focus completely on her work and Dan, despite his loneliness, is able to find his own peace. The book's narration generally minimizes marriage, not as a negative event, but as a side story to the characters exploring careers and retaining independence.

=== Modern ideals ===
Although Alcott is more critical about progressive education and modern literature in other works such as A Garland for Girls, Plumfield represents her idea of utopia as a school, home, and charity. The school teaches the March family's children, but also sponsors local boys and orphans. The nearby Laurence College is described as a coeducational school with progressive politics and "new ideas of education", allowing students of any sex and color.

Other more modern ideas such as dieting and temperance appear in Jo's Boys. Jo suggests root-beer instead of alcohol to some of the boys, lecturing them on health. Dan's exploration of the west presents similar stories to the dime novels of the day. Celebrity culture also began to emerge, showing up in the book as Miss Cameron. Faster photography allowed for amateurs, like Demi, to try their hand at the art. Throughout the novel, Alcott contrasts new and old, modern and old-fashioned.

==== Gender roles ====
Critics disagree on whether Plumfield is a "feminist utopia" or whether Alcott is more focused on addressing social constraints placed on women of the time. Women's expanding rights to work, receive an education, and live independent of a husband or family show up in the paths of the different female characters in the novel. Nan chooses her career over ever having a family and Daisy focuses mainly on having a family. Alice and Jo work on balancing both career and family, and Josie and Bess are said to have successful careers and "worthy mates". The novel also discusses women's responsibility to employ their right to vote. Jo encourages the female students of Laurence College to consider what they will do with their lives if they never marry. The ensuing conversation explores the idea that the role of women in society is decreasingly based on rank and more based on skill. Jo also shares her conviction that women diagnosed with "nervous exhaustion" or a "delicate constitution" can be cured by studying and putting their mind to work.

The feminism in the novel is contrasted with the plays put on by Jo and Laurie at Plumfield in which motherhood is the focus and interests diverging from domestic ideals are discouraged. Additionally, Jo's achievement of her childhood dreams of money and fame contrasts with her settling as the matron of Plumfield and its students. Amy is said to have succeeded where Jo hasn't in combining her familial and artistic efforts, suggesting to the reader that women can have a family without giving up the development of their talents. Alcott also develops the importance of the mother's moral guidance on their sons, emphasizing that only women can balance men's impulses.

==== Vocation ====
Jo's Boys goes in depth into different characters' attempts to find the right direction in life. Both Dan and Demi try multiple different careers throughout the story before ending up somewhere they feel content. Other characters pursue careers in law, business, art, acting, music, medicine, religion, and education. Tom's story emphasizes finding a career one is "well-suited" for. Both Demi and Tom only find their professions after considering marriage, finding more thought-out career paths with the stability to support a family.

=== Classic mythology ===
Continuing the contrast of modern versus old-fashioned, Alcott frequently alludes to Greek and Roman mythology. Ted is often directly compared to Mercury. Dan notices a "gleaming and white" statue of the beautiful Galatea just as Bess is frequently described as fair and white. Analyzing "modernity" in Jo's Boys, Gregory Eiselein writes that these allusions serve to emphasize the present rather than romanticize the past. Alcott puts a modern twist on the story of Galatea and Pygmalion, whose statue comes to life in answer to his prayers. Rather than fulfilling Dan's desire for Bess, Alcott turns the story towards denial to protect innocence. "The Owlsdark Marbles", the series of tableaux put on at Plumfield, is another direct use of mythology to comment on society. Bacchus becomes the subject of a lecture on temperance and Minerva holds a shield for "Woman's Rights" and advertises the duty of women to "vote early and often".

=== Author-audience separation ===
Alcott's treatment of Jo's fame establishes separation between an author and their audience. Jo's readers imagine they know her from her writing and Jo expresses frustration that they have no personal knowledge of her and want to connect with an ideal. More so in Jo's Boys than in some of her other pieces commenting on the author-audience relationship, Alcott points out a divide between Jo's imagined audience and the readers' engagement with her books. Alienation emerges when fans are disappointed about their interactions and Jo comes to resent them.

== Background and publication history ==
Despite dealing with chronic illness, Louisa May Alcott began work on Jo's Boys in 1882 while living at the Thoreau-Alcott House on Main Street in Concord, Massachusetts She took a break from writing in the middle of her work due to vertigo, and she later worried the book was not well written because of how long it took her to complete it. Her father, Bronson Alcott, worked in education and participated in establishing a utopian community in Massachusetts, which may have contributed to the exploration of progressive education in Jo's Boys. In 1885, Alcott moved to 10 Louisburg Square in Boston, Massachusetts and finished writing Jo's Boys by June 1886. The first edition was released in October of that year. In the preface, Alcott wrote an apology for the "unevenness" of the writing and explained that she wrote little of Amy because "the original of that character died" and Alcott found it difficult to write about her. It had one illustration of a bust of Alcott in the front and lacked other illustrations because she suggested the boys were grown and the book was not for children. As of 1990, the Harvard Library Bulletin reported that the book had 54 printings and 221,439 copies printed.

== Reception ==
Jo's Boys received mostly positive reviews, although some critics included negative remarks. Lippincott's Monthly Magazine called the first edition of Jo's Boys "bright and wholesome and cheery". Boston Daily Advertiser, Boston Evening Transcript, and Templeton Hartford Daily Courant all said the book lived up to the charms and values of Alcott's past books. Several reviewers commented that the book was more serious than others Alcott wrote, although it retained her humor. The Academy called it "the last and not the best" in the series, and the Graphic commented readers would love it because of the old books, but that it was "a trifle laboured and tedious". Others praised the modern ideals presented in the story. The Overland Monthly mentioned Alcott's "sensible contention for co-education, and for freedom for women" in the book. A few reviews commented that Alcott's writing lacked style and that the storyline was "haphazard". New York Tribune suggested Alcott succeeded in teaching through her story, but that "the women's hand shows ... in the priggishness and sentimentality of some of the 'Boys'".

Many reviewers commented on the chapter "Jo's Last Scrape". Boston Daily Advertiser said the chapter could have been better published elsewhere as to avoid interrupting the story. Boston Courier wrote that the chapter would spark the interest of readers interested in the author's own life and The New York Times labelled "Jo's Last Scrape" a "charming bit" of Alcott's experiences included in the book. New York Tribune called Jo "the sunshine of the book".

=== Illustrations ===
Later editions incorporated illustrations and received mixed reviews. An edition released in 1925 included eight watercolors by Clara M. Burd, however in Judith C. Ullom's annotated bibliography of Alcott's works, she remarked the watercolors had an "atmosphere of artificiality" and looked "dated". A later edition with illustrations by Louis Jambor was released in 1949, but this time the art was called "luminous", "lively", and "strong in human interest". A 1957 edition had both watercolors with "cheerful colors" and drawings with "charm and humor". Kirkus Reviews said of the same edition that Grace Paull's color illustrations "are not worthy of the text".

== Adaptation ==
Nan is the focus of Japanese animated television series Little Women II: Jo's Boys (Wakakusa Monogatari Nan to Jou Sensei).
