= Virgil Effinger =

American Ku Klux Klan member (1873–1955)

- Born: Virgil Herbert Effinger; August 7, 1873; Newark, Ohio, U.S.
- Died: October 15, 1955 (aged 82); Toledo, Ohio, U.S.

Virgil Herbert "Bert" Effinger (August 7, 1873 – October 15, 1955) was an American Ku Klux Klan renegade member who became the self-proclaimed leader of the Black Legion in the United States, active mostly in Ohio and Michigan. The secret, white vigilante group was made up of native-born Protestant men, many from the South, who felt threatened by immigration and contemporary industrial society during the struggles of the Great Depression. One-third of the members in Michigan lived in Detroit. Effinger advocated a fascist revolution in the US with himself as dictator.

The Black Legion was rumored in the mid-1930s in the Detroit area to be responsible for numerous murders and attacks on persons and property. It was exposed by prosecution in Wayne County, Michigan for the 1936 kidnapping and murder of Charles Poole, a French-Canadian Catholic organizer for the federal Works Progress Administration. Eleven members were convicted of murder and sentenced to life in prison. In related prosecutions after additional investigation, dozens of other members of the Black Legion were convicted of other crimes, and all received prison sentences. Group membership withered under the spotlight and scandals. In 1938 Effinger tried to found a new group but was unsuccessful. He died nearly two decades later in a psychiatric hospital, having always denied membership in the Legion.

== Early life ==
Born in Newark, Ohio, Effinger served with the United States Army during the Spanish–American War. Settling in Lima, Ohio after his military service, Effinger worked as a salesman in the town. A strong racist, anti-Semite and anti-Catholic, he joined the Ku Klux Klan and attained the rank of Grand Titan within the movement.

After national scandals in 1925 and growing local political opposition in many areas, the KKK declined in influence in the Midwest and nationally. By that time in eastern Ohio, a paramilitary group known as the Black Guards (later the Black Legion) had been formed to provide security for KKK officers.

== Black Legion ==
Effinger took control in 1931 of the Black Legion; he believed it could be the basis for a network of revolutionary cells. He supported expansion by a military structure of brigades, battalions, etc. and soon advocated a revolution, intending for the Legion to seize power in Washington D.C. and install him as dictator. Effinger described his movement as "a guerrilla army designed to fight the Republican and Democratic parties". He rewrote history, claiming that the Legion dated to the revolutionary-era Boston Tea Party, rather than the 1920s.

Under Effinger's vision, the Legion expanded in Ohio and Michigan during the early 1930s of the Great Depression, where a chapter was first founded by Arthur Lupp in Highland Park in 1931. Its membership was similar to those previously attracted to the KKK: white Protestant native-born men, many from the South, who were threatened by immigration and other changes in society; many lacked skills for the industrial jobs of major cities. While Effinger claimed leadership, the chapters were highly independent.

The Black Legion members had a long list of enemies: immigrants, Catholics, Jews, blacks, labor organizers, communists, and socialists. The Black Legion was linked in Michigan especially to a handful of racist and political murders as well as attempts to appeal to a wider base of the community by arson and bomb attacks on communist bookshops and labor organizers.

The Black Legion expanded even more in Michigan than Ohio, reaching an estimated membership of 20,000 to 30,000 in the mid-1930s, with one third based in Detroit. They were later found to have been particularly influential in Highland Park, Michigan, with a mayor, chief of police, and city councilman as members, among many others. Their network helped members get jobs and exert political influence.

In May 1936 Charles Poole, a Catholic Works Progress Administration organizer, was shot and killed in southwest Detroit, Michigan by Legion member Major Dayton Dean after being kidnapped by him and a gang of followers. While crimes against non-whites or communists were often ignored by small-town police at the time, offenses for religious affiliation tended to be taken more seriously. Poole's killers were vigorously pursued by Detroit city police and the Wayne County Prosecutor's office.

Dean pleaded guilty and testified against other members of his gang and the Legion; he and ten others were sentenced to life in prison. Investigations resulting from his testimony and public outrage about the group led to convictions of dozens of other members for crimes ranging from attempted murder to other murders; they all received prison sentences. With so many leaders jailed, the Black Legion collapsed.

== Later years ==
In 1938, Effinger attempted to organize a successor movement, the Patriotic Legion of America, this time admitting Catholics. This organization was to be located in San Antonio, Texas. The Patriotic Legion of America was brought to the attention of the FBI after a printer in San Antonio forwarded a charter document to the Bureau. The new group failed, and Effinger disappeared into obscurity. In 1940, Effinger was found guilty of contempt of court for his behavior at a libel trial against The Lima News. In an affidavit which was part of his request for a new trial, he'd falsely accused the judge of losing his temper and trying to strike him with the gavel. Effinger was sentenced to two months in jail and fined $200. He died in a psychiatric hospital in Toledo, Ohio in 1955, having always denied any involvement in the Black Legion. He had no criminal record.
