= His Greatest Gamble =

1934 film directed by John S. Robertson

- Directed by: John Robertson; Charles Kerr (assistant)
- Screenplay by: Sidney Buchman; Harry Hervey
- Story by: Salisbury Field
- Produced by: Pandro S. Berman; Myles Connolly
- Starring: Richard Dix; Dorothy Wilson; Bruce Cabot; Erin O'Brien-Moore
- Cinematography: Teddy Tetzlaff
- Edited by: William Hamilton
- Music by: Max Steiner
- Production company: RKO Radio Pictures
- Release dates: July 17, 1934 (Premiere-New York City); August 10, 1934 (US)
- Running time: 72 minutes
- Country: United States
- Language: English

His Greatest Gamble is a 1934 American drama film directed by John Robertson from a screenplay by Sidney Buchman and Harry Hervey, based on a story by Salisbury Field. The film stars Richard Dix, Dorothy Wilson, Bruce Cabot, and Erin O'Brien-Moore. Edith Fellows also has a role, playing the character of Alice Stebbins as a child.

A print is held by the Library of Congress.

== Plot ==
Phillip Eden cares for his daughter Alice. When he learns that his ex-wife Florence intends to take custody, he attempts to flee with Alice, but an acquaintance is accidentally killed. Phillip is sent to prison. He initially receives letters from Alice, who doesn't know where he is, but eventually Alice becomes depressed living with Florence. Eleven years go by, and Phillip, still in prison, decides he needs to see Alice, so he escapes from prison. He finds Florence has kept Alice a prisoner in her own house, having convinced her that she is ill. Stephen, who wants to marry Alice, arrives, and Phillip convinces Alice that she can be happy, that she doesn't have to accept everything her mother tells her. Stephen and Alice head to Europe while Phillip surrenders to the police.

== Cast ==
- Richard Dix as Phillip
- Dorothy Wilson as Alice
- Bruce Cabot as Stephen
- Erin O'Brien-Moore as Florence
- Leonard Carey as Alfred
- Shirley Grey as Bernice
- Edith Fellows as Alice, as a Child
- Eily Malyon as Jenny
