= Alimony Madness =

1933 film

- Directed by: B. Reeves Eason
- Written by: John T. Neville
- Produced by: Fanchon Royer
- Starring: Helen Chandler; Leon Ames; Edward Earle
- Cinematography: Ernest Miller
- Edited by: Jeanne Spencer
- Production company: Fanchon Royer Pictures
- Distributed by: Mayfair Pictures
- Release date: April 1, 1933
- Running time: 65 minutes
- Country: United States
- Language: English

Alimony Madness is a 1933 American pre-Code drama film directed by B. Reeves Eason and starring Helen Chandler, Leon Ames, and Edward Earle. The film's sets were designed by the art director Paul Palmentola.

== Plot ==
A man's greedy ex-wife who only married him for his money is receiving excessive sums in alimony from him. When his new wife, whom he met when she posed as the co-respondent for his divorce case, confronts him, the other woman ends up dead.

== Cast ==
- Helen Chandler as Joan Armstrong
- Leon Ames as John Thurman
- Edward Earle as Joel Mason
- Charlotte Merriam as Eloise Thurman
- Blanche Friderici as Mrs. Van
- Alberta Vaughn as Mary
- Arthur Loft as Dennis O'Shea
- Richard Cramer as Anderson - Process Server
- Gordon De Main as Doctor
- Mildred Gover as Eloise's Maid
- Kit Guard as Man in Alimony Jail
- John Ince as Judge Greer
- Dick Rush as Courtroom Police Guard
- Dorothy Vernon as Spectator Outside Courtroom

== Bibliography ==
- Michael R. Pitts. Poverty Row Studios, 1929–1940: An Illustrated History of 55 Independent Film Companies, with a Filmography for Each. McFarland & Company, 2005.
