= Sea of Lost Ships =

1953 film by Joseph Kane

- Directed by: Joseph Kane
- Screenplay by: Steve Fisher
- Story by: Norman Reilly Raine
- Produced by: Joseph Kane
- Starring: John Derek; Wanda Hendrix; Walter Brennan; Richard Jaeckel; Tom Tully; Barton MacLane; Erin O'Brien-Moore; Ben Cooper
- Cinematography: Reggie Lanning
- Edited by: Richard L. Van Enger
- Music by: R. Dale Butts
- Production company: Republic Pictures
- Distributed by: Republic Pictures
- Release dates: October 21, 1953 (Washington, D.C.); October 24, 1953 (United States)
- Running time: 85 minutes
- Country: United States
- Language: English

Sea of Lost Ships is a 1953 American adventure film directed by Joseph Kane and starring John Derek, Wanda Hendrix and Walter Brennan. It is a tribute to the US Coast Guard.

== Plot ==
G.R. "Grad" Matthews, the son of deceased Coast Guard hero Jack Matthews is raised by Coast Guard NCO O'Malley, who also has a son, H.G. "Hap" O'Malley, the same age. When Grad and Hap get older, both are accepted into the Coast Guard Academy, but Hap winds up being thrown out, bringing disgrace to his adopted family.

== Cast ==
- John Derek as G.R. "Grad" Matthews
- Wanda Hendrix as Pat Kirby
- Walter Brennan as C.P.O "Chief" O'Malley
- Richard Jaeckel as H.G. "Hap" O'Malley
- Tom Tully as Captain Holland
- Barton MacLane as Captain Jack Matthews
- Erin O'Brien-Moore as Nora O'Malley
- Ben Cooper as 3rd Plane Crewman
- Darryl Hickman as Pete Bennett
- Roy Roberts as Eagle Captain
- Tom Powers as Rear Admiral
- Richard Hale as Captain Welch
- James Brown as Ice Patrol Official
- Douglas Kennedy as Helicopter Pilot
- Steve Brodie as Lt. Rogers
- John Hudson as Pilot

== Production ==
Filming was to have started 15 December 1952. However it was pushed back until April 1953 as Steve Fisher rewrote the script. John Derek was borrowed from Columbia Pictures to play the lead. (After filming completed, Derek asked for – and was given – release from his Columbia contract.)

== Reception ==
FilmInk called it "dull".
