= Dangerous Corner (1934 film) =

1934 film directed by Phil Rosen

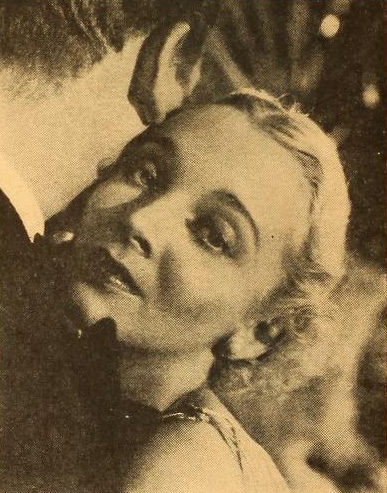
- Virginia Bruce in Dangerous Corner
- Directed by: Phil Rosen
- Written by: Anne Morrison Chapin; Madeleine Ruthven; Ralph Berton; Eugene Berton
- Based on: the novel and play Dangerous Corner by J. B. Priestley
- Produced by: B. P. Fineman
- Starring: Virginia Bruce; Conrad Nagel; Melvyn Douglas
- Cinematography: J. Roy Hunt
- Edited by: Archie Marshek
- Music by: Max Steiner
- Production company: RKO Radio Pictures
- Release date: October 5, 1934 (US)
- Running time: 67 minutes
- Country: United States
- Language: English

Dangerous Corner is a 1934 American mystery film directed by Phil Rosen, using a screenplay by Anne Morrison Chapin, Madeleine Ruthven, Ralph Berton, and Eugene Berton, which was based on a novel and play of the same name by J. B. Priestley. It starred Virginia Bruce, Conrad Nagel, and Melvyn Douglas.

== Plot ==
Robert Chatfield is having dinner with his wife, Freda, and four of their friends: Charles Stanton, his business partner; Ann Peel, who works at their company; and Robert's sister, Betty, and her husband, Gordon, who is another partner in the firm. As the dinner winds down, the subject of Robert's brother's suicide comes up. Robert's brother, Martin, had died from a gunshot wound, which an investigation had ruled a suicide, brought on by his guilt over stealing a bond from their company, of which he was also a partner. But now, during their dinner conversation, certain comments made by his companions don't add up in Robert's mind.

As he begins to question them, Freda confesses that she had been secretly in love with Martin, and Ann reveals that she has been carrying a torch for Robert for years. It was this unspoken love which caused Ann to not speak honestly at the hearing into Martin's death, for she thought that it might have been Robert, not Martin, who stole the bond. Betty announces that she has been in love with Charles, who confesses to having stolen the bond, in order to satisfy a debt owed by Betty, even though he has been in love with Ann.

Ann then confesses that Martin did not commit suicide as everyone thought, but that she accidentally shot him. Unable to deal with the guilt of all the confessions, Robert leaves the room and shoots himself. After a moment, time returns to the moment that the conversation started after dinner, but this time Gordon is able to repair the radio and plays music which stops the conversation from starting. Charles asks Ann for hand in marriage, as he has for years, but this time she accepts.

== Cast ==
- Virginia Bruce as Ann Peel
- Conrad Nagel as Robert Chatfield
- Melvyn Douglas as Charles Stanton
- Erin O'Brien-Moore as Freda Chatfield
- Ian Keith as Martin Chatfield
- Betty Furness as Betty Chatfield
- Henry Wadsworth as Gordon
- Doris Lloyd as Maude Mockridge

(Cast list as per AFI database.)

== Production ==
James B. Priestly wrote a play titled Dangerous Corner, which had been performed early in 1934. In August, it was reported that Virginia Bruce would make her first appearance in an RKO picture in Dangerous Corner, and at the same time it was revealed that Betty Furness and Erin O'Brien-Moore would be part of the cast. Bruce was being borrowed by RKO from MGM. Shortly after, Conrad Nagel was announced as an addition to the picture. Production on the film began on August 1. On August 22, it was announced that Phil Rosen would receive help in his directorial duties. While he would remain in charge of the action sequences, Arthur Sircom was brought in to handle directing the dialogue. Filming was completed by the beginning of September, and editing had begun. At the beginning of September, RKO announced that the film was scheduled for release on October 12, although by the end of the month the date had been moved up to October 5, and it was released on that date by RKO.

== Reception ==
The Film Daily thought it was an intelligent film, saying it was a "novel but rather complicated murder mystery with good performances and direction". They gave good notices to the acting, directing and cinematography. Motion Picture Daily thought the plot was too complicated for the average audience-goer. But they complimented Rosen's direction, and Hunt's cinematography, as well as highlighting the performances of Furness, Keith, and Lloyd. Photoplay called Dangerous Corner an "interesting experiment", and named the film one of the best pictures of the month.
