= Mildred Gover =

American film actress (1905–1947)

- Born: September 16, 1905; Omaha, Nebraska; United States
- Died: September 11, 1947 (aged 41); Los Angeles, California; United States
- Occupation: Actress
- Years active: 1931 - 1946 (film)

Mildred Gover (1905–1947) was an American actress.

Gover acted on stage for a decade before she began working in films in 1935. Her stage credits included All God's Chillun Got Wings and In Abraham's Bosom. Her film debut occurred in Harmony Lane.

== Selected filmography ==
- Alimony Madness (1933)
- Little Miss Marker (1934)
- Mrs. Wiggs of the Cabbage Patch (1934)
- High School Girl (1934)
- Ring Around the Moon (1936)
- Penrod and Sam (1937)
- My Old Kentucky Home (1938)
- The Affairs of Annabel (1938)
- Brother Rat (1938)
- Day-Time Wife (1939)
- Dark Command (1940)
- Ladies Must Live (1940)
- Rise and Shine (1941)

== Bibliography ==
- Pitts, Michael R. Western Movies: A Guide to 5,105 Feature Films. McFarland, 2012.
