= David Magie =

American classicist (1877–1960)

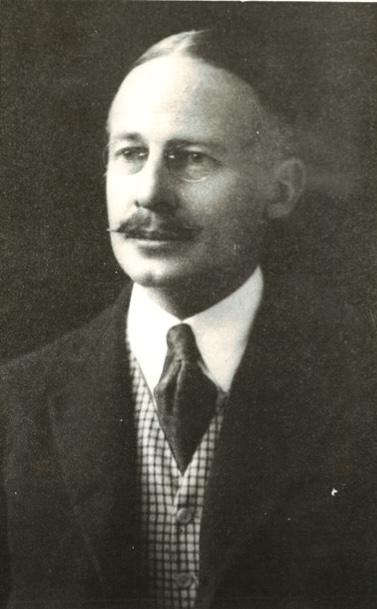
- Born: January 20, 1877; New York City, New York, U.S.
- Died: April 22, 1960 (aged 83); Princeton, New Jersey, U.S.
- Awards: Charles J. Goodwin Award of Merit (1951)

Academic background
- Education: Princeton University (A.B., A.M.); University of Halle (Ph.D.)
- Thesis: De Romanorum iuris publici sacrique vocabulis sol-lemnibus in Graecum sermonem conversis. Pars prior.
- Doctoral advisor: Georg Wissowa

Academic work
- Institutions: Princeton University

David Magie (January 20, 1877 – April 22, 1960) was an American classical scholar, historian, and philologist at Princeton University, best known for his scholarship on Roman provincial rule and translation of the Historia Augusta. His major work, Roman Rule in Asia Minor, won him the first-ever Charles J. Goodwin Award of Merit in 1951.

== Biography ==
Magie was born in New York City on January 20, 1877. His grandfather was James McCosh, the eleventh president of Princeton University. He began his classical studies at Lyon's Classical School in New York before entering Princeton University, where he majored in classics and received his A.B. in 1897, followed by an A.M. in 1899.

After a year teaching at the Lawrenceville School, he returned to Princeton as a graduate student and instructor in Latin in 1899. From 1901 to 1904 he studied at the University of Halle, earning his doctorate under Georg Wissowa. Returning to Princeton, he was appointed preceptor in 1905 and promoted to full professor of classics in 1911. He remained on the faculty until his retirement in 1945.

Magie took part in the second Princeton Archaeological Expedition to Syria in 1909, led by Howard Crosby Butler. During World War I, he served briefly with the United States Department of Justice and later as a staff member of the American Commission to Negotiate Peace in Paris. Personal wealth enabled Magie to retire early, at 53, after which he devoted himself entirely to his studies.

Magie died at his home in Princeton on April 22, 1960, at age 83, from heart and bronchial ailments. His will expressed his continuing devotion to Princeton through the endowment of the David Magie Class of 1897 Chair in Greek and Roman History in the Princeton University Department of Classics. His memory is also honored by the annual Magie Lectureship in the Princeton University Program in the Ancient World.

== Scholarship ==
Magie's scholarship focused on Roman provincial administration, Roman law, and late Roman historiography. His work is noted for its breadth and exhaustive source analysis.

His most influential publication was the two-volume, 1,660-page Roman Rule in Asia Minor to the End of the Third Century after Christ (1950), the culmination of nearly twenty-five years of research. Magie described the project as “planned in my youth, begun in middle life and finally completed in my old age.” The American Philological Association praised it as “the outstanding work out of the many outstanding works” on Roman expansion in Asia Minor, awarding him the inaugural Charles J. Goodwin Award of Merit at the age of 74.

Magie is also known for his three-volume edition, translation, and commentary on the Scriptores Historiae Augustae for the Loeb Classical Library, published between 1921 and 1932. The edition was known for its thorough erudition and deft handling of the controversy over the work's date and authorship. Magie collaborated on its composition with his student, Ainsworth O'Brien-Moore.

== Selected Publications ==
- Magie, David. De Romanorum iuris publici sacrique vocabulis sollemnibus in Graecum sermonem conversis. Ph.D. diss., University of Halle, 1904.
- Magie, David. Scriptores Historiae Augustae. 3 vols. Loeb Classical Library, 1922–1932.
- Magie, David. Roman Rule in Asia Minor to the End of the Third Century after Christ. 2 vols. Princeton University Press, 1950.
