= Erin O'Brien-Moore =

American actress (1902-1979)

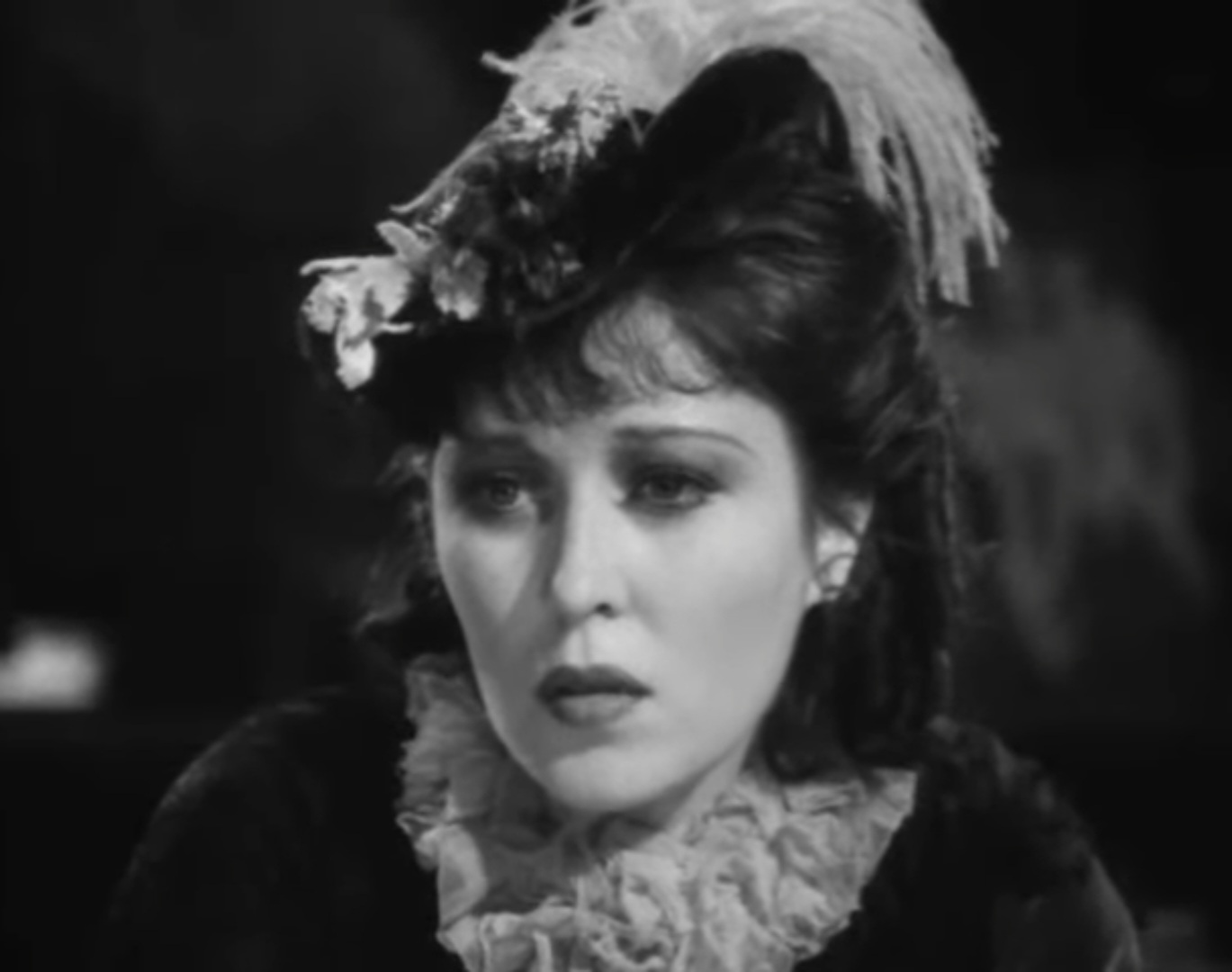
- O'Brien-Moore in The Life of Emile Zola (1937)
- Born: Annette O'Brien-Moore ca. May 2, 1902; Los Angeles, California, U.S.
- Died: May 3, 1979 (aged 77); Los Angeles, California, U.S.
- Occupation: Actress
- Years active: 1934-1970
- Spouse: Mark Barron (m. 1936; div. 1946)
- Family: Ainsworth O'Brien-Moore (brother)

Erin O'Brien-Moore (born Annette O'Brien-Moore, May 2, 1902 – May 3, 1979) was an American actress. She created the role of Rose in the original Broadway production of Elmer Rice's Pulitzer Prize-winning play Street Scene (1929), and was put under contract in Hollywood and made a number of films in the 1930s. Her promising career on the stage and screen was interrupted by severe injuries she sustained in a 1939 fire. Following her recovery and extensive plastic surgery, she returned to the stage and character roles in films and television, including four seasons of the primetime serial drama Peyton Place (1965–1968).

== Biography ==
=== Early life and beginning in the theater ===
O'Brien-Moore was born in Los Angeles, to J.B.L. and Agnes O'Brien-Moore. Her father was publisher of the Tucson Citizen; her older brother was classical scholar Ainsworth O'Brien-Moore. She was educated at a convent in Arizona, and planned to become a painter until she saw Alla Nazimova on the stage, when she turned her attention to the theatre. She first appeared on Broadway in 1926 as a maid in The Makropoulos Secret. In 1928, O'Brien-Moore played the female lead in E.E. Cummings' Him at the Provincetown Playhouse. She was the star of Elmer Rice's Street Scene (1929), a naturalistic drama about life in a New York City tenement that ran for 601 performances on Broadway, toured throughout the United States, and received the Pulitzer Prize. During the play's six-month run in London, Aldous Huxley became an ardent fan of O'Brien-Moore and saw her performance at least three times.

=== Career in Hollywood ===
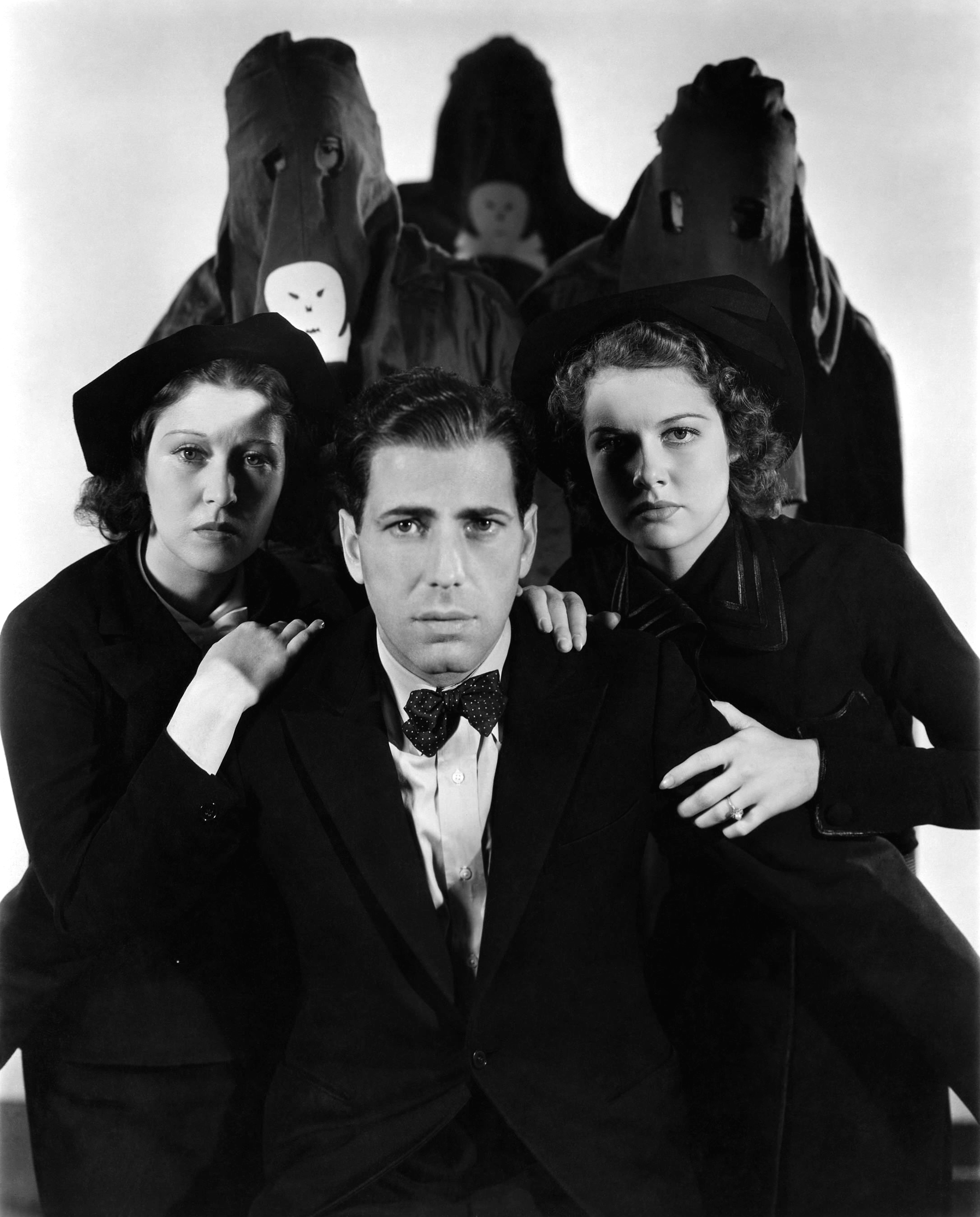
Erin O'Brien-Moore, Humphrey Bogart and Ann Sheridan in Black Legion (1937)

O'Brien-Moore's stage success led to a Hollywood contract and second-lead roles in films, including Black Legion (1937) with Humphrey Bogart. In The Life of Emile Zola (1937), with Paul Muni, she played the character who inspired the fictional character Nana. Her other films include Dangerous Corner (1934), Little Men (1934), His Greatest Gamble (1934), Seven Keys to Baldpate (1935), Streamline Express (1935), Our Little Girl (1935), Two in the Dark (1936), The Ex-Mrs. Bradford (1936), Ring Around the Moon (1936), The Leavenworth Case (1936), Green Light (1937) and The Plough and the Stars (1937).

Described by The New York Times as "a slender, dark-haired woman with fragile, beautiful features", O'Brien-Moore had a rising career that was interrupted by severe injuries she suffered January 22, 1939, in a fire. After she recovered from the accident, O'Brien-Moore resumed her acting career on radio, including Big Sister. She also starred in the serial John's Other Wife.

After extensive plastic surgery, O'Brien-Moore returned to the stage and resumed her career in films and television. In 1948, she performed on Kraft Television Theatre and in The Philco Television Playhouse presentation of Street Scene. She took the role of Anna, and Betty Field played Rose, the role that O'Brien-Moore had created on the stage.

She co-starred with Charlie Ruggles in the sitcom The Ruggles (1950–1952), and in many series that included NBC Presents, General Electric Theater, Lux Video Theater, Alfred Hitchcock Presents, and Perry Mason ("The Case of the Deadly Verdict"). She portrayed Miss Kelly in the 1961 pilot episode "The Return" of the series Window on Main Street (1961–62), appeared in a 1965 episode of Kentucky Jones and played the role of Nurse Esther Choate in the TV version of Peyton Place for four seasons (1965–1968).

Her later feature films include Destination Moon (1950), The Family Secret (1951), Sea of Lost Ships (1954), Phantom of the Rue Morgue (1954), Peyton Place (1957) and How to Succeed in Business Without Really Trying (1967).

=== Personal life and last years ===
O'Brien-Moore was married to Mark Barron, drama editor of the Associated Press in 1936. Their 10-year marriage ended in divorce.

O'Brien-Moore died of cancer on May 3, 1979, at the Motion Picture Country Hospital in Los Angeles.

== Filmography ==
Year	Title	Role	Notes
1934	His Greatest Gamble	Florence Stebbins	
1934	Dangerous Corner	Freda Chatfield	
1934	Little Men	Jo Bhaer	
1935	Our Little Girl	Sarah Boynton	
1935	Streamline Express	Mary Bradley	
1935	Seven Keys to Baldpate	Myra Thornhill	
1936	Two in the Dark	Olga Konar	
1936	The Leavenworth Case	Mrs. Silas (Gloria) Leavenworth	
1936	Ring Around the Moon	Gloria Endicott	
1936	The Ex-Mrs. Bradford	Mrs. Summers	
1936	The Plough and the Stars	Rosie	
1937	Black Legion	Ruth Taylor	
1937	Green Light	Pat Arlen	
1937	The Life of Emile Zola	Nana	
1950	Destination Moon	Emily Cargraves	
1951	The Family Secret	Ellen Clark	
1953	Sea of Lost Ships	Mrs. Nora O'Malley	
1954	Phantom of the Rue Morgue	Wardrobe Woman	
1955	The Long Gray Line	Mrs. Koehler	
1957	Peyton Place	Mrs. Evelyn Page	
1961	Alfred Hitchcock Presents	Mrs. Linda Harper	Season 6 Episode 31: "The Gloating Place"
1962	Mooncussers	Mrs. Feather	
1967	How to Succeed in Business Without Really Trying	Gertrude Biggley	uncredited
